= 2017 ITF Women's Circuit (July–September) =

Tennis tournament series

The 2017 ITF Women's Circuit is the 2017 edition of the second tier tour for women's professional tennis. It is organised by the International Tennis Federation and is a tier below the WTA Tour. The ITF Women's Circuit includes tournaments with prize money ranging from $15,000 up to $100,000.

== Key ==
Category
$100,000 tournaments
$80,000 tournaments
$60,000 tournaments
$25,000 tournaments
$15,000 tournaments

== Month ==
=== July ===
Week of	Tournament	Winner	Runners-up	Semifinalists	Quarterfinalists
July 3	Torneo Internazionale Femminile Antico Tiro a Volo; Rome, Italy; Clay $60,000; Singles – Doubles	(Ukraine) Kateryna Kozlova; 7–6^{(8–6)}, 6–4	(Colombia) Mariana Duque Mariño	(Italy) Jessica Pieri (Bulgaria) Viktoriya Tomova	(Spain) Sílvia Soler Espinosa (Russia) Viktoria Kamenskaya (Italy) Martina Trevisan (Italy) Georgia Brescia
July 3	Torneo Internazionale Femminile Antico Tiro a Volo; Rome, Italy; Clay $60,000; Singles – Doubles	(Russia) Anastasiya Komardina (Argentina) Nadia Podoroska; 7–6^{(7–3)}, 6–3	(Netherlands) Quirine Lemoine (Netherlands) Eva Wacanno	(Italy) Jessica Pieri (Bulgaria) Viktoriya Tomova	(Spain) Sílvia Soler Espinosa (Russia) Viktoria Kamenskaya (Italy) Martina Trevisan (Italy) Georgia Brescia
July 3	Open Porte du Hainaut; Denain, France; Clay $25,000; Singles and doubles draws	(North Macedonia) Lina Gjorcheska; 6–2, 5–7, 7–6^{(8–6)}	(Japan) Mari Osaka	(France) Manon Arcangioli (Russia) Valentyna Ivakhnenko	(Japan) Chihiro Muramatsu (France) Audrey Albié (France) Harmony Tan (Australia) Belinda Woolcock
July 3	Open Porte du Hainaut; Denain, France; Clay $25,000; Singles and doubles draws	(Japan) Momoko Kobori (Japan) Ayano Shimizu; 6–4, 6–3	(France) Mathilde Armitano (France) Elixane Lechemia	(France) Manon Arcangioli (Russia) Valentyna Ivakhnenko	(Japan) Chihiro Muramatsu (France) Audrey Albié (France) Harmony Tan (Australia) Belinda Woolcock
July 3	Darmstadt, Germany; Clay $25,000; Singles and doubles draws	(Ukraine) Anhelina Kalinina; 6–2, 0–6, 6–3	(United States) Bernarda Pera	(Switzerland) Amra Sadiković (Czech Republic) Anastasia Zarycká	(Germany) Antonia Lottner (Poland) Magdalena Fręch (Austria) Barbara Haas (Egypt) Sandra Samir
July 3	Darmstadt, Germany; Clay $25,000; Singles and doubles draws	(Romania) Laura-Ioana Andrei (Czech Republic) Anastasia Zarycká; 4–6, 7–6^{(7–5)}, [10–3]	(Egypt) Sandra Samir (Liechtenstein) Kathinka von Deichmann	(Switzerland) Amra Sadiković (Czech Republic) Anastasia Zarycká	(Germany) Antonia Lottner (Poland) Magdalena Fręch (Austria) Barbara Haas (Egypt) Sandra Samir
July 3	Middelburg, Netherlands; Clay $25,000; Singles and doubles draws	(Netherlands) Arantxa Rus; 3–6, 6–2, 6–3	(Greece) Valentini Grammatikopoulou	(Czech Republic) Karolína Muchová (Serbia) Dejana Radanović	(Netherlands) Nina Kruijer (Australia) Gabriella Da Silva-Fick (Netherlands) Merel Hoedt (Australia) Zoe Hives
July 3	Middelburg, Netherlands; Clay $25,000; Singles and doubles draws	(Greece) Valentini Grammatikopoulou (Netherlands) Bibiane Schoofs; 6–7^{(8–10)}, 7–5, [10–5]	(Australia) Naiktha Bains (United States) Dasha Ivanova	(Czech Republic) Karolína Muchová (Serbia) Dejana Radanović	(Netherlands) Nina Kruijer (Australia) Gabriella Da Silva-Fick (Netherlands) Merel Hoedt (Australia) Zoe Hives
July 3	Getxo, Spain; Clay $25,000; Singles and doubles draws	(Romania) Mihaela Buzărnescu; 6–2, 6–2	(Mexico) Renata Zarazúa	(France) Tessah Andrianjafitrimo (Spain) Olga Sáez Larra	(Israel) Julia Glushko (Hungary) Vanda Lukács (Bulgaria) Aleksandrina Naydenova (Spain) Paula Badosa Gibert
July 3	Getxo, Spain; Clay $25,000; Singles and doubles draws	(Venezuela) Andrea Gámiz (Bulgaria) Aleksandrina Naydenova; 6–2, 6–4	(Spain) Cristina Bucșa (Bolivia) Noelia Zeballos	(France) Tessah Andrianjafitrimo (Spain) Olga Sáez Larra	(Israel) Julia Glushko (Hungary) Vanda Lukács (Bulgaria) Aleksandrina Naydenova (Spain) Paula Badosa Gibert
July 3	Anning, China; Clay $15,000; Singles and doubles draws	(Hong Kong) Eudice Chong; 6–4, 4–6, 6–3	(Hong Kong) Zhang Ling	(China) Tang Qianhui (China) Ni Ma Zhuoma	(China) You Xiaodi (China) Wei Zhanlan (China) He Jiaying (Japan) Chihiro Takayama
July 3	Anning, China; Clay $15,000; Singles and doubles draws	(China) Feng Shuo (China) Li Yihong; 6–3, 6–4	(China) Jiang Xinyu (China) Tang Qianhui	(China) Tang Qianhui (China) Ni Ma Zhuoma	(China) You Xiaodi (China) Wei Zhanlan (China) He Jiaying (Japan) Chihiro Takayama
July 3	Sharm El Sheikh, Egypt; Hard $15,000; Singles and doubles draws	(Russia) Vera Zvonareva; 1–6, 7–6^{(7–4)}, 7–5	(Slovakia) Tereza Mihalíková	(Sweden) Brenda Njuki (Australia) Alexandra Walters	(Sweden) Jacqueline Cabaj Awad (Republic of Ireland) Jennifer Timotin (Italy) Francesca Sella (Russia) Angelina Zhuravleva
July 3	Sharm El Sheikh, Egypt; Hard $15,000; Singles and doubles draws	(India) Kanika Vaidya (Russia) Angelina Zhuravleva; 7–5, 6–4	(Italy) Verena Hofer (Italy) Francesca Sella	(Sweden) Brenda Njuki (Australia) Alexandra Walters	(Sweden) Jacqueline Cabaj Awad (Republic of Ireland) Jennifer Timotin (Italy) Francesca Sella (Russia) Angelina Zhuravleva
July 3	Amarante, Portugal; Hard $15,000; Singles and doubles draws	(China) Lu Jiajing; 6–4, 6–4	(Montenegro) Ana Veselinović	(Spain) María José Luque Moreno (Spain) Nuria Párrizas Díaz	(United States) Jessica Ho (Switzerland) Lara Michel (Ukraine) Marianna Zakarlyuk (Italy) Giorgia Pinto
July 3	Amarante, Portugal; Hard $15,000; Singles and doubles draws	(Spain) Alba Carrillo Marín (Portugal) Inês Murta; 7–6^{(7–5)}, 3–6, [13–11]	(Italy) Maria Masini (Spain) Olga Parres Azcoitia	(Spain) María José Luque Moreno (Spain) Nuria Párrizas Díaz	(United States) Jessica Ho (Switzerland) Lara Michel (Ukraine) Marianna Zakarlyuk (Italy) Giorgia Pinto
July 3	Focșani, Romania; Clay $15,000+H; Singles and doubles draws	(Romania) Nicoleta Dascălu; 6–2, 6–2	(Moldova) Alexandra Perper	(United States) Maria Mateas (Italy) Martina Colmegna	(Romania) Cristina Dinu (Romania) Andreea Amalia Roșca (Romania) Cristina Ene (Romania) Georgia Andreea Crăciun
July 3	Focșani, Romania; Clay $15,000+H; Singles and doubles draws	(Romania) Oana Gavrilă (Russia) Ekaterina Kazionova; 6–2, 6–1	(Italy) Martina Colmegna (Romania) Camelia Hristea	(United States) Maria Mateas (Italy) Martina Colmegna	(Romania) Cristina Dinu (Romania) Andreea Amalia Roșca (Romania) Cristina Ene (Romania) Georgia Andreea Crăciun
July 3	Prokuplje, Serbia; Clay $15,000; Singles and doubles draws	(Greece) Despina Papamichail; 3–6, 7–6^{(7–5)}, 6–3	(Ukraine) Maryna Chernyshova	(Russia) Daria Lodikova (Serbia) Tijana Spasojević	(Bosnia and Herzegovina) Dea Herdželaš (Moldova) Anastasia Dețiuc (Greece) Eleni Christofi (Czech Republic) Karolína Novotná
July 3	Prokuplje, Serbia; Clay $15,000; Singles and doubles draws	(United States) Natalie Suk (Czech Republic) Kateřina Vaňková; 6–0, 6–1	(Russia) Daria Lodikova (Bulgaria) Ani Vangelova	(Russia) Daria Lodikova (Serbia) Tijana Spasojević	(Bosnia and Herzegovina) Dea Herdželaš (Moldova) Anastasia Dețiuc (Greece) Eleni Christofi (Czech Republic) Karolína Novotná
July 3	Istanbul, Turkey; Clay $15,000; Singles and doubles draws	(Georgia (country)) Ekaterine Gorgodze; 6–2, 6–1	(United States) Sanaz Marand	(France) Caroline Roméo (Georgia (country)) Mariam Bolkvadze	(France) Joséphine Boualem (Romania) Cristina Adamescu (Turkey) Melis Sezer (France) Louise Lampla
July 3	Istanbul, Turkey; Clay $15,000; Singles and doubles draws	(Georgia (country)) Mariam Bolkvadze (Georgia (country)) Ekaterine Gorgodze; 6–1, 6–3	(Bulgaria) Petia Arshinkova (Turkey) İpek Öz	(France) Caroline Roméo (Georgia (country)) Mariam Bolkvadze	(France) Joséphine Boualem (Romania) Cristina Adamescu (Turkey) Melis Sezer (France) Louise Lampla
July 10	Grand Est Open 88; Contrexéville, France; Clay $100,000; Singles – Doubles	(Sweden) Johanna Larsson; 6–1, 6–4	(Germany) Tatjana Maria	(Russia) Evgeniya Rodina (France) Pauline Parmentier	(Romania) Irina Bara (Romania) Alexandra Dulgheru (Spain) Sara Sorribes Tormo (Germany) Tamara Korpatsch
July 10	Grand Est Open 88; Contrexéville, France; Clay $100,000; Singles – Doubles	(Russia) Anastasiya Komardina (Bulgaria) Elitsa Kostova; 6–3, 6–4	(France) Manon Arcangioli (France) Sara Cakarevic	(Russia) Evgeniya Rodina (France) Pauline Parmentier	(Romania) Irina Bara (Romania) Alexandra Dulgheru (Spain) Sara Sorribes Tormo (Germany) Tamara Korpatsch
July 10	Sport11 Ladies Open; Budapest, Hungary; Clay $100,000; Singles – Doubles	(Slovakia) Jana Čepelová; 6–4, 6–3	(Montenegro) Danka Kovinić	(Bulgaria) Viktoriya Tomova (Ukraine) Kateryna Kozlova	(Colombia) Mariana Duque Mariño (Slovakia) Chantal Škamlová (Russia) Irina Khromacheva (Turkey) Çağla Büyükakçay
July 10	Sport11 Ladies Open; Budapest, Hungary; Clay $100,000; Singles – Doubles	(Colombia) Mariana Duque Mariño (Argentina) María Irigoyen; 7–6^{(7–3)}, 7–5	(Serbia) Aleksandra Krunić (Serbia) Nina Stojanović	(Bulgaria) Viktoriya Tomova (Ukraine) Kateryna Kozlova	(Colombia) Mariana Duque Mariño (Slovakia) Chantal Škamlová (Russia) Irina Khromacheva (Turkey) Çağla Büyükakçay
July 10	Reinert Open; Versmold, Germany; Clay $60,000; Singles – Doubles	(Romania) Mihaela Buzărnescu; 6–0, 6–2	(Austria) Barbara Haas	(Netherlands) Bibiane Schoofs (Czech Republic) Anastasia Zarycká	(Belgium) Kimberley Zimmermann (Germany) Laura Schaeder (Sweden) Rebecca Peterson (Uzbekistan) Sabina Sharipova
July 10	Reinert Open; Versmold, Germany; Clay $60,000; Singles – Doubles	(Germany) Katharina Gerlach (Germany) Julia Wachaczyk; 4–6, 6–1, [10–7]	(Japan) Misa Eguchi (Japan) Akiko Omae	(Netherlands) Bibiane Schoofs (Czech Republic) Anastasia Zarycká	(Belgium) Kimberley Zimmermann (Germany) Laura Schaeder (Sweden) Rebecca Peterson (Uzbekistan) Sabina Sharipova
July 10	Winnipeg Challenger; Winnipeg, Canada; Hard $25,000; Singles and doubles draws	(United States) Caroline Dolehide; 6–3, 6–4	(Japan) Mayo Hibi	(United States) Nicole Gibbs (China) Xu Shilin	(France) Jessika Ponchet (United States) Alexandra Mueller (Japan) Miharu Imanishi (Japan) Hiroko Kuwata
July 10	Winnipeg Challenger; Winnipeg, Canada; Hard $25,000; Singles and doubles draws	(Japan) Hiroko Kuwata (Russia) Valeria Savinykh; 6–4, 7–6^{(7–4)}	(Australia) Kimberly Birrell (United States) Caroline Dolehide	(United States) Nicole Gibbs (China) Xu Shilin	(France) Jessika Ponchet (United States) Alexandra Mueller (Japan) Miharu Imanishi (Japan) Hiroko Kuwata
July 10	Naiman, China; Hard $25,000; Singles and doubles draws	(China) Lu Jingjing; 6–2, 6–1	(India) Karman Kaur Thandi	(Japan) Miyabi Inoue (China) Gao Xinyu	(China) Xun Fangying (Japan) Erika Sema (China) Zheng Wushuang (China) Liu Fangzhou
July 10	Naiman, China; Hard $25,000; Singles and doubles draws	(China) Gao Xinyu (China) Xun Fangying; 6–7^{(5–7)}, 6–4, [10–8]	(China) Lu Jingjing (China) You Xiaodi	(Japan) Miyabi Inoue (China) Gao Xinyu	(China) Xun Fangying (Japan) Erika Sema (China) Zheng Wushuang (China) Liu Fangzhou
July 10	Turin, Italy; Clay $25,000; Singles and doubles draws	(Italy) Deborah Chiesa; 6–3, 2–6, 7–5	(Mexico) Renata Zarazúa	(France) Alizé Lim (Australia) Zoe Hives	(Italy) Giorgia Marchetti (Belgium) Elyne Boeykens (Italy) Camilla Scala (Italy) Anna Remondina
July 10	Turin, Italy; Clay $25,000; Singles and doubles draws	(Spain) Estrella Cabeza Candela (Brazil) Paula Cristina Gonçalves; 5–7, 6–0, [10–8]	(Spain) Irene Burillo Escorihuela (Spain) Yvonne Cavallé Reimers	(France) Alizé Lim (Australia) Zoe Hives	(Italy) Giorgia Marchetti (Belgium) Elyne Boeykens (Italy) Camilla Scala (Italy) Anna Remondina
July 10	Moscow, Russia; Clay $25,000; Singles and doubles draws	(Ukraine) Olga Ianchuk; 4–6, 6–0, 7–6^{(7–5)}	(Russia) Valentyna Ivakhnenko	(Russia) Olga Puchkova (Italy) Giulia Gatto-Monticone	(Russia) Alexandra Panova (Russia) Anastasia Frolova (Russia) Anastasia Pivovarova (Ukraine) Valeriya Strakhova
July 10	Moscow, Russia; Clay $25,000; Singles and doubles draws	(Uzbekistan) Akgul Amanmuradova (Russia) Valentyna Ivakhnenko; 6–4, 6–2	(Belarus) Ilona Kremen (Belarus) Iryna Shymanovich	(Russia) Olga Puchkova (Italy) Giulia Gatto-Monticone	(Russia) Alexandra Panova (Russia) Anastasia Frolova (Russia) Anastasia Pivovarova (Ukraine) Valeriya Strakhova
July 10	Knokke, Belgium; Clay $15,000; Singles and doubles draws	(Sweden) Mirjam Björklund; 6–3, 6–4	(France) Marie Témin	(Australia) Nina Alibalić (Belgium) Axana Mareen	(Belgium) Catherine Chantraine (France) Alice Ramé (Belgium) Luna Meers (Brazil) Luisa Stefani
July 10	Knokke, Belgium; Clay $15,000; Singles and doubles draws	(United States) Quinn Gleason (Brazil) Luisa Stefani; 6–4, 7–5	(Switzerland) Leonie Küng (Belgium) Axana Mareen	(Australia) Nina Alibalić (Belgium) Axana Mareen	(Belgium) Catherine Chantraine (France) Alice Ramé (Belgium) Luna Meers (Brazil) Luisa Stefani
July 10	Torneio Internacional de Tênis Campos do Jordão; Campos do Jordão, Brazil; Hard $15,000; Singles and doubles draws	(Brazil) Gabriela Cé; 6–4, 7–6^{(7–3)}	(Argentina) Guillermina Naya	(Mexico) Andrea Renée Villarreal (United States) Akilah James	(Ecuador) Camila Romero (Paraguay) Lara Escauriza (Chile) Bárbara Gatica (Brazil) Nathaly Kurata
July 10	Torneio Internacional de Tênis Campos do Jordão; Campos do Jordão, Brazil; Hard $15,000; Singles and doubles draws	(Brazil) Ingrid Gamarra Martins (Paraguay) Camila Giangreco Campiz; 6–3, 7–6^{(7–1)}	(Brazil) Nathaly Kurata (Brazil) Rebeca Pereira	(Mexico) Andrea Renée Villarreal (United States) Akilah James	(Ecuador) Camila Romero (Paraguay) Lara Escauriza (Chile) Bárbara Gatica (Brazil) Nathaly Kurata
July 10	Sharm El Sheikh, Egypt; Hard $15,000; Singles and doubles draws	(Sweden) Jacqueline Cabaj Awad; 4–6, 6–3, 6–1	(Japan) Ramu Ueda	(Switzerland) Arlinda Rushiti (Egypt) Mayar Sherif	(France) Clémence Fayol (Romania) Ana Bianca Mihăilă (Republic of Ireland) Jennifer Timotin (Egypt) Lamis Alhussein Abdel Aziz
July 10	Sharm El Sheikh, Egypt; Hard $15,000; Singles and doubles draws	(India) Rutuja Bhosale (India) Kanika Vaidya; 6–2, 6–4	(Germany) Linda Prenkovic (Australia) Jelena Stojanovic	(Switzerland) Arlinda Rushiti (Egypt) Mayar Sherif	(France) Clémence Fayol (Romania) Ana Bianca Mihăilă (Republic of Ireland) Jennifer Timotin (Egypt) Lamis Alhussein Abdel Aziz
July 10	Telavi Open; Telavi, Georgia; Clay $15,000; Singles and doubles draws	(Georgia (country)) Ekaterine Gorgodze; 6–2, 6–0	(Belgium) Margaux Bovy	(Georgia (country)) Tatia Mikadze (Russia) Vasilisa Aponasenko	(Ukraine) Oleksandra Piskun (Italy) Martina Colmegna (Czech Republic) Anna Sisková (Georgia (country)) Mariam Bolkvadze
July 10	Telavi Open; Telavi, Georgia; Clay $15,000; Singles and doubles draws	(Belarus) Polina Pekhova (Russia) Maria Solnyshkina; 6–2, 1–6, [10–7]	(Georgia (country)) Mariam Bolkvadze (Georgia (country)) Ekaterine Gorgodze	(Georgia (country)) Tatia Mikadze (Russia) Vasilisa Aponasenko	(Ukraine) Oleksandra Piskun (Italy) Martina Colmegna (Czech Republic) Anna Sisková (Georgia (country)) Mariam Bolkvadze
July 10	Amstelveen, Netherlands; Clay $15,000; Singles and doubles draws	(Germany) Lisa Matviyenko; 7–6^{(7–5)}, 6–2	(Mexico) Ana Sofía Sánchez	(Austria) Melanie Klaffner (Czech Republic) Diana Šumová	(Netherlands) Merel Hoedt (Germany) Laura Heinrichs (Netherlands) Suzan Lamens (Australia) Samantha Harris
July 10	Amstelveen, Netherlands; Clay $15,000; Singles and doubles draws	(United States) Dasha Ivanova (Netherlands) Rosalie van der Hoek; 6–4, 6–4	(United Kingdom) Emily Arbuthnott (Australia) Belinda Woolcock	(Austria) Melanie Klaffner (Czech Republic) Diana Šumová	(Netherlands) Merel Hoedt (Germany) Laura Heinrichs (Netherlands) Suzan Lamens (Australia) Samantha Harris
July 10	Cantanhede, Portugal; Carpet $15,000; Singles and doubles draws	(Republic of Ireland) Sinéad Lohan; 6–2, 4–6, 6–1	(United Kingdom) Alicia Barnett	(Spain) Nuria Párrizas Díaz (Spain) Marina Bassols Ribera	(Portugal) Maria João Koehler (Malta) Helene Pellicano (United States) Jessica Ho (Portugal) Cláudia Gaspar
July 10	Cantanhede, Portugal; Carpet $15,000; Singles and doubles draws	(Italy) Maria Masini (Spain) Olga Parres Azcoitia; 3–6, 6–3, [10–4]	(France) Mathilde Armitano (Portugal) Inês Murta	(Spain) Nuria Párrizas Díaz (Spain) Marina Bassols Ribera	(Portugal) Maria João Koehler (Malta) Helene Pellicano (United States) Jessica Ho (Portugal) Cláudia Gaspar
July 10	Prokuplje, Serbia; Clay $15,000; Singles and doubles draws	(Romania) Oana Gavrilă; 6–4, 6–3	(Serbia) Tamara Čurović	(Serbia) Kristina Ostojić (Russia) Daria Lodikova	(Japan) Satsuki Takamura (Serbia) Katarina Adamović (Ukraine) Maryna Chernyshova (United States) Maria Mateas
July 10	Prokuplje, Serbia; Clay $15,000; Singles and doubles draws	(Ukraine) Maryna Chernyshova (Russia) Daria Lodikova; 3–6, 6–4, [10–4]	(United States) Natalie Suk (Czech Republic) Kateřina Vaňková	(Serbia) Kristina Ostojić (Russia) Daria Lodikova	(Japan) Satsuki Takamura (Serbia) Katarina Adamović (Ukraine) Maryna Chernyshova (United States) Maria Mateas
July 10	Hua Hin, Thailand; Hard $15,000; Singles and doubles draws	(Australia) Michaela Haet; 6–2, 6–7^{(5–7)}, 7–5	(Chinese Taipei) Hsu Chieh-yu	(United States) Naomi Cheong (South Korea) Kim Se-hyun	(Thailand) Varunya Wongteanchai (Australia) Alexandra Bozovic (Thailand) Apichaya Runglerdkriangkrai (Thailand) Nudnida Luangnam
July 10	Hua Hin, Thailand; Hard $15,000; Singles and doubles draws	(Indonesia) Beatrice Gumulya (Indonesia) Jessy Rompies; 6–2, 6–1	(Thailand) Nudnida Luangnam (Thailand) Varunya Wongteanchai	(United States) Naomi Cheong (South Korea) Kim Se-hyun	(Thailand) Varunya Wongteanchai (Australia) Alexandra Bozovic (Thailand) Apichaya Runglerdkriangkrai (Thailand) Nudnida Luangnam
July 17	President's Cup; Astana, Kazakhstan; Hard $100,000+H; Singles – Doubles	(China) Zhang Shuai; 6–3, 6–4	(Belgium) Ysaline Bonaventure	(Germany) Vivian Heisen (Russia) Natela Dzalamidze	(Czech Republic) Marie Bouzková (Serbia) Natalija Kostić (Russia) Veronika Kudermetova (United Kingdom) Naomi Broady
July 17	President's Cup; Astana, Kazakhstan; Hard $100,000+H; Singles – Doubles	(Russia) Natela Dzalamidze (Russia) Veronika Kudermetova; 6–2, 6–0	(Belgium) Ysaline Bonaventure (United Kingdom) Naomi Broady	(Germany) Vivian Heisen (Russia) Natela Dzalamidze	(Czech Republic) Marie Bouzková (Serbia) Natalija Kostić (Russia) Veronika Kudermetova (United Kingdom) Naomi Broady
July 17	ITS Cup; Olomouc, Czech Republic; Clay $80,000+H; Singles – Doubles	(United States) Bernarda Pera; 7–5, 4–6, 6–3	(Czech Republic) Kristýna Plíšková	(Czech Republic) Denisa Allertová (Slovakia) Michaela Hončová	(Sweden) Rebecca Peterson (Czech Republic) Lucie Hradecká (Czech Republic) Jesika Malečková (Netherlands) Richèl Hogenkamp
July 17	ITS Cup; Olomouc, Czech Republic; Clay $80,000+H; Singles – Doubles	(France) Amandine Hesse (Mexico) Victoria Rodríguez; 3–6, 6–2, [10–6]	(Slovakia) Michaela Hončová (Romania) Raluca Georgiana Șerban	(Czech Republic) Denisa Allertová (Slovakia) Michaela Hončová	(Sweden) Rebecca Peterson (Czech Republic) Lucie Hradecká (Czech Republic) Jesika Malečková (Netherlands) Richèl Hogenkamp
July 17	Bursa Cup; Bursa, Turkey; Clay $60,000; Singles – Doubles	(Russia) Sofya Zhuk; 4–6, 6–3, 7–6^{(7–5)}	(Turkey) İpek Soylu	(India) Ankita Raina (Russia) Valentyna Ivakhnenko	(Turkey) Ayla Aksu (Serbia) Dejana Radanović (Ukraine) Ganna Poznikhirenko (Ukraine) Dayana Yastremska
July 17	Bursa Cup; Bursa, Turkey; Clay $60,000; Singles – Doubles	(Russia) Valentyna Ivakhnenko (Ukraine) Anastasiya Vasylyeva; 6–3, 5–7, [10–1]	(Bosnia and Herzegovina) Dea Herdželaš (Russia) Aleksandra Pospelova	(India) Ankita Raina (Russia) Valentyna Ivakhnenko	(Turkey) Ayla Aksu (Serbia) Dejana Radanović (Ukraine) Ganna Poznikhirenko (Ukraine) Dayana Yastremska
July 17	Stockton Challenger; Stockton, United States; Hard $60,000; Singles – Doubles	(United States) Sofia Kenin; 6–0, 6–1	(United States) Ashley Kratzer	(Croatia) Ajla Tomljanović (United States) Jamie Loeb	(United States) Irina Falconi (United States) Francesca Di Lorenzo (China) Xu Shilin (United States) Amanda Anisimova
July 17	Stockton Challenger; Stockton, United States; Hard $60,000; Singles – Doubles	(United States) Usue Maitane Arconada (United States) Sofia Kenin; 4–6, 6–1, [10–5]	(Australia) Tammi Patterson (South Africa) Chanel Simmonds	(Croatia) Ajla Tomljanović (United States) Jamie Loeb	(United States) Irina Falconi (United States) Francesca Di Lorenzo (China) Xu Shilin (United States) Amanda Anisimova
July 17	Challenger de Gatineau; Gatineau, Canada; Hard $25,000; Singles and doubles draws	(Canada) Aleksandra Wozniak; 7–6^{(7–4)}, 6–4	(Australia) Ellen Perez	(Germany) Sarah-Rebecca Sekulic (Australia) Priscilla Hon	(United Kingdom) Samantha Murray (Chile) Alexa Guarachi (Japan) Mayo Hibi (Mexico) Marcela Zacarías
July 17	Challenger de Gatineau; Gatineau, Canada; Hard $25,000; Singles and doubles draws	(Japan) Hiroko Kuwata (Russia) Valeria Savinykh; 4–6, 6–3, [10–5]	(Australia) Kimberly Birrell (United Kingdom) Emily Webley-Smith	(Germany) Sarah-Rebecca Sekulic (Australia) Priscilla Hon	(United Kingdom) Samantha Murray (Chile) Alexa Guarachi (Japan) Mayo Hibi (Mexico) Marcela Zacarías
July 17	Tianjin Health Industry Park; Tianjin, China; Hard $25,000; Singles and doubles draws	(China) Wang Yafan; 6–4, 6–2	(China) Zhu Lin	(China) Lu Jiajing (China) Liu Fangzhou	(China) Gao Xinyu (China) Lu Jingjing (Thailand) Peangtarn Plipuech (South Korea) Han Na-lae
July 17	Tianjin Health Industry Park; Tianjin, China; Hard $25,000; Singles and doubles draws	(China) Jiang Xinyu (China) Tang Qianhui; 6–4, 6–1	(China) Liu Chang (China) Lu Jiajing	(China) Lu Jiajing (China) Liu Fangzhou	(China) Gao Xinyu (China) Lu Jingjing (Thailand) Peangtarn Plipuech (South Korea) Han Na-lae
July 17	Aschaffenburg, Germany; Clay $25,000; Singles and doubles draws	(Germany) Katharina Hobgarski; 7–5, 6–4	(Spain) Yvonne Cavallé Reimers	(Japan) Misa Eguchi (Belgium) Kimberley Zimmermann	(Spain) Irene Burillo Escorihuela (Germany) Lisa Matviyenko (Australia) Nina Alibalić (Germany) Lena Rüffer
July 17	Aschaffenburg, Germany; Clay $25,000; Singles and doubles draws	(Germany) Katharina Hobgarski (Germany) Julia Wachaczyk; 6–3, 2–6, [10–3]	(United States) Yuki Kristina Chiang (Germany) Lisa Ponomar	(Japan) Misa Eguchi (Belgium) Kimberley Zimmermann	(Spain) Irene Burillo Escorihuela (Germany) Lisa Matviyenko (Australia) Nina Alibalić (Germany) Lena Rüffer
July 17	Imola, Italy; Carpet $25,000; Singles and doubles draws	(Slovakia) Viktória Kužmová; 6–3, 6–3	(Italy) Stefania Rubini	(Spain) Estrella Cabeza Candela (Hungary) Gréta Arn	(France) Elixane Lechemia (Slovenia) Manca Pislak (Italy) Ludmilla Samsonova (France) Shérazad Reix
July 17	Imola, Italy; Carpet $25,000; Singles and doubles draws	(Spain) Estrella Cabeza Candela (Brazil) Paula Cristina Gonçalves; 6–3, 1–6, [10–3]	(Greece) Eleni Kordolaimi (Australia) Seone Mendez	(Spain) Estrella Cabeza Candela (Hungary) Gréta Arn	(France) Elixane Lechemia (Slovenia) Manca Pislak (Italy) Ludmilla Samsonova (France) Shérazad Reix
July 17	Brussels, Belgium; Clay $15,000; Singles and doubles draws	(Mexico) Ana Sofía Sánchez; 3–6, 6–4, 6–1	(Sweden) Mirjam Björklund	(Brazil) Luisa Stefani (Luxembourg) Eléonora Molinaro	(Belgium) Axana Mareen (Algeria) Inès Ibbou (United States) Quinn Gleason (Belgium) Déborah Kerfs
July 17	Brussels, Belgium; Clay $15,000; Singles and doubles draws	(United States) Quinn Gleason (Brazil) Luisa Stefani; 6–3, 6–2	(France) Priscilla Heise (Belgium) Déborah Kerfs	(Brazil) Luisa Stefani (Luxembourg) Eléonora Molinaro	(Belgium) Axana Mareen (Algeria) Inès Ibbou (United States) Quinn Gleason (Belgium) Déborah Kerfs
July 17	Sharm El Sheikh, Egypt; Hard $15,000; Singles and doubles draws	(Sweden) Jacqueline Cabaj Awad; 6–7^{(4–7)}, 7–5, 6–4	(Egypt) Mayar Sherif	(India) Rutuja Bhosale (Switzerland) Arlinda Rushiti	(United States) Eva Siska (China) Zhao Xiaoxi (Italy) Federica Prati (France) Clémence Fayol
July 17	Sharm El Sheikh, Egypt; Hard $15,000; Singles and doubles draws	(India) Rutuja Bhosale (Egypt) Mayar Sherif; 3–6, 6–3, [10–5]	(Chinese Taipei) Chen Pei-hsuan (Chinese Taipei) Wu Fang-hsien	(India) Rutuja Bhosale (Switzerland) Arlinda Rushiti	(United States) Eva Siska (China) Zhao Xiaoxi (Italy) Federica Prati (France) Clémence Fayol
July 17	Târgu Jiu, Romania; Clay $15,000; Singles and doubles draws	(Italy) Gaia Sanesi; 6–1, 6–2	(Romania) Miriam Bianca Bulgaru	(Italy) Federica Bilardo (Italy) Michele Alexandra Zmău	(India) Riya Bhatia (Romania) Ioana Mincă (United States) Maria Mateas (Romania) Gabriela Talabă
July 17	Târgu Jiu, Romania; Clay $15,000; Singles and doubles draws	(Australia) Samantha Harris (Australia) Belinda Woolcock; 0–6, 6–4, [10–4]	(Italy) Federica Bilardo (Italy) Michele Alexandra Zmău	(Italy) Federica Bilardo (Italy) Michele Alexandra Zmău	(India) Riya Bhatia (Romania) Ioana Mincă (United States) Maria Mateas (Romania) Gabriela Talabă
July 17	Don Benito, Spain; Carpet $15,000; Singles and doubles draws	(Switzerland) Lisa Sabino; 6–1, 6–2	(Spain) María José Luque Moreno	(United Kingdom) Gabriella Taylor (Malta) Helene Pellicano	(Japan) Kana Daniel (Republic of Ireland) Sinéad Lohan (Spain) Olga Parres Azcoitia (Portugal) Maria João Koehler
July 17	Don Benito, Spain; Carpet $15,000; Singles and doubles draws	(Italy) Maria Masini (Spain) Olga Parres Azcoitia; 6–3, 6–3	(Finland) Mia Eklund (United Kingdom) Gabriella Taylor	(United Kingdom) Gabriella Taylor (Malta) Helene Pellicano	(Japan) Kana Daniel (Republic of Ireland) Sinéad Lohan (Spain) Olga Parres Azcoitia (Portugal) Maria João Koehler
July 17	Hua Hin, Thailand; Hard $15,000; Singles and doubles draws	(Chinese Taipei) Lee Hua-chen; 6–2, 3–0, ret.	(Thailand) Bunyawi Thamchaiwat	(India) Dhruthi Tatachar Venugopal (Thailand) Patcharin Cheapchandej	(Oman) Fatma Al-Nabhani (Australia) Michaela Haet (Japan) Risa Ushijima (Australia) Masa Jovanovic
July 17	Hua Hin, Thailand; Hard $15,000; Singles and doubles draws	(Thailand) Nudnida Luangnam (Thailand) Varunya Wongteanchai; 6–2, 7–6^{(7–5)}	(Thailand) Patcharin Cheapchandej (South Korea) Han Sung-hee	(India) Dhruthi Tatachar Venugopal (Thailand) Patcharin Cheapchandej	(Oman) Fatma Al-Nabhani (Australia) Michaela Haet (Japan) Risa Ushijima (Australia) Masa Jovanovic
July 24	Advantage Cars Prague Open; Prague, Czech Republic; Clay $80,000; Singles – Doubles	(Czech Republic) Markéta Vondroušová; 7–5, 6–1	(Czech Republic) Karolína Muchová	(Czech Republic) Denisa Allertová (Italy) Camilla Rosatello	(Slovakia) Chantal Škamlová (Ukraine) Anhelina Kalinina (Switzerland) Amra Sadiković (Ukraine) Dayana Yastremska
July 24	Advantage Cars Prague Open; Prague, Czech Republic; Clay $80,000; Singles – Doubles	(Russia) Anastasia Potapova (Ukraine) Dayana Yastremska; 6–2, 6–2	(Romania) Mihaela Buzărnescu (Ukraine) Alona Fomina	(Czech Republic) Denisa Allertová (Italy) Camilla Rosatello	(Slovakia) Chantal Škamlová (Ukraine) Anhelina Kalinina (Switzerland) Amra Sadiković (Ukraine) Dayana Yastremska
July 24	Challenger de Granby; Granby, Canada; Hard $60,000; Singles – Doubles	(Italy) Cristiana Ferrando; 6–2, 6–3	(Canada) Katherine Sebov	(France) Jessika Ponchet (Czech Republic) Marie Bouzková	(Japan) Mayo Hibi (Germany) Sarah-Rebecca Sekulic (Belgium) An-Sophie Mestach (United Kingdom) Katie Boulter
July 24	Challenger de Granby; Granby, Canada; Hard $60,000; Singles – Doubles	(Australia) Ellen Perez (Canada) Carol Zhao; 6–2, 6–2	(Chile) Alexa Guarachi (Australia) Olivia Tjandramulia	(France) Jessika Ponchet (Czech Republic) Marie Bouzková	(Japan) Mayo Hibi (Germany) Sarah-Rebecca Sekulic (Belgium) An-Sophie Mestach (United Kingdom) Katie Boulter
July 24	FSP Gold River Women's Challenger; Sacramento, United States; Hard $60,000; Singles – Doubles	(United States) Amanda Anisimova; Walkover	(Croatia) Ajla Tomljanović	(United States) Sofia Kenin (United States) Kristie Ahn	(United States) Jennifer Brady (United States) Irina Falconi (South Africa) Chanel Simmonds (United States) Danielle Collins
July 24	FSP Gold River Women's Challenger; Sacramento, United States; Hard $60,000; Singles – Doubles	(United States) Desirae Krawczyk (Mexico) Giuliana Olmos; 6–1, 6–2	(Serbia) Jovana Jakšić (Belarus) Vera Lapko	(United States) Sofia Kenin (United States) Kristie Ahn	(United States) Jennifer Brady (United States) Irina Falconi (South Africa) Chanel Simmonds (United States) Danielle Collins
July 24	Horb am Neckar, Germany; Clay $25,000; Singles and doubles draws	(Switzerland) Patty Schnyder; 6–3, 6–1	(Switzerland) Conny Perrin	(Netherlands) Lesley Kerkhove (Japan) Misa Eguchi	(Ukraine) Olga Ianchuk (Austria) Julia Grabher (Germany) Julia Wachaczyk (Switzerland) Rebeka Masarova
July 24	Horb am Neckar, Germany; Clay $25,000; Singles and doubles draws	(Netherlands) Lesley Kerkhove (Netherlands) Bibiane Schoofs; 7–5, 6–3	(Hungary) Ágnes Bukta (Bulgaria) Isabella Shinikova	(Netherlands) Lesley Kerkhove (Japan) Misa Eguchi	(Ukraine) Olga Ianchuk (Austria) Julia Grabher (Germany) Julia Wachaczyk (Switzerland) Rebeka Masarova
July 24	Hua Hin, Thailand; Hard $25,000; Singles and doubles draws	(Thailand) Luksika Kumkhum; 7–5, 6–7^{(4–7)}, 6–3	(Russia) Alisa Kleybanova	(Australia) Naiktha Bains (Japan) Kyōka Okamura	(Kazakhstan) Kamila Kerimbayeva (India) Karman Kaur Thandi (Russia) Yana Sizikova (Thailand) Patcharin Cheapchandej
July 24	Hua Hin, Thailand; Hard $25,000; Singles and doubles draws	(Thailand) Luksika Kumkhum (Kyrgyzstan) Ksenia Palkina; 6–3, 2–6, [14–12]	(Australia) Naiktha Bains (Switzerland) Karin Kennel	(Australia) Naiktha Bains (Japan) Kyōka Okamura	(Kazakhstan) Kamila Kerimbayeva (India) Karman Kaur Thandi (Russia) Yana Sizikova (Thailand) Patcharin Cheapchandej
July 24	Torneio Internacional de Tênis Campos do Jordão; Campos do Jordão, Brazil; Hard $15,000; Singles and doubles draws	(Brazil) Nathaly Kurata; 7–6^{(9–7)}, 6–4	(Brazil) Gabriela Cé	(Chile) Bárbara Gatica (Brazil) Thaisa Grana Pedretti	(Brazil) Ingrid Gamarra Martins (Mexico) Andrea Renée Villarreall (Paraguay) Lara Escauriza (Argentina) Guillermina Naya
July 24	Torneio Internacional de Tênis Campos do Jordão; Campos do Jordão, Brazil; Hard $15,000; Singles and doubles draws	(Brazil) Gabriela Cé (Brazil) Thaisa Grana Pedretti; 7–5, 6–4	(Brazil) Nathaly Kurata (Brazil) Eduarda Piai	(Chile) Bárbara Gatica (Brazil) Thaisa Grana Pedretti	(Brazil) Ingrid Gamarra Martins (Mexico) Andrea Renée Villarreall (Paraguay) Lara Escauriza (Argentina) Guillermina Naya
July 24	Sharm El Sheikh, Egypt; Hard $15,000; Singles and doubles draws	(Greece) Eleni Kordolaimi; 6–4, 3–6, 6–2	(Egypt) Mayar Sherif	(Chinese Taipei) Chen Pei-hsuan (Japan) Ramu Ueda	(Russia) Elina Vikhryanova (Belarus) Nika Shytkouskaya (Romania) Ana Bianca Mihăilă (Zimbabwe) Valeria Bhunu
July 24	Sharm El Sheikh, Egypt; Hard $15,000; Singles and doubles draws	(Chinese Taipei) Chen Pei-hsuan (Chinese Taipei) Wu Fang-hsien; 6–2, 6–1	(Romania) Ana Bianca Mihăilă (China) Zhao Xiaoxi	(Chinese Taipei) Chen Pei-hsuan (Japan) Ramu Ueda	(Russia) Elina Vikhryanova (Belarus) Nika Shytkouskaya (Romania) Ana Bianca Mihăilă (Zimbabwe) Valeria Bhunu
July 24	Pärnu, Estonia; Clay $15,000; Singles and doubles draws	(Estonia) Kaia Kanepi; 6–1, 6–0	(Russia) Polina Golubovskaya	(Belarus) Katyarina Paulenka (Latvia) Laura Gulbe	(Russia) Maria Solnyshkina (Germany) Amelie Intert (Russia) Sofya Golubovskaya (Germany) Sophia Intert
July 24	Pärnu, Estonia; Clay $15,000; Singles and doubles draws	(Romania) Cristina Adamescu (Poland) Paulina Czarnik; 6–3, 3–6, [10–5]	(Russia) Polina Golubovskaya (Russia) Sofya Golubovskaya	(Belarus) Katyarina Paulenka (Latvia) Laura Gulbe	(Russia) Maria Solnyshkina (Germany) Amelie Intert (Russia) Sofya Golubovskaya (Germany) Sophia Intert
July 24	Tampere Open; Tampere, Finland; Clay $15,000; Singles and doubles draws	(Czech Republic) Monika Kilnarová; 7–6^{(7–5)}, 6–7^{(5–7)}, 6–4	(Belgium) Marie Benoît	(France) Clothilde de Bernardi (France) Estelle Cascino	(Serbia) Bojana Marinković (Romania) Daiana Negreanu (Slovakia) Kristína Schmiedlová (Finland) Piia Suomalainen
July 24	Tampere Open; Tampere, Finland; Clay $15,000; Singles and doubles draws	(Russia) Anna Iakovleva (Ukraine) Gyulnara Nazarova; Walkover	(Belgium) Marie Benoît (France) Estelle Cascino	(France) Clothilde de Bernardi (France) Estelle Cascino	(Serbia) Bojana Marinković (Romania) Daiana Negreanu (Slovakia) Kristína Schmiedlová (Finland) Piia Suomalainen
July 24	Les Contamines-Montjoie, France; Hard $15,000; Singles and doubles draws	(Spain) Claudia Hoste Ferrer; 7–5, 6–1	(France) Théo Gravouil	(France) Clara Burel (Germany) Yana Morderger	(Germany) Tayisiya Morderger (Italy) Ludmila Samsonova (The Bahamas) Kerrie Cartwright (Switzerland) Tess Sugnaux
July 24	Les Contamines-Montjoie, France; Hard $15,000; Singles and doubles draws	(Germany) Tayisiya Morderger (Germany) Yana Morderger; 2–6, 6–4, [10–7]	(The Bahamas) Kerrie Cartwright (United States) Kariann Pierre-Louis	(France) Clara Burel (Germany) Yana Morderger	(Germany) Tayisiya Morderger (Italy) Ludmila Samsonova (The Bahamas) Kerrie Cartwright (Switzerland) Tess Sugnaux
July 24	Hong Kong; Hard $15,000; Singles and doubles draws	(Hong Kong) Zhang Ling; 6–1, 6–3	(Japan) Kumi So	(India) Kanika Vaidya (Chinese Taipei) Cho I-hsuan	(China) Sheng Yuqi (Japan) Michika Ozeki (Japan) Sari Baba (India) Prerna Bhambri
July 24	Hong Kong; Hard $15,000; Singles and doubles draws	(Japan) Akari Inoue (Japan) Michika Ozeki; 6–4, 6–2	(Japan) Sari Baba (China) Sheng Yuqi	(India) Kanika Vaidya (Chinese Taipei) Cho I-hsuan	(China) Sheng Yuqi (Japan) Michika Ozeki (Japan) Sari Baba (India) Prerna Bhambri
July 24	Dublin, Ireland; Carpet $15,000; Singles and doubles draws	(United Kingdom) Jodie Anna Burrage; 7–6^{(7–5)}, 6–4	(Republic of Ireland) Sinéad Lohan	(United Kingdom) Emily Appleton (United States) Quinn Gleason	(Netherlands) Rosalie van der Hoek (Republic of Ireland) Anna Bowtell (United Kingdom) Laura Deigman (United Kingdom) Sarah Beth Grey
July 24	Dublin, Ireland; Carpet $15,000; Singles and doubles draws	(Italy) Giorgia Marchetti (Netherlands) Rosalie van der Hoek; 7–5, 6–4	(United Kingdom) Emily Appleton (United States) Quinn Gleason	(United Kingdom) Emily Appleton (United States) Quinn Gleason	(Netherlands) Rosalie van der Hoek (Republic of Ireland) Anna Bowtell (United Kingdom) Laura Deigman (United Kingdom) Sarah Beth Grey
July 24	Schio, Italy; Clay $15,000; Singles and doubles draws	(Italy) Stefania Rubini; 6–7^{(4–7)}, 6–3, 6–4	(Italy) Anastasia Grymalska	(Italy) Federica Di Sarra (Croatia) Ana Biškić	(Brazil) Paula Cristina Gonçalves (Italy) Beatrice Torelli (Russia) Maria Marfutina (Italy) Monica Cappelletti
July 24	Schio, Italy; Clay $15,000; Singles and doubles draws	(Italy) Federica Di Sarra (Switzerland) Lisa Sabino; 6–0, 6–1	(Italy) Anastasia Grymalska (Italy) Maria Masini	(Italy) Federica Di Sarra (Croatia) Ana Biškić	(Brazil) Paula Cristina Gonçalves (Italy) Beatrice Torelli (Russia) Maria Marfutina (Italy) Monica Cappelletti
July 24	Târgu Jiu, Romania; Clay $15,000; Singles and doubles draws	(Australia) Astra Sharma; 1–6, 6–2, 7–5	(Australia) Belinda Woolcock	(Romania) Oana Gavrilă (Romania) Miriam Bianca Bulgaru	(Romania) Elena Bogdan (Romania) Gabriela Talabă (Italy) Martina Colmegna (Italy) Vittoria Avvantaggiati
July 24	Târgu Jiu, Romania; Clay $15,000; Singles and doubles draws	(Australia) Samantha Harris (Australia) Belinda Woolcock; 6–3, 6–2	(India) Riya Bhatia (Romania) Oana Gavrilă	(Romania) Oana Gavrilă (Romania) Miriam Bianca Bulgaru	(Romania) Elena Bogdan (Romania) Gabriela Talabă (Italy) Martina Colmegna (Italy) Vittoria Avvantaggiati
July 24	Evansville, United States; Hard $15,000; Singles and doubles draws	(United States) Ann Li; 4–6, 6–4, 6–3	(Mexico) Marcela Zacarías	(United States) Lorraine Guillermo (United States) Allie Kiick	(United States) Caitlin Whoriskey (United States) Caty McNally (United States) Kennedy Shaffer (Mexico) Sabastiani León
July 24	Evansville, United States; Hard $15,000; Singles and doubles draws	(United States) Lorraine Guillermo (United States) Madeleine Kobelt; 6–0, 6–3	(Brazil) Alice Garcia (United States) Lauren Proctor	(United States) Lorraine Guillermo (United States) Allie Kiick	(United States) Caitlin Whoriskey (United States) Caty McNally (United States) Kennedy Shaffer (Mexico) Sabastiani León
July 31	Kentucky Bank Tennis Championships; Lexington, United States; Hard $60,000; Singles – Doubles	(United States) Grace Min; 6–4, 6–1	(United States) Sofia Kenin	(Belarus) Vera Lapko (United States) Emina Bektas	(United States) Allie Kiick (France) Tessah Andrianjafitrimo (United States) Amanda Anisimova (United States) Robin Anderson
July 31	Kentucky Bank Tennis Championships; Lexington, United States; Hard $60,000; Singles – Doubles	(Australia) Priscilla Hon (Belarus) Vera Lapko; 6–3, 6–4	(Japan) Hiroko Kuwata (Russia) Valeria Savinykh	(Belarus) Vera Lapko (United States) Emina Bektas	(United States) Allie Kiick (France) Tessah Andrianjafitrimo (United States) Amanda Anisimova (United States) Robin Anderson
July 31	Bad Saulgau, Germany; Clay $25,000+H; Singles and doubles draws	(Romania) Elena-Gabriela Ruse; 6–1, 6–2	(United States) Chiara Scholl	(Italy) Jessica Pieri (Germany) Katharina Hobgarski	(Russia) Amina Anshba (Slovakia) Lenka Juríková (France) Fiona Ferro (Slovenia) Dalila Jakupović
July 31	Bad Saulgau, Germany; Clay $25,000+H; Singles and doubles draws	(Russia) Anna Kalinskaya (Turkey) İpek Soylu; 6–2, 6–2	(Romania) Nicoleta Dascălu (Romania) Cristina Dinu	(Italy) Jessica Pieri (Germany) Katharina Hobgarski	(Russia) Amina Anshba (Slovakia) Lenka Juríková (France) Fiona Ferro (Slovenia) Dalila Jakupović
July 31	Open Castilla y León; El Espinar, Spain; Hard $25,000; Singles and doubles draws	(Spain) Paula Badosa Gibert; 6–2, 6–4	(Turkey) Ayla Aksu	(Spain) Rocío de la Torre Sánchez (Spain) Ainhoa Atucha Gómez	(Spain) Marina Bassols Ribera (Mexico) Renata Zarazúa (France) Harmony Tan (Netherlands) Bibiane Schoofs
July 31	Open Castilla y León; El Espinar, Spain; Hard $25,000; Singles and doubles draws	(United States) Quinn Gleason (Brazil) Luisa Stefani; 6–3, 6–2	(Turkey) Ayla Aksu (Netherlands) Bibiane Schoofs	(Spain) Rocío de la Torre Sánchez (Spain) Ainhoa Atucha Gómez	(Spain) Marina Bassols Ribera (Mexico) Renata Zarazúa (France) Harmony Tan (Netherlands) Bibiane Schoofs
July 31	Aegon GB Pro-Series Foxhills; Woking, United Kingdom; Hard $25,000; Singles and doubles draws	(Italy) Jasmine Paolini; 6–4, 1–6, 6–4	(Romania) Mihaela Buzărnescu	(Russia) Vitalia Diatchenko (Latvia) Diāna Marcinkēviča	(France) Myrtille Georges (Spain) María Teresa Torró Flor (Netherlands) Lesley Kerkhove (Chinese Taipei) Lee Ya-hsuan
July 31	Aegon GB Pro-Series Foxhills; Woking, United Kingdom; Hard $25,000; Singles and doubles draws	(Romania) Laura-Ioana Andrei (Czech Republic) Petra Krejsová; 4–6, 6–2, [11–9]	(Romania) Mihaela Buzărnescu (Poland) Justyna Jegiołka	(Russia) Vitalia Diatchenko (Latvia) Diāna Marcinkēviča	(France) Myrtille Georges (Spain) María Teresa Torró Flor (Netherlands) Lesley Kerkhove (Chinese Taipei) Lee Ya-hsuan
July 31	Fort Worth, United States; Hard $25,000; Singles and doubles draws	(United States) Katerina Stewart; 6–4, 6–1	(Colombia) Emiliana Arango	(Japan) Miharu Imanishi (Mexico) Marcela Zacarías	(South Africa) Chanel Simmonds (Mexico) Giuliana Olmos (United States) Lauren Albanese (Japan) Mai Minokoshi
July 31	Fort Worth, United States; Hard $25,000; Singles and doubles draws	(Mexico) Giuliana Olmos (Australia) Ellen Perez; 6–4, 6–3	(Japan) Miharu Imanishi (Japan) Ayaka Okuno	(Japan) Miharu Imanishi (Mexico) Marcela Zacarías	(South Africa) Chanel Simmonds (Mexico) Giuliana Olmos (United States) Lauren Albanese (Japan) Mai Minokoshi
July 31	Sharm El Sheikh, Egypt; Hard $15,000; Singles and doubles draws	(Greece) Eleni Kordolaimi; 6–2, 6–3	(Belarus) Nika Shytkouskaya	(Sweden) Linnéa Malmqvist (Romania) Ana Bianca Mihăilă	(Egypt) Mayar Sherif (New Zealand) Emily Fanning (Russia) Anzhelika Isaeva (Russia) Angelina Zhuravleva
July 31	Sharm El Sheikh, Egypt; Hard $15,000; Singles and doubles draws	(Chinese Taipei) Chen Pei-hsuan (Chinese Taipei) Wu Fang-hsien; 6–4, 6–2	(Romania) Ana Bianca Mihăilă (China) Zhao Xiaoxi	(Sweden) Linnéa Malmqvist (Romania) Ana Bianca Mihăilă	(Egypt) Mayar Sherif (New Zealand) Emily Fanning (Russia) Anzhelika Isaeva (Russia) Angelina Zhuravleva
July 31	Savitaipale, Finland; Clay $15,000; Singles and doubles draws	(France) Clothilde de Bernardi; 6–3, 6–1	(Czech Republic) Monika Kilnarová	(Germany) Amelie Intert (Russia) Daria Kruzhkova	(Belgium) Marie Benoît (Latvia) Irina Lapustina (Russia) Sofya Golubovskaya (Finland) Oona Orpana
July 31	Savitaipale, Finland; Clay $15,000; Singles and doubles draws	(Russia) Valeriya Denisenko (Russia) Ekaterina Shalimova; 7–6^{(8–6)}, 4–6, [10–6]	(Russia) Aleksandra Kuznetsova (Ukraine) Gyulnara Nazarova	(Germany) Amelie Intert (Russia) Daria Kruzhkova	(Belgium) Marie Benoît (Latvia) Irina Lapustina (Russia) Sofya Golubovskaya (Finland) Oona Orpana
July 31	Porto, Portugal; Clay $15,000; Singles and doubles draws	(Slovakia) Michaela Hončová; 5–7, 6–1, 7–5	(France) Sara Cakarevic	(United Kingdom) Emily Arbuthnott (Italy) Lucrezia Stefanini	(France) Salma Djoubri (Italy) Gaia Sanesi (Portugal) Inês Murta (Argentina) Carla Lucero
July 31	Porto, Portugal; Clay $15,000; Singles and doubles draws	(United Kingdom) Emily Arbuthnott (Denmark) Emilie Francati; 6–4, 6–3	(Italy) Gaia Sanesi (Italy) Lucrezia Stefanini	(United Kingdom) Emily Arbuthnott (Italy) Lucrezia Stefanini	(France) Salma Djoubri (Italy) Gaia Sanesi (Portugal) Inês Murta (Argentina) Carla Lucero
July 31	Târgu Jiu, Romania; Clay $15,000; Singles and doubles draws	(Romania) Ilona Georgiana Ghioroaie; 6–3, 3–6, 7–6^{(9–7)}	(Slovakia) Tereza Mihalíková	(Italy) Nastassja Burnett (Australia) Astra Sharma	(Romania) Jaqueline Cristian (Italy) Angelica Moratelli (Romania) Elena Bogdan (Romania) Oana Gavrilă
July 31	Târgu Jiu, Romania; Clay $15,000; Singles and doubles draws	(Australia) Samantha Harris (Australia) Belinda Woolcock; 6–1, 7–5	(Russia) Margarita Lazareva (Serbia) Milana Spremo	(Italy) Nastassja Burnett (Australia) Astra Sharma	(Romania) Jaqueline Cristian (Italy) Angelica Moratelli (Romania) Elena Bogdan (Romania) Oana Gavrilă
July 31	Nonthaburi, Thailand; Hard $15,000; Singles and doubles draws	(Japan) Haruka Kaji; 6–4, 6–1	(Chinese Taipei) Lee Hua-chen	(Australia) Alison Bai (India) Pranjala Yadlapalli	(Thailand) Patcharin Cheapchandej (United Kingdom) Suzy Larkin (Thailand) Watsachol Sawasdee (Thailand) Varunya Wongteanchai
July 31	Nonthaburi, Thailand; Hard $15,000; Singles and doubles draws	(Indonesia) Beatrice Gumulya (Indonesia) Jessy Rompies; 6–0, 7–6^{(7–5)}	(Thailand) Tamachan Momkoonthod (India) Pranjala Yadlapalli	(Australia) Alison Bai (India) Pranjala Yadlapalli	(Thailand) Patcharin Cheapchandej (United Kingdom) Suzy Larkin (Thailand) Watsachol Sawasdee (Thailand) Varunya Wongteanchai
July 31	Istanbul, Turkey; Clay $15,000; Singles and doubles draws	(Georgia (country)) Ekaterine Gorgodze; 6–3, 6–1	(Bulgaria) Gebriela Mihaylova	(France) Joséphine Boualem (Bulgaria) Petia Arshinkova	(Japan) Chihiro Muramatsu (Bulgaria) Dia Evtimova (Turkey) Melis Sezer (Croatia) Ena Kajević
July 31	Istanbul, Turkey; Clay $15,000; Singles and doubles draws	(Bulgaria) Dia Evtimova (Bosnia and Herzegovina) Jasmina Tinjić; 6–4, 6–2	(Japan) Chihiro Muramatsu (Turkey) Melis Sezer	(France) Joséphine Boualem (Bulgaria) Petia Arshinkova	(Japan) Chihiro Muramatsu (Bulgaria) Dia Evtimova (Turkey) Melis Sezer (Croatia) Ena Kajević
July 31	Ivano-Frankivsk, Ukraine; Clay $15,000; Singles and doubles draws	(Ukraine) Maryna Chernyshova; 6–4, 3–6, 6–0	(Switzerland) Karin Kennel	(Germany) Lisa Matviyenko (Ukraine) Oleksandra Korashvili	(Ukraine) Oleksandra Andrieieva (Romania) Elena-Teodora Cadar (Ukraine) Veronika Kapshay (Croatia) Mariana Dražić
July 31	Ivano-Frankivsk, Ukraine; Clay $15,000; Singles and doubles draws	(Ukraine) Maryna Chernyshova (Ukraine) Veronika Kapshay; 4–6, 6–2, [11–9]	(Romania) Elena-Teodora Cadar (Ukraine) Oleksandra Korashvili	(Germany) Lisa Matviyenko (Ukraine) Oleksandra Korashvili	(Ukraine) Oleksandra Andrieieva (Romania) Elena-Teodora Cadar (Ukraine) Veronika Kapshay (Croatia) Mariana Dražić

=== August ===
Week of	Tournament	Winner	Runners-up	Semifinalists	Quarterfinalists
August 7	Ladies Open Hechingen; Hechingen, Germany; Clay $60,000; Singles – Doubles	(Germany) Tamara Korpatsch; 2–6, 7–6^{(7–5)}, 6–2	(Italy) Deborah Chiesa	(Slovakia) Chantal Škamlová (Romania) Alexandra Cadanțu	(Switzerland) Patty Schnyder (Germany) Anna Gabric (Poland) Magdalena Fręch (Italy) Jessica Pieri
August 7	Ladies Open Hechingen; Hechingen, Germany; Clay $60,000; Singles – Doubles	(Italy) Camilla Rosatello (Georgia (country)) Sofia Shapatava; 6–2, 6–4	(Germany) Romy Kölzer (Germany) Lena Rüffer	(Slovakia) Chantal Škamlová (Romania) Alexandra Cadanțu	(Switzerland) Patty Schnyder (Germany) Anna Gabric (Poland) Magdalena Fręch (Italy) Jessica Pieri
August 7	Koksijde, Belgium; Clay $25,000+H; Singles and doubles draws	(Australia) Isabelle Wallace; 4–6, 6–4, 6–3	(Netherlands) Bibiane Schoofs	(Ukraine) Ganna Poznikhirenko (Netherlands) Cindy Burger	(Ukraine) Valeriya Strakhova (India) Ankita Raina (France) Fiona Ferro (Venezuela) Aymet Uzcátegui
August 7	Koksijde, Belgium; Clay $25,000+H; Singles and doubles draws	(India) Ankita Raina (Netherlands) Bibiane Schoofs; 3–6, 6–3, [11–9]	(Belgium) Marie Benoît (Belgium) Magali Kempen	(Ukraine) Ganna Poznikhirenko (Netherlands) Cindy Burger	(Ukraine) Valeriya Strakhova (India) Ankita Raina (France) Fiona Ferro (Venezuela) Aymet Uzcátegui
August 7	Chiswick, United Kingdom; Hard $25,000; Singles and doubles draws	(Russia) Vitalia Diatchenko; 6–3, 6–4	(Slovakia) Viktória Kužmová	(Netherlands) Lesley Kerkhove (Switzerland) Jil Teichmann	(Bulgaria) Elitsa Kostova (Latvia) Diāna Marcinkēviča (France) Myrtille Georges (United Kingdom) Samantha Murray
August 7	Chiswick, United Kingdom; Hard $25,000; Singles and doubles draws	(Romania) Laura-Ioana Andrei (Germany) Julia Wachaczyk; 7–5, 7–5	(United Kingdom) Katy Dunne (Bulgaria) Elitsa Kostova	(Netherlands) Lesley Kerkhove (Switzerland) Jil Teichmann	(Bulgaria) Elitsa Kostova (Latvia) Diāna Marcinkēviča (France) Myrtille Georges (United Kingdom) Samantha Murray
August 7	Landisville, United States; Hard $25,000; Singles and doubles draws	(Belarus) Vera Lapko; 4–6, 6–4, 7–6^{(7–4)}	(Slovakia) Anna Karolína Schmiedlová	(United States) Maria Sanchez (Japan) Hiroko Kuwata	(Japan) Miharu Imanishi (Japan) Mayo Hibi (Japan) Mari Osaka (United States) Jessica Pegula
August 7	Landisville, United States; Hard $25,000; Singles and doubles draws	(United States) Sophie Chang (United States) Alexandra Mueller; 4–6, 6–3, [10–5]	(Russia) Ksenia Lykina (United Kingdom) Emily Webley-Smith	(United States) Maria Sanchez (Japan) Hiroko Kuwata	(Japan) Miharu Imanishi (Japan) Mayo Hibi (Japan) Mari Osaka (United States) Jessica Pegula
August 7	Vienna, Austria; Clay $15,000; Singles and doubles draws	(France) Clothilde de Bernardi; 6–1, 6–2	(Czech Republic) Gabriela Pantůčková	(Australia) Astra Sharma (Italy) Anastasia Grymalska	(Moldova) Anastasia Dețiuc (Australia) Samantha Harris (Austria) Pia König (Australia) Nina Alibalić
August 7	Vienna, Austria; Clay $15,000; Singles and doubles draws	(Italy) Anastasia Grymalska (Italy) Dalila Spiteri; 0–6, 6–3, [10–8]	(Mexico) Ana Sofía Sánchez (Italy) Lucrezia Stefanini	(Australia) Astra Sharma (Italy) Anastasia Grymalska	(Moldova) Anastasia Dețiuc (Australia) Samantha Harris (Austria) Pia König (Australia) Nina Alibalić
August 7	Mrągowo, Poland; Clay $15,000; Singles and doubles draws	(Poland) Marta Leśniak; 6–4, 6–4	(Australia) Seone Mendez	(Slovakia) Kristína Schmiedlová (Czech Republic) Kateřina Vaňková	(United States) Jessica Ho (Czech Republic) Diana Šumová (Ukraine) Anastasiya Shoshyna (Russia) Valeriya Urzhumova
August 7	Mrągowo, Poland; Clay $15,000; Singles and doubles draws	(Belgium) Mathilde Devits (Netherlands) Merel Hoedt; 6–4, 6–2	(Czech Republic) Diana Šumová (France) Jade Suvrijn	(Slovakia) Kristína Schmiedlová (Czech Republic) Kateřina Vaňková	(United States) Jessica Ho (Czech Republic) Diana Šumová (Ukraine) Anastasiya Shoshyna (Russia) Valeriya Urzhumova
August 7	Arad, Romania; Clay $15,000; Singles and doubles draws	(Romania) Elena-Gabriela Ruse; 6–4, 6–1	(Slovenia) Nina Potočnik	(Slovakia) Tereza Mihalíková (Romania) Cristina Ene	(Romania) Oana Gavrilă (Romania) Elena Bogdan (Serbia) Bojana Marinković (Romania) Ilona Georgiana Ghioroaie
August 7	Arad, Romania; Clay $15,000; Singles and doubles draws	(Serbia) Tamara Čurović (Czech Republic) Vendula Žovincová; 6–1, 6–2	(Romania) Cristina Ene (Serbia) Bojana Marinković	(Slovakia) Tereza Mihalíková (Romania) Cristina Ene	(Romania) Oana Gavrilă (Romania) Elena Bogdan (Serbia) Bojana Marinković (Romania) Ilona Georgiana Ghioroaie
August 7	Moscow, Russia; Clay $15,000; Singles and doubles draws	(Belarus) Iryna Shymanovich; 6–2, 6–4	(Russia) Polina Leykina	(Russia) Aleksandra Pospelova (Kazakhstan) Anna Danilina	(Russia) Daria Kruzhkova (Russia) Aleksandra Vostrikova (Russia) Valeriya Yushchenko (Russia) Anastasia Gasanova
August 7	Moscow, Russia; Clay $15,000; Singles and doubles draws	(Belarus) Ilona Kremen (Belarus) Iryna Shymanovich; 6–4, 6–4	(Russia) Elina Avanesyan (Russia) Avelina Sayfetdinova	(Russia) Aleksandra Pospelova (Kazakhstan) Anna Danilina	(Russia) Daria Kruzhkova (Russia) Aleksandra Vostrikova (Russia) Valeriya Yushchenko (Russia) Anastasia Gasanova
August 7	Las Palmas, Spain; Clay $15,000; Singles and doubles draws	(Sweden) Cornelia Lister; 6–4, 6–4	(Italy) Gaia Sanesi	(Oman) Fatma Al-Nabhani (Austria) Melanie Klaffner	(Portugal) Inês Murta (Germany) Emily Seibold (France) Margot Yerolymos (Spain) Lucía Cortez Llorca
August 7	Las Palmas, Spain; Clay $15,000; Singles and doubles draws	(Spain) Carlota Molina Megías (Belarus) Anastasiya Yakimova; 6–4, 6–3	(Oman) Fatma Al-Nabhani (Spain) Arabela Fernández Rabener	(Oman) Fatma Al-Nabhani (Austria) Melanie Klaffner	(Portugal) Inês Murta (Germany) Emily Seibold (France) Margot Yerolymos (Spain) Lucía Cortez Llorca
August 7	Nonthaburi, Thailand; Hard $15,000; Singles and doubles draws	(Australia) Sara Tomic; 6–4, 4–6, 6–1	(China) Yuan Yue	(Russia) Alisa Kleybanova (Thailand) Chompoothip Jundakate	(India) Dhruthi Tatachar Venugopal (Kazakhstan) Kamila Kerimbayeva (Kyrgyzstan) Ksenia Palkina (United States) Lauren Marker
August 7	Nonthaburi, Thailand; Hard $15,000; Singles and doubles draws	(Thailand) Tamachan Momkoonthod (Thailand) Varunya Wongteanchai; 6–3, 6–4	(Australia) Genevieve Lorbergs (Singapore) Stefanie Tan	(Russia) Alisa Kleybanova (Thailand) Chompoothip Jundakate	(India) Dhruthi Tatachar Venugopal (Kazakhstan) Kamila Kerimbayeva (Kyrgyzstan) Ksenia Palkina (United States) Lauren Marker
August 7	Istanbul, Turkey; Clay $15,000; Singles and doubles draws	(Israel) Vlada Ekshibarova; 6–2, 6–1	(Germany) Dana Kremer	(Turkey) Berfu Cengiz (Belgium) Eliessa Vanlangendonck	(Ukraine) Oleksandra Piskun (France) Louise Lampla (Serbia) Tijana Spasojević (Romania) Elena-Teodora Cadar
August 7	Istanbul, Turkey; Clay $15,000; Singles and doubles draws	(Turkey) Berfu Cengiz (Turkey) İpek Öz; 6–4, 6–1	(Russia) Vasilisa Aponasenko (Croatia) Tea Faber	(Turkey) Berfu Cengiz (Belgium) Eliessa Vanlangendonck	(Ukraine) Oleksandra Piskun (France) Louise Lampla (Serbia) Tijana Spasojević (Romania) Elena-Teodora Cadar
August 14	Vancouver Open; Vancouver, Canada; Hard $100,000; Singles – Doubles	(Belgium) Maryna Zanevska; 5–7, 6–1, 6–3	(Montenegro) Danka Kovinić	(Canada) Carol Zhao (Croatia) Jana Fett	(Italy) Jasmine Paolini (Turkey) Ons Jabeur (Australia) Priscilla Hon (Japan) Nao Hibino
August 14	Vancouver Open; Vancouver, Canada; Hard $100,000; Singles – Doubles	(Australia) Jessica Moore (United Kingdom) Jocelyn Rae; 6–1, 7–5	(United States) Desirae Krawczyk (Mexico) Giuliana Olmos	(Canada) Carol Zhao (Croatia) Jana Fett	(Italy) Jasmine Paolini (Turkey) Ons Jabeur (Australia) Priscilla Hon (Japan) Nao Hibino
August 14	Leipzig, Germany; Clay $25,000; Singles and doubles draws	(Poland) Magdalena Fręch; 6–2, 7–6^{(7–3)}	(Netherlands) Richèl Hogenkamp	(Russia) Valentyna Ivakhnenko (Austria) Julia Grabher	(Germany) Lea Gasparovic (India) Ankita Raina (Greece) Despina Papamichail (Croatia) Tereza Mrdeža
August 14	Leipzig, Germany; Clay $25,000; Singles and doubles draws	(Russia) Valentyna Ivakhnenko (Belarus) Lidziya Marozava; 6–2, 6–1	(Croatia) Tereza Mrdeža (India) Ankita Raina	(Russia) Valentyna Ivakhnenko (Austria) Julia Grabher	(Germany) Lea Gasparovic (India) Ankita Raina (Greece) Despina Papamichail (Croatia) Tereza Mrdeža
August 14	Montreux, Switzerland; Clay $25,000; Singles and doubles draws	(Spain) María Teresa Torró Flor; 4–6, 6–1, 6–2	(Italy) Deborah Chiesa	(Belgium) Kimberley Zimmermann (Switzerland) Leonie Küng	(Bulgaria) Elitsa Kostova (Czech Republic) Johana Marková (Switzerland) Amra Sadiković (Switzerland) Ylena In-Albon
August 14	Montreux, Switzerland; Clay $25,000; Singles and doubles draws	(Switzerland) Xenia Knoll (Switzerland) Amra Sadiković; 6–2, 7–5	(Slovakia) Michaela Hončová (Bulgaria) Isabella Shinikova	(Belgium) Kimberley Zimmermann (Switzerland) Leonie Küng	(Bulgaria) Elitsa Kostova (Czech Republic) Johana Marková (Switzerland) Amra Sadiković (Switzerland) Ylena In-Albon
August 14	Nonthaburi, Thailand; Hard $25,000; Singles and doubles draws	(Thailand) Luksika Kumkhum; 7–5, 6–2	(China) Yuan Yue	(India) Karman Kaur Thandi (Japan) Junri Namigata	(India) Pranjala Yadlapalli (Japan) Kyōka Okamura (Singapore) Stefanie Tan (Japan) Miyabi Inoue
August 14	Nonthaburi, Thailand; Hard $25,000; Singles and doubles draws	(Chinese Taipei) Chan Chin-wei (South Korea) Choi Ji-hee; 2–6, 6–1, [13–11]	(Thailand) Varatchaya Wongteanchai (Thailand) Varunya Wongteanchai	(India) Karman Kaur Thandi (Japan) Junri Namigata	(India) Pranjala Yadlapalli (Japan) Kyōka Okamura (Singapore) Stefanie Tan (Japan) Miyabi Inoue
August 14	Graz, Austria; Clay $15,000; Singles and doubles draws	(Australia) Astra Sharma; 2–6, 6–3, 6–2	(Czech Republic) Vendula Žovincová	(Czech Republic) Magdaléna Pantůčková (Hungary) Anna Bondár	(Czech Republic) Gabriela Pantůčková (Czech Republic) Aneta Kladivová (Austria) Pia König (Slovenia) Nina Potočnik
August 14	Graz, Austria; Clay $15,000; Singles and doubles draws	(Hungary) Anna Bondár (Hungary) Réka Luca Jani; 6–4, 6–3	(Slovakia) Jana Jablonovská (Slovakia) Natália Vajdová	(Czech Republic) Magdaléna Pantůčková (Hungary) Anna Bondár	(Czech Republic) Gabriela Pantůčková (Czech Republic) Aneta Kladivová (Austria) Pia König (Slovenia) Nina Potočnik
August 14	International Country Cuneo; Cuneo, Italy; Clay $15,000; Singles and doubles draws	(Italy) Martina Colmegna; 6–7^{(2–7)}, 6–3, 6–3	(Italy) Federica Di Sarra	(Italy) Lucia Bronzetti (Italy) Anastasia Grymalska	(Italy) Camilla Abbate (Italy) Claudia Giovine (France) Vinciane Rémy (Russia) Maria Marfutina
August 14	International Country Cuneo; Cuneo, Italy; Clay $15,000; Singles and doubles draws	(Italy) Federica Di Sarra (Italy) Anastasia Grymalska; 6–0, 6–1	(Argentina) Melina Ferrero (Argentina) Sofía Luini	(Italy) Lucia Bronzetti (Italy) Anastasia Grymalska	(Italy) Camilla Abbate (Italy) Claudia Giovine (France) Vinciane Rémy (Russia) Maria Marfutina
August 14	Oldenzaal, Netherlands; Clay $15,000; Singles and doubles draws	(United States) Chiara Scholl; 6–1, 6–1	(Uzbekistan) Albina Khabibulina	(Germany) Tayisiya Morderger (Mexico) Ana Sofía Sánchez	(Netherlands) Suzan Lamens (Venezuela) Aymet Uzcátegui (Belgium) Catherine Chantraine (Germany) Julyette Steur
August 14	Oldenzaal, Netherlands; Clay $15,000; Singles and doubles draws	(Belgium) Déborah Kerfs (United States) Chiara Scholl; 7–5, 6–3	(Argentina) Paula Ormaechea (Mexico) Ana Sofía Sánchez	(Germany) Tayisiya Morderger (Mexico) Ana Sofía Sánchez	(Netherlands) Suzan Lamens (Venezuela) Aymet Uzcátegui (Belgium) Catherine Chantraine (Germany) Julyette Steur
August 14	Mrągowo, Poland; Clay $15,000; Singles and doubles draws	(Poland) Marta Leśniak; 5–7, 6–2, 6–2	(France) Jade Suvrijn	(United Kingdom) Maia Lumsden (Belarus) Yuliya Hatouka	(Sweden) Jacqueline Cabaj Awad (Ukraine) Anastasiya Shoshyna (Italy) Angelica Moratelli (Poland) Patrycja Polańska
August 14	Mrągowo, Poland; Clay $15,000; Singles and doubles draws	(Italy) Angelica Moratelli (France) Jade Suvrijn; 6–4, 6–4	(United Kingdom) Maia Lumsden (Ukraine) Anastasiya Shoshyna	(United Kingdom) Maia Lumsden (Belarus) Yuliya Hatouka	(Sweden) Jacqueline Cabaj Awad (Ukraine) Anastasiya Shoshyna (Italy) Angelica Moratelli (Poland) Patrycja Polańska
August 14	Moscow, Russia; Clay $15,000; Singles and doubles draws	(Belarus) Iryna Shymanovich; 6–1, 5–7, 7–5	(Russia) Yana Sizikova	(Kazakhstan) Anna Danilina (Russia) Vlada Koval	(Russia) Sofya Lansere (Russia) Varvara Gracheva (Belarus) Ilona Kremen (Russia) Alina Silich
August 14	Moscow, Russia; Clay $15,000; Singles and doubles draws	(Belarus) Ilona Kremen (Belarus) Iryna Shymanovich; 6–2, 6–0	(Russia) Aleksandra Kuznetsova (Russia) Sofya Lansere	(Kazakhstan) Anna Danilina (Russia) Vlada Koval	(Russia) Sofya Lansere (Russia) Varvara Gracheva (Belarus) Ilona Kremen (Russia) Alina Silich
August 14	Las Palmas, Spain; Clay $15,000; Singles and doubles draws	(Netherlands) Chayenne Ewijk; 4–6, 6–4, 6–2	(Sweden) Fanny Östlund	(Oman) Fatma Al-Nabhani (Spain) Guiomar Maristany	(Spain) Lucía Marzal Martínez (Spain) Ángela Fita Boluda (Portugal) Maria João Koehler (Portugal) Inês Murta
August 14	Las Palmas, Spain; Clay $15,000; Singles and doubles draws	(Oman) Fatma Al-Nabhani (Spain) Arabela Fernández Rabener; 2–6, 7–5, [10–5]	(Argentina) Victoria Bosio (Japan) Kana Daniel	(Oman) Fatma Al-Nabhani (Spain) Guiomar Maristany	(Spain) Lucía Marzal Martínez (Spain) Ángela Fita Boluda (Portugal) Maria João Koehler (Portugal) Inês Murta
August 21	Mençuna Cup; Artvin, Turkey; Hard $60,000; Singles – Doubles	(Russia) Valeria Savinykh; 3–6, 7–6^{(12–10)}, 7–6^{(7–5)}	(Turkey) Ayla Aksu	(Russia) Vitalia Diatchenko (Bosnia and Herzegovina) Dea Herdželaš	(Italy) Cristiana Ferrando (Russia) Anastasia Potapova (India) Ankita Raina (Croatia) Tereza Mrdeža
August 21	Mençuna Cup; Artvin, Turkey; Hard $60,000; Singles – Doubles	(Brazil) Gabriela Cé (India) Ankita Raina; 6–2, 6–3	(Bulgaria) Elitsa Kostova (Russia) Yana Sizikova	(Russia) Vitalia Diatchenko (Bosnia and Herzegovina) Dea Herdželaš	(Italy) Cristiana Ferrando (Russia) Anastasia Potapova (India) Ankita Raina (Croatia) Tereza Mrdeža
August 21	Braunschweig, Germany; Clay $25,000; Singles and doubles draws	(Poland) Magdalena Fręch; 6–1, 2–6, 7–6^{(7–3)}	(Spain) Olga Sáez Larra	(Romania) Jaqueline Cristian (Germany) Caroline Werner	(France) Fiona Ferro (Norway) Melanie Stokke (Latvia) Diāna Marcinkēviča (Netherlands) Cindy Burger
August 21	Braunschweig, Germany; Clay $25,000; Singles and doubles draws	(Sweden) Cornelia Lister (Spain) María Teresa Torró Flor; 3–6, 7–6^{(7–5)}, [11–9]	(Russia) Anastasiya Komardina (Latvia) Diāna Marcinkēviča	(Romania) Jaqueline Cristian (Germany) Caroline Werner	(France) Fiona Ferro (Norway) Melanie Stokke (Latvia) Diāna Marcinkēviča (Netherlands) Cindy Burger
August 21	Hódmezővásárhely, Hungary; Clay $25,000; Singles and doubles draws	(Romania) Alexandra Dulgheru; 7–5, 6–2	(Ukraine) Ganna Poznikhirenko	(Venezuela) Andrea Gámiz (Italy) Anastasia Grymalska	(Italy) Stefania Rubini (Argentina) Catalina Pella (Romania) Cristina Dinu (Slovakia) Vivien Juhászová
August 21	Hódmezővásárhely, Hungary; Clay $25,000; Singles and doubles draws	(Romania) Elena-Gabriela Ruse (Netherlands) Eva Wacanno; 6–3, 6–1	(Italy) Martina Di Giuseppe (Italy) Anna-Giulia Remondina	(Venezuela) Andrea Gámiz (Italy) Anastasia Grymalska	(Italy) Stefania Rubini (Argentina) Catalina Pella (Romania) Cristina Dinu (Slovakia) Vivien Juhászová
August 21	Tsukuba, Japan; Hard $25,000; Singles and doubles draws	(Hong Kong) Zhang Ling; 7–5, 7–6^{(7–4)}	(Canada) Carol Zhao	(Japan) Yuuki Tanaka (Japan) Miharu Imanishi	(South Korea) Kim Da-bin (Japan) Momoko Kobori (Japan) Erika Sema (Japan) Akiko Omae
August 21	Tsukuba, Japan; Hard $25,000; Singles and doubles draws	(Japan) Miharu Imanishi (Japan) Akiko Omae; 6–4, 6–4	(Australia) Naiktha Bains (Chinese Taipei) Hsu Chieh-yu	(Japan) Yuuki Tanaka (Japan) Miharu Imanishi	(South Korea) Kim Da-bin (Japan) Momoko Kobori (Japan) Erika Sema (Japan) Akiko Omae
August 21	Wanfercée-Baulet, Belgium; Clay $15,000; Singles and doubles draws	(Germany) Dana Kremer; 6–3, 4–6, 6–1	(France) Julie Gervais	(Germany) Stephanie Wagner (Belgium) Margaux Bovy	(Belgium) Lara Salden (Sweden) Anette Munozova (Belgium) Chelsea Vanhoutte (Belgium) Catherine Chantraine
August 21	Wanfercée-Baulet, Belgium; Clay $15,000; Singles and doubles draws	(Belgium) Lara Salden (Belgium) Chelsea Vanhoutte; 6–3, 7–6^{(7–3)}	(Spain) Helena Jansen Figueras (Portugal) Francisca Jorge	(Germany) Stephanie Wagner (Belgium) Margaux Bovy	(Belgium) Lara Salden (Sweden) Anette Munozova (Belgium) Chelsea Vanhoutte (Belgium) Catherine Chantraine
August 21	Sezze, Italy; Clay $15,000; Singles and doubles draws	(Russia) Maria Marfutina; 6–4, 6–4	(Italy) Claudia Giovine	(Switzerland) Tess Sugnaux (Italy) Giorgia Marchetti	(Italy) Tatiana Pieri (Italy) Bianca Turati (Italy) Federica Di Sarra (Italy) Dalila Spiteri
August 21	Sezze, Italy; Clay $15,000; Singles and doubles draws	(Italy) Federica Di Sarra (Italy) Giorgia Marchetti; 3–6, 6–3, [11–9]	(Russia) Maria Marfutina (Italy) Dalila Spiteri	(Switzerland) Tess Sugnaux (Italy) Giorgia Marchetti	(Italy) Tatiana Pieri (Italy) Bianca Turati (Italy) Federica Di Sarra (Italy) Dalila Spiteri
August 21	Rotterdam, Netherlands; Clay $15,000; Singles and doubles draws	(Denmark) Karen Barritza; 2–6, 6–4, 6–4	(Germany) Tayisiya Morderger	(United States) Chiara Scholl (Netherlands) Nina Kruijer	(Netherlands) Merel Hoedt (Norway) Malene Helgø (Italy) Martina Spigarelli (Argentina) Paula Ormaechea
August 21	Rotterdam, Netherlands; Clay $15,000; Singles and doubles draws	(Uzbekistan) Albina Khabibulina (Netherlands) Stéphanie Visscher; 7–6^{(7–3)}, 7–5	(Belgium) Déborah Kerfs (United States) Chiara Scholl	(United States) Chiara Scholl (Netherlands) Nina Kruijer	(Netherlands) Merel Hoedt (Norway) Malene Helgø (Italy) Martina Spigarelli (Argentina) Paula Ormaechea
August 21	Mrągowo, Poland; Clay $15,000; Singles and doubles draws	(France) Marine Partaud; 7–6^{(7–4)}, 6–1	(Czech Republic) Monika Kilnarová	(Slovakia) Tereza Mihalíková (Poland) Julia Oczachowska	(United Kingdom) Maia Lumsden (Lithuania) Joana Eidukonytė (Italy) Angelica Moratelli (Russia) Anna Ukolova
August 21	Mrągowo, Poland; Clay $15,000; Singles and doubles draws	(Italy) Angelica Moratelli (France) Marine Partaud; 6–2, 6–3	(United States) Akiko Okuda (Dominican Republic) Kelly Williford	(Slovakia) Tereza Mihalíková (Poland) Julia Oczachowska	(United Kingdom) Maia Lumsden (Lithuania) Joana Eidukonytė (Italy) Angelica Moratelli (Russia) Anna Ukolova
August 21	Bucharest, Romania; Clay $15,000; Singles and doubles draws	(Romania) Gabriela Talabă; 7–5, 6–4	(Argentina) Victoria Bosio	(Romania) Oana Georgeta Simion (Romania) Irina Fetecău	(Moldova) Adriana Sosnovschi (Romania) Ilona Georgiana Ghioroaie (Italy) Federica Bilardo (Romania) Cristina Adamescu
August 21	Bucharest, Romania; Clay $15,000; Singles and doubles draws	(Romania) Oana Georgeta Simion (Romania) Gabriela Talabă; 6–3, 0–6, [12–10]	(Romania) Elena Bogdan (Romania) Elena-Teodora Cadar	(Romania) Oana Georgeta Simion (Romania) Irina Fetecău	(Moldova) Adriana Sosnovschi (Romania) Ilona Georgiana Ghioroaie (Italy) Federica Bilardo (Romania) Cristina Adamescu
August 21	Vrnjačka Banja, Serbia; Clay $15,000; Singles and doubles draws	(Romania) Oana Gavrilă; 6–7^{(3–7)}, 6–4, 7–5	(Belgium) Marie Benoît	(Russia) Polina Golubovskaya (Bosnia and Herzegovina) Nefisa Berberović	(Serbia) Kristina Ostojić (Bosnia and Herzegovina) Zorica Spasojević (Japan) Satsuki Takamura (Croatia) Ana Biškić
August 21	Vrnjačka Banja, Serbia; Clay $15,000; Singles and doubles draws	(Romania) Oana Gavrilă (Australia) Jelena Stojanovic; 7–6^{(7–2)}, 6–3	(Russia) Polina Golubovskaya (Russia) Sofya Golubovskaya	(Russia) Polina Golubovskaya (Bosnia and Herzegovina) Nefisa Berberović	(Serbia) Kristina Ostojić (Bosnia and Herzegovina) Zorica Spasojević (Japan) Satsuki Takamura (Croatia) Ana Biškić
August 21	Caslano, Switzerland; Clay $15,000; Singles and doubles draws	(Switzerland) Karin Kennel; 6–3, 6–0	(Italy) Alberta Brianti	(Italy) Lucia Bronzetti (Switzerland) Leonie Küng	(Italy) Camilla Scala (Switzerland) Ylena In-Albon (Switzerland) Nina Stadler (Italy) Martina Colmegna
August 21	Caslano, Switzerland; Clay $15,000; Singles and doubles draws	(Switzerland) Susan Bandecchi (Switzerland) Lisa Sabino; 6–1, 6–2	(Italy) Chiara Giaquinta (Italy) Maria Aurelia Scotti	(Italy) Lucia Bronzetti (Switzerland) Leonie Küng	(Italy) Camilla Scala (Switzerland) Ylena In-Albon (Switzerland) Nina Stadler (Italy) Martina Colmegna
August 28	Ladies Open Dunakeszi; Dunakeszi, Hungary; Clay $60,000; Singles – Doubles	(Ukraine) Dayana Yastremska; 6–0, 6–1	(Ukraine) Katarina Zavatska	(Romania) Alexandra Cadanțu (Hungary) Panna Udvardy	(Czech Republic) Tereza Smitková (Romania) Irina Bara (Hungary) Ágnes Bukta (Hungary) Anna Bondár
August 28	Ladies Open Dunakeszi; Dunakeszi, Hungary; Clay $60,000; Singles – Doubles	(Romania) Irina Bara (Slovakia) Chantal Škamlová; 7–6^{(9–7)}, 6–4	(Romania) Alexandra Cadanțu (Czech Republic) Tereza Smitková	(Romania) Alexandra Cadanțu (Hungary) Panna Udvardy	(Czech Republic) Tereza Smitková (Romania) Irina Bara (Hungary) Ágnes Bukta (Hungary) Anna Bondár
August 28	Bagnatica, Italy; Clay $25,000; Singles and doubles draws	(Norway) Melanie Stokke; 7–6^{(8–6)}, 6–3	(Italy) Martina Trevisan	(Italy) Deborah Chiesa (Slovakia) Michaela Hončová	(Latvia) Diāna Marcinkēviča (Italy) Martina Caregaro (Austria) Julia Grabher (Liechtenstein) Kathinka von Deichmann
August 28	Bagnatica, Italy; Clay $25,000; Singles and doubles draws	(Italy) Deborah Chiesa (Italy) Martina Colmegna; 6–3, 4–6, [10–6]	(Austria) Julia Grabher (Norway) Melanie Stokke	(Italy) Deborah Chiesa (Slovakia) Michaela Hončová	(Latvia) Diāna Marcinkēviča (Italy) Martina Caregaro (Austria) Julia Grabher (Liechtenstein) Kathinka von Deichmann
August 28	Nanao, Japan; Carpet $25,000; Singles and doubles draws	(Canada) Carol Zhao; 6–3, 6–2	(Japan) Junri Namigata	(Japan) Miharu Imanishi (Australia) Naiktha Bains	(Japan) Ayano Shimizu (Japan) Miyabi Inoue (Japan) Nagi Hanatani (United Kingdom) Katy Dunne
August 28	Nanao, Japan; Carpet $25,000; Singles and doubles draws	(Chinese Taipei) Hsu Chieh-yu (Japan) Miharu Imanishi; 7–6^{(9–7)}, 6–2	(Japan) Akari Inoue (Japan) Miyabi Inoue	(Japan) Miharu Imanishi (Australia) Naiktha Bains	(Japan) Ayano Shimizu (Japan) Miyabi Inoue (Japan) Nagi Hanatani (United Kingdom) Katy Dunne
August 28	Almaty, Kazakhstan; Clay $25,000; Singles and doubles draws	(Russia) Polina Leykina; 6–3, 6–3	(Uzbekistan) Akgul Amanmuradova	(Israel) Vlada Ekshibarova (Georgia (country)) Ekaterine Gorgodze	(Uzbekistan) Nigina Abduraimova (Russia) Anna Morgina (Russia) Daria Lodikova (Russia) Alexandra Panova
August 28	Almaty, Kazakhstan; Clay $25,000; Singles and doubles draws	(Brazil) Gabriela Cé (Russia) Yana Sizikova; 6–4, 3–6, [10–7]	(Uzbekistan) Nigina Abduraimova (Uzbekistan) Akgul Amanmuradova	(Israel) Vlada Ekshibarova (Georgia (country)) Ekaterine Gorgodze	(Uzbekistan) Nigina Abduraimova (Russia) Anna Morgina (Russia) Daria Lodikova (Russia) Alexandra Panova
August 28	Mamaia, Romania; Clay $25,000; Singles and doubles draws	(Romania) Jaqueline Cristian; 6–2, 2–6, 6–3	(Romania) Cristina Dinu	(Romania) Irina Fetecău (Romania) Elena Bogdan	(Moldova) Alexandra Perper (Romania) Elena-Gabriela Ruse (Romania) Miriam Bianca Bulgaru (Russia) Anastasiya Komardina
August 28	Mamaia, Romania; Clay $25,000; Singles and doubles draws	(Russia) Anastasiya Komardina (Romania) Elena-Gabriela Ruse; 3–6, 6–1, [10–6]	(Bosnia and Herzegovina) Dea Herdželaš (Romania) Oana Georgeta Simion	(Romania) Irina Fetecău (Romania) Elena Bogdan	(Moldova) Alexandra Perper (Romania) Elena-Gabriela Ruse (Romania) Miriam Bianca Bulgaru (Russia) Anastasiya Komardina
August 28	Middelkerke, Belgium; Clay $15,000; Singles and doubles draws	(Belgium) Magali Kempen; 6–2, 6–2	(Germany) Julyette Steur	(France) Constance Sibille (Venezuela) Aymet Uzcátegui	(Belgium) Luna Meers (Germany) Vanessa Pinto (Belgium) Chelsea Vanhoutte (Belgium) Marie Benoît
August 28	Middelkerke, Belgium; Clay $15,000; Singles and doubles draws	(France) Sara Cakarevic (Belgium) Magali Kempen; 6–4, 4–6, [10–5]	(Romania) Cristina Adamescu (Spain) Cristina Bucșa	(France) Constance Sibille (Venezuela) Aymet Uzcátegui	(Belgium) Luna Meers (Germany) Vanessa Pinto (Belgium) Chelsea Vanhoutte (Belgium) Marie Benoît
August 28	Říčany, Czech Republic; Clay $15,000; Singles and doubles draws	(Czech Republic) Tereza Procházková; 5–7, 6–4, 6–4	(Czech Republic) Diana Šumová	(Slovakia) Jana Jablonovská (Slovenia) Nastja Kolar	(Czech Republic) Vendula Žovincová (Czech Republic) Johana Marková (Moldova) Anastasia Dețiuc (Germany) Lisa Ponomar
August 28	Říčany, Czech Republic; Clay $15,000; Singles and doubles draws	(Slovakia) Jana Jablonovská (Slovakia) Natália Vajdová; 6–1, 6–3	(Czech Republic) Karolína Beránková (Czech Republic) Veronika Vlkovská	(Slovakia) Jana Jablonovská (Slovenia) Nastja Kolar	(Czech Republic) Vendula Žovincová (Czech Republic) Johana Marková (Moldova) Anastasia Dețiuc (Germany) Lisa Ponomar
August 28	Schoonhoven, Netherlands; Clay $15,000; Singles and doubles draws	(Mexico) Ana Sofía Sánchez; 6–3, 6–4	(Russia) Marina Melnikova	(United States) Chiara Scholl (Netherlands) Chayenne Ewijk	(Spain) Meritxell Perera Ros (Denmark) Karen Barritza (Italy) Dalila Spiteri (Germany) Lisa-Marie Mätschke
August 28	Schoonhoven, Netherlands; Clay $15,000; Singles and doubles draws	(Belgium) Déborah Kerfs (United States) Chiara Scholl; 5–7, 6–2, [10–3]	(United States) Dasha Ivanova (Bulgaria) Ani Vangelova	(United States) Chiara Scholl (Netherlands) Chayenne Ewijk	(Spain) Meritxell Perera Ros (Denmark) Karen Barritza (Italy) Dalila Spiteri (Germany) Lisa-Marie Mätschke
August 28	Mrągowo, Poland; Clay $15,000; Singles and doubles draws	(Czech Republic) Monika Kilnarová; 7–5, 1–6, 6–1	(Poland) Marta Leśniak	(Slovakia) Tereza Mihalíková (United Kingdom) Maia Lumsden	(Italy) Angelica Moratelli (France) Marine Partaud (Russia) Aleksandra Vostrikova (Russia) Angelina Zhuravleva
August 28	Mrągowo, Poland; Clay $15,000; Singles and doubles draws	(Poland) Daria Kuczer (Poland) Marta Leśniak; 6–2, 6–3	(Italy) Angelica Moratelli (France) Marine Partaud	(Slovakia) Tereza Mihalíková (United Kingdom) Maia Lumsden	(Italy) Angelica Moratelli (France) Marine Partaud (Russia) Aleksandra Vostrikova (Russia) Angelina Zhuravleva
August 28	Yeongwol, South Korea; Hard $15,000; Singles and doubles draws	(United States) Hanna Chang; 7–5, 7–6^{(8–6)}	(South Korea) Kim Da-bin	(Chinese Taipei) Lee Pei-chi (Cambodia) Andrea Ka	(South Korea) Kim Na-ri (South Korea) Bae Do-hee (United Kingdom) Alicia Barnett (South Korea) Lee So-ra
August 28	Yeongwol, South Korea; Hard $15,000; Singles and doubles draws	(South Korea) Kim Na-ri (Chinese Taipei) Lee Pei-chi; 6–2, 6–2	(South Korea) Choi Ji-hee (South Korea) Kang Seo-kyung	(Chinese Taipei) Lee Pei-chi (Cambodia) Andrea Ka	(South Korea) Kim Na-ri (South Korea) Bae Do-hee (United Kingdom) Alicia Barnett (South Korea) Lee So-ra
August 28	Sion, Switzerland; Clay $15,000; Singles and doubles draws	(Switzerland) Susan Bandecchi; 6–2, 6–3	(Switzerland) Kristina Milenkovic	(Switzerland) Naïma Karamoko (Italy) Tatiana Pieri	(Sweden) Julia Rosenqvist (Italy) Alice Zapolla (Switzerland) Nina Stadler (Switzerland) Karin Kennel
August 28	Sion, Switzerland; Clay $15,000; Singles and doubles draws	(Switzerland) Naïma Karamoko (Switzerland) Nina Stadler; 3–6, 6–3, [10–8]	(France) Amandine Cazeaux (Spain) Claudia Hoste Ferrer	(Switzerland) Naïma Karamoko (Italy) Tatiana Pieri	(Sweden) Julia Rosenqvist (Italy) Alice Zapolla (Switzerland) Nina Stadler (Switzerland) Karin Kennel
August 28	Antalya, Turkey; Clay $15,000; Singles and doubles draws	(Greece) Despina Papamichail; 6–3, 6–3	(Chile) Bárbara Gatica	(Brazil) Carolina Alves (Czech Republic) Magdaléna Pantůčková	(Russia) Aleksandra Pospelova (Czech Republic) Simona Heinová (Moldova) Adriana Sosnovschi (Bulgaria) Julia Stamatova
August 28	Antalya, Turkey; Clay $15,000; Singles and doubles draws	(Russia) Aleksandra Pospelova (Moldova) Adriana Sosnovschi; 7–6^{(7–2)}, 7–5	(Paraguay) Lara Escauriza (Chile) Bárbara Gatica	(Brazil) Carolina Alves (Czech Republic) Magdaléna Pantůčková	(Russia) Aleksandra Pospelova (Czech Republic) Simona Heinová (Moldova) Adriana Sosnovschi (Bulgaria) Julia Stamatova

=== September ===
Week of	Tournament	Winner	Runners-up	Semifinalists	Quarterfinalists
September 4	Allianz Cup; Sofia, Bulgaria; Clay $25,000; Singles and doubles draws	(Bulgaria) Viktoriya Tomova; 7–6^{(9–7)}, 4–6, 6–3	(Italy) Jessica Pieri	(Romania) Raluca Georgiana Șerban (Turkey) Çağla Büyükakçay	(Romania) Oana Georgeta Simion (Romania) Jaqueline Cristian (Russia) Viktoria Kamenskaya (Romania) Elena-Gabriela Ruse
September 4	Allianz Cup; Sofia, Bulgaria; Clay $25,000; Singles and doubles draws	(Romania) Jaqueline Cristian (Russia) Anastasiya Komardina; 6–3, 6–0	(Greece) Valentini Grammatikopoulou (Romania) Elena-Gabriela Ruse	(Romania) Raluca Georgiana Șerban (Turkey) Çağla Büyükakçay	(Romania) Oana Georgeta Simion (Romania) Jaqueline Cristian (Russia) Viktoria Kamenskaya (Romania) Elena-Gabriela Ruse
September 4	Balatonboglár, Hungary; Clay $25,000; Singles and doubles draws	(Slovenia) Polona Hercog; 6–1, 6–2	(Hungary) Gréta Arn	(Romania) Irina Bara (Croatia) Tena Lukas	(Russia) Irina Khromacheva (Slovakia) Kristína Schmiedlová (Croatia) Tereza Mrdeža (Hungary) Anna Bondár
September 4	Balatonboglár, Hungary; Clay $25,000; Singles and doubles draws	(Russia) Irina Khromacheva (Latvia) Diāna Marcinkēviča; 6–4, 6–3	(Hungary) Ágnes Bukta (Slovakia) Vivien Juhászová	(Romania) Irina Bara (Croatia) Tena Lukas	(Russia) Irina Khromacheva (Slovakia) Kristína Schmiedlová (Croatia) Tereza Mrdeža (Hungary) Anna Bondár
September 4	Prague, Czech Republic; Clay $15,000; Singles and doubles draws	(France) Alice Ramé; 6–4, 5–4, ret.	(Belgium) Magali Kempen	(Czech Republic) Miriam Kolodziejová (Ukraine) Yuliya Lysa	(Serbia) Tamara Čurović (Czech Republic) Tereza Procházková (Czech Republic) Johana Marková (Moldova) Anastasia Dețiuc
September 4	Prague, Czech Republic; Clay $15,000; Singles and doubles draws	(Czech Republic) Kristýna Hrabalová (Czech Republic) Nikola Tomanová; 6–1, 6–3	(Moldova) Anastasia Dețiuc (Czech Republic) Johana Marková	(Czech Republic) Miriam Kolodziejová (Ukraine) Yuliya Lysa	(Serbia) Tamara Čurović (Czech Republic) Tereza Procházková (Czech Republic) Johana Marková (Moldova) Anastasia Dețiuc
September 4	Cairo, Egypt; Clay $15,000; Singles and doubles draws	(Spain) Nuria Párrizas Díaz; 6–4, 6–1	(Russia) Victoria Kan	(Russia) Anna Ureke (Italy) Claudia Franzè	(Slovakia) Tereza Mihalíková (Hungary) Naomi Totka (Germany) Jasmin Jebawy (Egypt) Lamis Alhussein Abdel Aziz
September 4	Cairo, Egypt; Clay $15,000; Singles and doubles draws	(Russia) Victoria Kan (Russia) Maria Zotova; 6–2, 6–0	(Italy) Federica Joe Gardella (Germany) Ina Kaufinger	(Russia) Anna Ureke (Italy) Claudia Franzè	(Slovakia) Tereza Mihalíková (Hungary) Naomi Totka (Germany) Jasmin Jebawy (Egypt) Lamis Alhussein Abdel Aziz
September 4	Badenweiler, Germany; Clay $15,000; Singles and doubles draws	(Germany) Katharina Gerlach; 6–4, 2–6, 6–4	(France) Priscilla Heise	(Belgium) Luna Meers (Australia) Nina Alibalić	(Germany) Mina Hodzic (Romania) Arina Gabriela Vasilescu (Germany) Katharina Hering (Bosnia and Herzegovina) Nefisa Berberović
September 4	Badenweiler, Germany; Clay $15,000; Singles and doubles draws	(Germany) Chantal Sauvant (Romania) Arina Gabriela Vasilescu; 4–6, 7–6^{(7–3)}, [10–7]	(Germany) Lisa-Marie Mätschke (Sweden) Anette Munozova	(Belgium) Luna Meers (Australia) Nina Alibalić	(Germany) Mina Hodzic (Romania) Arina Gabriela Vasilescu (Germany) Katharina Hering (Bosnia and Herzegovina) Nefisa Berberović
September 4	Trieste, Italy; Clay $15,000; Singles and doubles draws	(Italy) Martina Caregaro; 2–6, 6–1, 6–2	(Italy) Federica Di Sarra	(Argentina) Paula Ormaechea (Italy) Lucrezia Stefanini	(Italy) Camilla Scala (Italy) Claudia Giovine (Croatia) Ana Biškić (Serbia) Bojana Marinković
September 4	Trieste, Italy; Clay $15,000; Singles and doubles draws	(Italy) Martina Caregaro (Argentina) Paula Ormaechea; 5–7, 7–5, [10–1]	(Italy) Alice Balducci (Italy) Camilla Scala	(Argentina) Paula Ormaechea (Italy) Lucrezia Stefanini	(Italy) Camilla Scala (Italy) Claudia Giovine (Croatia) Ana Biškić (Serbia) Bojana Marinković
September 4	Kyoto, Japan; Hard (indoor) $15,000; Singles and doubles draws	(United Kingdom) Katy Dunne; 6–2, 7–6^{(7–2)}	(Japan) Michika Ozeki	(Italy) Giulia Gatto-Monticone (Japan) Haruka Kaji	(Japan) Himari Sato (Sweden) Kajsa Rinaldo Persson (United States) Lauren Albanese (Japan) Mei Yamaguchi
September 4	Kyoto, Japan; Hard (indoor) $15,000; Singles and doubles draws	(Japan) Akari Inoue (Japan) Michika Ozeki; 4–6, 6–3, [10–8]	(Japan) Ayaka Okuno (Sweden) Kajsa Rinaldo Persson	(Italy) Giulia Gatto-Monticone (Japan) Haruka Kaji	(Japan) Himari Sato (Sweden) Kajsa Rinaldo Persson (United States) Lauren Albanese (Japan) Mei Yamaguchi
September 4	Yeongwol, South Korea; Hard $15,000; Singles and doubles draws	(South Korea) Kim Da-bin; 7–6^{(12–10)}, 4–6, 6–3	(South Korea) Kim Na-ri	(Chinese Taipei) Lee Pei-chi (South Korea) Hong Seung-yeon	(Chinese Taipei) Lee Ya-hsuan (United Kingdom) Alicia Barnett (Chinese Taipei) Hsu Ching-wen (South Korea) Lee So-ra
September 4	Yeongwol, South Korea; Hard $15,000; Singles and doubles draws	(South Korea) Kim Na-ri (Chinese Taipei) Lee Pei-chi; 6–1, 7–5	(South Korea) Kim Da-bin (South Korea) Lee So-ra	(Chinese Taipei) Lee Pei-chi (South Korea) Hong Seung-yeon	(Chinese Taipei) Lee Ya-hsuan (United Kingdom) Alicia Barnett (Chinese Taipei) Hsu Ching-wen (South Korea) Lee So-ra
September 4	Hammamet, Tunisia; Clay $15,000; Singles and doubles draws	(United Kingdom) Emily Arbuthnott; 3–6, 7–5, 6–4	(United Kingdom) Francesca Jones	(Croatia) Mariana Dražić (France) Mylène Halemai	(Sweden) Rebecca Ehn (Argentina) Victoria Bosio (Portugal) Inês Murta (France) Manon Arcangioli
September 4	Hammamet, Tunisia; Clay $15,000; Singles and doubles draws	(Algeria) Inès Ibbou (Italy) Isabella Tcherkes Zade; 6–1, 6–4	(Argentina) Victoria Bosio (Colombia) María Fernanda Herazo	(Croatia) Mariana Dražić (France) Mylène Halemai	(Sweden) Rebecca Ehn (Argentina) Victoria Bosio (Portugal) Inês Murta (France) Manon Arcangioli
September 4	Antalya, Turkey; Clay $15,000; Singles and doubles draws	(Greece) Despina Papamichail; 6–1, 6–4	(Brazil) Carolina Alves	(Russia) Daria Nazarkina (Sweden) Fanny Östlund	(Moldova) Vitalia Stamat (Moldova) Adriana Sosnovschi (Chile) Bárbara Gatica (Russia) Aleksandra Pospelova
September 4	Antalya, Turkey; Clay $15,000; Singles and doubles draws	(Sweden) Fanny Östlund (Bosnia and Herzegovina) Jasmina Tinjić; 6–1, 6–2	(Russia) Anna Iakovleva (Ukraine) Gyulnara Nazarova	(Russia) Daria Nazarkina (Sweden) Fanny Östlund	(Moldova) Vitalia Stamat (Moldova) Adriana Sosnovschi (Chile) Bárbara Gatica (Russia) Aleksandra Pospelova
September 11	Engie Open de Biarritz; Biarritz, France; Clay $80,000; Singles – Doubles	(Romania) Mihaela Buzărnescu; 6–4, 6–3	(Switzerland) Patty Schnyder	(Switzerland) Jil Teichmann (Italy) Martina Trevisan	(Russia) Viktoria Kamenskaya (Slovenia) Polona Hercog (Turkey) Çağla Büyükakçay (Romania) Irina Bara
September 11	Engie Open de Biarritz; Biarritz, France; Clay $80,000; Singles – Doubles	(Romania) Irina Bara (Romania) Mihaela Buzărnescu; 6–3, 6–1	(Spain) Cristina Bucșa (Australia) Isabelle Wallace	(Switzerland) Jil Teichmann (Italy) Martina Trevisan	(Russia) Viktoria Kamenskaya (Slovenia) Polona Hercog (Turkey) Çağla Büyükakçay (Romania) Irina Bara
September 11	Red Rock Pro Open; Las Vegas, United States; Hard $60,000; Singles – Doubles	(Bulgaria) Sesil Karatantcheva; 6–4, 4–6, 7–5	(Bulgaria) Elitsa Kostova	(Mexico) Renata Zarazúa (Slovakia) Anna Karolína Schmiedlová	(United States) Louisa Chirico (Spain) Paula Badosa Gibert (Serbia) Ivana Jorović (United States) Maria Mateas
September 11	Red Rock Pro Open; Las Vegas, United States; Hard $60,000; Singles – Doubles	(Belgium) An-Sophie Mestach (United Kingdom) Laura Robson; 7–6^{(9–7)}, 7–6^{(7–2)}	(United States) Sophie Chang (United States) Alexandra Mueller	(Mexico) Renata Zarazúa (Slovakia) Anna Karolína Schmiedlová	(United States) Louisa Chirico (Spain) Paula Badosa Gibert (Serbia) Ivana Jorović (United States) Maria Mateas
September 11	Guiyang, China; Hard $25,000; Singles and doubles draws	(Belarus) Lidziya Marozava; 6–2, 6–4	(Uzbekistan) Sabina Sharipova	(United States) Bernarda Pera (China) Wei Zhanlan	(China) Zhang Kailin (China) Liu Fangzhou (China) Zhang Yuxuan (China) Sun Xuliu
September 11	Guiyang, China; Hard $25,000; Singles and doubles draws	(Belarus) Lidziya Marozava (Uzbekistan) Sabina Sharipova; 6–2, 6–3	(China) Jiang Xinyu (China) Tang Qianhui	(United States) Bernarda Pera (China) Wei Zhanlan	(China) Zhang Kailin (China) Liu Fangzhou (China) Zhang Yuxuan (China) Sun Xuliu
September 11	Batumi Ladies Open; Batumi, Georgia; Hard $25,000; Singles and doubles draws	(Uzbekistan) Nigina Abduraimova; 3–6, 6–4, 6–3	(Russia) Anna Kalinskaya	(Slovakia) Viktória Kužmová (Serbia) Nina Stojanović	(Ukraine) Olga Ianchuk (Russia) Polina Leykina (Russia) Ekaterina Kazionova (Russia) Veronika Kudermetova
September 11	Batumi Ladies Open; Batumi, Georgia; Hard $25,000; Singles and doubles draws	(Belgium) Ysaline Bonaventure (Slovakia) Viktória Kužmová; 6–1, 6–3	(Georgia (country)) Tatia Mikadze (Georgia (country)) Sofia Shapatava	(Slovakia) Viktória Kužmová (Serbia) Nina Stojanović	(Ukraine) Olga Ianchuk (Russia) Polina Leykina (Russia) Ekaterina Kazionova (Russia) Veronika Kudermetova
September 11	Pula, Italy; Clay $25,000; Singles and doubles draws	(Italy) Deborah Chiesa; 7–6^{(7–3)}, 6–3	(Italy) Jessica Pieri	(Italy) Georgia Brescia (Spain) María Teresa Torró Flor	(Venezuela) Andrea Gámiz (Norway) Melanie Stokke (Italy) Federica Di Sarra (Italy) Martina Di Giuseppe
September 11	Pula, Italy; Clay $25,000; Singles and doubles draws	(Venezuela) Andrea Gámiz (Germany) Lisa Ponomar; 5–7, 6–2, [10–6]	(Switzerland) Aline Thommen (Venezuela) Aymet Uzcátegui	(Italy) Georgia Brescia (Spain) María Teresa Torró Flor	(Venezuela) Andrea Gámiz (Norway) Melanie Stokke (Italy) Federica Di Sarra (Italy) Martina Di Giuseppe
September 11	Redding, United States; Hard $25,000; Singles and doubles draws	(United States) Robin Anderson; 6–1, 6–4	(South Africa) Chanel Simmonds	(United Kingdom) Katie Swan (Serbia) Jovana Jakšić	(Montenegro) Ana Veselinović (Poland) Urszula Radwańska (United States) Caitlin Whoriskey (India) Karman Kaur Thandi
September 11	Redding, United States; Hard $25,000; Singles and doubles draws	(United Kingdom) Daneika Borthwick (Montenegro) Ana Veselinović; 6–3, 6–4	(United Kingdom) Harriet Dart (United States) Maria Sanchez	(United Kingdom) Katie Swan (Serbia) Jovana Jakšić	(Montenegro) Ana Veselinović (Poland) Urszula Radwańska (United States) Caitlin Whoriskey (India) Karman Kaur Thandi
September 11	Buenos Aires, Argentina; Clay $15,000; Singles and doubles draws	(Argentina) María Lourdes Carlé; 2–6, 6–2, 7–6^{(7–5)}	(Argentina) Stephanie Mariel Petit	(Chile) Ivania Martinich (Paraguay) Camila Giangreco Campiz	(Brazil) Nathaly Kurata (Argentina) Julieta Lara Estable (United Kingdom) Emily Appleton (Chile) Daniela Macarena López
September 11	Buenos Aires, Argentina; Clay $15,000; Singles and doubles draws	(United Kingdom) Emily Appleton (Argentina) María Lourdes Carlé; 6–3, 6–1	(Argentina) Julieta Lara Estable (Argentina) Melina Ferrero	(Chile) Ivania Martinich (Paraguay) Camila Giangreco Campiz	(Brazil) Nathaly Kurata (Argentina) Julieta Lara Estable (United Kingdom) Emily Appleton (Chile) Daniela Macarena López
September 11	Prague, Czech Republic; Clay $15,000; Singles and doubles draws	(Czech Republic) Miriam Kolodziejová; 6–2, 5–7, 6–4	(Slovenia) Nastja Kolar	(Ukraine) Sofiya Kovalets (Czech Republic) Pernilla Mendesová	(Moldova) Anastasia Dețiuc (Czech Republic) Kateřina Vaňková (Czech Republic) Vendula Žovincová (Czech Republic) Tereza Procházková
September 11	Prague, Czech Republic; Clay $15,000; Singles and doubles draws	(Moldova) Anastasia Dețiuc (Czech Republic) Johana Marková; 6–2, 6–2	(Ukraine) Nadiya Kolb (Germany) Natalie Pröse	(Ukraine) Sofiya Kovalets (Czech Republic) Pernilla Mendesová	(Moldova) Anastasia Dețiuc (Czech Republic) Kateřina Vaňková (Czech Republic) Vendula Žovincová (Czech Republic) Tereza Procházková
September 11	Cairo, Egypt; Clay $15,000; Singles and doubles draws	(Russia) Victoria Kan; 7–5, 6–3	(Spain) Nuria Párrizas Díaz	(Australia) Angelique Svinos (Italy) Martina Colmegna	(Hungary) Naomi Totka (Russia) Anastasia Sukhotina (Egypt) Ola Abou Zekry (France) Emma Léné
September 11	Cairo, Egypt; Clay $15,000; Singles and doubles draws	(Russia) Victoria Kan (Russia) Maria Zotova; 6–3, 6–3	(United States) Akiko Okuda (Dominican Republic) Kelly Williford	(Australia) Angelique Svinos (Italy) Martina Colmegna	(Hungary) Naomi Totka (Russia) Anastasia Sukhotina (Egypt) Ola Abou Zekry (France) Emma Léné
September 11	Székesfehérvár, Hungary; Clay $15,000; Singles and doubles draws	(Hungary) Panna Udvardy; 7–5, 6–3	(Hungary) Réka Luca Jani	(Ukraine) Anastasiya Fedoryshyn (Hungary) Anna Bondár	(Romania) Laura-Ioana Andrei (Hungary) Luca Nagymihály (Croatia) Iva Primorac (Romania) Gabriela Duca
September 11	Székesfehérvár, Hungary; Clay $15,000; Singles and doubles draws	(Romania) Laura-Ioana Andrei (Romania) Elena Bogdan; 1–6, 6–2, [10–7]	(Hungary) Réka Luca Jani (Hungary) Panna Udvardy	(Ukraine) Anastasiya Fedoryshyn (Hungary) Anna Bondár	(Romania) Laura-Ioana Andrei (Hungary) Luca Nagymihály (Croatia) Iva Primorac (Romania) Gabriela Duca
September 11	Hua Hin, Thailand; Hard $15,000; Singles and doubles draws	(India) Rutuja Bhosale; 6–4, 2–6, 7–5	(Chinese Taipei) Lee Hua-chen	(Chinese Taipei) Chan Chin-wei (Switzerland) Lulu Sun	(Serbia) Natalija Kostić (Thailand) Watsachol Sawasdee (India) Sai Samhitha Chamarthi (China) You Mizhuoma
September 11	Hua Hin, Thailand; Hard $15,000; Singles and doubles draws	(India) Zeel Desai (India) Pranjala Yadlapalli; 6–2, 7–5	(India) Rutuja Bhosale (Australia) Alexandra Walters	(Chinese Taipei) Chan Chin-wei (Switzerland) Lulu Sun	(Serbia) Natalija Kostić (Thailand) Watsachol Sawasdee (India) Sai Samhitha Chamarthi (China) You Mizhuoma
September 11	Hammamet, Tunisia; Clay $15,000; Singles and doubles draws	(Algeria) Inès Ibbou; 3–6, 7–6^{(7–4)}, 6–0	(Russia) Varvara Gracheva	(Portugal) Inês Murta (United Kingdom) Francesca Jones	(France) Olympe Lancelot (Argentina) Guadalupe Pérez Rojas (Colombia) María Fernanda Herazo (Argentina) Victoria Bosio
September 11	Hammamet, Tunisia; Clay $15,000; Singles and doubles draws	(Argentina) Victoria Bosio (Colombia) María Fernanda Herazo; 6–4, 6–3	(Belgium) Lara Salden (Belgium) Chelsea Vanhoutte	(Portugal) Inês Murta (United Kingdom) Francesca Jones	(France) Olympe Lancelot (Argentina) Guadalupe Pérez Rojas (Colombia) María Fernanda Herazo (Argentina) Victoria Bosio
September 11	Antalya, Turkey; Clay $15,000; Singles and doubles draws	(Greece) Despina Papamichail; 3–6, 6–2, 7–6^{(8–6)}	(Romania) Raluca Georgiana Șerban	(Brazil) Carolina Alves (Chile) Bárbara Gatica	(Russia) Daria Nazarkina (Bulgaria) Julia Stamatova (Moldova) Adriana Sosnovschi (United States) Dasha Ivanova
September 11	Antalya, Turkey; Clay $15,000; Singles and doubles draws	(Paraguay) Lara Escauriza (Chile) Bárbara Gatica; 7–5, 6–4	(Netherlands) Suzan Lamens (Netherlands) Erika Vogelsang	(Brazil) Carolina Alves (Chile) Bárbara Gatica	(Russia) Daria Nazarkina (Bulgaria) Julia Stamatova (Moldova) Adriana Sosnovschi (United States) Dasha Ivanova
September 18	Abierto Tampico; Tampico, Mexico; Hard $100,000+H; Singles – Doubles	(United States) Irina Falconi; 7–5, 6–7^{(3–7)}, 6–1	(United States) Louisa Chirico	(United States) Jennifer Brady (Spain) Aliona Bolsova Zadoinov	(Mexico) Giuliana Olmos (Mexico) Victoria Rodríguez (United States) Usue Maitane Arconada (United Kingdom) Katie Boulter
September 18	Abierto Tampico; Tampico, Mexico; Hard $100,000+H; Singles – Doubles	(United States) Caroline Dolehide (Argentina) María Irigoyen; 6–4, 6–4	(United States) Kaitlyn Christian (Mexico) Giuliana Olmos	(United States) Jennifer Brady (Spain) Aliona Bolsova Zadoinov	(Mexico) Giuliana Olmos (Mexico) Victoria Rodríguez (United States) Usue Maitane Arconada (United Kingdom) Katie Boulter
September 18	Neva Cup; Saint Petersburg, Russia; Hard (indoor) $100,000; Singles – Doubles	(Switzerland) Belinda Bencic; 6–2, 6–3	(Ukraine) Dayana Yastremska	(Croatia) Donna Vekić (Ukraine) Anhelina Kalinina	(Russia) Valeria Savinykh (Belarus) Aryna Sabalenka (Belgium) Ysaline Bonaventure (Greece) Valentini Grammatikopoulou
September 18	Neva Cup; Saint Petersburg, Russia; Hard (indoor) $100,000; Singles – Doubles	(Russia) Anna Blinkova (Russia) Veronika Kudermetova; 6–3, 6–1	(Switzerland) Belinda Bencic (Slovakia) Michaela Hončová	(Croatia) Donna Vekić (Ukraine) Anhelina Kalinina	(Russia) Valeria Savinykh (Belarus) Aryna Sabalenka (Belgium) Ysaline Bonaventure (Greece) Valentini Grammatikopoulou
September 18	Coleman Vision Tennis Championships; Albuquerque, United States; Hard $80,000; Singles – Doubles	(United States) Emina Bektas; 6–4, 6–2	(United States) Maria Sanchez	(United States) Sophie Chang (France) Shérazad Reix	(United States) Sanaz Marand (Serbia) Jovana Jakšić (United Kingdom) Tara Moore (Bulgaria) Sesil Karatantcheva
September 18	Coleman Vision Tennis Championships; Albuquerque, United States; Hard $80,000; Singles – Doubles	(United Kingdom) Tara Moore (Switzerland) Conny Perrin; 6–3, 6–3	(Switzerland) Viktorija Golubic (Switzerland) Amra Sadiković	(United States) Sophie Chang (France) Shérazad Reix	(United States) Sanaz Marand (Serbia) Jovana Jakšić (United Kingdom) Tara Moore (Bulgaria) Sesil Karatantcheva
September 18	L'Open Emeraude Solaire de Saint-Malo; Saint-Malo, France; Clay $60,000+H; Singles – Doubles	(Slovenia) Polona Hercog; 6–3, 6–3	(Latvia) Diāna Marcinkēviča	(Romania) Alexandra Cadanțu (Russia) Valentyna Ivakhnenko	(Romania) Mihaela Buzărnescu (Chile) Daniela Seguel (Turkey) Çağla Büyükakçay (Belgium) Kimberley Zimmermann
September 18	L'Open Emeraude Solaire de Saint-Malo; Saint-Malo, France; Clay $60,000+H; Singles – Doubles	(Latvia) Diāna Marcinkēviča (Chile) Daniela Seguel; 6–3, 6–3	(Romania) Irina Bara (Romania) Mihaela Buzărnescu	(Romania) Alexandra Cadanțu (Russia) Valentyna Ivakhnenko	(Romania) Mihaela Buzărnescu (Chile) Daniela Seguel (Turkey) Çağla Büyükakçay (Belgium) Kimberley Zimmermann
September 18	Penrith, Australia; Hard $25,000; Singles and doubles draws	(Australia) Olivia Rogowska; 6–2, 6–4	(Australia) Kimberly Birrell	(United States) Asia Muhammad (United States) Lauren Albanese	(Germany) Julia Wachaczyk (Australia) Zoe Hives (Australia) Jaimee Fourlis (Japan) Chihiro Muramatsu
September 18	Penrith, Australia; Hard $25,000; Singles and doubles draws	(Australia) Naiktha Bains (Papua New Guinea) Abigail Tere-Apisah; 6–0, 7–5	(Australia) Tammi Patterson (Australia) Olivia Rogowska	(United States) Asia Muhammad (United States) Lauren Albanese	(Germany) Julia Wachaczyk (Australia) Zoe Hives (Australia) Jaimee Fourlis (Japan) Chihiro Muramatsu
September 18	Pula, Italy; Clay $25,000; Singles and doubles draws	(Venezuela) Andrea Gámiz; 5–7, 7–5, 6–2	(Croatia) Tereza Mrdeža	(Liechtenstein) Kathinka von Deichmann (Italy) Martina Di Giuseppe	(Italy) Jessica Pieri (Belgium) Elyne Boeykens (Italy) Martina Caregaro (Italy) Georgia Brescia
September 18	Pula, Italy; Clay $25,000; Singles and doubles draws	(Italy) Claudia Giovine (Italy) Anastasia Grymalska; 3–6, 7–5, [10–4]	(Italy) Martina Caregaro (Italy) Martina Di Giuseppe	(Liechtenstein) Kathinka von Deichmann (Italy) Martina Di Giuseppe	(Italy) Jessica Pieri (Belgium) Elyne Boeykens (Italy) Martina Caregaro (Italy) Georgia Brescia
September 18	Royal Cup NLB Montenegro; Podgorica, Montenegro; Clay $25,000; Singles and doubles draws	(Russia) Marina Melnikova; 6–2, 6–0	(Czech Republic) Jesika Malečková	(Czech Republic) Petra Krejsová (Serbia) Dejana Radanović	(Slovenia) Tamara Zidanšek (Hungary) Ágnes Bukta (Italy) Giulia Gatto-Monticone (Czech Republic) Monika Kilnarová
September 18	Royal Cup NLB Montenegro; Podgorica, Montenegro; Clay $25,000; Singles and doubles draws	(Czech Republic) Petra Krejsová (Czech Republic) Jesika Malečková; 6–2, 6–3	(Slovakia) Tereza Mihalíková (Slovakia) Chantal Škamlová	(Czech Republic) Petra Krejsová (Serbia) Dejana Radanović	(Slovenia) Tamara Zidanšek (Hungary) Ágnes Bukta (Italy) Giulia Gatto-Monticone (Czech Republic) Monika Kilnarová
September 18	Lubbock, United States; Hard $25,000; Singles and doubles draws	(Russia) Alisa Kleybanova; 6–0, 6–2	(United States) Victoria Duval	(United Kingdom) Harriet Dart (United States) Gabrielle Smith	(Chinese Taipei) Hsu Chieh-yu (United States) Hanna Chang (United States) Rasheeda McAdoo (United States) Robin Anderson
September 18	Lubbock, United States; Hard $25,000; Singles and doubles draws	(United States) Victoria Duval (Russia) Alisa Kleybanova; 2–6, 6–4, [10–8]	(India) Karman Kaur Thandi (Montenegro) Ana Veselinović	(United Kingdom) Harriet Dart (United States) Gabrielle Smith	(Chinese Taipei) Hsu Chieh-yu (United States) Hanna Chang (United States) Rasheeda McAdoo (United States) Robin Anderson
September 18	Varna, Bulgaria; Clay $15,000; Singles and doubles draws	(Romania) Miriam Bianca Bulgaru; 6–0, 7–6^{(7–5)}	(Romania) Cristina Adamescu	(Romania) Gabriela Nicole Tătăruș (Romania) Ioana Gaspar	(Turkey) Hülya Esen (Belgium) Michaela Boev (Bulgaria) Ani Vangelova (Bulgaria) Dia Evtimova
September 18	Varna, Bulgaria; Clay $15,000; Singles and doubles draws	(Belgium) Michaela Boev (Bulgaria) Dia Evtimova; 2–6, 7–6^{(7–5)}, [10–3]	(United Kingdom) Maia Lumsden (Bulgaria) Julia Stamatova	(Romania) Gabriela Nicole Tătăruș (Romania) Ioana Gaspar	(Turkey) Hülya Esen (Belgium) Michaela Boev (Bulgaria) Ani Vangelova (Bulgaria) Dia Evtimova
September 18	Sharm El Sheikh, Egypt; Hard $15,000; Singles and doubles draws	(Chinese Taipei) Lee Pei-chi; 7–6^{(7–3)}, 6–3	(Belgium) Magali Kempen	(Belgium) Britt Geukens (Denmark) Emilie Francati	(Romania) Ana Bianca Mihăilă (United Kingdom) Jodie Anna Burrage (Austria) Melanie Klaffner (France) Caroline Roméo
September 18	Sharm El Sheikh, Egypt; Hard $15,000; Singles and doubles draws	(Chinese Taipei) Chen Pei-hsuan (Chinese Taipei) Wu Fang-hsien; 7–6^{(8–6)}, 3–6, [11–9]	(Chinese Taipei) Hsieh Yu-ting (Chinese Taipei) Lee Pei-chi	(Belgium) Britt Geukens (Denmark) Emilie Francati	(Romania) Ana Bianca Mihăilă (United Kingdom) Jodie Anna Burrage (Austria) Melanie Klaffner (France) Caroline Roméo
September 18	Shymkent, Kazakhstan; Clay $15,000; Singles and doubles draws	(Russia) Daria Lodikova; 6–7^{(5–7)}, 6–3, 6–3	(Russia) Daria Kruzhkova	(Uzbekistan) Albina Khabibulina (Kyrgyzstan) Ksenia Palkina	(Russia) Nonna Kurginyan (Russia) Ulyana Ayzatulina (Russia) Vlada Koval (Russia) Polina Bakhmutkina
September 18	Shymkent, Kazakhstan; Clay $15,000; Singles and doubles draws	(Croatia) Mariana Dražić (Kyrgyzstan) Ksenia Palkina; 7–5, 3–6, [10–8]	(Kazakhstan) Dariya Detkovskaya (Kazakhstan) Zhibek Kulambayeva	(Uzbekistan) Albina Khabibulina (Kyrgyzstan) Ksenia Palkina	(Russia) Nonna Kurginyan (Russia) Ulyana Ayzatulina (Russia) Vlada Koval (Russia) Polina Bakhmutkina
September 18	Madrid, Spain; Hard $15,000; Singles and doubles draws	(Spain) Nuria Párrizas Díaz; 6–4, 4–6, 6–2	(Switzerland) Rebeka Masarova	(Ecuador) Charlotte Römer (Spain) Marina Bassols Ribera	(France) Amandine Cazeaux (France) Julie Gervais (Spain) Rocío de la Torre Sánchez (Switzerland) Tess Sugnaux
September 18	Madrid, Spain; Hard $15,000; Singles and doubles draws	(United Kingdom) Alicia Barnett (United Kingdom) Olivia Nicholls; 6–1, 6–2	(Spain) Marina Bassols Ribera (Spain) Júlia Payola	(Ecuador) Charlotte Römer (Spain) Marina Bassols Ribera	(France) Amandine Cazeaux (France) Julie Gervais (Spain) Rocío de la Torre Sánchez (Switzerland) Tess Sugnaux
September 18	Hua Hin, Thailand; Hard $15,000; Singles and doubles draws	(Chinese Taipei) Lee Hua-chen; 6–2, 6–2	(Belgium) Tamaryn Hendler	(Thailand) Nudnida Luangnam (China) Ren Jiaqi	(Israel) Julia Glushko (China) Wang Xiyu (India) Rutuja Bhosale (China) Kang Jiaqi
September 18	Hua Hin, Thailand; Hard $15,000; Singles and doubles draws	(China) Ni Ma Zhuoma (China) You Mi Zhuoma; 6–4, 6–3	(Serbia) Natalija Kostić (China) Wang Xiyu	(Thailand) Nudnida Luangnam (China) Ren Jiaqi	(Israel) Julia Glushko (China) Wang Xiyu (India) Rutuja Bhosale (China) Kang Jiaqi
September 18	Hammamet, Tunisia; Clay $15,000; Singles and doubles draws	(Colombia) María Fernanda Herazo; 1–6, 7–5, 6–2	(Romania) Irina Fetecău	(Bulgaria) Isabella Shinikova (Germany) Nora Niedmers	(Portugal) Maria João Koehler (Sweden) Marina Yudanov (Algeria) Inès Ibbou (France) Emma Léné
September 18	Hammamet, Tunisia; Clay $15,000; Singles and doubles draws	(Finland) Mia Eklund (United States) Amy Zhu; 6–1, 6–4	(Russia) Vasilisa Aponasenko (Italy) Beatrice Lombardo	(Bulgaria) Isabella Shinikova (Germany) Nora Niedmers	(Portugal) Maria João Koehler (Sweden) Marina Yudanov (Algeria) Inès Ibbou (France) Emma Léné
September 18	Antalya, Turkey; Clay $15,000; Singles and doubles draws	(Sweden) Fanny Östlund; 6–3, 6–1	(Russia) Amina Anshba	(Denmark) Clara Tauson (Chile) Bárbara Gatica	(Germany) Taysiya Morderger (Netherlands) Suzan Lamens (United States) Dasha Ivanova (Brazil) Eduarda Piai
September 18	Antalya, Turkey; Clay $15,000; Singles and doubles draws	(Moldova) Adriana Sosnovschi (Moldova) Vitalia Stamat; 6–3, 5–7, [10–8]	(Romania) Andreea Ghițescu (Turkey) Melis Sezer	(Denmark) Clara Tauson (Chile) Bárbara Gatica	(Germany) Taysiya Morderger (Netherlands) Suzan Lamens (United States) Dasha Ivanova (Brazil) Eduarda Piai
September 18	Bucha, Ukraine; Clay $15,000; Singles and doubles draws	(Italy) Martina Colmegna; 6–3, 6–4	(Ukraine) Yuliya Lysa	(Ukraine) Anastasiya Shoshyna (Italy) Michele Alexandra Zmău	(Ukraine) Nadiya Kolb (Romania) Izabela Gabriela Novac (Ukraine) Veronika Kapshay (Ukraine) Maryna Chernyshova
September 18	Bucha, Ukraine; Clay $15,000; Singles and doubles draws	(Italy) Martina Colmegna (Italy) Michele Alexandra Zmău; 6–4, 6–3	(Ukraine) Maryna Chernyshova (Ukraine) Kateryna Sliusar	(Ukraine) Anastasiya Shoshyna (Italy) Michele Alexandra Zmău	(Ukraine) Nadiya Kolb (Romania) Izabela Gabriela Novac (Ukraine) Veronika Kapshay (Ukraine) Maryna Chernyshova
September 25	Central Coast Pro Tennis Open; Templeton, United States; Hard $60,000; Singles – Doubles	(United States) Sachia Vickery; 6–1, 6–2	(United States) Jamie Loeb	(Switzerland) Viktorija Golubic (United States) Taylor Townsend	(United States) Maria Sanchez (New Zealand) Marina Erakovic (United Kingdom) Laura Robson (Bulgaria) Elitsa Kostova
September 25	Central Coast Pro Tennis Open; Templeton, United States; Hard $60,000; Singles – Doubles	(United States) Kaitlyn Christian (Mexico) Giuliana Olmos; 7–5, 6–3	(Switzerland) Viktorija Golubic (Switzerland) Amra Sadiković	(Switzerland) Viktorija Golubic (United States) Taylor Townsend	(United States) Maria Sanchez (New Zealand) Marina Erakovic (United Kingdom) Laura Robson (Bulgaria) Elitsa Kostova
September 25	Brisbane, Australia; Hard $25,000; Singles and doubles draws	(Australia) Kimberly Birrell; 4–6, 6–3, 6–2	(United States) Asia Muhammad	(Australia) Sara Tomic (Australia) Olivia Rogowska	(Australia) Olivia Tjandramulia (Australia) Storm Sanders (Australia) Jaimee Fourlis (Australia) Zoe Hives
September 25	Brisbane, Australia; Hard $25,000; Singles and doubles draws	(Australia) Naiktha Bains (Papua New Guinea) Abigail Tere-Apisah; 6–4, 6–1	(United States) Jennifer Elie (Japan) Erika Sema	(Australia) Sara Tomic (Australia) Olivia Rogowska	(Australia) Olivia Tjandramulia (Australia) Storm Sanders (Australia) Jaimee Fourlis (Australia) Zoe Hives
September 25	Clermont-Ferrand, France; Hard (indoor) $25,000; Singles and doubles draws	(Belarus) Vera Lapko; 6–4, 6–4	(Netherlands) Bibiane Schoofs	(France) Manon Arcangioli (Switzerland) Belinda Bencic	(France) Elixane Lechemia (Latvia) Diāna Marcinkēviča (France) Jessika Ponchet (Hungary) Dalma Gálfi
September 25	Clermont-Ferrand, France; Hard (indoor) $25,000; Singles and doubles draws	(Belarus) Vera Lapko (Sweden) Cornelia Lister; 6–4, 6–3	(United Kingdom) Sarah Beth Grey (United Kingdom) Olivia Nicholls	(France) Manon Arcangioli (Switzerland) Belinda Bencic	(France) Elixane Lechemia (Latvia) Diāna Marcinkēviča (France) Jessika Ponchet (Hungary) Dalma Gálfi
September 25	Pula, Italy; Clay $25,000; Singles and doubles draws	(Slovenia) Tamara Zidanšek; 7–6^{(7–4)}, 7–5	(Croatia) Tereza Mrdeža	(Slovenia) Polona Hercog (Argentina) Catalina Pella	(United Kingdom) Amanda Carreras (Serbia) Dejana Radanović (Liechtenstein) Kathinka von Deichmann (Italy) Martina Di Giuseppe
September 25	Pula, Italy; Clay $25,000; Singles and doubles draws	(Italy) Claudia Giovine (Croatia) Tereza Mrdeža; 6–3, 6–1	(Brazil) Gabriela Cé (Argentina) Catalina Pella	(Slovenia) Polona Hercog (Argentina) Catalina Pella	(United Kingdom) Amanda Carreras (Serbia) Dejana Radanović (Liechtenstein) Kathinka von Deichmann (Italy) Martina Di Giuseppe
September 25	Hua Hin, Thailand; Hard $25,000; Singles and doubles draws	(Netherlands) Arantxa Rus; 6–1, 6–3	(United States) Jacqueline Cako	(Belgium) Tamaryn Hendler (India) Pranjala Yadlapalli	(Thailand) Peangtarn Plipuech (China) Yuan Yue (Turkey) Pemra Özgen (Israel) Julia Glushko
September 25	Hua Hin, Thailand; Hard $25,000; Singles and doubles draws	(South Korea) Kim Na-ri (Russia) Anastasia Pivovarova; 6–4, 6–2	(Serbia) Natalija Kostić (Japan) Michika Ozeki	(Belgium) Tamaryn Hendler (India) Pranjala Yadlapalli	(Thailand) Peangtarn Plipuech (China) Yuan Yue (Turkey) Pemra Özgen (Israel) Julia Glushko
September 25	Stillwater, United States; Hard $25,000; Singles and doubles draws	(Canada) Aleksandra Wozniak; 7–5, 6–4	(Czech Republic) Marie Bouzková	(United States) Usue Maitane Arconada (Mexico) Ana Sofía Sánchez	(United States) Danielle Collins (Switzerland) Conny Perrin (United States) Julia Elbaba (India) Karman Kaur Thandi
September 25	Stillwater, United States; Hard $25,000; Singles and doubles draws	(Serbia) Jovana Jakšić (United States) Caitlin Whoriskey; 4–6, 6–4, [10–3]	(United Kingdom) Harriet Dart (Belgium) An-Sophie Mestach	(United States) Usue Maitane Arconada (Mexico) Ana Sofía Sánchez	(United States) Danielle Collins (Switzerland) Conny Perrin (United States) Julia Elbaba (India) Karman Kaur Thandi
September 25	Brno, Czech Republic; Clay $15,000; Singles and doubles draws	(Czech Republic) Diana Šumová; 6–1, 6–2	(Czech Republic) Johana Marková	(Czech Republic) Aneta Kladivová (Croatia) Iva Primorac	(Czech Republic) Vendula Žovincová (Czech Republic) Gabriela Pantůčková (Slovakia) Tereza Mihalíková (Slovenia) Nina Potočnik
September 25	Brno, Czech Republic; Clay $15,000; Singles and doubles draws	(Slovakia) Jana Jablonovská (Slovakia) Natália Vajdová; 6–4, 6–4	(Czech Republic) Aneta Kladivová (Czech Republic) Vendula Žovincová	(Czech Republic) Aneta Kladivová (Croatia) Iva Primorac	(Czech Republic) Vendula Žovincová (Czech Republic) Gabriela Pantůčková (Slovakia) Tereza Mihalíková (Slovenia) Nina Potočnik
September 25	Sharm El Sheikh, Egypt; Hard $15,000; Singles and doubles draws	(Belgium) Magali Kempen; 6–7^{(4–7)}, 7–6^{(7–5)}, 6–4	(Chinese Taipei) Lee Pei-chi	(United Kingdom) Jodie Anna Burrage (India) Kanika Vaidya	(Belgium) Britt Geukens (France) Caroline Roméo (Denmark) Emilie Francati (Serbia) Barbara Bonić
September 25	Sharm El Sheikh, Egypt; Hard $15,000; Singles and doubles draws	(Chinese Taipei) Chen Pei-hsuan (Chinese Taipei) Wu Fang-hsien; 6–0, 1–6, [10–7]	(Chinese Taipei) Lee Pei-chi (India) Kanika Vaidya	(United Kingdom) Jodie Anna Burrage (India) Kanika Vaidya	(Belgium) Britt Geukens (France) Caroline Roméo (Denmark) Emilie Francati (Serbia) Barbara Bonić
September 25	Shymkent, Kazakhstan; Clay $15,000; Singles and doubles draws	(Russia) Polina Bakhmutkina; 3–6, 6–0, 6–4	(Russia) Ulyana Ayzatulina	(Russia) Margarita Lazareva (Kazakhstan) Zhibek Kulambayeva	(Croatia) Mariana Dražić (Kyrgyzstan) Ksenia Palkina (Russia) Vlada Koval (Russia) Nonna Kurginyan
September 25	Shymkent, Kazakhstan; Clay $15,000; Singles and doubles draws	(Croatia) Mariana Dražić (Kyrgyzstan) Ksenia Palkina; 7–5, 6–2	(Kazakhstan) Dariya Detkovskaya (Kazakhstan) Zhibek Kulambayeva	(Russia) Margarita Lazareva (Kazakhstan) Zhibek Kulambayeva	(Croatia) Mariana Dražić (Kyrgyzstan) Ksenia Palkina (Russia) Vlada Koval (Russia) Nonna Kurginyan
September 25	Jounieh, Lebanon; Clay $15,000; Singles and doubles draws	(France) Clothilde de Bernardi; 6–0, 6–4	(Turkey) Berfu Cengiz	(Sweden) Fanny Östlund (Serbia) Bojana Marinković	(Sweden) Jacqueline Cabaj Awad (Hungary) Naomi Totka (Russia) Victoria Kan (Russia) Vasilisa Aponasenko
September 25	Jounieh, Lebanon; Clay $15,000; Singles and doubles draws	(Egypt) Ola Abou Zekry (Turkey) Berfu Cengiz; 6–4, 7–5	(Sweden) Jacqueline Cabaj Awad (Sweden) Fanny Östlund	(Sweden) Fanny Östlund (Serbia) Bojana Marinković	(Sweden) Jacqueline Cabaj Awad (Hungary) Naomi Totka (Russia) Victoria Kan (Russia) Vasilisa Aponasenko
September 25	Melilla, Spain; Clay $15,000; Singles and doubles draws	(Spain) Eva Guerrero Álvarez; 6–4, 6–0	(Spain) Marina Bassols Ribera	(Greece) Despina Papamichail (Spain) Paula Arias Manjón	(Spain) Lucía Marzal Martínez (Spain) Ángela Fita Boluda (Spain) María José Luque Moreno (Italy) Verena Meliss
September 25	Melilla, Spain; Clay $15,000; Singles and doubles draws	(Spain) Paula Arias Manjón (Spain) Eva Guerrero Álvarez; 4–6, 6–4, [10–3]	(Spain) Noelia Bouzó Zanotti (Spain) Ángela Fita Boluda	(Greece) Despina Papamichail (Spain) Paula Arias Manjón	(Spain) Lucía Marzal Martínez (Spain) Ángela Fita Boluda (Spain) María José Luque Moreno (Italy) Verena Meliss
September 25	Hammamet, Tunisia; Clay $15,000; Singles and doubles draws	(France) Marie Témin; 6–4, 6–0	(Bulgaria) Isabella Shinikova	(Sweden) Marina Yudanov (Colombia) María Fernanda Herazo	(Japan) Satsuki Takamura (Italy) Dalila Spiteri (Italy) Gaia Sanesi (Belgium) Marie Benoît
September 25	Hammamet, Tunisia; Clay $15,000; Singles and doubles draws	(Italy) Angelica Moratelli (Italy) Natasha Piludu; 6–4, 6–2	(Finland) Mia Eklund (United States) Amy Zhu	(Sweden) Marina Yudanov (Colombia) María Fernanda Herazo	(Japan) Satsuki Takamura (Italy) Dalila Spiteri (Italy) Gaia Sanesi (Belgium) Marie Benoît
September 25	Antalya, Turkey; Clay $15,000; Singles and doubles draws	(Poland) Marta Leśniak; 6–3, 6–1	(Russia) Amina Anshba	(Chile) Bárbara Gatica (Brazil) Carolina Alves	(Germany) Tayisiya Morderger (United States) Dasha Ivanova (Turkey) Melis Sezer (Romania) Georgia Crăciun
September 25	Antalya, Turkey; Clay $15,000; Singles and doubles draws	(Romania) Georgia Crăciun (Romania) Andreea Ghițescu; 6–2, 6–2	(Russia) Amina Anshba (Turkey) Melis Sezer	(Chile) Bárbara Gatica (Brazil) Carolina Alves	(Germany) Tayisiya Morderger (United States) Dasha Ivanova (Turkey) Melis Sezer (Romania) Georgia Crăciun
September 25	Kyiv, Ukraine; Clay $15,000; Singles and doubles draws	(Belarus) Sviatlana Pirazhenka; 6–4, 6–4	(Ukraine) Olga Ianchuk	(Ukraine) Anastasiya Shoshyna (Israel) Vlada Ekshibarova	(Belarus) Nika Shytkouskaya (Ukraine) Maryna Chernyshova (Ukraine) Kateryna Sliusar (Belarus) Shalimar Talbi
September 25	Kyiv, Ukraine; Clay $15,000; Singles and doubles draws	(Ukraine) Maryna Kolb (Ukraine) Nadiya Kolb; 6–2, 4–6, [13–11]	(Italy) Martina Colmegna (Italy) Michele Alexandra Zmău	(Ukraine) Anastasiya Shoshyna (Israel) Vlada Ekshibarova	(Belarus) Nika Shytkouskaya (Ukraine) Maryna Chernyshova (Ukraine) Kateryna Sliusar (Belarus) Shalimar Talbi
September 25	Charleston, United States; Clay $15,000; Singles and doubles draws	(Czech Republic) Michaela Bayerlová; 2–6, 6–3, 6–3	(Paraguay) Montserrat González	(United States) Anastasia Nefedova (Italy) Anna Turati	(Brazil) Thaisa Grana Pedretti (United States) Emma Navarro (United States) Amanda Rodgers (Brazil) Laura Pigossi
September 25	Charleston, United States; Clay $15,000; Singles and doubles draws	(United States) Chloe Beck (United States) Emma Navarro; 6–1, 6–4	(Russia) Ksenia Kuznetsova (Spain) María Martínez Martínez	(United States) Anastasia Nefedova (Italy) Anna Turati	(Brazil) Thaisa Grana Pedretti (United States) Emma Navarro (United States) Amanda Rodgers (Brazil) Laura Pigossi
