= Csaba Dióssi =

Hungarian politician

Member of the National Assembly
- In office 14 May 2010 – 5 May 2014

Personal details
- Born: 11 November 1969 (age 56) Budapest, Hungary
- Party: Fidesz
- Profession: politician

Csaba Dióssi (born 11 November 1969) is a Hungarian politician, member of the National Assembly (MP) for Dunakeszi (Pest County Constituency III) between 2010 and 2014. He was a member of the Economic and Information Technology Committee from 14 May 2010 to 5 May 2014.

Dióssi is the current mayor of Dunakeszi since 2010. Previously he served as deputy mayor between 2007 and 2010.
