= Dunakeszi =

Town in Pest, Hungary

- Town
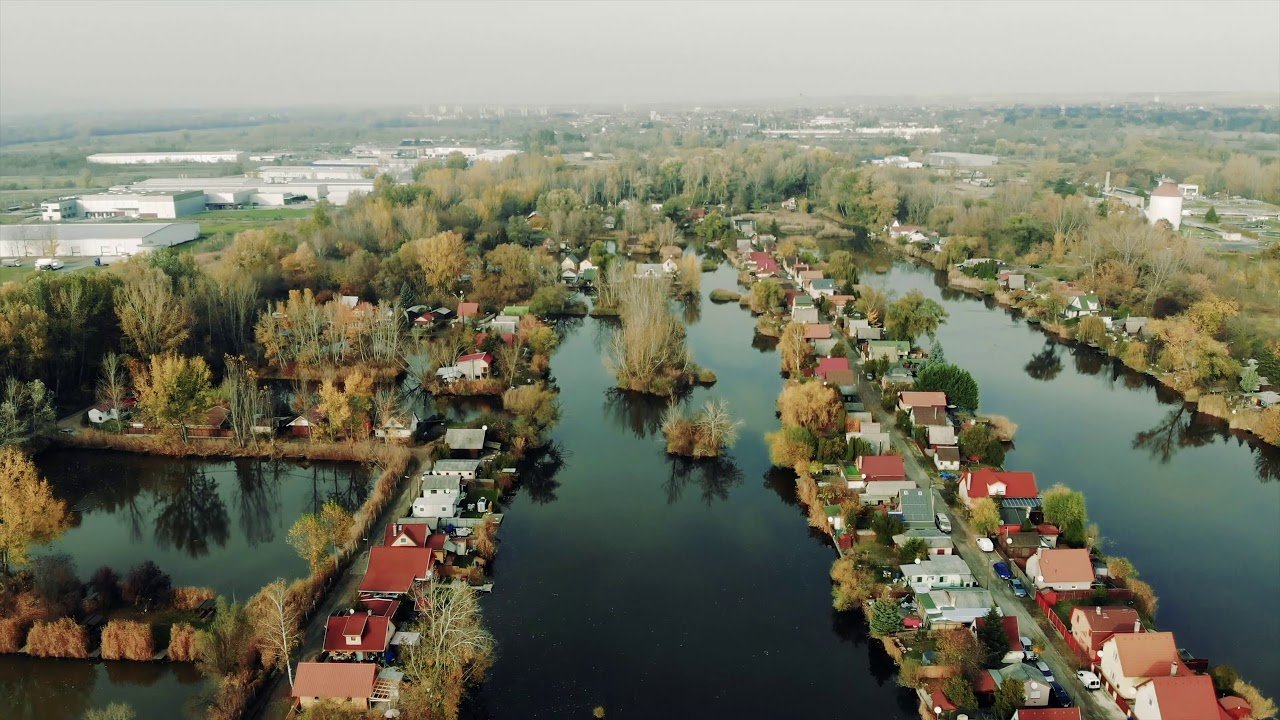
- Dunakeszi from above

- Coat of arms

- Location of Dunakeszi within Hungary Dunakeszi (Europe)
- Coordinates: 47.63030°N 19.14123°E
- Country: Hungary
- County: Pest
- District: Dunakeszi

Area
  - Total: 31.06 km^{2} (11.99 sq mi)

Population (2018 January 1)
  - Total: 43,490
  - Density: 1,400.19/km^{2} (3,626.5/sq mi)
- Time zone: UTC+1 (CET)
  - Summer (DST): UTC+2 (CEST)
- Postal code: 2120
- Area code: (+36) 27
- Website: www.dunakeszi.hu

Dunakeszi (Hungarian: [ˈdunɒkɛsi]) is a city in Pest County, Budapest metropolitan area, Hungary. It is located to the north of Budapest on the left bank of the Danube.

== Politics ==
The current mayor of Dunakeszi is Csaba Dióssi (Fidesz-KDNP).

The local Municipal Assembly, elected at the 2019 local government elections, is made up of 18 members (1 Mayor, 12 Individual constituencies MEPs and 5 Compensation List MEPs) divided into this political parties and alliances:

Party	Seats	Current Municipal Assembly
Fidesz-KDNP	9	M
Opposition coalition (Note: Coalition of DK-Jobbik-LMP-Mindenki Magyarországa-Momentum-MSZP-Dialogue.)	5	
Independent	1	

== Twin towns – sister cities ==
Dunakeszi is twinned with:

- Casalgrande, Italy
- Cristuru Secuiesc, Romania
- Ravda (Nesebar), Bulgaria
- Stary Sącz, Poland

== Sports team ==
- Dunakeszi VSE
