= 2016 Sport11 Ladies Open =

- Date: 5–11 September
- Edition: 1st
- Category: ITF Women's Circuit
- Prize money: $50,000
- Surface: Clay
- Location: Budapest, Hungary

Champions

Singles
- (Russia) Irina Khromacheva

Doubles
- (Netherlands) Cindy Burger / (Netherlands) Arantxa Rus
Sport11 Ladies Open	· 2017 →

The 2016 Sport11 Ladies Open was a professional tennis tournament played on outdoor clay courts. It was the 1st edition of the tournament and part of the 2016 ITF Women's Circuit, offering a total of $50,000 in prize money. It took place in Budapest, Hungary, on 5–11 September 2016.

== Singles main draw entrants ==
=== Seeds ===
Country	Player	Rank^{1}	Seed
CRO	Donna Vekić	106	1
RUS	Irina Khromacheva	118	2
ESP	Sílvia Soler Espinosa	129	3
BRA	Teliana Pereira	136	4
SRB	Ivana Jorović	144	5
NED	Cindy Burger	147	6
SVK	Rebecca Šramková	157	7
SLO	Dalila Jakupović	164	8

- ^{1} Rankings as of 29 August 2016.

=== Other entrants ===
The following player received a wildcard into the singles main draw:

- (Hungary) Vanda Lukács
- (Hungary) Luca Nagymihály
- (Romania) Elena Gabriela Ruse
- (Switzerland) Patty Schnyder

The following players received entry from the qualifying draw:

- (Hungary) Ágnes Bukta
- (Poland) Magdalena Fręch
- (Slovakia) Michaela Hončová
- (Czech Republic) Gabriela Pantůčková

== Champions ==
=== Singles ===
- (Russia) Irina Khromacheva def. (Netherlands) Cindy Burger, 6–1, 6–2

=== Doubles ===
- (Netherlands) Cindy Burger / (Netherlands) Arantxa Rus def. (Hungary) Ágnes Bukta / (Czech Republic) Jesika Malečková, 6–1, 6–4
