= 2018 Hungarian Pro Circuit Ladies Open =

- Date: 9–15 July
- Edition: 3rd
- Category: ITF Women's Circuit
- Prize money: $100,000
- Surface: Clay
- Location: Budapest, Hungary

Champions

Singles
- (Slovakia) Viktória Kužmová

Doubles
- (Romania) Alexandra Cadanțu / (Slovakia) Chantal Škamlová
← 2017 ·	Hungarian Pro Circuit Ladies Open	· 2022 →

The 2018 Hungarian Pro Circuit Ladies Open was a professional tennis tournament played on outdoor clay courts. It was the third edition of the tournament and was part of the 2018 ITF Women's Circuit. It took place in Budapest, Hungary, on 9–15 July 2018.

== Singles main draw entrants ==
=== Seeds ===
Country	Player	Rank^{1}	Seed
SVK	Viktória Kužmová	69	1
CHN	Wang Yafan	84	2
SVK	Anna Karolína Schmiedlová	89	3
SLO	Dalila Jakupović	92	4
SLO	Tamara Zidanšek	94	5
COL	Mariana Duque Mariño	96	6
CZE	Markéta Vondroušová	106	7
RUS	Ekaterina Alexandrova	110	8

- ^{1} Rankings as of 2 July 2018.

=== Other entrants ===
The following players received a wildcard into the singles main draw:

- (Hungary) Anna Bondár
- (Hungary) Ágnes Bukta
- (Hungary) Dalma Gálfi
- (Hungary) Réka Luca Jani

The following players received entry from the qualifying draw:

- (Romania) Nicoleta Dascălu
- (Russia) Alena Fomina
- (Czech Republic) Magdaléna Pantůčková
- (Hungary) Panna Udvardy

The following player received entry as a lucky loser:

- (Russia) Alexandra Panova

== Champions ==
=== Singles ===
- (Slovakia) Viktória Kužmová def. (Russia) Ekaterina Alexandrova, 6–3, 4–6, 6–1

=== Doubles ===
- (Romania) Alexandra Cadanțu / (Slovakia) Chantal Škamlová def. (United States) Kaitlyn Christian / (Mexico) Giuliana Olmos, 6–1, 6–3
