= 2015 Nana Trophy =

- Date: 4–10 May
- Edition: 4th
- Category: ITF Women's Circuit
- Prize money: $50,000
- Surface: Clay
- Location: Tunis, Tunisia

Champions

Singles
- (Argentina) María Irigoyen

Doubles
- (Argentina) María Irigoyen / (Poland) Paula Kania
← 2014 ·	Nana Trophy	· 2016 →

The 2015 Nana Trophy was a professional tennis tournament played on outdoor clay courts. It was the fourth edition of the tournament and part of the 2015 ITF Women's Circuit, offering a total of $50,000 in prize money. It took place in Tunis, Tunisia, on 4–10 May 2015.

== Singles main draw entrants ==
=== Seeds ===
Country	Player	Rank^{1}	Seed
TUN	Ons Jabeur	119	1
POL	Paula Kania	163	2
LUX	Mandy Minella	174	3
JPN	Risa Ozaki	177	4
FRA	Stéphanie Foretz	188	5
BUL	Elitsa Kostova	190	6
USA	Alexa Glatch	194	7
PER	Bianca Botto	200	8

- ^{1} Rankings as of 27 April 2015

=== Other entrants ===
The following players received wildcards into the singles main draw:

- (Bulgaria) Petia Arshinkova
- (Tunisia) Cyrine Ben Cheikh
- (Turkey) Başak Eraydın
- (Russia) Valeria Savinykh

The following players received entry from the qualifying draw:

- (United States) Jan Abaza
- (France) Manon Arcangioli
- (Switzerland) Conny Perrin
- (Italy) Alice Savoretti

== Champions ==
=== Singles ===
- (Argentina) María Irigoyen def. (Netherlands) Cindy Burger, 6–2, 7–5

=== Doubles ===
- (Argentina) María Irigoyen / (Poland) Paula Kania def. (France) Julie Coin / (France) Stéphanie Foretz, 6–1, 6–3
