= 2017 Sport11 Ladies Open – Doubles =

Doubles
- 2017 Sport11 Ladies Open

Final
- Champion: (Colombia) Mariana Duque (Argentina) María Irigoyen
- Runner-up: (Serbia) Aleksandra Krunić (Serbia) Nina Stojanović
- Score: 7–6^{(7–3)}, 7–5

Events
Singles	Doubles
← 2016 ·	Sport11 Ladies Open	· 2018 →

Cindy Burger and Arantxa Rus were the defending champions, but both players chose not to participate.

Mariana Duque and María Irigoyen won the title, defeating Aleksandra Krunić and Nina Stojanović in the final, 7–6^{(7–3)}, 7–5.

== Seeds ==
1. (Serbia) Aleksandra Krunić / (Serbia) Nina Stojanović (final)
2. (Colombia) Mariana Duque / (Argentina) María Irigoyen (champions)
3. (Russia) Irina Khromacheva / (Belgium) Maryna Zanevska (quarterfinals)
4. (Slovakia) Chantal Škamlová / (Thailand) Varatchaya Wongteanchai (semifinals)

== Draw ==
=== Key ===
- Q = Qualifier
- WC = Wild card
- LL = Lucky loser
- Alt = Alternate
- SE = Special exempt
- PR = Protected ranking
- ITF = ITF entry
- JE = Junior exempt
- w/o = Walkover
- r = Retired
- d = Defaulted
- SR = Special ranking

First round
1	(Serbia) A Krunić (Serbia) N Stojanović	6	6
(Turkey) A Aksu (Hungary) Á Bukta	3	2
WC	(Slovakia) J Jablonovská (Slovakia) B Palcátová	2	1^{r}
(Czech Republic) T Martincová (Hungary) P Udvardy	6	5
4	(Slovakia) C Škamlová (Thailand) V Wongteanchai	6	6
(Hungary) D Gálfi (Slovenia) D Jakupović	3	2
(Romania) E Bogdan (Romania) A Cadanțu	5	3
(Ukraine) V Kapshay (Russia) A Pribylova	7	6
(Spain) G García Pérez (Hungary) F Stollár	6	6
(Poland) K Kawa (Argentina) N Podoroska	4	2
(Germany) N Geuer (Germany) A Zaja	4	2
3	(Russia) I Khromacheva (Belgium) M Zanevska	6	6
(Serbia) J Jakšić (Argentina) C Pella	6	6
WC	(Hungary) R Fárbás (Hungary) A Zsitvay	2	1
WC	(Hungary) A Horváth (Hungary) R Szalai	2	0
2	(Colombia) M Duque (Argentina) M Irigoyen	6	6

Quarterfinals
1	(Serbia) A Krunić (Serbia) N Stojanović	5	6	[10]
(Czech Republic) T Martincová (Hungary) P Udvardy	7	3	[5]
4	(Slovakia) C Škamlová (Thailand) V Wongteanchai	7	4	[10]
(Ukraine) V Kapshay (Russia) A Pribylova	5	6	[5]
(Spain) G García Pérez (Hungary) F Stollár	6	6
3	(Russia) I Khromacheva (Belgium) M Zanevska	3	2
(Serbia) J Jakšić (Argentina) C Pella	2	3
2	(Colombia) M Duque (Argentina) M Irigoyen	6	6

Semifinals
1	(Serbia) A Krunić (Serbia) N Stojanović	6^{4}	6	[10]
4	(Slovakia) C Škamlová (Thailand) V Wongteanchai	7^{7}	4	[6]
(Spain) G García Pérez (Hungary) F Stollár	7	4	[6]
2	(Colombia) M Duque (Argentina) M Irigoyen	5	6	[10]

Final
1	(Serbia) A Krunić (Serbia) N Stojanović	6^{3}	5
2	(Colombia) M Duque (Argentina) M Irigoyen	7^{7}	7
