= 2017 Sport11 Ladies Open =

- Date: 10–16 July
- Edition: 2nd
- Category: ITF Women's Circuit
- Prize money: $100,000
- Surface: Clay
- Location: Budapest, Hungary

Champions

Singles
- (Slovakia) Jana Čepelová

Doubles
- (Colombia) Mariana Duque / (Argentina) María Irigoyen
← 2016 ·	Sport11 Ladies Open	· 2018 →

The 2017 Sport11 Ladies Open was a professional tennis tournament played on outdoor clay courts. It was the second edition of the tournament and was part of the 2017 ITF Women's Circuit. It took place in Budapest, Hungary, on 10–16 July 2017.

== Singles main draw entrants ==
=== Seeds ===
Country	Player	Rank^{1}	Seed
USA	Christina McHale	60	1
ROU	Irina-Camelia Begu	64	2
CHN	Zheng Saisai	71	3
SVK	Jana Čepelová	91	4
RUS	Irina Khromacheva	110	5
BEL	Maryna Zanevska	119	6
~~ROU~~	~~Patricia Maria Țig~~	~~120~~	~~7~~
COL	Mariana Duque	121	8

- ^{1} Rankings as of 3 July 2017.

=== Other entrants ===
The following players received a wildcard into the singles main draw:

- (Hungary) Ágnes Bukta
- (Spain) Georgina García Pérez
- (Croatia) Tena Lukas
- (Hungary) Panna Udvardy

The following player received entry by using a protected ranking:

- (United States) Alexa Glatch

The following players received entry from the qualifying draw:

- (Argentina) Catalina Pella
- (Slovenia) Nina Potočnik
- (Norway) Melanie Stokke
- (Germany) Anna Zaja

The following player received entry as a lucky loser:

- (Slovakia) Chantal Škamlová

== Champions ==
=== Singles ===
- (Slovakia) Jana Čepelová def. (Montenegro) Danka Kovinić, 6–4, 6–3

=== Doubles ===
- (Colombia) Mariana Duque / (Argentina) María Irigoyen def. (Serbia) Aleksandra Krunić / (Serbia) Nina Stojanović, 7–6^{(7–3)}, 7–5
