= 2017 Sport11 Ladies Open – Singles =

Singles
- 2017 Sport11 Ladies Open

Final
- Champion: (Slovakia) Jana Čepelová
- Runner-up: (Montenegro) Danka Kovinić
- Score: 6–4, 6–3

Events
Singles	Doubles
← 2016 ·	Sport11 Ladies Open	· 2018 →

Irina Khromacheva was the defending champion, but lost in the quarterfinals to Jana Čepelová.

Čepelová won the title, defeating Danka Kovinić in the final, 6–4, 6–3.

== Seeds ==
1. (United States) Christina McHale (first round)
2. (Romania) Irina-Camelia Begu (first round)
3. (China) Zheng Saisai (first round; retired)
4. (Slovakia) Jana Čepelová (champion)
5. (Russia) Irina Khromacheva (quarterfinals)
6. (Belgium) Maryna Zanevska (first round)
7. (Romania) Patricia Maria Țig (withdrew)
8. (Colombia) Mariana Duque (quarterfinals)

== Draw ==
=== Key ===
- Q = Qualifier
- WC = Wild card
- LL = Lucky loser
- Alt = Alternate
- SE = Special exempt
- PR = Protected ranking
- ITF = ITF entry
- JE = Junior exempt
- w/o = Walkover
- r = Retired
- d = Defaulted
- SR = Special ranking

=== Finals ===
Semifinals
(Montenegro) Danka Kovinić	6	6^{3}	6
(Bulgaria) Viktoriya Tomova	4	7^{7}	3
4	(Slovakia) Jana Čepelová	6	6
(Ukraine) Kateryna Kozlova	4	0

Final
(Montenegro) Danka Kovinić	4	3
4	(Slovakia) Jana Čepelová	6	6

=== Top half ===
First round
1	(United States) C McHale	6	6^{6}	1
(Montenegro) D Kovinić	4	7^{8}	6
WC	(Hungary) Á Bukta	1	2
(Romania) A Cadanțu	6	6
(Serbia) J Jakšić	6	5	2
(Czech Republic) T Martincová	4	7	6
Q	(Slovenia) N Potočnik	2	0
8	(Colombia) M Duque	6	6
3	(China) S Zheng	0^{r}
(Argentina) N Podoroska	3
(Hungary) F Stollár	1	3
LL	(Slovakia) C Škamlová	6	6
WC	(Croatia) T Lukas	6^{5}	3
(Bulgaria) V Tomova	7^{7}	6
(Slovakia) AK Schmiedlová	7^{8}	6
Q	(Germany) A Zaja	6^{6}	4

Second round
(Montenegro) D Kovinić	6	6
(Romania) A Cadanțu	0	3
(Czech Republic) T Martincová	6	1	1
8	(Colombia) M Duque	0	6	6
(Argentina) N Podoroska	6	1	3
LL	(Slovakia) C Škamlová	2	6	6
(Bulgaria) V Tomova	3	6	6
(Slovakia) AK Schmiedlová	6	4	1

Quarterfinals
(Montenegro) D Kovinić	6	2	6
8	(Colombia) M Duque	3	6	2
LL	(Slovakia) C Škamlová	2	4
(Bulgaria) V Tomova	6	6

Semifinals
(Montenegro) D Kovinić	6	6^{3}	6
(Bulgaria) V Tomova	4	7^{7}	3

=== Bottom half ===
First round
5	(Russia) I Khromacheva	6	6
PR	(United States) A Glatch	4	4
(Slovenia) D Jakupović	6	3	6
WC	(Spain) G García Pérez	1	6	2
(Bulgaria) S Karatantcheva	7^{7}	4	6
Q	(Argentina) C Pella	6^{5}	6	4
WC	(Hungary) P Udvardy	3	2
4	(Slovakia) J Čepelová	6	6
6	(Belgium) M Zanevska	6	3	1
Q	(Norway) M Stokke	0	6	6
(Ukraine) K Kozlova	6^{3}	6	6
(Hungary) D Gálfi	7^{7}	2	3
(Turkey) Ç Büyükakçay	6	6
(Serbia) N Stojanović	3	4
(Slovakia) V Kužmová	6	7
2	(Romania) I-C Begu	2	5

Second round
5	(Russia) I Khromacheva	6	2	7^{8}
(Slovenia) D Jakupović	3	6	6^{6}
(Bulgaria) S Karatantcheva	2	1
4	(Slovakia) J Čepelová	6	6
Q	(Norway) M Stokke	5	5
(Ukraine) K Kozlova	7	7
(Turkey) Ç Büyükakçay	7^{7}	7
(Slovakia) V Kužmová	6^{5}	5

Quarterfinals
5	(Russia) I Khromacheva	0	2
4	(Slovakia) J Čepelová	6	6
(Ukraine) K Kozlova	7	3	6
(Turkey) Ç Büyükakçay	5	6	2

Semifinals
4	(Slovakia) J Čepelová	6	6
(Ukraine) K Kozlova	4	0
