= 2016 Sport11 Ladies Open – Singles =

Singles
- 2016 Sport11 Ladies Open

Final
- Champion: (Russia) Irina Khromacheva
- Runner-up: (Netherlands) Cindy Burger
- Score: 6–1, 6–2

Events
Singles	Doubles
Sport11 Ladies Open	· 2017 →

This is a new event in the ITF Women's Circuit.

Irina Khromacheva won the title, defeating Cindy Burger 6–1, 6–2 in the final.

== Seeds ==
1. (Croatia) Donna Vekić (second round)
2. (Russia) Irina Khromacheva (champion)
3. (Spain) Sílvia Soler Espinosa (second round)
4. (Brazil) Teliana Pereira (first round)
5. (Serbia) Ivana Jorović (first round)
6. (Netherlands) Cindy Burger (final)
7. (Slovakia) Rebecca Šramková (second round)
8. (Slovenia) Dalila Jakupović (quarterfinals)

== Main draw ==
=== Key ===
- Q = Qualifier
- WC = Wild card
- LL = Lucky loser
- Alt = Alternate
- SE = Special exempt
- PR = Protected ranking
- ITF = ITF entry
- JE = Junior exempt
- w/o = Walkover
- r = Retired
- d = Defaulted
- SR = Special ranking

=== Finals ===
Semifinals
(Chile) Daniela Seguel	3	0
6	(Netherlands) Cindy Burger	6	6
(Romania) Alexandra Cadanțu	2	2
2	(Russia) Irina Khromacheva	6	6

Final
6	(Netherlands) Cindy Burger	1	2
2	(Russia) Irina Khromacheva	6	6

=== Top half ===
First round
1	(Croatia) D Vekić	6	7
Q	(Hungary) Á Bukta	4	5
(Chile) D Seguel	6	6
(Netherlands) L Kerkhove	1	2
WC	(Hungary) V Lukács	1	0^{r}
WC	(Switzerland) P Schnyder	6	4
(Czech Republic) J Malečková	4	2
7	(Slovakia) R Šramková	6	6
3	(Spain) S Soler Espinosa	6	6
(Czech Republic) T Smitková	0	1
(Netherlands) A Rus	1	6	1
Q	(Slovakia) M Hončová	6	1	6
Q	(Poland) M Fręch	6	1	6
Q	(Czech Republic) G Pantůčková	2	6	3
WC	(Romania) EG Ruse	4	4
6	(Netherlands) C Burger	6	6

Second round
1	(Croatia) D Vekić	6^{8}	5
(Chile) D Seguel	7^{10}	7
WC	(Switzerland) P Schnyder	6	6
7	(Slovakia) R Šramková	2	1
3	(Spain) S Soler Espinosa	6^{4}	1
Q	(Slovakia) M Hončová	7^{7}	6
Q	(Poland) M Fręch	6	3	4
6	(Netherlands) C Burger	2	6	6

Quarterfinals
(Chile) D Seguel	1	6	7
WC	(Switzerland) P Schnyder	6	4	5
Q	(Slovakia) M Hončová	2	1
6	(Netherlands) C Burger	6	6

Semifinals
(Chile) D Seguel	3	0
6	(Netherlands) C Burger	6	6

=== Bottom half ===
First round
8	(Slovenia) D Jakupović	7^{7}	6
(Serbia) N Stojanović	6^{3}	0
(Russia) P Leykina	3	2
(Hungary) F Stollár	6	6
(Ukraine) M Zanevska	6	6^{5}	3
(Romania) C Dinu	2	7^{7}	6
(Romania) A Cadanțu	6	7^{7}
4	(Brazil) T Pereira	1	6^{3}
5	(Serbia) I Jorović	7	5	1
(Hungary) D Gálfi	5	7	6
(Croatia) T Lukas	6	4	6
WC	(Hungary) L Nagymihály	2	6	4
(Germany) T Korpatsch	7^{7}	6
(Hungary) RL Jani	6^{0}	2
(France) M Georges	3	4
2	(Russia) I Khromacheva	6	6

Second round
8	(Slovenia) D Jakupović	3	6	7^{7}
(Hungary) F Stollár	6	4	6^{4}
(Romania) C Dinu	3	2
(Romania) A Cadanțu	6	6
(Hungary) D Gálfi	6	6
(Croatia) T Lukas	0	2
(Germany) T Korpatsch	5	6^{3}
2	(Russia) I Khromacheva	7	7^{7}

Quarterfinals
8	(Slovenia) D Jakupović	6	3	2
(Romania) A Cadanțu	2	6	6
(Hungary) D Gálfi	3	6	2
2	(Russia) I Khromacheva	6	2	6

Semifinals
(Romania) A Cadanțu	2	2
2	(Russia) I Khromacheva	6	6
