= 2022 Budapest Open – Doubles =

Doubles
- 2022 Budapest Open

Final
- Champions: (Hungary) Anna Bondár (Belgium) Kimberley Zimmermann
- Runners-up: (Czech Republic) Jesika Malečková (Czech Republic) Renata Voráčová
- Score: 6–3, 2–6, [10–5]

Events
Singles	Doubles
← 2018 ·	Hungarian Pro Circuit Ladies Open	· 2023 →

This is the first edition of the event as a WTA 125 tournament. It was part of the ITF Women's Circuit from 2016 to 2018. Alexandra Cadanțu and Chantal Škamlová were the champions when the event was last held in 2018, but neither player participates this year.

Anna Bondár and Kimberley Zimmermann won the title, defeating Jesika Malečková and Renata Voráčová in the final, 6–3, 2–6, [10–5].

== Seeds ==
1. (Hungary) Anna Bondár / (Belgium) Kimberley Zimmermann (champions)
2. (Hungary) Tímea Babos / (Slovenia) Tamara Zidanšek (semifinals)
3. Angelina Gabueva / Anastasia Zakharova (semifinals)
4. (France) Elixane Lechemia / (Germany) Julia Lohoff (first round)

== Draw ==
=== Key ===
- Q = Qualifier
- WC = Wild card
- LL = Lucky loser
- Alt = Alternate
- SE = Special exempt
- PR = Protected ranking
- ITF = ITF entry
- JE = Junior exempt
- w/o = Walkover
- r = Retired
- d = Defaulted
- SR = Special ranking

=== Draw ===
First round
(Spain) C Bucșa; A Fomina-Klotz
(Brazil) I Gamarra Martins (India) P Thombare	w/o
3	A Gabueva; A Zakharova	6	7^{7}
(Spain) N Párrizas Díaz (Netherlands) A Rus	2	6^{4}
(Kazakhstan) Z Kulambayeva (Latvia) D Marcinkēviča	6	6
WC	(Hungary) K Molnár (Hungary) V Varga	4	3
(Czech Republic) A Dețiuc (Czech Republic) M Kolodziejová	7^{7}	5	[10]
(Hungary) A Nagy (Hungary) AK Tóth	6^{2}	7	[12]
(Czech Republic) J Malečková (Czech Republic) R Voráčová	3	6	[10]
4	(France) E Lechemia (Germany) J Lohoff	6	2	[6]
(Hungary) R Stolmar (Hungary) N Szabanin	w/o
(Uzbekistan) N Abduraimova (France) L Jeanjean

Quarterfinals
1	(Hungary) A Bondár (Belgium) K Zimmermann	0	6	[10]
(Brazil) I Gamarra Martins (India) P Thombare	6	4	[7]
3	A Gabueva; A Zakharova	6	6
(Kazakhstan) Z Kulambayeva (Latvia) D Marcinkēviča	4	0
(Hungary) A Nagy (Hungary) AK Tóth	5	2
(Czech Republic) J Malečková (Czech Republic) R Voráčová	7	6
(Hungary) R Stolmar (Hungary) N Szabanin	3	1
2	(Hungary) T Babos (Slovenia) T Zidanšek	6	6

Semifinals
1	(Hungary) A Bondár (Belgium) K Zimmermann	6	6
3	A Gabueva; A Zakharova	3	3
(Czech Republic) J Malečková (Czech Republic) R Voráčová	6	3	[10]
2	(Hungary) T Babos (Slovenia) T Zidanšek	3	6	[6]

Final
1	(Hungary) A Bondár (Belgium) K Zimmermann	6	2	[10]
(Czech Republic) J Malečková (Czech Republic) R Voráčová	3	6	[5]
