= 2022 Budapest Open – Singles =

Singles
- 2022 Budapest Open

Final
- Champion: (Germany) Tamara Korpatsch
- Runner-up: (Bulgaria) Viktoriya Tomova
- Score: 7–6^{(7–3)}, 6–7^{(4–7)}, 6–0

Events
Singles	Doubles
← 2018 ·	Hungarian Pro Circuit Ladies Open	· 2023 →

This is the first edition of the event as a WTA 125 tournament. It was part of the ITF Women's Circuit from 2016 to 2018. Viktória Kužmová was the champion when the event was last held in 2018, but lost in the first round of qualifying to Amarissa Kiara Tóth.

Tamara Korpatsch won the title, defeating Viktoriya Tomova in the final, 7–6^{(7–3)}, 6–7^{(4–7)}, 6–0.

== Seeds ==
1. (Romania) Irina-Camelia Begu (withdrew)
2. (Hungary) Anna Bondár (semifinals)
3. (Italy) Jasmine Paolini (first round)
4. (Italy) Lucia Bronzetti (first round)
5. (Spain) Nuria Párrizas Díaz (first round)
6. (Germany) Jule Niemeier (second round)
7. (Egypt) Mayar Sherif (second round)
8. (Hungary) Panna Udvardy (first round)

== Draw ==
=== Key ===
- Q = Qualifier
- WC = Wild card
- LL = Lucky loser
- Alt = Alternate
- SE = Special exempt
- PR = Protected ranking
- ITF = ITF entry
- JE = Junior exempt
- w/o = Walkover
- r = Retired
- d = Defaulted
- SR = Special ranking

=== Finals ===
Semifinals
(France) Océane Dodin	6	3	1^{r}
(Bulgaria) Viktoriya Tomova	4	6	4
Q	(Germany) Tamara Korpatsch	7	6
2	(Hungary) Anna Bondár	5	4

Final
(Bulgaria) Viktoriya Tomova	6^{3}	7^{7}	0
Q	(Germany) Tamara Korpatsch	7^{7}	6^{4}	6

=== Top half ===
First round
LL	E Andreeva	6	6
WC	(Hungary) Rebeka Stolmár	1	1
(Romania) I Bara	6^{3}	3
(France) O Dodin	7^{7}	6
Q	(United States) E Navarro	7^{7}	7^{7}
(Hungary) D Gálfi	6^{5}	6^{3}
(United States) L Davis	6	6
5	(Spain) N Párrizas Díaz	3	3
3	(Italy) J Paolini	6	0	2
(Bulgaria) V Tomova	4	6	6
(Austria) J Grabher	6	6
WC	(Hungary) T Babos	3	4
Q	(Brazil) C Alves	0	3
(Slovakia) AK Schmiedlová	6	6
Q	(Czech Republic) J Malečková	7	6^{7}	3
7	(Egypt) M Sherif	5	7^{9}	6

Second round
LL	E Andreeva	4	4
(France) O Dodin	6	6
Q	(United States) E Navarro	5	4
(United States) L Davis	7	6
(Bulgaria) V Tomova	3	6	7
(Austria) J Grabher	6	1	5
(Slovakia) AK Schmiedlová	6	6
7	(Egypt) M Sherif	3	2

Quarterfinals
(France) O Dodin	5	7	6
(United States) L Davis	7	5	2
(Bulgaria) V Tomova	6	7
(Slovakia) AK Schmiedlová	1	5

Semifinals
(France) O Dodin	6	3	1^{r}
(Bulgaria) V Tomova	4	6	4

=== Bottom half ===
First round
8	(Hungary) P Udvardy	4	1
WC	(Hungary) N Szabanin	6	6
(Brazil) L Pigossi	2	2
(Netherlands) A Rus	6	6
SE	(Hungary) RL Jani	4	2
(Montenegro) D Kovinić	6	6
Q	(Germany) T Korpatsch	2	6	6
4	(Italy) L Bronzetti	6	4	4
6	(Germany) J Niemeier	6	5	6
(Poland) M Fręch	4	7	3
(Slovenia) T Zidanšek	6	7
WC	(Hungary) F Stollár	1	5
(Spain) C Bucșa	0^{r}
(Switzerland) S Waltert	4
(Italy) E Cocciaretto	2	2
2	(Hungary) A Bondár	6	6

Second round
WC	(Hungary) N Szabanin	6	4	4
(Netherlands) A Rus	4	6	6
(Montenegro) D Kovinić	3	6	5
Q	(Germany) T Korpatsch	6	1	7
6	(Germany) J Niemeier	3	6^{11}
(Slovenia) T Zidanšek	6	7^{13}
(Switzerland) S Waltert	7	4	5
2	(Hungary) A Bondár	5	6	7

Quarterfinals
(Netherlands) A Rus	3	6	0
Q	(Germany) T Korpatsch	6	3	6
(Slovenia) T Zidanšek	4	6	1
2	(Hungary) A Bondár	6	3	6

Semifinals
Q	(Germany) T Korpatsch	7	6
2	(Hungary) A Bondár	5	4

== Qualifying ==
=== Seeds ===
1. (Germany) Tamara Korpatsch (qualified)
2. (Switzerland) Simona Waltert (moved to the main draw)
3. (Romania) Irina Bara (moved to the main draw)
4. (United States) Emma Navarro (qualified)
5. (France) Léolia Jeanjean (qualifying competition, retired)
6. Erika Andreeva (qualifying competition, lucky loser)
1. (Slovakia) Viktória Kužmová (first round)
2. (Serbia) Olga Danilović (first round, retired)

=== Qualifiers ===
1. (Germany) Tamara Korpatsch
2. (Brazil) Carolina Alves
3. (Czech Republic) Jesika Malečková
4. (United States) Emma Navarro

=== Lucky loser ===
1. Erika Andreeva

=== Draw ===
==== First qualifier ====
First round
1	(Germany) Tamara Korpatsch	6	6
(Argentina) María Lourdes Carlé	2	3
(Latvia) Diāna Marcinkēviča	6	3	2
5	(France) Léolia Jeanjean	4	6	6

Qualifying competition
1	(Germany) Tamara Korpatsch	6	0
5	(France) Léolia Jeanjean	2	0^{r}

==== Second qualifier ====
First round
Alt	(Brazil) Ingrid Gamarra Martins	0	2
(Brazil) Carolina Alves	6	6
WC	(Hungary) Amarissa Kiara Tóth	6	6
7	(Slovakia) Viktória Kužmová	4	1

Qualifying competition
(Brazil) Carolina Alves	6	1	6
WC	(Hungary) Amarissa Kiara Tóth	4	6	4

==== Third qualifier ====
First round
Alt	Angelina Gabueva	3	5
(Czech Republic) Jesika Malečková	6	7
WC	(Hungary) Adrienn Nagy	6	5	1
6	Erika Andreeva	3	7	6

Qualifying competition
(Czech Republic) Jesika Malečková	2	7	6
6	Erika Andreeva	6	5	3

==== Fourth qualifier ====
First round
4	(United States) Emma Navarro	6	4	6
Anastasia Zakharova	1	6	0
(Uzbekistan) Nigina Abduraimova	6	1
8	(Serbia) Olga Danilović	4	0^{r}

Qualifying competition
4	(United States) Emma Navarro	6	6
(Uzbekistan) Nigina Abduraimova	3	2
