= 2018 Hungarian Pro Circuit Ladies Open – Singles =

Singles
- 2018 Hungarian Pro Circuit Ladies Open

Final
- Champion: (Slovakia) Viktória Kužmová
- Runner-up: (Russia) Ekaterina Alexandrova
- Score: 6–3, 4–6, 6–1

Events
Singles	Doubles
← 2017 ·	Hungarian Pro Circuit Ladies Open	· 2019 →

Jana Čepelová was the defending champion, but lost in the first round to Réka Luca Jani.

Viktória Kužmová won the title, defeating Ekaterina Alexandrova in the final, 6–3, 4–6, 6–1.

== Seeds ==
1. (Slovakia) Viktória Kužmová (champion)
2. (China) Wang Yafan (second round)
3. (Slovakia) Anna Karolína Schmiedlová (semifinals)
4. (Slovenia) Dalila Jakupović (first round)
5. (Slovenia) Tamara Zidanšek (quarterfinals)
6. (Colombia) Mariana Duque Mariño (first round)
7. (Czech Republic) Markéta Vondroušová (second round)
8. (Russia) Ekaterina Alexandrova (final)

== Draw ==
=== Key ===
- Q = Qualifier
- WC = Wild card
- LL = Lucky loser
- Alt = Alternate
- SE = Special exempt
- PR = Protected ranking
- ITF = ITF entry
- JE = Junior exempt
- w/o = Walkover
- r = Retired
- d = Defaulted
- SR = Special ranking

=== Finals ===
Semifinals
1	(Slovakia) Viktória Kužmová	6	6
3	(Slovakia) Anna Karolína Schmiedlová	2	0
8	(Russia) Ekaterina Alexandrova	6	2	6
(Ukraine) Dayana Yastremska	2	6	4

Final
1	(Slovakia) Viktória Kužmová	6	4	6
8	(Russia) Ekaterina Alexandrova	3	6	1

=== Top half ===
First round
1	(Slovakia) V Kužmová	6	6
Q	(Russia) A Fomina	4	4
WC	(Hungary) RL Jani	6	6
(Slovakia) J Čepelová	3	1
(Russia) I Khromacheva	3	2^{r}
LL	(Russia) A Panova	6	1
WC	(Hungary) D Gálfi	5	7	6
6	(Colombia) M Duque Mariño	7	5	4
3	(Slovakia) AK Schmiedlová	6	6
Q	(Czech Republic) M Pantůčková	2	4
(Slovakia) C Škamlová	1	1
(Bulgaria) S Karatantcheva	6	6
(Kazakhstan) E Rybakina	5	4
(Romania) A Cadanțu	7	6
Q	(Romania) N Dascălu	1	6	5
5	(Slovenia) T Zidanšek	6	4	7

Second round
1	(Slovakia) V Kužmová	6	6
WC	(Hungary) RL Jani	3	1
LL	(Russia) A Panova	7	6
WC	(Hungary) D Gálfi	5	1
3	(Slovakia) AK Schmiedlová	6	6
(Bulgaria) S Karatantcheva	4	3
(Romania) A Cadanțu	1	6^{1}
5	(Slovenia) T Zidanšek	6	7^{7}

Quarterfinals
1	(Slovakia) V Kužmová	6	6
LL	(Russia) A Panova	2	4
3	(Slovakia) AK Schmiedlová	6	6
5	(Slovenia) T Zidanšek	4	2

Semifinals
1	(Slovakia) V Kužmová	6	6
3	(Slovakia) AK Schmiedlová	2	0

=== Bottom half ===
First round
8	(Russia) E Alexandrova	1	7	6
(Bulgaria) V Tomova	6	5	3
(Ukraine) K Zavatska	2	6	2
WC	(Hungary) A Bondár	6	1	6
Q	(Hungary) P Udvardy	6^{4}	6	2
(Montenegro) D Kovinić	7^{7}	3	6
(Tunisia) O Jabeur	6	6
4	(Slovenia) D Jakupović	2	2
7	(Czech Republic) M Vondroušová	6	7^{7}
WC	(Hungary) Á Bukta	2	6^{3}
(Romania) A Dulgheru	1	6	1
(Ukraine) D Yastremska	6	4	6
(Croatia) T Lukas	6	6
(Hungary) G Arn	2	4
(United States) K Stewart	6	3	3
2	(China) Y Wang	4	6	6

Second round
8	(Russia) E Alexandrova	7^{7}	6
WC	(Hungary) A Bondár	6^{1}	4
(Montenegro) D Kovinić	2	1
(Tunisia) O Jabeur	6	6
7	(Czech Republic) M Vondroušová	6^{6}	2
(Ukraine) D Yastremska	7^{8}	6
(Croatia) T Lukas	5	7	6
2	(China) Y Wang	7	5	3

Quarterfinals
8	(Russia) E Alexandrova	6	6
(Tunisia) O Jabeur	4	3
(Ukraine) D Yastremska	6	6
(Croatia) T Lukas	3	3

Semifinals
8	(Russia) E Alexandrova	6	2	6
(Ukraine) D Yastremska	2	6	4
