= 2015 Nana Trophy – Doubles =

Doubles
- 2015 Nana Trophy

Final
- Champions: (Argentina) María Irigoyen (Poland) Paula Kania
- Runners-up: (France) Julie Coin (France) Stéphanie Foretz
- Score: 6–1, 6–3

Events
Singles	Doubles
← 2014 ·	Nana Trophy	· 2016 →

Andrea Gámiz and Valeria Savinykh were the defending champions, however Gámiz chose not to participate. Savinykh partnered Xenia Knoll, but lost in the first round.

The top seeds María Irigoyen and Paula Kania won the title, defeating second seeds Julie Coin and Stéphanie Foretz in the final, 6–1, 6–3.

== Seeds ==
1. (Argentina) María Irigoyen / (Poland) Paula Kania (champions)
2. (France) Julie Coin / (France) Stéphanie Foretz (final)
3. (Netherlands) Lesley Kerkhove / (Netherlands) Ana Vrljić (semifinals)
4. (Switzerland) Xenia Knoll / (Russia) Valeria Savinykh (first round)

== Draw ==
=== Key ===
- Q = Qualifier
- WC = Wild card
- LL = Lucky loser
- Alt = Alternate
- SE = Special exempt
- PR = Protected ranking
- ITF = ITF entry
- JE = Junior exempt
- w/o = Walkover
- r = Retired
- d = Defaulted
- SR = Special ranking

First round
1	(Argentina) M Irigoyen (Poland) P Kania	6	6
(Austria) P König (Argentina) N Podoroska	1	1
(Georgia (country)) S Shapatava (Ukraine) A Vasylyeva	0	6	[7]
(Slovenia) N Kolar (Austria) Y Neuwirth	6	3	[10]
3	(Netherlands) L Kerkhove (Croatia) A Vrljić	6	6
WC	(Tunisia) Y Ben Abdallah (Tunisia) O Charrad	0	1
(France) M Arcangioli (France) C Paquet	4	2
(Bulgaria) E Kostova (Russia) P Leykina	6	6
(Switzerland) C Perrin (Bulgaria) I Shinikova	6	2	[10]
(Turkey) P Özgen (Turkey) İ Soylu	3	6	[2]
(Netherlands) C Burger (Belgium) E Mertens	6	6
4	(Switzerland) X Knoll (Russia) V Savinykh	3	4
(United Kingdom) T Moore (United Kingdom) N Slater	3	1
(United States) J Abaza (United States) A Glatch	6	6
(South Africa) I Hattingh (United Kingdom) F Stephenson	0	6^{5}
2	(France) J Coin (France) S Foretz	6	7^{7}

Quarterfinals
1	(Argentina) M Irigoyen (Poland) P Kania	6	6
(Slovenia) N Kolar (Austria) Y Neuwirth	3	2
3	(Netherlands) L Kerkhove (Croatia) A Vrljić	6^{5}	6	[10]
(Bulgaria) E Kostova (Russia) P Leykina	7^{7}	4	[7]
(Switzerland) C Perrin (Bulgaria) I Shinikova	6	3	[14]
(Netherlands) C Burger (Belgium) E Mertens	2	6	[12]
(United States) J Abaza (United States) A Glatch	3	2
2	(France) J Coin (France) S Foretz	6	6

Semifinals
1	(Argentina) M Irigoyen (Poland) P Kania	6	6
3	(Netherlands) L Kerkhove (Croatia) A Vrljić	0	2
(Switzerland) C Perrin (Bulgaria) I Shinikova	3	6	[6]
2	(France) J Coin (France) S Foretz	6	4	[10]

Final
1	(Argentina) M Irigoyen (Poland) P Kania	6	6
2	(France) J Coin (France) S Foretz	1	3
