= 2016 Sport11 Ladies Open – Doubles =

Doubles
- 2016 Sport11 Ladies Open

Final
- Champions: (Netherlands) Cindy Burger (Netherlands) Arantxa Rus
- Runners-up: (Hungary) Ágnes Bukta (Czech Republic) Jesika Malečková
- Score: 6–1, 6–4

Events
Singles	Doubles
Sport11 Ladies Open	· 2017 →

This was a new event in the ITF Women's Circuit.

Cindy Burger and Arantxa Rus won the inaugural title, defeating Ágnes Bukta and Jesika Malečková in the final, 6–1, 6–4.

== Seeds ==
1. (Netherlands) Lesley Kerkhove / (Russia) Irina Khromacheva (semifinals)
2. (Hungary) Réka Luca Jani / (Ukraine) Maryna Zanevska (semifinals)
3. (Netherlands) Cindy Burger / (Netherlands) Arantxa Rus (champions)
4. (Romania) Alexandra Cadanțu / (Russia) Polina Leykina (first round)

== Draw ==
=== Key ===
- Q = Qualifier
- WC = Wild card
- LL = Lucky loser
- Alt = Alternate
- SE = Special exempt
- PR = Protected ranking
- ITF = ITF entry
- JE = Junior exempt
- w/o = Walkover
- r = Retired
- d = Defaulted
- SR = Special ranking

First round
(Bosnia and Herzegovina) A Husarić (Slovenia) D Jakupović	w/o
(Spain) G García Pérez (Hungary) F Stollár
(Hungary) N Müller (Hungary) D Toronyi	0	0
(Austria) M Klaffner (Austria) S Klemenschits	6	6
(Hungary) Á Bukta (Czech Republic) J Malečková	2	6	[10]
(Russia) A Pribylova (Serbia) N Stojanović	6	1	[7]
(Serbia) B Bonić (Israel) E Masuri	6^{9}	6	[10]
4	(Romania) A Cadanțu (Russia) P Leykina	7^{11}	3	[5]
(Hungary) D Gálfi (Romania) EG Ruse	6	6
(Uzbekistan) A Amanmuradova (Slovakia) M Hončová	0	3

Quarterfinals
1	(Netherlands) L Kerkhove (Russia) I Khromacheva	6	6
(Bosnia and Herzegovina) A Husarić (Slovenia) D Jakupović	3	3
3/WC	(Netherlands) C Burger (Netherlands) A Rus	6	3	[10]
(Austria) M Klaffner (Austria) S Klemenschits	3	6	[5]
(Hungary) Á Bukta (Czech Republic) J Malečková	6	6
(Serbia) B Bonić (Israel) E Masuri	4	1
(Hungary) D Gálfi (Romania) EG Ruse	6	3	[5]
2	(Hungary) RL Jani (Ukraine) M Zanevska	4	6	[10]

Semifinals
1	(Netherlands) L Kerkhove (Russia) I Khromacheva	3	6^{4}
3/WC	(Netherlands) C Burger (Netherlands) A Rus	6	7^{7}
(Hungary) Á Bukta (Czech Republic) J Malečková	2	6	[10]
2	(Hungary) RL Jani (Ukraine) M Zanevska	6	4	[6]

Final
3/WC	(Netherlands) C Burger (Netherlands) A Rus	6	6
(Hungary) Á Bukta (Czech Republic) J Malečková	1	4
