= 2015 Nana Trophy – Singles =

Singles
- 2015 Nana Trophy

Final
- Champion: (Argentina) María Irigoyen
- Runner-up: (Netherlands) Cindy Burger
- Score: 6–2, 7–5

Events
Singles	Doubles
← 2014 ·	Nana Trophy	· 2016 →

Ons Jabeur was the defending champion, but lost in the quarterfinals to María Irigoyen.

Irigoyen then went on to win the title, defeating Cindy Burger in the final, 6–2, 7–5.

== Seeds ==
1. (Tunisia) Ons Jabeur (quarterfinals)
2. (Poland) Paula Kania (second round)
3. (Luxembourg) Mandy Minella (second round)
4. (Japan) Risa Ozaki (quarterfinals)
5. (France) Stéphanie Foretz (first round)
6. (Bulgaria) Elitsa Kostova (quarterfinals; retired)
7. (United States) Alexa Glatch (second round)
8. (Peru) Bianca Botto (second round)

== Main draw ==
=== Key ===
- Q = Qualifier
- WC = Wild card
- LL = Lucky loser
- Alt = Alternate
- SE = Special exempt
- PR = Protected ranking
- ITF = ITF entry
- JE = Junior exempt
- w/o = Walkover
- r = Retired
- d = Defaulted
- SR = Special ranking

=== Finals ===
Semifinals
(Argentina) María Irigoyen	6	4	6
(Netherlands) Lesley Kerkhove	2	6	2
(Greece) Maria Sakkari	2	0
(Netherlands) Cindy Burger	6	6

Final
(Argentina) María Irigoyen	6	7
(Netherlands) Cindy Burger	2	5

=== Top half ===
First round
1	(Tunisia) O Jabeur	6	6
Q	(United States) J Abaza	3	4
(Turkey) P Özgen	6^{4}	6	4
(Slovenia) N Kolar	7^{7}	4	6
(Switzerland) X Knoll	2	1
(Argentina) M Irigoyen	6	6
WC	(Turkey) B Eraydın	4	4
8	(Peru) B Botto	6	6
3	(Luxembourg) M Minella	6	6
WC	(Russia) V Savinykh	2	2
(Netherlands) L Kerkhove	6	5	6
(Canada) H El Tabakh	1	7	2
(Belgium) E Mertens	6	6
Q	(Switzerland) C Perrin	2	1
WC	(Tunisia) C Ben Cheikh	0	0
6	(Bulgaria) E Kostova	6	6

Second round
1	(Tunisia) O Jabeur	6	6
(Slovenia) N Kolar	4	2
(Argentina) M Irigoyen	6	6
8	(Peru) B Botto	0	0
3	(Luxembourg) M Minella	4	6	2
(Netherlands) L Kerkhove	6	3	6
(Belgium) E Mertens	7^{7}	4	5
6	(Bulgaria) E Kostova	6^{3}	6	7

Quarterfinals
1	(Tunisia) O Jabeur	6^{1}	6	5
(Argentina) M Irigoyen	7^{7}	4	7
(Netherlands) L Kerkhove	4	7	0
6	(Bulgaria) E Kostova	6	5	0^{r}

Semifinals
(Argentina) M Irigoyen	6	4	6
(Netherlands) L Kerkhove	2	6	2

=== Bottom half ===
First round
7	(United States) A Glatch	6	7^{7}
(Georgia (country)) S Shapatava	4	6^{4}
WC	(Bulgaria) P Arshinkova	1	2
(Greece) M Sakkari	6	6
Q	(Italy) A Savoretti	6	6
(Croatia) A Vrljić	2	0
(Turkey) İ Soylu	6^{5}	4
4	(Japan) R Ozaki	7^{7}	6
5	(France) S Foretz	6	4	3
(France) J Coin	3	6	6
(Czech Republic) T Martincová	4	4
(Netherlands) C Burger	6	6
Q	(France) M Arcangioli	3	6^{4}
(Sweden) R Peterson	6	7^{7}
(Ukraine) A Vasylyeva	5	0
2	(Poland) P Kania	7	6

Second round
7	(United States) A Glatch	2	6	4
(Greece) M Sakkari	6	2	6
Q	(Italy) A Savoretti	4	5
4	(Japan) R Ozaki	6	7
(France) J Coin	4	3
(Netherlands) C Burger	6	6
(Sweden) R Peterson	2	6	6
2	(Poland) P Kania	6	1	2

Quarterfinals
(Greece) M Sakkari	6	1	6
4	(Japan) R Ozaki	3	6	3
(Netherlands) C Burger	6	6
(Sweden) R Peterson	3	0

Semifinals
(Greece) M Sakkari	2	0
(Netherlands) C Burger	6	6
