= 2018 Hungarian Pro Circuit Ladies Open – Doubles =

Doubles
- 2018 Hungarian Pro Circuit Ladies Open

Final
- Champions: (Romania) Alexandra Cadanțu (Slovakia) Chantal Škamlová
- Runners-up: (United States) Kaitlyn Christian (Mexico) Giuliana Olmos
- Score: 6–1, 6–3

Events
Singles	Doubles
← 2017 ·	Hungarian Pro Circuit Ladies Open	· 2019 →

Mariana Duque Mariño and María Irigoyen were the defending champions, but Duque Mariño chose not to participate. Irigoyen partnered Danka Kovinić, but lost in the quarterfinals to Akgul Amanmuradova and Natela Dzalamidze.

Alexandra Cadanțu and Chantal Škamlová won the title, defeating Kaitlyn Christian and Giuliana Olmos in the final, 6–1, 6–3.

== Seeds ==
1. (Slovenia) Dalila Jakupović / (Russia) Irina Khromacheva (first round)
2. (United States) Kaitlyn Christian / (Mexico) Giuliana Olmos (final)
3. (Sweden) Cornelia Lister / (Czech Republic) Markéta Vondroušová (quarterfinals)
4. (Argentina) María Irigoyen / (Montenegro) Danka Kovinić (quarterfinals)

== Draw ==
=== Key ===
- Q = Qualifier
- WC = Wild card
- LL = Lucky loser
- Alt = Alternate
- SE = Special exempt
- PR = Protected ranking
- ITF = ITF entry
- JE = Junior exempt
- w/o = Walkover
- r = Retired
- d = Defaulted
- SR = Special ranking

=== Draw ===
First round
1	(Slovenia) D Jakupović (Russia) I Khromacheva	3	6	[6]
(Romania) A Cadanțu (Slovakia) C Škamlová	6	4	[10]
(Hungary) RL Jani (Argentina) N Podoroska	2	6^{5}
(Hungary) A Bondár (Hungary) P Udvardy	6	7^{7}
3	(Sweden) C Lister (Czech Republic) M Vondroušová	6	6
WC	(Hungary) A Horváth (Hungary) R Zádori	0	0
(Russia) P Golubovskaya (Russia) S Golubovskaya	6	6
WC	(Hungary) R Fárbás (Hungary) L Nagymihály	2	3
(Uzbekistan) A Amanmuradova (Russia) N Dzalamidze	6	6^{5}	[14]
(Bulgaria) D Evtimova (United States) K Stewart	3	7^{7}	[12]
(Russia) A Fomina (Russia) E Yashina	4	6^{3}
4	(Argentina) M Irigoyen (Montenegro) D Kovinić	6	7^{7}
(Russia) A Panova (Kazakhstan) G Voskoboeva	7	6
(Hungary) Á Bukta (Hungary) D Gálfi	5	2
(Romania) N Dascălu (Russia) M Marfutina	2	3
2	(United States) K Christian (Mexico) G Olmos	6	6

Quarterfinals
(Romania) A Cadanțu (Slovakia) C Škamlová	7	3	[13]
(Hungary) A Bondár (Hungary) P Udvardy	5	6	[11]
3	(Sweden) C Lister (Czech Republic) M Vondroušová	4	6	[9]
(Russia) P Golubovskaya (Russia) S Golubovskaya	6	3	[11]
(Uzbekistan) A Amanmuradova (Russia) N Dzalamidze	7	7^{7}
4	(Argentina) M Irigoyen (Montenegro) D Kovinić	5	6^{5}
(Russia) A Panova (Kazakhstan) G Voskoboeva	5	6	[8]
2	(United States) K Christian (Mexico) G Olmos	7	3	[10]

Semifinals
(Romania) A Cadanțu (Slovakia) C Škamlová	6	6
(Russia) P Golubovskaya (Russia) S Golubovskaya	3	4
(Uzbekistan) A Amanmuradova (Russia) N Dzalamidze	6	3	[2]
2	(United States) K Christian (Mexico) G Olmos	4	6	[10]

Final
(Romania) A Cadanțu (Slovakia) C Škamlová	6	6
2	(United States) K Christian (Mexico) G Olmos	1	3
