= 2022 Budapest Open =

- Date: 19–24 September
- Edition: 4th
- Category: WTA 125
- Draw: 32S / 16D
- Prize money: $115,000
- Surface: Clay
- Location: Budapest, Hungary
- Venue: Római Teniszakadémia

Champions

Singles
- (Germany) Tamara Korpatsch

Doubles
- (Hungary) Anna Bondár / (Belgium) Kimberley Zimmermann
- Hungarian Pro Circuit Ladies Open

The 2022 Budapest Open was a professional tennis tournament played on outdoor clay courts. It was the fourth edition of the tournament and first as a WTA 125 which is also part of the 2022 WTA 125 tournaments, offering a total of $115,000 in prize money. It took place at the Római Teniszakadémia in Budapest, Hungary between 19 and 24 September 2022.

== Champions ==
=== Singles ===
- (Germany) Tamara Korpatsch def. (Bulgaria) Viktoriya Tomova 7–6^{(7–3)}, 6–7^{(4–7)}, 6–0

=== Doubles ===
- (Hungary) Anna Bondár / (Belgium) Kimberley Zimmermann def. (Czech Republic) Jesika Malečková / (Czech Republic) Renata Voráčová 6–3, 2–6, [10–5]

== Singles entrants ==
=== Seeds ===
Country	Player	Rank^{1}	Seed
~~ROU~~	~~Irina-Camelia Begu~~	~~41~~	~~1~~
HUN	Anna Bondár	52	2
ITA	Jasmine Paolini	55	3
ITA	Lucia Bronzetti	57	4
ESP	Nuria Párrizas Díaz	63	5
GER	Jule Niemeier	73	6
EGY	Mayar Sherif	74	7
HUN	Panna Udvardy	76	8

- ^{1} Rankings are as of 12 September 2022.

=== Other entrants ===
The following players received a wildcard into the singles main draw:

- (Hungary) Tímea Babos
- ~~(Romania) Irina-Camelia Begu~~
- (Hungary) Fanny Stollár
- (Hungary) Rebeka Stolmár
- (Hungary) Natália Szabanin

The following players received entry with a special exempt:

- (Hungary) Réka Luca Jani

The following players qualified into the singles main draw:

- (Brazil) Carolina Alves
- (Germany) Tamara Korpatsch
- (Czech Republic) Jesika Malečková
- (United States) Emma Navarro

The following player received entry as a lucky loser:

- Erika Andreeva

=== Withdrawals ===
Before the tournament

- (Romania) Irina-Camelia Begu → replaced by Erika Andreeva
- (Romania) Ana Bogdan → replaced by (Switzerland) Simona Waltert
- (Switzerland) Viktorija Golubic → replaced by (Germany) Jule Niemeier
- (Slovenia) Kaja Juvan → replaced by (Austria) Julia Grabher
- (France) Harmony Tan → replaced by (Romania) Irina Bara
- (Denmark) Clara Tauson → replaced by (France) Harmony Tan
- (Belgium) Maryna Zanevska → replaced by (Spain) Cristina Bucșa

== Doubles entrants ==
=== Seeds ===
Country	Player	Country	Player	Rank^{1}	Seed
HUN	Anna Bondár	BEL	Kimberley Zimmermann	105	1
HUN	Tímea Babos	SLO	Tamara Zidanšek	188	2
	Angelina Gabueva		Anastasia Zakharova	197	3
FRA	Elixane Lechemia	GER	Julia Lohoff	233	4

- ^{1} Rankings as of 12 September 2022.

=== Other entrants ===
The following pair received a wildcard into the doubles main draw:

- (Hungary) Kitti Molnár / (Hungary) Viktória Varga
