= 2016 Nana Trophy =

- Date: 2–8 May
- Edition: 5th
- Category: ITF Women's Circuit
- Prize money: $50,000
- Surface: Clay
- Location: Tunis, Tunisia

Champions

Singles
- (Tunisia) Ons Jabeur

Doubles
- (Australia) Arina Rodionova / (Ukraine) Valeriya Strakhova
- Nana Trophy

The 2016 Nana Trophy was a professional tennis tournament played on outdoor clay courts. It was the fifth edition of the tournament and part of the 2016 ITF Women's Circuit, offering a total of $50,000 in prize money. It took place in Tunis, Tunisia, on 2–8 May 2016.

== Singles main draw entrants ==
=== Seeds ===
| Country | Player | Rank^{1} | Seed |
|---|---|---|---|
| RUS | Evgeniya Rodina | 119 | 2 |
| SUI | Romina Oprandi | 137 | 2 |
| BEL | Ysaline Bonaventure | 147 | 3 |
| RUS | Irina Khromacheva | 157 | 4 |
| CZE | Tereza Smitková | 161 | 5 |
| NED | Lesley Kerkhove | 174 | 6 |
| TUR | İpek Soylu | 176 | 7 |
| FRA | Myrtille Georges | 202 | 8 |

- ^{1} Rankings as of 25 April 2016.

=== Other entrants ===
The following players received wildcards into the singles main draw:

- (France) Fiona Codino
- (Bosnia and Herzegovina) Dea Herdželaš
- (France) Yasmine Mansouri
- (Egypt) Sandra Samir

The following players received entry from the qualifying draw:

- (Russia) Maria Marfutina
- (Turkey) Pemra Özgen
- (Argentina) Nadia Podoroska
- (Switzerland) Patty Schnyder

== Champions ==
=== Singles ===
- (Tunisia) Ons Jabeur def. (Switzerland) Romina Oprandi, 1–6, 6–2, 6–2

=== Doubles ===
- (Australia) Arina Rodionova / (Ukraine) Valeriya Strakhova def. (Russia) Irina Khromacheva / (Turkey) İpek Soylu, 6–1, 6–2
