= 2016 Nana Trophy – Singles =

Singles
- 2016 Nana Trophy

Final
- Champion: (Tunisia) Ons Jabeur
- Runner-up: (Switzerland) Romina Oprandi
- Score: 1–6, 6–2, 6–2

Events
Singles	Doubles
← 2015 ·	Nana Trophy	· 2017 →

María Irigoyen was the defending champion, but chose to participate in Madrid instead.

Ons Jabeur won the title, defeating Romina Oprandi in the final, 1–6, 6–2, 6–2.

== Seeds ==
1. (Russia) Evgeniya Rodina (second round)
2. (Switzerland) Romina Oprandi (final)
3. (Belgium) Ysaline Bonaventure (second round)
4. (Russia) Irina Khromacheva (semifinals)
5. (Czech Republic) Tereza Smitková (first round, retired)
6. (Netherlands) Lesley Kerkhove (semifinals)
7. (Turkey) İpek Soylu (first round)
8. (France) Myrtille Georges (quarterfinals)

== Main draw ==
=== Key ===
- Q = Qualifier
- WC = Wild card
- LL = Lucky loser
- Alt = Alternate
- SE = Special exempt
- PR = Protected ranking
- ITF = ITF entry
- JE = Junior exempt
- w/o = Walkover
- r = Retired
- d = Defaulted
- SR = Special ranking

=== Finals ===
Semifinals
(Tunisia) Ons Jabeur	6	6
4	(Russia) Irina Khromacheva	4	2
6	(Netherlands) Lesley Kerkhove	6	0	0
2	(Switzerland) Romina Oprandi	3	6	6

Final
(Tunisia) Ons Jabeur	1	6	6
2	(Switzerland) Romina Oprandi	6	2	2

=== Top half ===
First round
1	(Russia) E Rodina	3	7	6
(Liechtenstein) S Vogt	6	5	3
(Tunisia) O Jabeur	6	7^{7}
(Slovenia) T Zidanšek	4	6^{2}
Q	(Switzerland) P Schnyder	4	3
(Romania) A Cadanțu	6	6
(Bulgaria) I Shinikova	6	2
5	(Czech Republic) T Smitková	0	1^{r}
4	(Russia) I Khromacheva	7^{9}	6
(Chile) D Seguel	6^{7}	1
(Romania) C Dinu	6	4	7
Q	(Turkey) P Özgen	3	6	5
(France) S Foretz	6	6
(Netherlands) A Rus	3	1
(Ukraine) V Strakhova	7^{7}	3	3
8	(France) M Georges	6^{5}	6	6

Second round
1	(Russia) E Rodina	3	0
(Tunisia) O Jabeur	6	6
(Romania) A Cadanțu	2	1^{r}
(Bulgaria) I Shinikova	6	4
4	(Russia) I Khromacheva	6	6
(Romania) C Dinu	4	2
(France) S Foretz	4	2
8	(France) M Georges	6	6

Quarterfinals
(Tunisia) O Jabeur	6	6
(Bulgaria) I Shinikova	1	4
4	(Russia) I Khromacheva	6	6
8	(France) M Georges	4	2

Semifinals
(Tunisia) O Jabeur	6	6
4	(Russia) I Khromacheva	4	2

=== Bottom half ===
First round
6	(Netherlands) L Kerkhove	6	6
WC	(France) F Codino	1	0
WC	(Egypt) S Samir	6^{7}	6	3
(France) C Paquet	7^{9}	3	6
(Australia) Ar Rodionova	3	2
(France) S Reix	6	6
WC	(France) Y Mansouri	5	0
3	(Belgium) Y Bonaventure	7	6
7	(Turkey) İ Soylu	7	3	4
(Uzbekistan) S Sharipova	5	6	6
Q	(Argentina) N Podoroska	6	6
Q	(Russia) M Marfutina	4	0
WC	(Bosnia and Herzegovina) D Herdželaš	2	3
(Russia) A Komardina	6	6
(Croatia) A Vrljić	0	0
2	(Switzerland) R Oprandi	6	6

Second round
6	(Netherlands) L Kerkhove	3	6	7
(France) C Paquet	6	3	5
(France) S Reix	6	1	7
3	(Belgium) Y Bonaventure	4	6	5
(Uzbekistan) S Sharipova	7	6
Q	(Argentina) N Podoroska	5	2
(Russia) A Komardina	4	1
2	(Switzerland) R Oprandi	6	6

Quarterfinals
6	(Netherlands) L Kerkhove	3	6	6
(France) S Reix	6	4	4
(Uzbekistan) S Sharipova	1	0
2	(Switzerland) R Oprandi	6	6

Semifinals
6	(Netherlands) L Kerkhove	6	0	0
2	(Switzerland) R Oprandi	3	6	6
