= 2016 Nana Trophy – Doubles =

Doubles
- 2016 Nana Trophy

Final
- Champions: (Australia) Arina Rodionova (Ukraine) Valeriya Strakhova
- Runners-up: (Russia) Irina Khromacheva (Turkey) İpek Soylu
- Score: 6–1, 6–2

Events
Singles	Doubles
← 2015 ·	Nana Trophy	· 2017 →

María Irigoyen and Paula Kania were the defending champions, but both players chose not to participate.

Arina Rodionova and Valeriya Strakhova won the title, defeating Irina Khromacheva and İpek Soylu in the final, 6–1, 6–2.

== Seeds ==
1. (Belgium) Ysaline Bonaventure / (Liechtenstein) Stephanie Vogt (semifinals)
2. (Russia) Irina Khromacheva / (Turkey) İpek Soylu (final)
3. (France) Stéphanie Foretz / (Netherlands) Lesley Kerkhove (semifinals)
4. (Australia) Arina Rodionova / (Ukraine) Valeriya Strakhova (champions)

== Draw ==
=== Key ===
- Q = Qualifier
- WC = Wild card
- LL = Lucky loser
- Alt = Alternate
- SE = Special exempt
- PR = Protected ranking
- ITF = ITF entry
- JE = Junior exempt
- w/o = Walkover
- r = Retired
- d = Defaulted
- SR = Special ranking

First round
1	(Belgium) Y Bonaventure (Liechtenstein) S Vogt	w/o
(Canada) P Januskova (Egypt) S Samir
(Bulgaria) D Evtimova (United States) M Kobelt	2	2
(Romania) A Cadanțu (Romania) C Dinu	6	6
4	(Australia) Ar Rodionova (Ukraine) V Strakhova	6	6
(France) K Davesne (United Kingdom) M Njoze	3	3
(France) C de Bernardi (France) S Reix	6	6
(France) F Codino (France) M Georges	2	1
(India) S Bavisetti (Russia) M Marfutina	1	1
(Brazil) L Pigossi (Chile) D Seguel	6	6
(Canada) N Baloescu (Canada) A-S Courteau	3	1
3	(France) S Foretz (Netherlands) L Kerkhove	6	6
(Belarus) D Chernetsova (Greece) V Grammatikopoulou	3	4
(Uzbekistan) S Sharipova (Bulgaria) I Shinikova	6	6
(Russia) A Komardina (Ukraine) A Vasylyeva	6^{3}	4
2	(Russia) I Khromacheva (Turkey) İ Soylu	7^{7}	6

Quarterfinals
1	(Belgium) Y Bonaventure (Liechtenstein) S Vogt	6	6
(Romania) A Cadanțu (Romania) C Dinu	4	3
4	(Australia) Ar Rodionova (Ukraine) V Strakhova	7^{7}	3	[10]
(France) C de Bernardi (France) S Reix	6^{3}	6	[4]
(Brazil) L Pigossi (Chile) D Seguel	6	4	[6]
3	(France) S Foretz (Netherlands) L Kerkhove	1	6	[10]
(Uzbekistan) S Sharipova (Bulgaria) I Shinikova	3	2
2	(Russia) I Khromacheva (Turkey) İ Soylu	6	6

Semifinals
1	(Belgium) Y Bonaventure (Liechtenstein) S Vogt	3	4
4	(Australia) Ar Rodionova (Ukraine) V Strakhova	6	6
3	(France) S Foretz (Netherlands) L Kerkhove	2	2
2	(Russia) I Khromacheva (Turkey) İ Soylu	6	6

Final
4	(Australia) Ar Rodionova (Ukraine) V Strakhova	6	6
2	(Russia) I Khromacheva (Turkey) İ Soylu	1	2
