= Nana Trophy =

Defunct tennis tournament
- Event name: Tunis
- Founded: 2012; 14 years ago
- Location: Tunis; Tunisia
- Venue: Tennis Club de Tunis
- Category: ITF Women's Circuit
- Surface: Clay
- Draw: 32S/32Q/16D
- Prize money: $25,000
- Website: Official website

The Nana Trophy was a tournament for professional female tennis players played on outdoor clay courts. The event was classified as a $25,000 ITF Women's Circuit tournament and was held in Tunis, Tunisia, annually, from 2012 until 2019. The event was a $60,000 tournament from 2015 to 2017.

== Past finals ==
=== Singles ===
Year	Champion	Runner-up	Score
2012	(Poland) Sandra Zaniewska	(Tunisia) Ons Jabeur	6–4, 4–6, 6–2
2013	(Tunisia) Ons Jabeur	(Spain) Sara Sorribes Tormo	6–3, 6–2
2014	(Tunisia) Ons Jabeur (2)	(Russia) Valeria Savinykh	6–3, 7–6^{(7–4)}
2015	(Argentina) María Irigoyen	(Netherlands) Cindy Burger	6–2, 7–5
2016	(Tunisia) Ons Jabeur (3)	(Switzerland) Romina Oprandi	1–6, 6–2, 6–2
2017	(Netherlands) Richèl Hogenkamp	(North Macedonia) Lina Gjorcheska	7–5, 6–4
2018	(Russia) Valentyna Ivakhnenko	(France) Chloé Paquet	6–2, 6–2
2019	(Romania) Jaqueline Cristian	(Chile) Daniela Seguel	6–4, 6–0

=== Doubles ===
Year	Champions	Runners-up	Score
2012	(Romania) Elena Bogdan (Romania) Raluca Olaru	(Spain) Inés Ferrer Suárez (Netherlands) Richèl Hogenkamp	6–4, 6–3
2013	(Serbia) Aleksandra Krunić (Poland) Katarzyna Piter	(Hungary) Réka-Luca Jani (Russia) Eugeniya Pashkova	6–2, 3–6, [10–7]
2014	(Venezuela) Andrea Gámiz (Russia) Valeria Savinykh	(Spain) Beatriz García Vidagany (Russia) Marina Melnikova	6–4, 6–1
2015	(Argentina) María Irigoyen (Poland) Paula Kania	(France) Julie Coin (France) Stéphanie Foretz	6–1, 6–3
2016	(Australia) Arina Rodionova (Ukraine) Valeriya Strakhova	(Russia) Irina Khromacheva (Turkey) İpek Soylu	6–1, 6–2
2017	(Argentina) Guadalupe Pérez Rojas (Chile) Daniela Seguel	(Hungary) Ágnes Bukta (Slovakia) Vivien Juhászová	6–7^{(3–7)}, 6–3, [11–9]
2018	(Ukraine) Maryna Chernyshova (Australia) Seone Mendez	(Russia) Amina Anshba (Italy) Anastasia Grymalska	7–6^{(7–5)}, 6–4
2019	(Italy) Martina Colmegna (Italy) Anastasia Grymalska	(Romania) Jaqueline Cristian (Romania) Andreea Roșca	6–4, 6–2
