= Hungarian Pro Circuit Ladies Open =

Defunct tennis tournament
- Event name: Budapest Open (2022); Hungarian Pro Circuit Ladies Open (2018); Sport11 Ladies Open (2016–17)
- Location: Budapest, Hungary
- Venue: Római Teniszakadémia
- Category: WTA 125
- Surface: Clay
- Draw: 32S/16Q/16D
- Prize money: $115,000
- Website: sport11.hu

Current champions (2022)
- Women's singles: (Germany) Tamara Korpatsch
- Women's doubles: (Hungary) Anna Bondár (Belgium) Kimberley Zimmermann

The Hungarian Pro Circuit Ladies Open (previously known as the Sport11 Ladies Open) is a tournament for professional female tennis players played on outdoor clay courts. The event was classified as a $100,000 ITF Women's Circuit tournament and was held in Budapest, Hungary, from 2016 to 2018. In 2022, the tournament made a comeback after being rebranded as the Budapest Open 125, a $115,000 tournament on the WTA Challenger Tour.

== Past finals ==
=== Singles ===
Year	Champion	Runner-up	Score
2022	(Germany) Tamara Korpatsch	(Bulgaria) Viktoriya Tomova	7–6^{(7–3)}, 6–7^{(4–7)}, 6–0
⬆️ WTA 125 event ⬆️
2019–2021 not held
2018	(Slovakia) Viktória Kužmová	(Russia) Ekaterina Alexandrova	6–3, 4–6, 6–1
2017	(Slovakia) Jana Čepelová	(Montenegro) Danka Kovinić	6–4, 6–3
2016	(Russia) Irina Khromacheva	(Netherlands) Cindy Burger	6–1, 6–2

=== Doubles ===
Year	Champions	Runners-up	Score
2022	(Hungary) Anna Bondár (Belgium) Kimberley Zimmermann	(Czech Republic) Jesika Malečková (Czech Republic) Renata Voráčová	6–3, 2–6, [10–5]
⬆️ WTA 125 event ⬆️
2019–2021 not held
2018	(Romania) Alexandra Cadanțu (Slovakia) Chantal Škamlová	(United States) Kaitlyn Christian (Mexico) Giuliana Olmos	6–1, 6–3
2017	(Colombia) Mariana Duque (Argentina) María Irigoyen	(Serbia) Aleksandra Krunić (Serbia) Nina Stojanović	7–6^{(7–3)}, 7–5
2016	(Netherlands) Cindy Burger (Netherlands) Arantxa Rus	(Hungary) Ágnes Bukta (Czech Republic) Jesika Malečková	6–1, 6–4
