= Cindy Burger (tennis) =

Dutch tennis player

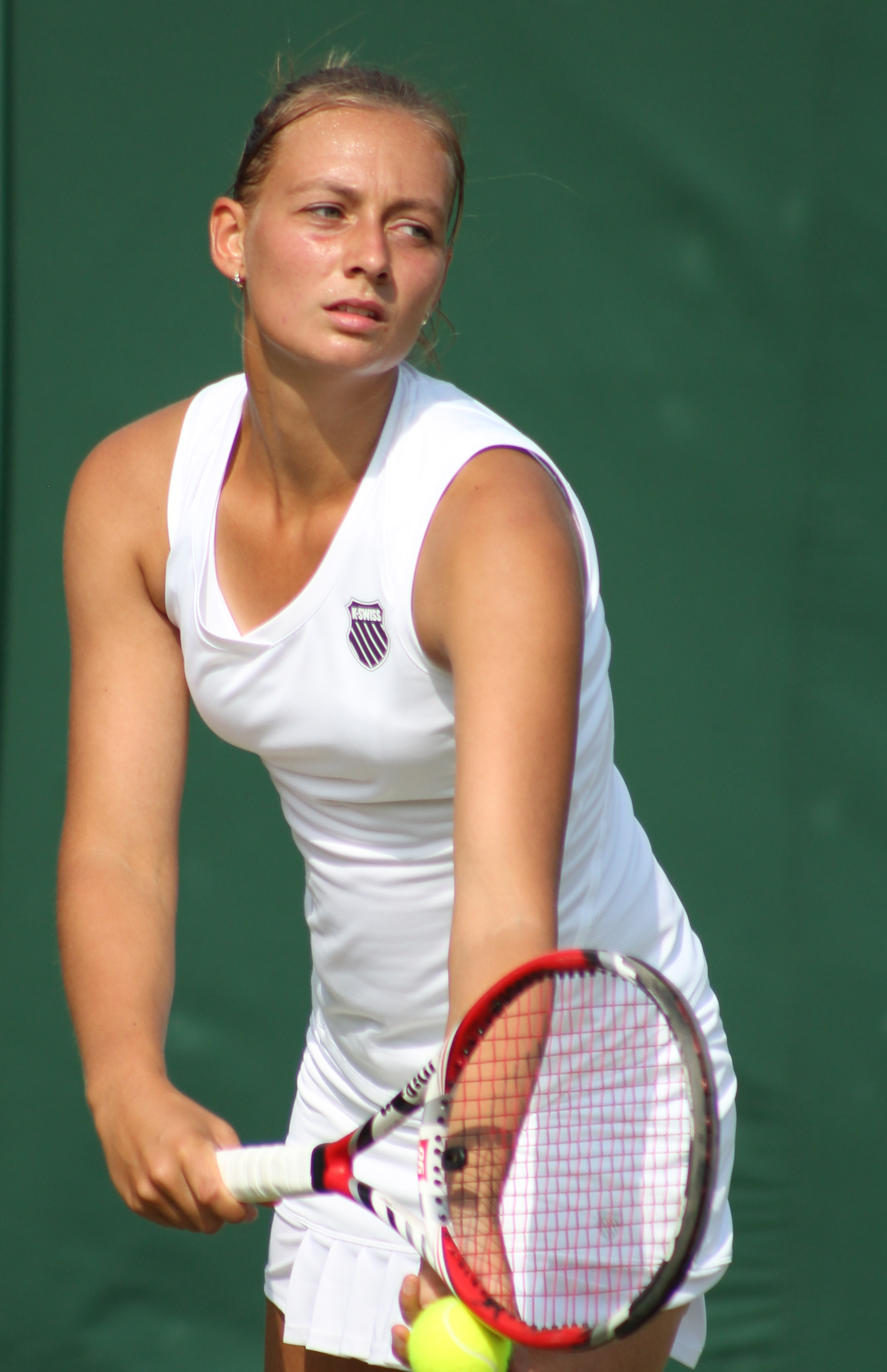
- Burger at the 2015 Wimbledon qualifying
- Country (sports): Netherlands
- Born: 25 November 1992 (age 32); Purmerend, Netherlands
- Height: 1.67 m (5 ft 6 in)
- Turned pro: 2010
- Retired: (last match 2021)
- Plays: Right-handed (two-handed backhand)
- Prize money: $229,474

Singles
- Career record: 295–219
- Career titles: 7 ITF
- Highest ranking: No. 134 (31 October 2016)

Grand Slam singles results
- Australian Open: Q1 (2016)
- French Open: Q2 (2016)
- Wimbledon: Q1 (2015, 2016)
- US Open: Q1 (2014, 2015)

Doubles
- Career record: 83–75
- Career titles: 6 ITF
- Highest ranking: No. 163 (16 January 2017)

Cindy Burger (born 25 November 1992) is a Dutch former professional tennis player.

She has a career-high WTA singles ranking of No. 134, achieved on 31 October 2016. Her highest doubles ranking is 163, which she reached on 16 January 2017. In her career, Burger won seven singles and six doubles titles on the ITF Women's Circuit.

She made her WTA Tour debut at the 2015 Copa Colsanitas where she qualified for the main draw.

Burger made her first WTA Tour quarterfinal at the 2016 Rio Open where she defeated Heidi El Tabakh and Fiona Ferro in qualifying, and Christina McHale with Elitsa Kostova in the main draw. She lost to Francesca Schiavone, after failing to convert a match point.

Playing for the Netherlands in Fed Cup, she has a win-loss record of 0–3.

== ITF Circuit finals ==
=== Singles: 22 (7 titles, 15 runner–ups) ===
Legend $50,000 tournaments $25,000 tournaments $10/15,000 tournaments	Finals by surface Hard (0–1) Clay (7–14)

Result	W–L	Date	Tournament	Tier	Surface	Opponent	Score
Loss	0–1	Aug 2012	ITF Braunschweig, Germany	10,000	Clay	(Germany) Katharina Lehnert	4–6, 6–2, 6–7^{(6)}
Loss	0–2	Sep 2012	ITF Engis, Belgium	10,000	Clay	(Czech Republic) Kateřina Vaňková	2–6, 4–6
Loss	0–3	Apr 2013	ITF San Severo, Italy	10,000	Clay	(Italy) Giulia Sussarello	3–6, 1–6
Loss	0–4	Jun 2013	ITF Amstelveen, Netherlands	10,000	Clay	(Belgium) Ysaline Bonaventure	4–6, 2–6
Loss	0–5	Jul 2013	ITF Horb, Germany	10,000	Clay	(Germany) Carolin Daniels	5–7, 4–6
Win	1–5	Aug 2013	ITF Bucharest, Romania	10,000	Clay	(Romania) Cristina Adamescu	6–4, 6–4
Loss	1–6	Sep 2013	ITF Mamaia, Romania	25,000	Clay	(Romania) Cristina Dinu	7–6^{(5)}, 5–7, 0–6
Loss	1–7	Dec 2013	ITF Bertioga, Brazil	25,000	Hard	(Norway) Ulrikke Eikeri	3–6, 3–6
Win	2–7	Jun 2014	ITF Périgueux, France	25,000	Clay	(Argentina) Florencia Molinero	7–5, 6–1
Loss	2–8	Mar 2015	ITF Le Havre, France	10,000	Clay (i)	(Italy) Alice Matteucci	6–4, 4–6, 6–7^{(3)}
Loss	2–9	May 2015	Nana Trophy, Tunisia	50,000	Clay	(Argentina) María Irigoyen	2–6, 5–7
Loss	2–10	Mar 2016	ITF Curitiba, Brazil	25,000	Clay	(Argentina) Catalina Pella	7–5, 4–6, 2–6
Loss	2–11	Aug 2016	Ladies Open Hechingen, Germany	25,000	Clay	(Slovenia) Dalila Jakupović	3–6, 6–4, 6–7^{(5)}
Loss	2–12	Sep 2016	Hungarian Pro Circuit Open	50,000	Clay	(Russia) Irina Khromacheva	1–6, 2–6
Loss	2–13	Oct 2016	ITF Pula, Italy	25,000	Clay	(Croatia) Tereza Mrdeža	3–6, 4–6
Win	3–13	Apr 2018	Chiasso Open, Switzerland	25,000	Clay	(Romania) Raluca Șerban	6–7^{(4)}, 6–4, 6–3
Loss	3–14	Jun 2018	Bredeney Ladies Open, Germany	25,000	Clay	(Luxembourg) Mandy Minella	5–7, 6–4, 4–6
Win	4–14	Aug 2019	ITF Knokke, Belgium	15,000	Clay	(Russia) Anastasia Pribylova	7–6^{(5)}, 3–6, 6–1
Win	5–14	Aug 2019	ITF Oldenzaal, Netherlands	15,000	Clay	(Turkey) İpek Öz	2–6, 6–1, 6–1
Loss	5–15	Sep 2019	ITF Prague, Czech Republic	25,000	Clay	(Czech Republic) Jesika Malečková	1–6, 2–6
Win	6–15	Jan 2020	ITF Cairo, Egypt	15,000	Clay	(Czech Republic) Anna Sisková	6–1, 7–5
Win	7–15	Aug 2020	ITF Alkmaar, Netherlands	15,000	Clay	(Germany) Noma Noha Akugue	6–1, 6–4

=== Doubles: 15 (6 titles, 9 runner–ups) ===
Legend $100,000 tournaments $50,000 tournaments $25,000 tournaments $10,000 tournaments	Finals by surface Hard (1–1) Clay (5–8)

Result	W–L	Date	Tournament	Tier	Surface	Partner	Opponents	Score
Win	1–0	Mar 2013	ITF Gonesse, France	10,000	Clay (i)	(Chile) Daniela Seguel	(Germany) Anne Schäfer (Czech Republic) Kateřina Vaňková	6–7^{(6)}, 6–3, [10–2]
Loss	1–1	Apr 2013	ITF Šibenik, Croatia	10,000	Clay	(Germany) Anna Klasen	(Czech Republic) Barbora Krejčíková (Russia) Polina Leykina	6–3, 3–6, [10–12]
Win	2–1	May 2013	ITF Båstad, Sweden	10,000	Clay	(Serbia) Milana Špremo	(Belgium) Ysaline Bonaventure (Russia) Maria Mokh	6–1, 6–4
Win	3–1	Sep 2013	TEAN International, Netherlands	25,000	Clay	(Chile) Daniela Seguel	(Netherlands) Demi Schuurs (Netherlands) Eva Wacanno	6–4, 6–1
Loss	3–2	Oct 2013	ITF La Vall d'Uixó, Spain	25,000	Clay	(Netherlands) Arantxa Rus	(Argentina) Florencia Molinero (France) Laura Thorpe	1–6, 4–6
Loss	3–3	May 2014	Maribor Open, Slovenia	25,000	Clay	(Chile) Daniela Seguel	(Czech Republic) Barbora Krejčíková (Czech Republic) Kateřina Siniaková	0–6, 1–6
Win	4–3	Oct 2014	ITF Rock Hill, United States	25,000	Hard	(Canada) Sharon Fichman	(Greece) Despina Papamichail (Austria) Janina Toljan	4–6, 6–1, [10–6]
Loss	4–4	Feb 2015	Open de l'Isère, France	25,000	Hard (i)	(France) Manon Arcangioli	(Japan) Hiroko Kuwata (Netherlands) Demi Schuurs	1–6, 3–6
Loss	4–5	May 2015	Wiesbaden Open, Germany	25,000	Clay	(Ukraine) Veronika Kapshay	(Germany) Carolin Daniels (Switzerland) Viktorija Golubic	4–6, 6–4, [6–10]
Loss	4–6	Jul 2015	ITS Cup, Czech Republic	50,000	Clay	(Czech Republic) Kateřina Vaňková	(Czech Republic) Karolína Stuchlá (Czech Republic) Lenka Kunčíková	6–1, 4–6, [10–12]
Loss	4–7	Jun 2016	Internazionali di Brescia, Italy	50,000	Clay	(Liechtenstein) Stephanie Vogt	(Italy) Deborah Chiesa (Italy) Martina Colmegna	3–6, 6–1, [10–12]
Win	5–7	Jul 2016	Contrexéville Open, France	100,000	Clay	(Spain) Laura Pous Tió	(United States) Nicole Melichar (Czech Republic) Renata Voráčová	6–1, 6–3
Win	6–7	Sep 2016	Hungarian Pro Circuit Open	50,000	Clay	(Netherlands) Arantxa Rus	(Hungary) Ágnes Bukta (Czech Republic) Jesika Malečková	6–1, 6–4
Loss	6–8	Dec 2017	ITF Nules, Spain	25,000	Clay	(Russia) Yana Sizikova	(Ecuador) Charlotte Römer (Spain) Olga Sáez Larra	6–2, 1–6, [7–10]
Loss	6–9	Apr 2018	Chiasso Open, Switzerland	25,000	Clay	(Netherlands) Rosalie van der Hoek	(Croatia) Darija Jurak (Australia) Jessica Moore	6–7^{(6)}, 6–4, [8–10]
