= Jesika Malečková =

Czech tennis player (born 1994)

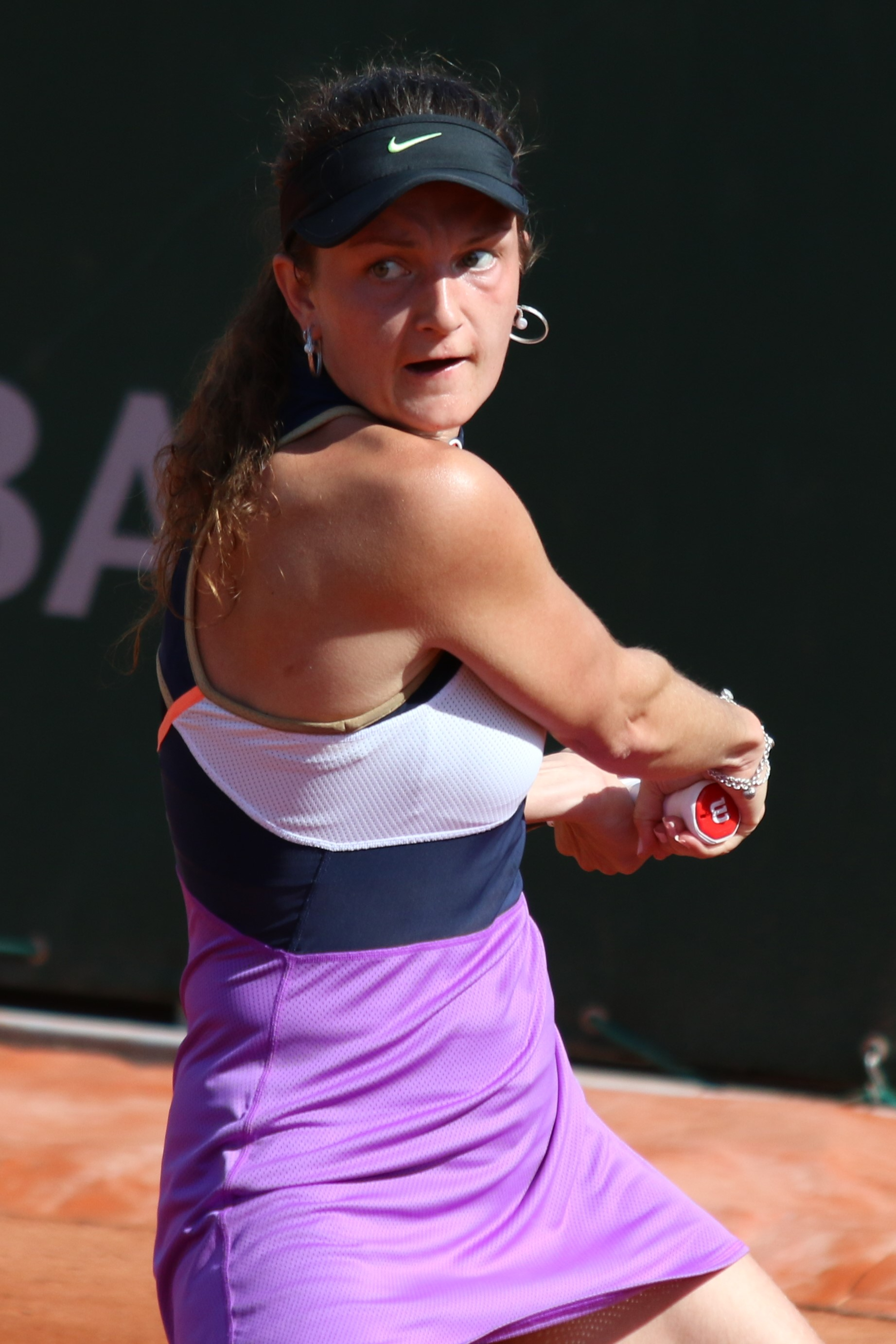
- Malečková at the 2022 French Open
- Country (sports): Czech Republic
- Born: 16 August 1994 (age 32) Beroun, Czech Republic
- Height: 1.69 m (5 ft 7 in)
- Turned pro: 2010
- Plays: Right-handed (two-handed backhand)
- Prize money: US$ 542,699

Singles
- Career record: 362–256
- Career titles: 0 WTA, 11 ITF
- Highest ranking: No. 191 (20 June 2016)

Grand Slam singles results
- Australian Open: Q1 (2022)
- French Open: Q1 (2016, 2022)
- Wimbledon: Q1 (2022)
- US Open: Q1 (2016, 2022)

Doubles
- Career record: 300–182
- Career titles: 1 WTA, 6 WTA 125
- Highest ranking: No. 47 (20 April 2026)
- Current ranking: No. 55 (12 October 2026)

Grand Slam doubles results
- Australian Open: 2R (2026)
- French Open: 1R (2026)
- Wimbledon: 2R (2026)
- US Open: 1R (2026)
- Last updated on: 12 October 2026.

Jesika Malečková (born 16 August 1994) is a Czech tennis player.

Malečková has won 11 singles and 24 doubles titles on the ITF Circuit. On 20 June 2016, she reached her best singles ranking of world No. 191. On 20 April 2026, she peaked at No. 47 in the doubles rankings.

In April 2016, Malečková made her WTA Tour main-draw debut at the 2016 Katowice Open where she received entry as a lucky loser. In qualifying, she had defeated Mandy Minella and Renata Voráčová, falling short in the final round to Isabella Shinikova. In the main draw, she lost to seventh seed Tímea Babos in round one.

== Career ==
In September 2022, she reached her first WTA Challenger final at the Budapest Open, alongside compatriot Renata Voráčová.

In May 2023, at the $60k Prague Open, she won the doubles title alongside Maja Chwalińska. A month later, she won the singles title at a $25k event in Annenheim, Austria. During the grass-court season, she reached another doubles final at the $100k Ilkley Trophy, again with Chwalińska, but they finished runners-up.

== Performance timelines ==
Key
W	F	SF	QF	#R	RR	Q#	DNQ	A	NH

(W) winner; (F) finalist; (SF) semifinalist; (QF) quarterfinalist; (#R) rounds 4, 3, 2, 1; (RR) round-robin stage; (Q#) qualification round; (DNQ) did not qualify; (A) absent; (NH) not held; (SR) strike rate (events won / competed); (W–L) win–loss record.
To avoid confusion and double counting, these charts are updated at the conclusion of a tournament or when the player's participation has ended.

Only main-draw results in WTA Tour, Grand Slam tournaments, Fed Cup/Billie Jean King Cup and Olympic Games are included in win–loss records.

=== Doubles ===
Current through the 2026 Japan Women's Open.

Tournament	2018	2019	2020	2021	2022	2023	2024	2025	2026	SR	W–L	Win %
Grand Slam tournaments
Australian Open	A	A	A	A	A	A	A	A	2R	0 / 1	1–1	50%
French Open	A	A	A	A	A	A	A	A	1R	0 / 1	0–1	0%
Wimbledon	A	A	NH	A	A	A	A	A	2R	0 / 1	1–1	50%
US Open	A	A	A	A	A	A	A	A	1R	0 / 1	0–1	0%
Win–Loss	0–0	0–0	0–0	0–0	0–0	0–0	0–0	0–0	2–4	0 / 4	2–4	33%
WTA 1000 tournaments
Italian Open	A	A	A	A	A	A	A	A	1R	0 / 1	0–1	0%
China Open	A	A	Not Held			A	A	A	1R	0 / 1	0–1	0%
Win–Loss	0–0	0–0	0–0	0–0	0–0	0–0	0–0	0–0	0–2	0 / 2	0–2	0%
Career statistics
Tournaments	1	0	2	1	3	6	2	3	18	Career total: 36		
Titles	0	0	0	0	0	0	0	0	1	Career total: 1		
Finals	0	0	0	0	0	0	0	0	4	Career total: 4		
Overall Win–Loss	0–1	0–0	0–2	1–1	3–3	1–6	0–2	1–3	21–16	1 / 36	27–34	44%
Year-end ranking (Note: 2012: WTA ranking - 471, 2013: WTA ranking - 594, 2014: WTA ranking - n/a, 2015: WTA ranking - 521, 2017: WTA ranking - 286.)	188	448	373	220	110	188	148	74		$542,699		

== WTA Tour finals ==
=== Doubles: 4 (1 title, 3 runner-ups) ===
Legend WTA 500 (0–1) WTA 250 (1–2)	Finals by surface Hard (0–1) Clay (1–1) Grass (0–1)	Finals by setting Outdoor (0–2) Indoor (1–1)

Result	W–L	Date	Tournament	Tier	Surface	Partner	Opponents	Score
Loss	0–1	Apr 2026	Linz Open, Austria	WTA 500	Clay (i)	(Czech Republic) Miriam Škoch	(Romania) Sorana Cîrstea (China) Zhang Shuai	3–6, 2–6
Win	1–1	Apr 2026	Open de Rouen, France	WTA 250	Clay (i)	(Czech Republic) Miriam Škoch	(Chinese Taipei) Liang En-shuo (China) Tang Qianhui	6–2, 7–5
Loss	1–2	Jun 2026	Eastbourne International, UK	WTA 250	Grass	(Czech Republic) Miriam Škoch	(Canada) Gabriela Dabrowski (Brazil) Luisa Stefani	1–6, 4–6
Loss	1–3	Oct 2026	Japan Women's Open, Japan	WTA 250	Hard	(Czech Republic) Miriam Škoch	(Australia) Storm Hunter (Indonesia) Janice Tjen	4–6, 1–6

== WTA 125 finals ==
=== Doubles: 13 (6 titles, 7 runner-ups) ===
Result	W–L	Date	Tournament	Surface	Partner	Opponents	Score
Loss	0–1	Sep 2022	Budapest Ladies Open, Hungary	Clay	(Czech Republic) Renata Voráčová	(Hungary) Anna Bondár (Belgium) Kimberley Zimmermann	3–6, 6–2, [5–10]
Loss	0–2	Mar 2025	Antalya Challenger, Turkey	Clay	(Czech Republic) Miriam Škoch	(Poland) Maja Chwalińska (Czech Republic) Anastasia Dețiuc	6–4, 3–6, [2–10]
Win	1–2	May 2025	Parma Ladies Open, Italy	Clay	(Czech Republic) Miriam Škoch	(China) Tang Qianhui (United States) Sabrina Santamaria	6–2, 6–0
Win	2–2	Jun 2025	Makarska Championships, Croatia	Clay	(Czech Republic) Miriam Škoch	(Georgia (country)) Oksana Kalashnikova; Elena Pridankina	2–6, 6–3, [10–4]
Win	3–2	Jul 2025	Båstad Open, Sweden	Clay	(Czech Republic) Miriam Škoch	(Spain) Irene Burillo Escorihuela (Turkey) Berfu Cengiz	6–4, 6–3
Win	4–2	Sep 2025	Tolentino Open, Italy	Clay	(Czech Republic) Miriam Škoch	(Italy) Silvia Ambrosio (Italy) Nuria Brancaccio	6–3, 3–6, [10–8]
Win	5–2	Oct 2025	Mallorca Championships, Spain	Clay	(Czech Republic) Miriam Škoch	(Germany) Noma Noha Akugue (Germany) Mariella Thamm	6–4, 6–0
Win	6–2	Oct 2025	Internazionali di Rovereto, Italy	Hard (i)	(Czech Republic) Miriam Škoch	(Italy) Silvia Ambrosio (Italy) Aurora Zantedeschi	6–0, 4–6, [10–4]
Loss	6–3	Dec 2025	Open Angers, France	Hard (i)	(Czech Republic) Miriam Škoch	(Germany) Tamara Korpatsch (France) Jessika Ponchet	3–6, 2–6
Loss	6–4	Mar 2026	Antalya Challenger 2, Turkey	Clay	(Czech Republic) Miriam Škoch	(France) Estelle Cascino (Argentina) Nicole Fossa Huergo	5–7, 6–7^{(6–8)}
Loss	6–5	Mar 2026	Antalya Challenger 3, Turkey	Clay	(Poland) Maja Chwalińska	Maria Kozyreva; Iryna Shymanovich	6–7^{(7–9)}, 4–6
Loss	6–6	Mar 2026	Dubrovnik Open, Croatia	Clay	(Czech Republic) Miriam Škoch	(Czech Republic) Anastasia Dețiuc (Czech Republic) Dominika Šalková	5–7, 4–6
Loss	6–7	Aug 2026	Philly Open, United States	Hard	(Czech Republic) Miriam Škoch	(Netherlands) Isabelle Haverlag (Slovenia) Nika Radišić	2–6, 6–1, [7–10]

== ITF Circuit finals ==
=== Singles: 21 (11 titles, 10 runner-ups) ===
Legend $50/60,000 tournaments (0–3) $25,000 tournaments (6–2) $10/15,000 tournaments (5–5)	Finals by surface Hard (3–2) Clay (8–8)

Result	W–L	Date	Tournament	Tier	Surface	Opponent	Score
Loss	0–1	Jul 2014	ITF Horb, Germany	10,000	Clay	(Czech Republic) Petra Krejsová	5–7, 5–7
Win	1–1	Sep 2014	ITF Prague, Czech Republic	10,000	Clay	(Czech Republic) Zuzana Zálabská	6–3, 7–6^{(8–6)}
Loss	1–2	Sep 2014	ITF Hluboká nad Vltavou, Czech Republic	10,000	Clay	(Czech Republic) Lenka Kunčíková	4–6, 3–6
Win	2–2	Oct 2014	ITF Antalya, Turkey	10,000	Hard	(France) Shérazad Reix	6–3, 6–3
Loss	2–3	May 2015	ITF Szczawno-Zdrój, Poland	10,000	Clay	(Czech Republic) Martina Borecká	0–1 ret.
Win	3–3	Jun 2015	ITF Breda, Netherlands	10,000	Clay	(Poland) Sandra Zaniewska	6–3, 5–7, 7–5
Win	4–3	Aug 2015	ITF Horb, Germany	10,000	Clay	(France) Shérazad Reix	1–6, 6–4, 6–2
Loss	4–4	Aug 2015	ITF Leipzig, Germany	10,000	Clay	(Ukraine) Valeriya Strakhova	6–7^{(7–9)}, 1–6
Win	5–4	Nov 2015	ITF Bratislava, Slovakia	25,000	Hard (i)	(Ukraine) Anhelina Kalinina	4–6, 7–6^{(7–3)}, 6–4
Loss	5–5	Jan 2016	ITF Wesley Chapel, United States	25,000	Clay	(United States) Sofia Kenin	2–6, 2–6
Loss	5–6	Jun 2016	Internazionali di Brescia, Italy	50,000	Clay	(Italy) Karin Knapp	1–6, 2–6
Loss	5–7	Nov 2016	Toronto Challenger, Canada	50,000	Hard (i)	(United States) CiCi Bellis	2–6, 6–1, 3–6
Loss	5–8	Sep 2017	Royal Cup, Montenegro	25,000	Clay	(Russia) Marina Melnikova	2–6, 0–6
Win	6–8	Jan 2018	ITF Stuttgart, Germany	15,000	Hard (i)	(Russia) Ekaterina Kazionova	6–2, 6–0
Win	7–8	Sep 2018	Royal Cup, Montenegro	25,000	Clay	(Croatia) Tena Lukas	6–2, 6–0
Win	8–8	Jul 2019	Olomouc Cup, Czech Republic	W25	Clay	(Turkey) İpek Soylu	6–3, 6–4
Win	9–8	Sep 2019	ITF Prague, Czech Republic	W25	Clay	(Netherlands) Cindy Burger	1–6, 2–6
Loss	9–9	Jan 2020	ITF Monastir, Tunisia	W15	Hard	(Belarus) Yuliya Hatouka	1–6, 2–6
Win	10–9	Sep 2021	ITF Jablonec nad Nisou, Czech Rep.	W25	Clay	(Czech Republic) Aneta Kladivová	6–2, 2–6, 6–2
Loss	10–10	Jun 2022	Macha Lake Open, Czech Republic	W60	Clay	(Czech Republic) Sára Bejlek	4–6, 4–6
Win	11–10	Jun 2023	ITF Annenheim, Austria	W25	Clay	(Romania) Miriam Bulgaru	6–2, 6–0

=== Doubles: 46 (24 titles, 22 runner-ups) ===
Legend W100 tournaments (0–2) W80 tournaments (1–0) W50/60/75 tournaments (11–7) W50 tournaments (0–1) W25 tournaments (6–7) W10/15 tournaments (6–5)	Finals by surface Hard (8–9) Clay (15–12) Grass (0–1) Carpet (1–0)

Result	W–L	Date	Tournament	Tier	Surface	Partner	Opponents	Score
Loss	0–1	Apr 2012	ITF Bol, Croatia	10,000	Clay	(Czech Republic) Tereza Smitková	(Italy) Nicole Clerico (France) Anaïs Laurendon	2–6, 0–6
Win	1–1	Aug 2012	ITF Prague, Czech Republic	25,000	Clay	(Czech Republic) Tereza Smitková	(Russia) Anastasia Pivovarova (Russia) Arina Rodionova	6–1, 6–4
Win	2–1	Sep 2012	ITF Trieste, Italy	10,000	Clay	(Czech Republic) Petra Krejsová	(Italy) Giulia Gabba (Italy) Alice Savoretti	7–6^{(4)}, 6–1
Win	3–1	Nov 2012	ITF Vendryně, Czech Republic	10,000	Hard (i)	(Czech Republic) Kateřina Vaňková	(Czech Republic) Martina Kubičíková (Czech Republic) Tereza Smitková	7–6^{(2)}, 6–2
Win	4–1	Jul 2013	Přerov Cup, Czech Republic	15,000	Clay	(Czech Republic) Petra Krejsová	(Russia) Victoria Kan (Ukraine) Ganna Poznikhirenko	6–1, 4–6, [10–5]
Win	5–1	Sep 2013	ITF Prague, Czech Republic	10,000	Clay	(Czech Republic) Tereza Malíková	(Germany) Jil Nora Engelmann (Austria) Yvonne Neuwirth	6–2, 6–2
Loss	5–2	Jan 2015	ITF Stuttgart, Germany	10,000	Hard (i)	(Czech Republic) Martina Borecká	(Czech Republic) Lenka Kunčíková (Czech Republic) Karolína Stuchlá	2–6, 3–6
Win	6–2	May 2015	ITF Szczawno-Zdrój, Poland	10,000	Clay	(Czech Republic) Martina Borecká	(Czech Republic) Veronika Kolářová (Czech Republic) Petra Rohanová	6–1, 2–6, [10–5]
Loss	6–3	Jun 2015	Přerov Cup, Czech Republic	15,000	Clay	(Czech Republic) Martina Borecká	(Czech Republic) Miriam Kolodziejová (Czech Republic) Markéta Vondroušová	4–6, 1–6
Loss	6–4	Jan 2016	ITF Sunrise, United States	25,000	Clay	(Czech Republic) Kateřina Kramperová	(Czech Republic) Lenka Kunčíková (Czech Republic) Karolína Stuchlá	1–6, 6–7^{(6)}
Loss	6–5	Sep 2016	Budapest Ladies Open, Hungary	50,000	Clay	(Hungary) Ágnes Bukta	(Netherlands) Cindy Burger (Netherlands) Arantxa Rus	1–6, 4–6
Loss	6–6	Jul 2017	Bella Cup Toruń, Poland	25,000	Clay	(Czech Republic) Miriam Kolodziejová	(Belarus) Vera Lapko (Russia) Anna Morgina	2–6, 3–6
Win	7–6	Sep 2017	Royal Cup, Montenegro	25,000	Clay	(Czech Republic) Petra Krejsová	(Slovakia) Tereza Mihalíková (Slovakia) Chantal Škamlová	6–2, 6–3
Win	8–6	Oct 2017	ITF Istanbul, Turkey	25,000	Hard (i)	(Czech Republic) Petra Krejsová	(Turkey) İpek Öz (Russia) Ekaterina Yashina	6–4, 6–3
Loss	8–7	Jan 2018	ITF Stuttgart, Germany	15,000	Hard (i)	(Czech Republic) Petra Krejsová	(Romania) Laura Ioana Andrei (Romania) Raluca Șerban	0–6, 7–6^{(7)}, [5–10]
Loss	8–8	Mar 2018	Open de Seine-et-Marne, France	60,000	Hard (i)	(Czech Republic) Petra Krejsová	(Russia) Anna Kalinskaya (Slovakia) Viktória Kužmová	6–7^{(5)}, 1–6
Win	9–8	Jul 2018	Olomouc Cup, Czech Republic	80,000	Clay	(Czech Republic) Petra Krejsová	(Czech Republic) Lucie Hradecká (Netherlands) Michaëlla Krajicek	6–2, 6–1
Loss	9–9	Aug 2018	ITF Leipzig, Germany	25,000	Clay	(Czech Republic) Petra Krejsová	(Romania) Cristina Dinu (Ukraine) Ganna Poznikhirenko	6–4, 0–6, [5–10]
Loss	9–10	Oct 2018	Open de Touraine, France	25,000	Hard (i)	(Czech Republic) Miriam Kolodziejová	(Poland) Magdalena Fręch (Netherlands) Bibiane Schoofs	7–5, 2–6, [3–10]
Loss	9–11	Jul 2019	Olomouc Cup, Czech Republic	W25	Clay	(Slovakia) Chantal Škamlová	(Czech Republic) Anastasia Dețiuc (Czech Republic) Johana Marková	3–6, 6–4, [9–11]
Win	10–11	Aug 2019	ITF Leipzig, Germany	W25	Clay	(Czech Republic) Petra Krejsová	(Kazakhstan) Anna Danilina (Germany) Vivian Heisen	4–6, 6–3, [10–6]
Loss	10–12	Jan 2020	ITF Monastir, Tunisia	W15	Hard	(Czech Republic) Miriam Kolodziejová	(Italy) Nuria Brancaccio (Italy) Federica Rossi	7–5, 3–6, [5–10]
Loss	10–13	Sep 2020	ITF Frýdek-Místek, Czech Republic	W25	Clay	(Czech Republic) Miriam Kolodziejová	(Czech Republic) Anastasia Dețiuc (Czech Republic) Johana Marková	1–6, 4–6
Win	11–13	Feb 2021	ITF Potchefstroom, South Africa	W25	Hard	(Czech Republic) Miriam Kolodziejová	(Hungary) Anna Bondár (Hungary) Réka Luca Jani	6–2, 3–6, [10–5]
Win	12–13	Sep 2021	Prague Open, Czech Republic	W60	Clay	(Czech Republic) Miriam Kolodziejová	(Japan) Kanako Morisaki (Japan) Erika Sema	6–3, 1–6, [10–2]
Loss	12–14	Oct 2021	ITF Lagos, Portugal	W25	Hard	(Czech Republic) Miriam Kolodziejová	(Latvia) Diāna Marcinkēviča (China) Yuan Yue	w/o
Win	13–14	Feb 2022	ITF Ankara, Turkey	W25	Clay	(Czech Republic) Miriam Kolodziejová	(Japan) Funa Kozaki (Japan) Naho Sato	7–6^{(2)}, 7–6^{(4)}
Win	14–14	Mar 2022	ITF Ankara, Turkey	W15	Clay	(Czech Republic) Miriam Kolodziejová	(Greece) Sapfo Sakellaridi (Russia) Anastasia Zolotareva	6–2, 6–4
Win	15–14	Apr 2022	Edge Istanbul, Turkey	W60	Clay	(Poland) Maja Chwalińska	(Russia) Anastasia Tikhonova (Turkey) Berfu Cengiz	2–6, 6–4, [10–7]
Loss	15–15	May 2022	Prague Open, Czech Republic	W60	Clay	(Czech Republic) Miriam Kolodziejová	(Chile) Bárbara Gatica (Brazil) Rebeca Pereira	4–6, 2–6
Win	16–15	Jun 2022	Brașov Open, Romania	W60	Clay	(Bulgaria) Isabella Shinikova	(Slovenia) Veronika Erjavec (Poland) Weronika Falkowska	7–6^{(5)}, 6–3
Win	17–15	Oct 2022	Hamburg Ladies & Gents Cup, Germany	W60	Hard (i)	(Czech Republic) Miriam Kolodziejová	(Slovenia) Veronika Erjavec (Norway) Malene Helgø	6–4, 6–2
Win	18–15	Nov 2022	Bratislava Open, Slovakia	W60	Hard (i)	(Czech Republic) Renata Voráčová	(Slovakia) Katarína Kužmová (Slovakia) Viktória Kužmová	2–6, 7–5, [13–11]
Loss	18–16	Apr 2023	Oeiras Open, Portugal	W60	Clay	(Czech Republic) Renata Voráčová	(Brazil) Ingrid Martins (Mexico) Fernanda Contreras Gómez	3–6, 2–6
Win	19–16	May 2023	Prague Open, Czech Republic	W60	Clay	(Poland) Maja Chwalińska	(Czech Republic) Aneta Kučmová (Australia) Kaylah Mcphee	6–0, 7–6^{(5)}
Loss	19–17	Jun 2023	Ilkley Trophy, United Kingdom	W100	Grass	(Poland) Maja Chwalińska	(Serbia) Natalija Stevanović (Japan) Nao Hibino	6–7^{(10)}, 6–7^{(5)}
Win	20–17	Oct 2023	Bratislava Open, Slovakia	W60	Hard (i)	(France) Estelle Cascino	(Czech Republic) Denisa Hindová (Czech Republic) Karolína Kubáňová	6–3, 6–2
Loss	20–18	Dec 2023	Trnava Indoor, Slovakia	W60	Hard (i)	(France) Estelle Cascino	(Slovakia) Natália Kročková (Slovakia) Tereza Mihalíková	6–7^{(7)}, 5–7
Win	21–18	Feb 2024	AK Ladies Open, Germany	W75	Carpet (i)	(Poland) Maja Chwalińska	(Germany) Julia Lohoff (Switzerland) Conny Perrin	6–4, 7–5
Loss	21–19	Mar 2024	ITF Murska Sobota, Slovenia	W50	Hard	(Uzbekistan) Nigina Abduraimova	(Portugal) Francisca Jorge (United States) Anna Rogers	4–6, 7–5, [8–10]
Win	22–19	Apr 2024	Bellinzona Ladies Open, Switzerland	W75	Clay	(Switzerland) Conny Perrin	(United States) Carmen Corley (United States) Ivana Corley	6–7^{(4)}, 7–6^{(7)}, [10–7]
Loss	22–20	Aug 2024	Ladies Open Amstetten, Austria	W75	Clay	(Czech Republic) Miriam Škoch	(Spain) Yvonne Cavallé Reimers (Netherlands) Eva Vedder	3–6, 2–6
Loss	22–21	Nov 2024	Pétange Open, Luxembourg	W75	Hard (i)	(Czech Republic) Miriam Škoch	Alevtina Ibragimova (Netherlands) Lian Tran	6–1, 2–6, [9–11]
Win	23–21	Feb 2025	Prague Open, Czech Republic	W75	Hard (i)	(Czech Republic) Miriam Škoch	(Australia) Priscilla Hon (Switzerland) Rebeka Masarova	6–0, 6–2
Win	24–21	Feb 2025	Trnava Indoor, Slovakia	W75	Hard (i)	(Czech Republic) Miriam Škoch	(Switzerland) Céline Naef; Elena Pridankina	5–7, 6–3, [10–2]
Loss	24–22	Apr 2025	Wiesbaden Open, Germany	W100	Clay	(Czech Republic) Miriam Škoch	(Kazakhstan) Zhibek Kulambayeva (Latvia) Darja Semeņistaja	6–4, 3–6, [9–11]
