= Chantal Škamlová =

Slovak tennis player

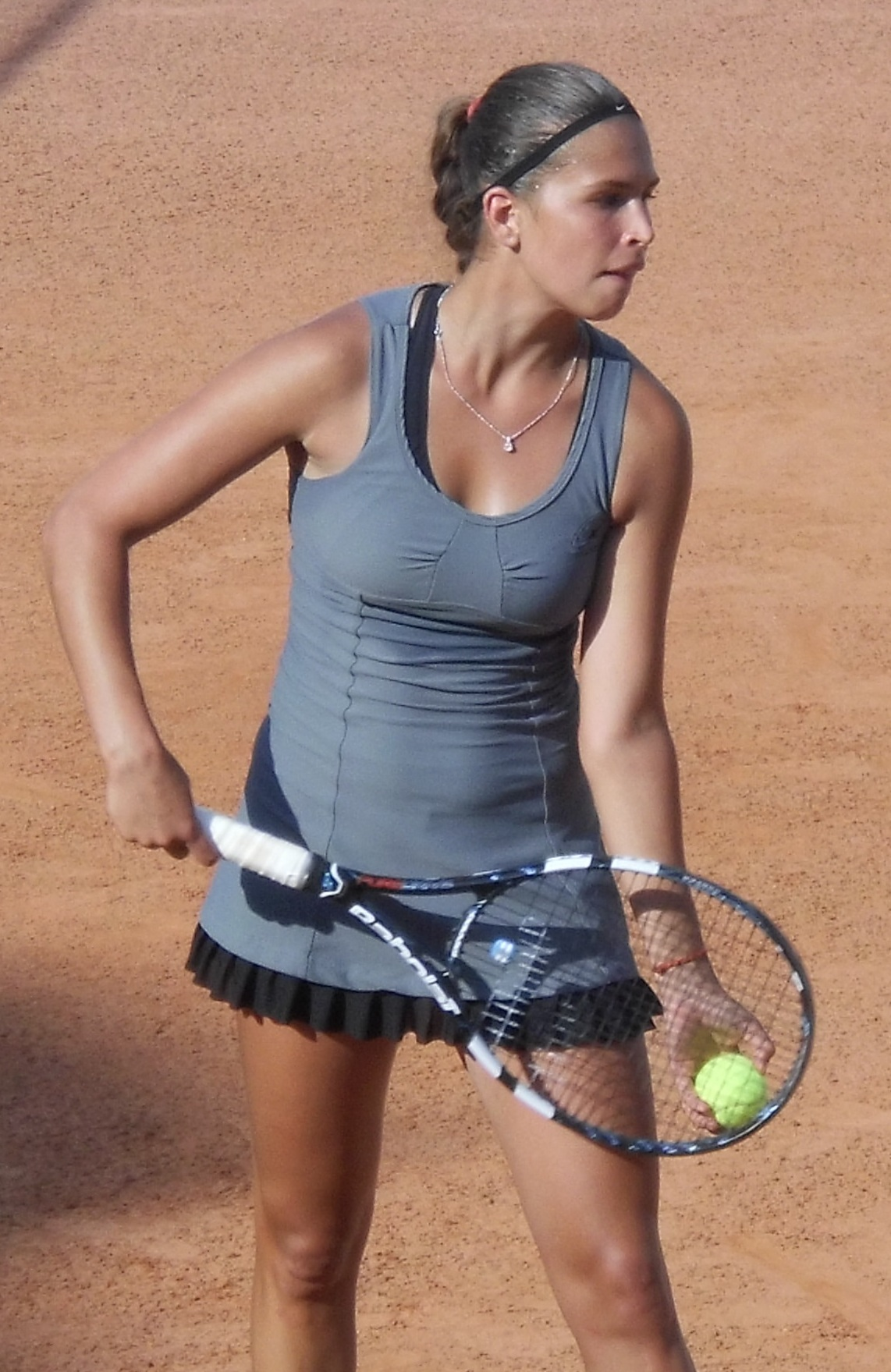
- Škamlová at the 2014 Bella Cup in Poland
- Country (sports): Slovakia
- Residence: Banská Bystrica, Slovakia
- Born: 4 September 1993 (age 32) Banská Bystrica
- Height: 1.69 m (5 ft 7 in)
- Plays: Right-handed (two-handed backhand)
- Prize money: US$ 178,373

Singles
- Career record: 336–226
- Career titles: 12 ITF
- Highest ranking: No. 218 (14 August 2017)

Doubles
- Career record: 304–163
- Career titles: 40 ITF
- Highest ranking: No. 116 (7 January 2019)

Chantal Škamlová (Slovak pronunciation: [ˈʂantal ˈʂkamlɔʋaː]; born 4 September 1993) is a Slovak former tennis player.

== Junior career ==
Škamlová won the girls' doubles event at the 2010 Australian Open, partnering with Jana Čepelová, defeating Tímea Babos and Gabriela Dabrowski in the final.

=== Junior Grand Slam performance ===
Singles:

- Australian Open: 1R (2010)
- French Open: 3R (2010)
- Wimbledon: 1R (2009, 2010, 2011)
- US Open: 1R (2010)

Doubles:

- Australian Open: W (2010)
- French Open: QF (2011)
- Wimbledon: QF (2010)
- US Open: SF (2009)

== Professional ==
In her career, Škamlová won 12 singles titles and 40 doubles titles on the ITF Women's Circuit. In August 2017, she reached her best singles ranking of world No. 218. On 7 January 2019, she peaked at No. 116 in the WTA doubles rankings.

== ITF finals ==
=== Singles: 26 (12 titles, 14 runner–ups) ===
Legend $25,000 tournaments $10/15,000 tournaments	Finals by surface Hard (3–2) Clay (9–12)

Result	W–L	Date	Tournament	Tier	Surface	Opponent	Score
Loss	0–1	Jul 2010	ITF Piešťany, Slovakia	10,000	Clay	(Czech Republic) Zuzana Zálabská	6–3, 3–6, 0–6
Win	1–1	May 2012	ITF Warsaw, Poland	10,000	Clay	(Poland) Katarzyna Kawa	6–3, 6–2
Win	2–1	Jun 2012	ITF Erzincan, Turkey	10,000	Hard	(Austria) Jeannine Prentner	6–1, 6–1
Loss	2–2	Jun 2012	ITF Prokuplje, Serbia	10,000	Clay	(Croatia) Ana Savić	2–6, 4–6
Loss	2–3	Mar 2013	ITF Antalya, Turkey	10,000	Hard	(Sweden) Ellen Allgurin	0–6, 6–3, 2–6
Loss	2–4	Jun 2013	Bredeney Ladies Open, Germany	10,000	Clay	(Slovakia) Michaela Hončová	2–6, 2–6
Win	3–4	Sep 2013	ITF Antalya, Turkey	10,000	Hard	(Czech Republic) Kateřina Kramperová	7–5, 6–3
Win	4–4	May 2014	ITF Sousse, Tunisia	10,000	Hard	(France) Lou Brouleau	7–6^{(3)}, 4–6, 6–4
Loss	4–5	Dec 2014	ITF Antalya, Turkey	10,000	Clay	(Norway) Melanie Stokke	5–7, 4–6
Loss	4–6	Jun 2015	ITF Niš, Serbia	10,000	Clay	(Serbia) Milana Spremo	2–6, 4–6
Loss	4–7	Aug 2015	ITF Arad, Romania	10,000	Clay	(Slovenia) Tamara Zidanšek	1–6, 3–6
Win	5–7	Aug 2015	ITF Vinkovci, Croatia	10,000	Clay	(Serbia) Dejana Radanović	4–6, 6–3, 7–5
Loss	5–8	Sep 2015	ITF Antalya, Turkey	10,000	Hard	(Russia) Marta Paigina	6–7^{(3)}, 3–6
Win	6–8	Jan 2016	ITF Cairo, Egypt	10,000	Clay	(Egypt) Sandra Samir	6–1, 4–6, 7–6^{(3)}
Win	7–8	Jan 2016	ITF Cairo, Egypt	10,000	Clay	(Egypt) Sandra Samir	6–4, 6–1
Loss	7–9	Jan 2016	ITF Cairo, Egypt	10,000	Clay	(Kazakhstan) Kamila Kerimbayeva	4–6, 6–4, 1–6
Win	8–9	Feb 2016	ITF Hammamet, Tunisia	10,000	Clay	(Greece) Despina Papamichail	6–1, 4–6, 6–3
Win	9–9	Aug 2016	ITF Arad, Romania	10,000	Clay	(Romania) Laura Ioana Andrei	6–2, 3–6, 6–4
Win	10–9	Feb 2017	ITF Cairo, Egypt	15,000	Clay	(Switzerland) Jil Teichmann	3–6, 7–6^{(1)}, 6–1
Loss	10–10	Jun 2017	ITF Baja, Hungary	25,000	Clay	(Norway) Ulrikke Eikeri	6–7^{(4)}, 2–6
Win	11–10	Jul 2017	Bella Cup, Poland	25,000	Clay	(Czech Republic) Miriam Kolodziejová	6–2, 4–6, 6–3
Loss	11–11	Mar 2019	ITF Tabarka, Tunisia	15,000	Clay	(Sweden) Mirjam Björklund	3–6, 2–6
Loss	11–12	Jun 2019	ITF Budapest, Hungary	15,000	Clay	(Hungary) Vanda Lukács	3–6, 6–2, 3–6
Loss	11–13	Jan 2020	ITF Cairo, Egypt	15,000	Clay	(France) Lucie Wargnier	1–6, 6–2, 3–6
Loss	11–14	Jan 2021	ITF Cairo, Egypt	15,000	Clay	(Spain) Jéssica Bouzas Maneiro	6–2, 5–7, 3–6
Win	12–14	Jan 2021	ITF Cairo, Egypt	15,000	Clay	(United States) Anastasia Nefedova	6–4, 5–7, 6–4

=== Doubles: 65 (40 titles, 25 runner–ups) ===
Legend $100,000 tournaments $60,000 tournaments $25,000 tournaments $10/15,000 tournaments	Finals by surface Hard (9–10) Clay (30–15) Carpet (1–0)

Result	W–L	Date	Tournament	Tier	Surface	Partner	Opponents	Score
Loss	0–1	Apr 2010	ITF Bol, Croatia	10,000	Clay	(Slovakia) Romana Tabak	(Romania) Alexandra Cadanțu (Romania) Alexandra Damaschin	2–6, 6–1, [5–10]
Loss	0–2	Jun 2010	ITF Bratislava, Slovakia	25,000	Clay	(Canada) Gabriela Dabrowski	(Slovakia) Katarína Kachlíková (Slovakia) Lenka Tvarošková	4–6, 6–7^{(2)}
Loss	0–3	Oct 2010	ITF Antalya, Turkey	10,000	Clay	(Czech Republic) Monika Tůmová	(Russia) Viktoria Kamenskaya (Belarus) Anna Orlik	6–7^{(7)}, 4–6
Win	1–3	Oct 2010	ITF Antalya, Turkey	10,000	Clay	(Slovakia) Nikola Vajdová	(Turkey) Başak Eraydın (Italy) Camilla Rosatello	6–1, 6–3
Loss	1–4	Mar 2012	ITF Antalya, Turkey	10,000	Clay	(Slovakia) Anna Karolína Schmiedlová	(United States) Anamika Bhargava (United States) Sylvia Krywacz	6–4, 4–6, [3–10]
Win	2–4	Jun 2012	ITF Ağrı, Turkey	10,000	Carpet	(Russia) Alexandra Romanova	(Australia) Abbie Myers (Russia) Yana Sizikova	6–3, 4–6, [10–7]
Win	3–4	Jun 2012	ITF Erzincan, Turkey	10,000	Hard	(Germany) Alina Wessel	(Austria) Jeannine Prentner (Russia) Evgeniya Svintsova	6–0, 6–4
Win	4–4	Oct 2012	ITF Solin, Croatia	10,000	Clay	(Slovakia) Lenka Juríková	(Czech Republic) Denisa Allertová (Belgium) Michaela Boev	7–5, 6–4
Loss	4–5	Nov 2012	ITF Edgbaston, England	10,000	Hard (i)	(Czech Republic) Martina Kubičíková	(United Kingdom) Anna Fitzpatrick (United Kingdom) Jade Windley	2–6, 3–6
Loss	4–6	Feb 2013	ITF Sharm El Sheikh, Egypt	10,000	Hard	(Czech Republic) Martina Kubičíková	(Serbia) Doroteja Erić (Austria) Barbara Haas	2–6, 5–7
Loss	4–7	Feb 2013	ITF Antalya, Turkey	10,000	Clay	(Slovakia) Lenka Juríková	(Italy) Gioia Barbieri (Germany) Anne Schäfer	6–4, 3–6, [4–10]
Loss	4–8	Jul 2013	ITF Rovereto, Italy	15,000	Clay	(Ukraine) Olga Ianchuk	(Italy) Martina Caregaro (Italy) Anna Floris	6–3, 4–6, [6–10]
Loss	4–9	Sep 2013	ITF Antalya, Turkey	10,000	Hard	(Austria) Marlies Szupper	(Germany) Michaela Frlicka (Czech Republic) Kateřina Kramperová	3–6, 6–7^{(4)}
Loss	4–10	Sep 2013	ITF Antalya, Turkey	10,000	Hard	(Philippines) Katharina Lehnert	(Israel) Deniz Khazaniuk (Kyrgyzstan) Ksenia Palkina	7–6^{(5)}, 6–7^{(3)}, [8–10]
Win	5–10	Nov 2013	ITF Astana, Kazakhstan	10,000	Hard (i)	(Uzbekistan) Albina Khabibulina	(Kazakhstan) Asiya Dair (Russia) Ivanka Karamalak	6–2, 6–3
Loss	5–11	Mar 2014	ITF Antalya, Turkey	10,000	Hard	(Serbia) Natalija Kostić	(Georgia (country)) Ekaterine Gorgodze (Georgia (country)) Sofia Kvatsabaia	6–4, 1–6, [8–10]
Win	6–11	Mar 2014	ITF Antalya, Turkey	10,000	Hard	(Czech Republic) Denisa Allertová	(Turkey) Melis Sezer (Turkey) İpek Soylu	6–2, 6–1
Win	7–11	May 2014	ITF Sousse, Tunisia	10,000	Hard	(Russia) Avgusta Tsybysheva	(Spain) Olga Parres Azcoitia (Spain) Nuria Párrizas Díaz	6–3, 6–2
Loss	7–12	May 2014	ITF Sousse, Tunisia	10,000	Hard	(Mexico) Ana Sofía Sánchez	(Australia) Alexandra Nancarrow (Spain) Olga Parres Azcoitia	4–6, 2–6
Win	8–12	Jun 2014	ITF Přerov, Czech Republic	15,000	Clay	(Czech Republic) Barbora Štefková	(Czech Republic) Eva Rutarová (Czech Republic) Karolína Stuchlá	6–4, 6–3
Win	9–12	Jun 2014	ITF Siófok, Hungary	25,000	Clay	(Czech Republic) Denisa Allertová	(Czech Republic) Martina Borecká (Czech Republic) Petra Krejsová	6–1, 6–3
Loss	9–13	Jun 2014	Bella Cup, Poland	25,000	Clay	(Sweden) Hilda Melander	(Czech Republic) Martina Borecká (Czech Republic) Martina Kubičíková	6–7^{(4)}, 2–6
Win	10–13	Sep 2014	ITF Sankt Pölten, Austria	10,000	Clay	(Slovakia) Karin Morgošová	(Russia) Vera Aleshcheva (Netherlands) Jade Schoelink	6–3, 6–1
Win	11–13	Sep 2014	ITF Monterrey, Mexico	25,000	Hard	(Slovenia) Nastja Kolar	(Argentina) Florencia Molinero (Georgia (country)) Sofia Shapatava	6–3, 2–6, [10–5]
Loss	11–14	Nov 2014	ITF Antalya, Turkey	10,000	Clay	(Serbia) Natalija Kostić	(Ukraine) Alona Fomina (Georgia (country)) Ekaterine Gorgodze	w/o
Win	12–14	Dec 2014	ITF Antalya, Turkey	10,000	Clay	(Georgia (country)) Sofia Kvatsabaia	(Georgia (country)) Ekaterine Gorgodze (Slovenia) Nastja Kolar	w/o
Win	13–14	Jan 2015	ITF Port El Kantaoui, Tunisia	10,000	Hard	(Bulgaria) Isabella Shinikova	(Croatia) Silvia Njirić (Spain) Olga Parres Azcoitia	6–2, 6–0
Win	14–14	Apr 2015	ITF Antalya, Turkey	10,000	Hard	(Ukraine) Alona Fomina	(Russia) Ksenia Gaydarzhi (Australia) Sara Tomic	6–2, 6–1
Loss	14–15	Apr 2015	ITF Antalya, Turkey	10,000	Hard	(Slovakia) Vivien Juhászová	(United States) Veronica Corning (Venezuela) Aymet Uzcátegui	6–2, 5–7, [4–10]
Win	15–15	Aug 2015	ITF Vrnjačka Banja, Serbia	10,000	Clay	(North Macedonia) Lina Gjorcheska	(Serbia) Marina Lazić (Serbia) Bojana Marinković	6–4, 6–0
Win	16–15	Sep 2015	ITF Antalya, Turkey	10,000	Hard	(South Africa) Ilze Hattingh	(Poland) Agata Barańska (China) Wang Yan	7–6^{(3)}, 3–6, [10–2]
Loss	16–16	Nov 2015	ITF Bratislava, Slovakia	25,000	Hard (i)	(Slovakia) Michaela Hončová	(Slovenia) Dalila Jakupović (Germany) Anne Schäfer	7–6^{(5)}, 2–6, [8–10]
Win	17–16	Jan 2016	ITF Cairo, Egypt	10,000	Clay	(Czech Republic) Petra Krejsová	(Egypt) Ola Abou Zekry (Greece) Despina Papamichail	6–4, 6–0
Win	18–16	Jan 2016	ITF Cairo, Egypt	10,000	Clay	(Czech Republic) Petra Krejsová	(India) Riya Bhatia (India) Eetee Maheta	6–3, 6–2
Win	19–16	Jan 2016	ITF Cairo, Egypt	10,000	Clay	(Czech Republic) Petra Krejsová	(Egypt) Ola Abou Zekry (Greece) Despina Papamichail	7–6^{(2)}, 6–3
Win	20–16	Feb 2016	ITF Trnava, Slovakia	10,000	Hard (i)	(Hungary) Réka Luca Jani	(Slovakia) Lenka Juríková (Czech Republic) Tereza Malíková	6–3, 2–6, [10–7]
Loss	20–17	Feb 2016	ITF Hammamet, Tunisia	10,000	Clay	(Greece) Despina Papamichail	(Canada) Petra Januskova (Belarus) Sviatlana Pirazhenka	3–6, 2–6
Win	21–17	Feb 2016	ITF Hammamet, Tunisia	10,000	Clay	(Greece) Despina Papamichail	(Canada) Petra Januskova (Belarus) Sviatlana Pirazhenka	6–2, 6–7^{(5)}, [10–5]
Loss	21–18	Mar 2016	ITF Antalya, Turkey	10,000	Hard	(Slovakia) Michaela Hončová	(Hungary) Ágnes Bukta (Slovakia) Vivien Juhászová	4–6, 1–6
Loss	21–19	May 2016	ITF Győr, Hungary	25,000	Clay	(Hungary) Vanda Lukács	(Hungary) Réka Luca Jani (Croatia) Ana Vrljić	4–6, 3–6
Win	22–19	Jun 2016	ITF Périgueux, France	25,000	Clay	(Switzerland) Conny Perrin	(Argentina) Julieta Estable (Argentina) Guadalupe Pérez Rojas	6–3, 3–6, [10–7]
Win	23–19	Aug 2016	ITF Arad, Romania	10,000	Clay	(Turkey) Ayla Aksu	(Turkey) Yasmin Gülman (Romania) Camelia Hristea	6–4, 6–2
Win	24–19	Aug 2016	ITF Slovenská Ľupča, Slovakia	10,000	Clay	(Czech Republic) Petra Krejsová	(Slovakia) Barbara Kötelesová (Slovakia) Viktória Kužmová	6–2, 6–1
Win	25–19	Sep 2016	ITF Hódmezővásárhely, Hungary	25,000	Clay	(Switzerland) Conny Perrin	(Romania) Irina Bara (Romania) Elena Bogdan	6–4, 6–2
Win	26–19	Jan 2017	ITF Cairo, Egypt	15,000	Clay	(Japan) Ayaka Okuno	(Oman) Fatma Al-Nabhani (Egypt) Sandra Samir	4–6, 6–4, [10–6]
Win	27–19	Jan 2017	ITF Cairo, Egypt	15,000	Clay	(Japan) Ayaka Okuno	(Oman) Fatma Al-Nabhani (Egypt) Sandra Samir	6–3, 6–1
Win	28–19	Mar 2017	ITF Hammamet, Tunisia	15,000	Clay	(Bulgaria) Isabella Shinikova	(Russia) Margarita Lazareva (Russia) Maria Marfutina	7–6^{(5)}, 4–6, [10–8]
Win	29–19	Jun 2017	ITF Baja, Hungary	25,000	Clay	(Germany) Anna Zaja	(Hungary) Ágnes Bukta (Slovakia) Vivien Juhászová	6–7^{(5)}, 6–1, [11–9]
Win	30–19	Sep 2017	Ladies Open Dunakeszi, Hungary	60,000	Clay	(Romania) Irina Bara	(Romania) Alexandra Cadanțu (Czech Republic) Tereza Smitková	7–6^{(7)}, 6–4
Loss	30–20	Sep 2017	Royal Cup, Montenegro	25,000	Clay	(Slovakia) Tereza Mihalíková	(Czech Republic) Petra Krejsová (Czech Republic) Jesika Malečková	4–6, 3–6
Win	31–20	Mar 2018	ITF Pula, Italy	25,000	Clay	(Netherlands) Eva Wacanno	(Georgia (country)) Sofia Shapatava (Ukraine) Anastasiya Vasylyeva	6–1, 5–7, [10–6]
Loss	31–21	Apr 2018	ITF Pula, Italy	25,000	Clay	(France) Manon Arcangioli	(Russia) Valeriya Solovyeva (Germany) Anna Zaja	5–7, 3–6
Win	32–21	Apr 2018	ITF Pula, Italy	25,000	Clay	(Netherlands) Bibiane Schoofs	(United States) Chiara Scholl (Bosnia and Herzegovina) Jelena Simić	6–2, 3–6, [10–7]
Win	33–21	Jul 2018	Hungarian Pro Ladies Open	100,000	Clay	(Romania) Alexandra Cadanțu	(United States) Kaitlyn Christian (Mexico) Giuliana Olmos	6–1, 6–3
Win	34–21	Aug 2018	Ladies Open Hechingen, Germany	60,000	Clay	(Russia) Polina Monova	(Kyrgyzstan) Ksenia Palkina (Georgia (country)) Sofia Shapatava	6–4, 6–3
Loss	34–22	Nov 2018	ITF Pétange, Luxembourg	25,000	Hard (i)	(Poland) Katarzyna Piter	(Russia) Anastasia Pribylova (Serbia) Nina Stojanović	6–2, 2–6, [8–10]
Loss	34–23	Mar 2019	ITF Tabarka, Tunisia	15,000	Clay	(Romania) Oana Georgeta Simion	(Romania) Oana Gavrilă (Italy) Martina Spigarelli	5–7, 6–3, [8–10]
Loss	34–24	Jul 2019	ITS Cup Olomouc, Czech Republic	25,000	Clay	(Czech Republic) Jesika Malečková	(Czech Republic) Anastasia Dețiuc (Czech Republic) Johana Marková	3–6, 6–4, [9–11]
Win	35–24	Sep 2019	ITF Brno, Czech Republic	25,000	Clay	(Ukraine) Maryna Chernyshova	(Poland) Anna Hertel (Slovakia) Vivien Juhászová	6–7^{(4)}, 6–4, [10–4]
Win	36–24	Jan 2020	ITF Cairo, Egypt	15,000	Clay	(Belgium) Hélène Scholsen	(Russia) Sofia Dmitrieva (Russia) Viktoriia Kalinina	6–0, 6–4
Win	37–24	Jan 2020	ITF Cairo, Egypt	15,000	Clay	(Belgium) Hélène Scholsen	(Kazakhstan) Kamila Kerimbayeva (Moldova) Vitalia Stamat	6–7^{(4)}, 6–1, [10–7]
Loss	37–25	Mar 2020	ITF Heraklion, Greece	15,000	Clay	(Czech Republic) Miriam Kolodziejová	(Romania) Oana Gavrilă (Romania) Andreea Roșca	3–6, 6–4, [7–10]
Win	38–25	Sep 2020	Zubr Cup, Czech Republic	25,000	Clay	(Czech Republic) Tereza Smitková	(Romania) Nicoleta Dascălu (Cyprus) Raluca Șerban	7–6^{(5)}, 7–6^{(4)}
Win	39–25	Feb 2021	ITF Antalya, Turkey	15,000	Clay	(Romania) Cristina Dinu	(Colombia) María Herazo González (Colombia) Yuliana Lizarazo	6–1, 6–3
Win	40–25	Aug 2021	ITF Bratislava, Slovakia	15,000	Clay	(Slovakia) Radka Zelníčková	(Slovenia) Pia Lovrič (Hungary) Adrienn Nagy	6–3, 7–6^{(5)}

== Junior Grand Slam finals ==
=== Girls' doubles: 1 (title) ===
Result	Year	Tournament	Surface	Partner	Opponents	Score
Win	2010	Australian Open	Hard	(Slovakia) Jana Čepelová	(Hungary) Tímea Babos (Canada) Gabriela Dabrowski	7–6^{(1)}, 6–2
