= Ágnes Bukta =

Hungarian tennis player

- Country (sports): Hungary
- Born: 29 October 1993 (age 32) Szolnok, Hungary
- Plays: Right (two-handed backhand)
- Prize money: $99,439

Singles
- Career record: 229–159
- Career titles: 8 ITF
- Highest ranking: No. 294 (16 October 2016)

Doubles
- Career record: 172–105
- Career titles: 20 ITF
- Highest ranking: No. 209 (1 May 2017)

Ágnes Bukta (born 29 October 1993) is a Hungarian former professional tennis player.

In her career, she won eight singles titles and 20 doubles titles on the ITF Women's Circuit. On 16 October 2016, she reached her best singles ranking of world No. 294. On 1 May 2017, she peaked at No. 209 in the WTA doubles rankings.

Playing for the Hungary Fed Cup team, she has a win-loss record of 2–0.

Bukta was given a wildcard for the 2013 Budapest Grand Prix where she made her WTA Tour main-draw debut in July 2013. She defeated Sandra Záhlavová in the first round in a third-set tiebreak only to be beaten in straight sets by eventual champion Simona Halep in round two.

== ITF Circuit finals ==
=== Singles: 13 (8–5) ===
Legend $10,000 tournaments	Finals by surface Clay (8–5)

Result	No.	Date	Tier	Tournament	Surface	Opponent	Score
Win	1.	12 November 2012	10,000	ITF Antalya, Turkey	Clay	(Romania) Laura Ioana Andrei	6–2, 5–7, 6–3
Win	2.	8 April 2013	10,000	ITF Bol, Croatia	Clay	(United States) Bernarda Pera	5–7, 6–2, 7–5
Win	3.	15 April 2013	10,000	ITF Šibenik, Croatia	Clay	(Czech Republic) Barbora Krejčíková	6–3, 6–2
Loss	1.	28 October 2013	10,000	ITF Umag, Croatia	Clay	(Czech Republic) Barbora Krejčíková	1–6, 4–6
Win	4.	4 November 2013	10,000	ITF Umag, Croatia	Clay	(Croatia) Adrijana Lekaj	6–0, 6–1
Loss	2.	21 July 2014	10,000	Palić Open, Serbia	Clay	(Ukraine) Elizaveta Ianchuk	7–6^{(11)}, 5–7, 4–6
Win	5.	25 July 2016	10,000	Palić Open, Serbia	Clay	(France) Sara Cakarevic	6–4, 1–6, 6–4
Loss	3.	10 October 2016	10,000	ITF Antalya, Turkey	Clay	(Turkey) Ayla Aksu	4–6, 6–2, 5–7
Loss	4.	17 October 2016	10,000	ITF Antalya, Turkey	Clay	(Turkey) Ayla Aksu	5–7, 2–6
Win	6.	24 October 2016	10,000	ITF Antalya, Turkey	Clay	(Russia) Ulyana Ayzatulina	7–5, 6–1
Win	7.	21 November 2016	10,000	ITF Antalya, Turkey	Clay	(Germany) Dana Kremer	7–5, 6–2
Win	8.	28 November 2016	10,000	ITF Antalya, Turkey	Clay	(Hungary) Vanda Lukács	6–4, 2–6, 6–4
Loss	5.	2 July 2017	25,000	ITF Lund, Sweden	Clay	(Italy) Martina di Giuseppe	4–6, 6–2, 2–6

=== Doubles: 36 (20–16) ===
Legend $50/60,000 tournaments $25,000 tournaments $10/15,000 tournaments	Finals by surface Hard (1–2) Clay (19–14)

Result	No.	Date	Tier	Tournament	Surface	Partner	Opponents	Score
Loss	1.	23 July 2012	10,000	Palić Open, Serbia	Clay	(Hungary) Csilla Borsányi	(Slovakia) Karin Morgošová (Slovakia) Lenka Tvarošková	7–5, 4–6, [8–10]
Win	1.	5 November 2012	10,000	ITF Antalya, Turkey	Clay	(Czech Republic) Petra Krejsová	(Romania) Diana Buzean (Netherlands) Daniëlle Harmsen	w/o
Win	2.	18 February 2013	10,000	ITF Antalya, Turkey	Clay	(Slovakia) Vivien Juhászová	(Romania) Ioana Ducu (Romania) Cristina Ene	6–1, 2–6, [10–6]
Loss	2.	4 March 2013	10,000	ITF Antalya, Turkey	Clay	(Slovakia) Vivien Juhászová	(Italy) Gioia Barbieri (United States) Nicole Melichar	6–7^{(2)}, 4–6
Win	3.	21 October 2013	10,000	ITF Dubrovnik, Croatia	Clay	(Slovakia) Vivien Juhászová	(Slovakia) Lenka Juríková (Czech Republic) Barbora Krejčíková	6–3, 6–3
Loss	3.	28 October 2013	10,000	ITF Umag, Croatia	Clay	(Czech Republic) Barbora Krejčíková	(Slovakia) Vivien Juhászová (Czech Republic) Tereza Malíková	4–6, 6–7^{(5)}
Win	4.	4 November 2013	10,000	ITF Umag, Croatia	Clay	(Slovakia) Vivien Juhászová	(Ukraine) Alyona Sotnikova (Italy) Giulia Sussarello	6–4, 6–0
Loss	4.	20 January 2014	25,000	ITF Sunderland, United Kingdom	Hard (i)	(Bulgaria) Viktoriya Tomova	(United Kingdom) Jocelyn Rae (United Kingdom) Anna Smith	1–6, 1–6
Loss	5.	10 February 2014	15,000	ITF Tallinn, Estonia	Hard (i)	(Bulgaria) Viktoriya Tomova	(Georgia (country)) Sofia Shapatava (Slovenia) Maša Zec Peškirič	4–6, 6–7^{(4)}
Win	5.	31 March 2014	10,000	ITF Šibenik, Croatia	Clay	(Bulgaria) Viktoriya Tomova	(Czech Republic) Eva Rutarová (Czech Republic) Karolína Stuchlá	7–6^{(12)}, 6–1
Win	6.	7 April 2014	10,000	ITF Bol, Croatia	Clay	(Bulgaria) Viktoriya Tomova	(Czech Republic) Karolína Stuchlá (France) Carla Touly	6–2, 6–1
Loss	6.	18 August 2014	10,000	ITF Vinkovci, Croatia	Clay	(Hungary) Lilla Barzó	(Croatia) Jana Fett (Croatia) Adrijana Lekaj	3–6, 5–7
Loss	7.	9 February 2015	10,000	ITF Palma Nova, Spain	Clay	(Romania) Irina Bara	(United Kingdom) Amanda Carreras (Italy) Alice Savoretti	4–6, 1–6
Win	7.	16 February 2015	10,000	ITF Palma Nova, Spain	Clay	(Romania) Irina Bara	(Romania) Ana Bianca Mihăilă (Czech Republic) Gabriela Pantůčková	6–1, 6–1
Win	8.	23 February 2015	10,000	ITF Palma Nova, Spain	Clay	(Romania) Irina Bara	(Germany) Kim Grajdek (Lithuania) Akvilė Paražinskaitė	6–2, 6–4
Win	9.	16 March 2015	10,000	ITF Gonesse, France	Clay (i)	(Romania) Oana Georgeta Simion	(Ukraine) Elizaveta Ianchuk (Ukraine) Olga Ianchuk	6–4, 3–6, [10–6]
Win	10.	8 June 2015	10,000	ITF Bol, Croatia	Clay	(Russia) Eugeniya Pashkova	(Netherlands) Liv Geurts (Netherlands) Janneke Wikkerink	w/o
Loss	8.	3 August 2015	10,000	ITF Vienna, Austria	Clay	(Austria) Janina Toljan	(Australia) Sally Peers (France) Laëtitia Sarrazin	1–6, 2–6
Win	11.	24 August 2015	10,000	ITF Čakovec, Croatia	Clay	(Slovakia) Vivien Juhászová	(Czech Republic) Nina Holanová (Slovakia) Katarína Strešnáková	6–4, 6–2
Win	12.	14 September 2015	10,000	ITF Brčko, Bosnia & Herzegovina	Clay	(Slovakia) Vivien Juhászová	(Bosnia and Herzegovina) Anita Husarić (Austria) Janina Toljan	5–7, 6–4, [10–8]
Loss	9.	21 September 2015	10,000	ITF Brno, Czech Republic	Clay	(Poland) Veronika Domagała	(Czech Republic) Kristýna Hrabalová (Czech Republic) Nikola Tomanová	2–6, 6–2, [9–11]
Win	13.	16 November 2015	10,000	ITF Antalya, Turkey	Clay	(Slovakia) Vivien Juhászová	(Hungary) Anna Bondár (Hungary) Rebeka Stolmár	7–5, 6–3
Win	14.	11 January 2016	10,000	ITF Antalya, Turkey	Clay	(Austria) Julia Grabher	(Georgia (country)) Ekaterine Gorgodze (Georgia (country)) Sofia Kvatsabaia	1–6, 6–4, [11–9]
Win	15.	1 February 2016	10,000	ITF Antalya, Turkey	Clay	(Austria) Julia Grabher	(Romania) Daiana Negreanu (India) Kyra Shroff	6–3, 6–4
Win	16.	21 March 2016	10,000	ITF Antalya, Turkey	Hard	(Slovakia) Vivien Juhászová	(Slovakia) Michaela Hončová (Slovakia) Chantal Škamlová	6–4, 6–1
Loss	10.	5 September 2016	50,000	Hungarian Pro Ladies Open	Clay	(Czech Republic) Jesika Malečková	(Netherlands) Cindy Burger (Netherlands) Arantxa Rus	1–6, 4–6
Win	17.	17 October 2016	10,000	ITF Antalya, Turkey	Clay	(Romania) Diana Enache	(Russia) Ulyana Ayzatulina (Ukraine) Anastasiya Poplavska	6–4, 6–1
Loss	11.	21 November 2016	10,000	ITF Antalya, Turkey	Clay	(Slovakia) Vivien Juhászová	(Bulgaria) Dia Evtimova (Turkey) Melis Sezer	4–6, 3–6
Win	18.	28 November 2016	10,000	ITF Antalya, Turkey	Clay	(Ukraine) Anastasiya Shoshyna	(Bulgaria) Ani Vangelova (United States) Caitlyn Williams	6–2, 4–6, [10–7]
Loss	12.	30 April 2017	60,000	Nana Trophy, Tunisia	Clay	(Slovakia) Vivien Juhászová	(Argentina) Guadalupe Pérez Rojas (Chile) Daniela Seguel	7–6^{(3)}, 3–6, [9–11]
Loss	13.	23 June 2017	25,000	ITF Baja, Hungary	Clay	(Slovakia) Vivien Juhászová	(Slovakia) Chantal Škamlová (Germany) Anna Zaja	7–6^{(5)}, 1–6, [9–11]
Loss	14.	29 July 2017	25,000	ITF Horb, Germany	Clay	(Bulgaria) Isabella Shinikova	(Netherlands) Lesley Kerkhove (Netherlands) Bibiane Schoofs	5–7, 3–6
Loss	15.	10 September 2017	25,000	ITF Balatonboglár, Hungary	Clay	(Slovakia) Vivien Juhászová	(Russia) Irina Khromacheva (Latvia) Diāna Marcinkēviča	4–6, 3–6
Win	19.	3 March 2018	15,000	ITF Antalya, Turkey	Clay	(Bosnia and Herzegovina) Dea Herdželaš	(Russia) Amina Anshba (Ukraine) Anastasiya Vasylyeva	6–3, 6–3
Loss	16.	4 May 2018	25,000	ITF Balatonboglár, Hungary	Clay	(Hungary) Dalma Gálfi	(Hungary) Anna Bondár (Romania) Raluca Șerban	1–6, 6–7^{(2)}
Win	20.	11 November 2018	15,000	ITF Antalya, Turkey	Clay	(Bulgaria) Dia Evtimova	(Russia) Veronika Pepelyaeva (Russia) Anastasia Tikhonova	6–3, 3–6, [11–9]

== Junior finals ==
=== ITF Junior Circuit ===
Category G2
Category G3
Category G4
Category G5

==== Singles (1–1) ====
Result	Date	Tournament	Grade	Surface	Opponent	Score
Loss	6 November 2010	Budapest, Hungary	G5	Clay	(Croatia) Dora Vajdić	2–6, 2–6
Win	19 June 2011	Lviv, Ukraine	G3	Clay	(Norway) Hedda Ødegaard	6–3, 6–4

==== Doubles (2–1) ====
Result	Date	Tournament	Grade	Surface	Partner	Opponents	Score
Win	8 August 2009	Timișoara, Romania	G4	Clay	(Slovakia) Veronika Zateková	(Slovakia) Karolína Pondušová (Serbia) Isidora Radojković	6–2, 6–2
Win	6 June 2010	Budapest, Hungary	G2	Hard	(Belarus) Darya Lebesheva	(Belarus) Karyna Alesha (Belarus) Viktoryia Kisialeva	6–4, 6–2
Loss	19 June 2011	Lviv, Ukraine	G3	Clay	(Czech Republic) Dominika Paterová	(Russia) Alena Tarasova (Russia) Julia Valetova	6–7^{(7–9)}, 3–6

== National representation ==
Bukta made her Fed Cup debut for Hungary in 2017, while the team was competing in the Europe/Africa Zone Group I, when she was 23 years and 103 days old.

=== Fed Cup ===
Group membership World Group II World Group II Play-off Europe/Africa Group (2–0)	Matches by surface Hard (2–0) Clay (0–0)	Matches by type Singles (1–0) Doubles (1–0)	Matches by setting Indoors (2–0) Outdoors (0–0)

==== Singles (1–0) ====
Edition	Stage	Date	Location	Against	Surface	Opponent	W/L	Score
2017 Fed Cup; Europe/Africa Zone Group I	5th-8th Playoff	11 February 2017	Tallinn, Estonia	Latvia	Hard (i)	Daniela Vismane	W	6–2, 6–3

==== Doubles (1–0) ====
Edition	Stage	Date	Location	Against	Surface	Partner	Opponents	W/L	Score
2017 Fed Cup; Europe/Africa Zone Group I	Pool B	9 February 2017	Tallinn, Estonia	(Bosnia and Herzegovina) Bosnia & Herzegovina	Hard (i)	Fanny Stollár	Dea Herdželaš; Anita Husarić	W	6–4, 6–3
