= 2017 ITF Women's Circuit (April–June) =

Women's tennis tour in 2017

The 2017 ITF Women's Circuit is the 2017 edition of the second tier tour for women's professional tennis. It is organised by the International Tennis Federation and is a tier below the WTA Tour. The ITF Women's Circuit includes tournaments with prize money ranging from $15,000 up to $100,000.

== Key ==
Category
$100,000 tournaments
$80,000 tournaments
$60,000 tournaments
$25,000 tournaments
$15,000 tournaments

== Month ==
=== April ===
Week of	Tournament	Winner	Runners-up	Semifinalists	Quarterfinalists
April 3	Pula, Italy; Clay $25,000; Singles and doubles draws	(Croatia) Petra Martić; 6–4, 7–5	(Liechtenstein) Kathinka von Deichmann	(Slovakia) Daniela Hantuchová (Australia) Olivia Rogowska	(Spain) Olga Sáez Larra (Czech Republic) Karolína Muchová (Russia) Veronika Kudermetova (Russia) Viktoria Kamenskaya
April 3	Pula, Italy; Clay $25,000; Singles and doubles draws	(Italy) Alice Matteucci (Italy) Camilla Rosatello; 6–1, 6–3	(Netherlands) Bibiane Schoofs (Poland) Sandra Zaniewska	(Slovakia) Daniela Hantuchová (Australia) Olivia Rogowska	(Spain) Olga Sáez Larra (Czech Republic) Karolína Muchová (Russia) Veronika Kudermetova (Russia) Viktoria Kamenskaya
April 3	Kashiwa, Japan; Hard $25,000; Singles and doubles draws	(Japan) Mai Minokoshi; 3–6, 6–2, 6–4	(South Korea) Jang Su-jeong	(Japan) Yuuki Tanaka (Thailand) Luksika Kumkhum	(United States) Yuki Kristina Chiang (Japan) Erika Sema (Japan) Momoko Kobori (South Korea) Han Na-lae
April 3	Kashiwa, Japan; Hard $25,000; Singles and doubles draws	(South Korea) Jang Su-jeong (Chinese Taipei) Lee Ya-hsuan; 6–3, 3–6, [10–4]	(South Korea) Han Na-lae (Thailand) Peangtarn Plipuech	(Japan) Yuuki Tanaka (Thailand) Luksika Kumkhum	(United States) Yuki Kristina Chiang (Japan) Erika Sema (Japan) Momoko Kobori (South Korea) Han Na-lae
April 3	Istanbul, Turkey; Hard (indoor) $25,000; Singles and doubles draws	(Bulgaria) Viktoriya Tomova; 6–4, 4–6, 6–2	(Slovakia) Viktória Kužmová	(Slovakia) Magdaléna Rybáriková (Russia) Polina Monova	(Croatia) Ana Vrljić (United Kingdom) Laura Robson (Turkey) Ayla Aksu (Russia) Valentyna Ivakhnenko
April 3	Istanbul, Turkey; Hard (indoor) $25,000; Singles and doubles draws	(Russia) Olga Doroshina (Russia) Polina Monova; 6–3, 6–2	(United Kingdom) Freya Christie (United Kingdom) Laura Robson	(Slovakia) Magdaléna Rybáriková (Russia) Polina Monova	(Croatia) Ana Vrljić (United Kingdom) Laura Robson (Turkey) Ayla Aksu (Russia) Valentyna Ivakhnenko
April 3	Jackson, United States; Clay $25,000; Singles and doubles draws	(Austria) Barbara Haas; 6–4, 6–7^{(3–7)}, 6–4	(United States) Sophie Chang	(Russia) Alla Kudryavtseva (United States) Usue Maitane Arconada	(United States) Victoria Flores (Chile) Alexa Guarachi (Chinese Taipei) Hsu Chieh-yu (Canada) Katherine Sebov
April 3	Jackson, United States; Clay $25,000; Singles and doubles draws	(Russia) Alla Kudryavtseva (Germany) Anna Zaja; 6–2, 6–0	(Chile) Alexa Guarachi (United States) Ronit Yurovsky	(Russia) Alla Kudryavtseva (United States) Usue Maitane Arconada	(United States) Victoria Flores (Chile) Alexa Guarachi (Chinese Taipei) Hsu Chieh-yu (Canada) Katherine Sebov
April 3	São José dos Campos, Brazil; Clay $15,000; Singles and doubles draws	(Brazil) Nathaly Kurata; 7–6^{(7–3)}, 6–0	(Argentina) Julieta Lara Estable	(Argentina) Stephanie Mariel Petit (Brazil) Gabriela Cé	(Brazil) Giovanna Tomita (Germany) Dana Kremer (Argentina) Martina Capurro Taborda (Chile) Bárbara Gatica
April 3	São José dos Campos, Brazil; Clay $15,000; Singles and doubles draws	(Brazil) Gabriela Cé (Brazil) Thaisa Grana Pedretti; 5–7, 7–6^{(8–6)}, [10–3]	(Argentina) Victoria Bosio (Argentina) Julieta Lara Estable	(Argentina) Stephanie Mariel Petit (Brazil) Gabriela Cé	(Brazil) Giovanna Tomita (Germany) Dana Kremer (Argentina) Martina Capurro Taborda (Chile) Bárbara Gatica
April 3	Tučepi, Croatia; Clay $15,000; Singles and doubles draws	(Croatia) Lea Bošković; 6–3, 1–6, 6–1	(Slovakia) Lenka Juríková	(Czech Republic) Gabriela Pantůčková (United States) Sabrina Santamaria	(France) Clothilde de Bernardi (Romania) Irina Fetecău (Czech Republic) Magdaléna Pantůčková (Slovenia) Nina Potočnik
April 3	Tučepi, Croatia; Clay $15,000; Singles and doubles draws	(Finland) Emma Laine (United States) Sabrina Santamaria; 6–3, 6–2	(Slovakia) Jana Jablonovská (Slovakia) Sandra Jamrichová	(Czech Republic) Gabriela Pantůčková (United States) Sabrina Santamaria	(France) Clothilde de Bernardi (Romania) Irina Fetecău (Czech Republic) Magdaléna Pantůčková (Slovenia) Nina Potočnik
April 3	Sharm El Sheikh, Egypt; Hard $15,000; Singles and doubles draws	(Russia) Margarita Skryabina; 2–6, 6–2, 3–0, ret.	(Germany) Sarah-Rebecca Sekulic	(Egypt) Sandra Samir (Sweden) Linnéa Malmqvist	(Romania) Laura-Ioana Andrei (Italy) Lucrezia Stefanini (Sweden) Kajsa Rinaldo Persson (Chinese Taipei) Hsu Ching-wen
April 3	Sharm El Sheikh, Egypt; Hard $15,000; Singles and doubles draws	(Montenegro) Ana Veselinović (China) You Xiaodi; 6–3, 7–5	(Egypt) Ola Abou Zekry (Egypt) Sandra Samir	(Egypt) Sandra Samir (Sweden) Linnéa Malmqvist	(Romania) Laura-Ioana Andrei (Italy) Lucrezia Stefanini (Sweden) Kajsa Rinaldo Persson (Chinese Taipei) Hsu Ching-wen
April 3	Dijon, France; Hard (indoor) $15,000; Singles and doubles draws	(France) Audrey Albié; 6–4, 0–6, 7–6^{(7–5)}	(Ukraine) Anastasia Zarytska	(France) Jessika Ponchet (France) Théo Gravouil	(France) Mathilde Armitano (Italy) Ludmilla Samsonova (Belarus) Lidziya Marozava (France) Léa Tholey
April 3	Dijon, France; Hard (indoor) $15,000; Singles and doubles draws	(Latvia) Diāna Marcinkēviča (Switzerland) Rebeka Masarova; 6–4, 6–3	(France) Victoria Muntean (Ukraine) Anastasia Zarytska	(France) Jessika Ponchet (France) Théo Gravouil	(France) Mathilde Armitano (Italy) Ludmilla Samsonova (Belarus) Lidziya Marozava (France) Léa Tholey
April 3	Heraklion, Greece; Clay $15,000; Singles and doubles draws	(Australia) Nina Alibalić; 6–1, 6–3	(Slovenia) Nastja Kolar	(Romania) Daiana Negreanu (Paraguay) Camila Giangreco Campiz	(Germany) Romy Kölzer (India) Karman Kaur Thandi (Russia) Anna Ukolova (Romania) Ioana Gaspar
April 3	Heraklion, Greece; Clay $15,000; Singles and doubles draws	(Slovenia) Nastja Kolar (Bosnia and Herzegovina) Jasmina Tinjić; 6–1, 6–1	(Serbia) Tamara Čurović (Paraguay) Camila Giangreco Campiz	(Romania) Daiana Negreanu (Paraguay) Camila Giangreco Campiz	(Germany) Romy Kölzer (India) Karman Kaur Thandi (Russia) Anna Ukolova (Romania) Ioana Gaspar
April 3	Hammamet, Tunisia; Clay $15,000; Singles and doubles draws	(Spain) Estrella Cabeza Candela; 6–3, 7–5	(Chile) Fernanda Brito	(Greece) Eleni Kordolaimi (Italy) Gaia Sanesi	(Bosnia and Herzegovina) Jelena Simić (Hungary) Panna Udvardy (Chile) Daniela Macarena López (Switzerland) Chiara Grimm
April 3	Hammamet, Tunisia; Clay $15,000; Singles and doubles draws	(Italy) Alice Balducci (Italy) Giorgia Marchetti; 2–6, 6–3, [10–2]	(Chile) Fernanda Brito (Italy) Gaia Sanesi	(Greece) Eleni Kordolaimi (Italy) Gaia Sanesi	(Bosnia and Herzegovina) Jelena Simić (Hungary) Panna Udvardy (Chile) Daniela Macarena López (Switzerland) Chiara Grimm
April 10	Revolution Technologies Pro Tennis Classic; Indian Harbour Beach, United States; Clay $80,000; Singles – Doubles	(Belarus) Olga Govortsova; 6–3, 4–6, 6–3	(United States) Amanda Anisimova	(United States) Victoria Duval (Tunisia) Ons Jabeur	(Canada) Eugenie Bouchard (Mexico) Renata Zarazúa (United States) Kristie Ahn (United States) Madison Brengle
April 10	Revolution Technologies Pro Tennis Classic; Indian Harbour Beach, United States; Clay $80,000; Singles – Doubles	(United States) Kristie Ahn (United States) Quinn Gleason; 6–3, 6–2	(Brazil) Laura Pigossi (Mexico) Renata Zarazúa	(United States) Victoria Duval (Tunisia) Ons Jabeur	(Canada) Eugenie Bouchard (Mexico) Renata Zarazúa (United States) Kristie Ahn (United States) Madison Brengle
April 10	Lale Cup; Istanbul, Turkey; Hard $60,000; Singles – Doubles	(Turkey) Başak Eraydın; 6–3, 6–0	(Czech Republic) Petra Krejsová	(Poland) Magdalena Fręch (Belarus) Vera Lapko	(Ukraine) Kateryna Kozlova (Russia) Polina Monova (Belarus) Sviatlana Pirazhenka (Uzbekistan) Sabina Sharipova
April 10	Lale Cup; Istanbul, Turkey; Hard $60,000; Singles – Doubles	(Russia) Veronika Kudermetova (Turkey) İpek Soylu; 4–6, 7–5, [11–9]	(Russia) Ksenia Lykina (Russia) Polina Monova	(Poland) Magdalena Fręch (Belarus) Vera Lapko	(Ukraine) Kateryna Kozlova (Russia) Polina Monova (Belarus) Sviatlana Pirazhenka (Uzbekistan) Sabina Sharipova
April 10	Nanning, China; Hard $25,000; Singles and doubles draws	(Kazakhstan) Zarina Diyas; 6–2, 6–3	(Chinese Taipei) Lee Ya-hsuan	(China) Lu Jingjing (China) Han Xinyun	(Japan) Mai Minokoshi (Japan) Miharu Imanishi (China) Tang Qianhui (China) Guo Hanyu
April 10	Nanning, China; Hard $25,000; Singles and doubles draws	(China) Lu Jingjing (Russia) Valeria Savinykh; 6–4, 6–4	(China) Gai Ao (China) Guo Hanyu	(China) Lu Jingjing (China) Han Xinyun	(Japan) Mai Minokoshi (Japan) Miharu Imanishi (China) Tang Qianhui (China) Guo Hanyu
April 10	Pula, Italy; Clay $25,000; Singles and doubles draws	(Italy) Georgia Brescia; 6–1, 6–2	(United States) Bernarda Pera	(Croatia) Petra Martić (Romania) Irina Maria Bara	(Czech Republic) Karolína Muchová (Spain) Paula Badosa Gibert (Germany) Katharina Hobgarski (Belgium) Marie Benoît
April 10	Pula, Italy; Clay $25,000; Singles and doubles draws	(Spain) Georgina García Pérez (United States) Bernarda Pera; 6–4, 6–3	(Italy) Cristiana Ferrando (Italy) Camilla Rosatello	(Croatia) Petra Martić (Romania) Irina Maria Bara	(Czech Republic) Karolína Muchová (Spain) Paula Badosa Gibert (Germany) Katharina Hobgarski (Belgium) Marie Benoît
April 10	Irapuato, Mexico; Hard $25,000; Singles and doubles draws	(Israel) Deniz Khazaniuk; Walkover	(Russia) Sofya Zhuk	(Slovakia) Michaela Hončová (United Kingdom) Katie Swan	(United States) Ronit Yurovsky (Japan) Mari Osaka (Mexico) Victoria Rodríguez (Mexico) Marcela Zacarías
April 10	Irapuato, Mexico; Hard $25,000; Singles and doubles draws	(United States) Desirae Krawczyk (Mexico) Giuliana Olmos; 6–1, 6–0	(United States) Ronit Yurovsky (Mexico) Marcela Zacarías	(Slovakia) Michaela Hončová (United Kingdom) Katie Swan	(United States) Ronit Yurovsky (Japan) Mari Osaka (Mexico) Victoria Rodríguez (Mexico) Marcela Zacarías
April 10	Pelham, United States; Clay $25,000; Singles and doubles draws	(Norway) Ulrikke Eikeri; 7–5, 6–2	(United States) Usue Maitane Arconada	(Chile) Alexa Guarachi (United Kingdom) Amanda Carreras	(Romania) Jaqueline Cristian (Ukraine) Elizaveta Ianchuk (Croatia) Tena Lukas (Canada) Gabriela Dabrowski
April 10	Pelham, United States; Clay $25,000; Singles and doubles draws	(United States) Emina Bektas (United States) Sanaz Marand; Walkover	(United Kingdom) Amanda Carreras (Croatia) Tena Lukas	(Chile) Alexa Guarachi (United Kingdom) Amanda Carreras	(Romania) Jaqueline Cristian (Ukraine) Elizaveta Ianchuk (Croatia) Tena Lukas (Canada) Gabriela Dabrowski
April 10	Sharm El Sheikh, Egypt; Hard $15,000; Singles and doubles draws	(Germany) Sarah-Rebecca Sekulic; 6–7^{(5–7)}, 7–6^{(7–2)}, 6–2	(Romania) Laura-Ioana Andrei	(Montenegro) Ana Veselinović (Belgium) Magali Kempen	(Estonia) Maileen Nuudi (Egypt) Sandra Samir (Georgia (country)) Mariam Bolkvadze (Austria) Melanie Klaffner
April 10	Sharm El Sheikh, Egypt; Hard $15,000; Singles and doubles draws	(Montenegro) Ana Veselinović (China) You Xiaodi; 2–6, 7–5, [13–11]	(Romania) Laura-Ioana Andrei (Austria) Melanie Klaffner	(Montenegro) Ana Veselinović (Belgium) Magali Kempen	(Estonia) Maileen Nuudi (Egypt) Sandra Samir (Georgia (country)) Mariam Bolkvadze (Austria) Melanie Klaffner
April 10	Shymkent, Kazakhstan; Clay $15,000; Singles and doubles draws	(Kazakhstan) Kamila Kerimbayeva; 6–4, 6–0	(Uzbekistan) Albina Khabibulina	(Russia) Daria Kruzhkova (Russia) Anastasia Gasanova	(Russia) Karine Sarkisova (Moldova) Alexandra Perper (Ukraine) Kateryna Sliusar (Russia) Yana Sizikova
April 10	Shymkent, Kazakhstan; Clay $15,000; Singles and doubles draws	(Belarus) Ilona Kremen (Russia) Yana Sizikova; 6–4, 6–1	(Russia) Anastasia Gasanova (Russia) Anastasia Pribylova	(Russia) Daria Kruzhkova (Russia) Anastasia Gasanova	(Russia) Karine Sarkisova (Moldova) Alexandra Perper (Ukraine) Kateryna Sliusar (Russia) Yana Sizikova
April 10	Hammamet, Tunisia; Clay $15,000; Singles and doubles draws	(Hungary) Panna Udvardy; 1–6, 6–4, 6–3	(France) Audrey Albié	(Chile) Fernanda Brito (Tunisia) Chiraz Bechri	(Germany) Katharina Gerlach (France) Emma Léné (Spain) Guiomar Maristany (Serbia) Bojana Marković
April 10	Hammamet, Tunisia; Clay $15,000; Singles and doubles draws	(United Kingdom) Maia Lumsden (Hungary) Panna Udvardy; 6–4, 5–7, [10–4]	(Chile) Fernanda Brito (Sweden) Fanny Östlund	(Chile) Fernanda Brito (Tunisia) Chiraz Bechri	(Germany) Katharina Gerlach (France) Emma Léné (Spain) Guiomar Maristany (Serbia) Bojana Marković
April 17	Hardee's Pro Classic; Dothan, United States; Clay $60,000; Singles – Doubles	(United States) Kristie Ahn; 1–6, 6–2, 6–2	(United States) Amanda Anisimova	(Austria) Barbara Haas (United States) Sofia Kenin	(Hungary) Fanny Stollár (Portugal) Michelle Larcher de Brito (United States) Usue Maitane Arconada (United States) Sophie Chang
April 17	Hardee's Pro Classic; Dothan, United States; Clay $60,000; Singles – Doubles	(United States) Emina Bektas (United States) Sanaz Marand; 6–3, 1–6, [10–2]	(United States) Kristie Ahn (Australia) Lizette Cabrera	(Austria) Barbara Haas (United States) Sofia Kenin	(Hungary) Fanny Stollár (Portugal) Michelle Larcher de Brito (United States) Usue Maitane Arconada (United States) Sophie Chang
April 17	Pula, Italy; Clay $25,000; Singles and doubles draws	(Russia) Valentyna Ivakhnenko; 7–5, 6–3	(Spain) Georgina García Pérez	(Switzerland) Conny Perrin (Italy) Beatrice Torelli	(Belgium) Kimberley Zimmermann (Croatia) Tereza Mrdeža (Russia) Elizaveta Kulichkova (Italy) Martina Di Giuseppe
April 17	Pula, Italy; Clay $25,000; Singles and doubles draws	(India) Ankita Raina (Netherlands) Eva Wacanno; 6–4, 6–4	(Spain) Irene Burillo Escorihuela (Spain) Yvonne Cavallé Reimers	(Switzerland) Conny Perrin (Italy) Beatrice Torelli	(Belgium) Kimberley Zimmermann (Croatia) Tereza Mrdeža (Russia) Elizaveta Kulichkova (Italy) Martina Di Giuseppe
April 17	Chiasso, Switzerland; Clay $25,000; Singles and doubles draws	(Switzerland) Jil Teichmann; 2–6, 6–3, 6–2	(Liechtenstein) Kathinka von Deichmann	(Czech Republic) Marie Bouzková (France) Myrtille Georges	(France) Shérazad Reix (North Macedonia) Lina Gjorcheska (Hungary) Dalma Gálfi (Slovakia) Lenka Juríková
April 17	Chiasso, Switzerland; Clay $25,000; Singles and doubles draws	(North Macedonia) Lina Gjorcheska (Bulgaria) Aleksandrina Naydenova; 7–5, 2–6, [10–7]	(Czech Republic) Kateřina Kramperová (Netherlands) Rosalie van der Hoek	(Czech Republic) Marie Bouzková (France) Myrtille Georges	(France) Shérazad Reix (North Macedonia) Lina Gjorcheska (Hungary) Dalma Gálfi (Slovakia) Lenka Juríková
April 17	Cairo, Egypt; Clay $15,000; Singles and doubles draws	(Belgium) Hélène Scholsen; 4–6, 6–2, 6–2	(Colombia) María Fernanda Herazo	(Paraguay) Camila Giangreco Campiz (Netherlands) Dominique Karregat	(Greece) Despina Papamichail (Guatemala) Kirsten-Andrea Weedon (India) Sowjanya Bavisetti (Romania) Irina Fetecău
April 17	Cairo, Egypt; Clay $15,000; Singles and doubles draws	(Georgia (country)) Mariam Bolkvadze (Slovakia) Tereza Mihalíková; 7–6^{(9–7)}, 6–3	(Serbia) Bojana Marinković (Greece) Despina Papamichail	(Paraguay) Camila Giangreco Campiz (Netherlands) Dominique Karregat	(Greece) Despina Papamichail (Guatemala) Kirsten-Andrea Weedon (India) Sowjanya Bavisetti (Romania) Irina Fetecău
April 17	Shymkent, Kazakhstan; Clay $15,000; Singles and doubles draws	(Ukraine) Maryna Chernyshova; 6–3, 6–3	(Russia) Anastasia Pribylova	(Austria) Marlies Szupper (Ukraine) Veronika Kapshay	(Russia) Angelina Gabueva (Russia) Yana Sizikova (Uzbekistan) Arina Folts (Russia) Karine Sarkisova
April 17	Shymkent, Kazakhstan; Clay $15,000; Singles and doubles draws	(Belarus) Ilona Kremen (Russia) Yana Sizikova; 7–6^{(7–2)}, 6–1	(Ukraine) Veronika Kapshay (Moldova) Alexandra Perper	(Austria) Marlies Szupper (Ukraine) Veronika Kapshay	(Russia) Angelina Gabueva (Russia) Yana Sizikova (Uzbekistan) Arina Folts (Russia) Karine Sarkisova
April 17	Hammamet, Tunisia; Clay $15,000; Singles and doubles draws	(France) Tessah Andrianjafitrimo; 6–2, 6–4	(Italy) Camilla Scala	(Venezuela) Andrea Gámiz (Spain) Guiomar Maristany	(France) Jessika Ponchet (France) Manon Arcangioli (Brazil) Gabriela Cé (Sweden) Fanny Östlund
April 17	Hammamet, Tunisia; Clay $15,000; Singles and doubles draws	(Brazil) Gabriela Cé (Venezuela) Andrea Gámiz; 6–1, 6–2	(France) Manon Arcangioli (France) Jessika Ponchet	(Venezuela) Andrea Gámiz (Spain) Guiomar Maristany	(France) Jessika Ponchet (France) Manon Arcangioli (Brazil) Gabriela Cé (Sweden) Fanny Östlund
April 17	Antalya, Turkey; Clay $15,000; Singles and doubles draws	(Poland) Marta Leśniak; 6–3, 6–2	(Russia) Alena Tarasova	(France) Clothilde de Bernardi (Slovenia) Nastja Kolar	(Germany) Yana Morderger (Bulgaria) Ani Vangelova (Germany) Tayisiya Morderger (Slovenia) Eva Zagorac
April 17	Antalya, Turkey; Clay $15,000; Singles and doubles draws	(Finland) Emma Laine (Japan) Yuuki Tanaka; 3–6, 6–1, [10–4]	(Belgium) Marie Benoît (Belgium) Ysaline Bonaventure	(France) Clothilde de Bernardi (Slovenia) Nastja Kolar	(Germany) Yana Morderger (Bulgaria) Ani Vangelova (Germany) Tayisiya Morderger (Slovenia) Eva Zagorac
April 24	Kunming Open; Anning, China; Clay $100,000+H; Singles – Doubles	(China) Zheng Saisai; 7–5, 6–4	(Kazakhstan) Zarina Diyas	(Australia) Arina Rodionova (China) Yang Zhaoxuan	(Croatia) Jana Fett (Greece) Valentini Grammatikopoulou (China) Han Xinyun (China) Gao Xinyu
April 24	Kunming Open; Anning, China; Clay $100,000+H; Singles – Doubles	(China) Han Xinyun (China) Ye Qiuyu; 6–2, 7–5	(India) Prarthana Thombare (China) Xun Fangying	(Australia) Arina Rodionova (China) Yang Zhaoxuan	(Croatia) Jana Fett (Greece) Valentini Grammatikopoulou (China) Han Xinyun (China) Gao Xinyu
April 24	Nana Trophy; Tunis, Tunisia; Clay $60,000; Singles – Doubles	(Netherlands) Richèl Hogenkamp; 7–5, 6–4	(North Macedonia) Lina Gjorcheska	(Croatia) Petra Martić (Hungary) Ágnes Bukta	(Poland) Katarzyna Kawa (Spain) Sílvia Soler Espinosa (France) Manon Arcangioli (Liechtenstein) Kathinka von Deichmann
April 24	Nana Trophy; Tunis, Tunisia; Clay $60,000; Singles – Doubles	(Argentina) Guadalupe Pérez Rojas (Chile) Daniela Seguel; 6–7^{(3–7)}, 6–3, [11–9]	(Hungary) Ágnes Bukta (Slovakia) Vivien Juhászová	(Croatia) Petra Martić (Hungary) Ágnes Bukta	(Poland) Katarzyna Kawa (Spain) Sílvia Soler Espinosa (France) Manon Arcangioli (Liechtenstein) Kathinka von Deichmann
April 24	Boyd Tinsley Women's Clay Court Classic; Charlottesville, United States; Clay $60,000; Singles – Doubles	(United States) Madison Brengle; 6–4, 6–3	(United States) Caroline Dolehide	(United States) Jamie Loeb (Croatia) Ajla Tomljanović	(Ukraine) Anhelina Kalinina (United States) Claire Liu (Mexico) Victoria Rodríguez (Argentina) Catalina Pella
April 24	Boyd Tinsley Women's Clay Court Classic; Charlottesville, United States; Clay $60,000; Singles – Doubles	(Serbia) Jovana Jakšić (Argentina) Catalina Pella; 6–4, 7–6^{(7–5)}	(United States) Madison Brengle (United States) Danielle Collins	(United States) Jamie Loeb (Croatia) Ajla Tomljanović	(Ukraine) Anhelina Kalinina (United States) Claire Liu (Mexico) Victoria Rodríguez (Argentina) Catalina Pella
April 24	Pula, Italy; Clay $25,000; Singles and doubles draws	(Italy) Giulia Gatto-Monticone; 3–6, 7–5, 6–4	(Romania) Irina Maria Bara	(Slovakia) Chantal Škamlová (Romania) Elena Gabriela Ruse	(Croatia) Tereza Mrdeža (France) Tessah Andrianjafitrimo (Italy) Georgia Brescia (Switzerland) Patty Schnyder
April 24	Pula, Italy; Clay $25,000; Singles and doubles draws	(Romania) Irina Maria Bara (Croatia) Tereza Mrdeža; 6–4, 6–2	(France) Sara Cakarevic (Romania) Nicoleta Dascălu	(Slovakia) Chantal Škamlová (Romania) Elena Gabriela Ruse	(Croatia) Tereza Mrdeža (France) Tessah Andrianjafitrimo (Italy) Georgia Brescia (Switzerland) Patty Schnyder
April 24	Qarshi, Uzbekistan; Hard $25,000; Singles and doubles draws	(Russia) Polina Monova; 4–6, 6–3, 6–3	(Ukraine) Olga Ianchuk	(Uzbekistan) Nigina Abduraimova (Russia) Olga Doroshina	(Russia) Olesya Pervushina (United Kingdom) Harriet Dart (India) Ankita Raina (Ukraine) Valeriya Strakhova
April 24	Qarshi, Uzbekistan; Hard $25,000; Singles and doubles draws	(Russia) Olga Doroshina (Russia) Polina Monova; 7–5, 6–2	(Uzbekistan) Nigina Abduraimova (Montenegro) Ana Veselinović	(Uzbekistan) Nigina Abduraimova (Russia) Olga Doroshina	(Russia) Olesya Pervushina (United Kingdom) Harriet Dart (India) Ankita Raina (Ukraine) Valeriya Strakhova
April 24	Cairo, Egypt; Clay $15,000; Singles and doubles draws	(Bosnia and Herzegovina) Dea Herdželaš; 6–3, 6–1	(Romania) Irina Fetecău	(Greece) Despina Papamichail (Serbia) Bojana Marinković	(Netherlands) Dominique Karregat (Paraguay) Camila Giangreco Campiz (Colombia) María Fernanda Herazo (Belgium) Hélène Scholsen
April 24	Cairo, Egypt; Clay $15,000; Singles and doubles draws	(Romania) Irina Fetecău (Czech Republic) Anna Slováková; 7–6^{(7–2)}, 2–6, [10–5]	(Georgia (country)) Mariam Bolkvadze (Belgium) Margaux Bovy	(Greece) Despina Papamichail (Serbia) Bojana Marinković	(Netherlands) Dominique Karregat (Paraguay) Camila Giangreco Campiz (Colombia) María Fernanda Herazo (Belgium) Hélène Scholsen
April 24	Hua Hin, Thailand; Hard $15,000; Singles and doubles draws	(Thailand) Patcharin Cheapchandej; 6–1, 7–5	(Hong Kong) Zhang Ling	(China) Sun Ziyue (Thailand) Nudnida Luangnam	(China) Zheng Wushuang (Belgium) Britt Geukens (India) Prerna Bhambri (India) Karman Kaur Thandi
April 24	Hua Hin, Thailand; Hard $15,000; Singles and doubles draws	(Thailand) Nudnida Luangnam (Thailand) Varunya Wongteanchai; 7–5, 6–2	(Thailand) Patcharin Cheapchandej (South Korea) Han Sung-hee	(China) Sun Ziyue (Thailand) Nudnida Luangnam	(China) Zheng Wushuang (Belgium) Britt Geukens (India) Prerna Bhambri (India) Karman Kaur Thandi
April 24	Antalya, Turkey; Clay $15,000; Singles and doubles draws	(Belgium) Ysaline Bonaventure; 6–4, 6–2	(Japan) Yuuki Tanaka	(Belgium) Marie Benoît (Russia) Amina Anshba	(Poland) Marta Leśniak (Slovakia) Natália Vajdová (France) Margot Yerolymos (Sweden) Jacqueline Cabaj Awad
April 24	Antalya, Turkey; Clay $15,000; Singles and doubles draws	(Sweden) Jacqueline Cabaj Awad (France) Margot Yerolymos; 7–6^{(7–5)}, 3–6, [10–8]	(Russia) Amina Anshba (Netherlands) Nina Kruijer	(Belgium) Marie Benoît (Russia) Amina Anshba	(Poland) Marta Leśniak (Slovakia) Natália Vajdová (France) Margot Yerolymos (Sweden) Jacqueline Cabaj Awad

=== May ===
Week of	Tournament	Winner	Runners-up	Semifinalists	Quarterfinalists
May 1	Kangaroo Cup; Gifu, Japan; Hard $80,000; Singles – Doubles	(Slovakia) Magdaléna Rybáriková; 6–2, 6–3	(China) Zhu Lin	(Japan) Kurumi Nara (Thailand) Luksika Kumkhum	(Japan) Shiho Akita (United Kingdom) Laura Robson (Australia) Arina Rodionova (Israel) Julia Glushko
May 1	Kangaroo Cup; Gifu, Japan; Hard $80,000; Singles – Doubles	(Japan) Eri Hozumi (Japan) Miyu Kato; 6–4, 6–2	(United Kingdom) Katy Dunne (Israel) Julia Glushko	(Japan) Kurumi Nara (Thailand) Luksika Kumkhum	(Japan) Shiho Akita (United Kingdom) Laura Robson (Australia) Arina Rodionova (Israel) Julia Glushko
May 1	LTP Charleston Pro Tennis; Charleston, United States; Clay $60,000; Singles – Doubles	(United States) Madison Brengle; 4–6, 6–2, 6–3	(United States) Danielle Collins	(United States) Claire Liu (Russia) Sofya Zhuk	(United States) Lauren Embree (Canada) Françoise Abanda (United States) Kayla Day (Ukraine) Elizaveta Ianchuk
May 1	LTP Charleston Pro Tennis; Charleston, United States; Clay $60,000; Singles – Doubles	(United States) Emina Bektas (Chile) Alexa Guarachi; 5–7, 6–3, [10–5]	(United States) Kaitlyn Christian (United States) Sabrina Santamaria	(United States) Claire Liu (Russia) Sofya Zhuk	(United States) Lauren Embree (Canada) Françoise Abanda (United States) Kayla Day (Ukraine) Elizaveta Ianchuk
May 1	Wiesbaden, Germany; Clay $25,000; Singles and doubles draws	(Liechtenstein) Kathinka von Deichmann; 4–6, 6–4, 7–6^{(9–7)}	(Croatia) Petra Martić	(Germany) Katharina Hobgarski (Slovakia) Anna Karolína Schmiedlová	(Switzerland) Rebeka Masarova (Netherlands) Bibiane Schoofs (Australia) Jaimee Fourlis (Romania) Laura-Ioana Andrei
May 1	Wiesbaden, Germany; Clay $25,000; Singles and doubles draws	(Germany) Vivian Heisen (Australia) Storm Sanders; 7–5, 5–7, [10–8]	(Latvia) Diāna Marcinkēviča (Switzerland) Rebeka Masarova	(Germany) Katharina Hobgarski (Slovakia) Anna Karolína Schmiedlová	(Switzerland) Rebeka Masarova (Netherlands) Bibiane Schoofs (Australia) Jaimee Fourlis (Romania) Laura-Ioana Andrei
May 1	Khimki, Russia; Hard (indoor) $25,000; Singles and doubles draws	(Serbia) Dejana Radanović; 6–3, 6–3	(Russia) Anna Morgina	(Russia) Anastasia Potapova (Russia) Anastasia Frolova	(Russia) Polina Monova (United States) Alexandra Morozova (Russia) Olga Puchkova (Romania) Mihaela Buzărnescu
May 1	Khimki, Russia; Hard (indoor) $25,000; Singles and doubles draws	(Russia) Olesya Pervushina (Russia) Anastasia Potapova; 6–0, 6–1	(Russia) Ekaterina Kazionova (Russia) Daria Kruzhkova	(Russia) Anastasia Potapova (Russia) Anastasia Frolova	(Russia) Polina Monova (United States) Alexandra Morozova (Russia) Olga Puchkova (Romania) Mihaela Buzărnescu
May 1	Lleida, Spain; Clay $25,000; Singles and doubles draws	(Spain) Olga Sáez Larra; 6–4, 7–6^{(8–6)}	(Spain) Georgina García Pérez	(Norway) Melanie Stokke (Romania) Elena Gabriela Ruse	(Switzerland) Jil Teichmann (United States) Bernarda Pera (Venezuela) Andrea Gámiz (Spain) Guiomar Maristany
May 1	Lleida, Spain; Clay $25,000; Singles and doubles draws	(Venezuela) Andrea Gámiz (Spain) Georgina García Pérez; 6–1, 4–6, [10–8]	(Belarus) Vera Lapko (Bulgaria) Aleksandrina Naydenova	(Norway) Melanie Stokke (Romania) Elena Gabriela Ruse	(Switzerland) Jil Teichmann (United States) Bernarda Pera (Venezuela) Andrea Gámiz (Spain) Guiomar Maristany
May 1	La Marsa, Tunisia; Clay $25,000; Singles and doubles draws	(France) Myrtille Georges; 6–1, 6–1	(Russia) Alexandra Panova	(Brazil) Gabriela Cé (Chile) Daniela Seguel	(France) Harmony Tan (Russia) Marta Paigina (Belgium) Ysaline Bonaventure (Poland) Katarzyna Kawa
May 1	La Marsa, Tunisia; Clay $25,000; Singles and doubles draws	(Poland) Katarzyna Kawa (Bosnia and Herzegovina) Jasmina Tinjić; 7–5, 6–4	(Bosnia and Herzegovina) Dea Herdželaš (Croatia) Tereza Mrdeža	(Brazil) Gabriela Cé (Chile) Daniela Seguel	(France) Harmony Tan (Russia) Marta Paigina (Belgium) Ysaline Bonaventure (Poland) Katarzyna Kawa
May 1	Cairo, Egypt; Clay $15,000; Singles and doubles draws	(Georgia (country)) Mariam Bolkvadze; 6–3, 3–6, 7–6^{(7–4)}	(Paraguay) Camila Giangreco Campiz	(Russia) Anna Ureke (India) Riya Bhatia	(Colombia) María Fernanda Herazo (India) Sowjanya Bavisetti (Germany) Lisa-Marie Mätschke (Belgium) Magali Kempen
May 1	Cairo, Egypt; Clay $15,000; Singles and doubles draws	(Colombia) María Fernanda Herazo (Belgium) Magali Kempen; 6–1, 6–2	(India) Sowjanya Bavisetti (India) Rishika Sunkara	(Russia) Anna Ureke (India) Riya Bhatia	(Colombia) María Fernanda Herazo (India) Sowjanya Bavisetti (Germany) Lisa-Marie Mätschke (Belgium) Magali Kempen
May 1	Győr, Hungary; Clay $15,000; Singles and doubles draws	(Poland) Iga Świątek; 6–2, 6–2	(Czech Republic) Gabriela Horáčková	(Croatia) Iva Primorac (Hungary) Luca Nagymihály	(Serbia) Tamara Čurović (Austria) Mira Antonitsch (Czech Republic) Diana Šumová (Romania) Miriam Bianca Bulgaru
May 1	Győr, Hungary; Clay $15,000; Singles and doubles draws	(Austria) Mira Antonitsch (Hungary) Panna Udvardy; 6–1, 6–2	(Serbia) Tamara Čurović (China) Wang Xinyu	(Croatia) Iva Primorac (Hungary) Luca Nagymihály	(Serbia) Tamara Čurović (Austria) Mira Antonitsch (Czech Republic) Diana Šumová (Romania) Miriam Bianca Bulgaru
May 1	Acre, Israel; Hard $15,000; Singles and doubles draws	(Greece) Despina Papamichail; 6–1, 6–2	(Belarus) Sadafmoh Tolibova	(Montenegro) Ana Veselinović (Israel) Vlada Ekshibarova	(United States) Alexa Ryngler (Israel) Shelly Krolitzky (Russia) Valeriya Zeleva (Israel) Lina Glushko
May 1	Acre, Israel; Hard $15,000; Singles and doubles draws	(Israel) Vlada Ekshibarova (Greece) Despina Papamichail; 6–4, 6–3	(Israel) Shelly Krolitzky (Israel) Maya Tahan	(Montenegro) Ana Veselinović (Israel) Vlada Ekshibarova	(United States) Alexa Ryngler (Israel) Shelly Krolitzky (Russia) Valeriya Zeleva (Israel) Lina Glushko
May 1	Pula, Italy; Clay $15,000; Singles and doubles draws	(Chile) Fernanda Brito; 6–3, 6–3	(Italy) Ludmilla Samsonova	(Switzerland) Ylena In-Albon (Italy) Giorgia Marchetti	(Argentina) Agustina Chlpac (Sweden) Kajsa Rinaldo Persson (Bolivia) Noelia Zeballos (Australia) Abbie Myers
May 1	Pula, Italy; Clay $15,000; Singles and doubles draws	(Chile) Fernanda Brito (Bolivia) Noelia Zeballos; 6–3, 0–6, [10–3]	(Italy) Maria Masini (Germany) Lisa Ponomar	(Switzerland) Ylena In-Albon (Italy) Giorgia Marchetti	(Argentina) Agustina Chlpac (Sweden) Kajsa Rinaldo Persson (Bolivia) Noelia Zeballos (Australia) Abbie Myers
May 1	Hua Hin, Thailand; Hard $15,000; Singles and doubles draws	(Australia) Michaela Haet; 6–3, 6–7^{(5–7)}, 6–4	(Japan) Chihiro Muramatsu	(United Kingdom) Harriet Dart (Thailand) Nudnida Luangnam	(Australia) Sara Tomic (Thailand) Patcharin Cheapchandej (Australia) Alicia Smith (South Korea) Han Sung-hee
May 1	Hua Hin, Thailand; Hard $15,000; Singles and doubles draws	(China) Chen Jiahui (China) Zhang Ying; 6–4, 6–1	(Oman) Fatma Al-Nabhani (Japan) Chihiro Muramatsu	(United Kingdom) Harriet Dart (Thailand) Nudnida Luangnam	(Australia) Sara Tomic (Thailand) Patcharin Cheapchandej (Australia) Alicia Smith (South Korea) Han Sung-hee
May 1	Antalya, Turkey; Clay $15,000; Singles and doubles draws	(Chile) Bárbara Gatica; 6–2, 7–5	(Russia) Amina Anshba	(Czech Republic) Magdaléna Pantůčková (Russia) Elena Rybakina	(Kyrgyzstan) Ksenia Palkina (Cambodia) Andrea Ka (Germany) Yana Morderger (Germany) Tayisiya Morderger
May 1	Antalya, Turkey; Clay $15,000; Singles and doubles draws	(Russia) Amina Anshba (Russia) Elena Rybakina; 7–5, 4–6, [10–8]	(Russia) Daria Nazarkina (Russia) Anna Ukolova	(Czech Republic) Magdaléna Pantůčková (Russia) Elena Rybakina	(Kyrgyzstan) Ksenia Palkina (Cambodia) Andrea Ka (Germany) Yana Morderger (Germany) Tayisiya Morderger
May 8	Open de Cagnes-sur-Mer Alpes-Maritimes; Cagnes-sur-Mer, France; Clay $100,000; Singles – Doubles	(Brazil) Beatriz Haddad Maia; 6–3, 6–3	(Switzerland) Jil Teichmann	(Montenegro) Danka Kovinić (Ukraine) Katarina Zavatska	(Russia) Elizaveta Kulichkova (Croatia) Jana Fett (Belgium) Alison Van Uytvanck (France) Alizé Lim
May 8	Open de Cagnes-sur-Mer Alpes-Maritimes; Cagnes-sur-Mer, France; Clay $100,000; Singles – Doubles	(Chinese Taipei) Chang Kai-chen (Chinese Taipei) Hsieh Su-wei; 7–5, 6–1	(Romania) Raluca Olaru (Czech Republic) Renata Voráčová	(Montenegro) Danka Kovinić (Ukraine) Katarina Zavatska	(Russia) Elizaveta Kulichkova (Croatia) Jana Fett (Belgium) Alison Van Uytvanck (France) Alizé Lim
May 8	Fukuoka International Women's Cup; Fukuoka, Japan; Carpet $60,000; Singles – Doubles	(Slovakia) Magdaléna Rybáriková; 6–2, 6–3	(South Korea) Jang Su-jeong	(Australia) Jessica Moore (Kazakhstan) Zarina Diyas	(United Kingdom) Laura Robson (Thailand) Varatchaya Wongteanchai (United Kingdom) Katie Boulter (Russia) Ksenia Lykina
May 8	Fukuoka International Women's Cup; Fukuoka, Japan; Carpet $60,000; Singles – Doubles	(Japan) Junri Namigata (Japan) Kotomi Takahata; 6–0, 6–7^{(3–7)}, [10–7]	(Japan) Erina Hayashi (Japan) Robu Kajitani	(Australia) Jessica Moore (Kazakhstan) Zarina Diyas	(United Kingdom) Laura Robson (Thailand) Varatchaya Wongteanchai (United Kingdom) Katie Boulter (Russia) Ksenia Lykina
May 8	Yuxi, China; Hard $25,000; Singles and doubles draws	(China) Gao Xinyu; 6–1, 6–4	(China) Xun Fangying	(China) Guo Hanyu (China) Kang Jiaqi	(China) Jiang Xinyu (China) You Xiaodi (Montenegro) Ana Veselinović (China) Lu Jiaxi
May 8	Yuxi, China; Hard $25,000; Singles and doubles draws	(China) Jiang Xinyu (China) Tang Qianhui; 6–2, 7–5	(China) Gai Ao (China) Kang Jiaqi	(China) Guo Hanyu (China) Kang Jiaqi	(China) Jiang Xinyu (China) You Xiaodi (Montenegro) Ana Veselinović (China) Lu Jiaxi
May 8	Dunakeszi, Hungary; Clay $25,000; Singles and doubles draws	(Ukraine) Marta Kostyuk; 6–4, 6–3	(United States) Bernarda Pera	(Romania) Alexandra Cadanțu (Czech Republic) Anastasia Zarycká	(Turkey) İpek Soylu (Australia) Zoe Hives (Slovakia) Sandra Jamrichová (Slovakia) Viktória Kužmová
May 8	Dunakeszi, Hungary; Clay $25,000; Singles and doubles draws	(Romania) Irina Maria Bara (Romania) Mihaela Buzărnescu; 1–6, 6–1, [10–3]	(Romania) Daiana Negreanu (Romania) Oana Georgeta Simion	(Romania) Alexandra Cadanțu (Czech Republic) Anastasia Zarycká	(Turkey) İpek Soylu (Australia) Zoe Hives (Slovakia) Sandra Jamrichová (Slovakia) Viktória Kužmová
May 8	Rome, Italy; Clay $25,000; Singles and doubles draws	(Austria) Julia Grabher; 7–5, 6–0	(Croatia) Tereza Mrdeža	(Italy) Camilla Scala (North Macedonia) Lina Gjorcheska	(Japan) Mayo Hibi (Japan) Miyu Kato (Australia) Priscilla Hon (Chile) Daniela Seguel
May 8	Rome, Italy; Clay $25,000; Singles and doubles draws	(Japan) Eri Hozumi (Japan) Miyu Kato; 6–1, 6–4	(Georgia (country)) Ekaterine Gorgodze (Norway) Melanie Stokke	(Italy) Camilla Scala (North Macedonia) Lina Gjorcheska	(Japan) Mayo Hibi (Japan) Miyu Kato (Australia) Priscilla Hon (Chile) Daniela Seguel
May 8	Changwon, South Korea; Hard $25,000; Singles and doubles draws	(United Kingdom) Gabriella Taylor; 6–2, 6–2	(United States) Danielle Lao	(South Korea) Han Na-lae (South Korea) Kim Na-ri	(United Kingdom) Freya Christie (Italy) Martina Caregaro (South Korea) Jeong Su-nam (Thailand) Luksika Kumkhum
May 8	Changwon, South Korea; Hard $25,000; Singles and doubles draws	(South Korea) Hong Seung-yeon (South Korea) Kang Seo-kyung; 6–4, 6–3	(South Korea) Choi Ji-hee (South Korea) Kim Na-ri	(South Korea) Han Na-lae (South Korea) Kim Na-ri	(United Kingdom) Freya Christie (Italy) Martina Caregaro (South Korea) Jeong Su-nam (Thailand) Luksika Kumkhum
May 8	Torneo Conchita Martínez; Monzón, Spain; Hard $25,000; Singles and doubles draws	(Spain) Georgina García Pérez; 6–1, 6–3	(Czech Republic) Marie Bouzková	(Spain) Yvonne Cavallé Reimers (Serbia) Dejana Radanović	(Bulgaria) Aleksandrina Naydenova (Spain) María Teresa Torró Flor (Belgium) Ysaline Bonaventure (Venezuela) Andrea Gámiz
May 8	Torneo Conchita Martínez; Monzón, Spain; Hard $25,000; Singles and doubles draws	(Venezuela) Andrea Gámiz (Spain) Georgina García Pérez; 6–3, 6–4	(Georgia (country)) Sofia Shapatava (Ukraine) Valeriya Strakhova	(Spain) Yvonne Cavallé Reimers (Serbia) Dejana Radanović	(Bulgaria) Aleksandrina Naydenova (Spain) María Teresa Torró Flor (Belgium) Ysaline Bonaventure (Venezuela) Andrea Gámiz
May 8	Hua Hin, Thailand; Hard $25,000; Singles and doubles draws	(Thailand) Peangtarn Plipuech; 6–4, 6–2	(United States) Jacqueline Cako	(United Kingdom) Harriet Dart (India) Karman Kaur Thandi	(Australia) Michaela Haet (Thailand) Nicha Lertpitaksinchai (Mexico) Giuliana Olmos (South Africa) Chanel Simmonds
May 8	Hua Hin, Thailand; Hard $25,000; Singles and doubles draws	(India) Ankita Raina (United Kingdom) Emily Webley-Smith; 6–2, 6–0	(Thailand) Nudnida Luangnam (China) Zhang Yukun	(United Kingdom) Harriet Dart (India) Karman Kaur Thandi	(Australia) Michaela Haet (Thailand) Nicha Lertpitaksinchai (Mexico) Giuliana Olmos (South Africa) Chanel Simmonds
May 8	Naples, United States; Clay $25,000; Singles and doubles draws	(United States) Claire Liu; 6–3, 6–1	(United States) Danielle Collins	(United States) Elizabeth Halbauer (United States) Kayla Day	(United States) Taylor Townsend (Canada) Carol Zhao (United States) Usue Maitane Arconada (Ukraine) Elizaveta Ianchuk
May 8	Naples, United States; Clay $25,000; Singles and doubles draws	(United States) Emina Bektas (United States) Sanaz Marand; 7–6^{(7–1)}, 6–1	(United States) Danielle Collins (United States) Taylor Townsend	(United States) Elizabeth Halbauer (United States) Kayla Day	(United States) Taylor Townsend (Canada) Carol Zhao (United States) Usue Maitane Arconada (Ukraine) Elizaveta Ianchuk
May 8	Hammamet, Tunisia; Clay $15,000; Singles and doubles draws	(Bosnia and Herzegovina) Jelena Simić; 7–6^{(7–1)}, 2–6, 6–4	(Belgium) Déborah Kerfs	(Sweden) Mirjam Björklund (Serbia) Natalija Kostić	(Italy) Francesca Sella (Serbia) Tijana Spasojević (Switzerland) Karin Kennel (Tunisia) Chiraz Bechri
May 8	Hammamet, Tunisia; Clay $15,000; Singles and doubles draws	(Australia) Naiktha Bains (Switzerland) Chiara Grimm; 4–6, 6–3, [10–4]	(Serbia) Natalija Kostić (Bosnia and Herzegovina) Jelena Simić	(Sweden) Mirjam Björklund (Serbia) Natalija Kostić	(Italy) Francesca Sella (Serbia) Tijana Spasojević (Switzerland) Karin Kennel (Tunisia) Chiraz Bechri
May 8	Antalya, Turkey; Clay $15,000; Singles and doubles draws	(Romania) Raluca Georgiana Șerban; 7–5, 6–2	(United States) Dasha Ivanova	(Argentina) Melany Solange Krywoj (Israel) Vlada Ekshibarova	(Kyrgyzstan) Ksenia Palkina (Bulgaria) Julia Stamatova (Chile) Bárbara Gatica (Germany) Tayisiya Morderger
May 8	Antalya, Turkey; Clay $15,000; Singles and doubles draws	(Ukraine) Maryna Chernyshova (Ukraine) Kateryna Sliusar; 6–2, 7–6^{(7–0)}	(Germany) Tayisiya Morderger (Germany) Yana Morderger	(Argentina) Melany Solange Krywoj (Israel) Vlada Ekshibarova	(Kyrgyzstan) Ksenia Palkina (Bulgaria) Julia Stamatova (Chile) Bárbara Gatica (Germany) Tayisiya Morderger
May 15	Empire Slovak Open; Trnava, Slovakia; Clay $100,000; Singles – Doubles	(Czech Republic) Markéta Vondroušová; 7–5, 7–6^{(7–3)}	(Paraguay) Verónica Cepede Royg	(Russia) Ekaterina Alexandrova (Russia) Anastasia Potapova	(Belgium) Yanina Wickmayer (United Kingdom) Heather Watson (Japan) Kurumi Nara (Ukraine) Kateryna Kozlova
May 15	Empire Slovak Open; Trnava, Slovakia; Clay $100,000; Singles – Doubles	(United Kingdom) Naomi Broady (United Kingdom) Heather Watson; 6–3, 6–2	(Chinese Taipei) Chuang Chia-jung (Czech Republic) Renata Voráčová	(Russia) Ekaterina Alexandrova (Russia) Anastasia Potapova	(Belgium) Yanina Wickmayer (United Kingdom) Heather Watson (Japan) Kurumi Nara (Ukraine) Kateryna Kozlova
May 15	Engie Open Saint-Gaudens Occitanie; Saint-Gaudens, France; Clay $60,000; Singles – Doubles	(Netherlands) Richèl Hogenkamp; 6–2, 6–4	(United States) Kristie Ahn	(Greece) Valentini Grammatikopoulou (Australia) Destanee Aiava	(Russia) Irina Khromacheva (Spain) Sílvia Soler Espinosa (Belarus) Aryna Sabalenka (Chinese Taipei) Hsieh Su-wei
May 15	Engie Open Saint-Gaudens Occitanie; Saint-Gaudens, France; Clay $60,000; Singles – Doubles	(Chinese Taipei) Chang Kai-chen (China) Han Xinyun; 7–5, 6–1	(Paraguay) Montserrat González (Spain) Sílvia Soler Espinosa	(Greece) Valentini Grammatikopoulou (Australia) Destanee Aiava	(Russia) Irina Khromacheva (Spain) Sílvia Soler Espinosa (Belarus) Aryna Sabalenka (Chinese Taipei) Hsieh Su-wei
May 15	Kurume U.S.E Cup; Kurume, Japan; Carpet $60,000; Singles – Doubles	(United Kingdom) Laura Robson; 6–3, 6–4	(United Kingdom) Katie Boulter	(Japan) Ayano Shimizu (Japan) Erina Hayashi	(Russia) Ksenia Lykina (Japan) Junri Namigata (Japan) Miharu Imanishi (Japan) Riko Sawayanagi
May 15	Kurume U.S.E Cup; Kurume, Japan; Carpet $60,000; Singles – Doubles	(United Kingdom) Katy Dunne (Australia) Tammi Patterson; 6–7^{(3–7)}, 6–2, [10–4]	(Japan) Erina Hayashi (Japan) Robu Kajitani	(Japan) Ayano Shimizu (Japan) Erina Hayashi	(Russia) Ksenia Lykina (Japan) Junri Namigata (Japan) Miharu Imanishi (Japan) Riko Sawayanagi
May 15	Qujing, China; Hard $25,000; Singles and doubles draws	(China) Gao Xinyu; 6–1, 3–6, 6–3	(Italy) Giulia Gatto-Monticone	(China) Wang Meiling (Chinese Taipei) Hsu Ching-wen	(China) Ye Qiuyu (China) Feng Shuo (China) Jiang Xinyu (Japan) Miyabi Inoue
May 15	Qujing, China; Hard $25,000; Singles and doubles draws	(China) Jiang Xinyu (China) Tang Qianhui; 6–4, 6–3	(China) Feng Shuo (China) Zhao Xiaoxi	(China) Wang Meiling (Chinese Taipei) Hsu Ching-wen	(China) Ye Qiuyu (China) Feng Shuo (China) Jiang Xinyu (Japan) Miyabi Inoue
May 15	Incheon, South Korea; Hard $25,000; Singles and doubles draws	(South Korea) Han Na-lae; 7–6^{(7–2)}, 7–5	(Thailand) Luksika Kumkhum	(Chinese Taipei) Lee Ya-hsuan (South Korea) Jeong Su-nam	(South Korea) Kim Na-ri (United States) Danielle Lao (Chinese Taipei) Lee Pei-chi (Mexico) Giuliana Olmos
May 15	Incheon, South Korea; Hard $25,000; Singles and doubles draws	(United States) Desirae Krawczyk (Mexico) Giuliana Olmos; 6–3, 2–6, [10–8]	(South Korea) Choi Ji-hee (South Korea) Kim Na-ri	(Chinese Taipei) Lee Ya-hsuan (South Korea) Jeong Su-nam	(South Korea) Kim Na-ri (United States) Danielle Lao (Chinese Taipei) Lee Pei-chi (Mexico) Giuliana Olmos
May 15	La Bisbal d'Empordà, Spain; Clay $25,000; Singles and doubles draws	(Spain) Georgina García Pérez; 6–2, 0–6, 6–4	(Spain) Estrella Cabeza Candela	(Russia) Veronika Kudermetova (Mexico) Renata Zarazúa	(Switzerland) Jil Teichmann (Spain) Irene Burillo Escorihuela (Spain) Olga Sáez Larra (Spain) Paula Badosa Gibert
May 15	La Bisbal d'Empordà, Spain; Clay $25,000; Singles and doubles draws	(Russia) Olesya Pervushina (Ukraine) Valeriya Strakhova; 7–5, 6–2	(Romania) Jaqueline Cristian (Mexico) Renata Zarazúa	(Russia) Veronika Kudermetova (Mexico) Renata Zarazúa	(Switzerland) Jil Teichmann (Spain) Irene Burillo Escorihuela (Spain) Olga Sáez Larra (Spain) Paula Badosa Gibert
May 15	Båstad, Sweden; Clay $25,000; Singles and doubles draws	(Romania) Irina Maria Bara; 7–6^{(8–6)}, 4–6, 6–2	(Liechtenstein) Kathinka von Deichmann	(Italy) Alice Matteucci (Poland) Magdalena Fręch	(Sweden) Cornelia Lister (Romania) Mihaela Buzărnescu (Italy) Georgia Brescia (Russia) Valentyna Ivakhnenko
May 15	Båstad, Sweden; Clay $25,000; Singles and doubles draws	(Belgium) An-Sophie Mestach (Belgium) Kimberley Zimmermann; 4–6, 6–2, [10–5]	(Belarus) Ilona Kremen (Sweden) Cornelia Lister	(Italy) Alice Matteucci (Poland) Magdalena Fręch	(Sweden) Cornelia Lister (Romania) Mihaela Buzărnescu (Italy) Georgia Brescia (Russia) Valentyna Ivakhnenko
May 15	Naples, United States; Clay $25,000; Singles and doubles draws	(Russia) Sofya Zhuk; 6–4, 7–6^{(7–3)}	(United States) Taylor Townsend	(United States) Usue Maitane Arconada (Portugal) Michelle Larcher de Brito	(United States) Sophie Chang (United States) Lauren Albanese (Canada) Katherine Sebov (Norway) Ulrikke Eikeri
May 15	Naples, United States; Clay $25,000; Singles and doubles draws	(United States) Emina Bektas (Chile) Alexa Guarachi; 6–3, 6–1	(United States) Sophie Chang (Norway) Ulrikke Eikeri	(United States) Usue Maitane Arconada (Portugal) Michelle Larcher de Brito	(United States) Sophie Chang (United States) Lauren Albanese (Canada) Katherine Sebov (Norway) Ulrikke Eikeri
May 15	Oeiras, Portugal; Clay $15,000; Singles and doubles draws	(Hungary) Panna Udvardy; 6–7^{(5–7)}, 7–5, 6–4	(Italy) Gaia Sanesi	(Germany) Romy Kölzer (Germany) Katharina Hering	(Spain) Alba Carrillo Marín (Portugal) Lúcia Quitério (Spain) Rosa Vicens Mas (Portugal) Inês Murta
May 15	Oeiras, Portugal; Clay $15,000; Singles and doubles draws	(Italy) Gaia Sanesi (Italy) Martina Spigarelli; 6–0, 6–2	(United Kingdom) Sarah Beth Grey (United Kingdom) Olivia Nicholls	(Germany) Romy Kölzer (Germany) Katharina Hering	(Spain) Alba Carrillo Marín (Portugal) Lúcia Quitério (Spain) Rosa Vicens Mas (Portugal) Inês Murta
May 15	Hammamet, Tunisia; Clay $15,000; Singles and doubles draws	(Serbia) Natalija Kostić; 6–2, 6–1	(Russia) Nika Kukharchuk	(Germany) Lisa Ponomar (Italy) Lucrezia Stefanini	(United Kingdom) Francesca Jones (France) Vinciane Rémy (Russia) Varvara Gracheva (Switzerland) Susan Bandecchi
May 15	Hammamet, Tunisia; Clay $15,000; Singles and doubles draws	(Serbia) Natalija Kostić (Bosnia and Herzegovina) Jelena Simić; 6–4, 6–4	(Germany) Lisa Ponomar (Italy) Dalila Spiteri	(Germany) Lisa Ponomar (Italy) Lucrezia Stefanini	(United Kingdom) Francesca Jones (France) Vinciane Rémy (Russia) Varvara Gracheva (Switzerland) Susan Bandecchi
May 15	Antalya, Turkey; Clay $15,000; Singles and doubles draws	(Russia) Varvara Flink; 6–4, 7–6^{(7–5)}	(Argentina) María Lourdes Carlé	(Greece) Despina Papamichail (Israel) Vlada Ekshibarova	(Ukraine) Maryna Chernyshova (Turkey) İpek Öz (Bolivia) Noelia Zeballos (Denmark) Emilie Francati
May 15	Antalya, Turkey; Clay $15,000; Singles and doubles draws	(Denmark) Emilie Francati (United States) Dasha Ivanova; 6–2, 6–4	(Croatia) Mariana Dražić (Uzbekistan) Arina Folts	(Greece) Despina Papamichail (Israel) Vlada Ekshibarova	(Ukraine) Maryna Chernyshova (Turkey) İpek Öz (Bolivia) Noelia Zeballos (Denmark) Emilie Francati
May 22	Jin'an Open; Lu'an, China; Hard $60,000; Singles – Doubles	(China) Zhu Lin; 6–3, 3–6, 6–4	(India) Ankita Raina	(United States) Danielle Lao (Georgia (country)) Sofia Shapatava	(Serbia) Jovana Jakšić (China) Guo Hanyu (China) Liu Fangzhou (China) Liu Chang
May 22	Jin'an Open; Lu'an, China; Hard $60,000; Singles – Doubles	(China) Jiang Xinyu (China) Tang Qianhui; 7–5, 6–4	(Japan) Mana Ayukawa (Japan) Erika Sema	(United States) Danielle Lao (Georgia (country)) Sofia Shapatava	(Serbia) Jovana Jakšić (China) Guo Hanyu (China) Liu Fangzhou (China) Liu Chang
May 22	Caserta, Italy; Clay $25,000; Singles and doubles draws	(United States) Claire Liu; 6–3, 6–3	(Spain) Paula Badosa Gibert	(Italy) Camilla Rosatello (Italy) Jessica Pieri	(Belgium) An-Sophie Mestach (Ukraine) Katarina Zavatska (Germany) Laura Schaeder (Romania) Andreea Mitu
May 22	Caserta, Italy; Clay $25,000; Singles and doubles draws	(Italy) Deborah Chiesa (Italy) Martina Colmegna; 7–6^{(7–5)}, 6–4	(Latvia) Diāna Marcinkēviča (Italy) Camilla Rosatello	(Italy) Camilla Rosatello (Italy) Jessica Pieri	(Belgium) An-Sophie Mestach (Ukraine) Katarina Zavatska (Germany) Laura Schaeder (Romania) Andreea Mitu
May 22	Karuizawa, Japan; Carpet $25,000; Singles and doubles draws	(Japan) Ayano Shimizu; 0–6, 6–4, 6–4	(Japan) Junri Namigata	(Australia) Tammi Patterson (Japan) Momoko Kobori	(Japan) Rika Fujiwara (Japan) Kanako Morisaki (Sweden) Ellen Allgurin (Japan) Risa Ushijima
May 22	Karuizawa, Japan; Carpet $25,000; Singles and doubles draws	(Japan) Chisa Hosonuma (Japan) Kanako Morisaki; 7–5, 6–3	(Japan) Ayaka Okuno (Australia) Tammi Patterson	(Australia) Tammi Patterson (Japan) Momoko Kobori	(Japan) Rika Fujiwara (Japan) Kanako Morisaki (Sweden) Ellen Allgurin (Japan) Risa Ushijima
May 22	Goyang, South Korea; Hard $25,000; Singles and doubles draws	(Thailand) Peangtarn Plipuech; 7–6^{(9–7)}, 6–0	(Japan) Mari Osaka	(Japan) Haruka Kaji (United States) Hanna Chang	(Australia) Masa Jovanovic (Chinese Taipei) Lee Ya-hsuan (Hong Kong) Zhang Ling (Mexico) Giuliana Olmos
May 22	Goyang, South Korea; Hard $25,000; Singles and doubles draws	(Thailand) Nicha Lertpitaksinchai (Thailand) Peangtarn Plipuech; 7–5, 6–4	(Australia) Genevieve Lorbergs (Australia) Olivia Tjandramulia	(Japan) Haruka Kaji (United States) Hanna Chang	(Australia) Masa Jovanovic (Chinese Taipei) Lee Ya-hsuan (Hong Kong) Zhang Ling (Mexico) Giuliana Olmos
May 22	Benavídez, Argentina; Hard $15,000; Singles and doubles draws	(Argentina) Catalina Pella; 6–4, 6–1	(Argentina) Stephanie Mariel Petit	(Mexico) Ana Sofía Sánchez (United States) Kariann Pierre-Louis	(Hungary) Naomi Totka (Argentina) Martina Capurro Taborda (Argentina) Julieta Lara Estable (United States) Shelby Talcott
May 22	Benavídez, Argentina; Hard $15,000; Singles and doubles draws	(Chile) Bárbara Gatica (Argentina) Stephanie Mariel Petit; 6–2, 7–6^{(7–1)}	(United States) Madison Bourguignon (Hungary) Naomi Totka	(Mexico) Ana Sofía Sánchez (United States) Kariann Pierre-Louis	(Hungary) Naomi Totka (Argentina) Martina Capurro Taborda (Argentina) Julieta Lara Estable (United States) Shelby Talcott
May 22	Santarém, Portugal; Hard $15,000; Singles and doubles draws	(Spain) Cristina Bucșa; 6–4, 6–4	(Russia) Valeria Savinykh	(Spain) María José Luque Moreno (Germany) Caroline Werner	(Ukraine) Valeriya Strakhova (Russia) Valeriya Zeleva (Czech Republic) Monika Kilnarová (Spain) Alba Carrillo Marín
May 22	Santarém, Portugal; Hard $15,000; Singles and doubles draws	(Russia) Valeria Savinykh (Ukraine) Valeriya Strakhova; 6–3, 6–2	(Spain) Cristina Bucșa (Russia) Ksenia Kuznetsova	(Spain) María José Luque Moreno (Germany) Caroline Werner	(Ukraine) Valeriya Strakhova (Russia) Valeriya Zeleva (Czech Republic) Monika Kilnarová (Spain) Alba Carrillo Marín
May 22	Hammamet, Tunisia; Clay $15,000; Singles and doubles draws	(Australia) Naiktha Bains; 6–4, 6–2	(Serbia) Natalija Kostić	(Brazil) Nathaly Kurata (Italy) Federica Arcidiacono	(France) Marie Témin (Italy) Dalila Spiteri (Bosnia and Herzegovina) Jelena Simić (Romania) Ioana Diana Pietroiu
May 22	Hammamet, Tunisia; Clay $15,000; Singles and doubles draws	(Australia) Naiktha Bains (Slovakia) Tereza Mihalíková; 4–6, 6–1, [10–5]	(Italy) Francesca Bullani (Italy) Veronica Napolitano	(Brazil) Nathaly Kurata (Italy) Federica Arcidiacono	(France) Marie Témin (Italy) Dalila Spiteri (Bosnia and Herzegovina) Jelena Simić (Romania) Ioana Diana Pietroiu
May 22	Antalya, Turkey; Clay $15,000; Singles and doubles draws	(Germany) Lisa Matviyenko; 6–3, 1–6, 7–5	(Romania) Georgia Andreea Crăciun	(Bulgaria) Julia Stamatova (Denmark) Emilie Francati	(Austria) Pia König (Sweden) Brenda Njuki (Ukraine) Maryna Chernyshova (Romania) Daiana Negreanu
May 22	Antalya, Turkey; Clay $15,000; Singles and doubles draws	(Romania) Georgia Andreea Crăciun (Romania) Ilona Georgiana Ghioroaie; 6–2, 6–4	(Croatia) Mariana Dražić (Denmark) Emilie Francati	(Bulgaria) Julia Stamatova (Denmark) Emilie Francati	(Austria) Pia König (Sweden) Brenda Njuki (Ukraine) Maryna Chernyshova (Romania) Daiana Negreanu
May 29	Wuhan City Vocational College Cup; Wuhan, China; Hard $25,000; Singles and doubles draws	(Serbia) Jovana Jakšić; 6–0, 3–6, 6–2	(China) Liu Fangzhou	(China) Lu Jingjing (Georgia (country)) Sofia Shapatava	(Japan) Mai Minokoshi (China) Lu Jiajing (Japan) Erika Sema (China) Xun Fangying
May 29	Wuhan City Vocational College Cup; Wuhan, China; Hard $25,000; Singles and doubles draws	(Australia) Alison Bai (China) Lu Jiajing; 6–2, 7–6^{(7–3)}	(China) Jiang Xinyu (China) Tang Qianhui	(China) Lu Jingjing (Georgia (country)) Sofia Shapatava	(Japan) Mai Minokoshi (China) Lu Jiajing (Japan) Erika Sema (China) Xun Fangying
May 29	Grado, Italy; Clay $25,000; Singles and doubles draws	(Slovakia) Anna Karolína Schmiedlová; 2–6, 6–2, 6–4	(Italy) Martina Trevisan	(Croatia) Tereza Mrdeža (Israel) Julia Glushko	(Italy) Stefania Rubini (Switzerland) Conny Perrin (Chile) Daniela Seguel (United States) Jennifer Elie
May 29	Grado, Italy; Clay $25,000; Singles and doubles draws	(Israel) Julia Glushko (Australia) Priscilla Hon; 7–5, 6–2	(Croatia) Tereza Mrdeža (Switzerland) Conny Perrin	(Croatia) Tereza Mrdeža (Israel) Julia Glushko	(Italy) Stefania Rubini (Switzerland) Conny Perrin (Chile) Daniela Seguel (United States) Jennifer Elie
May 29	Andijan, Uzbekistan; Hard $25,000; Singles and doubles draws	(Russia) Ksenia Lykina; 6–4, 3–6, 6–4	(Russia) Anastasia Frolova	(Uzbekistan) Akgul Amanmuradova (Russia) Anastasia Gasanova	(Georgia (country)) Mariam Bolkvadze (Russia) Olga Doroshina (Kazakhstan) Kamila Kerimbayeva (Ukraine) Olga Ianchuk
May 29	Andijan, Uzbekistan; Hard $25,000; Singles and doubles draws	(Russia) Olga Doroshina (Russia) Polina Monova; 6–2, 6–0	(Uzbekistan) Akgul Amanmuradova (Ukraine) Valeriya Strakhova	(Uzbekistan) Akgul Amanmuradova (Russia) Anastasia Gasanova	(Georgia (country)) Mariam Bolkvadze (Russia) Olga Doroshina (Kazakhstan) Kamila Kerimbayeva (Ukraine) Olga Ianchuk
May 29	Villa del Dique, Argentina; Clay $15,000; Singles and doubles draws	(United States) Quinn Gleason; 6–7^{(2–7)}, 6–3, 6–2	(Argentina) Victoria Bosio	(United States) Shelby Talcott (Argentina) Stephanie Mariel Petit	(United States) Stephanie Nemtsova (Mexico) Ana Sofía Sánchez (Argentina) Martina Capurro Taborda (Argentina) Guillermina Naya
May 29	Villa del Dique, Argentina; Clay $15,000; Singles and doubles draws	(Paraguay) Lara Escauriza (United States) Stephanie Nemtsova; 6–2, 6–3	(United States) Quinn Gleason (United States) Mara Schmidt	(United States) Shelby Talcott (Argentina) Stephanie Mariel Petit	(United States) Stephanie Nemtsova (Mexico) Ana Sofía Sánchez (Argentina) Martina Capurro Taborda (Argentina) Guillermina Naya
May 29	Montemor-o-Novo, Portugal; Hard $15,000; Singles and doubles draws	(Russia) Valeria Savinykh; 6–2, 6–0	(Germany) Sarah-Rebecca Sekulic	(Germany) Caroline Werner (Ukraine) Anastasiya Shoshyna	(Cambodia) Andrea Ka (United Kingdom) Maia Lumsden (Japan) Yukako Noi (Czech Republic) Monika Kilnarová
May 29	Montemor-o-Novo, Portugal; Hard $15,000; Singles and doubles draws	(Czech Republic) Monika Kilnarová (Russia) Valeriya Zeleva; 3–6, 7–5, [10–2]	(Portugal) Francisca Jorge (Portugal) Marta Oliveira	(Germany) Caroline Werner (Ukraine) Anastasiya Shoshyna	(Cambodia) Andrea Ka (United Kingdom) Maia Lumsden (Japan) Yukako Noi (Czech Republic) Monika Kilnarová
May 29	Niš, Serbia; Clay $15,000; Singles and doubles draws	(Slovakia) Sandra Jamrichová; 6–1, 3–0, retired	(Serbia) Milana Spremo	(Czech Republic) Simona Heinová (Greece) Despina Papamichail	(Slovakia) Kristína Schmiedlová (Ukraine) Alona Fomina (Hungary) Bianka Békefi (Serbia) Kristina Ostojić
May 29	Niš, Serbia; Clay $15,000; Singles and doubles draws	(Ukraine) Alona Fomina (Russia) Daria Kruzhkova; 6–0, 7–5	(India) Riya Bhatia (Australia) Angelique Svinos	(Czech Republic) Simona Heinová (Greece) Despina Papamichail	(Slovakia) Kristína Schmiedlová (Ukraine) Alona Fomina (Hungary) Bianka Békefi (Serbia) Kristina Ostojić
May 29	Sangju, South Korea; Hard $15,000; Singles and doubles draws	(South Korea) Jeong Su-nam; 6–2, 6–3	(South Korea) Choi Ji-hee	(South Korea) Lee So-ra (United States) Hanna Chang	(Switzerland) Karin Kennel (Australia) Olivia Tjandramulia (South Korea) Kim Sin-hee (South Korea) Ahn Yu-jin
May 29	Sangju, South Korea; Hard $15,000; Singles and doubles draws	(South Korea) Choi Ji-hee (South Korea) Kang Seo-kyung; 7–6^{(7–3)}, 6–3	(South Korea) Kim Da-bin (South Korea) Lee So-ra	(South Korea) Lee So-ra (United States) Hanna Chang	(Switzerland) Karin Kennel (Australia) Olivia Tjandramulia (South Korea) Kim Sin-hee (South Korea) Ahn Yu-jin
May 29	Hammamet, Tunisia; Clay $15,000; Singles and doubles draws	(Italy) Lucrezia Stefanini; 7–6^{(7–5)}, 6–2	(Greece) Eleni Kordolaimi	(Italy) Giorgia Marchetti (Belgium) Margaux Bovy	(Italy) Francesca Bullani (Brazil) Nathaly Kurata (Argentina) Valentina Abrile (Sweden) Kajsa Rinaldo Persson
May 29	Hammamet, Tunisia; Clay $15,000; Singles and doubles draws	(Slovakia) Barbara Kötelesová (Sweden) Kajsa Rinaldo Persson; 7–6^{(7–5)}, 4–6, [10–7]	(France) Victoria Muntean (Germany) Julia Wachaczyk	(Italy) Giorgia Marchetti (Belgium) Margaux Bovy	(Italy) Francesca Bullani (Brazil) Nathaly Kurata (Argentina) Valentina Abrile (Sweden) Kajsa Rinaldo Persson
May 29	Antalya, Turkey; Clay $15,000; Singles and doubles draws	(Colombia) Emiliana Arango; 6–2, 6–3	(Israel) Vlada Ekshibarova	(Romania) Georgia Andreea Crăciun (Austria) Karoline Kurz	(Germany) Lisa-Marie Mätschke (Russia) Yulia Kulikova (Austria) Pia König (Argentina) Melany Solange Krywoj
May 29	Antalya, Turkey; Clay $15,000; Singles and doubles draws	(Romania) Georgia Andreea Crăciun (Romania) Ilona Georgiana Ghioroaie; Walkover	(Croatia) Ena Kajević (Bolivia) Noelia Zeballos	(Romania) Georgia Andreea Crăciun (Austria) Karoline Kurz	(Germany) Lisa-Marie Mätschke (Russia) Yulia Kulikova (Austria) Pia König (Argentina) Melany Solange Krywoj

=== June ===
Week of	Tournament	Winner	Runners-up	Semifinalists	Quarterfinalists
June 5	Open Féminin de Marseille; Marseille, France; Clay $100,000; Singles – Doubles	(Italy) Jasmine Paolini; 6–4, 2–6, 6–1	(Germany) Tatjana Maria	(United States) Kayla Day (Hungary) Dalma Gálfi	(Spain) Sílvia Soler Espinosa (France) Priscilla Heise (Ukraine) Anhelina Kalinina (Czech Republic) Denisa Allertová
June 5	Open Féminin de Marseille; Marseille, France; Clay $100,000; Singles – Doubles	(Russia) Natela Dzalamidze (Russia) Veronika Kudermetova; 7–6^{(7–5)}, 6–4	(Hungary) Dalma Gálfi (Slovenia) Dalila Jakupović	(United States) Kayla Day (Hungary) Dalma Gálfi	(Spain) Sílvia Soler Espinosa (France) Priscilla Heise (Ukraine) Anhelina Kalinina (Czech Republic) Denisa Allertová
June 5	Aegon Surbiton Trophy; Surbiton, United Kingdom; Grass $100,000; Singles – Doubles	(Slovakia) Magdaléna Rybáriková; 6–4, 7–5	(United Kingdom) Heather Watson	(France) Océane Dodin (United Kingdom) Harriet Dart	(United Kingdom) Naomi Broady (Russia) Evgeniya Rodina (Czech Republic) Karolína Muchová (United Kingdom) Katy Dunne
June 5	Aegon Surbiton Trophy; Surbiton, United Kingdom; Grass $100,000; Singles – Doubles	(Australia) Monique Adamczak (Australia) Storm Sanders; 7–5, 6–4	(Chinese Taipei) Chang Kai-chen (New Zealand) Marina Erakovic	(France) Océane Dodin (United Kingdom) Harriet Dart	(United Kingdom) Naomi Broady (Russia) Evgeniya Rodina (Czech Republic) Karolína Muchová (United Kingdom) Katy Dunne
June 5	Internazionali Femminili di Brescia; Brescia, Italy; Clay $60,000; Singles – Doubles	(Slovenia) Polona Hercog; 6–2, 7–5	(Ukraine) Ganna Poznikhirenko	(Venezuela) Andrea Gámiz (Italy) Stefania Rubini	(Italy) Martina Caregaro (Italy) Cristiana Ferrando (Chile) Daniela Seguel (Argentina) Catalina Pella
June 5	Internazionali Femminili di Brescia; Brescia, Italy; Clay $60,000; Singles – Doubles	(Israel) Julia Glushko (Australia) Priscilla Hon; 2–6, 7–6^{(7–4)}, [10–8]	(Paraguay) Montserrat González (Belarus) Ilona Kremen	(Venezuela) Andrea Gámiz (Italy) Stefania Rubini	(Italy) Martina Caregaro (Italy) Cristiana Ferrando (Chile) Daniela Seguel (Argentina) Catalina Pella
June 5	Staré Splavy, Czech Republic; Clay $25,000; Singles and doubles draws	(Slovakia) Anna Karolína Schmiedlová; 6–4, 7–5	(Belarus) Vera Lapko	(Slovakia) Viktória Kužmová (Slovakia) Chantal Škamlová	(Germany) Tayisiya Morderger (Czech Republic) Anastasia Zarycká (Romania) Laura-Ioana Andrei (Slovakia) Lenka Juríková
June 5	Staré Splavy, Czech Republic; Clay $25,000; Singles and doubles draws	(Romania) Laura-Ioana Andrei (Czech Republic) Anastasia Zarycká; 6–3, 6–4	(Germany) Tayisiya Morderger (Germany) Yana Morderger	(Slovakia) Viktória Kužmová (Slovakia) Chantal Škamlová	(Germany) Tayisiya Morderger (Czech Republic) Anastasia Zarycká (Romania) Laura-Ioana Andrei (Slovakia) Lenka Juríková
June 5	Bredeney Ladies Open; Essen, Germany; Clay $25,000; Singles and doubles draws	(Estonia) Kaia Kanepi; 6–3, 6–7^{(5–7)}, 2–0, retired	(Switzerland) Patty Schnyder	(Germany) Romy Kölzer (Germany) Katharina Gerlach	(Liechtenstein) Kathinka von Deichmann (Belgium) Kimberley Zimmermann (Russia) Marina Melnikova (Sweden) Rebecca Peterson
June 5	Bredeney Ladies Open; Essen, Germany; Clay $25,000; Singles and doubles draws	(Germany) Carolin Daniels (Belarus) Lidziya Marozava; 6–1, 6–4	(Bosnia and Herzegovina) Anita Husarić (Belgium) Kimberley Zimmermann	(Germany) Romy Kölzer (Germany) Katharina Gerlach	(Liechtenstein) Kathinka von Deichmann (Belgium) Kimberley Zimmermann (Russia) Marina Melnikova (Sweden) Rebecca Peterson
June 5	Tokyo, Japan; Hard $25,000; Singles and doubles draws	(Australia) Tammi Patterson; 6–3, 6–2	(Thailand) Peangtarn Plipuech	(Japan) Makoto Ninomiya (Japan) Erika Sema	(Japan) Ayano Shimizu (Japan) Mai Minokoshi (Japan) Shuko Aoyama (Japan) Miharu Imanishi
June 5	Tokyo, Japan; Hard $25,000; Singles and doubles draws	(Japan) Rika Fujiwara (Japan) Kyōka Okamura; 6–2, 6–0	(Japan) Momoko Kobori (Japan) Kotomi Takahata	(Japan) Makoto Ninomiya (Japan) Erika Sema	(Japan) Ayano Shimizu (Japan) Mai Minokoshi (Japan) Shuko Aoyama (Japan) Miharu Imanishi
June 5	Figueira da Foz, Portugal; Hard $25,000+H; Singles and doubles draws	(Spain) María Teresa Torró Flor; 6–4, 6–2	(Germany) Sarah-Rebecca Sekulic	(Mexico) Victoria Rodríguez (Spain) Paula Badosa Gibert	(France) Clémence Fayol (Belgium) Britt Geukens (Serbia) Jovana Jakšić (Spain) Estrella Cabeza Candela
June 5	Figueira da Foz, Portugal; Hard $25,000+H; Singles and doubles draws	(Turkey) Ayla Aksu (Romania) Raluca Georgiana Șerban; 6-4, 6-1	(Colombia) María Fernanda Herazo (Mexico) Victoria Rodríguez	(Mexico) Victoria Rodríguez (Spain) Paula Badosa Gibert	(France) Clémence Fayol (Belgium) Britt Geukens (Serbia) Jovana Jakšić (Spain) Estrella Cabeza Candela
June 5	Bethany Beach, United States; Clay $25,000; Singles and doubles draws	(United States) Danielle Collins; 6–1, 6–0	(United States) Lauren Embree	(United States) Alexandra Mueller (United States) Ashley Kratzer	(United States) Sophie Chang (Papua New Guinea) Abigail Tere-Apisah (United States) Maria Mateas (United States) Raveena Kingsley
June 5	Bethany Beach, United States; Clay $25,000; Singles and doubles draws	(United States) Sabrina Santamaria (Papua New Guinea) Abigail Tere-Apisah; 6–4, 6–0	(United States) Sophie Chang (United States) Alexandra Mueller	(United States) Alexandra Mueller (United States) Ashley Kratzer	(United States) Sophie Chang (Papua New Guinea) Abigail Tere-Apisah (United States) Maria Mateas (United States) Raveena Kingsley
June 5	Namangan, Uzbekistan; Hard $25,000; Singles and doubles draws	(Russia) Polina Monova; 1–6, 6–1, 6–2	(Kazakhstan) Gozal Ainitdinova	(Russia) Anna Morgina (India) Karman Kaur Thandi	(Russia) Anastasia Frolova (Russia) Ksenia Lykina (Uzbekistan) Nigina Abduraimova (France) Estelle Cascino
June 5	Namangan, Uzbekistan; Hard $25,000; Singles and doubles draws	(Russia) Olga Doroshina (Russia) Polina Monova; 6–2, 7–6^{(10–8)}	(Uzbekistan) Nigina Abduraimova (Russia) Ksenia Lykina	(Russia) Anna Morgina (India) Karman Kaur Thandi	(Russia) Anastasia Frolova (Russia) Ksenia Lykina (Uzbekistan) Nigina Abduraimova (France) Estelle Cascino
June 5	Minsk, Belarus; Clay $15,000; Singles and doubles draws	(Russia) Daria Kruzhkova; 7–6^{(7–3)}, 6–3	(Uzbekistan) Albina Khabibulina	(Switzerland) Karin Kennel (Moldova) Anastasia Dețiuc	(Russia) Elina Nepliy (Russia) Anna Ukolova (Russia) Daria Lodikova (Russia) Kristina Sorokolet
June 5	Minsk, Belarus; Clay $15,000; Singles and doubles draws	(Russia) Sofia Dmitrieva (Belarus) Shalimar Talbi; 6–2, 7–6^{(8–6)}	(Belarus) Viktoryia Mun (Belarus) Vera Sakalouskaya	(Switzerland) Karin Kennel (Moldova) Anastasia Dețiuc	(Russia) Elina Nepliy (Russia) Anna Ukolova (Russia) Daria Lodikova (Russia) Kristina Sorokolet
June 5	Banja Luka, Bosnia and Herzegovina; Clay $15,000; Singles and doubles draws	(Turkey) Berfu Cengiz; 6–4, 3–6, 6–3	(Slovenia) Nina Potočnik	(Moldova) Anastasia Vdovenco (Slovakia) Kristína Schmiedlová	(Serbia) Katarina Jokić (India) Riya Bhatia (Romania) Irina Fetecău (Hungary) Bianka Békefi
June 5	Banja Luka, Bosnia and Herzegovina; Clay $15,000; Singles and doubles draws	(Turkey) Berfu Cengiz (Bulgaria) Ani Vangelova; 7–5, 7–6^{(7–4)}	(India) Riya Bhatia (Serbia) Tamara Čurović	(Moldova) Anastasia Vdovenco (Slovakia) Kristína Schmiedlová	(Serbia) Katarina Jokić (India) Riya Bhatia (Romania) Irina Fetecău (Hungary) Bianka Békefi
June 5	Aurangabad, India; Clay $15,000; Singles and doubles draws	(India) Rutuja Bhosale; 6–4, 6–4	(India) Mahak Jain	(India) Ramya Natarjan (India) Nidhi Chilumula	(India) Shweta Chandra Rana (India) Yubarani Banerjee (India) Pranjala Yadlapalli (China) Zhao Xiaoxi
June 5	Aurangabad, India; Clay $15,000; Singles and doubles draws	(India) Pranjala Yadlapalli (China) Zhao Xiaoxi; 2–6, 6–3, [10–4]	(India) Rutuja Bhosale (India) Kanika Vaidya	(India) Ramya Natarjan (India) Nidhi Chilumula	(India) Shweta Chandra Rana (India) Yubarani Banerjee (India) Pranjala Yadlapalli (China) Zhao Xiaoxi
June 5	Gimcheon, South Korea; Hard $15,000; Singles and doubles draws	(South Korea) Jeong Su-nam; 6–3, 3–6, 6–2	(South Korea) Choi Ji-hee	(South Korea) Park Sang-hee (Thailand) Patcharin Cheapchandej	(South Korea) Lee So-ra (United States) Hanna Chang (United Kingdom) Suzy Larkin (India) Prerna Bhambri
June 5	Gimcheon, South Korea; Hard $15,000; Singles and doubles draws	(South Korea) Han Sung-hee (South Korea) Hong Seung-yeon; 3–6, 6–4, [10–5]	(South Korea) Kim Da-bin (South Korea) Lee So-ra	(South Korea) Park Sang-hee (Thailand) Patcharin Cheapchandej	(South Korea) Lee So-ra (United States) Hanna Chang (United Kingdom) Suzy Larkin (India) Prerna Bhambri
June 5	Madrid, Spain; Clay $15,000; Singles and doubles draws	(Spain) Rocío de la Torre Sánchez; 6–1, 6–1	(Spain) Guiomar Maristany	(Switzerland) Tess Sugnaux (Spain) Rosa Vicens Mas	(Italy) Gaia Sanesi (Spain) Irene Burillo Escorihuela (Spain) Marina Bassols Ribera (Israel) Vlada Ekshibarova
June 5	Madrid, Spain; Clay $15,000; Singles and doubles draws	(Belgium) Michaela Boev (Italy) Gaia Sanesi; 6–4, 6–3	(Spain) Ángela Fita Boluda (Russia) Ksenia Kuznetsova	(Switzerland) Tess Sugnaux (Spain) Rosa Vicens Mas	(Italy) Gaia Sanesi (Spain) Irene Burillo Escorihuela (Spain) Marina Bassols Ribera (Israel) Vlada Ekshibarova
June 5	Hammamet, Tunisia; Clay $15,000; Singles and doubles draws	(Australia) Seone Mendez; 6–2, 6–1	(Chile) Fernanda Brito	(France) Alice Ramé (Greece) Eleni Kordolaimi	(United States) Anastasia Nefedova (Italy) Verena Hofer (Brazil) Nathaly Kurata (Sweden) Kajsa Rinaldo Persson
June 5	Hammamet, Tunisia; Clay $15,000; Singles and doubles draws	(Chinese Taipei) Hsieh Shu-ying (Chinese Taipei) Wu Fang-hsien; 5–7, 6–3, [11–9]	(Chile) Fernanda Brito (Bolivia) Noelia Zeballos	(France) Alice Ramé (Greece) Eleni Kordolaimi	(United States) Anastasia Nefedova (Italy) Verena Hofer (Brazil) Nathaly Kurata (Sweden) Kajsa Rinaldo Persson
June 12	Aegon Manchester Trophy; Manchester, United Kingdom; Grass $100,000; Singles – Doubles	(Kazakhstan) Zarina Diyas; 6–4, 6–4	(Serbia) Aleksandra Krunić	(United Kingdom) Naomi Broady (Belarus) Aryna Sabalenka	(Chinese Taipei) Chang Kai-chen (Poland) Magdalena Fręch (Russia) Anna Blinkova (United Kingdom) Gabriella Taylor
June 12	Aegon Manchester Trophy; Manchester, United Kingdom; Grass $100,000; Singles – Doubles	(Poland) Magdalena Fręch (Belgium) An-Sophie Mestach; 6–4, 7–6^{(7–5)}	(Chinese Taipei) Chang Kai-chen (New Zealand) Marina Erakovic	(United Kingdom) Naomi Broady (Belarus) Aryna Sabalenka	(Chinese Taipei) Chang Kai-chen (Poland) Magdalena Fręch (Russia) Anna Blinkova (United Kingdom) Gabriella Taylor
June 12	XIXO Ladies Open Hódmezövásárhely; Hódmezővásárhely, Hungary; Clay $60,000; Singles – Doubles	(Romania) Mihaela Buzărnescu; 6–2, 6–1	(Montenegro) Danka Kovinić	(Russia) Alexandra Panova (Serbia) Olga Danilović	(Croatia) Tereza Mrdeža (Romania) Alexandra Cadanțu (Austria) Barbara Haas (Hungary) Dalma Gálfi
June 12	XIXO Ladies Open Hódmezövásárhely; Hódmezővásárhely, Hungary; Clay $60,000; Singles – Doubles	(Japan) Kotomi Takahata (India) Prarthana Thombare; 1–0, retired	(Norway) Ulrikke Eikeri (Croatia) Tereza Mrdeža	(Russia) Alexandra Panova (Serbia) Olga Danilović	(Croatia) Tereza Mrdeža (Romania) Alexandra Cadanțu (Austria) Barbara Haas (Hungary) Dalma Gálfi
June 12	Barcelona Women World Winner; Barcelona, Spain; Clay $60,000; Singles – Doubles	(Chile) Daniela Seguel; 3–6, 7–6^{(7–5)}, 7–6^{(7–3)}	(France) Amandine Hesse	(Japan) Eri Hozumi (United States) Usue Maitane Arconada	(Turkey) Başak Eraydın (Venezuela) Andrea Gámiz (United States) Jennifer Elie (Spain) Paula Badosa Gibert
June 12	Barcelona Women World Winner; Barcelona, Spain; Clay $60,000; Singles – Doubles	(Paraguay) Montserrat González (Spain) Sílvia Soler Espinosa; 6–4, 6–3	(Israel) Julia Glushko (Australia) Priscilla Hon	(Japan) Eri Hozumi (United States) Usue Maitane Arconada	(Turkey) Başak Eraydın (Venezuela) Andrea Gámiz (United States) Jennifer Elie (Spain) Paula Badosa Gibert
June 12	Padua, Italy; Clay $25,000; Singles and doubles draws	(Sweden) Rebecca Peterson; 5–7, 6–1, 6–4	(Ukraine) Anastasiya Vasylyeva	(United States) Bernarda Pera (Italy) Alice Matteucci	(Croatia) Ana Vrljić (Czech Republic) Jesika Malečková (Brazil) Gabriela Cé (Italy) Martina Caregaro
June 12	Padua, Italy; Clay $25,000; Singles and doubles draws	(Italy) Cristiana Ferrando (Italy) Alice Matteucci; 2–6, 6–0, [11–9]	(Brazil) Gabriela Cé (Argentina) Catalina Pella	(United States) Bernarda Pera (Italy) Alice Matteucci	(Croatia) Ana Vrljić (Czech Republic) Jesika Malečková (Brazil) Gabriela Cé (Italy) Martina Caregaro
June 12	Kōfu, Japan; Hard $25,000; Singles and doubles draws	(Japan) Haruka Kaji; 6–1, 6–3	(Australia) Olivia Tjandramulia	(Japan) Erika Sema (Japan) Miharu Imanishi	(Australia) Michaela Haet (Japan) Yuuki Tanaka (Australia) Alexandra Bozovic (Japan) Erina Hayashi
June 12	Kōfu, Japan; Hard $25,000; Singles and doubles draws	(Japan) Rika Fujiwara (Japan) Kyōka Okamura; 7–6^{(7–4)}, 6–3	(Japan) Hiroko Kuwata (Japan) Riko Sawayanagi	(Japan) Erika Sema (Japan) Miharu Imanishi	(Australia) Michaela Haet (Japan) Yuuki Tanaka (Australia) Alexandra Bozovic (Japan) Erina Hayashi
June 12	Sumter, United States; Hard $25,000; Singles and doubles draws	(United States) Ashley Lahey; 6–3, 7–6^{(7–4)}	(United States) Francesca Di Lorenzo	(Chinese Taipei) Hsu Chieh-yu (United States) Robin Anderson	(United States) Julia Elbaba (United States) Ashley Kratzer (South Africa) Chanel Simmonds (United States) Allie Kiick
June 12	Sumter, United States; Hard $25,000; Singles and doubles draws	(United States) Kaitlyn Christian (Mexico) Giuliana Olmos; 6–2, 3–6, [10–7]	(Australia) Ellen Perez (Brazil) Luisa Stefani	(Chinese Taipei) Hsu Chieh-yu (United States) Robin Anderson	(United States) Julia Elbaba (United States) Ashley Kratzer (South Africa) Chanel Simmonds (United States) Allie Kiick
June 12	Minsk, Belarus; Clay $15,000; Singles and doubles draws	(Belarus) Iryna Shymanovich; 6–1, 4–6, 6–2	(Belarus) Ilona Kremen	(Belgium) Margaux Bovy (Russia) Margarita Skryabina	(Belarus) Shalimar Talbi (Belarus) Sadafmoh Tolibova (Russia) Aleksandra Vostrikova (Moldova) Anastasia Dețiuc
June 12	Minsk, Belarus; Clay $15,000; Singles and doubles draws	(Belarus) Ilona Kremen (Russia) Daria Kruzhkova; 6–0, 6–3	(Belarus) Viktoryia Mun (Belarus) Vera Sakalouskaya	(Belgium) Margaux Bovy (Russia) Margarita Skryabina	(Belarus) Shalimar Talbi (Belarus) Sadafmoh Tolibova (Russia) Aleksandra Vostrikova (Moldova) Anastasia Dețiuc
June 12	Přerov, Czech Republic; Clay $15,000; Singles and doubles draws	(Slovakia) Lenka Juríková; 6–4, 6–4	(Czech Republic) Miriam Kolodziejová	(Czech Republic) Monika Kilnarová (Czech Republic) Aneta Kladivová	(Russia) Anna Morgina (Czech Republic) Diana Šumová (Austria) Nicole Rottmann (Czech Republic) Vendula Žovincová
June 12	Přerov, Czech Republic; Clay $15,000; Singles and doubles draws	(Czech Republic) Dagmar Dudláková (Czech Republic) Miriam Kolodziejová; 6–1, 6–3	(Czech Republic) Tereza Janatová (Czech Republic) Natálie Novotná	(Czech Republic) Monika Kilnarová (Czech Republic) Aneta Kladivová	(Russia) Anna Morgina (Czech Republic) Diana Šumová (Austria) Nicole Rottmann (Czech Republic) Vendula Žovincová
June 12	Guimarães, Portugal; Hard $15,000; Singles and doubles draws	(Switzerland) Lara Michel; 6–3, 6–1	(Spain) Marta Huqi González Encinas	(Portugal) Maria João Koehler (France) Mathilde Armitano	(Japan) Yuriko Miyazaki (France) Clémence Fayol (Portugal) Maria Inês Fonte (Chinese Taipei) Joanna Garland
June 12	Guimarães, Portugal; Hard $15,000; Singles and doubles draws	(Netherlands) Arianne Hartono (Japan) Yuriko Miyazaki; 7–5, 6–0	(Italy) Maria Masini (Spain) Olga Parres Azcoitia	(Portugal) Maria João Koehler (France) Mathilde Armitano	(Japan) Yuriko Miyazaki (France) Clémence Fayol (Portugal) Maria Inês Fonte (Chinese Taipei) Joanna Garland
June 12	Curtea de Argeș, Romania; Clay $15,000; Singles and doubles draws	(Romania) Georgia Andreea Crăciun; 6–1, 6–1	(India) Riya Bhatia	(Romania) Miriam Bianca Bulgaru (Germany) Katharina Hering	(Romania) Oana Georgeta Simion (Romania) Irina Fetecău (Romania) Andreea Amalia Roșca (Romania) Tania Andrada Mare
June 12	Curtea de Argeș, Romania; Clay $15,000; Singles and doubles draws	(Romania) Georgia Andreea Crăciun (Romania) Ilona Georgiana Ghioroaie; 6–3, 7–5	(Romania) Camelia Hristea (Romania) Gabriela Nicole Tătăruș	(Romania) Miriam Bianca Bulgaru (Germany) Katharina Hering	(Romania) Oana Georgeta Simion (Romania) Irina Fetecău (Romania) Andreea Amalia Roșca (Romania) Tania Andrada Mare
June 12	Infond Open; Maribor, Slovenia; Clay $15,000; Singles and doubles draws	(Slovenia) Kaja Juvan; 6–4, 6–2	(Slovenia) Nina Potočnik	(Slovenia) Nastja Kolar (Slovenia) Pia Čuk	(Germany) Laura Schaeder (Slovakia) Jana Jablonovská (Bulgaria) Julia Stamatova (Australia) Angelique Svinos
June 12	Infond Open; Maribor, Slovenia; Clay $15,000; Singles and doubles draws	(Croatia) Mia Jurašić (Italy) Giulia Pairone; 6–3, 4–6, [10–7]	(Slovakia) Jana Jablonovská (Austria) Marlies Szupper	(Slovenia) Nastja Kolar (Slovenia) Pia Čuk	(Germany) Laura Schaeder (Slovakia) Jana Jablonovská (Bulgaria) Julia Stamatova (Australia) Angelique Svinos
June 12	Gimcheon, South Korea; Hard $15,000; Singles and doubles draws	(South Korea) Jeong Su-nam; 6–3, 6–1	(South Korea) Han Sung-hee	(Japan) Mizuno Kijima (Thailand) Nudnida Luangnam	(South Korea) Lee So-ra (South Korea) Choi Ji-hee (United States) Hanna Chang (South Korea) Hong Seung-yeon
June 12	Gimcheon, South Korea; Hard $15,000; Singles and doubles draws	(South Korea) Choi Ji-hee (South Korea) Kang Seo-kyung; 6–4, 6–2	(South Korea) Kim Da-bin (South Korea) Lee So-ra	(Japan) Mizuno Kijima (Thailand) Nudnida Luangnam	(South Korea) Lee So-ra (South Korea) Choi Ji-hee (United States) Hanna Chang (South Korea) Hong Seung-yeon
June 12	Hammamet, Tunisia; Clay $15,000; Singles and doubles draws	(Australia) Seone Mendez; 6–1, 3–6, 6–0	(Spain) Andrea Lázaro García	(Belgium) Déborah Kerfs (Italy) Verena Hofer	(France) Marie Témin (Switzerland) Leonie Küng (Italy) Bianca Turati (France) Caroline Roméo
June 12	Hammamet, Tunisia; Clay $15,000; Singles and doubles draws	(Colombia) María Paulina Pérez (Colombia) Paula Andrea Pérez; 6–3, 6–3	(Brazil) Nathaly Kurata (Brazil) Eduarda Piai	(Belgium) Déborah Kerfs (Italy) Verena Hofer	(France) Marie Témin (Switzerland) Leonie Küng (Italy) Bianca Turati (France) Caroline Roméo
June 19	Aegon Ilkley Trophy; Ilkley, United Kingdom; Grass $100,000; Singles – Doubles	(Slovakia) Magdaléna Rybáriková; 7–5, 7–6^{(7–3)}	(Belgium) Alison Van Uytvanck	(New Zealand) Marina Erakovic (Germany) Andrea Petkovic	(Greece) Maria Sakkari (Belgium) Maryna Zanevska (Germany) Tatjana Maria (United States) Madison Brengle
June 19	Aegon Ilkley Trophy; Ilkley, United Kingdom; Grass $100,000; Singles – Doubles	(Russia) Anna Blinkova (Russia) Alla Kudryavtseva; 6–1, 6–4	(Poland) Paula Kania (Belgium) Maryna Zanevska	(New Zealand) Marina Erakovic (Germany) Andrea Petkovic	(Greece) Maria Sakkari (Belgium) Maryna Zanevska (Germany) Tatjana Maria (United States) Madison Brengle
June 19	TEB Kültürpark Cup; İzmir, Turkey; Hard $60,000; Singles – Doubles	(Romania) Mihaela Buzărnescu; 6–1, 6–0	(Japan) Eri Hozumi	(Bulgaria) Viktoriya Tomova (Turkey) Ayla Aksu	(Slovenia) Nastja Kolar (Belgium) An-Sophie Mestach (Georgia (country)) Sofia Shapatava (Serbia) Nina Stojanović
June 19	TEB Kültürpark Cup; İzmir, Turkey; Hard $60,000; Singles – Doubles	(Belgium) An-Sophie Mestach (Serbia) Nina Stojanović; 6–4, 7–5	(Finland) Emma Laine (Japan) Kotomi Takahata	(Bulgaria) Viktoriya Tomova (Turkey) Ayla Aksu	(Slovenia) Nastja Kolar (Belgium) An-Sophie Mestach (Georgia (country)) Sofia Shapatava (Serbia) Nina Stojanović
June 19	Open Montpellier Méditerranée Métropole Hérault; Montpellier, France; Clay $25,000+H; Singles and doubles draws	(Romania) Alexandra Dulgheru; 6–2, 6–2	(France) Shérazad Reix	(Switzerland) Rebeka Masarova (Mexico) Victoria Rodríguez	(France) Elixane Lechemia (France) Harmony Tan (France) Priscilla Heise (France) Marine Partaud
June 19	Open Montpellier Méditerranée Métropole Hérault; Montpellier, France; Clay $25,000+H; Singles and doubles draws	(Japan) Momoko Kobori (Japan) Ayano Shimizu; 6–3, 4–6, [10–7]	(Brazil) Laura Pigossi (Mexico) Victoria Rodríguez	(Switzerland) Rebeka Masarova (Mexico) Victoria Rodríguez	(France) Elixane Lechemia (France) Harmony Tan (France) Priscilla Heise (France) Marine Partaud
June 19	Baja, Hungary; Clay $25,000; Singles and doubles draws	(Norway) Ulrikke Eikeri; 7–6^{(7–4)}, 6–2	(Slovakia) Chantal Škamlová	(Australia) Isabelle Wallace (Romania) Nicoleta Dascălu	(Israel) Deniz Khazaniuk (Australia) Zoe Hives (Slovakia) Tereza Mihalíková (Russia) Amina Anshba
June 19	Baja, Hungary; Clay $25,000; Singles and doubles draws	(Slovakia) Chantal Škamlová (Germany) Anna Zaja; 6–7^{(5–7)}, 6–1, [11–9]	(Hungary) Ágnes Bukta (Slovakia) Vivien Juhászová	(Australia) Isabelle Wallace (Romania) Nicoleta Dascălu	(Israel) Deniz Khazaniuk (Australia) Zoe Hives (Slovakia) Tereza Mihalíková (Russia) Amina Anshba
June 19	Warsaw, Poland; Clay $25,000+H; Singles and doubles draws	(Italy) Martina Trevisan; 6–2, 6–4	(Ukraine) Olga Ianchuk	(Bulgaria) Sesil Karatantcheva (Poland) Katarzyna Piter	(Bulgaria) Elitsa Kostova (Belarus) Vera Lapko (Croatia) Ani Mijačika (Ukraine) Ganna Poznikhirenko
June 19	Warsaw, Poland; Clay $25,000+H; Singles and doubles draws	(Australia) Priscilla Hon (Belarus) Vera Lapko; 7–6^{(7–3)}, 6–4	(Poland) Katarzyna Kawa (Poland) Katarzyna Piter	(Bulgaria) Sesil Karatantcheva (Poland) Katarzyna Piter	(Bulgaria) Elitsa Kostova (Belarus) Vera Lapko (Croatia) Ani Mijačika (Ukraine) Ganna Poznikhirenko
June 19	Ystad, Sweden; Clay $25,000; Singles and doubles draws	(Netherlands) Quirine Lemoine; 1–6, 6–4, 6–3	(Norway) Melanie Stokke	(Spain) María Teresa Torró Flor (Belgium) Ysaline Bonaventure	(Germany) Laura Schaeder (Italy) Giulia Gatto-Monticone (Mexico) Renata Zarazúa (Germany) Vivian Heisen
June 19	Ystad, Sweden; Clay $25,000; Singles and doubles draws	(Russia) Valentyna Ivakhnenko (Mexico) Renata Zarazúa; 6–3, 3–6, [10–5]	(Netherlands) Quirine Lemoine (Netherlands) Eva Wacanno	(Spain) María Teresa Torró Flor (Belgium) Ysaline Bonaventure	(Germany) Laura Schaeder (Italy) Giulia Gatto-Monticone (Mexico) Renata Zarazúa (Germany) Vivian Heisen
June 19	Lenzerheide, Switzerland; Clay $25,000; Singles and doubles draws	(Italy) Georgia Brescia; 0–6, 6–4, 7–6^{(7–1)}	(Switzerland) Simona Waltert	(Netherlands) Bibiane Schoofs (Argentina) Catalina Pella	(Slovenia) Dalila Jakupović (Russia) Alina Silich (Austria) Julia Grabher (Belgium) Elyne Boeykens
June 19	Lenzerheide, Switzerland; Clay $25,000; Singles and doubles draws	(Switzerland) Amra Sadiković (Switzerland) Nina Stadler; 2–6, 6–4, [10–1]	(Brazil) Gabriela Cé (Argentina) Catalina Pella	(Netherlands) Bibiane Schoofs (Argentina) Catalina Pella	(Slovenia) Dalila Jakupović (Russia) Alina Silich (Austria) Julia Grabher (Belgium) Elyne Boeykens
June 19	Baton Rouge, United States; Hard $25,000; Singles and doubles draws	(United States) Nicole Gibbs; 6–3, 6–3	(United States) Francesca Di Lorenzo	(United States) Victoria Duval (South Africa) Chanel Simmonds	(United States) Ashley Lahey (United States) Julia Elbaba (United States) Ashley Kratzer (United States) Quinn Gleason
June 19	Baton Rouge, United States; Hard $25,000; Singles and doubles draws	(Australia) Ellen Perez (Brazil) Luisa Stefani; 6–3, 6–4	(United States) Francesca Di Lorenzo (United States) Julia Elbaba	(United States) Victoria Duval (South Africa) Chanel Simmonds	(United States) Ashley Lahey (United States) Julia Elbaba (United States) Ashley Kratzer (United States) Quinn Gleason
June 19	Fergana Challenger; Fergana, Uzbekistan; Hard $25,000; Singles and doubles draws	(Uzbekistan) Sabina Sharipova; 6–4, 7–6^{(7–5)}	(Russia) Elena Rybakina	(Ukraine) Valeriya Strakhova (Uzbekistan) Nigina Abduraimova	(Kazakhstan) Gozal Ainitdinova (Russia) Anastasia Frolova (Kazakhstan) Kamila Kerimbayeva (Russia) Ksenia Lykina
June 19	Fergana Challenger; Fergana, Uzbekistan; Hard $25,000; Singles and doubles draws	(Uzbekistan) Nigina Abduraimova (Russia) Anastasia Frolova; 7–6^{(9–7)}, 7–5	(Russia) Ksenia Lykina (Uzbekistan) Sabina Sharipova	(Ukraine) Valeriya Strakhova (Uzbekistan) Nigina Abduraimova	(Kazakhstan) Gozal Ainitdinova (Russia) Anastasia Frolova (Kazakhstan) Kamila Kerimbayeva (Russia) Ksenia Lykina
June 19	Victoria, Canada; Hard (indoor) $15,000; Singles and doubles draws	(United States) Alexa Graham; 6–1, 6–4	(United States) Tori Kinard	(Canada) Rosie Johanson (Japan) Kana Daniel	(Mexico) Marcela Zacarías (Japan) Michika Ozeki (United States) Jessica Ho (Canada) Wendy Zhang
June 19	Victoria, Canada; Hard (indoor) $15,000; Singles and doubles draws	(Mexico) Andrea Renée Villarreal (Mexico) Marcela Zacarías; 7–5, 6–4	(United States) Frances Altick (United States) Alexa Graham	(Canada) Rosie Johanson (Japan) Kana Daniel	(Mexico) Marcela Zacarías (Japan) Michika Ozeki (United States) Jessica Ho (Canada) Wendy Zhang
June 19	Anning, China; Clay $15,000; Singles and doubles draws	(China) Sun Xuliu; 6–2, 7–6^{(7–5)}	(China) You Mizhuoma	(China) Zhao Xiaoxi (China) Guo Shanshan	(China) Ni Ma Zhuoma (China) Gai Ao (China) Wei Zhanlan (China) Mu Shouna
June 19	Anning, China; Clay $15,000; Singles and doubles draws	(China) Guo Shanshan (China) Sun Xuliu; 6–3, 6–3	(China) Du Zhima (China) Ni Ma Zhuoma	(China) Zhao Xiaoxi (China) Guo Shanshan	(China) Ni Ma Zhuoma (China) Gai Ao (China) Wei Zhanlan (China) Mu Shouna
June 19	Kaltenkirchen, Germany; Clay $15,000; Singles and doubles draws	(Germany) Katharina Gerlach; 6–4, 7–6^{(7–2)}	(Belgium) Magali Kempen	(Germany) Lisa Matviyenko (Germany) Eva Marie Voracek	(Brazil) Thaisa Grana Pedretti (Germany) Linda Prenkovic (Germany) Lisa Ponomar (Colombia) Camila Osorio
June 19	Kaltenkirchen, Germany; Clay $15,000; Singles and doubles draws	(Uzbekistan) Albina Khabibulina (Germany) Lisa Ponomar; 6–4, 6–0	(Australia) Gabriella Da Silva-Fick (Belgium) Magali Kempen	(Germany) Lisa Matviyenko (Germany) Eva Marie Voracek	(Brazil) Thaisa Grana Pedretti (Germany) Linda Prenkovic (Germany) Lisa Ponomar (Colombia) Camila Osorio
June 19	Herzliya, Israel; Hard $15,000; Singles and doubles draws	(France) Estelle Cascino; 3–6, 7–5, 4–1, retired	(Russia) Marta Paigina	(Israel) Ofri Lankri (Israel) Vlada Ekshibarova	(Sweden) Linnéa Malmqvist (France) Fiona Codino (Israel) Maya Tahan (Belarus) Sadafmoh Tolibova
June 19	Herzliya, Israel; Hard $15,000; Singles and doubles draws	(Israel) Shelly Krolitzky (Israel) Maya Tahan; 2–6, 6–0, [12–10]	(Russia) Sofia Dmitrieva (Sweden) Linnéa Malmqvist	(Israel) Ofri Lankri (Israel) Vlada Ekshibarova	(Sweden) Linnéa Malmqvist (France) Fiona Codino (Israel) Maya Tahan (Belarus) Sadafmoh Tolibova
June 19	Sassuolo, Italy; Clay $15,000; Singles and doubles draws	(Italy) Stefania Rubini; 5–7, 6–0, 6–4	(Italy) Federica Bilardo	(Italy) Deborah Chiesa (Italy) Beatrice Torelli	(Slovenia) Nina Potočnik (Italy) Anna Remondina (Greece) Eleni Kordolaimi (Bosnia and Herzegovina) Jelena Simić
June 19	Sassuolo, Italy; Clay $15,000; Singles and doubles draws	(Italy) Federica Arcidiacono (Italy) Martina Spigarelli; Walkover	(Argentina) Carla Lucero (Mexico) Ana Sofía Sánchez	(Italy) Deborah Chiesa (Italy) Beatrice Torelli	(Slovenia) Nina Potočnik (Italy) Anna Remondina (Greece) Eleni Kordolaimi (Bosnia and Herzegovina) Jelena Simić
June 19	Alkmaar, Netherlands; Clay $15,000; Singles and doubles draws	(Czech Republic) Michaela Bayerlová; 6–4, 6–2	(Germany) Laura Heinrichs	(Belgium) Eliessa Vanlangendonck (Spain) Meritxell Perera Ros	(Germany) Katharina Hering (Australia) Abbie Myers (Germany) Romy Kölzer (United States) Nikki Redelijk
June 19	Alkmaar, Netherlands; Clay $15,000; Singles and doubles draws	(Australia) Sally Peers (Netherlands) Rosalie van der Hoek; 6–3, 6–1	(Belarus) Sviatlana Pirazhenka (Netherlands) Erika Vogelsang	(Belgium) Eliessa Vanlangendonck (Spain) Meritxell Perera Ros	(Germany) Katharina Hering (Australia) Abbie Myers (Germany) Romy Kölzer (United States) Nikki Redelijk
June 19	Taipei, Taiwan; Hard $15,000; Singles and doubles draws	(Chinese Taipei) Lee Pei-chi; 3–6, 7–5, 6–2	(Japan) Haruka Kaji	(Japan) Junri Namigata (Japan) Risa Ushijima	(Australia) Alexandra Bozovic (Singapore) Stefanie Tan (Japan) Kyōka Okamura (Chinese Taipei) Lee Ya-hsin
June 19	Taipei, Taiwan; Hard $15,000; Singles and doubles draws	(Chinese Taipei) Cho I-hsuan (Chinese Taipei) Cho Yi-tsen; 6–2, 6–3	(Hong Kong) Eudice Chong (Hong Kong) Katherine Ip	(Japan) Junri Namigata (Japan) Risa Ushijima	(Australia) Alexandra Bozovic (Singapore) Stefanie Tan (Japan) Kyōka Okamura (Chinese Taipei) Lee Ya-hsin
June 19	Hammamet, Tunisia; Clay $15,000; Singles and doubles draws	(Chile) Fernanda Brito; 6–0, 6–2	(Italy) Bianca Turati	(Bolivia) Noelia Zeballos (Spain) Guiomar Maristany	(United States) Anastasia Nefedova (Spain) Andrea Lázaro García (Finland) Mia Eklund (Canada) Maria Patrascu
June 19	Hammamet, Tunisia; Clay $15,000; Singles and doubles draws	(Chile) Fernanda Brito (Bolivia) Noelia Zeballos; 6–1, 6–3	(Spain) Lucía de la Puerta Uribe (Spain) Guiomar Maristany	(Bolivia) Noelia Zeballos (Spain) Guiomar Maristany	(United States) Anastasia Nefedova (Spain) Andrea Lázaro García (Finland) Mia Eklund (Canada) Maria Patrascu
June 26	Aegon Southsea Trophy; Southsea, United Kingdom; Grass $100,000+H; Singles – Doubles	(Germany) Tatjana Maria; 6–2, 6–2	(Romania) Irina-Camelia Begu	(Russia) Ekaterina Alexandrova (Russia) Evgeniya Rodina	(Germany) Andrea Petkovic (United States) Julia Boserup (Japan) Kurumi Nara (United States) Jennifer Brady
June 26	Aegon Southsea Trophy; Southsea, United Kingdom; Grass $100,000+H; Singles – Doubles	(Japan) Shuko Aoyama (China) Yang Zhaoxuan; 6–7^{(7–9)}, 6–3, [10–8]	(Switzerland) Viktorija Golubic (Ukraine) Lyudmyla Kichenok	(Russia) Ekaterina Alexandrova (Russia) Evgeniya Rodina	(Germany) Andrea Petkovic (United States) Julia Boserup (Japan) Kurumi Nara (United States) Jennifer Brady
June 26	Périgueux, France; Clay $25,000; Singles and doubles draws	(Switzerland) Patty Schnyder; 6–4, 7–5	(Italy) Camilla Rosatello	(Japan) Mari Osaka (Spain) Olga Sáez Larra	(France) Jessika Ponchet (Mexico) Victoria Rodríguez (Belgium) Hélène Scholsen (France) Shérazad Reix
June 26	Périgueux, France; Clay $25,000; Singles and doubles draws	(Italy) Camilla Rosatello (Belgium) Kimberley Zimmermann; 6–4, 6–3	(France) Manon Arcangioli (France) Shérazad Reix	(Japan) Mari Osaka (Spain) Olga Sáez Larra	(France) Jessika Ponchet (Mexico) Victoria Rodríguez (Belgium) Hélène Scholsen (France) Shérazad Reix
June 26	Stuttgart, Germany; Clay $25,000; Singles and doubles draws	(United States) Bernarda Pera; 6–4, 6–4	(Germany) Anna Zaja	(Japan) Eri Hozumi (Austria) Julia Grabher	(Netherlands) Bibiane Schoofs (Switzerland) Rebeka Masarova (Argentina) Catalina Pella (Czech Republic) Petra Krejsová
June 26	Stuttgart, Germany; Clay $25,000; Singles and doubles draws	(Russia) Kseniia Bekker (Romania) Raluca Georgiana Șerban; 6–3, 5–7, [10–5]	(Germany) Laura Schaeder (Germany) Anna Zaja	(Japan) Eri Hozumi (Austria) Julia Grabher	(Netherlands) Bibiane Schoofs (Switzerland) Rebeka Masarova (Argentina) Catalina Pella (Czech Republic) Petra Krejsová
June 26	Bella Cup; Toruń, Poland; Clay $25,000+H; Singles and doubles draws	(Slovakia) Chantal Škamlová; 6–2, 4–6, 6–3	(Czech Republic) Miriam Kolodziejová	(Slovakia) Lenka Juríková (Australia) Priscilla Hon	(Germany) Sarah-Rebecca Sekulic (Belarus) Vera Lapko (Poland) Magdalena Fręch (Poland) Maja Chwalińska
June 26	Bella Cup; Toruń, Poland; Clay $25,000+H; Singles and doubles draws	(Belarus) Vera Lapko (Russia) Anna Morgina; 6–2, 6–3	(Czech Republic) Miriam Kolodziejová (Czech Republic) Jesika Malečková	(Slovakia) Lenka Juríková (Australia) Priscilla Hon	(Germany) Sarah-Rebecca Sekulic (Belarus) Vera Lapko (Poland) Magdalena Fręch (Poland) Maja Chwalińska
June 26	Lund, Sweden; Clay $25,000; Singles and doubles draws	(Italy) Martina Di Giuseppe; 6–4, 2–6, 6–2	(Hungary) Ágnes Bukta	(Bosnia and Herzegovina) Dea Herdželaš (Romania) Alexandra Dulgheru	(Belgium) Ysaline Bonaventure (Brazil) Laura Pigossi (Norway) Melanie Stokke (Sweden) Ida Jarlskog
June 26	Lund, Sweden; Clay $25,000; Singles and doubles draws	(Sweden) Ida Jarlskog (Sweden) Fanny Östlund; 6–2, 6–7^{(4–7)}, [14–12]	(Romania) Laura-Ioana Andrei (Germany) Julia Wachaczyk	(Bosnia and Herzegovina) Dea Herdželaš (Romania) Alexandra Dulgheru	(Belgium) Ysaline Bonaventure (Brazil) Laura Pigossi (Norway) Melanie Stokke (Sweden) Ida Jarlskog
June 26	Auburn, United States; Hard $25,000; Singles and doubles draws	(Japan) Miharu Imanishi; 6–3, 6–2	(United States) Nicole Gibbs	(Australia) Ellen Perez (Canada) Carol Zhao	(United States) Emina Bektas (United States) Ashley Lahey (Japan) Mayo Hibi (Australia) Olivia Rogowska
June 26	Auburn, United States; Hard $25,000; Singles and doubles draws	(United States) Emina Bektas (Chile) Alexa Guarachi; 4–6, 6–4, [10–5]	(Australia) Ellen Perez (Brazil) Luisa Stefani	(Australia) Ellen Perez (Canada) Carol Zhao	(United States) Emina Bektas (United States) Ashley Lahey (Japan) Mayo Hibi (Australia) Olivia Rogowska
June 26	De Haan, Belgium; Clay $15,000; Singles and doubles draws	(Germany) Lisa Ponomar; 6–4, 6–3	(France) Alice Ramé	(Czech Republic) Monika Kilnarová (Spain) Meritxell Perera Ros	(Belarus) Sviatlana Pirazhenka (Belgium) Eliessa Vanlangendonck (Serbia) Bojana Marinković (United Kingdom) Emily Arbuthnott
June 26	De Haan, Belgium; Clay $15,000; Singles and doubles draws	(Germany) Lisa-Marie Mätschke (Serbia) Bojana Marinković; 6–4, 3–6, [10–8]	(Japan) Rio Kitagawa (Belgium) Eliessa Vanlangendonck	(Czech Republic) Monika Kilnarová (Spain) Meritxell Perera Ros	(Belarus) Sviatlana Pirazhenka (Belgium) Eliessa Vanlangendonck (Serbia) Bojana Marinković (United Kingdom) Emily Arbuthnott
June 26	Anning, China; Clay $15,000; Singles and doubles draws	(China) Guo Shanshan; 6–4, 6–4	(Hong Kong) Eudice Chong	(China) Sun Xuliu (China) Kang Jiaqi	(China) Mu Shouna (Hong Kong) Zhang Ling (China) Li Yixuan (China) Ni Ma Zhuoma
June 26	Anning, China; Clay $15,000; Singles and doubles draws	(China) Sun Xuliu (China) Zang Jiaxue; 6–2, 6–4	(China) Feng Shuo (China) Kang Jiaqi	(China) Sun Xuliu (China) Kang Jiaqi	(China) Mu Shouna (Hong Kong) Zhang Ling (China) Li Yixuan (China) Ni Ma Zhuoma
June 26	Sharm El Sheikh, Egypt; Hard $15,000; Singles and doubles draws	(India) Pranjala Yadlapalli; 6–7^{(0–7)}, 7–5, 6–4	(Italy) Giada Clerici	(Russia) Ekaterina Yashina (Romania) Ana Bianca Mihăilă	(Slovakia) Tereza Mihalíková (Russia) Angelina Zhuravleva (Argentina) Martina Capurro Taborda (India) Kanika Vaidya
June 26	Sharm El Sheikh, Egypt; Hard $15,000; Singles and doubles draws	(India) Kanika Vaidya (Russia) Ekaterina Yashina; 6–2, 6–0	(Australia) Ella Husrefovic (Republic of Ireland) Jennifer Timotin	(Russia) Ekaterina Yashina (Romania) Ana Bianca Mihăilă	(Slovakia) Tereza Mihalíková (Russia) Angelina Zhuravleva (Argentina) Martina Capurro Taborda (India) Kanika Vaidya
June 26	Tel Aviv, Israel; Hard $15,000; Singles and doubles draws	(Greece) Despina Papamichail; 7–6^{(7–4)}, 6–3	(France) Estelle Cascino	(Israel) Valeria Nikolaev (Belarus) Anna Kubareva	(Hungary) Naomi Totka (Israel) Yarden Akler (Israel) Lina Glushko (Sweden) Linnéa Malmqvist
June 26	Tel Aviv, Israel; Hard $15,000; Singles and doubles draws	(France) Estelle Cascino (India) Kyra Shroff; 6–2, 6–4	(Sweden) Linnéa Malmqvist (Australia) Alexandra Walters	(Israel) Valeria Nikolaev (Belarus) Anna Kubareva	(Hungary) Naomi Totka (Israel) Yarden Akler (Israel) Lina Glushko (Sweden) Linnéa Malmqvist
June 26	Tarvisio, Italy; Clay $15,000; Singles and doubles draws	(Slovenia) Nina Potočnik; 6–2, 6–3	(Italy) Federica Bilardo	(Switzerland) Lisa Sabino (Greece) Eleni Kordolaimi	(Slovenia) Pia Čuk (Italy) Nastassja Burnett (Hungary) Szabina Szlavikovics (Slovenia) Manca Pislak
June 26	Tarvisio, Italy; Clay $15,000; Singles and doubles draws	(Italy) Federica Di Sarra (Switzerland) Lisa Sabino; 6–0, 6–3	(Argentina) Carla Lucero (Hungary) Szabina Szlavikovics	(Switzerland) Lisa Sabino (Greece) Eleni Kordolaimi	(Slovenia) Pia Čuk (Italy) Nastassja Burnett (Hungary) Szabina Szlavikovics (Slovenia) Manca Pislak
June 26	Bucharest, Romania; Clay $15,000; Singles and doubles draws	(Romania) Cristina Dinu; 6–3, 6–3	(Romania) Georgia Andreea Crăciun	(Moldova) Alexandra Perper (Romania) Nicoleta Dascălu	(Italy) Martina Colmegna (Spain) Rosa Vicens Mas (Romania) Miriam Bianca Bulgaru (Italy) Giorgia Marchetti
June 26	Bucharest, Romania; Clay $15,000; Singles and doubles draws	(Romania) Cristina Ene (Moldova) Alexandra Perper; 4–6, 6–3, [10–4]	(Romania) Elena Bogdan (Romania) Miriam Bianca Bulgaru	(Moldova) Alexandra Perper (Romania) Nicoleta Dascălu	(Italy) Martina Colmegna (Spain) Rosa Vicens Mas (Romania) Miriam Bianca Bulgaru (Italy) Giorgia Marchetti
June 26	Istanbul, Turkey; Clay $15,000; Singles and doubles draws	(United States) Sanaz Marand; 6–1, 6–4	(Turkey) Ayla Aksu	(Russia) Daria Kruzhkova (Turkey) Melis Sezer	(Slovenia) Nastja Kolar (Russia) Ekaterina Kazionova (France) Caroline Roméo (France) Manon Peral
June 26	Istanbul, Turkey; Clay $15,000; Singles and doubles draws	(United States) Sanaz Marand (Turkey) Melis Sezer; 6–2, 7–6^{(7–1)}	(Croatia) Ena Kajević (Turkey) İpek Öz	(Russia) Daria Kruzhkova (Turkey) Melis Sezer	(Slovenia) Nastja Kolar (Russia) Ekaterina Kazionova (France) Caroline Roméo (France) Manon Peral
