= Kültürpark Cup =

- 2017 TEB Kültürpark Cup

ITF Women's Tour
- Event name: İzmir
- Location: İzmir, Turkey
- Venue: Kültürpark Tenis Kulübü
- Category: ITF $60,000
- Surface: Hard
- Prize money: $60,000
- Website: www.kptk.org

The Kültürpark Cup was a tennis tournament held on outdoor hardcourts at Kültürpark Tenis Kulübü in İzmir, Turkey. It was held in 2017 and was part of the ITF Women's Circuit as a $60,000 event.

== Past finals ==
=== Singles ===
Year	Champion	Runner-up	Score
2017	(Romania) Mihaela Buzărnescu	(Japan) Eri Hozumi	6–1, 6–0

=== Doubles ===
Year	Champions	Runners-up	Score
2017	(Belgium) An-Sophie Mestach (Serbia) Nina Stojanović	(Finland) Emma Laine (Japan) Kotomi Takahata	6–4, 7–5
