= 2017 TEB Kültürpark Cup =

- Date: 19–25 June
- Edition: 1st
- Category: ITF Women's Circuit
- Prize money: $60,000
- Surface: Hard
- Location: İzmir, Turkey

Champions

Singles
- (Romania) Mihaela Buzărnescu

Doubles
- (Belgium) An-Sophie Mestach / (Serbia) Nina Stojanović
TEB Kültürpark Cup	· 2018 →

The 2017 TEB Kültürpark Cup was a professional tennis tournament played on outdoor hard courts. It was the first edition of the tournament and was part of the 2017 ITF Women's Circuit. It took place in İzmir, Turkey, on 19–25 June 2017.

== Singles main draw entrants ==
=== Seeds ===
Country	Player	Rank^{1}	Seed
BUL	Viktoriya Tomova	142	1
SRB	Nina Stojanović	144	2
UKR	Kateryna Kozlova	155	3
SVK	Viktória Kužmová	158	4
TUR	Çağla Büyükakçay	173	5
TUR	Başak Eraydın	198	6
GEO	Sofia Shapatava	219	7
JPN	Eri Hozumi	235	8

- ^{1} Rankings as of 12 June 2017.

=== Other entrants ===
The following player received a wildcard into the singles main draw:

- (Turkey) Berfu Cengiz
- (Turkey) Azradeniz Çömlek
- (Turkey) Betina Tokaç
- (Turkey) İlay Yörük

The following player received entry into the singles main draw using a protected ranking:

- (Romania) Mihaela Buzărnescu

The following players received entry from the qualifying draw:

- (Turkey) Cemre Anıl
- (Turkey) İpek Öz
- (Germany) Christina Shakovets
- (Venezuela) Aymet Uzcátegui

== Champions ==
=== Singles ===
- (Romania) Mihaela Buzărnescu def. (Japan) Eri Hozumi, 6–1, 6–0

=== Doubles ===
- (Belgium) An-Sophie Mestach / (Serbia) Nina Stojanović def. (Finland) Emma Laine / (Japan) Kotomi Takahata, 6–4, 7–5
