= 2017 Nana Trophy – Singles =

Singles
- 2017 Nana Trophy

Final
- Champion: (Netherlands) Richèl Hogenkamp
- Runner-up: (North Macedonia) Lina Gjorcheska
- Score: 7–5, 6–4

Events
| Singles | Doubles |
| ← 2016 · | Nana Trophy | · 2018 → |

Ons Jabeur was the defending champion, but chose not to participate.

Richèl Hogenkamp won the title, defeating Lina Gjorcheska in the final, 7–5, 6–4.

== Seeds ==
1. (Russia) Anna Blinkova (first round)
2. (Belgium) Alison Van Uytvanck (withdrew)
3. (Netherlands) Richèl Hogenkamp (champion)
4. (Spain) Sílvia Soler Espinosa (quarterfinals)
5. (Netherlands) Cindy Burger (first round)
6. (Netherlands) Arantxa Rus (first round)
7. (North Macedonia) Lina Gjorcheska (final)
8. (France) Amandine Hesse (first round)

== Draw ==
=== Key ===
- Q = Qualifier
- WC = Wild card
- LL = Lucky loser
- Alt = Alternate
- SE = Special exempt
- PR = Protected ranking
- ITF = ITF entry
- JE = Junior exempt
- w/o = Walkover
- r = Retired
- d = Defaulted
- SR = Special ranking

=== Finals ===
Semifinals
PR | (Croatia) Petra Martić | 6 | 4 | 4
7 | (North Macedonia) Lina Gjorcheska | 3 | 6 | 6
3 | (Netherlands) Richèl Hogenkamp | 7^{7} | 6
LL | (Hungary) Ágnes Bukta | 6^{4} | 1

Final
7 | (North Macedonia) Lina Gjorcheska | 5 | 4
3 | (Netherlands) Richèl Hogenkamp | 7 | 6

=== Top half ===
First round
1 | (Russia) A Blinkova | 6^{7} | 4
Q | (Poland) K Kawa | 7^{9} | 6
WC | (South Africa) Z Kruger | 3 | 2
WC | (Egypt) S Samir | 6 | 6
(France) M Georges | 4 | 1
PR | (Croatia) P Martić | 6 | 6
Q | (Ukraine) G Poznikhirenko | 6 | 6
8 | (France) A Hesse | 1 | 3
4 | (Spain) S Soler Espinosa | 5
(Czech Republic) M Bouzková | 4^{r}
(Czech Republic) K Muchová | 3 | 6 | 4
(Spain) G García Pérez | 6 | 1 | 6
PR | (China) S Xu | 0 | 2
WC | (France) J Vulpio | 6 | 6
(Chile) D Seguel | 6 | 6^{2} | 3
7 | (North Macedonia) L Gjorcheska | 3 | 7^{7} | 6

Second round
Q | (Poland) K Kawa | 6 | 7^{12}
WC | (Egypt) S Samir | 2 | 6^{10}
PR | (Croatia) P Martić | 6 | 6
Q | (Ukraine) G Poznikhirenko | 3 | 4
4 | (Spain) S Soler Espinosa | 6 | 6
(Spain) G García Pérez | 4 | 4
WC | (France) J Vulpio | 3 | 0
7 | (North Macedonia) L Gjorcheska | 6 | 6

Quarterfinals
Q | (Poland) K Kawa | 0 | 3
PR | (Croatia) P Martić | 6 | 6
4 | (Spain) S Soler Espinosa | 6 | 1 | 2
7 | (North Macedonia) L Gjorcheska | 4 | 6 | 6

Semifinals
PR | (Croatia) P Martić | 6 | 4 | 4
7 | (North Macedonia) L Gjorcheska | 3 | 6 | 6

=== Bottom half ===
First round
6 | (Netherlands) A Rus | 3 | 2
LL | (France) M Arcangioli | 6 | 6
WC | (Tunisia) C Bechri | 7^{7} | 2 | 5
Q | (Russia) M Paigina | 6^{5} | 6 | 7
(France) A Lim | 0 | 3
(Spain) MT Torró Flor | 6 | 6
(Czech Republic) G Pantůčková | 5 | 7 | 4
3 | (Netherlands) R Hogenkamp | 7 | 5 | 6
5 | (Netherlands) C Burger | 3 | 3
(Liechtenstein) K von Deichmann | 6 | 6
(Belgium) A-S Mestach | 2 | 2
PR | (Romania) A Dulgheru | 6 | 6
(France) C Paquet | 4 | 7 | 0^{r}
Q | (Slovakia) V Juhászová | 6 | 5 | 3
(Russia) A Panova | 3 | 3
LL | (Hungary) Á Bukta | 6 | 6

Second round
LL | (France) M Arcangioli | 6 | 1 | 6
Q | (Russia) M Paigina | 0 | 6 | 2
(Spain) MT Torró Flor | 6^{4} | 3
3 | (Netherlands) R Hogenkamp | 7^{7} | 6
(Liechtenstein) K von Deichmann | 6 | 6
PR | (Romania) A Dulgheru | 4 | 0
Q | (Slovakia) V Juhászová | 4 | 3
LL | (Hungary) Á Bukta | 6 | 6

Quarterfinals
LL | (France) M Arcangioli | 4 | 1
3 | (Netherlands) R Hogenkamp | 6 | 6
(Liechtenstein) K von Deichmann | 6 | 3 | 0
LL | (Hungary) Á Bukta | 4 | 6 | 6

Semifinals
3 | (Netherlands) R Hogenkamp | 7^{7} | 6
LL | (Hungary) Á Bukta | 6^{4} | 1
