= 2017 TEB Kültürpark Cup – Doubles =

Doubles
- 2017 TEB Kültürpark Cup

Final
- Champion: (Belgium) An-Sophie Mestach (Serbia) Nina Stojanović
- Runner-up: (Finland) Emma Laine (Japan) Kotomi Takahata
- Score: 6–4, 7–5

Events
Singles	Doubles
TEB Kültürpark Cup	· 2018 →

It was the first edition of the tournament.

An-Sophie Mestach and Nina Stojanović won the title, defeating Emma Laine and Kotomi Takahata in the final, 6–4, 7–5.

== Seeds ==
1. (Belgium) An-Sophie Mestach / (Serbia) Nina Stojanović (champions)
2. (Romania) Mihaela Buzărnescu / (Romania) Elena Gabriela Ruse (semifinals)
3. (Finland) Emma Laine / (Japan) Kotomi Takahata (final)
4. (Turkey) Ayla Aksu / (Turkey) Pemra Özgen (second round)

== Draw ==
=== Key ===
- Q = Qualifier
- WC = Wild card
- LL = Lucky loser
- Alt = Alternate
- SE = Special exempt
- PR = Protected ranking
- ITF = ITF entry
- JE = Junior exempt
- w/o = Walkover
- r = Retired
- d = Defaulted
- SR = Special ranking

First round
(Romania) DM Mihail (Russia) V Yushchenko	2	1
(Slovenia) N Kolar (Germany) C Shakovets	6	6
4	(Turkey) A Aksu (Turkey) P Özgen	6^{2}	6	[10]
(Turkey) B Cengiz (Turkey) İ Öz	7^{7}	3	[8]
(Romania) RG Șerban (Turkey) M Sezer	4	6	[10]
(Georgia (country)) M Bolkvadze (Georgia (country)) S Shapatava	6	4	[7]
(Turkey) M Demirci (Moldova) V Medvedcova	4	7^{9}	[7]
(Romania) C Adamescu (Germany) L-M Mätschke	6	6^{7}	[10]
(Russia) V Aponasenko (Croatia) T Faber	2	1
3	(Finland) E Laine (Japan) K Takahata	6	6
(Turkey) Z Ay (Venezuela) A Uzcátegui	4	2
(Ukraine) K Malikova (Ukraine) V Stotyka	6	6
(Turkey) A Çömlek (Turkey) İ Yörük	2	0
2	(Romania) M Buzărnescu (Romania) EG Ruse	6	6

Quarterfinals
1	(Belgium) A-S Mestach (Serbia) N Stojanović	1
(Slovenia) N Kolar (Germany) C Shakovets	0^{r}
4	(Turkey) A Aksu (Turkey) P Özgen	3	6	[8]
(Romania) RG Șerban (Turkey) M Sezer	6	4	[10]
(Romania) C Adamescu (Germany) L-M Mätschke	2	6	[1]
3	(Finland) E Laine (Japan) K Takahata	6	3	[10]
(Ukraine) K Malikova (Ukraine) V Stotyka	0	1
2	(Romania) M Buzărnescu (Romania) EG Ruse	6	6

Semifinals
1	(Belgium) A-S Mestach (Serbia) N Stojanović	6	6
(Romania) RG Șerban (Turkey) M Sezer	1	2
3	(Finland) E Laine (Japan) K Takahata	6	6
2	(Romania) M Buzărnescu (Romania) EG Ruse	3	0

Final
1	(Belgium) A-S Mestach (Serbia) N Stojanović	6	7
3	(Finland) E Laine (Japan) K Takahata	4	5
