= 2017 Nana Trophy – Doubles =

Doubles
- 2017 Nana Trophy

Final
- Champion: (Argentina) Guadalupe Pérez Rojas (Chile) Daniela Seguel
- Runner-up: (Hungary) Ágnes Bukta (Slovakia) Vivien Juhászová
- Score: 6–7^{(3–7)}, 6–3, [11–9]

Events
Singles	Doubles
- Nana Trophy

Arina Rodionova and Valeriya Strakhova were the defending champions, but both players chose not to participate.

Guadalupe Pérez Rojas and Daniela Seguel won the title, defeating Ágnes Bukta and Vivien Juhászová in the final, 6–7^{(3–7)}, 6–3, [11–9].

== Seeds ==
1. (Brazil) Gabriela Cé / (Spain) Georgina García Pérez (quarterfinals, withdrew)
2. (Argentina) Guadalupe Pérez Rojas / (Chile) Daniela Seguel (champions)
3. (Russia) Anna Blinkova / (Belgium) An-Sophie Mestach (semifinals)
4. (Hungary) Ágnes Bukta / (Slovakia) Vivien Juhászová (final)

== Draw ==
Key

- Q = Qualifier
- WC = Wild card
- LL = Lucky loser
- Alt = Alternate
- ITF = ITF entry
- PR = Protected ranking
- SR = Special ranking
- SE = Special exempt
- JE = Junior exempt
- JR = Junior Accelerator Programme entrant
- CO = College Accelerator Programme entrant
- NG = Next Gen Accelerator Program entrant
- w/o = Walkover
- r = Retired
- d = Defaulted

First round
1	(Brazil) G Cé (Spain) G García Pérez	6	3	[10]
(Australia) P Hon (France) A Lim	2	6	[6]
WC	(Canada) P Januskova (Ukraine) K Riabtseva	6	4	[10]
(United Kingdom) S Anane (United Kingdom) N Hillyer	3	6	[4]
4	(Hungary) Á Bukta (Slovakia) V Juhászová	6	4	[10]
(North Macedonia) L Gjorcheska (Ukraine) G Poznikhirenko	2	6	[7]
(Russia) A Panova (Spain) MT Torró Flor	6	6
WC	(Italy) C Coppola (Romania) A Dulgheru	2	4
(Russia) V Aponasenko (Trinidad and Tobago) Y Leacock	7	6
(Belgium) C Chantraine (Canada) M Patrascu	5	2
WC	(Tunisia) C Bechri (China) S Xu	1	2
3	(Russia) A Blinkova (Belgium) A-S Mestach	6	6
(Poland) K Kawa (Bosnia and Herzegovina) J Tinjić	6	6
(Netherlands) R van der Hoek (Poland) S Zaniewska	4	0
(France) M Georges (France) C Paquet
2	(Argentina) G Pérez Rojas (Chile) D Seguel	w/o

Quarterfinals
1	(Brazil) G Cé (Spain) G García Pérez
WC	(Canada) P Januskova (Ukraine) K Riabtseva	w/o
4	(Hungary) Á Bukta (Slovakia) V Juhászová	6	4	[10]
(Russia) A Panova (Spain) MT Torró Flor	3	6	[8]
(Russia) V Aponasenko (Trinidad and Tobago) Y Leacock	2	2
3	(Russia) A Blinkova (Belgium) A-S Mestach	6	6
(Poland) K Kawa (Bosnia and Herzegovina) J Tinjić	0	4
2	(Argentina) G Pérez Rojas (Chile) D Seguel	6	6

Semifinals
WC	(Canada) P Januskova (Ukraine) K Riabtseva	1	0
4	(Hungary) Á Bukta (Slovakia) V Juhászová	6	6
3	(Russia) A Blinkova (Belgium) A-S Mestach	4	6	[6]
2	(Argentina) G Pérez Rojas (Chile) D Seguel	6	1	[10]

Final
4	(Hungary) Á Bukta (Slovakia) V Juhászová	7^{7}	3	[9]
2	(Argentina) G Pérez Rojas (Chile) D Seguel	6^{3}	6	[11]
