= 2017 Nana Trophy =

Tennis tournament

- Date: 24–30 April
- Edition: 6th
- Category: ITF Women's Circuit
- Prize money: $60,000
- Surface: Clay
- Location: Tunis, Tunisia

Champions

Singles
- (Netherlands) Richèl Hogenkamp

Doubles
- (Argentina) Guadalupe Pérez Rojas / (Chile) Daniela Seguel
← 2016 ·	Nana Trophy	· 2018 →

The 2017 Nana Trophy was a professional tennis tournament played on outdoor clay courts. It was the sixth edition of the tournament and part of the 2017 ITF Women's Circuit, offering a total of $60,000 in prize money. It took place in Tunis, Tunisia, from 24–30 April 2017.

== Singles main draw entrants ==
=== Seeds ===
Country	Player	Rank^{1}	Seed
RUS	Anna Blinkova	131	1
~~BEL~~	~~Alison Van Uytvanck~~	~~132~~	~~2~~
NED	Richèl Hogenkamp	136	3
ESP	Sílvia Soler Espinosa	156	4
NED	Cindy Burger	157	5
NED	Arantxa Rus	184	6
MKD	Lina Gjorcheska	200	7
FRA	Amandine Hesse	204	8

- ^{1} Rankings as of 17 April 2017

=== Other entrants ===
The following players received wildcards into the singles main draw:

- (Tunisia) Chiraz Bechri
- (South Africa) Zoë Kruger
- (Egypt) Sandra Samir
- (France) Julia Vulpio

The following players received entry into the singles main draw by a protected ranking:

- (Romania) Alexandra Dulgheru
- (Croatia) Petra Martić
- (China) Xu Shilin

The following players received entry from the qualifying draw:

- (Slovakia) Vivien Juhászová
- (Poland) Katarzyna Kawa
- (Russia) Marta Paigina
- (Ukraine) Ganna Poznikhirenko

The following player received entry into the singles main draw by a lucky loser:

- (France) Manon Arcangioli
- (Hungary) Ágnes Bukta

== Champions ==
=== Singles ===
- (Netherlands) Richèl Hogenkamp def. (North Macedonia) Lina Gjorcheska, 7–5, 6–4

=== Doubles ===
- (Argentina) Guadalupe Pérez Rojas / (Chile) Daniela Seguel def. (Hungary) Ágnes Bukta / (Slovakia) Vivien Juhászová, 6–7^{(3–7)}, 6–3, [11–9]
