= 2017 TEB Kültürpark Cup – Singles =

Singles
- 2017 TEB Kültürpark Cup

Final
- Champion: (Romania) Mihaela Buzărnescu
- Runner-up: (Japan) Eri Hozumi
- Score: 6–1, 6–0

Events
Singles	Doubles
TEB Kültürpark Cup	· 2018 →

This was the first edition of the tournament.

Mihaela Buzărnescu won the title, defeating Eri Hozumi in the final, 6–1, 6–0.

== Seeds ==
1. (Bulgaria) Viktoriya Tomova (semifinals)
2. (Serbia) Nina Stojanović (quarterfinals)
3. (Ukraine) Kateryna Kozlova (first round)
4. (Slovakia) Viktória Kužmová (second round)
5. (Turkey) Çağla Büyükakçay (first round)
6. (Turkey) Başak Eraydın (second round)
7. (Georgia (country)) Sofia Shapatava (quarterfinals)
8. (Japan) Eri Hozumi (final)

== Draw ==
=== Key ===
- Q = Qualifier
- WC = Wild card
- LL = Lucky loser
- Alt = Alternate
- SE = Special exempt
- PR = Protected ranking
- ITF = ITF entry
- JE = Junior exempt
- w/o = Walkover
- r = Retired
- d = Defaulted
- SR = Special ranking

=== Finals ===
Semifinals
1	(Bulgaria) Viktoriya Tomova	5	2
PR	(Romania) Mihaela Buzărnescu	7	6
(Turkey) Ayla Aksu	2	5
8	(Japan) Eri Hozumi	6	7

Final
PR	(Romania) Mihaela Buzărnescu	6	6
8	(Japan) Eri Hozumi	1	0

=== Top half ===
First round
1	(Bulgaria) V Tomova	6	6
WC	(Turkey) İ Yörük	0	0
(Uzbekistan) A Amanmuradova	5	6	6
(United States) S Marand	7	3	2
(Slovenia) N Kolar	6	6
Q	(Turkey) İ Öz	3	1
(Spain) P Badosa Gibert	7^{7}	6^{1}	7^{7}
5	(Turkey) Ç Büyükakçay	6^{4}	7^{7}	6^{5}
4	(Slovakia) V Kužmová	6	6
WC	(Turkey) B Tokaç	2	1
(Belgium) A-S Mestach	7^{7}	4	7
(Poland) M Fręch	6^{3}	6	5
(Romania) EG Ruse	4	1
PR	(Romania) M Buzărnescu	6	6
(Turkey) M Sezer	4	1
6	(Turkey) B Eraydın	6	6

Second round
1	(Bulgaria) V Tomova	6	6
(Uzbekistan) A Amanmuradova	4	2
(Slovenia) N Kolar	6	4	6
(Spain) P Badosa Gibert	0	6	4
4	(Slovakia) V Kužmová	3	2
(Belgium) A-S Mestach	6	6
PR	(Romania) M Buzărnescu	7^{7}	6
6	(Turkey) B Eraydın	6^{3}	2

Quarterfinals
1	(Bulgaria) V Tomova	6	6
(Slovenia) N Kolar	4	3
(Belgium) A-S Mestach	3	1
PR	(Romania) M Buzărnescu	6	6

Semifinals
1	(Bulgaria) V Tomova	5	2
PR	(Romania) M Buzărnescu	7	6

=== Bottom half ===
First round
7	(Georgia (country)) S Shapatava	4	7^{10}	7^{7}
(Georgia (country)) M Bolkvadze	6	6^{8}	6^{2}
(Georgia (country)) E Gorgodze	3	4
(Turkey) P Özgen	6	6
Q	(Turkey) C Anıl	6	6
Q	(Germany) C Shakovets	3	2
(Turkey) A Aksu	6	7^{7}
3	(Ukraine) K Kozlova	4	6^{4}
8	(Japan) E Hozumi	6	6
Q	(Venezuela) A Uzcátegui	2	2
(Serbia) J Jakšić	7	4	5
WC	(Turkey) B Cengiz	5	6	7
(Romania) RG Șerban	6	6
WC	(Turkey) A Çömlek	0	1
(Russia) V Flink	4	3
2	(Serbia) N Stojanović	6	6

Second round
7	(Georgia (country)) S Shapatava	6	7
(Turkey) P Özgen	2	5
Q	(Turkey) C Anıl	1	0
(Turkey) A Aksu	6	6
8	(Japan) E Hozumi	3	7^{7}	7^{7}
WC	(Turkey) B Cengiz	6	6^{1}	6^{5}
(Romania) RG Șerban	6	5	3
2	(Serbia) N Stojanović	4	7	6

Quarterfinals
7	(Georgia (country)) S Shapatava	6^{3}	1
(Turkey) A Aksu	7^{7}	6
8	(Japan) E Hozumi	6	6
2	(Serbia) N Stojanović	4	3

Semifinals
(Turkey) A Aksu	2	5
8	(Japan) E Hozumi	6	7
