= Dayana Yastremska career statistics =

Career finals
Discipline	Type	Won	Lost	Total
Singles	Grand Slam	–	–	–
Singles	WTA Finals	–	–	–
Singles	WTA Elite	–	–	–
Singles	WTA 1000 (Note: Formerly known as: Category 4 & 5 & 6 (until 1990); Tier I (until 2009); WTA Premier Mandatory and 5 (until 2021))	–	–	–
Singles	WTA 500 (Note: Formerly known as: Category 3 (until 1990); Tier II (until 2009); WTA Premier (until 2021))	0	2	2
Singles	WTA 250 (Note: Formerly known as: Category 1 & 2 (until 1990); Tier III & IV & V (until 2009); WTA International (until 2021))	3	2	5
Singles	Olympics	–	–	–
Singles	Total	3	4	7
Doubles	Grand Slam	–	–	–
Doubles	WTA Finals	–	–	–
Doubles	WTA Elite	–	–	–
Doubles	WTA 1000	0	1	1
Doubles	WTA 500	–	–	–
Doubles	WTA 250	–	–	–
Doubles	Olympics	–	–	–
Doubles	Total	0	1	1

This is a list of career statistics of Ukrainian tennis player Dayana Yastremska since her professional debut in 2015. Yastremska has won three singles titles on WTA Tour.

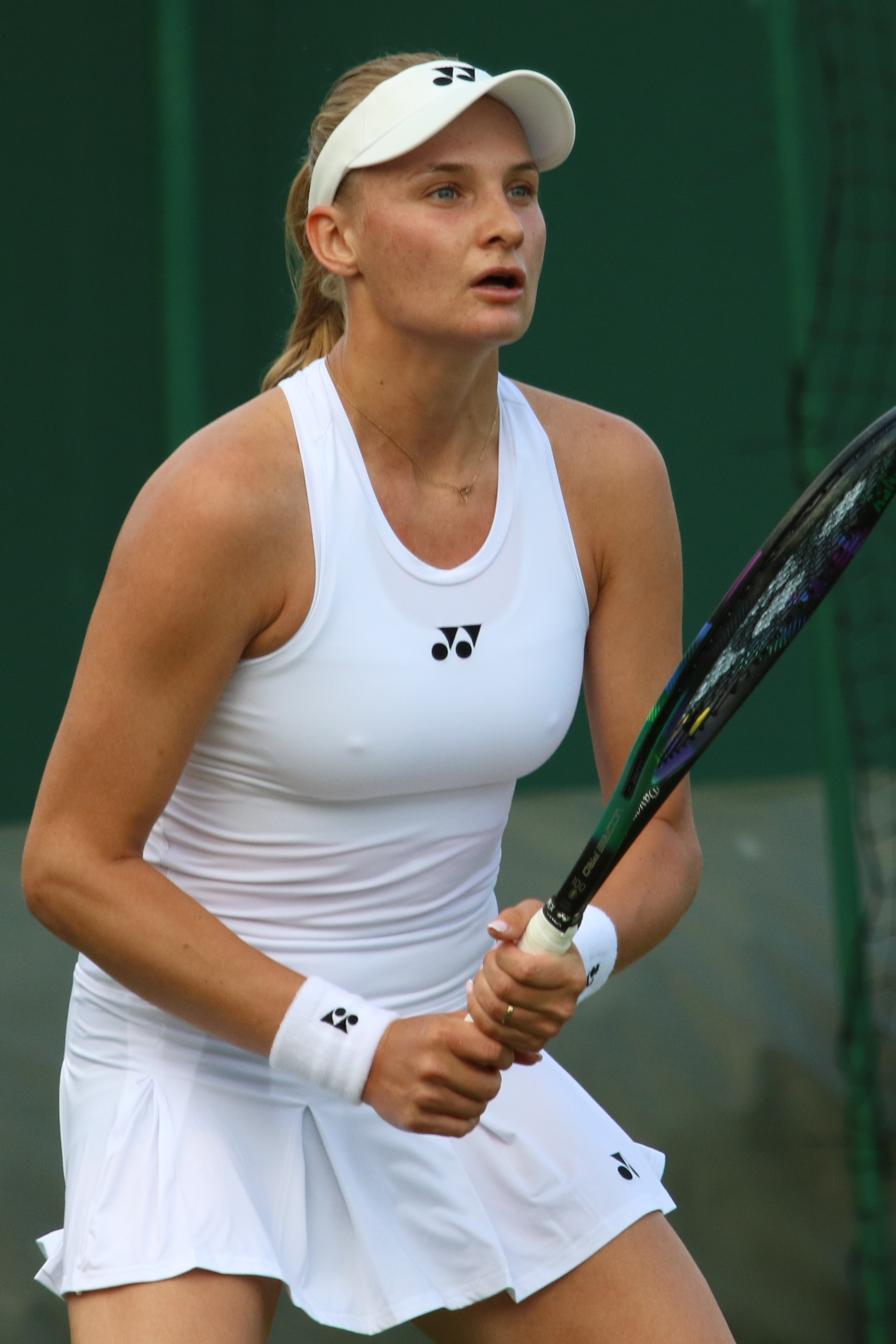
Ukrainian player Dayana Yastremska at the 2023 Wimbledon Championships

== Performance timelines ==
Key
W	F	SF	QF	#R	RR	Q#	DNQ	A	NH

(W) winner; (F) finalist; (SF) semifinalist; (QF) quarterfinalist; (#R) rounds 4, 3, 2, 1; (RR) round-robin stage; (Q#) qualification round; (DNQ) did not qualify; (A) absent; (NH) not held; (SR) strike rate (events won / competed); (W–L) win–loss record.
To avoid confusion and double counting, these charts are updated at the conclusion of a tournament or when the player's participation has ended.

Only main-draw results in WTA Tour, Grand Slam tournaments, Billie Jean King Cup, United Cup, Hopman Cup and Olympic Games are included in Win–Loss records.

=== Singles ===
Current through the 2026 French Open.

Tournament	2016	2017	2018	2019	2020	2021	2022	2023	2024	2025	2026	SR	W–L	Win %
Grand Slam tournaments
Australian Open	A	A	Q2	3R	2R	A	1R	1R	SF	3R	1R	0 / 7	10–7	59%
French Open	A	A	A	1R	1R	A	1R	1R	3R	3R	1R	0 / 7	4–7	36%
Wimbledon	A	A	Q2	4R	NH	A	1R	Q3	3R	3R		0 / 4	7–4	64%
US Open	A	A	1R	3R	2R	1R	1R	Q3	1R	1R		0 / 7	3–7	30%
Win–Loss	0–0	0–0	0–1	7–4	2–3	0–1	0–4	0–2	9–4	6–4	0–2	0 / 25	24–25	49%
Year-end championships
WTA Elite Trophy	DNQ			RR	Not Held			DNQ	Not Held			0 / 1	1–1	50%
National representation
Summer Olympics	A	Not Held				1R	Not Held		2R	Not Held		1 / 2	1–2	33%
Billie Jean King Cup	A	A	A	Z1	PO		QR					0 / 0	6–1	86%
WTA 1000 tournaments
Qatar Open	A	NTI	A	NTI	3R	NTI	A	NTI	A	1R	2R	0 / 3	3–3	50%
Dubai Championships	NTI	A	NTI	1R	NTI	A	NTI	2R	1R	3R	1R	0 / 5	3–5	38%
Indian Wells Open	A	A	A	1R	NH	2R	1R	2R	2R	3R	2R	0 / 7	5–7	42%
Miami Open	A	A	A	2R	NH	A	Q1	Q2	3R	1R	2R	0 / 4	3–4	43%
Madrid Open	A	A	A	1R	NH	A	2R	1R	3R	2R	1R	0 / 6	3–6	33%
Italian Open	A	A	A	1R	3R	A	A	1R	3R	1R	1R	0 / 6	3–6	33%
Canadian Open	A	A	A	3R	NH	1R	A	A	1R	4R		0 / 4	4–4	50%
Cincinnati Open	A	A	A	2R	3R	2R	Q1	A	1R	2R (Note: Withdrawal during the tournament not counted as a loss.)		0 / 4	4–4	50%
China Open	A	A	1R	2R	Not Held			A	2R	2R		0 / 4	1–4	20%
Wuhan Open	A	A	A	QF	Not Held				1R	1R		0 / 3	3–3	50%
Guadalajara Open	Not Held						A	2R	Not Tier I			0 / 1	1–1	50%
Win–Loss	0–0	0–0	0–1	8–9	6–3	2–3	1–2	3–5	3–9	8–9	3–6	0 / 47	34–47	42%
Career statistics
	2016	2017	2018	2019	2020	2021	2022	2023	2024	2025	2026	SR	W–L	Win %
Tournaments	2	2	8	23	12	12	18	16	20	23	13	Career total: 147		
Titles	0	0	1	2	0	0	0	0	0	0	0	Career total: 3		
Finals	0	0	1	2	1	0	1	0	0	2	0	Career total: 7		
Hard Win–Loss	0–1	0–0	9–6	24–14	13–9	5–11	10–11	4–10	9–13	16–15	6–9	2 / 101	96–99	49%
Clay Win–Loss	0–1	2–1	0–1	5–4	4–3	2–1	3–3	1–6	5–5	6–5	2–4	1 / 35	30–34	47%
Grass Win–Loss	0–0	0–1	0–0	3–3	NH	0–0	2–4	0–0	3–2	8–3		0 / 13	16–13	55%
Overall Win–Loss	0–2	2–2	9–7	32–21	17–12	7–12	15–18	5–16	17–20	30–23	8–13	3 / 149	142–146	49%
Win %	0%	50%	56%	60%	59%	37%	45%	24%	46%	57%	38%	Career total: 49%		
Year-end ranking (Note: 2015: WTA ranking - 1103)	342	189	60	22	29	97	102	106	33	27		$6,372,577		

=== Doubles ===
Current through the 2023 Wimbledon Championships.

Tournament	2016	2017	2018	2019	2020	2021	2022	2023	2024	SR	W–L	Win %
Grand Slam tournaments
Australian Open	A	A	A	1R	1R	A	3R	A	A	0 / 3	2–3	40%
French Open	A	A	A	A	1R	A	A	A	1R	0 / 2	0–2	0%
Wimbledon	A	A	A	1R	NH	A	1R	A	1R	0 / 3	0–3	0%
US Open	A	A	A	1R	A	3R	A	A		0 / 2	2–2	50%
Win–Loss	0–0	0–0	0–0	0–3	0–2	2–1	2–2	0–0		0 / 8	4–8	33%
National representation
Summer Olympics	A	Not Held				1R	Not Held		2R	0 / 2	1–1	50%
Billie Jean King Cup (Note: Formerly known as Fed Cup until 2020.)	A	A	A	Z1	PO		QR			0 / 0	1–1	50%
WTA 1000 tournaments
Qatar Open	A	NTI	A	NTI	1R	NTI	A	NTI	A	0 / 1	0–1	0%
Dubai Championships	NTI	A	NTI	A	NTI	A	NTI	A	A	0 / 0	0–0	–
Indian Wells Open	A	A	A	A	NH	1R	1R	A	A	0 / 2	0–2	0%
Miami Open	A	A	A	A	NH	A	A	A	QF	0 / 1	2–1	67%
Madrid Open	A	A	A	A	NH	A	A	A	1R	0 / 1	0–1	0%
Italian Open	A	A	A	A	1R	A	A	A	2R	0 / 2	1–2	33%
Canadian Open	A	A	A	A	NH	2R	A	A	A	0 / 1	1–1	50%
Cincinnati Open	A	A	A	A	A	A	A	A		0 / 0	0–0	–
Wuhan Open	A	A	A	A	Not Held			A		0 / 0	0–0	–
China Open	A	A	A	F	Not Held			A		0 / 1	4–1	80%
Guadalajara Open	Not Held						A	1R	NTI	0 / 1	0–1	–
Win–Loss	0–0	0–0	0–0	4–1	0–2	1–2	0–1	0–0		0 / 6	5–6	45%
Career statistics
	2016	2017	2018	2019	2020	2021	2022	2023	2024	SR	W–L	Win %
Tournaments	1	1	1	10	6	5	4	1		Career total: 29		
Titles	0	0	0	0	0	0	0	0		Career total: 0		
Finals	0	0	0	1	0	0	0	0		Career total: 1		
Hard Win–Loss	1–1	0–0	1–1	6–6	1–3	4–5	2–4	0–1		0 / 20	15–21	42%
Clay Win–Loss	0–0	1–1	0–0	2–1	0–3	0–0	0–0	0–0		0 / 5	3–5	38%
Grass Win–Loss	0–0	0–0	0–0	2–3	NH	0–0	0–1	0–0		0 / 4	2–4	33%
Overall Win–Loss	1–1	1–1	1–1	10–10	1–6	4–5	2–5	0–1		0 / 29	20–30	40%
Win %	50%	50%	50%	50%	14%	44%	29%	0%		Career total: 40%		
Year-end ranking	603	229	346	84	90	196	293	728				

== Significant finals ==
=== WTA 1000 tournaments ===
==== Doubles: 1 (runner-up) ====
Result	Year	Tournament	Surface	Partner	Opponents	Score
Loss	2019	China Open	Hard	(Latvia) Jeļena Ostapenko	(United States) Sofia Kenin (United States) Bethanie Mattek-Sands	3–6, 7–6^{(7–5)}, [7–10]

== WTA Tour finals ==
=== Singles: 7 (3 titles, 4 runner-ups) ===
Legend Premier / WTA 500 (0–2) International / WTA 250 (3–2)	Finals by surface Hard (2–3) Clay (1–0) Grass (0–1)	Finals by setting Outdoor (3–2) Indoor (0–2)

Result	W–L	Date	Tournament	Tier	Surface	Opponent	Score
Win	1–0	Oct 2018	Hong Kong Open, China SAR	International	Hard	(China) Wang Qiang	6–2, 6–1
Win	2–0	Feb 2019	Hua Hin Championships, Thailand	International	Hard	(Australia) Ajla Tomljanović	6–2, 2–6, 7–6^{(7–3)}
Win	3–0	May 2019	Internationaux de Strasbourg, France	International	Clay	(France) Caroline Garcia	6–4, 5–7, 7–6^{(7–3)}
Loss	3–1	Jan 2020	Adelaide International, Australia	Premier	Hard	(Australia) Ashleigh Barty	2–6, 5–7
Loss	3–2	Mar 2022	Lyon Open, France	WTA 250	Hard (i)	(China) Zhang Shuai	6–3, 3–6, 4–6
Loss	3–3	Feb 2025	Linz Open, Austria	WTA 500	Hard (i)	Ekaterina Alexandrova	2–6, 6–3, 5–7
Loss	3–4	Jun 2025	Nottingham Open, United Kingdom	WTA 250	Grass	(United States) McCartney Kessler	4–6, 5–7

=== Doubles: 1 (runner-up) ===
Legend Premier M (0–1)	Finals by surface Hard (0–1)

Result	Date	Tournament	Tier	Surface	Partner	Opponents	Score
Loss	Sep 2019	China Open	Premier M	Hard	(Latvia) Jeļena Ostapenko	(United States) Sofia Kenin (United States) Bethanie Mattek-Sands	3–6, 7–6^{(7–5)}, [7–10]

== WTA 125 finals ==
=== Singles: 2 (2 titles) ===
Result	W–L	Date	Tournament	Surface	Opponent	Score
Win	1–0	Aug 2023	Kozerki Open, Poland	Hard	(Belgium) Greet Minnen	2–6, 6–1, 6–3
Win	2–0	May 2026	Parma Open, Italy	Clay	(Czech Republic) Barbora Krejčíková	6–3, 6–3

== ITF Circuit finals ==
=== Singles: 6 (3 titles, 3 runner-ups) ===
Legend $100,000 tournaments (0–3) $60,000 tournaments (2–0) $25,000 tournaments (1–0)	Finals by surface Hard (0–1) Clay (3–1) Grass (0–1)

Result	W–L	Date	Tournament	Tier	Surface	Opponent	Score
Win	1–0	Mar 2016	ITF Campinas, Brazil	25,000	Clay	(France) Alizé Lim	6–4, 6–4
Win	2–0	Sep 2017	Ladies Open Dunakeszi, Hungary	60,000	Clay	(Ukraine) Katarina Zavatska	6–0, 6–1
Loss	2–1	Sep 2017	Neva Cup St. Petersburg, Russia	100,000	Hard (i)	(Switzerland) Belinda Bencic	2–6, 3–6
Loss	2–2	May 2018	Open de Cagnes-sur-Mer, France	100,000	Clay	(Sweden) Rebecca Peterson	4–6, 5–7
Loss	2–3	Jun 2018	Ilkley Trophy, United Kingdom	100,000	Grass	(Czech Republic) Tereza Smitková	6–7^{(2–7)}, 6–3, 6–7^{(4–7)}
Win	3–3	Jul 2018	Internazionale di Roma, Italy	60,000+H	Clay	(Russia) Anastasia Potapova	6–1, 6–0

=== Doubles: 3 (3 titles) ===
Legend $80,000 tournaments (1–0) $25,000 tournaments (2–0)	Finals by surface Hard (1–0) Clay (2–0)

Result	W–L	Date	Tournament	Tier	Surface	Partner	Opponents	Score
Win	1–0	Feb 2017	ITF Moscow, Russia	25,000	Hard (i)	(Belarus) Vera Lapko	(Netherlands) Bibiane Schoofs (Russia) Ekaterina Yashina	7–5, 6–3
Win	2–0	Mar 2017	ITF Pula, Italy	25,000	Clay	(Russia) Olesya Pervushina	(United Kingdom) Tara Moore (Switzerland) Conny Perrin	6–4, 6–4
Win	3–0	Jul 2017	Prague Open, Czech Republic	80,000	Clay	(Russia) Anastasia Potapova	(Romania) Mihaela Buzărnescu (Ukraine) Alena Fomina	6–2, 6–2

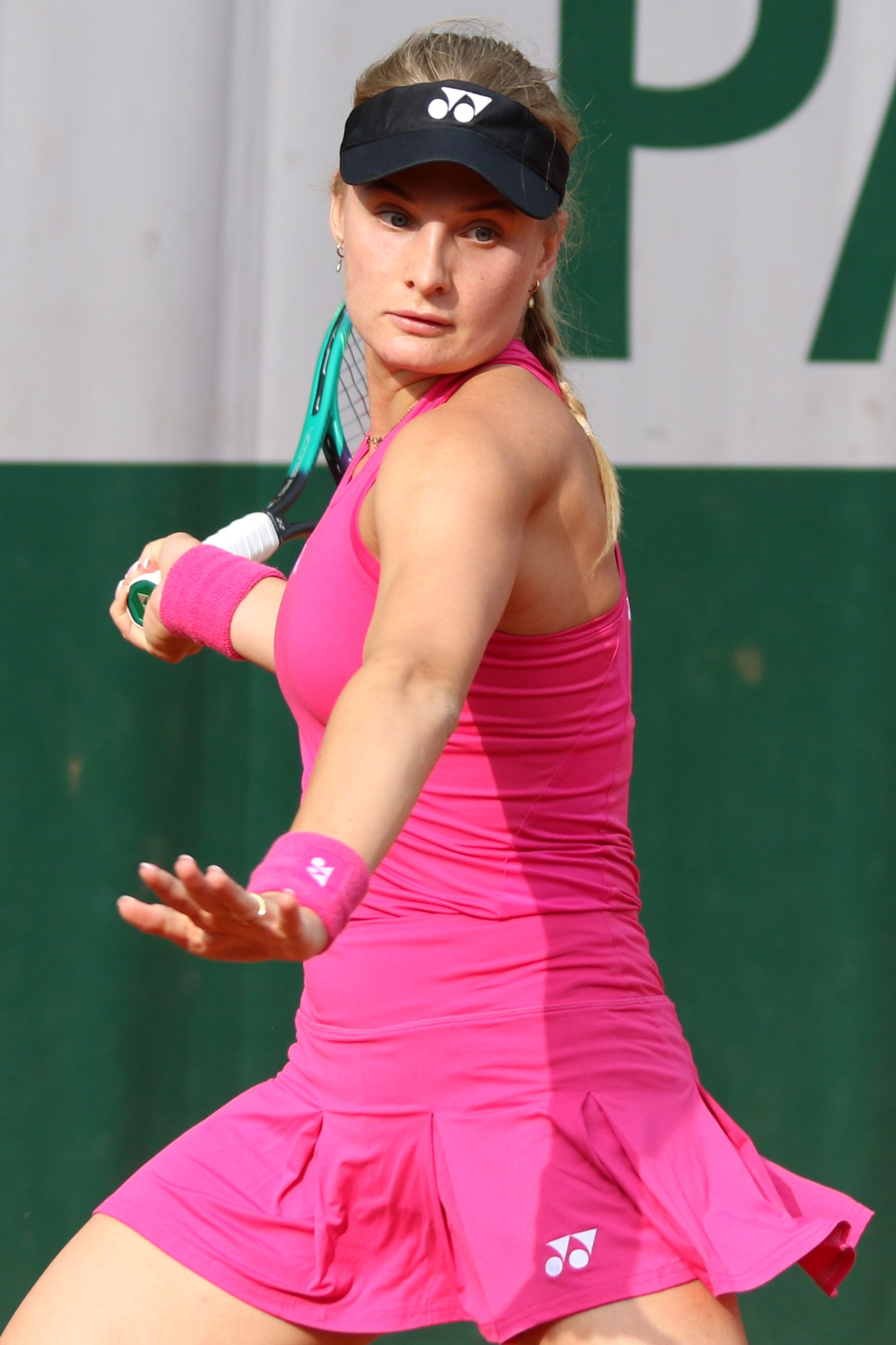
Yastremska at the 2023 French Open.

== Junior Grand Slam tournament finals ==
=== Singles: 1 (runner-up) ===
Result	Year	Tournament	Surface	Opponent	Score
Loss	2016	Wimbledon	Grass	(Russia) Anastasia Potapova	4–6, 3–6

=== Doubles: 1 (runner-up) ===
Result	Year	Tournament	Surface	Partner	Opponents	Score
Loss	2016	Australian Open	Hard	(Ukraine) Anastasia Zarycká	(Russia) Anna Kalinskaya (Slovakia) Tereza Mihalíková	1–6, 1–6

== WTA Tour career earnings ==
current as of 23 May 2022

Year	Grand Slam titles	WTA titles	Total titles	Earnings ($)	Money list rank
2015	0	0	0	1,012	1443
2016	0	0	0	15,970	418
2017	0	0	0	39,851	303
2018	0	1	1	333,427	109
2019	0	2	2	1,224,080	31
2020	0	0	0	486,190	43
2021	0	0	0	232,605	156
2022	0	0	0	237,788	75
Career	0	3	3	2,584,159	220

== Career Grand Slam statistics ==
=== Seedings ===
The tournaments won by Yastremska are in boldface, and advanced into finals by Yastremska are in italics.

Year	Australian Open	French Open	Wimbledon	US Open
2018	did not qualify	absent	did not qualify	not seeded
2019	not seeded	not seeded	not seeded	32nd
2020	23rd	24th	cancelled	19th
2021	absent	absent	absent	not seeded
2022	not seeded	not seeded	not seeded	not seeded
2023	not seeded	qualifier	did not qualify	did not qualify
2024	qualifier	30th	28th	32nd

=== Best Grand Slam tournament results details ===
Australian Open
2024 Australian Open (qualifier)
Round	Opponent	Rank	Score
Q1	(Croatia) Lea Bošković	221	6–3, 4–6, 6–3
Q2	(Greece) Valentini Grammatikopoulou	219	6–4, 3–6, 6–4
Q3	(Australia) Maya Joint (WC)	565	6–2, 1–6, 6–4
1R	(Czech Republic) Markéta Vondroušová (7)	7	6–1, 6–2
2R	(France) Varvara Gracheva	39	6–3, 6–2
3R	(United States) Emma Navarro (27)	26	6–2, 2–6, 6–1
4R	Victoria Azarenka (18)	22	7–6^{(8–6)}, 6–4
QF	(Czech Republic) Linda Nosková	50	6–3, 6–4
SF	(China) Zheng Qinwen (12)	15	4–6, 4–6

Wimbledon Championships
2019 Wimbledon (not seeded)
Round	Opponent	Rank	Score
1R	(Italy) Camila Giorgi	42	6–3, 6–3
2R	(United States) Sofia Kenin (27)	28	7–5, 4–6, 6–3
3R	(Switzerland) Viktorija Golubic	81	7–5, 6–3
4R	(China) Zhang Shuai	50	4–6, 6–1, 2–6

French Open
2024 French Open (30th seeded)
Round	Opponent	Rank	Score
1R	(Australia) Ajla Tomljanović (WC)	202	3–6, 6–3, 6–3
2R	(China) Wang Yafan	68	6–2, 6–0
3R	(United States) Coco Gauff (3)	3	2–6, 4–6

US Open
2019 US Open (32nd seed)
Round	Opponent	Rank	Score
1R	(Romania) Monica Niculescu	105	6–4, 1–6, 6–2
2R	(Sweden) Rebecca Peterson	71	6–4, 6–1
3R	(Ukraine) Elina Svitolina (5)	5	2–6, 0–6

== Wins against top 10 players ==
- She has a 5–19 (21%) record against players who were, at the time the match was played, ranked in the top 10.

No.	Player	Rk	Event	Surface	Rd	Score	Rk	Years	Ref
1.	(Czech Republic) Karolína Plíšková	2	Wuhan Open, China	Hard	3R	6–1, 6–4	27	2019	
2.	(United States) Sofia Kenin	5	Qatar Ladies Open, Qatar	Hard	2R	6–3, 7–6^{(7–4)}	25	2020	
3.	(Czech Republic) Barbora Krejčíková	3	Dubai Championships, UAE	Hard	2R	6–3, 7–6^{(7–3)}	146	2022	
4.	(Czech Republic) Markéta Vondroušová	7	Australian Open, Australia	Hard	1R	6–1, 6–2	96	2024	
5.	(United States) Coco Gauff	2	Wimbledon, United Kingdom	Grass	1R	7–6^{(7–3)}, 6–1	42	2025	

- Key: (Rk) first use, opponent rank; (Rd) round; (Rk) 2nd use, player rank; (Ref) reference; (F) final; (SF) semifinal; (QF) quarterfinal; (#R) rounds 4, 3, 2, 1; (RR) round-robin stage; (Q#) qualifying rounds or stages (3), 2, 1.

== Longest winning streaks ==
=== 8-match win-streak (2018) ===
8 consecutive matches won by Yastremska in the fall of 2018 is the longest win-streak of her career thus far (Hong Kong and Luxembourg).

#	Tournament	Category	Start date	Surface	Round	Opponent	vsRank	Score
–	Beijing Open	Premier Mandatory	October 1	Hard	1R	(China) Zheng Saisai	63	4–6, 3–6
1	Hong Kong Open	International	October 8	Hard	1R	(Hungary) Fanny Stollár	129	6–4, 6–4
2	Hong Kong Open	International	October 8	Hard	2R	(China) Zheng Saisai	58	6–3, 6–3
3	Hong Kong Open	International	October 8	Hard	QF	(Slovakia) Kristína Kučová	317	7–6^{(8–6)}, 6–2
4	Hong Kong Open	International	October 8	Hard	SF	(China) Zhang Shuai	40	7–5, 6–4
5	Hong Kong Open	International	October 8	Hard	F	(China) Wang Qiang	24	6–2, 6–1
6	Luxembourg Open	International	October 15	Hard (i)	1R	(United States) Varvara Lepchenko	168	6–2, 6–7^{(10–12)}, 7–6^{(7–5)}
7	Luxembourg Open	International	October 15	Hard (i)	2R	(Spain) Garbiñe Muguruza	13	6–2, 6–3
8	Luxembourg Open	International	October 15	Hard (i)	QF	(Russia) Margarita Gasparyan	124	6–1, 6–4
–	Luxembourg Open	International	October 15	Hard (i)	SF	(Switzerland) Belinda Bencic	47	2–6, 6–3, 6–7^{(5–7)}
