= 2017 Ladies Open Dunakeszi =

Professional tennis tournament

- Date: 28 August–3 September
- Edition: 1st
- Category: ITF Women's Circuit
- Prize money: $60,000
- Surface: Clay
- Location: Dunakeszi, Hungary

Champions

Singles
- (Ukraine) Dayana Yastremska

Doubles
- (Romania) Irina Bara / (Slovakia) Chantal Škamlová
Ladies Open Dunakeszi	· 2018 →

The 2017 Ladies Open Dunakeszi was a professional tennis tournament played on outdoor clay courts. It was the first edition of the tournament and was part of the 2017 ITF Women's Circuit. It took place in Dunakeszi, Hungary, on 28 August–3 September 2017.

== Singles main draw entrants ==
=== Seeds ===
Country	Player	Rank^{1}	Seed
BEL	Maryna Zanevska	105	1
RUS	Irina Khromacheva	123	2
ITA	Jasmine Paolini	132	3
~~HUN~~	~~Dalma Gálfi~~	~~142~~	~~4~~
ROU	Alexandra Cadanțu	162	5
SUI	Jil Teichmann	182	6
ESP	Sílvia Soler Espinosa	191	7
ROU	Irina Bara	197	8

- ^{1} Rankings as of 21 August 2017.

=== Other entrants ===
The following players received a wildcard into the singles main draw:

- (Hungary) Anna Bondár
- ~~(Hungary) Dalma Gálfi~~
- (Netherlands) Judith van Kessel
- (Romania) Ana Bianca Mihăilă

The following players received entry from the qualifying draw:

- (Hungary) Gréta Arn
- (Hungary) Ágnes Bukta
- (France) Jessika Ponchet
- (Russia) Anastasia Pribylova

The following player received entry as a lucky loser:

- (Hungary) Panna Udvardy

== Champions ==
=== Singles ===
- (Ukraine) Dayana Yastremska def. (Ukraine) Katarina Zavatska, 6–0, 6–1

=== Doubles ===
- (Romania) Irina Bara / (Slovakia) Chantal Škamlová def. (Romania) Alexandra Cadanțu / (Czech Republic) Tereza Smitková, 7–6^{(9–7)}, 6–4
