= 2021 Kuchyně Gorenje Prague Open – Doubles =

Doubles
- 2021 Kuchyně Gorenje Prague Open

Final
- Champions: (Czech Republic) Miriam Kolodziejová (Czech Republic) Jesika Malečková
- Runners-up: (Japan) Kanako Morisaki (Japan) Erika Sema
- Score: 6–3, 1–6, [10–2]

Events
| Singles | Doubles |
| ← 2020 · | Kuchyně Gorenje Prague Open | · 2022 → |

Anastasia Dețiuc and Johana Marková were the defending champions but chose to participate with different partners. Dețiuc partnered alongside Yana Sizikova but lost in the first round to Isabelle Haverlag and Alexandra Ignatik. Marková partnered with Denisa Hindová, but lost in the quarterfinals to Miriam Kolodziejová and Jesika Malečková.

Kolodziejová and Malečková went on to win the title, defeating Kanako Morisaki and Erika Sema in the final, 6–3, 1–6, [10–2].

== Seeds ==
1. (Czech Republic) Anastasia Dețiuc / (Russia) Yana Sizikova (first round)
2. (Switzerland) Leonie Küng / (Ukraine) Valeriya Strakhova (first round)
3. (Japan) Kanako Morisaki / (Japan) Erika Sema (final)
4. (Czech Republic) Miriam Kolodziejová / (Czech Republic) Jesika Malečková (champions)

== Draw ==
=== Key ===
- Q = Qualifier
- WC = Wild card
- LL = Lucky loser
- Alt = Alternate
- SE = Special exempt
- PR = Protected ranking
- ITF = ITF entry
- JE = Junior exempt
- w/o = Walkover
- r = Retired
- d = Defaulted
- SR = Special ranking

=== Draw ===
First round
1 | (Czech Republic) A Dețiuc (Russia) Y Sizikova | 1 | 6 | [9]
(Netherlands) I Haverlag (Romania) A Ignatik | 6 | 3 | [11]
(United Kingdom) E Appleton (Netherlands) A Hartono | 6 | 4 | [10]
WC | (Czech Republic) P Kubíková (Czech Republic) B Palicová | 1 | 6 | [2]
3 | (Japan) K Morisaki (Japan) E Sema | 6 | 6
WC | (Czech Republic) M Přádová (Czech Republic) K Vlčková | 2 | 0
(Czech Republic) A Laboutková (Slovakia) Z Zlochová | 3 | 1
(Japan) M Kawamura (Japan) F Kozaki | 6 | 6
(Australia) A Bozovic (Serbia) N Stevanović | 4 | 0
(Czech Republic) D Hindová (Czech Republic) J Marková | 6 | 6
(Italy) L Bronzetti (Hungary) P Udvardy
4 | (Czech Republic) M Kolodziejová (Czech Republic) J Malečková | w/o
(Czech Republic) S Bejlek (Czech Republic) L Nosková | 6 | 6
WC | (Czech Republic) A Nová (Czech Republic) V Vlkovská | 3 | 4
(United Kingdom) SB Grey (Czech Republic) T Smitková | 6^{3} | 6 | [10]
2 | (Switzerland) L Küng (Ukraine) V Strakhova | 7^{7} | 3 | [8]

Quarterfinals
(Netherlands) I Haverlag (Romania) A Ignatik | 6 | 7^{7}
(United Kingdom) E Appleton (Netherlands) A Hartono | 4 | 6^{4}
3 | (Japan) K Morisaki (Japan) E Sema | 6 | 5 | [14]
(Japan) M Kawamura (Japan) F Kozaki | 2 | 7 | [12]
(Czech Republic) D Hindová (Czech Republic) J Marková | 0 | 4
4 | (Czech Republic) M Kolodziejová (Czech Republic) J Malečková | 6 | 6
(Czech Republic) S Bejlek (Czech Republic) L Nosková | 7 | 6
(United Kingdom) SB Grey (Czech Republic) T Smitková | 5 | 0

Semifinals
(Netherlands) I Haverlag (Romania) A Ignatik | 3 | 4
3 | (Japan) K Morisaki (Japan) E Sema | 6 | 6
4 | (Czech Republic) M Kolodziejová (Czech Republic) J Malečková | 6 | 6
(Czech Republic) S Bejlek (Czech Republic) L Nosková | 3 | 1

Final
3 | (Japan) K Morisaki (Japan) E Sema | 3 | 6 | [2]
4 | (Czech Republic) M Kolodziejová (Czech Republic) J Malečková | 6 | 1 | [10]
