= 2021 Kuchyně Gorenje Prague Open =

Tennis tournament

- Date: 30 August–5 September 2021
- Edition: 8th
- Category: ITF Women's World Tennis Tour
- Prize money: $60,000
- Surface: Clay
- Location: Prague, Czech Republic

Champions

Singles
- (Poland) Magdalena Fręch

Doubles
- (Czech Republic) Miriam Kolodziejová / (Czech Republic) Jesika Malečková
- Kuchyně Gorenje Prague Open

The 2021 Kuchyně Gorenje Prague Open was a professional women's tennis tournament played on outdoor clay courts. It was the eighth edition of the tournament which was part of the 2021 ITF Women's World Tennis Tour. It took place in Prague, Czech Republic between 30 August and 5 September 2021.

== Singles main-draw entrants ==
=== Seeds ===
Country	Player	Rank^{1}	Seed
POL	Magdalena Fręch	123	1
POL	Katarzyna Kawa	164	2
HUN	Panna Udvardy	168	3
SUI	Leonie Küng	169	4
ITA	Lucia Bronzetti	172	5
SVK	Rebecca Šramková	187	6
ITA	Lucrezia Stefanini	213	7
FRA	Diane Parry	223	8

- ^{1} Rankings are as of 23 August 2021.

=== Other entrants ===
The following players received wildcards into the singles main draw:

- (Czech Republic) Sára Bejlek
- (Czech Republic) Monika Kilnarová
- (Czech Republic) Linda Nosková
- (Czech Republic) Darja Viďmanová

The following players received entry from the qualifying draw:

- (Australia) Alexandra Bozovic
- (Slovenia) Tina Cvetkovič
- (Germany) Anna Gabric
- (Israel) Lina Glushko
- (Japan) Mana Kawamura
- (France) Alice Ramé
- (Czech Republic) Tereza Smitková
- (Ukraine) Valeriya Strakhova

== Champions ==
=== Singles ===
- (Poland) Magdalena Fręch def. (Czech Republic) Tereza Smitková, 6–2, 6–1

=== Doubles ===
- (Czech Republic) Miriam Kolodziejová / (Czech Republic) Jesika Malečková def. (Japan) Kanako Morisaki / (Japan) Erika Sema, 6–3, 1–6, [10–2]
