= 2022 Kuchyně Gorenje Prague Open =

Tennis tournament

- Date: 28 August–4 September 2022
- Edition: 9th
- Category: ITF Women's World Tennis Tour
- Prize money: $60,000
- Surface: Clay / Outdoor
- Location: Prague, Czech Republic

Champions

Singles
- (Hungary) Réka Luca Jani

Doubles
- (France) Elixane Lechemia / (Germany) Julia Lohoff
- Kuchyně Gorenje Prague Open

The 2022 Kuchyně Gorenje Prague Open was a professional tennis tournament played on outdoor clay courts. It was the ninth edition of the tournament which was part of the 2022 ITF Women's World Tennis Tour. It took place in Prague, Czech Republic between 28 August and 4 September 2022.

== Champions ==
=== Singles ===
- (Hungary) Réka Luca Jani def. (Germany) Noma Noha Akugue, 6–3, 7–6^{(7–4)}

=== Doubles ===
- (France) Elixane Lechemia / (Germany) Julia Lohoff def. (Czech Republic) Linda Klimovičová / (Czech Republic) Dominika Šalková, 7–5, 7–5

== Singles main draw entrants ==
=== Seeds ===
| Country | Player | Rank^{1} | Seed |
|---|---|---|---|
| AUT | Julia Grabher | 122 | 1 |
| HUN | Réka Luca Jani | 134 | 2 |
| ARG | María Lourdes Carlé | 175 | 3 |
| GRE | Despina Papamichail | 187 | 4 |
| CZE | Jesika Malečková | 210 | 5 |
| MKD | Lina Gjorcheska | 237 | 6 |
| BIH | Dea Herdželaš | 251 | 7 |
| TUR | Çağla Büyükakçay | 264 | 8 |
| FRA | Carole Monnet | 269 | 9 |
| ESP | Ángela Fita Boluda | 274 | 10 |
| CRO | Lea Bošković | 276 | 11 |
| BRA | Gabriela Cé | 289 | 12 |
| NED | Eva Vedder | 290 | 13 |
| ESP | Irene Burillo Escorihuela | 291 | 14 |
| CHI | Daniela Seguel | 293 | 15 |
| | Vera Lapko | 299 | 16 |

- ^{1} Rankings are as of 22 August 2022.

=== Other entrants ===
The following players received wildcards into the singles main draw:

- (Czech Republic) Linda Klimovičová
- (Czech Republic) Aneta Laboutková
- (Czech Republic) Julie Štruplová
- (Czech Republic) Tereza Valentová
- (Czech Republic) Karolína Vlčková

The following players received entry from the qualifying draw:

- (Slovenia) Veronika Erjavec
- (Japan) Funa Kozaki
- (Japan) Misaki Matsuda
- (Germany) Luisa Meyer auf der Heide
- (Czech Republic) Barbora Michálková
- (United States) Chiara Scholl
- (Czech Republic) Ivana Šebestová
- (Italy) Aurora Zantedeschi

The following player received entry as a lucky loser:

- (United Kingdom) Amanda Carreras
