= 2022 Kuchyně Gorenje Prague Open – Singles =

Singles
- 2022 Kuchyně Gorenje Prague Open

Final
- Champion: (Hungary) Réka Luca Jani
- Runner-up: (Germany) Noma Noha Akugue
- Score: 6–3, 7–6^{(7–4)}

Events
Singles	Doubles
← 2021 ·	Kuchyně Gorenje Prague Open	· 2023 →

Magdalena Fręch was the defending champion, but chose to compete at the US Open instead.

Réka Luca Jani won the title, defeating Noma Noha Akugue in the final, 6–3, 7–6^{(7–4)}.

== Seeds ==
All seeds receive a bye into the second round.

1. (Austria) Julia Grabher (quarterfinals)
2. (Hungary) Réka Luca Jani (champion)
3. (Argentina) María Lourdes Carlé (semifinals)
4. (Greece) Despina Papamichail (second round)
5. (Czech Republic) Jesika Malečková (third round)
6. (North Macedonia) Lina Gjorcheska (second round)
7. (Bosnia and Herzegovina) Dea Herdželaš (third round)
8. (Turkey) Çağla Büyükakçay (third round)
9. (France) Carole Monnet (second round)
10. (Spain) Ángela Fita Boluda (quarterfinals)
11. (Croatia) Lea Bošković (second round)
12. (Brazil) Gabriela Cé (second round)
13. (Netherlands) Eva Vedder (third round)
14. (Spain) Irene Burillo Escorihuela (third round)
15. (Chile) Daniela Seguel (second round)
16. Vera Lapko (second round)

== Draw ==
=== Key ===
- Q = Qualifier
- WC = Wild card
- LL = Lucky loser
- Alt = Alternate
- ITF = ITF entry
- PR = Protected ranking
- SR = Special ranking
- SE = Special exempt
- JE = Junior exempt
- JR = Junior Accelerator Programme entrant
- CO = College Accelerator Programme entrant
- NG = Next Gen Accelerator Program entrant
- w/o = Walkover
- r = Retired
- d = Defaulted

=== Finals ===
Quarterfinals
1	(Austria) Julia Grabher	4	2
SE	(Germany) Noma Noha Akugue	6	6
3	(Argentina) María Lourdes Carlé	7^{7}	6
Q	(Slovenia) Veronika Erjavec	6^{1}	1
Q	(Japan) Misaki Matsuda	6	6^{8}	6
(Czech Republic) Barbora Palicová	4	7^{10}	1
10	(Spain) Ángela Fita Boluda	4	6	4
2	(Hungary) Réka Luca Jani	6	2	6

Semifinals
SE	(Germany) Noma Noha Akugue	6	4	6
3	(Argentina) María Lourdes Carlé	2	6	4
Q	(Japan) Misaki Matsuda	3	6^{1}
2	(Hungary) Réka Luca Jani	6	7^{7}

Final
SE	(Germany) Noma Noha Akugue	3	6^{4}
2	(Hungary) Réka Luca Jani	6	7^{7}

=== Top half ===
==== Section 1 ====
First round
(United States) E Halbauer	5	7	6
Q	(Czech Republic) B Michálková	7	5	1
WC	(Czech Republic) T Valentová	3	6	1
Q	(Germany) L Meyer auf der Heide	6	3	6
SE	(Germany) N Noha Akugue	6^{6}	6	6
(Spain) G Maristany	7^{8}	1	2
(Czech Republic) M Kolodziejová	6	6
LL	(United Kingdom) A Carreras	2	2

Second round
1	(Austria) J Grabher	6	6
(United States) E Halbauer	3	4
Q	(Germany) L Meyer auf der Heide	4	6^{3}
13	(Netherlands) E Vedder	6	7^{7}
11	(Croatia) L Bošković	1	1
SE	(Germany) N Noha Akugue	6	6
(Czech Republic) M Kolodziejová	3	4
8	(Turkey) Ç Büyükakçay	6	6

Third round
1	(Austria) J Grabher	6	6
13	(Netherlands) E Vedder	1	4
SE	(Germany) N Noha Akugue	7^{8}	6
8	(Turkey) Ç Büyükakçay	6^{6}	2

Quarterfinals
1	(Austria) J Grabher	4	2
SE	(Germany) N Noha Akugue	6	6

==== Section 2 ====
First round
(Sweden) C Hennemann	1	0^{r}
WC	(Czech Republic) L Klimovičová	6	1
Q	(Japan) F Kozaki	3	3
Q	(United States) C Scholl	6	6
Q	(Slovenia) V Erjavec	6	6
WC	(Czech Republic) A Laboutková	2	1
(Burundi) S Nahimana	6	7^{7}
(Australia) A Bozovic	3	6^{4}

Second round
3	(Argentina) ML Carlé	6	6
WC	(Czech Republic) L Klimovičová	3	3
Q	(United States) C Scholl	6	3	2
14	(Spain) I Burillo Escorihuela	4	6	6
9	(France) C Monnet	5	1
Q	(Slovenia) V Erjavec	7	6
(Burundi) S Nahimana	1	0^{r}
5	(Czech Republic) J Malečková	6	1

Third round
3	(Argentina) ML Carlé	3	6	6
14	(Spain) I Burillo Escorihuela	6	3	3
Q	(Slovenia) V Erjavec	6	6
5	(Czech Republic) J Malečková	3	4

Quarterfinals
3	(Argentina) ML Carlé	7^{7}	6
Q	(Slovenia) V Erjavec	6^{1}	1

=== Bottom half ===
==== Section 3 ====
First round
(Spain) A Mintegi del Olmo	7^{7}	1	7
(Czech Republic) T Smitková	6^{3}	6	5
Q	(Japan) M Matsuda	3	6	6
(Greece) S Sakellaridi	6	4	0
(Italy) A Turati	7^{7}	4	3
(Czech Republic) D Šalková	6^{5}	6	6
Q	(Italy) A Zantedeschi	2	2
(Czech Republic) B Palicová	6	6

Second round
6	(North Macedonia) L Gjorcheska	6	0	0
(Spain) A Mintegi del Olmo	3	6	6
Q	(Japan) M Matsuda	5	6	6
12	(Brazil) G Cé	7	2	1
15	(Chile) D Seguel	3	5
(Czech Republic) D Šalková	6	7
(Czech Republic) B Palicová	6	7
4	(Greece) D Papamichail	4	5

Third round
(Spain) A Mintegi del Olmo	2	2
Q	(Japan) M Matsuda	6	6
(Czech Republic) D Šalková	2	4
(Czech Republic) B Palicová	6	6

Quarterfinals
Q	(Japan) M Matsuda	6	6^{8}	6
(Czech Republic) B Palicová	4	7^{10}	1

==== Section 4 ====
First round
WC	(Czech Republic) J Štruplová	5	2
(Slovakia) R Šramková	7	6
(Venezuela) A Gámiz	4	6	6
(United Kingdom) M Mutavdzic	6	4	0
(Romania) IG Ghioroaie	6	6^{5}	3
(Czech Republic) N Bartůňková	4	7^{7}	6
WC	(Czech Republic) K Vlčková	1	0
Q	(Czech Republic) I Šebestová	6	6

Second round
7	(Bosnia and Herzegovina) D Herdželaš	7^{7}	6
(Slovakia) R Šramková	6^{5}	3
(Venezuela) A Gámiz	7^{7}	2	0
10	(Spain) Á Fita Boluda	6^{3}	6	6
16	V Lapko	6	4	4
(Czech Republic) N Bartůňková	2	6	6
Q	(Czech Republic) I Šebestová	1	4
2	(Hungary) RL Jani	6	6

Third round
7	(Bosnia and Herzegovina) D Herdželaš	0	1
10	(Spain) Á Fita Boluda	6	6
(Czech Republic) N Bartůňková	1	4
2	(Hungary) RL Jani	6	6

Quarterfinals
10	(Spain) Á Fita Boluda	4	6	4
2	(Hungary) RL Jani	6	2	6
