= 2017 Ladies Open Dunakeszi – Singles =

Singles
- 2017 Ladies Open Dunakeszi

Final
- Champion: (Ukraine) Dayana Yastremska
- Runner-up: (Ukraine) Katarina Zavatska
- Score: 6–0, 6–1

Events
| Singles | Doubles |
| Ladies Open Dunakeszi | · 2018 → |

This was the first edition of the tournament.

Dayana Yastremska won the title after defeating Katarina Zavatska 6–0, 6–1 in the final.

== Seeds ==
1. (Belgium) Maryna Zanevska (first round, retired)
2. (Russia) Irina Khromacheva (first round)
3. (Italy) Jasmine Paolini (second round)
4. (Hungary) Dalma Gálfi (withdrew)
5. (Romania) Alexandra Cadanțu (semifinals)
6. (Switzerland) Jil Teichmann (second round)
7. (Spain) Sílvia Soler Espinosa (first round)
8. (Romania) Irina Bara (quarterfinals)

== Draw ==
=== Key ===
- Q = Qualifier
- WC = Wild card
- LL = Lucky loser
- Alt = Alternate
- SE = Special exempt
- PR = Protected ranking
- ITF = ITF entry
- JE = Junior exempt
- w/o = Walkover
- r = Retired
- d = Defaulted
- SR = Special ranking

=== Finals ===
Semifinals
5 | (Romania) Alexandra Cadanțu | 6 | 3 | 3
(Ukraine) Katarina Zavatska | 3 | 6 | 6
LL | (Hungary) Panna Udvardy | 3 | 3
(Ukraine) Dayana Yastremska | 6 | 6

Final
(Ukraine) Katarina Zavatska | 0 | 1
(Ukraine) Dayana Yastremska | 6 | 6

=== Top half ===
First round
1 | (Belgium) M Zanevska | 1^{r}
(Czech Republic) T Smitková | 4
(Romania) A Dulgheru | 3 | 6 | 3
(Netherlands) C Burger | 6 | 1 | 6
Q | (Hungary) G Arn | 7^{8} | 6
(Norway) U Eikeri | 6^{6} | 4
(Argentina) C Pella | 0^{r}
5 | (Romania) A Cadanțu | 3
3 | (Italy) J Paolini | 6 | 7^{7}
(Italy) J Pieri | 1 | 6^{3}
(Ukraine) K Zavatska | 4
(North Macedonia) L Gjorcheska | 1^{r}
Q | (France) J Ponchet | 4 | 2
(Slovenia) P Hercog | 6 | 6
(Czech Republic) J Malečková | 6^{4} | 4
8 | (Romania) I Bara | 7^{7} | 6

Second round
(Czech Republic) T Smitková | 6 | 2 | 6
(Netherlands) C Burger | 4 | 6 | 3
Q | (Hungary) G Arn | 6 | 4 | 2
5 | (Romania) A Cadanțu | 3 | 6 | 6
3 | (Italy) J Paolini | 6 | 4 | 2
(Ukraine) K Zavatska | 3 | 6 | 6
(Slovenia) P Hercog | 2 | 6^{4}
8 | (Romania) I Bara | 6 | 7^{7}

Quarterfinals
(Czech Republic) T Smitková | 2 | 2
5 | (Romania) A Cadanțu | 6 | 6
(Ukraine) K Zavatska | 7^{7} | 6
8 | (Romania) I Bara | 6^{1} | 3

Semifinals
5 | (Romania) A Cadanțu | 6 | 3 | 3
(Ukraine) K Zavatska | 3 | 6 | 6

=== Bottom half ===
First round
6 | (Switzerland) J Teichmann | 6 | 0
(Croatia) T Lukas | 1 | 0^{r}
Q | (Hungary) Á Bukta | 6 | 6
(Spain) MT Torró Flor | 1 | 0
WC | (Netherlands) J van Kessel | 1 | 3
(Bulgaria) I Shinikova | 6 | 6
(Spain) O Sáez Larra | 4 | 1
LL | (Hungary) P Udvardy | 6 | 6
7 | (Spain) S Soler Espinosa | 2 | 3
(Ukraine) D Yastremska | 6 | 6
(Slovakia) C Škamlová | 6 | 6
(Serbia) D Radanović | 4 | 3
WC | (Romania) AB Mihăilă | 2 | 4
WC | (Hungary) A Bondár | 6 | 6
Q | (Russia) A Pribylova | 6^{6} | 6 | 6
2 | (Russia) I Khromacheva | 7^{8} | 4 | 2

Second round
6 | (Switzerland) J Teichmann | 1 | 5
Q | (Hungary) Á Bukta | 6 | 7
(Bulgaria) I Shinikova | 1 | 6 | 5
LL | (Hungary) P Udvardy | 6 | 3 | 7
(Ukraine) D Yastremska | 4 | 6 | 6
(Slovakia) C Škamlová | 6 | 3 | 3
WC | (Hungary) A Bondár | 6 | 2 | 7
Q | (Russia) A Pribylova | 4 | 6 | 5

Quarterfinals
Q | (Hungary) Á Bukta | 6^{4} | 2
LL | (Hungary) P Udvardy | 7^{7} | 6
(Ukraine) D Yastremska | 6 | 6
WC | (Hungary) A Bondár | 2 | 3

Semifinals
LL | (Hungary) P Udvardy | 3 | 3
(Ukraine) D Yastremska | 6 | 6
