= 2023 Kuchyně Gorenje Prague Open – Singles =

Singles
- 2023 Kuchyně Gorenje Prague Open

Final
- Champion: (Romania) Andreea Mitu
- Runner-up: (Czech Republic) Sára Bejlek
- Score: 7–6^{(7–1)} 2–6, 6–3

Events
Singles	Doubles
← 2022 ·	Kuchyně Gorenje Prague Open	· 2024 →

Réka Luca Jani was the defending champion, but she lost in the second round to Anca Todoni.

Andreea Mitu won the title, defeating Sára Bejlek in the final, 7–6^{(7–1)} 2–6, 6–3.

== Seeds ==
All seeds receive a bye into the second round.

1. (Hungary) Dalma Gálfi (second round)
2. (Hungary) Réka Luca Jani (second round)
3. (Czech Republic) Gabriela Knutson (withdrew)
4. (Czech Republic) Sára Bejlek (finals)
5. (Romania) Irina Bara (quarterfinals)
6. (Turkey) Berfu Cengiz (third round)
7. (United Kingdom) Sonay Kartal (second round)
8. (Australia) Seone Mendez (semifinals)
9. (Ukraine) Valeriya Strakhova (second round)
10. (Greece) Sapfo Sakellaridi (third round)
11. (Croatia) Lea Bošković (third round)
12. (Italy) Camilla Rosatello (semifinals)
13. (Germany) Katharina Hobgarski (quarterfinals)
14. (Czech Republic) Julie Štruplová (third round)
15. (Romania) Andreea Prisăcariu (third round)
16. (Czech Republic) Dominika Šalková (third round)

== Draw ==
=== Key ===
- Q = Qualifier
- WC = Wild card
- LL = Lucky loser
- Alt = Alternate
- SE = Special exempt
- PR = Protected ranking
- ITF = ITF entry
- JE = Junior exempt
- w/o = Walkover
- r = Retired
- d = Defaulted
- SR = Special ranking

=== Finals ===
Quarterfinals
13	(Germany) Katharina Hobgarski	3	3
8	(Australia) Seone Mendez	6	6
4	(Czech Republic) Sára Bejlek	6	6
5	(Romania) Irina Bara	3	4
(Romania) Andreea Mitu	1	6	6
(Ukraine) Anastasiya Soboleva	6	2	0
12	(Italy) Camilla Rosatello	6	6
(Romania) Anca Todoni	2	3

Semifinals
8	(Australia) Seone Mendez	3	6^{6}
4	(Czech Republic) Sára Bejlek	6	7^{8}
(Romania) Andreea Mitu	6	6
12	(Italy) Camilla Rosatello	3	2

Final
4	(Czech Republic) Sára Bejlek	6^{1}	6	3
(Romania) Andreea Mitu	7^{7}	2	6

=== Top half ===
==== Section 1 ====
First round
(Slovakia) R Zelníčková	2	5
(Slovenia) P Lovrič	6	7
WC	(Germany) J Vanik	6	2	4
Q	(Slovakia) M Okáľová	3	6	6
(Georgia (country)) E Gorgodze	6	6
WC	(Czech Republic) T Krejčová	1	1
(Japan) R Saigo	1	0
Q	(Poland) M Kubka	6	6

Second round
1	(Hungary) D Gálfi	3	1
(Slovenia) P Lovrič	6	6
Q	(Slovakia) M Okáľová	3	6	2
13	(Germany) K Hobgarski	6	2	6
10	(Greece) S Sakellaridi	1	6	6
(Georgia (country)) E Gorgodze	6	3	2
Q	(Poland) M Kubka	4	2
8	(Australia) S Mendez	6	6

Third round
(Slovenia) P Lovrič	4	6	6^{1}
13	(Germany) K Hobgarski	6	1	7^{7}
10	(Greece) S Sakellaridi	2	6^{2}
8	(Australia) S Mendez	6	7^{7}

Quarterfinals
13	(Germany) K Hobgarski	3	3
8	(Australia) S Mendez	6	6

==== Section 2 ====
First round
(Czech Republic) A Kučmová	6^{2}	6	7^{8}
(Kazakhstan) Z Kulambayeva	7^{7}	0	6^{6}
(Italy) A Moratelli	6	3	6
LL	(Slovakia) K Strešnaková	4	6	3
Q	(Romania) A Vasilescu	0	3
(United States) C Scholl	6	6
WC	(Czech Republic) V Bervid	6	6
Q	(France) S Iliev	4	4

Second round
4	(Czech Republic) S Bejlek	w/o
(Czech Republic) A Kučmová
(Italy) A Moratelli	3	1
16	(Czech Republic) D Šalková	6	6
11	(Croatia) L Bošković	7	6
(United States) C Scholl	5	4
WC	(Czech Republic) V Bervid	2	0^{r}
5	(Romania) I Bara	6	0

Third round
4	(Czech Republic) S Bejlek	6	6
16	(Czech Republic) D Šalková	2	3
11	(Croatia) L Bošković	0	5
5	(Romania) I Bara	6	7

Quarterfinals
4	(Czech Republic) S Bejlek	6	6
5	(Romania) I Bara	3	4

=== Bottom half ===
==== Section 3 ====
First round
WC	(Czech Republic) J Paštiková	3	6	6
WC	(Czech Republic) A Šmejkalová	6	2	1
(Romania) A Mitu	3	6	6
(Czech Republic) I Šebestová	6	0	2
(Czech Republic) T Smitková	2	3
(Czech Republic) L Klimovičová	6	6
(France) A Ramé	0	5
(Ukraine) A Soboleva	6	7

Second round
6	(Turkey) B Cengiz	3	6	7
WC	(Czech Republic) J Paštiková	6	3	5
(Romania) A Mitu	7^{7}	6
9	(Ukraine) V Strakhova	6^{3}	2
14	(Czech Republic) J Štruplová	6	6
(Czech Republic) L Klimovičová	3	3
(Ukraine) A Soboleva	6	4	6
Q	(Georgia (country)) S Shapatava	2	6	1

Third round
6	(Turkey) B Cengiz	2	6^{3}
(Romania) A Mitu	6	7^{7}
14	(Czech Republic) J Štruplová	3	4
(Ukraine) A Soboleva	6	6

Quarterfinals
(Romania) A Mitu	1	6	6
(Ukraine) A Soboleva	6	2	0

==== Section 4 ====
First round
Q	(Hungary) L Udvardy	5	6	4
(Hungary) AK Tóth	7	0	0^{r}
(Romania) O Gavrilă	2	3
Q	(Poland) M Chwalińska	6	6
(Slovakia) K Kužmová	1	2
Q	(Italy) T Pieri	6	6
(Romania) A Todoni	6	6
(Italy) A Zantedeschi	3	2

Second round
7	(United Kingdom) S Kartal	2	5
Q	(Hungary) L Udvardy	6	7
Q	(Poland) M Chwalińska	3	6^{4}
12	(Italy) C Rosatello	6	7^{7}
15	(Romania) A Prisăcariu	6	6
Q	(Italy) T Pieri	3	0
(Romania) A Todoni	2	6	6
2	(Hungary) RL Jani	6	4	1

Third round
Q	(Hungary) L Udvardy	4	4
12	(Italy) C Rosatello	6	6
15	(Romania) A Prisăcariu	4	5
(Romania) A Todoni	6	7

Quarterfinals
12	(Italy) C Rosatello	6	6
(Romania) A Todoni	2	3
