= 2021 Kuchyně Gorenje Prague Open – Singles =

Singles
- 2021 Kuchyně Gorenje Prague Open

Final
- Champion: (Poland) Magdalena Fręch
- Runner-up: (Czech Republic) Tereza Smitková
- Score: 6–2, 6–1

Events
Singles	Doubles
← 2020 ·	Kuchyně Gorenje Prague Open	· 2022 →

Jana Čepelová was the defending champion but chose not to participate.

Magdalena Fręch won the title, defeating Tereza Smitková in the final, 6–2, 6–1.

== Seeds ==
1. (Poland) Magdalena Fręch (champion)
2. (Poland) Katarzyna Kawa (second round)
3. (Hungary) Panna Udvardy (first round)
4. (Switzerland) Leonie Küng (first round)
5. (Italy) Lucia Bronzetti (second round)
6. (Slovakia) Rebecca Šramková (quarterfinals)
7. (Italy) Lucrezia Stefanini (first round)
8. (France) Diane Parry (semifinals)

== Draw ==
=== Key ===
- Q = Qualifier
- WC = Wild card
- LL = Lucky loser
- Alt = Alternate
- SE = Special exempt
- PR = Protected ranking
- ITF = ITF entry
- JE = Junior exempt
- w/o = Walkover
- r = Retired
- d = Defaulted
- SR = Special ranking

=== Finals ===
Semifinals
1	(Poland) Magdalena Fręch	6	6
8	(France) Diane Parry	3	3
(Latvia) Daniela Vismane	4	3
Q	(Czech Republic) Tereza Smitková	6	6

Final
1	(Poland) Magdalena Fręch	6	6
Q	(Czech Republic) Tereza Smitková	2	1

=== Top half ===
First round
1	(Poland) M Fręch	7	6
(Czech Republic) J Malečková	5	1
(Romania) A Ignatik	6	6
Q	(Ukraine) V Strakhova	2	1
WC	(Czech Republic) L Nosková	7	6
WC	(Czech Republic) D Viďmanová	5	1
(Brazil) G Cé	6^{4}	7^{7}	1
5	(Italy) L Bronzetti	7^{7}	6^{2}	6
3	(Hungary) P Udvardy	3	1
Q	(Israel) L Glushko	6	6
(Netherlands) R Hogenkamp	6	0	2
(Netherlands) A Hartono	4	6	6
(Serbia) N Stevanović	6^{5}	7^{10}	6
WC	(Czech Republic) M Kilnarová	7^{7}	6^{8}	2
(Czech Republic) M Kolodziejová	7^{7}	3	4
8	(France) D Parry	6^{5}	6	6

Second round
1	(Poland) M Fręch	7^{7}	6
(Romania) A Ignatik	6^{3}	3
WC	(Czech Republic) L Nosková	6^{5}	6	7
5	(Italy) L Bronzetti	7^{7}	4	5
Q	(Israel) L Glushko	3	6	7^{8}
(Netherlands) A Hartono	6	2	6^{6}
(Serbia) N Stevanović	3	1
8	(France) D Parry	6	6

Quarterfinals
1	(Poland) M Fręch	7^{7}	6
WC	(Czech Republic) L Nosková	6^{6}	2
Q	(Israel) L Glushko	1	3
8	(France) D Parry	6	6

Semifinals
1	(Poland) M Fręch	6	6
8	(France) D Parry	3	3

=== Bottom half ===
First round
6	(Slovakia) R Šramková	7	6
Q	(Germany) A Gabric	5	1
Q	(Japan) M Kawamura	7	3	6
Q	(Australia) A Bozovic	5	6	4
(Slovakia) Z Zlochová	0	3
Q	(Slovenia) T Cvetkovič	6	6
(Latvia) D Vismane	6	6
4	(Switzerland) L Küng	3	4
7	(Italy) L Stefanini	2	6^{2}
(South Korea) S-j Jang	6	7^{7}
WC	(Czech Republic) S Bejlek	6^{4}	6	6
(Italy) M Di Giuseppe	7^{7}	3	3
Q	(Czech Republic) T Smitková	6	3	6
Q	(France) A Ramé	2	6	3
(Netherlands) S Lamens	1	2
2	(Poland) K Kawa	6	6

Second round
6	(Slovakia) R Šramková	6	6
Q	(Japan) M Kawamura	1	2
Q	(Slovenia) T Cvetkovič	3	0
(Latvia) D Vismane	6	6
(South Korea) S-j Jang	6	6^{1}	1
WC	(Czech Republic) S Bejlek	2	7^{7}	6
Q	(Czech Republic) T Smitková	6	6^{4}	7^{7}
2	(Poland) K Kawa	2	7^{7}	6^{4}

Quarterfinals
6	(Slovakia) R Šramková	2	5
(Latvia) D Vismane	6	7
WC	(Czech Republic) S Bejlek	3	2
Q	(Czech Republic) T Smitková	6	6

Semifinals
(Latvia) D Vismane	4	3
Q	(Czech Republic) T Smitková	6	6
