= 2017 Ladies Open Dunakeszi – Doubles =

Doubles
- 2017 Ladies Open Dunakeszi

Final
- Champion: (Romania) Irina Bara (Slovakia) Chantal Škamlová
- Runner-up: (Romania) Alexandra Cadanțu (Czech Republic) Tereza Smitková
- Score: 7–6^{(9–7)}, 6–4

Events
Singles	Doubles
Ladies Open Dunakeszi	· 2018 →

This was the first edition of the tournament.

Irina Bara and Chantal Škamlová won the title after defeating Alexandra Cadanțu and Tereza Smitková 7–6^{(9–7)}, 6–4 in the final.

== Seeds ==
1. (Russia) Irina Khromacheva / (Belgium) Maryna Zanevska (withdrew)
2. (India) Prarthana Thombare / (Netherlands) Eva Wacanno (first round)
3. (Spain) Sílvia Soler Espinosa / (Switzerland) Jil Teichmann (quarterfinals)
4. (Romania) Irina Bara / (Slovakia) Chantal Škamlová (champions)

== Draw ==
=== Key ===
- Q = Qualifier
- WC = Wild card
- LL = Lucky loser
- Alt = Alternate
- SE = Special exempt
- PR = Protected ranking
- ITF = ITF entry
- JE = Junior exempt
- w/o = Walkover
- r = Retired
- d = Defaulted
- SR = Special ranking

First round
Alt	(Hungary) R Bartosik (Hungary) N Müller	0	0
(Belarus) S Pirazhenka (France) J Ponchet	6	6
(Hungary) Á Bukta (Slovakia) V Juhászová	6^{4}	6	[10]
(United States) S Marand (United States) S Santamaria	7^{7}	0	[7]
4	(Romania) I Bara (Slovakia) C Škamlová	6	6
(Ukraine) V Kapshay (Russia) A Pribylova	1	3
(Czech Republic) J Malečková (Bulgaria) I Shinikova	2	6^{3}
(Sweden) J Cabaj Awad (Norway) U Eikeri	6	7^{7}
WC	(Hungary) A Bondár (Hungary) RL Jani	6	4	[11]
(Australia) S Mendez (Hungary) P Udvardy	2	6	[9]
(Italy) L Stefanini (Russia) E Yashina	3	3
3	(Spain) S Soler Espinosa (Switzerland) J Teichmann	6	6
(Finland) E Laine (Japan) K Takahata	4	4
(Romania) A Cadanțu (Czech Republic) T Smitková	6	6
WC	(Romania) AB Mihăilă (Hungary) S Szlavikovics	6	6
2	(India) P Thombare (Netherlands) E Wacanno	4	2

Quarterfinals
(Belarus) S Pirazhenka (France) J Ponchet	7	6
(Hungary) Á Bukta (Slovakia) V Juhászová	5	1
4	(Romania) I Bara (Slovakia) C Škamlová	6	6
(Sweden) J Cabaj Awad (Norway) U Eikeri	4	4
WC	(Hungary) A Bondár (Hungary) RL Jani	6	6
3	(Spain) S Soler Espinosa (Switzerland) J Teichmann	4	4
(Romania) A Cadanțu (Czech Republic) T Smitková	6^{5}	6	[11]
WC	(Romania) AB Mihăilă (Hungary) S Szlavikovics	7^{7}	3	[9]

Semifinals
(Belarus) S Pirazhenka (France) J Ponchet	2	4
4	(Romania) I Bara (Slovakia) C Škamlová	6	6
WC	(Hungary) A Bondár (Hungary) RL Jani	3	1
(Romania) A Cadanțu (Czech Republic) T Smitková	6	6

Final
4	(Romania) I Bara (Slovakia) C Škamlová	7^{9}	6
(Romania) A Cadanțu (Czech Republic) T Smitková	6^{7}	4
