= 2023 Kuchyně Gorenje Prague Open =

Tennis tournament

- Date: 28 August–3 September 2023
- Edition: 10th
- Category: ITF Women's World Tennis Tour
- Prize money: $60,000
- Surface: Clay / Outdoor
- Location: Prague, Czech Republic

Champions

Singles
- (Romania) Andreea Mitu

Doubles
- (Poland) Martyna Kubka / (Kazakhstan) Zhibek Kulambayeva
- Kuchyně Gorenje Prague Open

The 2023 Kuchyně Gorenje Prague Open (branded as the Kuchyně Gorenje Prague Open by Moneta Money Bank for sponsorship reasons) is a professional tennis tournament playing on outdoor clay courts. It is the tenth edition of the tournament which was part of the 2023 ITF Women's World Tennis Tour. It took place in Prague, Czech Republic between 28 August and 3 September 2023.

== Champions ==
=== Singles ===
- (Romania) Andreea Mitu def. (Czech Republic) Sára Bejlek 7–6^{(7–1)}, 2–6, 6–3.

=== Doubles ===
- (Poland) Martyna Kubka / (Kazakhstan) Zhibek Kulambayeva def. (Italy) Angelica Moratelli / (Italy) Camilla Rosatello 7–6^{(7–3)}, 6–4.

== Singles main draw entrants ==
=== Seeds ===
Country	Player	Rank^{1}	Seed
HUN	Dalma Gálfi	117	1
HUN	Réka Luca Jani	170	2
~~CZE~~	~~Gabriela Knutson~~	~~205~~	~~3~~
CZE	Sára Bejlek	213	4
ROU	Irina Bara	215	5
TUR	Berfu Cengiz	239	6
GBR	Sonay Kartal	259	7
AUS	Seone Mendez	264	8
UKR	Valeriya Strakhova	280	9
GRE	Sapfo Sakellaridi	295	10
CRO	Lea Bošković	301	11
ITA	Camilla Rosatello	321	12
GER	Katharina Hobgarski	322	13
CZE	Julie Štruplová	336	14
ROU	Andreea Prisăcariu	346	15
CZE	Dominika Šalková	352	16

- ^{1} Rankings are as of 21 August 2023.

=== Other entrants ===
The following players received wildcards into the singles main draw:

- (Czech Republic) Victoria Bervid
- (Czech Republic) Tereza Krejčová
- (Czech Republic) Julie Paštiková
- (Czech Republic) Amélie Šmejkalová
- (Germany) Jana Vanik

The following players received entry from the qualifying draw:

- (Poland) Maja Chwalińska
- (France) Sarah Iliev
- (Poland) Martyna Kubka
- (Slovakia) Martina Okáľová
- (Italy) Tatiana Pieri
- (Georgia (country)) Sofia Shapatava
- (Hungary) Luca Udvardy
- (Romania) Arina Vasilescu

The following players received entry as lucky losers:

- (Slovakia) Katarína Strešnaková
