= 2022 Kuchyně Gorenje Prague Open – Doubles =

Doubles
- 2022 Kuchyně Gorenje Prague Open

Final
- Champions: (France) Elixane Lechemia (Germany) Julia Lohoff
- Runners-up: (Czech Republic) Linda Klimovičová (Czech Republic) Dominika Šalková
- Score: 7–5, 7–5

Events
Singles	Doubles
← 2021 ·	Kuchyně Gorenje Prague Open	· 2023 →

Miriam Kolodziejová and Jesika Malečková were the defending champions but both players chose to participate with different partners. Kolodziejová partnered with Anastasia Dețiuc, but lost in the first round to Sada Nahimana and Alexandra Osborne. Malečková partnered alongside Vera Lapko, but lost in the semifinals to Elixane Lechemia and Julia Lohoff.

Lechemia and Lohoff went on to win the title, defeating Linda Klimovičová and Dominika Šalková in the final, 7–5, 7–5.

== Seeds ==
1. (Venezuela) Andrea Gámiz / (Netherlands) Eva Vedder (first round)
2. (France) Elixane Lechemia / (Germany) Julia Lohoff (champions)
3. (Czech Republic) Anastasia Dețiuc / (Czech Republic) Miriam Kolodziejová (first round)
4. (Argentina) María Lourdes Carlé / (Greece) Despina Papamichail (first round)

== Draw ==
=== Key ===
- Q = Qualifier
- WC = Wild card
- LL = Lucky loser
- Alt = Alternate
- SE = Special exempt
- PR = Protected ranking
- ITF = ITF entry
- JE = Junior exempt
- w/o = Walkover
- r = Retired
- d = Defaulted
- SR = Special ranking

=== Draw ===
First round
1	(Venezuela) A Gámiz (Netherlands) E Vedder	6^{4}	7^{7}	[5]
(Czech Republic) A Laboutková (Czech Republic) J Marková	7^{7}	6^{2}	[10]
(North Macedonia) L Gjorcheska (Bosnia and Herzegovina) D Herdželaš	6	6
WC	(Czech Republic) N Břečková (Czech Republic) I Šebestová	3	2
3	(Czech Republic) A Dețiuc (Czech Republic) M Kolodziejová	3	4
(Burundi) S Nahimana (Australia) A Osborne	6	6
A Fomina-Klotz; A Komardina	2	6^{6}
WC	(Czech Republic) L Klimovičová (Czech Republic) D Šalková	6	7^{8}
WC	(Czech Republic) T Valentová (Czech Republic) K Vlčková	3	6	[7]
(Greece) S Sakellaridi (United States) C Scholl	6	4	[10]
V Lapko (Czech Republic) J Malečková	6	6
4	(Argentina) ML Carlé (Greece) D Papamichail	4	4
(Japan) F Kozaki (Japan) M Matsuda	6	6^{1}	[10]
(Australia) A Bozovic (Netherlands) I Haverlag	1	7^{7}	[8]
(Sweden) C Hennemann (Bolivia) N Zeballos	3	1
2	(France) E Lechemia (Germany) J Lohoff	6	6

Quarterfinals
(Czech Republic) A Laboutková (Czech Republic) J Marková	1	1
(North Macedonia) L Gjorcheska (Bosnia and Herzegovina) D Herdželaš	6	6
(Burundi) S Nahimana (Australia) A Osborne
WC	(Czech Republic) L Klimovičová (Czech Republic) D Šalková	w/o
(Greece) S Sakellaridi (United States) C Scholl	4	6^{4}
V Lapko (Czech Republic) J Malečková	6	7^{7}
(Japan) F Kozaki (Japan) M Matsuda	4	3
2	(France) E Lechemia (Germany) J Lohoff	6	6

Semifinals
(North Macedonia) L Gjorcheska (Bosnia and Herzegovina) D Herdželaš	6	3	[3]
WC	(Czech Republic) L Klimovičová (Czech Republic) D Šalková	4	6	[10]
V Lapko (Czech Republic) J Malečková	3	7^{7}	[8]
2	(France) E Lechemia (Germany) J Lohoff	6	6^{2}	[10]

Final
WC	(Czech Republic) L Klimovičová (Czech Republic) D Šalková	5	5
2	(France) E Lechemia (Germany) J Lohoff	7	7
