= 2023 Kuchyně Gorenje Prague Open – Doubles =

Doubles
- 2023 Kuchyně Gorenje Prague Open

Final
- Champions: (Poland) Martyna Kubka (Kazakhstan) Zhibek Kulambayeva
- Runners-up: (Italy) Angelica Moratelli (Italy) Camilla Rosatello
- Score: 7–6^{(7–3)}, 6–4

Events
Singles	Doubles
← 2022 ·	Kuchyně Gorenje Prague Open	· 2024 →

Elixane Lechemia and Julia Lohoff is the defending champions but both Lohoff chose to participate at the TCCB Open in Switzerland, Lechemia chose not to participate.

Martyna Kubka and Zhibek Kulambayeva won the title, defeating Angelica Moratelli and Camilla Rosatello in the final, 7–6^{(7–3)}, 6–4.

== Seeds ==
1. (Italy) Angelica Moratelli / (Italy) Camilla Rosatello (finals)
2. (Czech Republic) Dominika Šalková / (Czech Republic) Renata Voráčová (first round)
3. (Romania) Oana Gavrilă / (Greece) Sapfo Sakellaridi (semifinals)
4. (Romania) Irina Bara / (Georgia (country)) Ekaterine Gorgodze (semifinals)

== Draw ==
Key

- Q = Qualifier
- WC = Wild card
- LL = Lucky loser
- Alt = Alternate
- ITF = ITF entry
- PR = Protected ranking
- SR = Special ranking
- SE = Special exempt
- JE = Junior exempt
- JR = Junior Accelerator Programme entrant
- CO = College Accelerator Programme entrant
- NG = Next Gen Accelerator Program entrant
- w/o = Walkover
- r = Retired
- d = Defaulted

=== Draw ===
First round
1	(Italy) A Moratelli (Italy) C Rosatello	4	6	[10]
(Czech Republic) A Kučmová (Czech Republic) I Šebestová	6	2	[4]
(Czech Republic) D Hindová (Czech Republic) K Kubáňová	1	6	[10]
(Slovenia) P Lovrič (Hungary) A Nagy	6	3	[7]
3	(Romania) O Gavrilă (Greece) S Sakellaridi	6	2	[10]
Alt	(Ukraine) M Kolb (Ukraine) N Kolb	3	6	[8]
(Japan) R Saigo (Japan) Y Saigo	6	6
(Slovakia) K Kužmová (Hungary) AK Tóth	4	2
(Georgia (country)) S Shapatava (United Kingdom) E Webley-Smith	2	7	[11]
WC	(Czech Republic) T Krejčová (Czech Republic) J Paštiková	6	5	[9]
WC	(Czech Republic) M Smékalová (Czech Republic) J Štruplová	4	4
4	(Romania) I Bara (Georgia (country)) E Gorgodze	6	6
(Romania) A Prisăcariu (United States) C Scholl	5	2
(Romania) A Mitu (Ukraine) V Strakhova	7	6
(Poland) M Kubka (Kazakhstan) Z Kulambayeva	6	7^{7}
2	(Czech Republic) D Šalková (Czech Republic) R Voráčová	0	6^{3}

Quarterfinals
1	(Italy) A Moratelli (Italy) C Rosatello	3	6	[10]
(Czech Republic) D Hindová (Czech Republic) K Kubáňová	6	3	[8]
3	(Romania) O Gavrilă (Greece) S Sakellaridi	6	6
(Japan) R Saigo (Japan) Y Saigo	2	3
(Georgia (country)) S Shapatava (United Kingdom) E Webley-Smith	5	2
4	(Romania) I Bara (Georgia (country)) E Gorgodze	7	6
(Romania) A Mitu (Ukraine) V Strakhova	6	5	[8]
(Poland) M Kubka (Kazakhstan) Z Kulambayeva	4	7	[10]

Semifinals
1	(Italy) A Moratelli (Italy) C Rosatello	6	6
3	(Romania) O Gavrilă (Greece) S Sakellaridi	1	2
4	(Romania) I Bara (Georgia (country)) E Gorgodze	2	1
(Poland) M Kubka (Kazakhstan) Z Kulambayeva	6	6

Final
1	(Italy) A Moratelli (Italy) C Rosatello	6^{3}	4
(Poland) M Kubka (Kazakhstan) Z Kulambayeva	7^{7}	6
