= Ladies Open Dunakeszi =

ITF Women's Tour
- Event name: Dunakeszi
- Location: Dunakeszi, Hungary
- Venue: Dunakeszi Tenisz Klub
- Category: ITF Women's Circuit
- Surface: Clay
- Draw: 32S/32Q/16D
- Prize money: $60,000
- Website: hungarianprocircuit.com

The Ladies Open Dunakeszi was a tournament for professional female tennis players played on outdoor clay courts. The event was classified as a $60,000 ITF Women's Circuit tournament and was held in Dunakeszi, Hungary, only in 2017.

== Past finals ==
=== Singles ===
Year	Champion	Runner-up	Score
2017	(Ukraine) Dayana Yastremska	(Ukraine) Katarina Zavatska	6–0, 6–1

=== Doubles ===
Year	Champions	Runners-up	Score
2017	(Romania) Irina Bara (Slovakia) Chantal Škamlová	(Romania) Alexandra Cadanțu (Czech Republic) Tereza Smitková	7–6^{(9–7)}, 6–4
