= Kuchyně Gorenje Prague Open =

- 2023 Kuchyně Gorenje Prague Open

ITF Women's Tour
- Event name: Kuchyně Gorenje Prague Open
- Location: Prague, Czech Republic
- Venue: TK Spoje Praha
- Category: ITF Women's World Tennis Tour
- Surface: Clay / Outdoor
- Draw: 48S/32Q/16D
- Prize money: $60,000
- Website: www.smartdeal-tenis.cz

The Kuchyně Gorenje Prague Open is a tournament for professional female tennis players played on outdoor clay courts. The event is classified as a $60,000 ITF Women's World Tennis Tour tournament and has been held in Prague, Czech Republic, since 2014. In 2021, it was upgraded from a $25k to a $60k event.

== Past finals ==
=== Singles ===
Year	Champion	Runner-up	Score
2023	(Romania) Andreea Mitu	(Czech Republic) Sára Bejlek	7–6^{(7–1)}, 2–6, 6–3
2022	(Hungary) Réka Luca Jani	(Germany) Noma Noha Akugue	6–3, 7–6^{(7–4)}
2021	(Poland) Magdalena Fręch	(Czech Republic) Tereza Smitková	6–2, 6–1
2020	(Slovakia) Jana Čepelová	(Mexico) Renata Zarazúa	6–4, 7–6^{(7–4)}
2019	(Czech Republic) Jesika Malečková	(Netherlands) Cindy Burger	6–1, 6–2
2018	(Germany) Julyette Steur	(Czech Republic) Magdaléna Pantůčková	7–6^{(7–5)}, 7–6^{(7–3)}
2017	(France) Alice Ramé	(Belgium) Magali Kempen	6–4, 5–4 ret.
2016	(Czech Republic) Petra Krejsová	(Czech Republic) Miriam Kolodziejová	7–5, 7–6^{(7–4)}
2015	(Switzerland) Patty Schnyder	(Slovakia) Zuzana Luknárová	6–1, 6–2
2014	(Czech Republic) Jesika Malečková	(Czech Republic) Zuzana Zálabská	6–3, 7–6^{(8–6)}

=== Doubles ===
Year	Champions	Runners-up	Score
2023	(Poland) Martyna Kubka (Kazakhstan) Zhibek Kulambayeva	(Italy) Angelica Moratelli (Italy) Camilla Rosatello	7–6^{(7–3)}, 6–4
2022	(France) Elixane Lechemia (Germany) Julia Lohoff	(Czech Republic) Linda Klimovičová (Czech Republic) Dominika Šalková	7–5, 7–5
2021	(Czech Republic) Miriam Kolodziejová (Czech Republic) Jesika Malečková	(Japan) Kanako Morisaki (Japan) Erika Sema	6–3, 1–6, [10–2]
2020	(Czech Republic) Anastasia Dețiuc (Czech Republic) Johana Marková	(United States) Sofia Sewing (United States) Katie Volynets	6–2, 6–1
2019	(Czech Republic) Anastasia Dețiuc (Czech Republic) Johana Marková	(Russia) Ekaterina Kazionova (Russia) Anastasiya Komardina	6–1, 6–3
2018	(Czech Republic) Karolína Kubáňová (Czech Republic) Nikola Tomanová	(Canada) Petra Januskova (Germany) Julyette Steur	4–6, 6–3, [10–7]
2017	(Czech Republic) Kristýna Hrabalová (Czech Republic) Nikola Tomanová	(Moldova) Anastasia Dețiuc (Czech Republic) Johana Marková	6–1, 6–3
2016	(Romania) Laura Ioana Andrei (Germany) Sarah-Rebecca Sekulic	(Czech Republic) Miriam Kolodziejová (Czech Republic) Vendula Žovincová	6–4, 6–2
2015	(Slovakia) Zuzana Luknárová (Brazil) Laura Pigossi	(Slovakia) Jana Jablonovská (Czech Republic) Vendula Žovincová	6–3, 6–7^{(4–7)}, [10–6]
2014	(Czech Republic) Petra Krejsová (Slovakia) Zuzana Luknárová	(Czech Republic) Lenka Kunčíková (Czech Republic) Karolína Stuchlá	4–6, 6–3, [10–6]
