= Alexandra Cadanțu-Ignatik =

Romanian tennis player

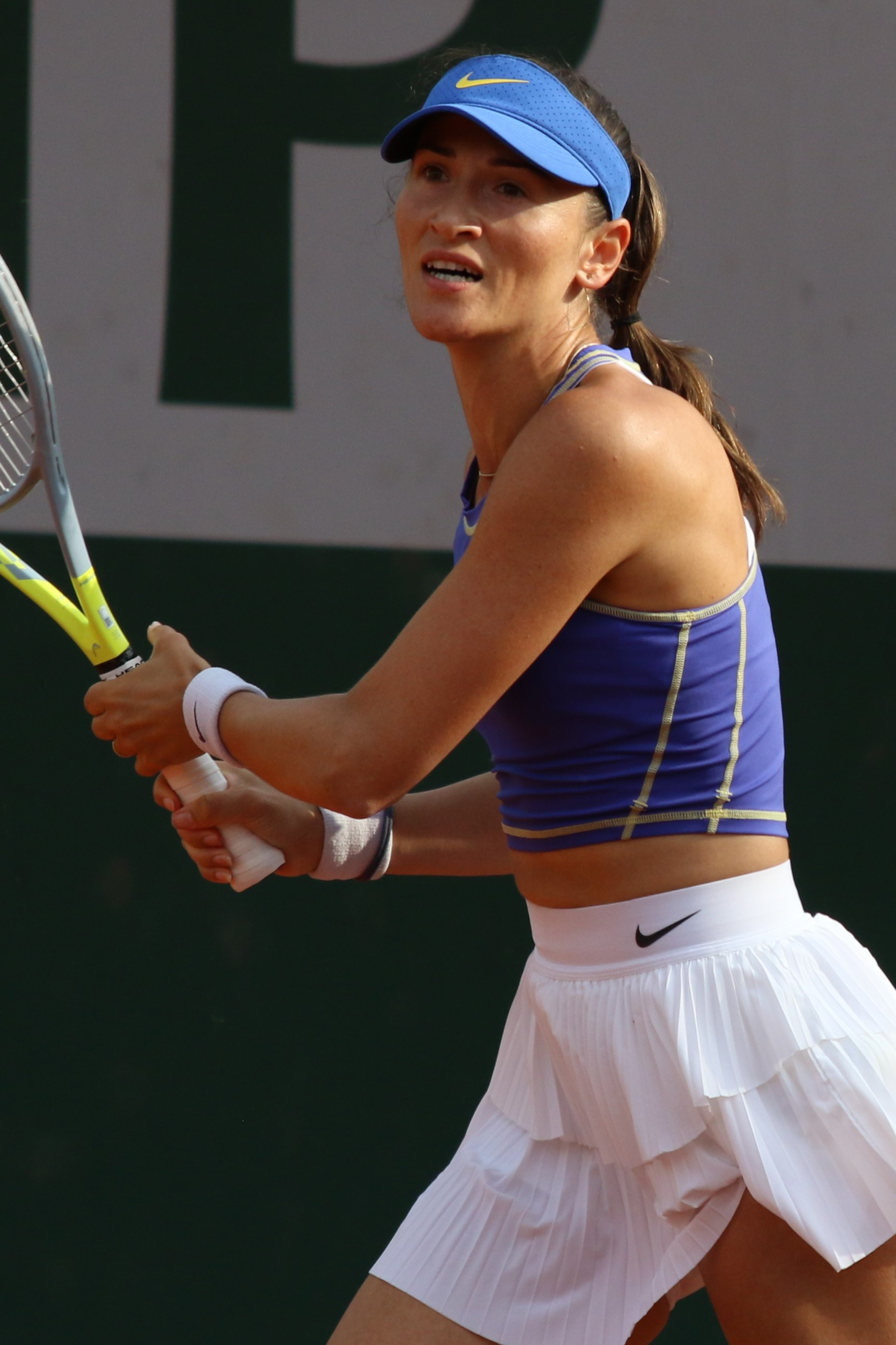
- Cadanțu-Ignatik at the 2023 French Open
- Country (sports): Romania
- Born: 3 May 1990 (age 36) Bucharest
- Height: 1.70 m (5 ft 7 in)
- Turned pro: 2005
- Retired: 2024
- Plays: Right-handed (two-handed backhand)
- Prize money: US$ 1,183,841

Singles
- Career record: 503–377
- Career titles: 11 ITF
- Highest ranking: No. 59 (6 January 2014)

Grand Slam singles results
- Australian Open: 1R (2012, 2013, 2014)
- French Open: 1R (2012, 2013, 2014)
- Wimbledon: 2R (2013)
- US Open: 1R (2012, 2013)

Doubles
- Career record: 194–181
- Career titles: 1 WTA, 12 ITF
- Highest ranking: No. 101 (11 June 2012)

Grand Slam doubles results
- Australian Open: 1R (2014)
- French Open: 1R (2012)
- Wimbledon: 1R (2012)
- US Open: 1R (2012, 2013)

Alexandra Cadanțu-Ignatik (née Cadanțu; born 3 May 1990) is a Romanian former professional tennis player.

On 6 January 2014, she reached her career-high singles ranking of world No. 59. Her best doubles ranking by the WTA is No. 101, achieved on 11 June 2012.

At Grand Slam tournaments, Cadanțu-Ignatik won only one (main-draw) match, at the 2013 Wimbledon Championships. Usually, she was playing on the ITF Circuit.

In July 2021, Alexandra changed her name to Cadanțu-Ignatik, after marrying fellow tennis player Uladzimir Ignatik.

== Career ==
Born in Bucharest, Cadanțu began playing tennis at age three. Her favourite surface was clay.

=== 2013 ===
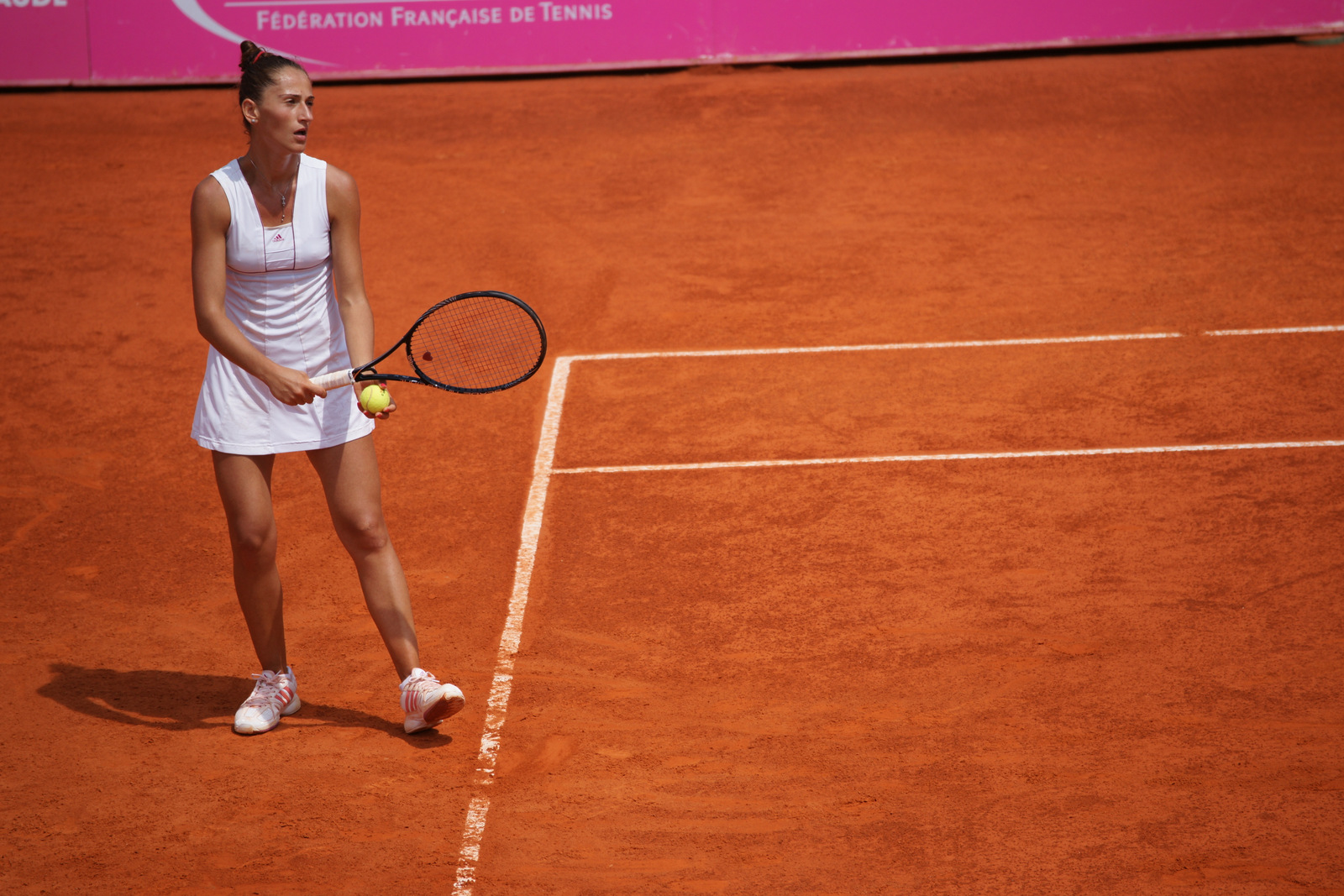
Cadanțu at the 2013 Open de Cagnes-sur-Mer

Cadanțu started the year in Shenzhen but was defeated by Bojana Jovanovski in the first round. Her next tournament was in Sydney, where she was defeated in the first qualifying round by Olga Puchkova. Alexandra then lost to Heather Watson in the Australian Open first round.

In February, she won her first match for the season in Cali, Colombia – defeating Laura Pous Tió. Then she lost in the second round to Sesil Karatantcheva in three sets, reached quarterfinals in Bogotá, Colombia, defeating Maria Joao Koehler in the first and Tereza Mrdeža in the second round. She then fell in the quarterfinals to Jelena Janković. Then, in Acapulco, Mexico, Cadanțu was defeated by Sara Errani in the first round. In March, she fell in Miami first qualifying round to Stefanie Vögele. She then lost to Madison Keys in the first round of Charleston.

She reached the semifinals in Katowice, Poland, in April, where she lost to Petra Kvitová. On her road, she defeated Yuliya Beygelzimer, Katarzyna Kawa, Raluca Olaru, Sabine Lisicki, each of them in straight sets, and Irina-Camelia Begu, and Shahar Pe'er in three. She has also reached the semifinals at the Budapest Grand Prix, where she lost in straight sets to compatriot Simona Halep and eventual winner of the tournament.

=== 2014 ===
Cadanțu started the year in Auckland where she had to retire in her first round, 1–6, 0–4 down against Kurumi Nara. She also fell at the first round in Hobart (losing to Olivia Rogowska), at the Australian Open (to Flavia Pennetta), and in Rio (to Teliana Pereira).

Then things started to improve with a quarterfinal at Florianópolis, beating wildcard Gabriela Cé in the first round and Dinah Pfizenmaier in the second before losing to Yaroslava Shvedova, in straight sets. Cadanțu fell in the first round at Indian Wells and Miami, losing to rising stars CoCo Vandeweghe and Zarina Diyas, respectively. In Katowice, she beat Yanina Wickmayer before losing a tight three-set match to third seed Carla Suárez Navarro. She then had a nine-match losing streak, including the French Open and Wimbledon, which she snapped at the $100k Contrexéville. She won the doubles title at Bucharest alongside compatriot Ana Bogdan; they beat Çağla Büyükakçay and Karin Knapp in the final. Later in the year, she reached quarterfinals of the ITF events at Saint-Malo, Monterrey and Victoria.

=== 2024: Retirement ===
Cadanțu-Ignatik announced her retirement from professional tennis in June 2024.

== Performance timelines ==
Key
W	F	SF	QF	#R	RR	Q#	DNQ	A	NH

(W) winner; (F) finalist; (SF) semifinalist; (QF) quarterfinalist; (#R) rounds 4, 3, 2, 1; (RR) round-robin stage; (Q#) qualification round; (DNQ) did not qualify; (A) absent; (NH) not held; (SR) strike rate (events won / competed); (W–L) win–loss record.
To avoid confusion and double counting, these charts are updated at the conclusion of a tournament or when the player's participation has ended.

Only main-draw results in WTA Tour, Grand Slam tournaments, Fed Cup/Billie Jean King Cup and Olympic Games are included in win–loss records.

=== Singles ===
Tournament	2011	2012	2013	2014	...	2017	2018	2019	2020	2021	2022	2023	SR	W–L
Grand Slam tournaments
Australian Open	A	1R	1R	1R		A	Q1	A	A	A	Q2	Q2	0 / 3	0–3
French Open	Q2	1R	1R	1R		A	Q1	A	A	A	Q1	Q1	0 / 3	0–3
Wimbledon	Q1	1R	2R	1R		A	Q1	Q1	NH	A	Q2	A	0 / 3	1–3
US Open	Q1	1R	1R	A		Q1	A	Q1	A	A	Q2	A	0 / 2	0–2
Win–loss	0–0	0–4	1–4	0–3		0–0	0–0	0–0	0–0	0–0	0–0	0–0	0 / 11	1–11
WTA 1000
Dubai / Qatar Open (Note: The first Premier 5 event of the year has switched back and forth between the Dubai Tennis Championships and the Qatar Ladies Open since 2009. Dubai was classified as a Premier 5 event from 2009 to 2011 before being succeeded by Doha for the 2012–2014 period. In 2015, Dubai regained its Premier 5 status while Doha was demoted to Premier status. The Premier 5 tournaments were reclassified as WTA 1000 tournaments in 2021.)	A	A	A	A		A	A	A	A	A	A	A	0 / 0	0–0
Indian Wells Open	A	A	A	1R		A	A	A	NH	A	A	A	0 / 1	0–1
Miami Open	A	A	Q1	1R		A	A	A	NH	A	A	A	0 / 1	0–1
Madrid Open	A	A	A	Q1		A	A	A	NH	A	A	A	0 / 0	0–0
Italian Open	A	A	A	A		A	A	A	A	A	A	A	0 / 0	0–0
Canadian Open	A	A	A	A		A	A	A	NH	A	A	A	0 / 0	0–0
Cincinnati Open	A	A	A	A		A	A	A	A	A	A	A	0 / 0	0–0
Pan Pacific / Wuhan Open (Note: In 2014, the Pan Pacific Open was downgraded to a Premier event and replaced by the Wuhan Open. The Premier 5 tournaments were reclassified as WTA 1000 tournaments in 2021.)	A	Q1	A	A		A	A	A	NH			A	0 / 0	0–0
China Open	A	A	A	A		A	A	A	NH			A	0 / 0	0–0
Guadalajara Open	NH										A	A	0 / 0	0–0
Career statistics
Tournaments	1	18	18	17		2	1	1	0	1	2	0	Career total: 61	
Titles	0	0	0	0		0	0	0	0	0	0	0	Career total: 0	
Finals	0	1	0	0		0	0	0	0	0	0	0	Career total: 1	
Overall win-loss	1–1	10–18	16–18	3–17		1–2	0–1	0–1	0–0	0–1	1–2	0–0	0 / 61	32–61
Year-end ranking	96	90	62	235		149	269	270	261	203	171	292	$1,183,841	

=== Doubles ===
Tournament	2012	2013	2014	W–L
Australian Open	A	A	1R	0–1
French Open	1R	A	A	0–1
Wimbledon	1R	A	A	0–1
US Open	1R	1R	A	0–2
Win–Loss	0–3	0–1	0–1	0–5

== WTA Tour finals ==
=== Singles: 1 (runner-up) ===
Legend WTA 250 (0–1)	Finals by surface Hard (0–1)

Result	Date	Tournament	Tier	Surface	Opponent	Score
Loss	Feb 2012	Monterrey Open, Mexico	International (Note: The WTA International tournaments were reclassified as WTA 250 tournaments in 2021.)	Hard	(Hungary) Tímea Babos	4–6, 4–6

=== Doubles: 3 (1 title, 2 runner-ups) ===
Legend WTA 250 (1–2)	Finals by surface Clay (1–2)

Result	W–L	Date	Tournament	Tier	Surface	Partner	Opponents	Score
Loss	0–1	Apr 2012	Rabat Grand Prix, Morocco	International	Clay	(Romania) Irina-Camelia Begu	(Czech Republic) Petra Cetkovská (Russia) Alexandra Panova	6–3, 6–7^{(5–7)}, [9–11]
Win	1–1	Jul 2014	Bucharest Open, Romania	International	Clay	(Romania) Elena Bogdan	(Turkey) Çağla Büyükakçay (Italy) Karin Knapp	6–4, 3–6, [10–5]
Loss	1–2	Jul 2016	Bucharest Open, Romania	International	Clay	(Poland) Katarzyna Piter	(Australia) Jessica Moore (Thailand) Varatchaya Wongteanchai	3–6, 6–7^{(5–7)}

== WTA 125 finals ==
=== Singles: 1 (runner-up) ===
Result	Date	Tournament	Surface	Opponent	Score
Loss	Jun 2017	Bol Open, Croatia	Clay	(Serbia) Aleksandra Krunić	3–6, 0–3 ret.

== ITF Circuit finals ==
=== Singles: 34 (11 titles, 23 runner-ups) ===
Legend
$100,000 tournaments
$50/60,000 tournaments
$25,000 tournaments
$10/15,000 tournaments

Result	W–L	Date	Tournament	Tier	Surface	Opponent	Score
Win	1–0	Sep 2006	ITF Bucharest, Romania	10,000	Clay	(Romania) Irina-Camelia Begu	6–3, 1–6, 6–3
Win	2–0	Jul 2007	ITF Bucharest, Romania	10,000	Clay	(Romania) Ioana Gașpar	6–2, 6–3
Loss	2–1	Aug 2007	ITF Constanţa, Romania	10,000	Clay	(Romania) Corina Corduneanu	6–7^{(5)}, 6–3, 1–6
Loss	2–2	Sep 2007	ITF Hunedoara, Romania	10,000	Clay	(Romania) Elora Dabija	6–7^{(4)}, 6–4, 2–6
Loss	2–3	Mar 2008	ITF Cairo, Egypt	10,000	Clay	(Russia) Elena Chalova	2–6, 3–6
Loss	2–4	Aug 2008	ITF Arad, Romania	10,000	Clay	(Hungary) Palma Kiraly	3–6, 2–6
Loss	2–5	Mar 2010	ITF Madrid, Spain	10,000	Clay	(Italy) Elisa Balsamo	1–6, 4–6
Win	3–5	May 2010	ITF Bucharest, Romania	10,000	Clay	(Romania) Diana Enache	6–2, 6–4
Win	4–5	May 2010	ITF Craiova, Romania	10,000	Clay	(Romania) Mădălina Gojnea	5–7, 6–3, 6–0
Loss	4–6	Sep 2010	ITF Balş, Romania	10,000	Clay	(Romania) Mihaela Buzărnescu	3–6, 2–6
Win	5–6	Oct 2010	ITF Ain Sukhna, Egypt	10,000	Clay	(Slovakia) Zuzana Zlochová	6–2, 6–3
Win	6–6	Nov 2010	ITF Niterói, Brazil	25,000	Clay	(United States) Julia Cohen	6–1, 1–6, 6–1
Loss	6–7	Nov 2010	ITF Barueri, Brazil	10,000	Hard	(Switzerland) Conny Perrin	0–5 ret.
Win	7–7	Dec 2010	ITF Rio de Janeiro, Brazil	25,000	Clay	(United States) Julia Cohen	6–1, 6–3
Loss	7–8	Jan 2011	ITF Plantation, United States	25,000	Clay	(Canada) Sharon Fichman	3–6, 6–7^{(2)}
Loss	7–9	May 2011	Grado Tennis Cup, Italy	25,000	Clay	(Croatia) Ajla Tomljanović	2–6, 4–6
Loss	7–10	Jun 2011	ITF Kristinehamn, Sweden	25,000	Clay	(Slovakia) Jana Čepelová	4–6, 6–3, 4–6
Win	8–10	Sep 2011	ITF Biella, Italy	100,000	Clay	(Colombia) Mariana Duque	6–4, 6–3
Loss	8–11	Oct 2011	Telavi Open, Georgia	50,000	Clay	(Russia) Alexandra Panova	6–4, 1–6, 1–6
Loss	8–12	Jul 2012	ITS Cup, Czech Republic	100,000	Clay	(Spain) María Teresa Torró Flor	2–6, 3–6
Loss	8–13	May 2013	Prague Open, Czech Republic	100,000	Clay	(Czech Republic) Lucie Šafářová	6–3, 1–6, 1–6
Loss	8–14	Apr 2015	Chiasso Open, Switzerland	25,000	Clay	(Hungary) Réka Luca Jani	6–3, 3–6, 6–7^{(6)}
Win	9–14	Jun 2015	ITF Galați, Romania	25,000	Clay	(Romania) Cristina Dinu	6–4, 6–7^{(2)}, 6–3
Loss	9–15	Sep 2015	ITF Bucha, Ukraine	25,000	Clay	(Slovakia) Kristína Kučová	6–4, 6–7^{(5)}, 0–6
Loss	9–16	Aug 2018	ITF Bad Saulgau, Germany	25,000	Clay	(Germany) Laura Siegemund	4–6, 2–6
Loss	9–17	Apr 2019	ITF Pula, Italy	25,000	Clay	(Slovenia) Kaja Juvan	1–6, 0–3 ret.
Win	10–17	Oct 2020	ITF Heraklion, Greece	15,000	Clay	(Romania) Andreea Roșca	4–6, 6–3, 6–3
Loss	10–18	Nov 2020	ITF Heraklion, Greece	15,000	Clay	(Germany) Romy Kölzer	3–6, 6–1, 2–6
Loss	10–19	Aug 2021	Přerov Cup, Czech Republic	60,000	Clay	(Czech Republic) Linda Nosková	7–6^{(2)}, 4–6, 3–6
Loss	10–20	Jan 2022	ITF Sharm El Sheikh, Egypt	25,000	Hard	(Italy) Lucrezia Stefanini	2–6, 0–3 ret.
Win	11–20	Feb 2022	ITF Sharm El Sheikh, Egypt	25,000	Hard	(Russia) Marina Melnikova	0–6, 6–3, 6–3
Loss	11–21	Apr 2022	ITF Orlando Pro, United States	25,000	Clay	(Sweden) Mirjam Björklund	3–6, 4–6
Loss	11–22	Jun 2023	ITF Pörtschach, Austria	25,000	Clay	(Poland) Weronika Falkowska	6–4, 1–6, 1–6
Loss	11–23	Aug 2023	Internazionali di Cordenons, Italy	60,000	Clay	(Slovenia) Veronika Erjavec	3–6, 4–6

=== Doubles: 24 (12 titles, 12 runner-ups) ===
Legend
$100,000 tournaments
$50/60,000 tournaments
$25,000 tournaments
$10,000 tournaments

Result	W–L	Date	Tournament	Tier	Surface	Partner	Opponents	Score
Loss	0–1	May 2008	ITF Galaţi, Romania	10,000	Clay	(Romania) Antonia Xenia Tout	(Slovakia) Kristína Kučová (Italy) Valentina Sulpizio	0–6, 2–6
Loss	0–2	May 2009	Wiesbaden Open, Germany	10,000	Clay	(Romania) Alexandra Stuparu	(Netherlands) Leonie Mekel (Netherlands) Pauline Wong	1–6, 3–6
Loss	0–3	Dec 2009	ITF Benicarló, Spain	10,000	Clay	(Romania) Diana Enache	(Italy) Romina Oprandi (Spain) Laura Pous Tió	4–6, 3–6
Win	1–3	Apr 2010	Bol Open, Croatia	10,000	Clay	(Romania) Alexandra Damaschin	(Slovakia) Chantal Škamlová (Slovakia) Romana Tabaková	6–2, 1–6, [10–5]
Win	2–3	Apr 2010	ITF Šibenik, Croatia	10,000	Clay	(Bulgaria) Dalia Zafirova	(Croatia) Maria Abramović (Romania) Mădălina Gojnea	6–2, 6–3
Win	3–3	May 2010	ITF Craiova, Romania	10,000	Clay	(Romania) Alexandra Damaschin	(Bulgaria) Tanya Germanlieva (Bulgaria) Dessislava Mladenova	6–3, 6–3
Win	4–3	Sep 2010	ITF Balş, Romania	10,000	Clay	(Romania) Alexandra Damaschin	(Bulgaria) Martina Gledacheva (Italy) Valentina Sulpizio	6–3, 7–5
Win	5–3	Jun 2011	ITF Ystad, Sweden	25,000	Clay	(Romania) Diana Enache	(Bosnia and Herzegovina) Mervana Jugić-Salkić (Finland) Emma Laine	6–4, 2–6, [10–5]
Win	6–3	Sep 2011	ITF Mamaia, Romania	25,000	Clay	(Romania) Elena Bogdan	(Russia) Marina Shamayko (Georgia (country)) Sofia Shapatava	6–2, 6–2
Loss	6–4	Sep 2011	Sofia Cup, Bulgaria	100,000	Clay	(Romania) Raluca Olaru	(Russia) Nina Bratchikova (Croatia) Darija Jurak	4–6, 5–7
Loss	6–5	Feb 2012	Copa Bionaire, Colombia	100,000	Clay	(Romania) Raluca Olaru	(Italy) Karin Knapp (Luxembourg) Mandy Minella	4–6, 3–6
Win	7–5	Sep 2014	Royal Cup, Montenegro	25,000	Clay	(Liechtenstein) Stephanie Vogt	(Switzerland) Xenia Knoll (Netherlands) Arantxa Rus	6–1, 3–6, [10–2]
Win	8–5	Oct 2015	Open de Touraine, France	50,000	Hard (i)	(Romania) Cristina Dinu	(Switzerland) Viktorija Golubic (Italy) Alice Matteucci	7–5, 6–3
Win	9–5	Nov 2015	ITF Équeurdreville, France	25,000	Hard (i)	(Netherlands) Lesley Kerkhove	(Ukraine) Elizaveta Ianchuk (France) Sherazad Reix	6–3, 6–4
Loss	9–6	Sep 2016	Open de Saint-Malo, France	50,000	Clay	(Romania) Jaqueline Cristian	(North Macedonia) Lina Gjorcheska (Latvia) Diāna Marcinkēviča	6–3, 3–6, [8–10]
Loss	9–7	Oct 2016	Open de Touraine, France	50,000	Hard (i)	(Russia) Ekaterina Yashina	(Serbia) Ivana Jorović (Netherlands) Lesley Kerkhove	3–6, 5–7
Loss	9–8	Oct 2016	ITF Poitiers, France	100,000	Hard (i)	(Germany) Nicola Geuer	(Japan) Nao Hibino (Poland) Alicja Rosolska	0–6, 0–6
Loss	9–9	Feb 2017	Open de Grenoble, France	25,000	Hard (i)	(Sweden) Cornelia Lister	(Belarus) Ilona Kremen (Czech Republic) Tereza Smitková	1–6, 5–7
Win	10–9	Feb 2017	AK Ladies Open, Germany	25,000	Carpet (i)	(Sweden) Cornelia Lister	(United Kingdom) Tara Moore (Switzerland) Conny Perrin	6–2, 3–6, [11–9]
Loss	10–10	Sep 2017	Ladies Open Dunakeszi, Hungary	60,000	Clay	(Czech Republic) Tereza Smitková	(Romania) Irina Bara (Slovakia) Chantal Škamlová	6–7^{(7)}, 4–6
Win	11–10	Jul 2018	Budapest Pro Open, Hungary	100,000	Clay	(Slovakia) Chantal Škamlová	(United States) Kaitlyn Christian (Mexico) Giuliana Olmos	6–1, 6–3
Loss	11–11	Sep 2018	Zagreb Ladies Open, Croatia	60,000	Clay	(Romania) Elena Bogdan	(Venezuela) Andrea Gámiz (Venezuela) Aymet Uzcategui	3–6, 4–6
Loss	11–12	Sep 2018	Open de Saint-Malo, France	60,000	Clay	(Latvia) Diāna Marcinkēviča	(Spain) Cristina Bucșa (Colombia) María Herazo González	6–4, 1–6, [8–10]
Win	12–12	Sep 2020	ITF Tarvisio, Italy	25,000	Clay	(Belgium) Marie Benoît	(Hungary) Anna Bondár (Argentina) Paula Ormaechea	6–1, 6–3
