= Tereza Smitková =

Czech tennis player (born 1994)

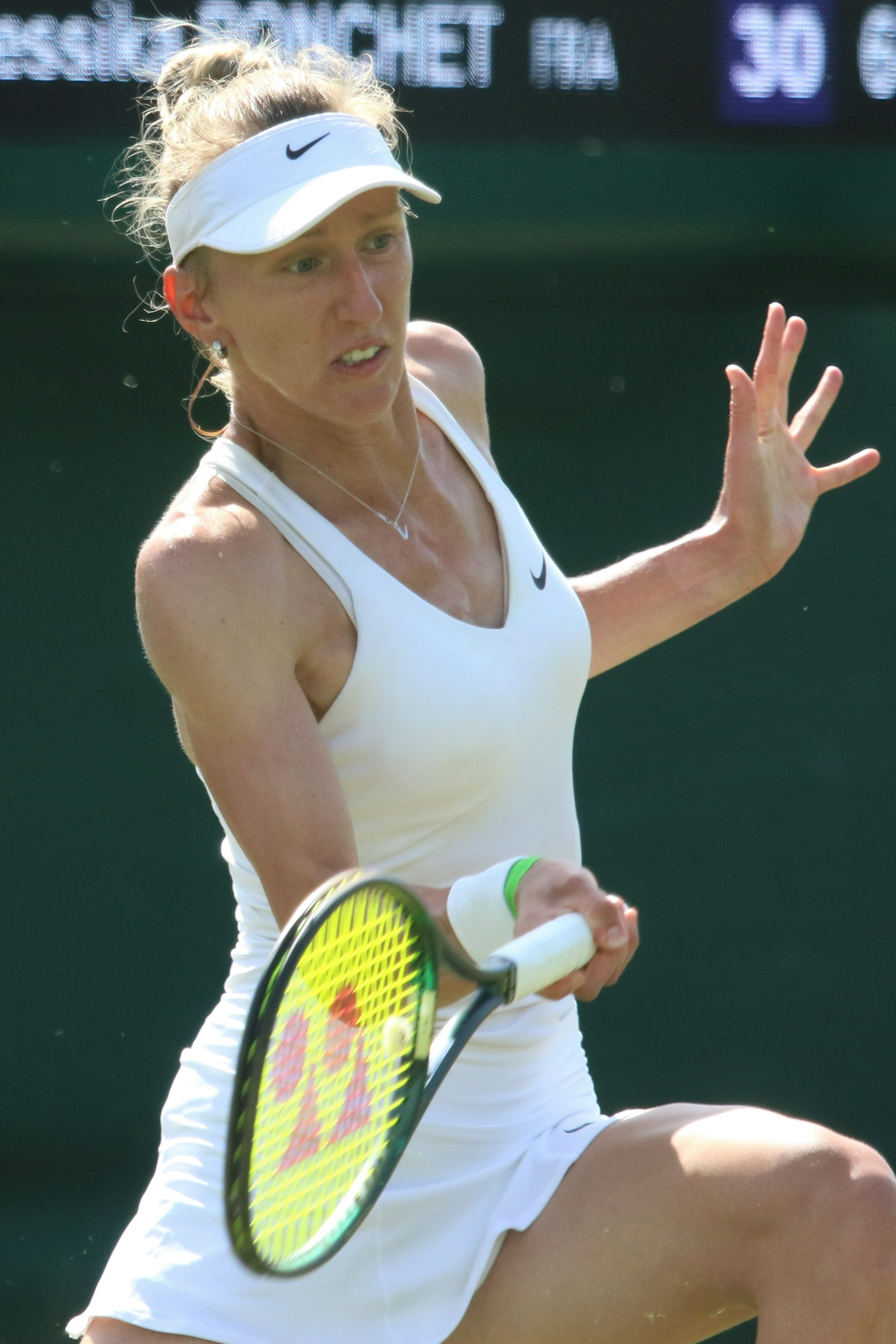
- Smitková at the 2022 Wimbledon Championships
- Country (sports): Czech Republic
- Residence: Hradec Králové, Czech Republic
- Born: 10 October 1994 (age 32) Hradec Králové, Czech Republic
- Height: 1.76 m (5 ft 9 in)
- Prize money: $1,087,469

Singles
- Career record: 341–245
- Career titles: 1 WTA 125, 8 ITF
- Highest ranking: No. 57 (6 April 2015)

Grand Slam singles results
- Australian Open: 2R (2015)
- French Open: 2R (2015)
- Wimbledon: 4R (2014)
- US Open: 2R (2015)

Doubles
- Career record: 98–78
- Career titles: 7 ITF
- Highest ranking: No. 184 (19 May 2014)

Grand Slam doubles results
- French Open: 1R (2015)
- Wimbledon: 1R (2015)
- US Open: 1R (2014)

Team competitions
- Fed Cup: 1–0

Tereza Smitková (born 10 October 1994) is a Czech inactive tennis player.

Smitková has won one singles WTA 125 title as well as eight singles titles and seven doubles titles on the ITF Circuit. On 6 April 2015, she reached her best singles ranking of world No. 57. On 19 May 2014, she peaked at No. 184 in the WTA doubles rankings.

In June 2013, Smitková made her WTA Tour main-draw debut at the Nürnberger Versicherungscup. After coming through all three qualifying rounds, she lost to Julia Cohen in round one. A year later, she reached the third round of qualifying at the 2014 French Open, defeating 17th seed Victoria Duval in the first round and former top-20 player Anabel Medina Garrigues in the second. She lost in the third round of qualifying to fifth seed Danka Kovinić.

In the Wimbledon qualifying in June 2014, Smitková again reached the third round, this time defeating Madison Brengle in three sets to seal her maiden Grand Slam main-draw appearance. In the main draw, she defeated Hsieh Su-wei in the first round before upsetting grass-court specialist CoCo Vandeweghe, who was ranked world No. 51 and had won the Rosmalen Open the week before, in round two. In the third round, she defeated Bojana Jovanovski, in a match where Jovanovski served for the match twice and had held a match point on Smitková's serve. Her run was over in round four, after losing to fellow Czech Lucie Šafářová in straight sets.

== Performance timelines ==
Key
W	F	SF	QF	#R	RR	Q#	P#	DNQ	A	Z#	PO	G	S	B	NMS	NTI	P	NH

(W) winner; (F) finalist; (SF) semifinalist; (QF) quarterfinalist; (#R) rounds 4, 3, 2, 1; (RR) round-robin stage; (Q#) qualification round; (P#) preliminary round; (DNQ) did not qualify; (A) absent; (Z#) Davis/Fed Cup Zonal Group (with number indication) or (PO) play-off; (G) gold, (S) silver or (B) bronze Olympic/Paralympic medal; (NMS) not a Masters tournament; (NTI) not a Tier I tournament; (P) postponed; (NH) not held; (SR) strike rate (events won / competed); (W–L) win–loss record.
To avoid confusion and double counting, these charts are updated at the conclusion of a tournament or when the player's participation has ended.

Only main-draw results in WTA Tour, Grand Slam tournaments, Billie Jean King Cup, United Cup, Hopman Cup and Olympic Games are included in win–loss records.

=== Singles ===
Current through the 2023 WTA Tour.

Tournament	2013	2014	2015	2016	2017	2018	2019	2020	2021	2022	2023	SR	W–L	Win%
Grand Slam tournaments
Australian Open	A	Q1	2R	Q2	Q1	A	Q3	A	A	A	A	0 / 1	1–1	50%
French Open	A	Q3	2R	Q2	Q2	A	Q1	A	Q1	A	A	0 / 1	1–1	50%
Wimbledon	A	4R	1R	Q2	Q1	1R	Q2	NH	Q3	Q1	A	0 / 3	3–3	50%
US Open	A	1R	2R	Q2	Q1	Q2	Q1	A	A	A	A	0 / 2	1–2	33%
Win–Loss	0–0	3–2	3–4	0–0	0–0	0–1	0–0	0–0	0–0	0–0	0–0	0 / 7	6–7	46%
WTA 1000 tournaments
Qatar / Dubai Open (Note: The first Premier 5 event of the year has switched back and forth between the Dubai Tennis Championships and the Qatar Total Open since 2009. Dubai was classified as a Premier 5 event from 2009 to 2011, before being succeeded by Doha for the 2012–2014 period. In 2015, Dubai regained its Premier 5 status while Doha was demoted to Premier status. The Premier 5 tournaments were reclassified as WTA 1000 tournaments in 2021.)	A	A	Q1	A	A	A	A	A	A	A	A	0 / 0	0–0	–
Indian Wells Open	A	A	1R	A	A	A	A	NH	A	A	A	0 / 1	0–1	0%
Miami Open	A	A	2R	A	A	Q1	A	NH	A	A	A	0 / 1	1–1	50%
Canadian Open	A	1R	Q2	A	A	A	A	NH	A	A	A	0 / 1	0–1	0%
Career statistics
Tournaments	2	5	16	3	2	2	2	0	1	0	0	Career total: 33		
Overall Win-Loss	1–2	3–5	9–16	1–3	0–2	0–2	1–2	0–0	1–1	0–0	0–0	0 / 33	16–33	33%
Year-end ranking (Note: 2011: WTA ranking – 867, 2012: WTA ranking – 391.)	239	83	125	182	224	136	261	386	260	490	464	$1,087,469		

=== Doubles ===
Tournament	2014	2015	2016	2017	2018	2019	...	2022	2023	SR	W–L	Win%
Grand Slam tournaments
Australian Open	A	A	A	A	A	A		A	A	0 / 0	0–0	–
French Open	A	1R	A	A	A	A		A	A	0 / 1	0–1	0%
Wimbledon	A	1R	A	A	A	A		A	A	0 / 1	0–1	0%
US Open	1R	A	A	A	A	A		A	A	0 / 1	0–1	0%
Win–Loss	0–1	0–2	0–0	0–0	0–0	0–0		0–0	0–0	0 / 3	0–3	0%
Career statistics
Tournaments	2	4	1	1	0	1		0	0	Career total: 9		
Overall Win-Loss	0–2	1–4	0–1	0–1	0–0	2–1		0–0	0–0	0 / 9	3–9	25%
Year-end ranking (Note: 2011: WTA ranking – 813, 2012: WTA ranking – 383, 2013: WTA ranking – 268, 2020: WTA ranking – 322, 2021: WTA ranking – 495.)	246	335	1040	348	415	344	495	n/a	1082			

== WTA 125 finals ==
=== Singles: 1 (title) ===
Result	Date	Tournament	Surface	Opponent	Score
Win	Nov 2014	Open de Limoges, France	Hard (i)	(France) Kristina Mladenovic	7–6^{(7–4)}, 7–5

== ITF Circuit finals ==
=== Singles: 15 (8 titles, 7 runner-ups) ===
Legend $100,000 tournaments $50/60,000 tournaments $25,000 tournaments $10/15,000 tournaments	Finals by surface Hard (6–3) Clay (1–4) Grass (1–0)

Result	W–L	Date	Tournament	Tier	Surface	Opponent	Score
Loss	0–1	Aug 2011	ITF Iława, Poland	10,000	Clay	(Norway) Ulrikke Eikeri	3–6, 2–6
Win	1–1	Jan 2012	ITF Stuttgart, Germany	10,000	Hard (i)	(Ukraine) Maryna Zanevska	6–4, 7–6^{(7–4)}
Loss	1–2	Feb 2012	ITF Leimen, Germany	10,000	Hard (i)	(Austria) Melanie Klaffner	6–2, 6–7^{(5–7)}, 1–6
Win	2–2	Mar 2012	GB Pro-Series Bath, United Kingdom	10,000	Hard (i)	(Poland) Katarzyna Piter	4–6, 6–2, 6–1
Win	3–2	Apr 2012	ITF Hvar, Croatia	10,000	Clay	(Croatia) Karla Popović	2–6, 6–2, 6–4
Win	4–2	Apr 2014	ITF Qarshi, Uzbekistan	25,000	Hard	(Uzbekistan) Nigina Abduraimova	6–3, 4–6, 7–6^{(7–4)}
Loss	4–3	Jul 2016	Reinert Open, Germany	50,000	Clay	(Germany) Antonia Lottner	6–3, 5–7, 3–6
Loss	4–4	Jul 2016	ITF Horb, Germany	25,000	Clay	(Germany) Tamara Korpatsch	2–6, 1–6
Win	5–4	Oct 2017	Open de Touraine, France	25,000	Hard (i)	(France) Myrtille Georges	6–3, 7–5
Win	6–4	Feb 2018	GB Pro-Series Loughborough, UK	25,000	Hard (i)	(Switzerland) Conny Perrin	6–3, 6–2
Win	7–4	Jun 2018	Ilkley Trophy, UK	100,000	Grass	(Ukraine) Dayana Yastremska	7–6^{(7–2)}, 3–6, 7–6^{(7–4)}
Win	8–4	Aug 2018	GB Pro-Series Foxhills, UK	25,000	Hard	(Serbia) Ivana Jorović	6–7^{(5–7)}, 7–5, 6–4
Loss	8–5	Mar 2021	ITF Bratislava, Slovakia	15,000	Hard (i)	(Czech Republic) Linda Nosková	6–4, 6–7^{(4–7)}, 5–7
Loss	8–6	Sep 2021	Prague Open, Czech Republic	60,000	Clay	(Poland) Magdalena Fręch	2–6, 1–6
Loss	8–7	Feb 2023	GB Pro-Series Bath, United Kingdom	25,000	Hard (i)	(Slovakia) Rebecca Šramková	2–6, 2–6

=== Doubles: 14 (7 titles, 7 runner-ups) ===
Legend $50/60,000 tournaments $25,000 tournaments $10/15,000 tournaments	Finals by surface Hard (2–3) Clay (4–4) Carpet (1–0)

Result	W–L	Date	Tournament	Tier	Surface	Partner	Opponents	Score
Win	1–0	Apr 2012	ITF Hvar, Croatia	10,000	Clay	(Czech Republic) Martina Kubičíková	(Czech Republic) Tereza Martincová (Czech Republic) Petra Rohanová	6–2, 6–4
Loss	1–1	Apr 2012	ITF Bol, Croatia	10,000	Clay	(Czech Republic) Jesika Malečková	(Italy) Nicole Clerico (France) Anaïs Laurendon	2–6, 0–6
Win	2–1	Aug 2012	ITF Prague, Czech Republic	25,000	Clay	(Czech Republic) Jesika Malečková	(Russia) Anastasia Pivovarova (Russia) Arina Rodionova	6–1, 6–4
Loss	2–2	Nov 2012	ITF Vendryně, Czech Republic	15,000	Hard (i)	(Czech Republic) Martina Kubičíková	(Czech Republic) Jesika Malečková (Czech Republic) Kateřina Vaňková	6–7^{(2–7)}, 2–6
Win	3–2	Jun 2013	Zlín Open, Czech Republic	25,000	Clay	(Czech Republic) Martina Borecká	(Poland) Paula Kania (Poland) Katarzyna Piter	6–1, 5–7, [10–8]
Loss	3–3	Aug 2013	ITF Braunschweig, Germany	15,000	Clay	(Czech Republic) Tereza Malíková	(France) Clothilde de Bernardi (Bulgaria) Isabella Shinikova	6–3, 1–6, [8–10]
Loss	3–4	Sep 2013	Save Cup Mestre, Italy	50,000	Clay	(Czech Republic) Petra Krejsová	(France) Laura Thorpe (Liechtenstein) Stephanie Vogt	6–7^{(5–7)}, 5–7
Loss	3–5	Sep 2013	GB Pro-Series Loughborough, UK	25,000	Hard (i)	(Poland) Magda Linette	(Turkey) Çağla Büyükakçay (Turkey) Pemra Özgen	2–6, 7–5, [6–10]
Win	4–5	Nov 2013	ITF Zawada, Poland	25,000	Carpet (i)	(Czech Republic) Nikola Fraňková	(Poland) Justyna Jegiołka (Latvia) Diāna Marcinkēviča	6–1, 2–6, [10–8]
Win	5–5	Apr 2014	Lale Cup Istanbul, Turkey	50,000	Hard	(Czech Republic) Petra Krejsová	(Netherlands) Michaëlla Krajicek (Serbia) Aleksandra Krunić	1–6, 7–6^{(7–2)}, [11–9]
Win	6–5	Feb 2017	Open de Grenoble, France	25,000	Hard (i)	(Belarus) Ilona Kremen	(Romania) Alexandra Cadanțu (Sweden) Cornelia Lister	6–1, 7–5
Loss	6–6	Sep 2017	Ladies Open Dunakeszi, Hungary	60,000	Clay	(Romania) Alexandra Cadanțu	(Romania) Irina Bara (Slovakia) Chantal Škamlová	6–7^{(9–11)}, 4–6
Win	7–6	Sep 2020	Přerov Cup, Czech Republic	25,000	Clay	(Slovakia) Chantal Škamlová	(Romania) Nicoleta Dascălu (Cyprus) Raluca Șerban	7–6^{(7–5)}, 7–6^{(4)}
Loss	7–7	Mar 2021	ITF Bratislava, Slovakia	10,000	Clay	(Czech Republic) Veronika Vlkovská	(Estonia) Elena Malõgina (France) Alice Robbe	6–3, 3–6, [5–10]
