= Tennis at the 2013 Games of the Small States of Europe =

- Date: 1–4 June
- Location: Stade Josy Barthel, Luxembourg

Champions

Men's singles
- Thomas Oger (MON)

Women's singles
- Stephanie Vogt (LIE)

Men's doubles
- Guillaume Couillard / Thomas Oger (MON)

Women's doubles
- Stephanie Vogt / Kathinka von Deichmann (LIE)

Mixed doubles
- Stephanie Vogt / Timo Kranz (LIE)
← 2011 ·	Games of the Small States of Europe	· 2015 →

Tennis competitions at the 2013 Games of the Small States of Europe was held from May 28 to June 1 at the Stade Josy Barthel, Luxembourg.

== Medal summary ==
=== Medal table ===
* Host nation (Luxembourg)

Rank	Nation	Gold	Silver	Bronze	Total
1	Liechtenstein	3	1	0	4
2	Monaco	2	0	1	3
3	Malta	0	2	0	2
4	Luxembourg*	0	1	6	7
5	Cyprus	0	1	1	2
6	San Marino	0	0	1	1
Totals (6 entries)		5	5	9	19

=== Medal events ===
Event	Gold	Silver	Bronze
Men's singles	(Monaco) Thomas Oger	(Cyprus) Petros Chrysochos	(Luxembourg) Mike Scheidweiler
Men's singles	(Monaco) Thomas Oger	(Cyprus) Petros Chrysochos	(Luxembourg) Ugo Nastasi
Women's singles	(Liechtenstein) Stephanie Vogt	(Liechtenstein) Kathinka von Deichmann	(Luxembourg) Tiffany Cornelius
Women's singles	(Liechtenstein) Stephanie Vogt	(Liechtenstein) Kathinka von Deichmann	(Luxembourg) Laura Correia
Men's doubles	(Monaco) Guillaume Couillard (Monaco) Thomas Oger	(Luxembourg) Ugo Nastasi (Luxembourg) Mike Scheidweiler	(Cyprus) Petros Chrysochos (Cyprus) Sergis Kyratzis
Men's doubles	(Monaco) Guillaume Couillard (Monaco) Thomas Oger	(Luxembourg) Ugo Nastasi (Luxembourg) Mike Scheidweiler	(San Marino) Marco de Rossi (San Marino) Stefano Galvani
Women's doubles	(Liechtenstein) Stephanie Vogt (Liechtenstein) Kathinka von Deichmann	(Malta) Roseanne Dimech (Malta) Elaine Genovese	(Luxembourg) Laura Correia (Luxembourg) Sharon Pesch
Mixed doubles	(Liechtenstein) Stephanie Vogt (Liechtenstein) Timo Kranz	(Malta) Elaine Genovese (Malta) Matthew Asciak	(Luxembourg) Tiffany Cornelius (Luxembourg) Laurent Bram
Mixed doubles	(Liechtenstein) Stephanie Vogt (Liechtenstein) Timo Kranz	(Malta) Elaine Genovese (Malta) Matthew Asciak	(Monaco) Louise-Alice Gambarini (Monaco) Benjamin Balleret
