= Tennis at the 2013 Games of the Small States of Europe – Men's doubles =

Men's doubles
- Tennis at the 2013 Games of the Small States of Europe

Final
- Champions: (Monaco) Guillaume Couillard; (Monaco) Thomas Oger
- Runners-up: (Luxembourg) Ugo Nastasi; (Luxembourg) Mike Scheidweiler
- Score: 6–4, 7–6

Events
Singles	men	women
Doubles	men	women	mixed
← 2011 ·	Games of the Small States of Europe	· 2015 →

Guillaume Couillard and Thomas Oger successfully defended their title by defeating Ugo Nastasi and Mike Scheidweiler 6–4, 7–6 in the final.

== Draw ==
=== Key ===
- Q = Qualifier
- WC = Wild card
- LL = Lucky loser
- Alt = Alternate
- ITF = ITF entry
- PR = Protected ranking
- SR = Special ranking
- SE = Special exempt
- JE = Junior exempt
- JR = Junior Accelerator Programme entrant
- CO = College Accelerator Programme entrant
- NG = Next Gen Accelerator Program entrant
- w/o = Walkover
- r = Retired
- d = Defaulted

=== Draw ===
First round			Semifinals				Final
			(Luxembourg) U Nastasi (Luxembourg) M Scheidweiler	6	4	[10]
(Cyprus) P Chrysochos (Cyprus) S Kyratzis	6	6	(Cyprus) P Chrysochos (Cyprus) S Kyratzis	4	6	[5]
(Iceland) RK Bonifacius (Iceland) B Gunnarsson	4	4					(Luxembourg) U Nastasi (Luxembourg) M Scheidweiler	4	6
(Monaco) G Couillard (Monaco) T Oger	6	6					(Monaco) G Couillard (Monaco) T Oger	6	7
(Liechtenstein) T Kranz (Liechtenstein) T Weirather	3	2	(Monaco) G Couillard (Monaco) T Oger	6	6
			(San Marino) M de Rossi (San Marino) S Galvani	3	2
