= Tennis at the 2013 Games of the Small States of Europe – Men's singles =

Men's singles
- Tennis at the 2013 Games of the Small States of Europe

Final
- Champion: (Monaco) Thomas Oger
- Runner-up: (Cyprus) Petros Chrysochos
- Score: 4–6, 6–3, 6–3

Events
Singles	men	women
Doubles	men	women	mixed
← 2011 ·	Games of the Small States of Europe	· 2015 →

Stefano Galvani was the defending champion but lost in the quarterfinals.
Thomas Oger defeated Petros Chrysochos 4–6, 6–3, 6–3 in the final.

== Draw ==
=== Key ===
- Q = Qualifier
- WC = Wild card
- LL = Lucky loser
- Alt = Alternate
- ITF = ITF entry
- PR = Protected ranking
- SR = Special ranking
- SE = Special exempt
- JE = Junior exempt
- JR = Junior Accelerator Programme entrant
- CO = College Accelerator Programme entrant
- NG = Next Gen Accelerator Program entrant
- w/o = Walkover
- r = Retired
- d = Defaulted

=== Draw ===
First round
(Luxembourg) M Scheidweiler	6	6
(San Marino) M de Rossi	3	4
(Malta) M Asciak	6	6
(Iceland) B Gunnarsson	1	0
(Cyprus) P Chrysochos	6	6
(Liechtenstein) T Kranz	2	4
(Cyprus) S Kyratzis	6	6
(Liechtenstein) T Weirather	3	4
(Monaco) T Oger	6	6
(Iceland) EK Bonifacius	1	2

Quarterfinals
(Monaco) B Balleret	6	3	1
(Luxembourg) M Scheidweiler	3	6	6
(Malta) M Asciak	7	4	4
(Cyprus) P Chrysochos	5	6	6
(Cyprus) S Kyratzis	6	1	6^{4}
(Luxembourg) U Nastasi	3	6	7^{7}
(Monaco) T Oger	5	7^{7}	6
(San Marino) S Galvani	7	6^{5}	4

Semifinals
(Luxembourg) M Scheidweiler	3	6^{4}
(Cyprus) P Chrysochos	6	7^{7}
(Luxembourg) U Nastasi	6^{2}	4
(Monaco) T Oger	7^{7}	6

Final
(Cyprus) P Chrysochos	6	3	3
(Monaco) T Oger	4	6	6
