= Tennis at the 2013 Games of the Small States of Europe – Women's singles =

Women's singles
- Tennis at the 2013 Games of the Small States of Europe

Final
- Champion: (Liechtenstein) Stephanie Vogt
- Runner-up: (Liechtenstein) Kathinka von Deichmann
- Score: 6–2, 6–2

Events
Singles	men	women
Doubles	men	women	mixed
← 2011 ·	Games of the Small States of Europe	· 2015 →

Stephanie Vogt successfully defended her title by defeating Kathinka von Deichmann 6–2, 6–2 in the final.

== Draw ==
=== Key ===
- Q = Qualifier
- WC = Wild card
- LL = Lucky loser
- Alt = Alternate
- ITF = ITF entry
- PR = Protected ranking
- SR = Special ranking
- SE = Special exempt
- JE = Junior exempt
- JR = Junior Accelerator Programme entrant
- CO = College Accelerator Programme entrant
- NG = Next Gen Accelerator Program entrant
- w/o = Walkover
- r = Retired
- d = Defaulted

=== Draw ===
First round
(Luxembourg) T Cornelius	6	6
(Iceland) I Staub	1	2

Quarterfinals
(Liechtenstein) S Vogt	6	6
(Malta) E Genovese	1	1
(Monaco) L-A Gambarini	3	4
(Luxembourg) T Cornelius	6	6
(Malta) R Dimech	3	1
(Luxembourg) L Correia	6	6
(Iceland) HR Gudmundsdóttir	0	0
(Liechtenstein) K von Deichmann	6	6

Semifinals
(Liechtenstein) S Vogt	6	6
(Luxembourg) T Cornelius	2	0
(Luxembourg) L Correia	3	2
(Liechtenstein) K von Deichmann	6	6

Final
(Liechtenstein) S Vogt	6	6
(Liechtenstein) K von Deichmann	2	2
