= Tennis at the 2013 Games of the Small States of Europe – Mixed doubles =

Mixed doubles
- Tennis at the 2013 Games of the Small States of Europe

Final
- Champions: (Liechtenstein) Stephanie Vogt; (Liechtenstein) Timo Kranz
- Runners-up: (Malta) Elaine Genovese; (Malta) Matthew Asciak
- Score: 7–6^{(8–6)}, 7–5

Events
Singles	men	women
Doubles	men	women	mixed
← 2011 ·	Games of the Small States of Europe	· 2015 →

Stephanie Vogt and Jirka Lokaj were the defending champions but Lokaj decided not to participate.
Vogt played alongside Timo Kranz and defended the title by defeating Elaine Genovese and Matthew Asciak 7–6^{(8–6)}, 7–5 in the final.

== Draw ==
=== Key ===
- Q = Qualifier
- WC = Wild card
- LL = Lucky loser
- Alt = Alternate
- ITF = ITF entry
- PR = Protected ranking
- SR = Special ranking
- SE = Special exempt
- JE = Junior exempt
- JR = Junior Accelerator Programme entrant
- CO = College Accelerator Programme entrant
- NG = Next Gen Accelerator Program entrant
- w/o = Walkover
- r = Retired
- d = Defaulted

=== Draw ===
First round			Semifinals				Final
			(Liechtenstein) S Vogt (Liechtenstein) T Kranz	3	6	[10]
			(Luxembourg) T Cornelius (Luxembourg) L Bram	6	3	[5]
							(Liechtenstein) S Vogt (Liechtenstein) T Kranz	7^{8}	7
(Iceland) I Staub (Iceland) B Gunnarsson	1	1					(Malta) E Genovese (Malta) M Asciak	6^{6}	5
(Malta) E Genovese (Malta) M Asciak	6	6	(Malta) E Genovese (Malta) M Asciak	4	6	[10]
			(Monaco) L-A Gambarini (Monaco) B Balleret	6	2	[7]
