= Tennis at the 2011 Games of the Small States of Europe =

- Date: 1–4 June
- Location: Tenniscenter Bannholz, Vaduz

Champions

Men's singles
- Stefano Galvani (SMR)

Women's singles
- Stephanie Vogt (LIE)

Men's doubles
- Guillaume Couillard / Thomas Oger (MON)

Women's doubles
- Stephanie Vogt / Kathinka von Deichmann (LIE)

Mixed doubles
- Stephanie Vogt / Jirka Lokaj (LIE)
← 2009 ·	Games of the Small States of Europe	· 2013 →

Tennis competitions at the 2011 Games of the Small States of Europe were held from June 1 to June 4 at the Tenniscenter Bannholz in Vaduz. The tournament was played on clay courts.

== Medal summary ==
=== Medal table ===
Rank	Nation	Gold	Silver	Bronze	Total
1	Liechtenstein	3	1	2	6
2	Monaco	1	1	2	4
3	San Marino	1	1	0	2
4	Luxembourg	0	1	2	3
5	Malta	0	1	1	2
6	Cyprus	0	0	2	2
7	Iceland	0	0	1	1
Totals (7 entries)		5	5	10	20

=== Medal events ===
Event	Gold	Silver	Bronze
Men's singles	Stefano Galvani (SMR)	Benjamin Balleret (MON)	Mike Vermeer (LUX)
Men's singles	Stefano Galvani (SMR)	Benjamin Balleret (MON)	Guillaume Couillard (MON)
Women's singles	Stephanie Vogt (LIE)	Kathinka von Deichmann (LIE)	Mara Argyriou (CYP)
Women's singles	Stephanie Vogt (LIE)	Kathinka von Deichmann (LIE)	Claudine Schaul (LUX)
Men's doubles	Guillaume Couillard (MON); Thomas Oger (MON)	Stefano Galvani (SMR); Domenico Vicini (SMR)	Matthew Asciak (MLT); Nick Camilleri (MLT)
Men's doubles	Guillaume Couillard (MON); Thomas Oger (MON)	Stefano Galvani (SMR); Domenico Vicini (SMR)	Timo Kranz (LIE); Jirka Lokaj (LIE)
Women's doubles	Stephanie Vogt (LIE); Kathinka von Deichmann (LIE)	Kimberley Cassar (MLT); Elena Jetcheva (MLT)	Mara Argyriou (CYP); Ioanna-Nena Savva (CYP)
Women's doubles	Stephanie Vogt (LIE); Kathinka von Deichmann (LIE)	Kimberley Cassar (MLT); Elena Jetcheva (MLT)	Sandra Dis Kristansdottir (ISL); Iris Staub (ISL)
Mixed doubles	Jirka Lokaj (LIE); Stephanie Vogt (LIE)	Claudine Schaul (LUX); Mike Vermeer (LUX)	(Cyprus) Ioanna-Nena Savva (Cyprus) Filippos Tsangaridis
Mixed doubles	Jirka Lokaj (LIE); Stephanie Vogt (LIE)	Claudine Schaul (LUX); Mike Vermeer (LUX)	(Monaco) Louise-Alice Gambarini (Monaco) Benjamin Balleret
