= Tennis at the 2013 Games of the Small States of Europe – Women's doubles =

Women's doubles
- Tennis at the 2013 Games of the Small States of Europe

Final
- Champions: (Liechtenstein) Stephanie Vogt; (Liechtenstein) Kathinka von Deichmann
- Runners-up: (Malta) Roseanne Dimech; (Malta) Elaine Genovese
- Score: 6–1, 7–6

Events
Singles	men	women
Doubles	men	women	mixed
← 2011 ·	Games of the Small States of Europe	· 2015 →

Stephanie Vogt and Kathinka von Deichmann successfully defended their title by defeating Roseanne Dimech and Elaine Genovese 6–1, 7–6 in the final.

== Draw ==
=== Key ===
- Q = Qualifier
- WC = Wild card
- LL = Lucky loser
- Alt = Alternate
- SE = Special exempt
- PR = Protected ranking
- ITF = ITF entry
- JE = Junior exempt
- w/o = Walkover
- r = Retired
- d = Defaulted
- SR = Special ranking

=== Draw ===
Semifinals
(Liechtenstein) S Vogt (Liechtenstein) K von Deichmann	6	6
(Luxembourg) L Correia (Luxembourg) S Pesch	1	3
(Malta) R Dimech (Malta) E Genovese	6	6
(Iceland) HR Gudmundsdóttir (Iceland) I Staub	4	2

Final
(Liechtenstein) S Vogt (Liechtenstein) K von Deichmann	6	7
(Malta) R Dimech (Malta) E Genovese	1	6
Bronze medal game
(Luxembourg) L Correia (Luxembourg) S Pesch	6	6
(Iceland) HR Gudmundsdóttir (Iceland) I Staub	2	1
