= 2010 Fed Cup Europe/Africa Zone Group II – Pool A =

Group A of the 2010 Fed Cup Europe/Africa Zone Group II was one of two pools in the Europe/Africa Zone Group II of the 2010 Fed Cup. Four teams competed in a round robin competition, with the top team and the bottom two teams proceeding to their respective sections of the play-offs: the top teams played for advancement to Group I, while the bottom teams faced potential relegation to Group III.

		(South Africa) RSA	(Luxembourg) LUX	(Greece) GRE	(Liechtenstein) LIE	RR; W–L	Set; W–L	Game; W–L	Standings
56	South Africa		1–2	0–2	2–1	1–2	4–10	56–77	3
62	Luxembourg	2–1		1–2	2–0	2–1	4–2	27–13	2
64	Greece	2–0	2–1		3–0	3–0	10–2	65–41	1
78	Liechtenstein	1–2	0–2	0–3		0–3	2–6	54–71	4

== Greece vs. Liechtenstein ==
Greece
3
Orange Fitness & Tennis Club, Yerevan, Armenia
28 April 2010
Red clay (outdoors)

Liechtenstein
0

			1	2	3
1	(Greece) (Liechtenstein)	Anna Gerasimou; Kathinka von Deichmann	6; 2	6; 2
2	(Greece) (Liechtenstein)	Eleni Daniilidou; Stephanie Vogt	4; 6	6; 4	7^{7} 6^{1}
3	(Greece) (Liechtenstein)	Eirini Georgatou / Despina Papamichail; Marina Novak / Stephanie Vogt	6; 3	4; 6	[11] [9]

== South Africa vs. Luxembourg ==
South Africa
1
Orange Fitness & Tennis Club, Yerevan, Armenia
29 April 2010
Red clay (outdoors)

Luxembourg
2

			1	2	3
1	(South Africa) (Luxembourg)	Christi Potgieter; Anne Kremer	1; 6	0; 6
2	(South Africa) (Luxembourg)	Chanel Simmonds; Mandy Minella	0; 6	0; 6
3	(South Africa) (Luxembourg)	Christi Potgieter / Chanel Simmonds; Mandy Minella / Claudine Schaul	6; 2	6; 1

== South Africa vs. Greece ==
South Africa
1
Orange Fitness & Tennis Club, Yerevan, Armenia
30 April 2010
Red clay (outdoors)

Greece
2

			1	2	3
1	(South Africa) (Greece)	Christi Potgieter; Eirini Georgatou	2; 6	5; 7
2	(South Africa) (Greece)	Chanel Simmonds; Anna Gerasimou	1; 6	4; 6
3	(South Africa) (Greece)	Christi Potgieter / Chanel Simmonds; Eleni Daniilidou / Despina Papamichail				not played

== South Africa vs. Liechtenstein ==
South Africa
2
Orange Fitness & Tennis Club, Yerevan, Armenia
30 April 2010
Red clay (outdoors)

Liechtenstein
1

			1	2	3
1	(South Africa) (Liechtenstein)	Christi Potgieter; Kathinka von Deichmann	6; 3	6; 0
2	(South Africa) (Liechtenstein)	Chanel Simmonds; Stephanie Vogt	5; 7	1; 6
3	(South Africa) (Liechtenstein)	Christi Potgieter / Chanel Simmonds; Marina Novak / Kathinka von Deichmann	7^{7} 6^{0}	6; 3

== Luxembourg vs. Greece ==
Luxembourg
1
Orange Fitness & Tennis Club, Yerevan, Armenia
30 April 2010
Red clay (outdoors)

Greece
2

			1	2	3
1	(Luxembourg) (Greece)	Claudine Schaul; Anna Gerasimou	2; 6	3; 6
2	(Luxembourg) (Greece)	Anne Kremer; Eleni Daniilidou	5; 4			retired
3	(Luxembourg) (Greece)	Mandy Minella / Claudine Schaul; Eleni Daniilidou / Despina Papamichail				w/o

== Luxembourg vs. Liechtenstein ==
Luxembourg
2
Orange Fitness & Tennis Club, Yerevan, Armenia
30 April 2010
Red clay (outdoors)

Liechtenstein
0

			1	2	3
1	(Luxembourg) (Liechtenstein)	Anne Kremer; Marina Novak	6; 3	6; 1
2	(Luxembourg) (Liechtenstein)	Mandy Minella; Stephanie Vogt	6; 4	6; 4
3	(Luxembourg) (Liechtenstein)	Mandy Minella / Claudine Schaul; Stephanie Vogt / Kathinka von Deichmann				not played

== See also ==
- Fed Cup structure
