= Tennis at the 2003 Games of the Small States of Europe =

- Date: 3 – 7 June
- Location: Marsa Sports Club

Champions

Men's singles
- Gilles Müller (LUX)

Women's singles
- Claudine Schaul (LUX)

Men's doubles
- Gilles Müller / Mike Scheidweiler (LUX)

Women's doubles
- Mandy Minella / Claudine Schaul (LUX)
← 2001 ·	Games of the Small States of Europe	· 2005 →

Tennis competitions at the 2003 Games of the Small States of Europe in Malta were held from June 3 to June 7 at the Marsa Sports Club in Marsa. The tournament took place on Hard courts.

== Events ==
=== Men's singles ===
Round One
Arnar Sigurdsson (ISL)	6	6^{7}	6
Domenico Vicini (SMR)	2	7^{9}	3
Joan Jiménez Guerra (AND)	0	3
Jirka Lokaj (LIE)	6	6
Emmanuel Heussner (MON)	6	6
Mark Schembri (MLT)	4	4
Herbert Weirather (LIE)	6	6
Marcus Delicata (MLT)	4	2
Marc Curt Vilanova (AND)	1	1
Guillaume Couillard (MON)	6	6
Christian Rosti (SMR)	6	0	4
Raj Kumar Bonifacius (ISL)	4	6	6

Quarter Finals
Gilles Müller (LUX)	6	6
Arnar Sigurdsson (ISL)	1	2
Jirka Lokaj (LIE)	7	6
Emmanuel Heussner (MON)	6	4
Herbert Weirather (LIE)	4	2
Guillaume Couillard (MON)	6	6
Raj Kumar Bonifacius (ISL)	6^{3}	0
Mike Scheidweiler (LUX)	7^{7}	6

Semi Finals
Gilles Müller (LUX)	6	6
Jirka Lokaj (LIE)	1	3
Guillaume Couillard (MON)	6^{3}	4
Mike Scheidweiler (LUX)	7^{7}	6

Gold Medal Match
Gilles Müller (LUX)	6	6
Mike Scheidweiler (LUX)	2	3

=== Women's singles ===
Round One
Rakel Petursdóttir (ISL)	2	3
Johanna Armita (MON)	6	6

Quarter Finals
Claudine Schaul (LUX)	6	6
Johanna Armita (MON)	0	1
Lisa Caminzuli (MLT)	6	6
Martina Agarici (SMR)	1	0
Sigurlaug Sigurdardottir (ISL)	1	1
Nathalie Welker (MON)	6	6
Rosanne Dimech (MLT)	2	2
Mandy Minella (LUX)	6	6

Semi Finals
Claudine Schaul (LUX)	6	6
Lisa Caminzuli (MLT)	1	1
Nathalie Welker (MON)	0	0
Mandy Minella (LUX)	6	6

Gold Medal Match
Claudine Schaul (LUX)	7^{7}	7
Mandy Minella (LUX)	6^{5}	5

=== Men's doubles ===
Quarterfinals
Jirka Lokaj (LIE); Alex Risch (LIE)	3	6	6^{7}
Christian Rosti (SMR); Domenico Vicini (SMR)	6	1	7^{9}
Benjamin Balleret (MON); Emmanuel Heussner (MON)	4	6	6
Raj Kumar Bonifacius (ISL); Arnar Sigurdsson (ISL)	6	3	4
Gordon Asciak (MLT); Mark Schembri (MLT)	6^{5}	4
Joan Jiménez Guerra (AND); Jorge Vila Vila (AND)	7^{7}	6

Semifinals
Gilles Müller (LUX); Mike Scheidweiler (LUX)	6	6
Christian Rosti (SMR); Domenico Vicini (SMR)	0	0
Benjamin Balleret (MON); Emmanuel Heussner (MON)	1	7^{7}	6
Joan Jiménez Guerra (AND); Jorge Vila Vila (AND)	6	6^{4}	3

Gold Medal Match
Gilles Müller (LUX); Mike Scheidweiler (LUX)	7^{8}	6
Benjamin Balleret (MON); Emmanuel Heussner (MON)	6^{6}	1

- Men's Doubles Results

=== Women's doubles ===
Quarter Finals
Mandy Minella (LUX); Claudine Schaul (LUX)
BYE
Diane Valetta (MON); Nathalie Welker (MON)
BYE
Rakel Petursdóttir (ISL); Rebekka Petursdottir (ISL)	1	0
Martina Agarici (SMR); Francesca Guardigli (SMR)	6	6
BYE
Lisa Caminzuli (MLT); Carol Cassar Torreggiani (MLT)

Semi Finals
Mandy Minella (LUX); Claudine Schaul (LUX)	6	6
Diane Valetta (MON); Nathalie Welker (MON)	0	0
Martina Agarici (SMR); Francesca Guardigli (SMR)	2	0
Lisa Caminzuli (MLT); Carol Cassar Torreggiani (MLT)	6	6

Gold Medal Match
Mandy Minella (LUX); Claudine Schaul (LUX)	6	7
Lisa Caminzuli (MLT); Carol Cassar Torreggiani (MLT)	4	5

Bronze Medal Match
Diane Valetta (MON); Nathalie Welker (MON)	6^{3}	1
Martina Agarici (SMR); Francesca Guardigli (SMR)	7^{7}	6
