= Tennis at the 2011 Games of the Small States of Europe – Men's singles =

Men's singles
- Tennis at the 2011 Games of the Small States of Europe

Final
- Champion: (San Marino) Stefano Galvani
- Runner-up: (Monaco) Benjamin Balleret
- Score: 6–3, 6–1

Events
Singles	men	women
Doubles	men	women	mixed
← 2009 ·	Games of the Small States of Europe	· 2013 →

Jean-René Lisnard was the defending champion but decided not to participate.

Stefano Galvani won in the final 6–3, 6–1 against Benjamin Balleret.

== Seeds ==
1. (San Marino) Stefano Galvani (champion)
2. (Monaco) Benjamin Balleret (final)
3. (Monaco) Guillaume Couillard (semifinals)
4. (Luxembourg) Mike Vermeer (semifinals)

== Draw ==
=== Key ===
- Q = Qualifier
- WC = Wild card
- LL = Lucky loser
- Alt = Alternate
- SE = Special exempt
- PR = Protected ranking
- ITF = ITF entry
- JE = Junior exempt
- w/o = Walkover
- r = Retired
- d = Defaulted
- SR = Special ranking

First round
(Malta) M Asciak	6	6
(Iceland) A Sigurdsson	0	0
3	(Monaco) G Couillard	6	6
(Liechtenstein) GC Besimo	0	3
(Andorra) JP Poux Gautier	3^{r}
(Cyprus) F Tsangaridis	6
(Andorra) D Gelabert	1	0
(Montenegro) L Čelebić	6	6
(Liechtenstein) J Lokaj	3	7	4
4	(Luxembourg) M Vermeer	6	5	6
(Malta) N Camilleri	6	6
(Iceland) B Gunnarsson	2	2
(San Marino) G Zonzini	1	5
2	(Monaco) B Balleret	6	7

Quarterfinals
1	(San Marino) S Galvani	6	6
(Malta) M Asciak	2	2
3	(Monaco) G Couillard	7^{7}	6
(Cyprus) F Tsangaridis	6^{1}	0
(Montenegro) L Čelebić	0	6	5
4	(Luxembourg) M Vermeer	6	3	7
(Malta) N Camilleri	1	3
2	(Monaco) B Balleret	6	6

Semifinals
1	(San Marino) S Galvani	7^{9}	7^{7}
3	(Monaco) Guillaume Couillard	6^{7}	6^{3}
4	(Luxembourg) M Vermeer	1	4
2	(Monaco) B Balleret	6	6

Final
1	(San Marino) S Galvani	6	6
2	(Monaco) B Balleret	3	1
