= Tennis at the 2011 Games of the Small States of Europe – Men's doubles =

Men's doubles
- Tennis at the 2011 Games of the Small States of Europe

Final
- Champions: (Monaco) Guillaume Couillard; (Monaco) Thomas Oger
- Runners-up: (San Marino) Stefano Galvani; (San Marino) Domenico Vicini
- Score: 6–3, 6–3

Events
Singles	men	women
Doubles	men	women	mixed
← 2009 ·	Games of the Small States of Europe	· 2013 →

Guillaume Couillard (tennis player) and Jean-René Lisnard were the defending champion but Lisnard decided not to participate.
Couillard plays alongside Thomas Oger, and they defeated Stefano Galvani and Domenico Vicini 6–3, 6–3 in the final.

== Seeds ==
1. (Monaco) Guillaume Couillard / Thomas Oger (champions)
2. (San Marino) Stefano Galvani / Domenico Vicini (final)

== Draw ==
=== Key ===
- Q = Qualifier
- WC = Wild card
- LL = Lucky loser
- Alt = Alternate
- SE = Special exempt
- PR = Protected ranking
- ITF = ITF entry
- JE = Junior exempt
- w/o = Walkover
- r = Retired
- d = Defaulted
- SR = Special ranking

First round			Semifinals					Final
			1	(Monaco) G Couillard (Monaco) T Oger	6	6
(Malta) M Asciak (Malta) N Camilleri	3			(Malta) M Asciak (Malta) N Camilleri	1	3
(Andorra) D Gelabert (Andorra) JP Pous Gautier	0^{r}							1	(Monaco) G Couillard (Monaco) T Oger	6	6
(Iceland) A Sigurdsson (Iceland) B Gunnarsson	2	4						2	(San Marino) S Galvani (San Marino) D Vicini	3	3
(Liechtenstein) T Kranz (Liechtenstein) J Lokaj	6	6		(Liechtenstein) T Kranz (Liechtenstein) J Lokaj	6	1	[6]
			2	(San Marino) S Galvani (San Marino) D Vicini	3	6	[10]
