= Tennis at the 2011 Games of the Small States of Europe – Women's doubles =

Women's doubles
- Tennis at the 2011 Games of the Small States of Europe

Final
- Champions: (Liechtenstein) Stephanie Vogt; (Liechtenstein) Kathinka von Deichmann
- Runners-up: (Malta) Kimberley Cassar; (Malta) Elena Jetcheva
- Score: 6–3, 6–3

Events
Singles	men	women
Doubles	men	women	mixed
← 2009 ·	Games of the Small States of Europe	· 2013 →

Mandy Minella and Claudine Schaul were the defending champion but decided not to participate.

Stephanie Vogt and Kathinka von Deichmann won in the final 6–3, 6–3 against Kimberley Cassar and Elena Jetcheva.

== Seeds ==
1. (Liechtenstein) Stephanie Vogt / Kathinka von Deichmann (champions)
2. (Malta) Kimberley Cassar / Elena Jetcheva (final)

== Draw ==
=== Key ===
- Q = Qualifier
- WC = Wild card
- LL = Lucky loser
- Alt = Alternate
- SE = Special exempt
- PR = Protected ranking
- ITF = ITF entry
- JE = Junior exempt
- w/o = Walkover
- r = Retired
- d = Defaulted
- SR = Special ranking

First round			Semifinals				Final
			1	(Liechtenstein) S Vogt (Liechtenstein) K von Deichmann	6	6
(Monaco) K Brett (Monaco) L-A Gambarini	0	0		(Cyprus) M Argyriou (Cyprus) I-N Savva	2	0
(Cyprus) M Argyriou (Cyprus) I-N Savva	6	6					1	(Liechtenstein) S Vogt (Liechtenstein) K von Deichmann	6	6
(Iceland) SD Kristansdottir (Iceland) I Staub	6	6					2	(Malta) K Cassar (Malta) E Jetcheva	3	3
(Andorra) AC Aguareles Loan (Andorra) B Juncosa Lluis	1	2		(Iceland) SD Kristansdottir (Iceland) I Staub	1	2
			2	(Malta) K Cassar (Malta) E Jetcheva	6	6
