= Stephanie Vogt =

Liechtenstein tennis player

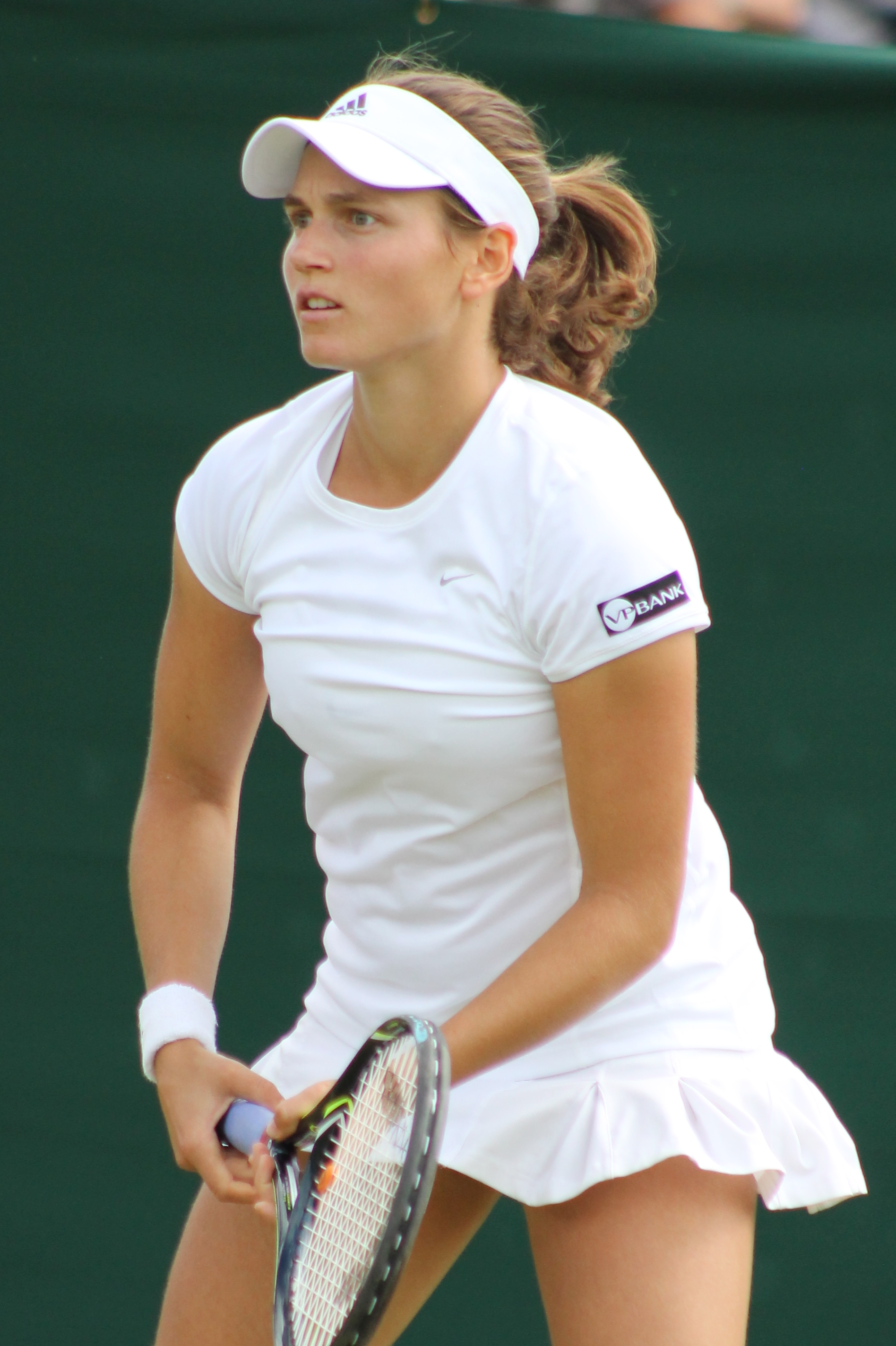
- Vogt at the 2015 Wimbledon qualifying
- Country (sports): Liechtenstein
- Residence: Balzers, Liechtenstein
- Born: 15 February 1990 (age 35); Vaduz, Liechtenstein
- Height: 1.67 m (5 ft 6 in)
- Turned pro: 2006
- Retired: August 2016
- Plays: Right (two-handed backhand)
- Prize money: $363,869

Singles
- Career record: 277–182
- Career titles: 12 ITF
- Highest ranking: No. 137 (24 February 2014)

Grand Slam singles results
- Australian Open: Q1 (2013, 2014, 2015, 2016)
- French Open: Q3 (2013)
- Wimbledon: Q3 (2014)
- US Open: Q2 (2012, 2014)

Other tournaments
- Olympic Games: 1R (2012, 2016)

Doubles
- Career record: 147–95
- Career titles: 2 WTA, 11 ITF
- Highest ranking: No. 69 (22 February 2016)

Grand Slam doubles results
- Australian Open: 2R (2016)
- French Open: 1R (2016)
- Wimbledon: 1R (2015)
- US Open: 1R (2014)

Team competitions
- Fed Cup: 24–18
Medal record
Games of the Small States of Europe
Gold medal – first place	2007 Monaco	Singles
Gold medal – first place	2011 Liechtenstein	Singles
Gold medal – first place	2011 Liechtenstein	Doubles
Gold medal – first place	2011 Liechtenstein	Mixed doubles
Gold medal – first place	2013 Luxembourg	Singles
Gold medal – first place	2013 Luxembourg	Doubles
Gold medal – first place	2013 Luxembourg	Mixed doubles
Silver medal – second place	2005 Andorra	Singles
Silver medal – second place	2005 Andorra	Doubles
Silver medal – second place	2007 Monaco	Doubles

Stephanie Vogt (German pronunciation: [ˈʃtɛfaniː ˈfoːkt]; born 15 February 1990) is a former professional tennis player from Liechtenstein.

In her career, Vogt won two doubles titles on the WTA Tour as wells as 12 singles and 11 doubles titles on the ITF Circuit. On 24 February 2014, she reached her best singles ranking of world No. 137. On 22 February 2016, she peaked at No. 69 in the WTA doubles rankings.

Playing for Liechtenstein Fed Cup team, Vogt achieved a win–loss record of 23–18.

== Biography ==
Vogt was born on 15 February 1990 to Erika and Ewald (the latter died 2007). She began playing tennis at age five. After playing with the Swiss junior team for some time, she turned professional in 2006, and simultaneously decided to move to Hungary to train with Zoltan Kuharszky, which would result in her reaching the mid-200s of the WTA rankings in 2008. She was awarded an invitation spot at the 2008 Summer Olympics in Beijing, but she was forced to withdraw due to a patella injury, which required surgery. Knee rehabilitation took approximately 18 months, during which Vogt finished school before returning to the professional circuit in 2011. Vogt was given the honor of being Liechtenstein's flag bearer during the 2012 Summer Olympics in London and also represented Liechtenstein at the 2016 Summer Olympics. By the time of her retirement in August 2016, she was the highest-ranked tennis player to ever represent her country.

== Career ==
Vogt had a successful junior career, winning five ITF singles titles, as well as six doubles titles. Her best ranking as a junior was world No. 5, and she finished her junior career with a record of 79–26.

Her success on the ITF Women's Circuit in 2008 led to the ITF announcing that she had been given one of the two invitations into the main draw for the Summer Olympics in Beijing. However, she was forced to withdraw through injury and that spot was given to Tamarine Tanasugarn of Thailand.

=== 2010–2011 ===
She reached six ITF singles finals, winning three in Egypt, Slovenia, and the Netherlands. She also reached five ITF doubles finals, losing all five. At the 2011 Games of the Small States of Europe, held in Liechtenstein, Vogt won three gold medals. She defeated Kathinka von Deichmann in the final of the singles, whilst also partnering with von Deichmann to win the women's doubles. The mixed doubles was won with Jirka Lokaj. This built on her success from the 2007 Games, when she won a gold medal in the singles, before combining with Marina Novak to take silver in the doubles. She did not participate in the 2009 event.

=== 2012 ===
Vogt represented Liechtenstein also at the London Summer Olympics. Ranked No. 236, she did not qualify through rankings and was thus given a Tripartite Commission Invitation to play in the singles draw. In the first round, she played against Anna Tatishvili of Georgia and lost, 2–6, 0–6. On the ITF Circuit, she won two tournaments in doubles, in Bath and Aschaffenburg, and reached the singles final at Netanya, losing to Anna Karolína Schmiedlová in three sets.

=== 2013: First WTA Tour title ===
In July, she won her biggest title in Biarritz, where she beat Schmiedlová in three sets. Following this win, Vogt cracked the top 150 for the first time in her career. She was in touching distance of a main-draw berth at the French Open, defeating two players in qualifying before losing out to Barbora Záhlavová-Strýcová in straight sets. One month later, she won another singles title in Podgorica by beating Anett Kontaveit in the final, in straight sets.

In October, she took part in the qualifying of the WTA Ladies Linz in Austria, where she defeated Christina McHale in the first round but lost in the second against Katarzyna Piter, in a narrow three-setter. In the doubles, she teamed with Yanina Wickmayer, losing to the pair of Mona Barthel and Irina-Camelia Begu, in the super tie-breaker. The following week, she played the qualifying for the WTA tournament in Luxembourg, she beat Melanie South in the first round, 6–1, 6–2, but lost in the second round against Alison Van Uytvanck, in three sets. In the first round of the doubles, she partnered again with Yanina Wickmayer, and they defeated the pairing of Lourdes Domínguez Lino and Monica Niculescu. In the quarterfinals, they beat Līga Dekmeijere and Christina McHale. They were supposed to face Polona Hercog and Lisa Raymond in the semifinals but the other pair were forced to withdraw. So they entered the final in Luxembourg, and faced Kristina Barrois and Laura Thorpe, winning in two sets.

=== 2015 ===
In April, Vogt played in Stuttgart, Germany but lost in the first round to Kateřina Siniaková. Playing doubles with Petra Martić, she reached the semifinals before she and Martic were beaten by Bethanie Mattek-Sands and Lucie Šafářová. In the first round, they beat the team of Martina Hingis and Sania Mirza.

In July, she bowed out in the semifinals of the German tournament in Versmold. She then bowed out in the first round of qualifying for Bad Gastein in Austria but won the doubles title there with Danka Kovinić.

=== 2016: Retirement ===
In January, she won the doubles tournament in Hong Kong, along with Viktorija Golubic. She then bowed out in the first qualifying round of the Australian Open as she lost to Arina Rodionova, in straight sets. In doubles, she and her partner, Maria Sanchez, got through to the main draw of the tournament where they beat Darija Jurak and Nicole Melichar, in three sets in the first round, making this Vogt's first victory in the final table of a Grand Slam championship. Vogt did bow out sharply, however, in the second round when she and Sanchez lost to Caroline Garcia and Kristina Mladenovic, 2–6, 1–6.

In August, Vogt participated in her second Olympics where she lost in the first round to Johanna Konta, in straight sets. Afterwards, she announced her retirement from professional tennis.

== WTA Tour finals ==
=== Doubles: 2 (2 titles) ===
Legend Grand Slam tournaments Premier M & Premier 5 Premier International (2–0)	Finals by surface Hard (1–0) Clay (1–0) Grass (0–0) Carpet (0–0)

Result	No.	Date	Tournament	Surface	Partner	Opponents	Score
Win	1.	20 October 2013	Luxembourg Open	Hard (i)	(Belgium) Yanina Wickmayer	(Germany) Kristina Barrois (France) Laura Thorpe	7–6^{(7–2)}, 6–4
Win	2.	26 July 2015	Gastein Ladies, Austria	Clay	(Montenegro) Danka Kovinić	(Czech Republic) Lucie Hradecká (Spain) Lara Arruabarrena	4–6, 6–4, [10–3]

== ITF Circuit finals ==
=== Singles: 19 (12 titles, 7 runner-ups) ===
Legend $100,000 tournaments $50,000 tournaments $25,000 tournaments $15,000 tournaments $10,000 tournaments	Finals by surface Hard (3–2) Clay (9–5)

Result	No.	Date	Tournament	Surface	Opponent	Score
Win	1.	24 June 2007	ITF Davos, Switzerland	Clay	(Australia) Jessica Moore	6–4, 4–6, 6–3
Loss	1.	19 August 2007	ITF Pesaro, Italy	Clay	(Slovenia) Polona Hercog	2–6, 6–2, 1–6
Loss	2.	28 October 2007	ITF Mexico City	Hard	(France) Olivia Sanchez	6–2, 2–6, 2–6
Loss	3.	16 February 2008	ITF Mallorca, Spain	Clay	(Slovenia) Polona Hercog	6–4, 1–6, 3–6
Win	2.	4 May 2008	Makarska Ladies Open, Croatia	Clay	(Russia) Anastasia Pivovarova	6–2, 6–3
Win	3.	29 May 2010	ITF Velenje, Slovenia	Clay	(Czech Republic) Pavla Šmídová	6–1, 6–2
Win	4.	31 October 2010	ITF Cairo, Egypt	Clay	(Slovenia) Maša Zec Peškirič	6–1, 6–3
Loss	4.	23 January 2011	Open Andrézieux-Bouthéon, France	Hard	(Germany) Mona Barthel	3–6, 6–3, 4–6
Loss	5.	10 July 2011	ITF Aschaffenburg, Germany	Clay	(Argentina) Florencia Molinero	6–7^{(6)}, 1–6
Win	5.	11 September 2011	ITF Alphen aan den Rijn, Netherlands	Clay	(Poland) Katarzyna Piter	6–2, 6–4
Loss	6.	18 September 2011	ITF Rotterdam, Netherlands	Clay	(Germany) Dinah Pfizenmaier	6–3, 1–6, 1–6
Loss	7.	3 November 2012	ITF Netanya, Israel	Hard	(Slovakia) Anna Karolína Schmiedlová	6–0, 3–6, 4–6
Win	6.	10 March 2013	ITF Sutton, United Kingdom	Hard (i)	(Germany) Carina Witthöft	3–6, 6–4, 6–3
Win	7.	17 March 2013	GB Pro-Series Bath, United Kingdom	Hard (i)	(Belgium) An-Sophie Mestach	7–6^{(3)}, 6–3
Win	8.	13 July 2013	Open de Biarritz, France	Clay	(Slovakia) Anna Karolína Schmiedlová	1–6, 6–3, 6–2
Win	9.	15 September 2013	Royal Cup, Montenegro	Clay	(Estonia) Anett Kontaveit	6–4, 6–3
Win	10.	16 February 2014	ITF São Paulo, Brazil	Clay	(Russia) Marina Melnikova	6–1, 6–4
Win	11.	14 November 2014	GB Pro-Series Bath, United Kingdom	Hard (i)	(Italy) Alberta Brianti	6–3, 7–6^{(3)}
Win	12.	6 June 2015	ITF Brescia, Italy	Clay	(Venezuela) Andrea Gámiz	7–6^{(3)}, 6–4

=== Doubles: 27 (11 titles, 16 runner-ups) ===
Legend $100,000 tournaments $75,000 tournaments $50,000 tournaments $25,000 tournaments $10,000 tournaments	Finals by surface Hard (2–3) Clay (9–12) Grass (0–1)

Result	No.	Date	Tournament	Surface	Partner	Opponents	Score
Win	1.	16 February 2008	ITF Mallorca, Spain	Clay	(Slovenia) Polona Hercog	(Spain) Leticia Costas (Spain) Maite Gabarrús-Alonso	7–6^{(2)}, 6–3
Loss	1.	19 April 2008	ITF Bari, Italy	Clay	(Slovenia) Polona Hercog	(Italy) Alberta Brianti (Italy) Anna Floris	3–6, 3–6
Win	2.	4 May 2008	Makarska Ladies Open, Croatia	Clay	(Slovenia) Polona Hercog	(Slovenia) Tadeja Majerič (Slovenia) Maša Zec Peškirič	7–5, 6–2
Loss	2.	11 April 2010	ITF Hvar, Croatia	Clay	(Netherlands) Leonie Mekel	(Netherlands) Marlot Meddens (Netherlands) Nicole Thyssen	4–6, 1–6
Loss	3.	31 October 2010	ITF Cairo, Egypt	Clay	(Slovenia) Maša Zec Peškirič	(Hungary) Réka Luca Jani (Czech Republic) Martina Kubičíková	7–6^{(4)}, 1–6, [9–11]
Loss	4.	3 July 2011	ITF Stuttgart, Germany	Clay	(Czech Republic) Hana Birnerová	(Croatia) Darija Jurak (France) Anaïs Laurendon	6–4, 1–6, [0–10]
Loss	5.	10 July 2011	ITF Aschaffenburg, Germany	Clay	(Czech Republic) Hana Birnerová	(Turkey) Pemra Özgen (Japan) Yurika Sema	4–6, 6–7^{(5)}
Loss	6.	23 October 2011	GB Pro-Series Glasgow, UK	Hard (i)	(Austria) Yvonne Meusburger	(Finland) Emma Laine (France) Kristina Mladenovic	2–6, 4–6
Win	3.	25 March 2012	GB Pro-Series Bath, UK	Hard (i)	(Germany) Tatjana Malek	(France) Julie Coin (United Kingdom) Melanie South	6–3, 3–6, [10–3]
Loss	7.	6 April 2012	ITF Tessenderlo, Belgium	Clay (i)	(Germany) Tatjana Malek	(Netherlands) Demi Schuurs (Ukraine) Maryna Zanevska	4–6, 3–6
Win	4.	15 July 2012	ITF Aschaffenburg, Germany	Clay	(Argentina) Florencia Molinero	(Denmark) Malou Ejdesgaard (Hungary) Réka Luca Jani	6–3, 7–6^{(2)}
Loss	8.	13 April 2013	ITF Edgbaston, UK	Hard (i)	(Netherlands) Richèl Hogenkamp	(Germany) Kristina Barrois (Croatia) Ana Vrljić	4–6, 6–7^{(2)}
Win	5.	4 May 2013	ITF Civitavecchia, Italy	Clay	(Czech Republic) Renata Voráčová	(Poland) Paula Kania (Poland) Magda Linette	6–3, 6–4
Loss	9.	30 June 2013	ITF Stuttgart, Germany	Clay	(Poland) Sandra Zaniewska	(Germany) Kristina Barrois (Germany) Laura Siegemund	6–7^{(1)}, 4–6
Win	6.	6 September 2013	Save Cup, Italy	Clay	(France) Laura Thorpe	(Czech Republic) Petra Krejsová (Czech Republic) Tereza Smitková	7–6^{(5)}, 7–5
Loss	10.	7 March 2014	ITF Campinas, Brazil	Clay	(France) Laura Thorpe	(Ukraine) Lyudmyla Kichenok (Russia) Alexandra Panova	1–6, 3–6
Win	7.	10 May 2014	Empire Slovak Open, Slovakia	Clay	(China) Zheng Saisai	(Russia) Margarita Gasparyan (Russia) Evgeniya Rodina	6–4, 6–2
Win	8.	31 May 2014	Grado Tennis Cup, Italy	Clay	(Paraguay) Verónica Cepede Royg	(Spain) Lara Arruabarrena (Argentina) Florencia Molinero	6–4, 6–2
Loss	11.	14 June 2014	Nottingham Challenge, UK	Grass	(Paraguay) Verónica Cepede Royg	(Australia) Jarmila Gajdošová (Australia) Arina Rodionova	6–7^{(0)}, 1–6
Loss	12.	5 July 2014	Reinert Open, Germany	Clay	(Paraguay) Verónica Cepede Royg	(Canada) Gabriela Dabrowski (Colombia) Mariana Duque Mariño	4–6, 2–6
Win	9.	11 July 2014	Open de Biarritz, France	Clay	(Argentina) Florencia Molinero	(Spain) Lourdes Domínguez Lino (Brazil) Teliana Pereira	6–2, 6–2
Win	10.	26 September 2014	Royal Cup, Montenegro	Clay	(Romania) Alexandra Cadanțu	(Switzerland) Xenia Knoll (Netherlands) Arantxa Rus	6–1, 3–6, [10–2]
Loss	13.	5 June 2015	Internazionali di Brescia, Italy	Clay	(Argentina) María Irigoyen	(Germany) Laura Siegemund (Czech Republic) Renata Voráčová	2–6, 1–6
Loss	14.	13 September 2015	Open de Biarritz, France	Clay	(Hungary) Réka Luca Jani	(Turkey) Başak Eraydın (Belarus) Lidziya Marozava	4–6, 4–6
Loss	15.	16 November 2015	Scottsdale Challenge, US	Hard	(Switzerland) Viktorija Golubic	(Israel) Julia Glushko (Sweden) Rebecca Peterson	6–4, 5–7, [6–10]
Win	11.	8 January 2016	ITF Hong Kong	Hard	(Switzerland) Viktorija Golubic	(Chinese Taipei) Hsu Ching-wen (Finland) Emma Laine	6–2, 1–6, [10–4]
Loss	16.	5 June 2016	Internazionali di Brescia, Italy	Clay	(Netherlands) Cindy Burger	(Italy) Deborah Chiesa (Italy) Martina Colmegna	3–6, 6–1, [10–12]

== Fed Cup ==
=== Singles (14–12) ===
Edition	Stage	Date	Location	Against	Surface	Opponent	W/L	Score
2006 Fed Cup; Europe/Africa Zone Group III	R/R	26 April 2006	Antalya, Turkey	(Bosnia and Herzegovina) Bosnia and Herzegovina	Clay	(Bosnia and Herzegovina) Mervana Jugić-Salkić	L	2–6, 4–6
2006 Fed Cup; Europe/Africa Zone Group III	R/R	27 April 2006	Antalya, Turkey	Namibia	Clay	(Namibia) Suzelle Davin	W	6–7^{(4)}, 6–2, 6–0
2006 Fed Cup; Europe/Africa Zone Group III	R/R	28 April 2006	Antalya, Turkey	Egypt	Clay	(Egypt) Nihal Tarek-Saleh	W	6–0, 6–0
2006 Fed Cup; Europe/Africa Zone Group III	R/R	29 April 2006	Antalya, Turkey	Botswana	Clay	(Botswana) Puleng Tlhophane	W	6–0, 6–0
2007 Fed Cup; Europe/Africa Zone Group III	R/R	23 April 2007	Phoenix, Mauritius	Turkey	Hard	(Turkey) İpek Şenoğlu	L	6–4, 2–6, 4–6
2007 Fed Cup; Europe/Africa Zone Group III	R/R	24 April 2007	Phoenix, Mauritius	Mauritius	Hard	(Mauritius) Marinne Giraud	W	6–4, 6–4
2007 Fed Cup; Europe/Africa Zone Group III	R/R	25 April 2007	Phoenix, Mauritius	Egypt	Hard	(Egypt) Magy Aziz	W	6–2, 6–1
2007 Fed Cup; Europe/Africa Zone Group III	R/R	26 April 2007	Phoenix, Mauritius	Azerbaijan	Hard	(Azerbaijan) Sevil Aliyeva	W	6–1, 6–1
2007 Fed Cup; Europe/Africa Zone Group III	R/R	28 April 2010	Yerevan, Armenia	Greece	Clay	(Greece) Eleni Daniilidou	L	6–4, 4–6, 6–7^{(1)}
2007 Fed Cup; Europe/Africa Zone Group III	R/R	30 April 2010	Yerevan, Armenia	Luxembourg	Clay	(Luxembourg) Mandy Minella	L	4–6, 4–6
2007 Fed Cup; Europe/Africa Zone Group III	R/R	30 April 2010	Yerevan, Armenia	South Africa	Clay	(South Africa) Chanel Simmonds	W	7–5, 6–1
2007 Fed Cup; Europe/Africa Zone Group III	P/O	1 May 2010	Yerevan, Armenia	Norway	Clay	(Norway) Ulrikke Eikeri	W	6–4, 7–5
2013 Fed Cup; Europe/Africa Zone Group III	R/R	8 May 2013	Chișinău, Moldova	Madagascar	Clay	(Madagascar) Nantenaina Ramalalaharivololona	W	6–0, 6–2
2013 Fed Cup; Europe/Africa Zone Group III	R/R	9 May 2013	Chișinău, Moldova	Norway	Clay	(Norway) Heda Odegaard	W	6–1, 7–6^{(3)}
2013 Fed Cup; Europe/Africa Zone Group III	P/O	11 May 2013	Chișinău, Moldova	Denmark	Clay	(Denmark) Mai Grage	L	3–6, 1–6
2014 Fed Cup; Europe/Africa Zone Group II	R/R	16 April 2014	Šiauliai, Lithuania	Montenegro	Hard (i)	(Montenegro) Tamara Bojanić	W	6–0, 6–1
2014 Fed Cup; Europe/Africa Zone Group II	R/R	17 April 2014	Šiauliai, Lithuania	Lithuania	Hard (i)	(Lithuania) Lina Stančiūtė	L	7–6^{(7)}, 2–6, 4–6
2014 Fed Cup; Europe/Africa Zone Group II	R/R	18 April 2014	Šiauliai, Lithuania	Finland	Hard (i)	(Finland) Piia Suomalainen	W	6–2, 3–6, 6–1
2014 Fed Cup; Europe/Africa Zone Group II	P/O	19 April 2014	Šiauliai, Lithuania	Bosnia and Herzegovina	Hard (i)	(Bosnia and Herzegovina) Jasmina Tinjić	W	6–3, 6–1
2015 Fed Cup; Europe/Africa Zone Group I	R/R	4 February 2015	Budapest, Hungary	(United Kingdom) Great Britain	Hard (i)	(United Kingdom) Heather Watson	L	2–6, 3–6
2015 Fed Cup; Europe/Africa Zone Group I	R/R	5 February 2015	Budapest, Hungary	Ukraine	Hard (i)	(Ukraine) Elina Svitolina	L	6–4, 2–6, 3–6
2015 Fed Cup; Europe/Africa Zone Group I	R/R	6 February 2015	Budapest, Hungary	Turkey	Hard (i)	(Turkey) Çağla Büyükakçay	L	2–6, 2–6
2015 Fed Cup; Europe/Africa Zone Group I	P/O	7 February 2015	Budapest, Hungary	Portugal	Hard (i)	(Portugal) Michelle Larcher de Brito	L	6–7^{(5)}, 5–7
2016 Fed Cup; Europe/Africa Zone Group II	R/R	13 April 2016	Cairo, Egypt	Bosnia and Herzegovina	Clay	(Bosnia and Herzegovina) Dea Herdželaš	L	5–7, 6–2, 4–6
2016 Fed Cup; Europe/Africa Zone Group II	R/R	14 April 2016	Cairo, Egypt	Austria	Clay	(Austria) Tamira Paszek	W	2–6, 6–1, 6–3
2016 Fed Cup; Europe/Africa Zone Group II	R/R	15 April 2016	Cairo, Egypt	Egypt	Clay	(Egypt) Sandra Samir	L	2–6, 6–3, 1–6

=== Doubles (10–6) ===
Edition	Stage	Date	Location	Against	Surface	Partner	Opponents	W/L	Score
2006 Fed Cup; Europe/Africa Zone Group III	R/R	28 April 2006	Antalya	Egypt	Clay	(Liechtenstein) Sidonia Wolfinger	(Egypt) Magy Aziz (Egypt) Nihal Tarek-Saleh	L	2–6, 2–6
2007 Fed Cup; Europe/Africa Zone Group III	R/R	23 April 2007	Phoenix	Turkey	Hard	(Liechtenstein) Marina Novak	(Turkey) Pemra Özgen (Turkey) İpek Şenoğlu	L	0–6, 1–6
2007 Fed Cup; Europe/Africa Zone Group III	R/R	24 April 2007	Phoenix	Mauritius	Hard	(Liechtenstein) Marina Novak	(Mauritius) Marinne Giraud (Mauritius) Astrid Tixier	W	7–6^{(3)}, 7–6^{(6)}
2007 Fed Cup; Europe/Africa Zone Group III	R/R	25 April 2007	Phoenix	Egypt	Hard	(Liechtenstein) Sidonia Wolfinger	(Egypt) Aliaa Fakhry (Egypt) Nihal Tarek-Saleh	L	3–6, 6–4, 2–6
2007 Fed Cup; Europe/Africa Zone Group III	R/R	26 April 2007	Phoenix	Azerbaijan	Hard	(Liechtenstein) Marina Novak	(Azerbaijan) Sevil Aliyeva (Azerbaijan) Sayyara Mammadova	W	w/o
2010 Fed Cup; Europe/Africa Zone Group II	R/R	28 April 2010	Yerevan	Greece	Clay	(Liechtenstein) Marina Novak	(Greece) Eirini Georgatou (Greece) Despina Papamichail	L	3–6, 6–4, [9–11]
2013 Fed Cup; Europe/Africa Zone Group III	R/R	8 May 2013	Chișinău	Madagascar	Clay	(Liechtenstein) Kathinka von Deichmann	(Madagascar) Hariniony Andriamananarivo (Madagascar) Nantenaina Ramalalaharivololona	W	6–3, 6–4
2013 Fed Cup; Europe/Africa Zone Group III	R/R	9 May 2013	Chișinău	Norway	Clay	(Liechtenstein) Kathinka von Deichmann	(Norway) Andrea Raaholdt (Norway) Melanie Stokke	W	6–0, 6–0
2013 Fed Cup; Europe/Africa Zone Group III	P/O	11 May 2013	Chișinău	Denmark	Clay	(Liechtenstein) Kathinka von Deichmann	(Denmark) Malou Ejdesgaard (Denmark) Mai Grage	W	6–3, 6–2
2014 Fed Cup; Europe/Africa Zone Group II	R/R	16 April 2014	Šiauliai	Montenegro	Hard (i)	(Liechtenstein) Kathinka von Deichmann	(Montenegro) Tamara Bojanić (Montenegro) Nikoleta Bulatović	W	6–0, 6–1
2014 Fed Cup; Europe/Africa Zone Group II	R/R	17 April 2014	Šiauliai	Lithuania	Hard (i)	(Liechtenstein) Kathinka von Deichmann	(Lithuania) Justina Mikulskytė (Lithuania) Akvilė Paražinskaitė	W	6–1, 6–4
2014 Fed Cup; Europe/Africa Zone Group II	R/R	18 April 2014	Šiauliai	Finland	Hard (i)	(Liechtenstein) Kathinka von Deichmann	(Finland) Emma Laine (Finland) Piia Suomalainen	W	6–3, 7–5
2015 Fed Cup; Europe/Africa Zone Group I	R/R	4 February 2015	Budapest	(United Kingdom) Great Britain	Hard (i)	(Liechtenstein) Kathinka von Deichmann	(United Kingdom) Jocelyn Rae (United Kingdom) Anna Smith	L	1–6, 2–6
2016 Fed Cup; Europe/Africa Zone Group II	R/R	13 April 2016	Cairo	Bosnia and Herzegovina	Clay	(Liechtenstein) Kathinka von Deichmann	(Bosnia and Herzegovina) Ema Burgić Bucko (Bosnia and Herzegovina) Anita Husarić	W	7–6^{(9)}, 6–4
2016 Fed Cup; Europe/Africa Zone Group II	R/R	14 April 2016	Cairo	Austria	Clay	(Liechtenstein) Kathinka von Deichmann	(Austria) Julia Grabher (Austria) Sandra Klemenschits	W	7–5, 6–7^{(5)}, 6–4
2016 Fed Cup; Europe/Africa Zone Group II	R/R	15 April 2016	Cairo	Egypt	Clay	(Liechtenstein) Kathinka von Deichmann	(Egypt) Laila Elnimr (Egypt) Sandra Samir	L	0–6, 6–7^{(3)}

Olympic Games
Preceded by Marcel Tschopp	Flagbearer for Liechtenstein; London 2012	Succeeded by Julia Hassler
