= Tennis at the 2011 Games of the Small States of Europe – Mixed doubles =

Mixed doubles
- Tennis at the 2011 Games of the Small States of Europe

Final
- Champions: (Liechtenstein) Stephanie Vogt; (Liechtenstein) Jirka Lokaj
- Runners-up: (Luxembourg) Claudine Schaul; (Luxembourg) Mike Vermeer
- Score: 6–2, 6–1

Events
Singles	men	women
Doubles	men	women	mixed
← 2007 ·	Games of the Small States of Europe	· 2015 →

Stephanie Vogt and Jirka Lokaj won in the final 6–2, 6–1 in the final against Claudine Schaul and Mike Vermeer.

== Seeds ==
1. (Liechtenstein) Stephanie Vogt / Jirka Lokaj (champions)
2. (Luxembourg) Claudine Schaul / Mike Vermeer (final)

== Draw ==
=== Key ===
- Q = Qualifier
- WC = Wild card
- LL = Lucky loser
- Alt = Alternate
- SE = Special exempt
- PR = Protected ranking
- ITF = ITF entry
- JE = Junior exempt
- w/o = Walkover
- r = Retired
- d = Defaulted
- SR = Special ranking

First round
(Cyprus) I-N Savva (Cyprus) F Tsangaridis	6	6
(Andorra) AC Aguareles Loan (Andorra) JP Pous Gautier	1	2
(Monaco) L-A Gambarini (Monaco) B Balleret	7^{7}	6
(Malta) K Cassar (Liechtenstein) M Asciak	6^{5}	4
(Iceland) I Staub (Iceland) A Sigurdsson	4	6	[4]
2	(Luxembourg) C Schaul (Luxembourg) M Vermeer	6	3	[10]

Semifinals
1	(Liechtenstein) S Vogt (Liechtenstein) J Lokaj	6	6
(Cyprus) I-N Savva (Cyprus) F Tsangaridis	1	1
(Monaco) L-A Gambarini (Monaco) B Balleret	2	7^{7}	[0]
2	(Luxembourg) C Schaul (Luxembourg) M Vermeer	6	6^{3}	[10]

Final
1	(Liechtenstein) S Vogt (Liechtenstein) J Lokaj	6	6
2	(Luxembourg) C Schaul (Luxembourg) M Vermeer	2	1
