= Tennis at the 2011 Games of the Small States of Europe – Women's singles =

Women's singles
- Tennis at the 2011 Games of the Small States of Europe

Final
- Champion: (Liechtenstein) Stephanie Vogt
- Runner-up: (Liechtenstein) Kathinka von Deichmann
- Score: 6–4, 6–1

Events
Singles	men	women
Doubles	men	women	mixed
← 2009 ·	Games of the Small States of Europe	· 2013 →

Mandy Minella was the defending champion but decided not to participate.

Stephanie Vogt won in the final 6–4, 6–1 against Kathinka von Deichmann.

== Seeds ==
1. (Liechtenstein) Stephanie Vogt (champions)
2. (Malta) Kimberley Cassar (quarterfinals)
3. (Luxembourg) Claudine Schaul (semifinals)
4. (Liechtenstein) Kathinka von Deichmann (final)

== Draw ==
=== Key ===
- Q = Qualifier
- WC = Wild card
- LL = Lucky loser
- Alt = Alternate
- SE = Special exempt
- PR = Protected ranking
- ITF = ITF entry
- JE = Junior exempt
- w/o = Walkover
- r = Retired
- d = Defaulted
- SR = Special ranking

First round
(Iceland) I Staub	1	1
(Malta) E Jetcheva	6	6
3	(Luxembourg) C Schaul	6	3	6
(Cyprus) I-N Savva	2	6	3
(Monaco) K Brett	3	6	6
(Andorra) AN Aguareles Loan	6	3	2
(Iceland) S Kristjansdottir	1	0
(Monaco) L-A Gambarini	6	6
(Andorra) B Juncosa Lluis	0	3
(Cyprus) M Argyriou	6	6

Quarterfinals
1	(Liechtenstein) S Vogt	6	6
(Malta) E Jetcheva	3	3
3	(Luxembourg) C Schaul	6	6
(Monaco) K Brett	0	0
(Monaco) L-A Gambarini	0	5
4	(Liechtenstein) K von Deichmann	6	7
(Cyprus) M Argyriou	6	6
2	(Malta) K Cassar	4	2

Semifinals
1	(Liechtenstein) S Vogt	6	6
3	(Luxembourg) C Schaul	4	3
4	(Liechtenstein) K von Deichmann	6	6
(Cyprus) M Argyriou	2	0

Final
1	(Liechtenstein) S Vogt	6	6
4	(Liechtenstein) K von Deichmann	4	1
