= 2006 Fed Cup Europe/Africa Zone Group III – Pool B =

International tennis competition

Group B of the 2006 Fed Cup Europe/Africa Zone Group III was one of two pools in the Europe/Africa zone of the 2006 Fed Cup, an international women's tennis competition. Six teams competed in a round-robin competition. The top team, Bosnia and Herzegovina, thereby qualified for entry to Group II of the Europe/Africa_Zone for 2007.

		(Bosnia and Herzegovina) BIH	(Egypt) EGY	(Botswana) BOT	(Namibia) NAM	(Liechtenstein) LIE	(Azerbaijan) AZE	Match; W–L	Set; W–L	Game; W–L	Standings
66	Bosnia and Herzegovina		2–0	3–0	3–0	2–0	2–0	5–0	24–1	144–34	1
68	Egypt	0–2		3–0	2–0	2–1	2–0	4–1	18–7	123–74	2
75	Botswana	0–3	0–3		0–2	0–2	0–2	0–5	0–24	22–144	6
76	Namibia	0–3	0–2	2–0		0–2	2–1	2–3	10–17	94–127	4
	Liechtenstein	0–2	1–2	2–0	2–0		2–0	3–2	12–9	102–76	3
	Azerbaijan	0–2	0–2	2–0	1–2	0–2		1–4	8–14	81–110	5

== Bosnia and Herzegovina vs. Liechtenstein ==
Bosnia and Herzegovina
2
Club Ali Bey, Manavgat, Antalya, Turkey
26 April 2006
Red clay (outdoors)

Liechtenstein
0

			1	2	3
1	(Bosnia and Herzegovina) (Liechtenstein)	Dijana Stojić; Marina Novak	6; 3	6; 1
2	(Bosnia and Herzegovina) (Liechtenstein)	Mervana Jugić-Salkić; Stephanie Vogt	6; 2	6; 4
3	(Bosnia and Herzegovina) (Liechtenstein)					not played

== Bosnia and Herzegovina vs. Azerbaijan ==
Bosnia and Herzegovina
2
Club Ali Bey, Manavgat, Antalya, Turkey
26 April 2006
Red clay (outdoors)

Azerbaijan
0

			1	2	3
1	(Bosnia and Herzegovina) (Azerbaijan)	Dijana Stojić; Sevil Aliyeva	6; 0	6; 0
2	(Bosnia and Herzegovina) (Azerbaijan)	Mervana Jugić-Salkić; Elina Gasanova	6; 2	6; 3
3	(Bosnia and Herzegovina) (Azerbaijan)					not played

== Egypt vs. Botswana ==
Egypt
3
Club Ali Bey, Manavgat, Antalya, Turkey
26 April 2006
Red clay (outdoors)

Botswana
0

			1	2	3
1	(Egypt) (Botswana)	Magy Aziz; Laone Botshoma	6; 0	6; 1
2	(Egypt) (Botswana)	Nihal Tarek-Saleh; Puleng Tlhophane	6; 1	6; 1
3	(Egypt) (Botswana)	Menna El Nagdy / Aliaa Fakhry; Tshidiso Mosinyi / Lesedi Ramocha	6; 0	6; 1

== Namibia vs. Azerbaijan ==
Namibia
2
Club Ali Bey, Manavgat, Antalya, Turkey
26 April 2006
Red clay (outdoors)

Azerbaijan
1

			1	2	3
1	(Namibia) (Azerbaijan)	Elrien De Villiers; Sevil Aliyeva	4; 6	6; 1	6; 1
2	(Namibia) (Azerbaijan)	Suzelle Davin; Elina Gasanova	2; 6	1; 6
3	(Namibia) (Azerbaijan)	Suzelle Davin / Elrien De Villiers; Sevil Aliyeva / Elina Gasanova	7; 5	6; 3

== Bosnia and Herzegovina vs. Botswana ==
Bosnia and Herzegovina
3
Club Ali Bey, Manavgat, Antalya, Turkey
27 April 2006
Red clay (outdoors)

Botswana
0

			1	2	3
1	(Bosnia and Herzegovina) (Botswana)	Dijana Stojić; Laone Botshoma	6; 1	6; 0
2	(Bosnia and Herzegovina) (Botswana)	Mervana Jugić-Salkić; Puleng Tlhophane	6; 0	6; 0
3	(Bosnia and Herzegovina) (Botswana)	Selma Babić / Nadina Šećerbegović; Laone Botshoma / Tshidiso Mosinyi	6; 0	6; 2

== Egypt vs. Namibia ==
Egypt
2
Club Ali Bey, Manavgat, Antalya, Turkey
27 April 2006
Red clay (outdoors)

Namibia
0

			1	2	3
1	(Egypt) (Namibia)	Aliaa Fakhry; Elrien De Villiers	6; 4	6; 4
2	(Egypt) (Namibia)	Magy Aziz; Suzelle Davin	6; 2	6; 1
3	(Egypt) (Namibia)					not played

== Egypt vs. Azerbaijan ==
Egypt
2
Club Ali Bey, Manavgat, Antalya, Turkey
27 April 2006
Red clay (outdoors)

Azerbaijan
0

			1	2	3
1	(Egypt) (Azerbaijan)	Magy Aziz; Sevil Aliyeva	6; 2	6; 1
2	(Egypt) (Azerbaijan)	Nihal Tarek-Saleh; Elina Gasanova	6^{8} 7^{10}	6; 2	7; 5
3	(Egypt) (Azerbaijan)					not played

== Namibia vs. Liechtenstein ==
Namibia
0
Club Ali Bey, Manavgat, Antalya, Turkey
27 April 2006
Red clay (outdoors)

Liechtenstein
2

			1	2	3
1	(Namibia) (Liechtenstein)	Elrien De Villiers; Marina Novak	3; 6	6; 4	4; 6
2	(Namibia) (Liechtenstein)	Suzelle Davin; Stephanie Vogt	7^{7} 6^{4}	2; 6	0; 6
3	(Namibia) (Liechtenstein)					not played

== Bosnia and Herzegovina vs. Namibia ==
Bosnia and Herzegovina
3
Club Ali Bey, Manavgat, Antalya, Turkey
28 April 2006
Red clay (outdoors)

Namibia
0

			1	2	3
1	(Bosnia and Herzegovina) (Namibia)	Dijana Stojić; Elrien De Villiers	6; 0	6; 2
2	(Bosnia and Herzegovina) (Namibia)	Mervana Jugić-Salkić; Suzelle Davin	6; 0	6; 2
3	(Bosnia and Herzegovina) (Namibia)	Selma Babić / Nadina Šećerbegović; Elrien De Villiers / Rieke Honiball	6; 1	6; 0

== Egypt vs. Liechtenstein ==
Egypt
2
Club Ali Bey, Manavgat, Antalya, Turkey
28 April 2006
Red clay (outdoors)

Liechtenstein
1

			1	2	3
1	(Egypt) (Liechtenstein)	Magy Aziz; Marina Novak	6; 2	3; 0		retired
2	(Egypt) (Liechtenstein)	Nihal Tarek-Saleh; Stephanie Vogt	0; 6	0; 6
3	(Egypt) (Liechtenstein)	Magy Aziz / Nihal Tarek-Saleh; Stephanie Vogt / Sidonia Wolfinger	6; 2	6; 2

== Botswana vs. Azerbaijan ==
Botswana
0
Club Ali Bey, Manavgat, Antalya, Turkey
28 April 2006
Red clay (outdoors)

Azerbaijan
2

			1	2	3
1	(Botswana) (Azerbaijan)	Tshidiso Mosinyi; Sevil Aliyeva	0; 6	4; 6
2	(Botswana) (Azerbaijan)	Puleng Tlhophane; Elina Gasanova	3; 6	0; 6
3	(Botswana) (Azerbaijan)					not played

== Bosnia and Herzegovina vs. Egypt ==
Bosnia and Herzegovina
2
Club Ali Bey, Manavgat, Antalya, Turkey
29 April 2006
Red clay (outdoors)

Egypt
0

			1	2	3
1	(Bosnia and Herzegovina) (Egypt)	Dijana Stojić; Magy Aziz	6; 3	0; 6	6; 2
2	(Bosnia and Herzegovina) (Egypt)	Mervana Jugić-Salkić; Nihal Tarek-Saleh	6; 0	6; 0
3	(Bosnia and Herzegovina) (Egypt)					not played

== Botswana vs. Namibia ==
Botswana
0
Club Ali Bey, Manavgat, Antalya, Turkey
29 April 2006
Red clay (outdoors)

Namibia
2

			1	2	3
1	(Botswana) (Namibia)	Laone Botshoma; Elrien De Villiers	3; 6	0; 6
2	(Botswana) (Namibia)	Puleng Tlhophane; Suzelle Davin	1; 6	1; 6
3	(Botswana) (Namibia)					not played

== Botswana vs. Liechtenstein ==
Botswana
0
Club Ali Bey, Manavgat, Antalya, Turkey
29 April 2006
Red clay (outdoors)

Liechtenstein
2

			1	2	3
1	(Botswana) (Liechtenstein)	Tshidiso Mosinyi; Sidonia Wolfinger	3; 6	0; 6
2	(Botswana) (Liechtenstein)	Puleng Tlhophane; Stephanie Vogt	0; 6	0; 6
3	(Botswana) (Liechtenstein)					not played

== Liechtenstein vs. Azerbaijan ==
Liechtenstein
2
Club Ali Bey, Manavgat, Antalya, Turkey
29 April 2006
Red clay (outdoors)

Azerbaijan
0

			1	2	3
1	(Liechtenstein) (Azerbaijan)	Marina Novak; Sevil Aliyeva	6; 4	6; 2
2	(Liechtenstein) (Azerbaijan)	Sidonia Wolfinger; Elina Gasanova	4; 0			retired
3	(Liechtenstein) (Azerbaijan)					not played

- Bosnia and Herzegovina placed first in this group and thus advanced to Group II for 2007, where they placed fifth overall.

== See also ==
- Fed Cup structure
