= 2010 Fed Cup Europe/Africa Zone Group II – play-offs =

International tennis competition play-offs

The play-offs of the 2010 Fed Cup Europe/Africa Zone Group II were the final stages of the Group I Zonal Competition involving teams from Europe and Africa. Using the positions determined in their pools, the sixteen teams faced off to determine their placing in the 2005 Fed Cup Europe/Africa Zone Group II. The top two teams advanced to Group I, and the bottom two teams were relegated down to the Group III for the next year.

Placing	Pool A	Pool B
1	Greece	Finland
2	Luxembourg	Georgia
3	South Africa	Norway
4	Liechtenstein	Armenia

== Promotion play-offs ==
The top two teams of each pool were placed against each other in two head-to-head rounds. The winner of the rounds advanced to Group I for next year.

=== Greece vs. Georgia ===
Greece
2
Orange Fitness & Tennis Club, Yerevan, Armenia
1 May 2010
Red clay (outdoors)

Georgia
0

			1	2	3
1	(Greece) (Georgia (country))	Anna Gerasimou; Sofia Shapatava	6; 4	6; 3
2	(Greece) (Georgia (country))	Eleni Daniilidou; Anna Tatishvili	2; 6	7^{7} 6^{2}	6; 2
3	(Greece) (Georgia (country))					not played

=== Luxembourg vs. Finland ===
Luxembourg
2
Orange Fitness & Tennis Club, Yerevan, Armenia
1 May 2010
Red clay (outdoors)

Finland
1

			1	2	3
1	(Luxembourg) (Finland)	Anne Kremer; Piia Suomalainen	3; 6	2; 6
2	(Luxembourg) (Finland)	Mandy Minella; Emma Laine	3; 6	7^{7} 6^{5}	6; 1
3	(Luxembourg) (Finland)	Anne Kremer / Mandy Minella; Emma Laine / Piia Suomalainen	2; 6	6; 3	[10] [6]

== Relegation play-offs ==
The last placed teams of each pool were placed against each other in two ties. The losing team of the rounds were relegated to Group III for next year.

=== South Africa vs. Armenia ===
South Africa
1
Orange Fitness & Tennis Club, Yerevan, Armenia
1 May 2010
Red clay (outdoors)

Armenia
2

			1	2	3
1	(South Africa) (Armenia)	Christi Potgieter; Anna Movsisyan	7; 5	6^{5} 7^{7}	3; 6
2	(South Africa) (Armenia)	Chanel Simmonds; Ani Amiraghyan	6; 4	6; 4
3	(South Africa) (Armenia)	Christi Potgieter / Chanel Simmonds; Anna Movsisyan / Liudmila Nikoyan	3; 6	6; 1	[8] [10]

=== Liechtenstein vs. Norway ===
Liechtenstein
2
Orange Fitness & Tennis Club, Yerevan, Armenia
1 May 2010
Red clay (outdoors)

Norway
0

			1	2	3
1	(Liechtenstein) (Norway)	Marina Novak; Emma Flood	7^{7} 6^{2}	6; 1
2	(Liechtenstein) (Norway)	Stephanie Vogt; Ulrikke Eikeri	6; 4	7; 5
3	(Liechtenstein) (Norway)					not played

== Final Placements ==
Placing	Teams	
Promoted	Greece	Luxembourg
Third	Georgia	Finland
Fifth	Armenia	Liechtenstein
Relegated	South Africa	Norway

- Greece and Luxembourg advanced to the Europe/Africa Zone Group I for the next year. The Greeks placed fourth in their pool, but won their relegation play-off, meaning they remained in Group I for 2012. The Luxembourgians, however, placed third in their pool, and ended up placing eleventh overall.
- South Africa and Norway were relegated down to Europe/Africa Zone Group III for the next year. The South Africans placed first in their pool, and won their promotional play-off, meaning they advanced to Group I for 2012. The Norwegians, however, placed third in their pool and ended up placing fifth overall.

== See also ==
- Fed Cup structure
