= Thomas Oger =

Monegasque tennis player (born 1980)

- Country (sports): Monaco
- Born: 22 March 1980 (age 45)
- Retired: 2013
- Plays: Ambidextrous
- Prize money: US$116,051

Singles
- Career record: 5–3
- Highest ranking: No. 249 (29 October 2007)

Grand Slam singles results
- Australian Open: Q2 (2008)
- French Open: Q2 (2007)
- Wimbledon: Q2 (2008)
- US Open: DNP

Doubles
- Career record: 4–4
- Highest ranking: No. 138 (9 July 2007)
Medal record
Representing Monaco
Games of the Small States of Europe
| Gold medal – first place | 2011 Liechtenstein | Doubles |
| Gold medal – first place | 2013 Luxembourg | Singles |
| Gold medal – first place | 2013 Luxembourg | Doubles |
| Gold medal – first place | 2015 Iceland | Doubles |
| Silver medal – second place | 2017 San Marino | Doubles |
- Last updated on: 11 June 2025.

Thomas Oger (born 22 March 1980) is a Monegasque former professional tennis player.

Oger reached his highest individual ranking on the ATP Tour on October 29, 2007, when he became World number 249. He primarily played on the Futures circuit and the Challenger circuit. Oger joined the Monegasque Davis Cup team in 2010, having posted a 3–3 record in singles and a 2–2 record in doubles in six ties played.

== Tour singles finals – all levels (8–9) ==
Legend (singles)
Grand Slam (0–0)
Tennis Masters Cup (0–0)
ATP Masters Series (0–0)
ATP Tour (0–0)
Challengers (0–0)
Futures (8–9)

| Outcome | No. | Date | Tournament | Surface | Opponent | Score |
|---|---|---|---|---|---|---|
| Winner | 1. | April 8, 2002 | Sutama, Japan | Grass | (Austria) Marco Mirnegg | 7–6, 6–3 |
| Runner-up | 1. | 21 July 2003 | Bucharest, Romania | Clay | (Romania) Răzvan Sabău | 4–6, 1–6 |
| Winner | 2. | 18 August 2003 | El Menzah, Tunisia | Hard | (Tunisia) Haithem Abid | 6–1, 6–0 |
| Winner | 3. | 27 February 2006 | Wrocław, Poland | Hard (i) | (Czech Republic) Lukáš Rosol | 6–3, 2–6, 7–6 |
| Runner-up | 2. | 5 June 2006 | Gausdal, Norway | Hard | (Norway) Stian Boretti | 4–6, 2–6 |
| Winner | 4. | 12 June 2006 | Gausdal, Norway | Hard | (Italy) Riccardo Ghedin | 6–1, 3–6, 6–3 |
| Winner | 5. | 8 January 2007 | Sheffield, U.K. | Hard (i) | (Finland) Timo Nieminen | 6–2, 6–4 |
| Runner-up | 3. | 15 January 2007 | Sunderland, U.K. | Hard (i) | (France) Stéphane Robert | 2–6, 5–7 |
| Runner-up | 4. | 26 March 2007 | Bath, U.K. | Hard (i) | (United Kingdom) Richard Bloomfield | 5–7, 6–7 |
| Runner-up | 5. | 2 April 2007 | Bath, U.K. | Hard (i) | (Germany) Andreas Beck | 5–7, 4–6 |
| Runner-up | 6. | 14 May 2007 | Meshref, Kuwait | Hard | (Pakistan) Aisam-ul-Haq Qureshi | 6–7, 6–3, 3–6 |
| Winner | 6. | 20 August 2007 | London, U.K. | Hard | (Netherlands) Fred Hemmes Jr. | 6–0, 7–6 |
| Winner | 7. | 17 September 2007 | Plaisir, France | Hard (i) | (France) Adrian Mannarino | 7–6, 7–5 |
| Runner-up | 7. | 4 February 2008 | Bressuire, France | Hard (i) | (France) Mathieu Rodrigues | 5–7, 0–6 |
| Runner-up | 8. | 28 August 2008 | Piombino, Italy | Clay | (Canada) Pierre-Ludovic Duclos | 3–6, 0–6 |
| Runner-up | 9. | 9 March 2009 | Lille, France | Hard (i) | (France) David Guez | 4–6, 5–7 |
| Winner | 8. | 20 April 2009 | Antalya, Turkey | Hard | (France) Grégoire Burquier | 7–6, 6–3 |
