= Petros Chrysochos =

Cypriot tennis player (born 1996)

- Country (sports): Cyprus
- Born: April 8, 1996 (age 29) Larnaca, Cyprus
- Height: 1.85 m (6 ft 1 in)
- Turned pro: 2019
- Plays: Right-handed (two-handed backhand)
- College: Wake Forest Demon Deacons
- Prize money: $75,970

Singles
- Career record: 5–9
- Career titles: 0
- Highest ranking: No. 354 (28 June 2021)

Grand Slam singles results
- Australian Open Junior: QF (2014)
- French Open Junior: 3R (2014)
- Wimbledon Junior: 2R (2014)
- US Open Junior: 2R (2014)

Doubles
- Career record: 2–2
- Career titles: 0
- Highest ranking: No. 464 (26 July 2021)

Grand Slam doubles results
- Australian Open Junior: 1R (2013, 2014)
- French Open Junior: 2R (2014)
- Wimbledon Junior: SF (2014)
- US Open Junior: 2R (2014)

Team competitions
- Davis Cup: 25–10
Medal record
Representing Cyprus
Games of the Small States of Europe
Silver medal – second place	2013 Luxembourg	Singles
Bronze medal – third place	2013 Luxembourg	Doubles
Gold medal – first place	2015 Iceland	Mixed Doubles
Silver medal – second place	2015 Iceland	Doubles
- Last updated on: 28 November 2025.

Petros Chrysochos (Greek: Πέτρος Χρυσοχός; born April 8, 1996) is a professional Cypriot tennis player and a member of Cyprus Davis Cup team.

He won his first professional ITF futures tournament in Sharm El Sheikh, Egypt without dropping a set which saw him debuting at 860 in the world on the professional ATP world rankings. Chrysochos was a member of the 2018 NCAA Men's Tennis Championship team at Wake Forest University, playing #2 in both the singles and doubles lineups. Chrysochos also won the 2018 NCAA Men's Tennis Singles Championship.

Chrysochos reached his highest combined ranking of 19 in the world on ITF junior circuit and a career high ATP ranking of No. 354 achieved on 28 June 2021 and a doubles ranking of No. 464 achieved on 26 July 2021. Chrysochos has a career high doubles ranking of 448 achieved in September 2020.

== Davis Cup ==
Chrysochos (Herodotou Tennis Academy) is a member of the Cyprus Davis Cup team, having posted a 25–10 record in singles and a 4–3 record in doubles in one tie played.

== ATP Challenger and ITF Futures/World Tennis Tour finals ==
=== Singles (9–5) ===
Legend (singles) ATP Challenger Tour (0–0) ITF Futures/World Tennis Tour (9–5)	Titles by surface Hard (7–4) Clay (2–1) Grass (0–0) Carpet (0–0)

Outcome	W–L	Date	Tournament	Tier	Surface	Opponent	Score
Winner	1–0	Apr 2014	F15 Sharm El Sheikh, Egypt	Futures	Clay	(Turkey) Cem İlkel	6–3, 6–3
Runner-up	1–1	Nov 2014	F2 Larnaca, Cyprus	Futures	Hard	(France) Laurent Lokoli	4–6, 0–6
Winner	2–1	Nov 2014	F3 Larnaca, Cyprus	Futures	Hard	(Italy) Erik Crepaldi	3–6, 7–6^{(10–8)}, 6–0
Winner	3–1	May 2015	F18 Sharm El Sheikh, Egypt	Futures	Clay	(Spain) Pablo Vivero González	6–3, 6–7^{(5–7)}, 6–0
Winner	4–1	Jun 2018	F13 Winston-Salem, USA	Futures	Hard	(United States) Michael Redlicki	6–2, 1–6, 6–4
Runner-up	4–2	Jul 2018	F20 Champaign, USA	Futures	Hard	(Tunisia) Aziz Dougaz	6–7^{(3–7)}, 4–6
Winner	5–2	Aug 2019	M25 Edwardsville, USA	World Tennis Tour	Hard	(United States) Nathan Ponwith	6–4, 2–6, 7–5
Winner	6–2	Oct 2019	M25 Monastir, Tunisia	World Tennis Tour	Hard	(France) Alexis Gautier	6–4, 3–6, 6–3
Runner-up	6–3	Oct 2019	M25 Monastir, Tunisia	World Tennis Tour	Hard	(France) Alexandre Muller	6–3, 6–7^{(7–5)}, 2–6
Winner	7–3	Mar 2020	M25 Las Vegas, USA	World Tennis Tour	Hard	(United States) Justin Butsch	6–2, 6–1
Runner-up	7–4	Nov 2020	M15 Sharm El Sheikh, Egypt	World Tennis Tour	Hard	(Italy) Alessandro Bega	4–6, 2–6
Winner	8–4	Nov 2020	M15 Sharm El Sheikh, Egypt	World Tennis Tour	Hard	(Ukraine) Vladyslav Orlov	6–3, 6–2
Winner	9–4	Apr 2021	M15 Sharm El Sheikh, Egypt	World Tennis Tour	Hard	(Italy) Mattia Bellucci	6–0, 6–2
Runner-up	9–5	May 2022	M15 Ulcinj, Montenegro	World Tennis Tour	Clay	(Italy) Marcello Serafini	1–6, 3–6

=== Doubles 9 (5–4) ===
Legend (singles) ATP Challenger Tour (0–1) ITF Futures/World Tennis Tour (5–3)	Titles by surface Hard (4–3) Clay (1–1) Grass (0–0) Carpet (0–0)

Outcome	W–L	Date	Tournament	Tier	Surface	Partner	Opponent	Score
Winner	1–0	Nov 2015	F1 Nicosia, Cyprus	Futures	Hard	(Croatia) Nino Serdarušić	(Belgium) Alexandre Folie (Slovakia) Adrian Sikora	6–3, 3–6, [11–9]
Winner	2–0	Nov 2015	F2 Limassol, Cyprus	Futures	Hard	(Croatia) Nino Serdarušić	(Spain) Andrés Artuñedo (Canada) Steven Diez	1–6, 6–4, [10–3]
Winner	3–0	Sep 2019	M25 Jounieh, Lebanon	World Tennis Tour	Clay	(Cyprus) Sergis Kyratzis	(Italy) Daniele Capecchi (Italy) Domenico Cutuli	6–3, 6–2
Winner	4–0	Oct 2019	M25 Monastir, Tunisia	World Tennis Tour	Hard	(Tunisia) Skander Mansouri	(France) Gabriel Petit (France) Hugo Pontico	7–5, 6–2
Loss	4–1	Nov 2020	M25 Sharm El Sheikh, Egypt	World Tennis Tour	Hard	(Italy) Alessandro Bega	(Serbia) Marko Miladinović (Serbia) Miljan Zekić	4–6, 3–6
Winner	5–1	May 2021	M15 Heraklion, Greece	World Tennis Tour	Hard	(United Kingdom) Mark Whitehouse	(China) Hua Runhao (China) Zhang Ze	4–6, 6–2, [10–6]
Loss	5–2	Jul 2021	Cary, USA	Challenger	Hard	(Greece) Michail Pervolarakis	(United States) Christian Harrison (United States) Dennis Novikov	3–6, 3–6
Loss	5–3	May 2022	M15 Ulcinj, Montenegro	World Tennis Tour	Clay	(Montenegro) Rrezart Cungu	(Italy) Marcello Serafini (Italy) Samuel Vincent Ruggeri	3–6, 4–6
Loss	5–4	Dec 2023	M15 Limassol, Cyprus	World Tennis Tour	Hard	(Cyprus) Sergis Kyratzis	(Cyprus) Menelaos Efstathiou (Cyprus) Eleftherios Neos	6–3, 0–6, [5–10]

Sporting positions
Preceded by (United States) Noah Rubin (Wake Forest)	ACC Freshman of the Year; 2016	Succeeded by (United States) William Blumberg (North Carolina)
