= Elina Gasanova =

Azerbaijani-born Russian tennis player

- Country (sports): Russia (2008–2010); Azerbaijan (2005–2007)
- Born: 21 July 1989 (age 35); Baku, Azerbaijan SSR
- Turned pro: 2005
- Retired: 2010
- Plays: Right-handed (two-handed backhand)
- Prize money: $22,097

Singles
- Career record: 68–71
- Career titles: 0
- Highest ranking: No. 581 (26 July 2010)

Doubles
- Career record: 62–59
- Career titles: 6 ITF
- Highest ranking: No. 362 (24 August 2009)

Elina Gasanova (Azerbaijani: Elina Həsənova; Russian: Элина Гасанова, born 21 July 1989) is a retired Azerbaijani-born Russian tennis player.

Gasanova won six doubles titles on the ITF Circuit in her career. On 26 July 2010, she reached her best singles ranking of world No. 581. On 24 August 2009, she peaked at No. 362 in the WTA doubles rankings.

Playing for Azerbaijan in Fed Cup competition, Gasanova has a win–loss record of 2–4.

She retired from professional tennis 2010.

== ITF finals ==
=== Singles: 1 (0–1) ===
Legend $100,000 tournaments $75,000 tournaments $50,000 tournaments $25,000 tournaments $10,000 tournaments	Finals by surface Hard (0–0) Clay (0–0) Grass (0–0) Carpet (0–1)

Result	Date	Tier	Tournament	Surface	Opponent	Score
Loss	13 October 2008	10,000	ITF Kharkiv, Ukraine	Carpet (i)	(Ukraine) Lesia Tsurenko	3–6, 1–6

=== Doubles: 11 (6–5) ===
Legend $100,000 tournaments $75,000 tournaments $50,000 tournaments $25,000 tournaments $10,000 tournaments	Finals by surface Hard (1–2) Clay (4–3) Grass (0–0) Carpet (1–0)

Result	Date	Tier	Tournament	Surface	Partner	Opponents	Score
Win	3 July 2006	10,000	ITF Zhukovsky, Russia	Clay	(Russia) Vasilisa Davydova	(Russia) Eugeniya Pashkova (Russia) Elizaveta Titova	6–3, 6–4
Loss	28 August 2006	10,000	ITF Baku, Azerbaijan	Clay	(Georgia (country)) Sofia Kvatsabaia	(Georgia (country)) Sofia Shapatava (Georgia (country)) Teona Tzertzvadze	4–6, 2–6
Win	20 March 2007	10,000	ITF Cairo, Egypt	Clay	(Russia) Galina Fokina	(Italy) Anna Floris (Italy) Valentina Sulpizio	7–5, 6–1
Loss	26 May 2008	10,000	ITF Bangkok, Thailand	Hard	(Indonesia) Lavinia Tananta	(Indonesia) Yayuk Basuki (Australia) Tiffany Welford	6–2, 6–7^{(7)}, [4–10]
Win	13 June 2008	10,000	ITF Gurgaon, India	Hard	(India) Isha Lakhani	(India) Ankita Bhambri (India) Sanaa Bhambri	6–3, 6–4
Loss	15 September 2008	10,000	ITF Limoges, France	Hard (i)	(Belarus) Volha Duko	(United Kingdom) Yasmin Clarke (United Kingdom) Olivia Scarfi	6–7^{(5)}, 7–5, [8–10]
Loss	6 July 2009	10,000	ITF Brussels, Belgium	Clay	(Russia) Vasilisa Davydova	(Czech Republic) Simona Dobrá (Czech Republic) Kateřina Vaňková	3–6, 4–6
Loss	29 March 2010	10,000	ITF Cairo, Egypt	Clay	(Russia) Galina Fokina	(Czech Republic) Iveta Gerlová (Czech Republic) Lucie Kriegsmannová	4–6, 3–6
Win	31 May 2010	10,000	ITF Cantanhede, Portugal	Carpet (i)	(Russia) Julia Parasyuk	(Russia) Daria Kirpicheva (Spain) Carolina Prats-Millan	7–6^{(0)}, 6–1
Win	28 June 2010	10,000	ITF Melilla, Spain	Clay	(Belgium) Gally De Wael	(Spain) Yvonne Cavallé Reimers (Russia) Margarita Lazareva	6–0, 6–0
Win	5 July 2009	10,000	ITF Brussels, Belgium	Clay	(Russia) Vasilisa Davydova	(Netherlands) Marcella Koek (Netherlands) Josanne van Bennekom	7–5, 6–2
