= Tiffany Cornelius =

Luxembourgish tennis player

- Country (sports): Luxembourg
- Born: 13 January 1989 (age 36)
- Plays: Right-handed (one-handed backhand)
- Prize money: $3,894

Singles
- Career record: 0–14
- Career titles: 0

Doubles
- Career record: 9–12
- Career titles: 0
- Highest ranking: 1155 (1 August 2011)

Team competitions
- Fed Cup: 1–9
Medal record
Representing Luxembourg
Games of the Small States of Europe
Bronze medal – third place	2013 Luxembourg	Singles
Bronze medal – third place	2013 Luxembourg	Mixed
- Last updated on: 8 February 2019.

Tiffany Cornelius (born 13 January 1989) is a Luxembourgish tennis player.

Cornelius has a career high WTA doubles ranking of 1155, achieved on 1 August 2011.

Cornelius represents Luxembourg in Fed Cup.
