= Claudine Schaul =

Luxembourgish tennis player

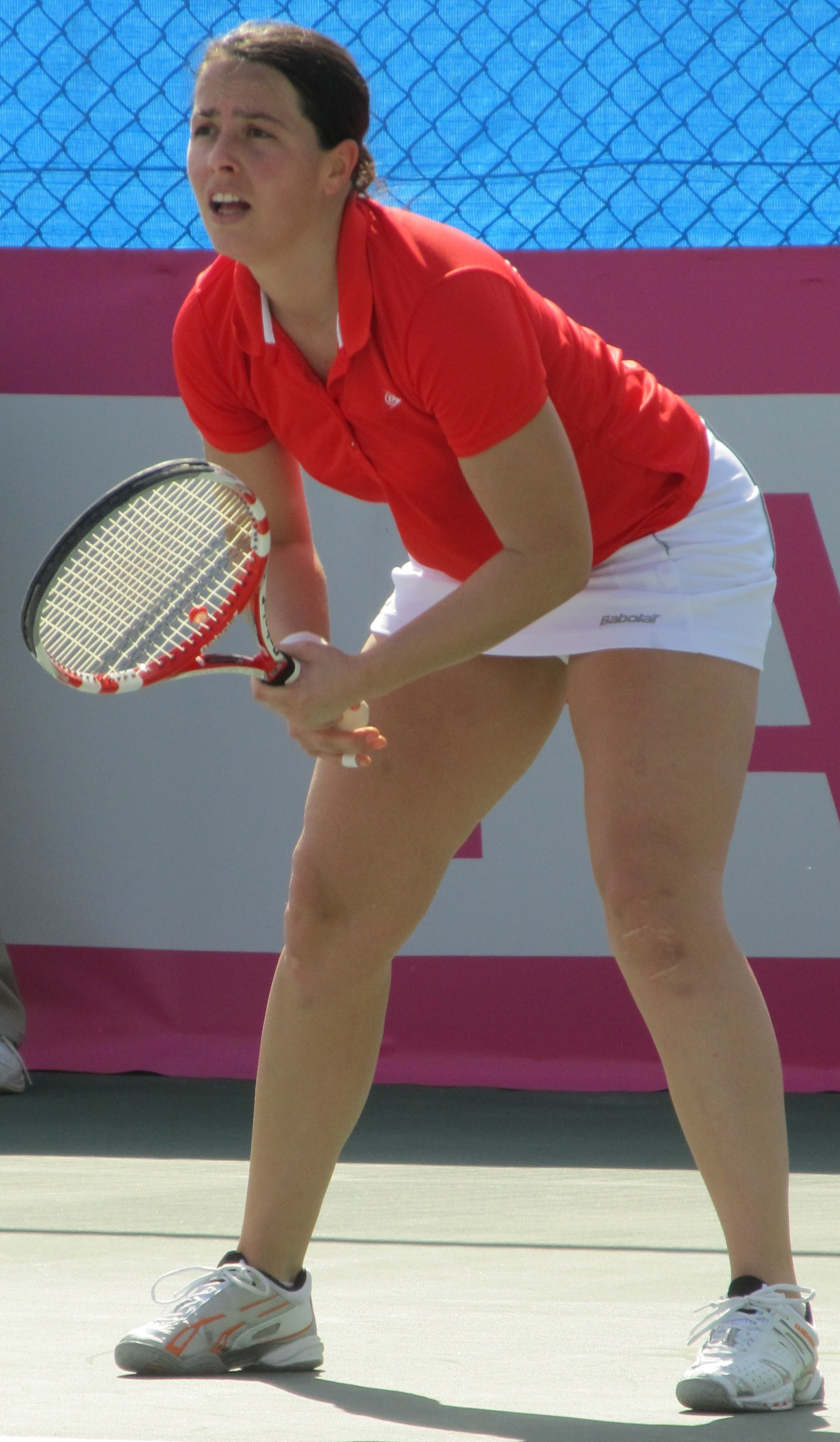
- Country (sports): Luxembourg
- Residence: Garnich
- Born: 20 August 1983 (age 42) Luxembourg City
- Height: 1.69 m (5 ft 7 in)
- Turned pro: 2002
- Plays: Right-handed (two-handed backhand)
- Prize money: US$ 542,184

Singles
- Career record: 304–293
- Career titles: 1 WTA, 4 ITF
- Highest ranking: No. 41 (24 May 2004)

Grand Slam singles results
- Australian Open: 3R (2004)
- French Open: 1R (2004, 2005)
- Wimbledon: 1R (2004, 2005)
- US Open: 3R (2003)

Doubles
- Career record: 81–110
- Career titles: 1 WTA, 3 ITF
- Highest ranking: No. 71 (8 November 2004)

Grand Slam doubles results
- Australian Open: 1R (2005)
- French Open: 1R (2004, 2005)
- US Open: 2R (2004)

Team competitions
- Fed Cup: 42–43
Medal record
Representing Luxembourg
Women's Tennis
Games of the Small States of Europe
Gold medal – first place	2003 Malta	Singles
Gold medal – first place	2003 Malta	Doubles
Silver medal – second place	2007 Monaco	Singles
Silver medal – second place	2009 Cyprus	Singles
Gold medal – first place	2009 Cyprus	Doubles
Bronze medal – third place	2011 Liechtenstein	Singles
Silver medal – second place	2011 Liechtenstein	Mixed doubles
Gold medal – first place	2015 Iceland	Doubles
Silver medal – second place	2015 Iceland	Mixed doubles

Claudine Schaul (born 20 August 1983) is a former tennis player from Luxembourg.

Her career-high rankings are world No. 41 in singles, which was achieved on 24 May 2004, and No. 71 for doubles, achieved on 8 November 2004.

Schaul first played for the Luxembourg Fed Cup team in 1998, where she has a win–loss record of 42–43.

== Career ==
Her father and brother are sports teachers and introduced her to tennis when she was four years old.

A year after turning pro, Schaul made it to the third round of the 2003 US Open, upsetting former No. 15 Anna Smashnova, 7–6^{(5)}, 6–2 in the first round.

In January 2004, Schaul won her first doubles title in Canberra, Australia, partnering Jelena Kostanić Tošić. Schaul then made it to the third round of the Australian Open.

In May 2004, she won her first WTA Tour title at Strasbourg, defeating Lindsay Davenport in the final, in three sets.

Due to her strong performances at the Australian Open and Strasbourg, Schaul was awarded the honour of being the flag bearer for Luxembourg at the opening ceremony of the Summer Olympics in Athens.

== WTA Tour finals ==
=== Singles: 1 (title) ===
Legend Grand Slam tournaments Premier M & Premier 5 Premier International (1–0)	Finals by surface Hard (0–0) Clay (1–0) Grass (0–0) Carpet (0–0)

Result	Date	Tournament	Surface	Opponent	Score
Win	May 2004	Internationaux de Strasbourg, France	Clay	(United States) Lindsay Davenport	2–6, 6–0, 6–3

=== Doubles: 3 (1 title, 2 runner-ups) ===
Legend Grand Slam tournaments Premier M & Premier 5 Premier (0–1) International (1–1)	Finals by surface Hard (1–1) Clay (0–0) Grass (0–1) Carpet (0–0)

Result	Date	Tournament	Surface	Partner	Opponents	Score
Win	Jan 2004	Canberra International, Australia	Hard	(Croatia) Jelena Kostanić	(France) Caroline Dhenin (Australia) Lisa McShea	6–4, 7–6^{(7–3)}
Loss	Jun 2004	Rosmalen Open, Netherlands	Grass	(Croatia) Jelena Kostanić	(Australia) Lisa McShea (Venezuela) Milagros Sequera	6–7^{(3–7)}, 3–6
Loss	Jul 2004	Stanford Classic, United States	Hard	(Czech Republic) Iveta Benešová	(Greece) Eleni Daniilidou (Australia) Nicole Pratt	2–6, 4–6

== ITF Circuit finals ==
Legend
$75,000 tournaments
$50,000 tournaments
$25,000 tournaments
$10,000 tournaments

=== Singles (4–6) ===
Result	No.	Date	Tournament	Surface	Opponent	Score
Loss	1.	13 August 2000	ITF Rebecq, Belgium	Clay	(Belgium) Caroline Maes	6–1, 6–7^{(6)}, 3–6
Loss	2.	12 November 2000	ITF Villenave-d'Ornon, France	Clay (i)	(Belgium) Caroline Maes	0–4, 1–4, 5–4, 1–4
Loss	3.	11 Feb 2001	ITF Redbridge, United Kingdom	Hard (i)	(Denmark) Eva Dyrberg	2–6, 2–6
Loss	4.	19 Mar 2002	ITF Cañada Flintridge, United States	Hard	(United States) Laura Granville	6–1, 2–6, 3–6
Win	1.	7 July 2002	ITF Stuttgart, Germany	Clay	(Germany) Stephanie Gehrlein	6–3, 3–6, 6–4
Win	2.	22 September 2002	ITF Luxembourg	Clay	(Italy) Nathalie Viérin	6–2, 4–6, 6–4
Loss	5.	15 June 2003	Open de Marseille, France	Clay	(Spain) Arantxa Parra Santonja	2–6, 1–6
Loss	6.	26 February 2006	ITF Saint Paul, United States	Hard (i)	(Venezuela) Milagros Sequera	1–6, 2–6
Win	3.	17 August 2008	ITF Koksijde, Belgium	Clay	(Netherlands) Daniëlle Harmsen	7–6^{(2)}, 7–6^{(7)}
Win	4.	25 January 2009	ITF Wrexham, United Kingdom	Hard (i)	(France) Constance Sibille	6–1, 3–6, 6–4

=== Doubles (3–4) ===
Result	No.	Date	Tournament	Surface	Partner	Opponents	Score
Win	1.	3 March 2002	ITF Buchen, Germany	Carpet (i)	(Sweden) Sofia Arvidsson	(Russia) Anna Bastrikova (Germany) Claudia Kardys	6–0, 7–5
Loss	1.	8 September 2002	ITF Denain, France	Clay	(Ukraine) Yuliya Beygelzimer	(Czech Republic) Olga Blahotová (Czech Republic) Gabriela Navrátilová	3–6, 0–6
Win	2.	2 February 2003	ITF Urtijëi, Italy	Carpet (i)	(Germany) Vanessa Henke	(Czech Republic) Olga Blahotová (Czech Republic) Gabriela Navrátilová	6–1, 6–2
Loss	2.	29 July 2006	ITF Pétange, Luxembourg	Clay	(Lithuania) Lina Stančiūtė	(Argentina) Erica Krauth (Portugal) Frederica Piedade	3–6, 3–6
Loss	3.	28 July 2007	ITF Pétange, Luxembourg	Clay	(Germany) Martina Müller	(Belarus) Anastasiya Yakimova (Spain) Carla Suárez Navarro	7–6^{(4)}, 1–6, 6–7^{(1)}
Loss	4.	3 August 2008	ITF Bad Saulgau, Germany	Clay	(Italy) Anna Floris	(Czech Republic) Simona Dobrá (Czech Republic) Tereza Hladíková	1–6, 6–4, [8–10]
Win	3.	17 January 2009	GB Pro-Series Glasgow, UK	Hard (i)	(Austria) Sandra Klemenschits	(Netherlands) Nicolette van Uitert (Belarus) Viktoria Yemialyanava	6–3, 4–6, [10–7]
