= Laura Correia =

Luxembourgish tennis player

- Country (sports): Luxembourg
- Residence: Bissen, Luxembourg
- Born: 29 November 1995 (age 30) Luxembourg City, Luxembourg
- Plays: Right-handed (two-handed backhand)
- Prize money: $628

Singles
- Career record: 0–3
- Career titles: 0

Doubles
- Career record: 0–0
- Career titles: 0

Team competitions
- Fed Cup: 0–4
Medal record
Representing Luxembourg
Games of the Small States of Europe
Bronze medal – third place	2013 Luxembourg	Singles
Bronze medal – third place	2013 Luxembourg	Doubles
- Last updated on: 8 February 2019.

Laura Correia (born 29 November 1995) is a Luxembourgish tennis player.

Correia represents Luxembourg in Fed Cup.
