= Tennis at the 2015 Games of the Small States of Europe =

- Date: 2–6 June
- Location: Tennishöll Kópavogs Tennis Hall, Reykjavík

Champions

Men's singles
- Laurent Recouderc (AND)

Women's singles
- Danka Kovinić (MNE)

Men's doubles
- Guillaume Couillard / Thomas Oger (MON)

Women's doubles
- Eléonora Molinaro / Claudine Schaul (LUX)

Mixed doubles
- Raluca Șerban / Petros Chrysochos (CYP)
← 2013 ·	Games of the Small States of Europe	· 2017 →

The tennis competition at the 2015 Games of the Small States of Europe took place from 2–6 June 2015 at the Tennishöll Kópavogs Tennis Hall in Reykjavík.

== Medal summary ==
=== Medal table ===
Rank	Nation	Gold	Silver	Bronze	Total
1	Luxembourg	1	2	1	4
2	Cyprus	1	1	1	3
3	Montenegro	1	0	2	3
4	Andorra	1	0	1	2
5	Monaco	1	0	0	1
6	Malta	0	1	2	3
7	Liechtenstein	0	1	1	2
Totals (7 entries)		5	5	8	18

=== Medalists ===
Event	Gold	Silver	Bronze
Men's singles	Laurent Recouderc (AND)	Ugo Nastasi (LUX)	Ljubomir Čelebić (MNE)
Men's singles	Laurent Recouderc (AND)	Ugo Nastasi (LUX)	Matthew Asciak (MLT)
Men's doubles	Monaco; Guillaume Couillard; Thomas Oger	Cyprus; Petros Chrysochos; Sergis Kyratzis	Luxembourg; Ugo Nastasi; Mike Scheidweiler
Men's doubles	Monaco; Guillaume Couillard; Thomas Oger	Cyprus; Petros Chrysochos; Sergis Kyratzis	Andorra; Laurent Recouderc; Joan Bautista Poux Gautier
Women's singles	Danka Kovinić (MNE)	Kathinka Von Deichmann (LIE)	Raluca Șerban (CYP)
Women's singles	Danka Kovinić (MNE)	Kathinka Von Deichmann (LIE)	Elaine Genovese (MLT)
Women's doubles	Luxembourg; Eléonora Molinaro; Claudine Schaul	Malta; Elaine Genovese; Katrina Sammut	
Mixed doubles	Cyprus; Raluca Șerban; Petros Chrysochos	Luxembourg; Claudine Schaul; Mike Scheidweiler	Montenegro; Danka Kovinic; Ljubomir Čelebić
Mixed doubles	Cyprus; Raluca Șerban; Petros Chrysochos	Luxembourg; Claudine Schaul; Mike Scheidweiler	Liechtenstein; Kathinka Von Deichmann; Vital Leuch

== Men's singles ==
=== Seeds ===
1. (Monaco) Benjamin Balleret (quarterfinals)
2. (Cyprus) Petros Chrysochos (quarterfinals)
3. (Monaco) Romain Arneodo (second round)
4. (Luxembourg) Ugo Nastasi (final)
5. (Montenegro) Ljubomir Čelebić (semifinals)
6. (Andorra) Laurent Recouderc (winner)
7. (Cyprus) Sergis Kyratzis (quarterfinals)
8. (Malta) Matthew Asciak (semifinals)

=== Key ===
- Q = Qualifier
- WC = Wild card
- LL = Lucky loser
- Alt = Alternate
- SE = Special exempt
- PR = Protected ranking
- ITF = ITF entry
- JE = Junior exempt
- w/o = Walkover
- r = Retired
- d = Defaulted
- SR = Special ranking

Round 1
(Iceland) Birkir Gunnarsson	6	6
(Malta) Bradley Callus	2	1

Round 2
1	(Monaco) Benjamin Balleret	6	6
(San Marino) Pietro Grassi	1	3
(Liechtenstein) Timo Andrin Kranz	4	1
5	(Montenegro) Ljubomir Čelebić	6	6
4	(Luxembourg) Ugo Nastasi	4
(Andorra) Joan Bautista Poux Gautier	1	r
(Iceland) Birkir Gunnarsson	4	4
7	(Cyprus) Sergis Kyratzis	6	6
8	(Malta) Matthew Asciak	6	6
(San Marino) Marco De Rossi	1	1
(Luxembourg) Raphael Calzi	7^{7}	0	6
3	(Monaco) Romain Arneodo	6^{5}	6	1
6	(Andorra) Laurent Recouderc	6	7^{7}
(Iceland) Rafn Kumar Bonifacius	0	6^{3}
(Liechtenstein) Vital Flurin Leuch	4	1
2	(Cyprus) Petros Chrysochos	6	6

Quarterfinals
1	(Monaco) Benjamin Balleret	6^{4}	6	3
5	(Montenegro) Ljubomir Čelebić	7^{7}	2	6
4	(Luxembourg) Ugo Nastasi	6	6
7	(Cyprus) Sergis Kyratzis	3	1
8	(Malta) Matthew Asciak	6	6
(Luxembourg) Raphael Calzi	1	0
6	(Andorra) Laurent Recouderc	4	6	7
2	(Cyprus) Petros Chrysochos	6	2	5

Semifinals
5	(Montenegro) Ljubomir Čelebić	5	4
4	(Luxembourg) Ugo Nastasi	7	6
Finals
4	(Luxembourg) Ugo Nastasi	7^{7}	3	4
6	(Andorra) Laurent Recouderc	6^{4}	6	6
8	(Malta) Matthew Asciak	6^{4}	1
6	(Andorra) Laurent Recouderc	7^{7}	6

== Men's doubles ==
=== Key ===
- Q = Qualifier
- WC = Wild card
- LL = Lucky loser
- Alt = Alternate
- SE = Special exempt
- PR = Protected ranking
- ITF = ITF entry
- JE = Junior exempt
- w/o = Walkover
- r = Retired
- d = Defaulted
- SR = Special ranking

Quarterfinals

Semifinals

Finals

1
- (Luxembourg) Ugo Nastasi
- (Luxembourg) Mike Scheidweiler
6
6

- (Malta) Matthew Asciak
- (Malta) Bradley Callus
3
2

1
- (Luxembourg) Ugo Nastasi
- (Luxembourg) Mike Scheidweiler
6
4
[7]

4
- (Monaco) Guillaume Couillard
- (Monaco) Thomas Oger
4
6
[10]

4
- (Monaco) Guillaume Couillard
- (Monaco) Thomas Oger
6
6

- (San Marino) Marco De Rossi
- (San Marino) Pietro Grassi
1
1

4
- (Monaco) Guillaume Couillard
- (Monaco) Thomas Oger
6
4
[10]

2
(Cyprus) Petros Chrysochos
(Cyprus) Sergis Kyratzis
4
6
[6]

- (Iceland) Rafn Kumar Bonifacius
- (Iceland) Birkir Gunnarsson
5
4

3
- (Andorra) Jean-Baptiste Poux-Gautier
- (Andorra) Laurent Recouderc
7
6

3
- (Andorra) Jean-Baptiste Poux-Gautier
- (Andorra) Laurent Recouderc

2
(Cyprus) Petros Chrysochos
(Cyprus) Sergis Kyratzis
w
/
o

- (Liechtenstein) Timo Andrin Kranz
- (Liechtenstein) Vital Leuch
6
3
[9]

2
(Cyprus) Petros Chrysochos
(Cyprus) Sergis Kyratzis
3
6
[11]

== Women's singles ==
=== Key ===
- Q = Qualifier
- WC = Wild card
- LL = Lucky loser
- Alt = Alternate
- SE = Special exempt
- PR = Protected ranking
- ITF = ITF entry
- JE = Junior exempt
- w/o = Walkover
- r = Retired
- d = Defaulted
- SR = Special ranking

1st round
(Malta) Katrina Sammut	6	6
(Iceland) Anna Soffía Grönholm	2	3
(Iceland) Hjördís Rósa Guðmundsdóttir	6	6
(Andorra) Judit Cartaña Alaña	4	2

Quarter final
1	(Montenegro) Danka Kovinić	6	6
(Malta) Katrina Sammut	2	2
3	(Cyprus) Raluca Șerban	6	6
(Luxembourg) Lena Dimmer	0	0
(Malta) Elaine Genovese	5	7^{7}	6
4	(Luxembourg) Eléonora Molinaro	7	6^{5}	2
(Iceland) Hjördís Rósa Guðmundsdóttir	0	2
2	(Liechtenstein) Kathinka von Deichmann	6	6

Semi-final
1	(Montenegro) Danka Kovinić	6	6
3	(Cyprus) Raluca Șerban	4	2
(Malta) Elaine Genovese	1	1
2	(Liechtenstein) Kathinka von Deichmann	6	6

Final
1	(Montenegro) Danka Kovinić	6	6
2	(Liechtenstein) Kathinka von Deichmann	0	1

== Women's doubles ==
=== Key ===
- Q = Qualifier
- WC = Wild card
- LL = Lucky loser
- Alt = Alternate
- SE = Special exempt
- PR = Protected ranking
- ITF = ITF entry
- JE = Junior exempt
- w/o = Walkover
- r = Retired
- d = Defaulted
- SR = Special ranking

Semifinals

Final

1
- (Luxembourg) Eléonora Molinaro
- (Luxembourg) Claudine Schaul

Bye

1
- (Luxembourg) Eléonora Molinaro
- (Luxembourg) Claudine Schaul
6
4
10

- (Malta) Elaine Genovese
- (Malta) Katrina Sammut
1
6
8

- (Iceland) Anna Soffía Grönholm
- (Iceland) Hjördís Rósa Guðmundsdóttir
4
2

- (Malta) Elaine Genovese
- (Malta) Katrina Sammut
6
6

== Mixed doubles ==
=== Key ===
- Q = Qualifier
- WC = Wild card
- LL = Lucky loser
- Alt = Alternate
- SE = Special exempt
- PR = Protected ranking
- ITF = ITF entry
- JE = Junior exempt
- w/o = Walkover
- r = Retired
- d = Defaulted
- SR = Special ranking

Quarterfinals

Semifinals

Final

1
- (Montenegro) Ljubomir Čelebić
- (Montenegro) Danka Kovinić

Bye

1
- (Montenegro) Ljubomir Čelebić
- (Montenegro) Danka Kovinić
6
5
[7]

4
- (Luxembourg) Mike Scheidweiler
- (Luxembourg) Claudine Schaul
3
7
[10]

4
- (Luxembourg) Mike Scheidweiler
- (Luxembourg) Claudine Schaul
6
6

- (Iceland) Birkir Gunnarsson
- (Iceland) Hera Björk Brynjarsdóttir
2
1

4
- (Luxembourg) Mike Scheidweiler
- (Luxembourg) Claudine Schaul
4
6^{4}

2
- (Cyprus) Petros Chrysochos
- (Cyprus) Raluca Șerban
6
7^{7}

- (Andorra) Joan Bautista Poux Gautier
- (Andorra) Judit Cartaña Alaña

3
- (Liechtenstein) Vital Leuch
- (Liechtenstein) Kathinka Von Deichmann
w
/
o

3
- (Liechtenstein) Vital Leuch
- (Liechtenstein) Kathinka Von Deichmann
5
4

2
- (Cyprus) Petros Chrysochos
- (Cyprus) Raluca Șerban
7
6

- (Malta) Elaine Genovese
- (Malta) Katrina Sammut
0
3

2
- (Cyprus) Petros Chrysochos
- (Cyprus) Raluca Șerban
6
6
