= Christi Potgieter =

South African tennis player

- Full name: Hester Christina Potgieter
- Country (sports): South Africa
- Born: 15 October 1992 (age 32); Bloemfontein, South Africa
- Height: 5 ft 6 in (168 cm)
- Plays: Right-handed

Singles
- Highest ranking: No. 632 (2 Nov 2009)

Doubles
- Career titles: 2 ITF
- Highest ranking: No. 410 (5 Oct 2009)

Hester Christina Potgieter (born 15 October 1992), known as Christi Potgieter, is a South African former professional tennis player. Her married name is Slabbert.

Born in Bloemfontein, Potgieter was raised on a farm near Petrusville, Northern Cape. She attended Eunice High School in Bloemfontein and played collegiate tennis for Texas A&M. Competing briefly in professional tennis, she attained best rankings of 632 for singles and 410 for doubles. In 2010 she was a member of the South Africa Fed Cup team, winning one singles and two doubles rubbers. Her sister Elzé has also played Fed Cup tennis for South Africa.

== ITF finals ==
=== Doubles: 2 (2–0) ===
| Outcome | No. | Date | Tournament | Surface | Partner | Opponents | Score |
|---|---|---|---|---|---|---|---|
| Winner | 1. | Oct 2008 | ITF Pretoria, South Africa | Hard | (South Africa) Bianca Swanepoel | (South Africa) Tegan Edwards (Belgium) Davinia Lobbinger | 6–1, 6–3 |
| Winner | 2. | Nov 2008 | ITF Pretoria 2, South Africa | Hard | (South Africa) Bianca Swanepoel | (South Africa) Surina De Beer (South Africa) Lisa Marshall | 6–3, 6–3 |

== See also ==
- List of South Africa Fed Cup team representatives
