= Benjamin Balleret =

Monegasque tennis player (born 1983)

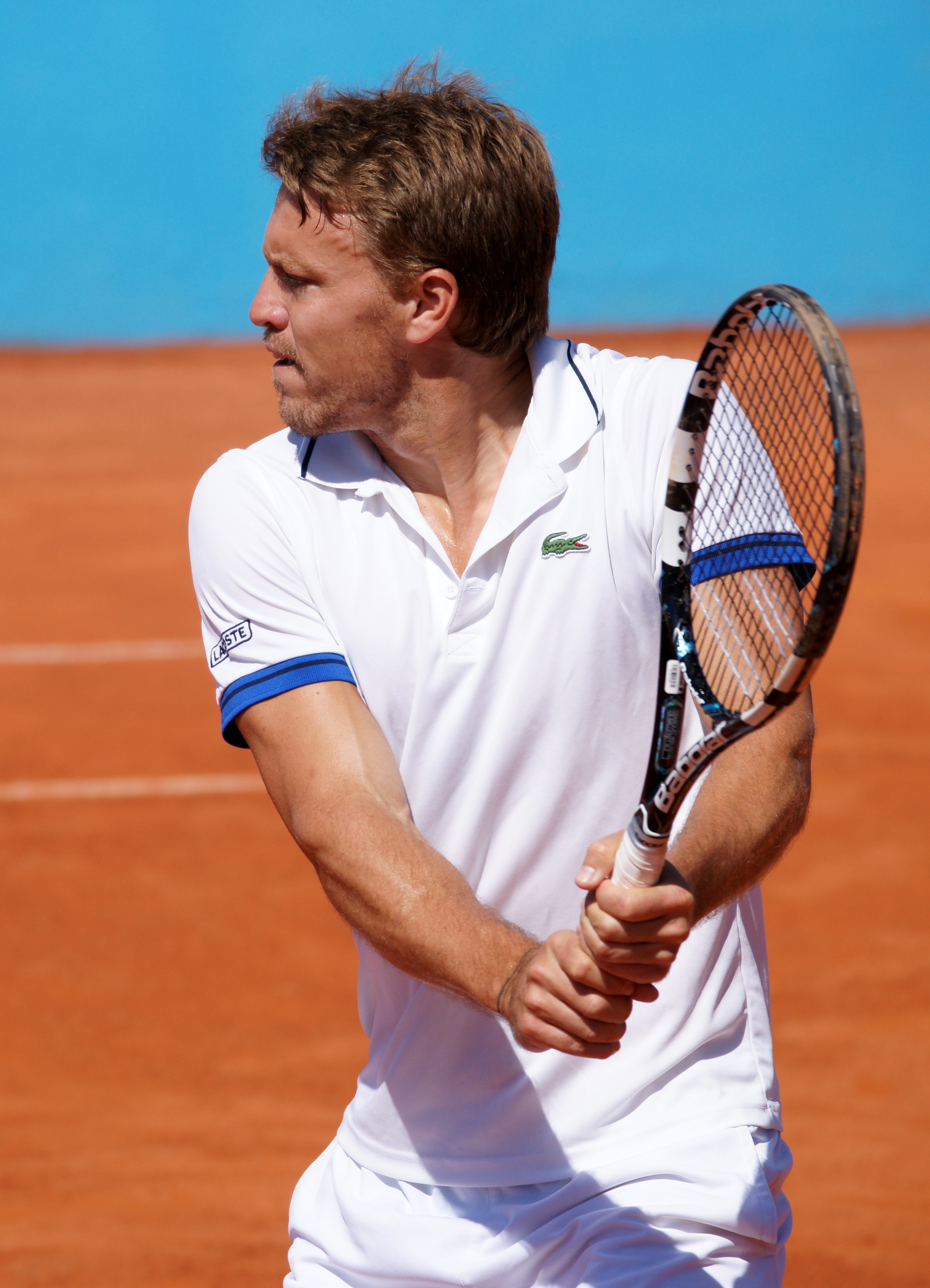
- Balleret at the 2014 Open de Nice Côte d'Azur
- Country (sports): Monaco
- Residence: Monte Carlo, Monaco
- Born: 15 January 1983 (age 43) Monte Carlo, Monaco
- Height: 1.85 m (6 ft 1 in)
- Turned pro: 2001
- Retired: 2017–2024
- Plays: Right-handed (two-handed backhand)
- Prize money: US$275,090

Singles
- Career record: 27–30
- Career titles: 0
- Highest ranking: No. 204 (19 June 2006)

Grand Slam singles results
- Australian Open: Q1 (2007, 2010, 2014)
- French Open: Q3 (2007)
- Wimbledon: Q2 (2010)
- US Open: Q1 (2006, 2010)

Doubles
- Career record: 9-8
- Career titles: 0
- Highest ranking: No. 135 (2 March 2015)
Medal record
Games of the Small States of Europe
Gold medal – first place	2005 Andorra	Singles
Silver medal – second place	2003 Malta	Doubles
Silver medal – second place	2005 Andorra	Doubles
Silver medal – second place	2007 Monaco	Singles
Silver medal – second place	2009 Cyprus	Singles
Silver medal – second place	2011 Liechtenstein	Singles
Bronze medal – third place	2011 Liechtenstein	Mixed Doubles
Bronze medal – third place	2013 Luxembourg	Mixed Doubles

Benjamin Balleret (born 15 January 1983) is a professional tennis player and coach from Monaco. Balleret is a member of the Monaco Davis Cup team.

== Personal life ==
His father, Bernard Balleret, stepmother Alexia Dechaume-Balleret, and aunt Virginie Paquet are also former professional tennis players. Balleret's half-brother and protégé Valentin Vacherot also plays the sport professionally, as do their cousins, Arthur Rinderknech and Chloé Paquet.

== Tennis career ==
=== Juniors ===
As a junior Balleret reached as high as No. 19 in the junior world singles rankings (and No. 29 in doubles) in 2001.

=== Professional career ===
In 2005, representing Monaco, Benjamin Balleret won the gold medal in men’s singles at the 2005 Games of the Small States of Europe in Andorra, defeating Boris Pašanski, a Serbian player representing Malta at the time, in the final.

He is also best remembered for his April 2006 run to the third round of the Monte Carlo Open, an ATP Masters Series. Entering the tournament, he was ranked 351st in the world and had competed only in challenger tournaments and several Davis Cup matches (he played for the Monegasque team in 2004 and 2005 and compiled a record of 4 wins and 5 losses). However, on 16 April 2006, he received a wild card into the qualifying draw of the Monte Carlo Open and won upsets over seeded, far more accomplished players than he including clay court specialist Albert Portas (at the time ranked 106th in the world and seeded 13th in the qualifying draw) as well as U.S. Open and Wimbledon semi-finalist Jonas Björkman (at the time ranked 71st in the world and seeded third in the qualifying draw). These wins earned Balleret a spot in the main draw, and his performance there is what earned him international headlines. He won upsets over Christophe Rochus (at the time ranked 44th in the world) and Sébastien Grosjean (at the time ranked 23rd in the world, number one in France, and seeded thirteenth in the main draw). Balleret's run came to an end in the third round, in which he lost to world number one Roger Federer.

After Balleret's performance at this prestigious clay court event, he shot up 134 positions in the rankings to World No. 217.

In 2013, Balleret and Guillaume Couillard played the longest professional tiebreak in known tennis history, lasting 70 points (36–34). Balleret won the match 7–6^{(36–34)}, 6–1 in the third qualifying round for the USA F1 Futures in Plantation, Florida. He won the Pensacola Futures tournament in 2013.
