= Ugo Nastasi =

French–Luxembourgish tennis player(born 1993)

- Country (sports): Luxembourg; France
- Residence: Longwy, France
- Born: 16 April 1993 (age 33) Thionville, France
- Height: 1.85 m (6 ft 1 in)
- Plays: Right-handed (two-handed backhand)
- Prize money: $17,762

Singles
- Career record: 4–11 (at ATP Tour level, Grand Slam level, and in Davis Cup)
- Career titles: 0
- Highest ranking: No. 656 (28 September 2015)

Doubles
- Career record: 1–1 (at ATP Tour level, Grand Slam level, and in Davis Cup)
- Career titles: 0
- Highest ranking: No. 697 (28 September 2015)

Team competitions
- Davis Cup: 12–15
- Last updated on: 31 December 2022.

Ugo Nastasi (born 16 April 1993) is a French–Luxembourgish tennis player.

Nastasi has a career high ATP singles ranking of 656 achieved on 28 September 2015. He also has a career high ATP doubles ranking of 697, also achieved on 28 September 2015.

Nastasi has represented Luxembourg at Davis Cup, where he has a win–loss record of 12–15, including a 5-set win against Casper Ruud from Norway.

== ATP Challenger and ITF Futures/World Tennis Tour finals ==
=== Doubles: 6 (0–6) ===
Legend ATP Challenger (0–0) ITF Futures/World Tennis Tour (0–6)	Finals by surface Hard (0–3) Clay (0–3) Grass (0–0) Carpet (0–0)

Result	W–L	Date	Tournament	Tier	Surface	Partner	Opponents	Score
Loss	0–1	Jul 2014	France F14, Bourg-en-Bresse	Futures	Clay	(France) Maxime Forcin	(France) Quentin Halys (France) Maxime Hamou	6–2, 2–6, [8–10]
Loss	0–2	Sep 2014	Turkey F30, Antalya	Futures	Hard	(Luxembourg) Christophe Nickels	(United States) Alexios Halebian (France) Tom Jomby	4–6, 2–6
Loss	0–3	Jun 2015	Belgium F2, Damme	Futures	Clay	(France) Antoine Hoang	(Belgium) Sander Gille (Belgium) Joran Vliegen	2–6, 3–6
Loss	0–4	Jul 2015	Germany F8, Trier	Futures	Clay	(Luxembourg) Mike Scheidweiler	(Austria) Maximilian Neuchrist (Germany) George Von Massow	4–6, 7–5, [8–10]
Loss	0–5	Aug 2015	Egypt F28, Sharm El Sheikh	Futures	Hard	(France) Yannick Jankovits	(Czech Republic) Libor Salaba (Sweden) Milos Sekulic	2–6, 2–6
Loss	0–6	Sep 2015	Tunisia F22, El Kantaoui	Futures	Hard	(France) Romain Bauvy	(Tunisia) Anis Ghorbel (Bulgaria) Vasko Mladenov	6–2, 5–7, [10–12]
