= Mike Scheidweiler =

Luxembourgish tennis player

- Country (sports): Luxembourg
- Residence: Itzig, Luxembourg
- Born: 14 November 1981 (age 44) Luxembourg City, Luxembourg
- Height: 1.88 m (6 ft 2 in)
- Plays: Right-handed
- Prize money: $49,645

Singles
- Career record: 7–12 (at ATP Tour level, Grand Slam level, and in Davis Cup)
- Career titles: 4 ITF
- Highest ranking: No. 281 (26 May 2003)

Doubles
- Career record: 15–13 (at ATP Tour level, Grand Slam level, and in Davis Cup)
- Career titles: 11 ITF
- Highest ranking: No. 272 (30 September 2002)
- Last updated on: 28 November 2016.

Mike Scheidweiler (born 14 November 1981) is a Luxembourgish tennis player.

Scheidweiler has a career high ATP singles ranking of 281 achieved on 26 May 2003. He also has a career high ATP doubles ranking of 272 achieved on 30 September 2002.

Scheidweiler represents Luxembourg in the Davis Cup beginning with the 1998 Davis Cup. He is still a member of the Davis Cup team and won a match in the 2016 Davis Cup over Norway.

== ATP Challenger and ITF Futures finals ==
=== Singles: 7 (4–3) ===
Legend ATP Challenger (0–0) ITF Futures (4–3)	Finals by surface Hard (1–2) Clay (3–1) Grass (0–0) Carpet (0–0)

Result	W–L	Date	Tournament	Tier	Surface	Opponent	Score
Loss	0–1	Sep 2000	Spain F10, Madrid	Futures	Hard	(France) Julien Couly	2–6, 6–7^{(3–7)}
Win	1–1	Jun 2001	Germany F6, Kassel	Futures	Clay	(France) Eric Prodon	5–7, 6–1, 6–4
Loss	1–2	Feb 2002	France F5, Bressuire	Futures	Hard	(France) Jerome Hanquez	2–6, 2–6
Loss	1–3	Jun 2002	Morocco F2, Marrakesh	Futures	Clay	(Spain) Santiago Ventura	4–6, 4–6
Win	2–3	Jun 2002	Germany F8, Kassel	Futures	Clay	(Germany) Dieter Kindlmann	6–2, 7–6^{(7–5)}
Win	3–3	Aug 2002	Great Britain F6, London	Futures	Hard	(Republic of Ireland) Peter Clarke	4–6, 6–1, 6–1
Win	4–3	Feb 2003	Portugal F1, Espinho	Futures	Clay	(Portugal) Helder Lopes	7–6^{(8–6)}, 6–4

=== Doubles: 16 (11–5) ===
Legend ATP Challenger (0–1) ITF Futures (11–4)	Finals by surface Hard (2–0) Clay (8–4) Grass (0–0) Carpet (1–1)

Result	W–L	Date	Tournament	Tier	Surface	Partner	Opponents	Score
Loss	0–1	Aug 1998	Belgium F2, Charleroi	Futures	Clay	(Luxembourg) Pascal Schaul	(Belgium) Arnaud Fontaine (Belgium) Wim Neefs	6–7, 7–5, 1–6
Win	1–1	May 2001	Italy F3, Latina	Futures	Clay	(France) Julien Mathieu	(Italy) Francesco Aldi (Italy) Stefano Mocci	6–4, 6–2
Win	2–1	Jul 2001	Romania F1, Bucharest	Futures	Clay	(France) Mikael Sicco	(Moldova) Victor Ribas (Greece) Anastasios Vasiliadis	6–3, 3–6, 6–2
Win	3–1	Aug 2001	Luxembourg F1, Luxembourg	Futures	Clay	(Luxembourg) Gilles Müller	(Canada) Stephen Adamson (Netherlands) Raoul Snijders	6–4, 6–3
Win	4–1	Nov 2001	Netherlands Antillies F1, Curacao	Futures	Hard	(France) Nicolas Perrein	(Ecuador) Carlos Avellan (Venezuela) Johnnatan Medina-Alvarez	6–1, 6–3
Loss	4–2	Feb 2002	Great Britain F2, Glasgow	Futures	Carpet	(Luxembourg) Gilles Müller	(Switzerland) Yves Allegro (Belgium) Arnaud Fontaine	3–6, 4–6
Win	5–2	May 2002	Great Britain F4, Hatfield	Futures	Clay	(France) Nicolas Perrein	(Australia) Luke Bourgeouis (Australia) Alun Jones	7–6^{(7–2)}, 4–6, 6–3
Win	6–2	Jun 2002	Morocco F2, Marrakesh	Futures	Clay	(Japan) Jun Kato	(Australia) Dino Dattoli (Australia) Kane Dewhurst	6–4, 6–2
Win	7–2	Jun 2002	Morocco F3, Agadir	Futures	Clay	(Japan) Jun Kato	(Egypt) Karim Maamoun (Egypt) Mohamed Mamoun	6–0, 6–2
Win	8–2	Aug 2002	Netherlands F1, Enschede	Futures	Clay	(Japan) Jun Kato	(Netherlands) Sander Groen (Netherlands) Sander Hommel	6–3, 6–2
Win	9–2	Feb 2003	Portugal F1, Espinho	Futures	Clay	(Germany) Christopher Kas	(Slovakia) Michal Mertinak (Austria) Marco Mirnegg	6–3, 6–2
Loss	9–3	Mar 2003	Portugal F7, Estoril	Futures	Clay	(Belgium) Stefan Wauters	(Portugal) Emanuel Couto (Portugal) Bernardo Mota	w/o
Loss	9–4	Jul 2013	Olbia, Italy	Challenger	Clay	(France) Julien Jeanpierre	(Italy) Alessio Di Mauro (Italy) Vincenzo Santopadre	6–2, 4–6, 2–6
Win	10–4	Nov 2003	France F22, Rodez	Futures	Hard	(Luxembourg) Gilles Kremer	(Netherlands) Fred Hammes (Netherlands) Melvyn Op Der Heijde	5–7, 6–3, 6–1
Win	11–4	Jan 2010	Germany F3, Kaarst	Futures	Carpet	(France) Ludovic Walter	(Sweden) Daniel Danilovic (Czech Republic) Pavel Snobel	7–6^{(12–10)},6–7^{(6–8)}, [10–4]
Loss	11–5	Jul 2015	Germany F8, Trier	Futures	Clay	(Luxembourg) Ugo Nastasi	(Austria) Maximilian Neuchrist (Germany) George Von Massow	4–6, 7–5, [8–10]
