= Guillaume Couillard (tennis player) =

Monegasque tennis player (born 1975)

- Country (sports): Monaco
- Born: 10 December 1975 (age 49)
- Height: 1,83m
- Turned pro: 1995
- Retired: 2014
- Plays: Right-handed
- Prize money: $26,278

Singles
- Career record: 3–8
- Career titles: 0
- Highest ranking: No. 569 (28 October 2002)

Doubles
- Career record: 6–13
- Career titles: 0
- Highest ranking: No. 839 (28 October 2002)

Guillaume Couillard (born 10 December 1975) is a professional Monegasque former tennis player and a coach. Couillard reached his career-high ATP Tour singles ranking of World No. 569 in October 2002. He primarily played on the Futures circuit and the Challenger circuit.

== Coaching career ==
He is currently coaching Monegasque players Hugo Nys, Romain Arneodo and Lucas Catarina.

== Tennis career ==
Couillard was a member of the Monegasque Davis Cup team since 2002, having posted a 14–10 record in singles and a 13–10 record in doubles in thirty-five ties played.

In 2013, Couillard and Benjamin Balleret played the longest known tiebreak in professional tennis history, lasting 70 points (34–36). Couillard lost the match 6–7(34), 1–6 in the third qualifying round for the USA F1 Futures in Plantation, Florida.

== Career finals ==
=== Singles (0–2) ===
Legend
Grand Slam (0–0)
Tennis Masters Cup (0–0)
ATP Masters Series (0–0)
ATP Tour (0–0)
Challengers (0–0)
Futures (0–2)

Outcome	No.	Date	Tournament	Surface	Opponent	Score
Runner-up	1.	June 17, 2002	Kigali, Rwanda	Clay	(France) Gwenael Gueit	0–2, RET.
Runner-up	2.	February 23, 2004	Benin, Nigeria	Hard	(Ivory Coast) Valentin Sanon	6–1, 6–7, 6–7
