= 2011 Games of the Small States of Europe =

International multi-sport event

XIV Games of the Small States of Europe XIV Spiele der kleinen Staaten von Europa
- Country: Liechtenstein
- Nations: 9
- Athletes: 750
- Events: 113 in 9 sports
- Opening: 30 May 2011
- Closing: 4 June 2011
- Opened by: Hans-Adam II, Prince of Liechtenstein
- Website: www.liegames2011.li

The 14th Games of the Small States of Europe (GSSE), also known as the XIVth Games of the Small States of Europe were held between 30 May – 4 June 2011 in multiple municipalities in Liechtenstein. The Games featured competition by the 9 members of the GSSE in nine sports, with three of the sports featuring seven disciplines. Events were hosted in nine different municipalities in the country.

Liechtenstein was not opposed in their bid for the 2011 Games, possibly because it was the country's turn to host the Games based on the event's rotation. The 2011 Games marked the second time Liechtenstein hosted the Games, following the country's hosting of the 8th edition in 1999. These were the first games with the participation of Montenegro.

== Games ==
=== Participating teams ===
- Andorra (64)
- Cyprus (131)
- Iceland (113)
- Liechtenstein (75) (Host team)
- Luxembourg (111)
- Malta (72)
- Monaco (89)
- Montenegro (20) (Debut)
- San Marino (75)

=== Sports ===
Numbers in parentheses indicate the number of medal events contested in each sport.

- Athletics (35)
- Cycling (6)
  - Mountain biking (2)
  - Road (4)
- Judo (16)
- Shooting (6)
- Squash (4)
- Swimming (32)
- Table tennis (6)
- Tennis (5)
- Volleyball (2)

=== Venues ===
Venue	Sports Held
Beachplatz Weiherring, Mauren	Beach Volleyball
Dreifachturnhalle, Triesen	Table Tennis
Dreifachturnhalle Resch, Schaan	Volleyball
Gemeindesaal Balzers, Balzers	Shooting
Schiessstand Rheinau, Vaduz	Shooting
Schulsportzentrum Unterland, Eschen	Judo
Schwimmbad Mühleholz, Vaduz	Swimming
Sportplatz Rheinwiese, Schaan	Athletics
Squash House, Vaduz	Squash
Tenniscenter Bannholz, Vaduz	Tennis
Turnhalle Primarschule, Triesenberg	Volleyball

=== Calendar ===
OC	Opening ceremony	●	Event competitions	1	Event finals	CC	Closing ceremony

May/June	30th Mon	31st Tue	1st Wed	2nd Thur	3rd Fri	4th Sat	
Ceremonies	OC					CC	
Athletics			9		13	13	35
Beach Volleyball		●	●	●	●	2	2
Cycling		2		1	2		5
Judo		14		2			16
Shooting		2	2		1		5
Squash		●	●	2	●	2	4
Swimming		8	10	8	6		32
Table Tennis		●	2	2	1	2	7
Tennis		●	●	●	2	3	5
Volleyball		●	●	●	●	2	2
Total Gold Medals		26	23	15	25	24	113
May/June	30th Mon	31st Tue	1st Wed	2nd Thur	3rd Fri	4th Sat	T

== Medal table ==
Key

The host country is highlighted in lavender blue

* Host nation (Liechtenstein)

Rank	Nation	Gold	Silver	Bronze	Total
1	Cyprus (CYP)	32	30	20	82
2	Luxembourg (LUX)	30	15	27	72
3	Iceland (ISL)	20	23	25	68
4	Malta (MLT)	8	12	9	29
5	Liechtenstein (LIE)*	6	10	11	27
6	Monaco (MON)	6	9	14	29
7	Montenegro (MNE)	4	2	2	8
8	Andorra (AND)	3	7	5	15
9	San Marino (SMR)	3	4	11	18
Totals (9 entries)		112	112	124	348
