= 2013 Games of the Small States of Europe =

International multi-sport event

XV Games of the Small States of Europe XV Spiller vun de klenge Staate vun Europa XV Jeux des petits États d'Europe XV Spiele der kleinen Staaten von Europa
- Country: Luxembourg
- Nations: 9
- Athletes: 762
- Events: 120 in 10 sports
- Opening: 27 May 2013
- Closing: 1 June 2013
- Opened by: Henri, Grand Duke of Luxembourg
- Website: www.luxembourg2013.lu

The 2013 Games of the Small States of Europe, also known as the XV Games of the Small States of Europe, were held in Luxembourg City and surrounding areas. The slogan, as well as the logo, was "Are you ready for the Games?" The opening ceremony was held at the Stade Josy Barthel on 27 May; the closing ceremony was held at the Neimënster Abbey on 1 June.

== Games ==
=== Participating teams ===
- Andorra (39)
- Cyprus (137)
- Iceland (125)
- Liechtenstein (37)
- Luxembourg (167) (host team)
- Malta (63)
- Monaco (93)
- Montenegro (12)
- San Marino (89)

=== Sports ===
- Athletics (36)
- Basketball (2)
- Cycling (6)
  - Mountain biking (2)
  - Road (4)
- Gymnastics (12)
- Judo (12)
- Shooting (5)
  - Trap shooting (1)
- Swimming (32)
- Table tennis (6)
- Tennis (5)
- Volleyball (4)
  - Beach volleyball (2)

Note: Basketball and artistic gymnastics were not contested in the 2011 Games of the Small States of Europe. However, squash was dropped for this year's Games, also from 2011.

=== Venues ===
| Venue | Sports held |
|---|---|
| d'Coque, Kirchberg, Luxembourg | Basketball |
| d'Coque, Kirchberg, Luxembourg | Volleyball |
| d'Coque, Kirchberg, Luxembourg | Beach volleyball |
| d'Coque, Kirchberg, Luxembourg | Swimming |
| d'Coque, Kirchberg, Luxembourg | Table tennis |
| Stade Josy Barthel, Luxembourg City | Tennis |
| Stade Josy Barthel, Luxembourg City | Gymnastics |
| Stade Josy Barthel, Luxembourg City | Athletics |
| Tramsschapp, Limpertsberg | Judo |
| Tramsschapp, Limpertsberg | Shooting |
| Differdange | Trap shooting |
| Cessange | Cycling |
| Hesperange | Mountainbike |

=== Calendar ===
| OC | Opening ceremony | ● | Event competitions | 1 | Event finals | CC | Closing ceremony |

| May/June | 27th Mon | 28th Tue | 29th Wed | 30th Thur | 31st Fri | 1st Sat | |
|---|---|---|---|---|---|---|---|
| Ceremonies | OC | | | | | CC | |
| Athletics | | 10 | | 13 | | 13 | 36 |
| Basketball | | ● | ● | ● | ● | 2 | 2 |
| Beach volleyball | | ● | ● | ● | ● | 2 | 2 |
| Cycling | | 2 | | 2 | 2 | | 6 |
| Gymnastics | | 2 | | 10 | | | 12 |
| Judo | | 10 | | 2 | | | 12 |
| Shooting | | ● | 3 | | 2 | | 5 |
| Swimming | | 8 | 10 | 8 | 6 | | 32 |
| Table tennis | | ● | 2 | 2 | ● | 2 | 6 |
| Tennis | | ● | ● | ● | 3 | 2 | 5 |
| Volleyball | | ● | ● | ● | 1 | 1 | 2 |
| Total gold medals | | 32 | 15 | 37 | 14 | 22 | 120 |
| May/June | 27th Mon | 28th Tue | 29th Wed | 30th Thur | 31st Fri | 1st Sat | T |

== Medal table ==
Key:

* Host nation (Luxembourg)

| Rank | Nation | Gold | Silver | Bronze | Total |
|---|---|---|---|---|---|
| 1 | Luxembourg (LUX)* | 36 | 39 | 31 | 106 |
| 2 | Iceland (ISL) | 28 | 29 | 30 | 87 |
| 3 | Cyprus (CYP) | 28 | 17 | 24 | 69 |
| 4 | Liechtenstein (LIE) | 11 | 16 | 8 | 35 |
| 5 | Montenegro (MNE) | 9 | 0 | 2 | 11 |
| 6 | Monaco (MON) | 7 | 8 | 15 | 30 |
| 7 | Malta (MLT) | 2 | 11 | 13 | 26 |
| 8 | Andorra (AND) | 2 | 1 | 3 | 6 |
| 9 | San Marino (SMR) | 1 | 4 | 9 | 14 |
| Totals (9 entries) | | 124 | 125 | 135 | 384 |
