= Tennis at the 2009 Games of the Small States of Europe – Men's singles =

Men's singles
- Tennis at the 2009 Games of the Small States of Europe

Events
Singles	men	women
Doubles	men	women
← 2007 ·	Games of the Small States of Europe	· 2011 →

The men's singles tennis event at the 2009 Games of the Small States of Europe was one of four tennis events held in Cyprus.

== Medalists ==
Gold	(Monaco) Jean-René Lisnard
Silver	(Monaco) Benjamin Balleret
Bronze	(Liechtenstein) Jirka Lokaj
Bronze	(San Marino) Stefano Galvani

== Seeds ==
1. (Monaco) Jean-René Lisnard (champion, gold medalist)
2. (San Marino) Stefano Galvani (semifinals, bronze medalist)
3. (Monaco) Benjamin Balleret (final, silver medalist)
4. (Cyprus) Photos Kallias (second round)

== Draw ==
=== Finals ===
Semifinals	Final
(Monaco) Jean-René Lisnard def. (Liechtenstein) Jirka Lokaj 6–3, 6–4	(Monaco) Jean-René Lisnard def. (Monaco) Benjamin Balleret 7–5, 6–2
(Monaco) Benjamin Balleret def. (San Marino) Stefano Galvani 6–4, 3–6, 6–3

=== Key ===
- Q = Qualifier
- WC = Wild card
- LL = Lucky loser
- Alt = Alternate
- ITF = ITF entry
- PR = Protected ranking
- SR = Special ranking
- SE = Special exempt
- JE = Junior exempt
- JR = Junior Accelerator Programme entrant
- CO = College Accelerator Programme entrant
- NG = Next Gen Accelerator Program entrant
- w/o = Walkover
- r = Retired
- d = Defaulted

First round
(Malta) Mathew Asciak	3	3
(Iceland) Arnar Sigurdsson	6	6
4	(Cyprus) Photos Kallias	6	6
(Andorra) Hector Hormigo-Herrera	1	1
(San Marino) Giacomo Zonzini	0	4
(Liechtenstein) Jirka Lokaj	6	6
(Liechtenstein) Gian Carlo Besimo	6	3	0
(Cyprus) Filippos Tsangaridis	4	6	6
(Malta) Daniel Ceros	2	2
3	(Monaco) Benjamin Balleret	6	6
(Andorra) Jean-Baptiste Poux-Gautier	6	6
(Iceland) Birkir Gunnarsson	1	1

Second round
1	(Monaco) Jean-René Lisnard	7	6
(Iceland) Arnar Sigurdsson	5	4
4	(Cyprus) Photos Kallias	3	4
(Liechtenstein) Jirka Lokaj	6	6
(Cyprus) Filippos Tsangaridis	1	1
3	(Monaco) Benjamin Balleret	6	6
(Andorra) Jean-Baptiste Poux-Gautier	2	3
2	(San Marino) Stefano Galvani	6	6

Semifinals
1	(Monaco) Jean-René Lisnard	6	6
(Liechtenstein) Jirka Lokaj	0	3
3	(Monaco) Benjamin Balleret	7	6
2	(San Marino) Stefano Galvani	6	4

Final
1	(Monaco) Jean-René Lisnard	4	6	7
3	(Monaco) Benjamin Balleret	6	1	5
