= Tennis at the 2009 Games of the Small States of Europe – Men's doubles =

Men's doubles
- Tennis at the 2009 Games of the Small States of Europe

Events
Singles	men	women
Doubles	men	women
← 2007 ·	Games of the Small States of Europe	· 2011 →

The men's doubles was one of four events of the tennis program at the 2009 Games of the Small States of Europe in Cyprus.

== Medalists ==
Gold	(Monaco) Jean-René Lisnard / Guillaume Couillard
Silver	(San Marino) Domenico Vicini / Stefano Galvani
Bronze	(Iceland) Arnar Sigurdsson / Birkir Gunnarsson
Bronze	(Andorra) Jordi Vila-Vila / Jean-Baptiste Poux-Gautier

== Seeds ==
1. (San Marino) Domenico Vicini / Stefano Galvani (final, silver medalists)
2. (Cyprus) Photos Kallias / Demetrios Leontis (first round)
3. (Monaco) Jean-René Lisnard / Guillaume Couillard (champions, gold medalists)
4. (Iceland) Arnar Sigurdsson / Birkir Gunnarsson (semifinals, bronze medalists)

== Draw ==
=== Key ===
- Q = Qualifier
- WC = Wild card
- LL = Lucky loser
- Alt = Alternate
- SE = Special exempt
- PR = Protected ranking
- ITF = ITF entry
- JE = Junior exempt
- w/o = Walkover
- r = Retired
- d = Defaulted
- SR = Special ranking

First round
1	(San Marino) Domenico Vicini (San Marino) Stefano Galvani
bye
(Malta) Daniel Ceros (Malta) Mathew Asciak	4	4
4	(Iceland) Arnar Sigurdsson (Iceland) Birkir Gunnarsson	6	6
3	(Monaco) Jean-René Lisnard (Monaco) Guillaume Couillard	7	7
(Liechtenstein) Gian Carlo Besimo (Liechtenstein) Jirka Lokaj	5	5
(Andorra) Jordi Vila-Vila (Andorra) Jean-Baptiste Poux-Gautier	6	6
2	(Cyprus) Photos Kallias (Cyprus) Demetrios Leontis	3	4

Semifinals
1	(San Marino) Domenico Vicini (San Marino) Stefano Galvani	7	6
4	(Iceland) Arnar Sigurdsson (Iceland) Birkir Gunnarsson	5	1
3	(Monaco) Jean-René Lisnard (Monaco) Guillaume Couillard	6	6
(Andorra) Jordi Vila-Vila (Andorra) Jean-Baptiste Poux-Gautier	2	1

Final
1	(San Marino) Domenico Vicini (San Marino) Stefano Galvani	1	2
3	(Monaco) Jean-René Lisnard (Monaco) Guillaume Couillard	6	6
