= 2009 Camparini Gioielli Cup – Singles =

Singles
- 2009 Camparini Gioielli Cup

Final
- Champion: (Italy) Paolo Lorenzi
- Runner-up: (Monaco) Jean-René Lisnard
- Score: 7–5, 1–6, 6–2

Events
Singles	Doubles
← 2008 ·	Camparini Gioielli Cup	· 2010 →

Mathieu Montcourt was the defending champion. He lost to Miguel Ángel López Jaén in the first round.
Paolo Lorenzi defeated Jean-René Lisnard in the final 7–5, 1–6, 6–2.

== Seeds ==
1. (Chile) Nicolás Massú (second round)
2. (Brazil) Marcos Daniel (quarterfinals)
3. (Italy) Flavio Cipolla (quarterfinals)
4. (France) Mathieu Montcourt (first round)
5. (France) Josselin Ouanna (first round)
6. (Spain) Pere Riba (second round)
7. (Italy) Tomas Tenconi (first round)
8. (Germany) Denis Gremelmayr (semifinals)

== Draw ==
=== Key ===
- Q = Qualifier
- WC = Wild card
- LL = Lucky loser
- Alt = Alternate
- SE = Special exempt
- PR = Protected ranking
- ITF = ITF entry
- JE = Junior exempt
- w/o = Walkover
- r = Retired
- d = Defaulted
- SR = Special ranking

=== Final four ===
Semifinals
(Monaco) Jean-René Lisnard	7	1	6
8	(Germany) Denis Gremelmayr	5	6	3
(Italy) Paolo Lorenzi	7	6
(Argentina) Sebastián Decoud	6^{6}	1

Final
(Monaco) Jean-René Lisnard	5	6	2
(Italy) Paolo Lorenzi	7	1	6

=== Top half ===
First round
1	(Chile) N Massú	6	7
SE	(Slovakia) P Červenák	3	6^{4}
(Canada) P Polansky	6	4	6
WC	(Italy) M Trevisan	0	6	3
SE	(Argentina) N Todero	1	6	2
(Monaco) J-R Lisnard	6	4	6
(Switzerland) G Bastl	6	4	2
6	(Spain) P Riba	4	6	6
4	(France) M Montcourt	2	6^{1}
(Spain) MÁ López Jaén	6	7
(Canada) P-L Duclos	4	6^{10}
Q	(Italy) T Fabbiano	6	7
(Argentina) M Puerta	4	2
WC	(Argentina) M Zabaleta	6	6
(France) O Patience	3	1
8	(Germany) D Gremelmayr	6	6

Second round
1	(Chile) N Massú	6^{4}	6	4
(Canada) P Polansky	7	1	6
(Monaco) J-R Lisnard	7	6
6	(Spain) P Riba	6^{3}	4
(Spain) MÁ López Jaén	7	1	6
Q	(Italy) T Fabbiano	5	6	4
WC	(Argentina) M Zabaleta	6	6^{2}	3
8	(Germany) D Gremelmayr	1	7	6

Quarterfinals
(Canada) P Polansky	5	4
(Monaco) J-R Lisnard	7	6
(Spain) MÁ López Jaén	3	4
8	(Germany) D Gremelmayr	6	6

Semifinals
(Monaco) J-R Lisnard	7	1	6
8	(Germany) D Gremelmayr	5	6	3

=== Bottom half ===
First round
5	(France) J Ouanna	6	5	4
Q	(Italy) A Brizzi	1	7	6
(Italy) P Lorenzi	3	6	6
WC	(Italy) D Bracciali	6	2	3
(Germany) T Kamke	3	6	6
(Italy) S Galvani	6	4	1
(Belgium) Y Mertens	6^{2}	3
3	(Italy) F Cipolla	7	6
7	(Italy) T Tenconi	3	6	6^{4}
Q	(Italy) G Naso	6	3	7
(Republic of Ireland) C Niland	2	1
(Argentina) S Decoud	6	6
(Kazakhstan) M Kukushkin	6	6
Q	(Chile) G Hormazabál	3	4
WC	(Italy) S Vagnozzi	7	2	4
2	(Brazil) M Daniel	5	6	6

Second round
Q	(Italy) A Brizzi	4	2	r
(Italy) P Lorenzi	6	4
(Germany) T Kamke	5	4
3	(Italy) F Cipolla	7	6
Q	(Italy) G Naso	3	2
(Argentina) S Decoud	6	6
(Kazakhstan) M Kukushkin	6^{3}	2
2	(Brazil) M Daniel	7	6

Quarterfinals
(Italy) P Lorenzi	6	6
3	(Italy) F Cipolla	1	2
(Argentina) S Decoud	6	6
2	(Brazil) M Daniel	3	1

Semifinals
(Italy) P Lorenzi	7	6
(Argentina) S Decoud	6^{6}	1
