= 2009 Camparini Gioielli Cup – Doubles =

Doubles
- 2009 Camparini Gioielli Cup

Final
- Champions: (Spain) Miguel Ángel López Jaén (Spain) Pere Riba
- Runners-up: (Italy) Gianluca Naso (Italy) Walter Trusendi
- Score: 6–4, 6–4

Events
Singles	Doubles
← 2008 ·	Camparini Gioielli Cup	· 2010 →

Chinese pair Yu Xin-yuan and Zeng Shao-Xuan was the defenders of title; however, they didn't start this year.
Miguel Ángel López Jaén and Pere Riba became the new champions, after their won against Gianluca Naso and Walter Trusendi in the final.

== Seeds ==
1. (Colombia) Juan Sebastián Cabal / (Brazil) Júlio Silva (quarterfinals)
2. (Poland) Tomasz Bednarek / (United States) Jim Thomas (quarterfinals)
3. (Germany) Denis Gremelmayr / (Italy) Simone Vagnozzi (first round)
4. (Canada) Pierre-Ludovic Duclos / (Brazil) Márcio Torres (first round)

== Draw ==
=== Key ===
- Q = Qualifier
- WC = Wild card
- LL = Lucky loser
- Alt = Alternate
- SE = Special exempt
- PR = Protected ranking
- ITF = ITF entry
- JE = Junior exempt
- w/o = Walkover
- r = Retired
- d = Defaulted
- SR = Special ranking

=== Draw ===
First round
1	(Colombia) JS Cabal (Brazil) J Silva
(Italy) Andrea Arnaboldi (Italy) A Brizzi	w/o
(Italy) P Lorenzi (Republic of Ireland) C Niland	2	3
(Italy) F Cipolla (Brazil) M Daniel	6	6
3	(Germany) D Gremelmayr (Italy) S Vagnozzi	6	4	[9]
(Italy) G Naso (Italy) W Trusendi	3	6	[11]
WC	(Spain) J Checa-Calvo (Chile) G Hormazabál
(France) J Ouanna (France) O Patience	w/o
WC	(Italy) T Fabbiano (Italy) M Trevisan	2	6	[11]
WC	(Switzerland) G Bastl (Slovakia) M Kližan	6	2	[9]
(Spain) MÁ López Jaén (Spain) P Riba	7	6
4	(Canada) P-L Duclos (Brazil) M Torres	5	3
(Kazakhstan) M Kukushkin (Russia) D Sitak	6	5	[3]
(Italy) D Bracciali (Italy) F Piccari	2	7	[10]
(Italy) S Galvani (Italy) T Tenconi	2	6	[8]
2	(Poland) T Bednarek (United States) J Thomas	6	3	[10]

Quarterfinals
1	(Colombia) JS Cabal (Brazil) J Silva	2	0
(Italy) F Cipolla (Brazil) M Daniel	6	6
(Italy) G Naso (Italy) W Trusendi	6	6
WC	(Spain) J Checa-Calvo (Chile) G Hormazabál	4	1
WC	(Italy) T Fabbiano (Italy) M Trevisan	6^{5}	5
(Spain) MÁ López Jaén (Spain) P Riba	7	7
(Italy) D Bracciali (Italy) F Piccari	7	6
2	(Poland) T Bednarek (United States) J Thomas	5	3

Semifinals
(Italy) F Cipolla (Brazil) M Daniel	4	2
(Italy) G Naso (Italy) W Trusendi	6	6
(Spain) MÁ López Jaén (Spain) P Riba	4	6	[13]
(Italy) D Bracciali (Italy) F Piccari	6	4	[11]

Finals
(Italy) G Naso (Italy) W Trusendi	4	4
(Spain) MÁ López Jaén (Spain) P Riba	6	6
