= Eleni Artymata =

Cypriot sprinter (born 1986)

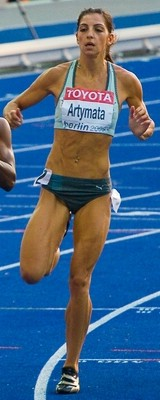
- Artymata at the 2009 World Championships

Personal information
- Born: 16 May 1986 (age 40) Paralimni, Cyprus
- Height: 1.77 m (5 ft 10 in)
- Weight: 59 kg (130 lb)

Sport
- Country: Cyprus
- Sport: Athletics
- Event(s): 100 metres, 200 metres, 400 metres
Medal record
Women's Athletics
Representing Cyprus
Mediterranean Games
Gold medal – first place	Pescara 2009	200 m
Gold medal – first place	Mersin 2013	200 m
Gold medal – first place	Tarragona 2018	400m
Silver medal – second place	Mersin 2013	4x100 m relay
Bronze medal – third place	Pescara 2009	100 m
Bronze medal – third place	Mersin 2013	100 m
Games of the Small States of Europe
Gold medal – first place	2005 Andorra	100 m
Gold medal – first place	2005 Andorra	200 m
Gold medal – first place	2005 Andorra	4x100 m relay
Gold medal – first place	2007 Monaco	100 m
Gold medal – first place	2007 Monaco	200 m
Gold medal – first place	2007 Monaco	4x100 m relay
Gold medal – first place	2009 Nicosia	100 m
Gold medal – first place	2009 Nicosia	200 m
Gold medal – first place	2009 Nicosia	4x100 m relay
- Updated on 22 July 2012

Eleni Artymata (Greek: Ελένη Αρτυματά, born 16 May 1986 in Paralimni) is a track and field sprint athlete, who competes internationally for Cyprus.

== Biography ==
Artymata represented Cyprus at the 2008 Summer Olympics in Beijing. She competed at the 200 metres, where she reached the second round. She won two medals, a gold in the 200 m and a bronze in the 100 m at the Mediterranean Games in Pescara. She also won two gold at the 2005 Games of the Small States of Europe.

At the 2009 World Athletics Championships, she reached the final of the 200 metres, where she finished 8th. She recorded her personal best in the 200 m of 22.64 seconds in the semi-finals of the same event.

At the 2010 European Championships in Barcelona. Artymata finished sixth in the final, improving her own national record to 22.61.

Later in 2010, at the Commonwealth Games in Delhi, India, Artymata was one of the favourites for the 200 metres title. She was the fastest qualifier in the heats in 23.23. However, she was disqualified after winning her semi final in 23.15, for running out of her lane. The final was won by Cydonie Mothersill in 22.89.

At the 2012 Summer Olympics, she reached the semi-finals of the 200 m. That year at the European Championships, she reached the final.

In 2013, Artymata won her second Mediterranean Games 200 metres title in Mersin. She had previously won in Pescara in 2009. Her third gold medal in the competition came in 2018 in Tarragona, this time in the 400 metres, in a National record time of 51.19, beating Italy's two-time European Champion Libania Grenot.

== Personal bests ==
Event	Time (seconds)	Venue	Date
100 metres	11.37	Berlin, Germany	16 August 2009
200 metres	22.61 NR	Barcelona, Spain	31 July 2010
400 metres	50.80 NR	Tokyo, Japan	4 August 2021
