= 2007 Davis Cup Europe/Africa Zone Group III – Zone A =

International tennis competition

The Europe/Africa Zone was one of the three zones of the regional Davis Cup competition in 2007.

In the Europe/Africa Zone there were four different tiers, called groups, in which teams competed against each other to advance to the upper tier. Group III was split into two tournaments. One tournament was held in Smash Tennis Academy, Cairo, Egypt, May 9–13, on outdoor clay courts, while the other was held in Avenir Sportif de la Marsa, Tunis, Tunisia, May 9–13, also on outdoor clay courts.

On the occasion of the round-robin match against Egypt, the San Marino team was forced to call up only two players due to the lack of alternatives, with the 66-year-old captain then, Vittorio Pellandra, adding his name to the list of players to reach the minimum allowed of three players. With one of his players unable to take part in the doubles, it was Pellandra who took the field. He thereby set the new record as the oldest Davis Cup player despite a leg problem that forced him to retire after just 10 minutes of play.

== Format ==
The eight teams in the Cairo tournament were split into two pools and played in a round-robin format. The top two teams of each pool advanced to the promotion pool, from which the two top teams were promoted to the Europe/Africa Zone Group II in 2008. The bottom two teams of each group were placed in the relegation pool, from which the two bottom teams were demoted to the Europe/Africa Zone Group IV in 2008.

== Pool A ==
	Pool A	IRL	LTU	MDA	BIH
1	Ireland (3–0)		2–1	3–0	3–0
2	Lithuania (2–1)	1–2		2–1	2–1
3	Moldova (1–2)	0–3	1–2		2–1
4	Bosnia and Herzegovina (0–3)	0–3	1–2	1–2	

=== Lithuania vs. Ireland ===
Lithuania
1
Smash Tennis Academy, Cairo, Egypt
9 May 2007
Clay

Ireland
2

			1	2	3
1	(Lithuania) (Republic of Ireland)	Ričardas Berankis; Conor Niland	6^{5} 7^{7}	0; 6
2	(Lithuania) (Republic of Ireland)	Gvidas Sabeckis; Louk Sorensen	0; 6	2; 6
3	(Lithuania) (Republic of Ireland)	Daniel Lencina-Ribes / Gvidas Sabeckis; John McGahon / Kevin Sorensen	7^{8} 6^{6}	7^{7} 6^{2}

=== Bosnia and Herzegovina vs. Moldova ===
Bosnia and Herzegovina
1
Smash Tennis Academy, Cairo, Egypt
9 May 2007
Clay

Moldova
2

			1	2	3
1	(Bosnia and Herzegovina) (Moldova)	Uglješa Ostojić; Roman Tudoreanu	4; 6	0; 6
2	(Bosnia and Herzegovina) (Moldova)	Aleksandar Marić; Andrei Ciumac	2; 6	3; 6
3	(Bosnia and Herzegovina) (Moldova)	Mirza Bašić / Zlatan Kadrić; Radu Albot / Evghenii Plugariov	6; 3	3; 6	6; 3

=== Lithuania vs. Bosnia and Herzegovina ===
Lithuania
2
Smash Tennis Academy, Cairo, Egypt
10 May 2007
Clay

Bosnia and Herzegovina
1

			1	2	3
1	(Lithuania) (Bosnia and Herzegovina)	Daniel Lencina-Ribes; Mirza Bašić	7^{7} 6^{5}	6; 1
2	(Lithuania) (Bosnia and Herzegovina)	Ričardas Berankis; Zlatan Kadrić	6; 1	7^{7} 6^{4}
3	(Lithuania) (Bosnia and Herzegovina)	Ričardas Berankis / Gvidas Sabeckis; Mirza Bašić / Uglješa Ostojić	3; 6	3; 6

=== Moldova vs. Ireland ===
Moldova
0
Smash Tennis Academy, Cairo, Egypt
10 May 2007
Clay

Ireland
3

			1	2	3
1	(Moldova) (Republic of Ireland)	Radu Albot; Conor Niland	0; 6	0; 6
2	(Moldova) (Republic of Ireland)	Andrei Ciumac; Louk Sorensen	2; 6	3; 6
3	(Moldova) (Republic of Ireland)	Radu Albot / Roman Tudoreanu; John McGahon / Kevin Sorensen	3; 6	1; 6

=== Lithuania vs. Moldova ===
Lithuania
2
Smash Tennis Academy, Cairo, Egypt
11 May 2007
Clay

Moldova
1

			1	2	3
1	(Lithuania) (Moldova)	Daniel Lencina-Ribes; Roman Tudoreanu	3; 6	6; 3	6; 0
2	(Lithuania) (Moldova)	Ričardas Berankis; Andrei Ciumac	6; 4	6; 0
3	(Lithuania) (Moldova)	Simas Kučas / Gvidas Sabeckis; Radu Albot / Evghenii Plugariov	7^{7} 6^{0}	4; 6	3; 6

=== Bosnia and Herzegovina vs. Ireland ===
Bosnia and Herzegovina
0
Smash Tennis Academy, Cairo, Egypt
11 May 2007
Clay

Ireland
3

			1	2	3
1	(Bosnia and Herzegovina) (Republic of Ireland)	Zlatan Kadrić; Conor Niland	2; 6	4; 6
2	(Bosnia and Herzegovina) (Republic of Ireland)	Aleksandar Marić; Louk Sorensen	2; 6	2; 6
3	(Bosnia and Herzegovina) (Republic of Ireland)	Mirza Bašić / Uglješa Ostojić; John McGahon / Kevin Sorensen	3; 6	4; 6

== Pool B ==
	Pool B	EGY	TUR	SMR	ISL
1	Egypt (3–0)		2–1	3–0	3–0
2	Turkey (2–1)	1–2		3–0	2–1
3	San Marino (1–2)	0–3	0–3		2–1
4	Iceland (0–3)	0–3	1–2	1–2	

=== Turkey vs. San Marino ===
Turkey
3
Smash Tennis Academy, Cairo, Egypt
9 May 2007
Clay

San Marino
0

			1	2	3
1	(Turkey) (San Marino)	Haluk Akkoyun; Domenico Vicini	6; 4	6; 0
2	(Turkey) (San Marino)	Marsel İlhan; William Forcellini	6; 0	6; 1
3	(Turkey) (San Marino)	Haluk Akkoyun / Ergün Zorlu; William Forcellini / Domenico Vicini	6; 0	6; 2

=== Egypt vs. Iceland ===
Egypt
3
Smash Tennis Academy, Cairo, Egypt
9 May 2007
Clay

Iceland
0

			1	2	3
1	(Egypt) (Iceland)	Karim Maamoun; Andri Jonsson	6; 0	6; 1
2	(Egypt) (Iceland)	Mohamed Mamoun; Arnar Sigurðsson	6; 1	6; 2
3	(Egypt) (Iceland)	Karim Maamoun / Mohamed Mamoun; Arnar Sigurðsson / Davíð Halldórsson	6; 4	6; 0

=== Turkey vs. Egypt ===
Turkey
1
Smash Tennis Academy, Cairo, Egypt
10 May 2007
Clay

Egypt
2

			1	2	3
1	(Turkey) (Egypt)	Marsel İlhan; Karim Maamoun	4; 6	3; 6
2	(Turkey) (Egypt)	Ergün Zorlu; Mohamed Mamoun	3; 6	5; 7
3	(Turkey) (Egypt)	Haluk Akkoyun / Ergün Zorlu; Karim Maamoun / Mohamed Mamoun	4; 6	6; 2	6; 4

=== Iceland vs. San Marino ===
Iceland
1
Smash Tennis Academy, Cairo, Egypt
10 May 2007
Clay

San Marino
2

			1	2	3
1	(Iceland) (San Marino)	Andri Jonsson; Domenico Vicini	0; 6	0; 6
2	(Iceland) (San Marino)	Arnar Sigurðsson; William Forcellini	6; 1	6; 4
3	(Iceland) (San Marino)	Andri Jonsson / Arnar Sigurðsson; William Forcellini / Domenico Vicini	4; 6	6^{5} 7^{7}

=== Turkey vs. Iceland ===
Turkey
2
Smash Tennis Academy, Cairo, Egypt
11 May 2007
Clay

Iceland
1

			1	2	3
1	(Turkey) (Iceland)	Marsel İlhan; Jón Axel Jónsson	6; 0	6; 0
2	(Turkey) (Iceland)	Ergün Zorlu; Arnar Sigurðsson	2; 6	6; 3	5; 7
3	(Turkey) (Iceland)	Alaatin Bora Gerçeker / Marsel İlhan; Jón Axel Jónsson / Arnar Sigurðsson	6; 0	6; 4

=== Egypt vs. San Marino ===
Egypt
3
Smash Tennis Academy, Cairo, Egypt
11 May 2007
Clay

San Marino
0

			1	2	3
1	(Egypt) (San Marino)	Omar Hedayet; Domenico Vicini	6; 1	6; 3
2	(Egypt) (San Marino)	Mohamed Mamoun; William Forcellini	6; 0	6; 1
3	(Egypt) (San Marino)	Omar Hedayet / Ahmed Shebl Morsy; Domenico Vicini / Vittorio Pellandra	2; 1			retired

== Promotion pool ==
The top two teams from each of Pools A and B advanced to the Promotion pool. Results and points from games against the opponent from the preliminary round were carried forward.

(scores in italics carried over from Groups)

	1st–4th Play-off	IRL	EGY	LTU	TUR
1	Ireland (3–0)		3–0	2–1	2–1
2	Egypt (2–1)	0–3		2–1	2–1
3	Lithuania (1–2)	1–2	1–2		2–1
4	Turkey (0–3)	1–2	1–2	1–2	

Ireland and Egypt promoted to Group II in 2008.

=== Turkey vs. Lithuania ===
Turkey
1
Smash Tennis Academy, Cairo, Egypt
12 May 2007
Clay

Lithuania
2

			1	2	3
1	(Turkey) (Lithuania)	Marsel İlhan; Daniel Lencina-Ribes	3; 6	6; 2	6; 3
2	(Turkey) (Lithuania)	Ergün Zorlu; Ričardas Berankis	0; 6	6^{3} 7^{7}
3	(Turkey) (Lithuania)	Haluk Akkoyun / Ergün Zorlu; Daniel Lencina-Ribes / Gvidas Sabeckis	2; 6	6^{3} 7^{7}

=== Egypt vs. Ireland ===
Egypt
0
Smash Tennis Academy, Cairo, Egypt
12 May 2007
Clay

Ireland
3

			1	2	3
1	(Egypt) (Republic of Ireland)	Karim Maamoun; Conor Niland	4; 6	1; 6
2	(Egypt) (Republic of Ireland)	Mohamed Mamoun; Louk Sorensen	2; 6	5; 7
3	(Egypt) (Republic of Ireland)	Karim Maamoun / Mohamed Mamoun; John McGahon / Kevin Sorensen	7^{7} 6^{3}	3; 6	2; 2	retired

=== Turkey vs. Ireland ===
Turkey
1
Smash Tennis Academy, Cairo, Egypt
13 May 2007
Clay

Ireland
2

			1	2	3
1	(Turkey) (Republic of Ireland)	Haluk Akkoyun; Kevin Sorensen	4; 6	6^{5} 7^{7}
2	(Turkey) (Republic of Ireland)	Ergün Zorlu; John McGahon	2; 6	6; 3	13; 11
3	(Turkey) (Republic of Ireland)	Haluk Akkoyun / Ergün Zorlu; John McGahon / Kevin Sorensen	6^{8} 7^{10}	1; 6

=== Lithuania vs. Egypt ===
Lithuania
1
Smash Tennis Academy, Cairo, Egypt
13 May 2007
Clay

Egypt
2

			1	2	3
1	(Lithuania) (Egypt)	Ričardas Berankis; Karim Maamoun	5; 7	6^{13} 7^{15}
2	(Lithuania) (Egypt)	Gvidas Sabeckis; Mohamed Mamoun	4; 6	4; 6
3	(Lithuania) (Egypt)	Simas Kučas / Daniel Lencina-Ribes; Omar Hedayet / Ahmed Shebl Morsy	7^{7} 6^{5}	7; 5

== Relegation pool ==
The bottom two teams from Pools A and B were placed in the relegation group. Results and points from games against the opponent from the preliminary round were carried forward.

(scores in italics carried over from Groups)

	5th–8th Play-off	MDA	BIH	SMR	ISL
1	Moldova (3–0)		2–1	3–0	2–1
2	Bosnia and Herzegovina (2–1)	1–2		3–0	3–0
3	San Marino (1–2)	0–3	0–3		2–1
4	Iceland (0–3)	1–2	0–3	1–2	

San Marino and Iceland relegated to Group IV in 2008.

=== Bosnia and Herzegovina vs. Iceland ===
Bosnia and Herzegovina
3
Smash Tennis Academy, Cairo, Egypt
12 May 2007
Clay

Iceland
0

			1	2	3
1	(Bosnia and Herzegovina) (Iceland)	Mirza Bašić; Jón Axel Jónsson	6; 1	6; 1
2	(Bosnia and Herzegovina) (Iceland)	Aleksandar Marić; Arnar Sigurðsson	5; 7	7^{7} 6^{1}	7; 5
3	(Bosnia and Herzegovina) (Iceland)	Zlatan Kadrić / Uglješa Ostojić; Davíð Halldórsson / Andri Jonsson	6; 2	6; 1

=== Moldova vs. San Marino ===
Moldova
3
Smash Tennis Academy, Cairo, Egypt
12 May 2007
Clay

San Marino
0

			1	2	3
1	(Moldova) (San Marino)	Radu Albot; Domenico Vicini	7; 5	6^{6} 7^{8}	6; 3
2	(Moldova) (San Marino)	Roman Tudoreanu; William Forcellini	6; 2	6; 2
3	(Moldova) (San Marino)	Radu Albot / Andrei Ciumac; William Forcellini / Domenico Vicini	2; 1			retired

=== Bosnia and Herzegovina vs. San Marino ===
Bosnia and Herzegovina
3
Smash Tennis Academy, Cairo, Egypt
13 May 2007
Clay

San Marino
0

			1	2	3
1	(Bosnia and Herzegovina) (San Marino)	Uglješa Ostojić; Domenico Vicini	6; 2	6; 1
2	(Bosnia and Herzegovina) (San Marino)	Aleksandar Marić; William Forcellini	6; 0	6; 0
3	(Bosnia and Herzegovina) (San Marino)	Zlatan Kadrić / Uglješa Ostojić; William Forcellini / Domenico Vicini				w/o

=== Iceland vs. Moldova ===
Iceland
1
Smash Tennis Academy, Cairo, Egypt
13 May 2007
Clay

Moldova
2

			1	2	3
1	(Iceland) (Moldova)	Andri Jonsson; Roman Tudoreanu	2; 6	2; 6
2	(Iceland) (Moldova)	Jón Axel Jónsson; Andrei Ciumac	0; 6	0; 6
3	(Iceland) (Moldova)	Davíð Halldórsson / Arnar Sigurðsson; Andrei Ciumac / Roman Tudoreanu	7; 5	6; 2

== Final standings ==
Rank	Team
1	Ireland
2	Egypt
3	Lithuania
4	Turkey
5	Moldova
6	Bosnia and Herzegovina
7	San Marino
8	Iceland

- Ireland and Egypt promoted to Group II in 2008.
- San Marino and Iceland relegated to Group IV in 2008.
