= Marina Novak =

Liechtenstein tennis player

- Full name: Marina Sina Novak
- Country (sports): Liechtenstein
- Born: 30 May 1991 (age 33)
- Plays: Right (two-handed backhand)
- Prize money: $1,496

Singles
- Career record: 2–11

Doubles
- Career record: 3–6
- Highest ranking: No. 988 (8 June 2009)

Team competitions
- Fed Cup: 16–9
Medal record
Games of the Small States of Europe
| Bronze medal – third place | 2007 Monaco | Singles |
| Silver medal – second place | 2007 Monaco | Doubles |
| Bronze medal – third place | 2009 Cyprus | Singles |
| Silver medal – second place | 2009 Cyprus | Doubles |

Marina Novak (born 30 May 1991) is a former professional tennis player from Liechtenstein.

On 8 June 2009, she peaked at No. 988 in the doubles rankings. Playing for Liechtenstein Fed Cup team, Novak has a win–loss record of 16–9.

== Career ==
Novak had a successful junior career, winning one ITF doubles title. Her career-high world ranking as a junior was 454, and she finished her junior career with a record of 36–33. At the 2007 Games of the Small States of Europe, held in Liechtenstein, Novak won two medals. She won the 2009 Games of the Small States of Europe, Novak won a singles bronze and a doubles silver medal.

== Fed Cup participation ==
=== Singles (10–5) ===
| Edition | Date | Location | Against | Surface | Opponent | W/L | Score |
|---|---|---|---|---|---|---|---|
| 2006 Fed Cup; Europe/Africa Zone Group III | 26 April 2006 | Antalya, Turkey | (Bosnia and Herzegovina) Bosnia and Herzegovina | Clay | (Bosnia and Herzegovina) Dijana Stojić | L | 3–6, 1–6 |
| 2006 Fed Cup; Europe/Africa Zone Group III | 27 April 2006 | Antalya, Turkey | Namibia | Clay | (Namibia) Elrien De Villiers | W | 6–3, 4–6, 6–4 |
| 2006 Fed Cup; Europe/Africa Zone Group III | 28 April 2006 | Antalya, Turkey | Egypt | Clay | (Egypt) Magy Aziz | L | 2–6, 0–3 ret. |
| 2006 Fed Cup; Europe/Africa Zone Group III | 29 April 2006 | Antalya, Turkey | Azerbaijan | Clay | (Azerbaijan) Sevil Aliyeva | W | 6–4, 6–2 |
| 2007 Fed Cup; Europe/Africa Zone Group III | 23 April 2007 | Phoenix, Mauritius | Turkey | Hard | (Turkey) Çağla Büyükakçay | L | 4–6, 2–6 |
| 2007 Fed Cup; Europe/Africa Zone Group III | 24 April 2007 | Phoenix, Mauritius | Mauritius | Hard | (Mauritius) Astrid Tixier | W | 6–4, 6–4 |
| 2007 Fed Cup; Europe/Africa Zone Group III | 25 April 2007 | Phoenix, Mauritius | Egypt | Hard | (Egypt) Aliaa Fakhry | W | 6–3, 1–6, 13–11 |
| 2007 Fed Cup; Europe/Africa Zone Group III | 26 April 2007 | Phoenix, Mauritius | Azerbaijan | Hard | (Azerbaijan) Sayyara Mammadova | W | 6–0, 6–0 |
| 2009 Fed Cup; Europe/Africa Zone Group III | 21 April 2009 | Marsa, Malta | Norway | Hard | (Norway) Helene Auensen | L | 1–6, 4–6 |
| 2009 Fed Cup; Europe/Africa Zone Group III | 22 April 2009 | Marsa, Malta | Armenia | Hard | (Armenia) Liudmila Nikoyan | W | 7–6^{(8–6)}, 2–6, 6–1 |
| 2009 Fed Cup; Europe/Africa Zone Group III | 23 April 2009 | Marsa, Malta | Egypt | Hard | (Egypt) Magy Aziz | W | 7–5, 6–4 |
| 2009 Fed Cup; Europe/Africa Zone Group III | 24 April 2009 | Marsa, Malta | Iceland | Hard | (Iceland) Eirdís Ragnarsdóttir | W | 6–0, 6–0 |
| 2009 Fed Cup; Europe/Africa Zone Group III | 25 April 2009 | Marsa, Malta | Moldova | Hard | (Moldova) Olga Zaicenco | W | 6–1, 6–1 |
| 2010 Fed Cup; Europe/Africa Zone Group II | 30 April 2010 | Yerevan, Armenia | Luxembourg | Clay | (Luxembourg) Anne Kremer | L | 3–6, 1–6 |
| 2010 Fed Cup; Europe/Africa Zone Group II | 1 May 2010 | Yerevan, Armenia | Norway | Clay | (Norway) Emma Flood | W | 7–6^{(7–2)}, 6–1 |

=== Doubles (6–4) ===
| Edition | Date | Location | Against | Surface | Partner | Opponents | W/L | Score |
|---|---|---|---|---|---|---|---|---|
| 2007 Fed Cup; Europe/Africa Zone Group III | 23 April 2007 | Phoenix, Mauritius | Turkey | Hard | (Liechtenstein) Stephanie Vogt | (Turkey) Pemra Özgen (Turkey) İpek Şenoğlu | L | 0–6, 1–6 |
| 2007 Fed Cup; Europe/Africa Zone Group III | 24 April 2007 | Phoenix, Mauritius | Mauritius | Hard | (Liechtenstein) Stephanie Vogt | (Mauritius) Marinne Giraud (Mauritius) Astrid Tixier | W | 7–6^{(7–3)}, 7–6^{(8–6)} |
| 2007 Fed Cup; Europe/Africa Zone Group III | 26 April 2007 | Phoenix, Mauritius | Azerbaijan | Hard | (Liechtenstein) Stephanie Vogt | (Azerbaijan) Sevil Aliyeva (Azerbaijan) Sayyara Mammadova | W | w/o |
| 2009 Fed Cup; Europe/Africa Zone Group III | 21 April 2009 | Marsa, Malta | Norway | Hard | (Liechtenstein) Kathinka von Deichmann | (Norway) Helene Auensen (Norway) Ulrikke Eikeri | W | 0–6, 6–1, [10–8] |
| 2009 Fed Cup; Europe/Africa Zone Group III | 22 April 2009 | Marsa, Malta | Armenia | Hard | (Liechtenstein) Kathinka von Deichmann | (Armenia) Anna Movsisyan (Armenia) Liudmila Nikoyan | L | 3–6, 1–6 |
| 2009 Fed Cup; Europe/Africa Zone Group III | 23 April 2009 | Marsa, Malta | Egypt | Hard | (Liechtenstein) Kathinka von Deichmann | (Egypt) Magy Aziz (Egypt) Nihal Tarek-Saleh | W | 7–6^{(9–7)}, 5–7, [11–9] |
| 2009 Fed Cup; Europe/Africa Zone Group III | 24 April 2009 | Marsa, Malta | Iceland | Hard | (Liechtenstein) Kathinka von Deichmann | (Iceland) Sandra Kristjánsdóttir (Iceland) Eirdís Ragnarsdóttir | W | 6–0, 6–1 |
| 2009 Fed Cup; Europe/Africa Zone Group III | 25 April 2009 | Marsa, Malta | Moldova | Hard | (Liechtenstein) Kathinka von Deichmann | (Moldova) Olga Terteac (Moldova) Olga Zaicenco | W | 6–2, 6–1 |
| 2010 Fed Cup; Europe/Africa Zone Group II | 28 April 2010 | Yerevan, Armenia | Greece | Clay | (Liechtenstein) Stephanie Vogt | (Greece) Eirini Georgatou (Greece) Despina Papamichail | L | 3–6, 6–4, [9–11] |
| 2010 Fed Cup; Europe/Africa Zone Group II | 30 April 2010 | Yerevan, Armenia | South Africa | Clay | (Liechtenstein) Kathinka von Deichmann | (South Africa) Christi Potgieter (South Africa) Chanel Simmonds | L | 6–7^{(0–7)}, 3–6 |

== Junior career finals ==
=== ITF Circuit ===
==== Doubles (1–1) ====
Legend
Category G1
Category G2
Category G3
Category G4
Category G5

| Result | Date | Tournament | Location | Surface | Partner | Opponents | Score |
|---|---|---|---|---|---|---|---|
| Win | 8 September 2007 | Aphrodite Cup | Nicosia, Cyprus | Clay | (Slovakia) Petra Kulhova | (Hungary) Tímea Babos (Cyprus) Daniella Kyprianidou | 7–6^{(7–3)}, 6–2 |
| Loss | 3 November 2007 | Toyota Open | Nonthaburi, Thailand | Hard | (Switzerland) Muriel Wacker | (Hungary) Tímea Babos (Hungary) Réka Luca Jani | 1–6, 0–6 |

== Other finals ==
=== Doubles ===
| Outcome | Date | Tournament | Location | Partnered | Opponents | Score |
|---|---|---|---|---|---|---|
| silver | June 2007 | Games of the Small States of Europe | Monaco City | (Liechtenstein) Stephanie Vogt | (Luxembourg) Mandy Minella (Luxembourg) Lynn Philippe | 0–6, 5–7 |
| silver | June 2009 | Games of the Small States of Europe | Nicosia, Cyprus | (Liechtenstein) Kathinka von Deichmann | (Luxembourg) Mandy Minella (Luxembourg) Claudine Schaul | w/o |
