= Tennis at the 2009 Games of the Small States of Europe =

- Date: 2–6 June 2009
- Location: National Tennis Centre, Nicosia, Cyprus

Champions

Men's singles
- Jean-René Lisnard (MON)

Women's singles
- Mandy Minella (LUX)

Men's doubles
- Guillaume Couillard / Jean-René Lisnard (MON)

Women's doubles
- Mandy Minella / Claudine Schaul (LUX)
← 2007 ·	Games of the Small States of Europe	· 2011 →

Tennis competitions at the 2009 Games of the Small States of Europe in Cyprus were held 2–6 June 2009 at the National Tennis Centre in Nicosia. The Plexicushion surface rendered the event a hardcourt tournament.

== Medal summary ==
=== Medal table ===
Rank	Nation	Gold	Silver	Bronze	Total
1	Monaco (MON)	2	1	1	4
2	Luxembourg (LUX)	2	1	0	3
3	Liechtenstein (LIE)	0	1	3	4
4	San Marino (SMR)	0	1	1	2
5	Andorra (AND)	0	0	1	1
5	Iceland (ISL)	0	0	1	1
5	Malta (MLT)	0	0	1	1
Totals (7 entries)		4	4	8	16

=== Events ===
Event	Gold	Silver	Bronze
Men's singles	(Monaco) Jean-René Lisnard	(Monaco) Benjamin Balleret	(Liechtenstein) Jirka Lokaj
Men's singles	(Monaco) Jean-René Lisnard	(Monaco) Benjamin Balleret	(San Marino) Stefano Galvani
Men's doubles	(Monaco) Jean-René Lisnard and Guillaume Couillard	(San Marino) Domenico Vicini and Stefano Galvani	(Iceland) Arnar Sigurdsson and Birkir Gunnarsson
Men's doubles	(Monaco) Jean-René Lisnard and Guillaume Couillard	(San Marino) Domenico Vicini and Stefano Galvani	(Andorra) Jordi Vila-Vila and Jean-Baptiste Poux-Gautier
Women's singles	(Luxembourg) Mandy Minella	(Luxembourg) Claudine Schaul	(Liechtenstein) Marina Novak
Women's singles	(Luxembourg) Mandy Minella	(Luxembourg) Claudine Schaul	(Liechtenstein) Kathinka von Deichmann
Women's doubles	(Luxembourg) Mandy Minella and Claudine Schaul	(Liechtenstein) Marina Novak and Kathinka von Deichmann	(Malta) Kimberley Cassar and Elaine Genovese
Women's doubles	(Luxembourg) Mandy Minella and Claudine Schaul	(Liechtenstein) Marina Novak and Kathinka von Deichmann	(Monaco) Emilia Milovanovic and Louise-Alice Gambarini
