= Tennis at the 2009 Games of the Small States of Europe – Women's singles =

Women's singles
- Tennis at the 2009 Games of the Small States of Europe

Events
Singles	men	women
Doubles	men	women
← 2007 ·	Games of the Small States of Europe	· 2011 →

The women's singles was one of four events of the tennis program at the 2009 Games of the Small States of Europe in Cyprus.

== Medalists ==
Gold	(Luxembourg) Mandy Minella
Silver	(Luxembourg) Claudine Schaul
Bronze	(Liechtenstein) Marina Novak
Bronze	(Liechtenstein) Kathinka von Deichmann

== Seeds ==
1. (Luxembourg) Mandy Minella (champion, gold medalist)
2. (Luxembourg) Claudine Schaul (final, silver medalist)
3. (Liechtenstein) Marina Novak (semifinals, bronze medalist)
4. (Cyprus) Marilena Papadopoulou (first round)

== Draw ==
=== Key ===
- Q = Qualifier
- WC = Wild card
- LL = Lucky loser
- Alt = Alternate
- SE = Special exempt
- PR = Protected ranking
- ITF = ITF entry
- JE = Junior exempt
- w/o = Walkover
- r = Retired
- d = Defaulted
- SR = Special ranking

First round
(Malta) Kimberley Cassar	6	6
(Cyprus) Daniella Kyprianidou	0	2
(Monaco) Emilia Milovanovic	6	6
(Iceland) Sandra Kritjansdottir	1	0
(Liechtenstein) Kathinka von Deichmann	6	6
(Iceland) Rebekka Petursdottir	0	0
4	(Cyprus) Marilena Papadopoulou	3	3
(Monaco) Louise-Alice Gambarini	6	6

Second round
1	(Luxembourg) Mandy Minella	6	6
(Malta) Kimberley Cassar	0	2
3	(Liechtenstein) Marina Novak	6	6
(Monaco) Emilia Milovanovic	1	1
(Liechtenstein) Kathinka von Deichmann	6	6
(Malta) Elaine Genovese	2	4
(Monaco) Louise-Alice Gambarini	3	3
2	(Luxembourg) Claudine Schaul	6	6

Semifinals
1	(Luxembourg) Mandy Minella	6	6
3	(Liechtenstein) Marina Novak	2	1
(Liechtenstein) Kathinka von Deichmann	3	3
2	(Luxembourg) Claudine Schaul	6	6

Final
1	(Luxembourg) Mandy Minella	6	6
2	(Luxembourg) Claudine Schaul	3	4
