= Tennis at the 2009 Games of the Small States of Europe – Women's doubles =

Women's doubles
- Tennis at the 2009 Games of the Small States of Europe

Events
Singles	men	women
Doubles	men	women
← 2007 ·	Games of the Small States of Europe	· 2011 →

The women's doubles was one of four events of the tennis program at the 2009 Games of the Small States of Europe in Cyprus.

== Medalists ==
Gold	(Luxembourg) Mandy Minella / Claudine Schaul
Silver	(Liechtenstein) Marina Novak / Kathinka von Deichmann
Bronze	(Malta) Kimberley Cassar / Elaine Genovese
Bronze	(Monaco) Emilia Milovanovic / Louise-Alice Gambarini

== Seeds ==
1. (Luxembourg) Mandy Minella / Claudine Schaul (champions, gold medalists)
2. (Liechtenstein) Marina Novak / Kathinka von Deichmann (final, silver medalists)
3. (Cyprus) Marilena Papadopoulou / Ioanna-Nena Savva (first round)
4. (Monaco) Emilia Milovanovic / Louise-Alice Gambarini (semifinals, bronze medalistS)

== Draw ==
=== Key ===
- Q = Qualifier
- WC = Wild card
- LL = Lucky loser
- Alt = Alternate
- ITF = ITF entry
- PR = Protected ranking
- SR = Special ranking
- SE = Special exempt
- JE = Junior exempt
- JR = Junior Accelerator Programme entrant
- CO = College Accelerator Programme entrant
- NG = Next Gen Accelerator Program entrant
- w/o = Walkover
- r = Retired
- d = Defaulted

First round
1	(Luxembourg) Mandy Minella (Luxembourg) Claudine Schaul
bye
(Iceland) Rebekka Petursdottir (Iceland) Sandra Kritjansdottir	1	0
4	(Monaco) Emilia Milovanovic (Monaco) Louise-Alice Gambarini	6	6
(Malta) Kimberley Cassar (Malta) Elaine Genovese	6	6
3	(Cyprus) Marilena Papadopoulou (Cyprus) Daniella Kyprianidou	1	2
bye
2	(Liechtenstein) Marina Novak (Liechtenstein) Kathinka von Deichmann

Semifinals
1	(Luxembourg) Mandy Minella (Luxembourg) Claudine Schaul	6	6
(Monaco) Emilia Milovanovic (Monaco) Louise-Alice Gambarini	0	0
(Malta) Kimberley Cassar (Malta) Elaine Genovese	6	5	6
2	(Liechtenstein) Marina Novak (Liechtenstein) Kathinka von Deichmann	2	7	2

Final
1	(Luxembourg) Mandy Minella (Luxembourg) Claudine Schaul
2	(Liechtenstein) Marina Novak (Liechtenstein) Kathinka von Deichmann	w/o
