= 2010 Camparini Gioielli Cup – Singles =

Singles
- 2010 Camparini Gioielli Cup

Final
- Champion: (Argentina) Carlos Berlocq
- Runner-up: (Spain) Pablo Andújar
- Score: 6–0, 7–6(1)

Events
Singles	Doubles
← 2009 ·	Camparini Gioielli Cup	· 2011 →

Paolo Lorenzi was the defending champion, but he chose to compete at Wimbledon instead.
Carlos Berlocq won the final 6–0, 7–6(1) against Pablo Andújar.

== Seeds ==
1. (Italy) Filippo Volandri (quarterfinals)
2. (Brazil) Thiago Alves (second round)
3. (Austria) Daniel Köllerer (quarterfinals)
4. (Italy) Simone Bolelli (first round)
5. (Spain) Pablo Andújar (final)
6. (United States) Kevin Kim (second round)
7. (Argentina) Federico Delbonis (semifinals)
8. (France) Josselin Ouanna (first round)

== Draw ==
=== Key ===
- Q = Qualifier
- WC = Wild card
- LL = Lucky loser
- Alt = Alternate
- SE = Special exempt
- PR = Protected ranking
- ITF = ITF entry
- JE = Junior exempt
- w/o = Walkover
- r = Retired
- d = Defaulted
- SR = Special ranking

=== Finals ===
Semifinals
(Romania) Adrian Ungur	0	4
(Argentina) Carlos Berlocq	6	6
7	(Argentina) Federico Delbonis	1	0
5	(Spain) Pablo Andújar	6	6

Final
(Argentina) Carlos Berlocq	6	7
5	(Spain) Pablo Andújar	0	6^{1}

=== Top half ===
First round
1	(Italy) F Volandri	7	6
Q	(Austria) M Slanar	5	4
(France) J Veigy	6	6
SE	(Romania) M Copil	2	0
(Morocco) R El Amrani	2	6	6^{5}
(Romania) A Ungur	6	3	7
WC	(Italy) F Gaio	6	4	7
8	(France) J Ouanna	4	6	6^{6}
4	(Italy) S Bolelli	2	1
(Argentina) C Berlocq	6	6
Q	(Brazil) R Hocevar	7	7
SE	(Argentina) F Bagnis	5	6^{2}
(Chile) P Capdeville	1	6	6
(United States) A Bogomolov	6	4	3
(Austria) P Oswald	6	4	3
6	(United States) K Kim	2	6	6

Second round
1	(Italy) F Volandri	7	6
(France) J Veigy	6^{3}	3
(Romania) A Ungur	6	6
WC	(Italy) F Gaio	1	4
(Argentina) C Berlocq	6	6
Q	(Brazil) R Hocevar	1	1
(Chile) P Capdeville	6	6
6	(United States) K Kim	1	2

Quarterfinals
1	(Italy) F Volandri	6	2	0
(Romania) A Ungur	3	6	6
(Argentina) C Berlocq	6	7
(Chile) P Capdeville	1	6^{2}

Semifinals
(Romania) A Ungur	0	4
(Argentina) C Berlocq	6	6

=== Bottom half ===
First round
7	(Argentina) F Delbonis	6	7
(Monaco) B Balleret	1	6^{5}
(Italy) A di Mauro	6	3	r
(Argentina) D Junqueira	4	6
(Belarus) U Ignatik	4	4
WC	(Italy) F Cipolla	6	6
(Brazil) J Silva	2	3
3	(Austria) D Köllerer	6	6
5	(Spain) P Andújar	6	6
Q	(Italy) A Brizzi	4	2
(France) L Recouderc	4	0
(Canada) P Polansky	6	6
WC	(Italy) T Fabbiano	4	7	7
WC	(Italy) D Giorgini	6	6^{5}	6^{5}
Q	(Italy) W Trusendi	4	2
2	(Brazil) T Alves	6	6

Second round
7	(Argentina) F Delbonis	6	6
(Argentina) D Junqueira	3	1
WC	(Italy) F Cipolla	6	4	4
3	(Austria) D Köllerer	4	6	6
5	(Spain) P Andújar	6	6
(Canada) P Polansky	4	3
WC	(Italy) T Fabbiano	6	7
2	(Brazil) T Alves	3	6^{6}

Quarterfinals
7	(Argentina) F Delbonis	6^{1}	6	7
3	(Austria) D Köllerer	7	2	6^{3}
5	(Spain) P Andújar	3	6	6
WC	(Italy) T Fabbiano	6	4	4

Semifinals
7	(Argentina) F Delbonis	1	0
5	(Spain) P Andújar	6	6
