= 2009 Camparini Gioielli Cup =

- Date: June 22 – June 28
- Edition: 9th
- Location: Reggio Emilia, Italy

Champions

Singles
- (Italy) Paolo Lorenzi

Doubles
- (Spain) Miguel Ángel López Jaén / (Spain) Pere Riba
← 2008 ·	Camparini Gioielli Cup	· 2010 →

The 2009 Camparini Gioielli Cup was a professional tennis tournament played on outdoor red clay courts. It was part of the 2009 ATP Challenger Tour. It took place in Reggio Emilia, Italy between 22 and 28 June 2009.

== Singles entrants ==
=== Seeds ===
Nationality	Player	Ranking*	Seeding
CHI	Nicolás Massú	103	1
BRA	Marcos Daniel	105	2
ITA	Flavio Cipolla	107	3
FRA	Mathieu Montcourt	108	4
FRA	Josselin Ouanna	121	5
ESP	Pere Riba	142	6
ITA	Tomas Tenconi	150	7
GER	Denis Gremelmayr	151	8

- Rankings are as of June 15, 2009.

=== Other entrants ===
The following players received wildcards into the singles main draw:

- (Italy) Daniele Bracciali
- (Italy) Matteo Trevisan
- (Italy) Simone Vagnozzi
- (Argentina) Mariano Zabaleta

The following players received entry from the qualifying draw:

- (Italy) Alberto Brizzi
- (Italy) Thomas Fabbiano
- (Chile) Guillermo Hormazabál
- (Italy) Gianluca Naso

The following player received special exempt into the main draw:

- (Slovakia) Pavol Červenák
- (Argentina) Nicolás Todero

== Champions ==
=== Singles ===
(Italy) Paolo Lorenzi def. (Monaco) Jean-René Lisnard, 7–5, 1–6, 6–2

=== Doubles ===
(Spain) Miguel Ángel López Jaén / (Spain) Pere Riba def. (Italy) Gianluca Naso / (Italy) Walter Trusendi, 6–4, 6–4
