= 2000 Davis Cup Europe/Africa Zone Group IV – Zone A =

International tennis competition

The Europe/Africa Zone was one of the three zones of the regional Davis Cup competition in 2000.

In the Europe/Africa Zone there were four different tiers, called groups, in which teams competed against each other to advance to the upper tier. The top two teams in each Group IV sub-zone advanced to the Europe/Africa Zone Group III in 2000. All other teams remained in Group IV.

== Participating nations ==
- Cyprus
- Djibouti
- Ethiopia
- Kenya
- Lesotho
- Namibia
- San Marino
- Uganda
- Zambia

=== Draw ===
- Venue: Lugogo Tennis Club, Kampala, Uganda
- Date: 19–23 January

Group A

	NAM	ZAM	SMR	ETH	RR; W–L	Match; W–L	Set; W–L	Standings
Namibia		2–1	2–1	3–0	3–0	7–2 (78%)	15–4 (79%)	1
Zambia	1–2		2–1	2–1	2–1	5–4 (56%)	10–9 (53%)	2
San Marino	1–2	1–2		2–1	1–2	4–5 (44%)	8–11 (42%)	3
Ethiopia	0–3	1–2	1–2		0–3	2–7 (22%)	5–14 (26%)	4

Group B

	KEN	CYP	UGA	LES	DJI	RR; W–L	Match; W–L	Set; W–L	Standings
Kenya		2–1	3–0	3–0	3–0	4–0	11–1 (92%)	21–4 (84%)	1
Cyprus	1–2		2–1	3–0	3–0	3–1	9–3 (75%)	19–6 (76%)	2
Uganda	0–3	1–2		2–1	3–0	2–2	6–6 (50%)	10–14 (42%)	3
Lesotho	0–3	0–3	1–2		3–0	1–3	4–8 (33%)	9–16 (36%)	4
Djibouti	0–3	0–3	0–3	0–3		0–4	0–12 (0%)	0–19 (0%)	5

- Namibia and Kenya promoted to Group III in 2001.

== Group A ==
=== Zambia vs. San Marino ===
Zambia
2
Lugogo Tennis Club, Kampala, Uganda
19 January 2000

San Marino
1

			1	2	3
1	(Zambia) (San Marino)	Sidney Bwalya; William Forcellini	6; 3	6; 0
2	(Zambia) (San Marino)	Lighton Ndefwai-Muchinda; Domenico Vicini	5; 7	3; 6
3	(Zambia) (San Marino)	Sidney Bwalya / Lighton Ndefwai-Muchinda; Gabriel Francini / Domenico Vicini	6; 1	6; 2

=== Zambia vs. Ethiopia ===
Zambia
2
Lugogo Tennis Club, Kampala, Uganda
20 January 2000

Ethiopia
1

			1	2	3
1	(Zambia) (Ethiopia)	Sidney Bwalya; Yohannes Setegnwandimu	6; 2	6; 1
2	(Zambia) (Ethiopia)	Lighton Ndefwai-Muchinda; Samuel Woldegebriel	5; 7	3; 6
3	(Zambia) (Ethiopia)	Sidney Bwalya / Lighton Ndefwai-Muchinda; Mikaile Asfaw / Yohannes Setegnwandimu	6; 3	6; 2

=== Namibia vs. San Marino ===
Namibia
2
Lugogo Tennis Club, Kampala, Uganda
21 January 2000

San Marino
1

			1	2	3
1	(Namibia) (San Marino)	Jean-Pierre Huish; William Forcellini	6; 3	6; 2
2	(Namibia) (San Marino)	Johan Theron; Domenico Vicini	1; 6	1; 6
3	(Namibia) (San Marino)	Henrico Du Plessis / Johan Theron; William Forcellini / Domenico Vicini	6; 3	6; 3

=== Namibia vs. Ethiopia ===
Namibia
3
Lugogo Tennis Club, Kampala, Uganda
22 January 2000

Ethiopia
0

			1	2	3
1	(Namibia) (Ethiopia)	Jean-Pierre Huish; Yohannes Setegnwandimu	6; 4	6; 1
2	(Namibia) (Ethiopia)	Johan Theron; Samuel Woldegebriel	6; 3	7; 5
3	(Namibia) (Ethiopia)	Henrico Du Plessis / Kevin Wentzel; Mikaile Asfaw / Samuel Woldegebriel	7; 5	6; 2

=== Namibia vs. Zambia ===
Namibia
2
Lugogo Tennis Club, Kampala, Uganda
23 January 2000

Zambia
1

			1	2	3
1	(Namibia) (Zambia)	Jean-Pierre Huish; Sidney Bwalya	2; 6	6; 3	4; 6
2	(Namibia) (Zambia)	Johan Theron; Lighton Ndefwai-Muchinda	6; 4	6; 3
3	(Namibia) (Zambia)	Henrico Du Plessis / Johan Theron; Sidney Bwalya / Lighton Ndefwai-Muchinda	6; 4	6; 4

=== San Marino vs. Ethiopia ===
San Marino
2
Lugogo Tennis Club, Kampala, Uganda
23 January 2000

Ethiopia
1

			1	2	3
1	(San Marino) (Ethiopia)	William Forcellini; Yohannes Setegnwandimu	3; 6	1; 6
2	(San Marino) (Ethiopia)	Domenico Vicini; Samuel Woldegebriel	6; 3	6; 3
3	(San Marino) (Ethiopia)	Andrea Della Balda / Domenico Vicini; Mikaile Asfaw / Samuel Woldegebriel	7; 5	3; 6	6; 3

== Group B ==
=== Cyprus vs. Lesotho ===
Cyprus
3
Lugogo Tennis Club, Kampala, Uganda
19 January 2000

Lesotho
0

			1	2	3
1	(Cyprus) (Lesotho)	George Kalanov; Khotso Khali	6; 3	6; 1
2	(Cyprus) (Lesotho)	Demetrios Leontis; Ntsane Moeletsi	6; 1	6; 0
3	(Cyprus) (Lesotho)	Marcos Baghdatis / Demetrios Leontis; Ntsukunyane Letseka / Relebohile Motsepa	6; 2	6; 0

=== Kenya vs. Uganda ===
Kenya
3
Lugogo Tennis Club, Kampala, Uganda
19 January 2000

Uganda
0

			1	2	3
1	(Kenya) (Uganda)	Allan Cooper; Robert Buyinza	6; 3	6; 1
2	(Kenya) (Uganda)	Trevor Kiruki; Bob Ndibwami	6; 4	3; 6	6; 1
3	(Kenya) (Uganda)	Barry Ndinya / Norbert Oduor; Robert Buyinza / Bob Ndibwami	7^{8} 6^{6}	7^{8} 6^{6}

=== Cyprus vs. Kenya ===
Cyprus
1
Lugogo Tennis Club, Kampala, Uganda
20 January 2000

Kenya
2

			1	2	3
1	(Cyprus) (Kenya)	George Kalanov; Allan Cooper	5; 7	6; 4	5; 7
2	(Cyprus) (Kenya)	Demetrios Leontis; Trevor Kiruki	6; 4	6; 4
3	(Cyprus) (Kenya)	Marcos Baghdatis / Demetrios Leontis; Allan Cooper / Trevor Kiruki	4; 6	3; 6

=== Lesotho vs. Djibouti ===
Lesotho
3
Lugogo Tennis Club, Kampala, Uganda
20 January 2000

Djibouti
0

			1	2	3
1	(Lesotho) (Djibouti)	Relebohile Motsepa; Alla Moussa	6; 1	6; 1
2	(Lesotho) (Djibouti)	Ntsane Moeletsi; Kadar Mogueh	6; 1	6; 1
3	(Lesotho) (Djibouti)	Khotso Khali / Ntsukunyane Letseka; Kadar Mogueh / Abdou-Rahman Aden	6; 4	6; 0

=== Uganda vs. Djibouti ===
Uganda
3
Lugogo Tennis Club, Kampala, Uganda
21 January 2000

Djibouti
0

			1	2	3
1	(Uganda) (Djibouti)	Robert Buyinza; Alla Moussa	6; 0			retired
2	(Uganda) (Djibouti)	Bob Ndibwami; Abdou-Rahman Aden	6; 1	6; 0
3	(Uganda) (Djibouti)	Robert Buyinza / Bob Ndibwami; Abdou-Rahman Aden / Alla Moussa				w/o

=== Kenya vs. Djibouti ===
Kenya
3
Lugogo Tennis Club, Kampala, Uganda
21 January 2000

Djibouti
0

			1	2	3
1	(Kenya) (Djibouti)	Barry Ndinya; Abdou-Rahman Aden	6; 1	6; 2
2	(Kenya) (Djibouti)	Allan Cooper; Kadar Mogueh	6; 0	1; 0		retired
3	(Kenya) (Djibouti)	Allan Cooper / Barry Ndinya; Abdullah Aden / Abdou-Rahman Aden	6; 0	6; 1

=== Kenya vs. Lesotho ===
Kenya
3
Lugogo Tennis Club, Kampala, Uganda
21 January 2000

Lesotho
0

			1	2	3
1	(Kenya) (Lesotho)	Barry Ndinya; Khotso Khali	6; 1	6; 4
2	(Kenya) (Lesotho)	Trevor Kiruki; Ntsane Moeletsi	6; 2	6; 0
3	(Kenya) (Lesotho)	Barry Ndinya / Norbert Oduor; Ntsukunyane Letseka / Relebohile Motsepa	6; 2	6; 4

=== Cyprus vs. Djibouti ===
Cyprus
3
Lugogo Tennis Club, Kampala, Uganda
22 January 2000

Djibouti
0

			1	2	3
1	(Cyprus) (Djibouti)	Constantinos Talianos; Abdou-Rahman Aden	6; 0			retired
2	(Cyprus) (Djibouti)	Marcos Baghdatis; Kadar Mogueh	6; 0	6; 0
3	(Cyprus) (Djibouti)	George Kalanov / Constantinos Talianos; Abdou-Rahman Aden / Kadar Mogueh	6; 1	6; 0

=== Lesotho vs. Uganda ===
Lesotho
1
Lugogo Tennis Club, Kampala, Uganda
22 January 2000

Uganda
2

			1	2	3
1	(Lesotho) (Uganda)	Relebohile Motsepa; Robert Buyinza	7; 5	6; 3
2	(Lesotho) (Uganda)	Ntsane Moeletsi; Bob Ndibwami	4; 6	6; 3	4; 6
3	(Lesotho) (Uganda)	Ntsukunyane Letseka / Relebohile Motsepa; Robert Buyinza / Bob Ndibwami	1; 6	3; 6

=== Cyprus vs. Uganda ===
Cyprus
2
Lugogo Tennis Club, Kampala, Uganda
23 January 2000

Uganda
1

			1	2	3
1	(Cyprus) (Uganda)	Marcos Baghdatis; Robert Buyinza	6; 3	6; 4
2	(Cyprus) (Uganda)	George Kalanov; Bob Ndibwami	6; 2	6; 4
3	(Cyprus) (Uganda)	Marcos Baghdatis / Constantinos Talianos; Robert Buyinza / Bob Ndibwami	6^{5} 7^{7}	6; 2	3; 6
