= 2011 US Open – Men's singles qualifying =

Men's singles qualifying
- 2011 US Open

Events
Singles	men	women		boys	girls
Doubles	men	women	mixed	boys	girls
WC Singles	men	women	quad
WC Doubles	men	women	quad
Legends	men	women	mixed
- US Open

The men's qualifying singles event began on 23 August in New York and was completed over four days through to and including the 26 August.

== Seeds ==
1. (Brazil) João Souza (qualified)
2. (Chile) Paul Capdeville (qualifying competition)
3. (Turkey) Marsel İlhan (qualified)
4. (Netherlands) Thomas Schoorel (first round)
5. (Brazil) Rogério Dutra da Silva (qualifying competition, lucky loser)
6. (Germany) Mischa Zverev (first round)
7. (France) Benoît Paire (first round)
8. (Slovenia) Grega Žemlja (qualifying competition)
9. (Japan) Go Soeda (qualified)
10. (South Africa) Rik de Voest (first round)
11. (South Africa) Izak van der Merwe (first round)
12. (Lithuania) Ričardas Berankis (second round)
13. (France) Kenny de Schepper (first round)
14. (Australia) Matthew Ebden (Second rround)
15. (Germany) Andreas Beck (second round)
16. (United Kingdom) James Ward (first round)
17. (Italy) Paolo Lorenzi (second round)
18. (Poland) Jerzy Janowicz (first round)
19. (United States) Wayne Odesnik (first round)
20. (Canada) Vasek Pospisil (qualified)
21. (Belgium) Ruben Bemelmans (second round)
22. (Australia) Marinko Matosevic (Received wildcard to main draw)
23. (France) Augustin Gensse (qualified)
24. (Russia) Evgeny Donskoy (second round)
25. (Germany) Cedrik-Marcel Stebe (first round)
26. (France) Arnaud Clément (first round)
27. (Serbia) Nikola Ćirić (first round)
28. (Slovakia) Lukáš Lacko (qualifying competition, lucky loser)
29. (Spain) Arnau Brugués-Davi (first round)
30. (Argentina) Brian Dabul (first round)
31. (Netherlands) Jesse Huta Galung (qualified)
32. (Brazil) Júlio Silva (first round)

== Qualifiers ==
1. (Brazil) João Souza
2. (Monaco) Jean-René Lisnard
3. (Turkey) Marsel İlhan
4. (Netherlands) Jesse Huta Galung
5. (Ukraine) Sergei Bubka
6. (France) Augustin Gensse
7. (Republic of Ireland) Louk Sorensen
8. (Canada) Vasek Pospisil
9. (Japan) Go Soeda
10. (Tunisia) Malek Jaziri
11. (Republic of Ireland) Conor Niland
12. (Colombia) Robert Farah
13. (France) Romain Jouan
14. (Canada) Frank Dancevic
15. (France) Jonathan Dasnières de Veigy
16. (United States) Michael Yani

== Lucky losers ==
1. (Slovakia) Lukáš Lacko
2. (Brazil) Rogério Dutra da Silva

== Qualifying draw ==
Key

- Q = Qualifier
- WC = Wild card
- LL = Lucky loser
- Alt = Alternate
- ITF = ITF entry
- PR = Protected ranking
- SR = Special ranking
- SE = Special exempt
- JE = Junior exempt
- JR = Junior Accelerator Programme entrant
- CO = College Accelerator Programme entrant
- NG = Next Gen Accelerator Program entrant
- w/o = Walkover
- r = Retired
- d = Defaulted

=== First qualifier ===
First round
1	(Brazil) João Souza	4	6	6
(Czech Republic) Jan Mertl	6	4	2
(Italy) Gianluca Naso	6	6
(Italy) Thomas Fabbiano	2	3
(Belgium) David Goffin	6	6
(Moldova) Roman Borvanov	0	3
(Netherlands) Igor Sijsling	6	6
25	(Germany) Cedrik-Marcel Stebe	2	3

Second round
1	(Brazil) João Souza	6	7
(Italy) Gianluca Naso	0	5
(Belgium) David Goffin	3	6	6
(Netherlands) Igor Sijsling	6	1	3

Qualifying Round
1	(Brazil) João Souza	7	7
(Belgium) David Goffin	5	5

=== Second qualifier ===
First round
2	(Chile) Paul Capdeville	6	6^{7}	6
(Israel) Amir Weintraub	4	7^{9}	1
(Colombia) Juan Sebastián Cabal	4	2
(United States) Greg Ouellette	6	6
PR	(Monaco) Jean-René Lisnard	6	6^{2}	6
(Slovakia) Ivo Klec	3	7^{7}	4
(Dominican Republic) Víctor Estrella	4	1
17	(Italy) Paolo Lorenzi	6	6

Second round
2	(Chile) Paul Capdeville	6	3	6
(United States) Greg Ouellette	4	6	1
PR	(Monaco) Jean-René Lisnard	6	4	6
17	(Italy) Paolo Lorenzi	0	6	1

Qualifying Round
2	(Chile) Paul Capdeville	7^{10}	2	4
PR	(Monaco) Jean-René Lisnard	6^{8}	6	6

=== Third qualifier ===
First round
3	(Turkey) Marsel İlhan	6	6
(Poland) Marcin Gawron	2	0
(France) Vincent Millot	4	6	6
PR	(United States) Zack Fleishman	6	4	2
(Argentina) Facundo Bagnis	4	6	5
(Romania) Marius Copil	6	3	7
(Argentina) Eduardo Schwank	1	1
28	(Slovakia) Lukáš Lacko	6	6

Second round
3	(Turkey) Marsel İlhan	6	7
(France) Vincent Millot	2	5
(Romania) Marius Copil	6^{4}	3
28	(Slovakia) Lukáš Lacko	7^{7}	6

Qualifying Round
3	(Turkey) Marsel İlhan	6	6
28	(Slovakia) Lukáš Lacko	3	2

=== Fourth qualifier ===
First round
4	(Netherlands) Thomas Schoorel	4	2
(Italy) Stefano Galvani	6	6
(Thailand) Danai Udomchoke	3	4
(Croatia) Antonio Veić	6	6
(Chile) Guillermo Rivera-Aránguiz	1	4
(France) Grégoire Burquier	6	6
(France) Maxime Teixeira	4	6	4
31	(Netherlands) Jesse Huta Galung	6	4	6

Second round
(Italy) Stefano Galvani	4	6	2
(Croatia) Antonio Veić	6	4	6
(France) Grégoire Burquier	6^{4}	6^{6}
31	(Netherlands) Jesse Huta Galung	7^{7}	7^{8}

Qualifying Round
(Croatia) Antonio Veić	0	1
31	(Netherlands) Jesse Huta Galung	6	6

=== Fifth qualifier ===
First round
5	(Brazil) Rogério Dutra da Silva	6	7^{8}
(France) Clément Reix	4	6^{6}
(Spain) Adrián Menéndez	4	7^{9}	6
(Germany) Alexander Waske	6	6^{7}	4
(Estonia) Jürgen Zopp	3	6^{5}
(Ukraine) Sergei Bubka	6	7^{7}
(United States) Nicholas Monroe	1	6	1
21	(Belgium) Ruben Bemelmans	6	4	6

Second round
5	(Brazil) Rogério Dutra da Silva	6	6
(Spain) Adrián Menéndez	3	3
(Ukraine) Sergei Bubka	6	6
21	(Belgium) Ruben Bemelmans	3	2

Qualifying Round
5	(Brazil) Rogério Dutra da Silva	2	6	3
(Ukraine) Sergei Bubka	6	4	6

=== Sixth qualifier ===
First round
6	(Germany) Mischa Zverev	4	2
(Germany) Bastian Knittel	6	6
(Hungary) Ádám Kellner	2	2
(Lithuania) Laurynas Grigelis	6	6
(France) Ludovic Walter	6^{4}	4
(Portugal) João Sousa	7^{7}	6
(Germany) Jan-Lennard Struff	2	3
23	(France) Augustin Gensse	6	6

Second round
(Germany) Bastian Knittel	1	6^{3}
(Lithuania) Laurynas Grigelis	6	7^{7}
(Portugal) João Sousa	1	6	4
23	(France) Augustin Gensse	6	1	6

Qualifying Round
(Lithuania) Laurynas Grigelis	6^{5}	5
23	(France) Augustin Gensse	7^{7}	7

=== Seventh qualifier ===
First round
7	(France) Benoît Paire	6^{6}	6^{6}
(Austria) Martin Fischer	7^{8}	7^{8}
(France) David Guez	6	6
(Croatia) Nikola Mektić	0	4
(United States) Alex Kuznetsov	6	5	3
(Portugal) Gastão Elias	3	7	6
PR	(Republic of Ireland) Louk Sorensen	7^{7}	6
29	(Spain) Arnau Brugués-Davi	6^{2}	4

Second round
(Austria) Martin Fischer	6	6
(France) David Guez	4	0
(Portugal) Gastão Elias	4	1
PR	(Republic of Ireland) Louk Sorensen	6	6

Qualifying Round
(Austria) Martin Fischer	6^{2}	1
PR	(Republic of Ireland) Louk Sorensen	7^{7}	6

=== Eighth qualifier ===
First round
8	(Slovenia) Grega Žemlja	6	6
(Australia) Peter Luczak	1	4
(Switzerland) Marco Chiudinelli	6^{8}	6	6
(Denmark) Frederik Nielsen	7^{10}	3	3
(France) Charles-Antoine Brézac	6	7
WC	(United States) Daniel Kosakowski	2	5
(Australia) Chris Guccione	6^{4}	5
20	(Canada) Vasek Pospisil	7^{7}	7

Second round
8	(Slovenia) Grega Žemlja	6	6
(Switzerland) Marco Chiudinelli	4	4
(France) Charles-Antoine Brézac	1	5
20	(Canada) Vasek Pospisil	6	7

Qualifying Round
8	(Slovenia) Grega Žemlja	4	6	6^{5}
20	(Canada) Vasek Pospisil	6	2	7^{7}

=== Ninth qualifier ===
First round
9	(Japan) Go Soeda	6	6
(United States) Tim Smyczek	1	3
(Germany) Sebastian Rieschick	6	6
(Spain) Roberto Bautista-Agut	3	2
(Czech Republic) Dušan Lojda	6	7
(Japan) Yuichi Sugita	3	5
(Australia) Greg Jones	6^{6}	6	6
19	(United States) Wayne Odesnik	7^{8}	2	2

Second round
9	(Japan) Go Soeda	4	6	6
(Germany) Sebastian Rieschick	6	2	2
(Czech Republic) Dušan Lojda	2	6^{4}
(Australia) Greg Jones	6	7^{7}

Qualifying Round
9	(Japan) Go Soeda	6	6
(Australia) Greg Jones	3	3

=== Tenth qualifier ===
First round
10	(South Africa) Rik de Voest	4	4
WC	(United States) Rhyne Williams	6	6
(Belgium) Yannick Mertens	3	2
(France) Guillaume Rufin	6	6
(Brazil) Fernando Romboli	1	1
(Tunisia) Malek Jaziri	6	6
(Sweden) Michael Ryderstedt	7	6
30	(Argentina) Brian Dabul	6^{1}	4

Second round
WC	(United States) Rhyne Williams	2	5
(France) Guillaume Rufin	6	7
(Tunisia) Malek Jaziri	2	6	6
(Sweden) Michael Ryderstedt	6	4	2

Qualifying Round
(France) Guillaume Rufin	5	1^{r}
(Tunisia) Malek Jaziri	7	2

=== Eleventh qualifier ===
First round
11	(South Africa) Izak van der Merwe	2	1
(Chinese Taipei) Yang Tsung-hua	6	6
(Republic of Ireland) Conor Niland	6	6
(Slovakia) Pavol Červenák	1	4
(Italy) Matteo Viola	6	6
(Italy) Alessandro Giannessi	3	1
(Netherlands) Matwé Middelkoop	6	6^{5}	6
18	(Poland) Jerzy Janowicz	3	7^{7}	1

Second round
(Chinese Taipei) Yang Tsung-hua	2	3
(Republic of Ireland) Conor Niland	6	6
(Italy) Matteo Viola	4	6^{5}
(Netherlands) Matwé Middelkoop	6	7^{7}

Qualifying Round
(Republic of Ireland) Conor Niland	2	6	6
(Netherlands) Matwé Middelkoop	6	1	4

=== Twelfth qualifier ===
First round
12	(Lithuania) Ričardas Berankis	6	6
(Spain) Guillermo Alcaide	2	2
(Czech Republic) Jan Hernych	2	3
(Germany) Dominik Meffert	6	6
(New Zealand) Michael Venus	6	2	2
(Germany) Andre Begemann	1	6	6
(Colombia) Robert Farah	7^{7}	1	6
32	(Brazil) Júlio Silva	6^{5}	6	3

Second round
12	(Lithuania) Ričardas Berankis	4	5
(Germany) Dominik Meffert	6	7
(Germany) Andre Begemann	2	0
(Colombia) Robert Farah	6	6

Qualifying Round
(Germany) Dominik Meffert	3	7^{7}	3
(Colombia) Robert Farah	6	6^{1}	6

=== Thirteenth qualifier ===
First round
13	(France) Kenny de Schepper	6	6^{5}	5
WC	(United States) Mitchell Frank	3	7^{7}	7
(Russia) Denis Matsukevich	2	4
(France) Romain Jouan	6	6
(Italy) Andrea Arnaboldi	3	6	6^{7}
WC	(United States) Denis Kudla	6	4	7^{9}
(Bosnia and Herzegovina) Amer Delić	7^{7}	4	2
24	(Russia) Evgeny Donskoy	6^{3}	6	6

Second round
WC	(United States) Mitchell Frank	3	6	3
(France) Romain Jouan	6	4	6
WC	(United States) Denis Kudla	1	6	7^{7}
24	(Russia) Evgeny Donskoy	6	3	6^{5}

Qualifying Round
(France) Romain Jouan	6	6
WC	(United States) Denis Kudla	4	2

=== Fourteenth qualifier ===
First round
14	(Australia) Matthew Ebden	6	6
(Australia) James Lemke	0	3
WC	(United States) Bradley Klahn	6^{2}	6	6
WC	(United States) Tennys Sandgren	7^{7}	2	2
WC	(United States) Bjorn Fratangelo	2	2
(South Africa) Fritz Wolmarans	6	6
(Canada) Frank Dancevic	6	6
26	(France) Arnaud Clément	3	3

Second round
14	(Australia) Matthew Ebden	4	7^{7}	3
WC	(United States) Bradley Klahn	6	6^{5}	6
(South Africa) Fritz Wolmarans	4	7^{7}	3
(Canada) Frank Dancevic	6	6^{5}	6

Qualifying Round
WC	(United States) Bradley Klahn	6	1	3
(Canada) Frank Dancevic	3	6	6

=== Fifteenth qualifier ===
First round
15	(Germany) Andreas Beck	7^{7}	6
(Colombia) Carlos Salamanca	6^{3}	1
(Serbia) Ilija Bozoljac	6	6
(United States) Jesse Witten	3	2
(France) Jonathan Dasnières de Veigy	6	6
WC	(United States) Marcos Giron	3	2
WC	(United States) Blake Strode	6	7^{7}
27	(Serbia) Nikola Ćirić	3	6^{4}

Second round
15	(Germany) Andreas Beck	6^{1}	3
(Serbia) Ilija Bozoljac	7^{7}	6
(France) Jonathan Dasnières de Veigy	6	6^{2}	6
WC	(United States) Blake Strode	4	7^{7}	1

Qualifying Round
(Serbia) Ilija Bozoljac	6	4	1
(France) Jonathan Dasnières de Veigy	4	6	6

=== Sixteenth qualifier ===
First round
16	(United Kingdom) James Ward	6^{2}	4
(United States) Michael Yani	7^{7}	6
(Argentina) Pablo Galdón	6	6
(Switzerland) Stéphane Bohli	4	4
(France) Axel Michon	5	3
(United States) Rajeev Ram	7	6
(Brazil) Ricardo Hocevar	4	1
Alt	(Australia) Carsten Ball	6	6

Second round
(United States) Michael Yani	6	6
(Argentina) Pablo Galdón	4	4
(United States) Rajeev Ram	4	7^{7}	6
Alt	(Australia) Carsten Ball	6	6^{2}	1

Qualifying Round
(United States) Michael Yani	3	6	7^{7}
(United States) Rajeev Ram	6	3	6^{5}
