= 2010 Camparini Gioielli Cup – Doubles =

Doubles
- 2010 Camparini Gioielli Cup

Final
- Champion: (Austria) Philipp Oswald (Austria) Martin Slanar
- Runner-up: (Australia) Sadik Kadir (India) Purav Raja
- Score: 6–2, 5–7, [10–6]

Events
Singles	Doubles
← 2009 ·	Camparini Gioielli Cup	· 2011 →

Miguel Ángel López Jaén and Pere Riba were the defending champions, but López Jaén chose not to compete this year and Riba chose to compete at Wimbledon instead.
Philipp Oswald and Martin Slanar won the final 6–2, 5–7, [10–6] against Sadik Kadir and Purav Raja.

== Seeds ==
1. (Austria) Philipp Oswald / (Austria) Martin Slanar (champions)
2. (Australia) Sadik Kadir / (India) Purav Raja (final)
3. (France) Olivier Charroin / (France) Vincent Stouff (semifinals)
4. (United States) Alex Bogomolov Jr. / (Brazil) Ricardo Hocevar (semifinals)

== Main draw ==
=== Key ===
- Q = Qualifier
- WC = Wild card
- LL = Lucky loser
- Alt = Alternate
- SE = Special exempt
- PR = Protected ranking
- ITF = ITF entry
- JE = Junior exempt
- w/o = Walkover
- r = Retired
- d = Defaulted
- SR = Special ranking

=== Draw ===
First round
WC	(Spain) P Andújar (Germany) C Mohs	3	4
(Italy) F Cipolla (Morocco) R El Amrani	6	6
3	(France) O Charroin (France) V Stouff	2	7	[10]
(Italy) D Giorgini (Italy) A Motti	6	6^{2}	[5]
(Argentina) C Berlocq (Argentina) F del Bonis	6	5	[10]
(Chile) P Capdeville (Portugal) J Sousa	4	7	[5]
(Brazil) T Alves (Brazil) J Silva	2	2
(Italy) A di Mauro (Italy) T Fabbiano	6	6
(Italy) E Fioravante (Italy) N Remedi	3	4
4	(United States) A Bogomolov Jr. (Brazil) R Hocevar	6	6
(Belarus) U Ignatik (Canada) P Polansky	7	7
(Italy) G Naso (Italy) W Trusendi	6^{1}	6^{4}
(Italy) F Gaio (Italy) A Giannessi	7	2	[8]
2	(Australia) S Kadir (India) P Raja	6^{4}	6	[10]

Quarterfinals
1	(Austria) P Oswald (Austria) M Slanar	6	7
(Italy) F Cipolla (Morocco) R El Amrani	2	6^{4}
3	(France) O Charroin (France) V Stouff	6	6
(Argentina) C Berlocq (Argentina) F del Bonis	1	2
(Italy) A di Mauro (Italy) T Fabbiano	1	2
4	(United States) A Bogomolov Jr. (Brazil) R Hocevar	6	6
(Belarus) U Ignatik (Canada) P Polansky	3	4
2	(Australia) S Kadir (India) P Raja	6	6

Semifinals
1	(Austria) P Oswald (Austria) M Slanar	6	6
3	(France) O Charroin (France) V Stouff	2	2
4	(United States) A Bogomolov Jr. (Brazil) R Hocevar	2	4
2	(Australia) S Kadir (India) P Raja	6	6

Final
1	(Austria) P Oswald (Austria) M Slanar	6	5	[10]
2	(Australia) S Kadir (India) P Raja	2	7	[6]
