= Vittorio Pellandra =

Sammarinese tennis player

- Country (sports): San Marino
- Born: 27 January 1941 (age 84)

Vittorio Pellandra (27 January 1941) is a tennis player from San Marino. He is notable for being the oldest Davis Cup player at 66 years and 104 days old.

In 2007, on the occasion of the round-robin match against Egypt in the Davis Cup, the San Marino team was forced to call up only two players due to the lack of alternatives, with the 66-year-old captain then, Vittorio Pellandra, adding his name to the list of players to reach the minimum allowed of three players. With one of his players unable to take part in the doubles, it was Pellandra who took the field. He thereby set the new record as the oldest Davis Cup player despite a leg problem that forced him to retire after just 10 minutes of play.
