= Tennis at the 2005 Games of the Small States of Europe =

Champions

Men's singles
- Benjamin Balleret (MON)

Women's singles
- Mandy Minella (LUX)

Men's doubles
- Laurent Bram / Gilles Kremer (LUX)

Women's doubles
- Mandy Minella / Lynn Philippe (LUX)
| ← 2003 · | Games of the Small States of Europe | · 2007 → |

Tennis competitions at the 2005 Games of the Small States of Europe in Andorra at the L'Aldosa Sport Complex in La Massana. The tournament took place on indoor hard courts.

== Tennis at the 2005 Games of the Small States of Europe ==
| Event | Gold | Silver | Bronze |
|---|---|---|---|
| Men's singles | Benjamin Balleret (MON) | Boris Pašanski (MLT) | Guillaume Couillard (MON) |
| Men's singles | Benjamin Balleret (MON) | Boris Pašanski (MLT) | Arnar Sigurdsson (ISL) |
| Men's doubles | Luxembourg; Laurent Bram; Gilles Kremer | Monaco; Benjamin Balleret; Guillaume Couillard | Iceland; Raj-Kumar Bonifacius; Arnar Sigurdsson |
| Men's doubles | Luxembourg; Laurent Bram; Gilles Kremer | Monaco; Benjamin Balleret; Guillaume Couillard | Liechtenstein; Gian-Carlo Besimo; Jiri Lokaj |
| Women's singles | Mandy Minella (LUX) | Stephanie Vogt (LIE) | Lisa Camenzuli (MLT) |
| Women's singles | Mandy Minella (LUX) | Stephanie Vogt (LIE) | Lynn Philippe (LUX) |
| Women's doubles | Luxembourg; Mandy Minella; Lynn Philippe | Liechtenstein; Johanna Hemmerle; Stephanie Vogt | Malta; Lisa Camenzuli; Stephanie Pace |
| Women's doubles | Luxembourg; Mandy Minella; Lynn Philippe | Liechtenstein; Johanna Hemmerle; Stephanie Vogt | Iceland; Rakel Petursdóttir; Sigurlaug Sigurðardóttir |
