= Domenico Vicini =

Sammarinese tennis player

- Country (sports): San Marino
- Born: 1 September 1971 (age 54) Finale Ligure
- Retired: 2022 (inactive)
- Plays: Right-handed

Singles
- Career record: 0–0
- Current ranking: 208 in M40

Doubles
- Career record: 0–0
- Highest ranking: No. 652

Domenico Vicini
Medal record

Tennis

Representing San Marino

Games of the Small States of Europe
| Silver medal – second place | 1997 Iceland | Doubles |
| Silver medal – second place | 2007 Monaco | Doubles |
| Silver medal – second place | 2009 Cyprus | Doubles |
| Silver medal – second place | 2011 Liechtenstein | Doubles |
| Bronze medal – third place | 1999 Liechtenstein | Doubles |
| Bronze medal – third place | 2001 San Marino | Singles |
| Bronze medal – third place | 2003 Malta | Double |

Domenico Vicini (1 September 1971) is a tennis player from San Marino.

Best known for his appearances record in Davis Cup with his national team (100 ties played), he was rewarded in 2012 with the Commitment Award by ITF.

He represents San Marino also in Games of the Small States of Europe, where he won 4 silver and 3 bronze medals, six of them in doubles, with Christian Rosti (1997, 2003), Gabriel Francini (1999) and Stefano Galvani (2007, 2009, 2011).

Currently, he plays on seniors circuit. He was the first San Marino male player to enter in ATP ranking, reaching the 652nd position in doubles ranking in 2008.
