= 2010 Camparini Gioielli Cup =

- Date: June 21 – June 27
- Edition: 10th
- Location: Reggio Emilia, Italy

Champions

Singles
- (Argentina) Carlos Berlocq

Doubles
- (Austria) Philipp Oswald / (Austria) Martin Slanar
← 2009 ·	Camparini Gioielli Cup	· 2011 →

The 2010 Camparini Gioielli Cup was a professional tennis tournament played on outdoor red clay courts. It was part of the 2010 ATP Challenger Tour. It took place in Reggio Emilia, Italy between 21 and 27 June 2010.

== ATP entrants ==
=== Seeds ===
Nationality	Player	Ranking*	Seeding
ITA	Filippo Volandri	102	1
BRA	Thiago Alves	106	2
AUT	Daniel Köllerer	111	3
ITA	Simone Bolelli	132	4
ESP	Pablo Andújar	139	5
USA	Kevin Kim	142	6
ARG	Federico del Bonis	145	7
FRA	Josselin Ouanna	146	8

- Rankings are as of June 14, 2010.

=== Other entrants ===
The following players received wildcards into the singles main draw:

- (Italy) Flavio Cipolla
- (Italy) Thomas Fabbiano
- (Italy) Federico Gaio
- (Italy) Daniele Giorgini

The following players received entry from the qualifying draw:

- (Italy) Alberto Brizzi
- (Brazil) Ricardo Hocevar
- (Austria) Martin Slanar
- (Italy) Walter Trusendi

== Champions ==
=== Singles ===
(Argentina) Carlos Berlocq def. (Spain) Pablo Andújar, 6–0, 7–6(1).

=== Doubles ===
(Austria) Philipp Oswald / (Austria) Martin Slanar def. (Australia) Sadik Kadir / (India) Purav Raja, 6–2, 5–7, [10–6].
