= Stefano Galvani =

Italian tennis player (born 1977)

- Country (sports): Italy; San Marino
- Residence: Padua, Italy
- Born: 3 June 1977 (age 49) Padua, Italy
- Height: 1.78 m (5 ft 10 in)
- Turned pro: 1999
- Retired: 2012 (comeback in 2021–22)
- Plays: Right-handed
- Prize money: $694,063

Singles
- Career record: 18–37
- Career titles: 0
- Highest ranking: No. 99 (2 April 2007)

Grand Slam singles results
- Australian Open: 1R (2002)
- French Open: 2R (2006)
- Wimbledon: 2R (2003, 2006, 2008)
- US Open: Q3 (2003, 2005)

Doubles
- Career record: 1–6
- Career titles: 0
- Highest ranking: No. 148 (10 June 2002)
- Current ranking: No. 623 (24 May 2010)

Grand Slam doubles results
- Australian Open: 1R (2002)
Medal record
Representing San Marino
Games of the Small States of Europe
Gold medal – first place	2011 Liechtenstein	Singles
Silver medal – second place	2007 Monaco	Doubles
Silver medal – second place	2009 Cyprus	Doubles
Silver medal – second place	2011 Liechtenstein	Doubles
Bronze medal – third place	2007 Monaco	Singles
Bronze medal – third place	2009 Cyprus	Singles
Bronze medal – third place	2013 Luxembourg	Doubles

Stefano Galvani (Italian pronunciation: [ˈsteːfano ɡalˈvaːni]; born 3 June 1977) is a professional male tennis player from San Marino. He is a professional from 1999 and was coached by Patricio Remondegui.

== Professional career ==
He reached a career high of No. 99 ATP Ranking on April 2, 2007 and April 30 of the same year. During his career, he earned total prize money of $791,336.

He had three appearances in the Davis Cup, two wins and one defeat, in the ties against Portugal and Finland in 2002.

=== 2002 ===
Galvani defeated former #4 (and former #1 Yevgeny Kafelnikov) on his way to the Round of 16 in Barcelona.

Later that year, Galvani made his only appearance in an ATP Quarter-Final in Sopot, beating #64 Olivier Rochus and #98 Marc Rosset before losing to #16 (and former #1) Carlos Moya in three sets.

=== 2007 ===
On April 2, 2007, Galvani achieved his career-high singles ranking: World No. 99.

=== 2008 ===
In June, Galvani qualified in singles for the 2008 Wimbledon, beating #222 Yeu-Tzuoo Wang, #148 Andrey Golubev, and #197 Ilija Bozoljac. He was defeated in the second round by world No. 17 Mikhail Youzhny in five sets.

== ATP Tour finals ==
Legend
ATP Challenger Tour (5–8)

Outcome	No.	Date	Tournament	Surface	Opponent	Score
Runner-up	1.	4 September 2000	Sofia, Bulgaria	Clay	(Italy) Stefano Tarallo	1–6, 2–6
Runner-up	2.	12 December 2001	Mumbai, India	Hard	(Italy) Federico Luzzi	7–6^{(7–2)}, 5–7, 6–7^{(4–7)}
Winner	1.	3 September 2001	Brașov, Romania	Clay	(Spain) Iván Navarro	6–4, 6–1
Runner-up	3.	10 September 2001	Sofia, Bulgaria	Clay	(Greece) Vasilis Mazarakis	6–7^{(5–7)}, 4–6
Winner	2.	17 September 2001	Seville, Spain	Clay	(Australia) Todd Larkham	6–2, 6–4
Winner	3.	14 October 2002	Cairo, Egypt	Clay	(Spain) Albert Portas	2–6, 7–6^{(7–4)}, 6–1
Runner-up	4.	30 June 2003	Mantova, Italy	Clay	(Italy) Vincenzo Santopadre	3–6, 4–6
Runner-up	5.	20 March 2006	Barletta, Italy	Clay	(Czech Republic) Jan Hájek	2–6, 1–6
Runner-up	6.	15 May 2006	San Remo, Italy	Clay	(France) Olivier Patience	2–6, 6–4, 6–7^{(8–10)}
Winner	4.	19 March 2007	Rabat, Morocco	Clay	(France) Olivier Patience	6–1, 6–1
Winner	5.	10 September 2007	Todi, Italy	Clay	(Romania) Adrian Ungur	7–5, 6–2
Runner-up	7.	23 February 2009	Wolfsburg, Germany	Carpet (i)	(Belgium) Ruben Bemelmans	6–7^{(5–7)}, 6–3, 3–6
Runner-up	8.	4 July 2011	San Benedetto, Italy	Clay	(Romania) Adrian Ungur	5–7, 2–6

== Grand Slam performance timeline ==
Key
W	F	SF	QF	#R	RR	Q#	DNQ	A	NH

(W) winner; (F) finalist; (SF) semifinalist; (QF) quarterfinalist; (#R) rounds 4, 3, 2, 1; (RR) round-robin stage; (Q#) qualification round; (DNQ) did not qualify; (A) absent; (NH) not held; (SR) strike rate (events won / competed); (W–L) win–loss record.
To avoid confusion and double counting, these charts are updated at the conclusion of a tournament or when the player's participation has ended.

Tournament	2001	2002	2003	2004	2005	2006	2007	2008	2009	2010	2011	2012	SR	W–L
Australian Open	A	1R	A	A	A	A	A	Q2	A	A	A	A	0 / 1	0–1
French Open	1R	1R	A	A	A	2R	1R	Q1	A	1R	A	Q2	0 / 5	1–5
Wimbledon	A	1R	2R	A	A	2R	Q3	2R	Q1	A	A	Q1	0 / 4	3–4
US Open	Q1	Q2	Q3	A	Q3	Q2	A	Q1	A	A	Q2	A	0 / 0	0–0
Win–loss	0–1	0–3	1–1	0–0	0–0	2–2	0–1	1–1	0–0	0–1	0–1	0–0	0 / 11	4–11
Year End Ranking	140	126	181	579	199	110	171	217	252	274	175	641		
