= Jean-René Lisnard =

Monegasque tennis player (born 1979)

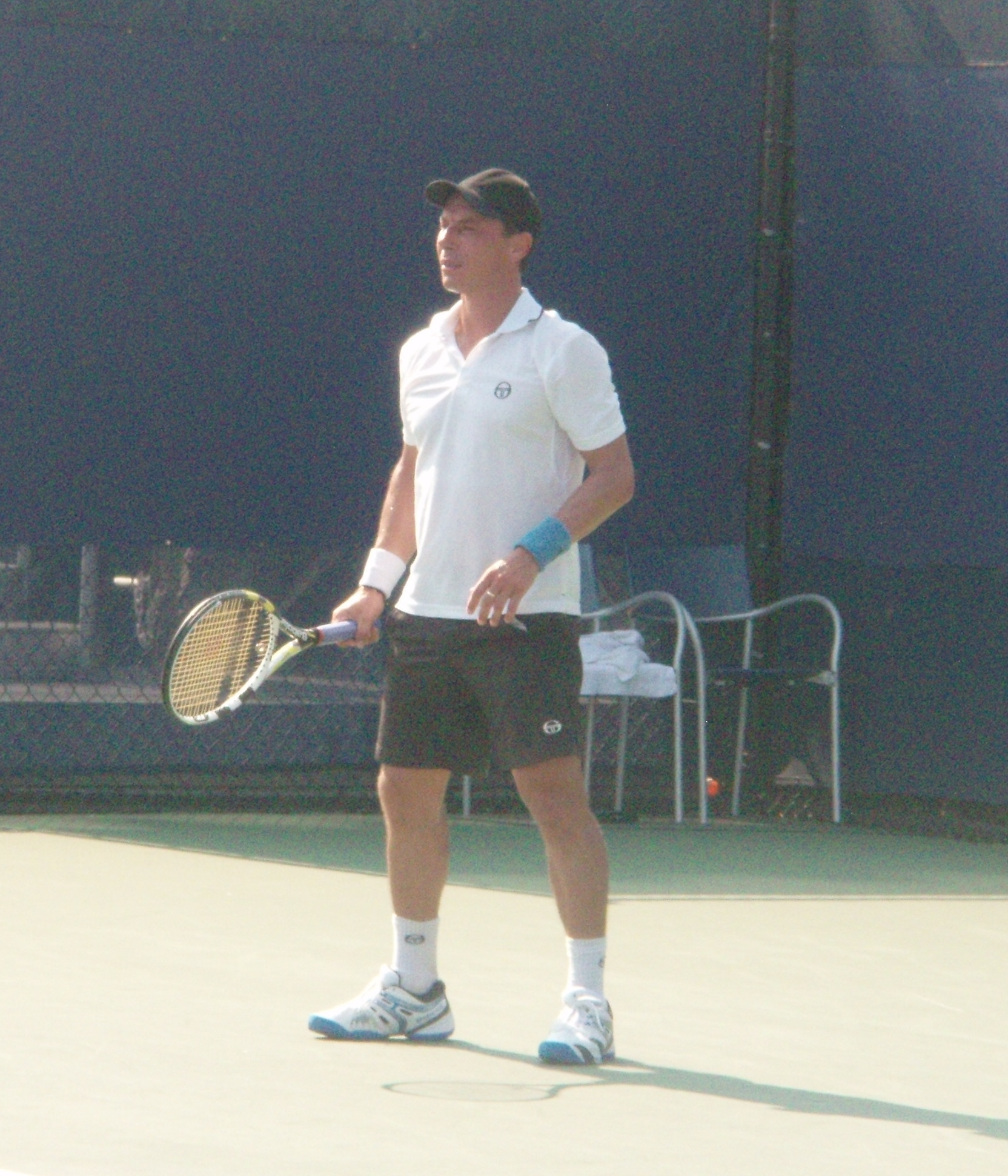
- Country (sports): France (before 2006); Monaco (2006–)
- Born: 25 September 1979 (age 46) Cannes, France
- Height: 1.73 m (5 ft 8 in)
- Turned pro: 1997
- Retired: 2013
- Plays: Right-handed (one-handed backhand)
- Prize money: $1,142,109

Singles
- Career record: 52–87
- Career titles: 0
- Highest ranking: No. 84 (27 January 2003)

Grand Slam singles results
- Australian Open: 3R (2005)
- French Open: 2R (2001, 2003)
- Wimbledon: 2R (2005)
- US Open: 2R (2002, 2003, 2011)

Doubles
- Career record: 6–18
- Career titles: 0
- Highest ranking: No. 171 (10 September 2007)

Grand Slam doubles results
- French Open: 2R (1999, 2000)
Medal record
Representing Monaco
Games of the Small States of Europe
Gold medal – first place	2007 Monaco	Singles
Gold medal – first place	2007 Monaco	Doubles
Gold medal – first place	2009 Cyprus	Singles
Gold medal – first place	2009 Cyprus	Doubles
- Last updated on: 28 September 2021.

Jean-René Lisnard (French pronunciation: [ʒɑ̃.ʁəne linaʁ]; born 25 September 1979) is a French-Monegasque retired professional tennis player who formerly represented France. He was a member of the Monaco Davis Cup team from 2007. He is the first Monegasque tennis player to have won a match in the main draw of a Grand Slam tournament.

== Tennis career ==
Lisnard plays right-handed, and turned professional in 1997.

He reached his career-high singles ranking of World No. 84 in January 2003. His current doubles ranking is 400 with his highest rank being 171 on 10 September 2007.

In May at the 2009 French Open, he lost his first-round match to Israeli player Dudi Sela 6–4, 6–3, 4–6, 6–3.

Lisnard qualified for the main draw of the 2011 US Open and defeated Olivier Rochus of Belgium in straight sets to advance to the second round. He lost to Germany's Florian Mayer in straight sets in the second round.

== Junior Grand Slam finals ==
=== Doubles: 1 (1 runner-up) ===
Result	Date	Tournament	Surface	Partnet	Opponents	Score
Loss	Sep 1997 (details)	US Open	Hard	(France) Michaël Llodra	(Chile) Fernando González (Chile) Nicolás Massú	4–6, 4–6

== ATP Challenger and ITF Futures finals ==
=== Singles: 18 (7–11) ===
Legend ATP Challenger (2–7) ITF Futures (5–4)	Finals by surface Hard (0–2) Clay (7–9) Grass (0–0) Carpet (0–0)

Result	W–L	Date	Tournament	Tier	Surface	Opponent	Score
Loss	0–1	Apr 1999	Great Britain F4, Hatfield	Futures	Clay	(Sweden) Patrik Fredriksson	6–7, 6–2, 6–7
Win	1–1	May 1999	Great Britain F5, Hatfield	Futures	Clay	(France) Sébastien de Chaunac	7–6, 1–6, 6–0
Loss	1–2	Jun 1999	Prague, Czech Republic	Challenger	Clay	(Czech Republic) Michal Tabara	4–6, 1–6
Win	2–2	Jul 2000	Montauban, France	Challenger	Clay	(Spain) Oscar Serrano-Gamez	6–2, 6–0
Loss	2–3	Mar 2002	Cherbourg, France	Challenger	Hard	(France) Lionel Roux	4–6, 7–5, 3–6
Loss	2–4	Apr 2002	Napoli, Italy	Challenger	Clay	(Spain) David Ferrer	1–6, 1–6
Loss	2–5	May 2002	Edinburgh, United Kingdom	Challenger	Clay	(Brazil) Alexandre Simoni	3–6, 3–6
Loss	2–6	Jul 2004	Oberstaufen, Germany	Challenger	Clay	(Germany) Dieter Kindlmann	7–6^{(8–6)}, 2–6, 4–6
Win	3–6	Aug 2004	St. Petersburg, Russia	Challenger	Clay	(Switzerland) Stan Wawrinka	3–6, 7–5, 7–5
Loss	3–7	Sep 2004	Seoul, South Korea	Challenger	Hard	(South Korea) Lee Hyung-taik	6–3, 5–7, 2–6
Win	4–7	May 2007	Bulgaria F3, Pleven	Futures	Clay	(Romania) Cătălin-Ionuț Gârd	6–3, 6–1
Win	5–7	Jun 2007	Bulgaria F4, Sofia	Futures	Clay	(Italy) Adriano Biasella	7–5, 6–7^{(6–8)}, 6–4
Loss	5–8	Jun 2007	France F8, Blois	Futures	Clay	(Spain) Daniel Muñoz de la Nava	5–7, 4–6
Win	6–8	Mar 2008	Croatia F4, Rovinj	Futures	Clay	(Austria) Christian Magg	6–3, 1–6, 6–2
Win	7–8	Mar 2008	Croatia F5, Vrsar	Futures	Clay	(Switzerland) Michael Lammer	4–6, 6–1, 6–1
Loss	7–9	Aug 2008	Italy F26, Bolzano	Futures	Clay	(Italy) Tomas Tenconi	6–7^{(5–7)}, 0–6
Loss	7–10	Apr 2009	France F7, Grasse	Futures	Clay	(France) Xavier Pujo	6–7^{(4–7)}, 6–2, 3–6
Loss	7–11	Jun 2009	Reggio Emilia, Italy	Challenger	Clay	(Italy) Paolo Lorenzi	5–7, 6–1, 2–6

=== Doubles: 11 (4–7) ===
Legend ATP Challenger (2–3) ITF Futures (2–4)	Finals by surface Hard (3–4) Clay (1–3) Grass (0–0) Carpet (0–0)

Result	W–L	Date	Tournament	Tier	Surface	Partner	Opponents	Score
Loss	0–1	May 1998	Germany F4, Esslingen	Futures	Clay	(France) Julien Boutter	(Argentina) Federico Browne (Argentina) Martín García	6–7, 2–6
Win	1–1	Sep 1998	France F5, Bagnères-de-Bigorre	Futures	Hard	(France) Michaël Llodra	(Senegal) Yahiya Doumbia (Switzerland) Lorenzo Manta	3–6, 6–3, 7–6
Loss	1–2	Sep 1998	France F7, Plaisir	Futures	Hard	(France) Michaël Llodra	(United States) Andrew Rueb (South Africa) Vaughan Snyman	4–6, 2–6
Win	2–2	Oct 1998	France F8, Nevers	Futures	Hard	(France) Michaël Llodra	(United States) Andrew Rueb (South Africa) Vaughan Snyman	6–3, 6–7, 6–3
Loss	2–3	Oct 1998	Great Britain F9, Leeds	Futures	Hard	(Australia) Ashley Naumann	(United Kingdom) Iain Bates (Germany) Alexander Popp	4–6, 6–4, 4–6
Loss	2–4	Jul 2000	Contrexéville, France	Challenger	Clay	(France) Olivier Patience	(France) Julien Benneteau (France) Nicolas Mahut	3–6, 6–7^{(4–7)}
Loss	2–5	Sep 2006	Orléans, France	Challenger	Hard	(France) Jérôme Haehnel	(France) Gregory Carraz (Belgium) Dick Norman	6–7^{(6–8)}, 1–6
Win	3–5	Feb 2007	Bergamo, Italy	Challenger	Hard	(France) Jérôme Haehnel	(Denmark) Kenneth Carlsen (Denmark) Frederik Nielsen	6–3, 2–6, [10–4]
Win	4–5	May 2007	Rijeka, Croatia	Challenger	Clay	(France) Jérôme Haehnel	(Slovakia) Ivo Klec (Slovakia) Lukáš Lacko	6–3, 6–4
Loss	4–6	Jul 2007	Montauban, France	Challenger	Clay	(Italy) Adriano Biasella	(Spain) Marc Fornell Mestres (Spain) Gabriel Trujillo Soler	3–6, 5–7
Loss	4–7	Sep 2007	France F13, Mulhouse	Futures	Hard	(Monaco) Guillaume Couillard	(Switzerland) Alexander Sadecky (South Africa) Izak van der Merwe	4–6, 7–6^{(7–4)}, [3–10]

== Performance timeline ==
Key
W	F	SF	QF	#R	RR	Q#	DNQ	A	NH

(W) winner; (F) finalist; (SF) semifinalist; (QF) quarterfinalist; (#R) rounds 4, 3, 2, 1; (RR) round-robin stage; (Q#) qualification round; (DNQ) did not qualify; (A) absent; (NH) not held; (SR) strike rate (events won / competed); (W–L) win–loss record.

=== Singles ===
Tournament	1998	1999	2000	2001	2002	2003	2004	2005	2006	2007	2008	2009	2010	2011	2012	SR	W–L	Win %
Grand Slam tournaments
Australian Open	A	A	Q2	1R	A	2R	1R	3R	1R	Q1	A	Q2	A	Q2	A	0 / 5	3–5	38%
French Open	Q1	1R	1R	2R	1R	2R	1R	1R	Q1	A	1R	1R	A	Q1	A	0 / 9	2–9	18%
Wimbledon	A	A	A	A	A	1R	A	2R	A	A	Q1	Q2	A	Q3	A	0 / 2	1–2	33%
US Open	A	Q3	Q1	A	2R	2R	A	Q3	Q2	A	A	A	A	2R	A	0 / 3	3–3	50%
Win–loss	0–0	0–1	0–1	1–2	1–2	3–4	0–2	3–3	0–1	0–0	0–1	0–1	0–0	1–1	0–0	0 / 19	9–19	32%
ATP Tour Masters 1000
Indian Wells Masters	A	A	A	A	A	Q2	Q1	1R	A	A	A	A	A	A	A	0 / 1	0–1	0%
Miami Open	A	A	A	A	A	2R	A	2R	A	A	A	A	A	A	A	0 / 2	2–2	50%
Monte-Carlo Masters	A	A	A	A	A	Q2	2R	2R	2R	Q1	1R	2R	A	1R	1R	0 / 7	4–7	36%
Italian Open	A	A	Q2	A	A	A	A	Q1	A	A	A	A	A	A	A	0 / 0	0–0	–
Hamburg Open	A	A	A	A	A	1R	Q2	Q1	A	A	Not Masters Series					0 / 1	0–1	0%
Canadian Open	A	A	A	A	A	A	A	Q1	Q2	A	A	A	A	A	A	0 / 0	0–0	–
Cincinnati Masters	A	A	Q1	A	A	A	A	A	A	A	A	A	A	A	A	0 / 0	0–0	–
Paris Masters	A	Q1	A	A	Q1	Q1	Q1	2R	A	A	A	A	A	A	A	0 /1	1–1	50%
Win–loss	0–0	0–0	0–0	0–0	0–0	1–2	1–1	3–4	1–1	0–0	0–1	1–1	0–0	0–1	0–1	0 / 12	7–12	37%

== External links and sources ==
- Jean-René Lisnard at the Association of Tennis Professionals
- Jean-René Lisnard at the International Tennis Federation
- Jean-René Lisnard at the Davis Cup (archived)
