= Camparini Gioielli Cup =

Defunct tennis tournament
- Event name: Camparini Gioielli Cup (men); Camparini Gioielli Cup – Trofeo Pompea ( 2011, women)
- Tour: ATP Tour (1990–99) (men); ITF Women's Circuit (2011)
- Founded: 2003 (men), 2011( women)
- Abolished: 2010 (men), 2011 (women)
- Editions: 8 (men), 1 (women)
- Location: Reggio Emilia, Italy
- Venue: Circolo Tennis Reggio Emilia
- Surface: Clay / outdoor
- Prize money: $50,000 (ITF Women's Circuit)
- Website: www.atptennisre.net

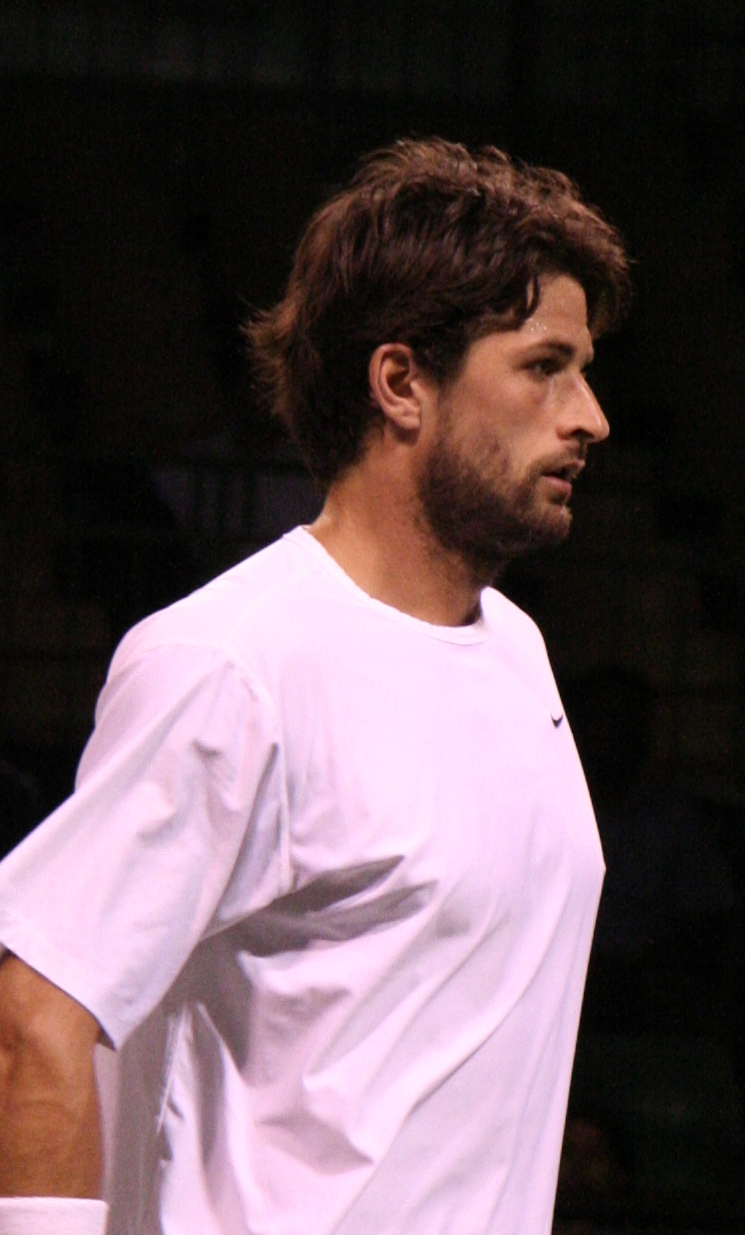
Olivier Patience found success twice in Reggio Emilia, winning back-to-back singles titles in 2006 and 2007

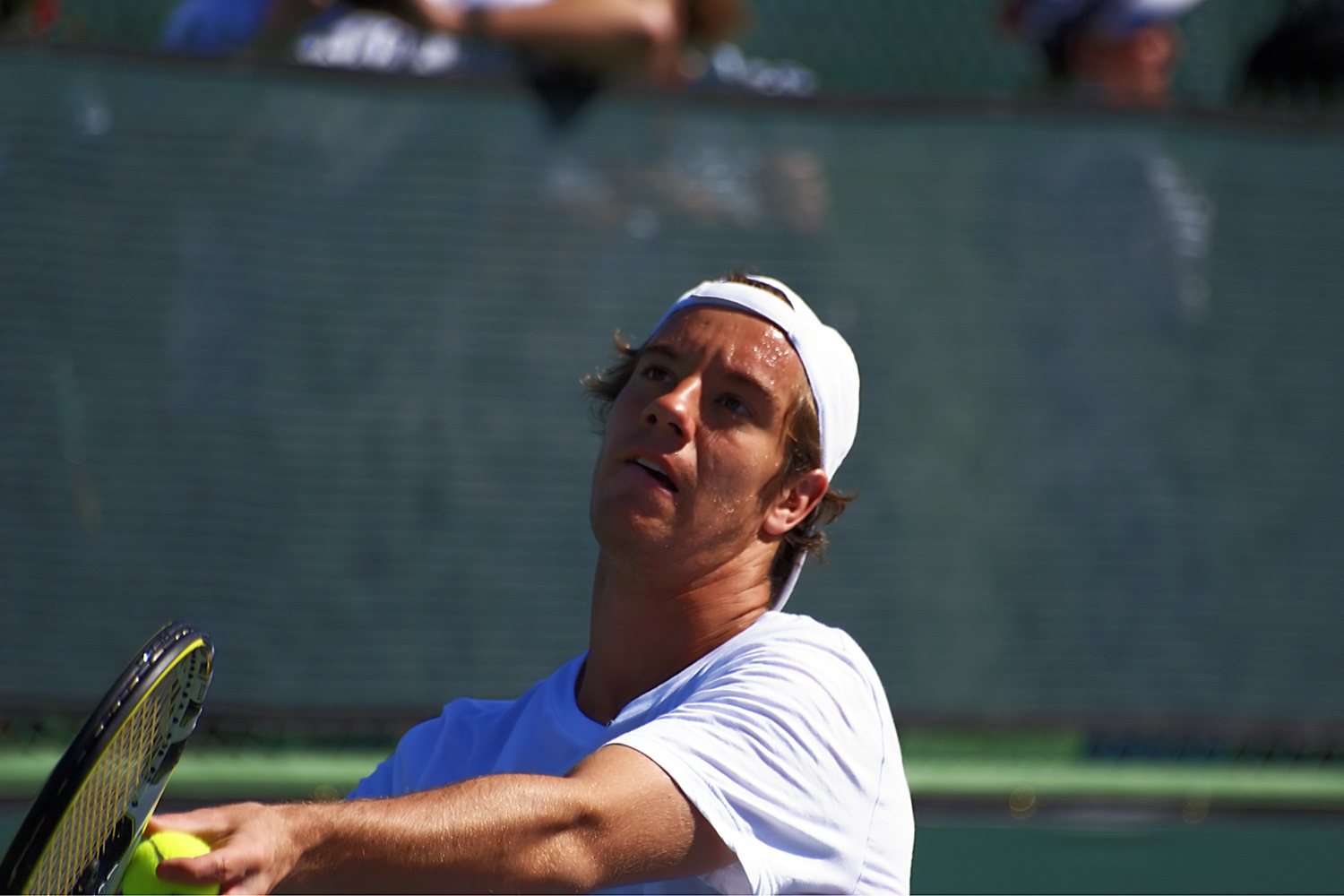
Eventual top tenner Richard Gasquet was the first of five Frenchmen to win the six singles titles since 2003

The Camparini Gioielli Cup was a professional tennis tournament played on outdoor red clay courts. It was part of the Association of Tennis Professionals (ATP) Challenger Tour and ITF Women's Circuit. It was held annually at the Circolo Tennis Reggio Emilia in Reggio Emilia, Italy, since 2003.

== Past finals ==
=== Men's singles ===
Year	Champion	Runner-up	Score
2010	(Argentina) Carlos Berlocq	(Spain) Pablo Andújar	6–0, 7–6(1)
2009	(Italy) Paolo Lorenzi	(Monaco) Jean-René Lisnard	7–5, 1–6, 6–2
2008	(France) Mathieu Montcourt	(Spain) Pablo Andújar	2–6, 6–2, 6–4
2007	(France) Olivier Patience (2)	(Spain) Félix Mantilla	6–7(6), 6–1, 7–6(6)
2006	(France) Olivier Patience (1)	(Argentina) Sergio Roitman	6–4, 5–7, 6–2
2005	(France) Thierry Ascione	(Argentina) Martín Vassallo Argüello	6–3, 6–0
2004	(France) Olivier Mutis	(Germany) Philipp Kohlschreiber	6–2, 0–6, 6–3
2003	(France) Richard Gasquet	(Italy) Potito Starace	7–5, 6–1

=== Men's doubles ===
Year	Champions	Runners-up	Score
2010	(Austria) Philipp Oswald (Austria) Martin Slanar	(Australia) Sadik Kadir (India) Purav Raja	6–2, 5–7, [10–6]
2009	(Spain) Miguel Ángel López Jaén (Spain) Pere Riba	(Italy) Gianluca Naso (Italy) Walter Trusendi	6–4, 6–4
2008	(China) Yu Xin-yuan (China) Zeng Shao-Xuan	(Argentina) Mariano Hood (Argentina) Leonardo Mayer	6–3, 6–4
2007	(Brazil) Franco Ferreiro (Algeria) Lamine Ouahab	(Uruguay) Pablo Cuevas (Argentina) Horacio Zeballos	6–4, 1–6, 10–4
2006	(Italy) Fabio Colangelo (Italy) Giancarlo Petrazzuolo	(Italy) Giorgio Galimberti (Italy) Alessandro Motti	6–3, 6–4
2005	(Georgia (country)) Irakli Labadze (Russia) Yuri Schukin	(Italy) Francesco Aldi (Italy) Tomas Tenconi	6–4, 6–3
2004	(Germany) Tomas Behrend (Italy) Tomas Tenconi	(Italy) Andreas Seppi (Italy) Simone Vagnozzi	6–4, 6–2
2003	(Australia) Joseph Sirianni (Netherlands) Rogier Wassen	(Italy) Alessio di Mauro (Italy) Vincenzo Santopadre	6–4, 6–4

=== Women's singles ===
Year	Champion	Runner-up	Score
2011	(United States) Sloane Stephens	(Belarus) Anastasiya Yakimova	6–3, 6–1

=== Women's doubles ===
Year	Champions	Runners-up	Score
2011	(Australia) Sophie Ferguson (Australia) Sally Peers	(Italy) Claudia Giovine (Argentina) María Irigoyen	6–4, 6–1
