= Tennis at the 2007 Games of the Small States of Europe =

- Date: 5–9 June
- Location: Monte Carlo Country Club

Champions

Men's singles
- Jean-René Lisnard (MON)

Women's singles
- Stephanie Vogt (LIE)

Men's doubles
- Guillaume Couillard / Jean-René Lisnard (MON)

Women's doubles
- Mandy Minella / Lynn Philippe (LUX)
← 2005 ·	Games of the Small States of Europe	· 2009 →

Tennis competitions at the 2007 Games of the Small States of Europe in Monaco were held from June 5 to June 9 at the Monte Carlo Country Club in neighbour Roquebrune-Cap-Martin in France. The tournament took place on Clay courts.

== Events ==
=== Men's singles ===
Round One
1	Stefano Galvani (SMR)	6	6
Jorge Vila Vila (AND)	1	0
Petros Baghdati (CYP)	6	6
Matija Pecotic (MLT)	4	0
3	Jean-René Lisnard (MON)	7	6
Jirka Lokaj (LIE)	5	1
Mike Scheidweiler (LUX)	6	6
Andri Jonsson (ISL)	0	1
Matthew Asciak (MLT)	6	6^{6}	6
Gilles Kremer (LUX)	0	7^{8}	4
Domenico Vicini (SMR)	3	4
4	Arnar Sigurdsson (ISL)	6	6
Christophe Koutrouza (CYP)	2	4
Paul Gerbaud Farra (AND)	6	6
Gian Carlo Besimo (LIE)	0	1
2	Benjamin Balleret (MON)	6	6

Quarter Finals
1	Stefano Galvani (SMR)	6	6
Petros Baghdati (CYP)	1	0
3	Jean-René Lisnard (MON)	6	6
Mike Scheidweiler (LUX)	1	2
Matthew Asciak (MLT)	2	3
4	Arnar Sigurdsson (ISL)	6	6
Paul Gerbaud Farra (AND)	1	1
2	Benjamin Balleret (MON)	6	6

Semi Finals
1	Stefano Galvani (SMR)	3	6^{6}
3	Jean-René Lisnard (MON)	6	7^{8}
4	Arnar Sigurdsson (ISL)	0	3
2	Benjamin Balleret (MON)	6	6

Final
3	Jean-René Lisnard (MON)	6	6
2	Benjamin Balleret (MON)	1	0

=== Women's singles ===
Round One
Marina Novak (LIE)	6	6
Emilia Milovanovic (MON)	3	4
Elaine Genovese (MLT)	6	6
Louise-Alice Gambarini (MON)	1	1

Quarter Finals
1	Claudine Schaul (LUX)	6	6
Sigurlaug Sigurdardott (ISL)	1	1
4	Lisa Camenzuli (MLT)	2	6	4
Marina Novak (LIE)	6	2	6
Elaine Genovese (MLT)	1	1
3	Stephanie Vogt (LIE)	6	6
Sandra Dís Kristjansdott (ISL)	0	0
2	Mandy Minella (LUX)	6	6

Semi Finals
1	Claudine Schaul (LUX)	6	4	6
Marina Novak (LIE)	2	6	3
3	Stephanie Vogt (LIE)	7^{7}	7^{7}
2	Mandy Minella (LUX)	6^{1}	6^{3}

Final
1	Claudine Schaul (LUX)	4	2
3	Stephanie Vogt (LIE)	6	6

=== Men's doubles ===
Quarterfinals
Guillaume Couillard (MON); Jean-René Lisnard (MON)	6	6
Petros Baghdati (CYP); Christophe Koutrouza (CYP)	1	4
Andri Jonsson (ISL); Arnar Sigurdsson (ISL)	6^{2}	4
Paul Gerbaud Farra (AND); Jorge Vila Vila (AND)	7^{7}	6
Gian Carlo Besimo (LIE); Jirka Lokaj (LIE)	4	1
Gilles Kremer (LUX); Mike Scheidweiler (LUX)	6	6
Matthew Asciak (MLT); Matija Pecotic (MLT)	5	4
Stefano Galvani (SMR); Domenico Vicini (SMR)	7	6

Semifinals
Guillaume Couillard (MON); Jean-René Lisnard (MON)	6	6
Paul Gerbaud Farra (AND); Jorge Vila Vila (AND)	0	1
Gilles Kremer (LUX); Mike Scheidweiler (LUX)	6	6^{5}	4
Stefano Galvani (SMR); Domenico Vicini (SMR)	1	7^{7}	6

Gold Medal match
Guillaume Couillard (MON); Jean-René Lisnard (MON)	6	4	6
Stefano Galvani (SMR); Domenico Vicini (SMR)	4	6	0

=== Women's doubles ===
Quarterfinals			Semifinals					Gold Medal match
			1	Mandy Minella (LUX); Lynn Philippe (LUX)	6	6
Sandra Dís Kristjansdott (ISL); Sigurlaug Sigurdardott (ISL)	3	2		Louise-Alice Gambarini (MON); Emilia Milovanovic (MON)	1	0
Louise-Alice Gambarini (MON); Emilia Milovanovic (MON)	6	6						1	Mandy Minella (LUX); Lynn Philippe (LUX)	6	7
								2	Marina Novak (LIE); Stephanie Vogt (LIE)	0	5
				Lisa Camenzuli (MLT); Sanya Jukic (MLT)	4	7^{7}	6^{10}
			2	Marina Novak (LIE); Stephanie Vogt (LIE)	6	6^{3}	7^{12}
