= Arnar Sigurðsson =

Icelandic tennis player

- Country (sports): Iceland
- Born: 24 November 1981 (age 44) Reykjavík, Iceland
- Prize money: $10,372

Singles
- Career record: 39–12 (at ATP Tour level, Grand Slam level, and in Davis Cup)
- Career titles: 0
- Highest ranking: No. 703 (7 May 2007)

Doubles
- Career record: 25–19 (at ATP Tour level, Grand Slam level, and in Davis Cup)
- Career titles: 3 ITF
- Highest ranking: No. 518 (8 October 2007)
Medal record
Men's tennis
Representing Iceland
Games of the Small States of Europe
| Bronze medal – third place | 2005 La Massana | Singles |
| Bronze medal – third place | 2005 La Massana | Doubles |
| Bronze medal – third place | 2007 Monte Carlo | Singles |
| Bronze medal – third place | 2009 Nicosia | Doubles |

Arnar Sigurðsson (born 24 November 1981) is a retired tennis player from Iceland. He was a decorated NCAA men's college tennis performer at the University of the Pacific in Stockton, California. He earned four letters at Pacific (2002–05) and graduated in 2006. He holds school records for most career wins (175), most career singles wins (98), most singles wins in a season (34), highest career winning percentage (.784) and highest singles winning percentage in a season (.895). He earned Big West Player of the Year honors in 2005 and won a Big West-best seven Athlete of the Week awards in his career.

Sigurðsson had a career high ATP singles ranking of 703 achieved on 7 May 2007. He also had a career high ATP doubles ranking of 518 achieved on 8 October 2007. Sigurðsson holds the record for the number of Icelandic national titles, winning 15 singles, 15 doubles and 8 mixed doubles titles in his career.

Sigurðsson represented Iceland at the Davis Cup, where he had a W/L record of 64–31. He holds the most Davis Cup victories for Iceland and was awarded with the Davis Cup Commitment Award.

== Future and Challenger finals ==
=== Doubles 5 (3–2) ===
| Legend (doubles) ATP Challenger Tour (0–0) ITF Futures Tour (3–2) | Titles by surface Hard (2–1) Clay (1–1) Grass (0–0) Carpet (0–0) |

| Result | W–L | Date | Tournament | Tier | Surface | Partner | Opponents | Score |
|---|---|---|---|---|---|---|---|---|
| Win | 1–0 | Oct 2006 | Mexico F19, Monterrey | Futures | Hard | (United Kingdom) Simon Childs | (Switzerland) Alexander Sadecky (Croatia) Franko Škugor | 7–6^{(7–4)}, 6–3 |
| Loss | 1–1 | Apr 2007 | Turkey F2, Manavgat | Futures | Clay | (United States) Brett Ross | (Belgium) Steve Darcis (Netherlands) Fred Hemmes Jr. | 2–6, 4–6 |
| Loss | 1–2 | Jun 2007 | Norway F2, Gausdal | Futures | Hard | (South Africa) Heinrich Heyl | (Denmark) Jacob Melskens (Denmark) Rasmus Nørby | 3–6, 4–6 |
| Win | 2–2 | Sep 2007 | United States F23, Costa Mesa | Futures | Hard | (United States) Brad Pomeroy | (Canada) Philip Bester (United States) Glenn Weiner | 3–6, 6–3, [10–4] |
| Win | 3–2 | Sep 2007 | Mexico F6, Monterrey | Futures | Clay | (New Zealand) Adam Thompson | (Germany) Peter Gojowczyk (Germany) Marc Sieber | 6–2, 6–1 |
