= Olivier Patience =

French tennis player

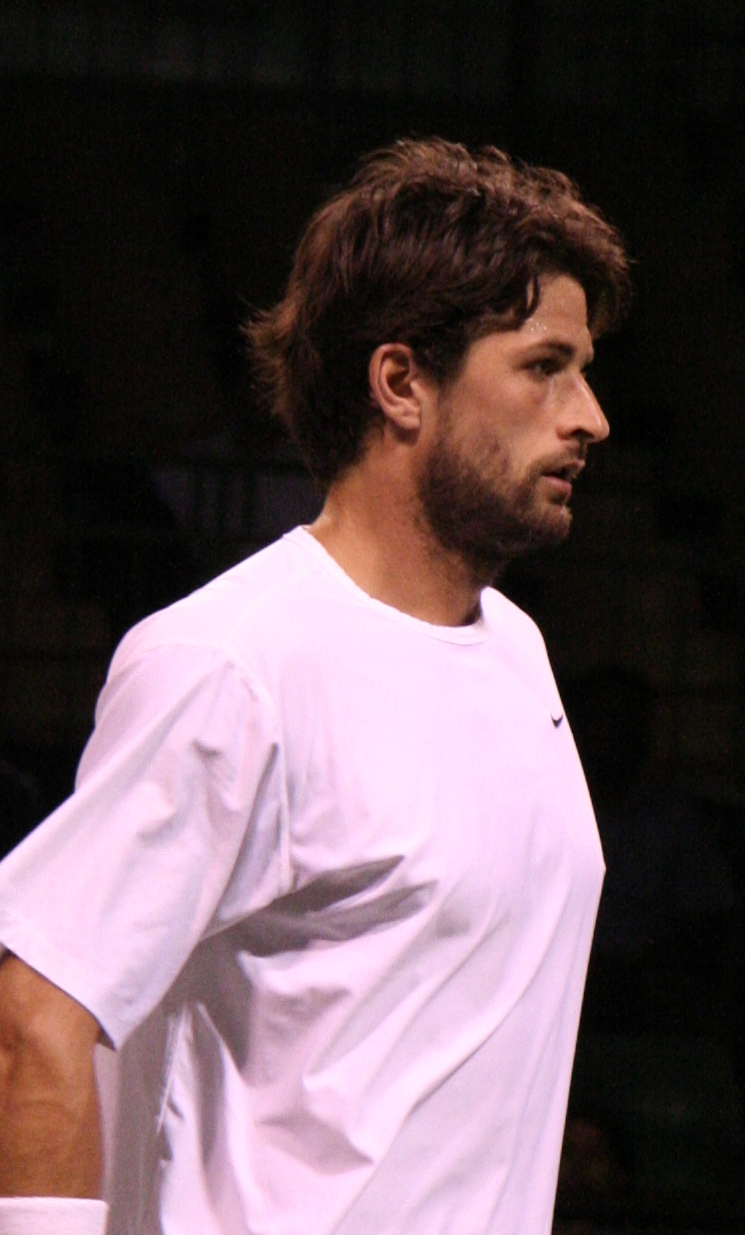
- Country (sports): France
- Residence: Boulogne-Billancourt, France
- Born: 25 March 1980 (age 46) Évreux, France
- Height: 1.80 m (5 ft 11 in)
- Turned pro: 1998
- Retired: 2012
- Plays: Right-handed (one-handed backhand)
- Prize money: US $1,030,897

Singles
- Career record: 26–53 (at ATP Tour-level, Grand Slam-level, and in Davis Cup)
- Career titles: 0
- Highest ranking: No. 87 (19 July 2004)

Grand Slam singles results
- Australian Open: 3R (2004)
- French Open: 3R (2007)
- Wimbledon: 1R (2004)
- US Open: 1R (2004, 2006)

Doubles
- Career record: 5–20 (at ATP Tour-level, Grand Slam-level, and in Davis Cup)
- Career titles: 0
- Highest ranking: No. 206 (24 July 2000)

Grand Slam doubles results
- Australian Open: 1R (2007)
- French Open: 2R (2000, 2008)

Olivier Patience (French: [ɔlivje pasjɑ̃s]; born 25 March 1980) is a former French professional tennis player. His career high Association of Tennis Professionals (ATP) singles ranking was world no. 87, on 19 July 2004. During 2006, Patience won three ATP Challenger Series tournaments. He reached the third round at the 2004 Australian Open and 2007 French Open. In the latter, he defeated Jonathan Eysseric in the first round in four sets, and then Mariano Zabaleta, 7–5, 6–3, 3–6, 2–6, 6–4, eventually losing to Novak Djokovic in five sets, 6–7, 6–2, 6–3, 6–7, 3–6.

== Singles titles ==
=== Wins (10) ===
Legend (singles)
Grand Slam (0)
Tennis Masters Cup (0)
ATP Masters Series (0)
ATP Tour (0)
Challengers (10)

No.	Date	Tournament	Surface	Opponent	Score
1.	13 May 2002	Prague, Czech Republic	Clay	(Australia) Todd Larkham	4–6, 7–5, 6–3
2.	18 August 2003	Manerbio, Italy	Clay	(Argentina) Martín Vassallo Argüello	3–6, 6–3, 7–6^{3}
3.	21 March 2005	Saint-Brieuc, France	Clay	(Romania) Victor Ioniță	6–0, 6–2
4.	25 April 2005	Rome, Italy	Clay	(France) Florent Serra	7–6^{4}, 7–5
5.	26 December 2005	Doha, Qatar	Hard	(France) Julien Benneteau	2–6, 6–4, 7–6^{5}
6.	15 May 2006	San Remo, Italy	Clay	(Italy) Stefano Galvani	6–2, 4–6, 7–6^{8}
7.	12 June 2006	Lugano, Switzerland	Clay	(Spain) Guillermo García López	6–4, 6–1
8.	26 June 2006	Reggio Emilia, Italy	Clay	(Argentina) Sergio Roitman	6–4, 5–7, 6–2
9.	25 June 2007	Reggio Emilia, Italy	Clay	(Spain) Félix Mantilla	^{6}6–7, 6–1, 7–6^{6}
10.	2 September 2008	Cherkasy, Ukraine	Clay	(Uzbekistan) Denis Istomin	6–2, 6–0

=== Runners-up (3) ===
No.	Date	Tournament	Surface	Opponent	Score
1.	19 March 2007	Rabat, Morocco	Clay	(Italy) Stefano Galvani	6–1, 6–1
2.	4 September 2007	Brașov, Romania	Clay	(Argentina) Máximo González	6–4, 6–3
3.	6 October 2008	Florianópolis, Brazil	Clay	(Chile) Nicolás Massú	^{4}6–7, 6–2, 6–1

== Doubles titles ==
=== Wins (1) ===
Legend (doubles)
Grand Slam (0)
Tennis Masters Cup (0)
ATP Masters Series (0)
ATP Tour (0)
Challengers (1)

No.	Date	Tournament	Surface	Partnering	Opponent	Score
1.	18 April 2005	Monza, Italy	Clay	(France) Nicolas Devilder	(Italy) Massimo Bertolini (Italy) Uros Vico	7–5, 6–4
