= 2007 Games of the Small States of Europe =

Twelfth edition of the Games of the Small States of Europe

XII Games of the Small States of Europe XII Jeux des petits États d'Europe
- Country: Monaco
- Nations: 8
- Events: 121 in 11 sports
- Opening: 4 June 2007
- Closing: 9 June 2007
- Opened by: Prince Albert II
- Main venue: Stade Louis II
- Website: www.monaco2007.mc

The 2007 Games of the Small States of Europe, or the XIIth Games of the Small States of Europe, were held in Monaco from 4 to 9 June 2007. The Games administration was done jointly by the Monegasque government and Monegasque Olympic Committee. Monaco had previously hosted the games in 1987. Prince Albert II officially opened the Games.

== Overview and participation ==
The 2007 Games were the first Games of the Small States of Europe without all eligible nations competing. All countries to have previously participated returned; however, Montenegro – which joined the Athletic Association of the Small States of Europe in 2006 – did not send competitors to the 2007 Games. Delegations, including coaches and team officials, of up to 1,200 people were expected at the 2007 Games. These delegations came from the host nation of Monaco as well as Andorra, Cyprus, Iceland, Liechtenstein, Luxembourg, Malta, and San Marino.

== Competitions ==
Twelve disciplines were held at the 2007 Games; making it the most diverse Games in this respect yet. Taekwondo and cycling had been removed from the games; however, the volleyball discipline had been separated into beach and traditional, and bowls made its first appearance at the games.

Numbers in parentheses indicate the number of medal events contested in each sport.

- Athletics (35)
- Basketball (2)
- Boules (2)
- Gymnastics (2)
- Judo (16)
- Sailing (16)
- Shooting (3)
- Swimming (32)
- Table tennis (6)
- Tennis (4)
- Volleyball (2)

== Highlights ==
- Two Maltese sailing competitors, Thomas Tabona and Ella Soler, were 13 and 14 years old respectively.
- Landlocked San Marino won a silver medal in sailing.

== Medal Count ==
* Host nation (Monaco)

Rank	Nation	Gold	Silver	Bronze	Total
1	Cyprus (CYP)	36	33	24	93
2	Iceland (ISL)	31	23	24	78
3	Luxembourg (LUX)	20	25	36	81
4	Monaco (MON)*	19	16	17	52
5	Malta (MLT)	4	9	17	30
6	Andorra (AND)	4	6	7	17
7	San Marino (SMR)	4	6	6	16
8	Liechtenstein (LIE)	3	5	5	13
Totals (8 entries)		121	123	136	380

== Venues ==
The 2007 Games used a docked cruise ship as an athlete's village for all delegations. The ship was docked along the sea wall in Fontvieille.

Many of the events were also held in Fontvieille. Stade Louis II, the usual home of AS Monaco FC, hosted athletics, basketball, swimming, and table tennis events. The shooting events took place indoors on the upper floors of a building in the center of the district as well.

Gymnastics took place in the Canton Hall, a large event complex in Monaco. Volleyball took place in the Moneghetti Sports Complex, which is technically in French territory. Judo events was also held at an all-purpose gymnasium, the Annonciade Gymnasium. Bowls events were held at the Rocher. Tennis was held in the Monte Carlo district at a prominent country club.

Additionally, many of events in the 2007 Games took advantage of Monaco's close proximity to the sea. Beach volleyball events were held on the most prominent beach in Monaco, Larvotto. Sailing events took place in the Bay of Monaco, an extension of the Mediterranean Sea.

== See also ==
- Games of the Small States of Europe
- Monaco 2007
