= 2009 Games of the Small States of Europe =

International multi-sport event

XIII Games of the Small States of Europe XIII Αγώνες των Μικρών Κρατών της Ευρώπης
- Logo inspired by the Kyrenia ship
- Country: Cyprus
- Nations: 8
- Athletes: 843
- Events: 120 in 9 sports
- Opening: 1 June 2009
- Closing: 6 June 2009
- Opened by: Dimitris Christofias
- Website: cyprus2009.org.cy

The 2009 Games of the Small States of Europe, also known as the XIIIth Games of the Small States of Europe were held in June 2009 among the participant nations in the Games of the Small States of Europe. The opening ceremonies were on 1 June, and the closing ceremonies on 6 June. The games were held in Cyprus, twenty years after the first Games were held there in 1989. Malta was scheduled for 2009 in the rotation, but were selected to host the games early in 2003. The organizing committee estimated the cost at 1.5 million euros for all events.

== Overview ==
The opening ceremony took place at the New GSP Stadium. A world premiere composed by David Foster was performed by tenor Mario Frangoulis on Monday 1 June 2009. The principal sponsor of the event was Coca-Cola in a deal worth €140,000.

== Participants ==
Participating countries were:

1. Andorra
2. Cyprus
3. Iceland
4. Liechtenstein
5. Luxembourg
6. Malta
7. Monaco
8. San Marino

Montenegro, although eligible, did not participate. A record 1,500 athletes were expected to participate in the event.

== Official logo and mascot ==
Tefkros, the official mascot

The official logo and the mascot, Tefkros the dove were revealed on the official website on 14 May 2008.

== Events ==
Numbers in parentheses indicate the number of medal events contested in each sport.

- Athletics (35)
- Basketball (2)
- Gymnastics (2)
- Judo (16)
- Mountain biking (2)
- Sailing (16)
- Shooting (3)
- Swimming (32)
- Table tennis (6)
- Tennis (4)
- Volleyball (2)

=== Calendar ===
●	Opening Ceremony	●	Events	●	Finals	●	Closing Ceremony

	Data					
Sport	01.06	02.06	03.06	04.06	05.06	06.06
Ceremony	●					●
Athletics		●		●		●
Beach volley		●	●	●	●	
Gymnastics		●	●		●	●
Judo		●	●		●	
Mountain biking				●		
Swimming		●	●	●	●	
Basketball		●	●	●	●	●
Volleyball		●	●	●	●	●
Tennis		●	●	●	●	●
Table Tennis		●	●	●	●	●
Shooting		●	●	●	●	
Sailing		●	●	●	●	

== Venues ==
The majority of events (6 of 12) were held in venues in Nicosia. The southern city of Limassol hosted Beach Volleyball, Gymnastics, Sailing and Swimming, whilst the Mountain Bike events were held at the National Park of Machairas at an average altitude of 700m.

	Venues	City/Locality
Athletics	GSP Stadium	Nicosia
Basketball	Eleftheria Indoor Hall	Nicosia
Beach Volley	Sailing Centre	Limassol
Cycling	Mountain Bike Track	Machairas
Gymnastics	Palais de Sport	Limassol
Judo	Lefkotheo Indoor Hall	Nicosia
Sailing	Sailing Centre	Limassol
Shooting	Olympic Shooting Range	Nicosia
Swimming	Limassol Swimming Pool	Limassol
Table Tennis	Evangelos Florakis Indoor Hall	Nicosia
Tennis	National Tennis Centre	Nicosia
Volleyball	University of Cyprus Sports hall	Nicosia
Opening and closing ceremonies	GSP Stadium	Nicosia

== Media coverage ==
Lumiere TV and the Cyprus Broadcasting Corporation covered the event. Live transmission through Hellas Sat of many events was covered in High Definition. Two daily summaries were also released.

== Medal Count ==
Final Medal Table

* Host nation (Cyprus)

Rank	Nation	Gold	Silver	Bronze	Total
1	Cyprus (CYP)*	59	47	33	139
2	Iceland (ISL)	32	24	25	81
3	Luxembourg (LUX)	26	17	19	62
4	Monaco (MON)	7	18	17	42
5	San Marino (SMR)	4	9	16	29
6	Malta (MLT)	3	5	13	21
7	Liechtenstein (LIE)	2	4	12	18
8	Andorra (AND)	1	7	9	17
Totals (8 entries)		134	131	144	409
