= Tennis at the 2023 Games of the Small States of Europe =

- Date: 29 May – 3 June
- Location: Marsa Sports Club, Marsa, Malta

Champions

Men's singles
- Matija Pecotić (MLT)

Women's singles
- Victoria Jiménez Kasintseva (AND)

Men's doubles
- Matthew Asciak / Matija Pecotić (MLT)

Women's doubles
- Francesca Curmi / Elaine Genovese (MLT)

Mixed doubles
- Maria Constantinou / Eleftherios Neos (CYP)
← 2019 ·	Games of the Small States of Europe	· 2025 →

The tennis competitions at the 2023 Games of the Small States of Europe was held from 29 May to 3 June 2023 at the Marsa Sports Club, Malta.

== Medal table ==
* Host nation (Malta)

Rank	Nation	Gold	Silver	Bronze	Total
1	Malta (MLT)*	3	1	2	6
2	Cyprus (CYP)	1	1	3	5
3	Andorra (AND)	1	0	0	1
4	Luxembourg (LUX)	0	2	2	4
5	Monaco (MON)	0	1	1	2
Totals (5 entries)		5	5	8	18

== Medal events ==
Event	Gold	Silver	Bronze
Men's singles	Matija Pecotić; Malta	Lucas Catarina; Monaco	Stylianos Christodoulou; Cyprus
Men's singles	Matija Pecotić; Malta	Lucas Catarina; Monaco	Petros Chrysochos; Cyprus
Women's singles	Victoria Jiménez Kasintseva; Andorra	Francesca Curmi; Malta	Elaine Genovese; Malta
Women's singles	Victoria Jiménez Kasintseva; Andorra	Francesca Curmi; Malta	Marie Weckerle; Luxembourg
Men's doubles	Malta; Matthew Asciak; Matija Pecotić	Cyprus; Sergis Kyratzis; Eleftherios Neos	Luxembourg; Raphael Calzi; Alex Knaff
Men's doubles	Malta; Matthew Asciak; Matija Pecotić	Cyprus; Sergis Kyratzis; Eleftherios Neos	Monaco; Lucas Catarina; Valentin Vacherot
Women's doubles	Malta; Francesca Curmi; Elaine Genovese	Luxembourg; Eléonora Molinaro; Marie Weckerle	Cyprus; Klio Maria Ioannou; Maria Constantinou
Mixed doubles	Cyprus; Maria Constantinou; Eleftherios Neos	Luxembourg; Eléonora Molinaro; Alex Knaff	Malta; Matthew Asciak; Elaine Genovese

== Men's singles ==
=== Seeds ===
1. (Monaco) Valentin Vacherot (quarterfinals)
2. (Monaco) Lucas Catarina (final)

3. (Luxembourg) Alex Knaff (quarterfinals)
4. (Malta) Matija Pecotić (champion)

First round
1	(Monaco) V Vacherot	6	6
(Iceland) V Ristic	0	0
(Cyprus) P Chrysochos	6	6
(San Marino) JL Chapman	0	1
4	(Malta) M Pecotić	6	6
(Andorra) D Gelabert	0	2
(Liechtenstein) M Glauser	1	0
(Luxembourg) R Calzi	6	6
(Cyprus) S Christodoulou	6	6
(Iceland) A Magnússon	0	1
(Andorra) È Cervós Noguer	5	2
3	(Luxembourg) A Knaff	7	6
(Malta) M Asciak	2	6	6
(San Marino) M De Rossi	6	4	1
(Liechtenstein) S Zünd	6	2
2	(Monaco) L Catarina	7	6

Quarterfinals
1	(Monaco) V Vacherot	4	5
(Cyprus) P Chrysochos	6	7
4	(Malta) M Pecotić	6	6
(Luxembourg) R Calzi	2	2
(Cyprus) S Christodoulou	6	4	6
3	(Luxembourg) A Knaff	3	6	4
(Malta) M Asciak	2	1^{r}
2	(Monaco) L Catarina	6	4

Semifinals
(Cyprus) P Chrysochos	0	0
4	(Malta) M Pecotić	6	6
(Cyprus) S Christodoulou	6	4	5
2	(Monaco) L Catarina	4	6	7

Gold match medal
4	(Malta) M Pecotić	6	6
2	(Monaco) L Catarina	1	2
