= 2021 ITF Women's World Tennis Tour =

Details
- Duration: 4 January 2021 – 2 January 2022
- Edition: 28th
- Tournaments: 373
- Categories: W100 tournaments (6); W80 tournaments (8); W60 tournaments (31); W25 tournaments (113); W15 tournaments (215)

Achievements (singles)
- Most titles: (Latvia) Darja Semenistaja (7)
- Most finals: (Hungary) Panna Udvardy (8)

The 2021 International Tennis Federation (ITF) Women's World Tennis Tour is the entry-level and mid-level tour for women's professional tennis. It is organized by the International Tennis Federation and is a tier below the Women's Tennis Association (WTA) Tour. The ITF Women's World Tennis Tour provides a professional pathway between the ITF Junior World Tennis Tour and the WTA Tour. The results of ITF tournaments are incorporated into the WTA ranking, which enables professionals to progress through to the elite levels of women's professional tennis. The ITF Women's World Tennis Tour offers approximately 500 tournaments across 65 countries and incorporates five prize money levels of tournaments: $15,000, $25,000, $60,000, $80,000 and $100,000

Tournaments at $15,000 level include reserved main draw places for Top-100 ranked ITF Juniors, providing a smooth pathway for the best new talent to break through into elite professional tennis. The ITF Women's World Tennis Tour is also designed to target prize money effectively to help reduce costs for players and ultimately enable more players to make a living.

== Participating host nations ==
- Argentina (ARG)
- Austria (AUT)
- Belgium (BEL)
- Bosnia and Herzegovina (BIH)
- Brazil (BRA)
- Bulgaria (BUL)
- Chile (CHI)
- Colombia (COL)
- Croatia (CRO)
- Czech Republic (CZE)
- Denmark (DEN)
- Dominican Republic (DOM)
- Ecuador (ECU)
- Egypt (EGY)
- Estonia (EST)
- Finland (FIN)
- France (FRA)
- Georgia (GEO)
- Germany (GER)
- Great Britain (GBR)
- Greece (GRE)
- Guatemala (GUA)
- Hungary (HUN)
- India (IND)
- Israel (ISR)
- Italy (ITA)
- Kazakhstan (KAZ)
- Latvia (LAT)
- Lithuania (LTU)
- Luxembourg (LUX)
- Mexico (MEX)
- Netherlands (NED)
- Paraguay (PAR)
- Peru (PER)
- Poland (POL)
- Portugal (POR)
- Russia (RUS)
- Serbia (SRB)
- Slovakia (SVK)
- Slovenia (SLO)
- South Africa (RSA)
- Spain (ESP)
- Sweden (SWE)
- Switzerland (SUI)
- Tunisia (TUN)
- Turkey (TUR)
- Ukraine (UKR)
- United Arab Emirates (UAE)
- United States (USA)

== Tournament breakdown by event category ==
Event category	Number of events	Total prize money
W100	6	$600,000
W80	8	$640,000
W60	31	$1,860,000
W25	113	$2,825,000
W15	215	$3,225,000
Total	373	$9,150,000

== WTA ranking points distribution ==
From 4 January to 4 April

Category	W	F	SF	QF	R16	R32	R64	Q	FQR	Q2	Q1
W100+H (48S, 32Q)	150	90	55	28	14	7	1	6	4	–	–
W100+H (32S, 32/24Q)	150	90	55	28	14	1	–	6	4	–	–
W100+H (32S, 48/64Q)	150	90	55	28	14	1	–	6	4	2	–
W100+H (16D)	150	90	55	28	1	–	–	–	–	–	–
W100 (48S, 32Q)	140	85	50	25	13	6	1	6	4	–	–
W100 (32S, 32/24Q)	140	85	50	25	13	1	–	6	4	–	–
W100 (32S, 48/64Q)	140	85	50	25	13	1	–	6	4	2	–
W100 (16D)	140	85	50	25	1	–	–	–	–	–	–
W80+H (48S, 32Q)	130	80	48	24	12	6	1	5	3	–	–
W80+H (32S, 32/24Q)	130	80	48	24	12	1	–	5	3	–	–
W80+H (32S, 48/64Q)	130	80	48	24	12	1	–	5	3	1	–
W80+H (16D)	130	80	48	24	1	–	–	–	–	–	–
W80 (48S, 32Q)	115	70	42	21	10	5	1	5	3	–	–
W80 (32S, 32/24Q)	115	70	42	21	10	1	–	5	3	–	–
W80 (32S, 48/64Q)	115	70	42	21	10	1	–	5	3	1	–
W80 (16D)	115	70	42	21	1	–	–	–	–	–	–
W60+H (48S, 32Q)	100	60	36	18	9	5	1	5	3	–	–
W60+H (32S, 32/24Q)	100	60	36	18	9	1	–	5	3	–	–
W60+H (32S, 48/64Q)	100	60	36	18	9	1	–	5	3	1	–
W60+H (16D)	100	60	36	18	1	–	–	–	–	–	–
W60 (48S, 32Q)	80	48	29	15	8	5	1	5	3	–	–
W60 (32S, 32/24Q)	80	48	29	15	8	1	–	5	3	–	–
W60 (32S, 48/64Q)	80	48	29	15	8	1	–	5	3	1	–
W60 (16D)	80	48	29	15	1	–	–	–	–	–	–
W25+H (48S, 32Q)	60	36	22	11	6	3	1	2	–	–	–
W25+H (32S, 32/24Q)	60	36	22	11	6	1	–	2	–	–	–
W25+H (32S, 48/64Q)	60	36	22	11	6	1	–	2	1	–	–
W25+H (16D)	60	36	22	11	1	–	–	–	–	–	–
W25 (48S, 32Q)	50	30	18	9	5	3	1	2	–	–	–
W25 (32S, 32/24Q)	50	30	18	9	5	–	–	1	–	–	–
W25 (32S, 48/64Q)	50	30	18	9	5	–	–	2	1	–	–
W25 (16D)	50	30	18	9	1	–	–	–	–	–	–
W15/W15+H (32S, 32/24Q)	10	6	4	2	1	–	–	1	–	–	–
W15/W15+H (32S, 48/64Q)	10	6	4	3	2	–	–	1	–	–	–
W15/W15+H (16D)	10	6	4	1	–	–	–	–	–	–	–

- "+H" indicates that hospitality is provided.
From 5 April to 27 December

Due to the COVID-19 disruption of the tour calendar resulting in a reduction of playing opportunities for players, the ITF and WTA decided to increase WTA ranking points earned in the categories W25 through to W80 for the remainder of the year.

Category	W	F	SF	QF	R16	R32	R64	Q	FQR	Q2	Q1
W100+H (48S, 32Q)	150	90	55	28	14	7	1	6	4	–	–
W100+H (32S, 32/24Q)	150	90	55	28	14	1	–	6	4	–	–
W100+H (32S, 48/64Q)	150	90	55	28	14	1	–	6	4	2	–
W100+H (16D)	150	90	55	28	1	–	–	–	–	–	–
W100 (48S, 32Q)	140	85	50	25	13	6	1	6	4	–	–
W100 (32S, 32/24Q)	140	85	50	25	13	1	–	6	4	–	–
W100 (32S, 48/64Q)	140	85	50	25	13	1	–	6	4	2	–
W100 (16D)	140	85	50	25	1	–	–	–	–	–	–
W80+H (48S, 32Q)	130	80	48	24	12	6	1	5	3	–	–
W80+H (32S, 32/24Q)	130	80	48	24	12	1	–	5	3	–	–
W80+H (32S, 48/64Q)	130	80	48	24	12	1	–	5	3	1	–
W80+H (16D)	130	80	48	24	1	–	–	–	–	–	–
W80 (48S, 32Q)	120	72	43	22	11	5	1	5	3	–	–
W80 (32S, 32/24Q)	120	72	43	22	11	1	–	5	3	–	–
W80 (32S, 48/64Q)	120	72	43	22	11	1	–	5	3	1	–
W80 (16D)	120	72	43	22	1	–	–	–	–	–	–
W60+H (48S, 32Q)	110	66	40	20	10	5	1	5	3	–	–
W60+H (32S, 32/24Q)	110	66	40	20	10	1	–	5	3	–	–
W60+H (32S, 48/64Q)	110	66	40	20	10	1	–	5	3	1	–
W60+H (16D)	110	66	40	20	1	–	–	–	–	–	–
W60 (48S, 32Q)	96	58	35	18	9	5	1	5	3	–	–
W60 (32S, 32/24Q)	96	58	35	18	9	1	–	5	3	–	–
W60 (32S, 48/64Q)	96	58	35	18	9	1	–	5	3	1	–
W60 (16D)	96	58	35	18	1	–	–	–	–	–	–
W25+H (48S, 32Q)	78	47	28	14	8	3	1	2	–	–	–
W25+H (32S, 32/24Q)	78	47	28	14	8	1	–	2	–	–	–
W25+H (32S, 48/64Q)	78	47	28	14	8	1	–	2	1	–	–
W25+H (16D)	78	47	28	14	1	–	–	–	–	–	–
W25 (48S, 32Q)	65	40	25	13	7	3	1	2	–	–	–
W25 (32S, 32/24Q)	65	40	25	13	7	–	–	1	–	–	–
W25 (32S, 48/64Q)	65	40	25	13	7	–	–	2	1	–	–
W25 (16D)	65	40	25	13	1	–	–	–	–	–	–
W15/W15+H (32S, 32/24Q)	10	6	4	2	1	–	–	1	–	–	–
W15/W15+H (32S, 48/64Q)	10	6	4	3	2	–	–	1	–	–	–
W15/W15+H (16D)	10	6	4	1	–	–	–	–	–	–	–

- "+H" indicates that hospitality is provided.

== Prize money distribution ==
Category	W	F	SF	QF	R16	R32	R64	FQR	Q2	Q1
W100/W100+H (48S, 32Q)	$12,285	$6,495	$3,846	$2,378	$1,559	$926	$415	$381.75	–	$237
W100/W100+H (32S, 32/24Q)	$15,239	$8,147	$4,473	$2,573	$1,559	$926	–	$509	–	$316
W100/W100+H (32S, 48/64Q)	$15,239	$8,147	$4,473	$2,573	$1,559	$926	–	$381.75	$237	–
W100/W100+H (16D)	$5,573	$2,787	$1,393	$760	$507	–	–	–	–	–
W80/W80+H (48S, 32Q)	$9,798	$5,178	$3,077	$1,904	$1,248	$740	$335	$305.25	–	$189.75
W80/W80+H (32S, 32/24Q)	$12,192	$6,518	$3,580	$2,059	$1,248	$740	–	$407	–	$253
W80/W80+H (32S, 48/64Q)	$12,192	$6,518	$3,580	$2,059	$1,248	$740	–	$305.25	$189.75	–
W80/W80+H (16D)	$4,460	$2,230	$1,115	$608	$405	–	–	–	–	–
W60/W60+H (48S, 32Q)	$7,344	$3,882	$2,308	$1,427	$935	$557	$251	$228.75	–	$141.75
W60/W60+H (32S, 32/24Q)	$9,142	$4,886	$2,683	$1,543	$935	$557	–	$305	–	$189
W60/W60+H (32S, 48/64Q)	$9,142	$4,886	$2,683	$1,543	$935	$557	–	$228.75	$141.75	–
W60/W60+H (16D)	$3,344	$1,672	$836	$456	$304	–	–	–	–	–
W25/W25+H (48S, 32Q)	$3,188	$1,684	$1,001	$617	$408	$244	$107	$96.50	–	$50
W25/W25+H (32S, 32/24Q)	$3,935	$2,107	$1,162	$672	$408	$244	–	$126	–	$68
W25/W25+H (32S, 48/64Q)	$3,935	$2,107	$1,162	$672	$408	$244	–	$96.50	$50	–
W25/W25+H (16D)	$1,437	$719	$359	$196	$131	–	–	–	–	–
W15/W15+H (32S, 32/24Q)	$2,352	$1,470	$734	$367	$294	$147	–	–	–	–
W15/W15+H (32S, 48/64Q)	$2,352	$1,470	$734	$367	$294	$147	–	–	–	–
W15/W15+H (16D)	$955	$515	$294	$147	$74	–	–	–	–	–

- All prize money in $USD
- Doubles prize money per team

== Statistics ==
=== Key ===
Category
W100 tournaments
W80 tournaments
W60 tournaments
W25 tournaments
W15 tournaments

These tables present the number of singles (S) and doubles (D) titles won by each player and each nation during the season. The players/nations are sorted by:

1. Total number of titles (a doubles title won by two players representing the same nation counts as only one win for the nation)
2. A singles > doubles hierarchy
3. Alphabetical order (by family names for players).

To avoid confusion and double counting, these tables should be updated only after all events of the week are completed.

=== Titles won by player ===
2021 Titles won by player

Total	Player	W100		W80		W60		W25		W15		Total	
Total	Player	S	D	S	D	S	D	S	D	S	D	S	D
10	Zhibek Kulambayeva (KAZ)								2	1	7	1	9
9	Cristina Dinu (ROU)							3	1	3	2	6	3
9	Anastasia Zolotareva (RUS)									5	4	5	4
8	Darja Semenistaja (LAT)									7	1	7	1
8	Bai Zhuoxuan (CHN)									5	3	5	3
8	Elina Avanesyan (RUS)					1	1			2	4	3	5
8	Anna Danilina (KAZ)		2				3		3			0	8
7	Panna Udvardy (HUN)					1		4	2			5	2
7	Ylena In-Albon (SUI)							3	1	1	2	4	3
7	Weronika Falkowska (POL)									4	3	4	3
7	Quirine Lemoine (NED)					1	1	1	1	1	2	3	4
7	Olivia Gadecki (AUS)						1	1	2	1	2	2	5
7	Oana Gavrilă (ROU)									1	6	1	6
7	Carolina Alves (BRA)						2		5			0	7
7	Camilla Rosatello (ITA)						2		3		2	0	7
7	Valeriya Strakhova (UKR)						1		6			0	7
7	Ekaterina Reyngold (RUS)							1	1		5	1	6
6	Laura Pigossi (BRA)							2	3	1		3	3
6	Moyuka Uchijima (JPN)							1	2	2	1	3	3
6	Ilona Georgiana Ghioroaie (ROU)									3	3	3	3
6	Jazmín Ortenzi (ARG)									3	3	3	3
6	Jessie Aney (USA)						1			2	3	2	4
6	María Herazo González (COL)								2	2	2	2	4
6	Emina Bektas (USA)					1	1		4			1	5
6	Anna Sisková (CZE)						1	1	2		2	1	5
6	Eudice Chong (HKG)								2	1	3	1	5
6	Erika Sema (JPN)								2	1	3	1	5
6	Jasmijn Gimbrère (NED)								1	1	4	1	5
6	Alicia Barnett (GBR)								3		3	0	6
5	Anhelina Kalinina (UKR)	1				3		1				5	0
5	Nuria Párrizas Díaz (ESP)	1						4				5	0
5	Beatriz Haddad Maia (BRA)					2		3				5	0
5	Anna Bondár (HUN)			1	1	1			2			2	3
5	Nigina Abduraimova (UZB)							1	2	1	1	2	3
5	Jang Su-jeong (KOR)							1	1	1	2	2	3
5	Yuriko Lily Miyazaki (JPN)								2	2	1	2	3
5	Ku Yeon-woo (KOR)								1	2	2	2	3
5	Ma Yexin (CHN)									2	3	2	3
5	Oksana Selekhmeteva (RUS)						2			1	2	1	4
5	Valentini Grammatikopoulou (GRE)						1	1	3			1	4
5	Akvilė Paražinskaitė (LTU)									1	4	1	4
5	Ulrikke Eikeri (NOR)		1						4			0	5
5	Amina Anshba (RUS)						1		4			0	5
5	Caijsa Hennemann (SWE)								3		2	0	5
5	Martyna Kubka (POL)								3		2	0	5
5	Ángela Fita Boluda (ESP)								2		3	0	5
5	Stéphanie Visscher (NED)								2		3	0	5
5	Ksenia Laskutova (RUS)										5	0	5
5	Amarissa Kiara Tóth (HUN)										5	0	5
4	Chloé Paquet (FRA)			1				3				4	0
4	Linda Nosková (CZE)					1		1		2		4	0
4	Dea Herdželaš (BIH)							1		3		4	0
4	Olga Helmi (DEN)									4		4	0
4	Rebeka Masarova (ESP)					1	1	2				3	1
4	Diane Parry (FRA)							3	1			3	1
4	Anna Kubareva (BLR)							1		2	1	3	1
4	Amandine Hesse (FRA)				1			2	1			2	2
4	Andreea Prisăcariu (ROU)						1		1	2		2	2
4	Park So-hyun (KOR)							1	1	1	1	2	2
4	Anastasia Tikhonova (RUS)							1	1	1	1	2	2
4	Elizabeth Mandlik (USA)								2	2		2	2
4	Paige Hourigan (NZL)								1	2	1	2	2
4	Linda Fruhvirtová (CZE)									2	2	2	2
4	Catherine Harrison (USA)				1			1	2			1	3
4	Miriam Kolodziejová (CZE)						1	1	1		1	1	3
4	Maria Timofeeva (RUS)						1			1	2	1	3
4	Justina Mikulskytė (LTU)								2	1	1	1	3
4	Anna Rogers (USA)								1	1	2	1	3
4	Dalayna Hewitt (USA)									1	3	1	3
4	Pia Lovrič (SLO)									1	3	1	3
4	Eliessa Vanlangendonck (BEL)									1	3	1	3
4	Arianne Hartono (NED)						2		2			0	4
4	Momoko Kobori (JPN)						1		1		2	0	4
4	Eva Vedder (NED)								3		1	0	4
4	Adrienn Nagy (HUN)								1		3	0	4
4	Christina Rosca (USA)								1		3	0	4
4	Tiphanie Fiquet (FRA)										4	0	4
4	Lexie Stevens (NED)										4	0	4
4	Cody Wong (HKG)										4	0	4
3	Arantxa Rus (NED)			1		2						3	0
3	Zheng Qinwen (CHN)					1		2				3	0
3	Yuliya Hatouka (BLR)							2		1		3	0
3	Antonia Ružić (CRO)							2		1		3	0
3	Jéssica Bouzas Maneiro (ESP)									3		3	0
3	Ayumi Koshiishi (JPN)									3		3	0
3	Rosa Vicens Mas (ESP)									3		3	0
3	Mirjam Björklund (SWE)							2	1			2	1
3	Katie Swan (GBR)							2	1			2	1
3	Darya Astakhova (RUS)							1		1	1	2	1
3	Lucia Bronzetti (ITA)								1	2		2	1
3	Hurricane Tyra Black (USA)									2	1	2	1
3	Anna Gabric (GER)									2	1	2	1
3	Leyre Romero Gormaz (ESP)									2	1	2	1
3	Himeno Sakatsume (JPN)									2	1	2	1
3	Anastasiya Soboleva (UKR)									2	1	2	1
3	Ekaterine Gorgodze (GEO)				1	1	1					1	2
3	Mariam Bolkvadze (GEO)				1	1			1			1	2
3	Jessika Ponchet (FRA)						2	1				1	2
3	María Lourdes Carlé (ARG)						1	1	1			1	2
3	Sarah Beth Grey (GBR)						1	1	1			1	2
3	Richèl Hogenkamp (NED)						1	1	1			1	2
3	Suzan Lamens (NED)						1	1	1			1	2
3	Jesika Malečková (CZE)						1	1	1			1	2
3	Réka Luca Jani (HUN)							1	2			1	2
3	Lina Glushko (ISR)							1	1		1	1	2
3	Rutuja Bhosale (IND)								1	1	1	1	2
3	Tamara Čurović (SRB)								1	1	1	1	2
3	Sakura Hosogi (JPN)								1	1	1	1	2
3	Shavit Kimchi (ISR)								1	1	1	1	2
3	Daria Mishina (RUS)								1	1	1	1	2
3	Shalimar Talbi (BLR)								1	1	1	1	2
3	Gabriela Cé (BRA)									1	2	1	2
3	Celia Cerviño Ruiz (ESP)									1	2	1	2
3	Melania Delai (ITA)									1	2	1	2
3	Stacey Fung (CAN)									1	2	1	2
3	Nicole Khirin (ISR)									1	2	1	2
3	Elena Malõgina (EST)									1	2	1	2
3	Olga Parres Azcoitia (ESP)									1	2	1	2
3	Chantal Škamlová (SVK)									1	2	1	2
3	Arina Vasilescu (ROU)									1	2	1	2
3	Quinn Gleason (USA)				1		1		1			0	3
3	Andrea Gámiz (VEN)				1				2			0	3
3	Estelle Cascino (FRA)						3					0	3
3	Tereza Mihalíková (SVK)						2		1			0	3
3	Olivia Tjandramulia (AUS)						2		1			0	3
3	Tara Moore (GBR)						1		2			0	3
3	Federica Di Sarra (ITA)								3			0	3
3	Lina Gjorcheska (MKD)								3			0	3
3	Diāna Marcinkēviča (LAT)								3			0	3
3	Kanako Morisaki (JPN)								3			0	3
3	Ioana Loredana Roșca (ROU)								3			0	3
3	Oana Georgeta Simion (ROU)								2		1	0	3
3	Dorka Drahota-Szabó (HUN)								1		2	0	3
3	Jenny Dürst (SUI)								1		2	0	3
3	Ekaterina Makarova (RUS)								1		2	0	3
3	María Paulina Pérez (COL)								1		2	0	3
3	Karola Bejenaru (ROU)										3	0	3
3	Nicole Fossa Huergo (ITA)										3	0	3
3	Ingrid Gamarra Martins (BRA)										3	0	3
3	Isabelle Haverlag (NED)										3	0	3
3	Punnin Kovapitukted (THA)										3	0	3
3	Lee So-ra (KOR)										3	0	3
3	Yasmine Mansouri (FRA)										3	0	3
3	Priska Madelyn Nugroho (INA)										3	0	3
3	Anastasia Pribylova (RUS)										3	0	3
3	Sapfo Sakellaridi (GRE)										3	0	3
3	Anna Ulyashchenko (USA)										3	0	3
2	Claire Liu (USA)	1				1						2	0
2	Daria Snigur (UKR)	1						1				2	0
2	Maryna Zanevska (BEL)			1				1				2	0
2	Clara Burel (FRA)					1		1				2	0
2	Irene Burillo Escorihuela (ESP)					1		1				2	0
2	Harmony Tan (FRA)					1		1				2	0
2	Emiliana Arango (COL)							2				2	0
2	Mai Hontama (JPN)							2				2	0
2	Kaia Kanepi (EST)							2				2	0
2	Nastasja Schunk (GER)							2				2	0
2	Lucrezia Stefanini (ITA)							2				2	0
2	Clara Tauson (DEN)							2				2	0
2	Lamis Alhussein Abdel Aziz (EGY)									2		2	0
2	Salma Djoubri (FRA)									2		2	0
2	Séléna Janicijevic (FRA)									2		2	0
2	Sonay Kartal (GBR)									2		2	0
2	Monika Kilnarová (CZE)									2		2	0
2	Raveena Kingsley (USA)									2		2	0
2	Polina Kudermetova (RUS)									2		2	0
2	Angelica Raggi (ITA)									2		2	0
2	Julia Riera (ARG)									2		2	0
2	Irina Khromacheva (RUS)				1	1						1	1
2	Robin Anderson (USA)				1			1				1	1
2	Usue Maitane Arconada (USA)					1			1			1	1
2	Despina Papamichail (GRE)					1			1			1	1
2	Sára Bejlek (CZE)					1					1	1	1
2	Alina Charaeva (RUS)						1	1				1	1
2	Daniela Vismane (LAT)						1	1				1	1
2	Jodie Burrage (GBR)							1	1			1	1
2	Viktorija Golubic (SUI)							1	1			1	1
2	Valeria Savinykh (RUS)							1	1			1	1
2	Iryna Shymanovich (BLR)							1	1			1	1
2	Yuan Yue (CHN)							1	1			1	1
2	Erika Andreeva (RUS)								1	1		1	1
2	Mana Kawamura (JPN)								1	1		1	1
2	Lee Ya-hsuan (TPE)								1	1		1	1
2	Andreea Roșca (ROU)								1	1		1	1
2	Joanne Züger (SUI)								1	1		1	1
2	Michaela Bayerlová (CZE)									1	1	1	1
2	Lara Escauriza (PAR)									1	1	1	1
2	Ioana Gașpar (ROU)									1	1	1	1
2	Miharu Imanishi (JPN)									1	1	1	1
2	Magali Kempen (BEL)									1	1	1	1
2	Luksika Kumkhum (THA)									1	1	1	1
2	Katarína Kužmová (SVK)									1	1	1	1
2	Vanda Lukács (HUN)									1	1	1	1
2	Martha Matoula (GRE)									1	1	1	1
2	Seone Mendez (AUS)									1	1	1	1
2	Luisa Meyer auf der Heide (GER)									1	1	1	1
2	Pamela Montez (USA)									1	1	1	1
2	Sada Nahimana (BDI)									1	1	1	1
2	Tamira Paszek (AUT)									1	1	1	1
2	Valentina Ryser (SUI)									1	1	1	1
2	Diana Shnaider (RUS)									1	1	1	1
2	Katerina Stewart (USA)									1	1	1	1
2	Rebeka Stolmár (HUN)									1	1	1	1
2	Gergana Topalova (BUL)									1	1	1	1
2	Chanelle Van Nguyen (USA)									1	1	1	1
2	Aldila Sutjiadi (INA)		1				1					0	2
2	Hanna Chang (USA)		1						1			0	2
2	Samantha Murray Sharan (GBR)				1		1					0	2
2	Arina Rodionova (AUS)				1		1					0	2
2	Lara Salden (BEL)				1				1			0	2
2	Marcela Zacarías (MEX)				1				1			0	2
2	Katarzyna Kawa (POL)						2					0	2
2	Sophie Chang (USA)						1		1			0	2
2	Valentina Ivakhnenko (RUS)						1		1			0	2
2	Marie Benoît (BEL)								2			0	2
2	Elysia Bolton (USA)								2			0	2
2	Yvonne Cavallé Reimers (ESP)								2			0	2
2	Kylie Collins (USA)								2			0	2
2	Maegan Manasse (USA)								2			0	2
2	Nika Radišić (SLO)								2			0	2
2	Bibiane Schoofs (NED)								2			0	2
2	Ekaterina Yashina (RUS)								2			0	2
2	Kimberley Zimmermann (BEL)								2			0	2
2	Emily Appleton (GBR)								1		1	0	2
2	Anastasia Dețiuc (CZE)								1		1	0	2
2	Han Na-lae (KOR)								1		1	0	2
2	Katharina Hobgarski (GER)								1		1	0	2
2	Xenia Knoll (SUI)								1		1	0	2
2	Bojana Marinković (SRB)								1		1	0	2
2	Misaki Matsuda (JPN)								1		1	0	2
2	Chiara Scholl (USA)								1		1	0	2
2	Nina Stadler (SUI)								1		1	0	2
2	Amy Zhu (USA)								1		1	0	2
2	Gozal Ainitdinova (KAZ)										2	0	2
2	Natsuho Arakawa (JPN)										2	0	2
2	Back Da-yeon (KOR)										2	0	2
2	Julie Belgraver (FRA)										2	0	2
2	Federica Bilardo (ITA)										2	0	2
2	Victoria Bosio (ARG)										2	0	2
2	Elena-Teodora Cadar (ROU)										2	0	2
2	Eleni Christofi (GRE)										2	0	2
2	Mariana Dražić (CRO)										2	0	2
2	Claudia Hoste Ferrer (ESP)										2	0	2
2	Francisca Jorge (POR)										2	0	2
2	Naïma Karamoko (SUI)										2	0	2
2	Petra Marčinko (CRO)										2	0	2
2	Anna Morgina (RUS)										2	0	2
2	Gabriella Mujan (NED)										2	0	2
2	Anastasia Nefedova (USA)										2	0	2
2	Maggie Ng (HKG)										2	0	2
2	Ni Ma Zhuoma (CHN)										2	0	2
2	Viktoriya Petrenko (UKR)										2	0	2
2	María José Portillo Ramírez (MEX)										2	0	2
2	Aleksandra Pospelova (RUS)										2	0	2
2	Lauren Proctor (USA)										2	0	2
2	Lisa-Marie Rioux (JPN)										2	0	2
2	Alice Robbe (FRA)										2	0	2
2	Sabina Sharipova (UZB)										2	0	2
2	Ayano Shimizu (JPN)										2	0	2
2	Natalia Siedliska (GER)										2	0	2
2	Alana Smith (USA)										2	0	2
2	Natália Szabanin (HUN)										2	0	2
2	Tian Fangran (CHN)										2	0	2
2	Chelsea Vanhoutte (BEL)										2	0	2
2	Ecaterina Visnevscaia (RUS)										2	0	2
2	Radka Zelníčková (SVK)										2	0	2
2	You Mi Zhuoma (CHN)										2	0	2
1	Alison Van Uytvanck (BEL)	1										1	0
1	Katie Volynets (USA)	1										1	0
1	Madison Brengle (USA)			1								1	0
1	Mihaela Buzărnescu (ROU)			1								1	0
1	Misaki Doi (JPN)			1								1	0
1	Martina Trevisan (ITA)			1								1	0
1	Magdalena Fręch (POL)					1						1	0
1	Julia Grabher (AUT)					1						1	0
1	Polona Hercog (SLO)					1						1	0
1	Francesca Jones (GBR)					1						1	0
1	Rebecca Peterson (SWE)					1						1	0
1	Zheng Saisai (CHN)					1						1	0
1	Tessah Andrianjafitrimo (FRA)							1				1	0
1	Susan Bandecchi (SUI)							1				1	0
1	Nefisa Berberović (BIH)							1				1	0
1	Océane Dodin (FRA)							1				1	0
1	Irina Fetecău (ROU)							1				1	0
1	Jaimee Fourlis (AUS)							1				1	0
1	Dalma Gálfi (HUN)							1				1	0
1	Anastasia Grymalska (ITA)							1				1	0
1	María Gutiérrez Carrasco (ESP)							1				1	0
1	Victoria Jiménez Kasintseva (AND)							1				1	0
1	Zoë Kruger (RSA)							1				1	0
1	Danielle Lao (USA)							1				1	0
1	Varvara Lepchenko (USA)							1				1	0
1	Eva Lys (GER)							1				1	0
1	Rebecca Marino (CAN)							1				1	0
1	Yuki Naito (JPN)							1				1	0
1	Emma Navarro (USA)							1				1	0
1	Jule Niemeier (GER)							1				1	0
1	Urszula Radwańska (POL)							1				1	0
1	Ana Sofía Sánchez (MEX)							1				1	0
1	Raluca Șerban (CYP)							1				1	0
1	Peyton Stearns (USA)							1				1	0
1	Lulu Sun (SUI)							1				1	0
1	Tara Würth (CRO)							1				1	0
1	Ayla Aksu (TUR)									1		1	0
1	Marina Bassols Ribera (ESP)									1		1	0
1	Valeria Bhunu (ZIM)									1		1	0
1	Nuria Brancaccio (ITA)									1		1	0
1	Carson Branstine (CAN)									1		1	0
1	Miriam Bulgaru (ROU)									1		1	0
1	Chiara Catini (ITA)									1		1	0
1	Berfu Cengiz (TUR)									1		1	0
1	Anchisa Chanta (THA)									1		1	0
1	Gaëlle Desperrier (FRA)									1		1	0
1	Alex Eala (PHI)									1		1	0
1	Alexa Graham (USA)									1		1	0
1	Alina Granwehr (SUI)									1		1	0
1	Hina Inoue (USA)									1		1	0
1	Léolia Jeanjean (FRA)									1		1	0
1	Kathleen Kanev (GER)									1		1	0
1	Adithya Karunaratne (HKG)									1		1	0
1	Nastja Kolar (SLO)									1		1	0
1	Jana Kolodynska (BLR)									1		1	0
1	Sinja Kraus (AUT)									1		1	0
1	Daria Kudashova (RUS)									1		1	0
1	Anastasia Kulikova (FIN)									1		1	0
1	Michaela Laki (GRE)									1		1	0
1	Polina Leykina (RUS)									1		1	0
1	Li Zongyu (CHN)									1		1	0
1	Julia Middendorf (GER)									1		1	0
1	Angelica Moratelli (ITA)									1		1	0
1	Lena Papadakis (GER)									1		1	0
1	Marine Partaud (FRA)									1		1	0
1	Thaísa Grana Pedretti (BRA)									1		1	0
1	Tatiana Pieri (ITA)									1		1	0
1	Ganna Poznikhirenko (UKR)									1		1	0
1	Adriana Reami (USA)									1		1	0
1	Mell Reasco (ECU)									1		1	0
1	Lena Ruppert (GER)									1		1	0
1	Sabīne Rutlauka (LAT)									1		1	0
1	Sofia Samavati (DEN)									1		1	0
1	Sebastianna Scilipoti (SUI)									1		1	0
1	Alicia Smith (AUS)									1		1	0
1	Tina Nadine Smith (AUS)									1		1	0
1	Johanne Svendsen (DEN)									1		1	0
1	Miriana Tona (ITA)									1		1	0
1	Anna Turati (ITA)									1		1	0
1	Simona Waltert (SUI)									1		1	0
1	Pranjala Yadlapalli (IND)									1		1	0
1	Mei Yamaguchi (JPN)									1		1	0
1	Alexa Glatch (USA)		1									0	1
1	Viktória Kužmová (SVK)		1									0	1
1	Caty McNally (USA)		1									0	1
1	Monica Niculescu (ROU)		1									0	1
1	Erin Routliffe (NZL)		1									0	1
1	Elena-Gabriela Ruse (ROU)		1									0	1
1	Storm Sanders (AUS)		1									0	1
1	Aliona Bolsova (ESP)				1							0	1
1	Ysaline Bonaventure (BEL)				1							0	1
1	Giuliana Olmos (MEX)				1							0	1
1	Anastasia Gasanova (RUS)						1					0	1
1	Bárbara Gatica (CHI)						1					0	1
1	Barbara Haas (AUT)						1					0	1
1	Angela Kulikov (USA)						1					0	1
1	Hiroko Kuwata (JPN)						1					0	1
1	Lu Jiajing (CHN)						1					0	1
1	Lidziya Marozava (BLR)						1					0	1
1	Andreea Mitu (ROU)						1					0	1
1	Rebeca Pereira (BRA)						1					0	1
1	Fanny Stollár (HUN)						1					0	1
1	You Xiaodi (CHN)						1					0	1
1	Destanee Aiava (AUS)								1			0	1
1	Akgul Amanmuradova (UZB)								1			0	1
1	Kamilla Bartone (LAT)								1			0	1
1	Çağla Büyükakçay (TUR)								1			0	1
1	Fernanda Contreras (MEX)								1			0	1
1	Maja Chwalińska (POL)								1			0	1
1	Caroline Dolehide (USA)								1			0	1
1	Jessica Failla (USA)								1			0	1
1	Cristiana Ferrando (ITA)								1			0	1
1	Angelina Gabueva (RUS)								1			0	1
1	Katharina Gerlach (GER)								1			0	1
1	Erina Hayashi (JPN)								1			0	1
1	Anna Hertel (POL)								1			0	1
1	Eri Hozumi (JPN)								1			0	1
1	Hsieh Yu-chieh (TPE)								1			0	1
1	Paula Kania-Choduń (POL)								1			0	1
1	Vania King (USA)								1			0	1
1	Funa Kozaki (JPN)								1			0	1
1	Ashley Lahey (USA)								1			0	1
1	Rasheeda McAdoo (USA)								1			0	1
1	Marina Melnikova (RUS)								1			0	1
1	Robin Montgomery (USA)								1			0	1
1	Chihiro Muramatsu (JPN)								1			0	1
1	Olivia Nicholls (GBR)								1			0	1
1	Lesley Pattinama Kerkhove (NED)								1			0	1
1	Conny Perrin (SUI)								1			0	1
1	Lisa Pigato (ITA)								1			0	1
1	Katherine Sebov (CAN)								1			0	1
1	Daniela Seguel (CHI)								1			0	1
1	Isabella Shinikova (BUL)								1			0	1
1	Eden Silva (GBR)								1			0	1
1	Natalija Stevanović (SRB)								1			0	1
1	Julia Wachaczyk (GER)								1			0	1
1	Emily Webley-Smith (GBR)								1			0	1
1	Margot Yerolymos (FRA)								1			0	1
1	Anastasia Zakharova (RUS)								1			0	1
1	Minami Akiyama (JPN)										1	0	1
1	Fatma Al-Nabhani (OMA)										1	0	1
1	Cemre Anıl (TUR)										1	0	1
1	Emily Arbuthnott (GBR)										1	0	1
1	Ariana Arseneault (CAN)										1	0	1
1	Mana Ayukawa (JPN)										1	0	1
1	Océane Babel (FRA)										1	0	1
1	Sharmada Balu (IND)										1	0	1
1	Yaroslava Bartashevich (RUS)										1	0	1
1	Weronika Baszak (POL)										1	0	1
1	Sowjanya Bavisetti (IND)										1	0	1
1	Sophia Biolay (FRA)										1	0	1
1	Alba Carrillo Marín (ESP)										1	0	1
1	Romina Ccuno (PER)										1	0	1
1	Sravya Shivani Chilakalapudi (IND)										1	0	1
1	Choi Ji-hee (KOR)										1	0	1
1	Martina Colmegna (ITA)										1	0	1
1	Paris Corley (USA)										1	0	1
1	Lucía Cortez Llorca (ESP)										1	0	1
1	Georgia Crăciun (ROU)										1	0	1
1	Petra Csabi (CZE)										1	0	1
1	Tina Cvetkovič (SLO)										1	0	1
1	Mariam Dalakishvili (GEO)										1	0	1
1	Émeline Dartron (FRA)										1	0	1
1	Emma Davis (USA)										1	0	1
1	Viktoriia Dema (UKR)										1	0	1
1	Katerina Dimitrova (BUL)										1	0	1
1	Kristina Dmitruk (BLR)										1	0	1
1	Başak Eraydın (TUR)										1	0	1
1	Vanessa Ersöz (SWE)										1	0	1
1	Aliona Falei (BLR)										1	0	1
1	Virginia Ferrara (ITA)										1	0	1
1	Fiona Ganz (SUI)										1	0	1
1	Emmanuelle Girard (FRA)										1	0	1
1	Katharina Hering (GER)										1	0	1
1	Sina Herrmann (GER)										1	0	1
1	Alicia Herrero Liñana (ESP)										1	0	1
1	Merel Hoedt (NED)										1	0	1
1	Zoe Howard (USA)										1	0	1
1	Inès Ibbou (ALG)										1	0	1
1	Anzhelika Isaeva (RUS)										1	0	1
1	Dasha Ivanova (USA)										1	0	1
1	Jeong Yeong-won (KOR)										1	0	1
1	Lauryn John-Baptiste (GBR)										1	0	1
1	Matilde Jorge (POR)										1	0	1
1	Ekaterina Kazionova (RUS)										1	0	1
1	Kim Da-bin (KOR)										1	0	1
1	Julia Kimmelmann (GER)										1	0	1
1	Melanie Klaffner (AUT)										1	0	1
1	Anna Klasen (GER)										1	0	1
1	Júlia Klimovicz (BRA)										1	0	1
1	Katarina Kozarov (SRB)										1	0	1
1	Melany Solange Krywoj (ARG)										1	0	1
1	Miho Kuramochi (JPN)										1	0	1
1	Aneta Laboutková (CZE)										1	0	1
1	Fernanda Labraña (CHI)										1	0	1
1	Kristýna Lavičková (CZE)										1	0	1
1	Liang En-shuo (TPE)										1	0	1
1	Yuliana Lizarazo (COL)										1	0	1
1	Sabastiani León (USA)										1	0	1
1	Ekaterina Maklakova (RUS)										1	0	1
1	Marie Mettraux (SUI)										1	0	1
1	Elena Milovanović (SRB)										1	0	1
1	Viktória Morvayová (SVK)										1	0	1
1	Juliana Munhoz (BRA)										1	0	1
1	Inês Murta (POR)										1	0	1
1	Ramya Natarajan (IND)										1	0	1
1	Taylor Ng (USA)										1	0	1
1	Lucie Nguyen Tan (FRA)										1	0	1
1	Haine Ogata (JPN)										1	0	1
1	Kyōka Okamura (JPN)										1	0	1
1	Oona Orpana (FIN)										1	0	1
1	Alexandra Osborne (AUS)										1	0	1
1	İpek Öz (TUR)										1	0	1
1	Dimitra Pavlou (GRE)										1	0	1
1	Georgia Pedone (ITA)										1	0	1
1	Giorgia Pinto (ITA)										1	0	1
1	Anna Popescu (GBR)										1	0	1
1	Phillippa Preugschat (GER)										1	0	1
1	Laetitia Pulchartová (CZE)										1	0	1
1	Lexington Reed (USA)										1	0	1
1	Kajsa Rinaldo Persson (SWE)										1	0	1
1	Victoria Rodríguez (MEX)										1	0	1
1	Federica Rossi (ITA)										1	0	1
1	Margaux Rouvroy (FRA)										1	0	1
1	Rina Saigo (JPN)										1	0	1
1	Yukina Saigo (JPN)										1	0	1
1	Sathwika Sama (IND)										1	0	1
1	Sandra Samir (EGY)										1	0	1
1	Naho Sato (JPN)										1	0	1
1	Emily Seibold (GER)										1	0	1
1	Gaia Squarcialupi (ITA)										1	0	1
1	Anastasia Sukhotina (RUS)										1	0	1
1	Anastasia Sysoeva (RUS)										1	0	1
1	Léa Tholey (FRA)										1	0	1
1	María Camila Torres Murcia (COL)										1	0	1
1	Demi Tran (NED)										1	0	1
1	Lian Tran (NED)										1	0	1
1	Doğa Türkmen (TUR)										1	0	1
1	Federica Urgesi (ITA)										1	0	1
1	Denise Valente (ITA)										1	0	1
1	Darja Viďmanová (CZE)										1	0	1
1	Karolína Vlčková (CZE)										1	0	1
1	Rushri Wijesundera (USA)										1	0	1
1	Yao Xinxin (CHN)										1	0	1
1	Noelia Zeballos (BOL)										1	0	1
1	Martina Zerulo (ITA)										1	0	1

=== Titles won by nation ===
2021 Titles won by nation

Total	Nation	W100		W80		W60		W25		W15		Total	
Total	Nation	S	D	S	D	S	D	S	D	S	D	S	D
81	Russia (RUS)				1	2	5	5	15	18	35	25	56
77	United States (USA)	2	2	1	2	3	4	7	17	16	23	29	48
49	Japan (JPN)			1			1	4	12	14	17	19	30
44	France (FRA)			1	1	2	4	13	2	7	14	23	21
44	Romania (ROU)		1	1			2	4	7	13	16	18	26
39	Netherlands (NED)			1		3	4	3	9	2	17	9	30
38	Italy (ITA)			1			2	3	6	11	15	15	23
36	Spain (ESP)	1			1	2	1	8	2	11	10	22	14
34	Hungary (HUN)			1	1	2	1	6	8	2	13	11	23
30	Czech Republic (CZE)					2	2	4	4	7	11	13	17
28	Great Britain (GBR)				1	1	3	4	11	2	6	7	21
27	Brazil (BRA)					2	3	5	8	3	6	10	17
26	China (CHN)					2	1	3	1	8	11	13	13
25	Switzerland (SUI)							6	5	6	8	12	13
23	Germany (GER)							4	3	7	9	11	12
21	Ukraine (UKR)	2				3	1	2	6	3	4	10	11
21	South Korea (KOR)							2	4	4	11	6	15
19	Australia (AUS)		1		1		4	2	3	4	4	6	13
19	Poland (POL)					1	1	1	6	4	6	6	13
19	Kazakhstan (KAZ)		2				3		5	1	8	1	18
16	Belarus (BLR)						1	4	2	5	4	9	7
16	Belgium (BEL)	1		1	2			1	4	2	5	5	11
15	Latvia (LAT)						1	1	4	8	1	9	6
14	Argentina (ARG)						1	1	1	5	6	6	8
14	Greece (GRE)					1	1	1	4	2	5	4	10
11	Slovakia (SVK)		1				2		1	2	5	2	9
10	Colombia (COL)							2	2	2	4	4	6
10	Sweden (SWE)					1		2	4		3	3	7
10	Hong Kong (HKG)								2	2	6	2	8
9	Slovenia (SLO)					1			2	2	4	3	6
9	Lithuania (LTU)								2	2	5	2	7
8	Denmark (DEN)							2		6		8	0
8	Croatia (CRO)							3		1	4	4	4
8	Israel (ISR)							1	1	2	4	3	5
8	Uzbekistan (UZB)							1	3	1	3	2	6
8	Serbia (SRB)								3	1	4	1	7
7	Georgia (GEO)				2	2	1		1		1	2	5
6	Austria (AUT)					1			1	2	2	3	3
6	Canada (CAN)							1	1	2	2	3	3
6	India (IND)								1	2	3	2	4
6	Turkey (TUR)								1	2	3	2	4
6	Thailand (THA)									2	4	2	4
5	Bosnia and Herzegovina (BIH)							2		3		5	0
5	Estonia (EST)							2		1	2	3	2
5	New Zealand (NZL)		1						1	2	1	2	3
5	Mexico (MEX)				1			1	1		2	1	4
5	Indonesia (INA)		1				1				3	0	5
5	Norway (NOR)		1						4			0	5
4	Chinese Taipei (TPE)								2	1	1	1	3
4	Bulgaria (BUL)								1	1	2	1	3
4	Portugal (POR)										4	0	4
3	Egypt (EGY)									2	1	2	1
3	Venezuela (VEN)				1				2			0	3
3	Chile (CHI)						1		1		1	0	3
3	North Macedonia (MKD)								3			0	3
2	Burundi (BDI)									1	1	1	1
2	Finland (FIN)									1	1	1	1
2	Paraguay (PAR)									1	1	1	1
1	Andorra (AND)							1				1	0
1	Cyprus (CYP)							1				1	0
1	South Africa (RSA)							1				1	0
1	Ecuador (ECU)									1		1	0
1	Philippines (PHI)									1		1	0
1	Zimbabwe (ZIM)									1		1	0
1	Algeria (ALG)										1	0	1
1	Bolivia (BOL)										1	0	1
1	Oman (OMA)										1	0	1
1	Peru (PER)										1	0	1

== Retirements ==
Following is a list of notable players who announced their retirement from professional tennis, became inactive (after not playing for more than 52 weeks), or were permanently banned from playing, during the 2021 season:

- (Italy) Georgia Brescia
- (Paraguay) Montserrat González
- (Germany) Romy Kölzer
- (Japan) Mari Osaka
- (Sweden) Marina Yudanov

== See also ==
- 2021 WTA Tour
- 2021 WTA 125K series
- 2021 ATP Challenger Tour
- 2021 ITF Men's World Tennis Tour
