= 2021 ITF Men's World Tennis Tour =

International tennis tournament series

Details
- Duration: 4 January 2021 – 2 January 2022
- Edition: 24th
- Tournaments: 386
- Categories: M25 tournaments (108); M15 tournaments (278)

Achievements (singles)
- Most titles: (Italy) Franco Agamenone (United Kingdom) Paul Jubb (Sweden) Dragoș Nicolae Mădăraș (Austria) Filip Misolic (5)
- Most finals: (Italy) Franco Agamenone (9)

The 2021 International Tennis Federation (ITF) Men's World Tennis Tour is an entry-level tour for Men's professional tennis. It is organized by the International Tennis Federation and is a tier below the ATP Challenger Tour. The Men's ITF World Tennis Tour includes tournaments with prize money ranging from $15,000 to $25,000. The results of ITF tournaments are incorporated into the ATP ranking, which enables professionals to progress to the ATP Challenger Tour and ATP Tour, and ultimately the Grand Slams.

The Tour offers approximately 550 tournaments across 70 countries and incorporates two prize money levels of tournaments: $15,000 and $25,000.

Tournaments at $15,000 level include reserved main draw places for Top 100-ranked ITF World Tennis Tour Juniors, providing a smooth pathway for young talent to break through into elite professional tennis.

== Participating host nations ==
- Argentina (ARG)
- Austria (AUT)
- Belgium (BEL)
- Bolivia (BOL)
- Bosnia and Herzegovina (BIH)
- Brazil (BRA)
- Bulgaria (BUL)
- Colombia (COL)
- Croatia (CRO)
- Czech Republic (CZE)
- Denmark (DEN)
- Dominican Republic (DOM)
- Ecuador (ECU)
- Egypt (EGY)
- Estonia (EST)
- Finland (FIN)
- France (FRA)
- Georgia (GEO)
- Germany (GER)
- Greece (GRE)
- Guatemala (GUA)
- Hungary (HUN)
- India (IND)
- Israel (ISR)
- Italy (ITA)
- Kazakhstan (KAZ)
- Luxembourg (LUX)
- Mexico (MEX)
- Montenegro (MNE)
- Netherlands (NED)
- North Macedonia (MKD)
- Paraguay (PAR)
- Peru (PER)
- Poland (POL)
- Portugal (POR)
- Qatar (QAT)
- Romania (ROU)
- Russia (RUS)
- Serbia (SRB)
- Slovakia (SVK)
- Slovenia (SLO)
- South Africa (RSA)
- Spain (ESP)
- Sweden (SWE)
- Switzerland (SUI)
- Tunisia (TUN)
- Turkey (TUR)
- Ukraine (UKR)
- United States (USA)

== Tournament breakdown by event category ==
Event category	Number of events	Total prize money
$25,000	108	$2,700,000
$15,000	278	$4,170,000
Total	386	$6,870,000

== Ranking points distribution ==
Category	W	F	SF	QF	R16	R32	Q	Q2	Q1
↓ ATP Ranking Points ↓
M25+H (S) / M25 (S)	20	12	6	3	1	–	–	–	–
M25+H (D) / M25 (D)	20	12	6	3	–	–	–	–	–
M15+H (S) / M15 (S)	10	6	4	2	1	–	–	–	–
M15+H (D) / M15 (D)	10	6	4	2	–	–	–	–	–
↓ ITF World Tennis Ranking Points ↓
M25+H (S)	–	–	–	–	–	–	4	1	–
M25 (S)	–	–	–	–	–	–	3	1	–
M15+H (S)	–	–	–	–	–	–	3	1	–
M15 (S)	–	–	–	–	–	–	2	1	–

- "+H" indicates that hospitality is provided.

== Prize money distribution ==
Category	W	F	SF	QF	R16	R32
M25+H (S) / M25 (S)	$3,600	$2,120	$1,255	$730	$430	$260
M25+H (D) / M25 (D)	$1,550	$900	$540	$320	$180	–
M15+H (S) / M15 (S)	$2,160	$1,272	$753	$438	$258	$156
M15+H (D) / M15 (D)	$930	$540	$324	$192	$108	–

- Doubles prize money per team

== Statistics ==
These tables present the number of singles (S) and doubles (D) titles won by each player and each nation during the season. The players/nations are sorted by:

1. Total number of titles (a doubles title won by two players representing the same nation counts as only one win for the nation)
2. A singles > doubles hierarchy
3. Alphabetical order (by family names for players).

To avoid confusion and double counting, these tables should be updated only after all events of the week are completed.

=== Titles won by player ===
2021 Titles won by player

Total	Player	M25		M15		Total	
Total	Player	S	D	S	D	S	D
11	Franco Agamenone (ITA)	2	3	3	3	5	6
9	Dan Added (FRA)	1	4	2	2	3	6
9	Jeremy Beale (AUS)		1	1	7	1	8
9	Neil Oberleitner (AUT)		2		7	0	9
8	Hsu Yu-hsiou (TPE)			4	4	4	4
8	Thomas Fancutt (AUS)		1		7	0	8
7	Billy Harris (GBR)			4	3	4	3
7	Jakub Paul (SUI)	2	4		1	2	5
7	Carlos Sánchez Jover (ESP)		1	2	4	2	5
7	Oscar José Gutierrez (BRA)	1	5		1	1	6
7	Yan Bondarevskiy (RUS)		2	1	4	1	6
7	Grigoriy Lomakin (KAZ)				7	0	7
6	Dragoș Nicolae Mădăraș (SWE)			5	1	5	1
6	Li Tu (AUS)	1		3	2	4	2
6	José Francisco Vidal Azorín (ESP)			4	2	4	2
6	Eric Vanshelboim (UKR)		1	3	2	3	3
6	Gilbert Klier Júnior (BRA)	1	2	1	2	2	4
6	Santiago Rodríguez Taverna (ARG)	1		1	4	2	4
6	Leandro Riedi (SUI)		4	1	1	1	5
6	Andrew Paulson (CZE)		3	1	2	1	5
6	Sanjar Fayziev (UZB)		2		4	0	6
6	Arthur Bouquier (FRA)		1		5	0	6
6	Alexander Cozbinov (MDA)		1		5	0	6
6	Ajeet Rai (NZL)				6	0	6
5	Paul Jubb (GBR)	3		2		5	0
5	Filip Misolic (AUT)	1		4		5	0
5	Rinky Hijikata (AUS)	2	1	2		4	1
5	Nick Hardt (DOM)	2		2	1	4	1
5	Máté Valkusz (HUN)	2		2	1	4	1
5	Guy den Ouden (NED)		1	4		4	1
5	Marek Gengel (CZE)			4	1	4	1
5	Nicolas Moreno de Alboran (USA)	2	1	1	1	3	2
5	Gustavo Heide (BRA)		1	3	1	3	2
5	Daniel Michalski (POL)			3	2	3	2
5	Damien Wenger (SUI)			3	2	3	2
5	Alexander Erler (AUT)	1	1	1	2	2	3
5	Luciano Darderi (ITA)		1	2	2	2	3
5	Skander Mansouri (TUN)		1	2	2	2	3
5	Charles Broom (GBR)			2	3	2	3
5	Gergely Madarász (HUN)			2	3	2	3
5	Francesco Passaro (ITA)			2	3	2	3
5	Gijs Brouwer (NED)	1	1		3	1	4
5	Shintaro Imai (JPN)	1			4	1	4
5	Martin Damm (USA)		1	1	3	1	4
5	Orlando Luz (BRA)		1	1	3	1	4
5	Oleg Prihodko (UKR)		1	1	3	1	4
5	Leonardo Aboian (ARG)			1	4	1	4
5	Johannes Ingildsen (DEN)			1	4	1	4
5	Luke Johnson (GBR)			1	4	1	4
5	Alejo Lorenzo Lingua Lavallén (ARG)			1	4	1	4
5	Juan Pablo Paz (ARG)			1	4	1	4
5	Petros Tsitsipas (GRE)		4		1	0	5
5	Piotr Matuszewski (POL)		3		2	0	5
5	Niklas Schell (GER)		3		2	0	5
5	Yannik Steinegger (SUI)		3		2	0	5
5	Markos Kalovelonis (GRE)		2		3	0	5
5	Reese Stalder (USA)		2		3	0	5
4	Nicolás Kicker (ARG)	3		1		4	0
4	Gonzalo Lama (CHI)			4		4	0
4	Antoine Escoffier (FRA)	3	1			3	1
4	Fábián Marozsán (HUN)			3	1	3	1
4	Stuart Parker (GBR)			3	1	3	1
4	Alastair Gray (GBR)	2	2			2	2
4	Peter Heller (GER)	1	1	1	1	2	2
4	Román Andrés Burruchaga (ARG)	1		1	2	2	2
4	Pedro Cachin (ARG)	1		1	2	2	2
4	Chung Yun-seong (KOR)			2	2	2	2
4	Liam Draxl (CAN)			2	2	2	2
4	Hong Seong-chan (KOR)			2	2	2	2
4	Timo Stodder (GER)			2	2	2	2
4	Daniel Dutra da Silva (BRA)	1	2		1	1	3
4	Cristian Rodríguez (COL)	1	2		1	1	3
4	Moez Echargui (TUN)		2	1	1	1	3
4	Gabriel Alejandro Hidalgo (ARG)		2	1	1	1	3
4	Patrik Rikl (CZE)		1	1	2	1	3
4	Raúl Brancaccio (ITA)			1	3	1	3
4	Evan Hoyt (GBR)		3		1	0	4
4	Blake Ellis (AUS)		2		2	0	4
4	Markus Eriksson (SWE)		2		2	0	4
4	Filip Bergevi (SWE)		1		3	0	4
4	Gabriel Roveri Sidney (BRA)		1		3	0	4
4	Kai Wehnelt (GER)		1		3	0	4
4	Julian Cash (GBR)				4	0	4
4	Cezar Crețu (ROU)				4	0	4
4	Marat Deviatiarov (UKR)				4	0	4
4	Juan Ignacio Galarza (ARG)				4	0	4
4	Saketh Myneni (IND)				4	0	4
4	Miguel Fernando Pereira (CHI)				4	0	4
4	Constantin Schmitz (GER)				4	0	4
4	Yaraslav Shyla (BLR)				4	0	4
3	Zsombor Piros (HUN)	2		1		3	0
3	Alibek Kachmazov (RUS)	1		2		3	0
3	Ergi Kırkın (TUR)	1		2		3	0
3	Álvaro López San Martín (ESP)	1		2		3	0
3	Matheus Pucinelli de Almeida (BRA)	1		2		3	0
3	Yankı Erel (TUR)			3		3	0
3	Hady Habib (LBN)			3		3	0
3	Zane Khan (USA)			3		3	0
3	Lý Hoàng Nam (VIE)			3		3	0
3	Bastián Malla (CHI)			3		3	0
3	Shang Juncheng (CHN)			3		3	0
3	Renta Tokuda (JPN)			3		3	0
3	Miljan Zekić (SRB)			3		3	0
3	Manuel Guinard (FRA)	2	1			2	1
3	Matteo Martineau (FRA)	2			1	2	1
3	Facundo Juárez (ARG)	1	1	1		2	1
3	Jiří Lehečka (CZE)	1	1	1		2	1
3	Hernán Casanova (ARG)	1		1	1	2	1
3	Naoki Nakagawa (JPN)	1		1	1	2	1
3	Luca Nardi (ITA)	1		1	1	2	1
3	Aziz Dougaz (TUN)			2	1	2	1
3	Giovanni Fonio (ITA)			2	1	2	1
3	Ivan Gakhov (RUS)			2	1	2	1
3	Sebastian Fanselow (GER)	1	2			1	2
3	Giovanni Mpetshi Perricard (FRA)	1	2			1	2
3	Tristan Schoolkate (AUS)	1	2			1	2
3	Khumoyun Sultanov (UZB)	1	2			1	2
3	Arklon Huertas del Pino (PER)	1	1		1	1	2
3	Toby Kodat (USA)		1	1	1	1	2
3	Mattia Bellucci (ITA)			1	2	1	2
3	Martin Breysach (FRA)			1	2	1	2
3	Vasil Kirkov (USA)			1	2	1	2
3	Mateo Nicolás Martínez (ARG)			1	2	1	2
3	Henry Patten (GBR)			1	2	1	2
3	Luca Potenza (ITA)			1	2	1	2
3	Alexander Weis (ITA)			1	2	1	2
3	Matías Zukas (ARG)			1	2	1	2
3	Mateus Alves (BRA)		3			0	3
3	Fabian Fallert (GER)		3			0	3
3	Luis Patiño (MEX)		3			0	3
3	Murkel Dellien (BOL)		2		1	0	3
3	Alexander Donski (BUL)		2		1	0	3
3	Conner Huertas del Pino (PER)		2		1	0	3
3	Igor Marcondes (BRA)		2		1	0	3
3	João Lucas Reis da Silva (BRA)		2		1	0	3
3	Théo Arribagé (FRA)		1		2	0	3
3	Victor Vlad Cornea (ROU)		1		2	0	3
3	Arjun Kadhe (IND)		1		2	0	3
3	Benjamin Lock (ZIM)		1		2	0	3
3	Carlos López Montagud (ESP)		1		2	0	3
3	Péter Nagy (HUN)		1		2	0	3
3	Alfredo Perez (USA)		1		2	0	3
3	David Pichler (AUT)		1		2	0	3
3	Arthur Reymond (FRA)		1		2	0	3
3	Mark Whitehouse (GBR)		1		2	0	3
3	Valerio Aboian (ARG)				3	0	3
3	Jacopo Berrettini (ITA)				3	0	3
3	Daniele Capecchi (ITA)				3	0	3
3	Ignacio Carou (URU)				3	0	3
3	Simon Freund (SWE)				3	0	3
3	Anis Ghorbel (TUN)				3	0	3
3	Max Houkes (NED)				3	0	3
3	Mircea-Alexandru Jecan (ROU)				3	0	3
3	Ben Jones (GBR)				3	0	3
3	Ivan Liutarevich (BLR)				3	0	3
3	Ryan Nijboer (NED)				3	0	3
3	Alex Rybakov (USA)				3	0	3
3	Christian Sigsgaard (DEN)				3	0	3
3	Fermín Tenti (ARG)				3	0	3
3	Francesco Vilardo (ITA)				3	0	3
3	Yann Wójcik (POL)				3	0	3
2	Matteo Arnaldi (ITA)	2				2	0
2	Javier Barranco Cosano (ESP)	2				2	0
2	Arthur Cazaux (FRA)	2				2	0
2	Viktor Durasovic (NOR)	2				2	0
2	Yshai Oliel (ISR)	2				2	0
2	Kaichi Uchida (JPN)	2				2	0
2	Evan Furness (FRA)	1		1		2	0
2	Alexander Shevchenko (RUS)	1		1		2	0
2	Otto Virtanen (FIN)	1		1		2	0
2	Federico Arnaboldi (ITA)			2		2	0
2	Moerani Bouzige (AUS)			2		2	0
2	Lucas Catarina (MON)			2		2	0
2	Oliver Crawford (USA)			2		2	0
2	Eliakim Coulibaly (CIV)			2		2	0
2	Alexis Gautier (FRA)			2		2	0
2	Omni Kumar (USA)			2		2	0
2	Christian Langmo (USA)			2		2	0
2	Edoardo Lavagno (ITA)			2		2	0
2	Gauthier Onclin (BEL)			2		2	0
2	Ben Patael (ISR)			2		2	0
2	Ryan Peniston (GBR)			2		2	0
2	Jack Pinnington Jones (GBR)			2		2	0
2	Lucas Poullain (FRA)			2		2	0
2	Aldin Šetkić (BIH)			2		2	0
2	Juan Bautista Torres (ARG)			2		2	0
2	Valentin Vacherot (FRA)			2		2	0
2	Facundo Díaz Acosta (ARG)	1	1			1	1
2	Jelle Sels (NED)	1	1			1	1
2	Ben Shelton (USA)	1	1			1	1
2	Eliot Spizzirri (USA)	1	1			1	1
2	Clément Tabur (FRA)	1	1			1	1
2	Tseng Chun-hsin (TPE)	1	1			1	1
2	Pedro Boscardin Dias (BRA)	1			1	1	1
2	Francisco Comesaña (ARG)	1			1	1	1
2	Tim Handel (GER)	1			1	1	1
2	John McNally (USA)	1			1	1	1
2	Rio Noguchi (JPN)	1			1	1	1
2	Corentin Denolly (FRA)		1	1		1	1
2	Yannick Mertens (BEL)		1	1		1	1
2	David Poljak (CZE)		1	1		1	1
2	Raymond Sarmiento (USA)		1	1		1	1
2	Ryan James Storrie (GBR)		1	1		1	1
2	Rémy Bertola (SUI)			1	1	1	1
2	Nuno Borges (POR)			1	1	1	1
2	Petros Chrysochos (CYP)			1	1	1	1
2	Michał Dembek (POL)			1	1	1	1
2	Péter Fajta (HUN)			1	1	1	1
2	Nicolae Frunză (ROU)			1	1	1	1
2	Guy Orly Iradukunda (BDI)			1	1	1	1
2	Niki Kaliyanda Poonacha (IND)			1	1	1	1
2	Oleksii Krutykh (UKR)			1	1	1	1
2	Li Hanwen (CHN)			1	1	1	1
2	Yuki Mochizuki (JPN)			1	1	1	1
2	Ștefan Paloși (ROU)			1	1	1	1
2	Colin Sinclair (NMI)			1	1	1	1
2	Jeroen Vanneste (BEL)			1	1	1	1
2	Zsombor Velcz (HUN)			1	1	1	1
2	Agustín Velotti (ARG)			1	1	1	1
2	Francis Alcantara (PHI)		2			0	2
2	Jesper de Jong (NED)		2			0	2
2	Franco Emanuel Egea (ARG)		2			0	2
2	Alejandro Gómez (COL)		2			0	2
2	Diego Hidalgo (ECU)		2			0	2
2	Arthur Fils (FRA)		2			0	2
2	Hendrik Jebens (GER)		2			0	2
2	Maximilian Neuchrist (AUT)		2			0	2
2	Jorge Panta (PER)		2			0	2
2	Mārtiņš Podžus (LAT)		2			0	2
2	Yuta Shimizu (JPN)		2			0	2
2	Domagoj Bilješko (CRO)		1		1	0	2
2	Francisco Cabral (POR)		1		1	0	2
2	Felix Corwin (USA)		1		1	0	2
2	Daniel Cukierman (ISR)		1		1	0	2
2	Gonçalo Falcão (POR)		1		1	0	2
2	Shintaro Mochizuki (JPN)		1		1	0	2
2	Adam Pavlásek (CZE)		1		1	0	2
2	Duarte Vale (POR)		1		1	0	2
2	Eero Vasa (FIN)		1		1	0	2
2	Iiro Vasa (FIN)		1		1	0	2
2	Mick Veldheer (NED)		1		1	0	2
2	Boris Arias (BOL)				2	0	2
2	Siddhant Banthia (IND)				2	0	2
2	Alberto Barroso Campos (ESP)				2	0	2
2	Yuki Bhambri (IND)				2	0	2
2	Marco Bortolotti (ITA)				2	0	2
2	Bu Yunchaokete (CHN)				2	0	2
2	Luca Castelnuovo (SUI)				2	0	2
2	Loïc Cloes (BEL)				2	0	2
2	Jonathan Gray (GBR)				2	0	2
2	Ray Ho (TPE)				2	0	2
2	Ondřej Horák (CZE)				2	0	2
2	Jarno Jans (NED)				2	0	2
2	Tom Jomby (FRA)				2	0	2
2	Mariano Kestelboim (ARG)				2	0	2
2	Elgin Khoeblal (NED)				2	0	2
2	Chad Kissell (USA)				2	0	2
2	Daniel Little (GBR)				2	0	2
2	Louroi Martinez (SUI)				2	0	2
2	Mirko Martinez (SUI)				2	0	2
2	Ignacio Monzón (ARG)				2	0	2
2	Nam Ji-sung (KOR)				2	0	2
2	Mariano Navone (ARG)				2	0	2
2	Hazem Naw (SYR)				2	0	2
2	Lukas Neumayer (AUT)				2	0	2
2	Aziz Ouakaa (TUN)				2	0	2
2	Tadeáš Paroulek (CZE)				2	0	2
2	Brandon Pérez (VEN)				2	0	2
2	Matthew Romios (AUS)				2	0	2
2	Luca Sanchez (FRA)				2	0	2
2	Joshua Sheehy (USA)				2	0	2
2	Volodymyr Uzhylovskyi (UKR)				2	0	2
2	Samuel Vincent Ruggeri (ITA)				2	0	2
2	Seita Watanabe (JPN)				2	0	2
1	Nicolás Álvarez Varona (ESP)	1				1	0
1	Alen Avidzba (RUS)	1				1	0
1	Clément Chidekh (FRA)	1				1	0
1	Joris De Loore (BEL)	1				1	0
1	Gastão Elias (POR)	1				1	0
1	Eduard Esteve Lobato (ESP)	1				1	0
1	Carlos Gimeno Valero (ESP)	1				1	0
1	Hugo Grenier (FRA)	1				1	0
1	Christian Harrison (USA)	1				1	0
1	Calvin Hemery (FRA)	1				1	0
1	Evgeny Karlovskiy (RUS)	1				1	0
1	Alexandar Lazarov (BUL)	1				1	0
1	Aidan McHugh (GBR)	1				1	0
1	Alejandro Moro Cañas (ESP)	1				1	0
1	Govind Nanda (USA)	1				1	0
1	Filip Peliwo (CAN)	1				1	0
1	Matthieu Perchicot (FRA)	1				1	0
1	Oriol Roca Batalla (ESP)	1				1	0
1	Nikolás Sánchez Izquierdo (ESP)	1				1	0
1	Zachary Svajda (USA)	1				1	0
1	Dalibor Svrčina (CZE)	1				1	0
1	Tim van Rijthoven (NED)	1				1	0
1	Louis Wessels (GER)	1				1	0
1	Adrian Andreev (BUL)			1		1	0
1	Jaimee Floyd Angele (FRA)			1		1	0
1	Pierre Yves Bailly (BEL)			1		1	0
1	Andrea Basso (ITA)			1		1	0
1	Antoine Bellier (SUI)			1		1	0
1	Illya Beloborodko (UKR)			1		1	0
1	Peter Bertran (DOM)			1		1	0
1	Ugo Blanchet (FRA)			1		1	0
1	Bogdan Bobrov (RUS)			1		1	0
1	Flavio Cobolli (ITA)			1		1	0
1	Daniel Cox (GBR)			1		1	0
1	Rrezart Cungu (MNE)			1		1	0
1	Santiago de la Fuente (ARG)			1		1	0
1	Gabriel Décamps (BRA)			1		1	0
1	Alec Deckers (NED)			1		1	0
1	Matías Franco Descotte (ARG)			1		1	0
1	John Echeverría (ESP)			1		1	0
1	Elmar Ejupovic (GER)			1		1	0
1	Tomás Farjat (ARG)			1		1	0
1	Felix Gill (GBR)			1		1	0
1	Ryan Harrison (USA)			1		1	0
1	Christopher Heyman (BEL)			1		1	0
1	Giles Hussey (GBR)			1		1	0
1	Kyrian Jacquet (FRA)			1		1	0
1	Filip Jianu (ROU)			1		1	0
1	Jason Kubler (AUS)			1		1	0
1	Patrick Kypson (USA)			1		1	0
1	Timo Legout (FRA)			1		1	0
1	Pablo Llamas Ruiz (ESP)			1		1	0
1	Francesco Maestrelli (ITA)			1		1	0
1	Àlex Martí Pujolràs (ESP)			1		1	0
1	Anton Matusevich (GBR)			1		1	0
1	Daniel Mérida Aguilar (ESP)			1		1	0
1	Lucas Miedler (AUT)			1		1	0
1	Oscar Moraing (GER)			1		1	0
1	Jonathan Mridha (SWE)			1		1	0
1	Emilio Nava (USA)			1		1	0
1	Ivan Nedelko (RUS)			1		1	0
1	Christoph Negritu (GER)			1		1	0
1	Johan Nikles (SUI)			1		1	0
1	Fabrizio Ornago (ITA)			1		1	0
1	Dominik Palán (CZE)			1		1	0
1	Luka Pavlovic (FRA)			1		1	0
1	Alessandro Ragazzi (ITA)			1		1	0
1	Maciej Rajski (POL)			1		1	0
1	Simone Roncalli (ITA)			1		1	0
1	Mats Rosenkranz (GER)			1		1	0
1	Holger Rune (DEN)			1		1	0
1	Vitaliy Sachko (UKR)			1		1	0
1	Kyle Seelig (USA)			1		1	0
1	Keegan Smith (USA)			1		1	0
1	Manish Sureshkumar (IND)			1		1	0
1	Evgenii Tiurnev (RUS)			1		1	0
1	Michel Vernier (CHI)			1		1	0
1	Nicolás Acevedo (CHI)		1			0	1
1	Tuna Altuna (TUR)		1			0	1
1	JC Aragone (USA)		1			0	1
1	Nicolás Barrientos (COL)		1			0	1
1	Alec Beckley (RSA)		1			0	1
1	Alessandro Bega (ITA)		1			0	1
1	Antonín Bolardt (CZE)		1			0	1
1	Martin Borisiouk (BLR)		1			0	1
1	Gábor Borsos (HUN)		1			0	1
1	Adrien Burdet (SUI)		1			0	1
1	Simon Carr (IRL)		1			0	1
1	Nick Chappell (USA)		1			0	1
1	Daniel de Jonge (NED)		1			0	1
1	Kenny de Schepper (FRA)		1			0	1
1	Niels Desein (BEL)		1			0	1
1	Quentin Folliot (FRA)		1			0	1
1	Lior Goldenberg (ISR)		1			0	1
1	Mats Hermans (NED)		1			0	1
1	Vaughn Hunter (RSA)		1			0	1
1	Hunter Johnson (USA)		1			0	1
1	Yates Johnson (USA)		1			0	1
1	Sander Jong (NED)		1			0	1
1	Miloš Karol (SVK)		1			0	1
1	Strong Kirchheimer (USA)		1			0	1
1	Andrey Kuznetsov (RUS)		1			0	1
1	Aliaksandr Liaonenka (BLR)		1			0	1
1	Harold Mayot (FRA)		1			0	1
1	Iñaki Montes de la Torre (ESP)		1			0	1
1	Alessandro Motti (ITA)		1			0	1
1	Julian Ocleppo (ITA)		1			0	1
1	Giovanni Oradini (ITA)		1			0	1
1	Junior Alexander Ore (USA)		1			0	1
1	Roberto Ortega Olmedo (ESP)		1			0	1
1	Michail Pervolarakis (GRE)		1			0	1
1	Antonio Prat (ESP)		1			0	1
1	Strahinja Rakić (SRB)		1			0	1
1	Quentin Robert (FRA)		1			0	1
1	Valentin Royer (FRA)		1			0	1
1	Sahar Simon (ISR)		1			0	1
1	Ilya Snițari (MDA)		1			0	1
1	Bart Stevens (NED)		1			0	1
1	Michael Vrbenský (CZE)		1			0	1
1	Beibit Zhukayev (KAZ)		1			0	1
1	Wissam Abderrahman (TUN)				1	0	1
1	Egor Agafonov (RUS)				1	0	1
1	Rishab Agarwal (IND)				1	0	1
1	Alafia Ayeni (USA)				1	0	1
1	Tadas Babelis (LTU)				1	0	1
1	Zvonimir Babić (CRO)				1	0	1
1	Sekou Bangoura (USA)				1	0	1
1	Alex Barrena (ARG)				1	0	1
1	Diego Augusto Barreto Sánchez (ESP)				1	0	1
1	Finn Bass (GBR)				1	0	1
1	John Bernard (USA)				1	0	1
1	Dali Blanch (USA)				1	0	1
1	César Bourgois (FRA)				1	0	1
1	Aleksandr Braynin (UKR)				1	0	1
1	Jacob Brumm (USA)				1	0	1
1	Tiago Cação (POR)				1	0	1
1	Julien Cagnina (BEL)				1	0	1
1	Juan Manuel Cerúndolo (ARG)				1	0	1
1	Anirudh Chandrasekar (IND)				1	0	1
1	Maxime Chazal (FRA)				1	0	1
1	Antoine Cornut-Chauvinc (FRA)				1	0	1
1	Ivan Denisov (RUS)				1	0	1
1	Sadio Doumbia (FRA)				1	0	1
1	Filip Duda (CZE)				1	0	1
1	Sandro Ehrat (SUI)				1	0	1
1	Jonathan Eysseric (FRA)				1	0	1
1	Arthur Fery (GBR)				1	0	1
1	Davide Galoppini (ITA)				1	0	1
1	Daniil Glinka (EST)				1	0	1
1	George Goldhoff (USA)				1	0	1
1	Federico Agustín Gómez (ARG)				1	0	1
1	Gerard Granollers (ESP)				1	0	1
1	Patrick Grigoriu (ROU)				1	0	1
1	Tom Hands (GBR)				1	0	1
1	Benjamin Hannestad (DEN)				1	0	1
1	Cleeve Harper (CAN)				1	0	1
1	Benjamin Hassan (GER)				1	0	1
1	August Holmgren (DEN)				1	0	1
1	Hua Runhao (CHN)				1	0	1
1	Pedro Iamachkine (PER)				1	0	1
1	Daniel Ibragimov (RUS)				1	0	1
1	Ronan Joncour (FRA)				1	0	1
1	David Jordà Sanchis (ESP)				1	0	1
1	Viktor Jović (SRB)				1	0	1
1	Danylo Kalenichenko (UKR)				1	0	1
1	Kweisi Kenyatte (USA)				1	0	1
1	Aleksei Khomich (BLR)				1	0	1
1	Szymon Kielan (POL)				1	0	1
1	Denis Klok (RUS)				1	0	1
1	Vladimir Korolev (RUS)				1	0	1
1	Bruno Kuzuhara (USA)				1	0	1
1	Kai Lemstra (GER)				1	0	1
1	Tomás Lipovšek Puches (SLO)				1	0	1
1	Imanol López Morillo (ESP)				1	0	1
1	Petru-Alexandru Luncanu (ROU)				1	0	1
1	Emiliano Maggioli (ITA)				1	0	1
1	Vladyslav Manafov (UKR)				1	0	1
1	Nikita Mashtakov (UKR)				1	0	1
1	Timur Maulenov (KAZ)				1	0	1
1	Mwendwa Mbithi (USA)				1	0	1
1	Hamad Međedović (SRB)				1	0	1
1	Vladislav Melnic (ROU)				1	0	1
1	Óscar Mesquida Berg (ESP)				1	0	1
1	Michał Mikuła (POL)				1	0	1
1	Krištof Minárik (SVK)				1	0	1
1	Mu Tao (CHN)				1	0	1
1	Takuto Niki (JPN)				1	0	1
1	Patrik Niklas-Salminen (FIN)				1	0	1
1	Frane Ninčević (CRO)				1	0	1
1	Kazuki Nishiwaki (JPN)				1	0	1
1	Petr Nouza (CZE)				1	0	1
1	Kosuke Ogura (JPN)				1	0	1
1	Genaro Alberto Olivieri (ARG)				1	0	1
1	Gian Marco Ortenzi (ITA)				1	0	1
1	Juan Sebastián Osorio (COL)				1	0	1
1	Oleksandr Ovcharenko (UKR)				1	0	1
1	Carl Emil Overbeck (DEN)				1	0	1
1	Kārlis Ozoliņš (LAT)				1	0	1
1	Park Ui-sung (KOR)				1	0	1
1	Bogdan Pavel (ROU)				1	0	1
1	Joshua Peck (CAN)				1	0	1
1	Sergi Pérez Contri (ESP)				1	0	1
1	Gabriele Piraino (ITA)				1	0	1
1	Samuele Pieri (ITA)				1	0	1
1	Lukáš Pokorný (SVK)				1	0	1
1	Sidané Pontjodikromo (NED)				1	0	1
1	Nathan Ponwith (USA)				1	0	1
1	Davide Pozzi (ITA)				1	0	1
1	Fabien Reboul (FRA)				1	0	1
1	Alexandre Reco (FRA)				1	0	1
1	Giorgi Ricca (ITA)				1	0	1
1	Ricardo Rodríguez-Pace (VEN)				1	0	1
1	Albert Roglan (ESP)				1	0	1
1	Nicolas Rousset (FRA)				1	0	1
1	Karl Kiur Saar (EST)				1	0	1
1	Yan Sabanin (RUS)				1	0	1
1	Keisuke Saitoh (JPN)				1	0	1
1	Nathan Seateun (FRA)				1	0	1
1	Marcello Serafini (ITA)				1	0	1
1	Marat Sharipov (RUS)				1	0	1
1	Abedallah Shelbayh (JOR)				1	0	1
1	Sho Shimabukuro (JPN)				1	0	1
1	Nitin Kumar Sinha (IND)				1	0	1
1	Roy Smith (USA)				1	0	1
1	Glenn Smits (NED)				1	0	1
1	John Sperle (GER)				1	0	1
1	Robin Staněk (CZE)				1	0	1
1	Dominic Stricker (SUI)				1	0	1
1	Daisuke Sumizawa (JPN)				1	0	1
1	Dane Sweeny (AUS)				1	0	1
1	Giorgio Tabacco (ITA)				1	0	1
1	Naoki Tajima (JPN)				1	0	1
1	Ryota Tanuma (JPN)				1	0	1
1	Marko Tepavac (SRB)				1	0	1
1	Jean Thirouin (FRA)				1	0	1
1	Pol Toledo Bagué (ESP)				1	0	1
1	Wishaya Trongcharoenchaikul (THA)				1	0	1
1	Kaito Uesugi (JPN)				1	0	1
1	Vishnu Vardhan (IND)				1	0	1
1	Gonzalo Villanueva (ARG)				1	0	1
1	Augusto Virgili (ITA)				1	0	1
1	Niels Visker (NED)				1	0	1
1	Benjamín Winter López (ESP)				1	0	1
1	Jumpei Yamasaki (JPN)				1	0	1
1	Zhang Ze (CHN)				1	0	1

=== Titles won by nation ===
2021 Titles won by nation

Total	Nation	M25		M15		Total	
Total	Nation	S	D	S	D	S	D
69	France (FRA)	17	15	16	21	33	36
66	Italy (ITA)	5	7	24	30	29	37
66	Argentina (ARG)	10	4	18	34	28	38
63	United States (USA)	8	12	18	25	26	37
56	Great Britain (GBR)	6	6	22	22	28	28
39	Spain (ESP)	9	3	12	15	21	18
34	Brazil (BRA)	6	11	8	9	14	20
33	Germany (GER)	4	8	7	14	11	22
31	Australia (AUS)	4	5	9	13	13	18
27	Switzerland (SUI)	2	7	7	11	9	18
27	Netherlands (NED)	3	7	5	12	8	19
26	Russia (RUS)	4	3	9	10	13	13
26	Czech Republic (CZE)	2	5	9	10	11	15
26	Japan (JPN)	5	3	5	13	10	16
24	Ukraine (UKR)		2	7	15	7	17
23	Austria (AUT)	2	4	6	11	8	15
20	Hungary (HUN)	4	1	10	5	14	6
17	Poland (POL)		3	5	9	5	12
17	Tunisia (TUN)		3	5	9	5	12
16	Sweden (SWE)		2	6	8	6	10
16	Romania (ROU)		1	3	12	3	13
13	Chile (CHI)		1	8	4	8	5
13	India (IND)		1	2	10	2	11
12	Belgium (BEL)	1	1	6	4	7	5
12	Chinese Taipei (TPE)	1	1	4	6	5	7
11	Greece (GRE)		7		4	0	11
10	Denmark (DEN)			2	8	2	8
9	South Korea (KOR)			4	5	4	5
9	Portugal (POR)	1	3	1	4	2	7
9	Uzbekistan (UZB)	1	4		4	1	8
9	Kazakhstan (KAZ)		1		8	0	9
8	China (CHN)			4	4	4	4
8	Colombia (COL)	1	5		2	1	7
7	Turkey (TUR)	1	1	5		6	1
7	Israel (ISR)	2	2	2	1	4	3
7	Moldova (MDA)		2		5	0	7
6	Dominican Republic (DOM)	2		3	1	5	1
6	Canada (CAN)	1		2	3	3	3
6	Serbia (SRB)		1	3	2	3	3
6	Peru (PER)	1	3		2	1	5
6	New Zealand (NZL)				6	0	6
5	Bulgaria (BUL)	1	2	1	1	2	3
5	Finland (FIN)	1	1	1	2	2	3
5	Belarus (BLR)		1		4	0	5
4	Bolivia (BOL)		2		2	0	4
3	Lebanon (LBN)			3		3	0
3	Vietnam (VIE)			3		3	0
3	Mexico (MEX)		3			0	3
3	Latvia (LAT)		2		1	0	3
3	Croatia (CRO)		1		2	0	3
3	Zimbabwe (ZIM)		1		2	0	3
3	Uruguay (URU)				3	0	3
2	Norway (NOR)	2				2	0
2	Bosnia and Herzegovina (BIH)			2		2	0
2	Ivory Coast (CIV)			2		2	0
2	Monaco (MON)			2		2	0
2	Burundi (BDI)			1	1	1	1
2	Cyprus (CYP)			1	1	1	1
2	Northern Mariana Islands (NMI)			1	1	1	1
2	Ecuador (ECU)		2			0	2
2	Philippines (PHI)		2			0	2
2	Slovakia (SVK)		1		1	0	2
2	Syria (SYR)				2	0	2
2	Venezuela (VEN)				2	0	2
1	Montenegro (MNE)			1		1	0
1	Ireland (IRL)		1			0	1
1	South Africa (RSA)		1			0	1
1	Estonia (EST)				1	0	1
1	Jordan (JOR)				1	0	1
1	Lithuania (LTU)				1	0	1
1	Slovenia (SLO)				1	0	1
1	Thailand (THA)				1	0	1

== See also ==
- 2021 ATP Tour
- 2021 ATP Challenger Tour
- 2021 ITF Women's World Tennis Tour
