= Raluca Șerban =

Romanian-Cypriot female tennis player (born 1997)

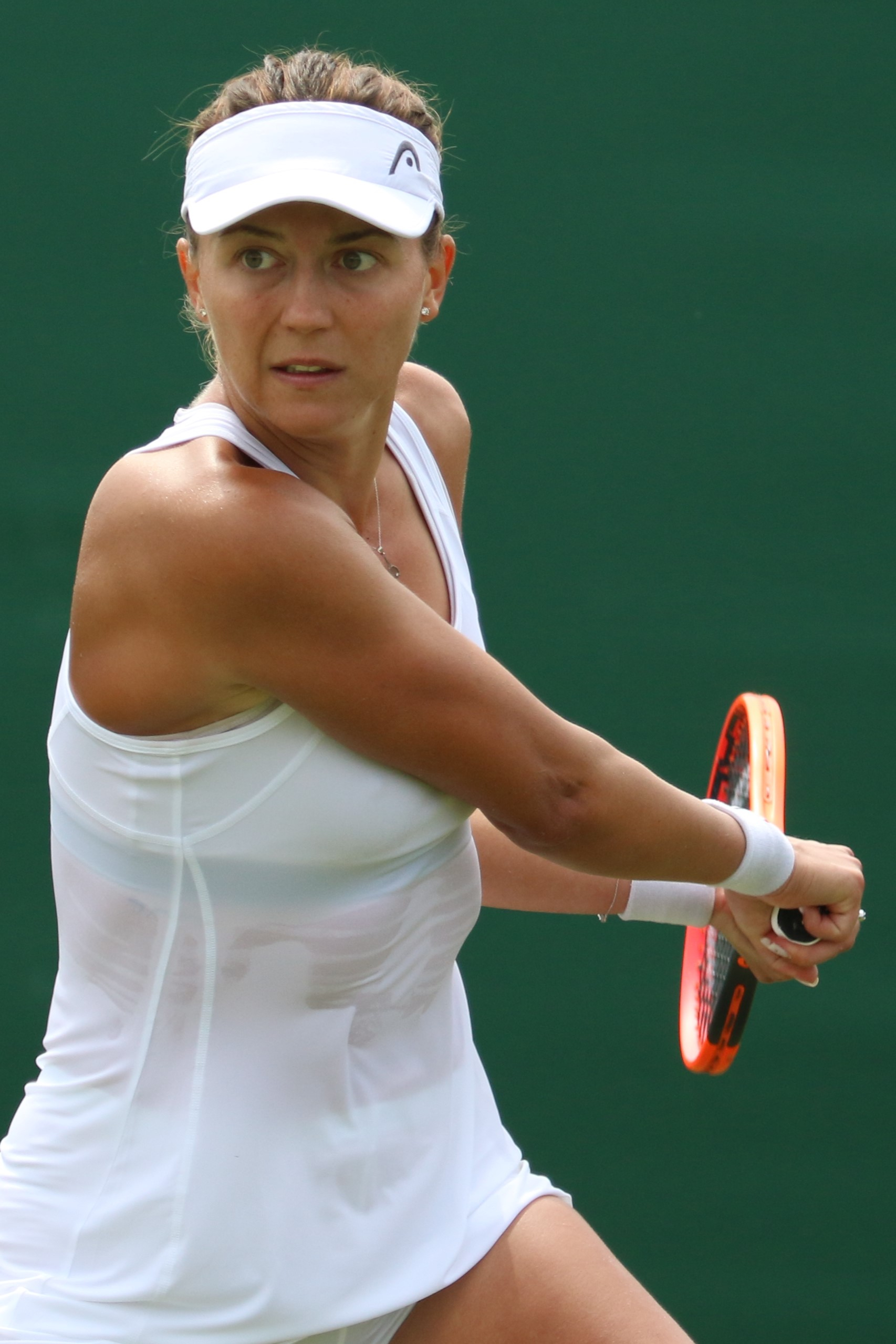
- Șerban at the 2023 Wimbledon Championships
- Full name: Raluca Georgiana Șerban
- Country (sports): Cyprus (2019–current); Romania (2013–2018)
- Residence: Cyprus
- Born: 17 June 1997 (age 29) Constanța, Romania
- Height: 1.85 m (6 ft 1 in)
- Turned pro: 2013
- Plays: Right (two-handed backhand)
- Prize money: $676,235
- Official website: https://serbanraluca.com/

Singles
- Career record: 396–245
- Career titles: 14 ITF
- Highest ranking: No. 152 (24 July 2023)
- Current ranking: No. 409 (12 October 2026)

Grand Slam singles results
- Australian Open: Q2 (2024, 2025)
- French Open: Q3 (2024)
- Wimbledon: Q3 (2025)
- US Open: Q1 (2019, 2022, 2023)

Doubles
- Career record: 163–97
- Career titles: 15 ITF
- Highest ranking: No. 176 (14 January 2019)
- Current ranking: No. 531 (12 October 2026)

Team competitions
- Fed Cup: 20–9
- Last updated on: 14 October 2026.

Raluca Georgiana Șerban (Greek: Ραλούκα Τζεορτζιάνα Σερμπάν; born 17 June 1997) is a Romanian-born Cypriot professional tennis player, who since 2019 has represented Cyprus. She has a career-high singles ranking of world No. 152, achieved on 24 July 2023, becoming the only Cypriot player to have been ranked inside the WTA top 300.

Competing in Billie Jean King Cup, she has a 20–9 record as of September 2026.

== Career ==
Șerban has won 14 singles and 15 doubles titles on the ITF Women's Circuit.

She made her WTA Tour main-draw doubles debut at the 2018 Luxembourg Open, in the doubles event partnering Isabella Shinikova, and the pair reached the semifinals.

At the 2022 Budapest Grand Prix, she made her WTA Tour singles debut.

Șerban qualified for the 2025 Copa Colsanitas and defeated Nuria Párrizas Díaz in the first round to become the first Cypriot player to win a WTA Tour level main draw match. She lost her next match to top seed Marie Bouzková.

== Performance timeline ==
Key
W	F	SF	QF	#R	RR	Q#	DNQ	A	NH

(W) winner; (F) finalist; (SF) semifinalist; (QF) quarterfinalist; (#R) rounds 4, 3, 2, 1; (RR) round-robin stage; (Q#) qualification round; (DNQ) did not qualify; (A) absent; (NH) not held; (SR) strike rate (events won / competed); (W–L) win–loss record.
To avoid confusion and double counting, these charts are updated at the conclusion of a tournament or when the player's participation has ended.

Only main-draw results in WTA Tour, Grand Slam tournaments, Fed Cup/Billie Jean King Cup, and Olympic Games are included in win–loss records.

=== Singles ===
Current through the 2025 US Open.

Tournament	2019	2020	2021	2022	2023	2024	2025	W–L
Grand Slam tournaments
Australian Open	Q1	A	A	A	Q1	Q2	Q2	0–0
French Open	A	A	A	Q1	Q1	Q3	Q1	0–0
Wimbledon	Q1	NH	A	Q1	Q2	Q1	Q3	0–0
US Open	Q1	A	A	Q1	Q1	A	A	0–0
Win–Loss	0–0	0–0	0–0	0–0	0–0	0–0	0–0	0–0
Career statistics
Tournaments	0 (Note: During the season, she did not play in the main-draw of any WTA Tour-level tournaments. However, she played at the Billie Jean King Cup, which is not counted as a played tournament but matches count.)	0	0	1	1	0	0	Total: 2
Overall Win-Loss	4–1	0–0	3–0	0–1	0–1	4–1	1–3	12–7

== WTA 125 finals ==
=== Doubles: 1 (1 runner-up) ===
Result	W–L	Date	Tournament	Surface	Partner	Opponents	Score
Loss	0–1	Oct 2026	Lisboa Belém Open, Portugal	Clay	(Poland) Gina Feistel	(Slovenia) Dalila Jakupović (Slovenia) Nika Radišić	3–6, 1–6

== ITF Circuit finals ==
=== Singles: 26 (15 titles, 11 runner-ups) ===
Legend
W60/75 tournaments
W50 tournaments
W25/35 tournaments
W10/15 tournaments

Result	W–L	Date	Tournament	Tier	Surface	Opponent	Score
Win	1–0	Apr 2015	ITF Heraklion, Greece	10,000	Hard	(Spain) Cristina Sánchez-Quintanar	6–2, 6–3
Win	2–0	Apr 2015	ITF Heraklion, Greece	10,000	Hard	(Hungary) Anna Bondár	4–6, 6–4, 6–1
Win	3–0	Apr 2016	ITF Heraklion, Greece	10,000	Hard	(Italy) Cristiana Ferrando	6–3, 7–6^{(4)}
Loss	3–1	Jun 2016	ITF Antalya, Turkey	10,000	Hard	(Turkey) Ayla Aksu	3–6, 3–6
Win	4–1	Nov 2016	ITF Heraklion, Greece	10,000	Hard	(United Kingdom) Gabriella Taylor	6–4, 7–5
Win	5–1	Nov 2016	ITF Heraklion, Greece	10,000	Hard	(Netherlands) Nina Kruijer	3–6, 4–0 ret.
Win	6–1	Jan 2017	ITF Antalya, Turkey	15,000	Clay	(Ukraine) Alena Fomina	6–2, 6–3
Loss	6–2	Mar 2017	ITF Heraklion, Greece	15,000	Clay	(Serbia) Dejana Radanović	4–6, 6–7^{(1)}
Win	7–2	May 2017	ITF Antalya, Turkey	15,000	Clay	(United States) Dasha Ivanova	7–5, 6–2
Loss	7–3	Sep 2017	ITF Antalya, Turkey	15,000	Clay	(Greece) Despina Papamichail	6–3, 2–6, 6–7^{(6)}
Win	8–3	Mar 2018	ITF Heraklion, Greece	15,000	Clay	(Czech Republic) Anastasia Dețiuc	6–3, 5–7, 6–2
Loss	8–4	Apr 2018	Chiasso Open, Switzerland	25,000	Clay	(Netherlands) Cindy Burger	7–6^{(4)}, 4–6, 3–6
Loss	8–5	May 2018	ITF Balatonboglár, Hungary	25,000	Clay	(Slovenia) Kaja Juvan	4–6, 1–6
Win	9–5	Oct 2018	ITF Pula, Italy	25,000	Clay	(Italy) Anastasia Grymalska	7–6^{(2)}, 6–4
Win	10–5	Oct 2018	ITF Istanbul, Turkey	25,000	Hard (i)	(Serbia) Nina Stojanović	6–2, 7–5
Loss	10–6	Nov 2018	ITF Minsk, Belarus	25,000	Hard (i)	(Belarus) Yuliya Hatouka	5–7, 5–7
Win	11–6	Sep 2021	ITF Santarém, Portugal	W25	Hard	(Ukraine) Daria Snigur	6–3, 6–4
Win	12–6	Apr 2022	Bellinzona Ladies Open, Switzerland	W60	Clay	(Georgia (country)) Ekaterine Gorgodze	6–3, 6–0
Win	13–6	Oct 2022	ITF Seville, Spain	W25	Clay	(Turkey) İpek Öz	6–3, 6–0
Loss	13–7	Feb 2023	Guanajuato Open, Mexico	W60+H	Hard	Kamilla Rakhimova	0–6, 6–1, 2–6
Loss	13–8	May 2023	ITF Larnaca, Cyprus	W25	Clay	(Hungary) Tímea Babos	4–6, 7–5, 6–7^{(5)}
Loss	13–9	Jun 2023	Internazionali di Caserta, Italy	W60	Clay	(United States) Hailey Baptiste	3–6, 2–6
Loss	13–10	Jul 2023	Internazionale ATV Roma, Italy	W60	Clay	(Spain) Jéssica Bouzas Maneiro	2–6, 4–6
Win	14–10	Apr 2024	Florianópolis Open, Brazil	W75	Clay	(France) Séléna Janicijevic	7–5, 6–2
Loss	14–11	Sep 2024	ITF Kuršumlijska Banja, Serbia	W75	Clay	(Serbia) Lola Radivojević	2–6, 6–7^{(7)}
Win	15–11	Nov 2026	ITF Heraklion, Greece	W50	Clay	(Greece) Martha Matoula	3–6, 6–3, 6–1

=== Doubles: 30 (15 titles, 15 runner-ups) ===
Legend
W80 tournaments
W60/75 tournaments
W40/50 tournaments
W25 tournaments
W10/15 tournaments

Result	W–L	Date	Tournament	Tier	Surface	Partner	Opponents	Score
Loss	0–1	Mar 2014	ITF Antalya, Turkey	10k	Clay	(Romania) Nicoleta Dascălu	(China) Li Yihong (China) Zhu Lin	6–3, 3–6, [3–10]
Loss	0–2	May 2014	ITF Sibiu, Romania	10k	Clay	(Czech Republic) Vendula Žovincová	(Romania) Camelia Hristea (Romania) Oana Georgeta Simion	6–7^{(2)}, 1–6
Win	1–2	Nov 2014	ITF Heraklion, Greece	10k	Hard	(Romania) Oana Georgeta Simion	(Serbia) Natalija Kostić (Serbia) Nevena Selaković	6–4, 6–2
Win	2–2	Oct 2015	ITF Heraklion, Greece	10k	Hard	(Slovakia) Viktória Kužmová	(Belgium) Steffi Distelmans (Netherlands) Kelly Versteeg	6–2, 6–0
Loss	2–3	Mar 2016	ITF Antalya, Turkey	10k	Clay	(Romania) Andreea Ghițescu	(Austria) Yvonne Neuwirth (Austria) Nicole Rottmann	6–2, 4–6, [5–10]
Loss	2–4	Apr 2016	ITF Heraklion, Greece	10k	Hard	(Russia) Kseniia Bekker	(Italy) Cristiana Ferrando (Hungary) Dalma Gálfi	4–6, 7–5, [12–14]
Loss	2–5	Jun 2016	ITF Antalya, Turkey	10k	Hard	(Italy) Miriana Tona	(Netherlands) Arianne Hartono (New Zealand) Paige Hourigan	3–6, ret.
Win	3–5	Nov 2016	ITF Heraklion, Greece	10k	Hard	(Israel) Vlada Ekshibarova	(Italy) Cristiana Ferrando (Belgium) Michaela Boev	6–4, 7–6^{(4)}
Loss	3–6	Mar 2017	ITF Heraklion, Greece	15k	Clay	(Romania) Oana Georgeta Simion	(Slovakia) Michaela Hončová (Italy) Francesca Palmigiano	4–6, 3–6
Win	4–6	Mar 2017	ITF Heraklion, Greece	15k	Clay	(Romania) Oana Georgeta Simion	(Canada) Charlotte Robillard-Millette (Canada) Carol Zhao	3–6, 7–6^{(2)}, [10–2]
Win	5–6	Jun 2017	ITF Figueira da Foz, Portugal	25k	Hard	(Turkey) Ayla Aksu	(Colombia) María Fernanda Herazo (Mexico) Victoria Rodríguez	6–4, 6–1
Win	6–6	Jul 2017	ITF Stuttgart, Germany	25k	Clay	(Russia) Kseniia Bekker	(Germany) Laura Schaeder (Germany) Anna Zaja	6–3, 5–7, [10–5]
Loss	6–7	Jul 2017	ITS Cup, Czech Republic	80k	Clay	(Slovakia) Michaela Hončová	(France) Amandine Hesse (Mexico) Victoria Rodríguez	6–3, 2–6, [6–10]
Win	7–7	Jan 2018	ITF Stuttgart, Germany	15k	Hard (i)	(Romania) Laura Ioana Paar	(Czech Republic) Petra Krejsová (Czech Republic) Jesika Malečková	6–0, 6–7^{(7)}, [10–5]
Win	8–7	Feb 2018	ITF Antalya, Turkey	15k	Hard	(Romania) Oana Georgeta Simion	(Japan) Mana Ayukawa (Switzerland) Nina Stadler	6–2, 7–6^{(5)}
Win	9–7	Mar 2018	ITF Heraklion, Greece	15k	Clay	(Belgium) Michaela Boev	(Romania) Gabriela Davidescu (Romania) Alexandra Stăiculescu	6–1, 2–6, [10–7]
Loss	9–8	Mar 2018	ITF Heraklion, Greece	15k	Clay	(Belgium) Michaela Boev	(The Bahamas) Kerrie Cartwright (United States) Kariann Pierre-Louis	4–6, 5–7
Win	10–8	May 2018	ITF Balatonboglár, Hungary	25k	Clay	(Hungary) Anna Bondár	(Hungary) Ágnes Bukta (Hungary) Dalma Gálfi	6–1, 7–6^{(2)}
Loss	10–9	May 2018	ITF Les Franqueses del Vallès, Spain	25k	Hard	(India) Pranjala Yadlapalli	(Mexico) Giuliana Olmos (Brazil) Laura Pigossi	4–6, 4–6
Loss	10–10	Jun 2018	ITF Madrid, Spain	25k	Clay (i)	(Russia) Anastasia Pribylova	(Paraguay) Montserrat González (China) Wang Xiyu	4–6, 6–7^{(4)}
Win	11–10	Aug 2018	ITF Koksijde, Belgium	25k	Clay	(Hungary) Anna Bondár	(Bosnia and Herzegovina) Dea Herdželaš (Slovakia) Tereza Mihalíková	6–3, 6–0
Win	12–10	Jul 2019	Prague Open, Czech Republic	W60	Clay	(Romania) Nicoleta Dascălu	(Czech Republic) Lucie Hradecká (Czech Republic) Johana Marková	6–4, 6–4
Win	13–10	Oct 2019	ITF Nanning, China	W25	Hard	(Russia) Ksenia Laskutova	(China) Cao Siqi (China) Wang Danni	6–2, 6–4
Loss	13–11	Jan 2020	Open Andrézieux-Bouthéon, France	W60	Hard (i)	(Georgia (country)) Ekaterine Gorgodze	(Romania) Jaqueline Cristian (Romania) Elena-Gabriela Ruse	6–7^{(6)}, 7–6^{(4)}, [8–10]
Loss	13–12	Sep 2020	Zubr Cup, Czech Republic	W25	Clay	(Romania) Nicoleta Dascălu	(Slovakia) Chantal Škamlová (Czech Republic) Tereza Smitková	6–7^{(5)}, 6–7^{(4)}
Loss	13–13	May 2021	ITF Otočec, Slovenia	W25	Clay	(Croatia) Lea Bošković	(Italy) Federica di Sarra (Italy) Camilla Rosatello	4–6, 7–6^{(4)}, [4–10]
Win	14–13	Feb 2023	ITF Mexico City	W40	Hard	(Greece) Despina Papamichail	(Colombia) Yuliana Lizarazo (Colombia) María Paulina Pérez	3–6, 6–4, [10–4]
Loss	14–14	May 2023	ITF Larnaca, Cyprus	W25	Clay	(Cyprus) Maria Siopacha	(Germany) Luisa Meyer auf der Heide (Italy) Miriana Tona	5–7, 4–6
Win	15–14	Jun 2024	ITF Troisdorf, Germany	W50	Clay	(Romania) Anca Todoni	(United States) Chiara Scholl (Germany) Yana Morderger	6–0, 6–3
Loss	15–15	Sep 2024	Šibenik Open, Croatia	W75	Clay	(Romania) Anca Todoni	(Slovenia) Živa Falkner (Hungary) Amarissa Tóth	1–2 ret.

== National representation ==
=== Games of the Small States of Europe ===
==== Singles: 1 (1 win) ====
Result	W–L	Date	Location	Surface	Opponent	Score
Win	1–0	Jun 2017	City of San Marino	Clay	(Luxembourg) Eléonora Molinaro	7–5, 6–4

==== Doubles: 2 (2 wins) ====
Result	W–L	Date	Location	Surface	Partner	Opponents	Score
Win	1–0	Jun 2017	City of San Marino	Clay	(Cyprus) Maria Siopacha	(Malta) Francesca Curmi (Malta) Elaine Genovese	6–2, 6–4
Win	2–0	Jun 2019	Budva, Montenegro	Clay	(Cyprus) Eleni Louka	(Malta) Francesca Curmi (Malta) Elaine Genovese	6–2, 6–3

==== Mixed doubles: 3 (2 wins, 1 runner-up) ====
Result	W–L	Date	Location	Surface	Partner	Opponents	Score
Win	1–0	Jun 2015	Reykjavik, Iceland	Hard (i)	(Cyprus) Petros Chrysochos	(Luxembourg) Claudine Schaul (Luxembourg) Mike Scheidweiler	6–4, 7–6^{(7–4)}
Loss	1–1	Jun 2017	City of San Marino	Clay	(Cyprus) Eleftherios Neos	(Luxembourg) Eléonora Molinaro (Luxembourg) Ugo Nastasi	3–6, 4–6
Win	2–1	Jun 2019	Budva, Montenegro	Clay	(Cyprus) Eleftherios Neos	(Montenegro) Vladica Babić (Montenegro) Rrezart Cungu	6–4, 3–6, [10–7]
