= Tennis at the 2017 Games of the Small States of Europe =

- Date: 30 May–03 June
- Location: Montecchio Tennis Center, San Marino, San Marino

Champions

Men's singles
- Florent Diep (MON)

Women's singles
- Raluca Șerban (CYP)

Men's doubles
- Menelaos Efstathiou / Eleftherios Neos (CYP)

Women's doubles
- Maria Siopacha / Raluca Șerban (CYP)

Mixed doubles
- Eléonora Molinaro / Ugo Nastasi (LUX)
← 2015 ·	Games of the Small States of Europe	· 2019 →

The tennis competitions at the 2017 Games of the Small States of Europe were held from 30 May to 3 June 2017 at the Montecchio Tennis Center, San Marino.

== Medal table ==
Rank	Nation	Gold	Silver	Bronze	Total
1	Cyprus (CYP)	3	1	1	5
2	Luxembourg (LUX)	1	2	1	4
3	Monaco (MON)	1	1	1	3
4	Malta (MLT)	0	1	4	5
5	San Marino (SMR)*	0	0	2	2
Totals (5 entries)		5	5	9	19

== Medal events ==
Event	Gold	Silver	Bronze
Men's singles	Florent Diep; Monaco	Ugo Nastasi; Luxembourg	Lucas Catarina; Monaco
Men's singles	Florent Diep; Monaco	Ugo Nastasi; Luxembourg	Eleftherios Neos; Cyprus
Women's singles	Raluca Georgiana Serban; Cyprus	Eléonora Molinaro; Luxembourg	Francesca Curmi; Malta
Women's singles	Raluca Georgiana Serban; Cyprus	Eléonora Molinaro; Luxembourg	Elaine Genovese; Malta
Men's doubles	Cyprus; Menelaos Efstathiou; Eleftherios Neos	Monaco; Florent Diep; Thomas Oger	Luxembourg; Alex Knaff; Ugo Nastasi
Men's doubles	Cyprus; Menelaos Efstathiou; Eleftherios Neos	Monaco; Florent Diep; Thomas Oger	Malta; Matthew Asciak; Omar Sudzuka
Women's doubles	Cyprus; Maria Siopacha; Raluca Georgiana Serban	Malta; Francesca Curmi; Elaine Genovese	San Marino; Martina Agarici; Gioia Barbieri
Mixed doubles	Luxembourg; Eléonora Molinaro; Ugo Nastasi	Cyprus; Raluca Georgiana Serban; Eleftherios Neos	Malta; Elaine Genovese; Matthew Asciak
Mixed doubles	Luxembourg; Eléonora Molinaro; Ugo Nastasi	Cyprus; Raluca Georgiana Serban; Eleftherios Neos	San Marino; Gioia Barbieri; Marco De Rossi

== Men's singles ==
First round
1	(Monaco) F Diep	6	3	6
(Andorra) L Recouderc	3	6	1
(Luxembourg) A Knaff	6	6
(Malta) O Sudzuka	1	1
3	(Cyprus) E Neos	6	6
(Iceland) B Gunnarsson	3	3
(San Marino) P Grassi	3	6^{5}
(Liechtenstein) R Forster	6	7^{7}
(Liechtenstein) V Leuch	6	1	0
(Luxembourg) U Nastasi	2	6	6
(Malta) M Asciak	6^{7}	7	7
4	(Cyprus) M Efstathiou	7^{9}	5	5
(San Marino) M De Rossi	6	6
(Iceland) R Bonifacius	3	3
(Andorra) E Noguer	3	0
2	(Monaco) L Catarina	6	6

Quarterfinals
1	(Monaco) F Diep	6	7^{7}
(Luxembourg) A Knaff	3	6^{4}
3	(Cyprus) E Neos	6	6
(Liechtenstein) R Forster	1	3
(Luxembourg) U Nastasi	4	6	6
(Malta) M Asciak	6	4	1
(San Marino) M De Rossi	2	7	1
2	(Monaco) L Catarina	6	5	6

Semifinals
1	(Monaco) F Diep	6	6
3	(Cyprus) E Neos	4	4
(Luxembourg) U Nastasi	6	7^{7}
2	(Monaco) L Catarina	4	6^{5}

Gold match medal
1	(Monaco) F Diep	6	6
(Luxembourg) U Nastasi	3	4

== Women's singles ==
First Round
(Andorra) J Alana	6	7^{7}
(Iceland) A Grönholm	4	6^{4}
(Malta) F Curmi	6	6
(Iceland) H Brynjarsdóttir	0	2

Quarterfinals
1	(Cyprus) R Serban	6	6
(Andorra) J Alana	0	0
3	(Malta) E Genovese	7	6
(San Marino) G Barbieri	5	3
(Cyprus) M Siopacha	6	2	4
(Malta) F Curmi	4	6	6
(San Marino) M Agarici	0	0
2	(Luxembourg) E Molinaro	6	6

Semifinals
1	(Cyprus) R Serban	6	6
3	(Malta) E Genovese	1	1
(Malta) F Curmi	4	3
2	(Luxembourg) E Molinaro	6	6

Gold medal match
1	(Cyprus) R Serban	7	6
2	(Luxembourg) E Molinaro	5	4

== Men's doubles ==
Quarterfinals
1	(Monaco) F Diep (Monaco) T Oger	6	6
(Liechtenstein) V Leuch (Liechtenstein) T Kranz	1	3
(Malta) M Asciak (Malta) O Sudzuka	w/o
(Andorra) E Noguer (Andorra) L Recouderc
(Luxembourg) A Knaff (Luxembourg) U Nastasi	7	6
(San Marino) M De Rossi (San Marino) P Grassi	5	0
(Iceland) R Bonifacius (Iceland) B Gunnarsson	3	3
2	(Cyprus) M Efstathiou (Cyprus) E Neos	6	6

Semifinals
1	(Monaco) F Diep (Monaco) T Oger	6	6
(Malta) M Asciak (Malta) O Sudzuka	1	0
(Luxembourg) A Knaff (Luxembourg) U Nastasi	6	4	11
2	(Cyprus) M Efstathiou (Cyprus) E Neos	4	6	[13]

Gold medal match
1	(Monaco) F Diep (Monaco) T Oger	7	2	[5]
2	(Cyprus) M Efstathiou (Cyprus) E Neos	5	6	[10]

== Women's doubles ==
Semifinals
1	(Cyprus) M Siopacha (Cyprus) R Serban	6	6
(San Marino) M Agarici (San Marino) G Barbieri	2	1
(Iceland) H Brynjarsdóttir (Iceland) A Grönholm	0	4
2	(Malta) F Curmi (Malta) E Genovese	6	6

Gold medal match
1	(Cyprus) M Siopacha (Cyprus) R Serban	6	6
2	(Malta) F Curmi (Malta) E Genovese	2	4
Bronze medal match
(San Marino) M Agarici (San Marino) G Barbieri	6	6
(Iceland) H Brynjarsdóttir (Iceland) A Grönholm	4	3

== Mixed doubles ==
Quarterfinals				Semifinals					Gold medal match
				1	(Cyprus) E Neos (Cyprus) R Serban	6	6
(San Marino) M De Rossi (San Marino) G Barbieri		6	6		(San Marino) M De Rossi (San Marino) G Barbieri	4	4
(Andorra) E Noguer (Andorra) J Alana		3	2						1	(Cyprus) E Neos (Cyprus) R Serban	3	4
3	(Malta) M Asciak (Malta) E Genovese	6	6						2	(Luxembourg) U Nastasi (Luxembourg) E Molinaro	6	6
	(Iceland) H Brynjarsdóttir (Iceland) B Gunnarsson	1	2	3	(Malta) M Asciak (Malta) E Genovese	6	1	[8]
				2	(Luxembourg) U Nastasi (Luxembourg) E Molinaro	1	6	[10]
