= Tennis at the 2019 Games of the Small States of Europe =

- Date: 28 May – 1 June
- Location: Slovenska Plaža Tennis Center, Budva, Montenegro

Champions

Men's singles
- Romain Arneodo (MON)

Women's singles
- Vladica Babić (MNE)

Men's doubles
- Menelaos Efstathiou / Eleftherios Neos (CYP)

Women's doubles
- Eleni Louka / Raluca Șerban (CYP)

Mixed doubles
- Raluca Șerban / Eleftherios Neos (CYP)
← 2017 ·	Games of the Small States of Europe	· 2021 →

The tennis competitions at the 2019 Games of the Small States of Europe was held from 28 May to 1 June 2019 at the Slovenska Plaža Tennis Center, Montenegro.

== Medal table ==
* Host nation (Montenegro)

Rank	Nation	Gold	Silver	Bronze	Total
1	Cyprus (CYP)	3	0	1	4
2	Monaco (MON)	1	1	2	4
3	Montenegro (MNE)*	1	1	1	3
4	Luxembourg (LUX)	0	2	2	4
5	Malta (MLT)	0	1	1	2
6	Liechtenstein (LIE)	0	0	1	1
6	San Marino (SMR)	0	0	1	1
Totals (7 entries)		5	5	9	19

== Medal events ==
Event	Gold	Silver	Bronze
Men's singles	Romain Arneodo; Monaco	Ugo Nastasi; Luxembourg	Lucas Catarina; Monaco
Men's singles	Romain Arneodo; Monaco	Ugo Nastasi; Luxembourg	Marco De Rossi; San Marino
Women's singles	Vladica Babić; Montenegro	Eléonora Molinaro; Luxembourg	Raluca Șerban; Cyprus
Women's singles	Vladica Babić; Montenegro	Eléonora Molinaro; Luxembourg	Elaine Genovese; Malta
Men's doubles	Cyprus; Menelaos Efstathiou; Eleftherios Neos	Monaco; Lucas Catarina; Romain Arneodo	Liechtenstein; Vital Leuch; Timo Kranz
Men's doubles	Cyprus; Menelaos Efstathiou; Eleftherios Neos	Monaco; Lucas Catarina; Romain Arneodo	Montenegro; Mario Aleksić; Rrezart Cungu
Women's doubles	Cyprus; Eleni Louka; Raluca Șerban	Malta; Francesca Curmi; Elaine Genovese	Luxembourg; Eléonora Molinaro; Claudine Schaul
Mixed doubles	Cyprus; Raluca Șerban; Eleftherios Neos	Montenegro; Vladica Babić; Rrezart Cungu	Luxembourg; Eléonora Molinaro; Ugo Nastasi
Mixed doubles	Cyprus; Raluca Șerban; Eleftherios Neos	Montenegro; Vladica Babić; Rrezart Cungu	Monaco; Danae Petroula; Florent Diep

== Men's singles ==
=== Seeds ===
1. (Monaco) Lucas Catarina (semifinals)
2. (Luxembourg) Alex Knaff (first round, retired)

3. (San Marino) Marco de Rossi (semifinals)
4. (Liechtenstein) Vital Leuch (first round)

First round
1	(Monaco) L Catarina	6	6
(Cyprus) M Efstathiou	3	2
(Iceland) B Gunnarsson	3	6	6
(Malta) O Sudzuka	6	2	4
4	(Liechtenstein) V Leuch	1	1
(San Marino) S Galvani	6	6
(Montenegro) R Cungu	6	4
(Luxembourg) U Nastasi	7	6
(Malta) M Asciak	6	6
(Andorra) P Rodeiro Stetson	3	2
(Cyprus) S Savva	4	3
3	(San Marino) M de Rossi	6	6
(Monaco) R Arneodo	6	6
(Montenegro) M Aleksić	4	1
(Iceland) R Bonifacius	2	2
2	(Luxembourg) A Knaff	6	3^{r}

Quarterfinals
1	(Monaco) L Catarina	6	6
(Iceland) B Gunnarsson	0	1
(San Marino) S Galvani	6	3
(Luxembourg) U Nastasi	7	6
(Malta) M Asciak	6	3	1^{r}
3	(San Marino) M de Rossi	1	6	4
(Monaco) R Arneodo	w/o
(Iceland) R Bonifacius

Semifinals
1	(Monaco) L Catarina	6	6	2
(Luxembourg) U Nastasi	4	7	6
3	(San Marino) M de Rossi	3	0
(Monaco) R Arneodo	6	6

Gold match medal
(Luxembourg) U Nastasi	2	6
(Monaco) R Arneodo	6	7

== Women's singles ==
=== Seeds ===
1. (Cyprus) Raluca Șerban (semifinals)
2. (Luxembourg) Eléonora Molinaro (final)

3. (Montenegro) Vladica Babić (champion)
4. (Malta) Elaine Genovese (semifinals)

First round
(Malta) F Curmi	2	6	2
(Liechtenstein) S Zünd	6	1	6
(Luxembourg) M Weckerle	6	6
(Iceland) H Brynjarsdóttir	4	0
(Monaco) D Petroula	6	7
(Iceland) A Grönholm	1	6
(Cyprus) M Siopacha	3	2
4	(Malta) E Genovese	6	6
(Andorra) V Jiménez Kasintseva	6	6	1
(Montenegro) A Drašković	7	0	0

Quarterfinals
1	(Cyprus) R Șerban	6	6
(Liechtenstein) S Zünd	0	0
3	(Montenegro) V Babić	6	6
(Luxembourg) M Weckerle	2	2
(Monaco) D Petroula	2	3
4	(Malta) E Genovese	6	6
(Andorra) V Jiménez Kasintseva	3	1
2	(Luxembourg) E Molinaro	6	6

Semifinals
1	(Cyprus) R Șerban	6	6	0
3	(Montenegro) V Babić	4	7	6
4	(Malta) E Genovese	3	0
2	(Luxembourg) E Molinaro	6	6

Gold medal match
3	(Montenegro) V Babić	4	7	6
2	(Luxembourg) E Molinaro	6	6	4

== Men's doubles ==
First round
(Montenegro) M Aleksić (Montenegro) R Cungu	6	6
(Malta) M Asciak (Malta) O Sudzuka	2	1

Quarterfinals
1	(Monaco) L Catarina (Monaco) R Arneodo	6	1	[11]
(San Marino) M de Rossi (San Marino) P Grassi	1	6	[9]
3	(Liechtenstein) V Leuch (Liechtenstein) T Kranz	6	6
(Iceland) R Bonifacius (Iceland) B Gunnarsson	4	1
(Andorra) P Rodeiro Stetson (Andorra) J Jimenez-Guerra	1	2
4	(Cyprus) M Efstathiou (Cyprus) E Neos	6	6
(Montenegro) M Aleksić (Montenegro) R Cungu	w/o
2	(Luxembourg) A Knaff (Luxembourg) R Calzi

Semifinals
1	(Monaco) L Catarina (Monaco) R Arneodo	6	6
3	(Liechtenstein) V Leuch (Liechtenstein) T Kranz	0	1
4	(Cyprus) M Efstathiou (Cyprus) E Neos	6	6
(Montenegro) M Aleksić (Montenegro) R Cungu	1	3

Gold medal match
1	(Monaco) L Catarina (Monaco) R Arneodo	1	5
4	(Cyprus) M Efstathiou (Cyprus) E Neos	6	7

== Women's doubles ==
Quarterfinals	Semifinals				Gold medal match
	1	(Cyprus) E Louka (Cyprus) R Șerban	6	7
		(Luxembourg) E Molinaro (Luxembourg) C Schaul	3	5
					1	(Cyprus) E Louka (Cyprus) R Șerban	6	6
(Malta) F Curmi (Malta) E Genovese						(Malta) F Curmi (Malta) E Genovese	2	3
(Iceland) H Brynjarsdóttir (Iceland) A Grönholm		(Malta) F Curmi (Malta) E Genovese	6	7
	2	(Montenegro) V Babić (Montenegro) A Drašković	3	6

== Mixed doubles ==
Quarterfinals
1	(Cyprus) R Șerban (Cyprus) E Neos	6	6
(Andorra) V Kasintseva (Andorra) J Jiménez-Guerra	4	3
(Luxembourg) E Molinaro (Luxembourg) U Nastasi	6	6
(Liechtenstein) S Zünd (Liechtenstein) T Kranz	2	4
(Malta) E Genovese (Malta) M Asciak	1^{r}
(Monaco) D Petroula (Monaco) F Diep	5
(Iceland) A Grönholm (Iceland) R Bonifacius
2	(Montenegro) V Babić (Montenegro) R Cungu	w/o

Semifinals
1	(Cyprus) R Șerban (Cyprus) E Neos	3	6	[12]
(Luxembourg) E Molinaro (Luxembourg) U Nastasi	6	3	[10]
(Monaco) D Petroula (Monaco) F Diep	2	6
2	(Montenegro) V Babić (Montenegro) R Cungu	6	7

Gold medal match
1	(Cyprus) R Șerban (Cyprus) E Neos	6	3	[10]
2	(Montenegro) V Babić (Montenegro) R Cungu	4	6	[7]
