= Lucas Catarina =

Monegasque tennis player (born 1996)

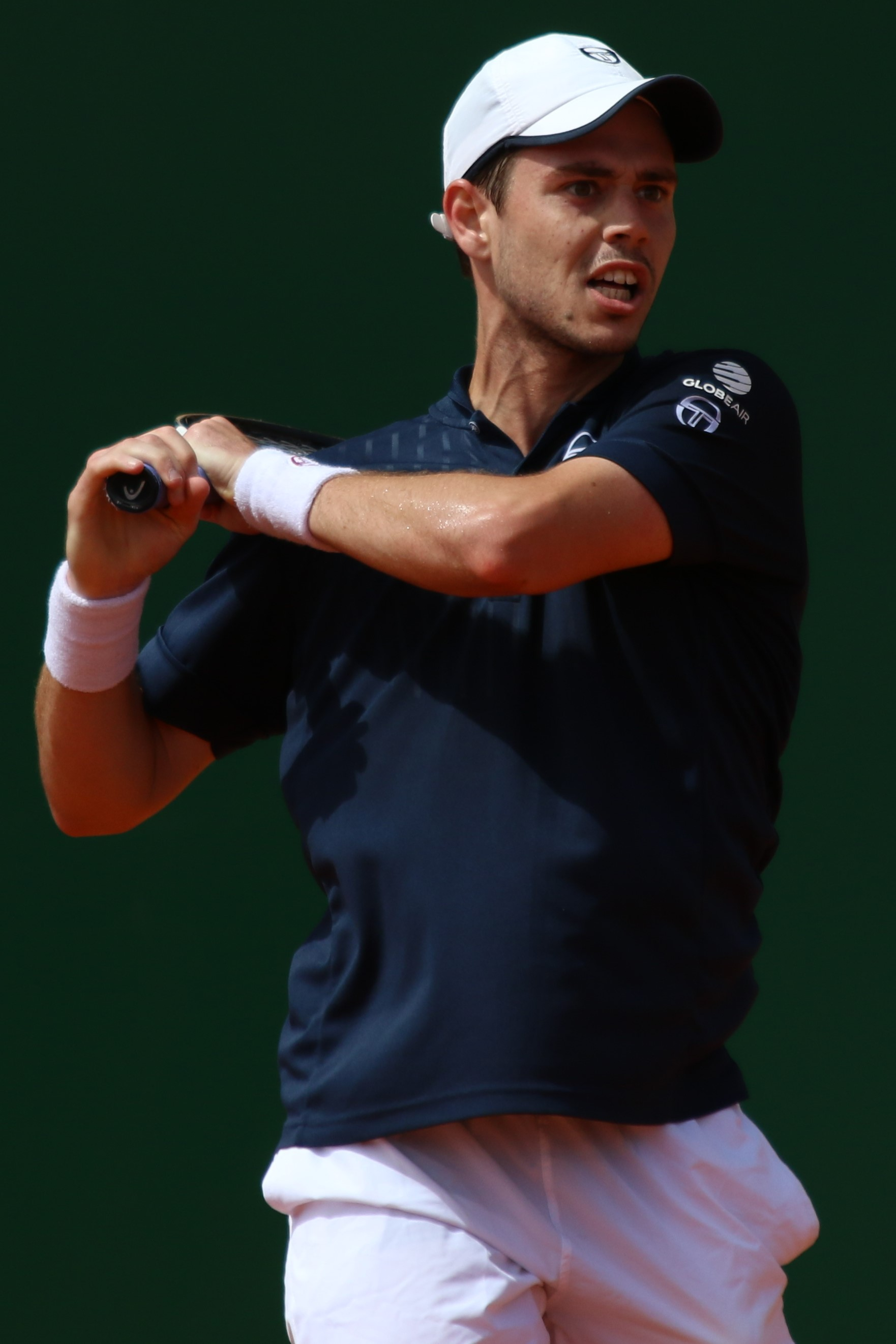
- Catarina at the 2022 Monte-Carlo Masters
- Country (sports): Monaco
- Residence: Monte Carlo, Monaco
- Born: 26 August 1996 (age 29) Monte Carlo, Monaco
- Height: 185 cm (6 ft 1 in)
- Retired: 2025
- Plays: Right-handed (two-handed backhand)
- Coach: Guillaume Couillard
- Prize money: $223,908

Singles
- Career record: 5–8 (at ATP Tour level, Grand Slam level, and in Davis Cup)
- Career titles: 0
- Highest ranking: No. 341 (11 June 2018)

Doubles
- Career record: 0–0 (at ATP Tour level, Grand Slam level, and in Davis Cup)
- Career titles: 0
- Highest ranking: No. 526 (27 May 2019)
Medal record
Representing Monaco
Mediterranean Games
Silver medal – second place	2018 Tarragona	Singles
Games of the Small States of Europe
Silver medal – second place	2019 Budva	Doubles
Silver medal – second place	2023 Malta	Singles
Bronze medal – third place	2017 City of San Marino	Singles
Bronze medal – third place	2023 Malta	Doubles

Lucas Catarina (born 26 August 1996) is a former Monégasque tennis player.

Catarina has a career-high ATP singles ranking of No. 341 achieved on 11 June 2018. He also has a career-high ATP doubles ranking of No. 526 achieved on 27 May 2019. He has won twelve singles along with two doubles titles on the ITF pro circuit tour.

Catarina represents Monaco in the Davis Cup. He defeated Latvian tennis player Rūdolfs Mednis in his first rubber.

== Career ==
He played his first ATP main-draw match in April 2018 at the Monte Carlo Masters after receiving a wildcard into the main draw. He lost against former world No. 3 Milos Raonic. Also in 2018, he won the singles silver medal at the Mediterranean Games.

== Challenger and Futures/World Tennis Tour finals ==
=== Singles: 25 (13–12) ===
Legend (singles) Challenger Tour (0–0) Futures/World Tennis Tour (13–12)	Finals by surface Hard (12–9) Clay (1–3) Grass (0–0)

Result	W–L	Date	Tournament	Tier	Surface	Opponent	Score
Loss	0–1	Jun 2017	F1 Harare, Zimbabwe	Futures	Hard	(South Africa) Nicolaas Scholtz	6–2, 3–6, 0–6
Win	1–1	Jul 2017	F12 Idanha-a-Nova, Portugal	Futures	Hard	(Spain) David Pérez Sanz	6–4, 6–4
Win	2–1	Jul 2017	F28 Erzurum, Turkey	Futures	Hard	(Turkey) Anil Yüksel	6–3, 6–3
Win	3–1	Dec 2017	F8 Cancún, Mexico	Futures	Hard	(Ecuador) Gonzalo Escobar	6–4, 7–6^{(7–2)}
Loss	3–2	May 2018	F1 Sozopol, Bulgaria	Futures	Hard	(France) Sebastien Boltz	3–6, 4–6
Win	4–2	Jan 2019	M15 Monastir, Tunisia	World Tennis Tour	Hard	(Tunisia) Skander Mansouri	6–4, 7–5
Win	5–2	Jan 2020	M15 Monastir, Tunisia	World Tennis Tour	Hard	(Russia) Boris Pokotilov	4–6, 6–3, 6–3
Win	6–2	Feb 2020	M15 Monastir, Tunisia	World Tennis Tour	Hard	(Portugal) Tiago Cação	6–0, 4–6, 7–5
Loss	6–3	Mar 2020	M15 Heraklion, Greece	World Tennis Tour	Hard	(Romania) Filip Cristian Jianu	5–7, 6–3, 3–6
Win	7–3	Sep 2020	M15 Castelo Branco, Portugal	World Tennis Tour	Hard	(United States) Strong Kirchheimer	6–3, 2–6, 7–6^{(13–11)}
Loss	7–4	Nov 2020	M15 Heraklion, Greece	World Tennis Tour	Hard	(France) Evan Furness	1–6, 6–2, 5–7
Loss	7–5	Nov 2020	M15 Heraklion, Greece	World Tennis Tour	Hard	(France) Evan Furness	3–6, 6–4, 1–6
Win	8–5	Mar 2021	M15 Monastir, Tunisia	World Tennis Tour	Hard	(Brazil) Mateus Alves	6–7^{(3–7)}, 7–5, 6–4
Loss	8–6	Apr 2021	M25 Angers, France	World Tennis Tour	Clay (i)	(France) Manuel Guinard	5–7, 4–6
Win	9–6	Apr 2021	M15 Monastir, Tunisia	World Tennis Tour	Hard	(France) Benjamin Pietri	6–0, 6–0
Loss	9–7	May 2021	M15 Monastir, Tunisia	World Tennis Tour	Hard	(Italy) Luca Potenza	6–1, 2–6, 1–6
Win	10–7	Mar 2022	M15 Monastir, Tunisia	World Tennis Tour	Hard	(France) Térence Atmane	6–4, 6–1
Loss	10–8	Apr 2022	M25 Angers, France	World Tennis Tour	Clay (i)	(France) Titouan Droguet	1–6, 1–6
Loss	10–9	Jan 2023	M15 Monastir, Tunisia	World Tennis Tour	Hard	Bogdan Bobrov	4–6, 5–7
Loss	10–10	Jan 2023	M15 Bagnoles-de-l'Orne, France	World Tennis Tour	Clay	(France) Sean Cuenin	3–6, 3–6
Loss	10–11	Feb 2023	M15 Monastir, Tunisia	World Tennis Tour	Hard	(Italy) Lorenzo Rottoli	6–2, 4–6, 4–6
Loss	10–12	Feb 2023	M15 Monastir, Tunisia	World Tennis Tour	Hard	(Poland) Maks Kaśnikowski	4–6, 0–6
Win	11–12	Mar 2023	M15 Heraklion, Greece	World Tennis Tour	Hard	(France) François Musitelli	6–3, 6–2
Win	12–12	Mar 2023	M15 Heraklion, Greece	World Tennis Tour	Hard	(Romania) Sebastian Gima	6–3, 6–2
Win	13–12	May 2023	M15 Kalmar, Sweden	World Tennis Tour	Clay	(Sweden) Max Dahlin	6–1, 3–6, 7–6^{(14–12)}

=== Doubles: 3 (2–1) ===
Legend (doubles) Challenger Tour (0–0) Futures Tour (2–1)	Finals by surface Hard (1–1) Clay (1–0) Grass (0–0)

Result	W–L	Date	Tournament	Tier	Surface	Partner	Opponents	Score
Win	1–0	Sep 2017	F5 Roehampton, Great Britain	Futures	Hard	(Switzerland) Adrian Bodmer	(Republic of Ireland) Peter Bothwell (United Kingdom) Luke Johnson	6–2, 6–2
Loss	1–1	Oct 2018	F6 Heraklion, Greece	Futures	Hard	(France) Baptiste Crepatte	(Italy) Francesco Ferrari (Greece) Michail Pervolarakis	6–7^{(4–7)}, 0–6
Win	2–1	Sep 2019	M15 Pajulahti, Finland	World Tennis Tour	Clay (i)	(France) Baptiste Crepatte	(Netherlands) Jesper de Jong (Netherlands) Ryan Nijboer	6–4, 1–6, [10–5]
