= Eléonora Molinaro =

Luxembourgish tennis player

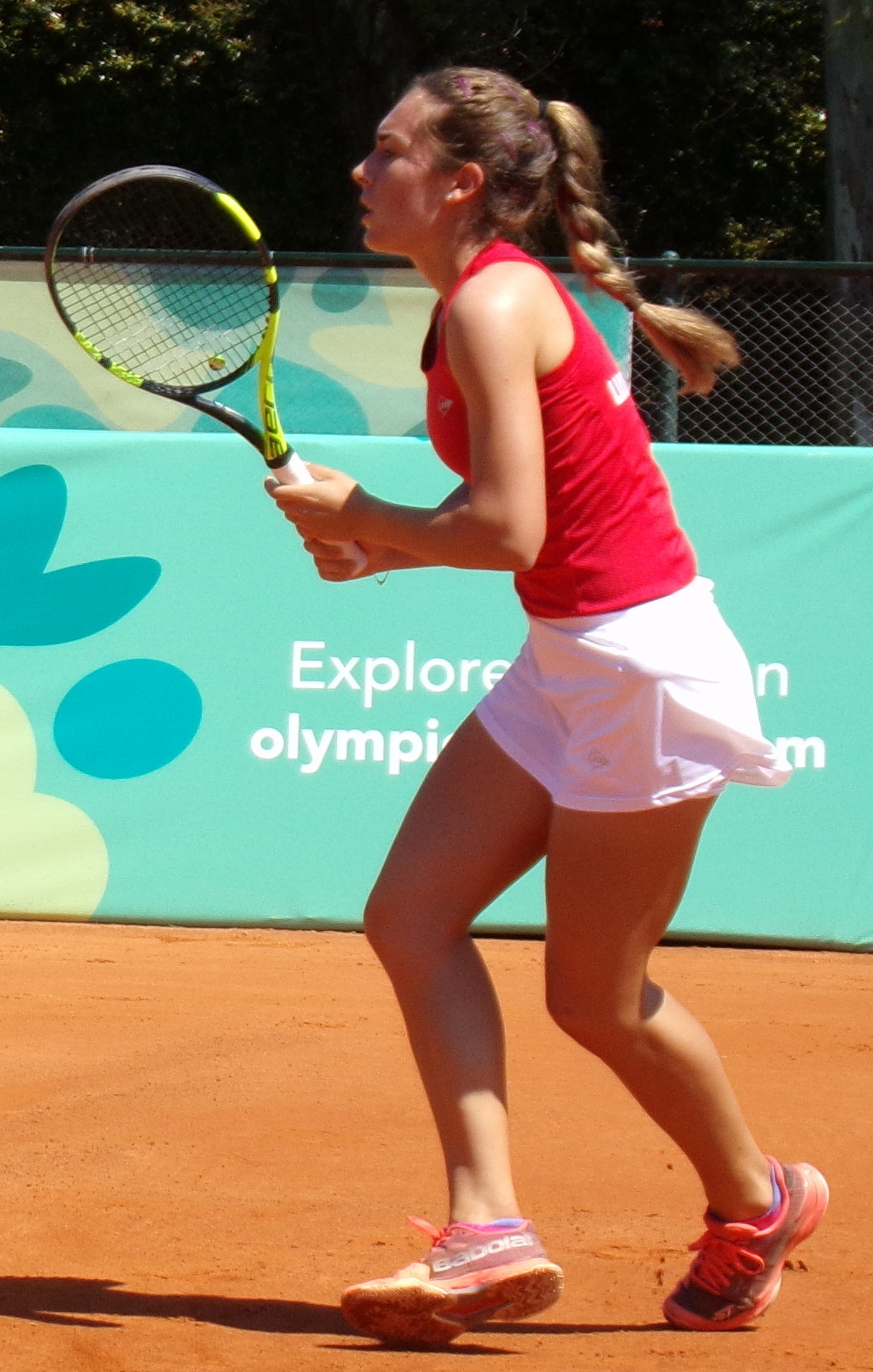
- Molinaro at the 2018 Summer Youth Olympics
- Full name: Eléonora Anne-Sophie Rbis Molinaro Simon
- Country (sports): Luxembourg
- Born: 4 September 2000 (age 25) Luxembourg City
- Plays: Right (two-handed backhand)
- Prize money: $61,535

Singles
- Career record: 144–70
- Career titles: 8 ITF
- Highest ranking: No. 234 (9 March 2020)

Doubles
- Career record: 43–44
- Highest ranking: No. 473 (3 February 2020)

Team competitions
- Fed Cup: 25–16
Medal record
Representing Luxembourg
Games of the Small States of Europe
| Gold medal – first place | 2015 Reykjavik | Doubles |
| Gold medal – first place | 2017 San Marino | Mixed doubles |
| Silver medal – second place | 2017 San Marino | Singles |

Eléonora Anne-Sophie Rubis Molinaro Simon (born 4 September 2000) is an inactive Luxembourgish tennis player.

== Career overview ==
Molinaro started playing tennis aged seven.

Having started the year with a WTA ranking of 822, she reached the final of the first ten tournaments she played in 2018, winning two out of four finals on the ITF Circuit and four out of six at the junior level. This resulted in her cracking the top 500 for the first time in March and being seeded sixth in her first appearance in a junior Grand Slam tournament at the French Open. She reached the quarterfinals before bowing out to eventual champion Coco Gauff.

Molinaro played at the Tennessee Volunteers between 2020 and 2024 in the NCAA tennis championships. In September of 2025 Louisiana Tech appointed Molinaro the new assistant coach.

Playing for Luxembourg Fed Cup team, she has win–loss records of 19–9 in singles and 6–7 in doubles.

== ITF Circuit finals ==
=== Singles: 12 (8 titles, 4 runner-ups) ===
| Legend $25,000 tournaments $15,000 tournaments | Finals by surface Hard (0–1) Clay (8–3) |

| Result | W–L | Date | Tournament | Tier | Surface | Opponent | Score |
|---|---|---|---|---|---|---|---|
| Win | 1–0 | Jan 2018 | ITF Antalya, Turkey | 15,000 | Clay | (Russia) Vlada Koval | 6–3, 6–1 |
| Loss | 1–1 | Feb 2018 | Open de l'Isère, France | 25,000 | Hard (i) | (France) Fiona Ferro | 4–6, 7–6^{(5)}, 6–7^{(3)} |
| Loss | 1–2 | Mar 2018 | ITF Amiens, France | 15,000 | Clay (i) | (Ukraine) Katarina Zavatska | 1–6, 2–6 |
| Win | 2–2 | Mar 2018 | ITF Gonesse, France | 15,000 | Clay (i) | (France) Marine Partaud | 6–2, 6–1 |
| Loss | 2–3 | Mar 2019 | ITF Antalya, Turkey | 15,000 | Clay | (Ukraine) Maryna Chernyshova | 4–6, 4–6 |
| Win | 3–3 | Mar 2019 | ITF Gonesse, France | 15,000 | Clay (i) | (Spain) Rebeka Masarova | 6–2, 2–6, 6–4 |
| Win | 4–3 | May 2019 | ITF Antalya, Turkey | 15,000 | Clay | (Turkey) Zeynep Sönmez | 7–5, 6–4 |
| Win | 5–3 | May 2019 | ITF Antalya, Turkey | 15,000 | Clay | (Algeria) Inès Ibbou | 6–2, 6–4 |
| Win | 6–3 | Jul 2019 | Open Porte du Hainaut, France | 25,000 | Clay | (Germany) Katharina Hobgarski | 6–4, 1–6, 6–3 |
| Win | 7–3 | Sep 2019 | ITF Brno, Czech Republic | 25,000 | Clay | (Italy) Federica di Sarra | 6–4, 6–3 |
| Loss | 7–4 | Feb 2020 | Open de l'Isère, France | 25,000 | Hard (i) | (France) Clara Burel | 7–5, 5–7, 2–6 |
| Win | 8–4 | Mar 2020 | ITF Antalya, Turkey | 15,000 | Clay | (Turkey) Zeynep Sönmez | 6–2, 6–2 |

=== Doubles: 4 (4 runner-ups) ===
| Legend $25,000 tournaments $15,000 tournaments | Finals by surface Hard (0–1) Clay (0–3) (Note: Final was cancelled due to the Hurricane Ian) |

| Result | W–L | Date | Tournament | Tier | Surface | Partner | Opponents | Score |
|---|---|---|---|---|---|---|---|---|
| Loss | 0–1 | Jul 2018 | ITF Schio, Italy | 15,000 | Clay | (Switzerland) Jessica Crivelletto | (Italy) Costanza Traversi (Italy) Aurora Zantedeschi | 6–7^{(5)}, 6–7^{(4)} |
| Loss | 0–2 | Jan 2019 | ITF Stuttgart, Germany | 15,000 | Hard (i) | (Latvia) Daniela Vismane | (Romania) Laura Ioana Paar (Germany) Julia Wachaczyk | 5–7, 0–6 |
| Loss | 0–3 | Mar 2019 | ITF Le Havre, France | 15,000 | Clay (i) | (Switzerland) Svenja Ochsner | (Germany) Tayisiya Morderger (Germany) Yana Morderger | 4–6, 3–6 |
| Loss | 0–4 | May 2019 | ITF Antalya, Turkey | 15,000 | Clay | (Russia) Yulia Kulikova | (Turkey) Cemre Anıl (United States) Dasha Ivanova | 3–6, 5–7 |
| Finalist | – | Oct 2022 | ITF Hilton Head, United States | 15,000 | Clay | (Poland) Daria Kuczer | (United States) Paris Corley (United States) Lexington Reed | canc. |
