= 2026 Angola Ladies Open – Singles =

Singles
- 2026 Angola Ladies Open

Final
- Champion: Sofya Lansere
- Runner-up: (France) Anna Blinkova
- Score: 5–7, 6–1, 6–4

Details
- Draw: 32 (4Q / 4WC)
- Seeds: 8

Events
Singles	Doubles
- Angola Ladies Open

Sofya Lansere won the title, defeating Anna Blinkova 5–7, 6–1, 6–4 in the final.

This was the first edition of the tournament.

== Seeds ==
1. (France) Anna Blinkova (final)
2. (Germany) Noma Noha Akugue (semifinals)
3. (Poland) Martyna Kubka (quarterfinals)
4. (Netherlands) Suzan Lamens (first round)
5. (Lithuania) Justina Mikulskytė (quarterfinals)
6. (Morocco) Yasmine Kabbaj (quarterfinals)
7. (Poland) Linda Klimovičová (first round)
8. Sofya Lansere (champion)

== Draw ==
Key

- Q = Qualifier
- WC = Wild card
- LL = Lucky loser
- Alt = Alternate
- ITF = ITF entry
- PR = Protected ranking
- SR = Special ranking
- SE = Special exempt
- JE = Junior exempt
- JR = Junior Accelerator Programme entrant
- CO = College Accelerator Programme entrant
- NG = Next Gen Accelerator Program entrant
- w/o = Walkover
- r = Retired
- d = Defaulted

=== Finals ===
Semifinals
1	(France) Anna Blinkova	5	6	6
(Poland) Gina Feistel	7	4	2
8	Sofya Lansere	7^{8}	6
2	(Germany) Noma Noha Akugue	6^{6}	2

Final
1	(France) Anna Blinkova	7	1	4
8	Sofya Lansere	5	6	6

=== Top half ===
First round
1	(France) A Blinkova	6	6
WC	(Algeria) F Heddar	2	1
(China) Z Li	6	6
Q	(Mexico) AS Sánchez	2	4
(France) D Martynov	7	6
(Egypt) S Samir	5	2
WC	(South Africa) J van Zyl	5	2
6	(Morocco) Y Kabbaj	7	6
4	(Netherlands) S Lamens	2	4
K Kroitor	6	6
WC	(Egypt) J Ibrahim	0	3
K Zaytseva	6	6
(Bulgaria) I Shinikova	6	6
(France) D Vaissaud	0	1
(Poland) G Feistel	7^{7}	5	6
7	(Poland) L Klimovičová	6^{2}	7	4

Second round
1	(France) A Blinkova	6	4	6
(China) Z Li	3	6	2
(France) D Martynov	2	1
6	(Morocco) Y Kabbaj	6	6
K Kroitor	4	1
K Zaytseva	6	6
(Bulgaria) I Shinikova	2	3
(Poland) G Feistel	6	6

Quarterfinals
1	(France) A Blinkova	6	2	6
6	(Morocco) Y Kabbaj	2	6	4
K Zaytseva	1	5
(Poland) G Feistel	6	7

Semifinals
1	(France) A Blinkova	5	6	6
(Poland) G Feistel	7	4	2

=== Bottom half ===
First round
8	S Lansere	6	7
(Kenya) A Okutoyi	0	5
(South Africa) Wa Mdlulwa	1	3
(Slovenia) K Novak	6	6
Q	(Germany) F Sziedat	3	6	6
(Burundi) S Nahimana	6	4	2
Q	(Serbia) D Suvirdjonkova	3	1
3	(Poland) M Kubka	6	6
5	(Lithuania) J Mikulskytė	7	7
(Israel) M Laron	5	5
(France) T Lemaître	6	6
WC	(Egypt) L Alhussein Abdel Aziz	1	1
Q	(Germany) L Böhner	6^{4}	6	0
LL	(India) M Sawant	7^{7}	4	6
(South Africa) Wo Mdlulwa	2	0
2	(Germany) N Noha Akugue	6	6

Second round
8	S Lansere	6	6
(Slovenia) K Novak	0	1
Q	(Germany) F Sziedat	3	3
3	(Poland) M Kubka	6	6
5	(Lithuania) J Mikulskytė	6	7
(France) T Lemaître	3	5
LL	(India) M Sawant	2	0
2	(Germany) N Noha Akugue	6	6

Quarterfinals
8	S Lansere	7^{7}	7
3	(Poland) M Kubka	6^{4}	5
5	(Lithuania) J Mikulskytė	2	3
2	(Germany) N Noha Akugue	6	6

Semifinals
8	S Lansere	7^{8}	6
2	(Germany) N Noha Akugue	6^{6}	2

== Qualifying ==
=== Seeds ===
1. (Mexico) Ana Sofía Sánchez (qualified)
2. (Germany) Franziska Sziedat (qualified)
3. (Serbia) Darja Suvirdjonkova (qualified)
4. (Germany) Laura Böhner (qualified)
5. (India) Madhurima Sawant (qualifying competition, lucky loser)
6. (Netherlands) Emma van Poppel (qualifying competition)
7. (India) Ashmitha Easwaramurthi (first round)
8. (India) Saumya Vig (first round)

=== Qualifiers ===
1. (Mexico) Ana Sofía Sánchez
2. (Germany) Franziska Sziedat
3. (Serbia) Darja Suvirdjonkova
4. (Germany) Laura Böhner

=== Lucky loser ===
1. (India) Madhurima Sawant

=== Draw ===
==== First qualifier ====
First round				Qualifying competition
				1	(Mexico) Ana Sofía Sánchez	6	6
				WC	(South Africa) Abigayel Vosloo	1	1
WC	(South Africa) Abigayel Vosloo	6	6	WC	(South Africa) Abigayel Vosloo	1	1
8	(India) Saumya Vig	2	0

==== Second qualifier ====
Qualifying competition
2	(Germany) Franziska Sziedat	6	6
5	(India) Madhurima Sawant	2	2

==== Third qualifier ====
Qualifying competition
3	(Serbia) Darja Suvirdjonkova	4	7^{7}	6
6	(Netherlands) Emma van Poppel	6	6^{5}	2

==== Fourth qualifier ====
First round				Qualifying competition
				4	(Germany) Laura Böhner	6	6
					(India) Prathyusha Rachapudi	2	3
	(India) Prathyusha Rachapudi	6	7		(India) Prathyusha Rachapudi	2	3
7	(India) Ashmitha Easwaramurthi	2	5
