= Nina Kalezić =

Montenegrin tennis player

- Country (sports): Montenegro
- Born: 5 December 1996 (age 28); Podgorica, Federal Republic of Yugoslavia
- Prize money: $1,011

Singles
- Career record: 8–15
- Career titles: 0

Doubles
- Career record: 2–4
- Career titles: 0
- Highest ranking: No. 761 (9 May 2016)

Team competitions
- Fed Cup: 0–8
- Last updated on: 11 November 2020.

Nina Kalezić (born 5 December 1996) is a Montenegrin former tennis player.

Kalezić has a career-high doubles ranking world No. 761, which she achieved on 9 May 2016.

Playing for Montenegro Fed Cup team, she has a win–loss record of 0–8.

== ITF Circuit finals ==
=== Doubles (0–1) ===
Legend $25,000 tournaments $15,000 tournaments	Finals by surface Hard (0–0) Clay (0–1)

Result	W–L	Date	Tournament	Tier	Surface	Partner	Opponents	Score
Loss	0–1	Sep 2015	Royal Cup, Montenegro	25,000	Clay	(Montenegro) Nikoleta Bulatović	(North Macedonia) Lina Gjorcheska (Turkey) Melis Sezer	0–6, 0–6

== National representation ==
=== Fed Cup ===
Kalezić made her Fed Cup debut for Montenegro in 2014, while the team was competing in the Europe/Africa Zone Group II, when she was 17 years and 132 days old.

==== Fed Cup ====
Group membership World Group (0–0) World Group Play-off World Group II World Group II Play-off Europe/Africa Group (0–8)	Matches by surface Hard (0–5) Clay (0–3) Grass (0–0) Carpet (0–0)	Matches by type Singles (0–5) Doubles (0–3)	Matches by setting Indoors (0–5) Outdoors (0–3)

===== Singles (0–5) =====
Edition	Stage	Date	Location	Against	Surface	Opponent	W/L	Score
2014 Fed Cup; Europe/Africa Zone Group II	Pool A	16 April 2014	Šiauliai, Lithuania	Liechtenstein	Hard (i)	Kathinka von Deichmann	L	1–6, 0–6
2014 Fed Cup; Europe/Africa Zone Group II	Pool A	18 April 2014	Šiauliai, Lithuania	Lithuania	Hard (i)	Lina Stančiūtė	L	1–6, 1–6
2014 Fed Cup; Europe/Africa Zone Group II	Relegation Play-off	19 April 2014	Šiauliai, Lithuania	South Africa	Hard (i)	Natasha Fourouclas	L	1–6, 0–6
2015 Fed Cup; Europe/Africa Zone Group III	Pool B	16 April 2015	Ulcinj, Montenegro	Greece	Clay	Valentini Grammatikopoulou	L	1–6, 1–6
2015 Fed Cup; Europe/Africa Zone Group III	9th-12th Play-off	17 April 2015	Ulcinj, Montenegro	Algeria	Clay	Amira Benaïssa	L	7–5, 5–7, 1–6

===== Doubles (0–3) =====
Edition	Stage	Date	Location	Against	Surface	Partner	Opponents	W/L	Score
2014 Fed Cup; Europe/Africa Zone Group II	Pool A	16 April 2014	Šiauliai, Lithuania	Lithuania	Hard (i)	Nikoleta Bulatović	Agnė Čepelytė; Justina Mikulskytė	L	0–6, 2–6
2014 Fed Cup; Europe/Africa Zone Group II	Relegation Play-off	19 April 2014	Šiauliai, Lithuania	South Africa	Hard (i)	Nikoleta Bulatović	Natasha Fourouclas; Natalie Grandin	L	3–6, 1–6
2015 Fed Cup; Europe/Africa Zone Group III	Pool B	16 April 2015	Ulcinj, Montenegro	Greece	Clay	Kristina Samardžić	Eleni Daniilidou; Despina Papamichail	L	1–6, 1–6
