= 2026 Angola Ladies Open =

- Date: 2–8 November
- Edition: 1st
- Category: WTA 125
- Draw: 32S / 14D
- Prize money: $115,000
- Surface: Hard
- Location: Luanda, Angola
- Venue: Kikuxi Tennis Academy

Champions

Singles
- Sofya Lansere

Doubles
- (Burundi) Sada Nahimana / (Kenya) Angella Okutoyi
- Angola Ladies Open

The 2026 Angola Ladies Open was a professional women's tennis tournament played on outdoor hardcourts. It was the 1st edition of this WTA 125 tournament, which was part of the 2026 WTA 125 Circuit. It took place at the Kikuxi Tennis Academy in Luanda, Angola, from 2 to 8 November 2026.

== Singles main draw entrants ==
=== Seeds ===
Country	Player	Rank^{†}	Seed
FRA	Anna Blinkova	73	1
GER	Noma Noha Akugue	126	2
POL	Martyna Kubka	148	3
NED	Suzan Lamens	225	4
LTU	Justina Mikulskytė	234	5
MAR	Yasmine Kabbaj	254	6
POL	Linda Klimovičová	264	7
	Sofya Lansere	265	8

^{†} Ranking are as of 26 October 2026.

=== Other entrants ===
The following players received wildcards into the singles main draw:

- (Egypt) Lamis Alhussein Abdel Aziz
- (Algeria) Farah Heddar
- (Egypt) Jian Ibrahim
- (South Africa) Jahnie van Zyl

The following players received entry from the qualifying draw:

- (Germany) Laura Böhner
- (Mexico) Ana Sofía Sánchez
- (Serbia) Darja Suvirdjonkova
- (Germany) Franziska Sziedat

The following player received entry as a lucky loser:

- (India) Madhurima Sawant

=== Withdrawals ===
Before the tournament

- (France) Clara Burel → replaced by (South Africa) Wozuko Mdululwa
- (United Kingdom) Alicia Dudeney → replaced by (South Africa) Warona Mdululwa
- (Canada) Ana Grubor → replaced by Kristina Kroitor
- Victoria Milovanova → replaced by (India) Madhurima Sawant
- Varvara Panshina → replaced by (Israel) Maayan Laron
- (Japan) Eri Shimizu → replaced by (France) Dune Vaissaud
- (Portugal) Angelina Voloshchuk → replaced by (Slovenia) Kristina Novak

== Doubles main draw entrants ==
=== Seeds ===
Country	Player	Country	Player	Rank^{1}	Seed
CHN	Li Zongyu	SLO	Kristina Novak	383	1
POL	Martyna Kubka	LTU	Justina Mikulskytė	413	2
MEX	Ana Sofía Sánchez		Ksenia Zaytseva	577	3
FRA	Tiphanie Lemaître	EGY	Sandra Samir	598	4

- ^{1} Rankings as of 26 October 2026.

=== Withdrawals ===
During the tournament

- (Algeria) Farah Heddar / (Netherlands) Emma van Poppel (Heddar – low back injury)
- (Israel) Maayan Laron / (India) Madhurima Sawant (Laron – gastrointestinal illness)

== Finals ==
=== Singles ===
- Sofya Lansere def. (France) Anna Blinkova 5–7, 6–1, 6–4

=== Doubles ===
- (Burundi) Sada Nahimana / (Kenya) Angella Okutoyi def. (Poland) Martyna Kubka / (Lithuania) Justina Mikulskytė 6–4, 6–4
