= 2024 Split Open – Women's singles =

Women's singles
- 2024 Split Open

Final
- Champion: (Croatia) Jana Fett
- Runner-up: (Turkey) İpek Öz
- Score: 6–0, 6–4

Events
Singles	men	women
Doubles	men	women
← 2023 ·	Split Open	· 2025 →

Tara Würth was the defending champion but lost in the first round to Tena Lukas.

Jana Fett won the title, defeating İpek Öz in the final, 6–0, 6–4.

== Seeds ==
1. (Austria) Julia Grabher (first round)
2. (Croatia) Jana Fett (champion)
3. (Hungary) Panna Udvardy (semifinals)
4. (Switzerland) Simona Waltert (second round)
5. (Slovenia) Veronika Erjavec (quarterfinals)
6. (France) Carole Monnet (first round)
7. (Croatia) Tena Lukas (second round)
8. (Slovenia) Polona Hercog (second round)

== Draw ==
=== Key ===
- Q = Qualifier
- WC = Wild card
- LL = Lucky loser
- Alt = Alternate
- SE = Special exempt
- PR = Protected ranking
- ITF = ITF entry
- JE = Junior exempt
- w/o = Walkover
- r = Retired
- d = Defaulted
- SR = Special ranking

=== Finals ===
Semifinals
Q	(Germany) Stephanie Wagner	4	3
(Turkey) İpek Öz	6	6
3	(Hungary) Panna Udvardy	1	0
2	(Croatia) Jana Fett	6	6

Final
(Turkey) İpek Öz	0	4
2	(Croatia) Jana Fett	6	6

=== Top half ===
First round
1	(Austria) J Grabher	3	4
Q	(Slovenia) P Lovrič	6	6
Q	(Germany) S Wagner	6	6
(Liechtenstein) K von Deichmann	3	1
(Sweden) R Peterson	6	7^{8}
(Netherlands) L Pattinama Kerkhove	2	6^{6}
WC	(Croatia) T Würth	6	1	2
7	(Croatia) T Lukas	4	6	6
4	(Switzerland) S Waltert	6	4	7^{10}
(United States) L Chirico	4	6	6^{8}
(Turkey) İ Öz	6	6
(Serbia) D Radanović	4	4
Q	(Czech Republic) B Palicová	6	6
WC	(Hungary) N Szabanin	1	4
Q	(Germany) L Papadakis	2	3
8/SR	(Slovenia) P Hercog	6	6

Second round
Q	(Slovenia) P Lovrič	2	1
Q	(Germany) S Wagner	6	6
(Sweden) R Peterson	7^{7}	6
7	(Croatia) T Lukas	6^{1}	1
4	(Switzerland) S Waltert	6	3	5
(Turkey) İ Öz	1	6	7
Q	(Czech Republic) B Palicová	7^{7}	7
8/SR	(Slovenia) P Hercog	6^{3}	5

Quarterfinals
Q	(Germany) S Wagner	6	6
(Sweden) R Peterson	3	1
(Turkey) İ Öz	7^{7}	6
Q	(Czech Republic) B Palicová	6^{5}	3

Semifinals
Q	(Germany) S Wagner	4	3
(Turkey) İ Öz	6	6

=== Bottom half ===
First round
6	(France) C Monnet	1	1
(Greece) V Grammatikopoulou	6	6
WC	(Croatia) I Primorac	6	1	3
Q	V Miroshnichenko	4	6	6
(Croatia) L Bošković	7^{7}	6
Q	(Turkey) B Cengiz	6^{4}	1
WC	(Croatia) L Ivković	0	4
3	(Hungary) P Udvardy	6	6
5	(Slovenia) V Erjavec	6	6
Q	(Czech Republic) J Malečková	2	3
SR	(Germany) N Schunk	2	3
(North Macedonia) L Gjorcheska	6	6
(Lithuania) J Mikulskytė	6	6
Q	(Germany) J Middendorf	2	3
(Uzbekistan) N Abduraimova	3	2
2	(Croatia) J Fett	6	6

Second round
(Greece) V Grammatikopoulou	6	6
Q	V Miroshnichenko	2	1
(Croatia) L Bošković	2	3
3	(Hungary) P Udvardy	6	6
5	(Slovenia) V Erjavec	6	6
(North Macedonia) L Gjorcheska	2	1
(Lithuania) J Mikulskytė	1	4
2	(Croatia) J Fett	6	6

Quarterfinals
(Greece) V Grammatikopoulou	1	6	4
3	(Hungary) P Udvardy	6	4	6
5	(Slovenia) V Erjavec	3	6	0
2	(Croatia) J Fett	6	3	6

Semifinals
3	(Hungary) P Udvardy	1	0
2	(Croatia) J Fett	6	6
