= 2024 Split Open – Women's doubles =

Women's doubles
- 2024 Split Open

Final
- Champions: (Greece) Valentini Grammatikopoulou (India) Prarthana Thombare
- Runners-up: (Slovenia) Veronika Erjavec (Lithuania) Justina Mikulskytė
- Score: 6–4, 6–1

Events
Singles	men	women
Doubles	men	women
← 2023 ·	Split Open	· 2025 →

Veronika Erjavec and Lina Gjorcheska were the defending champions but Gjorcheska chose not to participate.

Erjavec partnered alongside Justina Mikulskytė, but lost in the final to Valentini Grammatikopoulou and Prarthana Thombare, 4–6, 1–6.

== Seeds ==
1. (Greece) Valentini Grammatikopoulou / (India) Prarthana Thombare (champion)
2. (Slovenia) Veronika Erjavec / (Lithuania) Justina Mikulskytė (final)
3. (Poland) Maja Chwalińska / (Czech Republic) Jesika Malečková (semifinals)
4. (France) Estelle Cascino / (France) Carole Monnet (semifinals)

== Draw ==
=== Key ===
- Q = Qualifier
- WC = Wild card
- LL = Lucky loser
- Alt = Alternate
- SE = Special exempt
- PR = Protected ranking
- ITF = ITF entry
- JE = Junior exempt
- w/o = Walkover
- r = Retired
- d = Defaulted
- SR = Special ranking

First round
1	(Greece) V Grammatikopoulou (India) P Thombare	6	7^{8}
(Uzbekistan) N Abduraimova; V Miroshnichenko	4	6^{6}
(United States) A Rogers (Australia) O Tjandramulia	6	6
WC	V Borodulina (Montenegro) T Nikčević	2	3
4	(France) E Cascino (France) C Monnet	7^{7}	6
(Turkey) B Cengiz (Turkey) İ Öz	6^{4}	1
WC	(Croatia) I Primorac (Serbia) D Radanović	4	6	[10]
(Bosnia and Herzegovina) D Herdželaš (Croatia) T Lukas	6	2	[4]
(Slovenia) N Radišić (Croatia) T Würth	6	6
WC	(Croatia) R Derniković (Croatia) K Roso	2	1
(Netherlands) L Pattinama Kerkhove (Liechtenstein) K von Deichmann	3	2
3	(Poland) M Chwalińska (Czech Republic) J Malečková	6	6
(Germany) L Papadakis (Slovakia) R Zelníčková	6	7^{7}
(Croatia) M Dražić (India) V Shinde	3	6^{3}
(United Kingdom) S Murray Sharan (Hungary) P Udvardy	3	3
2	(Slovenia) V Erjavec (Lithuania) J Mikulskytė	6	6

Quarterfinals
1	(Greece) V Grammatikopoulou (India) P Thombare	7	6
(United States) A Rogers (Australia) O Tjandramulia	5	2
4	(France) E Cascino (France) C Monnet	6	6
WC	(Croatia) I Primorac (Serbia) D Radanović	3	2
(Slovenia) N Radišić (Croatia) T Würth	6	5	[11]
3	(Poland) M Chwalińska (Czech Republic) J Malečková	3	7	[13]
(Germany) L Papadakis (Slovakia) R Zelníčková	4	6^{2}
2	(Slovenia) V Erjavec (Lithuania) J Mikulskytė	6	7^{7}

Semifinals
1	(Greece) V Grammatikopoulou (India) P Thombare	6	7
4	(France) E Cascino (France) C Monnet	4	5
3	(Poland) M Chwalińska (Czech Republic) J Malečková	1	7^{7}	[5]
2	(Slovenia) V Erjavec (Lithuania) J Mikulskytė	6	6^{5}	[10]

Final
1	(Greece) V Grammatikopoulou (India) P Thombare	6	6
2	(Slovenia) V Erjavec (Lithuania) J Mikulskytė	4	1
