= 2014 Fed Cup Europe/Africa Zone Group II – Pool A =

International tennis competition

Group A of the 2014 Fed Cup Europe/Africa Zone Group II was one of two pools in the Europe/Africa zone of the 2014 Fed Cup. Four teams competed in a round robin competition, with the top team and the bottom team proceeding to their respective sections of the play-offs: the top team played for advancement to Group I, while the bottom team faced potential relegation to Group III.

== Standings ==
	(Finland) FIN	(Lithuania) LIT	(Montenegro) MNE	(Liechtenstein) LIE	RR; W–L	Match; W–L	Set; W–L	Game; W–L	Standings
Finland		2–1	3–0	0–3	2–1	6–3	13–7	100–72	2
Lithuania	1–2		3–0	3–0	1–2	5–4	10–9	88–73	3
Montenegro	0–3	0–3		0–3	0–3	0–9	0–18	19–108	4
Liechtenstein	2–1	2–1	3–0		3–0	7–2	16–5	113–66	1

== Round-robin ==
=== Finland vs. Lithuania ===
Finland
2
Šiauliai Tennis School, Šiauliai, Lithuania
16 April 2014
Hard (indoors)

Lithuania
1

			1	2	3
1	(Finland) (Lithuania)	Ella Leivo; Akvilė Paražinskaitė	6; 2	6; 0
2	(Finland) (Lithuania)	Piia Suomalainen; Lina Stančiūtė	4; 6	0; 6
3	(Finland) (Lithuania)	Ella Leivo / Piia Suomalainen; Justina Mikulskytė / Lina Stančiūtė	7^{7} 6^{4}	6; 3

=== Montenegro vs. Liechtenstein ===
Montenegro
0
Šiauliai Tennis School, Šiauliai, Lithuania
16 April 2014
Hard (indoors)

Liechtenstein
3

			1	2	3
1	(Montenegro) (Liechtenstein)	Nina Kalezić; Kathinka von Deichmann	1; 6	0; 6
2	(Montenegro) (Liechtenstein)	Tamara Bojanić; Stephanie Vogt	0; 6	1; 6
3	(Montenegro) (Liechtenstein)	Tamara Bojanić / Nikoleta Bulatović; Stephanie Vogt / Kathinka von Deichmann	0; 6	1; 6

=== Finland vs. Montenegro ===
Finland
3
Šiauliai Tennis School, Šiauliai, Lithuania
17 April 2014
Hard (indoors)

Montenegro
0

			1	2	3
1	(Finland) (Montenegro)	Ella Leivo; Nikoleta Bulatović	6; 2	6; 0
2	(Finland) (Montenegro)	Piia Suomalainen; Tamara Bojanić	7; 5	6; 2
3	(Finland) (Montenegro)	Ella Leivo / Roosa Timonen; Tamara Bojanić / Nikoleta Bulatović	6; 0	6; 0

=== Lithuania vs. Liechtenstein ===
Lithuania
1
Šiauliai Tennis School, Šiauliai, Lithuania
17 April 2014
Hard (indoors)

Liechtenstein
2

			1	2	3
1	(Lithuania) (Liechtenstein)	Akvilė Paražinskaitė; Kathinka von Deichmann	4; 6	2; 6
2	(Lithuania) (Liechtenstein)	Lina Stančiūtė; Stephanie Vogt	6^{7} 7^{9}	6; 2	6; 4
3	(Lithuania) (Liechtenstein)	Justina Mikulskytė / Akvilė Paražinskaitė; Stephanie Vogt / Kathinka von Deichmann	1; 6	4; 6

=== Finland vs. Liechtenstein ===
Finland
1
Šiauliai Tennis School, Šiauliai, Lithuania
18 April 2014
Hard (indoors)

Liechtenstein
2

			1	2	3
1	(Finland) (Liechtenstein)	Ella Leivo; Kathinka von Deichmann	4; 6	6; 1	7; 5
2	(Finland) (Liechtenstein)	Piia Suomalainen; Stephanie Vogt	2; 6	6; 3	1; 6
3	(Finland) (Liechtenstein)	Ella Leivo / Piia Suomalainen; Stephanie Vogt / Kathinka von Deichmann	3; 6	5; 7

=== Lithuania vs. Montenegro ===
Lithuania
3
Šiauliai Tennis School, Šiauliai, Lithuania
18 April 2014
Hard (indoors)

Montenegro
0

			1	2	3
1	(Lithuania) (Montenegro)	Akvilė Paražinskaitė; Nikoleta Bulatović	6; 0	6; 3
2	(Lithuania) (Montenegro)	Lina Stančiūtė; Nina Kalezić	6; 1	6; 1
3	(Lithuania) (Montenegro)	Agnė Čepelytė / Justina Mikulskytė; Nikoleta Bulatović / Nina Kalezić	6; 0	6; 2
