= 2024 Split Open =

Tennis tournament

- Date: 1–6 April 2024 (women); 8–14 April 2024 (men)
- Edition: 6th (men); 3rd (women)
- Category: ATP Challenger Tour; ITF Women's World Tennis Tour
- Prize money: €74,825 (men) $60,000 (women)
- Surface: Clay / Outdoor
- Location: Split, Croatia

Champions

Men's singles
- (Slovakia) Jozef Kovalík

Women's singles
- (Croatia) Jana Fett

Men's doubles
- (France) Jonathan Eysseric / (Netherlands) Bart Stevens

Women's doubles
- (Greece) Valentini Grammatikopoulou / (India) Prarthana Thombare
- Split Open

The 2024 Split Open was a professional tennis tournament played on outdoor clay courts. It was the sixth (men) and third (women) editions of the tournament, which were part of the 2024 ATP Challenger Tour and the 2024 ITF Women's World Tennis Tour. It took place in Split, Croatia, between 1 and 14 April 2024.

== Champions ==
=== Men's singles ===
- (Slovakia) Jozef Kovalík def. (Hungary) Zsombor Piros 6–4, 5–7, 7–5.

=== Women's singles ===
- (Croatia) Jana Fett def. (Turkey) İpek Öz, 6–0, 6–4

=== Men's doubles ===
- (France) Jonathan Eysseric / (Netherlands) Bart Stevens def. (Sweden) Filip Bergevi / (Netherlands) Mick Veldheer 0–6, 6–4, [10–8].

=== Women's doubles ===
- (Greece) Valentini Grammatikopoulou / (India) Prarthana Thombare def. (Slovenia) Veronika Erjavec / (Lithuania) Justina Mikulskytė, 6–4, 6–1

== Men's singles main-draw entrants ==
=== Seeds ===
Country	Player	Rank^{1}	Seed
HUN	Zsombor Piros	109	1
CRO	Duje Ajduković	115	2
SVK	Lukáš Klein	116	3
FRA	Quentin Halys	147	4
ARG	Juan Manuel Cerúndolo	153	5
BIH	Damir Džumhur	159	6
SVK	Alex Molčan	162	7
AUT	Filip Misolic	166	8

- Rankings are as of 1 April 2024.

=== Other entrants ===
The following players received wildcards into the singles main draw:

- (Croatia) Duje Ajduković
- (Croatia) Matej Dodig
- (Croatia) Luka Mikrut

The following players received entry into the singles main draw as alternates:

- (Belgium) Michael Geerts
- (France) Tristan Lamasine
- ~~(Kazakhstan) Timofey Skatov~~
- (Czech Republic) Jiří Veselý

The following players received entry from the qualifying draw:

- (Czech Republic) Jonáš Forejtek
- (United Kingdom) Felix Gill
- (Denmark) Elmer Møller
- (Czech Republic) Jakub Nicod
- (Italy) Lorenzo Rottoli
- (Germany) Marko Topo

The following player received entry as a lucky loser:

- (France) Mathys Erhard

== Women's singles main draw entrants ==
=== Seeds ===
Country	Player	Rank	Seed
AUT	Julia Grabher	111	1
CRO	Jana Fett	159	2
HUN	Panna Udvardy	160	3
SUI	Simona Waltert	181	4
SLO	Veronika Erjavec	184	5
FRA	Carole Monnet	195	6
CRO	Tena Lukas	203	7
SLO	Polona Hercog	213	8

- Rankings are as of 18 March 2024.

=== Other entrants ===
The following players received wildcards into the singles main draw:

- (Croatia) Luna Ivković
- (Croatia) Iva Primorac
- (Hungary) Natália Szabanin
- (Croatia) Tara Würth

The following players received entry into the singles main draw using special rankings:

- (Slovenia) Polona Hercog
- (Germany) Nastasja Schunk

The following players received entry from the qualifying draw:

- (Turkey) Berfu Cengiz
- (Slovenia) Pia Lovrič
- (Czech Republic) Jesika Malečková
- (Germany) Julia Middendorf
- Veronika Miroshnichenko
- (Czech Republic) Barbora Palicová
- (Germany) Lena Papadakis
- (Germany) Stephanie Wagner
