= 2024 Split Open – Men's doubles =

Men's doubles
- 2024 Split Open

Final
- Champions: (France) Jonathan Eysseric (Netherlands) Bart Stevens
- Runners-up: (Sweden) Filip Bergevi (Netherlands) Mick Veldheer
- Score: 0–6, 6–4, [10–8]

Events
Singles	men	women
Doubles	men	women
- Split Open

Sadio Doumbia and Fabien Reboul were the defending champions but chose not to defend their title.

Jonathan Eysseric and Bart Stevens won the title after defeating Filip Bergevi and Mick Veldheer 0–6, 6–4, [10–8] in the final.

== Seeds ==
1. (India) Vijay Sundar Prashanth / (United States) Reese Stalder (quarterfinals)
2. (Sweden) André Göransson / (Netherlands) Sem Verbeek (semifinals)
3. (France) Jonathan Eysseric / (Netherlands) Bart Stevens (champions)
4. (Czech Republic) Roman Jebavý / (Austria) Philipp Oswald (quarterfinals)

== Draw ==
Key

- Q = Qualifier
- WC = Wild card
- LL = Lucky loser
- Alt = Alternate
- ITF = ITF entry
- PR = Protected ranking
- SR = Special ranking
- SE = Special exempt
- JE = Junior exempt
- JR = Junior Accelerator Programme entrant
- CO = College Accelerator Programme entrant
- NG = Next Gen Accelerator Program entrant
- w/o = Walkover
- r = Retired
- d = Defaulted

=== Draw ===
First round
1	(India) VS Prashanth (United States) R Stalder	6	6
WC	(Croatia) M Dodig (Croatia) Marino Jakić	3	2
(Croatia) Z Babić (Austria) F Misolic	4	2
(Romania) A Jecan (Poland) S Walków	6	6
4	(Czech Republic) R Jebavý (Austria) P Oswald	6	6
(United Kingdom) B Harris (Australia) A Taylor	3	3
(Sweden) F Bergevi (Netherlands) M Veldheer	7^{7}	6
(Ukraine) D Molchanov (Slovakia) I Zelenay	6^{5}	4
(Switzerland) L Margaroli (Argentina) S Rodríguez Taverna	7^{7}	6
(Poland) K Drzewiecki (Belgium) M Geerts	6^{2}	2
WC	(Croatia) L Mikrut (Croatia) M Poljičak	5	6^{4}
3	(France) J Eysseric (Netherlands) B Stevens	7	7^{7}
(Serbia) I Sabanov (Serbia) M Sabanov	6^{8}	2
(Germany) J Schnaitter (Germany) M Wallner	7^{10}	6
(France) D Added (Austria) N Oberleitner	5	3
2	(Sweden) A Göransson (Netherlands) S Verbeek	7	6

Quarterfinals
1	(India) VS Prashanth (United States) R Stalder	3	5
(Romania) A Jecan (Poland) S Walków	6	7
4	(Czech Republic) R Jebavý (Austria) P Oswald	2	6^{6}
(Sweden) F Bergevi (Netherlands) M Veldheer	6	7^{8}
(Switzerland) L Margaroli (Argentina) S Rodríguez Taverna	4	3
3	(France) J Eysseric (Netherlands) B Stevens	6	6
(Germany) J Schnaitter (Germany) M Wallner	4	4
2	(Sweden) A Göransson (Netherlands) S Verbeek	6	6

Semifinals
(Romania) A Jecan (Poland) S Walków	4	7^{7}	[6]
(Sweden) F Bergevi (Netherlands) M Veldheer	6	6^{2}	[10]
3	(France) J Eysseric (Netherlands) B Stevens	6	6
2	(Sweden) A Göransson (Netherlands) S Verbeek	1	4

Final
(Sweden) F Bergevi (Netherlands) M Veldheer	6	4	[8]
3	(France) J Eysseric (Netherlands) B Stevens	0	6	[10]
