= 2015 Fed Cup Europe/Africa Zone Group III – Pool B =

Pool B of the 2015 Fed Cup Europe/Africa Group III was one of four pools in the Europe/Africa Group III of the 2015 Fed Cup. Three teams competed in a round robin competition, with the top team and bottom teams proceeding to their respective sections of the play-offs: the top team played for advancement to Group II.

== Standings ==
		MNE	GRE	ARM	RR; W–L	Set; W–L	Game; W–L	Standings
62	Montenegro		0–3	1–2	1–5	2–10	24–65	3
82	Greece	3–0		3–0	6–0	11–0	66–10	1
90	Armenia	2–1	0–3		2–4	4–7	35–50	2

== Round-robin ==
=== Greece vs. Armenia ===
Greece
3
Bellevue, Ulcinj, Montenegro
14 April 2015
Clay

Armenia
0

			1	2	3
1	(Greece) (Armenia)	Despina Papamichail; Lusine Chobanyan	6; 1	6; 0
2	(Greece) (Armenia)	Maria Sakkari; Ani Amiraghyan	6; 4			retired
3	(Greece) (Armenia)	Eleni Daniilidou / Despina Papamichail; Milena Avetisyan / Lusine Chobanyan	6; 0	6; 1

=== Montenegro vs. Armenia ===
Montenegro
1
Bellevue, Ulcinj, Montenegro
15 April 2015
Clay

Armenia
2

			1	2	3
1	(Montenegro) (Armenia)	Kristina Samardžić; Lusine Chobanyan	6; 1	6; 4
2	(Montenegro) (Armenia)	Tamara Bojanić; Ani Amiraghyan	4; 6	1; 6
3	(Montenegro) (Armenia)	Tamara Bojanić / Nikoleta Bulatović; Ani Amiraghyan / Milena Avetisyan	1; 6	2; 6

=== Montenegro vs. Greece ===
Montenegro
0
Bellevue, Ulcinj, Montenegro
16 April 2015
Clay

Greece
3

			1	2	3
1	(Montenegro) (Greece)	Nina Kalezić; Valentini Grammatikopoulou	1; 6	1; 6
2	(Montenegro) (Greece)	Kristina Samardžić; Maria Sakkari	0; 6	0; 6
3	(Montenegro) (Greece)	Nina Kalezić / Kristina Samardžić; Eleni Daniilidou / Despina Papamichail	1; 6	1; 6

== See also ==
- Fed Cup structure
