= Angola Ladies Open =

- 2026 Angola Ladies Open

WTA 125
- Event name: Angola Ladies Open
- Location: Luanda, Angola
- Venue: Kikuxi Tennis Academy
- Category: WTA 125
- Surface: Hard
- Draw: 32S/10Q/14D
- Prize money: $115,000
- Website: website

Current champions (2026)
- Singles: Sofya Lansere
- Doubles: (Burundi) Sada Nahimana (Kenya) Angella Okutoyi

The Angola Ladies Open is a tournament for professional female tennis players played on outdoor hardcourts. The event is classified as a WTA 125 tournament and is held at the Kikuxi Tennis Academy in Luanda, Angola. Luís de Sousa is the tournament director. It is the first ever WTA event to be staged in the Angola. Luanda has previously been host to M15/M25 tournaments on the Men's World Tennis Tour. It is also the first ever WTA 125 tournament to be staged on African soil.

== Past finals ==
=== Singles ===
Year	Champion	Runners-up	Score
2026	Sofya Lansere	(France) Anna Blinkova	5–7, 6–1, 6–4

=== Doubles ===
Year	Champions	Runners-up	Score
2026	(Burundi) Sada Nahimana (Kenya) Angella Okutoyi	(Poland) Martyna Kubka (Lithuania) Justina Mikulskytė	6–4, 6–4
