= 2014 Fed Cup Europe/Africa Zone Group II – play-offs =

International tennis competition play-offs

The play-offs of the 2013 Fed Cup Europe/Africa Zone Group II were the final stages of the Group II zonal competition involving teams from Europe and Africa. Using the positions determined in their pools, the seven teams faced off to determine their placing in the 2014 Fed Cup Europe/Africa Zone Group II. The top two teams advanced to Group I, and the bottom two teams were relegated down to the Group III for the next year.

Placing	Pool A	Pool B
1	Liechtenstein	Georgia
2	Finland	Bosnia and Herzegovina
3	Lithuania	South Africa
4	Montenegro	Egypt

== Promotional play-offs ==
The first-placed teams of each pool played against the second-placed teams of the other pool in head-to-head rounds. The winner of each round advanced to the 2015 Europe/Africa Zone Group I.

=== Liechtenstein vs. Bosnia and Herzegovina ===
Liechtenstein
2
Šiauliai Tennis School, Šiauliai, Lithuania
19 April 2013
Hard (indoors)

Bosnia and Herzegovina
0

			1	2	3
1	(Liechtenstein) (Bosnia and Herzegovina)	Kathinka von Deichmann; Dea Herdželaš	7; 5	6; 4
2	(Liechtenstein) (Bosnia and Herzegovina)	Stephanie Vogt; Jasmina Tinjić	6; 3	6; 1
3	(Liechtenstein) (Bosnia and Herzegovina)	Stephanie Vogt / Kathinka von Deichmann; Anita Husarić / Jasmina Tinjić				not played

=== Finland vs. Georgia ===
Finland
1
Šiauliai Tennis School, Šiauliai, Lithuania
19 April 2014
Hard (indoors)

Georgia
2

			1	2	3
1	(Finland) (Georgia (country))	Ella Leivo; Oksana Kalashnikova	1; 6	7; 5	7^{7} 6^{5}
2	(Finland) (Georgia (country))	Piia Suomalainen; Sofia Shapatava	2; 6	2; 6
3	(Finland) (Georgia (country))	Ella Leivo / Piia Suomalainen; Oksana Kalashnikova / Sofia Shapatava	4; 6	1; 6

== Relegation play-offs ==
The third-placed teams of each pool played against the fourth-placed teams of the other pool in head-to-head rounds. The loser of each round was relegated to the 2015 Europe/Africa Zone Group III.

=== Lithuania vs. Egypt ===
Lithuania
1
Šiauliai Tennis School, Šiauliai, Lithuania
19 April 2014
Hard (indoors)

Egypt
2

			1	2	3
1	(Lithuania) (Egypt)	Akvilė Paražinskaitė; Sandra Samir	6; 2	6^{2} 7^{7}	4; 6
2	(Lithuania) (Egypt)	Lina Stančiūtė; Ola Abou Zekry	6; 4	6; 4
3	(Lithuania) (Egypt)	Justina Mikulskytė / Lina Stančiūtė; Ola Abou Zekry / Mayar Sherif	5; 7	6^{4} 7^{7}

=== Montenegro vs. South Africa ===
Montenegro
0
Šiauliai Tennis School, Šiauliai, Lithuania
19 April 2014
Hard (indoors)

South Africa
3

			1	2	3
1	(Montenegro) (South Africa)	Nina Kalezić; Natasha Fourouclas	1; 6	0; 6
2	(Montenegro) (South Africa)	Tamara Bojanić; Chanel Simmonds	1; 6	4; 6
3	(Montenegro) (South Africa)	Nina Kalezić / Nikoleta Bulatović; Natasha Fourouclas / Natalie Grandin	3; 6	1; 6

== Final placements ==
Placing	Teams	
Promoted	Liechtenstein	Georgia
Third	Bosnia and Herzegovina	Finland
Fifth	South Africa	Egypt
Relegated	Montenegro	Lithuania

- Liechtenstein and Georgia were promoted to Europe/Africa Zone Group I for 2015.
- Montenegro and Lithuania were relegated to Europe/Africa Zone Group III for 2015.
