= 2026 Angola Ladies Open – Doubles =

Doubles
- 2026 Angola Ladies Open

Final
- Champion: (Burundi) Sada Nahimana (Kenya) Angella Okutoyi
- Runner-up: (Poland) Martyna Kubka (Lithuania) Justina Mikulskytė
- Score: 6–4, 6–4

Details
- Draw: 14
- Seeds: 4

Events
Singles	Doubles
- Angola Ladies Open

This was the first edition of the tournament.

Sada Nahimana and Angella Okutoyi won the title, defeating Martyna Kubka and Justina Mikulskytė 6–4, 6–4 in the final.

== Seeds ==
The top two seeds received a bye into the quarterfinals.

1. (China) Li Zongyu / (Slovenia) Kristina Novak (semifinals)
2. (Poland) Martyna Kubka / (Lithuania) Justina Mikulskytė (final)
3. (Mexico) Ana Sofía Sánchez / Ksenia Zaytseva (semifinals)
4. (France) Tiphanie Lemaître / (Egypt) Sandra Samir (first round)

== Draw ==
Key

- Q = Qualifier
- WC = Wild card
- LL = Lucky loser
- Alt = Alternate
- ITF = ITF entry
- PR = Protected ranking
- SR = Special ranking
- SE = Special exempt
- JE = Junior exempt
- JR = Junior Accelerator Programme entrant
- CO = College Accelerator Programme entrant
- NG = Next Gen Accelerator Program entrant
- w/o = Walkover
- r = Retired
- d = Defaulted

=== Draw ===
First round
(India) P Rachapudi (India) S Vig	6	7
(India) A Easwaramurthi (South Africa) A Vosloo	3	5
4	(France) T Lemaître (Egypt) S Samir	2	5
(Burundi) S Nahimana (Kenya) A Okutoyi	6	7
(Israel) M Laron (India) M Sawant	w/o
(Algeria) F Heddar (Netherlands) E van Poppel
K Kroitor (Bulgaria) I Shinikova	6	6
(Germany) L Böhner (Germany) F Sziedat	4	3
(Egypt) L Alhussein Abdel Aziz (Egypt) J Ibrahim	0	3
3	(Mexico) AS Sánchez; K Zaytseva	6	6
(France) D Vaissaud (South Africa) J van Zyl	6	5	[6]
(South Africa) Wa Mdlulwa (South Africa) Wo Mdlulwa	1	7	[10]

Quarterfinals
1	(China) Z Li (Slovenia) K Novak	6	6
(India) P Rachapudi (India) S Vig	1	2
(Burundi) S Nahimana (Kenya) A Okutoyi	w/o
(Israel) M Laron (India) M Sawant
K Kroitor (Bulgaria) I Shinikova	3	6	[5]
3	(Mexico) AS Sánchez; K Zaytseva	6	4	[10]
(South Africa) Wa Mdlulwa (South Africa) Wo Mdlulwa	4	4
2	(Poland) M Kubka (Lithuania) J Mikulskytė	6	6

Semifinals
1	(China) Z Li (Slovenia) K Novak	5	5
(Burundi) S Nahimana (Kenya) A Okutoyi	7	7
3	(Mexico) AS Sánchez; K Zaytseva	3	4
2	(Poland) M Kubka (Lithuania) J Mikulskytė	6	6

Final
(Burundi) S Nahimana (Kenya) A Okutoyi	6	6
2	(Poland) M Kubka (Lithuania) J Mikulskytė	4	4
