= 2014 Fed Cup Europe/Africa Zone Group II – Pool B =

Group A of the 2014 Fed Cup Europe/Africa Zone Group II was one of two pools in the Europe/Africa zone of the 2014 Fed Cup. Four teams competed in a round robin competition, with the top team and the bottom team proceeding to their respective sections of the play-offs: the top team played for advancement to Group I, while the bottom team faced potential relegation to Group III.

== Standings ==
	(South Africa) RSA	(Bosnia and Herzegovina) BIH	(Georgia (country)) GEO	(Egypt) EGY	RR; W–L	Match; W–L	Set; W–L	Game; W–L	Standings
South Africa		1–2	1–2	3–0	1–2	5–4	12–8	108–88	3
Bosnia and Herzegovina	2–1		0–3	2–1	2–1	4–5	9–12	88–109	2
Georgia	2–1	3–0		3–0	3–0	8–1	16–3	113–65	1
Egypt	0–3	1–2	0–3		0–3	1–8	3–17	66–113	4

== Round-robin ==
=== South Africa vs. Bosnia and Herzegovina ===
South Africa
1
Šiauliai Tennis School, Šiauliai, Lithuania
16 April 2013
Hard (indoors)

Bosnia and Herzegovina
2

			1	2	3
1	(South Africa) (Bosnia and Herzegovina)	Madrie le Roux; Anita Husarić	6; 2	6; 4
2	(South Africa) (Bosnia and Herzegovina)	Chanel Simmonds; Jasmina Tinjić	4; 6	4; 6
3	(South Africa) (Bosnia and Herzegovina)	Natalie Grandin / Chanel Simmonds; Dea Herdželaš / Jasmina Tinjić	6; 3	6^{3} 7^{7}	4; 6

=== Georgia vs. Egypt ===
Georgia
3
Šiauliai Tennis School, Šiauliai, Lithuania
16 April 2013
Hard (indoors)

Egypt
0

			1	2	3
1	(Georgia (country)) (Egypt)	Ekaterine Gorgodze; Sandra Samir	7; 5	6; 3
2	(Georgia (country)) (Egypt)	Sofia Shapatava; Mayar Sherif	6; 1	6; 1
3	(Georgia (country)) (Egypt)	Oksana Kalashnikova / Sofia Shapatava; Ola Abou Zekry / Mayar Sherif	6; 2	6; 3

=== South Africa vs. Georgia ===
South Africa
1
Šiauliai Tennis School, Šiauliai, Lithuania
17 April 2013
Hard (indoors)

Georgia
2

			1	2	3
1	(South Africa) (Georgia (country))	Madrie le Roux; Sofia Kvatsabaia	7; 5	6; 3
2	(South Africa) (Georgia (country))	Chanel Simmonds; Sofia Shapatava	3; 6	3; 6
3	(South Africa) (Georgia (country))	Natalie Grandin / Chanel Simmonds; Oksana Kalashnikova / Sofia Shapatava	7^{7} 6^{3}	6^{6} 7^{8}	3; 6

=== Bosnia and Herzegovina vs. Egypt ===
Bosnia and Herzegovina
2
Šiauliai Tennis School, Šiauliai, Lithuania
17 April 2013
Hard (indoors)

Egypt
1

			1	2	3
1	(Bosnia and Herzegovina) (Egypt)	Dea Herdželaš; Sandra Samir	6; 4	4; 6	2; 6
2	(Bosnia and Herzegovina) (Egypt)	Jasmina Tinjić; Mayar Sherif	6; 3	6; 3
3	(Bosnia and Herzegovina) (Egypt)	Anita Husarić / Jasmina Tinjić; Ola Abou Zekry / Mayar Sherif	2; 6	7; 5	6; 3

=== South Africa vs. Egypt ===
South Africa
3
Šiauliai Tennis School, Šiauliai, Lithuania
18 April 2013
Hard (indoors)

Egypt
0

			1	2	3
1	(South Africa) (Egypt)	Madrie le Roux; Sandra Samir	6; 3	6; 2
2	(South Africa) (Egypt)	Chanel Simmonds; Mayar Sherif	6; 1	1; 0		retired
3	(South Africa) (Egypt)	Natasha Fourouclas / Natalie Grandin; Ola Abou Zekry / Sandra Samir	7; 5	6; 4

=== Bosnia and Herzegovina vs. Georgia ===
Bosnia and Herzegovina
0
Šiauliai Tennis School, Šiauliai, Lithuania
18 April 2013
Hard (indoors)

Georgia
3

			1	2	3
1	(Bosnia and Herzegovina) (Georgia (country))	Anita Husarić; Ekaterine Gorgodze	5; 7	2; 6
2	(Bosnia and Herzegovina) (Georgia (country))	Jasmina Tinjić; Sofia Shapatava	4; 6	2; 6
3	(Bosnia and Herzegovina) (Georgia (country))	Anita Husarić / Jasmina Tinjić; Oksana Kalashnikova / Sofia Shapatava	2; 1			retired
