= Natasha Fourouclas =

South African tennis player

- Country (sports): South Africa
- Residence: Bedfordview, South Africa
- Born: 31 January 1994 (age 32) Limassol, Cyprus
- Plays: Right (two-handed backhand)
- Prize money: $24,225

Singles
- Career record: 93–81
- Highest ranking: No. 474 (23 July 2012)

Doubles
- Career record: 21–36
- Career titles: 1 ITF
- Highest ranking: No. 1059 (5 August 2019)
Medal record
Representing South Africa
Women's tennis
All-Africa Games
Bronze medal – third place	2011 Maputo	Doubles

Natasha Fourouclas (born 31 January 1994) is a South African former tennis player.

Fourouclas has career-high singles ranking by the WTA of 474, achieved on 23 July 2012.

Since her debut for the South Africa Fed Cup team in 2011, she has accumulated a win–loss record of 4–0.

== ITF finals ==
=== Singles (0–6) ===
Legend $25,000 tournaments $10,000 tournaments	Finals by surface Hard (0–4) Clay (0–2)

Result	No.	Date	Tournament	Surface	Opponent	Score
Loss	1.	26 November 2011	Rancagua, Chile	Clay	(Austria) Tina Schiechtl	3–6, 6–3, 0–6
Loss	2.	31 March 2012	Ribeirão Preto, Brazil	Clay	(Brazil) Gabriela Cé	1–6, 0–6
Loss	3.	7 April 2012	Ribeirão Preto, Brazil	Hard	(Brazil) Beatriz Haddad Maia	0–6, 1–6
Loss	4.	19 January 2014	Tinajo, Spain	Hard	(Italy) Anastasia Grymalska	3–6, 3–6
Loss	5.	2 February 2014	Tinajo, Spain	Hard	(Spain) Laura Pous Tió	0–6, 3–6
Loss	6.	31 May 2014	Sun City, South Africa	Hard	(South Africa) Michelle Sammons	6–2, 5–7, 4–6

=== Doubles (1–0) ===
Legend $15,000 tournaments	Finals by surface Clay (1–0)

Result	No.	Date	Tournament	Surface	Partner	Opponents	Score
Win	1.	8 June 2019	Tabarka, Tunisia	Clay	(Slovakia) Ingrid Vojčináková	(Chile) Bárbara Gatica (Brazil) Rebeca Pereira	3–6, 6–4, [10–8]

== Fed Cup participation ==
=== Singles (1–0) ===
Edition	Round	Date	Location	Against	Surface	Opponent	W/L	Score
2014 Fed Cup	Europe/Africa Zone; Group II – Play-offs	19 April 2014	Šiauliai, Lithuania	Montenegro	Hard (i)	(Montenegro) Nina Kalezić	W	6–1, 6–0

=== Doubles (3–0) ===
Edition	Round	Date	Location	Partner	Against	Surface	Opponents	W/L	Score
2011 Fed Cup	Europe/Africa Zone Group III – Play-offs	7 May 2011	Cairo, Egypt	(South Africa) Madrie Le Roux	Egypt	Clay	(Egypt) Mai El Kamash (Egypt) Mayar Sherif	W	7–5, 4–6, [10–6]
2014 Fed Cup	Europe/Africa Zone Group II – Pool B	18 April 2014	Šiauliai, Lithuania	(South Africa) Natalie Grandin	Egypt	Hard (i)	(Egypt) Ola Abou Zekry (Egypt) Sandra Samir	W	7–5, 6–4
2014 Fed Cup	Europe/Africa Zone Group II – Play-offs	19 April 2014	Šiauliai, Lithuania	(South Africa) Natalie Grandin	Montenegro	Hard (i)	(Montenegro) Nina Kalezic (Montenegro) Tamara Bojanic	W	6–3, 6–1
