= 2024 Split Open – Men's singles =

Men's singles
- 2024 Split Open

Final
- Champion: (Slovakia) Jozef Kovalík
- Runner-up: (Hungary) Zsombor Piros
- Score: 6–4, 5–7, 7–5

Events
Singles	men	women
Doubles	men	women
- Split Open

Zsombor Piros was the defending champion but lost in the final to Jozef Kovalík.

Kovalík won the title after defeating Piros 6–4, 5–7, 7–5 in the final.

== Seeds ==
1. (Hungary) Zsombor Piros (final)
2. (Croatia) Duje Ajduković (second round)
3. (Slovakia) Lukáš Klein (first round)
4. (France) Quentin Halys (second round)
5. (Argentina) Juan Manuel Cerúndolo (first round, retired)
6. (Bosnia and Herzegovina) Damir Džumhur (first round)
7. (Slovakia) Alex Molčan (first round)
8. (Austria) Filip Misolic (quarterfinals)

== Draw ==
Key

- Q = Qualifier
- WC = Wild card
- LL = Lucky loser
- Alt = Alternate
- ITF = ITF entry
- PR = Protected ranking
- SR = Special ranking
- SE = Special exempt
- JE = Junior exempt
- JR = Junior Accelerator Programme entrant
- CO = College Accelerator Programme entrant
- NG = Next Gen Accelerator Program entrant
- w/o = Walkover
- r = Retired
- d = Defaulted

=== Finals ===
Semifinals
1	(Hungary) Zsombor Piros	6	6
WC	(Croatia) Matej Dodig	3	3
(Slovakia) Jozef Kovalík	6	6
(France) Benjamin Bonzi	4	3

Final
1	(Hungary) Zsombor Piros	4	7	5
(Slovakia) Jozef Kovalík	6	5	7

=== Top half ===
First round
1	(Hungary) Z Piros	4	6	6
(Bosnia and Herzegovina) N Fatić	6	3	1
LL	(France) Mathys Erhard	3	2
(Austria) L Neumayer	6	6
Alt	(Belgium) M Geerts	7^{7}	6
Q	(Italy) L Rottoli	6^{2}	1
(United Kingdom) B Harris	5	3
8	(Austria) F Misolic	7	6
3	(Slovakia) L Klein	6^{3}	3
Q	(Denmark) E Møller	7^{7}	6
Alt	(Czech Republic) J Veselý	3	4
Alt	(France) T Lamasine	6	6
(Poland) M Kaśnikowski	6	6
(Czech Republic) Z Kolář	1	2
WC	(Croatia) M Dodig	6	6
7	(Slovakia) A Molčan	2	4

Second round
1	(Hungary) Z Piros	6	6
(Austria) L Neumayer	3	2
Alt	(Belgium) M Geerts	4	6^{7}
8	(Austria) F Misolic	6	7^{9}
Q	(Denmark) E Møller	6	6
Alt	(France) T Lamasine	1	3
(Poland) M Kaśnikowski	4	4
WC	(Croatia) M Dodig	6	6

Quarterfinals
1	(Hungary) Z Piros	6	6
8	(Austria) F Misolic	4	1
Q	(Denmark) E Møller	2	0
WC	(Croatia) M Dodig	6	6

Semifinals
1	(Hungary) Z Piros	6	6
WC	(Croatia) M Dodig	3	3

=== Bottom half ===
First round
5	(Argentina) JM Cerúndolo	6	4	0^{r}
(Italy) S Travaglia	3	6	4
Q	(United Kingdom) F Gill	2	6^{2}
Q	(Germany) M Topo	6	7^{7}
(Romania) ND Ionel	4	1
(Slovakia) J Kovalík	6	6
I Gakhov	3	4
4	(France) Q Halys	6	6
6	(Bosnia and Herzegovina) D Džumhur	0	1
WC	(Croatia) L Mikrut	6	6
Q	(Czech Republic) Jakub Nicod	2	6^{4}
(Germany) H Squire	6	7^{7}
(Argentina) S Rodríguez Taverna	2	2
(France) B Bonzi	6	6
Q	(Czech Republic) J Forejtek	7^{9}	5	1
2/WC	(Croatia) D Ajduković	6^{7}	7	6

Second round
(Italy) S Travaglia	6	6
Q	(Germany) M Topo	4	2
(Slovakia) J Kovalík	6	3	6
4	(France) Q Halys	2	6	4
WC	(Croatia) L Mikrut	3	4
(Germany) H Squire	6	6
(France) B Bonzi	6	4	7^{7}
2/WC	(Croatia) D Ajduković	3	6	6^{5}

Quarterfinals
(Italy) S Travaglia	4	6^{2}
(Slovakia) J Kovalík	6	7^{7}
(Germany) H Squire	6	3	4
(France) B Bonzi	4	6	6

Semifinals
(Slovakia) J Kovalík	6	6
(France) B Bonzi	4	3
