= Kathinka von Deichmann =

Liechtenstein tennis player (born 1994)

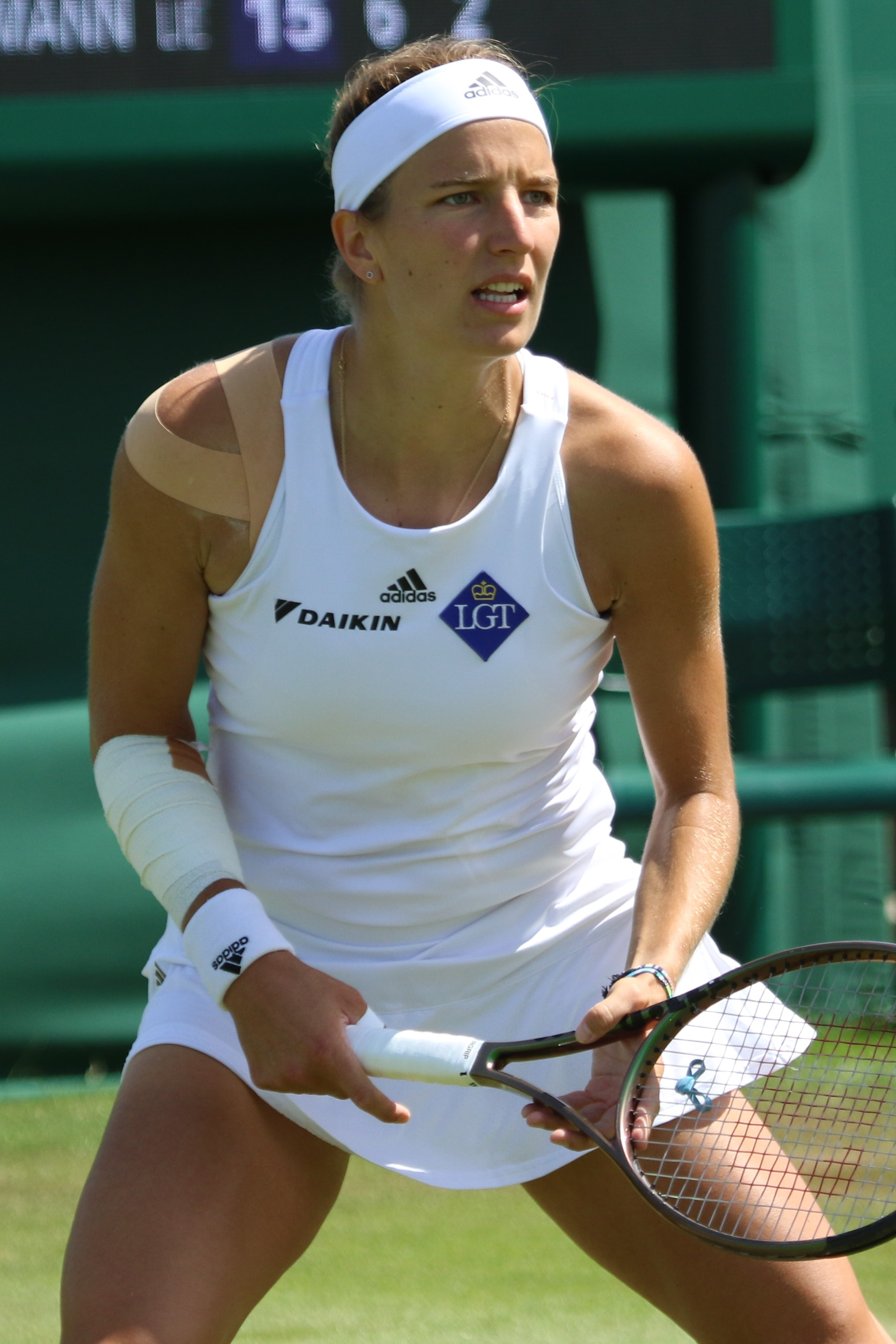
- Von Deichmann at the 2022 Wimbledon Championships
- Country (sports): Liechtenstein
- Born: 16 May 1994 (age 32) Vaduz, Liechtenstein
- Height: 1.77 m (5 ft 10 in)
- Turned pro: 2012
- Retired: 2026
- Plays: Right (one-handed backhand)
- Prize money: $774,680
- Official website: kathinkavondeichmann.com

Singles
- Career record: 444–279
- Career titles: 15 ITF
- Highest ranking: No. 153 (8 October 2018)

Grand Slam singles results
- Australian Open: Q2 (2026)
- French Open: Q2 (2018, 2019, 2022, 2023, 2025, 2026)
- Wimbledon: Q3 (2022)
- US Open: 1R (2018)

Doubles
- Career record: 71–68
- Career titles: 4 ITF
- Highest ranking: No. 343 (17 July 2017)

Team competitions
- Fed Cup: 23–14
Medal record
Games of the Small States of Europe
Gold medal – first place	2011 Liechtenstein	Doubles
Gold medal – first place	2013 Luxembourg	Doubles
Silver medal – second place	2009 Cyprus	Doubles
Silver medal – second place	2011 Liechtenstein	Singles
Silver medal – second place	2013 Luxembourg	Singles
Silver medal – second place	2015 Iceland	Singles
Bronze medal – third place	2009 Cyprus	Singles
Bronze medal – third place	2015 Iceland	Mixed Doubles
- Last updated on: 15 September 2026.

Kathinka von Deichmann (born 16 May 1994) is a former professional tennis player from Liechtenstein. On 8 October 2018, she reached her best WTA ranking of world No. 153 in singles, and on 17 July 2017, she peaked at No. 343 in doubles. Von Deichmann has won 15 singles and four doubles titles on the ITF Women's Circuit.

== Career ==
At the 2018 US Open, von Deichmann made tennis history for her country by becoming the first Liechtensteiner to reach the main draw of singles of a Grand Slam, after winning three matches in the qualifying tournament. She defeated Priscilla Hon in the first qualifying round, Gail Brodsky in the second round and finally Martina Trevisan also in straight sets to reach the main draw. She then lost by retirement to fellow qualifier, Anhelina Kalinina, in the first round.

Playing for Liechtenstein Fed Cup team, von Deichmann has a win–loss record of 23–14 as of March 2024.

She paired with Yvonne Meusburger for her WTA Tour debut at the 2014 Nürnberger Versicherungscup in doubles, losing in the first round.

Appearing as a lucky loser, von Deichmann won her first completed WTA Tour match when she defeated eight seed Anna Karolina Schmiedlova in straight sets in the first round of the 2024 Prague Open, having previously triumphed in two matches in Lugano 2018 and Seoul 2023 when her opponents retired injured. She lost to Oksana Selekhmeteva in the round of 16.

At the 2024 Țiriac Foundation Trophy, she reached her first WTA 125 final defeating sixth seed Selena Janicijevic, Despina Papamichail, top seed María Lourdes Carlé, and wildcard Patricia Maria Țig. She lost in the final to Miriam Bulgaru.

von Deichmann announced her retirement from professional tennis in September 2026.

== Grand Slam singles performance timeline ==
Key
W	F	SF	QF	#R	RR	Q#	P#	DNQ	A	Z#	PO	G	S	B	NMS	NTI	P	NH

(W) winner; (F) finalist; (SF) semifinalist; (QF) quarterfinalist; (#R) rounds 4, 3, 2, 1; (RR) round-robin stage; (Q#) qualification round; (P#) preliminary round; (DNQ) did not qualify; (A) absent; (Z#) Davis/Fed Cup Zonal Group (with number indication) or (PO) play-off; (G) gold, (S) silver or (B) bronze Olympic/Paralympic medal; (NMS) not a Masters tournament; (NTI) not a Tier I tournament; (P) postponed; (NH) not held; (SR) strike rate (events won / competed); (W–L) win–loss record.
To avoid confusion and double counting, these charts are updated at the conclusion of a tournament or when the player's participation has ended.

Current through the 2023 French Open qualifying.

Tournament	2017	2018	2019	...	2022	2023	2024	W–L
Australian Open	A	Q1	Q1		Q1	Q1	A	0–0
French Open	A	Q2	Q2		Q2	Q2		0–0
Wimbledon	Q2	Q2	A		Q3	Q1		0–0
US Open	Q1	1R	A		A	A	Q2	0–1
Win–loss	0–0	0–1	0–0		0–0	0–0		0–1

== WTA Challenger finals ==
=== Singles: 1 (1 runner up) ===
Result	W-L	Date	Tournament	Surface	Opponent	Score
Loss	0–1	Sep 2024	Open Romania Ladies, Romania	Clay	(Romania) Miriam Bulgaru	3–6, 6–1, 4–6

== ITF Circuit finals ==
=== Singles: 28 (15 titles, 13 runner–ups) ===
Legend W60/75 tournaments W25 tournaments W10/15 tournaments	Finals by surface Hard (8–6) Clay (7–6) Carpet (0–1)

Result	W–L	Date	Tournament	Tier	Surface	Opponent	Score
Loss	0–1	Oct 2012	ITF Kalamata, Greece	W10	Hard	(Switzerland) Lara Michel	6–7^{(4)}, 6–0, 0–6
Win	1–1	Oct 2012	ITF Coimbra, Portugal	W10	Hard	(Moldova) Aliona Bolsova	6–1, 6–3
Loss	1–2	Mar 2013	ITF Frauenfeld, Switzerland	W10	Carpet (i)	(Czech Republic) Kateřina Siniaková	3–6, 6–4, 4–6
Win	2–2	Jan 2014	ITF Stuttgart, Germany	W10	Hard (i)	(Bulgaria) Julia Terziyska	6–4, 6–4
Loss	2–3	Mar 2014	ITF Heraklion, Greece	W10	Hard	(Germany) Anna Zaja	4–6, 1–6
Win	3–3	Oct 2014	ITF Antalya, Turkey	W10	Hard	(Czech Republic) Kateřina Kramperová	6–2, 6–7^{(6)}, 6–4
Win	4–3	Oct 2014	ITF Antalya, Turkey	W10	Hard	(Romania) Daiana Negreanu	4–6, 7–6^{(4)}, 6–4
Win	5–3	Apr 2015	ITF Port El Kantaoui, Tunisia	W10	Hard	(Belarus) Sadafmoh Tolibova	6–3, 6–4
Loss	5–4	Oct 2015	ITF Port El Kantaoui, Tunisia	W10	Hard	(Belgium) Magali Kempen	7–5, 3–6, 2–6
Win	6–4	Oct 2015	ITF Port El Kantaoui, Tunisia	W10	Hard	(Russia) Yana Sizikova	7–5, 5–7, 6–2
Loss	6–5	Dec 2015	ITF Ortisei, Italy	W10	Hard (i)	(Italy) Georgia Brescia	4–6, 6–4, 3–6
Win	7–5	Feb 2016	ITF Sunderland, UK	W10	Hard (i)	(France) Manon Arcangioli	6–3, 7–6^{(2)}
Win	8–5	Mar 2016	ITF Gonesse, France	W10	Clay (i)	(Spain) Olga Sáez Larra	6–3, 3–6, 6–4
Loss	8–6	May 2016	ITF Bol, Croatia	W10	Clay	(Czech Republic) Gabriela Pantůčková	5–7, 5–7
Win	9–6	Jul 2016	ITF Bad Waltersdorf, Austria	W10	Clay	(Czech Republic) Gabriela Pantůčková	7–5, 6–4
Win	10–6	Sep 2016	ITF Dobrich, Bulgaria	W25	Clay	(Bulgaria) Isabella Shinikova	6–0, 6–3
Loss	10–7	Apr 2017	ITF Santa Margherita di Pula, Italy	W25	Clay	(Croatia) Petra Martić	4–6, 5–7
Loss	10–8	Apr 2017	Chiasso Open, Switzerland	W25	Clay	(Switzerland) Jil Teichmann	6–2, 3–6, 2–6
Win	11–8	May 2017	Wiesbaden Open, Germany	W25	Clay	(Croatia) Petra Martić	4–6, 6–4, 7–6^{(7)}
Loss	11–9	May 2017	ITF Båstad, Sweden	W25	Clay	(Romania) Irina Bara	6–7^{(6)}, 6–4, 2–6
Win	12–9	Apr 2018	Wiesbaden Open, Germany (2)	W25	Clay	(Ukraine) Katarina Zavatska	6–3, 6–2
Win	13–9	May 2018	ITF La Bisbal, Spain	W25	Clay	(Spain) Sara Sorribes Tormo	6–3, 3–6, 6–3
Win	14–9	Oct 2019	ITF Nanning, China	W25	Hard	(Russia) Anastasia Gasanova	4–6, 7–6^{(3)}, 7–5
Loss	14–10	Nov 2020	ITF Ortisei, Italy	W15	Hard (i)	(Italy) Federica di Sarra	3–6, 3–6
Win	15–10	May 2022	Koper Open, Slovenia	W60	Clay	(Spain) Andrea Lázaro García	3–6, 6–3, 6–2
Loss	15–11	May 2023	ITF Santa Margherita di Pula, Italy	W25	Clay	(Greece) Valentini Grammatikopoulou	4–6, 1–6
Loss	15–12	May 2024	ITF Grado, Italy	W75	Clay	(United Kingdom) Francesca Jones	1–6, 5–7
Loss	15–13	Dec 2024	ITF Nonthaburi, Thailand	W75	Hard	(Japan) Kyōka Okamura	5–7, 6–1, 5–7

=== Doubles: 12 (4 titles, 8 runner–ups) ===
Legend W60 tournaments W25 tournaments W10 tournaments	Finals by surface Hard (2–4) Clay (1–4) Carpet (1–0)

Result	W–L	Date	Tournament	Tier	Surface	Partner	Opponents	Score
Loss	0–1	Oct 2012	ITF Kalamata, Greece	W10	Hard	(Germany) Stefanie Stemmer	(Vietnam) Huỳnh Phương Đài Trang (Israel) Keren Shlomo	6–3, 2–6, [10–12]
Loss	0–2	Oct 2012	ITF Mytilini, Greece	W10	Hard	(Germany) Stefanie Stemmer	(France) Manon Arcangioli (France) Laëtitia Sarrazin	4–6, 3–6
Loss	0–3	Nov 2012	ITF Guimarães, Portugal	W10	Hard	(Germany) Stefanie Stemmer	(Portugal) Margarida Moura (Portugal) Joana Valle Costa	5–7, 6–3, [7–10]
Win	1–3	Mar 2012	ITF Frauenfeld, Switzerland	W10	Carpet (i)	(Switzerland) Nina Stadler	(Germany) Tayisiya Morderger (Germany) Yana Morderger	6–3, 6–4
Loss	1–4	Sep 2013	Open de Saint-Malo, France	W25	Clay	(Germany) Nina Zander	(Bulgaria) Elitsa Kostova (Argentina) Florencia Molinero	2–6, 4–6
Win	2–4	Mar 2014	ITF Heraklion, Greece	W10	Hard	(Slovakia) Petra Uberalová	(Poland) Agata Barańska (Bulgaria) Vivian Zlatanova	7–5, 6–2
Loss	2–5	Apr 2015	ITF Port El Kantaoui, Tunisia	W10	Hard	(Republic of Ireland) Jenny Claffey	(Romania) Mihaela Buzărnescu (Ukraine) Olena Kyrpot	4–6, 2–6
Win	3–5	Apr 2015	ITF Port El Kantaoui, Tunisia	W10	Hard	(Republic of Ireland) Jenny Claffey	(India) Eetee Maheta (Russia) Greta Mokrousova	6–4, 6–2
Win	4–5	Oct 2016	ITF Santa Margherita di Pula, Italy	W25	Clay	(Italy) Camilla Rosatello	(Italy) Cristiana Ferrando (Slovakia) Vivien Juhászová	6–1, 3–6, [10–6]
Loss	4–6	Jul 2017	ITF Darmstadt, Germany	W25	Clay	(Egypt) Sandra Samir	(Romania) Laura Ioana Andrei (Czech Republic) Anastasia Zarycká	6–4, 6–7^{(5)}, [3–10]
Loss	4–7	May 2019	Wiesbaden Open, Germany	W60	Clay	(Australia) Jaimee Fourlis	(Russia) Anna Blinkova (Belgium) Yanina Wickmayer	3–6, 6–4, [3–10]
Loss	4–8	Aug 2019	Verbier Open, Switzerland	W25	Clay	(Turkey) İpek Soylu	(Switzerland) Xenia Knoll (Switzerland) Simona Waltert	4–6, 3–6

== Fed Cup/Billie Jean King Cup participation ==
=== Singles ===
Edition	Stage	Date	Location	Against	Surface	Opponent	W–L	Score
2009	Z3 R/R	21 Apr 2009	Marsa, Malta	Norway	Hard	Ulrikke Eikeri	L	1–6, 4–6
2009	Z3 R/R	22 Apr 2009	Marsa, Malta	Armenia	Hard	Anna Movsisyan	L	5–7, 6–7^{(7–9)}
2009	Z3 R/R	23 Apr 2009	Marsa, Malta	Egypt	Hard	Nihal Tarek-Saleh	W	6–1, 6–4
2009	Z3 R/R	24 Apr 2009	Marsa, Malta	Iceland	Hard	Sandra Kristjánsdóttir	W	6–1, 6–0
2009	Z3 R/R	25 Apr 2009	Marsa, Malta	Moldova	Hard	Olga Terteac	W	6–3, 6–2
2010	Z2 R/R	28 Apr 2010	Yerevan, Armenia	Greece	Hard	Anna Gerasimou	L	2–6, 2–6
2010	Z2 R/R	30 Apr 2010	Yerevan, Armenia	South Africa	Hard	Christi Potgieter	L	3–6, 0–6
2013	Z3 R/R	8 May 2013	Chișinău, Moldova	Madagascar	Clay	Sandra Andriamarosoa	W	6–1, 6–1
2013	Z3 R/R	9 May 2013	Chișinău, Moldova	Norway	Clay	Melanie Stokke	W	6–3, 6–0
2013	Z3 P/O	11 May 2013	Chișinău, Moldova	Denmark	Clay	Maria Jespersen	W	6–4, 6–2
2014	Z2 R/R	16 Apr 2014	Šiauliai, Lithuania	Montenegro	Hard (i)	Nina Kalezić	W	6–1, 6–0
2014	Z2 R/R	17 Apr 2014	Šiauliai, Lithuania	Lithuania	Hard (i)	Akvilė Paražinskaitė	W	6–4, 6–2
2014	Z2 R/R	18 Apr 2014	Šiauliai, Lithuania	Finland	Hard (i)	Emma Laine	L	6–4, 1–6, 5–7
2014	Z2 P/O	19 Apr 2014	Šiauliai, Lithuania	(Bosnia and Herzegovina) BiH	Hard (i)	Dea Herdželaš	W	7–5, 6–4
2015	Z1 R/R	4 Feb 2015	Budapest, Hungary	(United Kingdom) Great Britain	Hard (i)	Johanna Konta	L	0–6, 0–6
2015	Z1 R/R	5 Feb 2015	Budapest, Hungary	Ukraine	Hard (i)	Kateryna Kozlova	L	1–6, 1–6
2015	Z1 P/O	7 Feb 2015	Budapest, Hungary	Portugal	Hard (i)	Maria João Koehler	L	3–6, 0–6
2016	Z2 R/R	13 Apr 2016	Cairo, Egypt	(Bosnia and Herzegovina) BiH	Clay	Ema Burgić Bucko	L	3–6, 1–6
2016	Z2 R/R	14 Apr 2016	Cairo, Egypt	Austria	Clay	Barbara Haas	W	1–6, 6–4, 6–3
2016	Z2 R/R	15 Apr 2016	Cairo, Egypt	Egypt	Clay	Lamis Alhussein Abdel Aziz	W	6–2, 6–2

=== Doubles ===
Edition	Stage	Date	Location	Against	Surface	Partner	Opponents	W/L	Score
2009	Z3 R/R	21 Apr 2009	Marsa, Malta	Norway	Hard	Marina Novak	Helene Auensen; Ulrikke Eikeri	W	0–6, 6–1, [10–8]
2009	Z3 R/R	22 Apr 2009	Marsa, Malta	Armenia	Hard	Marina Novak	Anna Movsisyan; Liudmila Nikoyan	L	3–6, 1–6
2009	Z3 R/R	23 Apr 2009	Marsa, Malta	Egypt	Hard	Marina Novak	Magy Aziz; Nihal Tarek-Saleh	W	7–6^{(9–7)}, 5–7, [11–9]
2009	Z3 R/R	24 Apr 2009	Marsa, Malta	Iceland	Hard	Marina Novak	Sandra Kristjánsdóttir; Eirdís Ragnarsdóttir	W	6–0, 6–1
2009	Z3 R/R	25 Apr 2009	Marsa, Malta	Moldova	Hard	Marina Novak	Olga Terteac; Olga Zaicenco	W	6–2, 6–1
2010	Z2 R/R	30 Apr 2010	Yerevan, Armenia	South Africa	Hard	Marina Novak	Christi Potgieter; Chanel Simmonds	L	6–7^{(0–7)}, 3–6
2013	Z3 R/R	8 May 2013	Chișinău, Moldova	Madagascar	Clay	Stephanie Vogt	Hariniony Andrimananarivo; Nantenaina Ramalalaharivololona	W	6–3, 6–4
2013	Z3 R/R	9 May 2013	Chișinău, Moldova	Norway	Clay	Stephanie Vogt	Andrea Raaholt; Melanie Stokke	W	6–0, 6–0
2013	Z3 P/O	11 May 2013	Chișinău, Moldova	Denmark	Clay	Stephanie Vogt	Malou Ejdesgaard; Mai Grage	W	6–3, 6–2
2014	Z2 R/R	16 Apr 2014	Šiauliai, Lithuania	Montenegro	Hard (i)	Stephanie Vogt	Tamara Bojanić; Nikoleta Bulatović	W	6–0, 6–1
2014	Z2 R/R	17 Apr 2014	Šiauliai, Lithuania	Lithuania	Hard (i)	Stephanie Vogt	Justina Mikulskytė; Akvilė Paražinskaitė	W	6–1, 6–4
2014	Z2 R/R	18 Apr 2014	Šiauliai, Lithuania	Finland	Hard (i)	Stephanie Vogt	Emma Laine; Piia Suomalainen	W	6–3, 7–5
2015	Z1 R/R	4 Feb 2015	Budapest, Hungary	(United Kingdom) Great Britain	Hard (i)	Stephanie Vogt	Jocelyn Rae; Anna Smith	L	1–6, 2–6
2015	Z1 R/R	5 Feb 2015	Budapest, Hungary	Ukraine	Hard (i)	Lynn Zund	Olga Savchuk; Lesia Tsurenko	L	2–6, 1–6
2016	Z2 R/R	13 Apr 2016	Cairo, Egypt	(Bosnia and Herzegovina) BIH	Clay	Stephanie Vogt	Ema Burgić Bucko; Anita Husarić	W	7–6^{(11)}, 6–4
2016	Z2 R/R	14 Apr 2016	Cairo, Egypt	Austria	Clay	Stephanie Vogt	Julia Grabher; Sandra Klemenschits	W	7–5, 6–7^{(5–7)}, 6–4
2016	Z2 R/R	15 Apr 2016	Cairo, Egypt	Egypt	Clay	Stephanie Vogt	Laila Elnimr; Sandra Samir	L	0–6, 6–7^{(3)}
