= Angella Okutoyi =

Kenyan tennis player (born 2004)

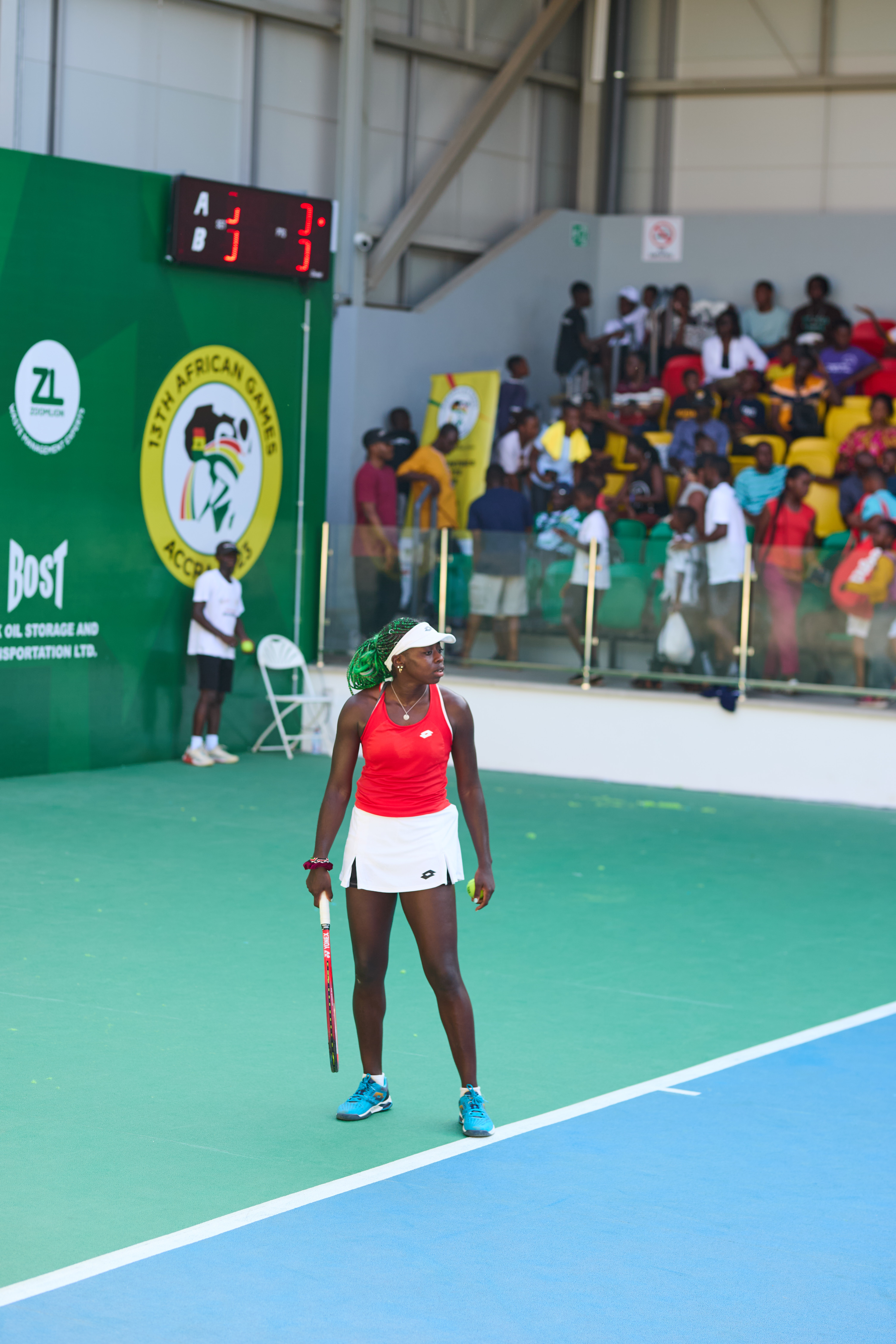
- Country (sports): Kenya
- Born: 29 January 2004 (age 22) Nairobi, Kenya
- Height: 1.73 m (5 ft 8 in)
- Plays: Right (two-handed backhand)
- College: Auburn University
- Prize money: $52,086

Singles
- Career record: 70–40
- Career titles: 4 ITF
- Highest ranking: No. 414 (19 January 2026)
- Current ranking: No. 515 (27 July 2026)

Doubles
- Career record: 85–20
- Career titles: 1 WTA 125, 18 ITF
- Highest ranking: No. 223 (19 January 2026)
- Current ranking: No. 236 (27 July 2026)

Team competitions
- Fed Cup: 16–8
Medal record
Representing Kenya
Women's tennis
African Games
Gold medal – first place	2023 Accra	Singles
Silver medal – second place	2023 Accra	Doubles
World University Games
Silver medal – second place	2025 Rhine-Ruhr	Mixed doubles
- Last updated on: 31 July 2026.

Angella Okutoyi (born 29 January 2004) is a Kenyan professional tennis player. She has a career-high singles ranking by the WTA of 414, reached on 19 January 2026, and a doubles ranking of No. 223, also achieved on 19 January 2026.

Okutoyi became the first Kenyan to win a major title at the girls’ juniors Wimbledon event, partnering Rose Marie Nijkamp. At the 2022 Australian Open, Okutoyi became the first representative of Kenya to win a girls’ junior singles major match.

In the 2023 African Games, she claimed the gold medal, after defeating Lamis Alhussein Abdel Aziz in the final. In the semifinals, she upset the top seed and world No. 70, Mayar Sherif. She then partnered with Cynthia Cheruto Wanjala to win silver in doubles losing the final to Sandra Samir and Merna Refaat. Okutoyi became only the second Kenyan player to win gold at the African games after Jane Davies-Doxzon achieved the feat in 1978.

On the ITF Circuit, she has won four singles and 15 doubles titles. Playing for Kenya Billie Jean King Cup team, Okutoyi has a win/loss record of 16–8.

== Personal life ==
Okutoyi and her sister were raised by their grandmother Mary as their mother died in childbirth. Her sister Roselinda Asumwa is also a tennis player, playing ITF futures and local tournaments.

== Career ==
=== Juniors ===
Angella participated in the 2022 Australian Open bracket. She defeated Italian qualifier Federica Urgesi in three sets in the first round, and she continued her form against Australian qualifier Zara Larke in the second round, winning in three sets. She lost her third round match against Serbian player Lola Radivojević, 3–6, 2–6, but her performance made her the first Kenyan in the world to progress to a third round in a major. At Wimbledon, Okutoyi won the girls' doubles title with Rose Marie Nijkamp.

=== Professional ===
Okutoyi became the first Kenyan player to win an ITF singles title when she defeated Isabella Harvison in the final at the W15 Monastir in July 2023. She was also the first player from her country to win any professional singles championship since Paul Wekesa claimed the Andorra Challenger in 1994.

She won her second ITF title at the W25 Nairobi in December 2023, defeating Lena Papadakis in the final.

== WTA 125 Finals ==
=== Doubles: 1 (title) ===
Result	W–L	Date	Tournament	Surface	Partner	Opponents	Score
Win	1–0	Nov 2026	Angola Ladies Open, Angola	Hard	(Burundi) Sada Nahimana	(Poland) Martyna Kubka (Lithuania) Justina Mikulskytė	6–4, 6–4

== ITF Circuit finals ==
=== Singles: 8 (4 titles, 4 runner-ups) ===
Legend W25/35 tournaments (3–1) W15 tournaments (1–2)	Finals by surface Hard (1–0) Clay (3–3)

Result	W–L	Date	Tournament	Tier	Surface	Opponent	Score
Loss	0–1	Nov 2022	ITF Nairobi, Kenya	W15	Clay	(Germany) Emily Seibold	3–6, 2–6
Win	1–1	Jul 2023	ITF Monastir, Tunisia	W15	Hard	(United States) Isabella Harvison	6–2, 7–6^{(2)}
Win	2–1	Dec 2023	ITF Nairobi, Kenya	W25	Clay	(Germany) Lena Papadakis	6–3, 1–6, 6–1
Loss	2–2	Jan 2025	ITF Nairobi, Kenya	W35	Clay	(Chinese Taipei) Joanna Garland	1–6, 4–6
Loss	2–3	Jun 2025	ITF Bolszewo, Poland	W15	Clay	(Belgium) Amelie Van Impe	6–7^{(3)}, 6–0, 2–6
Win	3–3	Dec 2025	ITF Nairobi, Kenya	W35	Clay	(Italy) Martina Colmegna	6–3, 3–6, 6–3
Win	4–3	Jan 2026	ITF Nairobi, Kenya	W35	Clay	(Italy) Martina Colmegna	6–3, 7–6^{(3)}
Loss	4–4	Aug 2026	ITF Verbier, Switzerland	W35	Clay	(Serbia) Anastasija Cvetković	4–6, 3–6

=== Doubles: 26 (18 titles, 8 runner-ups) ===
Legend W100 tournaments (1–1) W75 tournaments (1–0) W50 tournaments (3–1) W25/35 tournaments (8–3) W15 tournaments (5–3)	Finals by surface Hard (5–5) Clay (13–3)

Result	W–L	Date	Tournament	Tier	Surface	Partner	Opponents	Score
Win	1–0	Nov 2022	ITF Nairobi, Kenya	W15	Clay	(India) Smriti Bhasin	(India) Sharmada Balu (United States) Sabastiani Leon	6–3, 7–5
Win	2–0	Jul 2023	ITF Monastir, Tunisia	W15	Hard	(France) Beverley Nyangon	(Italy) Samira de Stefano (Italy) Gaia Parravicini	6–4, 3–6, [10–2]
Loss	2–1	Oct 2023	ITF Jackson, United States	W15	Hard	(United States) Adeline Flach	(Chinese Taipei) Hsu Chieh-yu (Ukraine) Anita Sahdiieva	5–7, 3–6
Loss	2–2	Dec 2023	ITF Nairobi, Kenya	W25	Clay	(Japan) Nagomi Higashitani	(Sweden) Fanny Östlund (Ukraine) Valeriya Strakhova	4–6, 6–7^{(5)}
Win	3–2	Dec 2023	ITF Nairobi, Kenya	W25	Clay	(Burundi) Sada Nahimana	(United States) Jessie Aney (Germany) Lena Papadakis	6–4, 3–6, [10–7]
Win	4–2	May 2024	ITF Monastir, Tunisia	W15	Hard	(Egypt) Merna Refaat	(China) Liu Le Yi (China) Xu Jiayu	6–2, 6–2
Win	5–2	Jul 2024	ITF Casablanca, Morocco	W15	Clay	(Republic of Ireland) Celine Simunyu	(Spain) Judith Hernandez Miranda (Mexico) Claudia Sofia Martinez Solis	6–1, 6–1
Loss	5–3	Oct 2024	ITF Hilton Head Island, US	W35	Hard	(Egypt) Merna Refaat	(United States) Fiona Crawley (United States) Makenna Jones	2–6, 7–6^{(5)}, [7-10]
Loss	5–4	Nov 2024	ITF Lincoln, US	W15	Hard (i)	(Egypt) Merna Refaat	(United States) Savannah Broadus (United States) Carolyn Campana	6–4, 3–6, [2–10]
Win	6–4	Jan 2025	ITF Nairobi, Kenya	W35	Clay	(Burundi) Sada Nahimana	(Netherlands) Demi Tran (Netherlands) Lian Tran	6–3, 6–3
Win	7–4	Jun 2025	ITF Troisdorf, Germany	W50	Clay	(United States) Rasheeda McAdoo	(Germany) Josy Daems (Ukraine) Anastasiia Firman	6–1, 6–1
Win	8–4	Jun 2025	ITF Madrid, Spain	W15	Clay	(Italy) Sofia Rocchetti	(Israel) Mika Buchnik (Argentina) Sol Ailin Larraya Guidi	6–2, 6–3
Loss	8–5	Jun 2025	ITF Bolszewo, Poland	W15	Clay	(Slovakia) Salma Drugdová	(Netherlands) Rikke de Koning (Belgium) Amelie Van Impe	6–7^{(7)}, 6–3, [7–10]
Win	9–5	Jul 2025	ITF Aschaffenburg, Germany	W50	Clay	(United States) Rasheeda McAdoo	(Germany) Laura Boehner (Switzerland) Chelsea Fontenel	1–6, 6–2, [10–7]
Win	10–5	Sep 2025	Berkeley Tennis Challenge, US	W35	Hard	(United States) Rasheeda McAdoo	(Italy) Francesca Pace (Poland) Zuzanna Pawlikowska	7–6^{(2)}, 6–4
Loss	10–6	Oct 2025	Tennis Classic of Macon, US	W100	Hard	(United States) Rasheeda McAdoo	(United States) Eryn Cayetano (United States) Ayana Akli	7–6^{(4)}, 2–6, [14–16]
Win	11–6	Nov 2025	ITF Orlando, US	W35	Clay	(Italy) Francesca Pace	(United States) Allura Zamarripa (United States) Maribella Zamarripa	3–6, 6–4, [14–12]
Win	12–6	Dec 2025	ITF Nairobi, Kenya	W35	Clay	(Poland) Zuzanna Pawlikowska	(France) Alyssa Réguer (China) Ren Yufei	6–2, 7–5
Win	13–6	Jan 2026	ITF Nairobi, Kenya	W35	Clay	(Netherlands) Demi Tran	(France) Alyssa Réguer (China) Ren Yufei	6–2, 5–7, [10–4]
Win	14–6	Jul 2026	SanLucar Open, Germany	W100	Clay	(United States) Rasheeda McAdoo	(Serbia) Elena Milovanović (Slovenia) Kristina Novak	6–3, 6–3
Win	15–6	Jul 2026	ITF Nottingham, United Kingdom	W50	Hard	(United Kingdom) Brooke Black	(United Kingdom) Victoria Allen (United Kingdom) Amelia Rajecki	w/o
Loss	15–7	Aug 2026	ITF Roehampton, United Kingdom	W35	Hard	(United Kingdom) Brooke Black	(United Kingdom) Emily Appleton (United Kingdom) Ella McDonald	5–7, 6–7^{(2)}
Win	16–7	Aug 2026	ITF Verbier, Switzerland	W35	Clay	(Denmark) Emma Kamper	(Serbia) Anastasija Cvetković (Switzerland) Sarina Schnyder	6–4, 4–6, [10–7]
Win	17–7	Aug 2026	ITF Verbier, Switzerland	W35	Clay	(France) Tiphanie Lemaître	(Greece) Valentini Grammatikopoulou (Ukraine) Valeriya Strakhova	6–4, 6–7^{(3)}, [10–5]
Loss	17–8	Sep 2026	ITF Santa Margherita di Pula, Italy	W35	Clay	(Ukraine) Daria Yesypchuk	(Czech Republic) Alena Kovačková (Germany) Joëlle Steur	3–6, 1–6
Win	18–8	Oct 2026	GB Pro-Series Glasgow, United Kingdom	W75	Hard (i)	(United Kingdom) Savannah Dada-Mascoll	(Estonia) Elena Malygina (United Kingdom) Amelia Rajecki	6–3, 6–3

== Junior Grand Slam tournament finals ==
=== Doubles: 1 (title) ===
Result	Year	Tournament	Surface	Partner	Opponents	Score
Win	2022	Wimbledon	Grass	(Netherlands) Rose Marie Nijkamp	(Canada) Kayla Cross (Canada) Victoria Mboko	3–6, 6–4, [11-9]

== ITF Junior finals ==
Category G1
Category G2
Category G3
Category G4
Category G5

=== Singles: 9 (6 titles, 3 runner-ups) ===
Result	No.	Date	Location	Surface	Opponent	Score
Loss	1.	3 February 2018	Nairobi, Kenya	Clay	(Slovenia) Metka Komac	1–6, 3–6
Win	1.	30 June 2018	Kigali, Rwanda	Clay	(India) Smriti Bhasin	6–4, 6–3
Loss	2.	6 July 2019	Nairobi, Kenya	Clay	(India) Sarah Dev	4–6, 3–6
Win	2.	13 July 2019	Nairobi, Kenya	Clay	(Burundi) Aisha Niyonkuru	4–6, 6–3, 6–2
Win	3.	16 November 2019	Nairobi, Kenya	Clay	(Burundi) Aisha Niyonkuru	6–1, 6–4
Loss	3.	30 November 2019	Nairobi, Kenya	Clay	(Burundi) Aisha Niyonkuru	3–6, 6–7
Win	4.	22 January 2021	Nairobi, Kenya	Clay	(Republic of Ireland) Celine Simunyu	6–3, 6–2
Win	5.	29 January 2021	Nairobi, Kenya	Clay	(Hungary) Luca Udvardy	6–1, 6–4
Win	6.	26 November 2021	Sousse, Tunisia	Hard	(Morocco) Aya El Aouni	6–3, 6–3

=== Doubles: 16 (11 titles, 5 runner-ups) ===
Result	No.	Date	Location	Surface	Partner	Opponents	Score
Loss	1.	25 November 2017	Nairobi, Kenya	Clay	(Madagascar) Mially Ranaivo	(Gabon) Célestine Avomo Ella (Burundi) Aisha Niyonkuru	2–6, 4–6
Win	1.	30 June 2018	Kigali, Rwanda	Clay	(Burundi) Aisha Niyonkuru	(India) Smriti Bhasin (India) Bhakti Parwani	6–4, 6–2
Win	2.	26 January 2019	Nairobi, Kenya	Clay	(Burundi) Aisha Niyonkuru	(Cameroon) Anna Lorie Lemongo Toumbou (Morocco) Salma Loudili	6–3, 6–2
Loss	2.	9 February 2019	Nairobi, Kenya	Clay	(Burundi) Aisha Niyonkuru	(Madagascar) Narindra Corrine Ranaivo (Chinese Taipei) Tsao Chia-yi	6–4, 6–7, [6–10]
Win	3.	7 April 2019	Hammamet, Tunisia	Clay	(Burundi) Aisha Niyonkuru	(Tunisia) Sarah Lisa Aubertin (Tunisia) Ferdaous Bahri	7–6, 7–5
Win	4.	6 July 2019	Nairobi, Kenya	Clay	(Burundi) Aisha Niyonkuru	(India) Sarah Dev (Burundi) Hoziane Kitambala	7–6, 6–4
Win	5.	13 July 2019	Nairobi, Kenya	Clay	(Burundi) Aisha Niyonkuru	(India) Sarah Dev (Burundi) Hoziane Kitambala	6–1, 6–1
Win	6.	16 November 2019	Nairobi, Kenya	Clay	(Burundi) Aisha Niyonkuru	(France) Alyssa Reguer (Republic of Ireland) Celine Simunyu	6–1, 6–4
Win	7.	23 November 2019	Nairobi, Kenya	Clay	(Burundi) Aisha Niyonkuru	(Madagascar) Mially Ranaivo (Iran) Meshkatolzahra Safi	6–4, 6–4
Win	8.	30 November 2019	Nairobi, Kenya	Clay	(Burundi) Aisha Niyonkuru	(Egypt) Maria Charl (Egypt) Nathalie Mokhtar	6–2, 7–5
Loss	3.	22 January 2021	Nairobi, Kenya	Clay	(Iran) Meshkatolzahra Safi	(Russia) Olga Mishenina (Germany) Luca Victoria Vocke	6–7, 6–4, [8–10]
Win	9.	22 January 2021	Nairobi, Kenya	Clay	(Iran) Meshkatolzahra Safi	(Russia) Olga Mishenina (United Kingdom) Maria Ustic	6–0, 6–3
Win	10.	20 August 2021	Cairo, Egypt	Clay	(Egypt) Jermine Sherif	(Morocco) Aya El Aouni (Romania) Briana Szabó	6–0, 2–6, [10–2]
Win	11.	27 August 2021	Cairo, Egypt	Clay	(Egypt) Jermine Sherif	(Russia) Violetta Borodina (Ukraine) Daria Yesypchuk	6–4, 4–6, [10–4]
Loss	4.	3 September 2021	Cairo, Egypt	Clay	(Belgium) Amelia Waligora	(Germany) Carolina Kuhl (Russia) Maria Sholokhova	2–6, 4–6
Loss	5.	20 November 2021	Sousse, Tunisia	Hard	(Tunisia) Feryel Ben Hassen	(Russia) Ekaterina Khayrutdinova (Russia) Kira Pavlova	3–6, 5–7

== Billie Jean King Cup participation ==
=== Singles (16–3) ===
Edition	Round	Date	Location	Against	Opponent	W/L	Score
2018 Fed Cup	Europe/Africa Zone	16 April 2018	Tunis, Tunisia	Finland	(Finland) Mia Eklund	L	0–6, 2–6
2018 Fed Cup	Europe/Africa Zone	17 April 2018	Tunis, Tunisia	South Africa	(South Africa) Chanel Simmonds	L	2–6, 2–6
2018 Fed Cup	Europe/Africa Zone	18 April 2018	Tunis, Tunisia	Montenegro	(Montenegro) Anja Draskovic	L	4–6, 6–4, 4–6
2018 Fed Cup	Europe/Africa Zone	19 April 2026	Tunis, Tunisia	Uganda	(Uganda) Winnie Birungi	W	6–0, 6–0
2023 BJK Cup	Europe/Africa Zone	12 June 2023	Nairobi, Kenya	Morocco	(Morocco) Malak El Allami	W	7–5, 6–3
2023 BJK Cup	Europe/Africa Zone	13 June 2023	Nairobi, Kenya	Botswana	(Botswana) Chelsey Chakanyuka	W	6–1, 6–2
2023 BJK Cup	Europe/Africa Zone	14 June 2023	Nairobi, Kenya	Uganda	(Uganda) Patience Athieno	W	6–0, 6–0
2023 BJK Cup	Europe/Africa Zone	15 June 2023	Nairobi, Kenya	Namibia	(Namibia) Liniques Theron	W	6–1, 6–0
2023 BJK Cup	Europe/Africa Zone	16 June 2023	Nairobi, Kenya	Nigeria	(Nigeria) Adesuwa Osabuohien	W	6–2, 6–0
2023 BJK Cup	Europe/Africa Zone	17 June 2023	Nairobi, Kenya	Zimbabwe	(Zimbabwe) Sasha Natalie Chimedza	W	6–3, 6–4
2024 BJK Cup	Europe/Africa Zone	10 June 2024	Nairobi, Kenya	Mauritius	(Mauritius) Tejaswini Jesoo	W	6–0, 6–0
2024 BJK Cup	Europe/Africa Zone	11 June 2024	Nairobi, Kenya	Tunisia	(Tunisia) Chiraz Bechri	W	6–3, 7–6
2024 BJK Cup	Europe/Africa Zone	12 June 2024	Nairobi, Kenya	Burundi	(Burundi) Sada Nahimana	W	6–4, 6–4
2024 BJK Cup	Europe/Africa Zone	13 June 2024	Nairobi, Kenya	Nigeria	(Nigeria) Adesuwa Osabuohien	W	6–3, 6–3
2024 BJK Cup	Europe/Africa Zone	14 June 2024	Nairobi, Kenya	South Africa	(South Africa) Isabella Kruger	L	6–7, 3–6
2025 BJK Cup	Europe/Africa	4 August 2025	Windhoek, Namibia	Tunisia	(Tunisia) Mouna Bouzgarrou	W	6–2 6–4
2025 BJK Cup	Europe/Africa	5 August 2025	Windhoek, Namibia	Algeria	(Algeria) Bochra Rehab Mebarki	W	6–0, 6–2
2025 BJK Cup	Europe/Africa	6 August 2025	Windhoek, Namibia	Zimbabwe	(Zimbabwe) Sasha Natalie Chimedza	W	6–4, 6–4
2025 BJK Cup	Europe/Africa	7 August 2025	Windhoek, Namibia	Botswana	(Botswana) Ekua Youri	W	6–2, 5–7, 7–6 ^{(5)}
2025 BJK Cup	Europe/Africa	9 August 2025	Windhoek, Namibia	Morocco	(Morocco) Yasmine Kabbaj	W	6–2, 6–4
