= Agnė Čepelytė =

Lithuanian tennis player (born 1995)

- Country (sports): Lithuania
- Born: 1 December 1995 (age 29); Panevėžys, Lithuania
- Prize money: $3,814

Singles
- Career record: 22–26
- Career titles: 0
- Highest ranking: No. 1089 (25 May 2015)

Doubles
- Career record: 15–16
- Career titles: 1 ITF
- Highest ranking: No. 748 (18 May 2015)

Team competitions
- Fed Cup: 2–2

Agnė Čepelytė (born 1 December 1995) is a Lithuanian former tennis player.

In her career, she won one doubles title on the ITF Women's Circuit. On 25 May 2015, she reached her best singles ranking of world No. 1089, and on 18 May 2015, she peaked at No. 748 in the WTA doubles rankings.

Playing for Lithuania Fed Cup team, Čepelytė has a win–loss record of 2–2.

== ITF finals ==
=== Doubles (1–1) ===
Legend $50,000 tournaments $25,000 tournaments $10,000 tournaments	Finals by surface Hard (0–1) Clay (1–0) Carpet (0–0)

Result	No.	Date	Tournament	Surface	Partner	Opponents	Score
Win	1.	9 August 2014	Telavi Open, Georgia	Clay	(Lithuania) Justina Mikulskytė	(Belgium) India Maggen (Slovakia) Lenka Wienerová	6–1, 7–5
Loss	1.	20 September 2014	ITF Antalya, Turkey	Hard	(Lithuania) Justina Mikulskytė	(Japan) Yumi Nakano (Japan) Kotomi Takahata	1–6, 5–7
