= Justina Mikulskytė =

Lithuanian tennis player (born 1996)

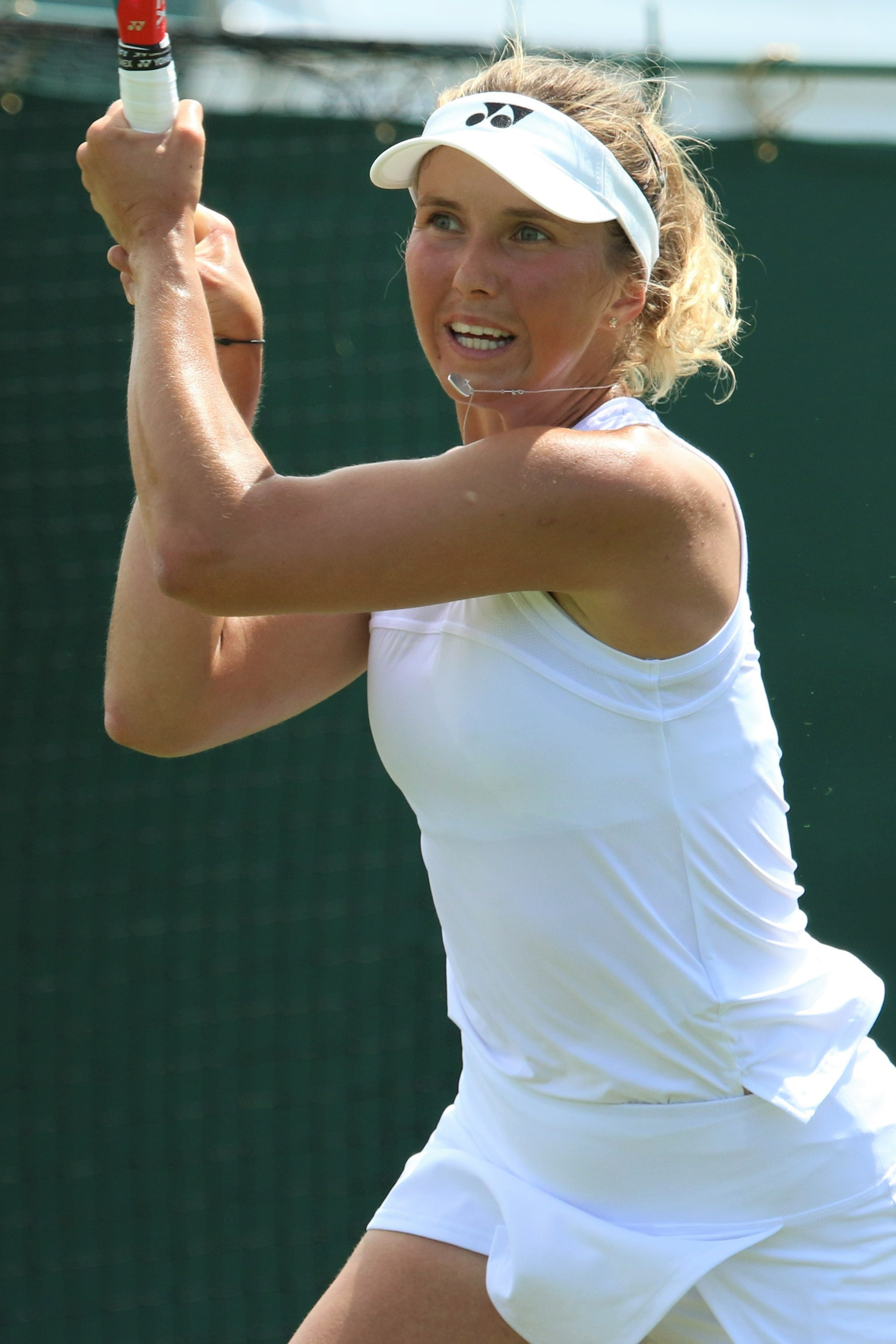
- Mikulskytė at the 2022 Wimbledon Championships
- Country (sports): Lithuania
- Born: 6 February 1996 (age 30) Šiauliai, Lithuania
- Plays: Right-handed (two-handed backhand)
- College: Kentucky
- Prize money: $519,955

Singles
- Career record: 317–233
- Career titles: 8 ITF
- Highest ranking: No. 198 (11 August 2025)
- Current ranking: No. 229 (16 November 2026)

Grand Slam singles results
- Australian Open: Q2 (2026)
- French Open: Q3 (2025)
- Wimbledon: Q2 (2026)
- US Open: Q2 (2025)

Doubles
- Career record: 246–136
- Career titles: 27 ITF
- Highest ranking: No. 141 (6 October 2025)
- Current ranking: No. 233 (16 November 2026)

Team competitions
- Fed Cup: 24–16
- Last updated on: 21 November 2026.

Justina Mikulskytė (born 6 February 1996) is a Lithuanian professional tennis player. She has career-high rankings of No. 198 in singles, achieved on 11 August 2025, and world No. 141 in doubles, achieved on 6 October 2025.

Mikulskytė played collegiate tennis for the Kentucky Wildcats and in 2019 she made her postseason debut at the NCAA Division I Tennis Championships.

== Early life ==
Mikulskytė was born in Šiauliai. At the age of eight, she began training under coach Rita Romencovienė. She attended Didždvario gimnazija in her hometown. In 2011, she and Akvilė Paražinskaitė won the bronze medal in girls' doubles at the European Youth Summer Olympic Festival.

== Career ==
=== 2019-2021 ===
In October 2019, she won both the singles and doubles titles at the W15 Soho Square Egypt in Sharm El Sheikh and in November reached the semifinals of the W15 Magic Tours series in Monastir, Tunisia.

In May 2021, she won the W15 Torneig Arcadi Manchón in Santa Margarida de Montbui, defeating Celia Cerviño Ruiz in the final. She also won the doubles title at the W25 Torneig Internacional Femení in Platja d'Aro with Oana Georgeta Simion; they defeated Alexandra Eala and Oksana Selekhmeteva in the final. In January 2022, she won the W25 Rafa Nadal Academy World Tennis Tour event in Manacor, defeating Yuki Naito in the final. Later that year, she and Isabelle Haverlag won the doubles title at the Open de Seine-et-Marne and were runners-up at the Open Araba en Femenino.

=== 2024-2025 ===
In April 2024, she and Veronika Erjavec reached the doubles final of the Split Open, but lost to Valentini Grammatikopoulou and Prarthana Thombare. The following month, she and Christina Rosca won the doubles title at the Florida's Sports Coast Open, defeating Anna Rogers and Alana Smith in the final. Later that year, she won the singles title at the W50 in Saint-Palais-sur-Mer and the doubles title at the Tevlin Women's Challenger, partnering Jamie Loeb.

In February 2025, she and Magali Kempen won the doubles title at the W50+H Open in Mâcon. That June, she and Jessie Aney reached the doubles final of the Open de Biarritz, but lost to Irene Burillo and María Portillo Ramírez.

=== 2026: WTA Tour debut ===
Mikulskytė made her WTA Tour main-draw debut at the 2026 SP Open as a lucky loser.

== Grand Slam performance timeline ==
Key
W	F	SF	QF	#R	RR	Q#	DNQ	A	NH

(W) winner; (F) finalist; (SF) semifinalist; (QF) quarterfinalist; (#R) rounds 4, 3, 2, 1; (RR) round-robin stage; (Q#) qualification round; (DNQ) did not qualify; (A) absent; (NH) not held; (SR) strike rate (events won / competed); (W–L) win–loss record.
To avoid confusion and double counting, these charts are updated at the conclusion of a tournament or when the player's participation has ended.

Only main-draw results in WTA Tour, Grand Slam tournaments, Fed Cup/Billie Jean King Cup, Hopman Cup, United Cup and Olympic Games are included in win–loss records.

=== Singles ===
Tournament	2022	2023	2024	2025	2026	W–L
Australian Open	A	A	A	A	Q2	0–0
French Open	A	A	Q1	Q3	A	0–0
Wimbledon	Q1	A	Q1	Q1	Q2	0–0
US Open	A	A	A	Q2	A	0–0
Win–Loss	0–0	0–0	0–0	0–0	0–0	0–0

== WTA 125 finals ==
=== Doubles: 1 (runner-up) ===
Result	Date	Tournament	Surface	Partner	Opponents	Score
Loss	Nov 2026	Angola Ladies Open, Angola	Hard	(Poland) Martyna Kubka	(Burundi) Sada Nahimana (Kenya) Angella Okutoyi	4–6, 4–6

== ITF Circuit finals ==
=== Singles: 16 (8 titles, 8 runner-ups) ===
Legend W75 tournaments (0–2) W40/50 tournaments (2–2) W25/35 tournaments (3–2) W15 tournaments (3–2)	Finals by surface Hard (4–3) Clay (4–5)

Result	W–L	Date	Tournament	Tier	Surface	Opponent	Score
Loss	0–1	Jun 2019	ITF Amarante, Portugal	W15	Hard	(Republic of Ireland) Georgia Drummy	6–7^{(4)}, 3–6
Win	1–1	Sep 2019	ITF Bucha, Ukraine	W15	Clay	(Russia) Taisya Pachkaleva	7–5, 6–2
Win	2–1	Oct 2019	ITF Sharm El Sheikh, Egypt	W15	Hard	(Switzerland) Valentina Ryser	3–6, 6–4, 6–3
Win	3–1	May 2021	ITF Santa Margarita de Montbui, Spain	W15	Hard	(Spain) Celia Cerviño Ruiz	6–2, 6–0
Loss	3–2	Jul 2021	President's Cup, Kazakhstan	W25	Hard	(Russia) Anastasia Tikhonova	6–2, 5–7, 1–6
Win	4–2	Jan 2022	ITF Manacor, Spain	W25	Hard	(Japan) Yuki Naito	6–3, 6–3
Loss	4–3	Jun 2023	ITF La Marsa, Tunisia	W40	Hard	Jana Kolodynska	2–6, 0–2 ret.
Loss	4–4	Sep 2023	ITF Saint-Palais-sur-Mer, France	W40	Clay	(Bulgaria) Gergana Topalova	5–7, 7–5, 1–6
Loss	4–5	Dec 2023	ITF Mogi das Cruzes, Brazil	W25	Clay	(Portugal) Francisca Jorge	1–6, 1–6
Win	5–5	Mar 2024	ITF Gurugram, India	W35	Hard	(South Korea) Ku Yeon-woo	6–0, 6–1
Win	6–5	Sep 2024	ITF Saint-Palais-sur-Mer, France	W50	Clay	(Spain) Kaitlin Quevedo	7–5, 7–6^{(2)}
Win	7–5	Jan 2025	Porto Indoor, Portugal	W50+H	Hard (i)	(United States) Tyra Caterina Grant	6–7^{(2)}, 6–3, 6–2
Loss	7–6	Jul 2025	Open Araba en Femenino, Spain	W75	Hard	(Poland) Linda Klimovičová	6–0, 6–7^{(5)}, 0–6
Loss	7–7	Dec 2025	ITF Monastir, Tunisia	W15	Hard	(Malta) Francesca Curmi	5–7, 4–6
Win	8–7	May 2026	ITF Tumkur, India	W35	Hard	(Poland) Zuzanna Pawlikowska	1–0 ret.
Loss	8–8	Jul 2026	Open Araba en Femenino, Spain	W75	Hard	(Poland) Martyna Kubka	7–5, 3–6, 3–6

=== Doubles: 45 (27 titles, 18 runner-ups) ===
Legend W100 tournaments (1–1) W60/75 tournaments (5–4) W40/50 tournaments (4–1) W25/35 tournaments (8–8) W10/15 tournaments (9–4)	Finals by surface Hard (15–12) Clay (11–6) Carpet (1–0)

Result	W–L	Date	Tournament	Tier	Surface	Partner	Opponents	Score
Win	1–0	Aug 2014	Telavi Open, Georgia	10k	Clay	(Lithuania) Agnė Čepelytė	(Belgium) India Maggen (Slovakia) Lenka Wienerová	6–1, 7–5
Loss	1–1	Sep 2014	ITF Antalya, Turkey	10k	Hard	(Lithuania) Agnė Čepelytė	(Japan) Yumi Nakano (Japan) Kotomi Takahata	1–6, 5–7
Win	2–1	Jun 2019	ITF Madrid, Spain	W15	Hard	(United States) Christina Rosca	(Romania) Ioana Loredana Roșca (Bulgaria) Julia Terziyska	6–3, 6–7^{(8)}, [10–8]
Loss	2–2	Jul 2019	ITF Cancún, Mexico	W15	Hard	(France) Tiphanie Fiquet	(United States) Adriana Reami (United States) Anna Rogers	6–7^{(1)}, 4–6
Win	3–2	Sep 2019	ITF Vrnjačka Banja, Serbia	W15	Clay	(Croatia) Mariana Dražić	(Slovakia) Kristýna Hrabalová (Slovakia) Laura Svatíková	6–2, 7–6^{(5)}
Win	4–2	Oct 2019	ITF Sharm El Sheikh, Egypt	W15	Hard	(United States) Dasha Ivanova	(Slovakia) Romana Čisovská (Poland) Stefania Rogozińska Dzik	6–1, 7–5
Win	5–2	Oct 2019	ITF Sharm El Sheikh, Egypt	W15	Hard	(United States) Dasha Ivanova	(Slovakia) Katarína Kužmová (Ukraine) Anastasiya Poplavska	5–7, 6–4, [10–8]
Win	6–2	Nov 2019	ITF Monastir, Tunisia	W15	Hard	(Venezuela) Nadia Echeverría Alam	(Egypt) Lamis Alhussein Abdel Aziz (Gabon) Célestine Avomo Ella	7–6^{(6)}, 7–6^{(2)}
Win	7–2	Jan 2020	ITF Cancún, Mexico	W15	Hard	(Netherlands) Lian Tran	(Mexico) Victoria Rodríguez (United States) Sofia Sewing	6–2, 4–6, [10–7]
Win	8–2	Nov 2020	ITF Haabneeme, Estonia	W15	Hard (i)	(Netherlands) Lexie Stevens	(United Kingdom) Emily Appleton (Poland) Martyna Kubka	6–2, 6–1
Loss	8–3	Feb 2021	ITF Sharm El Sheikh, Egypt	W15	Hard	(Japan) Miharu Imanishi	(Czech Republic) Kristýna Lavičková (Czech Republic) Anna Sisková	6–7^{(0)}, 4–6
Win	9–3	May 2021	ITF Platja d'Aro, Spain	W25	Clay	(Romania) Oana Georgeta Simion	(Philippines) Alex Eala (Russia) Oksana Selekhmeteva	6–3, 7–5
Win	10–3	May 2021	ITF Santa Margarita de Montbui, Spain	W15	Hard	(Argentina) Victoria Bosio	(Spain) Celia Cerviño Ruiz (United Kingdom) Olivia Nicholls	4–6, 6–1, [10–7]
Loss	10–4	Jun 2021	ITF Vilnius, Lithuania	W15	Hard (i)	(Lithuania) Akvilė Paražinskaitė	(Russia) Ekaterina Makarova (Russia) Anna Morgina	2–6, 6–3, [2–10]
Win	11–4	Aug 2021	ITF Parnu, Estonia	W25	Clay	(Czech Republic) Anna Sisková	(India) Rutuja Bhosale (Belgium) Magali Kempen	6–7^{(5)}, 6–3, [10–5]
Loss	11–5	Aug 2021	ITF Ourense, Spain	W25	Hard	(Spain) Alba Carrillo Marin	(Chinese Taipei) Lee Ya-hsuan (Russia) Ekaterina Yashina	2–6, 3–6
Loss	11–6	Sep 2021	ITF Trieste, Italy	W25	Clay	(Australia) Olivia Tjandramula	(Romania) Andreea Prisacariu (Slovenia) Nika Radišić	5–7, 2–6
Win	12–6	Feb 2022	ITF Sharm El Sheikh, Egypt	W25	Hard	(Netherlands) Isabelle Haverlag	(Romania) Irina Fetecău (Switzerland) Simona Waltert	6–1, 6–2
Loss	12–7	Feb 2022	GB Pro-Series Glasgow, UK	W25	Hard (i)	(Russia) Valeria Savinykh	(United States) Quinn Gleason (United States) Catherine Harrison	4–6, 1–6
Win	13–7	Apr 2022	Open de Seine-et-Marne, France	W60	Hard (i)	(Netherlands) Isabelle Haverlag	Sofya Lansere; Oksana Selekhmeteva	6–4, 6–2
Win	14–7	May 2022	ITF Santa Margherita di Pula, Italy	W25	Clay	(Slovenia) Nika Radišić	(Spain) Leyre Romero Gormaz (Netherlands) Arantxa Rus	4–6, 7–5, [10–7]
Loss	14–8	Jul 2022	ITF Palma del Río, Spain	W25+H	Hard	(Spain) Celia Cerviño Ruiz	Valeria Savinykh (Hungary) Fanny Stollár	6–7^{(3)}, 2–6
Win	15–8	Jul 2022	ITF Corroios-Seixal, Portugal	W25	Hard	(Hong Kong) Cody Wong	(Chinese Taipei) Lee Ya-hsuan (Chinese Taipei) Wu Fang-hsien	6–2, 7–5
Loss	15–9	Jul 2022	Open Araba en Femenino, Spain	W60	Hard	(Netherlands) Isabelle Haverlag	Maria Bondarenko (Romania) Ioana Loredana Roșca	6–4, 4–6, [9–11]
Win	16–9	Aug 2022	ITF Pärnu, Estonia	W25	Clay	(Ukraine) Valeriya Strakhova	(Greece) Eleni Christofi (Bulgaria) Gergana Topalova	6–2, 4–6, [10–8]
Loss	16–10	Jan 2023	GB Pro-Series Loughborough, UK	W25	Hard (i)	(Netherlands) Bibiane Schoofs	(Slovakia) Viktória Morvayová (Czech Republic) Anna Sisková	3–6, 7–6^{(3)}, [6–10]
Win	17–10	Mar 2023	Open de Touraine, France	W25	Hard (i)	(Slovenia) Veronika Erjavec	(United States) Chiara Scholl (Bosnia and Herzegovina) Anita Wagner	6–4, 6–0
Win	18–10	Sep 2023	ITF Skopje, North Macedonia	W40	Clay	(Kazakhstan) Zhibek Kulambayeva	(Japan) Rina Saigo (Japan) Yukina Saigo	6–3, 6–4
Win	19–10	Oct 2023	ITF Santa Margherita di Pula, Italy	W25	Clay	(Slovenia) Veronika Erjavec	(Italy) Nuria Brancaccio (Italy) Angelica Moratelli	7–6^{(6)}, 6–0
Loss	19–11	Dec 2023	ITF Mogi das Cruzes, Brazil	W25	Clay	(Italy) Nicole Fossa Huergo	(Brazil) Ana Candiotto (Argentina) Melany Krywoj	2–6, 6–1, [6–10]
Win	20–11	Dec 2023	ITF Vacaria, Brazil	W60	Clay (i)	(Peru) Romina Ccuno	(Portugal) Francisca Jorge (Portugal) Matilde Jorge	6–2, 6–3
Loss	20–12	Feb 2024	ITF Gurugram, India	W35	Hard	(Sweden) Jacqueline Cabaj Awad	(Kazakhstan) Zhibek Kulambayeva (India) Ankita Raina	4–6, 2–6
Loss	20–13	Mar 2024	ITF Nagpur, India	W35	Clay	(South Korea) Ku Yeon-woo	(Romania) Irina Bara (Slovenia) Dalila Jakupović	7–6^{(8)}, 6–7^{(5)}, [7–10]
Loss	20–14	Apr 2024	Split Open, Croatia	W75	Clay	(Slovenia) Veronika Erjavec	(Greece) Valentini Grammatikopoulou (India) Prarthana Thombare	4–6, 1–6
Win	21–14	May 2024	Florida's Sports Coast Open, US	W75	Clay	(United States) Christina Rosca	(United States) Anna Rogers (United States) Alana Smith	6–4, 6–4
Loss	21–15	Sep 2024	ITF Saint-Palais-sur-Mer, France	W50	Clay	(Greece) Sapfo Sakellaridi	(France) Sarah Iliev (France) Emma Léné	6–7^{(5)}, 2–6
Win	22–15	Oct 2024	ITF Quinta do Lago, Portugal	W50	Hard	(Portugal) Matilde Jorge	(Belgium) Magali Kempen (Belgium) Lara Salden	2–6, 6–4, [14–12]
Win	23–15	Oct 2024	Toronto Challenger, Canada	W75	Hard (i)	(United States) Jamie Loeb	(France) Julie Belgraver (Netherlands) Jasmijn Gimbrère	6–2, 6–1
Win	24–15	Feb 2025	Mâcon Open, France	W50	Hard (i)	(Belgium) Magali Kempen	(Germany) Tayisiya Morderger (Germany) Yana Morderger	7–6^{(5)}, 6–2
Loss	24–16	Mar 2025	ITF Târgu Mureș, Romania	W75	Hard (i)	(United Kingdom) Madeleine Brooks	(Italy) Camilla Rosatello (Serbia) Nina Stojanović	6–7^{(1)}, 2–6
Loss	24–17	Jun 2025	Open de Biarritz, France	W100	Clay	(United States) Jessie Aney	(Spain) Irene Burillo (Mexico) María Portillo Ramírez	6–4, 1–6, [5–10]
Win	25–17	Jul 2025	Figueira da Foz Open, Portugal	W100	Hard	(Czech Republic) Aneta Laboutková	(Portugal) Francisca Jorge (Portugal) Matilde Jorge	6–4, 3–6, [10–6]
Win	26–17	Sep 2025	ITF Saint-Palais-sur-Mer, France	W50	Clay	(Switzerland) Naïma Karamoko	Polina Kaibekova (Netherlands) Demi Tran	6–1, 6–2
Win	27–17	Feb 2026	AK Ladies Open, Germany	W75	Carpet (i)	(Poland) Martyna Kubka	(Germany) Tessa Brockmann (Germany) Nastasja Schunk	6–1, 6–2
Loss	27–18	May 2026	Bratislava Open, Slovakia	W75	Clay	(Poland) Martyna Kubka	(Romania) Irina Bara (United Kingdom) Madeleine Brooks	5–7, 2–6

== National representation ==
=== Billie Jean King Cup ===
==== Singles (1–4) ====
Edition	Stage	Date	Location	Against	Surface	Opponent	W/L	Score
2012	Z3 R/R	Apr 2012	Cairo (EGY)	Tunisia	Clay	Nour Abbès	L	6–2, 2–6, 6–7^{(7)}
2013	Z2 R/R	Apr 2013	Ulcinj (MNE)	South Africa	Clay	Lynn Kiro	W	6–3, 6–1
2013	Z2 R/R	Apr 2013	Ulcinj (MNE)	Greece	Clay	Despina Papamichail	L	1–6, 1–6
2013	Z2 R/R	Apr 2013	Ulcinj (MNE)	Montenegro	Clay	Ana Veselinović	L	1–6, 6–1, 4–6
2013	Z2 P/O	Apr 2013	Ulcinj (MNE)	Tunisia	Clay	Nour Abbès	L	3–6, 4–6

==== Doubles (8–3) ====
Edition	Stage	Date	Location	Against	Surface	Partner	Opponents	W/L	Score
2012	Z3 R/R	Apr 2012	Cairo (EGY)	Namibia	Clay	Lina Stančiūtė	Lesedi Sheya Jacobs; Carita Moolman	W	6–2, 6–0
2012	Z3 R/R	Apr 2012	Cairo (EGY)	Moldova	Clay	Akvilė Paražinskaitė	Melisa Martinov; Alina Soltanici	W	6–0, 6–2
2012	Z3 R/R	Apr 2012	Cairo (EGY)	Egypt	Clay	Akvilė Paražinskaitė	Magy Aziz; Mora Eshak	W	6–3, 6–1
2012	Z3 R/R	Apr 2012	Cairo (EGY)	Cyprus	Clay	Akvilė Paražinskaitė	Joanna Nena Savva; Andria Tsaggaridou	W	5–7, 6–2, 6–1
2012	Z3 R/R	Apr 2012	Cairo (EGY)	Tunisia	Clay	Akvilė Paražinskaitė	Nour Abbès; Ons Jabeur	W	2–3 ret.
2012	Z3 P/O	Apr 2012	Cairo (EGY)	Morocco	Clay	Lina Stančiūtė	Fatima El Allami; Bahia Mouhtassine	W	6–4, 7–5
2013	Z2 R/R	Apr 2013	Ulcinj (MNE)	Greece	Clay	Lina Stančiūtė	Despina Papamichail; Despoina Vogasari	W	4–6, 6–0, 6–2
2014	Z2 R/R	Apr 2014	Šiauliai (LTU)	Finland	Hard (i)	Lina Stančiūtė	Emma Laine; Piia Suomalainen	L	6–7^{(4)}, 3–6
2014	Z2 R/R	Apr 2014	Šiauliai (LTU)	Liechtenstein	Hard (i)	Lina Stančiūtė	Kathinka von Deichmann; Stephanie Vogt	L	1–6, 4–6
2014	Z2 R/R	Apr 2014	Šiauliai (LTU)	Montenegro	Hard (i)	Agnė Čepelytė	Tamara Bojanić; Nikoleta Bulatović	W	6–0, 6–2
2014	Z2 P/O	Apr 2014	Šiauliai (LTU)	Egypt	Hard (i)	Lina Stančiūtė	Ola Abou Zekry; Mayar Sherif	L	5–7, 6–7^{(4)}
