= Squash at the 2011 Games of the Small States of Europe =

Squash at the 2011 Games of the Small States of Europe was held from 30 May – 6 June 2011.

== Medal summary ==
=== Men ===
Event	Gold	Silver	Bronze
Singles	Bradley Hindle (MLT)	Sanjay Raval (LUX)	Christian Billard (MON)
Singles	Bradley Hindle (MLT)	Sanjay Raval (LUX)	Marcel Rothmund (LIE)
Team	Malta; Carl Camilleri; Mark Lupi; Daniel Zammit Lewis; Joseph Desira; Bradley Hindle	Luxembourg; Keith Darlington; Marcel Kramer; Stéphane Ayache; Daniel Kaiser; Sanjay Raval	Liechtenstein; Markus Sulser; Finlay Sky Davey; Peter Maier; Linus Schnarwiler; Marcel Rothmund

=== Women ===
Event	Gold	Silver	Bronze
Singles	Dianne Desira (MLT)	Sandra Denis (LUX)	Vaso Karasava Hambides (CYP)
Singles	Dianne Desira (MLT)	Sandra Denis (LUX)	Anabelle Olivieri Munroe (MLT)
Team	Malta; Johanna Rizzo; Annabelle Olivieri Munroe; Dianne Desira	Cyprus; Femke Ellens; Christina Vrahimi; Vaso Karasava Hambides	Luxembourg; Claudia Mich; Francoise Donven; Sandra Denis

=== Medal table ===
Rank	Nation	Gold	Silver	Bronze	Total
1	Malta	4	0	1	5
2	Luxembourg	0	3	1	4
3	Cyprus	0	1	1	2
4	Liechtenstein	0	0	2	2
5	Monaco	0	0	1	1
Totals (5 entries)		4	4	6	14

== Men ==
=== Singles ===
First Round
(Monaco) P Ballerio	3	7	10
(Iceland) Halldorson	11	11	12
(Liechtenstein) L Schnarwiler	11	11	11
(Andorra) A Sánchez	5	7	5
(Cyprus) J Meletiou	7	2	5
(Monaco) C Billard	11	11	11
(Liechtenstein) M Rothmund	11	13	11	11
(Iceland) H Magnusson	3	11	13	3
(San Marino) D Franciosi	5	8	4
(Luxembourg) D Kaiser	11	11	11
(Cyprus) A Koufettas
(Malta) J Desira	w/o
(Andorra) Suárez	6	5	5
2	(Luxembourg) S Raval	11	11	11

Quarterfinals
1	(Malta) B Hindle	11	11	11
(Iceland) Halldorson	3	3	5
(Liechtenstein) L Schnarwiler	9	8	2
(Monaco) C Billard	11	11	11
(Liechtenstein) M Rothmund	11	11	11
(Luxembourg) D Kaiser	5	6	6
(Cyprus) A Koufettas	5	2	5
2	(Luxembourg) S Raval	11	11	11

Semifinals
1	(Malta) B Hindle	11	11	11
(Monaco) C Billard	5	6	2
(Liechtenstein) M Rothmund	10	4	11	8
2	(Luxembourg) S Raval	12	11	2	11

Final
1	(Malta) B Hindle	11	11	11
2	(Luxembourg) S Raval	1	8	4

=== Team ===
Team	GP	W	L	GF	GA
Malta	5	4	1	56	32
Luxembourg	5	4	1	54	39
Liechtenstein	5	4	1	53	39
Monaco	5	2	3	45	50
Iceland	5	1	4	39	59
Andorra	5	0	5	30	58

Date		Score		M1	M2	M3	M4	M5
30 May	Malta	4–1	Iceland	1–3	3–1	3–0	3–1	3–0
30 May	Liechtenstein	3–2	Andorra	0–3	3–0	1–3	3–0	3–0
30 May	Luxembourg	4–1	Monaco	3–0	1–3	3–0	3–1	3–2
31 May	Malta	4–1	Monaco	3–1	1–3	3–0	3–0	3–0
31 May	Liechtenstein	4–1	Iceland	2–3	3–1	3–2	3–0	3–2
31 May	Luxembourg	3–2	Andorra	1–3	1–3	3–2	3–0	3–0
31 May	Liechtenstein	4–1	Monaco	3–0	3–2	3–1	3–1	2–3
1 June	Iceland	4–1	Andorra	3–1	1–3	3–1	3–1	3–1
1 June	Malta	4–1	Luxembourg	3–2	3–1	3–2	1–3	3–0
1 June	Monaco	5–0	Andorra	3–0	3–0	3–1	3–2	3–0
1 June	Liechtenstein	2–3	Luxembourg	0–3	3–1	0–3	3–0	0–3
2 June	Malta	3–2	Andorra	0–3	0–3	3–0	3–0	3–0
2 June	Luxembourg	4–1	Iceland	3–1	3–2	3–0	0–3	3–0
2 June	Monaco	4–1	Iceland	1–3	3–1	3–2	3–0	3–1
2 June	Liechtenstein	3–2	Malta	3–2	3–0	0–3	3–0	0–3

== Women ==
=== Singles ===
First Round
(Liechtenstein) N Betchem	11	5	9	11	6
(Cyprus) C Vrahimi	7	11	11	5	11
(Iceland) R Jonsdottir	11	11	13
(Monaco) A Baldoni	6	3	11
(Luxembourg) F Donven	11	9	9	11	11
(Iceland) D Ivarsdottir	6	11	11	8	7
(Liechtenstein) Nestler-Schreiber	11	11	11
(Monaco) L Vada	5	7	4

Quarterfinals
1	(Malta) D Desira	11	11	11
(Cyprus) C Vrahimi	0	3	7
(Iceland) R Jonsdottir	7	8	7
(Cyprus) VK Hambides	11	11	11
(Malta) AO Munroe	11	11	11
(Luxembourg) F Donven	6	8	7
(Liechtenstein) Nestler-Schreiber	13	5	5	5
2	(Luxembourg) S Denis	11	11	11	11

Semifinals
1	(Malta) D Desira	11	11	11
(Cyprus) VK Hambides	4	6	6
(Malta) AO Munroe	5	11	8	2
2	(Luxembourg) S Denis	11	8	11	11

Final
1	(Malta) D Desira	11	11	11
2	(Luxembourg) S Denis	3	9	6

=== Team ===
Team	GP	W	L	GF	GA
Malta	5	5	0	45	3
Cyprus	5	4	1	33	23
Luxembourg	5	2	3	29	27
Liechtenstein	5	2	3	25	28
Iceland	5	2	2	21	30
Monaco	5	0	5	3	45

Date		Score		M1	M2	M3
30 May	Liechtenstein	1–2	Cyprus	1–3	3–2	0–3
30 May	Malta	3–0	Iceland	3–0	3–0	3–0
30 May	Luxembourg	3–0	Monaco	3–1	3–1	3–0
31 May	Malta	3–0	Monaco	3–0	3–0	3–0
31 May	Liechtenstein	1–2	Iceland	3–0	2–3	1–3
31 May	Luxembourg	1–2	Cyprus	2–3	1–3	3–2
31 May	Liechtenstein	3–0	Monaco	3–0	3–0	3–1
1 June	Iceland	1–2	Cyprus	0–3	3–0	1–3
1 June	Malta	3–0	Luxembourg	3–0	3–0	3–1
1 June	Monaco	0–3	Cyprus	0–3	0–3	0–3
1 June	Liechtenstein	2–1	Luxembourg	3–1	3–0	0–3
2 June	Malta	3–0	Cyprus	3–0	3–2	3–0
2 June	Luxembourg	3–0	Iceland	3–1	3–1	3–0
2 June	Monaco	0–3	Iceland	0–3	0–3	0–3
2 June	Liechtenstein	0–3	Malta	0–3	0–3	0–3
