= 2015 Open Engie de Touraine =

- Date: 19–25 October
- Edition: 11th
- Category: ITF Women's Circuit
- Prize money: $50,000
- Surface: Hard / Indoor
- Location: Joué-lès-Tours, France

Champions

Singles
- (Ukraine) Olga Fridman

Doubles
- (Romania) Alexandra Cadanțu / (Romania) Cristina Dinu
← 2014 ·	Open Engie de Touraine	· 2016 →

The 2015 Open Engie de Touraine was a professional tennis tournament played on indoor hard courts. It was the eleventh edition of the tournament and part of the 2015 ITF Women's Circuit, offering a total of $50,000 in prize money. It took place in Joué-lès-Tours, France, on 19–25 October 2015.

== Singles main draw entrants ==
=== Seeds ===
Country	Player	Rank^{1}	Seed
CZE	Kristýna Plíšková	117	1
ESP	María Teresa Torró Flor	128	2
FRA	Pauline Parmentier	132	3
FRA	Amandine Hesse	158	4
FRA	Virginie Razzano	175	5
FRA	Stéphanie Foretz	185	6
SUI	Viktorija Golubic	208	7
CRO	Ana Vrljić	230	8

- ^{1} Rankings as of 12 October 2015

=== Other entrants ===
The following players received wildcards into the singles main draw:

- (France) Lou Brouleau
- (France) Chloé Cirotte
- (France) Margot Decker
- (France) Emmanuelle Salas

The following players received entry from the qualifying draw:

- (Turkey) Başak Eraydın
- (Ukraine) Olga Fridman
- (Slovakia) Michaela Hončová
- (Switzerland) Patty Schnyder

== Champions ==
=== Singles ===
- (Ukraine) Olga Fridman def. (Czech Republic) Kristýna Plíšková, 6–2, 3–6, 6–1

=== Doubles ===
- (Romania) Alexandra Cadanțu / (Romania) Cristina Dinu def. (Switzerland) Viktorija Golubic / (Italy) Alice Matteucci, 7–5, 6–3
