= 2013 Open GDF Suez de Touraine =

- Date: 7–13 October
- Edition: 9th
- Category: ITF Women's Circuit
- Prize money: $50,000
- Surface: Hard (indoor)
- Location: Joué-lès-Tours, France

Champions

Singles
- (Croatia) Mirjana Lučić-Baroni

Doubles
- (France) Julie Coin / (Croatia) Ana Vrljić
← 2012 ·	Open GDF Suez de Touraine	· 2014 →

The 2013 Open GDF Suez de Touraine was a professional tennis tournament played on indoor hard courts. It was the ninth edition of the tournament which was part of the 2013 ITF Women's Circuit, offering a total of $50,000 in prize money. It took place in Joué-lès-Tours, France, on 7–13 October 2013.

== WTA entrants ==
=== Seeds ===
Country	Player	Rank^{1}	Seed
KAZ	Yulia Putintseva	96	1
ESP	Estrella Cabeza Candela	110	2
CRO	Mirjana Lučić-Baroni	111	3
UKR	Nadiya Kichenok	114	4
POR	Maria João Koehler	120	5
BEL	Alison Van Uytvanck	138	6
CZE	Andrea Hlaváčková	141	7
BEL	An-Sophie Mestach	142	8

- ^{1} Rankings as of 30 September 2013

=== Other entrants ===
The following players received wildcards into the singles main draw:

- (France) Fiona Ferro
- (France) Amandine Hesse
- (France) Irina Ramialison
- (France) Laura Thorpe

The following players received entry from the qualifying draw:

- (Poland) Marta Domachowska
- (Netherlands) Lesley Kerkhove
- (Croatia) Ana Konjuh
- (Netherlands) Michaëlla Krajicek

The following player received entry by a Junior Exempt:

- (Germany) Antonia Lottner

== Champions ==
=== Singles ===
- (Croatia) Mirjana Lučić-Baroni def. (Belgium) An-Sophie Mestach 6–4, 6–2

=== Doubles ===
- (France) Julie Coin / (Croatia) Ana Vrljić def. (Czech Republic) Andrea Hlaváčková / (Netherlands) Michaëlla Krajicek 6–3, 4–6, [15–13]
