= 2012 Open GDF Suez de Touraine =

- Date: 8–14 October
- Edition: 8th
- Location: Joué-lès-Tours, France

Champions

Singles
- (Puerto Rico) Monica Puig

Doubles
- (France) Séverine Beltrame / (France) Julie Coin
- Open GDF Suez de Touraine

The 2012 Open GDF Suez de Touraine was a professional tennis tournament played on indoor hard courts. It was the eighth edition of the tournament which was part of the 2012 ITF Women's Circuit. It took place in Joué-lès-Tours, France on 8–14 October 2012.

== WTA entrants ==
=== Seeds ===
| Country | Player | Rank^{1} | Seed |
|---|---|---|---|
| RUS | Alexandra Panova | 85 | 1 |
| FRA | Kristina Mladenovic | 96 | 2 |
| FRA | Stéphanie Foretz Gacon | 98 | 3 |
| AUT | Yvonne Meusburger | 115 | 4 |
| POR | Maria João Koehler | 130 | 5 |
| FRA | Claire Feuerstein | 133 | 6 |
| USA | Alison Riske | 141 | 7 |
| FRA | Irena Pavlovic | 142 | 8 |

- ^{1} Rankings are as of 1 October 2012.

=== Other entrants ===
The following players received wildcards into the singles main draw:

- (France) Julie Coin
- (France) Clothilde de Bernardi
- (France) Amandine Hesse
- (France) Constance Sibille

The following players received entry from the qualifying draw:

- (Latvia) Diāna Marcinkēviča
- (Italy) Anna Remondina
- (Croatia) Ana Vrljić
- (Ukraine) Maryna Zanevska

The following players received entry by a Junior Exempt:

- (Belgium) An-Sophie Mestach

== Champions ==
=== Singles ===
- (Puerto Rico) Monica Puig def. (Portugal) Maria João Koehler, 3–6, 6–4, 6–1

=== Doubles ===
- (France) Séverine Beltrame / (France) Julie Coin def. (Poland) Justyna Jegiołka / (Latvia) Diāna Marcinkēviča, 7–5, 6–4
