= 2016 Naturtex Women's Open =

- Date: 13–19 June
- Edition: 1st
- Category: ITF Women's Circuit
- Prize money: $50,000
- Surface: Clay
- Location: Szeged, Hungary

Champions

Singles
- (Bulgaria) Viktoriya Tomova

Doubles
- (Romania) Cristina Dinu / (North Macedonia) Lina Gjorcheska
| Naturtex Women's Open | · 2017 → |

The 2016 Naturtex Women's Open was a professional tennis tournament played on outdoor clay courts. It was the first edition of the tournament and part of the 2016 ITF Women's Circuit, offering a total of $50,000 in prize money. It took place in Szeged, Hungary, on 13–19 June 2016.

== Singles main draw entrants ==
=== Seeds ===
| Country | Player | Rank^{1} | Seed |
|---|---|---|---|
| BLR | Aliaksandra Sasnovich | 99 | 1 |
| GRE | Maria Sakkari | 116 | 2 |
| ~~SVK~~ | ~~Jana Čepelová~~ | ~~130~~ | ~~3~~ |
| BEL | Ysaline Bonaventure | 150 | 4 |
| CZE | Barbora Krejčíková | 190 | 5 |
| CZE | Jesika Malečková | 201 | 6 |
| RUS | Ekaterina Alexandrova | 213 | 7 |
| ROU | Cristina Dinu | 223 | 8 |

- ^{1} Rankings as of 6 June 2016.

=== Other entrants ===
The following player received a wildcard into the singles main draw:

- (Hungary) Bianka Békefi
- (Hungary) Ágnes Bukta
- (Hungary) Rebeka Stolmár
- (Hungary) Naomi Totka

The following players received entry from the qualifying draw:

- (Bosnia and Herzegovina) Ema Burgić Bucko
- (Romania) Cristina Ene
- (Serbia) Marina Kachar
- (Serbia) Dejana Radanović

The following player received entry by a lucky loser spot:

- (Romania) Gabriela Duca

== Champions ==
=== Singles ===
- (Bulgaria) Viktoriya Tomova def. (Greece) Maria Sakkari, 4–6, 6–0, 6–4

=== Doubles ===
- (Romania) Cristina Dinu / (North Macedonia) Lina Gjorcheska def. (Poland) Justyna Jegiołka / (Argentina) Guadalupe Pérez Rojas, 4–6, 6–1, [10–4]
