= 2015 Open Engie de Touraine – Singles =

Singles
- 2015 Open Engie de Touraine

Final
- Champion: (Ukraine) Olga Fridman
- Runner-up: (Czech Republic) Kristýna Plíšková
- Score: 6–2, 3–6, 6–1

Events
Singles	Doubles
← 2014 ·	Open Engie de Touraine	· 2016 →

Carina Witthöft is the defending champion, but decided not to participate this year.

Olga Fridman won the title, defeating Kristýna Plíšková in the final, 6–2, 3–6, 6–1.

== Seeds ==
1. (Czech Republic) Kristýna Plíšková (final)
2. (Spain) María Teresa Torró Flor (first round)
3. (France) Pauline Parmentier (semifinals)
4. (France) Amandine Hesse (first round)
5. (France) Virginie Razzano (second round; withdrew)
6. (France) Stéphanie Foretz (semifinals)
7. (Switzerland) Viktorija Golubic (first round)
8. (Croatia) Ana Vrljić (first round)

== Draw ==
=== Key ===
- Q = Qualifier
- WC = Wild card
- LL = Lucky loser
- Alt = Alternate
- SE = Special exempt
- PR = Protected ranking
- ITF = ITF entry
- JE = Junior exempt
- w/o = Walkover
- r = Retired
- d = Defaulted
- SR = Special ranking

=== Finals ===
Semifinals
1	(Czech Republic) Kristýna Plíšková	7^{8}	7^{12}
3	(France) Pauline Parmentier	6^{6}	6^{10}
6	(France) Stéphanie Foretz	2	2
Q	(Ukraine) Olga Fridman	6	6

Final
1	(Czech Republic) Kristýna Plíšková	2	6	1
Q	(Ukraine) Olga Fridman	6	3	6

=== Top half ===
First round
1	(Czech Republic) Kr Plíšková	6	7
(Ukraine) E Ianchuk	1	5
WC	(France) E Salas	3	6	6
WC	(France) C Cirotte	6	4	1
(Georgia (country)) S Shapatava	6	7^{7}
WC	(France) M Decker	4	6^{3}
(Italy) G Gatto-Monticone	5	7^{8}	6
8	(Croatia) A Vrljić	7	6^{6}	3
3	(France) P Parmentier	7	6
(Slovakia) R Šramková	5	2
(Italy) A Brianti	6^{4}	6	6
(France) F Ferro	7^{7}	4	0
(France) I Ramialison	2	6	6
Q	(Switzerland) P Schnyder	6	2	3
(Germany) T Korpatsch	2	4
5	(France) V Razzano	6	6

Second round
1	(Czech Republic) Kr Plíšková	6	6
WC	(France) E Salas	3	2
(Georgia (country)) S Shapatava	6	6
(Italy) G Gatto-Monticone	3	2
3	(France) P Parmentier	7	6
(Italy) A Brianti	5	3
(France) I Ramialison	w/o
5	(France) V Razzano

Quarterfinals
1	(Czech Republic) Kr Plíšková	6	6
(Georgia (country)) S Shapatava	3	1
3	(France) P Parmentier	6	6
(France) I Ramialison	3	2

Semifinals
1	(Czech Republic) Kr Plíšková	7^{8}	7^{12}
3	(France) P Parmentier	6^{6}	6^{10}

=== Bottom half ===
First round
6	(France) S Foretz	6	6
Q	(Slovakia) M Hončová	2	3
(Romania) C Dinu	6	6
(France) C Paquet	3	3
Q	(Turkey) B Eraydın	6	3	7^{7}
(France) M Georges	3	6	6^{5}
(Spain) G García Pérez	6^{7}	7	7^{7}
4	(France) A Hesse	7^{9}	5	6^{3}
7	(Switzerland) V Golubic	2	6^{5}
Q	(Ukraine) O Fridman	6	7^{7}
(Italy) M Caregaro	6	3	4
WC	(France) L Brouleau	4	6	6
(Ukraine) A Vasylyeva	2	3
(United States) B Pera	6	6
(Romania) A Cadanțu	6	6
2	(Spain) MT Torró Flor	3	1

Second round
6	(France) S Foretz	6	6
(Romania) C Dinu	3	1
Q	(Turkey) B Eraydın	6	6
(Spain) G García Pérez	1	2
Q	(Ukraine) O Fridman	6	0
WC	(France) L Brouleau	3	0^{r}
(United States) B Pera	5	6	6
(Romania) A Cadanțu	7	3	0

Quarterfinals
6	(France) S Foretz	6	2	7^{7}
Q	(Turkey) B Eraydın	1	6	6^{5}
Q	(Ukraine) O Fridman	6	6
(United States) B Pera	4	0

Semifinals
6	(France) S Foretz	2	2
Q	(Ukraine) O Fridman	6	6
