= 2013 Open GDF Suez de Touraine – Doubles =

Doubles
- 2013 Open GDF Suez de Touraine

Final
- Champions: (France) Julie Coin (Croatia) Ana Vrljić
- Runners-up: (Czech Republic) Andrea Hlaváčková (Netherlands) Michaëlla Krajicek
- Score: 6–3, 4–6, [15–13]

Events
Singles	Doubles
← 2012 ·	Open GDF Suez de Touraine	· 2014 →

Séverine Beltrame and Julie Coin were the defending champions, having won the event in 2012, but Beltrame had announced her retirement from professional tennis in June 2013. Coin partnered up with Ana Vrljić as the third seeds.

Coin and Vrljić won the tournament, defeating first seeds Andrea Hlaváčková and Michaëlla Krajicek in the final, 6–3, 4–6, [15–13].

== Seeds ==
1. (Czech Republic) Andrea Hlaváčková / (Netherlands) Michaëlla Krajicek (final)
2. (Ukraine) Lyudmyla Kichenok / (Ukraine) Nadiya Kichenok (semifinals)
3. (France) Julie Coin / (Croatia) Ana Vrljić (champions)
4. (Poland) Marta Domachowska / (Poland) Magda Linette (quarterfinals)

== Draw ==
=== Key ===
- Q = Qualifier
- WC = Wild card
- LL = Lucky loser
- Alt = Alternate
- SE = Special exempt
- PR = Protected ranking
- ITF = ITF entry
- JE = Junior exempt
- w/o = Walkover
- r = Retired
- d = Defaulted
- SR = Special ranking

First round
1	(Czech Republic) A Hlaváčková (Netherlands) M Krajicek	7^{7}	3	[10]
(France) M Arcangioli (France) A Hesse	6^{0}	6	[2]
(Denmark) K Barbat (Netherlands) C Mulder	1	5
(France) M Girard (France) I Ramialison	6	7
4	(Poland) M Domachowska (Poland) M Linette	6	1	[10]
(Italy) C Rosatello (Russia) V Savinykh	2	6	[7]
(Turkey) Ç Büyükakçay (Switzerland) V Golubic	7	6
(Czech Republic) P Krejsová (Latvia) D Marcinkēviča	5	3
(Ukraine) A Kalinina (Russia) N Orlova	4	6	[8]
(Brazil) PC Gonçalves (Chile) D Seguel	6	2	[10]
(Liechtenstein) K von Deichmann (Germany) N Zander	4	6	[3]
3	(France) J Coin (Croatia) A Vrljić	6	2	[10]
(Canada) S Dubois (United States) N Melichar	6	7^{7}
(Spain) E Cabeza Candela (Portugal) MJ Koehler	3	6^{3}
(France) E Guisard (France) M Partaud	3	2
2	(Ukraine) L Kichenok (Ukraine) N Kichenok	6	6

Quarterfinals
1	(Czech Republic) A Hlaváčková (Netherlands) M Krajicek	6	6
(France) M Girard (France) I Ramialison	1	4
4	(Poland) M Domachowska (Poland) M Linette	6	4	[5]
(Turkey) Ç Büyükakçay (Switzerland) V Golubic	0	6	[10]
(Brazil) PC Gonçalves (Chile) D Seguel	3	6	[11]
3	(France) J Coin (Croatia) A Vrljić	6	4	[13]
(Canada) S Dubois (United States) N Melichar	5	6^{1}
2	(Ukraine) L Kichenok (Ukraine) N Kichenok	7	7^{7}

Semifinals
1	(Czech Republic) A Hlaváčková (Netherlands) M Krajicek	6	6
(Turkey) Ç Büyükakçay (Switzerland) V Golubic	3	3
3	(France) J Coin (Croatia) A Vrljić	2	6	[10]
2	(Ukraine) L Kichenok (Ukraine) N Kichenok	6	2	[7]

Final
1	(Czech Republic) A Hlaváčková (Netherlands) M Krajicek	3	6	[13]
3	(France) J Coin (Croatia) A Vrljić	6	4	[15]
