= 2013 Open GDF Suez de Touraine – Singles =

Singles
- 2013 Open GDF Suez de Touraine

Final
- Champion: (Croatia) Mirjana Lučić-Baroni
- Runner-up: (Belgium) An-Sophie Mestach
- Score: 6–4, 6–2

Events
Singles	Doubles
← 2012 ·	Open GDF Suez de Touraine	· 2014 →

Monica Puig was the defending champion, having won the event in 2012, but she decided to participate at the 2013 HP Open.

Mirjana Lučić-Baroni won the tournament, defeating An-Sophie Mestach in the final, 6–4, 6–2.

== Seeds ==
1. (Kazakhstan) Yulia Putintseva (first round)
2. (Spain) Estrella Cabeza Candela (first round)
3. (Croatia) Mirjana Lučić-Baroni (champion)
4. (Ukraine) Nadiya Kichenok (second round)
5. (Portugal) Maria João Koehler (first round)
6. (Belgium) Alison Van Uytvanck (first round)
7. (Czech Republic) Andrea Hlaváčková (first round)
8. (Belgium) An-Sophie Mestach (final)

== Main draw ==
=== Key ===
- Q = Qualifier
- WC = Wild card
- LL = Lucky loser
- Alt = Alternate
- SE = Special exempt
- PR = Protected ranking
- ITF = ITF entry
- JE = Junior exempt
- w/o = Walkover
- r = Retired
- d = Defaulted
- SR = Special ranking

=== Finals ===
Semifinals
(United Kingdom) Tara Moore	7^{7}	4	1^{r}
8	(Belgium) An-Sophie Mestach	6^{3}	6	4
3	(Croatia) Mirjana Lučić-Baroni	6	6
(Poland) Magda Linette	1	4

Final
8	(Belgium) An-Sophie Mestach	4	2
3	(Croatia) Mirjana Lučić-Baroni	6	6

=== Top half ===
First round
1	(Kazakhstan) Y Putintseva	4	6	5
Q	(Netherlands) M Krajicek	6	3	7
WC	(France) F Ferro	5	4
(France) P Parmentier	7	6
(United Kingdom) T Moore	6	6
WC	(France) I Ramialison	3	2
Q	(Croatia) A Konjuh	3	6	6
6	(Belgium) A Van Uytvanck	6	4	2
4	(Ukraine) N Kichenok	6	6
(Ukraine) Y Beygelzimer	3	2
(Germany) A-L Friedsam	4	6	6
JE	(Germany) A Lottner	6	0	2
(Ukraine) L Kichenok	7^{7}	3	6
(France) S Foretz Gacon	6^{2}	6	1
(Slovakia) K Kučová	0	1
8	(Belgium) A-S Mestach	6	6

Second round
Q	(Netherlands) M Krajicek	6	4	6
(France) P Parmentier	4	6	3
(United Kingdom) T Moore	6	7^{7}
Q	(Croatia) A Konjuh	2	6^{3}
4	(Ukraine) N Kichenok	2	4
(Germany) A-L Friedsam	6	6
(Ukraine) L Kichenok	6^{4}	6	6^{3}
8	(Belgium) A-S Mestach	7^{7}	3	7^{7}

Quarterfinals
Q	(Netherlands) M Krajicek	6	3	3
(United Kingdom) T Moore	2	6	6
(Germany) A-L Friedsam	5	3
8	(Belgium) A-S Mestach	7	6

Semifinals
(United Kingdom) T Moore	7^{7}	4	1^{r}
8	(Belgium) A-S Mestach	6^{3}	6	4

=== Bottom half ===
First round
7	(Czech Republic) A Hlaváčková	3	6^{5}
(France) J Coin	6	7^{7}
WC	(France) L Thorpe	2	2
WC	(France) A Hesse	6	6
Q	(Netherlands) L Kerkhove	6	6
(Canada) S Dubois	4	2
(Latvia) D Marcinkēviča	1	3
3	(Croatia) M Lučić-Baroni	6	6
5	(Portugal) MJ Koehler	3	3
(Croatia) A Vrljić	6	6
(Russia) V Savinykh	6	5	0
(Poland) M Linette	4	7	6
(Turkey) Ç Büyükakçay	3	7^{7}	1
(Switzerland) V Golubic	6	6^{5}	6
Q	(Poland) M Domachowska	7^{7}	7^{7}
2	(Spain) E Cabeza Candela	6^{3}	6^{4}

Second round
(France) J Coin	6^{3}	4
WC	(France) A Hesse	7^{7}	6
(Netherlands) L Kerkhove	5	4
3	(Croatia) M Lučić-Baroni	7	6
(Croatia) A Vrljić	2	4
(Poland) M Linette	6	6
(Switzerland) V Golubic	6	2	1
Q	(Poland) M Domachowska	2	6	6

Quarterfinals
WC	(France) A Hesse	6	5	2
3	(Croatia) M Lučić-Baroni	3	7	6
(Poland) M Linette	6	6
Q	(Poland) M Domachowska	4	4

Semifinals
3	(Croatia) M Lučić-Baroni	6	6
(Poland) M Linette	1	4
