= 2014 Open GDF Suez de Touraine =

Sumedh Rajendra Dede

- Date: 13–19 October
- Edition: 10th
- Category: ITF Women's Circuit
- Prize money: $50,000
- Surface: Hard (indoor)
- Location: Joué-lès-Tours, France

Champions

Singles
- (Germany) Carina Witthöft

Doubles
- (France) Stéphanie Foretz / (France) Amandine Hesse
| ← 2013 · | Open GDF Suez de Touraine | · 2015 → |

The 2014 Open GDF Suez de Touraine was a professional tennis tournament played on indoor hard courts. It was the tenth edition of the tournament which was part of the 2014 ITF Women's Circuit, offering a total of $50,000 in prize money. It took place in Joué-lès-Tours, France, on 13–19 October 2014.

== Singles main-draw entrants ==
=== Seeds ===
| Country | Player | Rank^{1} | Seed |
|---|---|---|---|
| CZE | Kristýna Plíšková | 90 | 1 |
| HUN | Tímea Babos | 108 | 2 |
| AUT | Tamira Paszek | 115 | 3 |
| GER | Carina Witthöft | 119 | 4 |
| ROU | Andreea Mitu | 136 | 5 |
| FRA | Claire Feuerstein | 148 | 6 |
| UKR | Yuliya Beygelzimer | 166 | 7 |
| UKR | Nadiia Kichenok | 181 | 8 |

- ^{1} Rankings as of 6 October 2014

=== Other entrants ===
The following players received wildcards into the singles main draw:

- (France) Joséphine Boualem
- (France) Lou Brouleau
- (Ukraine) Nadiia Kichenok
- (France) Jessika Ponchet

The following players received entry from the qualifying draw:

- (France) Manon Arcangioli
- (Croatia) Jana Fett
- (Austria) Pia König
- (Croatia) Adrijana Lekaj

== Champions ==
=== Singles ===
- (Germany) Carina Witthöft def. (Poland) Urszula Radwańska 6–3, 7–6^{(8–6)}

=== Doubles ===
- (France) Stéphanie Foretz / (France) Amandine Hesse def. (Italy) Alberta Brianti / (Italy) Maria Elena Camerin by default
