= 2015 Open Engie de Touraine – Doubles =

Doubles
- 2015 Open Engie de Touraine

Final
- Champions: (Romania) Alexandra Cadanțu (Romania) Cristina Dinu
- Runners-up: (Switzerland) Viktorija Golubic (Italy) Alice Matteucci
- Score: 7–5, 6–3

Events
| Singles | Doubles |
| ← 2014 · | Open Engie de Touraine | · 2016 → |

Stéphanie Foretz and Amandine Hesse are the defending champions, but retired in the second round to Alexandra Cadanțu and Cristina Dinu.

Cadanțu and Dinu won the title, defeating Viktorija Golubic and Alice Matteucci in the final, 7–5, 6–3.

== Seeds ==
1. (France) Stéphanie Foretz / (France) Amandine Hesse (quarterfinals)
2. (Georgia (country)) Sofia Shapatava / (Ukraine) Anastasiya Vasylyeva (semifinals)
3. (Switzerland) Viktorija Golubic / (Italy) Alice Matteucci (final)
4. (Turkey) Başak Eraydın / (Russia) Polina Monova (semifinals)

== Draw ==
=== Key ===
- Q = Qualifier
- WC = Wild card
- LL = Lucky loser
- Alt = Alternate
- SE = Special exempt
- PR = Protected ranking
- ITF = ITF entry
- JE = Junior exempt
- w/o = Walkover
- r = Retired
- d = Defaulted
- SR = Special ranking

=== Draw ===
First round
1 | (France) S Foretz (France) A Hesse | 6 | 4 | [10]
(France) C Paquet (France) P Parmentier | 4 | 6 | [8]
(Romania) A Cadanțu (Romania) C Dinu | 6 | 6
WC | (Finland) MN Eklund (United States) S Luk | 2 | 0
4 | (Turkey) B Eraydın (Russia) P Monova | 6 | 6
WC | (Switzerland) P Schnyder (Turkey) D Yurtkuran | 2 | 4
(Ukraine) E Ianchuk (United States) B Pera | 6 | 3 | [11]
(Romania) IM Bara (France) I Ramialison | 0 | 6 | [9]
(Romania) IL Roșca (Bulgaria) J Terziyska | 6 | 6
(France) A Albié (France) A Bacquié | 4 | 3
WC | (France) C Cirotte (France) L Prenant | 0 | 1
3 | (Switzerland) V Golubic (Italy) A Matteucci | 6 | 6
(Argentina) T Búa (Spain) G García Pérez | 6 | 7^{7}
(France) F Caramaro (Belgium) C Chantraine | 0 | 6^{2}
(Slovakia) M Hončová (Slovakia) R Šramková | 2 | 2
2 | (Georgia (country)) S Shapatava (Ukraine) A Vasylyeva | 6 | 6

Quarterfinals
1 | (France) S Foretz (France) A Hesse | 1^{r}
(Romania) A Cadanțu (Romania) C Dinu | 3
4 | (Turkey) B Eraydın (Russia) P Monova | 6 | 6
(Ukraine) E Ianchuk (United States) B Pera | 3 | 2
(Romania) IL Roșca (Bulgaria) J Terziyska | 2 | 3
3 | (Switzerland) V Golubic (Italy) A Matteucci | 6 | 6
(Argentina) T Búa (Spain) G García Pérez | 5 | 3
2 | (Georgia (country)) S Shapatava (Ukraine) A Vasylyeva | 7 | 6

Semifinals
(Romania) A Cadanțu (Romania) C Dinu | 6 | 4 | [10]
4 | (Turkey) B Eraydın (Russia) P Monova | 4 | 6 | [6]
3 | (Switzerland) V Golubic (Italy) A Matteucci | 7 | 5 | [10]
2 | (Georgia (country)) S Shapatava (Ukraine) A Vasylyeva | 5 | 7 | [4]

Final
(Romania) A Cadanțu (Romania) C Dinu | 7 | 6
3 | (Switzerland) V Golubic (Italy) A Matteucci | 5 | 3
