= Hôtel de Ville, Joué-lès-Tours =

Town hall in Joué-lès-Tours, France

Hôtel de Ville
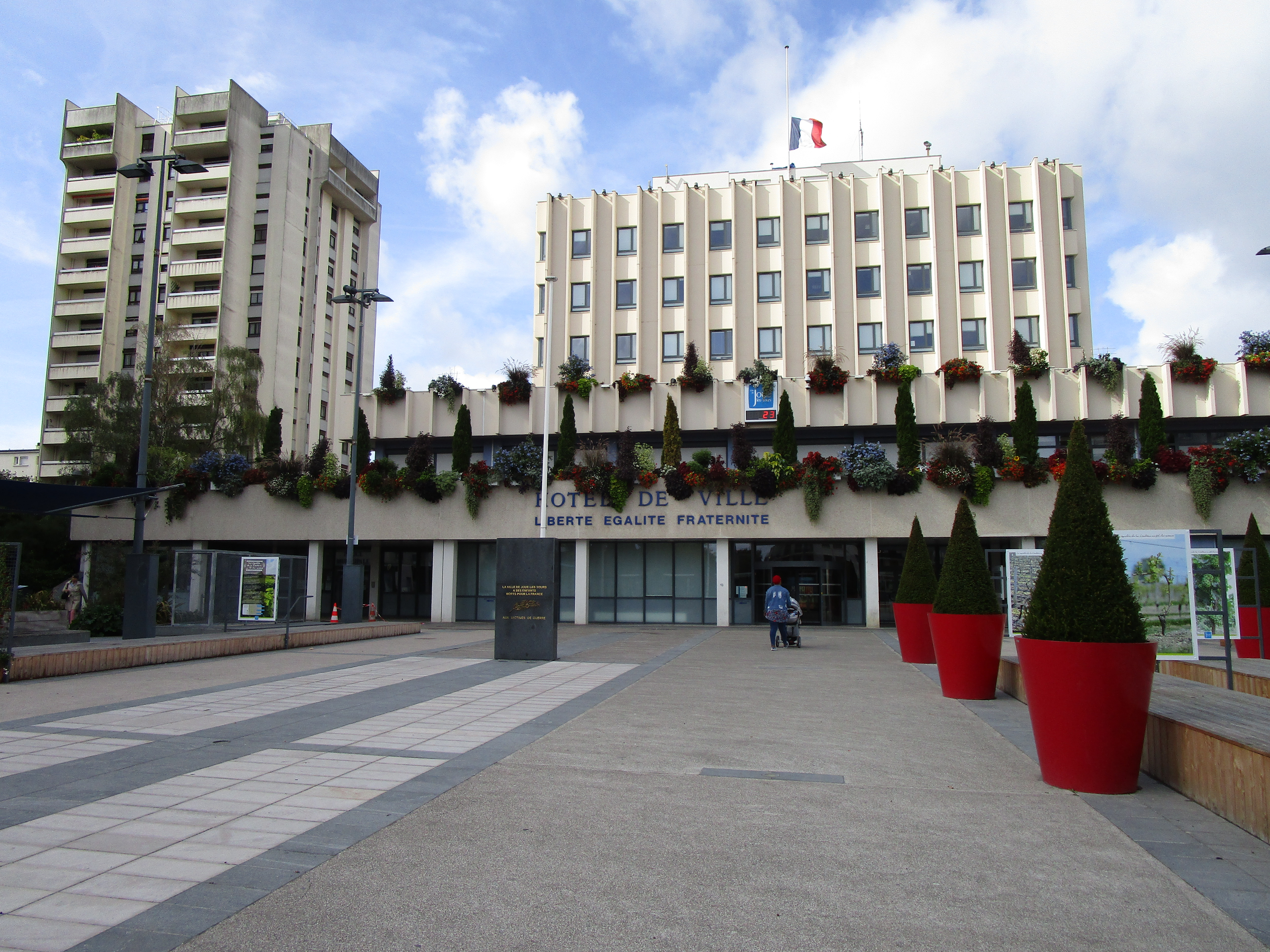
- The main frontage of the Hôtel de Ville in September 2019
- Interactive map of the Hôtel de Ville area

General information
- Type: City hall
- Architectural style: Brutalist style
- Location: Joué-lès-Tours, France
- Coordinates: 47.3511°N 0.6615°E
- Completed: 1976

Design and construction
- Architect: André Remondet

The Hôtel de Ville (French pronunciation: [otɛl də vil], City Hall) is a municipal building in Joué-lès-Tours, Indre-et-Loire, in central France, standing on Place François Mitterrand.

== History ==
Following the French Revolution, the town council initially met at the home of the mayor at the time. This arrangement continued until 1843, when the council decided to commission a dedicated town hall. The site they selected was on a square now known as Place du Général Leclerc. The new building was designed in the neoclassical style, built in brick with a stucco finish and was completed in 1848.

The design involved a single-storey main frontage with five recessed openings facing onto the street. The central opening contained a doorway, while the other openings contained round headed windows. The building was increased in height when an extra floor was added in 1909. The extra floor was fenestrated by five square-headed casement windows and surmounted by a cornice with five curved pediments above. Internally, the principal rooms included a cell for incarcerating petty criminals. After being vacated by the council in 1976, the building was converted for use as the local police station and was notable as the venue for the stabbing of three policemen on 20 December 2014.

In the early 1970s, after significant population growth, the town council led by the mayor, Raymond Lory, decided to commission a modern town hall. The site they selected, on the west side of Rue Gamard, formed part of a larger project to develop the town centre. The new building was designed by André Remondet in the brutalist style, built in concrete and glass, and was officially opened by the president of the Senate of France, Alain Poher, on 11 December 1976.

The design involved a four-floor tower sitting on a two-storey podium. The podium featured a plate glass frontage on the ground floor, and a narrow band of windows on the first floor. The main frontage of the tower was faced with alternating bands of concrete and dark-framed windows; full-height concrete slats were installed on either side of the windows. Internally, the principal rooms, both of which were lined with fine wood, were the Salle des Mariages (wedding hall) and the Salle du Conseil (council chamber), which featured a large oval table.

In February 2010, following an inspirational speech by the president of France, Nicolas Sarkozy, on laïcité positive (positive secularism), the mayor, Philippe Le Breton, ordered that the new inscription "laïcité" (secularism) be added to the existing inscription "liberté, égalité, fraternité" (liberty, equality, fraternity) on the face of the town hall. There was considerable opposition to this development and, after Frédéric Augis was elected mayor in April 2014, the new inscription was removed.

An extensive programme of works, involving replacement of the lifts at a cost of €220,000 and replacement of the window frames at a cost of €470,000, was initiated in December 2011.
