= 2014 Open GDF Suez de Touraine – Doubles =

Doubles
- 2014 Open GDF Suez de Touraine

Final
- Champions: (France) Stéphanie Foretz (France) Amandine Hesse
- Runners-up: (Italy) Alberta Brianti (Italy) Maria Elena Camerin
- Score: Default

Events
Singles	Doubles
← 2013 ·	Open GDF Suez de Touraine	· 2015 →

Julie Coin and Ana Vrljić were the defending champions, having won the event in 2013, however Vrljić chose to participate at Tampico instead, whilst Coin chose not to participate.

Stéphanie Foretz and Amandine Hesse won the title, defeating Alberta Brianti and Maria Elena Camerin in the final by default.

== Seeds ==
1. (Ukraine) Yuliya Beygelzimer / (Romania) Andreea Mitu (quarterfinals)
2. (France) Stéphanie Foretz / (France) Amandine Hesse (champions)
3. (Italy) Giulia Gatto-Monticone / (Switzerland) Xenia Knoll (semifinals)
4. (Ukraine) Nadiia Kichenok / (United Kingdom) Tara Moore (quarterfinals)

== Draw ==
=== Key ===
- Q = Qualifier
- WC = Wild card
- LL = Lucky loser
- Alt = Alternate
- ITF = ITF entry
- PR = Protected ranking
- SR = Special ranking
- SE = Special exempt
- JE = Junior exempt
- JR = Junior Accelerator Programme entrant
- CO = College Accelerator Programme entrant
- NG = Next Gen Accelerator Program entrant
- w/o = Walkover
- r = Retired
- d = Defaulted

First round
(Italy) A Brianti (Italy) ME Camerin	4	6	[10]
(Finland) E Laine (Belarus) L Marozava	6	2	[6]
3	(Italy) G Gatto-Monticone (Switzerland) X Knoll	2	7	[10]
WC	(Croatia) J Fett (Croatia) A Lekaj	6	5	[6]
(Belgium) M Boev (Ukraine) G Poznikhirenko	2	3
(Austria) T Paszek (France) C Sibille	6	6
(Denmark) K Barbat (France) L Prenant	0	2
(Serbia) B Bonić (France) M Yerolymos	6	6
(Latvia) J Ostapenko (Slovakia) R Šramková	1	7	[7]
4	(Ukraine) N Kichenok (United Kingdom) T Moore	6	5	[10]
(France) M Arcangioli (France) C Paquet	7^{7}	6
(France) F Caramaro (France) M Georges	6^{4}	4

Quarterfinals
1	(Ukraine) Y Beygelzimer (Romania) A Mitu	6	4	[6]
(Italy) A Brianti (Italy) ME Camerin	2	6	[10]
3	(Italy) G Gatto-Monticone (Switzerland) X Knoll	w/o
(Austria) T Paszek (France) C Sibille
(Serbia) B Bonić (France) M Yerolymos	7	4	[12]
4	(Ukraine) N Kichenok (United Kingdom) T Moore	5	6	[10]
(France) M Arcangioli (France) C Paquet	2	1
2	(France) S Foretz (France) A Hesse	6	6

Semifinals
(Italy) A Brianti (Italy) ME Camerin	6	4	[10]
3	(Italy) G Gatto-Monticone (Switzerland) X Knoll	3	6	[7]
(Serbia) B Bonić (France) M Yerolymos	4	3
2	(France) S Foretz (France) A Hesse	6	6

Final
(Italy) A Brianti (Italy) ME Camerin	d
2	(France) S Foretz (France) A Hesse
