= 2016 Open Engie de Touraine – Singles =

Singles
- 2016 Open Engie de Touraine

Final
- Champion: (Belgium) Maryna Zanevska
- Runner-up: (Romania) Elena Gabriela Ruse
- Score: 6–3, 6–3

Events
Singles	Doubles
← 2015 ·	Open Engie de Touraine	· 2017 →

Olga Fridman was the defending champion, but chose not to participate.

Maryna Zanevska won the title, defeating Elena Gabriela Ruse in the final, 6–3, 6–3.

== Seeds ==
1. (Serbia) Ivana Jorović (first round)
2. (Belgium) Maryna Zanevska (champion)
3. (Czech Republic) Barbora Štefková (first round)
4. (Netherlands) Lesley Kerkhove (semifinals)
5. (Tunisia) Ons Jabeur (quarterfinals)
6. (Romania) Andreea Mitu (second round)
7. (Chile) Daniela Seguel (quarterfinals)
8. (France) Amandine Hesse (first round)

== Main draw ==
=== Key ===
- Q = Qualifier
- WC = Wild card
- LL = Lucky loser
- Alt = Alternate
- SE = Special exempt
- PR = Protected ranking
- ITF = ITF entry
- JE = Junior exempt
- w/o = Walkover
- r = Retired
- d = Defaulted
- SR = Special ranking

=== Finals ===
Semifinals
(Romania) Elena Gabriela Ruse	6	6
Q	(Latvia) Diāna Marcinkēviča	2	3
4	(Netherlands) Lesley Kerkhove	1	0
2	(Belgium) Maryna Zanevska	6	6

Final
(Romania) Elena Gabriela Ruse	3	3
2	(Belgium) Maryna Zanevska	6	6

=== Top half ===
First round
1	(Serbia) I Jorović	5	4
(Romania) EG Ruse	7	6
(Netherlands) Q Lemoine	7	5	6
(France) C Feuerstein	5	7	4
(Belarus) V Lapko	6	6
Q	(France) T Gravouil	3	2
(France) F Ferro	6	1	2
6	(Romania) A Mitu	3	6	6
3	(Czech Republic) B Štefková	4	4
WC	(France) E Lechemia	6	6
(France) C Paquet	6	6^{3}	6
(Italy) J Pieri	1	7^{7}	3
Q	(Latvia) D Marcinkēviča	7^{9}	5	6
(Switzerland) R Masarova	6^{7}	7	2
WC	(France) M Yerolymos	5	6	6
8	(France) A Hesse	7	3	3

Second round
(Romania) EG Ruse	6	4	6
(Netherlands) Q Lemoine	3	6	4
(Belarus) V Lapko	6	6
6	(Romania) A Mitu	3	2
WC	(France) E Lechemia	6^{5}	6^{1}
(France) C Paquet	7^{7}	7^{7}
Q	(Latvia) D Marcinkēviča	7	6
WC	(France) M Yerolymos	5	4

Quarterfinals
(Romania) EG Ruse	6	3	6
(Belarus) V Lapko	4	6	2
(France) C Paquet	3	7	1
Q	(Latvia) D Marcinkēviča	6	5	6

Semifinals
(Romania) EG Ruse	6	6
Q	(Latvia) D Marcinkēviča	2	3

=== Bottom half ===
First round
7	(Chile) D Seguel	6	7^{8}
(Spain) O Sáez Larra	2	6^{6}
LL	(France) E Salas	6	6
(France) I Ramialison	3	1
WC	(France) L Brouleau	4	3
Q	(Russia) A Tarasova	6	6
(Romania) A Cadanțu	1	3
4	(Netherlands) L Kerkhove	6	6
5	(Tunisia) O Jabeur	6	6
(Brazil) B Haddad Maia	4	4
(Georgia (country)) E Gorgodze	2	3
WC	(France) M Arcangioli	6	6
(Belgium) M Benoît	0	7^{7}	6
Q	(Belarus) S Pirazhenka	6	6^{3}	2
(Switzerland) P Schnyder	6	1	3
2	(Belgium) M Zanevska	3	6	6

Second round
7	(Chile) D Seguel	6	6
LL	(France) E Salas	3	1
Q	(Russia) A Tarasova	2	3
4	(Netherlands) L Kerkhove	6	6
5	(Tunisia) O Jabeur	7^{7}	6
WC	(France) M Arcangioli	6^{3}	4
(Belgium) M Benoît	2	4
2	(Belgium) M Zanevska	6	6

Quarterfinals
7	(Chile) D Seguel	1	6^{4}
4	(Netherlands) L Kerkhove	6	7^{7}
5	(Tunisia) O Jabeur	4	6^{5}
2	(Belgium) M Zanevska	6	7^{7}

Semifinals
4	(Netherlands) L Kerkhove	1	0
2	(Belgium) M Zanevska	6	6
