= 2016 Naturtex Women's Open – Doubles =

Doubles
- 2016 Naturtex Women's Open

Final
- Champions: (Romania) Cristina Dinu (North Macedonia) Lina Gjorcheska
- Runners-up: (Poland) Justyna Jegiołka (Argentina) Guadalupe Pérez Rojas
- Score: 4–6, 6–1, [10–4]

Events
Singles	Doubles
Naturtex Women's Open	· 2017 →

This was a new event in the ITF Women's Circuit.

Cristina Dinu and Lina Gjorcheska won the inaugural event, defeating Justyna Jegiołka and Guadalupe Pérez Rojas in the final, 4–6, 6–1, [10–4].

== Seeds ==
1. (Turkey) Başak Eraydın / (Liechtenstein) Stephanie Vogt (first round)
2. (Romania) Cristina Dinu / (North Macedonia) Lina Gjorcheska (champions)
3. (Poland) Justyna Jegiołka / (Argentina) Guadalupe Pérez Rojas (final)
4. (Czech Republic) Barbora Krejčíková / (Czech Republic) Jesika Malečková (first round)

== Draw ==
=== Key ===
- Q = Qualifier
- WC = Wild card
- LL = Lucky loser
- Alt = Alternate
- SE = Special exempt
- PR = Protected ranking
- ITF = ITF entry
- JE = Junior exempt
- w/o = Walkover
- r = Retired
- d = Defaulted
- SR = Special ranking

First round
1	(Turkey) B Eraydın (Liechtenstein) S Vogt	3	7^{8}	[7]
(Romania) E Bogdan (Hungary) V Lukács	6	6^{6}	[10]
(Bosnia and Herzegovina) E Burgić Bucko (United States) S Santamaria	4	6	[10]
WC	(Hungary) B Békefi (Hungary) S Szlavikovics	6	1	[6]
3	(Poland) J Jegiołka (Argentina) G Pérez Rojas	6	6
WC	(Hungary) F Gécsek (Hungary) A Nagy	0	0
(Romania) E-T Cadar (Romania) G Duca	2	1
(Hungary) Á Bukta (Hungary) R Stolmár	6	6
(Hungary) A Bondár (Romania) E Ruse
WC	(Serbia) M Kachar (Serbia) M Spremo	w/o
(Romania) A Cadanțu (Netherlands) A Rus	6	2	[10]
4	(Czech Republic) B Krejčíková (Czech Republic) J Malečková	2	6	[7]
(Romania) N Dascălu (Bulgaria) V Tomova
(Hungary) D Gálfi (Hungary) R-L Jani	w/o
(Greece) E Daniilidou (Serbia) B Marinković	2	6	[4]
2	(Romania) C Dinu (North Macedonia) L Gjorcheska	6	3	[10]

Quarterfinals
(Romania) E Bogdan (Hungary) V Lukács	6	3	[10]
(Bosnia and Herzegovina) E Burgić Bucko (United States) S Santamaria	2	6	[3]
3	(Poland) J Jegiołka (Argentina) G Pérez Rojas	4	6	[10]
(Hungary) Á Bukta (Hungary) R Stolmár	6	0	[4]
WC	(Serbia) M Kachar (Serbia) M Spremo	w/o
(Romania) A Cadanțu (Netherlands) A Rus
(Hungary) D Gálfi (Hungary) R-L Jani	6^{1}	2
2	(Romania) C Dinu (North Macedonia) L Gjorcheska	7^{7}	6

Semifinals
(Romania) E Bogdan (Hungary) V Lukács	4	4
3	(Poland) J Jegiołka (Argentina) G Pérez Rojas	6	6
WC	(Serbia) M Kachar (Serbia) M Spremo	0	3
2	(Romania) C Dinu (North Macedonia) L Gjorcheska	6	6

Final
3	(Poland) J Jegiołka (Argentina) G Pérez Rojas	6	1	[4]
2	(Romania) C Dinu (North Macedonia) L Gjorcheska	4	6	[10]
