= 2016 Naturtex Women's Open – Singles =

Singles
- 2016 Naturtex Women's Open

Final
- Champion: (Bulgaria) Viktoriya Tomova
- Runner-up: (Greece) Maria Sakkari
- Score: 4–6, 6–0, 6–4

Events
Singles	Doubles
Naturtex Women's Open	· 2017 →

This was a new event to the ITF Women's Circuit.

Viktoriya Tomova won the inaugural title, defeating Maria Sakkari in the final, 4–6, 6–0, 6–4.

== Seeds ==
1. (Belarus) Aliaksandra Sasnovich (second round)
2. (Greece) Maria Sakkari (final)
3. (Slovakia) ~~Jana Čepelová~~ (withdrew)
4. (Belgium) Ysaline Bonaventure (semifinals)
5. (Czech Republic) Barbora Krejčíková (first round)
6. (Czech Republic) Jesika Malečková (quarterfinals)
7. (Russia) Ekaterina Alexandrova (quarterfinals)
8. (Romania) Cristina Dinu (first round)

== Main draw ==
=== Key ===
- Q = Qualifier
- WC = Wild card
- LL = Lucky loser
- Alt = Alternate
- SE = Special exempt
- PR = Protected ranking
- ITF = ITF entry
- JE = Junior exempt
- w/o = Walkover
- r = Retired
- d = Defaulted
- SR = Special ranking

=== Finals ===
Semifinals
(Bulgaria) Viktoriya Tomova	6	6
4	(Belgium) Ysaline Bonaventure	2	4
(Hungary) Réka-Luca Jani	4	7	1
2	(Greece) Maria Sakkari	6	5	6

Final
(Bulgaria) Viktoriya Tomova	4	6	6
2	(Greece) Maria Sakkari	6	0	4

=== Top half ===
First round
1	(Belarus) A Sasnovich	6	7
WC	(Hungary) R Stolmár	2	5
(Romania) N Dascălu	5	3
(Slovenia) T Zidanšek	7	6
(United States) S Santamaria	2	4
(Netherlands) A Rus	6	6
(Bulgaria) V Tomova	6	6
5	(Czech Republic) B Krejčíková	4	1
4	(Belgium) Y Bonaventure	7^{7}	6
(Serbia) M Spremo	6^{3}	0
(North Macedonia) L Gjorcheska	6	7^{8}
(Liechtenstein) S Vogt	3	6^{6}
(Romania) E Ruse	4^{r}
(Hungary) D Gálfi	5
(Hungary) A Bondár	7^{7}	7
8	(Romania) C Dinu	6^{3}	5

Second round
1	(Belarus) A Sasnovich	5	6	6^{3}
(Slovenia) T Zidanšek	7	2	7^{7}
(Netherlands) A Rus	4	3
(Bulgaria) V Tomova	6	6
4	(Belgium) Y Bonaventure	6	2	7
(North Macedonia) L Gjorcheska	1	6	5
(Hungary) D Gálfi	6	2	2
(Hungary) A Bondár	4	6	1^{r}

Quarterfinals
(Slovenia) T Zidanšek	1	0^{r}
(Bulgaria) V Tomova	6	0
4	(Belgium) Y Bonaventure	6	2	6
(Hungary) D Gálfi	4	6	2

Semifinals
(Bulgaria) V Tomova	6	6
4	(Belgium) Y Bonaventure	2	4

=== Bottom half ===
First round
6	(Czech Republic) J Malečková	6	6
(Italy) J Paolini	4	3
Q	(Serbia) M Kachar	6	6
(Hungary) V Lukács	4	4
(Hungary) R-L Jani	6	6
WC	(Hungary) N Totka	1	3
(Romania) A Cadanțu	7^{7}	6
Q	(Serbia) D Radanović	6^{5}	4
7	(Russia) E Alexandrova	7^{7}	6
WC	(Hungary) B Békefi	6^{4}	2
LL	(Romania) G Duca	1	2
Q	(Bosnia and Herzegovina) E Burgić Bucko	6	6
(Turkey) B Eraydın	6	6
Q	(Romania) C Ene	3	1
WC	(Hungary) Á Bukta	4	2
2	(Greece) M Sakkari	6	6

Second round
6	(Czech Republic) J Malečková	6	6
Q	(Serbia) M Kachar	0	2
(Hungary) R-L Jani	6	6
(Romania) A Cadanțu	4	3
7	(Russia) E Alexandrova	6	6
Q	(Bosnia and Herzegovina) E Burgić Bucko	4	3
(Turkey) B Eraydın	3	4
2	(Greece) M Sakkari	6	6

Quarterfinals
6	(Czech Republic) J Malečková	6	6^{1}	2
(Hungary) R-L Jani	4	7^{7}	6
7	(Russia) E Alexandrova	5	7^{10}	3
2	(Greece) M Sakkari	7	6^{8}	6

Semifinals
(Hungary) R-L Jani	4	7	1
2	(Greece) M Sakkari	6	5	6
