= 2012 Open GDF Suez de Touraine – Doubles =

Doubles
- 2012 Open GDF Suez de Touraine

Final
- Champions: (France) Séverine Beltrame (France) Julie Coin
- Runners-up: (Poland) Justyna Jegiołka (Latvia) Diāna Marcinkēviča
- Score: 7–5, 6–4

Events
Singles	Doubles
- Open GDF Suez de Touraine

Lyudmyla Kichenok and Nadiya Kichenok were the defending champions, but both players chose not to participate.

Séverine Beltrame and Julie Coin won the title defeating Justyna Jegiołka and Diāna Marcinkēviča in the final 7–5, 6–4.

== Seeds ==
1. (France) Stéphanie Foretz Gacon / (France) Kristina Mladenovic (quarterfinals, withdrew)
2. (France) Séverine Beltrame / (France) Julie Coin (champions)
3. (Switzerland) Amra Sadiković / (Croatia) Ana Vrljić (quarterfinals)
4. (Portugal) Maria João Koehler / (Belarus) Polina Pekhova (quarterfinals)

== Draw ==
Key

- Q = Qualifier
- WC = Wild card
- LL = Lucky loser
- Alt = Alternate
- ITF = ITF entry
- PR = Protected ranking
- SR = Special ranking
- SE = Special exempt
- JE = Junior exempt
- JR = Junior Accelerator Programme entrant
- CO = College Accelerator Programme entrant
- NG = Next Gen Accelerator Program entrant
- w/o = Walkover
- r = Retired
- d = Defaulted

=== Draw ===
First round
1	(France) S Foretz Gacon (France) K Mladenovic	6	7
(Russia) M Kondratieva (France) S Lefèvre	3	5
(Poland) J Jegiołka (Latvia) D Marcinkēviča	6	6^{4}	[10]
(Russia) M Melnikova (Russia) M Shamayko	4	7^{7}	[8]
4	(Portugal) MJ Koehler (Belarus) P Pekhova	6	6
(Poland) M Domachowska (Slovenia) P Rampre	1	4
(France) C de Bernardi (France) A Hesse	4	4
(Russia) I Khromacheva (Ukraine) E Svitolina	6	6
(Czech Republic) H Birnerová (Slovakia) Z Luknárová	2	1
(Ukraine) V Kapshay (Ukraine) M Zanevska	6	6
(France) I Brémond (Bulgaria) E Kostova	6	1	[8]
3	(Switzerland) A Sadiković (Croatia) A Vrljić	4	6	[10]
(United States) M Brengle (United States) A Riske	2	2
(Poland) M Linette (Poland) S Zaniewska	6	6
(Brazil) PC Gonçalves (Brazil) R Vaisemberg	6	5	[10]
2	(France) S Beltrame (France) J Coin	2	7	[12]

Quarterfinals
1	(France) S Foretz Gacon (France) K Mladenovic
(Poland) J Jegiołka (Latvia) D Marcinkēviča	w/o
4	(Portugal) MJ Koehler (Belarus) P Pekhova	0	6	[4]
(Russia) I Khromacheva (Ukraine) E Svitolina	6	2	[10]
(Ukraine) V Kapshay (Ukraine) M Zanevska	4	7^{7}	[10]
3	(Switzerland) A Sadiković (Croatia) A Vrljić	6	6^{2}	[2]
(Poland) M Linette (Poland) S Zaniewska	4	1
2	(France) S Beltrame (France) J Coin	6	6

Semifinals
(Poland) J Jegiołka (Latvia) D Marcinkēviča	2
(Russia) I Khromacheva (Ukraine) E Svitolina	2	r
(Ukraine) V Kapshay (Ukraine) M Zanevska	2	1
2	(France) S Beltrame (France) J Coin	6	6

Finals
(Poland) J Jegiołka (Latvia) D Marcinkēviča	5	4
2	(France) S Beltrame (France) J Coin	7	6
