= 2016 Open Engie de Touraine =

- Date: 17–23 October
- Edition: 12th
- Category: ITF Women's Circuit
- Prize money: $50,000
- Surface: Hard / Indoor
- Location: Joué-lès-Tours, France

Champions

Singles
- (Belgium) Maryna Zanevska

Doubles
- (Serbia) Ivana Jorović / (Netherlands) Lesley Kerkhove
- Open Engie de Touraine

The 2016 Open Engie de Touraine was a professional tennis tournament played on indoor hard courts. It was the 12th edition of the tournament and part of the 2016 ITF Women's Circuit, offering a total of $50,000 in prize money. It took place in Joué-lès-Tours, France, on 17–23 October 2016.

== Singles main draw entrants ==
=== Seeds ===
Country	Player	Rank^{1}	Seed
SRB	Ivana Jorović	139	1
BEL	Maryna Zanevska	149	2
CZE	Barbora Štefková	167	3
NED	Lesley Kerkhove	183	4
TUN	Ons Jabeur	197	5
ROU	Andreea Mitu	198	6
CHI	Daniela Seguel	200	7
FRA	Amandine Hesse	206	8

- ^{1} Rankings as of 10 October 2016.

=== Other entrants ===
The following player received a wildcard into the singles main draw:

- (France) Manon Arcangioli
- (France) Lou Brouleau
- (France) Elixane Lechemia
- (France) Margot Yerolymos

The following players received entry from the qualifying draw:

- (France) Théo Gravouil
- (Latvia) Diāna Marcinkēviča
- (Belarus) Sviatlana Pirazhenka
- (Russia) Alena Tarasova

The following players received entry by a lucky loser spot:

- (France) Emmanuelle Salas

== Champions ==
=== Singles ===
- (Belgium) Maryna Zanevska def. (Romania) Elena Gabriela Ruse, 6–3, 6–3

=== Doubles ===
- (Serbia) Ivana Jorović / (Netherlands) Lesley Kerkhove def. (Romania) Alexandra Cadanțu / (Russia) Ekaterina Yashina, 6–3, 7–5
