= 2014 Open GDF Suez de Touraine – Singles =

Singles
- 2014 Open GDF Suez de Touraine

Final
- Champion: (Germany) Carina Witthöft
- Runner-up: (Poland) Urszula Radwańska
- Score: 6–3, 7–6^{(8–6)}

Events
Singles	Doubles
← 2013 ·	Open GDF Suez de Touraine	· 2015 →

Mirjana Lučić-Baroni was the defending champion, having won the event in 2013, but chose not to participate.

Carina Witthöft won the tournament, defeating Urszula Radwańska in the final, 6–3, 7–6^{(8–6)}.

== Seeds ==
1. (Czech Republic) Kristýna Plíšková (first round)
2. (Hungary) Tímea Babos (second round)
3. (Austria) Tamira Paszek (first round; retired)
4. (Germany) Carina Witthöft (champion)
5. (Romania) Andreea Mitu (semifinals)
6. (France) Claire Feuerstein (first round)
7. (Ukraine) Yuliya Beygelzimer (second round)
8. (Ukraine) Nadiia Kichenok (first round)

== Main draw ==
=== Key ===
- Q = Qualifier
- WC = Wild card
- LL = Lucky loser
- Alt = Alternate
- SE = Special exempt
- PR = Protected ranking
- ITF = ITF entry
- JE = Junior exempt
- w/o = Walkover
- r = Retired
- d = Defaulted
- SR = Special ranking

=== Finals ===
Semifinals
Q	(France) Manon Arcangioli	6	2	4
4	(Germany) Carina Witthöft	4	6	6
(Poland) Urszula Radwańska	7	6
5	(Romania) Andreea Mitu	5	4

Final
4	(Germany) Carina Witthöft	6	7^{8}
(Poland) Urszula Radwańska	3	6^{6}

=== Top half ===
First round
1	(Czech Republic) Kr Plíšková	3	5
(France) V Razzano	6	7
(Ukraine) G Poznikhirenko	1	3
Q	(France) M Arcangioli	6	6
(Netherlands) Q Lemoine	6	6
(France) A Hesse	4	3
WC	(France) L Brouleau	4	7^{7}	2
7	(Ukraine) Y Beygelzimer	6	6^{4}	6
4	(Germany) C Witthöft	6	6
WC	(France) J Boualem	0	2
(United Kingdom) T Moore	6	5	4
(France) S Foretz	0	7	6
(Italy) ME Camerin	6	6
(France) M Georges	3	3
(Latvia) J Ostapenko	6	6
8/WC	(Ukraine) N Kichenok	2	2

Second round
(France) V Razzano	3	5
Q	(France) M Arcangioli	6	7
(Netherlands) Q Lemoine	7^{7}	7^{7}
7	(Ukraine) Y Beygelzimer	6^{4}	6^{5}
4	(Germany) C Witthöft	7	6
(France) S Foretz	5	2
(Italy) ME Camerin	2	6^{3}
(Latvia) J Ostapenko	6	7^{7}

Quarterfinals
Q	(France) M Arcangioli	6	6
(Netherlands) Q Lemoine	0	3
4	(Germany) C Witthöft	6	6
(Latvia) J Ostapenko	2	3

Semifinals
Q	(France) M Arcangioli	6	2	4
4	(Germany) C Witthöft	4	6	6

=== Bottom half ===
First round
6	(France) C Feuerstein	7^{7}	1	3
(Italy) G Gatto-Monticone	6^{5}	6	6
Q	(Croatia) A Lekaj	6	7
(Switzerland) X Knoll	3	5
(France) C Sibille	6	6
(France) F Ferro	4	3
(Poland) U Radwańska	6	0
3	(Austria) T Paszek	3	0^{r}
5	(Romania) A Mitu	6	6
(Chile) D Seguel	0	4
Q	(Austria) P König	2	2
Q	(Croatia) J Fett	6	6
WC	(France) J Ponchet	1	3
(Italy) A Brianti	6	6
(France) J Coin	6	6^{5}	3
2	(Hungary) T Babos	4	7^{7}	6

Second round
(Italy) G Gatto-Monticone	6	7
Q	(Croatia) A Lekaj	1	5
(France) C Sibille	3	0
(Poland) U Radwańska	6	6
5	(Romania) A Mitu	7^{7}	6
Q	(Croatia) J Fett	6^{2}	4
(Italy) A Brianti	6	2	6
2	(Hungary) T Babos	3	6	3

Quarterfinals
(Italy) G Gatto-Monticone	4	6	6^{1}
(Poland) U Radwańska	6	3	7^{7}
5	(Romania) A Mitu	4	6	6
(Italy) A Brianti	6	0	3

Semifinals
(Poland) U Radwańska	7	6
5	(Romania) A Mitu	5	4
