= 2016 Open Engie de Touraine – Doubles =

Doubles
- 2016 Open Engie de Touraine

Final
- Champions: (Serbia) Ivana Jorović (Netherlands) Lesley Kerkhove
- Runners-up: (Romania) Alexandra Cadanțu (Russia) Ekaterina Yashina
- Score: 6–3, 7–5

Events
Singles	Doubles
- Open Engie de Touraine

Alexandra Cadanțu and Cristina Dinu were the defending champions, but Dinu chose not to participate. Cadanțu partnered Ekaterina Yashina, but they were defeated in the final by Ivana Jorović and Lesley Kerkhove, 6–3, 7–5.

== Seeds ==
1. (Netherlands) Quirine Lemoine / (Netherlands) Eva Wacanno (quarterfinals)
2. (Romania) Alexandra Cadanțu / (Russia) Ekaterina Yashina (final)
3. (France) Amandine Hesse / (Czech Republic) Barbora Štefková (withdrew)
4. (Italy) Alice Matteucci / (Italy) Camilla Rosatello (withdrew)

== Draw ==
Key

- Q = Qualifier
- WC = Wild card
- LL = Lucky loser
- Alt = Alternate
- ITF = ITF entry
- PR = Protected ranking
- SR = Special ranking
- SE = Special exempt
- JE = Junior exempt
- JR = Junior Accelerator Programme entrant
- CO = College Accelerator Programme entrant
- NG = Next Gen Accelerator Program entrant
- w/o = Walkover
- r = Retired
- d = Defaulted

First round
1	(Netherlands) Q Lemoine (Netherlands) E Wacanno	2	6	[10]
(Bosnia and Herzegovina) A Husarić (Sweden) C Lister	6	2	[6]
(Georgia (country)) E Gorgodze (Latvia) D Marcinkēviča	6	2	[6]
WC	(France) F Ferro (France) M Yerolymos	1	6	[10]
Alt	(Greece) E Danillidou (Switzerland) L Sabino	6	6
(Croatia) S Njirić (France) I Ramialison	2	4
(Serbia) I Jorović (Netherlands) L Kerkhove	6	6
(Belarus) V Lapko (Romania) EG Ruse	2	3
(Belarus) S Pirazhenka (Russia) A Tarasova	6	6
WC	(Spain) Á Fita Boluda (Australia) I Wallace	4	3
(Russia) K Bekker (United States) C Scholl	6	4	[10]
Alt	(Belgium) M Benoît (Russia) M Shamayko	4	6	[6]
(Moldova) A Perper (Romania) IL Roșca	1	5
WC	(France) M Partaud (France) J Ponchet	6	7
(France) M Arcangioli (France) C Paquet	6^{6}	3
2	(Romania) A Cadanțu (Russia) E Yashina	7^{8}	6

Quarterfinals
1	(Netherlands) Q Lemoine (Netherlands) E Wacanno	3	6	[9]
WC	(France) F Ferro (France) M Yerolymos	6	3	[11]
Alt	(Greece) E Danillidou (Switzerland) L Sabino	4	2
(Serbia) I Jorović (Netherlands) L Kerkhove	6	6
(Belarus) S Pirazhenka (Russia) A Tarasova	6	6
(Russia) K Bekker (United States) C Scholl	4	4
WC	(France) M Partaud (France) J Ponchet	1	6^{5}
2	(Romania) A Cadanțu (Russia) E Yashina	6	7^{7}

Semifinals
WC	(France) F Ferro (France) M Yerolymos	4	4
(Serbia) I Jorović (Netherlands) L Kerkhove	6	6
(Belarus) S Pirazhenka (Russia) A Tarasova	6^{3}	1
2	(Romania) A Cadanțu (Russia) E Yashina	7^{7}	6

Final
(Serbia) I Jorović (Netherlands) L Kerkhove	6	7
2	(Romania) A Cadanțu (Russia) E Yashina	3	5
