= 2012 Open GDF Suez de Touraine – Singles =

Singles
- 2012 Open GDF Suez de Touraine

Final
- Champion: (Puerto Rico) Monica Puig
- Runner-up: (Portugal) Maria João Koehler
- Score: 3–6, 6–4, 6–1

Events
Singles	Doubles
- Open GDF Suez de Touraine

Alison Riske was the defending champion, but lost to Maria João Koehler in the semifinals.

Monica Puig won the title defeating Maria João Koehler in the final 3–6, 6–4, 6–1.

== Seeds ==
1. (Russia) Alexandra Panova (first round)
2. (France) Kristina Mladenovic (second round)
3. (France) Stéphanie Foretz Gacon (second round)
4. (Austria) Yvonne Meusburger (quarterfinals)
5. (Portugal) Maria João Koehler (final)
6. (France) Claire Feuerstein (first round)
7. (United States) Alison Riske (semifinals)
8. (France) Irena Pavlovic (first round)

== Main draw ==
Key

- Q = Qualifier
- WC = Wild card
- LL = Lucky loser
- Alt = Alternate
- ITF = ITF entry
- PR = Protected ranking
- SR = Special ranking
- SE = Special exempt
- JE = Junior exempt
- JR = Junior Accelerator Programme entrant
- CO = College Accelerator Programme entrant
- NG = Next Gen Accelerator Program entrant
- w/o = Walkover
- r = Retired
- d = Defaulted

=== Finals ===
Semifinals
(Puerto Rico) Monica Puig	6	7^{7}
JE	(Belgium) An-Sophie Mestach	2	6^{0}
5	(Portugal) Maria João Koehler	6	6
7	(United States) Alison Riske	1	2

Final
(Puerto Rico) Monica Puig	3	6	6
5	(Portugal) Maria João Koehler	6	4	1

=== Top half ===
First round
1	(Russia) A Panova	6	4	1
(Puerto Rico) M Puig	2	6	6
(Russia) I Khromacheva	6	6
Q	(Italy) A Remondina	2	4
(Slovenia) P Rampre	5	6	4
(Poland) S Zaniewska	7	3	6
(Ukraine) O Savchuk	7	7
6	(France) C Feuerstein	5	5
4	(Austria) Y Meusburger	6	4	7
WC	(France) J Coin	3	6	5
WC	(France) C Sibille	7^{7}	7^{7}
(Kazakhstan) Y Putintseva	6^{2}	6^{5}
JE	(Belgium) A-S Mestach	6	6
WC	(France) C de Bernardi	2	2
(Poland) M Domachowska	6	6
8	(France) I Pavlovic	2	2

Second round
(Puerto Rico) M Puig	6	6
(Russia) I Khromacheva	4	3
(Poland) S Zaniewska	4	2
(Ukraine) O Savchuk	6	6
4	(Austria) Y Meusburger	6	6
WC	(France) C Sibille	4	2
JE	(Belgium) A-S Mestach	7	7^{7}
(Poland) M Domachowska	5	6^{5}

Quarterfinals
(Puerto Rico) M Puig	6	6
(Ukraine) O Savchuk	0	2
4	(Austria) Y Meusburger	3	3
JE	(Belgium) A-S Mestach	6	6

Semifinals
(Puerto Rico) M Puig	6	7^{7}
JE	(Belgium) A-S Mestach	2	6^{0}

=== Bottom half ===
First round
5	(Portugal) MJ Koehler	7^{7}	2	6
(Ukraine) E Svitolina	6^{3}	6	0
(Germany) S Gronert	4	1^{r}
WC	(France) A Hesse	6	4
(United States) M Brengle	6	3	2
(Uzbekistan) A Amanmuradova	3	6	6
(Bulgaria) E Kostova	6	2	1
3	(France) S Foretz Gacon	1	6	6
7	(United States) A Riske	6	7^{7}
Q	(Latvia) D Marcinkēviča	2	6^{4}
(Switzerland) A Sadiković	4	6	6
(France) S Beltrame	6	1	4
Q	(Ukraine) M Zanevska	7	2	6
Q	(Croatia) A Vrljić	5	6	4
(France) I Brémond	4	6^{3}
2	(France) K Mladenovic	6	7^{7}

Second round
5	(Portugal) MJ Koehler	2	6	6
WC	(France) A Hesse	6	1	0
(Uzbekistan) A Amanmuradova	6	6
3	(France) S Foretz Gacon	3	3
7	(United States) A Riske	6	6^{3}	6
(Switzerland) A Sadiković	1	7^{7}	2
Q	(Ukraine) M Zanevska	7^{7}	6^{0}	6
2	(France) K Mladenovic	6^{5}	7^{7}	4

Quarterfinals
5	(Portugal) MJ Koehler	6	6
(Uzbekistan) A Amanmuradova	1	3
7	(United States) A Riske	4	6	6
Q	(Ukraine) M Zanevska	6	2	2

Semifinals
5	(Portugal) MJ Koehler	6	6
7	(United States) A Riske	1	2
