= Raymond Lory =

French politician

- Born: Raymond Pierre Lory; August 17, 1926; Joué-lès-Tours, Indre-et-Loire, France
- Died: January 28, 2018 (aged 91); Bordeaux, Gironde, France
- Occupation: Politician
- Political party: Union for French Democracy

Representative of Indre-et-Loire
- In office April 2, 1986 – May 14, 1988

General Councilor of Indre-et-Loire
- In office 1985–1994

General Councilor of Indre-et-Loire
- In office 1973–1979

Mayor of Joué-lès-Tours
- In office 1956–1995

Raymond Lory (17 August 1926 – 28 January 2018) was a French politician who served as mayor of Joué-lès-Tours between 1956 and 1995. He was elected to the National Assembly via proportional representation in 1986, where he represented Indre-et-Loire until 1988.

== Biography ==
As the mayor of Joué-lès-Tours from 1956 to 1995, Raymond Lory oversaw the development and transformation of the city. Under his term, the population of the city grew from 6,500 to 36,000, which made it the second largest city in Indre-et-Loire.

During his term as the representative of Indre-et-Loire, he was behind Michelin's move to Joué-lès-Tours, kicking off the city's development.
