= Jouy =

Jouy may refer to:

== Communes in France ==
- Jouy, Eure-et-Loir, in the Eure-et-Loir département
- Jouy, Yonne, in the Yonne département
- Jouy-aux-Arches, in the Moselle département
- Jouy-en-Argonne, in the Meuse département
- Jouy-en-Josas, in the Yvelines département
- Jouy-en-Pithiverais, in the Loiret département
- Jouy-le-Châtel, in the Seine-et-Marne département
- Jouy-le-Moutier, in the Val-d'Oise département
- Jouy-le-Potier, in the Loiret département
- Jouy-lès-Reims, in the Marne département
- Jouy-Mauvoisin, in the Yvelines département
- Jouy-sous-Thelle, in the Oise département
- Jouy-sur-Eure, in the Eure département
- Jouy-sur-Morin, in the Seine-et-Marne département

== Persons ==
- Pierre Louis Jouy (1856–1894), American ornithologist, naturalist, and ethnographer
- Victor Joseph Etienne de Jouy, a French dramatist
