= Naturtex Women's Open =

ITF Women's Tour
- Event name: Szeged
- Location: Szeged, Hungary
- Venue: Gellért Szabadidőközpont
- Category: ITF Women's Circuit
- Surface: Clay
- Draw: 32S/32Q/16D
- Prize money: $50,000

The Naturtex Women's Open was a tournament for professional female tennis players played on outdoor clay courts. The event was classified as a $50,000 ITF Women's Circuit tournament and was held in Szeged, Hungary, only in 2016.

== Past finals ==
=== Singles ===
Year	Champion	Runner-up	Score
2016	(Bulgaria) Viktoriya Tomova	(Greece) Maria Sakkari	4–6, 6–0, 6–4

=== Doubles ===
Year	Champions	Runners-up	Score
2016	(Romania) Cristina Dinu (North Macedonia) Lina Gjorcheska	(Poland) Justyna Jegiołka (Argentina) Guadalupe Pérez Rojas	4–6, 6–1, [10–4]
