= Gouy =

Gouy may refer to:

== Places ==
=== Belgium ===
- Gouy-lez-Piéton

=== Communes in France ===
- Gouy, Aisne, in the department of Aisne
- Gouy, Seine-Maritime, in the department of Seine-Maritime
- Gouy-en-Artois, in the department of Pas-de-Calais
- Gouy-en-Ternois, in the department of Pas-de-Calais
- Gouy-les-Groseillers, in the department of Oise
- Gouy-Saint-André, in the department of Pas-de-Calais
- Gouy-Servins, in the department of Pas-de-Calais
- Gouy-sous-Bellonne, in the department of Pas-de-Calais

== Other uses ==
- Louis Georges Gouy, a French physicist
  - Gouy balance
