= Open de Touraine =

Open Engie de Touraine

ITF Women's Tour
- Event name: Open Engie de Touraine (2015–present); Open GDF Suez de Touraine (–2014)
- Location: Joué-lès-Tours, France
- Venue: Tennis Club Jocondien
- Category: ITF Women's Circuit
- Surface: Hard (indoor)
- Draw: 32S/32Q/16D
- Prize money: $25,000
- Website: Website

The Open Engie de Touraine (previously known as the Open GDF Suez de Touraine) is a tournament for professional female tennis players played on indoor hardcourts. The event is classified as a $25,000 ITF Women's Circuit tournament and has been held in Joué-lès-Tours, France, since from 2005 to 2018. From 2005 till 2016, the event was a $50,000 tournament. It was not held from 2019 to 2021, but returned in 2022 as a $25,000 event.

== Past finals ==
=== Singles ===
Year	Champion	Runner-up	Score
2024	Yuliya Hatouka	(Turkey) Ayla Aksu	7–6^{(7–4)}, 7–6^{(10–8)}
2023	(China) Wei Sijia	(China) Bai Zhuoxuan	6–4, 7–6^{(7–5)}
2022	(Belgium) Magali Kempen	(Germany) Nastasja Schunk	6–3, 6–4
2019–21	not held		
2018	(France) Chloé Paquet	(France) Myrtille Georges	7–6^{(7–5)}, 6–2
2017	(Czech Republic) Tereza Smitková	(France) Myrtille Georges	6–3, 7–5
2016	(Belgium) Maryna Zanevska	(Romania) Elena Gabriela Ruse	6–3, 6–3
2015	(Ukraine) Olga Fridman	(Czech Republic) Kristýna Plíšková	6–2, 3–6, 6–1
2014	(Germany) Carina Witthöft	(Poland) Urszula Radwańska	6–3, 7–6^{(8–6)}
2013	(Croatia) Mirjana Lučić-Baroni	(Belgium) An-Sophie Mestach	6–4, 6–2
2012	(Puerto Rico) Monica Puig	(Portugal) Maria João Koehler	3–6, 6–4, 6–1
2011	(United States) Alison Riske	(Uzbekistan) Akgul Amanmuradova	2–6, 6–2, 7–5
2010	(United States) Alison Riske	(Russia) Vesna Manasieva	5–7, 6–4, 6–1
2009	(Sweden) Sofia Arvidsson	(Australia) Jelena Dokić	6–2, 7–6^{(9–7)}
2008	(France) Julie Coin	(France) Stéphanie Foretz	7–6^{(9–7)}, 7–6^{(7–3)}
2007	(Sweden) Sofia Arvidsson	(Germany) Kristina Barrois	6–3, 6–2
2006	(Italy) Roberta Vinci	(France) Virginie Razzano	6–3, 6–1
2005	(France) Émilie Loit	(Croatia) Jelena Kostanić	6–2, 6–1

=== Doubles ===
Year	Champions	Runners-up	Score
2024	(United Kingdom) Sarah Beth Grey (Switzerland) Leonie Küng	(Ukraine) Anastasiia Firman (Switzerland) Chelsea Fontenel	6–4, 6–2
2023	(Slovenia) Veronika Erjavec (Lithuania) Justina Mikulskytė	(United States) Chiara Scholl (Bosnia and Herzegovina) Anita Wagner	6–4, 6–0
2022	(United Kingdom) Emily Appleton (United Kingdom) Ali Collins	(Germany) Mona Barthel (Belgium) Yanina Wickmayer	2–6, 6–4, [10–6]
2019–21	not held		
2018	(Poland) Magdalena Fręch (Netherlands) Bibiane Schoofs	(Czech Republic) Miriam Kolodziejová (Czech Republic) Jesika Malečková	5–7, 6–2, [10–3]
2017	(United Kingdom) Sarah Beth Grey (United Kingdom) Samantha Murray	(Romania) Jaqueline Cristian (Romania) Elena-Gabriela Ruse	7–6^{(7–3)}, 6–3
2016	(Serbia) Ivana Jorović (Netherlands) Lesley Kerkhove	(Romania) Alexandra Cadanțu (Russia) Ekaterina Yashina	6–3, 7–5
2015	(Romania) Alexandra Cadanțu (Romania) Cristina Dinu	(Switzerland) Viktorija Golubic (Italy) Alice Matteucci	7–5, 6–3
2014	(France) Stéphanie Foretz (France) Amandine Hesse	(Italy) Alberta Brianti (Italy) Maria Elena Camerin	default
2013	(France) Julie Coin (Croatia) Ana Vrljić	(Czech Republic) Andrea Hlaváčková (Netherlands) Michaëlla Krajicek	6–3, 4–6, [15–13]
2012	(France) Séverine Beltrame (France) Julie Coin	(Poland) Justyna Jegiołka (Latvia) Diāna Marcinkēviča	7–5, 6–4
2011	(Ukraine) Lyudmyla Kichenok (Ukraine) Nadiya Kichenok	(Greece) Eirini Georgatou (France) Irena Pavlovic	6–2, 6–0
2010	(Germany) Tatjana Malek (France) Irena Pavlovic	(France) Stéphanie Cohen-Aloro (Tunisia) Selima Sfar	6–4, 5–7, [10–8]
2009	(France) Youlia Fedossova (Tunisia) Selima Sfar	(France) Stéphanie Cohen-Aloro (France) Aurélie Védy	4–6, 6–0, [10–8]
2008	(Germany) Kristina Barrois (Bosnia and Herzegovina) Mervana Jugić-Salkić	(France) Julie Coin (France) Violette Huck	6–2, 7–6^{(7–3)}
2007	(Poland) Klaudia Jans (Poland) Alicja Rosolska	(Czech Republic) Petra Cetkovská (Czech Republic) Barbora Záhlavová-Strýcová	6–2, 7–5
2006	(France) Stéphanie Cohen-Aloro (Spain) María José Martínez Sánchez	(Czech Republic) Renata Voráčová (Czech Republic) Barbora Záhlavová-Strýcová	7–5, 7–5
2005	(Croatia) Jelena Kostanić (Croatia) Matea Mezak	(Hungary) Zsófia Gubacsi (Belarus) Darya Kustova	6–4, 6–4
