= Olga Fridman =

Ukrainian-Israeli tennis player

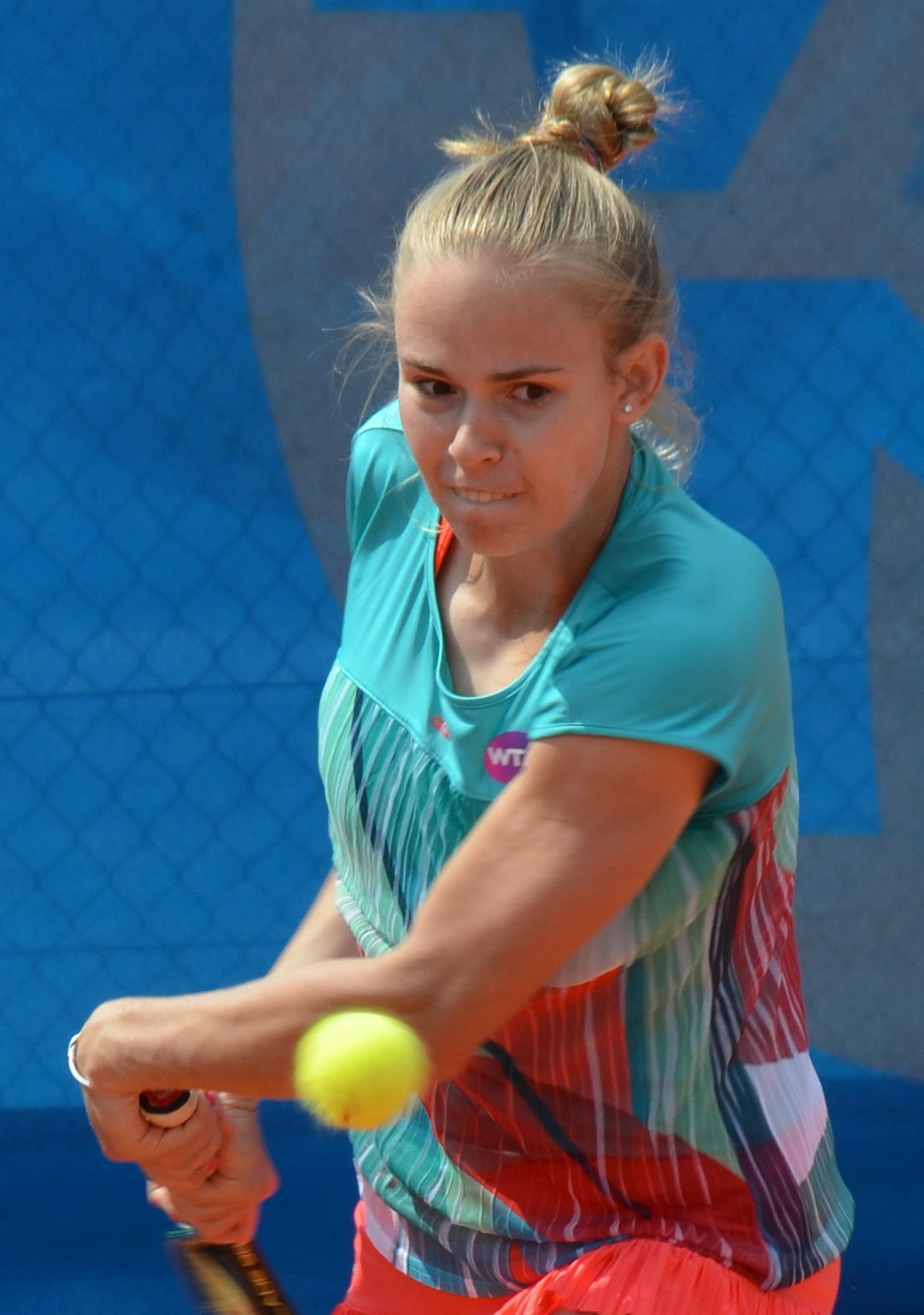
- At the 2016 Nürnberger Versicherungscup
- Full name: Olga Olehivna Fridman
- Native name: Ольга Фрідман אולגה פרידמן
- Country (sports): Ukraine
- Residence: Kyiv, Ukraine
- Born: 30 September 1998 (age 26); Kyiv
- Height: 1.77 m (5 ft 10 in)
- Plays: Left-handed (two-handed backhand)
- Prize money: $30,397

Singles
- Career record: 83–37
- Career titles: 2 ITF
- Highest ranking: No. 231 (23 May 2016)

Grand Slam singles results
- Australian Open Junior: 2R (2013)
- French Open Junior: 1R (2014)
- US Open Junior: 3R (2014)

Doubles
- Career record: 3–4
- Career titles: 0

Grand Slam doubles results
- Australian Open Junior: 2R (2015)
- French Open Junior: 1R (2014)
- US Open Junior: QF (2014)

Olga Olehivna Fridman (Ukrainian: Ольга Олегівна Фрідман, Hebrew: אולגה פרידמן; born 30 September 1998) is a Ukrainian-Israeli former professional tennis player and the 2015 female Israeli tennis champion.

As a junior, Fridman has a career-high world ranking of 12, achieved on 24 March 2014. She has a career-high singles ranking of 231 by the WTA, achieved on 23 May 2016, and she won two singles titles on the ITF Women's Circuit.

== Early and personal life ==
Fridman was born to a wealthy family in Kyiv, the daughter of Ukrainian-Israeli oligarch Oleg Fridman. Although she represented Ukraine internationally, Fridman also holds Israeli citizenship.

In December 2015, she had lived in Israel in recent years, and said: "I’d really like to represent Israel, but at the moment it depends on my parents. I really love the country and I believe it will eventually happen."

== Tennis career ==
Fridman made her WTA Tour main-draw debut at the 2015 Baku Cup in the doubles event, partnering Elizaveta Ianchuk.

She became the 2015 national champion at the age of 17, beating world No. 126, Julia Glushko, 6–2, 6–2 in the final of the Israeli championship.

In January 2016, she made it to the final of the $25k event in Daytona Beach, where she was defeated by Ons Jabeur, in three sets.

The last tournament Fridman played was a $25k event in Florida, in January 2017.

== ITF finals ==
=== Singles (2–2) ===
Legend $50,000 tournaments $25,000 tournaments $10,000 tournaments	Finals by surface Hard (2–1) Clay (0–1)

Result	No.	Date	Tournament	Surface	Opponent	Score
Win	1.	2 August 2014	ITF İstanbul, Turkey	Hard	(China) Ye Qiuyu	7–5, 6–4
Loss	1.	13 December 2014	ITF Tel Aviv, Israel	Hard	(Russia) Marta Paigina	1–6, 6–2, 6–7^{(3)}
Win	2.	25 October 2015	Open de Touraine, France	Hard (i)	(Czech Republic) Kristýna Plíšková	6–2, 3–6, 6–1
Loss	2.	17 January 2016	ITF Daytona Beach, United States	Clay	(Tunisia) Ons Jabeur	6–0, 2–6, 4–6

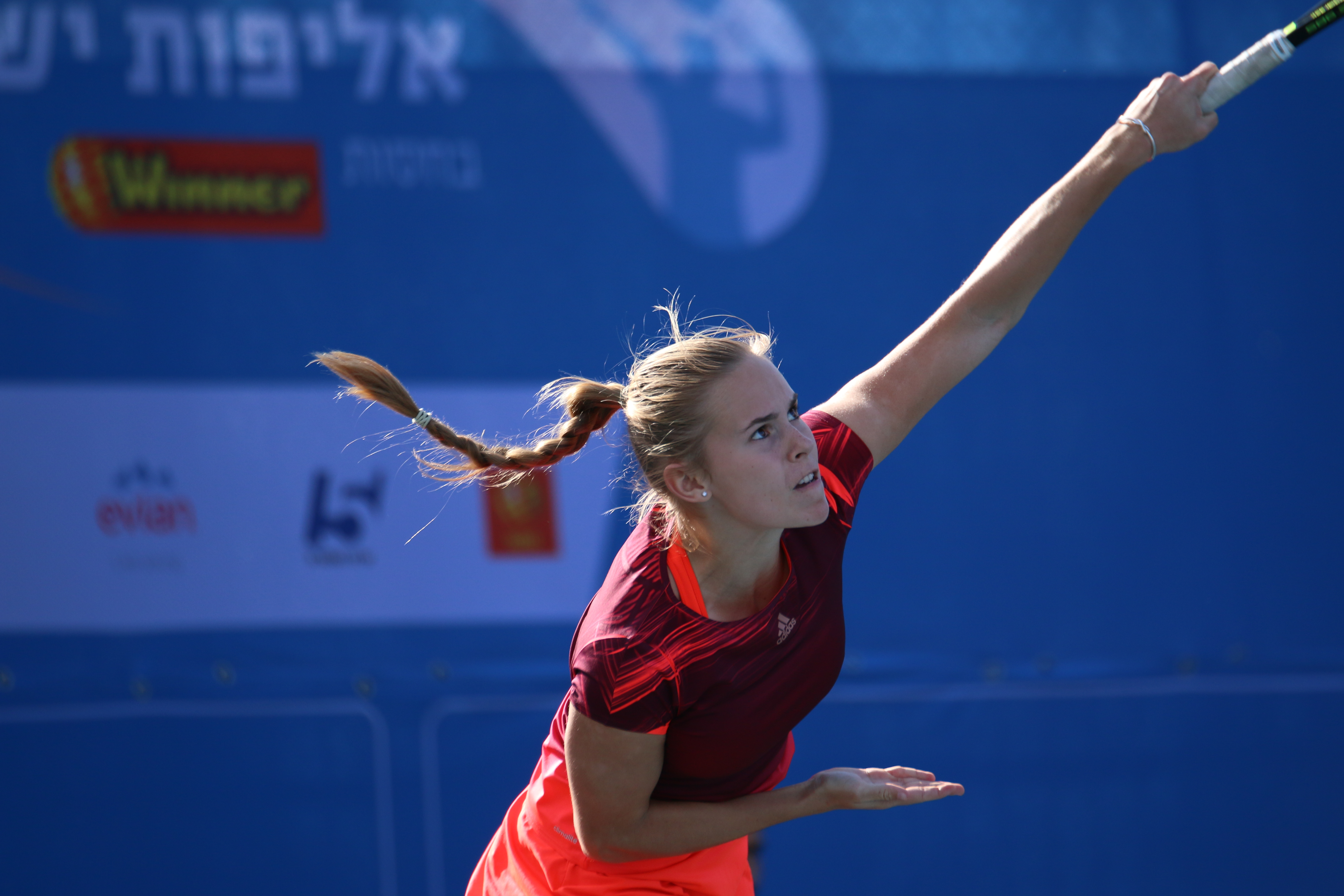
Fridman at the 2015 Israeli championship

=== Doubles (0–1) ===
Result	Date	Tournament	Surface	Partner	Opponents	Score
Loss	4 July 2014	ITF Prokuplje, Serbia	Clay	(Ukraine) Elizaveta Ianchuk	(North Macedonia) Lina Gjorcheska (Australia) Alexandra Nancarrow	4–6, 6–7^{(5)}
