= Justyna Jegiołka =

Polish tennis player (born 1991)

- Country (sports): Poland
- Born: 17 September 1991 (age 34) Opole, Poland
- Height: 1.85 m (6 ft 1 in)
- Retired: 2018
- Prize money: $124,181

Singles
- Career record: 262–271
- Career titles: 2 ITF
- Highest ranking: No. 298 (6 October 2014)

Doubles
- Career record: 192–185
- Career titles: 16 ITF
- Highest ranking: No. 191 (18 April 2016)

Justyna Jegiołka (born 17 September 1991) is a Polish former tennis player.

She won two singles and 16 doubles titles on the ITF Circuit in her career. On 6 October 2014, she reached her best singles ranking of world No. 298. On 18 April 2016, she peaked at No. 191 in the doubles rankings.

Jegiołka made her WTA Tour debut at the 2013 Qatar Ladies Open, partnering with Veronika Kapshay in doubles; they lost in the first round to Shuko Aoyama and Megan Moulton-Levy.

== ITF Circuit finals ==
=== Singles: 7 (2 titles, 5 runner-ups) ===
Legend $50,000 tournaments $25,000 tournaments $10,000 tournaments	Finals by surface Hard (0–2) Clay (0–2) Carpet (2–1)

Result	No.	Date	Tournament	Surface	Opponent	Score
Win	1.	14 April 2008	ITF Fuerteventura, Spain	Carpet	(Spain) Irene Rehberger Bescos	6–3, 6–2
Win	2.	22 September 2008	ITF Volos, Greece	Carpet	(Slovenia) Mika Urbančič	6–4, 6–1
Loss	1.	7 September 2009	ITF Sarajevo, Bosnia & Herzegovina	Clay	(Slovakia) Zuzana Zlochová	6–7^{(2)}, 6–4, 4–6
Loss	2.	26 October 2009	ITF Volos, Greece	Carpet	(Italy) Giulia Gasparri	6–7^{(2)}, 2–6
Loss	3.	2 May 2011	ITF Edinburgh, United Kingdom	Clay	(Belgium) Alison Van Uytvanck	7–6^{(5)}, 4–6, 2–6
Loss	4.	23 January 2012	ITF Coimbra, Portugal	Hard	(Norway) Ulrikke Eikeri	6–2, 5–7, 3–6
Loss	5.	16 March 2015	ITF Oslo, Norway	Hard (i)	(Turkey) Pemra Özgen	6–2, 3–6, 6–7^{(5)}

=== Doubles: 35 (16 titles, 19 runner-ups) ===
Legend $100,000 tournaments $75,000 tournaments $50,000 tournaments $25,000 tournaments $10,000 tournaments	Finals by surface Hard (8–5) Clay (4–9) Carpet (4–4) Grass (0–1)

Result	No.	Date	Tournament	Surface	Partner	Opponents	Score
Loss	1.	14 May 2007	ITF Michalovce, Slovakia	Clay	(Poland) Olga Brózda	(Slovakia) Klaudia Boczová (Slovakia) Kristína Kučová	5–7, 6–4, 3–6
Loss	2.	8 Oct 2007	ITF Volos, Greece	Carpet	(Ukraine) Anastasiya Vasylyeva	(Poland) Olga Brózda (Poland) Magdalena Kiszczyńska	3–6, 6–7^{(5)}
Loss	3.	22 Sep 2008	ITF Volos, Greece	Carpet	(Switzerland) Milica Tomic	(Italy) Nicole Clerico (Slovenia) Mika Urbančič	2–6, 1–6
Win	1.	12 Oct 2009	ITF Mytilene, Greece	Hard	(Poland) Olga Brózda	(United Kingdom) Jocelyn Rae (United Kingdom) Jade Windley	6–4, 6–4
Loss	4.	19 Oct 2009	ITF Thessaloniki, Greece	Clay	(Poland) Olga Brózda	(Romania) Diana Enache (Romania) Camelia Hristea	7–5, 4–6, [9–11]
Win	2.	26 Oct 2009	ITF Volos, Greece	Carpet	(Poland) Olga Brózda	(Bulgaria) Tanya Germanlieva (Bulgaria) Dessislava Mladenova	4–6, 6–4, [10–7]
Win	3.	22 Feb 2010	ITF Portimão, Portugal	Hard	(Poland) Barbara Sobaszkiewicz	(Belgium) Gally De Wael (Estonia) Anett Schutting	3–6, 7–6^{(6)}, [10–5]
Win	4.	30 Aug 2010	ITF Gliwice, Poland	Clay	(Poland) Katarzyna Kawa	(Poland) Olga Brózda (Poland) Weronika Domagała	6–2, 7–6^{(4)}
Loss	5.	16 May 2011	ITF Moscow, Russia	Clay	(Ukraine) Veronika Kapshay	(Russia) Nadejda Guskova (Russia) Valeriya Solovyeva	3–6, 6–7^{(2)}
Win	5.	3 Oct 2011	ITF Madrid, Spain	Hard	(Germany) Kim Grajdek	(Argentina) Vanesa Furlanetto (Argentina) Aranza Salut	6–3, 6–3
Win	6.	30 Jan 2012	ITF Sunderland, UK	Hard (i)	(Latvia) Diāna Marcinkēviča	(Italy) Martina Caciotti (Italy) Anastasia Grymalska	6–4, 2–6, [10–6]
Loss	6.	8 Oct 2012	Open de Touraine, France	Hard (i)	(Latvia) Diāna Marcinkēviča	(France) Séverine Beltrame (France) Julie Coin	5–7, 4–6
Win	7.	15 Oct 2012	GB Pro-Series Glasgow, UK	Hard (i)	(Latvia) Diāna Marcinkēviča	(Italy) Nicole Clerico (Germany) Anna Zaja	6–2, 6–1
Loss	7.	18 Feb 2013	ITF Muzaffarnagar, India	Grass	(Ukraine) Veronika Kapshay	(Thailand) Nicha Lertpitaksinchai (Thailand) Peangtarn Plipuech	6–3, 4–6, [8–10]
Loss	8.	19 Aug 2013	Neva Cup, Russia	Clay	(Thailand) Noppawan Lertcheewakarn	(Russia) Victoria Kan (Ukraine) Ganna Poznikhirenko	2–6, 0–6
Loss	9.	11 Nov 2013	ITF Zawada, Poland	Carpet (i)	(Latvia) Diāna Marcinkēviča	(Czech Republic) Nikola Fraňková (Czech Republic) Tereza Smitková	1–6, 6–2, [8–10]
Loss	10.	16 June 2014	ITF Lenzerheide, Switzerland	Clay	(South Korea) Jang Su-jeong	(United States) Louisa Chirico (United States) Sanaz Marand	3–6, 4–6
Loss	11.	7 July 2014	ITF Gatineau, Canada	Hard	(Japan) Mana Ayukawa	(Japan) Hiroko Kuwata (Japan) Chiaki Okadaue	4–6, 3–6
Loss	12.	26 Jan 2015	ITF Sunderland, UK	Hard (i)	(Sweden) Cornelia Lister	(United Kingdom) Jocelyn Rae (United Kingdom) Anna Smith	3–6, 1–6
Win	8.	16 March 2015	ITF Oslo, Norway	Hard (i)	(Netherlands) Eva Wacanno	(Croatia) Jana Fett (Croatia) Adrijana Lekaj	6–1, 6–1
Win	9.	23 March 2015	ITF Port El Kantaoui, Tunisia	Hard	(Germany) Carolin Daniels	(Oman) Fatma Al-Nabhani (Bulgaria) Isabella Shinikova	7–5, 5–7, [10–5]
Win	10.	11 May 2015	ITF Raleigh, United States	Clay	(United States) Jan Abaza	(United States) Jacqueline Cako (Australia) Sally Peers	7–6^{(4)}, 4–6, [10–7]
Loss	13.	3 Aug 2015	ITF Koksijde, Belgium	Clay	(France) Sherazad Reix	(Belgium) Elise Mertens (Netherlands) Demi Schuurs	3–6, 2–6
Win	11.	19 Oct 2015	Challenger de Saguenay, Canada	Hard (i)	(Romania) Mihaela Buzărnescu	(Canada) Sharon Fichman (United States) Maria Sanchez	7–6^{(6)}, 4–6, [10–7]
Win	12.	16 Nov 2015	ITF Zawada, Poland	Carpet (i)	(Romania) Mihaela Buzărnescu	(Germany) Kim Grajdek (Russia) Ekaterina Yashina	6–2, 6–3
Loss	14.	14 March 2016	ITF Gonesse, France	Clay (i)	(Greece) Valentini Grammatikopoulou	(France) Marine Partaud (France) Laëtitia Sarrazin	1–6, 6–3, [6–10]
Win	13.	9 May 2016	ITF Naples, United States	Clay	(Brazil) Gabriela Cé	(United States) Sophie Chang (Mexico) Renata Zarazúa	6–1, 6–2
Loss	15.	13 June 2016	Szeged Open, Hungary	Clay	(Argentina) Guadalupe Pérez Rojas	(Romania) Cristina Dinu (North Macedonia) Lina Gjorcheska	6–4, 4–6, [4–10]
Loss	16.	1 Aug 2016	ITF Rebecq, Belgium	Clay	(United States) Chiara Scholl	(United Kingdom) Emily Arbuthnott (Germany) Katharina Hobgarski	1–6, 1–6
Win	14.	29 Aug 2016	ITF Sankt Pölten, Austria	Clay	(Hungary) Vanda Lukács	(Croatia) Mariana Dražić (Austria) Janina Toljan	6–4, 4–6, [11–9]
Loss	17.	12 Sep 2016	ITF Pétange, Luxembourg	Hard (i)	(Belgium) Magali Kempen	(Netherlands) Chayenne Ewijk (Netherlands) Rosalie van der Hoek	6–7^{(6)}, 3–6
Loss	18.	17 Oct 2016	ITF Hamamatsu, Japan	Carpet	(Chinese Taipei) Hsu Chieh-yu	(Croatia) Jana Fett (Japan) Ayaka Okuno	6–4, 6–7^{(5)}, [10–12]
Win	15.	14 Nov 2016	ITF Zawada, Poland	Carpet (i)	(Latvia) Diāna Marcinkēviča	(Belarus) Ilona Kremen (Belarus) Vera Lapko	6–4, 7–5
Win	16.	21 Nov 2016	ITF Solarino, Italy	Carpet	(Romania) Elena Bogdan	(Italy) Veronica Napolitano (Italy) Miriana Tona	4–6, 6–3, [10–7]
Loss	19.	6 Aug 2017	ITF Woking, UK	Hard	(Romania) Mihaela Buzărnescu	(Romania) Laura-Ioana Andrei (Czech Republic) Petra Krejsová	6–4, 2–6, [9–11]
