= Cristina Dinu =

Romanian tennis player

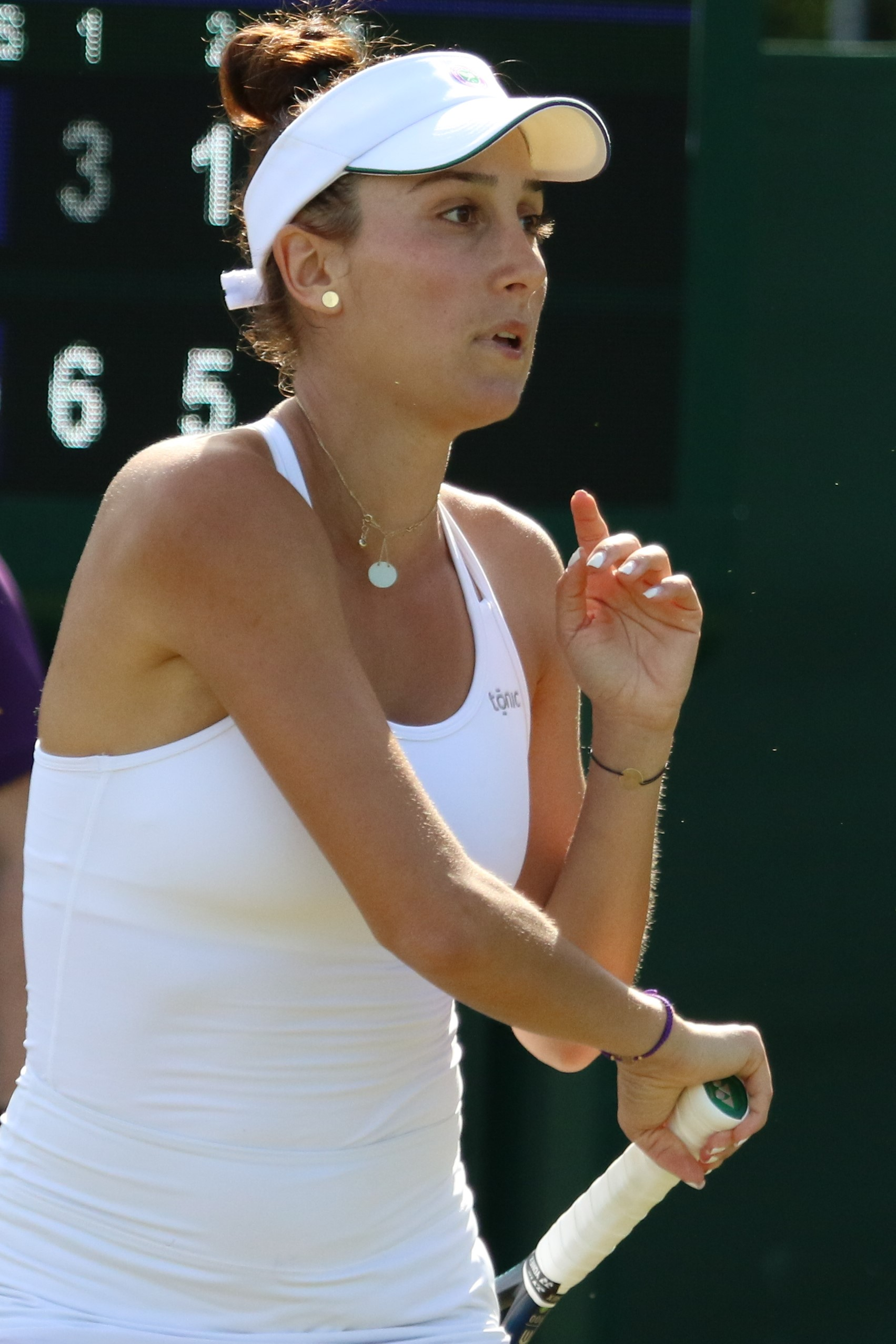
- Dinu at the 2022 Wimbledon Championships
- Country (sports): Romania
- Residence: Bucharest, Romania
- Born: 18 January 1993 (age 33) Bucharest
- Turned pro: 2009
- Plays: Right (two-handed backhand)
- Prize money: US$ 404,208

Singles
- Career record: 537–317
- Career titles: 25 ITF
- Highest ranking: No. 179 (30 September 2013)

Grand Slam singles results
- Australian Open: Q1 (2022)
- French Open: Q3 (2024)
- Wimbledon: Q1 (2022)
- US Open: Q1 (2013)

Doubles
- Career record: 324–200
- Career titles: 32 ITF
- Highest ranking: No. 153 (20 May 2019)

Team competitions
- Fed Cup: 0–8

Cristina Dinu (born 18 January 1993) is a Romanian inactive tennis player. On 30 September 2013, she reached her best singles ranking of world No. 179. On 20 May 2019, she peaked at No. 153 in the doubles rankings.

During her career, Dinu won 25 singles titles and 32 doubles titles on the ITF Women's Circuit.

== Career ==
=== Juniors ===
She was ranked world's 11th female junior player in May 2010 and was part of the main singles and doubles draws for the last five Grand Slam tournaments: 2009 US Open, 2010 Australian Open, 2010 French Open, 2010 Wimbledon Championships, 2010 US Open and competed at the 2010 Summer Youth Olympics also.

=== Professional ===
In July 2015, Dinu entered the Bucharest Open, and won the three consecutive qualifying rounds matches (defeating top seed Yaroslava Shvedova in the last round), eventually losing in the main draw to Denisa Allertova, in a thrilling match.

In 2022, Cristina Dinu joined the Sportsin Arad Club.

== Grand Slam performance timeline ==
Key
W	F	SF	QF	#R	RR	Q#	DNQ	A	NH

(W) winner; (F) finalist; (SF) semifinalist; (QF) quarterfinalist; (#R) rounds 4, 3, 2, 1; (RR) round-robin stage; (Q#) qualification round; (DNQ) did not qualify; (A) absent; (NH) not held; (SR) strike rate (events won / competed); (W–L) win–loss record.
To avoid confusion and double counting, these charts are updated at the conclusion of a tournament or when the player's participation has ended.

=== Singles ===
Tournament	2013	...	2022	2023	2024	2025	SR	W–L
Australian Open	A		Q1	A	A	A	0 / 0	0–0
French Open	A		A	A	Q3	A	0 / 0	0–0
Wimbledon	A		Q1	A	A	A	0 / 0	0–0
US Open	Q1		A	A	A	A	0 / 0	0–0
Win–Loss	0–0		0–0	0–0	0–0	0–0	0 / 0	0–0

== ITF Circuit finals ==
=== Singles: 39 (25 titles, 14 runner-ups) ===
Legend W25/35 tournaments W10/15 tournaments	Finals by surface Hard (2–0) Clay (23–14)

Result	W–L	Date	Tournament	Tier	Surface	Opponent	Score
Win	1–0	Oct 2009	ITF Antalya, Turkey	10k	Clay	(Belarus) Anna Orlik	6–4, 6–3
Win	2–0	Oct 2010	ITF Antalya, Turkey	10k	Clay	(Poland) Barbara Sobaszkiewicz	6–3, 6–3
Win	3–0	Oct 2010	ITF Antalya, Turkey	10k	Clay	(Russia) Polina Vinogradova	6–2, 6–2
Loss	3–1	Dec 2010	ITF Vinaròs, Spain	10k	Clay	(Spain) Lara Arruabarrena	2–6, 0–6
Win	4–1	Mar 2011	ITF Antalya, Turkey	10k	Clay	(Romania) Diana Enache	6–2, 6–3
Win	5–1	Mar 2011	ITF Antalya, Turkey	10k	Clay	(Hungary) Réka Luca Jani	6–3, 6–4
Loss	5–2	Apr 2011	ITF Pomezia, Italy	10k	Clay	(Italy) Anna-Giulia Remondina	7–5, 2–6, 3–6
Win	6–2	Aug 2011	ITF Bucharest, Romania	10k	Clay	(Romania) Andreea Mitu	7–6^{(5)}, 6–4
Win	7–2	Jan 2012	ITF Antalya, Turkey	10k	Clay	(Romania) Liana Ungur	7–5, 6–3
Win	8–2	Feb 2012	ITF Antalya, Turkey	10k	Clay	(Romania) Diana Enache	6–1, 6–1
Win	9–2	Oct 2012	Lagos Open, Nigeria	25k	Hard	(South Africa) Chanel Simmonds	7–5, 4–6, 6–4
Win	10–2	Oct 2012	Lagos Open, Nigeria	25k	Hard	(Switzerland) Conny Perrin	6–3, 6–3
Win	11–2	Mar 2013	ITF Antalya, Turkey	10k	Clay	(Slovakia) Lenka Juríková	6–4, 7–6
Win	12–2	Aug 2013	ITF Mamaia, Romania	25k	Clay	(Netherlands) Cindy Burger	6–7^{(5)}, 7–5, 6–0
Loss	12–3	Sep 2013	ITF Dobrich, Bulgaria	25k	Clay	(Austria) Patricia Mayr-Achleitner	1–6, 2–6
Loss	12–4	Jun 2014	ITF Bucharest, Romania	10k	Clay	(Romania) Cristina Ene	4–6, 3–6
Win	13–4	Mar 2015	ITF Antalya, Turkey	10k	Clay	(Hungary) Réka Luca Jani	2–6, 6–4, 6–2
Loss	13–5	Jun 2015	ITF Galați, Romania	25k	Clay	(Romania) Alexandra Cadanțu	4–6, 7–6^{(2)}, 3–6
Loss	13–6	Aug 2015	ITF Bad Saulgau, Germany	25k	Clay	(Switzerland) Romina Oprandi	3–6, 3−6
Loss	13–7	Aug 2015	ITF Mamaia, Romania	25k	Clay	(Romania) Ana Bogdan	7–6^{(5)}, 2–6, 3–6
Win	14–7	Jan 2017	ITF Hammamet, Tunisia	15k	Clay	(Germany) Katharina Gerlach	6–2, 6–1
Win	15–7	Feb 2017	ITF Antalya, Turkey	15k	Clay	(Serbia) Dejana Radanović	6–3, 6–3
Win	16–7	Jul 2017	ITF Bucharest, Romania	15k	Clay	(Romania) Georgia Crăciun	6–3, 6–3
Loss	16–8	Sep 2017	ITF Mamaia, Romania	25k	Clay	(Romania) Jaqueline Cristian	2–6, 6–2, 3–6
Loss	16–9	Nov 2017	ITF Santa Margherita di Pula, Italy	25k	Clay	(Slovenia) Polona Hercog	1–6, 4–6
Win	17–9	Dec 2017	ITF Antalya, Turkey	15k	Clay	(Croatia) Tena Lukas	6–3, 6–3
Win	18–9	Mar 2021	ITF Antalya, Turkey	W15	Clay	(Japan) Mai Hontama	6–2, 6–3
Win	19–9	May 2021	ITF Antalya, Turkey	W15	Clay	(Brazil) Gabriela Cé	6–3, 6–0
Win	20–9	May 2021	ITF Antalya, Turkey	W15	Clay	(South Africa) Zoë Kruger	6–3, 6–4
Win	21–9	Jul 2021	ITF Tarvisio, Italy	W25	Clay	(Brazil) Gabriela Cé	6–2, 6–0
Win	22–9	Aug 2021	Vrnjačka Banja Open, Serbia	W25	Clay	(Czech Republic) Anna Sisková	6–1, 7–5
Win	23–9	Sep 2021	ITF Vienna, Austria	W25	Clay	(Austria) Sinja Kraus	6–3, 6–4
Loss	23–10	Aug 2022	Vrnjačka Banja Open, Serbia	W25	Clay	(Serbia) Mia Ristić	6–0, 5–7, 5–7
Loss	23–11	Jun 2023	ITF Kursumlijska Banja, Serbia	W25	Clay	(Greece) Dimitra Pavlou	3–6, 6–2, 4–6
Loss	23–12	Nov 2023	ITF Heraklion, Greece	W25	Clay	(Spain) Ane Mintegi del Olmo	2–6, 3–6
Win	24–12	Jan 2024	ITF Antalya, Turkey	W35	Clay	(Ukraine) Anastasiya Soboleva	6–3, 1–0 ret.
Win	25–12	Feb 2024	ITF Antalya, Turkey	W35	Clay	(Canada) Carson Branstine	6–3, 3–0 ret.
Loss	25–13	Jul 2024	ITF Stuttgart-Vaihingen, Germany	W35	Clay	(Germany) Ella Seidel	4–6, 3–6
Loss	25–14	Oct 2024	ITF Heraklion, Greece	W35	Clay	Ekaterina Makarova	6–4, 3–6, 3–6

=== Doubles: 59 (32 titles, 27 runner-ups) ===
Legend W50/60/75 tournaments W40 tournaments W25/35 tournaments W10/15 tournaments	Finals by surface Hard (2–4) Clay (30–23)

Result	W–L	Date	Tournament	Tier	Surface	Partner	Opponents	Score
Win	1–0	Oct 2010	ITF Antalya, Turkey	10,000	Clay	(Romania) Ionela-Andreea Iova	(Uzbekistan) Vlada Ekshibarova (Poland) Barbara Sobaszkiewicz	1–6, 6–2, [10–7]
Loss	1–1	Dec 2010	ITF Vinaròs, Spain	10,000	Clay	(Romania) Ionela-Andreea Iova	(Spain) Arabela Fernández-Rebener (Russia) Anna Arina Marenko	6–7^{(4)}, 5–7
Win	2–1	Apr 2011	ITF Antalya, Turkey	10,000	Clay	(Italy) Andreea Văideanu	(Czech Republic) Kristýna Hančarová (Czech Republic) Nikola Horáková	6–3, 6–2
Win	3–1	Aug 2011	ITF Bucharest, Romania	10,000	Clay	(Romania) Camelia Hristea	(Romania) Alexandra Damaschin (Romania) Cristina Mitu	1–6, 7–6^{(6)}, [10–4]
Loss	3–2	Oct 2011	ITF Dobrich, Bulgaria	25,000	Clay	(Romania) Laura Ioana Andrei	(Romania) Diana Marcu (Romania) Cristina Mitu	6–4, 3–6, [6–10]
Win	4–2	Jan 2012	ITF Antalya, Turkey	10,000	Clay	(Romania) Cristina Mitu	(Romania) Diana Marcu (Romania) Liana Ungur	7–6^{(3)}, 6–2
Win	5–2	Jan 2012	ITF Antalya, Turkey	10,000	Clay	(Romania) Cristina Mitu	(Japan) Yumi Nakano (Russia) Ekaterina Yashina	w/o
Win	6–2	Mar 2012	ITF Antalya, Turkey	10,000	Clay	(Romania) Diana Buzean	(Russia) Angelina Gabueva (Russia) Margarita Lazareva	6–0, 5–7, [10–3]
Loss	6–3	May 2013	ITF Caserta, Italy	25,000	Clay	(Romania) Elena Bogdan	(Montenegro) Danka Kovinić (Czech Republic) Renata Voráčová	4–6, 6–7^{(7)}
Loss	6–4	Jun 2013	ITF Padova, Italy	25,000	Clay	(Slovenia) Maša Zec Peškirič	(Poland) Paula Kania (Russia) Irina Khromacheva	3–6, 1–6
Loss	6–5	Oct 2013	Lagos Open, Nigeria	25,000	Hard	(Oman) Fatma Al-Nabhani	(United Kingdom) Naomi Broady (United Kingdom) Emily Webley-Smith	6–3, 4–6, [7–10]
Win	7–5	Jun 2015	ITF Galați, Romania	25,000	Clay	(North Macedonia) Lina Gjorcheska	(Romania) Irina Bara (Romania) Diana Buzean	6–4, 6–2
Win	8–5	Aug 2015	ITF Bad Saulgau, Germany	25,000	Clay	(Romania) Diana Buzean	(Greece) Despina Papamichail (Greece) Maria Sakkari	2–6, 6–3, [10–8]
Win	9–5	Aug 2015	ITF Bucharest, Romania	10,000	Clay	(Romania) Diana Buzean	(Romania) Elena-Gabriela Ruse (Romania) Oana Georgeta Simion	6–0, 6–2
Win	10–5	Oct 2015	Open de Touraine, France	50,000	Hard (i)	(Romania) Alexandra Cadanțu	(Switzerland) Viktorija Golubic (Italy) Alice Matteucci	7–5, 6–3
Loss	10–6	Oct 2015	ITF Istanbul, Turkey	25,000	Hard (i)	(Croatia) Jana Fett	(Turkey) Başak Eraydın (Russia) Polina Leykina	5–7, 7–6^{(2)}, [5–10]
Win	11–6	Jan 2016	ITF Bertioga, Brazil	25,000	Hard	(Netherlands) Indy de Vroome	(Poland) Katarzyna Kawa (Poland) Sandra Zaniewska	6–3, 6–3
Loss	11–7	Jun 2016	ITF Padua, Italy	25,000	Clay	(North Macedonia) Lina Gjorcheska	(Poland) Katarzyna Piter (Italy) Alice Matteucci	6–2, 6–7^{(1)}, [8–10]
Win	12–7	Jun 2016	Szeged Women's Open, Hungary	50,000	Clay	(North Macedonia) Lina Gjorcheska	(Poland) Justyna Jegiołka (Argentina) Guadalupe Pérez Rojas	4–6, 6–1, [10–4]
Loss	12–8	Jan 2017	ITF Hammamet, Tunisia	15,000	Clay	(Russia) Yana Sizikova	(Brazil) Laura Pigossi (Spain) María Teresa Torró Flor	2–6, 4–6
Loss	12–9	Jan 2017	ITF Antalya, Turkey	15,000	Clay	(Romania) Cristina Ene	(Turkey) Başak Eraydın (Switzerland) Karin Kennel	3–6, 6–2, [5–10]
Loss	12–10	Aug 2017	ITF Bad Saulgau, Germany	25,000	Clay	(Romania) Nicoleta Dascălu	(Russia) Anna Kalinskaya (Turkey) İpek Soylu	2–6, 2–6
Win	13–10	Oct 2017	ITF Santa Margherita di Pula, Italy	25,000	Clay	(Italy) Camilla Rosatello	(Romania) Elena Bogdan (Bosnia and Herzegovina) Anita Husarić	6–2, 6–1
Win	14–10	Dec 2017	ITF Antalya, Turkey	15,000	Clay	(Finland) Mia Eklund	(Bulgaria) Dia Evtimova (Argentina) Paula Ormaechea	6–3, 6–2
Win	15–10	Jun 2018	ITF Brescia, Italy	60,000	Clay	(Ukraine) Ganna Poznikhirenko	(Russia) Alexandra Panova (Russia) Anastasia Pribylova	6–3, 7–6^{(6)}
Win	16–10	Aug 2018	ITF Leipzig, Germany	25,000	Clay	(Ukraine) Ganna Poznikhirenko	(Czech Republic) Petra Krejsová (Czech Republic) Jesika Malečková	4–6, 6–0, [10–5]
Win	17–10	Sep 2018	ITF Dobrich, Bulgaria	25,000	Clay	(Venezuela) Aymet Uzcátegui	(Romania) Elena-Gabriela Ruse (Romania) Jaqueline Cristian	7–6^{(3)}, 6–2
Win	18–10	Oct 2018	ITF Santa Margherita di Pula, Italy	25,000	Clay	(Hungary) Réka Luca Jani	(Italy) Giorgia Marchetti (Italy) Camilla Rosatello	3–6, 6–1, [13–11]
Loss	18–11	Oct 2018	ITF Santa Margherita di Pula, Italy	25,000	Clay	(Croatia) Lea Bošković	(Italy) Martina Colmegna (Italy) Federica di Sarra	4–6, 6–7^{(1)}
Loss	18–12	Oct 2018	ITF Santa Margherita di Pula, Italy	25,000	Clay	(Italy) Camilla Rosatello	(Russia) Valentina Ivakhnenko (Czech Republic) Anastasia Zarycká	2–6, 4–6
Win	19–12	Nov 2018	ITF Santa Margherita di Pula, Italy	25,000	Clay	(Romania) Andreea Mitu	(Italy) Federica di Sarra (Italy) Anastasia Grymalska	w/o
Loss	19–13	Feb 2019	ITF Antalya, Turkey	W15	Clay	(Romania) Irina Fetecău	(Italy) Gaia Sanesi (Italy) Camilla Scala	7–6^{(4)}, 4–6, [8–10]
Loss	19–14	Mar 2019	ITF Antalya, Turkey	W15	Clay	(North Macedonia) Lina Gjorcheska	(Russia) Daria Mishina (Kyrgyzstan) Ksenia Palkina	3–6, 6–3, [10–12]
Loss	19–15	Mar 2019	ITF Santa Margherita di Pula, Italy	W25	Clay	(Hungary) Réka Luca Jani	(Russia) Alena Fomina (Russia) Valentina Ivakhnenko	5–7, 6–3, [8–10]
Loss	19–16	Jun 2019	Grado Tennis Cup, Italy	W25	Clay	(Uzbekistan) Akgul Amanmuradova	(Kazakhstan) Anna Danilina (Hungary) Réka Luca Jani	2–6, 3–6
Loss	19–17	May 2019	ITF Rome, Italy	W25	Clay	(Brazil) Gabriela Cé	(Australia) Arina Rodionova (Australia) Storm Sanders	2–6, 3–6
Win	20–17	Jun 2019	ITF Padova, Italy	W25	Clay	(Italy) Angelica Moratelli	(Brazil) Carolina Alves (Brazil) Gabriela Cé	7–6^{(7)}, 3–6, [10–8]
Win	21–17	Aug 2019	Ladies Open Hechingen, Germany	W60	Clay	(North Macedonia) Lina Gjorcheska	(Serbia) Olga Danilović (Spain) Georgina García Pérez	4–6, 7–5, [10–7]
Win	22–17	Sep 2019	ITF Trieste, Italy	W25	Clay	(Italy) Angelica Moratelli	(Hungary) Dalma Gálfi (Greece) Valentini Grammatikopoulou	4–6, 6–1, [10–8]
Win	23–17	Sep 2020	ITF Varna, Bulgaria	W15	Clay	(Romania) Ioana Loredana Roșca	(Romania) Oana Gavrilă (Romania) Andreea Roșca	6–4, 3–6, [10–7]
Loss	23–18	Dec 2020	ITF Antalya, Turkiye	W15	Clay	(Ukraine) Viktoriia Dema	(Romania) Andreea Prisăcariu (Romania) Andreea Roșca	6–3, 4–6, [6–10]
Win	24–18	Feb 2021	ITF Antalya, Turkiye	W15	Clay	(Slovakia) Chantal Škamlová	(Colombia) María Herazo González (Colombia) Yuliana Lizarazo	6–1, 6–3
Win	25–18	May 2021	ITF Antalya, Turkiye	W15	Clay	(Brazil) Gabriela Cé	(Germany) Katharina Hering (Germany) Natalia Siedliska	7–5, 6–1
Win	26–18	Aug 2021	ITF Pescara, Italy	W25	Clay	(Romania) Ioana Loredana Roșca	(Argentina) Victoria Bosio (Italy) Angelica Moratelli	6–2, 5–7, [10–3]
Loss	26–19	Aug 2022	ITF Brașov, Romania	W25	Clay	(Romania) Andreea Roșca	(Romania) Ilona Georgiana Ghioroaie (Romania) Oana Georgeta Simion	5–7, 3–6
Win	27–19	Aug 2022	Vrnjačka Banja Open, Serbia	W25	Clay	(Ukraine) Valeriya Strakhova	(United Kingdom) Emily Appleton (India) Prarthana Thombare	6–1, 4–6, [10–8]
Loss	27–20	Sep 2022	Vrnjačka Banja Open 2	W60	Clay	(Slovenia) Nika Radišić	Darya Astakhova; Ekaterina Reyngold	6–3, 2–6, [8–10]
Loss	27–21	Oct 2022	ITF Sozopol, Bulgaria	W25	Hard	(China) Lu Jiajing	(China) Ma Yexin (Chinese Taipei) Yang Ya-yi	3–6, 1–6
Loss	27–22	Oct 2022	ITF Istanbul, Turkiye	W25	Hard (i)	(Georgia (country)) Sofia Shapatava	Ekaterina Yashina (Netherlands) Jasmijn Gimbrère	1–6, 6–3, [11–13]
Win	28–22	Feb 2023	ITF Antalya, Turkiye	W25	Clay	(Slovenia) Nika Radišić	(Egypt) Sandra Samir (Hong Kong) Cody Wong	7–5, 6–2
Win	29–22	Jul 2023	ITF Kuršumlijska Banja, Serbia	W25	Clay	(Ukraine) Valeriya Strakhova	Polina Leykina (Bulgaria) Julia Stamatova	4–6, 6–2, [10–8]
Win	30–22	Sep 2023	ITF Pazardzhik, Bulgaria	W40	Clay	(Slovakia) Radka Zelníčková	(Latvia) Daniela Vismane (Bulgaria) Gergana Topalova	1–6, 7–5, [10–6]
Loss	30–23	Oct 2023	ITF Seville, Spain	W25	Clay	(Greece) Sapfo Sakellaridi	(Ukraine) Maryna Kolb (Ukraine) Nadiia Kolb	1–6, 1–6
Win	31–23	Jan 2024	ITF Antalya, Turkiye	W35	Clay	(Slovenia) Nika Radišić	Amina Anshba (Ukraine) Valeriya Strakhova	6–2, 3–6, [13–11]
Loss	31–24	Feb 2024	ITF Antalya, Turkiye	W35	Clay	(Ukraine) Oleksandra Oliynykova	(Spain) Ángela Fita Boluda (Latvia) Daniela Vismane	4–6, 0–6
Loss	31–25	Mar 2024	ITF Larnaca, Cyprus	W35	Clay	(Malta) Francesca Curmi	(Croatia) Tena Lukas (France) Kristina Mladenovic	4–6, 5–7
Win	32–25	Jul 2024	ITF Stuttgart-Vaihingen, Germany	W35	Clay	(Slovenia) Nika Radišić	(Netherlands) Jasmijn Gimbrère (Netherlands) Stéphanie Visscher	3–6, 6–4, [10–4]
Loss	32–26	Sep 2024	Serbian Tennis Tour, Serbia	W75	Clay	(Bulgaria) Lia Karatancheva	Amina Anshba (Germany) Noma Noha Akugue	2–6, 6–7^{(2)}
Loss	32–27	Mar 2025	ITF Antalya, Turkiye	W35	Clay	(Romania) Ilinca Amariei	(United States) Makenna Jones (Bulgaria) Lia Karatancheva	2–6, 2–6
