= Joué-lès-Tours =

- Commune
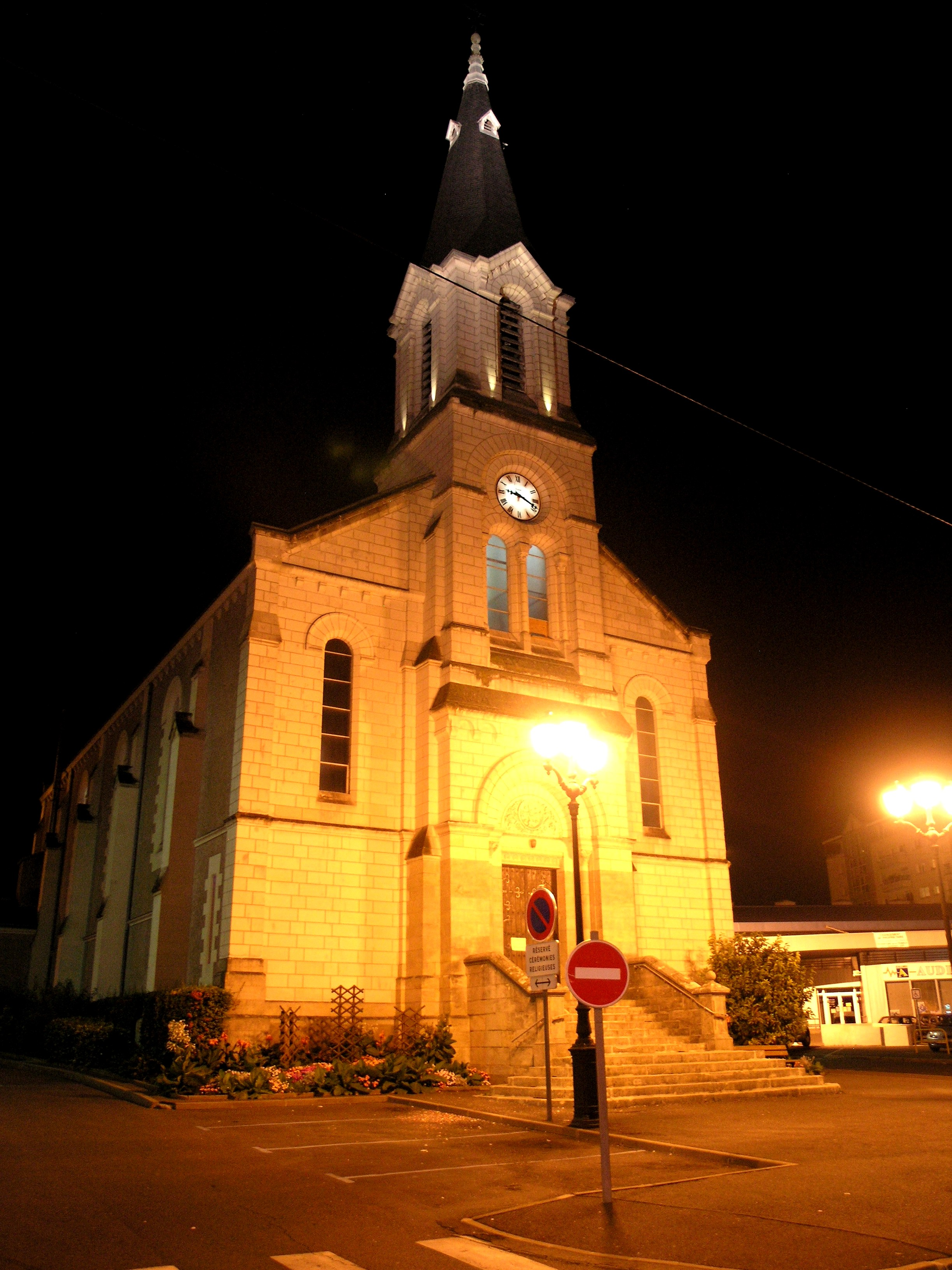
- The church in Joué-lès-Tours

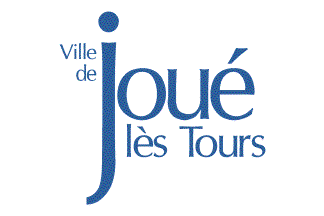
- Flag Coat of arms
- Location of Joué-lès-Tours
- Location within France Location within Centre-Val de Loire
- Coordinates: 47°21′05″N 0°39′45″E
- Country: France
- Region: Centre-Val de Loire
- Department: Indre-et-Loire
- Arrondissement: Tours
- Canton: Joué-lès-Tours
- Intercommunality: Tours Métropole Val de Loire

Government
  - Mayor (2020–2026): Frédéric Augis
- Area^{1}: 33.41 km^{2} (12.90 sq mi)
- Highest elevation: 96 m (315 ft)
- Lowest elevation: 44 m (144 ft)
- Population (2023): 38,423
  - Density: 1,150/km^{2} (2,979/sq mi)
- Demonym(s): Jocondien, Jocondienne
- Time zone: UTC+01:00 (CET)
  - Summer (DST): UTC+02:00 (CEST)
- INSEE/Postal code: 37122 /37300
- ^{1} French Land Register data, which excludes lakes, ponds, glaciers > 1 km^{2} (0.386 sq mi or 247 acres) and river estuaries.

Joué-lès-Tours (French pronunciation: [ʒwe lɛ tuʁ], literally Joué near Tours) is a commune in the department of Indre-et-Loire, Centre-Val de Loire, central France.

It is the largest suburb of the city of Tours, and is adjacent to it on the southwest.

== Population ==
Historical population

Year	Pop.	±% p.a.
1793	1,515	—
1800	1,777	+2.30%
1806	1,671	−1.02%
1821	1,700	+0.11%
1831	1,776	+0.44%
1836	1,769	−0.08%
1841	1,791	+0.25%
1846	1,780	−0.12%
1851	1,802	+0.25%
1856	1,845	+0.47%
1861	2,010	+1.73%
1866	2,043	+0.33%
1872	2,106	+0.51%
1876	2,302	+2.25%
1881	2,381	+0.68%
1886	2,470	+0.74%
1891	2,538	+0.54%
1896	2,462	−0.61%
1901	2,466	+0.03%

Year	Pop.	±% p.a.
1906	2,595	+1.02%
1911	2,730	+1.02%
1921	3,143	+1.42%
1926	3,440	+1.82%
1931	4,163	+3.89%
1936	4,704	+2.47%
1946	5,684	+1.91%
1954	6,446	+1.58%
1962	9,074	+4.37%
1968	17,826	+11.91%
1975	27,450	+6.36%
1982	34,704	+3.41%
1990	36,798	+0.74%
1999	36,517	−0.09%
2007	35,836	−0.24%
2012	37,196	+0.75%
2017	37,893	+0.37%
2023	38,423	+0.23%

Source: EHESS and INSEE (1968-2023)

== Toponymy ==
The name of Joué-lès-Tours appears in its form "Gaudiacus" in the 6th Century. It corresponds to a toponymic type frequently found in Christian Gaule, that gave different variants depending on the region: Joué (west of France), Jouy (center and north), Jouey (east), Gouy (Normandy/Picardy), Gaugeac, Jaujac (south). It is composed of the Christian name "Gaudius", meaning "fortunate", "blessed" (gaudia > joy, in Latin) and with the Gallo-Roman suffix -ACU, meaning "place of", "property of".

== History ==
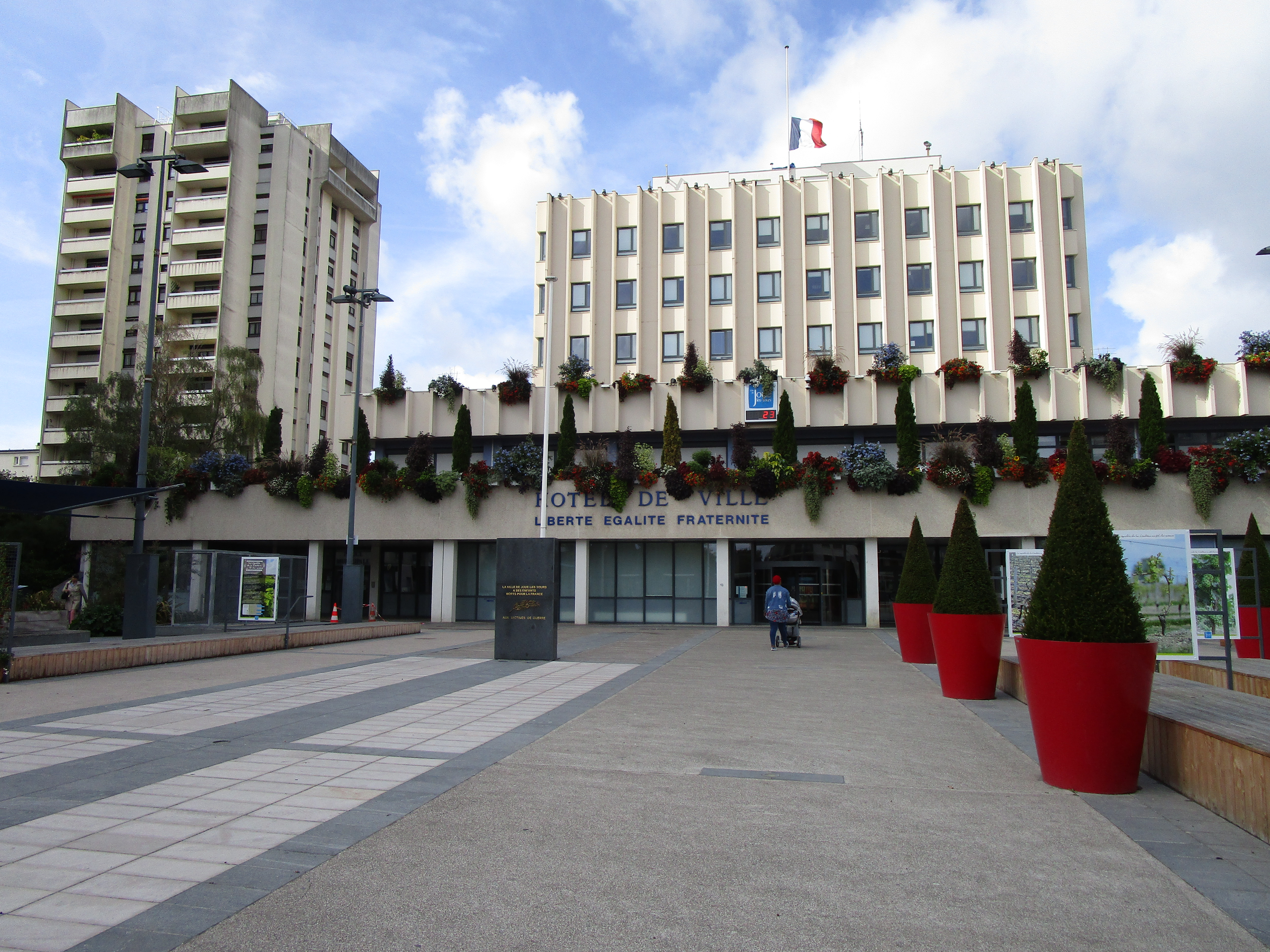
The Hôtel de Ville

The Hôtel de Ville was completed in 1976. Joué-lès-Tours was the site of the 20 December 2014 Tours police station stabbing.

== Controversy ==
In February 2010 the mayor, Philippe Le Breton, added the word laïcité underneath the French national motto on the town hall's façade.

== See also ==
- Communes of the Indre-et-Loire department
- 2014 Tours police station stabbing
