= Ana Vrljić =

Croatian tennis player (born 1984)

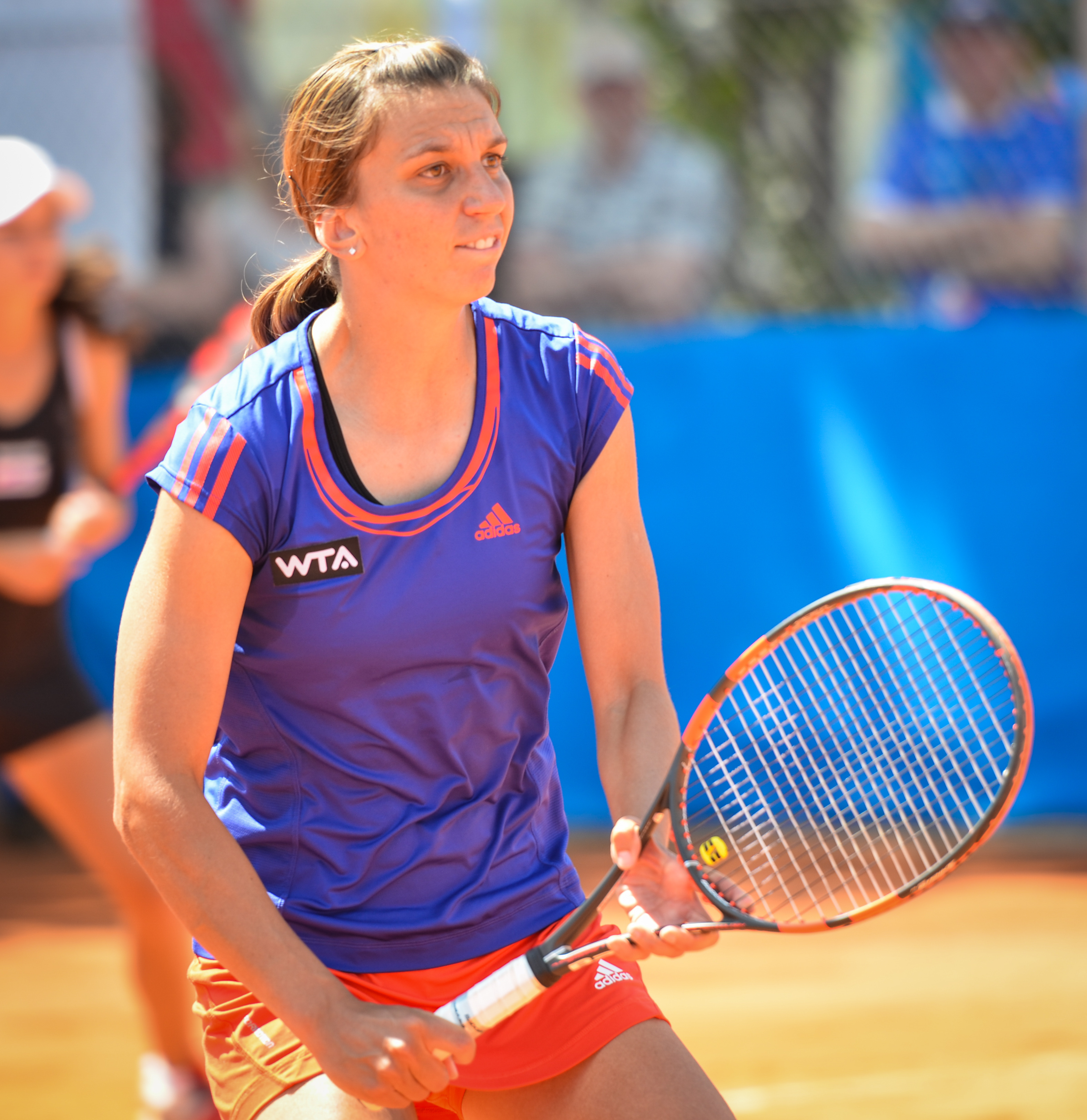
- Country (sports): Croatia
- Born: 1 August 1984 (age 41) Zagreb, SR Croatia, Yugoslavia
- Turned pro: 2000
- Retired: 2019
- Plays: Right-handed (one-handed backhand)
- Prize money: $293,378

Singles
- Career record: 495–386
- Career titles: 4 ITF
- Highest ranking: No. 180 (26 August 2013)

Grand Slam singles results
- Australian Open: Q2 (2014)
- French Open: Q1 (2013)
- Wimbledon: Q1 (2007, 2011, 2013)
- US Open: Q2 (2006)

Doubles
- Career record: 169–147
- Career titles: 11 ITF
- Highest ranking: No. 149 (13 January 2013)

Team competitions
- Fed Cup: 4-3
Medal record
Women's tennis
Representing Croatia
Mediterranean Games
Silver medal – second place	2005 Almería	Doubles
- Last updated on: 3 September 2021.

Ana Vrljić (Croatian pronunciation: [âna ʋr̩̂ːʎitɕ, ǎː-]; born 1 August 1984) is a retired Croatia tennis player.

Vrljić has won four singles and eleven doubles titles on the ITF Women's Circuit. On 24 June 2013, she reached her highest singles ranking of world No. 180. On 26 August 2013, she peaked at No. 149 in the doubles rankings.

Playing for Croatia Fed Cup team, Vrljić has a win–loss record of 4–3.

== Tennis career ==
She started playing tennis at the age of four, her favorite surface is hardcourt. At the Mediterranean Games, she won the silver medal in women's doubles along with Matea Mezak.

Vrljić made it to the quarterfinals of the 2010 Swedish Open, defeating Angelique Kerber and Arantxa Rus but she lost to Gisela Dulko.

== ITF finals ==
=== Singles: 16 (4–12) ===
Legend $100,000 tournaments $75,000 tournaments $50,000 tournaments $25,000 tournaments $10,000 tournaments	Finals by surface Hard (3–10) Clay (0–2) Grass (0–0) Carpet (1–0)

Outcome	No.	Date	Tournament	Surface	Opponent	Score
Winner	1.	23 February 2003	ITF Buchen, Germany	Carpet (i)	(Germany) Sabrina Jolk	6–3, 7–6^{(7)}
Runner-up	1.	5 February 2006	Jersey, Great Britain	Hard (i)	(United Kingdom) Anne Keothavong	2–6, 1–6
Runner-up	2.	11 June 2006	Grado, Italy	Clay	(Croatia) Sanja Ančić	4–6, 6–3, 4–6
Runner-up	3.	11 November 2006	Opole, Poland	Hard (i)	(Ukraine) Yuliya Beygelzimer	2–6, 0–6
Runner-up	4.	12 August 2007	Hechingen Open, Germany	Clay	(Ukraine) Oxana Lyubtsova	3–6, 2–6
Runner-up	5.	30 March 2008	Jersey, Great Britain	Hard (i)	(United Kingdom) Elena Baltacha	1–6, 3–6
Runner-up	6.	6 April 2008	Hamburg, Germany	Hard (i)	(Germany) Kristina Barrois	2–6, ret.
Runner-up	7.	23 November 2008	Opole, Poland	Hard (i)	(Netherlands) Arantxa Rus	6–4, 5–7, 3–6
Winner	2.	13 November 2011	Opole, Poland	Hard (i)	(Poland) Paula Kania	6–3, 2–6, 7–6^{(7)}
Runner-up	8.	18 November 2012	Opole, Poland	Hard (i)	(Czech Republic) Karolína Plíšková	3–6, 2–6
Runner-up	9.	27 January 2013	Andrézieux-Bouthéon, France	Hard (i)	(Belgium) Alison Van Uytvanck	1–6, 4–6
Winner	3.	10 August 2013	Izmir, Turkey	Hard	(Poland) Katarzyna Piter	6–1, 6–3
Runner-up	10.	5 October 2014	Monterrey, Mexico	Hard	(Ukraine) Kateryna Bondarenko	1–6, 5–7
Winner	4.	15 November 2014	Minsk, Belarus	Hard (i)	(Russia) Ekaterina Alexandrova	3–6, 6–4, 7–6^{(7)}
Runner-up	11.	15 November 2015	GB Pro-Series Bath, UK	Hard (i)	(Romania) Ana Bogdan	3–6, 6–4, 1–6
Runner-up	12.	6 November 2016	ITF Sharm El Sheikh, Egypt	Hard	(Austria) Melanie Klaffner	5–7, 3–6

=== Doubles: 21 (11–10) ===
Legend $100,000 tournaments $75,000 tournaments $50,000 tournaments $25,000 tournaments $15,000 tournaments $10,000 tournaments	Finals by surface Hard (5–6) Clay (5–4) Grass (0–0) Carpet (1–0)

Outcome	No.	Date	Tournament	Surface	Partner	Opponents	Score
Winner	1.	9 February 2003	ITF Bergamo, Italy	Hard (i)	(Croatia) Darija Jurak	(Austria) Stefanie Haidner (Austria) Bianca Kamper	6–4, 6–4
Winner	2.	7 July 2003	Darmstadt, Germany	Clay	(Croatia) Sanda Mamić	(Serbia and Montenegro) Daniela Berček (Russia) Maria Goloviznina	7–6^{(7)}, 6–1
Winner	3.	4 September 2009	Maribor, Slovenia	Clay	(Croatia) Ani Mijačika	(Croatia) Maria Abramović (Slovakia) Katarína Kachlíková	6–2, 6–3
Runner-up	1.	17 September 2010	Zagreb, Croatia	Clay	(Croatia) Ani Mijačika	(Argentina) Mailen Auroux (Serbia) Nataša Zorić	5–7, 7–5, [12–14]
Runner-up	2.	14 May 2011	Zagreb, Croatia	Clay	(Croatia) Ani Mijačika	(Bulgaria) Elitsa Kostova (Poland) Barbara Sobaszkiewicz	6–1, 3–6, [10–12]
Runner-up	3.	4 June 2011	Maribor, Slovenia	Clay	(Croatia) Ani Mijačika	(Colombia) Karen Castiblanco (Venezuela) Adriana Pérez	3–6, 6–7^{(9)}
Winner	4.	29 August 2011	Sarajevo, Bosnia-Herzegovina	Clay	(Croatia) Maria Abramović	(Portugal) Maria Joao Koehler (Argentina) Florencia Molinero	5–7, 7–6^{(7)}, 6–2
Runner-up	4.	31 October 2011	Istanbul, Turkey	Hard	(Bosnia and Herzegovina) Mervana Jugić-Salkić	(Ukraine) Lyudmyla Kichenok (Ukraine) Nadiia Kichenok	6–4, 1–6, [7–10]
Winner	5.	18 June 2012	Lenzerheide, Switzerland	Clay	(Serbia) Aleksandra Krunić	(Russia) Ksenia Lykina (Bulgaria) Isabella Shinikova	6–2, 6–4
Runner-up	5.	5 November 2012	Équeurdreville, France	Hard (i)	(Switzerland) Amra Sadiković	(Poland) Magda Linette (Poland) Katarzyna Piter	4–6, 6–7^{(4)}
Winner	6.	21 January 2013	Andrézieux-Bouthéon, France	Hard (i)	(Switzerland) Amra Sadiković	(Russia) Margarita Gasparyan (Ukraine) Olga Savchuk	5–7, 7–5, [10–4]
Winner	7.	12 April 2013	Edgbaston, United Kingdom	Hard (i)	(Germany) Kristina Barrois	(Netherlands) Richèl Hogenkamp (Liechtenstein) Stephanie Vogt	6–4, 7–6^{(2)}
Runner-up	6.	12 July 2013	Biarritz, France	Clay	(Russia) Vera Dushevina	(Ukraine) Olga Savchuk (Ukraine) Yuliya Beygelzimer	6–2, 4–6, [8–10]
Winner	8.	13 October 2013	Joué-lès-Tours, France	Hard (i)	(France) Julie Coin	(Czech Republic) Andrea Hlaváčková (Netherlands) Michaëlla Krajicek	6–3, 4–6, [15–13]
Runner-up	7.	30 January 2015	Andrézieux-Bouthéon, France	Hard (i)	(Netherlands) Lesley Kerkhove	(Italy) Gioia Barbieri (Latvia) Jeļena Ostapenko	6–2, 6–7^{(4)}, [3–10]
Winner	9.	22 February 2015	Altenkirchen, Germany	Carpet (i)	(Germany) Antonia Lottner	(Austria) Sandra Klemenschits (Germany) Tatjana Maria	6–4, 3–6, [11–9]
Runner-up	8.	28 February 2015	Saint Petersburg, Russia	Hard (i)	(France) Stéphanie Foretz	(Switzerland) Viktorija Golubic (Belarus) Aliaksandra Sasnovich	4–6, 5–7
Winner	10.	6 April 2015	Barnstaple, United Kingdom	Hard (i)	(France) Stéphanie Foretz	(United Kingdom) Naomi Broady (Russia) Ekaterina Bychkova	6–2, 5–7, [10–7]
Winner	11.	13 May 2016	Győr, Hungary	Clay	(Hungary) Réka Luca Jani	(Hungary) Vanda Lukács (Slovakia) Chantal Škamlová	6–4, 6–3
Runner-up	9.	25 February 2017	ITF Sharm El Sheikh, Egypt	Clay	(Turkey) Pemra Özgen	(Ukraine) Veronika Kapshay (Bulgaria) Julia Terziyska	3–6, 6–2, [7–10]
Runner-up	10.	4 March 2017	ITF Sharm El Sheikh, Egypt	Clay	(Turkey) Pemra Özgen	(Ukraine) Veronika Kapshay (Germany) Julia Wachaczyk	4–6, 6–2, [5–10]
