= 2016 ITF Women's Circuit (April–June) =

International tennis circuit

The 2016 ITF Women's Circuit is the 2016 edition of the second-tier tour for women's professional tennis. It is organised by the International Tennis Federation and is a tier below the WTA Tour. The ITF Women's Circuit includes tournaments with prize money ranging from $10,000 up to $100,000.

== Key ==
Category
$100,000 tournaments
$75,000 tournaments
$50,000 tournaments
$25,000 tournaments
$10,000 tournaments

== Month ==
=== April ===
Week of	Tournament	Winner	Runners-up	Semifinalists	Quarterfinalists
April 4	Kashiwa, Japan; Hard $25,000; Singles and doubles draws	(South Korea) Jang Su-jeong; 6–4, 1–6, 6–3	(China) Wang Yafan	(Japan) Mayo Hibi (China) Zhang Kailin	(Japan) Makoto Ninomiya (Japan) Riko Sawayanagi (China) Yang Zhaoxuan (Uzbekistan) Sabina Sharipova
April 4	Kashiwa, Japan; Hard $25,000; Singles and doubles draws	(China) Yang Zhaoxuan (China) Zhang Kailin; 7–5, 2–6, [11–9]	(China) You Xiaodi (China) Zhu Lin	(Japan) Mayo Hibi (China) Zhang Kailin	(Japan) Makoto Ninomiya (Japan) Riko Sawayanagi (China) Yang Zhaoxuan (Uzbekistan) Sabina Sharipova
April 4	Changwon, South Korea; Hard $25,000; Singles and doubles draws	(Sweden) Susanne Celik; 6–2, 6–0	(United States) Kristie Ahn	(Belgium) Elise Mertens (Australia) Arina Rodionova	(Thailand) Nicha Lertpitaksinchai (Japan) Shiho Akita (China) Liu Chang (South Korea) Han Na-lae
April 4	Changwon, South Korea; Hard $25,000; Singles and doubles draws	(South Korea) Han Na-lae (South Korea) Yoo Mi; 4–6, 6–3, [10–7]	(China) Lu Jiajing (Belgium) Elise Mertens	(Belgium) Elise Mertens (Australia) Arina Rodionova	(Thailand) Nicha Lertpitaksinchai (Japan) Shiho Akita (China) Liu Chang (South Korea) Han Na-lae
April 4	Jackson, United States; Clay $25,000; Singles and doubles draws	(United States) Grace Min; 1–6, 6–2, 6–4	(Spain) Paula Badosa Gibert	(Australia) Jarmila Wolfe (United States) Robin Anderson	(Italy) Giulia Gatto-Monticone (Netherlands) Indy de Vroome (Ukraine) Olga Ianchuk (Turkey) İpek Soylu
April 4	Jackson, United States; Clay $25,000; Singles and doubles draws	(Canada) Sharon Fichman (Australia) Jarmila Wolfe; 6–2, 6–3	(United States) Yuki Chiang (United States) Lauren Herring	(Australia) Jarmila Wolfe (United States) Robin Anderson	(Italy) Giulia Gatto-Monticone (Netherlands) Indy de Vroome (Ukraine) Olga Ianchuk (Turkey) İpek Soylu
April 4	Qarshi, Uzbekistan; Hard $25,000; Singles and doubles draws	(Slovakia) Rebecca Šramková; 6–1, 6–3	(Serbia) Nina Stojanović	(Russia) Polina Vinogradova (Russia) Olga Doroshina	(Russia) Natela Dzalamidze (Russia) Anastasia Pivovarova (Belarus) Sviatlana Pirazhenka (Russia) Veronika Kudermetova
April 4	Qarshi, Uzbekistan; Hard $25,000; Singles and doubles draws	(Russia) Natela Dzalamidze (Russia) Veronika Kudermetova; 4–6, 6–4, [10–7]	(Russia) Ksenia Lykina (Russia) Polina Monova	(Russia) Polina Vinogradova (Russia) Olga Doroshina	(Russia) Natela Dzalamidze (Russia) Anastasia Pivovarova (Belarus) Sviatlana Pirazhenka (Russia) Veronika Kudermetova
April 4	São José do Rio Preto, Brazil; Clay $10,000; Singles and doubles draws	(Argentina) Paula Ormaechea; 6–4, 6–1	(Brazil) Laura Pigossi	(Argentina) Victoria Bosio (Chile) Fernanda Brito	(Argentina) Nadia Podoroska (Chile) Bárbara Gatica (Argentina) Guadalupe Pérez Rojas (Colombia) María Fernanda Herazo
April 4	São José do Rio Preto, Brazil; Clay $10,000; Singles and doubles draws	(Chile) Fernanda Brito (Argentina) Constanza Vega; 2–6, 6–4, [10–6]	(Brazil) Carolina Alves (Argentina) Julieta Estable	(Argentina) Victoria Bosio (Chile) Fernanda Brito	(Argentina) Nadia Podoroska (Chile) Bárbara Gatica (Argentina) Guadalupe Pérez Rojas (Colombia) María Fernanda Herazo
April 4	Sharm el-Sheikh, Egypt; Hard $10,000; Singles and doubles draws	(United Kingdom) Manisha Foster; 6–4, 7–6^{(7–4)}	(Ukraine) Oleksandra Korashvili	(Russia) Margarita Skryabina (Thailand) Bunyawi Thamchaiwat	(Belarus) Sadafmoh Tolibova (Georgia (country)) Mariam Bolkvadze (France) Estelle Cascino (France) Victoria Muntean
April 4	Sharm el-Sheikh, Egypt; Hard $10,000; Singles and doubles draws	(Ukraine) Oleksandra Korashvili (Russia) Margarita Lazareva; 7–5, 6–3	(Georgia (country)) Mariam Bolkvadze (France) Victoria Muntean	(Russia) Margarita Skryabina (Thailand) Bunyawi Thamchaiwat	(Belarus) Sadafmoh Tolibova (Georgia (country)) Mariam Bolkvadze (France) Estelle Cascino (France) Victoria Muntean
April 4	Heraklion, Greece; Hard $10,000; Singles and doubles draws	(Russia) Victoria Kan; 6–4, 7–5	(Italy) Cristiana Ferrando	(Hungary) Dalma Gálfi (Italy) Deborah Chiesa	(Belgium) Sofie Oyen (France) Sara Cakarevic (Serbia) Bojana Marinković (Bulgaria) Julia Stamatova
April 4	Heraklion, Greece; Hard $10,000; Singles and doubles draws	(Russia) Victoria Kan (Ukraine) Alyona Sotnikova; 6–1, 6–2	(Uzbekistan) Vlada Ekshibarova (Austria) Janina Toljan	(Hungary) Dalma Gálfi (Italy) Deborah Chiesa	(Belgium) Sofie Oyen (France) Sara Cakarevic (Serbia) Bojana Marinković (Bulgaria) Julia Stamatova
April 4	Hammamet, Tunisia; Clay $10,000; Singles and doubles draws	(Romania) Irina Maria Bara; 6–3, 6–3	(Slovenia) Tamara Zidanšek	(Slovenia) Pia Čuk (Greece) Valentini Grammatikopoulou	(France) Joséphine Boualem (France) Mallaurie Noël (Bosnia and Herzegovina) Jelena Simić (Serbia) Milana Spremo
April 4	Hammamet, Tunisia; Clay $10,000; Singles and doubles draws	(France) Alice Bacquié (Romania) Irina Maria Bara; 6–1, 6–0	(Algeria) Inès Ibbou (France) Kélia Le Bihan	(Slovenia) Pia Čuk (Greece) Valentini Grammatikopoulou	(France) Joséphine Boualem (France) Mallaurie Noël (Bosnia and Herzegovina) Jelena Simić (Serbia) Milana Spremo
April 4	Antalya, Turkey; Hard $10,000; Singles and doubles draws	(Bulgaria) Viktoriya Tomova; 7–6^{(7–5)}, 6–2	(Slovakia) Viktória Kužmová	(Spain) Yvonne Cavallé Reimers (United Kingdom) Emily Arbuthnott	(Serbia) Dejana Radanović (Russia) Elena Rybakina (Slovakia) Vivien Juhászová (United Kingdom) Harriet Dart
April 4	Antalya, Turkey; Hard $10,000; Singles and doubles draws	(United Kingdom) Harriet Dart (Bulgaria) Viktoriya Tomova; Walkover	(Armenia) Ani Amiraghyan (Romania) Daiana Negreanu	(Spain) Yvonne Cavallé Reimers (United Kingdom) Emily Arbuthnott	(Serbia) Dejana Radanović (Russia) Elena Rybakina (Slovakia) Vivien Juhászová (United Kingdom) Harriet Dart
April 11	ITF Women's Circuit – Shenzhen; Shenzhen, China; Hard $50,000; Singles – Doubles	(China) Wang Qiang; 6–2, 6–0	(Japan) Mayo Hibi	(China) Zhang Yuxuan (Uzbekistan) Sabina Sharipova	(Japan) Riko Sawayanagi (Japan) Shuko Aoyama (South Korea) Jang Su-jeong (China) Liu Chang
April 11	ITF Women's Circuit – Shenzhen; Shenzhen, China; Hard $50,000; Singles – Doubles	(Japan) Shuko Aoyama (Japan) Makoto Ninomiya; 7–6^{(7–5)}, 6–4	(China) Liang Chen (China) Wang Yafan	(China) Zhang Yuxuan (Uzbekistan) Sabina Sharipova	(Japan) Riko Sawayanagi (Japan) Shuko Aoyama (South Korea) Jang Su-jeong (China) Liu Chang
April 11	Lale Cup; Istanbul, Turkey; Hard $50,000; Singles – Doubles	(Czech Republic) Barbora Štefková; 7–5, 2–6, 6–1	(Russia) Anastasia Pivovarova	(Russia) Viktoria Kamenskaya (North Macedonia) Lina Gjorcheska	(Bulgaria) Isabella Shinikova (Ukraine) Olga Fridman (Romania) Cristina Dinu (Romania) Alexandra Cadanțu
April 11	Lale Cup; Istanbul, Turkey; Hard $50,000; Singles – Doubles	(Uzbekistan) Nigina Abduraimova (Czech Republic) Barbora Štefková; 6–4, 1–6, [10–6]	(Russia) Valentyna Ivakhnenko (Belarus) Lidziya Marozava	(Russia) Viktoria Kamenskaya (North Macedonia) Lina Gjorcheska	(Bulgaria) Isabella Shinikova (Ukraine) Olga Fridman (Romania) Cristina Dinu (Romania) Alexandra Cadanțu
April 11	Pelham, United States; Clay $25,000; Singles and doubles draws	(United States) Grace Min; 6–4, 6–4	(United States) Bernarda Pera	(United States) Lauren Albanese (United States) Taylor Townsend	(Russia) Alla Kudryavtseva (United States) Asia Muhammad (United States) Melanie Oudin (Ukraine) Olga Ianchuk
April 11	Pelham, United States; Clay $25,000; Singles and doubles draws	(United States) Asia Muhammad (United States) Taylor Townsend; 6–2, 6–3	(United States) Sophie Chang (United States) Caitlin Whoriskey	(United States) Lauren Albanese (United States) Taylor Townsend	(Russia) Alla Kudryavtseva (United States) Asia Muhammad (United States) Melanie Oudin (Ukraine) Olga Ianchuk
April 11	Lins, Brazil; Clay $10,000; Singles and doubles draws	(Argentina) Paula Ormaechea; 6–3, 6–2	(France) Harmony Tan	(Argentina) Constanza Vega (Argentina) Julieta Estable	(Chile) Bárbara Gatica (Argentina) Daniela Farfán (Brazil) Nathaly Kurata (Argentina) Francesca Rescaldani
April 11	Lins, Brazil; Clay $10,000; Singles and doubles draws	(Chile) Bárbara Gatica (Argentina) Stephanie Mariel Petit; 7–5, 6–3	(Argentina) Paula Ormaechea (Argentina) Constanza Vega	(Argentina) Constanza Vega (Argentina) Julieta Estable	(Chile) Bárbara Gatica (Argentina) Daniela Farfán (Brazil) Nathaly Kurata (Argentina) Francesca Rescaldani
April 11	Sharm el-Sheikh, Egypt; Hard $10,000; Singles and doubles draws	(France) Estelle Cascino; 6–2, 5–7, 6–3	(Russia) Anastasia Pribylova	(Germany) Julia Wachaczyk (Ukraine) Oleksandra Korashvili	(Austria) Melanie Klaffner (Thailand) Bunyawi Thamchaiwat (Russia) Margarita Skryabina (United Kingdom) Katie Boulter
April 11	Sharm el-Sheikh, Egypt; Hard $10,000; Singles and doubles draws	(Austria) Melanie Klaffner (Germany) Julia Wachaczyk; 6–4, 2–6, [13–11]	(United Kingdom) Katie Boulter (Ukraine) Oleksandra Korashvili	(Germany) Julia Wachaczyk (Ukraine) Oleksandra Korashvili	(Austria) Melanie Klaffner (Thailand) Bunyawi Thamchaiwat (Russia) Margarita Skryabina (United Kingdom) Katie Boulter
April 11	Dijon, France; Hard (indoor) $10,000; Singles and doubles draws	(Russia) Maria Marfutina; 4–6, 6–2, 6–0	(Spain) Ainhoa Atucha Gómez	(France) Priscilla Heise (Belgium) Klaartje Liebens	(Belgium) Hélène Scholsen (Netherlands) Chayenne Ewijk (Germany) Sarah-Rebecca Sekulic (Romania) Karola Bejenaru
April 11	Dijon, France; Hard (indoor) $10,000; Singles and doubles draws	(Netherlands) Chayenne Ewijk (Netherlands) Rosalie van der Hoek; 6–2, 6–0	(France) Manon Peral (France) Maud Vigne	(France) Priscilla Heise (Belgium) Klaartje Liebens	(Belgium) Hélène Scholsen (Netherlands) Chayenne Ewijk (Germany) Sarah-Rebecca Sekulic (Romania) Karola Bejenaru
April 11	Heraklion, Greece; Hard $10,000; Singles and doubles draws	(Romania) Raluca Șerban; 6–3, 7–6^{(7–4)}	(Italy) Cristiana Ferrando	(Spain) Irene Burillo Escorihuela (Hungary) Dalma Gálfi	(Netherlands) Kelly Versteeg (France) Margot Yerolymos (United States) Nadja Gilchrist (Russia) Victoria Kan
April 11	Heraklion, Greece; Hard $10,000; Singles and doubles draws	(Italy) Cristiana Ferrando (Hungary) Dalma Gálfi; 6–4, 5–7, [14–12]	(Russia) Kseniia Bekker (Romania) Raluca Șerban	(Spain) Irene Burillo Escorihuela (Hungary) Dalma Gálfi	(Netherlands) Kelly Versteeg (France) Margot Yerolymos (United States) Nadja Gilchrist (Russia) Victoria Kan
April 11	Pula, Italy; Clay $10,000; Singles and doubles draws	(Russia) Olesya Pervushina; 7–6^{(7–1)}, 6–3	(Italy) Bianca Turati	(Italy) Alice Balducci (France) Marie Témin	(Ukraine) Sofiya Kovalets (Bosnia and Herzegovina) Jelena Simić (Hungary) Vanda Lukács (Spain) Olga Sáez Larra
April 11	Pula, Italy; Clay $10,000; Singles and doubles draws	(Italy) Alice Balducci (Spain) Olga Parres Azcoitia; 3–6, 6–2, [10–6]	(Hungary) Vanda Lukács (Slovakia) Kristína Schmiedlová	(Italy) Alice Balducci (France) Marie Témin	(Ukraine) Sofiya Kovalets (Bosnia and Herzegovina) Jelena Simić (Hungary) Vanda Lukács (Spain) Olga Sáez Larra
April 11	Hammamet, Tunisia; Clay $10,000; Singles and doubles draws	(Slovenia) Tamara Zidanšek; 6–1, 6–0	(France) Alice Bacquié	(France) Manon Arcangioli (Greece) Valentini Grammatikopoulou	(Italy) Angelica Moratelli (France) Victoria Larrière (Switzerland) Lisa Sabino (Algeria) Inès Ibbou
April 11	Hammamet, Tunisia; Clay $10,000; Singles and doubles draws	(Canada) Petra Januskova (Italy) Angelica Moratelli; 7–6^{(9–7)}, 7–5	(Portugal) Maria Palhoto (Ecuador) Charlotte Römer	(France) Manon Arcangioli (Greece) Valentini Grammatikopoulou	(Italy) Angelica Moratelli (France) Victoria Larrière (Switzerland) Lisa Sabino (Algeria) Inès Ibbou
April 11	Antalya, Turkey; Hard $10,000; Singles and doubles draws	(Belarus) Iryna Shymanovich; 6–3, 6–2	(United States) Tina Tehrani	(Georgia (country)) Ana Shanidze (Bulgaria) Viktoriya Tomova	(Oman) Fatma Al-Nabhani (Germany) Dana Kremer (Russia) Anastasia Gasanova (United Kingdom) Emily Arbuthnott
April 11	Antalya, Turkey; Hard $10,000; Singles and doubles draws	(United Kingdom) Emily Arbuthnott (United Kingdom) Harriet Dart; 6–1, 6–0	(Russia) Anastasia Gasanova (Georgia (country)) Ana Shanidze	(Georgia (country)) Ana Shanidze (Bulgaria) Viktoriya Tomova	(Oman) Fatma Al-Nabhani (Germany) Dana Kremer (Russia) Anastasia Gasanova (United Kingdom) Emily Arbuthnott
April 18	Hardee's Pro Classic; Dothan, United States; Clay $50,000; Singles – Doubles	(Sweden) Rebecca Peterson; 6–4, 6–2	(United States) Taylor Townsend	(Russia) Alla Kudryavtseva (United States) Jessica Pegula	(United States) Anna Tatishvili (United States) Jennifer Brady (United States) Katerina Stewart (United States) Maria Sanchez
April 18	Hardee's Pro Classic; Dothan, United States; Clay $50,000; Singles – Doubles	(United States) Asia Muhammad (United States) Taylor Townsend; 6–0, 6–1	(United States) Caitlin Whoriskey (United States) Keri Wong	(Russia) Alla Kudryavtseva (United States) Jessica Pegula	(United States) Anna Tatishvili (United States) Jennifer Brady (United States) Katerina Stewart (United States) Maria Sanchez
April 18	Nanning, China; Hard $25,000; Singles and doubles draws	(China) Zhang Kailin; 6–3, 6–4	(China) Liu Fangzhou	(Slovenia) Dalila Jakupović (China) Lu Jingjing	(Japan) Riko Sawayanagi (Japan) Erika Sema (China) Liu Chang (Japan) Mayo Hibi
April 18	Nanning, China; Hard $25,000; Singles and doubles draws	(China) Liu Chang (Thailand) Varatchaya Wongteanchai; 6–1, 6–4	(Russia) Ksenia Lykina (United Kingdom) Emily Webley-Smith	(Slovenia) Dalila Jakupović (China) Lu Jingjing	(Japan) Riko Sawayanagi (Japan) Erika Sema (China) Liu Chang (Japan) Mayo Hibi
April 18	Bauru, Brazil; Clay $10,000; Singles and doubles draws	(Argentina) Paula Ormaechea; 1–6, 6–3, 7–5	(Argentina) Julieta Estable	(Brazil) Nathaly Kurata (France) Harmony Tan	(Chile) Andrea Koch Benvenuto (France) Marine Partaud (Brazil) Eduarda Piai (Argentina) Stephanie Mariel Petit
April 18	Bauru, Brazil; Clay $10,000; Singles and doubles draws	(Brazil) Nathaly Kurata (Brazil) Eduarda Piai; 7–6^{(7–4)}, 7–5	(Brazil) Carolina Alves (Argentina) Julieta Estable	(Brazil) Nathaly Kurata (France) Harmony Tan	(Chile) Andrea Koch Benvenuto (France) Marine Partaud (Brazil) Eduarda Piai (Argentina) Stephanie Mariel Petit
April 18	Sharm el-Sheikh, Egypt; Hard $10,000; Singles and doubles draws	(United Kingdom) Katie Boulter; 4–6, 6–3, 7–5	(Russia) Anastasia Pribylova	(Russia) Anna Pribylova (France) Estelle Cascino	(Austria) Melanie Klaffner (Romania) Jaqueline Cristian (France) Clémence Fayol (United Kingdom) Samantha Murray
April 18	Sharm el-Sheikh, Egypt; Hard $10,000; Singles and doubles draws	(Russia) Anastasia Pribylova (Hungary) Naomi Totka; 6–1, 3–6, [14–12]	(Egypt) Ola Abou Zekry (Greece) Despina Papamichail	(Russia) Anna Pribylova (France) Estelle Cascino	(Austria) Melanie Klaffner (Romania) Jaqueline Cristian (France) Clémence Fayol (United Kingdom) Samantha Murray
April 18	Heraklion, Greece; Hard $10,000; Singles and doubles draws	(Italy) Nastassja Burnett; 6–4, 7–6^{(7–4)}	(Latvia) Diāna Marcinkēviča	(United States) Emina Bektas (South Africa) Chanel Simmonds	(Spain) Irene Burillo Escorihuela (Russia) Valeria Savinykh (United Kingdom) Freya Christie (Ukraine) Alyona Sotnikova
April 18	Heraklion, Greece; Hard $10,000; Singles and doubles draws	(United Kingdom) Freya Christie (South Africa) Chanel Simmonds; 6–4, 6–0	(Russia) Valeria Savinykh (Ukraine) Alyona Sotnikova	(United States) Emina Bektas (South Africa) Chanel Simmonds	(Spain) Irene Burillo Escorihuela (Russia) Valeria Savinykh (United Kingdom) Freya Christie (Ukraine) Alyona Sotnikova
April 18	Pula, Italy; Clay $10,000; Singles and doubles draws	(Italy) Jasmine Paolini; 0–1, ret.	(France) Tessah Andrianjafitrimo	(Italy) Alice Balducci (Italy) Claudia Giovine	(Australia) Priscilla Hon (Italy) Gioia Barbieri (Italy) Martina Trevisan (Italy) Martina Di Giuseppe
April 18	Pula, Italy; Clay $10,000; Singles and doubles draws	(Austria) Pia König (Ukraine) Sofiya Kovalets; 6–3, 3–6, [10–8]	(France) Vinciane Rémy (France) Marie Témin	(Italy) Alice Balducci (Italy) Claudia Giovine	(Australia) Priscilla Hon (Italy) Gioia Barbieri (Italy) Martina Trevisan (Italy) Martina Di Giuseppe
April 18	Shymkent, Kazakhstan; Clay $10,000; Singles and doubles draws	(Kazakhstan) Kamila Kerimbayeva; 6–4, 6–4	(Russia) Ekaterina Kazionova	(Belarus) Ilona Kremen (South Korea) Han Sung-hee	(Uzbekistan) Komola Umarova (Germany) Lisa Matviyenko (Belarus) Sviatlana Pirazhenka (Russia) Nonna Kurginyan
April 18	Shymkent, Kazakhstan; Clay $10,000; Singles and doubles draws	(Belarus) Ilona Kremen (Belarus) Sviatlana Pirazhenka; 4–6, 7–6^{(7–4)}, [10–8]	(Russia) Anastasia Frolova (Kazakhstan) Kamila Kerimbayeva	(Belarus) Ilona Kremen (South Korea) Han Sung-hee	(Uzbekistan) Komola Umarova (Germany) Lisa Matviyenko (Belarus) Sviatlana Pirazhenka (Russia) Nonna Kurginyan
April 18	Hammamet, Tunisia; Clay $10,000; Singles and doubles draws	(Poland) Sandra Zaniewska; 7–6^{(7–4)}, 6–2	(Italy) Angelica Moratelli	(Hungary) Vanda Lukács (Switzerland) Lisa Sabino	(France) Manon Arcangioli (Serbia) Natalija Kostić (Germany) Caroline Werner (United States) Madeleine Kobelt
April 18	Hammamet, Tunisia; Clay $10,000; Singles and doubles draws	(France) Manon Arcangioli (Italy) Angelica Moratelli; 6–3, 6–4	(Algeria) Inès Ibbou (Canada) Petra Januskova	(Hungary) Vanda Lukács (Switzerland) Lisa Sabino	(France) Manon Arcangioli (Serbia) Natalija Kostić (Germany) Caroline Werner (United States) Madeleine Kobelt
April 18	Antalya, Turkey; Hard $10,000; Singles and doubles draws	(Belarus) Iryna Shymanovich; 6–0, 6–1	(Germany) Dana Kremer	(Romania) Daiana Negreanu (Netherlands) Bibiane Weijers	(Romania) Nicoleta Dascălu (Belgium) Eliessa Vanlangendonck (Russia) Anastasia Gasanova (France) Lou Brouleau
April 18	Antalya, Turkey; Hard $10,000; Singles and doubles draws	(United Kingdom) Jazzamay Drew (Belarus) Iryna Shymanovich; 3–6, 6–1, [10–2]	(Germany) Tayisiya Morderger (Germany) Yana Morderger	(Romania) Daiana Negreanu (Netherlands) Bibiane Weijers	(Romania) Nicoleta Dascălu (Belgium) Eliessa Vanlangendonck (Russia) Anastasia Gasanova (France) Lou Brouleau
April 25	Boyd Tinsley Women's Clay Court Classic; Charlottesville, United States; Clay $50,000; Singles – Doubles	(United States) Taylor Townsend; 7–5, 6–1	(United States) Grace Min	(Bulgaria) Elitsa Kostova (United States) Anna Tatishvili	(United States) Kayla Day (United States) Sachia Vickery (Russia) Alexandra Panova (United States) Jessica Pegula
April 25	Boyd Tinsley Women's Clay Court Classic; Charlottesville, United States; Clay $50,000; Singles – Doubles	(United States) Asia Muhammad (United States) Taylor Townsend; 7–6^{(7–4)}, 6–0	(Russia) Alexandra Panova (United States) Shelby Rogers	(Bulgaria) Elitsa Kostova (United States) Anna Tatishvili	(United States) Kayla Day (United States) Sachia Vickery (Russia) Alexandra Panova (United States) Jessica Pegula
April 25	Wiesbaden, Germany; Clay $25,000; Singles and doubles draws	(Russia) Victoria Kan; 6–2, 4–6, 6–0	(Germany) Laura Schaeder	(Russia) Polina Vinogradova (Slovakia) Vivien Juhászová	(Russia) Natalia Vikhlyantseva (Canada) Sharon Fichman (Germany) Anna Zaja (Belgium) Elyne Boeykens
April 25	Wiesbaden, Germany; Clay $25,000; Singles and doubles draws	(Belgium) Marie Benoît (Netherlands) Arantxa Rus; 6–2, 6–2	(Belgium) Steffi Distelmans (Netherlands) Demi Schuurs	(Russia) Polina Vinogradova (Slovakia) Vivien Juhászová	(Russia) Natalia Vikhlyantseva (Canada) Sharon Fichman (Germany) Anna Zaja (Belgium) Elyne Boeykens
April 25	Chiasso, Switzerland; Clay $25,000; Singles and doubles draws	(Bulgaria) Isabella Shinikova; 6–3, 7–6^{(7–1)}	(United Kingdom) Amanda Carreras	(Romania) Elena Gabriela Ruse (Austria) Julia Grabher	(Slovenia) Tamara Zidanšek (Hungary) Réka Luca Jani (Egypt) Sandra Samir (Switzerland) Jil Teichmann
April 25	Chiasso, Switzerland; Clay $25,000; Singles and doubles draws	(Germany) Antonia Lottner (Germany) Anne Schäfer; 6–1, 6–1	(Poland) Olga Brózda (Poland) Katarzyna Kawa	(Romania) Elena Gabriela Ruse (Austria) Julia Grabher	(Slovenia) Tamara Zidanšek (Hungary) Réka Luca Jani (Egypt) Sandra Samir (Switzerland) Jil Teichmann
April 25	Villa del Dique, Argentina; Clay $10,000; Singles and doubles draws	(United States) Ellie Halbauer; 7–5, 6–2	(Chile) Fernanda Brito	(Argentina) Julieta Estable (Argentina) Victoria Bosio	(Bolivia) Noelia Zeballos (Russia) Anzhelika Isaeva (Brazil) Carolina Alves (Argentina) Melina Ferrero
April 25	Villa del Dique, Argentina; Clay $10,000; Singles and doubles draws	(Chile) Fernanda Brito (Paraguay) Camila Giangreco Campiz; 6–3, 7–5	(Brazil) Nathaly Kurata (Brazil) Eduarda Piai	(Argentina) Julieta Estable (Argentina) Victoria Bosio	(Bolivia) Noelia Zeballos (Russia) Anzhelika Isaeva (Brazil) Carolina Alves (Argentina) Melina Ferrero
April 25	Tučepi, Croatia; Clay $10,000; Singles and doubles draws	(Croatia) Ani Mijačika; 6–3, 1–6, 6–3	(Croatia) Tereza Mrdeža	(Slovenia) Nina Potočnik (Slovenia) Eva Zagorac	(Serbia) Bojana Marković (Serbia) Katarina Jokić (Sweden) Paulina Milosavljevic (Croatia) Adrijana Lekaj
April 25	Tučepi, Croatia; Clay $10,000; Singles and doubles draws	(United States) Dasha Ivanova (Czech Republic) Petra Krejsová; 6–3, 2–6, [10–5]	(Finland) Emma Laine (Croatia) Adrijana Lekaj	(Slovenia) Nina Potočnik (Slovenia) Eva Zagorac	(Serbia) Bojana Marković (Serbia) Katarina Jokić (Sweden) Paulina Milosavljevic (Croatia) Adrijana Lekaj
April 25	Sharm el-Sheikh, Egypt; Hard $10,000; Singles and doubles draws	(Germany) Julia Wachaczyk; 6–3, 6–4	(United Kingdom) Samantha Murray	(Austria) Melanie Klaffner (France) Clémence Fayol	(Sweden) Linnéa Malmqvist (Japan) Michika Ozeki (Thailand) Noppawan Lertcheewakarn (Egypt) Ola Abou Zekry
April 25	Sharm el-Sheikh, Egypt; Hard $10,000; Singles and doubles draws	(United Kingdom) Samantha Murray (Greece) Despina Papamichail; 6–3, 6–2	(Egypt) Ola Abou Zekry (Romania) Jaqueline Cristian	(Austria) Melanie Klaffner (France) Clémence Fayol	(Sweden) Linnéa Malmqvist (Japan) Michika Ozeki (Thailand) Noppawan Lertcheewakarn (Egypt) Ola Abou Zekry
April 25	Heraklion, Greece; Hard $10,000; Singles and doubles draws	(Latvia) Diāna Marcinkēviča; 6–1, 6–3	(France) Sara Cakarevic	(France) Margot Yerolymos (Ukraine) Alyona Sotnikova	(Moldova) Alexandra Perper (Russia) Alina Silich (United Kingdom) Sarah Beth Grey (Russia) Valeria Savinykh
April 25	Heraklion, Greece; Hard $10,000; Singles and doubles draws	(Russia) Valeria Savinykh (Ukraine) Alyona Sotnikova; 4–6, 6–4, [10–7]	(Russia) Kseniia Bekker (Russia) Alina Silich	(France) Margot Yerolymos (Ukraine) Alyona Sotnikova	(Moldova) Alexandra Perper (Russia) Alina Silich (United Kingdom) Sarah Beth Grey (Russia) Valeria Savinykh
April 25	Győr, Hungary; Clay $10,000; Singles and doubles draws	(Hungary) Bianka Békefi; 3–6, 7–5, 6–2	(Hungary) Luca Nagymihály	(Serbia) Dejana Radanović (Hungary) Ágnes Bukta	(Serbia) Vesna Dolonc (Ukraine) Anastasiya Shoshyna (Slovakia) Lenka Juríková (Argentina) Guadalupe Pérez Rojas
April 25	Győr, Hungary; Clay $10,000; Singles and doubles draws	(Argentina) Guadalupe Pérez Rojas (United Kingdom) Francesca Stephenson; 6–4, 2–6, [10–6]	(Romania) Daiana Negreanu (Hungary) Rebeka Stolmár	(Serbia) Dejana Radanović (Hungary) Ágnes Bukta	(Serbia) Vesna Dolonc (Ukraine) Anastasiya Shoshyna (Slovakia) Lenka Juríková (Argentina) Guadalupe Pérez Rojas
April 25	Pula, Italy; Clay $10,000; Singles and doubles draws	(Italy) Camilla Scala; 6–1, 5–7, 6–1	(Italy) Anna Remondina	(Ukraine) Sofiya Kovalets (United Kingdom) Lisa Whybourn	(Austria) Pia König (Germany) Luisa Marie Huber (India) Snehadevi Reddy (Australia) Priscilla Hon
April 25	Pula, Italy; Clay $10,000; Singles and doubles draws	(Austria) Pia König (United Kingdom) Lisa Whybourn; 1–6, 7–5, [11–9]	(Italy) Marcella Cucca (Italy) Camilla Scala	(Ukraine) Sofiya Kovalets (United Kingdom) Lisa Whybourn	(Austria) Pia König (Germany) Luisa Marie Huber (India) Snehadevi Reddy (Australia) Priscilla Hon
April 25	Shymkent, Kazakhstan; Clay $10,000; Singles and doubles draws	(Russia) Anna Kalinskaya; 6–4, 6–2	(Belarus) Ilona Kremen	(South Korea) Han Sung-hee (Uzbekistan) Komola Umarova	(Uzbekistan) Sabina Sharipova (Russia) Marta Paigina (Belarus) Sviatlana Pirazhenka (Germany) Lisa Matviyenko
April 25	Shymkent, Kazakhstan; Clay $10,000; Singles and doubles draws	(Belarus) Ilona Kremen (Belarus) Sviatlana Pirazhenka; 6–3, 6–4	(Russia) Anastasia Frolova (Kazakhstan) Kamila Kerimbayeva	(South Korea) Han Sung-hee (Uzbekistan) Komola Umarova	(Uzbekistan) Sabina Sharipova (Russia) Marta Paigina (Belarus) Sviatlana Pirazhenka (Germany) Lisa Matviyenko
April 25	Hammamet, Tunisia; Clay $10,000; Singles and doubles draws	(Poland) Sandra Zaniewska; 6–1, 6–4	(Algeria) Inès Ibbou	(India) Sowjanya Bavisetti (Serbia) Natalija Kostić	(France) Fiona Codino (Germany) Nora Niedmers (Germany) Caroline Werner (Hungary) Vanda Lukács
April 25	Hammamet, Tunisia; Clay $10,000; Singles and doubles draws	(United States) Madeleine Kobelt (Germany) Nora Niedmers; 1–6, 6–3, [10–7]	(Algeria) Inès Ibbou (Canada) Petra Januskova	(India) Sowjanya Bavisetti (Serbia) Natalija Kostić	(France) Fiona Codino (Germany) Nora Niedmers (Germany) Caroline Werner (Hungary) Vanda Lukács
April 25	Manisa, Turkey; Clay $10,000; Singles and doubles draws	(North Macedonia) Lina Gjorcheska; 6–1, 6–2	(Ukraine) Alona Fomina	(Austria) Natasha Bredl (Australia) Abbie Myers	(Czech Republic) Tereza Kolářová (Bulgaria) Petia Arshinkova (Bulgaria) Julia Stamatova (Turkey) Melis Sezer
April 25	Manisa, Turkey; Clay $10,000; Singles and doubles draws	(Australia) Abbie Myers (Turkey) Melis Sezer; 6–4, 6–4	(Greece) Eleni Daniilidou (Russia) Margarita Lazareva	(Austria) Natasha Bredl (Australia) Abbie Myers	(Czech Republic) Tereza Kolářová (Bulgaria) Petia Arshinkova (Bulgaria) Julia Stamatova (Turkey) Melis Sezer

=== May ===
Week of	Tournament	Winner	Runners-up	Semifinalists	Quarterfinalists
May 2	Kunming Open; Anning, China; Clay $100,000; Singles – Doubles	(China) Zhang Kailin; 6–1, 0–6, 4–2, ret.	(China) Peng Shuai	(China) Liu Chang (China) Han Xinyun	(Australia) Jessica Moore (Bulgaria) Aleksandrina Naydenova (Russia) Viktoria Kamenskaya (China) Xu Shilin
May 2	Kunming Open; Anning, China; Clay $100,000; Singles – Doubles	(China) Wang Yafan (China) Zhang Kailin; 6–7^{(3–7)}, 7–6^{(7–2)}, [10–1]	(Thailand) Varatchaya Wongteanchai (China) Yang Zhaoxuan	(China) Liu Chang (China) Han Xinyun	(Australia) Jessica Moore (Bulgaria) Aleksandrina Naydenova (Russia) Viktoria Kamenskaya (China) Xu Shilin
May 2	Engie Open de Cagnes-sur-Mer Alpes-Maritimes; Cagnes-sur-Mer, France; Clay $100,000; Singles – Doubles	(Poland) Magda Linette; 6–3, 7–5	(Germany) Carina Witthöft	(Germany) Tatjana Maria (Ukraine) Maryna Zanevska	(Ukraine) Kateryna Kozlova (France) Pauline Parmentier (Switzerland) Stefanie Vögele (Kazakhstan) Zarina Diyas
May 2	Engie Open de Cagnes-sur-Mer Alpes-Maritimes; Cagnes-sur-Mer, France; Clay $100,000; Singles – Doubles	(Romania) Andreea Mitu (Netherlands) Demi Schuurs; 6–4, 7–5	(Switzerland) Xenia Knoll (Serbia) Aleksandra Krunić	(Germany) Tatjana Maria (Ukraine) Maryna Zanevska	(Ukraine) Kateryna Kozlova (France) Pauline Parmentier (Switzerland) Stefanie Vögele (Kazakhstan) Zarina Diyas
May 2	Kangaroo Cup; Gifu, Japan; Hard $75,000+H; Singles – Doubles	(Japan) Hiroko Kuwata; 6–2, 2–6, 6–4	(China) Wang Qiang	(Japan) Shuko Aoyama (China) Zhu Lin	(Japan) Mayo Hibi (Japan) Eri Hozumi (Japan) Riko Sawayanagi (China) Liu Fangzhou
May 2	Kangaroo Cup; Gifu, Japan; Hard $75,000+H; Singles – Doubles	(Japan) Eri Hozumi (Japan) Miyu Kato; 6–1, 6–2	(Japan) Hiroko Kuwata (Japan) Ayaka Okuno	(Japan) Shuko Aoyama (China) Zhu Lin	(Japan) Mayo Hibi (Japan) Eri Hozumi (Japan) Riko Sawayanagi (China) Liu Fangzhou
May 2	Revolution Technologies Pro Tennis Classic; Indian Harbour Beach, United States; Clay $75,000; Singles – Doubles	(United States) Jennifer Brady; 6–3, 7–5	(United States) Taylor Townsend	(United States) Anna Tatishvili (United States) Asia Muhammad	(United States) Shelby Rogers (United States) Grace Min (Russia) Alexandra Panova (United States) Bernarda Pera
May 2	Revolution Technologies Pro Tennis Classic; Indian Harbour Beach, United States; Clay $75,000; Singles – Doubles	(Israel) Julia Glushko (Russia) Alexandra Panova; 7–5, 6–4	(United States) Jessica Pegula (United States) Maria Sanchez	(United States) Anna Tatishvili (United States) Asia Muhammad	(United States) Shelby Rogers (United States) Grace Min (Russia) Alexandra Panova (United States) Bernarda Pera
May 2	Nana Trophy; Tunis, Tunisia; Clay $50,000; Singles – Doubles	(Tunisia) Ons Jabeur; 1–6, 6–2, 6–2	(Switzerland) Romina Oprandi	(Russia) Irina Khromacheva (Netherlands) Lesley Kerkhove	(Bulgaria) Isabella Shinikova (France) Myrtille Georges (France) Shérazad Reix (Uzbekistan) Sabina Sharipova
May 2	Nana Trophy; Tunis, Tunisia; Clay $50,000; Singles – Doubles	(Australia) Arina Rodionova (Ukraine) Valeriya Strakhova; 6–1, 6–2	(Russia) Irina Khromacheva (Turkey) İpek Soylu	(Russia) Irina Khromacheva (Netherlands) Lesley Kerkhove	(Bulgaria) Isabella Shinikova (France) Myrtille Georges (France) Shérazad Reix (Uzbekistan) Sabina Sharipova
May 2	Villa María, Argentina; Clay $10,000; Singles and doubles draws	(Chile) Fernanda Brito; 4–6, 6–3, 6–2	(United States) Ellie Halbauer	(Argentina) Victoria Bosio (Paraguay) Camila Giangreco Campiz	(Chile) Bárbara Gatica (Argentina) Constanza Vega (Argentina) Julieta Estable (United States) Stephanie Nemtsova
May 2	Villa María, Argentina; Clay $10,000; Singles and doubles draws	(Brazil) Carolina Alves (Argentina) Constanza Vega; 6–1, 7–6^{(7–4)}	(Chile) Bárbara Gatica (Argentina) Stephanie Mariel Petit	(Argentina) Victoria Bosio (Paraguay) Camila Giangreco Campiz	(Chile) Bárbara Gatica (Argentina) Constanza Vega (Argentina) Julieta Estable (United States) Stephanie Nemtsova
May 2	Bol, Croatia; Clay $10,000; Singles and doubles draws	(Czech Republic) Magdaléna Pantůčková; 6–1, 4–6, 6–2	(Czech Republic) Gabriela Pantůčková	(Norway) Melanie Stokke (United States) Maria Mateas	(Slovenia) Manca Pislak (Germany) Vivian Wolff (Slovenia) Polona Reberšak (Ukraine) Anastasiya Fedoryshyn
May 2	Bol, Croatia; Clay $10,000; Singles and doubles draws	(United States) Dasha Ivanova (Czech Republic) Petra Krejsová; 6–1, 6–3	(Australia) Naiktha Bains (United States) Alexandra Morozova	(Norway) Melanie Stokke (United States) Maria Mateas	(Slovenia) Manca Pislak (Germany) Vivian Wolff (Slovenia) Polona Reberšak (Ukraine) Anastasiya Fedoryshyn
May 2	Sharm el-Sheikh, Egypt; Hard $10,000; Singles and doubles draws	(Thailand) Noppawan Lertcheewakarn; 6–4, 6–1	(India) Prerna Bhambri	(Egypt) Ola Abou Zekry (United Kingdom) Samantha Murray	(Romania) Jaqueline Cristian (Greece) Despina Papamichail (Australia) Sara Tomic (Hungary) Naomi Totka
May 2	Sharm el-Sheikh, Egypt; Hard $10,000; Singles and doubles draws	(United Kingdom) Samantha Murray (Greece) Despina Papamichail; 3–6, 6–2, [10–1]	(India) Nidhi Chilumula (India) Rishika Sunkara	(Egypt) Ola Abou Zekry (United Kingdom) Samantha Murray	(Romania) Jaqueline Cristian (Greece) Despina Papamichail (Australia) Sara Tomic (Hungary) Naomi Totka
May 2	Győr, Hungary; Clay $10,000; Singles and doubles draws	(Serbia) Vesna Dolonc; 6–3, 7–5	(Ukraine) Anastasiya Shoshyna	(Hungary) Bianka Békefi (Argentina) Guadalupe Pérez Rojas	(Hungary) Luca Nagymihály (Hungary) Rebeka Stolmár (Czech Republic) Gabriela Horáčková (Ukraine) Nadiya Kolb
May 2	Győr, Hungary; Clay $10,000; Singles and doubles draws	(Romania) Daiana Negreanu (Hungary) Rebeka Stolmár; 7–6^{(7–4)}, 6–0	(Ukraine) Maryna Kolb (Ukraine) Nadiya Kolb	(Hungary) Bianka Békefi (Argentina) Guadalupe Pérez Rojas	(Hungary) Luca Nagymihály (Hungary) Rebeka Stolmár (Czech Republic) Gabriela Horáčková (Ukraine) Nadiya Kolb
May 2	Pula, Italy; Clay $10,000; Singles and doubles draws	(Australia) Priscilla Hon; 6–2, 6–2	(Switzerland) Jessica Crivelletto	(Italy) Anna Turati (India) Snehadevi Reddy	(Italy) Camilla Scala (India) Karman Thandi (Russia) Anastasia Chikalkina (Switzerland) Tess Sugnaux
May 2	Pula, Italy; Clay $10,000; Singles and doubles draws	(Italy) Federica Arcidiacono (Italy) Gaia Sanesi; 6–4, 6–1	(Italy) Veronica Napolitano (Italy) Anna Remondina	(Italy) Anna Turati (India) Snehadevi Reddy	(Italy) Camilla Scala (India) Karman Thandi (Russia) Anastasia Chikalkina (Switzerland) Tess Sugnaux
May 2	Khimki, Russia; Hard (indoor) $10,000; Singles and doubles draws	(Russia) Anastasia Gasanova; 3–6, 6–2, 6–3	(Russia) Yana Sizikova	(Russia) Polina Monova (Ukraine) Gyulnara Nazarova	(Russia) Alena Tarasova (Russia) Valeriya Yushchenko (Russia) Olga Doroshina (Russia) Anastasia Potapova
May 2	Khimki, Russia; Hard (indoor) $10,000; Singles and doubles draws	(Russia) Olga Doroshina (Russia) Alena Tarasova; 6–2, 6–4	(Russia) Polina Monova (Russia) Yana Sizikova	(Russia) Polina Monova (Ukraine) Gyulnara Nazarova	(Russia) Alena Tarasova (Russia) Valeriya Yushchenko (Russia) Olga Doroshina (Russia) Anastasia Potapova
May 2	Antalya, Turkey; Hard $10,000; Singles and doubles draws	(Turkey) Ayla Aksu; 6–4, 6–1	(Bulgaria) Julia Stamatova	(Australia) Abbie Myers (United States) Sarah Lee	(Austria) Natasha Bredl (Russia) Ulyana Ayzatulina (United Kingdom) Harriet Dart (Romania) Andreea Ghițescu
May 2	Antalya, Turkey; Hard $10,000; Singles and doubles draws	(United States) Emina Bektas (United States) Sarah Lee; 6–0, 6–3	(Turkey) Ayla Aksu (Bulgaria) Julia Stamatova	(Australia) Abbie Myers (United States) Sarah Lee	(Austria) Natasha Bredl (Russia) Ulyana Ayzatulina (United Kingdom) Harriet Dart (Romania) Andreea Ghițescu
May 9	Empire Slovak Open; Trnava, Slovakia; Clay $100,000; Singles – Doubles	(Czech Republic) Kateřina Siniaková; 7–6^{(7–4)}, 5–7, 6–0	(Latvia) Anastasija Sevastova	(Slovakia) Rebecca Šramková (Kazakhstan) Zarina Diyas	(Slovakia) Viktória Kužmová (Japan) Misa Eguchi (Poland) Paula Kania (Czech Republic) Kristýna Plíšková
May 9	Empire Slovak Open; Trnava, Slovakia; Clay $100,000; Singles – Doubles	(Russia) Anna Kalinskaya (Slovakia) Tereza Mihalíková; 6–1, 7–6^{(7–4)}	(Russia) Evgeniya Rodina (Latvia) Anastasija Sevastova	(Slovakia) Rebecca Šramková (Kazakhstan) Zarina Diyas	(Slovakia) Viktória Kužmová (Japan) Misa Eguchi (Poland) Paula Kania (Czech Republic) Kristýna Plíšková
May 9	Open Engie Saint-Gaudens Midi-Pyrénées; Saint-Gaudens, France; Clay $50,000+H; Singles – Doubles	(Russia) Irina Khromacheva; 1–6, 7–6^{(7–3)}, 6–1	(Greece) Maria Sakkari	(United Kingdom) Amanda Carreras (Brazil) Paula Cristina Gonçalves	(Paraguay) Verónica Cepede Royg (Switzerland) Viktorija Golubic (Russia) Natalia Vikhlyantseva (Switzerland) Amra Sadiković
May 9	Open Engie Saint-Gaudens Midi-Pyrénées; Saint-Gaudens, France; Clay $50,000+H; Singles – Doubles	(Netherlands) Demi Schuurs (Czech Republic) Renata Voráčová; 6–1, 6–2	(Germany) Nicola Geuer (Switzerland) Viktorija Golubic	(United Kingdom) Amanda Carreras (Brazil) Paula Cristina Gonçalves	(Paraguay) Verónica Cepede Royg (Switzerland) Viktorija Golubic (Russia) Natalia Vikhlyantseva (Switzerland) Amra Sadiković
May 9	Fukuoka International Women's Cup; Fukuoka, Japan; Grass $50,000; Singles – Doubles	(Russia) Ksenia Lykina; 6–2, 6–7^{(2–7)}, 6–0	(Japan) Kyōka Okamura	(Japan) Junri Namigata (Australia) Storm Sanders	(Netherlands) Indy de Vroome (Japan) Makoto Ninomiya (Chinese Taipei) Hsu Ching-wen (Japan) Shiho Akita
May 9	Fukuoka International Women's Cup; Fukuoka, Japan; Grass $50,000; Singles – Doubles	(Netherlands) Indy de Vroome (Bulgaria) Aleksandrina Naydenova; 6–4, 6–1	(Uzbekistan) Nigina Abduraimova (Russia) Ksenia Lykina	(Japan) Junri Namigata (Australia) Storm Sanders	(Netherlands) Indy de Vroome (Japan) Makoto Ninomiya (Chinese Taipei) Hsu Ching-wen (Japan) Shiho Akita
May 9	Győr, Hungary; Clay $25,000; Singles and doubles draws	(Slovenia) Tamara Zidanšek; 6–4, 6–4	(Russia) Ekaterina Alexandrova	(Czech Republic) Karolína Muchová (Austria) Barbara Haas	(Czech Republic) Tereza Martincová (Croatia) Tena Lukas (Romania) Irina Maria Bara (Romania) Daiana Negreanu
May 9	Győr, Hungary; Clay $25,000; Singles and doubles draws	(Hungary) Réka Luca Jani (Croatia) Ana Vrljić; 6–4, 6–3	(Hungary) Vanda Lukács (Slovakia) Chantal Škamlová	(Czech Republic) Karolína Muchová (Austria) Barbara Haas	(Czech Republic) Tereza Martincová (Croatia) Tena Lukas (Romania) Irina Maria Bara (Romania) Daiana Negreanu
May 9	La Marsa, Tunisia; Clay $25,000; Singles and doubles draws	(Russia) Victoria Kan; 6–4, 6–4	(Kazakhstan) Galina Voskoboeva	(Tunisia) Ons Jabeur (France) Shérazad Reix	(Italy) Cristiana Ferrando (Chile) Daniela Seguel (Russia) Vitalia Diatchenko (Uzbekistan) Sabina Sharipova
May 9	La Marsa, Tunisia; Clay $25,000; Singles and doubles draws	(Russia) Vitalia Diatchenko (Kazakhstan) Galina Voskoboeva; 6–3, 1–6, [12–10]	(Russia) Victoria Kan (Uzbekistan) Sabina Sharipova	(Tunisia) Ons Jabeur (France) Shérazad Reix	(Italy) Cristiana Ferrando (Chile) Daniela Seguel (Russia) Vitalia Diatchenko (Uzbekistan) Sabina Sharipova
May 9	Naples, United States; Clay $25,000; Singles and doubles draws	(Russia) Valeria Solovyeva; 6–4, 6–0	(United States) Kayla Day	(United States) Caroline Dolehide (United States) CiCi Bellis	(Sweden) Susanne Celik (United States) Sofia Kenin (Ukraine) Olga Ianchuk (Portugal) Michelle Larcher de Brito
May 9	Naples, United States; Clay $25,000; Singles and doubles draws	(Brazil) Gabriela Cé (Poland) Justyna Jegiołka; 6–1, 6–2	(United States) Sophie Chang (Mexico) Renata Zarazúa	(United States) Caroline Dolehide (United States) CiCi Bellis	(Sweden) Susanne Celik (United States) Sofia Kenin (Ukraine) Olga Ianchuk (Portugal) Michelle Larcher de Brito
May 9	Bol, Croatia; Clay $10,000; Singles and doubles draws	(Czech Republic) Gabriela Pantůčková; 7–5, 7–5	(Liechtenstein) Kathinka von Deichmann	(Czech Republic) Magdaléna Pantůčková (France) Marine Partaud	(Australia) Naiktha Bains (United States) Dasha Ivanova (Serbia) Bojana Marinković (Croatia) Ani Mijačika
May 9	Bol, Croatia; Clay $10,000; Singles and doubles draws	(Australia) Naiktha Bains (United States) Dasha Ivanova; 6–2, 4–6, [10–7]	(France) Marine Partaud (France) Laëtitia Sarrazin	(Czech Republic) Magdaléna Pantůčková (France) Marine Partaud	(Australia) Naiktha Bains (United States) Dasha Ivanova (Serbia) Bojana Marinković (Croatia) Ani Mijačika
May 9	Sharm el-Sheikh, Egypt; Hard $10,000; Singles and doubles draws	(Australia) Sara Tomic; 6–4, 6–1	(Russia) Anna Morgina	(Malaysia) Jawairiah Noordin (India) Prerna Bhambri	(France) Théo Gravouil (Portugal) Inês Murta (Sweden) Anette Munozova (India) Sri Peddi Reddy
May 9	Sharm el-Sheikh, Egypt; Hard $10,000; Singles and doubles draws	(Russia) Anna Morgina (Australia) Sara Tomic; 6–3, 6–2	(Greece) Eleni Kordolaimi (Sweden) Anette Munozova	(Malaysia) Jawairiah Noordin (India) Prerna Bhambri	(France) Théo Gravouil (Portugal) Inês Murta (Sweden) Anette Munozova (India) Sri Peddi Reddy
May 9	Pula, Italy; Clay $10,000; Singles and doubles draws	(Russia) Olesya Pervushina; 6–3, 3–6, 7–5	(Italy) Corinna Dentoni	(Belgium) Déborah Kerfs (India) Karman Thandi	(Russia) Sofya Zhuk (France) Margot Yerolymos (Georgia (country)) Sofia Kvatsabaia (Italy) Deborah Chiesa
May 9	Pula, Italy; Clay $10,000; Singles and doubles draws	(Italy) Deborah Chiesa (Spain) Olga Parres Azcoitia; 6–4, 6–4	(Italy) Federica Arcidiacono (Italy) Martina Spigarelli	(Belgium) Déborah Kerfs (India) Karman Thandi	(Russia) Sofya Zhuk (France) Margot Yerolymos (Georgia (country)) Sofia Kvatsabaia (Italy) Deborah Chiesa
May 9	Torneo Internacional de Tenis Femenino "Conchita Martínez"; Monzón, Spain; Hard $10,000; Singles and doubles draws	(Czech Republic) Marie Bouzková; 6–4, 6–4	(France) Jessika Ponchet	(United Kingdom) Gabriella Taylor (Spain) Estrella Cabeza Candela	(France) Alice Bacquié (Spain) María José Luque Moreno (India) Snehadevi Reddy (Armenia) Ani Amiraghyan
May 9	Torneo Internacional de Tenis Femenino "Conchita Martínez"; Monzón, Spain; Hard $10,000; Singles and doubles draws	(France) Alice Bacquié (United Kingdom) Gabriella Taylor; 6–1, 6–1	(Spain) Estrella Cabeza Candela (Spain) Cristina Sánchez Quintanar	(United Kingdom) Gabriella Taylor (Spain) Estrella Cabeza Candela	(France) Alice Bacquié (Spain) María José Luque Moreno (India) Snehadevi Reddy (Armenia) Ani Amiraghyan
May 9	Båstad, Sweden; Clay $10,000; Singles and doubles draws	(Denmark) Karen Barritza; 6–4, 6–4	(Sweden) Cornelia Lister	(Norway) Andrea Raaholt (Poland) Magdalena Fręch	(Netherlands) Nikki Luttikhuis (Norway) Astrid Brune Olsen (Sweden) Fanny Östlund (Germany) Katharina Hering
May 9	Båstad, Sweden; Clay $10,000; Singles and doubles draws	(Denmark) Emilie Francati (Sweden) Cornelia Lister; 6–2, 6–2	(Norway) Astrid Brune Olsen (Norway) Malene Helgø	(Norway) Andrea Raaholt (Poland) Magdalena Fręch	(Netherlands) Nikki Luttikhuis (Norway) Astrid Brune Olsen (Sweden) Fanny Östlund (Germany) Katharina Hering
May 9	Antalya, Turkey; Hard $10,000; Singles and doubles draws	(Turkey) Ayla Aksu; 6–1, 4–6, 7–6^{(7–1)}	(United States) Sarah Lee	(United Kingdom) Harriet Dart (Canada) Katherine Sebov	(Germany) Tayisiya Morderger (Russia) Ulyana Ayzatulina (India) Kyra Shroff (Canada) Marie-Alexandre Leduc
May 9	Antalya, Turkey; Hard $10,000; Singles and doubles draws	(United States) Sarah Lee (United States) Ashley Mackey; 6–2, 3–6, [10–8]	(Colombia) María Fernanda Herazo (Colombia) Yuliana Lizarazo	(United Kingdom) Harriet Dart (Canada) Katherine Sebov	(Germany) Tayisiya Morderger (Russia) Ulyana Ayzatulina (India) Kyra Shroff (Canada) Marie-Alexandre Leduc
May 16	Jinyuan Cup; Zhengzhou, China; Hard $50,000; Singles – Doubles	(Russia) Anastasia Pivovarova; 6–4, 6–4	(China) Lu Jingjing	(South Korea) Kim Na-ri (Bulgaria) Aleksandrina Naydenova	(United States) Danielle Lao (Belarus) Aryna Sabalenka (China) Peng Shuai (Uzbekistan) Akgul Amanmuradova
May 16	Jinyuan Cup; Zhengzhou, China; Hard $50,000; Singles – Doubles	(China) Xun Fangying (China) You Xiaodi; 1–6, 6–2, [10–7]	(Uzbekistan) Akgul Amanmuradova (Slovakia) Michaela Hončová	(South Korea) Kim Na-ri (Bulgaria) Aleksandrina Naydenova	(United States) Danielle Lao (Belarus) Aryna Sabalenka (China) Peng Shuai (Uzbekistan) Akgul Amanmuradova
May 16	Kurume Best Amenity Cup; Kurume, Japan; Grass $50,000; Singles – Doubles	(Japan) Kyōka Okamura; 7–6^{(12–10)}, 1–6, 7–5	(Uzbekistan) Nigina Abduraimova	(Belgium) An-Sophie Mestach (Russia) Ksenia Lykina	(Japan) Ayaka Okuno (Netherlands) Indy de Vroome (Hungary) Dalma Gálfi (United Kingdom) Katy Dunne
May 16	Kurume Best Amenity Cup; Kurume, Japan; Grass $50,000; Singles – Doubles	(Chinese Taipei) Hsu Ching-wen (Russia) Ksenia Lykina; 7–6^{(7–5)}, 6–2	(Hungary) Dalma Gálfi (China) Xu Shilin	(Belgium) An-Sophie Mestach (Russia) Ksenia Lykina	(Japan) Ayaka Okuno (Netherlands) Indy de Vroome (Hungary) Dalma Gálfi (United Kingdom) Katy Dunne
May 16	Caserta, Italy; Clay $25,000; Singles and doubles draws	(Bulgaria) Isabella Shinikova; 6–2, 4–6, 6–2	(Slovenia) Dalila Jakupović	(Slovakia) Rebecca Šramková (Italy) Anastasia Grymalska	(Romania) Nicoleta Dascălu (Italy) Alberta Brianti (Georgia (country)) Sofia Shapatava (Italy) Camilla Rosatello
May 16	Caserta, Italy; Clay $25,000; Singles and doubles draws	(United Kingdom) Amanda Carreras (Italy) Alice Savoretti; 6–7^{(9–11)}, 7–6^{(7–5)}, [10–6]	(Ukraine) Oleksandra Korashvili (Russia) Maria Marfutina	(Slovakia) Rebecca Šramková (Italy) Anastasia Grymalska	(Romania) Nicoleta Dascălu (Italy) Alberta Brianti (Georgia (country)) Sofia Shapatava (Italy) Camilla Rosatello
May 16	Goyang, South Korea; Hard $25,000; Singles and doubles draws	(South Korea) Han Na-lae; 6–3, 6–2	(United Kingdom) Harriet Dart	(Thailand) Bunyawi Thamchaiwat (South Korea) Lee So-ra	(Russia) Anastasia Gasanova (South Korea) Han Sung-hee (Oman) Fatma Al-Nabhani (Chinese Taipei) Lee Pei-chi
May 16	Goyang, South Korea; Hard $25,000; Singles and doubles draws	(United Kingdom) Freya Christie (United Kingdom) Harriet Dart; 6–3, 6–2	(Russia) Anastasia Gasanova (Australia) Maddison Inglis	(Thailand) Bunyawi Thamchaiwat (South Korea) Lee So-ra	(Russia) Anastasia Gasanova (South Korea) Han Sung-hee (Oman) Fatma Al-Nabhani (Chinese Taipei) Lee Pei-chi
May 16	Bol, Croatia; Clay $10,000; Singles and doubles draws	(Croatia) Tereza Mrdeža; 6–4, 0–6, 6–1	(Croatia) Tena Lukas	(Czech Republic) Magdaléna Pantůčková (France) Marine Partaud	(United States) Nicole Coopersmith (Slovenia) Manca Pislak (Czech Republic) Gabriela Pantůčková (Australia) Naiktha Bains
May 16	Bol, Croatia; Clay $10,000; Singles and doubles draws	(Australia) Naiktha Bains (United States) Alexandra Morozova; 6–1, 2–6, [10–7]	(United States) Dasha Ivanova (Czech Republic) Petra Krejsová	(Czech Republic) Magdaléna Pantůčková (France) Marine Partaud	(United States) Nicole Coopersmith (Slovenia) Manca Pislak (Czech Republic) Gabriela Pantůčková (Australia) Naiktha Bains
May 16	Sharm el-Sheikh, Egypt; Hard $10,000; Singles and doubles draws	(France) Théo Gravouil; 7–6^{(7–5)}, 6–4	(India) Sri Peddi Reddy	(Greece) Eleni Kordolaimi (India) Pranjala Yadlapalli	(Russia) Anna Morgina (Italy) Federica Prati (Brazil) Nathália Rossi (India) Nidhi Chilumula
May 16	Sharm el-Sheikh, Egypt; Hard $10,000; Singles and doubles draws	(India) Prerna Bhambri (India) Nidhi Chilumula; 3–6, 7–5, [10–7]	(Thailand) Tamachan Momkoonthod (India) Pranjala Yadlapalli	(Greece) Eleni Kordolaimi (India) Pranjala Yadlapalli	(Russia) Anna Morgina (Italy) Federica Prati (Brazil) Nathália Rossi (India) Nidhi Chilumula
May 16	Ramat Gan, Israel; Hard $10,000; Singles and doubles draws	(Russia) Polina Monova; 4–6, 6–1, 6–4	(Uzbekistan) Vlada Ekshibarova	(Romania) Daiana Negreanu (Russia) Marta Paigina	(France) Eléonore Barrère (Israel) Shahar Biran (Kazakhstan) Gozal Ainitdinova (United States) Sarah Lee
May 16	Ramat Gan, Israel; Hard $10,000; Singles and doubles draws	(Uzbekistan) Vlada Ekshibarova (Hungary) Naomi Totka; 6–2, 6–1	(Russia) Yuliya Kalabina (Russia) Polina Monova	(Romania) Daiana Negreanu (Russia) Marta Paigina	(France) Eléonore Barrère (Israel) Shahar Biran (Kazakhstan) Gozal Ainitdinova (United States) Sarah Lee
May 16	Galați, Romania; Clay $10,000; Singles and doubles draws	(Moldova) Alexandra Perper; 6–2, 1–6, 7–6^{(7–5)}	(Romania) Miriam Bulgaru	(Armenia) Ani Amiraghyan (Italy) Anna Remondina	(Romania) Iulia Ivașcu (Romania) Oana Gavrilă (Romania) Ioana Loredana Roșca (Germany) Caroline Werner
May 16	Galați, Romania; Clay $10,000; Singles and doubles draws	(Brazil) Maria Fernanda Alves (Argentina) Guadalupe Pérez Rojas; 6–4, 2–6, [10–8]	(Armenia) Ani Amiraghyan (Moldova) Alexandra Perper	(Armenia) Ani Amiraghyan (Italy) Anna Remondina	(Romania) Iulia Ivașcu (Romania) Oana Gavrilă (Romania) Ioana Loredana Roșca (Germany) Caroline Werner
May 16	Båstad, Sweden; Clay $10,000; Singles and doubles draws	(Switzerland) Patty Schnyder; 6–1, 6–3	(Norway) Melanie Stokke	(Sweden) Fanny Östlund (Sweden) Cornelia Lister	(Netherlands) Nikki Luttikhuis (Denmark) Karen Barritza (Sweden) Jacqueline Cabaj Awad (Denmark) Emilie Francati
May 16	Båstad, Sweden; Clay $10,000; Singles and doubles draws	(Denmark) Emilie Francati (Sweden) Cornelia Lister; 6–2, 6–4	(Romania) Irina Maria Bara (Norway) Melanie Stokke	(Sweden) Fanny Östlund (Sweden) Cornelia Lister	(Netherlands) Nikki Luttikhuis (Denmark) Karen Barritza (Sweden) Jacqueline Cabaj Awad (Denmark) Emilie Francati
May 16	Hammamet, Tunisia; Clay $10,000; Singles and doubles draws	(Switzerland) Lisa Sabino; 4–6, 7–5, 6–4	(Egypt) Sandra Samir	(Ukraine) Ganna Poznikhirenko (France) Audrey Albié	(Italy) Claudia Coppola (France) Sarah Finck (Serbia) Natalija Kostić (Canada) Petra Januskova
May 16	Hammamet, Tunisia; Clay $10,000; Singles and doubles draws	(Serbia) Natalija Kostić (Ukraine) Ganna Poznikhirenko; 6–4, 6–4	(France) Emmanuelle Girard (United Kingdom) Francesca Jones	(Ukraine) Ganna Poznikhirenko (France) Audrey Albié	(Italy) Claudia Coppola (France) Sarah Finck (Serbia) Natalija Kostić (Canada) Petra Januskova
May 16	Antalya, Turkey; Hard $10,000; Singles and doubles draws	(Colombia) María Fernanda Herazo; 6–3, 4–6, 2–1, ret.	(Canada) Marie-Alexandre Leduc	(Slovenia) Nastja Kolar (Canada) Katherine Sebov	(Bulgaria) Petia Arshinkova (United Kingdom) Francesca Stephenson (Colombia) Yuliana Lizarazo (Turkey) Melis Sezer
May 16	Antalya, Turkey; Hard $10,000; Singles and doubles draws	(India) Kyra Shroff (India) Dhruthi Tatachar Venugopal; 6–3, 5–7, [10–1]	(Slovenia) Nastja Kolar (United Kingdom) Francesca Stephenson	(Slovenia) Nastja Kolar (Canada) Katherine Sebov	(Bulgaria) Petia Arshinkova (United Kingdom) Francesca Stephenson (Colombia) Yuliana Lizarazo (Turkey) Melis Sezer
May 23	Tianjin Health Industry Park; Tianjin, China; Hard $50,000; Singles – Doubles	(Belarus) Aryna Sabalenka; 5–7, 6–3, 6–1	(Serbia) Nina Stojanović	(United States) Lauren Albanese (China) Liu Fangzhou	(China) Peng Shuai (United States) Danielle Lao (China) Lu Jingjing (Russia) Anastasia Pivovarova
May 23	Tianjin Health Industry Park; Tianjin, China; Hard $50,000; Singles – Doubles	(China) Li Yihong (China) Wang Yan; 1–6, 6–0, [10–4]	(China) Liu Wanting (China) Lu Jingjing	(United States) Lauren Albanese (China) Liu Fangzhou	(China) Peng Shuai (United States) Danielle Lao (China) Lu Jingjing (Russia) Anastasia Pivovarova
May 23	Grado, Italy; Clay $25,000; Singles and doubles draws	(Romania) Ana Bogdan; 2–6, 6–2, 7–6^{(7–1)}	(Sweden) Susanne Celik	(Argentina) Florencia Molinero (Spain) Paula Badosa Gibert	(Italy) Martina Di Giuseppe (Italy) Camilla Scala (Latvia) Diāna Marcinkēviča (Chile) Daniela Seguel
May 23	Grado, Italy; Clay $25,000; Singles and doubles draws	(Argentina) Catalina Pella (Chile) Daniela Seguel; 6–2, 7–6^{(10–8)}	(Turkey) Başak Eraydın (Italy) Alice Matteucci	(Argentina) Florencia Molinero (Spain) Paula Badosa Gibert	(Italy) Martina Di Giuseppe (Italy) Camilla Scala (Latvia) Diāna Marcinkēviča (Chile) Daniela Seguel
May 23	Karuizawa, Japan; Grass $25,000; Singles and doubles draws	(Uzbekistan) Nigina Abduraimova; 6–3, 7–5	(Belgium) An-Sophie Mestach	(Japan) Risa Ushijima (Netherlands) Indy de Vroome	(France) Joséphine Boualem (United Kingdom) Katy Dunne (Japan) Mana Ayukawa (Japan) Chihiro Nunome
May 23	Karuizawa, Japan; Grass $25,000; Singles and doubles draws	(Japan) Rika Fujiwara (Japan) Kotomi Takahata; 6–1, 6–4	(Japan) Mana Ayukawa (Japan) Yuuki Tanaka	(Japan) Risa Ushijima (Netherlands) Indy de Vroome	(France) Joséphine Boualem (United Kingdom) Katy Dunne (Japan) Mana Ayukawa (Japan) Chihiro Nunome
May 23	Incheon, South Korea; Hard $25,000; Singles and doubles draws	(South Korea) Jeong Su-nam; 6–4, 4–6, 6–4	(South Korea) Han Na-lae	(United Kingdom) Freya Christie (South Korea) Choi Ji-hee	(South Korea) Han Sung-hee (Indonesia) Beatrice Gumulya (South Korea) Hong Seung-yeon (South Korea) Lee So-ra
May 23	Incheon, South Korea; Hard $25,000; Singles and doubles draws	(South Korea) Han Sung-hee (Japan) Makoto Ninomiya; 6–3, 6–1	(Thailand) Kamonwan Buayam (Chinese Taipei) Lee Pei-chi	(United Kingdom) Freya Christie (South Korea) Choi Ji-hee	(South Korea) Han Sung-hee (Indonesia) Beatrice Gumulya (South Korea) Hong Seung-yeon (South Korea) Lee So-ra
May 23	Andijan, Uzbekistan; Hard $25,000; Singles and doubles draws	(Uzbekistan) Sabina Sharipova; 7–5, 6–0	(Russia) Veronika Kudermetova	(Czech Republic) Barbora Štefková (India) Ankita Raina	(Russia) Victoria Kan (United Kingdom) Gabriella Taylor (Russia) Natela Dzalamidze (Ukraine) Veronika Kapshay
May 23	Andijan, Uzbekistan; Hard $25,000; Singles and doubles draws	(Czech Republic) Barbora Štefková (Ukraine) Anastasiya Vasylyeva; 6–3, 4–6, [10–7]	(Russia) Victoria Kan (Uzbekistan) Sabina Sharipova	(Czech Republic) Barbora Štefková (India) Ankita Raina	(Russia) Victoria Kan (United Kingdom) Gabriella Taylor (Russia) Natela Dzalamidze (Ukraine) Veronika Kapshay
May 23	Baku, Azerbaijan; Hard $10,000; Singles and doubles draws	(Turkey) Melis Sezer; 6–1, 2–6, 6–2	(Belarus) Sadafmoh Tolibova	(Russia) Maria Kononova (Russia) Valeriya Zeleva	(Russia) Alexandra Dubrovina (Russia) Anzhelika Isaeva (Russia) Valeriya Yushchenko (Russia) Valeriya Urzhumova
May 23	Baku, Azerbaijan; Hard $10,000; Singles and doubles draws	(Turkey) Melis Sezer (Belarus) Sadafmoh Tolibova; 6–0, 7–5	(Russia) Ralina Kalimullina (Russia) Anastasia Nefedova	(Russia) Maria Kononova (Russia) Valeriya Zeleva	(Russia) Alexandra Dubrovina (Russia) Anzhelika Isaeva (Russia) Valeriya Yushchenko (Russia) Valeriya Urzhumova
May 23	Sharm el-Sheikh, Egypt; Hard $10,000; Singles and doubles draws	(France) Théo Gravouil; 6–1, 6–3	(Egypt) Ola Abou Zekry	(India) Nidhi Chilumula (Greece) Eleni Kordolaimi	(India) Sai Chamarthi (Portugal) Inês Murta (India) Pranjala Yadlapalli (India) Eetee Maheta
May 23	Sharm el-Sheikh, Egypt; Hard $10,000; Singles and doubles draws	(Egypt) Ola Abou Zekry (Ukraine) Kateryna Sliusar; 6–2, 6–2	(Greece) Eleni Kordolaimi (India) Eetee Maheta	(India) Nidhi Chilumula (Greece) Eleni Kordolaimi	(India) Sai Chamarthi (Portugal) Inês Murta (India) Pranjala Yadlapalli (India) Eetee Maheta
May 23	Ramat Gan, Israel; Hard $10,000; Singles and doubles draws	(Russia) Yuliya Kalabina; 7–5, 6–2	(Russia) Marta Paigina	(Kazakhstan) Gozal Ainitdinova (Romania) Daiana Negreanu	(Montenegro) Ana Veselinović (Belgium) Mathilde Devits (France) Jennifer Zerbone (Israel) Shiran Arol Wiegand
May 23	Ramat Gan, Israel; Hard $10,000; Singles and doubles draws	(Hungary) Naomi Totka (Montenegro) Ana Veselinović; 2–6, 6–3, [10–6]	(Israel) Shelly Krolitzky (Israel) Alona Pushkarevsky	(Kazakhstan) Gozal Ainitdinova (Romania) Daiana Negreanu	(Montenegro) Ana Veselinović (Belgium) Mathilde Devits (France) Jennifer Zerbone (Israel) Shiran Arol Wiegand
May 23	Warsaw, Poland; Clay $10,000; Singles and doubles draws	(United States) Sabrina Santamaria; 6–1, 6–4	(Italy) Deborah Chiesa	(Ukraine) Anastasiya Fedoryshyn (Poland) Katarzyna Kubicz	(Poland) Ania Hertel (Sweden) Jacqueline Cabaj Awad (Poland) Weronika Jaśmina Foryś (Philippines) Katharina Lehnert
May 23	Warsaw, Poland; Clay $10,000; Singles and doubles draws	(Finland) Emma Laine (United States) Sabrina Santamaria; 7–6^{(8–6)}, 6–0	(Sweden) Jacqueline Cabaj Awad (Italy) Deborah Chiesa	(Ukraine) Anastasiya Fedoryshyn (Poland) Katarzyna Kubicz	(Poland) Ania Hertel (Sweden) Jacqueline Cabaj Awad (Poland) Weronika Jaśmina Foryś (Philippines) Katharina Lehnert
May 23	Galați, Romania; Clay $10,000; Singles and doubles draws	(Romania) Miriam Bulgaru; 6–3, 6–1	(Romania) Oana Georgeta Simion	(Romania) Cristina Ene (Argentina) Guadalupe Pérez Rojas	(Australia) Angelique Svinos (Romania) Elena-Teodora Cadar (Czech Republic) Kateřina Kramperová (Italy) Anna Remondina
May 23	Galați, Romania; Clay $10,000; Singles and doubles draws	(Moldova) Alexandra Perper (Moldova) Anastasia Vdovenco; 6–3, 6–3	(Brazil) Maria Fernanda Alves (Argentina) Guadalupe Pérez Rojas	(Romania) Cristina Ene (Argentina) Guadalupe Pérez Rojas	(Australia) Angelique Svinos (Romania) Elena-Teodora Cadar (Czech Republic) Kateřina Kramperová (Italy) Anna Remondina
May 23	La Bisbal d'Empordà, Spain; Clay $10,000; Singles and doubles draws	(Mexico) Renata Zarazúa; 6–7^{(3–7)}, 6–1, 6–4	(Spain) Irene Burillo Escorihuela	(Spain) Ariadna Martí Riembau (Ukraine) Oleksandra Korashvili	(Spain) María Gutiérrez Carrasco (Australia) Naiktha Bains (Spain) María Martínez Martínez (Belgium) Klaartje Liebens
May 23	La Bisbal d'Empordà, Spain; Clay $10,000; Singles and doubles draws	(Spain) Irene Burillo Escorihuela (Russia) Ksenija Sharifova; 7–5, 6–4	(Serbia) Anđela Novčić (Italy) Natasha Piludu	(Spain) Ariadna Martí Riembau (Ukraine) Oleksandra Korashvili	(Spain) María Gutiérrez Carrasco (Australia) Naiktha Bains (Spain) María Martínez Martínez (Belgium) Klaartje Liebens
May 23	Hammamet, Tunisia; Clay $10,000; Singles and doubles draws	(Serbia) Natalija Kostić; 6–2, 4–6, 7–5	(France) Jade Suvrijn	(Ukraine) Ganna Poznikhirenko (Romania) Michele Zmău	(United Kingdom) Francesca Jones (Russia) Varvara Flink (Austria) Karoline Kurz (Switzerland) Lisa Sabino
May 23	Hammamet, Tunisia; Clay $10,000; Singles and doubles draws	(Italy) Anna Procacci (Romania) Michele Zmău; 6–1, 2–6, [10–3]	(Belgium) Margaux Bovy (Belgium) Britt Geukens	(Ukraine) Ganna Poznikhirenko (Romania) Michele Zmău	(United Kingdom) Francesca Jones (Russia) Varvara Flink (Austria) Karoline Kurz (Switzerland) Lisa Sabino
May 23	Antalya, Turkey; Hard $10,000; Singles and doubles draws	(France) Elixane Lechemia; 6–3, 3–6, 6–4	(Colombia) Yuliana Lizarazo	(Turkey) Pemra Özgen (United Kingdom) Francesca Stephenson	(United Kingdom) Maia Lumsden (Czech Republic) Anna Slováková (Colombia) María Fernanda Herazo (United Kingdom) Suzy Larkin
May 23	Antalya, Turkey; Hard $10,000; Singles and doubles draws	(Bosnia and Herzegovina) Anita Husarić (Colombia) Yuliana Lizarazo; 4–6, 6–4, [10–3]	(United Kingdom) Francesca Stephenson (Netherlands) Erika Vogelsang	(Turkey) Pemra Özgen (United Kingdom) Francesca Stephenson	(United Kingdom) Maia Lumsden (Czech Republic) Anna Slováková (Colombia) María Fernanda Herazo (United Kingdom) Suzy Larkin
May 30	Open Féminin de Marseille; Marseille, France; Clay $100,000; Singles – Doubles	(Montenegro) Danka Kovinić; 6–2, 6–3	(Chinese Taipei) Hsieh Su-wei	(Spain) Lourdes Domínguez Lino (Spain) Lara Arruabarrena	(France) Fiona Ferro (Spain) Sílvia Soler Espinosa (China) Han Xinyun (Japan) Misa Eguchi
May 30	Open Féminin de Marseille; Marseille, France; Clay $100,000; Singles – Doubles	(Chinese Taipei) Hsieh Su-wei (United States) Nicole Melichar; 1–6, 6–3, [10–3]	(Slovakia) Jana Čepelová (Spain) Lourdes Domínguez Lino	(Spain) Lourdes Domínguez Lino (Spain) Lara Arruabarrena	(France) Fiona Ferro (Spain) Sílvia Soler Espinosa (China) Han Xinyun (Japan) Misa Eguchi
May 30	Internazionali Femminili di Brescia; Brescia, Italy; Clay $50,000; Singles – Doubles	(Italy) Karin Knapp; 6–1, 6–2	(Czech Republic) Jesika Malečková	(Sweden) Susanne Celik (Austria) Barbara Haas	(Bulgaria) Viktoriya Tomova (Switzerland) Romina Oprandi (Ukraine) Maryna Zanevska (Netherlands) Cindy Burger
May 30	Internazionali Femminili di Brescia; Brescia, Italy; Clay $50,000; Singles – Doubles	(Italy) Deborah Chiesa (Italy) Martina Colmegna; 6–3, 1–6, [12–10]	(Netherlands) Cindy Burger (Liechtenstein) Stephanie Vogt	(Sweden) Susanne Celik (Austria) Barbara Haas	(Bulgaria) Viktoriya Tomova (Switzerland) Romina Oprandi (Ukraine) Maryna Zanevska (Netherlands) Cindy Burger
May 30	Aegon Eastbourne Trophy; Eastbourne, United Kingdom; Grass $50,000; Singles – Doubles	(United States) Alison Riske; 4–6, 7–6^{(7–5)}, 6–3	(United Kingdom) Tara Moore	(Australia) Ashleigh Barty (France) Océane Dodin	(China) Wang Yafan (Austria) Tamira Paszek (Spain) Georgina García Pérez (Croatia) Donna Vekić
May 30	Aegon Eastbourne Trophy; Eastbourne, United Kingdom; Grass $50,000; Singles – Doubles	(China) Yang Zhaoxuan (China) Zhang Kailin; 7–6^{(7–5)}, 6–1	(United States) Asia Muhammad (United States) Maria Sanchez	(Australia) Ashleigh Barty (France) Océane Dodin	(China) Wang Yafan (Austria) Tamira Paszek (Spain) Georgina García Pérez (Croatia) Donna Vekić
May 30	Hódmezővásárhely, Hungary; Clay $25,000; Singles and doubles draws	(Slovenia) Tamara Zidanšek; 4–6, 6–2, 6–4	(Czech Republic) Karolína Muchová	(Ukraine) Sofiya Kovalets (Argentina) Nadia Podoroska	(Norway) Ulrikke Eikeri (North Macedonia) Lina Gjorcheska (Israel) Deniz Khazaniuk (Slovakia) Rebecca Šramková
May 30	Hódmezővásárhely, Hungary; Clay $25,000; Singles and doubles draws	(Brazil) Laura Pigossi (Argentina) Nadia Podoroska; 6–3, 6–0	(Romania) Irina Maria Bara (North Macedonia) Lina Gjorcheska	(Ukraine) Sofiya Kovalets (Argentina) Nadia Podoroska	(Norway) Ulrikke Eikeri (North Macedonia) Lina Gjorcheska (Israel) Deniz Khazaniuk (Slovakia) Rebecca Šramková
May 30	Namangan, Uzbekistan; Hard $25,000; Singles and doubles draws	(Czech Republic) Barbora Štefková; 7–5, 7–5	(Russia) Ksenia Lykina	(Russia) Victoria Kan (Russia) Olga Doroshina	(Uzbekistan) Nigina Abduraimova (Ukraine) Valeriya Strakhova (Uzbekistan) Sabina Sharipova (Russia) Anna Blinkova
May 30	Namangan, Uzbekistan; Hard $25,000; Singles and doubles draws	(Russia) Ksenia Lykina (Russia) Polina Monova; 3–6, 6–3, [10–5]	(Russia) Veronika Kudermetova (Slovakia) Tereza Mihalíková	(Russia) Victoria Kan (Russia) Olga Doroshina	(Uzbekistan) Nigina Abduraimova (Ukraine) Valeriya Strakhova (Uzbekistan) Sabina Sharipova (Russia) Anna Blinkova
May 30	Baku, Azerbaijan; Hard $10,000; Singles and doubles draws	(Singapore) Stefanie Tan; 6–1, 6–0	(Russia) Valeriya Zeleva	(Ukraine) Kateryna Popova (Russia) Valeriya Urzhumova	(Russia) Valeriya Yushchenko (Russia) Anastasia Nefedova (Belarus) Sadafmoh Tolibova (Serbia) Tamara Čurović
May 30	Baku, Azerbaijan; Hard $10,000; Singles and doubles draws	(Russia) Kseniia Bekker (Russia) Alina Silich; 6–3, 6–4	(Serbia) Tamara Čurović (Singapore) Stefanie Tan	(Ukraine) Kateryna Popova (Russia) Valeriya Urzhumova	(Russia) Valeriya Yushchenko (Russia) Anastasia Nefedova (Belarus) Sadafmoh Tolibova (Serbia) Tamara Čurović
May 30	Sharm el-Sheikh, Egypt; Hard $10,000; Singles and doubles draws	(Romania) Jaqueline Cristian; 6–4, 6–3	(Switzerland) Chiara Grimm	(China) Zhao Qianqian (Italy) Federica Prati	(Egypt) Ola Abou Zekry (India) Sai Chamarthi (Romania) Ana Bianca Mihăilă (Greece) Eleni Kordolaimi
May 30	Sharm el-Sheikh, Egypt; Hard $10,000; Singles and doubles draws	(India) Sai Chamarthi (China) Zhao Qianqian; 6–4, 6–0	(India) Shivika Burman (Russia) Anastasia Evgenyevna Nefedova	(China) Zhao Qianqian (Italy) Federica Prati	(Egypt) Ola Abou Zekry (India) Sai Chamarthi (Romania) Ana Bianca Mihăilă (Greece) Eleni Kordolaimi
May 30	Kiryat Shmona, Israel; Hard $10,000; Singles and doubles draws	(Russia) Marta Paigina; 6–3, 6–1	(Montenegro) Ana Veselinović	(Kazakhstan) Gozal Ainitdinova (Israel) Vlada Ekshibarova	(Hungary) Naomi Totka (Israel) Keren Shlomo (Belgium) Mathilde Devits (Israel) Avital Vulf
May 30	Kiryat Shmona, Israel; Hard $10,000; Singles and doubles draws	(Hungary) Naomi Totka (Montenegro) Ana Veselinović; 6–1, 1–6, [10–6]	(Israel) Vlada Ekshibarova (Israel) Keren Shlomo	(Kazakhstan) Gozal Ainitdinova (Israel) Vlada Ekshibarova	(Hungary) Naomi Totka (Israel) Keren Shlomo (Belgium) Mathilde Devits (Israel) Avital Vulf
May 30	Szczawno-Zdrój, Poland; Clay $10,000; Singles and doubles draws	(Ukraine) Anastasiya Shoshyna; 6–3, 4–6, 6–4	(Belgium) Hélène Scholsen	(Philippines) Katharina Lehnert (Poland) Justyna Jegiołka	(India) Riya Bhatia (Ukraine) Nadiya Kolb (Slovakia) Sandra Jamrichová (Georgia (country)) Sofia Kvatsabaia
May 30	Szczawno-Zdrój, Poland; Clay $10,000; Singles and doubles draws	(Poland) Olga Brózda (Ukraine) Anastasiya Shoshyna; 6–2, 7–6^{(7–4)}	(Ukraine) Maryna Kolb (Ukraine) Nadiya Kolb	(Philippines) Katharina Lehnert (Poland) Justyna Jegiołka	(India) Riya Bhatia (Ukraine) Nadiya Kolb (Slovakia) Sandra Jamrichová (Georgia (country)) Sofia Kvatsabaia
May 30	Galați, Romania; Clay $10,000; Singles and doubles draws	(Moldova) Alexandra Perper; 6–2, 7–6^{(7–4)}	(Romania) Irina Fetecău	(Romania) Cristina Adamescu (Romania) Oana Georgeta Simion	(Chinese Taipei) Lee Yang (Romania) Ilona Georgiana Ghioroaie (Argentina) Guadalupe Pérez Rojas (Romania) Ioana Loredana Roșca
May 30	Galați, Romania; Clay $10,000; Singles and doubles draws	(Moldova) Alexandra Perper (Romania) Ioana Loredana Roșca; 6–3, 6–4	(Romania) Cristina Adamescu (Romania) Oana Georgeta Simion	(Romania) Cristina Adamescu (Romania) Oana Georgeta Simion	(Chinese Taipei) Lee Yang (Romania) Ilona Georgiana Ghioroaie (Argentina) Guadalupe Pérez Rojas (Romania) Ioana Loredana Roșca
May 30	Madrid, Spain; Clay $10,000; Singles and doubles draws	(Switzerland) Tess Sugnaux; 6–4, 7–5	(Norway) Melanie Stokke	(Russia) Ksenia Kuznetsova (Spain) María Gutiérrez Carrasco	(Switzerland) Daniela Vukovic (Italy) Federica Arcidiacono (France) Harmony Tan (Mexico) Renata Zarazúa
May 30	Madrid, Spain; Clay $10,000; Singles and doubles draws	(Mexico) Marcela Zacarías (Mexico) Renata Zarazúa; 6–4, 6–4	(Norway) Andrea Raaholt (Bosnia and Herzegovina) Jasmina Tinjić	(Russia) Ksenia Kuznetsova (Spain) María Gutiérrez Carrasco	(Switzerland) Daniela Vukovic (Italy) Federica Arcidiacono (France) Harmony Tan (Mexico) Renata Zarazúa
May 30	Hammamet, Tunisia; Clay $10,000; Singles and doubles draws	(Serbia) Natalija Kostić; 6–1, 6–0	(France) Jade Suvrijn	(Italy) Claudia Coppola (Germany) Julyette Steur	(Slovakia) Barbara Kötelesová (Austria) Kerstin Peckl (Belgium) Margaux Bovy (Sweden) Fanny Östlund
May 30	Hammamet, Tunisia; Clay $10,000; Singles and doubles draws	(France) Kassandra Davesne (Slovakia) Barbara Kötelesová; 3–6, 6–3, [10–8]	(Russia) Yulia Kulikova (Russia) Anna Makhorkina	(Italy) Claudia Coppola (Germany) Julyette Steur	(Slovakia) Barbara Kötelesová (Austria) Kerstin Peckl (Belgium) Margaux Bovy (Sweden) Fanny Östlund
May 30	Antalya, Turkey; Hard $10,000; Singles and doubles draws	(Turkey) Pemra Özgen; 7–5, 6–2	(France) Lou Brouleau	(Slovenia) Nastja Kolar (Slovakia) Zuzana Zlochová	(New Zealand) Joanna Carswell (Romania) Raluca Șerban (Bulgaria) Julia Stamatova (Australia) Abbie Myers
May 30	Antalya, Turkey; Hard $10,000; Singles and doubles draws	(France) Lou Brouleau (France) Emma Léné; 7–5, 6–3	(Slovenia) Nastja Kolar (United Kingdom) Francesca Stephenson	(Slovenia) Nastja Kolar (Slovakia) Zuzana Zlochová	(New Zealand) Joanna Carswell (Romania) Raluca Șerban (Bulgaria) Julia Stamatova (Australia) Abbie Myers
May 30	Buffalo, United States; Clay $10,000; Singles and doubles draws	(United States) Caroline Dolehide; 6–1, 7–5	(United States) Lauren Herring	(Russia) Angelina Zhuravleva (United States) Amy Zhu	(United States) Andie Daniell (United States) Alexa Graham (United States) Quinn Gleason (United States) Abigail Desiatnikov
May 30	Buffalo, United States; Clay $10,000; Singles and doubles draws	(United States) Caroline Dolehide (United States) Ingrid Neel; 5–7, 6–3, [10–6]	(United States) Sophie Chang (United States) Alexandra Mueller	(Russia) Angelina Zhuravleva (United States) Amy Zhu	(United States) Andie Daniell (United States) Alexa Graham (United States) Quinn Gleason (United States) Abigail Desiatnikov

=== June ===
Week of	Tournament	Winner	Runners-up	Semifinalists	Quarterfinalists
June 6	Bredeney Ladies Open; Essen, Germany; Clay $50,000; Singles – Doubles	(Spain) Sara Sorribes Tormo; 7–6^{(7–5)}, 6–4	(Czech Republic) Karolína Muchová	(Netherlands) Cindy Burger (Slovakia) Jana Čepelová	(Spain) Olga Sáez Larra (Greece) Maria Sakkari (Germany) Anne Schäfer (Germany) Carina Witthöft
June 6	Bredeney Ladies Open; Essen, Germany; Clay $50,000; Singles – Doubles	(Spain) Laura Pous Tió (Germany) Anne Schäfer; 6–2, 6–3	(Belgium) Elyne Boeykens (Romania) Elena Gabriela Ruse	(Netherlands) Cindy Burger (Slovakia) Jana Čepelová	(Spain) Olga Sáez Larra (Greece) Maria Sakkari (Germany) Anne Schäfer (Germany) Carina Witthöft
June 6	Aegon Surbiton Trophy; Surbiton, United Kingdom; Grass $50,000; Singles – Doubles	(Russia) Marina Melnikova; 6–3, 7–6^{(8–6)}	(France) Stéphanie Foretz	(Argentina) Catalina Pella (United States) Melanie Oudin	(United States) Robin Anderson (Bulgaria) Elitsa Kostova (Poland) Magdalena Fręch (United Kingdom) Samantha Murray
June 6	Aegon Surbiton Trophy; Surbiton, United Kingdom; Grass $50,000; Singles – Doubles	(United States) Sanaz Marand (United States) Melanie Oudin; 6–4, 7–5	(United States) Robin Anderson (Australia) Alison Bai	(Argentina) Catalina Pella (United States) Melanie Oudin	(United States) Robin Anderson (Bulgaria) Elitsa Kostova (Poland) Magdalena Fręch (United Kingdom) Samantha Murray
June 6	Minsk, Belarus; Clay $25,000; Singles and doubles draws	(Russia) Anna Kalinskaya; 6–4, 6–3	(Belarus) Vera Lapko	(Serbia) Vesna Dolonc (Russia) Varvara Flink	(Ukraine) Nadiia Kichenok (Belarus) Iryna Shymanovich (Norway) Ulrikke Eikeri (Ukraine) Olga Ianchuk
June 6	Minsk, Belarus; Clay $25,000; Singles and doubles draws	(Norway) Ulrikke Eikeri (Brazil) Laura Pigossi; 6–2, 6–4	(Belarus) Ilona Kremen (Belarus) Iryna Shymanovich	(Serbia) Vesna Dolonc (Russia) Varvara Flink	(Ukraine) Nadiia Kichenok (Belarus) Iryna Shymanovich (Norway) Ulrikke Eikeri (Ukraine) Olga Ianchuk
June 6	Padua, Italy; Clay $25,000; Singles and doubles draws	(China) Xu Shilin; 5–7, 6–4, 6–3	(Turkey) İpek Soylu	(Chile) Daniela Seguel (Slovenia) Tamara Zidanšek	(Belgium) Ysaline Bonaventure (Italy) Claudia Giovine (Estonia) Kaia Kanepi (Poland) Katarzyna Piter
June 6	Padua, Italy; Clay $25,000; Singles and doubles draws	(Italy) Alice Matteucci (Poland) Katarzyna Piter; 2–6, 7–6^{(7–1)}, [10–8]	(Romania) Cristina Dinu (North Macedonia) Lina Gjorcheska	(Chile) Daniela Seguel (Slovenia) Tamara Zidanšek	(Belgium) Ysaline Bonaventure (Italy) Claudia Giovine (Estonia) Kaia Kanepi (Poland) Katarzyna Piter
June 6	Tokyo Ariake Open; Tokyo, Japan; Hard $25,000; Singles and doubles draws	(Japan) Akiko Omae; 6–2, 6–1	(South Korea) Jang Su-jeong	(Japan) Junri Namigata (China) Lu Jingjing	(Japan) Mana Ayukawa (Thailand) Peangtarn Plipuech (Thailand) Nicha Lertpitaksinchai (Chinese Taipei) Hsu Ching-wen
June 6	Tokyo Ariake Open; Tokyo, Japan; Hard $25,000; Singles and doubles draws	(Japan) Kanae Hisami (Japan) Kotomi Takahata; 6–1, 6–4	(Australia) Lizette Cabrera (Japan) Miharu Imanishi	(Japan) Junri Namigata (China) Lu Jingjing	(Japan) Mana Ayukawa (Thailand) Peangtarn Plipuech (Thailand) Nicha Lertpitaksinchai (Chinese Taipei) Hsu Ching-wen
June 6	Buenos Aires, Argentina; Clay $10,000; Singles and doubles draws	(Argentina) Victoria Bosio; 6–0, 6–2	(Argentina) Martina Capurro Taborda	(Argentina) Julieta Estable (Argentina) Carla Lucero	(Argentina) Sofía Luini (Argentina) Melina Ferrero (Argentina) Sofía Blanco (Argentina) Daniela Farfán
June 6	Buenos Aires, Argentina; Clay $10,000; Singles and doubles draws	(Brazil) Carolina Alves (Paraguay) Camila Giangreco Campiz; 2–6, 6–2, [11–9]	(Argentina) Sofía Blanco (Argentina) Constanza Vega	(Argentina) Julieta Estable (Argentina) Carla Lucero	(Argentina) Sofía Luini (Argentina) Melina Ferrero (Argentina) Sofía Blanco (Argentina) Daniela Farfán
June 6	Baku, Azerbaijan; Hard $10,000; Singles and doubles draws	(Kazakhstan) Kamila Kerimbayeva; 6–3, 6–2	(Russia) Valeriya Zeleva	(Bulgaria) Ani Vangelova (Russia) Anzhelika Isaeva	(United States) Alexandra Riley (Russia) Ekaterina Kazionova (Russia) Valeriya Yushchenko (Australia) Alexandra Walters
June 6	Baku, Azerbaijan; Hard $10,000; Singles and doubles draws	(Kazakhstan) Kamila Kerimbayeva (Singapore) Stefanie Tan; 6–2, 6–3	(Ukraine) Katya Malikova (Ukraine) Angelina Shakhraychuk	(Bulgaria) Ani Vangelova (Russia) Anzhelika Isaeva	(United States) Alexandra Riley (Russia) Ekaterina Kazionova (Russia) Valeriya Yushchenko (Australia) Alexandra Walters
June 6	Anning, China; Clay $10,000; Singles and doubles draws	(China) Kang Jiaqi; 6–3, 6–2	(China) Sun Xuliu	(China) Zhao Di (China) Lu Jiaxi	(United States) Jessica Wacnik (China) Yang Yidi (China) Feng Shuo (China) Guo Hanyu
June 6	Anning, China; Clay $10,000; Singles and doubles draws	(China) Li Yihong (China) Xin Yuan; 5–7, 6–4, [10–8]	(China) Kang Jiaqi (China) Sun Xuliu	(China) Zhao Di (China) Lu Jiaxi	(United States) Jessica Wacnik (China) Yang Yidi (China) Feng Shuo (China) Guo Hanyu
June 6	Sharm el-Sheikh, Egypt; Hard $10,000; Singles and doubles draws	(Romania) Jaqueline Cristian; 6–1, 6–2	(China) Zhao Qianqian	(Canada) Petra Januskova (Sweden) Brenda Njuki	(Thailand) Varunya Wongteanchai (Germany) Jasmin Jebawy (India) Sri Peddi Reddy (Nigeria) Melissa Ifidzhen
June 6	Sharm el-Sheikh, Egypt; Hard $10,000; Singles and doubles draws	(India) Shivika Burman (Thailand) Varunya Wongteanchai; 6–3, 6–4	(United Kingdom) Sabrina Bamburac (Sweden) Brenda Njuki	(Canada) Petra Januskova (Sweden) Brenda Njuki	(Thailand) Varunya Wongteanchai (Germany) Jasmin Jebawy (India) Sri Peddi Reddy (Nigeria) Melissa Ifidzhen
June 6	Réunion, France; Hard $10,000; Singles and doubles draws	(Netherlands) Chayenne Ewijk; 1–6, 6–4, 6–2	(France) Estelle Cascino	(India) Snehadevi Reddy (France) Pauline Payet	(France) Fiona Codino (India) Kyra Shroff (France) Emmanuelle Girard (France) Eléonore Barrère
June 6	Réunion, France; Hard $10,000; Singles and doubles draws	(France) Pauline Payet (India) Snehadevi Reddy; 6–4, 2–6, [10–6]	(India) Kyra Shroff (India) Dhruthi Tatachar Venugopal	(India) Snehadevi Reddy (France) Pauline Payet	(France) Fiona Codino (India) Kyra Shroff (France) Emmanuelle Girard (France) Eléonore Barrère
June 6	Acre, Israel; Hard $10,000; Singles and doubles draws	(Israel) Vlada Ekshibarova; 6–3, 6–4	(Russia) Marta Paigina	(Israel) Keren Shlomo (Montenegro) Ana Veselinović	(Hungary) Naomi Totka (Israel) Nicole Khirin (Israel) Valeria Nikolaev (France) Victoria Muntean
June 6	Acre, Israel; Hard $10,000; Singles and doubles draws	(Israel) Vlada Ekshibarova (Hungary) Naomi Totka; 6–0, 3–6, [10–6]	(Germany) Christina Shakovets (Ukraine) Veronika Stotyka	(Israel) Keren Shlomo (Montenegro) Ana Veselinović	(Hungary) Naomi Totka (Israel) Nicole Khirin (Israel) Valeria Nikolaev (France) Victoria Muntean
June 6	Puszczykowo, Poland; Hard $10,000; Singles and doubles draws	(Czech Republic) Marie Bouzková; 6–2, 6–0	(Russia) Valeria Savinykh	(United States) Nicole Coopersmith (Poland) Katarzyna Kawa	(Finland) Piia Suomalainen (Poland) Katarzyna Kubicz (Ukraine) Anastasiya Shoshyna (Czech Republic) Anna Slováková
June 6	Puszczykowo, Poland; Hard $10,000; Singles and doubles draws	(Poland) Weronika Foryś (Russia) Valeria Savinykh; 7–6^{(7–4)}, 6–4	(Poland) Olga Brózda (Poland) Katarzyna Kawa	(United States) Nicole Coopersmith (Poland) Katarzyna Kawa	(Finland) Piia Suomalainen (Poland) Katarzyna Kubicz (Ukraine) Anastasiya Shoshyna (Czech Republic) Anna Slováková
June 6	Velenje, Slovenia; Clay $10,000; Singles and doubles draws	(Czech Republic) Gabriela Pantůčková; 4–6, 6–2, 6–0	(Slovenia) Kaja Juvan	(Hungary) Anna Bondár (Belgium) Kimberley Zimmermann	(Slovenia) Manca Pislak (Slovakia) Laura Svatíková (Belgium) Déborah Kerfs (Hungary) Rebeka Stolmár
June 6	Velenje, Slovenia; Clay $10,000; Singles and doubles draws	(Czech Republic) Gabriela Pantůčková (Czech Republic) Magdaléna Pantůčková; 4–6, 7–6^{(7–0)}, [13–11]	(Slovenia) Manca Pislak (Slovenia) Polona Reberšak	(Hungary) Anna Bondár (Belgium) Kimberley Zimmermann	(Slovenia) Manca Pislak (Slovakia) Laura Svatíková (Belgium) Déborah Kerfs (Hungary) Rebeka Stolmár
June 6	Madrid, Spain; Clay $10,000; Singles and doubles draws	(France) Margot Yerolymos; 6–3, 4–6, 6–3	(Switzerland) Tess Sugnaux	(France) Jessika Ponchet (Spain) Miriam Civera Lima	(Spain) Ángela Fita Boluda (Italy) Natasha Piludu (Spain) Lucía Marzal Martínez (Russia) Marina Shamayko
June 6	Madrid, Spain; Clay $10,000; Singles and doubles draws	(France) Jessika Ponchet (Russia) Marina Shamayko; 6–2, 6–3	(Spain) Ainhoa Atucha Gómez (Spain) María José Luque Moreno	(France) Jessika Ponchet (Spain) Miriam Civera Lima	(Spain) Ángela Fita Boluda (Italy) Natasha Piludu (Spain) Lucía Marzal Martínez (Russia) Marina Shamayko
June 6	Antalya, Turkey; Hard $10,000; Singles and doubles draws	(Slovakia) Zuzana Zlochová; 3–6, 6–2, 3–0, ret.	(Slovenia) Nastja Kolar	(France) Lou Brouleau (United Kingdom) Mirabelle Njoze	(Bulgaria) Petia Arshinkova (Bulgaria) Julia Stamatova (Russia) Margarita Lazareva (United Kingdom) Suzy Larkin
June 6	Antalya, Turkey; Hard $10,000; Singles and doubles draws	(Australia) Masa Jovanovic (Netherlands) Phillis Vanenburg; Walkover	(Slovenia) Nastja Kolar (United Kingdom) Francesca Stephenson	(France) Lou Brouleau (United Kingdom) Mirabelle Njoze	(Bulgaria) Petia Arshinkova (Bulgaria) Julia Stamatova (Russia) Margarita Lazareva (United Kingdom) Suzy Larkin
June 6	Bethany Beach, United States; Hard $10,000; Singles and doubles draws	(United States) Ingrid Neel; 6–3, 6–3	(United States) Alexandra Mueller	(United States) Abigail Desiatnikov (United States) Ashley Kratzer	(United States) Whitney Osuigwe (United States) Christina Rosca (United States) Sophie Chang (United States) Lindsay Lee-Waters
June 6	Bethany Beach, United States; Hard $10,000; Singles and doubles draws	(United States) Sophie Chang (United States) Alexandra Mueller; 6–1, 6–4	(Russia) Veronica Miroshnichenko (United States) Sofia Sewing	(United States) Abigail Desiatnikov (United States) Ashley Kratzer	(United States) Whitney Osuigwe (United States) Christina Rosca (United States) Sophie Chang (United States) Lindsay Lee-Waters
June 13	Naturtex Women's Open; Szeged, Hungary; Clay $50,000; Singles – Doubles	(Bulgaria) Viktoriya Tomova; 4–6, 6–0, 6–4	(Greece) Maria Sakkari	(Belgium) Ysaline Bonaventure (Hungary) Réka Luca Jani	(Slovenia) Tamara Zidanšek (Hungary) Dalma Gálfi (Czech Republic) Jesika Malečková (Russia) Ekaterina Alexandrova
June 13	Naturtex Women's Open; Szeged, Hungary; Clay $50,000; Singles – Doubles	(Romania) Cristina Dinu (North Macedonia) Lina Gjorcheska; 4–6, 6–4, [10–4]	(Poland) Justyna Jegiołka (Argentina) Guadalupe Pérez Rojas	(Belgium) Ysaline Bonaventure (Hungary) Réka Luca Jani	(Slovenia) Tamara Zidanšek (Hungary) Dalma Gálfi (Czech Republic) Jesika Malečková (Russia) Ekaterina Alexandrova
June 13	Aegon Ilkley Trophy; Ilkley, United Kingdom; Grass $50,000; Singles – Doubles	(Russia) Evgeniya Rodina; 6–4, 6–4	(Slovakia) Rebecca Šramková	(Portugal) Michelle Larcher de Brito (Japan) Mayo Hibi	(China) Duan Yingying (Chinese Taipei) Chang Kai-chen (France) Amandine Hesse (Netherlands) Richèl Hogenkamp
June 13	Aegon Ilkley Trophy; Ilkley, United Kingdom; Grass $50,000; Singles – Doubles	(China) Yang Zhaoxuan (China) Zhang Kailin; 6–3, 7–6^{(7–5)}	(Belgium) An-Sophie Mestach (Australia) Storm Sanders	(Portugal) Michelle Larcher de Brito (Japan) Mayo Hibi	(China) Duan Yingying (Chinese Taipei) Chang Kai-chen (France) Amandine Hesse (Netherlands) Richèl Hogenkamp
June 13	Minsk, Belarus; Clay $25,000; Singles and doubles draws	(Greece) Valentini Grammatikopoulou; 6–3, 4–1, ret.	(Russia) Anna Kalinskaya	(Belarus) Aryna Sabalenka (Belarus) Iryna Shymanovich	(Ukraine) Olga Ianchuk (Russia) Polina Vinogradova (Slovakia) Vivien Juhászová (Belarus) Vera Lapko
June 13	Minsk, Belarus; Clay $25,000; Singles and doubles draws	(Greece) Valentini Grammatikopoulou (Russia) Anna Kalinskaya; 4–6, 6–1, [10–2]	(Norway) Ulrikke Eikeri (Brazil) Laura Pigossi	(Belarus) Aryna Sabalenka (Belarus) Iryna Shymanovich	(Ukraine) Olga Ianchuk (Russia) Polina Vinogradova (Slovakia) Vivien Juhászová (Belarus) Vera Lapko
June 13	Open Montpellier Méditerranée Métropole Hérault; Montpellier, France; Clay $25,000+H; Singles and doubles draws	(Switzerland) Jil Teichmann; 6–2, 7–6^{(8–6)}	(Paraguay) Montserrat González	(Switzerland) Conny Perrin (France) Elixane Lechemia	(Italy) Corinna Dentoni (France) Jade Suvrijn (France) Margot Yerolymos (France) Léa Romain
June 13	Open Montpellier Méditerranée Métropole Hérault; Montpellier, France; Clay $25,000+H; Singles and doubles draws	(India) Prarthana Thombare (Netherlands) Eva Wacanno; 7–5, 2–6, [11–9]	(Spain) Lourdes Domínguez Lino (Switzerland) Jil Teichmann	(Switzerland) Conny Perrin (France) Elixane Lechemia	(Italy) Corinna Dentoni (France) Jade Suvrijn (France) Margot Yerolymos (France) Léa Romain
June 13	Braunschweig, Germany; Clay $25,000; Singles and doubles draws	(Serbia) Nina Stojanović; 6–4, 6–3	(Georgia (country)) Ekaterine Gorgodze	(Germany) Anne Schäfer (China) Xu Shilin	(Austria) Julia Grabher (Germany) Tamara Korpatsch (Czech Republic) Marie Bouzková (Switzerland) Patty Schnyder
June 13	Braunschweig, Germany; Clay $25,000; Singles and doubles draws	(Germany) Katharina Gerlach (Germany) Katharina Hobgarski; 6–4, 6–3	(Bosnia and Herzegovina) Anita Husarić (Serbia) Nina Stojanović	(Germany) Anne Schäfer (China) Xu Shilin	(Austria) Julia Grabher (Germany) Tamara Korpatsch (Czech Republic) Marie Bouzková (Switzerland) Patty Schnyder
June 13	Sumter, United States; Hard $25,000; Singles and doubles draws	(United States) CiCi Bellis; 6–1, 6–3	(Russia) Valeria Solovyeva	(United States) Francesca Di Lorenzo (United States) Caroline Dolehide	(United States) Jennifer Elie (Canada) Carol Zhao (Mexico) Renata Zarazúa (United States) Nicole Frenkel
June 13	Sumter, United States; Hard $25,000; Singles and doubles draws	(United States) Ashley Weinhold (United States) Caitlin Whoriskey; 7–6^{(7–5)}, 6–1	(United States) Jamie Loeb (Canada) Carol Zhao	(United States) Francesca Di Lorenzo (United States) Caroline Dolehide	(United States) Jennifer Elie (Canada) Carol Zhao (Mexico) Renata Zarazúa (United States) Nicole Frenkel
June 13	Fergana Challenger; Fergana, Uzbekistan; Hard $25,000; Singles and doubles draws	(Russia) Polina Monova; 6–3, 0–6, 6–4	(Uzbekistan) Sabina Sharipova	(Kazakhstan) Gozal Ainitdinova (Russia) Ksenia Lykina	(India) Ankita Raina (China) Gao Xinyu (China) You Xiaodi (Russia) Natela Dzalamidze
June 13	Fergana Challenger; Fergana, Uzbekistan; Hard $25,000; Singles and doubles draws	(Russia) Polina Monova (Russia) Yana Sizikova; 7–6^{(7–0)}, 6–2	(India) Prerna Bhambri (India) Ankita Raina	(Kazakhstan) Gozal Ainitdinova (Russia) Ksenia Lykina	(India) Ankita Raina (China) Gao Xinyu (China) You Xiaodi (Russia) Natela Dzalamidze
June 13	Victoria, Canada; Hard (indoor) $10,000; Singles and doubles draws	(United States) Katharine Fahey; 6–2, 6–1	(United States) Jessica Failla	(United States) Alexa Graham (United States) Lorraine Guillermo	(Samoa) Steffi Carruthers (United States) Ines Vias (Australia) Nicole Hoynaski (Canada) Stacey Fung
June 13	Victoria, Canada; Hard (indoor) $10,000; Singles and doubles draws	(United States) Lorraine Guillermo (United States) Kristina Smith; 5–7, 6–1, [13–11]	(United States) Katharine Fahey (United States) Victoria Flores	(United States) Alexa Graham (United States) Lorraine Guillermo	(Samoa) Steffi Carruthers (United States) Ines Vias (Australia) Nicole Hoynaski (Canada) Stacey Fung
June 13	Anning, China; Clay $10,000; Singles and doubles draws	(China) Xun Fangying; 6–3, 6–1	(China) Kang Jiaqi	(China) Wang Xiyu (China) Wei Zhanlan	(India) Sowjanya Bavisetti (China) Feng Shuo (China) Zhao Di (China) Sun Xuliu
June 13	Anning, China; Clay $10,000; Singles and doubles draws	(China) Chen Jiahui (China) Xin Yuan; 6–4, 7–6^{(7–3)}	(China) Kang Jiaqi (China) Sun Xuliu	(China) Wang Xiyu (China) Wei Zhanlan	(India) Sowjanya Bavisetti (China) Feng Shuo (China) Zhao Di (China) Sun Xuliu
June 13	Přerov, Czech Republic; Clay $10,000; Singles and doubles draws	(Slovakia) Lenka Juríková; 6–2, 6–4	(Ukraine) Anastasia Zarytska	(Czech Republic) Monika Kilnarová (Slovakia) Jana Jablonovská	(Czech Republic) Gabriela Pantůčková (Czech Republic) Magdaléna Pantůčková (Czech Republic) Petra Krejsová (Poland) Patrycja Polańska
June 13	Přerov, Czech Republic; Clay $10,000; Singles and doubles draws	(Slovakia) Jana Jablonovská (Czech Republic) Vendula Žovincová; 6–2, 7–6^{(7–4)}	(Czech Republic) Kristýna Hrabalová (Czech Republic) Nikola Tomanová	(Czech Republic) Monika Kilnarová (Slovakia) Jana Jablonovská	(Czech Republic) Gabriela Pantůčková (Czech Republic) Magdaléna Pantůčková (Czech Republic) Petra Krejsová (Poland) Patrycja Polańska
June 13	Sharm el-Sheikh, Egypt; Hard $10,000; Singles and doubles draws	(Romania) Jaqueline Cristian; 7–5, 6–4	(Croatia) Ana Savić	(Romania) Ana Bianca Mihăilă (Thailand) Varunya Wongteanchai	(Egypt) Ola Abou Zekry (Kazakhstan) Alexandra Grinchishina (Canada) Petra Januskova (China) Zhao Xiaoxi
June 13	Sharm el-Sheikh, Egypt; Hard $10,000; Singles and doubles draws	(Romania) Ana Bianca Mihăilă (China) Zhao Qianqian; 7–5, 7–5	(Nigeria) Melissa Ifidzhen (Canada) Petra Januskova	(Romania) Ana Bianca Mihăilă (Thailand) Varunya Wongteanchai	(Egypt) Ola Abou Zekry (Kazakhstan) Alexandra Grinchishina (Canada) Petra Januskova (China) Zhao Xiaoxi
June 13	Sassuolo, Italy; Clay $10,000; Singles and doubles draws	(Italy) Jessica Pieri; 6–2, 6–3	(Italy) Martina Spigarelli	(Italy) Anastasia Grymalska (Italy) Lucia Bronzetti	(Italy) Federica Bilardo (Italy) Alice Balducci (Switzerland) Susan Bandecchi (Italy) Anna Remondina
June 13	Sassuolo, Italy; Clay $10,000; Singles and doubles draws	(Italy) Alice Balducci (Italy) Deborah Chiesa; 6–4, 6–2	(Italy) Tatiana Pieri (Italy) Lucrezia Stefanini	(Italy) Anastasia Grymalska (Italy) Lucia Bronzetti	(Italy) Federica Bilardo (Italy) Alice Balducci (Switzerland) Susan Bandecchi (Italy) Anna Remondina
June 13	Grand-Baie, Mauritius; Hard $10,000; Singles and doubles draws	(India) Snehadevi Reddy; 6–4, 4–6, 6–3	(Zimbabwe) Valeria Bhunu	(Netherlands) Chayenne Ewijk (France) Estelle Cascino	(France) Fiona Codino (India) Kyra Shroff (India) Dhruthi Tatachar Venugopal (France) Pauline Payet
June 13	Grand-Baie, Mauritius; Hard $10,000; Singles and doubles draws	(India) Kyra Shroff (India) Dhruthi Tatachar Venugopal; 6–1, 6–1	(Netherlands) Chayenne Ewijk (Netherlands) Rosalie van der Hoek	(Netherlands) Chayenne Ewijk (France) Estelle Cascino	(France) Fiona Codino (India) Kyra Shroff (India) Dhruthi Tatachar Venugopal (France) Pauline Payet
June 13	Alkmaar, Netherlands; Clay $10,000; Singles and doubles draws	(Belgium) Elyne Boeykens; 6–3, 7–5	(Germany) Katharina Hering	(Belgium) Eliessa Vanlangendonck (Australia) Abbie Myers	(Netherlands) Dominique Karregat (Netherlands) Kelly Versteeg (Germany) Caroline Werner (South Africa) Chanel Simmonds
June 13	Alkmaar, Netherlands; Clay $10,000; Singles and doubles draws	(Germany) Luisa Marie Huber (Belgium) Hélène Scholsen; Walkover	(Ecuador) Charlotte Römer (Germany) Caroline Werner	(Belgium) Eliessa Vanlangendonck (Australia) Abbie Myers	(Netherlands) Dominique Karregat (Netherlands) Kelly Versteeg (Germany) Caroline Werner (South Africa) Chanel Simmonds
June 13	Oeiras, Portugal; Clay $10,000; Singles and doubles draws	(Italy) Angelica Moratelli; 6–4, 6–2	(Argentina) Victoria Bosio	(Brazil) Carolina Alves (United States) Nicole Coopersmith	(France) Laëtitia Sarrazin (Portugal) Inês Mesquita (Spain) Ainhoa Atucha Gómez (Russia) Marina Shamayko
June 13	Oeiras, Portugal; Clay $10,000; Singles and doubles draws	(Cambodia) Andrea Ka (France) Laëtitia Sarrazin; 4–6, 7–5, [10–3]	(Brazil) Carolina Alves (Argentina) Victoria Bosio	(Brazil) Carolina Alves (United States) Nicole Coopersmith	(France) Laëtitia Sarrazin (Portugal) Inês Mesquita (Spain) Ainhoa Atucha Gómez (Russia) Marina Shamayko
June 13	Infond Open; Maribor, Slovenia; Clay $10,000; Singles and doubles draws	(Ukraine) Marianna Zakarlyuk; 3–6, 7–5, 6–3	(Slovenia) Nina Potočnik	(Slovenia) Manca Pislak (Czech Republic) Gabriela Horáčková	(Slovakia) Kristína Schmiedlová (Slovenia) Eva Zagorac (Slovenia) Saša Klaneček (Sweden) Cornelia Lister
June 13	Infond Open; Maribor, Slovenia; Clay $10,000; Singles and doubles draws	(Slovenia) Nastja Kolar (United Kingdom) Francesca Stephenson; 5–7, 6–0, [10–3]	(Slovenia) Polona Reberšak (Romania) Gabriela Talabă	(Slovenia) Manca Pislak (Czech Republic) Gabriela Horáčková	(Slovakia) Kristína Schmiedlová (Slovenia) Eva Zagorac (Slovenia) Saša Klaneček (Sweden) Cornelia Lister
June 13	Kaohsiung, Taiwan; Hard $10,000; Singles and doubles draws	(Chinese Taipei) Lee Hua-chen; 6–7^{(4–7)}, 6–0, 6–0	(Thailand) Peangtarn Plipuech	(Japan) Miharu Imanishi (Japan) Mizuno Kijima	(Japan) Risa Ushijima (Japan) Miki Miyamura (Japan) Mai Minokoshi (Hong Kong) Katherine Ip
June 13	Kaohsiung, Taiwan; Hard $10,000; Singles and doubles draws	(Japan) Erina Hayashi (Japan) Haruka Kaji; 6–4, 3–6, [10–7]	(Chinese Taipei) Chen Pei-hsuan (Chinese Taipei) Wu Fang-hsien	(Japan) Miharu Imanishi (Japan) Mizuno Kijima	(Japan) Risa Ushijima (Japan) Miki Miyamura (Japan) Mai Minokoshi (Hong Kong) Katherine Ip
June 13	Antalya, Turkey; Hard $10,000; Singles and doubles draws	(Turkey) Ayla Aksu; 6–3, 6–3	(Romania) Raluca Șerban	(Italy) Miriana Tona (Slovakia) Zuzana Zlochová	(Netherlands) Phillis Vanenburg (Netherlands) Arianne Hartono (Switzerland) Imane Kocher (Switzerland) Leonie Küng
June 13	Antalya, Turkey; Hard $10,000; Singles and doubles draws	(Netherlands) Arianne Hartono (New Zealand) Paige Mary Hourigan; 6–3, ret.	(Romania) Raluca Șerban (Italy) Miriana Tona	(Italy) Miriana Tona (Slovakia) Zuzana Zlochová	(Netherlands) Phillis Vanenburg (Netherlands) Arianne Hartono (Switzerland) Imane Kocher (Switzerland) Leonie Küng
June 20	Périgueux, France; Clay $25,000; Singles and doubles draws	(Switzerland) Jil Teichmann; 6–3, 6–3	(Spain) Olga Sáez Larra	(Mexico) Victoria Rodríguez (France) Elixane Lechemia	(France) Lou Brouleau (Italy) Anastasia Grymalska (Romania) Daiana Negreanu (Ukraine) Sofiya Kovalets
June 20	Périgueux, France; Clay $25,000; Singles and doubles draws	(Switzerland) Conny Perrin (Slovakia) Chantal Škamlová; 6–3, 3–6, [10–7]	(Argentina) Julieta Estable (Argentina) Guadalupe Pérez Rojas	(Mexico) Victoria Rodríguez (France) Elixane Lechemia	(France) Lou Brouleau (Italy) Anastasia Grymalska (Romania) Daiana Negreanu (Ukraine) Sofiya Kovalets
June 20	Rome, Italy; Clay $25,000; Singles and doubles draws	(Slovakia) Rebecca Šramková; 6–1, 6–1	(Hungary) Réka Luca Jani	(Italy) Martina Colmegna (Georgia (country)) Sofia Shapatava	(Spain) Paula Badosa Gibert (Italy) Martina Di Giuseppe (Italy) Jasmine Paolini (Netherlands) Arantxa Rus
June 20	Rome, Italy; Clay $25,000; Singles and doubles draws	(Italy) Claudia Giovine (Poland) Katarzyna Piter; 6–3, 3–6, [10–7]	(Venezuela) Andrea Gámiz (Hungary) Réka Luca Jani	(Italy) Martina Colmegna (Georgia (country)) Sofia Shapatava	(Spain) Paula Badosa Gibert (Italy) Martina Di Giuseppe (Italy) Jasmine Paolini (Netherlands) Arantxa Rus
June 20	Moscow, Russia; Clay $25,000; Singles and doubles draws	(Russia) Anastasiya Komardina; 7–6^{(7–3)}, 4–6, 6–3	(Kazakhstan) Galina Voskoboeva	(Uzbekistan) Sabina Sharipova (Russia) Elena Rybakina	(Russia) Polina Vinogradova (Russia) Anna Kalinskaya (Ukraine) Ganna Poznikhirenko (Slovakia) Michaela Hončová
June 20	Moscow, Russia; Clay $25,000; Singles and doubles draws	(Russia) Natela Dzalamidze (Russia) Veronika Kudermetova; 6–1, 6–2	(Russia) Anna Morgina (Ukraine) Ganna Poznikhirenko	(Uzbekistan) Sabina Sharipova (Russia) Elena Rybakina	(Russia) Polina Vinogradova (Russia) Anna Kalinskaya (Ukraine) Ganna Poznikhirenko (Slovakia) Michaela Hončová
June 20	Ystad, Sweden; Clay $25,000; Singles and doubles draws	(Sweden) Susanne Celik; 6–1, 6–3	(Uzbekistan) Akgul Amanmuradova	(Serbia) Nina Stojanović (Poland) Magdalena Fręch	(Israel) Deniz Khazaniuk (Georgia (country)) Ekaterine Gorgodze (Denmark) Emilie Francati (Chile) Daniela Seguel
June 20	Ystad, Sweden; Clay $25,000; Singles and doubles draws	(Sweden) Cornelia Lister (Serbia) Nina Stojanović; 6–4, 6–2	(Bulgaria) Dia Evtimova (Austria) Pia König	(Serbia) Nina Stojanović (Poland) Magdalena Fręch	(Israel) Deniz Khazaniuk (Georgia (country)) Ekaterine Gorgodze (Denmark) Emilie Francati (Chile) Daniela Seguel
June 20	Lenzerheide, Switzerland; Clay $25,000; Singles and doubles draws	(Germany) Tamara Korpatsch; 4–6, 6–4, 6–2	(Slovenia) Dalila Jakupović	(Croatia) Nina Alibalić (Slovenia) Tadeja Majerič	(Belgium) Elyne Boeykens (Austria) Julia Grabher (Romania) Irina Maria Bara (Latvia) Diāna Marcinkēviča
June 20	Lenzerheide, Switzerland; Clay $25,000; Singles and doubles draws	(Slovenia) Tadeja Majerič (Bulgaria) Aleksandrina Naydenova; 7–5, 1–6, [10–8]	(Romania) Irina Maria Bara (Belgium) Elyne Boeykens	(Croatia) Nina Alibalić (Slovenia) Tadeja Majerič	(Belgium) Elyne Boeykens (Austria) Julia Grabher (Romania) Irina Maria Bara (Latvia) Diāna Marcinkēviča
June 20	Baton Rouge, United States; Hard $25,000; Singles and doubles draws	(Russia) Valeria Solovyeva; 5–7, 6–3, 6–0	(United States) Jennifer Elie	(Japan) Riko Sawayanagi (United States) Raveena Kingsley	(Canada) Françoise Abanda (Australia) Olivia Rogowska (United States) Jamie Loeb (United States) Caroline Dolehide
June 20	Baton Rouge, United States; Hard $25,000; Singles and doubles draws	(United States) Lauren Herring (Australia) Ellen Perez; 6–3, 6–3	(United States) Jamie Loeb (United States) Ingrid Neel	(Japan) Riko Sawayanagi (United States) Raveena Kingsley	(Canada) Françoise Abanda (Australia) Olivia Rogowska (United States) Jamie Loeb (United States) Caroline Dolehide
June 20	Nieuwpoort, Belgium; Clay $10,000; Singles and doubles draws	(Netherlands) Quirine Lemoine; 6–4, 6–3	(France) Margot Yerolymos	(Belgium) Morgane Michiels (Belgium) Britt Geukens	(Belgium) Steffi Distelmans (Netherlands) Nikki Luttikhuis (France) Harmony Tan (Italy) Alice Savoretti
June 20	Nieuwpoort, Belgium; Clay $10,000; Singles and doubles draws	(United Kingdom) Amanda Carreras (Italy) Alice Savoretti; 6–2, 6–7^{(4–7)}, [10–8]	(Belgium) Steffi Distelmans (Netherlands) Quirine Lemoine	(Belgium) Morgane Michiels (Belgium) Britt Geukens	(Belgium) Steffi Distelmans (Netherlands) Nikki Luttikhuis (France) Harmony Tan (Italy) Alice Savoretti
June 20	Anning, China; Clay $10,000; Singles and doubles draws	(China) Tang Haochen; 6–3, 2–6, 6–3	(China) Lu Jiaxi	(China) Wang Meiling (China) Wang Yujia	(China) Guo Hanyu (China) Yuan Yue (United States) Jessica Wacnik (China) Xun Fangying
June 20	Anning, China; Clay $10,000; Singles and doubles draws	(China) Guo Hanyu (China) Lu Jiaxi; 6–3, 6–4	(China) Sheng Yuqi (China) Xin Yuan	(China) Wang Meiling (China) Wang Yujia	(China) Guo Hanyu (China) Yuan Yue (United States) Jessica Wacnik (China) Xun Fangying
June 20	Sharm el-Sheikh, Egypt; Hard $10,000; Singles and doubles draws	(China) Zhao Xiaoxi; 7–6^{(8–6)}, 6–2	(Belgium) Greet Minnen	(Romania) Ioana Petroiu (Canada) Petra Januskova	(Germany) Lisa-Marie Mätschke (Hungary) Naomi Totka (Germany) Christina Shakovets (Croatia) Ana Savić
June 20	Sharm el-Sheikh, Egypt; Hard $10,000; Singles and doubles draws	(Romania) Ana Bianca Mihăilă (China) Zhao Xiaoxi; 2–6, 6–4, [10–7]	(Canada) Petra Januskova (Belgium) Greet Minnen	(Romania) Ioana Petroiu (Canada) Petra Januskova	(Germany) Lisa-Marie Mätschke (Hungary) Naomi Totka (Germany) Christina Shakovets (Croatia) Ana Savić
June 20	Kaltenkirchen, Germany; Clay $10,000; Singles and doubles draws	(Germany) Katharina Hobgarski; 6–3, 6–3	(Germany) Lisa Matviyenko	(Czech Republic) Vendula Žovincová (Belgium) Kimberley Zimmermann	(Philippines) Katharina Lehnert (Germany) Anna Klasen (Denmark) Anna Signe Rasmussen (Germany) Lena Greiner
June 20	Kaltenkirchen, Germany; Clay $10,000; Singles and doubles draws	(Germany) Katharina Hobgarski (Germany) Julia Wachaczyk; 6–4, 6–2	(Hungary) Bianka Békefi (Ecuador) Charlotte Römer	(Czech Republic) Vendula Žovincová (Belgium) Kimberley Zimmermann	(Philippines) Katharina Lehnert (Germany) Anna Klasen (Denmark) Anna Signe Rasmussen (Germany) Lena Greiner
June 20	Grand-Baie, Mauritius; Hard $10,000; Singles and doubles draws	(France) Estelle Cascino; 3–6, 6–1, 6–3	(India) Kyra Shroff	(Serbia) Vanja Klarić (India) Snehadevi Reddy	(Oman) Fatma Al-Nabhani (France) Pauline Payet (Netherlands) Chayenne Ewijk (France) Eléonore Barrère
June 20	Grand-Baie, Mauritius; Hard $10,000; Singles and doubles draws	(Netherlands) Chayenne Ewijk (Netherlands) Rosalie van der Hoek; 6–3, 6–3	(India) Kyra Shroff (India) Dhruthi Tatachar Venugopal	(Serbia) Vanja Klarić (India) Snehadevi Reddy	(Oman) Fatma Al-Nabhani (France) Pauline Payet (Netherlands) Chayenne Ewijk (France) Eléonore Barrère
June 20	Breda, Netherlands; Clay $10,000; Singles and doubles draws	(Germany) Vivian Heisen; 6–2, 6–1	(Netherlands) Kelly Versteeg	(Australia) Astra Sharma (Netherlands) Mandy Wagemaker	(Greece) Valentini Grammatikopoulou (Spain) Yvonne Cavallé Reimers (Brazil) Carolina Alves (Hungary) Vanda Lukács
June 20	Breda, Netherlands; Clay $10,000; Singles and doubles draws	(Greece) Valentini Grammatikopoulou (Belarus) Sviatlana Pirazhenka; 7–6^{(8–6)}, 6–4	(United States) Dasha Ivanova (Czech Republic) Petra Krejsová	(Australia) Astra Sharma (Netherlands) Mandy Wagemaker	(Greece) Valentini Grammatikopoulou (Spain) Yvonne Cavallé Reimers (Brazil) Carolina Alves (Hungary) Vanda Lukács
June 20	Cantanhede, Portugal; Carpet $10,000; Singles and doubles draws	(Republic of Ireland) Sinéad Lohan; 6–3, 7–5	(Argentina) Victoria Bosio	(United Kingdom) Sarah Beth Grey (Republic of Ireland) Jennifer Timotin	(United Kingdom) Eden Silva (Portugal) Joana Valle Costa (Spain) Ainhoa Atucha Gómez (Portugal) Inês Murta
June 20	Cantanhede, Portugal; Carpet $10,000; Singles and doubles draws	(Portugal) Francisca Jorge (Portugal) Marta Oliveira; 3–6, 6–3, [10–7]	(Portugal) Inês Murta (France) Laëtitia Sarrazin	(United Kingdom) Sarah Beth Grey (Republic of Ireland) Jennifer Timotin	(United Kingdom) Eden Silva (Portugal) Joana Valle Costa (Spain) Ainhoa Atucha Gómez (Portugal) Inês Murta
June 20	Maribor, Slovenia; Clay $10,000; Singles and doubles draws	(Serbia) Milana Spremo; 7–6^{(7–4)}, 0–6, 6–2	(Slovenia) Manca Pislak	(Czech Republic) Kateřina Kramperová (Croatia) Silvia Njirić	(Slovenia) Polona Reberšak (Hungary) Csilla Argyelán (Slovenia) Saša Klaneček (Romania) Gabriela Talabă
June 20	Maribor, Slovenia; Clay $10,000; Singles and doubles draws	(Slovenia) Sara Palčič (Slovenia) Nina Potočnik; 6–3, 6–2	(Slovenia) Manca Pislak (Slovenia) Polona Reberšak	(Czech Republic) Kateřina Kramperová (Croatia) Silvia Njirić	(Slovenia) Polona Reberšak (Hungary) Csilla Argyelán (Slovenia) Saša Klaneček (Romania) Gabriela Talabă
June 20	Sangju, South Korea; Hard $10,000; Singles and doubles draws	(United States) Hanna Chang; 6–2, 6–3	(South Korea) Choi Ji-hee	(China) Wang Yan (South Korea) Jeong Su-nam	(South Korea) Hong Seung-yeon (South Korea) Kim Da-bin (South Korea) Kim Se-hyun (China) Yang Zi
June 20	Sangju, South Korea; Hard $10,000; Singles and doubles draws	(South Korea) Kim Ju-eun (China) Ye Qiuyu; 7–5, 6–7^{(6–8)}, [10–6]	(South Korea) Han Sung-hee (China) Wang Yan	(China) Wang Yan (South Korea) Jeong Su-nam	(South Korea) Hong Seung-yeon (South Korea) Kim Da-bin (South Korea) Kim Se-hyun (China) Yang Zi
June 20	Kaohsiung, Taiwan; Hard $10,000; Singles and doubles draws	(China) Zhang Ying; 6–0, 7–6^{(7–5)}	(Japan) Erina Hayashi	(Japan) Mizuno Kijima (Chinese Taipei) Lee Pei-chi	(Chinese Taipei) Lee Hua-chen (Chinese Taipei) Cho I-hsuan (Japan) Ayano Shimizu (Chinese Taipei) Chen Pei-hsuan
June 20	Kaohsiung, Taiwan; Hard $10,000; Singles and doubles draws	(Chinese Taipei) Chien Pei-ju (Chinese Taipei) Lee Pei-chi; 7–5, 6–2	(Chinese Taipei) Cho I-hsuan (Chinese Taipei) Lee Hua-chen	(Japan) Mizuno Kijima (Chinese Taipei) Lee Pei-chi	(Chinese Taipei) Lee Hua-chen (Chinese Taipei) Cho I-hsuan (Japan) Ayano Shimizu (Chinese Taipei) Chen Pei-hsuan
June 20	Antalya, Turkey; Hard $10,000; Singles and doubles draws	(France) Jennifer Zerbone; 6–3, 5–7, 7–6^{(7–4)}	(Ukraine) Alyona Sotnikova	(Russia) Daria Lodikova (Turkey) Berfu Cengiz	(Turkey) Başak Eraydın (France) Clémence Fayol (Colombia) María Fernanda Herazo (New Zealand) Paige Mary Hourigan
June 20	Antalya, Turkey; Hard $10,000; Singles and doubles draws	(France) Caroline Roméo (Ukraine) Alyona Sotnikova; 6–3, 6–3	(Croatia) Mariana Dražić (Russia) Daria Lodikova	(Russia) Daria Lodikova (Turkey) Berfu Cengiz	(Turkey) Başak Eraydın (France) Clémence Fayol (Colombia) María Fernanda Herazo (New Zealand) Paige Mary Hourigan
June 27	Torneo Internazionale Femminile Antico Tiro a Volo; Rome, Italy; Clay $50,000; Singles – Doubles	(Spain) Sílvia Soler Espinosa; 2–6, 6–4, 7–5	(Spain) Laura Pous Tió	(Romania) Alexandra Cadanțu (Netherlands) Arantxa Rus	(Romania) Cristina Dinu (Poland) Katarzyna Piter (Italy) Nastassja Burnett (Italy) Anastasia Grymalska
June 27	Torneo Internazionale Femminile Antico Tiro a Volo; Rome, Italy; Clay $50,000; Singles – Doubles	(Turkey) İpek Soylu (China) Xu Shilin; 7–5, 6–1	(Hungary) Réka Luca Jani (Georgia (country)) Sofia Shapatava	(Romania) Alexandra Cadanțu (Netherlands) Arantxa Rus	(Romania) Cristina Dinu (Poland) Katarzyna Piter (Italy) Nastassja Burnett (Italy) Anastasia Grymalska
June 27	Open Engie Porte du Hainaut; Denain, France; Clay $25,000; Singles and doubles draws	(Argentina) Nadia Podoroska; 6–3, 5–7, 6–4	(France) Irina Ramialison	(United Kingdom) Amanda Carreras (Spain) Olga Sáez Larra	(France) Manon Arcangioli (France) Fiona Ferro (Belgium) Elyne Boeykens (Turkey) Pemra Özgen
June 27	Open Engie Porte du Hainaut; Denain, France; Clay $25,000; Singles and doubles draws	(Slovakia) Michaela Hončová (France) Shérazad Reix; 6–1, 6–3	(United Kingdom) Amanda Carreras (Italy) Alice Savoretti	(United Kingdom) Amanda Carreras (Spain) Olga Sáez Larra	(France) Manon Arcangioli (France) Fiona Ferro (Belgium) Elyne Boeykens (Turkey) Pemra Özgen
June 27	Stuttgart, Germany; Clay $25,000; Singles and doubles draws	(North Macedonia) Lina Gjorcheska; 6–2, 3–6, 6–4	(Slovenia) Dalila Jakupović	(Germany) Anna Zaja (Switzerland) Patty Schnyder	(Czech Republic) Jesika Malečková (Spain) Yvonne Cavallé Reimers (Germany) Laura Schaeder (Belgium) Marie Benoît
June 27	Stuttgart, Germany; Clay $25,000; Singles and doubles draws	(North Macedonia) Lina Gjorcheska (Argentina) Florencia Molinero; 1–6, 6–1, [10–7]	(Russia) Aminat Kushkhova (Czech Republic) Diana Šumová	(Germany) Anna Zaja (Switzerland) Patty Schnyder	(Czech Republic) Jesika Malečková (Spain) Yvonne Cavallé Reimers (Germany) Laura Schaeder (Belgium) Marie Benoît
June 27	Middelburg, Netherlands; Clay $25,000; Singles and doubles draws	(Netherlands) Quirine Lemoine; 6–2, 7–5	(Greece) Valentini Grammatikopoulou	(Netherlands) Bibiane Weijers (United States) Bernarda Pera	(Netherlands) Richèl Hogenkamp (Mexico) Ana Sofía Sánchez (Italy) Alice Matteucci (Belarus) Sviatlana Pirazhenka
June 27	Middelburg, Netherlands; Clay $25,000; Singles and doubles draws	(Netherlands) Quirine Lemoine (Netherlands) Eva Wacanno; 6–3, 7–5	(Greece) Valentini Grammatikopoulou (Germany) Julia Wachaczyk	(Netherlands) Bibiane Weijers (United States) Bernarda Pera	(Netherlands) Richèl Hogenkamp (Mexico) Ana Sofía Sánchez (Italy) Alice Matteucci (Belarus) Sviatlana Pirazhenka
June 27	Bella Cup; Toruń, Poland; Clay $25,000+H; Singles and doubles draws	(Bulgaria) Isabella Shinikova; 7–5, 4–6, 6–2	(Slovenia) Tadeja Majerič	(Romania) Irina Maria Bara (Spain) Paula Badosa Gibert	(Poland) Magdalena Fręch (Czech Republic) Marie Bouzková (Czech Republic) Gabriela Pantůčková (Czech Republic) Tereza Smitková
June 27	Bella Cup; Toruń, Poland; Clay $25,000+H; Singles and doubles draws	(Romania) Irina Maria Bara (Russia) Valeria Savinykh; 6–3, 4–6, [10–7]	(Uzbekistan) Akgul Amanmuradova (Russia) Valentyna Ivakhnenko	(Romania) Irina Maria Bara (Spain) Paula Badosa Gibert	(Poland) Magdalena Fręch (Czech Republic) Marie Bouzková (Czech Republic) Gabriela Pantůčková (Czech Republic) Tereza Smitková
June 27	Helsingborg, Sweden; Clay $25,000; Singles and doubles draws	(Sweden) Susanne Celik; 6–4, 6–2	(Chile) Daniela Seguel	(Lithuania) Joana Eidukonytė (Austria) Pia König	(China) Tian Ran (Serbia) Dejana Radanović (Sweden) Kajsa Rinaldo Persson (Liechtenstein) Kathinka von Deichmann
June 27	Helsingborg, Sweden; Clay $25,000; Singles and doubles draws	(China) Tian Ran (China) You Xiaodi; 6–4, 6–3	(Sweden) Cornelia Lister (Russia) Anna Morgina	(Lithuania) Joana Eidukonytė (Austria) Pia König	(China) Tian Ran (Serbia) Dejana Radanović (Sweden) Kajsa Rinaldo Persson (Liechtenstein) Kathinka von Deichmann
June 27	El Paso, United States; Hard $25,000; Singles and doubles draws	(United States) Jamie Loeb; 7–5, 6–3	(United States) Caitlin Whoriskey	(Russia) Valeria Solovyeva (South Africa) Chanel Simmonds	(Canada) Carol Zhao (United States) Jennifer Elie (United States) Ellie Halbauer (United States) Sanaz Marand
June 27	El Paso, United States; Hard $25,000; Singles and doubles draws	(United States) Ashley Weinhold (United States) Caitlin Whoriskey; 6–4, 7–6^{(7–3)}	(United States) Sanaz Marand (Canada) Carol Zhao	(Russia) Valeria Solovyeva (South Africa) Chanel Simmonds	(Canada) Carol Zhao (United States) Jennifer Elie (United States) Ellie Halbauer (United States) Sanaz Marand
June 27	Banja Luka, Bosnia and Herzegovina; Clay $10,000; Singles and doubles draws	(Slovakia) Viktória Kužmová; 6–0, 6–1	(Slovenia) Manca Pislak	(Hungary) Csilla Argyelán (Hungary) Bianka Békefi	(Slovenia) Nina Potočnik (Serbia) Milana Spremo (Czech Republic) Magdaléna Pantůčková (Czech Republic) Natálie Novotná
June 27	Banja Luka, Bosnia and Herzegovina; Clay $10,000; Singles and doubles draws	(Slovakia) Barbara Kötelesová (Slovenia) Manca Pislak; 6–7^{(5–7)}, 6–4, [10–5]	(Slovakia) Viktória Kužmová (Bulgaria) Julia Stamatova	(Hungary) Csilla Argyelán (Hungary) Bianka Békefi	(Slovenia) Nina Potočnik (Serbia) Milana Spremo (Czech Republic) Magdaléna Pantůčková (Czech Republic) Natálie Novotná
June 27	Sharm el-Sheikh, Egypt; Hard $10,000; Singles and doubles draws	(Belgium) Greet Minnen; 7–6^{(7–2)}, 6–2	(Romania) Ioana Pietroiu	(Russia) Margarita Lazareva (Greece) Eleni Kordolaimi	(Germany) Christina Shakovets (Romania) Ana Bianca Mihăilă (Egypt) Ola Abou Zekry (Canada) Petra Januskova
June 27	Sharm el-Sheikh, Egypt; Hard $10,000; Singles and doubles draws	(Egypt) Ola Abou Zekry (India) Sharmada Balu; 2–6, 6–3, [10–5]	(Greece) Eleni Kordolaimi (Romania) Ana Bianca Mihăilă	(Russia) Margarita Lazareva (Greece) Eleni Kordolaimi	(Germany) Christina Shakovets (Romania) Ana Bianca Mihăilă (Egypt) Ola Abou Zekry (Canada) Petra Januskova
June 27	Amarante, Portugal; Hard $10,000; Singles and doubles draws	(Cambodia) Andrea Ka; 3–6, 7–6^{(8–6)}, 7–5	(Spain) Alba Carrillo Marín	(Greece) Despina Papamichail (Slovakia) Tereza Mihalíková	(Spain) Ainhoa Atucha Gómez (France) Laëtitia Sarrazin (Switzerland) Sara Ottomano (Spain) Arabela Fernández Rabener
June 27	Amarante, Portugal; Hard $10,000; Singles and doubles draws	(Slovakia) Tereza Mihalíková (Portugal) Inês Murta; 7–6^{(7–5)}, 6–3	(Switzerland) Jessica Crivelletto (Greece) Despina Papamichail	(Greece) Despina Papamichail (Slovakia) Tereza Mihalíková	(Spain) Ainhoa Atucha Gómez (France) Laëtitia Sarrazin (Switzerland) Sara Ottomano (Spain) Arabela Fernández Rabener
June 27	Focșani, Romania; Clay $10,000; Singles and doubles draws	(Moldova) Anastasia Vdovenco; 7–5, 4–6, 6–1	(Romania) Cristina Ene	(Romania) Gabriela Talabă (Romania) Irina Fetecău	(Romania) Miriam Bulgaru (Romania) Teodora Stîngă (Romania) Elena-Teodora Cadar (Romania) Ilona Georgiana Ghioroaie
June 27	Focșani, Romania; Clay $10,000; Singles and doubles draws	(Romania) Oana Georgeta Simion (Romania) Gabriela Talabă; 5–7, 6–1, [10–6]	(Moldova) Daniela Ciobanu (France) Kassandra Davesne	(Romania) Gabriela Talabă (Romania) Irina Fetecău	(Romania) Miriam Bulgaru (Romania) Teodora Stîngă (Romania) Elena-Teodora Cadar (Romania) Ilona Georgiana Ghioroaie
June 27	Kazan Open; Kazan, Russia; Clay $10,000; Singles and doubles draws	(Russia) Amina Anshba; 5–7, 6–1, 6–0	(Russia) Anastasia Gasanova	(Russia) Yana Sizikova (Russia) Valeriya Zeleva	(Russia) Valeriya Urzhumova (Russia) Aleksandra Pospelova (Russia) Olga Puchkova (Russia) Ulyana Ayzatulina
June 27	Kazan Open; Kazan, Russia; Clay $10,000; Singles and doubles draws	(Russia) Olga Doroshina (Russia) Yana Sizikova; 6–4, 6–7^{(8–10)}, [10–5]	(Russia) Amina Anshba (Russia) Angelina Gabueva	(Russia) Yana Sizikova (Russia) Valeriya Zeleva	(Russia) Valeriya Urzhumova (Russia) Aleksandra Pospelova (Russia) Olga Puchkova (Russia) Ulyana Ayzatulina
June 27	Gimcheon, South Korea; Hard $10,000; Singles and doubles draws	(South Korea) Jeong Su-nam; 4–6, 6–2, 6–3	(United States) Hanna Chang	(South Korea) Hong Seung-yeon (South Korea) Choi Ji-hee	(Japan) Miharu Imanishi (South Korea) Han Sung-hee (South Korea) Kim Hae-sung (China) Wang Yan
June 27	Gimcheon, South Korea; Hard $10,000; Singles and doubles draws	(Japan) Robu Kajitani (Japan) Akiko Omae; 5–7, 6–4, [10–5]	(South Korea) Jung So-hee (South Korea) Park Sang-hee	(South Korea) Hong Seung-yeon (South Korea) Choi Ji-hee	(Japan) Miharu Imanishi (South Korea) Han Sung-hee (South Korea) Kim Hae-sung (China) Wang Yan
June 27	Antalya, Turkey; Hard $10,000; Singles and doubles draws	(Slovakia) Zuzana Zlochová; 6–4, 7–6^{(7–5)}	(United Kingdom) Suzy Larkin	(Turkey) Melis Sezer (France) Caroline Roméo	(Turkey) Başak Eraydın (Chile) Bárbara Gatica (Israel) Vlada Ekshibarova (New Zealand) Joanna Carswell
June 27	Antalya, Turkey; Hard $10,000; Singles and doubles draws	(Turkey) Melis Sezer (Montenegro) Ana Veselinović; 6–3, 6–4	(Israel) Vlada Ekshibarova (Ukraine) Alyona Sotnikova	(Turkey) Melis Sezer (France) Caroline Roméo	(Turkey) Başak Eraydın (Chile) Bárbara Gatica (Israel) Vlada Ekshibarova (New Zealand) Joanna Carswell
