= Joanna Carswell =

New Zealand tennis player

- Country (sports): New Zealand
- Residence: Auckland, New Zealand
- Born: 8 July 1988 (age 37); Thames, New Zealand
- Plays: Right-handed (two-handed backhand)
- Prize money: $4,415

Singles
- Career record: 17–23
- Career titles: 0
- Highest ranking: No. 810 (8 May 2017)
- Current ranking: No. 888 (17 July 2017)

Doubles
- Career record: 5–10
- Career titles: 0

Team competitions
- Fed Cup: 1–0
- Last updated on: 20 July 2017.

Joanna Carswell (born 8 July 1988) is a New Zealand female tennis player.

Carswell has a career high WTA singles ranking of 810, achieved on 8 May 2017.

Playing for New Zealand in Fed Cup, she has a career W/L record of 1–0.
