= 2016 Tianjin Health Industry Park – Doubles =

Doubles
- 2016 Tianjin Health Industry Park

Final
- Champions: (China) Li Yihong (China) Wang Yan
- Runners-up: (China) Liu Wanting (China) Lu Jingjing
- Score: 1–6, 6–0, [10–4]

Events
Singles	Doubles
← 2015 ·	Tianjin Health Industry Park	· 2017 →

Liu Wanting and Lu Jingjing were the defending champions, but lost in the final to the wildcard pairing of Li Yihong and Wang Yan, 1–6, 6–0, [10–4].

== Seeds ==
1. (Thailand) Nicha Lertpitaksinchai / (Thailand) Peangtarn Plipuech (quarterfinals)
2. (China) Tian Ran / (China) You Xiaodi (semifinals; withdrew)
3. (Japan) Hiroko Kuwata / (Japan) Riko Sawayanagi (semifinals)
4. (United States) Jacqueline Cako / (United States) Danielle Lao (quarterfinals)

== Draw ==
=== Key ===
- Q = Qualifier
- WC = Wild card
- LL = Lucky loser
- Alt = Alternate
- SE = Special exempt
- PR = Protected ranking
- ITF = ITF entry
- JE = Junior exempt
- w/o = Walkover
- r = Retired
- d = Defaulted
- SR = Special ranking

First round
1	(Thailand) N Lertpitaksinchai (Thailand) Pe Plipuech	6	7
(Slovakia) M Hončová (Russia) A Tarasova	4	5
WC	(China) J Kang (China) F Liu	4	2
(China) W Liu (China) J Lu	6	6
3	(Japan) H Kuwata (Japan) R Sawayanagi	6	2	[10]
(Bulgaria) A Naydenova (Belarus) A Sabalenka	4	6	[4]
(South Korea) N-r Kim (China) Q Ye	6	6
(China) J Chen (China) D Zhao	3	2
WC	(China) Y Li (China) Y Wang	6	5	[10]
(China) F Xun (China) Y Zhang	3	7	[7]
(Mexico) S León (United States) J Wacnik	2	4
4	(United States) J Cako (United States) D Lao	6	6
(Russia) A Pivovarova (Serbia) N Stojanović	6	7^{8}
(Uzbekistan) A Amanmuradova (Hong Kong) L Zhang	4	6^{6}
(China) Y Sheng (Russia) E Yashina	2	3
2	(China) R Tian (China) X You	6	6

Quarterfinals
1	(Thailand) N Lertpitaksinchai (Thailand) Pe Plipuech	3	4
(China) W Liu (China) J Lu	6	6
3	(Japan) H Kuwata (Japan) R Sawayanagi	4	6	[10]
(South Korea) N-r Kim (China) Q Ye	6	0	[6]
WC	(China) Y Li (China) Y Wang	4	6	[10]
4	(United States) J Cako (United States) D Lao	6	4	[2]
(Russia) A Pivovarova (Serbia) N Stojanović	6^{5}	7	[8]
2	(China) R Tian (China) X You	7^{7}	5	[10]

Semifinals
(China) W Liu (China) J Lu	6	7
3	(Japan) H Kuwata (Japan) R Sawayanagi	4	5
WC	(China) Y Li (China) Y Wang	w/o
2	(China) R Tian (China) X You

Final
(China) W Liu (China) J Lu	6	0	[4]
WC	(China) Y Li (China) Y Wang	1	6	[10]
