= 2016 Tianjin Health Industry Park =

- Date: 23–29 May
- Edition: 3rd
- Category: ITF Women's Circuit
- Prize money: $50,000
- Surface: Hard
- Location: Tianjin, China

Champions

Singles
- (Belarus) Aryna Sabalenka

Doubles
- (China) Li Yihong / (China) Wang Yan
← 2015 ·	Tianjin Health Industry Park	· 2017 →

The 2016 Tianjin Health Industry Park was a professional tennis tournament played on outdoor hard courts. It was the third edition of the tournament and part of the 2016 ITF Women's Circuit, offering a total of $50,000 in prize money. It took place in Tianjin, China, on 23–29 May 2016.

== Singles main draw entrants ==
=== Seeds ===
Country	Player	Rank^{1}	Seed
JPN	Hiroko Kuwata	151	1
CHN	Liu Fangzhou	183	2
JPN	Riko Sawayanagi	188	3
KOR	Jang Su-jeong	191	4
RUS	Anastasia Pivovarova	231	5
CHN	Lu Jingjing	233	6
BLR	Aryna Sabalenka	261	7
USA	Danielle Lao	279	8

- ^{1} Rankings as of 16 May 2016.

=== Other entrants ===
The following player received a wildcard into the singles main draw:

- (China) Lu Jiaxi

The following players received entry from the qualifying draw:

- (China) Chen Jiahui
- (China) Jiang Xinyu
- (China) Tang Haochen
- (China) Zhang Ying

== Champions ==
=== Singles ===
- (Belarus) Aryna Sabalenka def. (Serbia) Nina Stojanović, 5–7, 6–3, 6–1

=== Doubles ===
- (China) Li Yihong / (China) Wang Yan def. (China) Liu Wanting / (China) Lu Jingjing, 1–6, 6–0, [10–4]
