= 2017 Blossom Cup – Doubles =

Doubles
- 2017 Blossom Cup

Final
- Champions: (China) Han Xinyun (China) Ye Qiuyu
- Runners-up: (Japan) Hiroko Kuwata (China) Zhu Lin
- Score: 6–3, 6–3

Events
Singles	Doubles
← 2016 ·	Blossom Cup	· 2018 →

Shuko Aoyama and Makoto Ninomiya were the defending champions, but both players chose not to participate.

Han Xinyun and Ye Qiuyu won the title, defeating Hiroko Kuwata and Zhu Lin in the final, 6–3, 6–3.

== Seeds ==
1. (Japan) Hiroko Kuwata / (China) Zhu Lin (final)
2. (Chinese Taipei) Chan Chin-wei / (China) Lu Jingjing (first round)
3. (Russia) Ksenia Lykina / (Japan) Junri Namigata (semifinals)
4. (Chinese Taipei) Chang Kai-chen / (China) Zhang Kailin (semifinals)

== Draw ==
=== Key ===
- Q = Qualifier
- WC = Wild card
- LL = Lucky loser
- Alt = Alternate
- SE = Special exempt
- PR = Protected ranking
- ITF = ITF entry
- JE = Junior exempt
- w/o = Walkover
- r = Retired
- d = Defaulted
- SR = Special ranking

First round
1	(Japan) H Kuwata (China) L Zhu	7^{8}	6
(China) X Sun (China) Z Sun	6^{6}	3
(Kazakhstan) Z Diyas (China) S Zheng	6	6
(China) X Gao (China) Y Li	4	3
4	(Chinese Taipei) K-c Chang (China) K Zhang	4	6	[10]
(China) X Jiang (China) Q Tang	6	3	[8]
WC	(China) C Xin (China) K Zhou	2	2
(China) C Liu (China) Jia Lu	6	6
(Uzbekistan) A Amanmuradova (Japan) K Okamura	3	5
(China) H Guo (China) Y Wang	6	7
(Japan) M Inoue (Poland) K Kawa	4	4
3	(Russia) K Lykina (Japan) J Namigata	6	6
WC	(China) J Chen (China) H Tang	2	6	[7]
(China) F Xun (China) Y Zhang	6	3	[10]
(China) X Han (China) Q Ye	6	6
2	(Chinese Taipei) C-w Chan (China) Jin Lu	0	2

Quarterfinals
1	(Japan) H Kuwata (China) L Zhu	7	2	[10]
(Kazakhstan) Z Diyas (China) S Zheng	5	6	[3]
4	(Chinese Taipei) K-c Chang (China) K Zhang	6	5	[10]
(China) C Liu (China) Jia Lu	4	7	[1]
(China) H Guo (China) Y Wang	1	2
3	(Russia) K Lykina (Japan) J Namigata	6	6
(China) F Xun (China) Y Zhang	6^{6}	4
(China) X Han (China) Q Ye	7^{8}	6

Semifinals
1	(Japan) H Kuwata (China) L Zhu	6	6
4	(Chinese Taipei) K-c Chang (China) K Zhang	4	4
3	(Russia) K Lykina (Japan) J Namigata	2	2
(China) X Han (China) Q Ye	6	6

Final
1	(Japan) H Kuwata (China) L Zhu	3	3
(China) X Han (China) Q Ye	6	6
