= 2017 Blossom Cup – Singles =

Singles
- 2017 Blossom Cup

Final
- Champion: (China) Zheng Saisai
- Runner-up: (China) Liu Fangzhou
- Score: 6–2, 6–3

Events
Singles	Doubles
← 2016 ·	Blossom Cup	· 2018 →

Wang Qiang was the defending champion, but chose not to participate.
Zheng Saisai won the title, defeating Liu Fangzhou 6–2, 6–3 in the final.

== Seeds ==
1. (China) Zheng Saisai (champion)
2. (Chinese Taipei) Chang Kai-chen (second round)
3. (China) Zhang Kailin (quarterfinals)
4. (China) Han Xinyun (second round)
5. (China) Zhu Lin (second round)
6. (China) Liu Fangzhou (final)
7. (South Korea) Jang Su-jeong (semifinals)
8. (Japan) Hiroko Kuwata (semifinals)

== Draw ==
=== Key ===
- Q = Qualifier
- WC = Wild card
- LL = Lucky loser
- Alt = Alternate
- SE = Special exempt
- PR = Protected ranking
- ITF = ITF entry
- JE = Junior exempt
- w/o = Walkover
- r = Retired
- d = Defaulted
- SR = Special ranking

=== Finals ===
Semifinals
1	(China) Zheng Saisai	6	6
7	(South Korea) Jang Su-jeong	3	1
6	(China) Liu Fangzhou	6	6
8	(Japan) Hiroko Kuwata	2	1

Final
1	(China) Zheng Saisai	6	6
6	(China) Liu Fangzhou	2	3

=== Top half ===
First round
1	(China) S Zheng	6	6
(China) X Sun	0	1
(China) H Guo	7	2	5
(India) A Raina	5	6	7
(Kazakhstan) Z Diyas	6	6
Q	(China) X Jiang	1	2
WC	(China) L Wang	0	0
5	(China) L Zhu	6	6
3	(China) K Zhang	6	3	6
(China) H Tang	1	6	1
(Uzbekistan) A Amanmuradova	6^{3}	6	6
(China) S Guo	7^{7}	2	4
(Switzerland) P Schnyder	6	6
(Japan) K Okamura	1	2
(Poland) K Kawa	4	0
7	(South Korea) S-j Jang	6	6

Second round
1	(China) S Zheng	6	6
(India) A Raina	3	2
(Kazakhstan) Z Diyas	6	6
5	(China) L Zhu	4	1
3	(China) K Zhang	6	7^{7}
(Uzbekistan) A Amanmuradova	4	6^{0}
(Switzerland) P Schnyder	2	2
7	(South Korea) S-j Jang	6	6

Quarterfinals
1	(China) S Zheng	6	6
(Kazakhstan) Z Diyas	2	0
3	(China) K Zhang	5	0
7	(South Korea) S-j Jang	7	6

Semifinals
1	(China) S Zheng	6	6
7	(South Korea) S-j Jang	3	1

=== Bottom half ===
First round
6	(China) F Liu	6	6
Q	(Japan) M Inoue	3	1
(China) R Tian	0	0
(Japan) J Namigata	6	6
(China) Yu Zhang	1	3
(China) J Lu	6	6
(China) F Xun	1	5
4	(China) X Han	6	7
8	(Japan) H Kuwata	6	7^{7}
Q	(China) J Chen	4	6^{1}
(Russia) K Lykina	6	6
(Russia) V Savinykh	4	2
(China) Yi Zhang	2	6	6^{2}
(China) X Gao	6	4	7^{7}
Q	(Japan) M Minokoshi	1	4
2	(Chinese Taipei) K-c Chang	6	6

Second round
6	(China) F Liu	6	6
(Japan) J Namigata	1	1
(China) J Lu	6	7
4	(China) X Han	3	5
8	(Japan) H Kuwata	7^{7}	7^{7}
(Russia) K Lykina	6^{5}	6^{5}
(China) X Gao	7	2	6
2	(Chinese Taipei) K-c Chang	5	6	4

Quarterfinals
6	(China) F Liu	6	2	6
(China) J Lu	3	6	0
8	(Japan) H Kuwata	4	6	7^{7}
(China) X Gao	6	4	6^{2}

Semifinals
6	(China) F Liu	6	6
8	(Japan) H Kuwata	2	1
