= 2011 Ningbo Challenger =

- Date: 12–18 September
- Edition: 1st (men); 2nd (women)
- Location: Ningbo, China

Champions

Men's singles
- (Chinese Taipei) Lu Yen-hsun

Women's singles
- (Belarus) Anastasiya Yakimova

Men's doubles
- (India) Karan Rastogi / (India) Divij Sharan

Women's doubles
- (Ukraine) Tetiana Luzhanska / (China) Zheng Saisai
- Ningbo Challenger

The 2011 Ningbo Challenger was a professional tennis tournament played on hard courts. It was the first edition of the tournament which was part of the 2011 ATP Challenger Tour and the second edition for the 2011 ITF Women's Circuit. It took place in Ningbo, China between 12 and 18 September 2011.

== ATP entrants ==
=== Seeds ===
Country	Player	Rank^{1}	Seed
TPE	Lu Yen-hsun	82	1
GER	Rainer Schüttler	111	2
RUS	Alexander Kudryavtsev	145	3
GER	Cedrik-Marcel Stebe	151	4
EST	Jürgen Zopp	204	5
USA	Michael Yani	206	6
GER	Dominik Meffert	211	7
RSA	Fritz Wolmarans	212	8

- ^{1} Rankings are as of August 29, 2011.

=== Other entrants ===
The following players received wildcards into the singles main draw:

- (China) Wang Chuhan
- (China) Feng He
- (China) Ma Yanan
- (China) Zhou Zhuoqing

The following players received entry from the qualifying draw:

- (Slovenia) Luka Gregorc
- (Indonesia) Christopher Rungkat
- (New Zealand) Jose Rubin Statham
- (South Korea) Daniel Yoo

== WTA entrants ==
=== Seeds ===
Country	Player	Rank^{1}	Seed
NED	Arantxa Rus	82	1
BLR	Anastasiya Yakimova	84	2
FRA	Stéphanie Foretz Gacon	116	3
TPE	Chang Kai-chen	140	4
JPN	Erika Sema	145	5
UKR	Tetiana Luzhanska	147	6
THA	Noppawan Lertcheewakarn	156	7
CHN	Han Xinyun	169	8

- ^{1} Rankings are as of August 29, 2011.

=== Other entrants ===
The following players received wildcards into the singles main draw:

- (China) Duan Yingying
- (China) Liu Wanting
- (China) Tian Ran
- (China) Zhao Di

The following players received entry from the qualifying draw:

- (Japan) Shuko Aoyama
- (China) Hu Yueyue
- (China) Xu Yifan
- (China) Zhu Lin

== Champions ==
=== Men's singles ===
(Chinese Taipei) Lu Yen-hsun def. (Estonia) Jürgen Zopp, 6–2, 3–6, 6–1

=== Women's singles ===
(Belarus) Anastasiya Yakimova def. (Japan) Erika Sema, 7–6^{(7–3)}, 6–3

=== Men's doubles ===
(India) Karan Rastogi / (India) Divij Sharan def. (Czech Republic) Jan Hernych / (Estonia) Jürgen Zopp, 3–6, 7–6^{(7–3)}, [13–11]

=== Women's doubles ===
(Ukraine) Tetiana Luzhanska / (China) Zheng Saisai def. (Chinese Taipei) Chan Chin-wei / (China) Han Xinyun, 6–4, 5–7, [10–4]
