= Tianjin Health Industry Park =

- 2016 Tianjin Health Industry Park

Defunct tennis tournament
- Event name: Tianjin
- Location: Tianjin, China
- Venue: Tianjin International Tennis Center
- Surface: Hard
ATP Tour
- Category: ATP Challenger Tour
- Draw: 32S / 28Q / 16D
- Prize money: $50,000+H
WTA Tour
- Category: ITF Women's Circuit
- Draw: 32S / 32Q / 16D
- Prize money: $25,000

The Tianjin Health Industry Park was a professional tennis tournament played on outdoor hardcourts. It was part of the ITF Women's Circuit. It was previously part of the ATP Challenger Tour in 2014. It was annually in Tianjin, China from 2014 until 2019.

== Past finals ==
=== Men's singles ===
Year	Champion	Runner-up	Score
2014	(Slovenia) Blaž Kavčič	(Russia) Alexander Kudryavtsev	6–2, 3–6, 7–5

=== Women's singles ===
Year	Champion	Runner-up	Score
2019	(China) Wang Xinyu	(Serbia) Jovana Jakšić	6–4, 6–2
2018	(China) Liu Fangzhou	(China) Lu Jingjing	3–6, 6–3, 6–3
2017	(China) Wang Yafan	(China) Zhu Lin	6–4, 6–2
2016	(Belarus) Aryna Sabalenka	(Serbia) Nina Stojanović	5–7, 6–3, 6–1
2015	(China) Duan Yingying	(China) Wang Qiang	4–6, 7–6^{(7–2)}, 3–0 ret.
2014	(China) Wang Qiang	(China) Zhu Lin	6–3, 6–2

=== Men's doubles ===
Year	Champions	Runners-up	Score
2014	(Germany) Robin Kern (France) Josselin Ouanna	(United States) Jason Jung (United States) Evan King	6–7^{(3–7)}, 7–5, [10–8]

=== Women's doubles ===
Year	Champions	Runners-up	Score
2019	(China) Jiang Xinyu (China) Tang Qianhui	(China) Wu Meixu (China) Zheng Wushuang	7–5, 6–2
2018	(China) Feng Shuo (China) Jiang Xinyu	(China) Chen Jiahui (China) Ye Qiuyu	6–4, 6–4
2017	(China) Jiang Xinyu (China) Tang Qianhui	(China) Liu Chang (China) Lu Jiajing	6–4, 6–1
2016	(China) Li Yihong (China) Wang Yan	(China) Liu Wanting (China) Lu Jingjing	1–6, 6–0, [10–4]
2015	(China) Liu Wanting (China) Lu Jingjing	(China) Chen Jiahui (China) You Xiaodi	6–7^{(4–7)}, 7–6^{(7–3)}, [10–4]
2014	(China) Liu Chang (China) Tian Ran	(Oman) Fatma Al-Nabhani (India) Ankita Raina	6–1, 7–5
