= 2011 Ningbo Challenger – Women's singles =

Women's singles
- 2011 Ningbo Challenger

Final
- Champion: (Belarus) Anastasiya Yakimova
- Runner-up: (Japan) Erika Sema
- Score: 7–6^{(7–3)}, 6–3

Events
Singles	men	women
Doubles	men	women
- Ningbo Challenger

Alberta Brianti was the defending champion, but chose not to participate.
Anastasiya Yakimova won the title by defeating Erika Sema in the final 7–6^{(7–3)}, 6–3.

== Seeds ==
1. (Netherlands) Arantxa Rus (second round)
2. (Belarus) Anastasiya Yakimova (champion)
3. (France) Stéphanie Foretz Gacon (semifinals, retired)
4. (Chinese Taipei) Chang Kai-chen (quarterfinals)
5. (Japan) Erika Sema (final)
6. (Ukraine) Tetiana Luzhanska (quarterfinals)
7. (Thailand) Noppawan Lertcheewakarn (second round, retired)
8. (China) Han Xinyun (first round)

== Main draw ==
Key

- Q = Qualifier
- WC = Wild card
- LL = Lucky loser
- Alt = Alternate
- ITF = ITF entry
- PR = Protected ranking
- SR = Special ranking
- SE = Special exempt
- JE = Junior exempt
- JR = Junior Accelerator Programme entrant
- CO = College Accelerator Programme entrant
- NG = Next Gen Accelerator Program entrant
- w/o = Walkover
- r = Retired
- d = Defaulted

=== Finals ===
Semifinals
Q	(China) Xu Yifan	2	3
5	(Japan) Erika Sema	6	6
3	(France) Stéphanie Foretz Gacon	4	0^{r}
2	(Belarus) Anastasiya Yakimova	6	1

Final
5	(Japan) Erika Sema	6^{3}	3
2	(Belarus) Anastasiya Yakimova	7^{7}	6

=== Top half ===
First round
1	(Netherlands) A Rus	6	7^{7}
(China) S Sun	2	6^{5}
Q	(China) Y Xu	6	6
(South Korea) S-j Kim	3	3
Q	(China) Y Hu	6^{3}	6	3
(China) Q Wang	7^{7}	4	0^{r}
(Chinese Taipei) S-w Hsieh	6	6
8	(China) X Han	0	2
4	(Chinese Taipei) K-c Chang	6	6
(Poland) M Domachowska	2	1
WC	(China) W Liu	2	0
(Thailand) N Luangnam	6	6
(Czech Republic) Ka Plíšková	6	6
(Czech Republic) Kr Plíšková	3	4
Q	(China) L Zhu	2	0
5	(Japan) E Sema	6	6

Second round
1	(Netherlands) A Rus	4	6	3
Q	(China) Y Xu	6	0	6
Q	(China) Y Hu	6	0	6
(Chinese Taipei) S-w Hsieh	4	6	1
4	(Chinese Taipei) K-c Chang	6	6
(Thailand) N Luangnam	3	3
(Czech Republic) Ka Plíšková	1	3
5	(Japan) E Sema	6	6

Quarterfinals
Q	(China) Y Xu	6^{5}	6	6
Q	(China) Y Hu	7^{7}	2	1
4	(Chinese Taipei) K-c Chang	5	6	5
5	(Japan) E Sema	7	1	7

Semifinals
Q	(China) Y Xu	2	3
5	(Japan) E Sema	6	6

=== Bottom half ===
First round
6	(Ukraine) T Luzhanska	6	6
WC	(China) Y Duan	2	3
(Japan) R Fujiwara	6	6
(Japan) K Iijima	3	4
(China) S Zheng	7	4	1
(Japan) M Eguchi	5	6	6
Q	(Japan) S Aoyama	3	2
3	(France) S Foretz Gacon	6	6
7	(Thailand) N Lertcheewakarn	6	4	7
(Hong Kong) L Zhang	2	6	5
(Japan) A Nakamura	6	6
(China) J Lu	4	1
WC	(China) D Zhao	6	1	4
(Thailand) V Wongteanchai	3	6	6
WC	(China) R Tian	1	1
2	(Belarus) A Yakimova	6	6

Second round
6	(Ukraine) T Luzhanska	4	6	6
(Japan) R Fujiwara	6	3	2
(Japan) M Eguchi	2	2
3	(France) S Foretz Gacon	6	6
7	(Thailand) N Lertcheewakarn	2	r
(Japan) A Nakamura	6
(Thailand) V Wongteanchai	7^{10}	3	4
2	(Belarus) A Yakimova	6^{8}	6	6

Quarterfinals
6	(Ukraine) T Luzhanska	6^{7}	0
3	(France) S Foretz Gacon	7^{9}	6
(Japan) A Nakamura	2	1
2	(Belarus) A Yakimova	6	6

Semifinals
3	(France) S Foretz Gacon	4	0^{r}
2	(Belarus) A Yakimova	6	1
