= 2017 Blossom Cup =

- Date: 27 March–2 April
- Edition: 9th
- Category: ITF Women's Circuit
- Prize money: $60,000
- Surface: Hard
- Location: Quanzhou, China

Champions

Singles
- (China) Zheng Saisai

Doubles
- (China) Han Xinyun / (China) Ye Qiuyu
| ← 2016 · | Blossom Cup | · 2018 → |

The 2017 Blossom Cup was a professional tennis tournament played on outdoor hard courts. It was the ninth edition of the tournament and part of the 2017 ITF Women's Circuit, offering a total of $60,000 in prize money. It took place in Quanzhou, China, from 27 March–2 April 2017.

== Singles main draw entrants ==
=== Seeds ===
| Country | Player | Rank^{1} | Seed |
|---|---|---|---|
| CHN | Zheng Saisai | 100 | 1 |
| TPE | Chang Kai-chen | 114 | 2 |
| CHN | Zhang Kailin | 118 | 3 |
| CHN | Han Xinyun | 123 | 4 |
| CHN | Zhu Lin | 133 | 5 |
| CHN | Liu Fangzhou | 139 | 6 |
| KOR | Jang Su-jeong | 146 | 7 |
| JPN | Hiroko Kuwata | 181 | 8 |

- ^{1} Rankings as of 20 March 2017

=== Other entrants ===
The following player received a wildcard into the singles main draw:

- (China) Wang Lixin

The following players received entry from the qualifying draw:

- (China) Chen Jiahui
- (Japan) Miyabi Inoue
- (China) Jiang Xinyu
- (Japan) Mai Minokoshi

== Champions ==
=== Singles ===
- (China) Zheng Saisai def. (China) Liu Fangzhou, 6–2, 6–3

=== Doubles ===
- (China) Han Xinyun / (China) Ye Qiuyu def. (Japan) Hiroko Kuwata / (China) Zhu Lin, 6–3, 6–3
