= 2016 Tianjin Health Industry Park – Singles =

Singles
- 2016 Tianjin Health Industry Park

Final
- Champion: (Belarus) Aryna Sabalenka
- Runner-up: (Serbia) Nina Stojanović
- Score: 5–7, 6–3, 6–1

Events
Singles	Doubles
← 2015 ·	Tianjin Health Industry Park	· 2017 →

Duan Yingying was the defending champion, but chose not to participate.

Aryna Sabalenka won the title, defeating Nina Stojanović in the final, 5–7, 6–3, 6–1.

== Seeds ==
1. (Japan) Hiroko Kuwata (second round)
2. (China) Liu Fangzhou (semifinals)
3. (Japan) Riko Sawayanagi (second round)
4. (South Korea) Jang Su-jeong (second round)
5. (Russia) Anastasia Pivovarova (quarterfinals; retired)
6. (China) Lu Jingjing (quarterfinals)
7. (Belarus) Aryna Sabalenka (champion)
8. (United States) Danielle Lao (quarterfinals)

== Main draw ==
=== Key ===
- Q = Qualifier
- WC = Wild card
- LL = Lucky loser
- Alt = Alternate
- SE = Special exempt
- PR = Protected ranking
- ITF = ITF entry
- JE = Junior exempt
- w/o = Walkover
- r = Retired
- d = Defaulted
- SR = Special ranking

=== Finals ===
Semifinals
7	(Belarus) Aryna Sabalenka	6	0	6
(United States) Lauren Albanese	3	6	2
(Serbia) Nina Stojanović	6	3	6
2	(China) Liu Fangzhou	4	6	1

Final
7	(Belarus) Aryna Sabalenka	5	6	6
(Serbia) Nina Stojanović	7	3	1

=== Top half ===
First round
1	(Japan) H Kuwata	3	7^{7}	6
Q	(China) H Tang	6	6^{4}	3
(China) S Peng	6	6
(Thailand) P Plipuech	2	2
(Russia) A Tarasova	6	6
(China) A Gai	4	4
(China) X Sun	4	1
7	(Belarus) A Sabalenka	6	6
3	(Japan) R Sawayanagi	6	6
Q	(China) X Jiang	1	4
(United States) J Cako	1	4
(United States) L Albanese	6	6
(Australia) A Bai	4	7	4
(Thailand) N Lertpitaksinchai	6	5	6
(Hong Kong) L Zhang	3	1
8	(United States) D Lao	6	6

Second round
1	(Japan) H Kuwata	3	6	4
(China) S Peng	6	4	6
(Russia) A Tarasova	4	3
7	(Belarus) A Sabalenka	6	6
3	(Japan) R Sawayanagi	3	3
(United States) L Albanese	6	6
(Thailand) N Lertpitaksinchai	6	6^{6}	0
8	(United States) D Lao	4	7^{8}	6

Quarterfinals
(China) S Peng	4	2
7	(Belarus) A Sabalenka	6	6
(United States) L Albanese	7^{7}	6
8	(United States) D Lao	6^{3}	4

Semifinals
7	(Belarus) A Sabalenka	6	0	6
(United States) L Albanese	3	6	2

=== Bottom half ===
First round
6	(China) Jin Lu	7^{7}	4
(China) D Zhao	6^{4}	0^{r}
(Slovakia) M Hončová	7^{7}	6
(China) R Tian	6^{5}	4
(China) F Xun	4	2
(Serbia) N Stojanović	6	6
Q	(China) Y Zhang	4	1
4	(South Korea) S-j Jang	6	6
5	(Russia) A Pivovarova	6	6
(Russia) E Yashina	2	2
(China) J Kang	6	1	0
(Bulgaria) A Naydenova	2	6	6
Q	(China) J Chen	6	7
WC	(China) Jia Lu	3	5
(Uzbekistan) A Amanmuradova	0	0
2	(China) F Liu	6	6

Second round
6	(China) Jin Lu	6	6
(Slovakia) M Hončová	3	0
(Serbia) N Stojanović	6	6
4	(South Korea) S-j Jang	4	0
5	(Russia) A Pivovarova	7	6
(Bulgaria) A Naydenova	5	4
Q	(China) J Chen	1	4
2	(China) F Liu	6	6

Quarterfinals
6	(China) Jin Lu	6	4	3
(Serbia) N Stojanović	4	6	6
5	(Russia) A Pivovarova	4	0^{r}
2	(China) F Liu	6	1

Semifinals
(Serbia) N Stojanović	6	3	6
2	(China) F Liu	4	6	1
