= 2011 Ningbo Challenger – Women's doubles =

Women's doubles
- 2011 Ningbo Challenger

Final
- Champions: (Ukraine) Tetiana Luzhanska (China) Zheng Saisai
- Runners-up: (Chinese Taipei) Chan Chin-wei (China) Han Xinyun
- Score: 6–4, 5–7, [10–4]

Events
Singles	men	women
Doubles	men	women
- Ningbo Challenger

Chan Chin-wei and Chen Yi were the defending champions, both players chose to compete but participated with different partners and ended up playing each other in the second round with Chan and Han Xinyun defeating Chen and Liang Chen.
Tetiana Luzhanska and Zheng Saisai won the title, defeating Chan Chin-wei and Han Xinyun 6–4, 5–7, [10–4] in the final.

== Seeds ==
1. (Japan) Shuko Aoyama / (Japan) Rika Fujiwara (first round, retired)
2. (Thailand) Noppawan Lertcheewakarn / (Belarus) Anastasiya Yakimova (first round)
3. (China) Lu Jingjing / (China) Sun Shengnan (first round)
4. (Chinese Taipei) Chan Chin-wei / (China) Han Xinyun (final)

== Draw ==
Key

- Q = Qualifier
- WC = Wild card
- LL = Lucky loser
- Alt = Alternate
- ITF = ITF entry
- PR = Protected ranking
- SR = Special ranking
- SE = Special exempt
- JE = Junior exempt
- JR = Junior Accelerator Programme entrant
- CO = College Accelerator Programme entrant
- NG = Next Gen Accelerator Program entrant
- w/o = Walkover
- r = Retired
- d = Defaulted

=== Draw ===
First round
1	(Japan) S Aoyama (Japan) R Fujiwara	6^{6}	1^{r}
(China) W Liu (China) Y Xu	7^{8}	2
(Czech Republic) Ka Plíšková (Czech Republic) Kr Plíšková	0	5
(Poland) M Domachowska (Japan) E Sema	6	7
4	(Chinese Taipei) C-w Chan (China) X Han	6	7^{7}
WC	(China) Y Zhong (China) L Zhu	3	6^{5}
(Denmark) K Barbat (France) S Foretz Gacon	3	3
(Chinese Taipei) Y Chen (China) C Liang	6	6
(China) T Li (Thailand) V Wongteanchai	6	6
WC	(China) R Tian (China) D Zhao	2	2
(Ukraine) T Luzhanska (China) S Zheng	7	6
3	(China) J Lu (China) S Sun	5	4
WC	(China) X Dong (China) X Feng	6	4	[9]
(Chinese Taipei) H-c Chan (Japan) K Iijima	3	6	[11]
(Chinese Taipei) S-y Kao (China) Y Zhao	6	7^{7}
2	(Thailand) N Lertcheewakarn (Belarus) A Yakimova	3	6^{4}

Quarterfinals
(China) W Liu (China) Y Xu	2	7^{7}	[10]
(Poland) M Domachowska (Japan) E Sema	6	6^{4}	[6]
4	(Chinese Taipei) C-w Chan (China) X Han	6	2	[10]
(Chinese Taipei) Y Chen (China) C Liang	2	6	[4]
(China) T Li (Thailand) V Wongteanchai	6	3	[5]
(Ukraine) T Luzhanska (China) S Zheng	4	6	[10]
(Chinese Taipei) H-c Chan (Japan) K Iijima	6	3	[11]
(Chinese Taipei) S-y Kao (China) Y Zhao	2	6	[9]

Semifinals
(China) W Liu (China) Y Xu	1	1
4	(Chinese Taipei) C-w Chan (China) X Han	6	6
(Ukraine) T Luzhanska (China) S Zheng	6	3	[10]
(Chinese Taipei) H-c Chan (Japan) K Iijima	2	6	[8]

Finals
4	(Chinese Taipei) C-w Chan (China) X Han	4	7	[4]
(Ukraine) T Luzhanska (China) S Zheng	6	5	[10]
