= 2014 Tianjin Health Industry Park – Men's singles =

Men's singles
- 2014 Tianjin Health Industry Park

Final
- Champion: (Slovenia) Blaž Kavčič
- Runner-up: (Russia) Alexander Kudryavtsev
- Score: 6–2, 3–6, 7–5

Events
Singles	men	women
Doubles	men	women
Tianjin Health Industry Park	· 2015 →

This was the first and last edition of the men's tennis tournament.

Blaž Kavčič won the title, defeating Alexander Kudryavtsev in the final, 6–2, 3–6, 7–5.

== Seeds ==
1. (Slovenia) Blaž Kavčič (champion)
2. (Russia) Alexander Kudryavtsev (final)
3. (China) Wu Di (semifinals)
4. (Russia) Valery Rudnev (semifinals)
5. (France) Josselin Ouanna (quarterfinals)
6. (India) Jeevan Nedunchezhiyan (second round)
7. (Japan) Shuichi Sekiguchi (second round)
8. (Chinese Taipei) Chen Ti (quarterfinals)

== Draw ==
=== Key ===
- Q = Qualifier
- WC = Wild card
- LL = Lucky loser
- Alt = Alternate
- SE = Special exempt
- PR = Protected ranking
- ITF = ITF entry
- JE = Junior exempt
- w/o = Walkover
- r = Retired
- d = Defaulted
- SR = Special ranking

=== Finals ===
Semifinals
1	(Slovenia) Blaž Kavčič	6	6
3	(China) Wu Di	4	2
4	(Russia) Valery Rudnev	3	3
2	(Russia) Alexander Kudryavtsev	6	6

Final
1	(Slovenia) Blaž Kavčič	6	3	7
2	(Russia) Alexander Kudryavtsev	2	6	5

=== Top half ===
First round
1	(Slovenia) B Kavčič	6	6
(United States) E King	2	1
Q	(Australia) R Agar	7^{7}	6
(Japan) T Matsui	6^{1}	2
(France) F Martin	2	4
(Russia) D Matsukevich	6	6
Q	(China) Lu Yang	1	4
8	(Chinese Taipei) T Chen	6	6
3	(China) D Wu	6	6
(India) S Balaji	2	4
WC	(China) Z Li	6	6
(Japan) K Takeuchi	3	1
(South Korea) J-s Nam	3	6	5
(Germany) R Kern	6	3	7
WC	(China) M Gong	6^{9}	3
5	(France) J Ouanna	7^{11}	6

Second round
1	(Slovenia) B Kavčič	6	6
Q	(Australia) R Agar	2	1
(Russia) D Matsukevich	5	1
8	(Chinese Taipei) T Chen	7	6
3	(China) D Wu	6	7
WC	(China) Z Li	1	5
(Germany) R Kern	2	4
5	(France) J Ouanna	6	6

Quarterfinals
1	(Slovenia) B Kavčič	7^{7}	7
8	(Chinese Taipei) T Chen	6^{4}	5
3	(China) D Wu	6	7
5	(France) J Ouanna	3	5

Semifinals
1	(Slovenia) B Kavčič	6	6
3	(China) D Wu	4	2

=== Bottom half ===
First round
6	(India) J Nedunchezhiyan	6	5	6
WC	(China) Y Bai	1	7	4
Q	(Russia) M Ledovskikh	6	7
(Belarus) D Zhyrmont	3	5
(Japan) H Kondo	3	6	6
(Chinese Taipei) L-c Huang	6	2	1
(United States) J Jung	3	6	3
4	(Russia) V Rudnev	6	3	6
7	(Japan) Shuichi Sekiguchi	6	6
(United States) N Meister	3	1
Q	(China) S Liu	4	3
(Thailand) D Udomchoke	6	6
(Chinese Taipei) T-h Yang	3	6	2
WC	(China) C Wang	6	4	6
(South Korea) Y-k Lim
2	(Russia) A Kudryavtsev	w/o

Second round
6	(India) J Nedunchezhiyan	6^{0}	0
Q	(Russia) M Ledovskikh	7^{7}	6
(Japan) H Kondo	6^{2}	7^{7}	3
4	(Russia) V Rudnev	7^{7}	6^{5}	6
7	(Japan) S Sekiguchi	2	3
(Thailand) D Udomchoke	6	6
WC	(China) C Wang	4	4
2	(Russia) A Kudryavtsev	6	6

Quarterfinals
Q	(Russia) M Ledovskikh	5^{r}
4	(Russia) V Rudnev	2
(Thailand) D Udomchoke	6^{5}	3
2	(Russia) A Kudryavtsev	7^{7}	6

Semifinals
4	(Russia) V Rudnev	3	3
2	(Russia) A Kudryavtsev	6	6
