= 2018 Industrial Bank Cup =

- Date: 23–29 April
- Edition: 10th
- Category: ITF Women's Circuit
- Prize money: $60,000
- Surface: Hard
- Location: Quanzhou, China

Champions

Singles
- (China) Zheng Saisai

Doubles
- (China) Han Xinyun / (China) Ye Qiuyu
← 2017 ·	Industrial Bank Cup	· 2019 →

The 2018 Industrial Bank Cup was a professional tennis tournament played on outdoor hard courts. It was the tenth edition of the tournament and was part of the 2018 ITF Women's Circuit. It took place in Quanzhou, China, on 23–29 April 2018.

== Singles main draw entrants ==
=== Seeds ===
Country	Player	Rank^{1}	Seed
THA	Luksika Kumkhum	90	1
~~CHN~~	~~Wang Yafan~~	~~98~~	~~2~~
CHN	Duan Yingying	104	3
BEL	Yanina Wickmayer	107	4
GBR	Naomi Broady	134	5
CHN	Zheng Saisai	139	6
RUS	Vera Zvonareva	144	7
KOR	Jang Su-jeong	169	8

- ^{1} Rankings as of 16 April 2018.

=== Other entrants ===
The following players received a wildcard into the singles main draw:

- (China) Guo Hanyu
- (China) He Yunqi
- (China) Ren Jiaqi
- (China) Yuan Yue

The following player received entry using a junior exempt:

- (China) Wang Xinyu

The following players received entry from the qualifying draw:

- (China) Gai Ao
- (China) Sun Xuliu
- (China) Zhang Kailin
- (China) Zheng Wushuang

The following player received entry as a lucky loser:

- (China) Kang Jiaqi

== Champions ==
=== Singles ===
- (China) Zheng Saisai def. (China) Liu Fangzhou, 6–3, 6–1

=== Doubles ===
- (China) Han Xinyun / (China) Ye Qiuyu def. (China) Guo Hanyu / (China) Wang Xinyu, 7–6^{(7–3)}, 7–6^{(8–6)}
