= 2014 Tianjin Health Industry Park =

- Date: 16–22 June (men); 19 – 25 May (women)
- Edition: 1st
- Draw: 32S / 16D
- Prize money: $50,000+H $25,000
- Surface: Hard
- Location: Tianjin, China

Champions

Men's singles
- (Slovenia) Blaž Kavčič

Women's singles
- (China) Wang Qiang

Men's doubles
- (Germany) Robin Kern / (France) Josselin Ouanna

Women's doubles
- (China) Liu Chang / (China) Tian Ran
- Tianjin Health Industry Park

The 2014 Tianjin Health Industry Park was a professional tennis tournament played on clay courts. It was the first edition of the tournament and part of the 2014 ATP Challenger Tour and 2014 ITF Women's Circuit, offering a total of $50,000+H (ATP) and $25,000 (ITF) in prize money. It took place in Tianjin, China, the men's event took place from 16 to 22 June 2014 while the women's event took place from 19 to 25 May 2014.

== Men's singles main-draw entrants ==
=== Seeds ===
| Country | Player | Rank^{1} | Seed |
|---|---|---|---|
| SLO | Blaž Kavčič | 133 | 1 |
| RUS | Alexander Kudryavtsev | 184 | 2 |
| CHN | Wu Di | 238 | 3 |
| RUS | Valery Rudnev | 268 | 4 |
| FRA | Josselin Ouanna | 269 | 5 |
| IND | Jeevan Nedunchezhiyan | 295 | 6 |
| JPN | Shuichi Sekiguchi | 303 | 7 |
| TPE | Chen Ti | 309 | 8 |

- ^{1} Rankings are as of June 9, 2014.

=== Other entrants ===
The following players received wildcards into the singles main draw:

- (China) Li Zhe
- (China) Gong Maoxin
- (China) Yan Bai
- (China) Wang Chuhan

The following players received entry from the qualifying draw:

- (Australia) Ryan Agar
- (China) Lu Yang
- (Russia) Mikhail Ledovskikh
- (China) Liu Siyu

== Doubles main-draw entrants ==
=== Seeds ===
| Country | Player | Country | Player | Rank^{1} | Seed |
|---|---|---|---|---|---|
| AUS | Jordan Kerr | FRA | Fabrice Martin | 371 | 1 |
| JPN | Hiroki Kondo | TPE | Lee Hsin-han | 429 | 2 |
| TPE | Chen Ti | KOR | Lim Yong-kyu | 436 | 3 |
| AUS | Ryan Agar | TPE | Huang Liang-chi | 490 | 4 |

- ^{1} Rankings as of June 9, 2014.

=== Other entrants ===
The following pairs received wildcards into the doubles main draw:

- (China) Ning Yuqing / (China) Ouyang Bowen
- (China) Bai Yan / (China) Wu Di
- (China) Gao Xin / (China) Wang Chuhan

== Champions ==
=== Men's singles ===
- (Slovenia) Blaž Kavčič def. (Russia) Alexander Kudryavtsev, 6–2, 3–6, 7–5

=== Women's singles ===
- (China) Wang Qiang def. (China) Zhu Lin, 6–3, 6–2

=== Men's doubles ===
- (Germany) Robin Kern / (France) Josselin Ouanna def. (United States) Jason Jung / (United States) Evan King, 6–7^{(3–7)}, 7–5, [10–8]

=== Women's doubles ===
- (China) Liu Chang / (China) Tian Ran def. (Oman) Fatma Al-Nabhani / (India) Ankita Raina, 6–1, 7–5
