= 2018 Industrial Bank Cup – Singles =

Singles
- 2018 Industrial Bank Cup

Final
- Champion: (China) Zheng Saisai
- Runner-up: (China) Liu Fangzhou
- Score: 6–3, 6–1

Events
Singles	Doubles
← 2017 ·	Industrial Bank Cup	· 2019 →

Zheng Saisai was the defending champion, and successfully defended her title, defeating Liu Fangzhou in the final, 6–3, 6–1.

== Seeds ==
1. (Thailand) Luksika Kumkhum (semifinals)
2. (China) Wang Yafan (withdrew)
3. (China) Duan Yingying (second round)
4. (Belgium) Yanina Wickmayer (quarterfinals)
5. (United Kingdom) Naomi Broady (semifinals)
6. (China) Zheng Saisai (champion)
7. (Russia) Vera Zvonareva (second round, retired)
8. (South Korea) Jang Su-jeong (first round)

== Draw ==
=== Key ===
- Q = Qualifier
- WC = Wild card
- LL = Lucky loser
- Alt = Alternate
- SE = Special exempt
- PR = Protected ranking
- ITF = ITF entry
- JE = Junior exempt
- w/o = Walkover
- r = Retired
- d = Defaulted
- SR = Special ranking

=== Finals ===
Semifinals
1	(Thailand) Luksika Kumkhum	3	4
(China) Liu Fangzhou	6	6
5	(United Kingdom) Naomi Broady	6^{8}	6	3
6	(China) Zheng Saisai	7^{10}	4	6

Final
(China) Liu Fangzhou	3	1
6	(China) Zheng Saisai	6	6

=== Top half ===
First round
1	(Thailand) L Kumkhum	6	6
(Russia) V Diatchenko	2	3
WC	(China) Y He	1	1
(Japan) E Sema	6	6
LL	(China) J Kang	1	6^{4}
JE	(China) Xin Wang	6	7^{7}
(China) Jia Lu	6	6
8	(South Korea) S-j Jang	0	1
3	(China) Y Duan	6	6
(Japan) M Minokoshi	2	4
(China) F Liu	2	6	6
Q	(China) K Zhang	6	3	2
(United States) D Lao	6	7
Q	(China) A Gai	4	5
(Netherlands) L Kerkhove	3	3
7	(Russia) V Zvonareva	6	6

Second round
1	(Thailand) L Kumkhum	5	6	6
(Japan) E Sema	7	2	3
JE	(China) Xin Wang	4	5
(China) Jia Lu	6	7
3	(China) Y Duan	3	5
(China) F Liu	6	7
(United States) D Lao	0	6	4
7	(Russia) V Zvonareva	6	1	4^{r}

Quarterfinals
1	(Thailand) L Kumkhum	6	6
(China) Jia Lu	3	3
(China) F Liu	5	6	6
(United States) D Lao	7	3	2

Semifinals
1	(Thailand) L Kumkhum	3	4
(China) F Liu	6	6

=== Bottom half ===
First round
5	(United Kingdom) N Broady	6	6
(Japan) M Imanishi	3	2
(Japan) A Shimizu	6	2	2
(India) A Raina	4	6	6
WC	(China) Y Yuan	2	6	1
Q	(China) X Sun	6	2	6
(Uzbekistan) S Sharipova	6^{4}	2
4	(Belgium) Y Wickmayer	7^{7}	6
6	(China) S Zheng	6	6
WC	(China) H Guo	3	4
(United States) J Cako	6	6
WC	(China) J Ren	1	1
(Japan) H Kaji	6	6
(China) F Xun	3	0
(China) X Han	6	6
Q	(China) W Zheng	3	3

Second round
5	(United Kingdom) N Broady	3	6	6
(India) A Raina	6	0	2
Q	(China) X Sun	3	2
4	(Belgium) Y Wickmayer	6	6
6	(China) S Zheng	6	6
(United States) J Cako	4	3
(Japan) H Kaji	4	6	3
(China) X Han	6	3	6

Quarterfinals
5	(United Kingdom) N Broady	3	6	6
4	(Belgium) Y Wickmayer	6	4	2
6	(China) S Zheng	5
(China) X Han	0^{r}

Semifinals
5	(United Kingdom) N Broady	6^{8}	6	3
6	(China) S Zheng	7^{10}	4	6
