= 2018 Industrial Bank Cup – Doubles =

Doubles
- 2018 Industrial Bank Cup

Final
- Champions: (China) Han Xinyun (China) Ye Qiuyu
- Runners-up: (China) Guo Hanyu (China) Wang Xinyu
- Score: 7–6^{(7–3)}, 7–6^{(8–6)}

Events
Singles	Doubles
← 2017 ·	Industrial Bank Cup	· 2019 →

Han Xinyun and Ye Qiuyu successfully defended their title, defeating Guo Hanyu and Wang Xinyu in the final, 7–6^{(7–3)}, 7–6^{(8–6)}.

== Seeds ==
1. (China) Han Xinyun / (China) Ye Qiuyu (champions)
2. (United Kingdom) Naomi Broady / (Russia) Vera Zvonareva (first round; withdrew)
3. (China) Xun Fangying / (China) You Xiaodi (semifinals)
4. (Japan) Kotomi Takahata / (Australia) Olivia Tjandramulia (first round)

== Draw ==
=== Key ===
- Q = Qualifier
- WC = Wild card
- LL = Lucky loser
- Alt = Alternate
- SE = Special exempt
- PR = Protected ranking
- ITF = ITF entry
- JE = Junior exempt
- w/o = Walkover
- r = Retired
- d = Defaulted
- SR = Special ranking

=== Draw ===
First round
1	(China) X Han (China) Q Ye	6	6
(China) X Sun (China) W Zheng	3	2
(United States) J Cako (Uzbekistan) S Sharipova	6	7
(China) X Jiang (Hong Kong) L Zhang	4	5
3	(China) F Xun (China) X You	7^{7}	3	[10]
WC	(China) Xiy Wang (China) Y Zhang	6^{4}	6	[8]
(Japan) M Imanishi (India) P Thombare	7	0	[11]
WC	(China) Y He (China) C Xin	5	6	[9]
(China) H Guo (China) Xin Wang	6	6
(Serbia) N Kostić (Japan) M Ozeki	3	0
(China) S Feng (China) J Kang	6	6
4	(Japan) K Takahata (Australia) O Tjandramulia	4	2
(Japan) A Okuno (Japan) E Sema	3	7^{8}	[10]
(Japan) M Inoue (Japan) H Kaji	6	6^{6}	[6]
(India) A Raina (Japan) A Shimizu	w/o
2	(United Kingdom) N Broady (Russia) V Zvonareva

Quarterfinals
1	(China) X Han (China) Q Ye	6	7^{7}
(United States) J Cako (Uzbekistan) S Sharipova	3	6^{3}
3	(China) F Xun (China) X You	6	6
(Japan) M Imanishi (India) P Thombare	3	3
(China) H Guo (China) Xin Wang	6	1	[10]
(China) S Feng (China) J Kang	3	6	[4]
(Japan) A Okuno (Japan) E Sema	5	6	[10]
(India) A Raina (Japan) A Shimizu	7	4	[8]

Semifinals
1	(China) X Han (China) Q Ye	6	6
3	(China) F Xun (China) X You	1	4
(China) H Guo (China) Xin Wang	6	6
(Japan) A Okuno (Japan) E Sema	2	3

Final
1	(China) X Han (China) Q Ye	7^{7}	7^{8}
(China) H Guo (China) Xin Wang	6^{3}	6^{6}
