= 2011 Ningbo Challenger – Men's doubles =

Men's doubles
- 2011 Ningbo Challenger

Final
- Champions: (India) Karan Rastogi (India) Divij Sharan
- Runners-up: (Czech Republic) Jan Hernych (Estonia) Jürgen Zopp
- Score: 3–6, 7–6^{(7–3)}, [13–11]

Events
Singles	men	women
Doubles	men	women
- Ningbo Challenger

Karan Rastogi and Divij Sharan won the first edition of this tournament. They defeated Jan Hernych and Jürgen Zopp 3–6, 7–6^{(7–3)}, [13–11] in the final.

== Seeds ==
1. (Russia) Alexandre Kudryavtsev / (Ukraine) Denys Molchanov (semifinals)
2. (Canada) Pierre-Ludovic Duclos / (Italy) Riccardo Ghedin (first round)
3. (United States) John Paul Fruttero / (Indonesia) Christopher Rungkat (first round)
4. (Chinese Taipei) Hsieh Cheng-peng / (Chinese Taipei) Yang Tsung-hua (quarterfinals)

== Draw ==
Key

- Q = Qualifier
- WC = Wild card
- LL = Lucky loser
- Alt = Alternate
- ITF = ITF entry
- PR = Protected ranking
- SR = Special ranking
- SE = Special exempt
- JE = Junior exempt
- JR = Junior Accelerator Programme entrant
- CO = College Accelerator Programme entrant
- NG = Next Gen Accelerator Program entrant
- w/o = Walkover
- r = Retired
- d = Defaulted

=== Draw ===
First round
1	(Russia) A Kudryavtsev (Ukraine) D Molchanov	6	6
WC	(China) Ma Yanan (China) Xue Feng	0	4
WC	(China) Qi Xiao (China) Zhou Zhuoqing	w/o
(South Africa) F Wolmarans (United States) M Yani
3	(United States) JP Fruttero (Indonesia) C Rungkat	3	6	[3]
(Czech Republic) J Hernych (Estonia) J Zopp	6	3	[10]
(Japan) H Kondo (France) L Walter	6	6^{3}	[10]
(Canada) É Chvojka (New Zealand) J Statham	1	7^{7}	[6]
(China) M Gong (China) Z Zhang	7^{7}	6
(South Korea) Kim Cheong-eui (South Korea) D Yoo	6^{2}	2
WC	(China) Li Yifeng (China) Wang Chuhan	5	2
4	(Chinese Taipei) C-p Hsieh (Chinese Taipei) T-h Yang	7	6
(Germany) S Rieschick (Germany) C-M Stebe	6	6
(China) Feng He (China) D Wu	4	2
(India) K Rastogi (India) D Sharan	6	6
2	(Canada) P-L Duclos (Italy) R Ghedin	4	4

Quarterfinals
1	(Russia) A Kudryavtsev (Ukraine) D Molchanov	7^{10}	7
WC	(China) Qi Xiao (China) Zhou Zhuoqing	6^{8}	5
(Czech Republic) J Hernych (Estonia) J Zopp	6	6
(Japan) H Kondo (France) L Walter	3	3
(China) M Gong (China) Z Zhang	6	6
4	(Chinese Taipei) C-p Hsieh (Chinese Taipei) T-h Yang	3	1
(Germany) S Rieschick (Germany) C-M Stebe	4	6^{4}
(India) K Rastogi (India) D Sharan	6	7^{7}

Semifinals
1	(Russia) A Kudryavtsev (Ukraine) D Molchanov	3	4
(Czech Republic) J Hernych (Estonia) J Zopp	6	6
(China) M Gong (China) Z Zhang	2	3
(India) K Rastogi (India) D Sharan	6	6

Final
(Czech Republic) J Hernych (Estonia) J Zopp	6	6^{3}	[11]
(India) K Rastogi (India) D Sharan	3	7^{7}	[13]
