= 2011 Ningbo Challenger – Men's singles =

Men's singles
- 2011 Ningbo Challenger

Final
- Champion: (Chinese Taipei) Lu Yen-hsun
- Runner-up: (Estonia) Jürgen Zopp
- Score: 6–2, 3–6, 6–1

Events
Singles	men	women
Doubles	men	women
- Ningbo Challenger

Lu Yen-hsun won the final 6–2, 3–6, 6–1 against Jürgen Zopp.

== Seeds ==
1. (Chinese Taipei) Lu Yen-hsun (champion)
2. (Germany) Rainer Schüttler (second round)
3. (Russia) Alexandre Kudryavtsev (semifinals, retired due to right knee injury)
4. (Germany) Cedrik-Marcel Stebe (semifinals, retired due to wrist pain)
5. (Estonia) Jürgen Zopp (final)
6. (United States) Michael Yani (second round)
7. (Germany) Dominik Meffert (quarterfinals)
8. (South Africa) Fritz Wolmarans (first round)

== Draw ==
Key

- Q = Qualifier
- WC = Wild card
- LL = Lucky loser
- Alt = Alternate
- ITF = ITF entry
- PR = Protected ranking
- SR = Special ranking
- SE = Special exempt
- JE = Junior exempt
- JR = Junior Accelerator Programme entrant
- CO = College Accelerator Programme entrant
- NG = Next Gen Accelerator Program entrant
- w/o = Walkover
- r = Retired
- d = Defaulted

=== Finals ===
Semifinals
1	(Chinese Taipei) Lu Yen-hsun	7	0
3	(Russia) Alexandre Kudryavtsev	6	0^{r}
4	(Germany) Cedrik-Marcel Stebe	3	1^{r}
5	(Estonia) Jürgen Zopp	6	4

Final
1	(Chinese Taipei) Lu Yen-hsun	6	3	6
4	(Estonia) Jürgen Zopp	2	6	1

=== Top half ===
First round
1	(Chinese Taipei) Y-h Lu	6	6
(India) K Rastogi	3	3
Q	(Indonesia) C Rungkat	2^{r}
(China) M Gong	5
(United Kingdom) J Milton	6	6
(Germany) S Rieschick	2	3
(Canada) É Chvojka	7^{11}	6
8	(South Africa) F Wolmarans	6^{9}	3
3	(Russia) A Kudryavtsev	7^{7}	6
(Ukraine) D Molchanov	6^{3}	4
WC	(China) Ma Yanan	4	6^{5}
(Uzbekistan) F Dustov	6	7^{7}
Q	(South Korea) D Yoo	2	4
(Italy) R Ghedin	6	6
WC	(China) Wang Chuhan	3	1
7	(Germany) D Meffert	6	6

Second round
1	(Chinese Taipei) Y-h Lu	6	6
(China) M Gong	4	1
(United Kingdom) J Milton	6	4	6
(Canada) É Chvojka	4	6	2
3	(Russia) A Kudryavtsev	7^{7}	6
(Uzbekistan) F Dustov	6^{3}	3
(Italy) R Ghedin	3	0^{r}
7	(Germany) D Meffert	6	1

Quarterfinals
1	(Chinese Taipei) Y-h Lu	6	6
(United Kingdom) J Milton	4	2
3	(Russia) A Kudryavtsev	6	6
7	(Germany) D Meffert	4	2

Semifinals
1	(Chinese Taipei) Y-h Lu	7	0
3	(Russia) A Kudryavtsev	6^{6}	0^{r}

=== Bottom half ===
First round
6	(United States) M Yani	7^{7}	6
(Japan) H Kondo	6^{4}	1
WC	(China) Feng He	2	0
(China) Z Zhang	6	6
(France) L Walter	3	6	4
(Canada) P-L Duclos	6	3	0^{r}
Q	(Slovenia) L Gregorc	1	2
4	(Germany) C-M Stebe	6	6
5	(Estonia) J Zopp	6	6
(Japan) Hiroki Moriya	4	1
Q	(New Zealand) J Statham	6	6
(Czech Republic) J Hernych	2	4
(China) D Wu	4	2
(Chinese Taipei) T-h Yang	6	6
WC	(China) Zhou Zhuoqing	1	2
2	(Germany) R Schüttler	6	6

Second round
6	(United States) M Yani	2	4
(China) Z Zhang	6	6
(France) L Walter	3	4
4	(Germany) C-M Stebe	6	6
5	(Estonia) J Zopp	6	6
Q	(New Zealand) J Statham	4	2
(Chinese Taipei) T-h Yang	6^{3}	7^{7}	6
2	(Germany) R Schüttler	7^{7}	6^{2}	4

Quarterfinals
(China) Z Zhang	6^{5}	0
4	(Germany) C-M Stebe	7^{7}	6
5	(Estonia) J Zopp	7	7^{7}
(Chinese Taipei) T-h Yang	5	6^{1}

Semifinals
4	(Germany) C-M Stebe	3	1^{r}
5	(Estonia) J Zopp	6	4
