= Jürgen Zopp =

Estonian tennis player (born 1988)

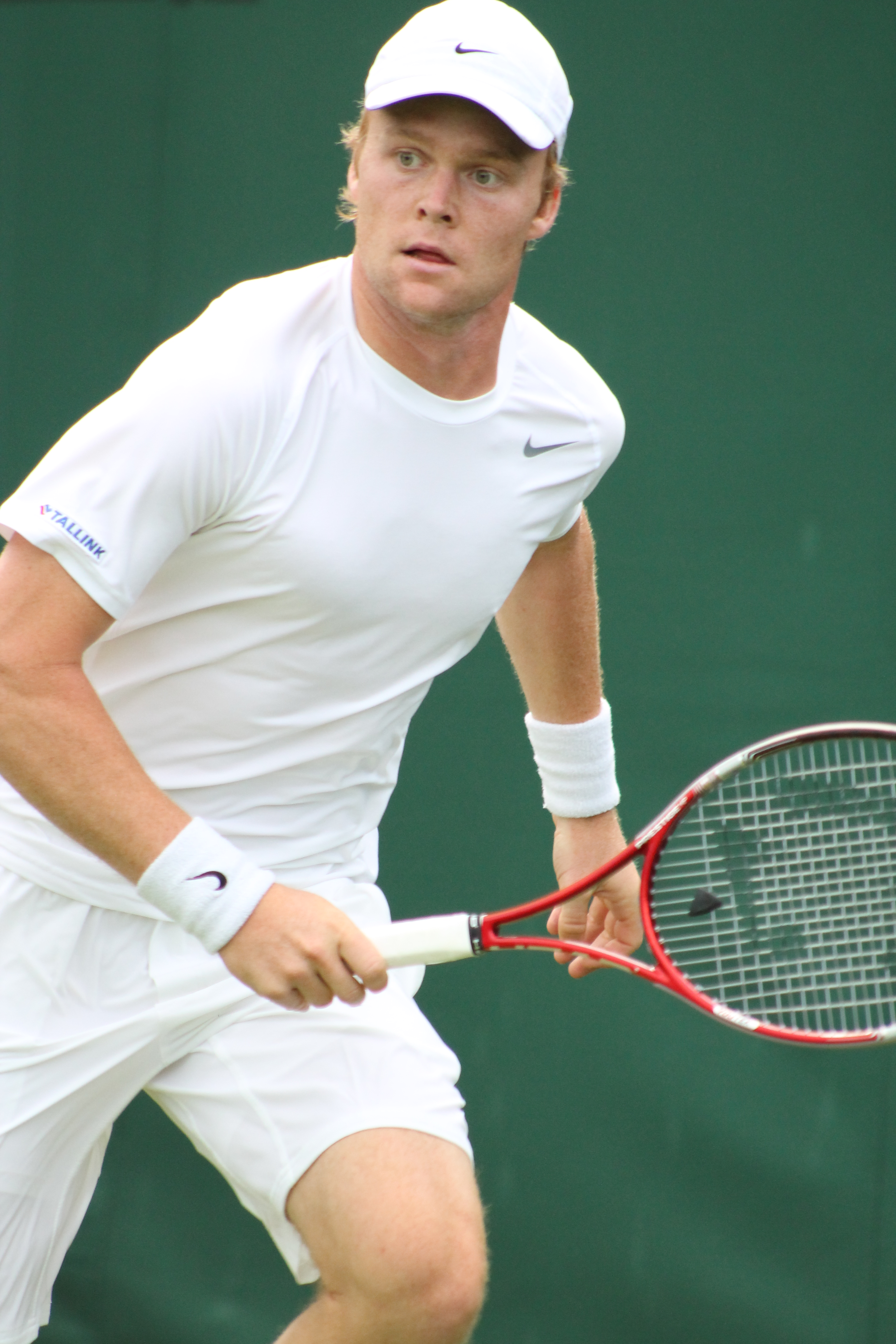
- Zopp at the 2013 Wimbledon Championships
- Country (sports): Estonia
- Residence: Tallinn, Estonia
- Born: 29 March 1988 (age 38) Tallinn, then part of Estonian SSR, Soviet Union
- Height: 1.91 m (6 ft 3 in)
- Turned pro: 2008
- Retired: 2020 (2023 last match)
- Plays: Right-handed (two-handed backhand)
- Prize money: $1,120,622

Singles
- Career record: 27–39
- Career titles: 0
- Highest ranking: No. 71 (10 September 2012)

Grand Slam singles results
- Australian Open: 1R (2012)
- French Open: 3R (2018)
- Wimbledon: 1R (2012, 2013, 2014)
- US Open: 2R (2012)

Doubles
- Career record: 7–4
- Career titles: 0
- Highest ranking: No. 218 (11 July 2016)

Grand Slam doubles results
- Wimbledon: Q1 (2012)
- US Open: 1R (2012)

Team competitions
- Davis Cup: 45–19
- Last updated on: 16 February 2023.

Jürgen Zopp (born 29 March 1988) is an Estonian retired tennis player. He is Estonia's all-time highest ranked male tennis player with a career-high singles ranking of World No. 71 in 2012.

== Career ==
Zopp started playing tennis at the age of 6 and grew up idolizing Pete Sampras, Marat Safin, and Roger Federer. Zopp had a somewhat successful junior career, reaching the second round of the Australian and US Open Boys' tournaments in 2006. In 2008, he would officially turn pro.

Zopp made a breakthrough on the ATP tour in 2012, qualifying for the main draws of the Australian Open, Roland-Garros and Wimbledon boosting his ranking to the point where he didn't have to go through qualifying by the time the US Open came around. and achieving his first main draw ATP tournament win at the 2012 Bucharest Open establishing himself as a top-100 player in the ATP rankings at world No. 71.

2013–2014 would see a huge dip in form and rankings as his ranking plummeted all the way down to the 300s in 2014. Early 2017 would be the lowest of his career as his ranking dropped to 500 on 12 June 2017. Late 2017 would see a steady increase of form and rankings grabbing a handful of challenger and ITF finals. However still struggling to even qualify for an ATP event.

In qualifying for the 2018 French Open he defeated Thanasi Kokkinakis. Although he lost in the final round of qualifying to Denis Kudla it was enough for him to make the main draw as a lucky loser. In the first round he defeated American seed Jack Sock for his sixth tour level win on clay. He then defeated fellow lucky loser Ruben Bemelmans despite losing the first two sets, therefore reaching a career-best third round at Grand Slam events. He was the first Estonian player to reach the third round of a Grand Slam. His run ended in the third round following a defeat to Maximilian Marterer.

At the 2018 Swiss Open Gstaad, he defeated the 1st seed Fabio Fognini and made it all the way to the semifinals before losing to Matteo Berrettini. 2018 is considered by some to be the best year of his career as he returned to the top 100 for the first time since 2012 and started consistently qualifying for ATP events again.

2019 would see a dip in form and rankings again. He failed to make an ATP event or a challenger final the entire year and his ranking dropped back down to the 400s again by the end of the year.

On 18 December 2020, Zopp announced his retirement from professional tennis.

Between 2022 and 2023 Zopp appeared in 3 Davis Cup matches (1 singles and 2 doubles), winning them all.

== Grand Slam performance timeline ==
Key
W	F	SF	QF	#R	RR	Q#	DNQ	A	NH

(W) winner; (F) finalist; (SF) semifinalist; (QF) quarterfinalist; (#R) rounds 4, 3, 2, 1; (RR) round-robin stage; (Q#) qualification round; (DNQ) did not qualify; (A) absent; (NH) not held; (SR) strike rate (events won / competed); (W–L) win–loss record.

Tournament	2011	2012	2013	2014	2015	2016	2017	2018	2019	SR	W–L	Win %
Grand Slam tournaments
Australian Open	Q1	1R	A	A	Q1	Q2	A	Q1	A	0 / 1	0–1	0%
French Open	Q1	1R	1R	2R	Q2	Q1	A	3R	Q1	0 / 4	3–4	43%
Wimbledon	Q3	1R	1R	1R	Q2	Q1	A	Q2	Q1	0 / 3	0–3	0%
US Open	Q1	2R	1R	A	Q2	Q1	A	Q1	A	0 / 2	1–2	33%
Win–loss	0–0	1–4	0–3	1–2	0–0	0–0	0–0	2–1	0–0	0 / 9	4–10	28.57%
ATP World Tour Masters 1000
Indian Wells Masters	A	Q2	A	A	A	A	A	A	Q1	0 / 0	0–0	N/A
Miami Masters	A	Q1	A	A	A	A	A	A	A	0 / 0	0–0	N/A
Monte-Carlo Masters	A	A	A	A	Q1	A	A	A	A	0 / 0	0–0	N/A
Madrid Masters	A	A	A	A	A	A	A	Q1	A	0 / 0	0–0	N/A
Canada Masters	A	1R	A	A	A	A	A	A	A	0 / 1	0–1	0%
Win–loss	0–0	0–1	0–0	0–0	0–0	0–0	0–0	0–0	0–0	0 / 1	0–1	0%

== ATP Challenger and ITF Futures finals ==
=== Singles: 24 (18–6) ===
Legend ATP Challenger (3–3) ITF Futures (15–3)	Finals by surface Hard (5–5) Clay (12–1) Grass (0–0) Carpet (1–0)

Result	W–L	Date	Tournament	Tier	Surface	Opponent	Score
Win	1–0	Aug 2008	Finland F1, Vierumäki	Futures	Clay	(Finland) Timo Nieminen	6–4, 6–2
Win	2–0	Mar 2009	Switzerland F2, Greifensee	Futures	Carpet	(Austria) Philipp Oswald	6–3, 6–7^{(5–7)}, 6–3
Win	3–0	Jul 2009	Estonia F1, Tallinn	Futures	Clay	(Estonia) Jaak Poldma	3–6, 6–3, 6–4
Win	4–0	Apr 2010	Turkey F7, Adana	Futures	Clay	(France) Augustin Gensse	6–2, 4–6, 6–4
Win	5–0	Apr 2010	Turkey F8, Tarsus	Futures	Clay	(Belgium) Alexandre Folie	6–3, 6–1
Win	6–0	May 2010	Czech Republic F1, Teplice	Futures	Clay	(Germany) Alexander Flock	4–6, 6–2, 7–5
Win	7–0	Jul 2010	Estonia F2, Tallinn	Futures	Clay	(Finland) Timo Nieminen	6–3, 3–6, 6–3
Win	8–0	Oct 2010	Great Britain F17, Cardiff	Futures	Hard	(United Kingdom) Dan Evans	6–4, 7–5
Win	9–0	Jul 2011	Estonia F1, Tallinn	Futures	Clay	(Chile) Hans Podlipnik Castillo	6–3, 6–3
Loss	9–1	Sep 2011	Ningbo, China	Challenger	Hard	(Chinese Taipei) Yen-Hsun Lu	2–6, 6–3, 1–6
Loss	9–2	Sep 2011	Tashkent, Uzbekistan	Challenger	Hard	(Uzbekistan) Denis Istomin	4–6, 3–6
Win	10–2	Feb 2012	Kazan, Russia	Challenger	Hard	(Romania) Marius Copil	7–6^{(7–4)}, 7–6^{(7–4)}
Win	11–2	Sep 2014	Sweden F4, Danderyd	Futures	Hard	(United States) Peter Kobelt	7–6^{(8–6)}, 6–4
Loss	11–3	Oct 2014	Sweden F6, Jönköping	Futures	Hard	(United Kingdom) Edward Corrie	6–3, 3–6, 3–6
Win	12–3	Nov 2014	Estonia F4, Tallinn	Futures	Hard	(Russia) Evgeny Elistratov	6–1, 6–4
Win	13–3	Nov 2014	Helsinki, Finland	Challenger	Hard	(Israel) Dudi Sela	6–4, 5–7, 7–6^{(8–6)}
Loss	13–4	Oct 2015	Ningbo, China	Challenger	Hard	(Chinese Taipei) Yen-Hsun Lu	6–7^{(3–7)}, 1–6
Win	14–4	Jul 2017	Germany F8, Kassel	Futures	Clay	(United Kingdom) Jan Choinski	6–3, 6–2
Win	15–4	Jul 2017	Estonia F1, Pärnu	Futures	Clay	(Germany) George Von Massow	6–1, 6–3
Loss	15–5	Aug 2017	Finland F2, Hyvinkaa	Futures	Clay	(Belgium) Julien Cagnina	6–0, 5–7, 0–6
Win	16–5	Aug 2017	Finland F3, Helsinki	Futures	Clay	(Italy) Filippo Baldi	6–4, 6–0
Win	17–5	Sep 2017	Alphen aan den Rijn, Netherlands	Challenger	Clay	(Spain) Tommy Robredo	6–3, 6–2
Loss	17–6	Oct 2017	Sweden F4, Falun	Futures	Hard	(Netherlands) Tallon Griekspoor	4–6, 1–6
Win	18–6	Jul 2019	M15 Pärnu, Estonia	World Tennis Tour	Clay	(Russia) Bogdan Bobrov	6–4, 6–3

=== Doubles: 13 (4–9) ===
Legend ATP Challenger (2–2) ITF Futures (2–7)	Finals by surface Hard (1–4) Clay (3–4) Grass (0–0) Carpet (0–1)

Result	W–L	Date	Tournament	Tier	Surface	Partner	Opponents	Score
Loss	0–1	Aug 2007	Latvia F1, Jūrmala	Futures	Clay	(Estonia) Mait Künnap	(Czech Republic) Dušan Karol (Russia) Mikhail Vasiliev	3–6, 6–7^{(3–7)}
Loss	0–2	Mar 2008	Italy F6, Monterotondo	Futures	Clay	(Russia) Mikhail Vasiliev	(North Macedonia) L Magdinchev (North Macedonia) P Rusevski	6–3, 4–6, [5–10]
Win	1–2	Jun 2008	Poland F4, Koszalin	Futures	Clay	(Poland) Artur Romanowski	(Poland) Marek Mrozek (Poland) Mateusz Szmigiel	7–5, 6–3
Loss	1–3	Feb 2009	Israel F2, Eilat	Futures	Hard	(Netherlands) Tim Van Terheijden	(Israel) Harel Levy (Israel) Noam Okun	3–6, 0–6
Loss	1–4	Apr 2009	Turkey F6, Antalya	Futures	Hard	(Estonia) Mait Künnap	(Germany) Martin Emmrich (Finland) Juho Paukku	3–6, 4–6
Win	2–4	Jul 2009	Estonia F1, Tallinn	Futures	Clay	(Estonia) Mait Künnap	(Estonia) Mikk Irdoja (Estonia) Jaak Poldma	6–4, 6–4
Loss	2–5	Mar 2010	Switzerland F2, Wetzikon	Futures	Carpet	(Italy) Walter Trusendi	(Germany) Kevin Krawietz (Germany) Marcel Zimmermann	2–6, 6–3, [5–10]
Loss	2–6	May 2010	Czech Republic F1, Teplice	Futures	Clay	(Chile) Ricardo Urzua-Rivera	(Czech Republic) Jan Mertl (Poland) Grzegorz Panfil	3–6, 4–6
Loss	2–7	Sep 2011	Ningbo, China	Challenger	Hard	(Czech Republic) Jan Hernych	(Hong Kong) Karan Rastogi (India) Divij Sharan	6–3, 6–7^{(3–7)}, [11–13]
Win	3–7	May 2012	Tunis, Tunisia	Challenger	Clay	(Poland) Jerzy Janowicz	(United States) Nicholas Monroe (Germany) Simon Stadler	7–6^{(7–1)}, 6–3
Loss	3–8	Aug 2013	Kazan, Russia	Challenger	Hard	(Slovakia) Ivo Klec	(Russia) Victor Baluda (Russia) K Kravchuk	3–6, 4–6
Win	4–8	Sep 2015	Nanchang, China	Challenger	Hard	(France) Jonathan Eysseric	(Chinese Taipei) Lee Hsin-han (Israel) Amir Weintraub	6–4, 6–2
Loss	4–9	Jul 2019	M15 Pärnu, Estonia	World Tennis Tour	Clay	(Estonia) Kenneth Raisma	(Estonia) Vladimir Ivanov (Russia) Maxim Ratniuk	6–3, 4–6, [5–10]
