= Robin Kern =

German tennis player

- Country (sports): Germany
- Residence: Nuremberg, Germany
- Born: 3 October 1993 (age 32) Nuremberg, Germany
- Height: 1.90 m (6 ft 3 in)
- Prize money: $105,494

Singles
- Career record: 0–3
- Career titles: 0
- Highest ranking: No. 350 (7 October 2013)

Doubles
- Career record: 1–5
- Career titles: 0
- Highest ranking: No. 339 (7 July 2014)

Robin Kern (German pronunciation: [ˈʁɔbɪn ˈkɛɐ̯n]; born 3 October 1993) is a German professional tennis player. He reached his career-high singles ranking of world No. 350 in October 2013.

== Career ==
Kern made his ATP World Tour debut in 2011, when he was given a wild card into the main draw of the 2011 MercedesCup. There, he lost in the first round to Fabio Fognini in straight sets. In 2012, Kern was again awarded a wild card into the main draw of the MercedesCup, where he lost to Thomaz Bellucci in the first round. In 2013, he received a wild card into the MercedesCup for the third consecutive time, losing to German qualifier Nils Langer 6–3, 4–6, 3–6 in the first round.

== Junior Grand Slam finals ==
=== Doubles: 1 (1 title) ===
| Result | Year | Tournament | Surface | Partner | Opponent | Score |
|---|---|---|---|---|---|---|
| Win | 2011 | US Open | Hard | (Germany) Julian Lenz | (Moldova) Maxim Dubarenco (Ukraine) Vladyslav Manafov | 7–5, 6–4 |

== ATP Challenger and ITF Futures finals ==
=== Singles: 16 (10–6) ===
Legend
ATP Challenger (0–0)
ITF Futures (10–6)

| Result | W–L | Date | Tournament | Tier | Surface | Opponent | Score |
|---|---|---|---|---|---|---|---|
| Win | 1–0 | May 2012 | Antalya, Turkey | Futures | Hard | (Spain) Arnau Brugués Davi | 6–3, 7–6^{(7–4)} |
| Loss | 1–1 | Aug 2012 | Innsbruck, Austria | Futures | Clay | (Austria) Patrick Ofner | 6–3, 4–6, 4–6 |
| Win | 2–1 | Oct 2012 | Heraklion, Greece | Futures | Carpet | (Switzerland) Alexander Sadecky | 6–1, 7–6^{(7–5)} |
| Loss | 2–2 | Nov 2012 | Heraklion, Greece | Futures | Carpet | (Croatia) Viktor Galović | 6–2, 6–7^{(4–7)}, 5–7 |
| Win | 3–2 | Nov 2012 | Heraklion, Greece | Futures | Carpet | (Spain) Ivan Arenas-Gualda | 6–1, 3–1, ret. |
| Win | 4–2 | Dec 2012 | Phnom Penh, Cambodia | Futures | Hard | (France) Axel Michon | 6–4, 6–4 |
| Win | 5–2 | Aug 2013 | Piombino, Italy | Futures | Hard | (Switzerland) Michael Lammer | 3–6, 7–6^{(7–4)}, 6–2 |
| Win | 6–2 | Nov 2013 | Antalya, Turkey | Futures | Hard | (Georgia (country)) Nikoloz Basilashvili | 4–6, 6–3, 6–3 |
| Loss | 6–3 | Apr 2014 | Antalya, Turkey | Futures | Hard | (France) Hugo Nys | 0–6, 2–6 |
| Win | 7–3 | May 2014 | Ashkelon, Israel | Futures | Hard | (Italy) Stefano Napolitano | 6–4, 6–1 |
| Loss | 7–4 | Oct 2015 | Oberhaching, Germany | Futures | Hard (i) | (Germany) Jeremy Jahn | 3–6, 3–6 |
| Win | 8–4 | Jul 2016 | Vienna, Austria | Futures | Clay | (Austria) Lenny Hampel | 6–4, 6–0 |
| Loss | 8–5 | Sep 2016 | Plaisir, France | Futures | Hard (i) | (France) Romain Jouan | 2–6, 2–6 |
| Loss | 8–6 | Oct 2016 | Oberhaching, Germany | Futures | Hard (i) | (Germany) Mats Moraing | 4–6, 2–6 |
| Win | 9–6 | Oct 2017 | Forbach, France | Futures | Carpet (i) | (Germany) Benjamin Hassan | 4–6, 7–5, 6–1 |
| Win | 10–6 | Oct 2017 | Oberhaching, Germany | Futures | Hard (i) | (Netherlands) Scott Griekspoor | 6–3, 7–6^{(7–4)} |

=== Doubles: 9 (8–1) ===
Legend
ATP Challenger (1–0)
ITF Futures (7–1)

| Result | W–L | Date | Tournament | Tier | Surface | Partner | Opponents | Score |
|---|---|---|---|---|---|---|---|---|
| Loss | 0–1 | Oct 2012 | Heraklion, Greece | Futures | Carpet | (Germany) Sebastian Wagner | (Canada) Milan Pokrajac (Switzerland) Alexander Sadecky | 2–6, 4–6 |
| Win | 1–1 | Nov 2013 | Antalya, Turkey | Futures | Hard | (Germany) Pirmin Hänle | (Netherlands) Kevin Griekspoor (Netherlands) Scott Griekspoor | 6–1, 6–4 |
| Win | 1–0 | Jun 2014 | Tianjin, China | Challenger | Hard | (France) Josselin Ouanna | (United States) Jason Jung (United States) Evan King | 6–7^{(3–7)}, 7–5, [10–8] |
| Win | 2–1 | Nov 2014 | Phnom Penh, Cambodia | Futures | Hard | (Germany) Sebastian Wagner | (China) Gao Xin (China) Ouyang Bowen | 3–6, 6–3, [10–5] |
| Win | 3–1 | Aug 2016 | Wetzlar, Germany | Futures | Clay | (Germany) Jannis Kahlke | (Dominican Republic) Roberto Cid Subervi (Japan) Naoki Nakagawa | 6–0, 6–2 |
| Win | 4–1 | Jul 2017 | De Haan, Belgium | Futures | Clay | (Germany) Sami Reinwein | (Chile) Simon Navarro (Chile) Marcelo Plaza | 6–1, 6–3 |
| Win | 5–1 | Jul 2017 | Wels, Austria | Futures | Clay | (Germany) Sami Reinwein | (Austria) Philipp Schroll (Uruguay) Nicolás Xiviller | 6–4, 6–3 |
| Win | 6–1 | Oct 2017 | Forbach, France | Futures | Carpet (i) | (Germany) Sami Reinwein | (France) Albano Olivetti (France) Hugo Voljacques | 3–6, 6–3, [10–5] |
| Win | 7–1 | Sep 2018 | Piombino, Italy | Futures | Hard | (Germany) Sami Reinwein | (United Kingdom) Luke Johnson (Sweden) Fred Simonsson | 4–6, 6–4, [10–6] |
