= Wang Yan (tennis) =

Chinese tennis player

Wang Yan 王妍
- Country (sports): China
- Born: 1 January 1996 (age 29)
- Plays: Right (two-handed backhand)
- Prize money: $45,576

Singles
- Career record: 111–90
- Career titles: 2 ITF
- Highest ranking: No. 359 (23 March 2015)

Grand Slam singles results
- US Open Junior: Q1 (2013)

Doubles
- Career record: 71–69
- Career titles: 4 ITF
- Highest ranking: No. 220 (1 May 2017)

Wang Yan (Chinese: 王妍; pinyin: Wáng Yán; Mandarin pronunciation: [wǎŋ jɛ̌n]; born 1 January 1996; nickname: Helen) is a Chinese former professional tennis player.

On 23 March 2015, she reached her best singles ranking of world No. 359. On 1 May 2017, she peaked at No. 220 in the WTA doubles rankings. In her career, Wang won two singles titles and four doubles titles on tournaments of the ITF Circuit.

She made her WTA Tour main-draw debut at the 2015 Tianjin Open where she was given a wildcard into the doubles tournament, partnering Xun Fangying.

== ITF Circuit finals ==
=== Singles: 3 (2 titles, 1 runner-up) ===
Legend $25,000 tournaments $10,000 tournaments	Finals by surface Hard (2–1) Clay (0–0)

Result	No.	Date	Tournament	Surface	Opponent	Score
Loss	1.	7 June 2014	ITF Tarakan, Indonesia	Hard	(China) Zhu Lin	6–4, 0–6, 2–6
Win	1.	10 July 2016	ITF Gimcheon, South Korea	Hard	(South Korea) Park Sang-hee	4–6, 6–2, 6–4
Win	2.	16 July 2016	ITF Gimcheon	Hard	(South Korea) Choi Ji-hee	6–4, 7–6^{(1)}

=== Doubles: 8 (4 titles, 4 runner-ups) ===
Legend $50,000 tournaments $15,000 tournaments $10,000 tournaments	Finals by surface Hard (4–3) Grass (0–1)

Result	No.	Date	Tournament	Surface	Partner	Opponents	Score
Loss	1.	24 March 2014	ITF Shenzhen, China	Hard	(China) Gai Ao	(China) Han Xinyun (China) Zhang Kailin	0–6, 3–6
Win	1.	11 August 2014	ITF Istanbul, Turkey	Hard	(China) You Xiaodi	(China) Gao Xinyu (China) Yang Zhaoxuan	w/o
Loss	2.	25 August 2014	ITF Antalya, Turkey	Hard	(China) Yang Zhaoxuan	(Ukraine) Alona Fomina (Germany) Christina Shakovets	3–6, 1–6
Win	2.	22 September 2014	ITF Antalya, Turkey	Hard	(China) You Xiaodi	(United Kingdom) Harriet Dart (United Kingdom) Jessica Simpson	6–1, 3–6, [10–8]
Loss	3.	15 March 2015	ITF Mildura, Australia	Grass	(China) Tian Ran	(Japan) Hiroko Kuwata (Japan) Yuuki Tanaka	2–6, 0–6
Loss	4.	20 September 2015	ITF Antalya, Turkey	Hard	(Poland) Agata Barańska	(South Africa) Ilze Hattingh (Slovakia) Chantal Škamlová	6–7^{(3)}, 6–3, [2–10]
Win	3.	6 March 2016	ITF Nanjing, China	Hard	(China) Li Yihong	(China) Chen Jiahui (China) Xin Yuan	6–2, 6–3
Win	4.	28 May 2016	ITF Tianjin, China	Hard	(China) Li Yihong	(China) Liu Wanting (China) Lu Jingjing	1–6, 6–0, [10–4]
