= Li Yihong =

Chinese tennis player

Li Yihong 李怡泓
- Country (sports): China
- Born: 9 July 1996 (age 28)
- Plays: Right (two-handed backhand)
- Prize money: $16,091

Singles
- Career record: 21–48
- Career titles: 0
- Highest ranking: No. 1203 (27 April 2015)

Doubles
- Career record: 95–64
- Career titles: 9 ITF
- Highest ranking: No. 286 (22 May 2017)

Li Yihong (Chinese: 李怡泓; pinyin: Lǐ Yíhóng Mandarin pronunciation: [lì ǐ xʊ̌ŋ];; born 9 July 1996) is a Chinese former tennis player.

Li, who has been more successful in doubles, won nine doubles titles on the ITF Women's Circuit in her career. Her biggest win she realized at the $50k event in Tianjin, partnering with Wang Yan, defeating Liu Wanting and Lu Jingjing in the final.

On 22 May 2017, Li achieved a career-high doubles ranking of world No. 286.

== ITF Circuit finals ==
=== Doubles: 16 (9 titles, 7 runner-ups) ===
Legend
$50,000 tournaments
$25,000 tournaments
$15,000 tournaments
$10,000 tournaments

| Result | No. | Date | Tournament | Surface | Partner | Opponents | Score |
|---|---|---|---|---|---|---|---|
| Loss | 1. | 18 February 2012 | ITF Antalya, Turkey | Clay | (China) Tang Haochen | (China) Yang Zhaoxuan (China) Zhang Kailin | 6–7^{(6–8)}, 7–5, [8–10] |
| Win | 1. | 8 July 2012 | ITF Huzhu, China | Clay | (China) Zhang Kailin | (China) Tian Ran (China) Wang Yafan | 3–6, 6–4, [10–6] |
| Loss | 2. | 13 July 2012 | ITF Huzhu, China | Clay | (China) Tian Ran | (China) Li Ting (China) Liang Chen | 5–7, 6–3, [6–10] |
| Loss | 3. | 14 December 2012 | ITF Bangkok, Thailand | Hard | (Vietnam) Huỳnh Phương Đài Trang | (China) Wang Yafan (China) Wen Xin | 0–6, 3–6 |
| Win | 2. | 11 January 2013 | ITF Hong Kong | Hard | (China) Wen Xin | (Japan) Eri Hozumi (Japan) Miyu Kato | 4–6, 6–1, [12–10] |
| Win | 3. | 16 February 2014 | ITF Antalya, Turkey | Hard | (China) Zhu Lin | (Romania) Gabriela Talabă (Romania) Patricia Maria Țig | 6–2, ret. |
| Loss | 4. | 22 February 2014 | ITF Antalya | Clay | (China) Yang Zhaoxuan | (Austria) Pia König (Georgia (country)) Sofia Kvatsabaia | 1–2 ret. |
| Win | 4. | 1 March 2014 | ITF Antalya | Hard | (China) Zhu Lin | (Romania) Nicoleta Dascălu (Romania) Raluca Șerban | 3–6, 6–3, [10–3] |
| Loss | 5. | 13 March 2015 | ITF Jiangmen, China | Hard | (Chinese Taipei) Lee Pei-chi | (South Korea) Choi Ji-hee (South Korea) Kim Na-ri | 6–4, 2–6, [9–11] |
| Loss | 6. | 19 June 2015 | ITF Anning, China | Clay | (China) Tang Qianhui | (China) Gao Xinyu (China) Zhang Ying | 4–6, 2–6 |
| Loss | 7. | 25 December 2015 | ITF Hong Kong | Hard | (China) Jiang Xinyu | (Finland) Emma Laine (Japan) Yukina Saigo | 1–6, 1–6 |
| Win | 5. | 4 March 2016 | ITF Nanjing, China | Hard | (China) Wang Yan | (China) Chen Jiahui (China) Xin Yuan | 6–2, 6–3 |
| Win | 6. | 28 May 2016 | ITF Tianjin, China | Hard | (China) Wang Yan | (China) Liu Wanting (China) Lu Jingjing | 1–6, 6–0, [10–4] |
| Win | 7. | 12 June 2016 | ITF Anning, China | Clay | (China) Xin Yuan | (China) Kang Jiaqi (China) Sun Xuliu | 5–7, 6–4, [10–8] |
| Win | 8. | 24 February 2017 | ITF Nanjing, China | Hard | (China) Zhang Ying | (China) Guo Hanyu (China) Tang Haochen | 5–7, 6–3, [10–3] |
| Win | 9. | 7 July 2017 | ITF Anning, China | Clay | (China) Feng Shuo | (China) Jiang Xinyu (China) Tang Qianhui | 6–3, 6–4 |
