= Chen Jiahui =

Chinese tennis player

- Native name: 陈佳慧
- Country (sports): China
- Born: 26 May 1995 (age 29)
- Prize money: $31,279

Singles
- Career record: 90–91
- Career titles: 0
- Highest ranking: No. 628 (26 September 2016)

Doubles
- Career record: 80–83
- Career titles: 4 ITF
- Highest ranking: No. 353 (12 August 2019)

Chen Jiahui (Chinese: 陈佳慧; pinyin: Chén Jiāhuì; born 26 May 1995) is a Chinese former professional tennis player.

== Career ==
On 26 September 2016, Chen achieved a career-high singles ranking of world No. 628. On 12 August 2019, she peaked at No. 353 in the WTA doubles rankings. She won four doubles titles on tournaments of the ITF Circuit in her career.

Chen made her WTA Tour main-draw debut at the 2019 Shenzhen Open in the doubles tournament, partnering Wang Danni.

== ITF Circuit finals ==
=== Doubles: 10 (4 titles, 6 runner-ups) ===
Legend $25,000 tournaments $15,000 tournaments $10,000 tournaments	Finals by surface Hard (2–6) Clay (2–0)

Result	No.	Date	Tournament	Surface	Partner	Opponents	Score
Win	1.	26 June 2015	ITF Anning, China	Clay	(China) Xin Yuan	(China) Gai Ao (China) Sheng Yuqi	6–0, 6–4
Loss	1.	17 July 2015	ITF Tianjin, China	Hard	(China) You Xiaodi	(China) Liu Wanting (China) Lu Jingjing	7–6^{(4)}, 6–7^{(3)}, [4–10]
Loss	2.	4 March 2016	ITF Nanjing, China	Hard	(China) Xin Yuan	(China) Li Yihong (China) Wang Yan	2–6, 3–6
Win	2.	18 June 2016	ITF Anning, China	Clay	(China) Xin Yuan	(China) Kang Jiaqi (China) Sun Xuliu	6–4, 7–6^{(3)}
Win	3.	5 May 2017	ITF Hua Hin, Thailand	Hard	(China) Zhang Ying	(Oman) Fatma Al-Nabhani (Japan) Chihiro Muramatsu	6–4, 6–1
Win	4.	6 April 2018	ITF Nanjing, China	Hard	(China) Zheng Wushuang	(China) Sun Xuliu (China) Zhao Qianqian	7–6^{(2)}, 6–1
Loss	3.	14 July 2018	ITF Tianjin, China	Hard	(China) Ye Qiuyu	(China) Feng Shuo (China) Jiang Xinyu	4–6, 4–6
Loss	4.	17 August 2018	ITF Guiyang, China	Hard	(China) Yuan Yue	(China) Kang Jiaqi (China) Xun Fangying	6–3, 5–7, [6–10]
Loss	5.	8 June 2019	ITF Shenzhen, China	Hard	(China) Wu Meixu	(China) Guo Hanyu (China) Ye Qiuyu	6–1, 6–7^{(4)}, [9–11]
Loss	6.	29 June 2019	ITF Naiman, China	Hard	(China) Zheng Wushuang	(China) Guo Meiqi (China) Wu Meixu	4–6, 6–7^{(5)}
