= Han Xinyun =

Chinese tennis player

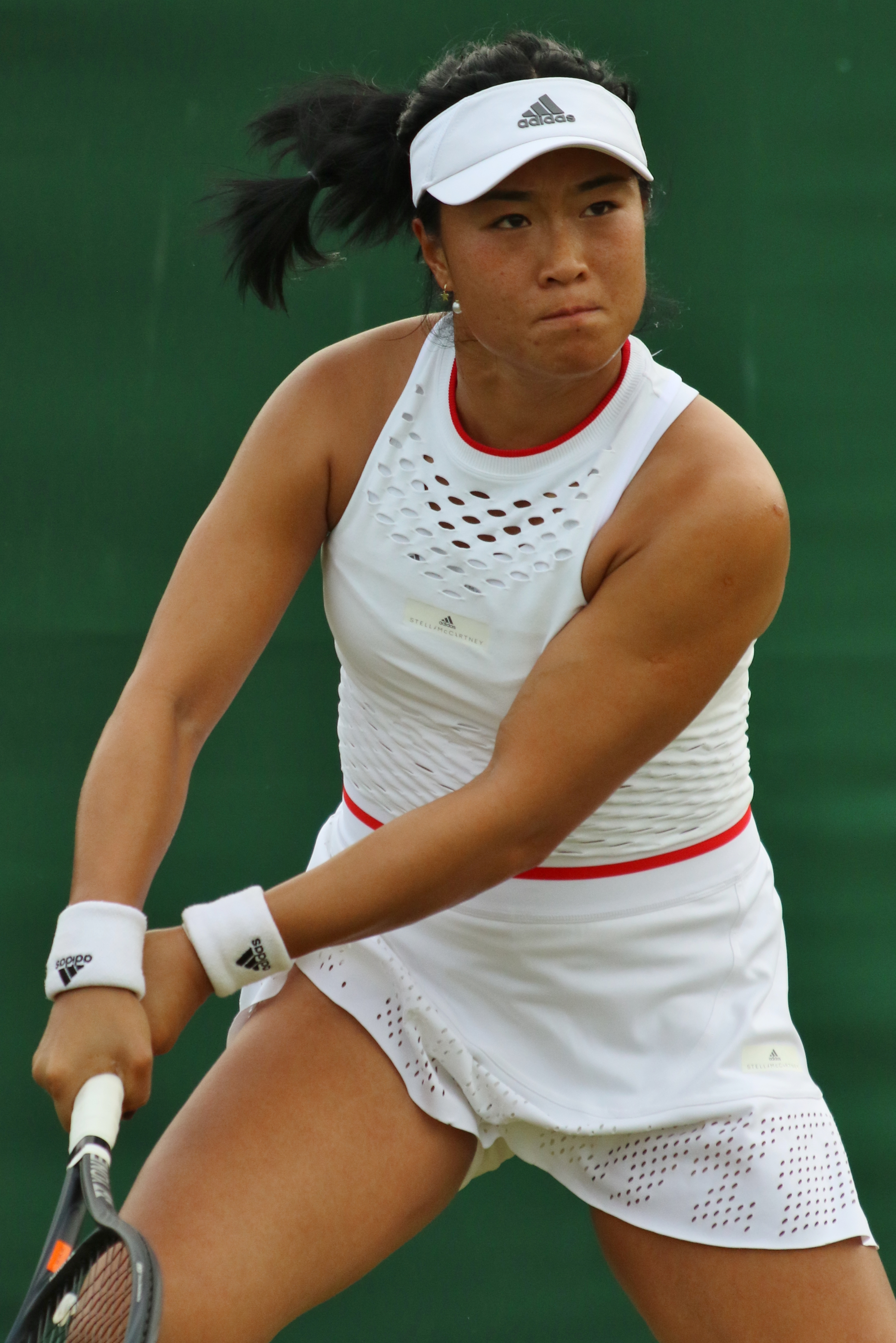
- Han at the 2019 Wimbledon qualifying
- Country (sports): China
- Residence: Hangzhou, China
- Born: 30 May 1990 (age 36) Jinzhou, China
- Height: 1.72 m (5 ft 8 in)
- Turned pro: 2006
- Plays: Left (two-handed backhand)
- Prize money: $1,369,060

Singles
- Career record: 383–324
- Career titles: 0 WTA, 9 ITF
- Highest ranking: No. 105 (24 October 2016)

Grand Slam singles results
- Australian Open: 2R (2016)
- French Open: Q2 (2010)
- Wimbledon: 1R (2017)
- US Open: Q3 (2016)

Doubles
- Career record: 393–263
- Career titles: 3 WTA, 1 WTA Challenger
- Highest ranking: No. 50 (29 July 2019)

Grand Slam doubles results
- Australian Open: 2R (2013, 2019, 2022)
- French Open: 2R (2019, 2022)
- Wimbledon: 2R (2018, 2019, 2022)
- US Open: 2R (2018)

Grand Slam mixed doubles results
- Australian Open: 1R (2023)

Han Xinyun (Chinese: 韩馨蕴; pinyin: Hán Xīnyùn; Mandarin pronunciation: [xǎn ɕín ŷn]; born 30 May 1990), also known as Monica Han, is a Chinese former tennis player.

Han won three doubles titles on the WTA Tour, as well as one doubles title on the WTA Challenger Tour. In addition, she won 35 titles (9 in singles and 26 in doubles) on the ITF Women's Circuit. On 24 October 2016, she reached her best singles ranking of world No. 105. On 29 July 2019, she peaked at No. 50 in the WTA doubles rankings.

Playing for China Fed Cup team, Han recorded a win–loss record of 2–1.

== Personal ==
The only child of father Han Lei and mother Fu Deyuan first played tennis at the age of seven. Han Xinyun is coached by Wang Hufu. Her tennis idol is Li Na, her favorite tournaments are the Australian Open and China Open.

== Career ==
Han again reached the WTA Tour doubles final at the 2008 China Open where she and her partner Xu Yifan lost to the pairing of Caroline Wozniacki and Anabel Medina Garrigues. She had reached the same final with the same partner the year before, in 2007.

In 2010, Han made her major debut, as she went through qualifying to reach the first round of the Australian Open. Also, she made her Fed Cup debut, in which she helped China get its only singles rubber win against Slovakia.

In 2016, she won her first doubles title on the WTA Tour at the Hobart International, partnering Christina McHale and defeating Kimberly Birrell and Jarmila Wolfe, in straight sets.

== Performance timelines ==
Key
W	F	SF	QF	#R	RR	Q#	DNQ	A	NH

(W) winner; (F) finalist; (SF) semifinalist; (QF) quarterfinalist; (#R) rounds 4, 3, 2, 1; (RR) round-robin stage; (Q#) qualification round; (DNQ) did not qualify; (A) absent; (NH) not held; (SR) strike rate (events won / competed); (W–L) win–loss record.
To avoid confusion and double counting, these charts are updated at the conclusion of a tournament or when the player's participation has ended.

=== Singles ===
Tournament	2009	2010	2011	...	2014	2015	2016	2017	2018	2019	2020	2021	2022	SR	W–L
Grand Slam tournaments
Australian Open	A	1R	Q1		A	A	2R	1R	Q2	Q1	Q1	A	Q1	0 / 3	1–3
French Open	A	Q2	Q1		A	A	Q1	Q1	Q1	A	A	A	Q1	0 / 0	0–0
Wimbledon	A	Q2	Q1		A	A	Q1	1R	Q1	Q1	NH	A	A	0 / 1	0–1
US Open	Q1	Q2	Q1		A	Q2	Q3	Q1	Q1	Q1	A	A	A	0 / 0	0–0
Win–loss	0–0	0–1	0–0		0–0	0–0	1–1	0–2	0–0	0–0	0–0	0–0	0–0	0 / 4	1–4
WTA 1000
Qatar / Dubai Open (Note: The first Premier 5 event of the year has switched back and forth between the Dubai Tennis Championships and the Qatar Ladies Open since 2009. The Dubai Championships were classified as a Premier 5 event from 2009 to 2011 before being succeeded by the Qatar Open for the 2012–2014 period. In 2015, the Dubai Championships regained its Premier 5 status while the Qatar Open was demoted to Premier status. The two tournaments have since alternated status every year.)	A	A	A		A	A	A	A	Q1	Q1	Q1	A	A	0 / 0	0–0
Indian Wells Open	A	A	Q1		A	A	Q2	A	A	A	NH	A	A	0 / 0	0–0
Miami Open	A	A	A		A	A	Q1	A	A	A	NH	A	A	0 / 0	0–0
Madrid Open	A	A	A		A	A	A	Q1	A	A	NH	A	A	0 / 0	0–0
Italian Open	A	A	A		A	A	A	A	A	A	A	A	Q1	0 / 0	0–0
Wuhan Open	A	A	A		A	2R	2R	Q1	Q1	Q2	NH			0 / 2	2–2
China Open	1R	1R	2R		Q1	1R	Q2	Q1	A	Q1	NH			0 / 4	1–4
Career statistics
Year-end ranking (Note: 2012: WTA ranking–292, 2013: WTA ranking–385.)	184	132	328		278	152	108	130	162	195	206	487	749	$1,192,027	

=== Doubles ===
Tournament	2013	2014	2015	2016	2017	2018	2019	2020	2021	2022	2023	W–L
Australian Open	2R	1R	A	A	A	1R	2R	2R	A	2R	1R	4–7
French Open	A	A	A	1R	A	A	2R	A	A	2R	A	2–3
Wimbledon	A	A	Q1	1R	1R	2R	2R	NH	A	2R	A	3–5
US Open	A	A	A	1R	A	2R	1R	A	A	1R	A	1–4
Win–loss	1–1	0–1	0–0	0–3	0–1	2–3	3–4	1–1	0–0	3–4	0–1	10–19

== Significant finals ==
=== WTA Elite Trophy ===
==== Doubles: 1 (title) ====
Result	Year	Location	Surface	Partner	Opponents	Score
Win	2017	Zhuhai, China	Hard (i)	(China) Duan Yingying	(China) Zhang Shuai (China) Lu Jingjing	6–2, 6–1

== WTA Tour finals ==
=== Doubles: 10 (3 titles, 7 runner-ups) ===
Legend WTA Elite Trophy (1–0) Premier / WTA 500 (0–2) International / WTA 250 (2–5)	Finals by surface Hard (3–5) Clay (0–2)

Result	W–L	Date	Tournament	Tier	Surface	Partner	Opponents	Score
Loss	0–1	Sep 2007	China Open	Tier II	Hard	(China) Xu Yifan	(Chinese Taipei) Chuang Chia-jung (Chinese Taipei) Hsieh Su-wei	6–7^{(3–7)}, 3–6
Loss	0–2	Sep 2008	China Open	Tier II	Hard	(China) Xu Yifan	(Spain) Anabel Medina Garrigues (Denmark) Caroline Wozniacki	1–6, 3–6
Loss	0–3	Sep 2010	Guangzhou Open, China	International	Hard	(China) Liu Wanting	(India) Sania Mirza (Romania) Edina Gallovits	5–7, 3–6
Loss	0–4	Sep 2011	Guangzhou Open, China	International	Hard	(Chinese Taipei) Chan Chin-wei	(Chinese Taipei) Hsieh Su-wei (China) Zheng Saisai	2–6, 1–6
Win	1–4	Jan 2016	Hobart International, Australia	International	Hard	(United States) Christina McHale	(Australia) Kimberly Birrell (Australia) Jarmila Wolfe	6–3, 6–0
Win	2–4	Nov 2017	Elite Trophy Zhuhai, China	Elite	Hard (i)	(China) Duan Yingying	(China) Lu Jingjing (China) Zhang Shuai	6–2, 6–1
Win	3–4	Aug 2018	Washington Open, United States	International	Hard	(Croatia) Darija Jurak	(Chile) Alexa Guarachi (New Zealand) Erin Routliffe	6–3, 6–2
Loss	3–5	May 2019	Internationaux de Strasbourg, France	International	Clay	(China) Duan Yingying	(Australia) Daria Gavrilova (Australia) Ellen Perez	4–6, 3–6
Loss	3–6	Jul 2019	Lausanne Open, Switzerland	International	Clay	(Australia) Monique Adamczak	(Russia) Anastasia Potapova (Russia) Yana Sizikova	2–6, 4–6
Loss	3–7	Mar 2022	Monterrey Open, Mexico	WTA 250	Hard	(Russia) Yana Sizikova	(United States) Catherine Harrison (United States) Sabrina Santamaria	6–1, 5–7, [6–10]

== WTA 125 finals ==
=== Doubles: 6 (1 title, 5 runner-ups) ===
Result	W–L	Date	Tournament	Surface	Partner	Opponents	Score
Loss	0–1	Aug 2013	Suzhou Ladies Open, China	Hard	(Japan) Eri Hozumi	(Hungary) Tímea Babos (Netherlands) Michaëlla Krajicek	2–6, 2–6
Loss	0–2	Oct 2014	Ningbo International, China	Hard	(China) Zhang Kailin	(Australia) Arina Rodionova (Ukraine) Olga Savchuk	6–4, 6–7^{(2–7)}, [6–10]
Win	1–2	Apr 2017	Zhengzhou Open, China	Hard	(China) Zhu Lin	(United States) Jacqueline Cako (Israel) Julia Glushko	7–5, 6–1
Loss	1–3	Apr 2019	Kunming Open, China	Clay	(China) Duan Yingying	(China) Peng Shuai (China) Yang Zhaoxuan	5–7, 2–6
Loss	1–4	Aug 2019	Karlsruhe Open, Germany	Clay	(China) Yuan Yue	(Spain) Lara Arruabarrena (Czech Republic) Renata Voráčová	7–6^{(7–2)}, 4–6, [4–10]
Loss	1–5	Jul 2022	Contrexéville Open, France	Clay	(Russia) Alexandra Panova	(Norway) Ulrikke Eikeri (Slovakia) Tereza Mihalíková	6–7^{(8–10)}, 2–6

== ITF Circuit finals ==
=== Singles: 18 (9 titles, 9 runner-ups) ===
Legend $100,000 tournaments $75,000 tournaments $60,000 tournaments $25,000 tournaments $10/15,000 tournaments	Finals by surface Hard (8–6) Clay (1–3)

Result	W–L	Date	Tournament	Tier	Surface	Opponent	Score
Win	1–0	Jun 2006	ITF Montemor-o-Novo, Portugal	10,000	Hard	(Portugal) Neuza Silva	6–2, 2–6, 7–5
Loss	1–1	Jun 2006	ITF Alcobaça, Portugal	10,000	Hard	(Portugal) Neuza Silva	3–6, 6–2, 5–7
Loss	1–2	Nov 2007	ITF Taizhou, China	25,000	Hard	(Belgium) Yanina Wickmayer	2–6, 2–6
Win	2–2	May 2009	ITF Incheon, South Korea	25,000	Hard	(China) Liang Chen	6–2, 6–2
Win	3–2	May 2009	ITF Goyang, South Korea	25,000	Hard	(South Korea) Lee Jin-a	7–5, 6–4
Win	4–2	Jun 2009	ITF Gimhae, South Korea	25,000	Hard	(Australia) Shannon Golds	6–1, 6–3
Loss	4–3	Jun 2009	ITF Qianshan, China	10,000	Hard	(China) Sun Shengnan	1–6, 4–6
Loss	4–4	Mar 2012	ITF Sanya, China	25,000	Hard	(China) Wang Qiang	2–6, 4–6
Win	5–4	May 2013	ITF Seoul, South Korea	15,000	Hard	(South Korea) Kim So-jung	6–2, 6–1
Win	6–4	Mar 2014	ITF Glen Iris, Australia	15,000	Clay	(United States) Tori Kinard	6–2, 6–3
Loss	6–5	Apr 2014	ITF Melbourne, Australia	15,000	Clay	(Slovakia) Zuzana Zlochová	6–3, 6–7, 4–6
Loss	6–6	May 2014	ITF Incheon, South Korea (2)	25,000	Hard	(Sweden) Susanne Celik	6–4, 3–6, 4–6
Loss	6–7	Feb 2015	ITF Aurangabad, India	25,000	Clay	(Slovenia) Dalila Jakupović	7–6^{(5)}, 4–6, 4–6
Loss	6–8	May 2015	Anning Open, China	75,000	Clay	(China) Zheng Saisai	4–6, 6–3, 4–6
Win	7–8	Feb 2016	Launceston International, Australia	75,000	Hard	(Russia) Alla Kudryavtseva	6–1, 6–1
Win	8–8	Aug 2016	ITF Naiman, China	25,000	Hard (i)	(China) Liu Fangzhou	6–4, 6–3
Loss	8–9	Apr 2018	ITF Nanjing, China	15,000	Hard	(China) Xun Fangying	4–6, 3–6
Win	9–9	May 2019	Jin'an Open, China	60,000	Hard	(China) Duan Yingying	4–6, 6–2, 6–2

=== Doubles: 45 (26 titles, 19 runner-ups) ===
Legend $100,000 tournaments $75/80,000 tournaments $50/60,000 tournaments $25,000 tournaments $10/15,000 tournaments	Finals by surface Hard (20–14) Clay (5–1) Grass (1–1) Carpet (0–3)

Result	W–L	Date	Tournament	Tier	Surface	Partner	Opponents	Score
Win	1–0	Apr 2007	ITF Ho Chi Minh City, Vietnam	25,000	Hard	(China) Hao Jie	(Japan) Kumiko Iijima (Japan) Seiko Okamoto	6–2, 1–6, 6–3
Loss	1–1	Nov 2007	Kunming Open, China	50,000	Hard	(China) Xu Yifan	(Poland) Urszula Radwańska (Belgium) Yanina Wickmayer	4–6, 1–6
Win	2–1	Nov 2007	ITF Xiamen, China	75,000	Hard	(China) Xu Yifan	(China) Ji Chunmei (China) Sun Shengnan	6–4, 7–5
Win	3–1	May 2008	ITF Caserta, Italy	25,000	Clay	(China) Xu Yifan	(Japan) Kumiko Iijima (Japan) Seiko Okamoto	4–6, 6–4, [10–8]
Loss	3–2	Jun 2008	ITF Périgueux, France	25,000	Clay	(China) Xu Yifan	(Germany) Anna-Lena Grönefeld (Turkey) İpek Şenoğlu	3–6, 4–6
Loss	3–3	Oct 2008	ITF Makinohara, Japan	25,000	Carpet	(South Korea) Chae Kyung-yee	(Japan) Natsumi Hamamura (Japan) Junri Namigata	5–7, 6–7^{(4)}
Loss	3–4	Nov 2008	Toyota World Challenge, Japan	75,000	Carpet (i)	(Japan) Kimiko Date-Krumm	(Finland) Emma Laine (United Kingdom) Melanie South	1–6, 5–7
Loss	3–5	Feb 2009	ITF Mildura, Australia	25,000	Grass	(China) Ji Chunmei	(China) Lu Jingjing (China) Sun Shengnan	6–7^{(2)}, 6–7^{(4)}
Loss	3–6	Feb 2009	ITF Guangzhou, China	10,000	Hard	(China) Sun Shengnan	(China) Ji Chunmei (China) Liang Chen	7–6^{(7)}, 2–6, [3–10]
Loss	3–7	Mar 2009	ITF Sydney, Australia	25,000	Hard	(China) Ji Chunmei	(Australia) Monique Adamczak (South Africa) Lizaan du Plessis	3–6, 5–7
Loss	3–8	May 2009	ITF Incheon, South Korea	25,000	Hard	(China) Ji Chunmei	(China) Lu Jingjing (China) Sun Shengnan	3–6, 5–7
Loss	3–9	Jun 2009	ITF Qianshan, China	10,000	Hard	(China) Qian Ying	(China) Sun Shengnan (China) Zhou Yimiao	3–6, 0–6
Loss	3–10	Jun 2009	ITF Xiamen, China (2)	25,000	Hard	(Chinese Taipei) Kao Shaoyuan	(China) Lu Jingjing (China) Sun Shengnan	2–6, 4–6
Win	4–10	Aug 2009	Blossom Cup, China	25,000	Hard	(Chinese Taipei) Kao Shaoyuan	(China) Hao Jie (China) Sun Tiantian	1–6, 6–2, [10–6]
Loss	4–11	Sep 2009	ITF Noto, Japan	25,000	Carpet	(South Korea) Kim So-jung	(Chinese Taipei) Hsu Wen-hsin (Chinese Taipei) Hwang I-hsuan	2–6, 4–6
Win	5–11	Aug 2010	Grado Tennis Cup, Italy	25,000	Clay	(China) Lu Jingjing	(Russia) Karina Pimkina (Russia) Marta Sirotkina	1–6, 6–4, [10–8]
Loss	5–12	Aug 2011	Bronx Open, United States	50,000	Hard	(China) Lu Jingjing	(United States) Megan Moulton-Levy (United States) Ahsha Rolle	3–6, 6–7^{(5)}
Loss	5–13	Sep 2011	Ningbo International, China	100,000	Hard	(Chinese Taipei) Chan Chin-wei	(Ukraine) Tetiana Luzhanska (China) Zheng Saisai	4–6, 7–5, [4–10]
Loss	5–14	Feb 2012	ITF Sydney, Australia (2)	25,000	Hard	(China) Duan Yingying	(Australia) Arina Rodionova (United Kingdom) Melanie South	6–3, 3–6, [8–10]
Loss	5–15	Mar 2012	ITF Phuket, Thailand	25,000	Hard	(China) Sun Shengnan	(Thailand) Noppawan Lertcheewakarn (China) Zheng Saisai	3–6, 3–6
Win	6–15	May 2012	Kurume Cup, Japan	50,000	Grass	(China) Sun Shengnan	(Russia) Ksenia Lykina (United Kingdom) Melanie South	6–1, 6–0
Loss	6–16	Jul 2012	Beijing Challenger, China	75,000	Hard	(Chinese Taipei) Chan Chin-wei	(China) Liu Wanting (China) Sun Shengnan	7–5, 0–6, [7–10]
Win	7–16	May 2013	ITF Seoul, South Korea	15,000	Hard	(China) Ye Qiuyu	(Chinese Taipei) Chan Chin-wei (China) Zhang Nannan	7–6^{(3)}, 4–6, [10–4]
Win	8–16	Feb 2014	ITF Nonthaburi, Thailand	10,000	Hard	(China) Zhang Kailin	(United Kingdom) Katie Boulter (China) Xun Fangying	6–3, 6–0
Win	9–16	Mar 2014	ITF Shenzhen, China	10,000	Hard	(China) Zhang Kailin	(Chinese Taipei) Chan Chin-wei (China) Liu Chang	6–3, 2–6, [13–11]
Win	10–16	Mar 2014	ITF Shenzhen, China (2)	10,000	Hard	(China) Zhang Kailin	(China) Gai Ao (China) Wang Yan	6–0, 6–3
Win	11–16	Apr 2014	ITF Nanning, China	25,000	Hard	(China) Zhang Kailin	(Hong Kong) Zhang Ling (China) Zheng Saisai	7–6^{(8)}, 7–6^{(3)}
Win	12–16	Apr 2014	Anning Open, China	50,000	Clay	(China) Zhang Kailin	(Thailand) Varatchaya Wongteanchai (Hong Kong) Zhang Ling	6–4, 6–2
Loss	12–17	May 2014	Zhengzhou Open, China	25,000	Hard	(China) Zhang Kailin	(Chinese Taipei) Chan Chin-wei (China) Liang Chen	3–6, 3–6
Win	13–17	Jul 2014	ITF Wuhan, China	50,000	Hard	(China) Zhang Kailin	(Japan) Miyu Kato (Japan) Makoto Ninomiya	6–4, 6–2
Win	14–17	Aug 2014	ITF Tsukuba, Japan	25,000	Hard	(China) Zhang Kailin	(Thailand) Nicha Lertpitaksinchai (Thailand) Peangtarn Plipuech	6–4, 6–4
Win	15–17	Jan 2015	ITF Hong Kong, China	50,000	Hard	(Chinese Taipei) Hsu Chieh-yu	(Thailand) Varatchaya Wongteanchai (Thailand) Varunya Wongteanchai	3–6, 6–4, [10–8]
Loss	15–18	Feb 2015	Burnie International, Australia	50,000	Hard	(Japan) Junri Namigata	(United States) Irina Falconi (Croatia) Petra Martić	2–6, 4–6
Win	16–18	Feb 2015	Launceston International, Australia	50,000	Hard	(Japan) Junri Namigata	(China) Wang Yafan (China) Yang Zhaoxuan	6–4, 3–6, [10–6]
Win	17–18	May 2015	ITF Wuhan, China (2)	50,000	Hard	(Chinese Taipei) Chang Kai-chen	(China) Liu Chang (China) Lu Jiajing	6–0, 6–3
Win	18–18	May 2015	ITF Xuzhou, China	50,000	Hard	(Chinese Taipei) Chang Kai-Chen	(China) Cao Siqi (China) Zhou Mingjun	6–3, 6–2
Win	19–18	Jul 2015	ITF Bangkok, Thailand	25,000	Hard	(China) Zhang Kailin	(Japan) Kanae Hisami (Japan) Kotomi Takahata	6–3, 6–4
Loss	19–19	Nov 2016	Shenzhen Longhua Open, China (3)	100,000	Hard	(China) Zhu Lin	(Serbia) Nina Stojanović (China) You Xiaodi	4–6, 6–7^{(6)}
Win	20–19	Mar 2017	Blossom Cup, China (2)	60,000	Hard	(China) Ye Qiuyu	(Japan) Hiroko Kuwata (China) Zhu Lin	6–3, 6–3
Win	21–19	Apr 2017	Kunming Open, China (2)	100,000	Clay	(China) Ye Qiuyu	(India) Prarthana Thombare (China) Xun Fangying	6–2, 7–5
Win	22–19	May 2017	Open Saint-Gaudens, France	60,000	Clay	(Chinese Taipei) Chang Kai-chen	(Paraguay) Montserrat González (Spain) Sílvia Soler Espinosa	7–5, 6–1
Win	23–19	Oct 2017	Liuzhou Open, China	60,000	Hard	(Japan) Makoto Ninomiya	(United States) Jacqueline Cako (United Kingdom) Laura Robson	6–2, 7–6^{(3)}
Win	24–19	Mar 2018	ITF Nanjing, China	15,000	Hard	(China) Ye Qiuyu	(China) Sun Xuliu (China) Zhao Qianqian	3–6, 6–3, [10–5]
Win	25–19	Apr 2018	Blossom Cup, China (3)	60,000	Hard	(China) Ye Qiuyu	(China) Guo Hanyu (China) Wang Xinyu	7–6^{(3)}, 7–6^{(6)}
Win	26–19	May 2019	Kangaroo Cup, Japan	80,000	Hard	(China) Duan Yingying	(Japan) Akiko Omae (Thailand) Peangtarn Plipuech	6–3, 4–6, [10–4]

== See also ==
- Tennis in China
