= Lu Jingjing =

Chinese tennis player

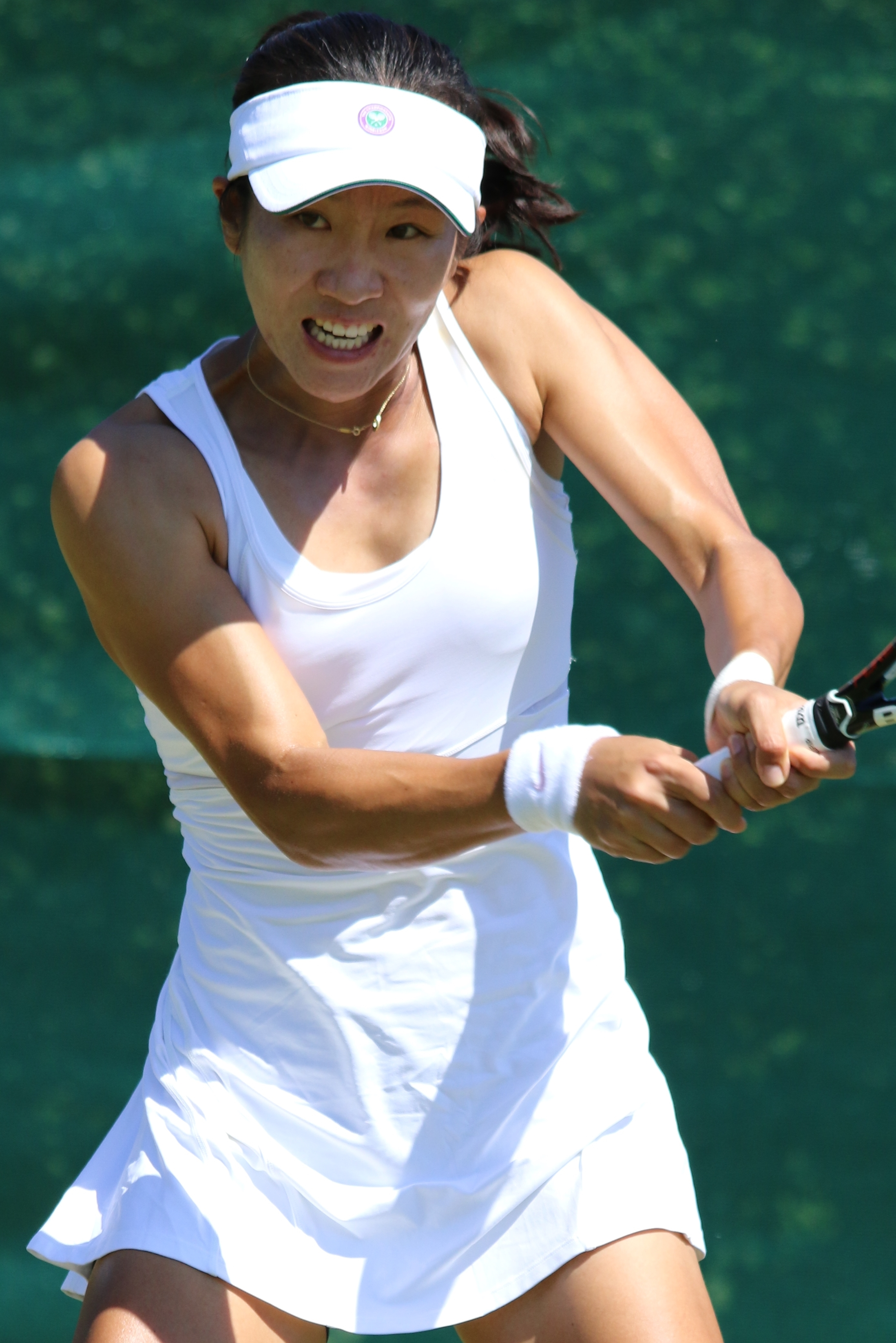
- Lu at the 2018 Wimbledon Championships
- Country (sports): China
- Residence: Shandong, China
- Born: 5 May 1989 (age 37) Inner Mongolia, China
- Height: 1.70 m (5 ft 7 in)
- Plays: Right (two-handed backhand)
- Prize money: US$ 405,015

Singles
- Career record: 313–251
- Career titles: 0 WTA, 4 ITF
- Highest ranking: No. 159 (15 January 2018)
- Current ranking: No. 758 (17 March 2025)

Grand Slam singles results
- Australian Open: Q1 (2012)
- French Open: Q1 (2011)
- Wimbledon: Q1 (2011)
- US Open: Q3 (2011)

Doubles
- Career record: 234–179
- Career titles: 1 WTA, 1 WTA 125
- Highest ranking: No. 105 (21 September 2009)
- Current ranking: No. 553 (17 March 2025)

Team competitions
- Fed Cup: 3–4
- Last updated on: 28 March 2025.

Lu Jingjing (Chinese: 鲁晶晶; pinyin: Lú Jīngjīng; Mandarin pronunciation: [lù tɕíŋ tɕíŋ]; born 5 May 1989) is a Chinese tennis player. On 15 January 2018, she reached her best singles ranking of No. 159 by the WTA. On 21 September 2009, she peaked at No. 105 in the WTA doubles rankings.

Jingjing has won one doubles title on the WTA Tour, and one doubles title on the WTA Challenger Tour, with four singles and 14 doubles titles on the ITF Tour.

== WTA Tour finals ==
=== Doubles: 3 (1 title, 2 runner-ups) ===
Legend Elite Trophy (0–1) WTA 1000 WTA 500 International / WTA 250 (1–1)	Finals by surface Hard (1–2) Clay (0–0) Grass (0–0) Carpet (0–0)

Result	W–L	Date	Tournament	Tier	Surface	Partner	Opponents	Score
Win	1–0	Aug 2016	Jiangxi International, China	International	Hard	(China) Liang Chen	(Japan) Shuko Aoyama (Japan) Makoto Ninomiya	3–6, 7–6^{(7–2)}, [13–11]
Loss	1–1	Nov 2017	WTA Elite Trophy, Zhuhai	Elite	Hard (i)	(China) Zhang Shuai	(China) Duan Yingying (China) Han Xinyun	2–6, 1–6
Loss	1–2	Jul 2018	Jiangxi International, China	International	Hard	(China) You Xiaodi	(China) Jiang Xinyu (China) Tang Qianhui	4–6, 4–6

== WTA Challenger finals ==
=== Doubles: 1 (title) ===
Result	Date	Tournament	Surface	Partner	Opponents	Score
Win	Sep 2017	Dalian Open, China	Clay	(China) You Xiaodi	(China) Guo Hanyu (China) Ye Qiuyu	7–6^{(7–2)}, 4–6, [10–5]

== ITF Circuit finals ==
Legend
W50/60 tournaments
W25/35 tournaments
W10/15 tournaments

=== Singles: 11 (4 titles, 7 runner-ups) ===
Result	W–L	Date	Tournament	Tier	Surface	Opponent	Score
Loss	0–1	Jul 2006	ITF Cheng Du, China	W25	Hard	(United Kingdom) Melanie South	5–7, 6–7^{(5–7)}
Loss	0–2	May 2008	ITF Gimcheon, South Korea	W25	Hard	(Australia) Jarmila Gajdošová	3–6, 2–6
Loss	0–3	Jun 2008	Open de Montpellier, France	W10	Clay	(Argentina) Veronica Spiegel	6–7^{(5–7)}, 4–6
Win	1–3	Nov 2008	ITF Pune, India	W25	Hard	(United Kingdom) Melanie South	6–3, 6–1
Loss	1–4	Feb 2009	Burnie International, Australia	W25	Hard	(United States) Abigail Spears	4–6, 2–6
Win	2–4	Jan 2011	Blossom Cup, China	W50	Hard	(France) Stéphanie Foretz	3–6, 7–6^{(7–2)}, 6–3
Win	3–4	Jan 2011	ITF Pingguo, China	W25	Hard	(United States) Tetiana Luzhanska	6–4, 7–5
Loss	3–5	May 2016	Zhengzhou Open, China	W50	Hard	(Russia) Anastasia Pivovarova	4–6, 4–6
Win	4–5	Jul 2017	ITF Naiman, China	W25	Hard	(India) Karman Kaur Thandi	6–2, 6–1
Loss	4–6	Jul 2018	ITF Tianjin, China	W25	Hard	(China) Liu Fangzhou	6–3, 3–6, 3–6
Loss	4–7	Apr 2025	ITF Wuning, China	W15	Hard	(China) Ren Yufei	2–6, 4–6

=== Doubles: 33 (14 titles, 19 runner-ups) ===
Result	W–L	Date	Tournament	Tier	Surface	Partner	Opponents	Score
Loss	0–1	Jun 2006	ITF New Delhi, India	10,000	Hard	(Singapore) Lee Wei-ping	(India) Sanaa Bhambri (India) Archana Venkataraman	3–6, 6–7^{(4–7)}
Win	1–1	Oct 2007	ITF Hamamatsu, Japan	25,000	Carpet	(China) Liu Wanting	(South Korea) Chae Kyung-yee (Japan) Mitsuko Ise	6–1, 6–2
Win	2–1	Jun 2008	Open de Montpellier, France	10,000	Clay	(Argentina) Veronica Spiegel	(France) Shérazad Benamar (France) Charlotte Rodier	7–5, 6–7^{(5–7)}, [10–7]
Loss	2–2	Nov 2008	ITF Kolkata, India	50,000	Hard	(China) Sun Shengnan	(Germany) Laura Siegemund (Romania) Ágnes Szatmári	5–7, 3–6
Win	3–2	Feb 2009	ITF Mildura, Australia	25,000	Grass	(China) Sun Shengnan	(China) Han Xinyun (China) Ji Chunmei	7–6^{(7–2)}, 7–6^{(7–4)}
Win	4–2	Mar 2009	ITF Lyon, France	10,000	Hard	(China) Sun Shengnan	(Turkey) Pemra Özgen (China) Zhang Shuai	6–4, 7–5
Win	5–2	Mar 2009	ITF Las Palmas, Spain	10,000	Hard	(China) Sun Shengnan	(Russia) Yana Buchina (Slovenia) Taja Mohorčič	6–3, 7–6^{(7–1)}
Win	6–2	Mar 2009	ITF La Palma, Spain	25,000	Hard	(China) Sun Shengnan	(Greece) Eleni Daniilidou (Germany) Jasmin Wöhr	6–2, 5–7, [10–5]
Win	7–2	May 2009	Kurume Cup, Japan	50,000	Grass	(China) Sun Shengnan	(Chinese Taipei) Chang Kai-chen (Japan) Ayaka Maekawa	6–3, 6–2
Win	8–2	May 2009	ITF Incheon, South Korea	25,000	Hard	(China) Sun Shengnan	(China) Han Xinyun (China) Ji Chunmei	6–3, 6–3
Loss	8–3	May 2009	ITF Goyang, South Korea	25,000	Hard	(China) Sun Shengnan	(Indonesia) Yayuk Basuki (Indonesia) Romana Tedjakusuma	7–6^{(7–5)}, 3–6, [8–10]
Win	9–3	Jul 2009	ITF Xiamen, China	25,000	Hard	(China) Sun Shengnan	(China) Han Xinyun (Chinese Taipei) Kao Shao-yuan	6–2, 6–4
Loss	9–4	Aug 2009	ITF Pingguo, China	25,000	Hard	(China) Sun Shengnan	(Chinese Taipei) Chan Chin-wei (Chinese Taipei) Hwang I-hsuan	6–3, 5–7, [7–10]
Loss	9–5	May 2010	ITF Florence, Italy	25,000	Clay	(Belarus) Polina Pekhova	(Estonia) Maret Ani (Germany) Julia Schruff	3–6, 4–6
Win	10–5	May 2010	Grado Tennis Cup, Italy	25,000	Clay	(China) Han Xinyun	(Russia) Karina Pimkina (Russia) Marta Sirotkina	1–6, 6–4, [10–8]
Win	11–5	Jun 2010	Open de Montpellier, France	25,000	Clay	(Germany) Laura Siegemund	(France) Amandine Hesse (Ukraine) Lyudmyla Kichenok	6–4, 6–2
Loss	11–6	Jun 2010	ITF Getxo, Spain	25,000	Clay	(Germany) Laura Siegemund	(Austria) Sandra Klemenschits (Slovenia) Andreja Klepač	0–6, 0–6
Loss	11–7	Aug 2010	ITF Tallinn, Estonia	25,000	Hard	(China) Sun Shengnan	(Finland) Emma Laine (United Kingdom) Melanie South	3–6, 4–6
Loss	11–8	Aug 2011	Bronx Open, United States	50,000	Hard	(China) Han Xinyun	(United States) Megan Moulton-Levy (United States) Ahsha Rolle	3–6, 6–7
Win	12–8	Jul 2015	ITF Tianjin, China	25,000	Clay	(China) Liu Wanting	(China) Chen Jiahui (China) You Xiaodi	6–7^{(4–7)}, 7–6^{(7–4)}, [10–4]
Loss	12–9	Mar 2016	Blossom Cup, China	50,000	Hard	(China) Zhang Yuxuan	(Japan) Shuko Aoyama (Japan) Makoto Ninomiya	3–6, 0–6
Loss	12–10	May 2016	ITF Tianjin, China	50,000	Hard	(China) Liu Wanting	(China) Li Yihong (China) Wang Yan	6–1, 0–6, [4–10]
Win	13–10	Apr 2017	ITF Nanning, China	25,000	Hard	(Russia) Valeria Savinykh	(China) Gai Ao (China) Guo Hanyu	6–4, 6–4
Loss	13–11	Jul 2017	ITF Naiman, China	25,000	Hard	(China) You Xiaodi	(China) Gao Xinyu (China) Xun Fangying	7–6^{(7–5)}, 4–6, [8–10]
Win	14–11	Jun 2018	ITF Luzhou, China	25,000	Hard	(China) Han Xinyun	(Australia) Alison Bai (Romania) Andreea Roșca	6–3, 6–3
Loss	14–12	Aug 2018	Jinan Open, China	60,000	Hard	(Chinese Taipei) Hsieh Yu-chieh	(China) Wang Xinyu (China) You Xiaodi	3–6, 7–6, [2–10]
Loss	14–13	Mar 2022	ITF Monastir, Tunisia	W15	Hard	(China) Wang Meiling	(Lithuania) Andrė Lukošiūtė (United Kingdom) Eliz Maloney	w/o
Loss	14–14	Jul 2024	ITF Naiman, China	W35	Hard	(China) Ye Qiuyu	(China) Guo Meiqi (China) Huang Yujia	3–6, 6–3, [11–13]
Loss	14–15	Aug 2024	ITF Xiamen, China	W15	Hard	(China) Xun Fangying	(China) Huang Yujia (China) Zhang Ying	2–6, 5–7
Loss	14–16	Mar 2025	ITF Ma'anshan, China	W15	Hard	(China) Xun Fangying	(South Korea) Kim Na-ri (China) Ye Qiuyu	4–6, 1–6
Loss	14–17	Oct 2026	ITF Ma'anshan, China	W15	Hard	(China) Wang Yuhan	Daria Egorova; Alina Yuneva	7–6^{(7–3)}, 6–7^{(6–8)}, [5–10]
Lost	14–18	Oct 2026	ITF Singapore	W15	Hard	(Chinese Taipei) Lin Fang-an	(Thailand) Anchisa Chanta (Thailand) Thasaporn Naklo	1–6, 3–6
Loss	14–19	Oct 2026	ITF Singapore	W15	Hard	(Japan) Nagi Hanatani	(South Korea) Kim Yu-jin (Chinese Taipei) Lin Fang-an	1–6, 1–6

== Ranking history ==
Year	2006	2007	2008	2009	2010	2011	2012	2013	2014	2015	2016	2017	2018	2019	2020	2021	2022	2023
Year-end ranking	420	335	247	201	246	214	703	816	–	262	261	169	280	623	701	–	666	913
