= Liu Wanting =

Chinese tennis player

Liu Wanting 刘婉婷
- Country (sports): China
- Residence: Beijing, China
- Born: 16 February 1989 (age 37) Beijing
- Height: 1.68 m (5 ft 6 in)
- Turned pro: 2006
- Plays: Right (two-handed backhand)
- Prize money: $92,531

Singles
- Career record: 86–106
- Highest ranking: No. 310 (30 July 2007)

Doubles
- Career record: 171–125
- Career titles: 14 ITF
- Highest ranking: No. 110 (8 October 2012)

Liu Wanting (Chinese: 刘婉婷; pinyin: Liú Wǎntíng; Mandarin pronunciation: [ljǒʊ wàn tʰǐŋ]; born February 16, 1989) is a Chinese former professional tennis player.

Wanting won 14 doubles titles on the ITF Women's Circuit. On 30 July 2007, she reached her best singles ranking of world No. 310. On 8 October 2012, she peaked at No. 110 in the WTA doubles rankings.

Her best result is reaching the doubles final of the 2010 Guangzhou International Open, the only WTA Tour final in her career.

In 2012, she competed one time for the China Fed Cup team, but she lost her match.

== WTA Tour finals ==
=== Doubles: 1 (runner-up) ===
Result	Date	Tournament	Tier	Surface	Partner	Opponents	Score
Loss	Sep 2010	Guangzhou Open, China	International	Hard	(China) Han Xinyun	(Romania) Edina Gallovits (India) Sania Mirza	5–7, 3–6

== ITF Circuit finals ==
Legend
$75,000 tournaments
$50,000 tournaments
$25,000 tournaments
$15,000 tournaments
$10,000 tournaments

=== Singles: 1 (runner-up) ===
Result	Date	Tournament	Surface	Opponent	Score	
Loss	0–1	29 March 2010	ITF Nanjing, China	Hard	(China) Duan Yingying	4–6, 6–7^{(6)}

=== Doubles: 25 (14 titles, 11 runner-ups) ===
Outcome	W–L	Date	Tournament	Surface	Partner	Opponents	Score
Runner-up	0–1	May 2005	ITF Shanghai, China	Hard	(China) Sun Shengnan	(Chinese Taipei) Chuang Chia-Jung (Japan) Remi Tezuka	6–4, 4–6, 1–6
Winner	1–1	Feb 2006	ITF Melilla, Spain	Hard	(China) Sun Shengnan	(Spain) Sara del Barrio Aragón (Spain) Sabrina Méndez Domínguez	6–4, 6–0
Runner-up	3.	Jun 2006	ITF Changwon, South Korea	Hard	(China) Chen Yanchong	(South Korea) Chang Kyung-mi (South Korea) Kim Mi-ok	5–7, 1–6
Winner	4.	Aug 2006	Changsha, China	Hard	(China) Chen Yanchong	(China) Xia Huan (China) Xu Yifan	6–3, 6–3
Winner	5.	Mar 2007	Hyderabad, İndia	Hard	(Chinese Taipei) Chen Yi	(South Korea) Jeong A-cho (South Korea) Kim Ji-young	6–4, 6–1
Runner-up	6.	May 2007	Chengdu, China	Hard	(China) Chen Yanchong	(Japan) Natsumi Hamamura (China) Song Shanshan	5–7, 6–4, 2–6
Runner-up	7.	Jul 2007	Kurume Cup, Japan	Grass	(China) Song Shanshan	(Japan) Ayumi Oka (Japan) Tomoko Sugano	4–6, 1–6
Winner	8.	Oct 2007	Hamamatsu, Japan	Carpet	(China) Lu Jingjing	(South Korea) Chae Kyung-yee (Japan) Mitsuko Ise	6–1, 6–2
Runner Up	9.	Jun 2008	ITF Tokyo, Japan	Hard	(China) Zhao Yijing	(Japan) Maya Kato (Japan) Miki Miyamura	4–6, 2–6
Winner	10.	Jan 2010	Quanzhou, China	Hard	(China) Zhou Yimiao	(Ukraine) Yuliya Beygelzimer (China) Yan Zi	6–1, 6–2
Runner-up	11.	Jan 2010	Pingguo, China	Hard	(China) Ji Chunmei	(China) Xu Yifan (Chinese Taipei) Chan Chin-wei	3–6, 1–6
Winner	12.	Mar 2010	Ningbo, China	Hard	(China) Zhao Yijing	(China) Lu Jiaxing (China) Li Xi	6–0, 6–4
Runner-up	13.	May 2010	Tarakan, Indonesia	Hard	(Japan) Mari Tanaka	(Indonesia) Ayu-Fani Damayanti (Indonesia) Lavinia Tananta	4–6, 5–7
Winner	14.	May 2010	Tanjung Selor, Indonesia	Hard	(Hong Kong) Zhang Ling	(Indonesia) Jessy Rompies (Thailand) Noppawan Lertcheewakarn	7–6^{(5)}, 6–3
Runner-up	15.	Aug 2010	Beijing Challenger, China	Hard	(China) Ji Chunmei	(China) Sun Shengnan (China) Zhang Shuai	6–4, 2–6, [5–10]
Winner	16.	Jan 2011	ITF Quanzhou, China	Hard	(China) Sun Shengnan	(Ukraine) Yuliya Beygelzimer (Georgia (country)) Oksana Kalashnikova	6–3, 6–2
Runner-up	17.	Jan 2011	ITF Pingguo, China	Hard	(China) Sun Shengnan	(Japan) Shuko Aoyama (Japan) Rika Fujiwara	4–6, 3–6
Runner-up	18.	May 2011	Grado Tennis Cup, Italy	Clay	(China) Sun Shengnan	(Argentina) María Irigoyen (Russia) Ekaterina Lopes	3–6, 0–6
Winner	19.	Aug 2011	Saitama, Japan	Hard	(China) Liang Chen	(Japan) Akari Inoue (Japan) Ayumi Oka	6–3, 5–7, 6–2
Runner-up	20.	Apr 2012	Wenshan, China	Hard	(China) Xu Yifan	(Chinese Taipei) Hsieh Shu-ying (Chinese Taipei) Hsieh Su-wei	3–6, 2–6
Winner	21.	May 2012	Changwon, South Korea	Hard	(China) Xu Yifan	(China) Yang Zhaoxuan (China) Zhang Kailin	6–4, 7–5
Winner	22.	Jun 2012	Goyang, Korea	Hard	(China) Sun Shengnan	(Thailand) Nicha Lertpitaksinchai (Thailand) Peangtarn Plipuech	6–7^{(1)}, 6–3, [10–7]
Winner	23.	Jul 2012	Beijing Challenger, China	Hard	(China) Sun Shengnan	(Chinese Taipei) Chan Chin-wei (China) Han Xinyun	5–7, 6–0, [10–7]
Winner	24.	Apr 2013	ITF Seoul, South Korea	Hard	(China) Yang Zhaoxuan	(Chinese Taipei) Chan Chin-wei (China) Zhang Nannan	6–2, 6–2
Winner	14–11	Jul 2015	ITF Tianjin, China	Clay	(China) Lu Jingjing	(China) Chen Jiahui (China) You Xiaodi	6–7^{(4)}, 7–6^{(4)}, [10–4]
