= 2016 Bredeney Ladies Open =

- Date: 6–12 June
- Edition: 4th
- Category: ITF Women's Circuit
- Prize money: $50,000
- Surface: Clay
- Location: Essen, Germany

Champions

Singles
- (Spain) Sara Sorribes Tormo

Doubles
- (Spain) Laura Pous Tió / (Germany) Anne Schäfer
← 2015 ·	Bredeney Ladies Open	· 2017 →

The 2016 Bredeney Ladies Open was a professional tennis tournament played on outdoor clay courts. It was the fourth edition of the tournament and part of the 2016 ITF Women's Circuit, offering a total of $50,000 in prize money. It took place in Essen, Germany, on 6–12 June 2016.

== Singles main draw entrants ==
=== Seeds ===
Country	Player	Rank^{1}	Seed
BLR	Aliaksandra Sasnovich	98	1
GER	Carina Witthöft	100	2
ESP	Lourdes Domínguez Lino	112	3
GRE	Maria Sakkari	114	4
SVK	Jana Čepelová	132	5
SUI	Romina Oprandi	137	6
~~BUL~~	~~Sesil Karatantcheva~~	~~163~~	~~7~~
NED	Cindy Burger	173	8

- ^{1} Rankings as of 23 May 2016.

=== Other entrants ===
The following player received a wildcard into the singles main draw:

- (Germany) Julia Kimmelmann
- (Russia) Kristina Kislyak
- (Germany) Dana Kremer
- (Norway) Melanie Stokke

The following players received entry from the qualifying draw:

- (Uzbekistan) Akgul Amanmuradova
- (Austria) Pia König
- (Spain) Olga Sáez Larra
- (Germany) Anna Zaja

The following players received entry by lucky loser spots:

- (Denmark) Karen Barritza
- (Germany) Tayisiya Morderger
- (Germany) Yana Morderger

== Champions ==
=== Singles ===
- (Spain) Sara Sorribes Tormo def. (Czech Republic) Karolína Muchová, 7–6^{(7–5)}, 6–4

=== Doubles ===
- (Spain) Laura Pous Tió / (Germany) Anne Schäfer def. (Belgium) Elyne Boeykens / (Romania) Elena Ruse, 6–2, 6–3
