= 2016 ITF Women's Circuit =

Details
- Duration: 4 January 2016 – 1 January 2017
- Edition: 23rd
- Tournaments: 572
- Categories: $100,000 tournaments (14) $75,000 tournaments (5) $50,000 tournaments (49) $25,000 tournaments (131) $10,000 tournaments (373)

Achievements (singles)
- Most titles: (Germany) Katharina Hobgarski (8)
- Most finals: (Germany) Katharina Hobgarski (Bulgaria) Isabella Shinikova (8)

The 2016 International Tennis Federation (ITF) Women's Circuit is a second-tier tour for women's professional tennis. It is organized by the International Tennis Federation and is a tier below the Women's Tennis Association (WTA) Tour. The ITF Women's Circuit includes tournaments with prize money ranging from $10,000 to $100,000.

== Schedule ==
=== Key ===
Category
$100,000 tournaments
$75,000 tournaments
$50,000 tournaments
$25,000 tournaments
$10,000 tournaments

=== January–March ===
Tournaments

No.	January				February					March			
No.	4	11	18	25	1	8	15	22	29	7	14	21	28
1	HKG F1	IND F1	BRA F1	FRA F3	USA F5	AUS F2	AUS F3	SUI F1	AUS F5	BRA F5	AUS F6	CHN F4	FRA F10
2	TUR F1	USA F1	USA F2	USA F3	AUS F1	EGY F5	GER F2	AUS F4	BRA F4	MEX F2	MEX F3	AUS F7	USA F11
3		EGY F1	EGY F2	BRA F2	FRA F5	SVK F1	IND F2	BRA F3	CHN F1	CHN F2	CHN F3	USA F10	JPN F2
4		FRA F1	FRA F2	USA F4	EGY F4	TUN F5	MEX F1	ITA F1	EGY F8	EGY F9	EGY F10	BRA F6	BHR F1
5		GER F1	KAZ F1	EGY F3	TUN F4	TUR F6	USA F6	RUS F1	FRA F6	FRA F7	FRA F8	EGY F11	BRA F7
6		TUN F1	TUN F2	FRA F4	TUR F5	GBR F2	EGY F6	USA F7	ESP F3	TUN F9	TUN F10	FRA F9	EGY F12
7		TUR F2	TUR F3	TUN F3	GBR F1		ESP F1	EGY F7	TUN F8	TUR F10	TUR F11	GRE F1	GRE F2
8				TUR F4			TUN F6	ESP F2	TUR F9	USA F8	USA F9	JPN F1	MEX F4
9							TUR F7	TUN F7				TUN F11	TUN F12
10							GBR F3	TUR F8				TUR F12	TUR F13

=== April–June ===
Tournaments

No.	April				May					June			
No.	4	11	18	25	2	9	16	23	30	6	13	20	27
1	JPN F3	CHN F5	USA F14	USA F15	CHN F7	SVK F2	CHN F8	CHN F9	FRA F14	GER F4	HUN F5	FRA F17	ITA F13
2	KOR F1	TUR F15	CHN F6	GER F3	FRA F12	FRA F13	JPN F6	ITA F8	ITA F9	GBR F5	GBR F6	ITA F12	FRA F18
3	USA F12	USA F13	BRA F10	SUI F2	JPN F4	JPN F5	ITA F7	JPN F7	GBR F4	BLR F1	BLR F2	RUS F3	GER F6
4	UZB F1	BRA F9	EGY F15	ARG F1	USA F16	HUN F3	KOR F2	KOR F3	HUN F4	ITA F10	FRA F16	SWE F3	NED F3
5	BRA F8	EGY F14	GRE F5	CRO F1	TUN F17	TUN F18	CRO F4	UZB F2	UZB F3	JPN F8	GER F5	SUI F3	POL F4
6	EGY F13	FRA F11	ITA F3	EGY F16	ARG F2	USA F17	EGY F19	AZE F1	AZE F2	ARG F3	USA F20	USA F21	SWE F4
7	GRE F3	GRE F4	KAZ F2	GRE F6	CRO F2	CRO F3	ISR F1	EGY F20	EGY F21	AZE F3	UZB F4	BEL F1	USA F22
8	TUN F13	ITA F2	TUN F15	HUN F1	EGY F17	EGY F18	ROU F1	ISR F2	ISR F3	CHN F10	CAN F1	CHN F12	BIH F1
9	TUR F14	TUN F14	TUR F17	ITA F4	HUN F2	ITA F6	SWE F2	POL F1	POL F2	EGY F22	CHN F11	EGY F24	EGY F25
10		TUR F16		KAZ F3	ITA F5	ESP F4	TUN F19	ROU F2	ROU F3	FRA F15	CZE F1	GER F5	POR F3
11				TUN F16	RUS F2	SWE F1	TUR F21	ESP F5	ESP F6	ISR F4	EGY F23	MRI F2	ROU F4
12				TUR F18	TUR F19	TUR F20		TUN F20	TUN F21	POL F3	ITA F11	NED F2	RUS F4
13								TUR F22	TUR F23	SLO F1	MRI F1	POR F2	KOR F5
14									USA F18	ESP F7	NED F1	SLO F3	TUR F27
15										TUR F24	POR F1	KOR F4	
16										USA F19	SLO F2	TPE F2	
17											TPE F1	TUR F26	
18											TUR F25		

=== July–September ===
Tournaments

No.	July				August					September			
No.	4	11	18	25	1	8	15	22	29	5	12	19	26
1	FRA F19	CZE F2	USA F24	CZE F3	CAN F3	BEL F6	BEL F7	HUN F7	CHN F17	HUN F8	FRA F21	RUS F7	USA F32
2	HUN F6	TUR F29	GER F9	CHN F15	CZE F4	CAN F4	GER F13	ITA F20	JPN F10	BUL F1	CHN F18	USA F32	AUS F9
3	GER F7	USA F23	AUT F1	USA F26	GER F11	CHN F16	AUT F3	JPN F9	KAZ F6	GEO F2	USA F30	FRA F22	FRA F23
4	CHN F13	CAN F2	EGY F28	BRA F8	THA F1	GER F12	COL F1	UKR F2	ROU F12	BEL F9	BUL F2	AUS F8	JPN F11
5	ITA F14	CHN F14	FIN F1	GER F10	USA F28	USA F29	EGY F32	AUT F4	ESP F14	CZE F6	HUN F9	MNE F1	THA F3
6	BEL F2	GER F8	FRA F20	KAZ F5	AUT F2	EGY F31	ITA F19	BEL F8	AUT F5	EGY F35	UKR F4	THA F2	USA F33
7	EGY F26	ITA F15	HKG F3	BEL F4	BEL F5	ITA F18	NED F5	COL F2	CZE F5	JPN F11	USA F31	CZE F8	BUL F3
8	NED F4	BEL F3	ITA F16	EGY F29	CRO F5	ROU F9	ROU F10	CRO F6	EGY F34	NED F8	CZE F7	EGY F37	EGY F38
9	POR F4	EGY F27	KAZ F4	EST F1	EGY F30	RUS F5	RUS F6	EGY F33	GEO F1	POR F5	EGY F36	ISR F6	ISR F7
10	ROU F5	HKG F2	ROU F6	FIN F2	ITA F17	ESP F12	SVK F3	GER F14	ITA F21	KOR F9	ISR F5	ITA F23	ITA F24
11	SRB F1	SRB F2	SRB F3	ROU F7	ROU F8		ESP F13	NED F6	NED F7	TUN F22	ITA F22	KAZ F7	KAZ F8
12	KOR F6	KOR F7	ESP F9	SRB F4	ESP F11		UKR F1	ROU F11	SRB F5	UKR F3	LUX F1	ESP F16	MDA F1
13	ESP F8		USA F25	ESP F10				SUI F4	KOR F8		POR F6	TUN F24	ESP F17
14	TUR F28			USA F27					SUI F5		ESP F15	GBR F7	TUN F25
15											TUN F23		GBR F8
16													USA F34

=== October–December ===
Tournaments

No.	October					November				December			
No.	3	10	17	24	31	7	14	21	28	5	12	19	26
1	AUS F9	AUS F10	EGY F41	FRA F26	AUS F12	JPN F14	CHN F22	ESP F21	CHI F2	BOL F1	UAE F1	TUR F39	HKG F4
2	ITA F25	FRA F24	CAN F5	AUS F11	CAN F6	USA F40	JPN F15	USA F41	EGY F47	DJI F1	IND F6	IND F7	MAR F6
3	USA F35	ITA F26	CHN F19	CHN F20	USA F39	BLR F3	POL F5	CHI F1	ISR F9	EGY F48	BOL F2	MAR F5	
4	BUL F4	JPN F12	FRA F25	MEX F6	CHN F21	IND F4	EGY F45	EGY F46	ITA F33	IND F5	DJI F2		
5	CRO F7	NGR F1	JPN F13	USA F38	COL F4	SVK F4	FIN F3	GRE F11	ESP F22	ISR F10	EGY F49		
6	EGY F39	CRO F8	NGR F2	COL F3	EGY F43	EGY F44	GRE F10	ITA F32	THA F8	ITA F34	MAR F4		
7	INA F1	EGY F40	CRO F9	EGY F42	GBR F10	GBR F11	ITA F31	THA F7	TUN F34	ESP F23	TUN F36		
8	ISR F8	INA F2	GER F15	GBR F9	GRE F8	GRE F9	MAR F3	TUN F33	TUR F36	TUN F35	TUR F38		
9	KAZ F9	THA F5	ITA F27	GRE F7	ITA F29	ITA F30	RSA F36	TUR F35		TUR F37			
10	MEX F5	TUN F27	THA F6	IND F3	MAR F1	MAR F2	ESP F20						
11	MDA F2	TUR F29	TUN F28	ITA F28	NOR F1	RSA F2	TUN F32						
12	POR F7		TUR F30	SWE F5	RSA F1	ESP F19	TUR F34						
13	ESP F18			TUN F29	SWE F6	TUN F31							
14	THA F4			TUR F31	TUN F30	TUR F33							
15	TUN F26				TUR F32								
16	USA F36												

== Participating host nations ==
- Argentina (ARG)
- Australia (AUS)
- Austria (AUT)
- Azerbaijan (AZE)
- Bahrain (BHR)
- Belarus (BLR)
- Belgium (BEL)
- Bolivia (BOL)
- Bosnia and Herzegovina (BIH)
- Brazil (BRA)
- Bulgaria (BUL)
- Canada (CAN)
- Chile (CHI)
- China (CHN)
- Chinese Taipei (TPE)
- Colombia (COL)
- Croatia (CRO)
- Czech Republic (CZE)
- Djibouti (DJI)
- Egypt (EGY)
- Estonia (EST)
- Finland (FIN)
- France (FRA)
- Georgia (GEO)
- Germany (GER)
- Great Britain (GBR)
- Greece (GRE)
- Hong Kong (HKG)
- Hungary (HUN)
- India (IND)
- Indonesia (INA)
- Israel (ISR)
- Italy (ITA)
- Japan (JPN)
- Kazakhstan (KAZ)
- Luxembourg (LUX)
- Mauritius (MRI)
- Mexico (MEX)
- Moldova (MDA)
- Montenegro (MNE)
- Morocco (MAR)
- Netherlands (NED)
- Nigeria (NGR)
- Norway (NOR)
- Poland (POL)
- Portugal (POR)
- Romania (ROU)
- Russia (RUS)
- Serbia (SRB)
- Slovakia (SVK)
- Slovenia (SLO)
- South Africa (RSA)
- South Korea (KOR)
- Spain (ESP)
- Sweden (SWE)
- Switzerland (SUI)
- Thailand (THA)
- Tunisia (TUN)
- Turkey (TUR)
- Ukraine (UKR)
- United Arab Emirates (UAE)
- United States (USA)
- Uzbekistan (UZB)

== Tournament breakdown by event category ==
Event category	Number of events	Total prize money
$100,000	14	$1,400,000
$75,000	5	$375,000
$50,000	49	$2,450,000
$25,000	131	$3,275,000
$10,000	373	$3,730,000
Total	572	$11,230,000

== Ranking points distribution ==
Category	W	F	SF	QF	R16	R32	Q	Q3	Q2	Q1
ITF $100,000+H (S)	150	90	55	28	14	1	6	4	1	–
ITF $100,000+H (D)	150	90	55	28	1	–	–	–	–	–
ITF $100,000 (S)	140	85	50	25	13	1	6	4	1	–
ITF $100,000 (D)	140	85	50	25	1	–	–	–	–	–
ITF $75,000+H (S)	130	80	48	24	12	1	5	3	1	–
ITF $75,000+H (D)	130	80	48	24	1	–	–	–	–	–
ITF $75,000 (S)	115	70	42	21	10	1	5	3	1	–
ITF $75,000 (D)	115	70	42	21	1	–	–	–	–	–
ITF $50,000+H (S)	100	60	36	18	9	1	5	3	1	–
ITF $50,000+H (D)	100	60	36	18	1	–	–	–	–	–
ITF $50,000 (S)	80	48	29	15	8	1	5	3	1	–
ITF $50,000 (D)	80	48	29	15	1	–	–	–	–	–
ITF $25,000+H (S)	60	36	22	11	6	1	2	–	–	–
ITF $25,000+H (D)	60	36	22	11	1	–	–	–	–	–
ITF $25,000 (S)	50	30	18	9	5	1	1	–	–	–
ITF $25,000 (D)	50	30	18	9	1	–	–	–	–	–
ITF $10,000+H (S)	25	15	9	5	1	–	–	–	–	–
ITF $10,000+H (D)	25	15	9	1	0	–	–	–	–	–
ITF $10,000 (S)	12	7	4	2	1	–	–	–	–	–
ITF $10,000 (D)	12	7	4	1	0	–	–	–	–	–

- "+H" indicates that hospitality is provided.

== Retired players ==
Player	Born	Highest singles/doubles ranking	ITF titles in singles+doubles
(Russia) Ekaterina Afinogenova	15 January 1987	219/273	0+1
(Brazil) Maria Fernanda Alves	17 April 1983	132/109	23+57
(Spain) Eloisa Compostizo de Andrés	8 August 1988	199/605	3+0
(Italy) Gioia Barbieri	9 July 1991	170/165	8+15
(Philippines) Denise Dy	16 May 1989	1139/715	0+2
(Argentina) Soledad Esperón	8 February 1985	166/139	10+25
(Italy) Anna Floris	15 May 1982	129/213	12+16
(Greece) Anna Koumantou	3 December 1982	573/263	0+2
(Colombia) Viky Núñez Fuentes	14 October 1988	496/415	2+8
(Australia) Shannon Golds	3 October 1986	203/202	2+6
(Netherlands) Kim Kilsdonk	31 March 1979	347/144	1+30
(Serbia) Vojislava Lukić	31 March 1987	203/223	8+5
(United States) Natalie Pluskota	2 November 1989	478/157	0+4

== Statistics ==
=== Key ===
Category
$100,000 tournaments
$75,000 tournaments
$50,000 tournaments
$25,000 tournaments
$10,000 tournaments

=== Titles won by player ===
Updated as of 31 December

Total	Player	$100K		$75K		$50K		$25K		$10K		Total	
Total	Player	S	D	S	D	S	D	S	D	S	D	S	D
13	Chantal Škamlová (SVK)								2	4	7	4	9
12	Katharina Hobgarski (GER)								1	8	3	8	4
12	Petra Krejsová (CZE)									3	9	3	9
10	Julia Wachaczyk (GER)									4	6	4	6
10	Lina Gjorcheska (MKD)						2	1	4	2	1	3	7
10	Melis Sezer (TUR)									3	7	3	7
9	Isabella Shinikova (BUL)							4	1	3	1	7	2
9	Ayla Aksu (TUR)									6	3	6	3
9	Ágnes Bukta (HUN)									4	5	4	5
9	Fernanda Brito (CHI)									3	6	3	6
9	Anna Kalinskaya (RUS)		1					2	4		2	2	7
9	Chayenne Ewijk (NED)								1	2	6	2	7
9	Carolina Meligeni Alves (BRA)									2	7	2	7
9	Taylor Townsend (USA)					1	6		2			1	8
9	Ana Veselinović (MNE)								1	1	7	1	8
9	Vlada Ekshibarova (ISR)									1	8	1	8
8	Jaqueline Cristian (ROU)									5	3	5	3
8	Quirine Lemoine (NED)							3	3	1	1	4	4
8	Angelica Moratelli (ITA)									4	4	4	4
8	Chiara Scholl (USA)									4	4	4	4
8	Anastasiya Komardina (RUS)							2	4	1	1	3	5
8	Akiko Omae (JPN)						2	2	3		1	2	6
8	Veronika Kudermetova (RUS)						1	2	5			2	6
8	Valentini Grammatikopoulou (GRE)							1	5	1	1	2	6
8	Margarita Lazareva (RUS)								1	2	5	2	6
8	Yana Sizikova (RUS)								3		5	0	8
8	Rosalie van der Hoek (NED)								1		7	0	8
8	Tamara Čurović (SRB)										8	0	8
8	Camila Giangreco Campiz (PAR)										8	0	8
8	Giorgia Marchetti (ITA)										8	0	8
7	Irina Khromacheva (RUS)		1			2		3	1			5	2
7	Tamara Zidanšek (SLO)							4	2	1		5	2
7	Kamila Kerimbayeva (KAZ)									5	2	5	2
7	Tereza Mihalíková (SVK)		1							4	2	4	3
7	Georgina García Pérez (ESP)		1					1	3	2		3	4
7	Alexandra Perper (MDA)									3	4	3	4
7	Irina Maria Bara (ROU)		1					1	2	1	2	2	5
7	Olga Doroshina (RUS)								1	2	4	2	5
7	Laura-Ioana Andrei (ROU)									2	5	2	5
7	Natela Dzalamidze (RUS)						1		5	1		1	6
7	Laura Pigossi (BRA)								5	1	1	1	6
7	Sviatlana Pirazhenka (BLR)									1	6	1	6
7	Oana Georgeta Simion (ROU)									1	6	1	6
7	Asia Muhammad (USA)						5		2			0	7
7	Despina Papamichail (GRE)										7	0	7
6	Viktória Kužmová (SVK)							1	1	3	1	4	2
6	Elena Gabriela Ruse (ROU)									3	3	3	3
6	Sarah-Rebecca Sekulic (GER)									3	3	3	3
6	Zhang Kailin (CHN)	1	1				2	1	1			2	4
6	Ksenia Lykina (RUS)					1	2	1	2			2	4
6	Chanel Simmonds (RSA)								1	2	3	2	4
6	Nina Stojanović (SRB)		2			1			3			1	5
6	Ingrid Neel (USA)		1				2		1	1	1	1	5
6	Michaëlla Krajicek (NED)				1	1	4					1	5
6	Alyona Sotnikova (UKR)							1			5	1	5
6	Emina Bektas (USA)								2	1	3	1	5
6	Julia Grabher (AUT)									1	5	1	5
6	Déborah Kerfs (BEL)									1	5	1	5
6	Ilona Kremen (BLR)									1	5	1	5
6	Anastasiya Shoshyna (UKR)									1	5	1	5
6	Dhruthi Tatachar Venugopal (IND)									1	5	1	5
6	Cornelia Lister (SWE)								3		3	0	6
6	Dasha Ivanova (USA)										6	0	6
6	Barbara Kötelesová (SVK)										6	0	6
6	Daiana Negreanu (ROU)										6	0	6
6	Naomi Totka (HUN)										6	0	6
5	Viktoriya Tomova (BUL)					1				3	1	4	1
5	Kathinka von Deichmann (LIE)							1	1	3		4	1
5	Gabriela Pantůčková (CZE)									4	1	4	1
5	Maria Marfutina (RUS)		1							3	1	3	2
5	Anne Schäfer (GER)						1		1	3		3	2
5	Jil Teichmann (SUI)							2	1	1	1	3	2
5	Jessika Ponchet (FRA)									3	2	3	2
5	Arantxa Rus (NED)						1	2	2			2	3
5	Polina Monova (RUS)							1	3	1		2	3
5	Jacqueline Cabaj Awad (SWE)									2	3	2	3
5	Andrea Ka (CAM)									2	3	2	3
5	Shuko Aoyama (JPN)						3	1	1			1	4
5	Arina Rodionova (AUS)						2	1	2			1	4
5	Oleksandra Korashvili (UKR)								1	1	3	1	4
5	Ellen Perez (AUS)								1	1	3	1	4
5	Ana Bianca Mihăilă (ROU)									1	4	1	4
5	Ema Burgić Bucko (BIH)		1				1		1		2	0	5
5	Alona Fomina (UKR)		1								4	0	5
5	Aleksandrina Naydenova (BUL)						1		4			0	5
5	Manon Arcangioli (FRA)								1		4	0	5
5	Guadalupe Pérez Rojas (ARG)								1		4	0	5
5	Valeria Savinykh (RUS)								1		4	0	5
5	Emily Arbuthnott (GBR)										5	0	5
5	Sharmada Balu (IND)										5	0	5
5	Charlotte Römer (ECU)										5	0	5
5	Jessy Rompies (INA)										5	0	5
4	Susanne Celik (SWE)							4				4	0
4	Tamara Korpatsch (GER)							4				4	0
4	Marie Bouzková (CZE)							1		3		4	0
4	Lenka Juríková (SVK)									4		4	0
4	Marta Paigina (RUS)									4		4	0
4	Victoria Kan (RUS)								2	1	1	3	1
4	Claudia Giovine (ITA)								1	3		3	1
4	Elixane Lechemia (FRA)									3	1	3	1
4	Vanda Lukács (HUN)									3	1	3	1
4	Magdaléna Pantůčková (CZE)									3	1	3	1
4	Raluca Georgiana Șerban (ROU)									3	1	3	1
4	Catherine Bellis (USA)		1			2			1			2	2
4	Maryna Zanevska (BEL)		1			2			1			2	2
4	Anna Morgina (RUS)		1							2	1	2	2
4	Barbora Štefková (CZE)					1	1	1	1			2	2
4	Anna Blinkova (RUS)						1	1		1	1	2	2
4	Wang Yan (CHN)						1			2	1	2	2
4	Dalma Gálfi (HUN)							2	1		1	2	2
4	Diāna Marcinkēviča (LAT)							1	2	1		2	2
4	Anna Zaja (GER)								2	2		2	2
4	Olga Sáez Larra (ESP)								1	2	1	2	2
4	Karen Barritza (DEN)									2	2	2	2
4	Mariam Bolkvadze (GEO)									2	2	2	2
4	Georgia Brescia (ITA)									2	2	2	2
4	Anastasia Grymalska (ITA)									2	2	2	2
4	Victoria Rodríguez (MEX)									2	2	2	2
4	Kateryna Sliusar (UKR)									2	2	2	2
4	Renata Zarazúa (MEX)									2	2	2	2
4	Anastasia Zarytska (UKR)									2	2	2	2
4	Caitlin Whoriskey (USA)						1	1	2			1	3
4	Aleksandra Pospelova (RUS)						1			1	2	1	3
4	Catalina Pella (ARG)							1	3			1	3
4	Daniela Seguel (CHI)							1	3			1	3
4	Sabrina Santamaria (USA)								1	1	2	1	3
4	Inês Murta (POR)									1	3	1	3
4	Anastasia Vdovenco (MDA)									1	3	1	3
4	Demi Schuurs (NED)		1		1		1		1			0	4
4	You Xiaodi (CHN)		1						2		1	0	4
4	Rika Fujiwara (JPN)		1						2		1	0	4
4	Makoto Ninomiya (JPN)						3		1			0	4
4	Valeriya Strakhova (UKR)						2		1		1	0	4
4	Justyna Jegiołka (POL)								2		2	0	4
4	Ulrikke Eikeri (NOR)								1		3	0	4
4	Madeleine Kobelt (USA)								1		3	0	4
4	Barbara Bonić (SRB)										4	0	4
4	Elena-Teodora Cadar (ROU)										4	0	4
4	Kassandra Davesne (FRA)										4	0	4
4	Sarah Beth Grey (GBR)										4	0	4
4	Petra Januskova (CAN)										4	0	4
4	Olivia Nicholls (GBR)										4	0	4
4	Andreea Amalia Roșca (ROU)										4	0	4
4	Ioana Loredana Roșca (ROU)										4	0	4
4	Ekaterina Yashina (RUS)										4	0	4
3	Rebecca Šramková (SVK)	1						2				3	0
3	Wang Qiang (CHN)					3						3	0
3	Ons Jabeur (TUN)					1		2				3	0
3	Sofya Zhuk (RUS)					1				2		3	0
3	Sabina Sharipova (UZB)							3				3	0
3	Viktoria Kamenskaya (RUS)							2		1		3	0
3	Olesya Pervushina (RUS)							1		2		3	0
3	Paula Ormaechea (ARG)									3		3	0
3	Harmony Tan (FRA)									3		3	0
3	Natalia Vikhlyantseva (RUS)	1						1	1			2	1
3	Antonia Lottner (GER)			1		1			1			2	1
3	Ivana Jorović (SRB)					2	1					2	1
3	Alison Van Uytvanck (BEL)					2	1					2	1
3	Beatriz Haddad Maia (BRA)					2			1			2	1
3	Nigina Abduraimova (UZB)						1	2				2	1
3	Jamie Loeb (USA)						1	2				2	1
3	Lizette Cabrera (AUS)							2	1			2	1
3	Han Na-lae (KOR)							2	1			2	1
3	Richèl Hogenkamp (NED)							2	1			2	1
3	Dalila Jakupović (SLO)							2	1			2	1
3	Tadeja Majerič (SLO)							2	1			2	1
3	Valeriya Solovyeva (RUS)							2	1			2	1
3	Nadia Podoroska (ARG)							1	1	1		2	1
3	Andrea Gámiz (VEN)								1	2		2	1
3	Lisa Sabino (SUI)								1	2		2	1
3	Joséphine Boualem (FRA)									2	1	2	1
3	Estelle Cascino (FRA)									2	1	2	1
3	Martina Di Giuseppe (ITA)									2	1	2	1
3	Anastasia Gasanova (RUS)									2	1	2	1
3	Ilona Georgiana Ghioroaie (ROU)									2	1	2	1
3	María Fernanda Herazo (COL)									2	1	2	1
3	Natalija Kostić (SRB)									2	1	2	1
3	Veronica Miroshnichenko (RUS)									2	1	2	1
3	Tayisiya Morderger (GER)									2	1	2	1
3	Iryna Shymanovich (BLR)									2	1	2	1
3	Katerina Stewart (USA)									2	1	2	1
3	Hsieh Su-wei (TPE)	1	1								1	1	2
3	Hiroko Kuwata (JPN)			1			2					1	2
3	Elise Mertens (BEL)					1	2					1	2
3	Anastasia Frolova (RUS)							1			2	1	2
3	Alice Matteucci (ITA)								2	1		1	2
3	Kim Na-ri (KOR)								1	1	1	1	2
3	Amina Anshba (RUS)									1	2	1	2
3	Alice Balducci (ITA)									1	2	1	2
3	Bianka Békefi (HUN)									1	2	1	2
3	Berfu Cengiz (TUR)									1	2	1	2
3	Britt Geukens (BEL)									1	2	1	2
3	Ylena In-Albon (SUI)									1	2	1	2
3	Melanie Klaffner (AUT)									1	2	1	2
3	Eleni Kordolaimi (GRE)									1	2	1	2
3	Dalila Spiteri (ITA)									1	2	1	2
3	Isabelle Wallace (AUS)									1	2	1	2
3	Maria Sanchez (USA)				1		2					0	3
3	Yang Zhaoxuan (CHN)						2		1			0	3
3	Jocelyn Rae (GBR)						1		2			0	3
3	Anna Smith (GBR)						1		2			0	3
3	Ashley Weinhold (USA)						1		2			0	3
3	Deborah Chiesa (ITA)						1				2	0	3
3	Li Yihong (CHN)						1				2	0	3
3	Ashleigh Barty (AUS)								3			0	3
3	Nicola Geuer (GER)								3			0	3
3	Valentyna Ivakhnenko (RUS)								3			0	3
3	Katarzyna Piter (POL)								3			0	3
3	Kotomi Takahata (JPN)								3			0	3
3	Prarthana Thombare (IND)								3			0	3
3	Freya Christie (GBR)								2		1	0	3
3	Catherine Harrison (USA)								2		1	0	3
3	Naiktha Bains (AUS)								1		2	0	3
3	Amanda Carreras (GBR)								1		2	0	3
3	Harriet Dart (GBR)								1		2	0	3
3	Beatrice Gumulya (INA)								1		2	0	3
3	Vivien Juhászová (SVK)								1		2	0	3
3	Zhang Yukun (CHN)								1		2	0	3
3	Ola Abou Zekry (EGY)										3	0	3
3	Alice Bacquié (FRA)										3	0	3
3	Emilie Francati (DEN)										3	0	3
3	Angelina Gabueva (RUS)										3	0	3
3	Bárbara Gatica (CHI)										3	0	3
3	Veronika Kapshay (UKR)										3	0	3
3	Karin Kennel (SUI)										3	0	3
3	Nastja Kolar (SLO)										3	0	3
3	Pia König (AUT)										3	0	3
3	Nina Kruijer (NED)										3	0	3
3	Emma Laine (FIN)										3	0	3
3	Suzan Lamens (NED)										3	0	3
3	Lee Pei-chi (TPE)										3	0	3
3	Nudnida Luangnam (THA)										3	0	3
3	Samantha Murray (GBR)										3	0	3
3	Olga Parres Azcoitia (ESP)										3	0	3
3	Nina Potočnik (SLO)										3	0	3
3	Kyra Shroff (IND)										3	0	3
3	Alina Silich (RUS)										3	0	3
3	Constanza Vega (ARG)										3	0	3
3	Varunya Wongteanchai (THA)										3	0	3
2	Océane Dodin (FRA)	1						1				2	0
2	Zhang Shuai (CHN)	1						1				2	0
2	Jennifer Brady (USA)			1		1						2	0
2	Han Xinyun (CHN)			1				1				2	0
2	Risa Ozaki (JPN)					2						2	0
2	Aryna Sabalenka (BLR)					2						2	0
2	Chang Kai-chen (TPE)					1		1				2	0
2	Sofia Kenin (USA)					1		1				2	0
2	Anastasia Pivovarova (RUS)					1		1				2	0
2	Sara Sorribes Tormo (ESP)					1		1				2	0
2	Françoise Abanda (CAN)							2				2	0
2	Barbara Haas (AUT)							2				2	0
2	Grace Min (USA)							2				2	0
2	Jeong Su-nam (KOR)							1		1		2	0
2	Tereza Mrdeža (CRO)							1		1		2	0
2	Jasmine Paolini (ITA)							1		1		2	0
2	Jessica Pieri (ITA)							1		1		2	0
2	Giulia Gatto-Monticone (ITA)									2		2	0
2	Eva Guerrero Álvarez (ESP)									2		2	0
2	Victoria Larrière (FRA)									2		2	0
2	Pemra Özgen (TUR)									2		2	0
2	Nuria Párrizas Díaz (ESP)									2		2	0
2	Ioana Diana Pietroiu (ROU)									2		2	0
2	Irina Ramialison (FRA)									2		2	0
2	Sandra Zaniewska (POL)									2		2	0
2	Jennifer Zerbone (FRA)									2		2	0
2	Zuzana Zlochová (SVK)									2		2	0
2	Mandy Minella (LUX)		1	1								1	1
2	Andreea Mitu (ROU)		1					1				1	1
2	Eri Hozumi (JPN)				1			1				1	1
2	Miyu Kato (JPN)				1			1				1	1
2	Kristýna Plíšková (CZE)					1	1					1	1
2	Gabriela Dabrowski (CAN)						1	1				1	1
2	Xu Shilin (CHN)						1	1				1	1
2	Bianca Andreescu (CAN)							1	1			1	1
2	Ysaline Bonaventure (BEL)							1	1			1	1
2	Francesca Di Lorenzo (USA)							1	1			1	1
2	Viktorija Golubic (SUI)							1	1			1	1
2	Lu Jiajing (CHN)							1	1			1	1
2	Peangtarn Plipuech (THA)							1	1			1	1
2	Laura Robson (GBR)							1	1			1	1
2	Olivia Rogowska (AUS)							1	1			1	1
2	Martina Trevisan (ITA)							1	1			1	1
2	Elyne Boeykens (BEL)								1	1		1	1
2	Katharina Gerlach (GER)								1	1		1	1
2	Paula Cristina Gonçalves (BRA)								1	1		1	1
2	Liu Chang (CHN)								1	1		1	1
2	Tang Haochen (CHN)								1	1		1	1
2	Ulyana Ayzatulina (RUS)									1	1	1	1
2	Riya Bhatia (IND)									1	1	1	1
2	Victoria Bosio (ARG)									1	1	1	1
2	Kaitlyn Christian (USA)									1	1	1	1
2	Olga Danilović (SRB)									1	1	1	1
2	Caroline Dolehide (USA)									1	1	1	1
2	Oana Gavrilă (ROU)									1	1	1	1
2	Théo Gravouil (FRA)									1	1	1	1
2	Vivien Heisen (GER)									1	1	1	1
2	Kaja Juvan (SLO)									1	1	1	1
2	Mariya Koryttseva (UKR)									1	1	1	1
2	Miki Miyamura (JPN)									1	1	1	1
2	Silvia Njirić (CRO)									1	1	1	1
2	Dejana Radanović (SRB)									1	1	1	1
2	Snehadevi Reddy (IND)									1	1	1	1
2	Caroline Roméo (FRA)									1	1	1	1
2	Ludmilla Samsonova (ITA)									1	1	1	1
2	Ayano Shimizu (JPN)									1	1	1	1
2	Nina Stadler (SUI)									1	1	1	1
2	Stefanie Tan (SIN)									1	1	1	1
2	Julia Terizyska (BUL)									1	1	1	1
2	Sara Tomic (AUS)									1	1	1	1
2	Panna Udvardy (HUN)									1	1	1	1
2	Margot Yerolymos (FRA)									1	1	1	1
2	Marcela Zacarías (MEX)									1	1	1	1
2	Zhang Ying (CHN)									1	1	1	1
2	Zhao Xiaoxi (CHN)									1	1	1	1
2	Kimberley Zimmermann (BEL)									1	1	1	1
2	Cindy Burger (NED)		1				1					0	2
2	Laura Pous Tió (ESP)		1				1					0	2
2	Renata Voráčová (CZE)				1		1					0	2
2	Zhu Lin (CHN)				1		1					0	2
2	Mihaela Buzărnescu (ROU)						2					0	2
2	An-Sophie Mestach (BEL)						2					0	2
2	Indy de Vroome (NED)						1		1			0	2
2	Cristina Dinu (ROU)						1		1			0	2
2	Hsu Ching-wen (TPE)						1		1			0	2
2	Lesley Kerkhove (NED)						1		1			0	2
2	Jessica Moore (AUS)						1		1			0	2
2	İpek Soylu (TUR)						1		1			0	2
2	Elena Bogdan (ROU)						1				1	0	2
2	Jasmina Tinjić (BIH)						1				1	0	2
2	Xun Fangying (CHN)						1				1	0	2
2	Jacqueline Cako (USA)								2			0	2
2	Gabriela Cé (BRA)								2			0	2
2	Kanae Hisami (JPN)								2			0	2
2	Katarzyna Kawa (POL)								2			0	2
2	Lee Ya-hsuan (TPE)								2			0	2
2	Florencia Molinero (ARG)								2			0	2
2	Ayaka Okuno (JPN)								2			0	2
2	Camilla Rosatello (ITA)								2			0	2
2	Riko Sawayanagi (JPN)								2			0	2
2	Fanny Stollár (HUN)								2			0	2
2	Galina Voskoboeva (KAZ)								2			0	2
2	Eva Wacanno (NED)								2			0	2
2	Ronit Yurovsky (USA)								2			0	2
2	Steffi Distelmans (BEL)								1		1	0	2
2	Erina Hayashi (JPN)								1		1	0	2
2	Anita Husarić (BIH)								1		1	0	2
2	Réka Luca Jani (HUN)								1		1	0	2
2	Anna Klasen (GER)								1		1	0	2
2	Alice Savoretti (ITA)								1		1	0	2
2	Anastasiya Vasylyeva (UKR)								1		1	0	2
2	Jessica Wacnik (USA)								1		1	0	2
2	Frances Altick (USA)										2	0	2
2	Petia Arshinkova (BUL)										2	0	2
2	Kseniia Bekker (RUS)										2	0	2
2	Sophie Chang (USA)										2	0	2
2	Mariana Dražić (CRO)										2	0	2
2	Diana Enache (ROU)										2	0	2
2	Dia Evtimova (BUL)										2	0	2
2	Arabela Fernández Rabener (ESP)										2	0	2
2	Lorraine Guillermo (USA)										2	0	2
2	Guo Hanyu (CHN)										2	0	2
2	Ilze Hattingh (RSA)										2	0	2
2	Katharina Hering (GER)										2	0	2
2	Katherine Ip (HKG)										2	0	2
2	Robu Kajitani (JPN)										2	0	2
2	Madrie Le Roux (RSA)										2	0	2
2	Sarah Lee (USA)										2	0	2
2	Sara Marcionni (ITA)										2	0	2
2	Alexandra Mueller (USA)										2	0	2
2	Victoria Muntean (FRA)										2	0	2
2	Abbie Myers (AUS)										2	0	2
2	Nora Niedmers (GER)										2	0	2
2	Jawairiah Noordin (MAS)										2	0	2
2	Sara Palčič (SLO)										2	0	2
2	Park Sang-hee (KOR)										2	0	2
2	Marine Partaud (FRA)										2	0	2
2	Tatiana Pieri (ITA)										2	0	2
2	Manca Pislak (SLO)										2	0	2
2	Ganna Poznikhirenko (UKR)										2	0	2
2	Gaia Sanesi (ITA)										2	0	2
2	Laëtitia Sarrazin (FRA)										2	0	2
2	Hélène Scholsen (BEL)										2	0	2
2	Angelina Shakhraychuk (UKR)										2	0	2
2	Astra Sharma (AUS)										2	0	2
2	Francesca Stephenson (GBR)										2	0	2
2	Rebeka Stolmár (HUN)										2	0	2
2	Szabina Szlavikovics (HUN)										2	0	2
2	Gabriela Talabă (ROU)										2	0	2
2	Gabriela Nicole Tătăruș (ROU)										2	0	2
2	Xin Yuan (CHN)										2	0	2
2	Zhao Qianqian (CHN)										2	0	2
1	Naomi Broady (GBR)	1										1	0
1	Elitsa Kostova (BUL)	1										1	0
1	Danka Kovinić (MNE)	1										1	0
1	Magda Linette (POL)	1										1	0
1	Pauline Parmentier (FRA)	1										1	0
1	Peng Shuai (CHN)	1										1	0
1	Kateřina Siniaková (CZE)	1										1	0
1	Donna Vekić (CRO)	1										1	0
1	Madison Brengle (USA)					1						1	0
1	Kayla Day (USA)					1						1	0
1	Olga Govortsova (BLR)					1						1	0
1	Karin Knapp (ITA)					1						1	0
1	Elizaveta Kulichkova (RUS)					1						1	0
1	Christina McHale (USA)					1						1	0
1	Marina Melnikova (RUS)					1						1	0
1	Kyōka Okamura (JPN)					1						1	0
1	Rebecca Peterson (SWE)					1						1	0
1	Alison Riske (USA)					1						1	0
1	Evgeniya Rodina (RUS)					1						1	0
1	Sílvia Soler Espinosa (ESP)					1						1	0
1	Stefanie Vögele (SUI)					1						1	0
1	Shiho Akita (JPN)							1				1	0
1	Ana Bogdan (ROU)							1				1	0
1	Sorana Cîrstea (ROU)							1				1	0
1	Danielle Collins (USA)							1				1	0
1	Jaimee Fourlis (AUS)							1				1	0
1	Gao Xinyu (CHN)							1				1	0
1	Myrtille Georges (FRA)							1				1	0
1	Montserrat González (PAR)							1				1	0
1	Jang Su-jeong (KOR)							1				1	0
1	Dayana Yastremska (UKR)							1				1	0
1	Ekaterina Alexandrova (RUS)									1		1	0
1	Tessah Andrianjafitrimo (FRA)									1		1	0
1	Mira Antonitsch (AUT)									1		1	0
1	Sowjanya Bavisetti (IND)									1		1	0
1	Chiraz Bechri (TUN)									1		1	0
1	Katie Boulter (GBR)									1		1	0
1	Lucia Bronzetti (ITA)									1		1	0
1	Miriam Bianca Bulgaru (ROU)									1		1	0
1	Nastassja Burnett (ITA)									1		1	0
1	Sara Cakarevic (FRA)									1		1	0
1	Alba Carrillo Marín (ESP)									1		1	0
1	Hanna Chang (USA)									1		1	0
1	Nicole Coopersmith (USA)									1		1	0
1	Vesna Dolonc (SRB)									1		1	0
1	Cristina Ene (ROU)									1		1	0
1	Başak Eraydın (TUR)									1		1	0
1	Julieta Lara Estable (ARG)									1		1	0
1	Katharine Fahey (USA)									1		1	0
1	Claire Feuerstein (FRA)									1		1	0
1	Manisha Foster (GBR)									1		1	0
1	Magdalena Fręch (POL)									1		1	0
1	Julie Gervais (FRA)									1		1	0
1	Ekaterine Gorgodze (GEO)									1		1	0
1	Ellie Halbauer (USA)									1		1	0
1	Samantha Harris (AUS)									1		1	0
1	Dea Herdželaš (BIH)									1		1	0
1	Priscilla Hon (AUS)									1		1	0
1	Hong Seung-yeon (KOR)									1		1	0
1	Katarina Jokić (SRB)									1		1	0
1	Yuliya Kalabina (RUS)									1		1	0
1	Deniz Khazaniuk (ISR)									1		1	0
1	Mizuno Kijima (JPN)									1		1	0
1	Miriam Kolodziejová (CZE)									1		1	0
1	Vera Lapko (BLR)									1		1	0
1	Lee Hua-chen (TPE)									1		1	0
1	Noppawan Lertcheewakarn (THA)									1		1	0
1	Li Yixuan (CHN)									1		1	0
1	Liu Fangzhou (CHN)									1		1	0
1	Sinéad Lohan (IRL)									1		1	0
1	María José Luque Moreno (ESP)									1		1	0
1	Bojana Marinković (SRB)									1		1	0
1	Ani Mijačika (CRO)									1		1	0
1	Greet Minnen (BEL)									1		1	0
1	Tara Moore (GBR)									1		1	0
1	Karolína Muchová (CZE)									1		1	0
1	Brenda Njuki (SWE)									1		1	0
1	Camilla Scala (ITA)									1		1	0
1	Laura Schaeder (GER)									1		1	0
1	Patty Schnyder (SUI)									1		1	0
1	Bibiane Schoofs (NED)									1		1	0
1	Kennedy Shaffer (USA)									1		1	0
1	Milana Spremo (SRB)									1		1	0
1	Julyette Steur (GER)									1		1	0
1	Piia Suomalainen (FIN)									1		1	0
1	Iga Świątek (POL)									1		1	0
1	Bunyawi Thamchaiwat (THA)									1		1	0
1	Kateřina Vaňková (CZE)									1		1	0
1	Markéta Vondroušová (CZE)									1		1	0
1	Marianna Zakarlyuk (UKR)									1		1	0
1	Nao Hibino (JPN)		1									0	1
1	Nicole Melichar (USA)		1									0	1
1	Yuki Naito (JPN)		1									0	1
1	Alicja Rosolska (POL)		1									0	1
1	Wang Yafan (CHN)		1									0	1
1	Julia Glushko (ISR)				1							0	1
1	Alexandra Panova (RUS)				1							0	1
1	Martina Colmegna (ITA)						1					0	1
1	Sanaz Marand (USA)						1					0	1
1	Lidziya Marozava (BLR)						1					0	1
1	Melanie Oudin (USA)						1					0	1
1	Ankita Raina (IND)						1					0	1
1	Storm Sanders (AUS)						1					0	1
1	Luisa Stefani (BRA)						1					0	1
1	Emily Webley-Smith (GBR)						1					0	1
1	Monique Adamczak (AUS)								1			0	1
1	Alison Bai (AUS)								1			0	1
1	Marie Benoît (BEL)								1			0	1
1	Choi Ji-hee (KOR)								1			0	1
1	Eleni Daniilidou (GRE)								1			0	1
1	Vitalia Diatchenko (RUS)								1			0	1
1	Jana Fett (CRO)								1			0	1
1	Sharon Fichman (CAN)								1			0	1
1	Ingrid Gamarra Martins (BRA)								1			0	1
1	Han Sung-hee (KOR)								1			0	1
1	Lauren Herring (USA)								1			0	1
1	Michaela Hončová (SVK)								1			0	1
1	Hsu Chieh-yu (TPE)								1			0	1
1	Jiang Xinyu (CHN)								1			0	1
1	Lyudmyla Kichenok (UKR)								1			0	1
1	Nadiia Kichenok (UKR)								1			0	1
1	Xenia Knoll (SUI)								1			0	1
1	Kateřina Kramperová (CZE)								1			0	1
1	Lenka Kunčíková (CZE)								1			0	1
1	Danielle Lao (USA)								1			0	1
1	Alizé Lim (FRA)								1			0	1
1	Tammi Patterson (AUS)								1			0	1
1	Shérazad Reix (FRA)								1			0	1
1	Charlotte Robillard-Millette (CAN)								1			0	1
1	Nika Shytkouskaya (BLR)								1			0	1
1	Karolína Stuchlá (CZE)								1			0	1
1	Tang Qianhui (CHN)								1			0	1
1	Abigail Tere-Apisah (PNG)								1			0	1
1	Tian Ran (CHN)								1			0	1
1	Olivia Tjandramulia (AUS)								1			0	1
1	Stephanie Vogt (LIE)								1			0	1
1	Ana Vrljić (CRO)								1			0	1
1	Jarmila Wolfe (AUS)								1			0	1
1	Varatchaya Wongteanchai (THA)								1			0	1
1	Yoo Mi (KOR)								1			0	1
1	Cristina Adamescu (ROU)										1	0	1
1	Maria Fernanda Alves (BRA)										1	0	1
1	Federica Arcidiacono (ITA)										1	0	1
1	Mathilde Armitano (FRA)										1	0	1
1	Gioia Barbieri (ITA)										1	0	1
1	Prerna Bhambri (IND)										1	0	1
1	Federica Bilardo (ITA)										1	0	1
1	Michaela Boev (BEL)										1	0	1
1	Alexa Bortles (USA)										1	0	1
1	Lea Bošković (CRO)										1	0	1
1	Natasha Bredl (AUT)										1	0	1
1	Lou Brouleau (FRA)										1	0	1
1	Olga Brózda (POL)										1	0	1
1	Irene Burillo Escorihuela (ESP)										1	0	1
1	Shivika Burman (IND)										1	0	1
1	Yvonne Cavallé Reimers (ESP)										1	0	1
1	Sai Samhitha Chamarthi (IND)										1	0	1
1	Catherine Chantraine (BEL)										1	0	1
1	Chen Jiahui (CHN)										1	0	1
1	Chien Pei-ju (TPE)										1	0	1
1	Nidhi Chilumula (IND)										1	0	1
1	Cho I-hsuan (TPE)										1	0	1
1	Eudice Chong (HKG)										1	0	1
1	Giada Clerici (ITA)										1	0	1
1	Fiona Codino (FRA)										1	0	1
1	Andie Daniell (USA)										1	0	1
1	Alessia Dario (ITA)										1	0	1
1	Yanina Darishina (RUS)										1	0	1
1	Lucía de la Puerta Uribe (ESP)										1	0	1
1	Corinna Dentoni (ITA)										1	0	1
1	Zeel Desai (IND)										1	0	1
1	Mathilde Devits (BEL)										1	0	1
1	Jazzamay Drew (GBR)										1	0	1
1	Cristiana Ferrando (ITA)										1	0	1
1	Ángela Fita Boluda (ESP)										1	0	1
1	Weronika Foryś (POL)										1	0	1
1	Sofya Golubovskaya (RUS)										1	0	1
1	Nagi Hanatani (JPN)										1	0	1
1	Arianne Hartono (NED)										1	0	1
1	Verena Hofer (ITA)										1	0	1
1	Paige Mary Hourigan (NZL)										1	0	1
1	Hsieh Shu-ying (TPE)										1	0	1
1	Luisa Marie Huber (GER)										1	0	1
1	Emma Hurst (GBR)										1	0	1
1	Caroline Ilowska (AUT)										1	0	1
1	Jana Jablonovská (SVK)										1	0	1
1	Sandra Jamrichová (SVK)										1	0	1
1	Francisca Jorge (POR)										1	0	1
1	Jung So-hee (KOR)										1	0	1
1	Haruka Kaji (JPN)										1	0	1
1	Kang Jiaqi (CHN)										1	0	1
1	Ekaterina Kazionova (RUS)										1	0	1
1	Magali Kempen (BEL)										1	0	1
1	Diana Khodan (UKR)										1	0	1
1	Kim Ju-eun (KOR)										1	0	1
1	Julia Kimmelmann (GER)										1	0	1
1	Aneta Kladivová (CZE)										1	0	1
1	Maryna Kolb (UKR)										1	0	1
1	Nadiya Kolb (UKR)										1	0	1
1	Franziska Kommer (GER)										1	0	1
1	Sofiya Kovalets (UKR)										1	0	1
1	Shelly Krolitzky (ISR)										1	0	1
1	Nika Kukharchuk (RUS)										1	0	1
1	Nathaly Kurata (BRA)										1	0	1
1	Aneta Laboutková (CZE)										1	0	1
1	Ksenia Laskutova (RUS)										1	0	1
1	Kélia Le Bihan (FRA)										1	0	1
1	Emma Léné (FRA)										1	0	1
1	Yuliana Lizarazo (COL)										1	0	1
1	Daria Lodikova (RUS)										1	0	1
1	Daniela Macarena López (CHI)										1	0	1
1	Lu Jiaxi (CHN)										1	0	1
1	Tena Lukas (CRO)										1	0	1
1	Sabina Machalová (CZE)										1	0	1
1	Ashley Mackey (USA)										1	0	1
1	Lisa-Marie Mätschke (GER)										1	0	1
1	Tereza Malíková (CZE)										1	0	1
1	Guiomar Maristany (ESP)										1	0	1
1	María Martínez Martínez (ESP)										1	0	1
1	Maria Masini (ITA)										1	0	1
1	Mai Minokoshi (JPN)										1	0	1
1	Mihoki Miyahara (JPN)										1	0	1
1	Yana Morderger (GER)										1	0	1
1	Alexandra Morozova (USA)										1	0	1
1	Yvonne Neuwirth (AUT)										1	0	1
1	Nikola Novotná (CZE)										1	0	1
1	Marta Oliveira (POR)										1	0	1
1	Fanny Östlund (SWE)										1	0	1
1	Alana Parnaby (AUS)										1	0	1
1	Pauline Payet (FRA)										1	0	1
1	Sally Peers (AUS)										1	0	1
1	Bernarda Pera (USA)										1	0	1
1	Stephanie Mariel Petit (ARG)										1	0	1
1	Eduarda Piai (BRA)										1	0	1
1	Anna Popescu (ROU)										1	0	1
1	Anastasia Pribylova (RUS)										1	0	1
1	Iva Primorac (CRO)										1	0	1
1	Anna Maria Procacci (ITA)										1	0	1
1	Chiara Quattrone (ITA)										1	0	1
1	Shweta Chandra Rana (IND)										1	0	1
1	Polona Reberšak (SLO)										1	0	1
1	Anna Remondina (ITA)										1	0	1
1	Nicole Rottmann (AUT)										1	0	1
1	Erin Routliffe (CAN)										1	0	1
1	Laura Sainsbury (GBR)										1	0	1
1	Sandra Samir (EGY)										1	0	1
1	Ana Sofía Sánchez (MEX)										1	0	1
1	Theiviya Selvarajoo (MAS)										1	0	1
1	Marina Shamayko (RUS)										1	0	1
1	Ksenija Sharifova (RUS)										1	0	1
1	Jelena Simić (BIH)										1	0	1
1	Kristina Smith (USA)										1	0	1
1	Lucrezia Stefanini (ITA)										1	0	1
1	Jelena Stojanovic (AUS)										1	0	1
1	Maya Tahan (ISR)										1	0	1
1	Alena Tarasova (RUS)										1	0	1
1	Gabriella Taylor (GBR)										1	0	1
1	Marie Témin (FRA)										1	0	1
1	Sadafmoh Tolibova (BLR)										1	0	1
1	Janina Toljan (AUT)										1	0	1
1	Nikola Tomanová (CZE)										1	0	1
1	Petra Uberalová (SVK)										1	0	1
1	Phillis Vanenburg (NED)										1	0	1
1	Ani Vangelova (BUL)										1	0	1
1	Kelly Versteeg (NED)										1	0	1
1	Veronika Vlkovská (CZE)										1	0	1
1	Erika Vogelsang (NED)										1	0	1
1	Lisa Whybourn (GBR)										1	0	1
1	Ye Qiuyu (CHN)										1	0	1
1	Yu Min-hwa (KOR)										1	0	1
1	Valeriya Zeleva (RUS)										1	0	1
1	Angelina Zhuravleva (RUS)										1	0	1
1	Michele Alexandra Zmău (ROU)										1	0	1
1	Vendula Žovincová (CZE)										1	0	1

=== Titles won by nation ===
Updated as of 31 December

Total	Nation	$100K		$75K		$50K		$25K		$10K		Total	
Total	Nation	S	D	S	D	S	D	S	D	S	D	S	D
140	Russia (RUS)	1	3		1	8	5	23	24	35	40	67	73
95	United States (USA)		2	1	1	9	13	9	14	16	30	35	60
79	Romania (ROU)		2				3	4	3	23	44	27	52
66	Italy (ITA)					1	1	4	5	24	31	29	37
59	Germany (GER)			1		1	2	4	5	26	20	32	27
58	France (FRA)	2						2	2	27	25	31	27
50	China (CHN)	3	2	1	1	3	6	6	6	11	11	24	26
50	Ukraine (UKR)		2			1	2	2	5	9	29	12	38
47	Slovakia (SVK)	1	1					4	6	16	19	21	26
47	Netherlands (NED)		1		2	1	8	7	10	4	14	12	35
44	Czech Republic (CZE)	1			1	2	3	2	3	17	15	22	22
40	Japan (JPN)		2	1	1	3	6	6	11	3	7	13	27
37	Australia (AUS)						3	5	10	5	14	10	27
34	Hungary (HUN)							2	4	9	19	11	23
34	United Kingdom (GBR)	1					2	1	5	3	22	5	29
33	Belgium (BEL)					4	4	1	4	6	14	11	22
32	Serbia (SRB)		2			3	1	1	2	8	15	12	20
30	Spain (ESP)		2			2	1	2	3	10	10	14	16
28	Bulgaria (BUL)	1				1	1	4	6	7	8	13	15
27	Switzerland (SUI)					1	1	4	6	7	8	12	15
26	Turkey (TUR)						1		1	14	10	14	12
25	Brazil (BRA)					2	1		8	4	10	6	19
24	Argentina (ARG)							2	7	6	9	8	16
23	Slovenia (SLO)							8	5	3	7	11	12
23	India (IND)						1		3	4	15	4	19
21	Belarus (BLR)					3	1		1	5	11	8	13
19	Greece (GRE)							1	6	2	10	3	16
18	Sweden (SWE)					1		4	3	4	6	9	9
18	Austria (AUT)							2		3	13	5	13
17	Poland (POL)	1	1						7	4	4	5	12
16	Chile (CHI)							1	3	3	9	4	12
14	South Korea (KOR)							4	3	3	4	7	7
14	Chinese Taipei (TPE)	1	1			1	1	1	3	1	5	4	10
12	Croatia (CRO)	1						1	2	3	5	5	7
12	Canada (CAN)						1	4	2		5	4	8
11	Israel (ISR)				1					2	8	3	8
10	Macedonia (MKD)						2	1	4	2	1	3	7
10	Montenegro (MNE)	1							1	1	7	2	8
10	Bosnia and Herzegovina (BIH)		1				1		2	1	5	1	9
9	Kazakhstan (KAZ)								2	5	2	5	4
9	Mexico (MEX)									5	4	5	4
9	Moldova (MDA)									5	4	5	4
9	Thailand (THA)							1	2	2	4	3	6
9	Denmark (DEN)									3	6	3	6
9	Paraguay (PAR)							1			8	1	8
8	South Africa (RSA)								1	2	5	2	6
7	Uzbekistan (UZB)						1	5			1	5	2
6	Liechtenstein (LIE)							1	2	3		4	2
6	Indonesia (INA)								1		5	0	6
5	Georgia (GEO)									3	2	3	2
5	Cambodia (CAM)									2	3	2	3
5	Ecuador (ECU)										5	0	5
5	Portugal (POR)										5	0	5
4	Tunisia (TUN)					1		2		1		4	0
4	Latvia (LAT)						1		1	2		2	2
4	Colombia (COL)									2	2	2	2
4	Finland (FIN)									1	3	1	3
4	Norway (NOR)								1		3	0	4
4	Egypt (EGY)										4	0	4
3	Venezuela (VEN)								1	2		2	1
3	Singapore (SIN)									2	1	2	1
2	Luxembourg (LUX)		1	1								1	1
2	Hong Kong (HKG)										2	0	2
2	Malaysia (MAS)										2	0	2
1	Ireland (IRL)									1		1	0
1	Papua New Guinea (PNG)								1			0	1
1	New Zealand (NZL)										1	0	1

== See also ==
- 2016 WTA Tour
- 2016 WTA 125K series
- 2016 ATP World Tour
- 2016 ATP Challenger Tour
- 2016 ITF Men's Circuit
