= Karolína Muchová career statistics =

Career finals
Discipline	Type	Won	Lost	Total
Singles	Grand Slam	–	2	2
Singles	WTA Finals	–	–	0
Singles	WTA 1000	1	2	3
Singles	WTA 500	1	1	2
Singles	WTA 250	1	2	3
Singles	Olympics	–	–	0
Singles	Total	3	7	10
Doubles	Grand Slam	–	–	0
Doubles	WTA Finals	–	–	0
Doubles	WTA 1000	–	–	0
Doubles	WTA 500	–	–	0
Doubles	WTA 250	–	–	0
Doubles	Olympics	–	–	0
Doubles	Total	0	0	0
Mixed	Grand Slam	1	–	1
Mixed	WTA 1000	–	–	0
Mixed	Olympics	–	–	0
Mixed	Total	1	0	1

This is a list of the main career statistics of professional Czech tennis player Karolína Muchová. She has won three singles titles, including one at WTA 1000-level at the 2026 Qatar Open. She is widely acclaimed for her majors performances, her most notable being at the 2023 French Open, where she reached the final but lost to world No. 1, Iga Świątek. At the 2021 Australian Open, she shocked then-world No. 1, Ashleigh Barty. Two years later, she came to another major semifinal, this time at the US Open. Along with that, she has reached two back-to-back quarterfinals at Wimbledon Championships (2019 and 2021). (Note: Tournament was not held in 2020 due to COVID-19.) In August 2023, she made her debut in the top 10 of the WTA rankings, after reaching the final of the WTA 1000 Cincinnati Open.

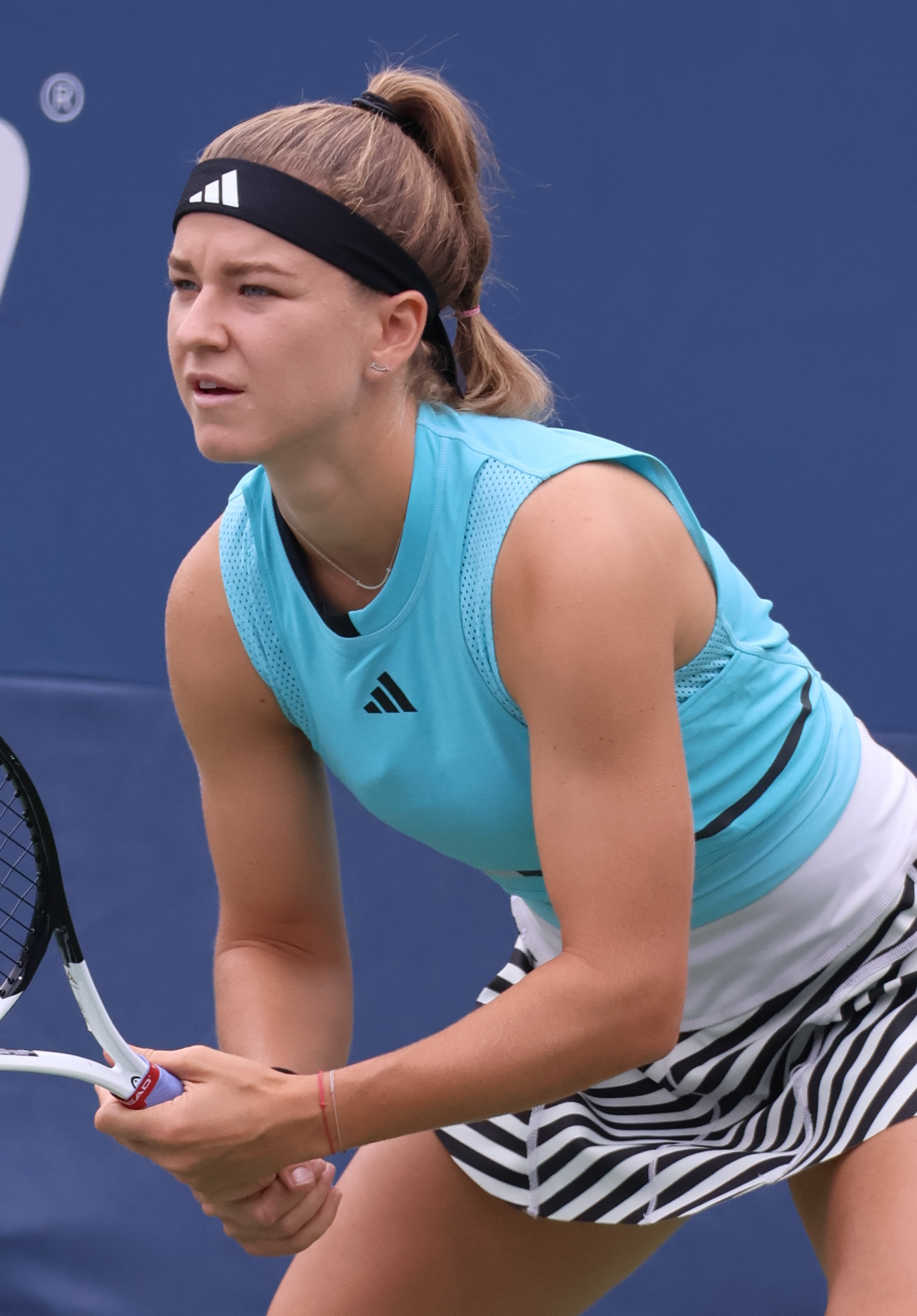
Muchová at the 2023 US Open

== Performance timelines ==
Key
W	F	SF	QF	#R	RR	Q#	P#	DNQ	A	Z#	PO	G	S	B	NMS	NTI	P	NH

(W) winner; (F) finalist; (SF) semifinalist; (QF) quarterfinalist; (#R) rounds 4, 3, 2, 1; (RR) round-robin stage; (Q#) qualification round; (P#) preliminary round; (DNQ) did not qualify; (A) absent; (Z#) Davis/Fed Cup Zonal Group (with number indication) or (PO) play-off; (G) gold, (S) silver or (B) bronze Olympic/Paralympic medal; (NMS) not a Masters tournament; (NTI) not a Tier I tournament; (P) postponed; (NH) not held; (SR) strike rate (events won / competed); (W–L) win–loss record.
To avoid confusion and double counting, these charts are updated at the conclusion of a tournament or when the player's participation has ended.

Only main-draw results in WTA Tour, Grand Slam tournaments, Billie Jean King Cup (Fed Cup), Hopman Cup, United Cup and Olympic Games are included in win–loss records.

=== Singles ===
Current through the 2026 WTA Finals.

Tournament	2016	2017	2018	2019	2020	2021	2022	2023	2024	2025	2026	SR	W–L	Win %
Grand Slam tournaments
Australian Open	A	A	A	1R	2R	SF	A	2R	A	2R	4R	0 / 6	11–6	65%
French Open	A	A	Q1	2R	1R	3R	3R	F	A	1R	3R	0 / 7	13–7	65%
Wimbledon	A	A	Q2	QF	NH	QF	1R	1R	1R	1R	F	0 / 7	14–7	67%
US Open	Q1	A	3R	3R	4R	1R	1R	SF	SF	QF	3R	0 / 9	23–9	72%
Win–Loss	0–0	0–0	2–1	7–4	4–3	11–4	2–3	12–4	5–2	5–4	13–4	0 / 29	61–29	68%
Year-end championships
WTA Finals	DNQ				NH	DNQ		A	DNQ		RR	0 / 1	0–2	0%
WTA Elite Trophy	DNQ			SF	NH			A	NH			0 / 1	2–1	67%
National representation
Billie Jean King Cup (Note: Formerly known as Fed Cup until 2020.)	A	A	A	QF	A (Note: Edition is split into the two years due to COVID-19.)		SF	SF	A	A	W	1 / 4	4–1	80%
Summer Olympics	A	NH				A	NH		1R	NH		0 / 1	0–1	0%
WTA 1000 tournaments
Qatar Open	A	NTI	A	NTI	2R	NTI	A	NTI	A	A	W	1 / 2	7–1	88%
Dubai Championships	NTI	A	NTI	A	NTI	A	NTI	QF (Note: Withdrawal during the tournament is not counted as a loss.)	A	SF	A	0 / 2	7–1	88%
Indian Wells Open	A	A	A	A	NH	A	A	QF	A	4R	4R	0 / 3	8–3	73%
Miami Open	A	A	A	2R	NH	A	3R	3R	A	3R	SF	0 / 5	10–4	71%
Madrid Open	A	A	A	A	NH	QF	2R	2R	A	A	A	0 / 3	5–3	63%
Italian Open	A	A	A	A	A	A	1R	4R	A	A	2R	0 / 3	3–3	50%
Canadian Open	A	A	A	A	NH	1R	A	3R	A	4R	A	0 / 3	4–3	57%
Cincinnati Open	A	A	A	A	2R	3R	A	F	2R	3R	A	0 / 5	10–5	67%
China Open	A	A	A	1R	NH			A	F	4R	QF	0 / 4	11–4	73%
Wuhan Open	A	A	A	A	NH				A	2R	3R	0 / 2	2–2	50%
Win–Loss	0–0	0–0	0–0	1–2	2–2	5–3	3–2	20–6	7–2	13–7	16–5	1 / 32	67–29	70%
Career statistics
	2016	2017	2018	2019	2020	2021	2022	2023	2024	2025	2026	SR	W–L	Win %
Tournaments	0	1	1	14	8	11	9	14	8	15	15	Career total: 96		
Titles	0	0	0	1	0	0	0	0	0	0	2	Career total: 3		
Finals	0	0	0	2	0	0	0	2	2	0	4	Career total: 10		
Hard win–loss	0–0	0–1	2–1	18–9	7–7	10–4	6–4	26–9	15–4	25–14	26–9	2 / 64	135–62	69%
Clay win–loss	0–0	0–0	0–0	6–2	0–1	5–3	3–3	10–3	4–2	0–1	6–3	0 / 18	34–18	65%
Grass win–loss	0–0	0–0	0–0	4–2	0–0	4–2	0–2	0–1	2–1	1–2	11–2	1 / 14	22–12	65%
Overall win–loss	0–0	0–1	2–1	28–13	7–8	19–9	9–9	36–13	21–7	26–17	43–14	3 / 96	191–92	67%
Win %	–	0%	67%	68%	47%	68%	50%	73%	75%	60%	75%	Career total: 67%		
Year-end ranking (Note: 2014: WTA ranking – 733, 2015: WTA ranking – 419.)	208	272	145	21	27	32	149	8	22	19	8	$15,594,202		

=== Doubles ===
Current through the 2026 Wuhan Open.

Tournament	2017	2018	2019	2020	2021	2022	2023	2024	2025	2026	SR	W–L	Win %
Grand Slam tournaments
Australian Open	A	A	A	1R	A	A	A	A	A	A	0 / 1	0–1	0%
French Open	A	A	1R	A	A	A	A	A	A	A	0 / 1	0–1	0%
Wimbledon	A	A	A	NH	A	A	A	A	A	A	0 / 0	0–0	–
US Open	A	A	2R	A	A	A	A	A	A	A	0 / 1	1–1	50%
Win–Loss	0–0	0–0	1–2	0–1	0–0	0–0	0–0	0–0	0–0	0–0	0 / 3	1–3	25%
National representation
Summer Olympics	Not Held				A	Not Held		4th	Not Held		0 / 1	3–2	60%
WTA 1000 tournaments
Qatar Open	NTI	A	NTI	A	NTI	A	NTI	A	A	A	0 / 0	0–0	–
Dubai Championships	A	NTI	A	NTI	A	NTI	A	A	A	A	0 / 0	0–0	–
Indian Wells Open	A	A	A	NH	A	A	A	A	A	A	0 / 0	0–0	–
Miami Open	A	A	A	NH	A	A	A	A	A	A	0 / 0	0–0	–
Madrid Open	A	A	A	NH	A	2R	A	A	A	A	0 / 1	1–0	100%
Italian Open	A	A	A	A	A	A	A	A	A	A	0 / 0	0–0	–
Canadian Open	A	A	A	NH	2R	A	2R	A	A	A	0 / 2	2–2	50%
Cincinnati Open	A	A	A	1R	A	A	A	A	A	A	0 / 1	0–1	0%
China Open	A	A	A	Not Held			A	2R	SF	A	0 / 2	4–0	100%
Wuhan Open	A	A	A	Not Held				A	A	A	0 / 0	0–0	–
Win–Loss	0–0	0–0	0–0	0–1	1–1	1–0	1–1	1–0	3–0	0–0	0 / 6	7–3	70%
Career statistics
	2017	2018	2019	2020	2021	2022	2023	2024	2025	2026	SR	W–L	Win %
Tournaments	1	0	2	4	4	1	2	2	1	2	Career total: 19		
Overall win–loss	0–1	0–0	1–2	1–3	3–3	2–1	1–2	4–2	3–0	1–2	0 / 19	16–16	50%
Year-end ranking (Note: 2014: WTA ranking – 846, 2015: WTA ranking – 608, 2016: WTA ranking – 531.)	700	877	433	367	316	498	566	525	216				

=== Mixed doubles ===
Current through the 2026 US Open.

Tournament	2025	2026	SR	W–L	Win %
Grand Slam tournaments
Australian Open	A	A	0 / 0	0–0	–
French Open	A	A	0 / 0	0–0	–
Wimbledon	A	A	0 / 0	0–0	–
US Open	QF	W	1 / 2	5–1	83%
Win–Loss	1–1	4–0	1 / 2	5–1	83%

== Grand Slam tournaments finals ==
=== Singles: 2 (2 runner-ups) ===
Result	Year	Tournament	Surface	Opponent	Score
Loss	2023	French Open	Clay	(Poland) Iga Świątek	2–6, 7–5, 4–6
Loss	2026	Wimbledon	Grass	(Czech Republic) Linda Nosková	2–6, 7–5, 3–6

=== Mixed doubles: 1 (title) ===
Result	Year	Tournament	Surface	Partner	Opponents	Score
Win	2026	US Open	Hard	(Czech Republic) Jakub Menšík	(Switzerland) Belinda Bencic (Italy) Flavio Cobolli	6–3, 1–6, [10–6]

== Other significant finals ==
=== WTA 1000 tournaments ===
==== Singles: 3 (1 title, 2 runner-ups) ====
Result	Year	Tournament	Surface	Opponent	Score
Loss	2023	Cincinnati Open	Hard	(United States) Coco Gauff	3–6, 4–6
Loss	2024	China Open	Hard	(United States) Coco Gauff	1–6, 3–6
Win	2026	Qatar Open	Hard	(Canada) Victoria Mboko	6–4, 7–5

=== Summer Olympics ===
==== Doubles: 1 (4th place) ====
Result	Year	Tournament	Surface	Partner	Opponents	Score
4th place	2024	Paris Olympics, France	Clay	(Czech Republic) Linda Nosková	(Spain) Cristina Bucșa (Spain) Sara Sorribes Tormo	2–6, 2–6

== WTA Tour finals ==
=== Singles: 10 (3 titles, 7 runner-ups) ===
Legend Grand Slam (0–2) WTA 1000 (1–2) WTA 500 (1–1) International / WTA 250 (1–2)	Finals by surface Hard (2–2) Clay (0–4) Grass (1–1)	Finals by setting Outdoor (3–6) Indoor (0–1)

Result	W–L	Date	Tournament	Tier	Surface	Opponent	Score
Loss	0–1	May 2019	Prague Open, Czech Republic	International	Clay	(Switzerland) Jil Teichmann	6–7^{(5–7)}, 6–3, 4–6
Win	1–1	Sep 2019	Korea Open, South Korea	International	Hard	(Poland) Magda Linette	6–1, 6–1
Loss	1–2	Jun 2023	French Open, France	Grand Slam	Clay	(Poland) Iga Świątek	2–6, 7–5, 4–6
Loss	1–3	Aug 2023	Cincinnati Open, United States	WTA 1000	Hard	(United States) Coco Gauff	3–6, 4–6
Loss	1–4	Jul 2024	Palermo Ladies Open, Italy	WTA 250	Clay	(China) Zheng Qinwen	4–6, 6–4, 2–6
Loss	1–5	Oct 2024	China Open, China	WTA 1000	Hard	(United States) Coco Gauff	1–6, 3–6
Win	2–5	Feb 2026	Qatar Open, Qatar	WTA 1000	Hard	(Canada) Victoria Mboko	6–4, 7–5
Loss	2–6	Apr 2026	Stuttgart Open, Germany	WTA 500	Clay (i)	(Kazakhstan) Elena Rybakina	5–7, 1–6
Win	3–6	Jun 2026	Bad Homburg Open, Germany	WTA 500	Grass	(Japan) Naomi Osaka	6–1, 1–0 ret.
Loss	3–7	Jul 2026	Wimbledon, United Kingdom	Grand Slam	Grass	(Czech Republic) Linda Nosková	2–6, 7–5, 3–6

== ITF Circuit finals ==
=== Singles: 10 (2 titles, 8 runner-ups) ===
Legend
80k tournaments (0–2)
50k / 60k tournaments (0–2)
25k tournaments (0–2)
10k tournaments (2–2)

Result	W–L	Date	Tournament	Tier	Surface	Opponent	Score
Win	1–0	Aug 2014	ITF Michalovce, Slovakia	10k	Clay	(Slovakia) Jana Jablonovská	6–3, 6–1
Loss	1–1	Feb 2016	ITF Trnava, Slovakia	10k	Hard (i)	(Russia) Ekaterina Alexandrova	1–6, 3–6
Loss	1–2	Mar 2016	ITF Sharm El Sheikh, Egypt	10k	Hard	(Russia) Anna Morgina	6–1, 0–6, 3–6
Win	2–2	Mar 2016	ITF Sharm El Sheikh, Egypt	10k	Hard	(Russia) Anastasiya Komardina	6–0, 6–2
Loss	2–3	May 2016	Hódmezővásárhely Ladies Open, Hungary	25k	Clay	(Slovenia) Tamara Zidanšek	6–4, 2–6, 4–6
Loss	2–4	Jun 2016	Bredeney Ladies Open, Germany	50k	Clay	(Spain) Sara Sorribes Tormo	6–7^{(5–7)}, 4–6
Loss	2–5	Jul 2017	Prague Open, Czech Republic	80k	Clay	(Czech Republic) Markéta Vondroušová	5–7, 1–6
Loss	2–6	Feb 2018	AK Ladies Open, Germany	25k	Carpet (i)	(United Kingdom) Harriet Dart	6–7^{(5–7)}, 2–6
Loss	2–7	Mar 2018	Open de Seine-et-Marne, France	60k	Hard (i)	(Russia) Anna Blinkova	w/o
Loss	2–8	Jul 2018	ITS Cup Olomouc, Czech Republic	80k+H	Clay	(France) Fiona Ferro	4–6, 4–6

=== Doubles: 3 (1 title, 2 runner-ups) ===
Legend
25k tournaments (0–1)
10k / 15k tournaments (1–1)

Result	W–L	Date	Tournament	Tier	Surface	Partner	Opponents	Score
Win	1–0	Sep 2014	ITF Hluboká nad Vltavou, Czech Republic	10k	Clay	(Slovakia) Jana Jablonovská	(Czech Republic) Veronika Kolářová (Czech Republic) Petra Krejsová	7–6^{(7–2)}, 7–5
Loss	1–1	Nov 2014	ITF Zawada, Poland	25k	Carpet (i)	(Czech Republic) Gabriela Chmelinová	(Ukraine) Anhelina Kalinina (Ukraine) Anna Shkudun	0–6, 6–7^{(3–7)}
Loss	1–2	Mar 2017	ITF Antalya, Turkey	15k	Clay	(Czech Republic) Barbora Miklová	(Russia) Anastasia Frolova (Russia) Alena Tarasova	5–7, 1–6

== National representation ==
=== Billie Jean King Cup ===
Key
W	F	SF	QF	#R	RR	Q#	P#	DNQ	A	Z#	PO	G	S	B	NMS	NTI	P	NH

(W) winner; (F) finalist; (SF) semifinalist; (QF) quarterfinalist; (#R) rounds 4, 3, 2, 1; (RR) round-robin stage; (Q#) qualification round; (P#) preliminary round; (DNQ) did not qualify; (A) absent; (Z#) Davis/Fed Cup Zonal Group (with number indication) or (PO) play-off; (G) gold, (S) silver or (B) bronze Olympic/Paralympic medal; (NMS) not a Masters tournament; (NTI) not a Tier I tournament; (P) postponed; (NH) not held; (SR) strike rate (events won / competed); (W–L) win–loss record.
To avoid confusion and double counting, these charts are updated at the conclusion of a tournament or when the player's participation has ended.

Matches by group World Group / Finals (5–2)	Matches by round Rounds (3–2) Playoffs (2–0)	Matches by surface Hard (3–2) Clay (2–0)	Matches by type Singles (4–1) Doubles (1–1)	Matches by setting Indoors (4–2) Outdoors (1–0)	Matches by venue Czech Republic (2–0) Away (3–2)

- Muchová has a 8–1 record in ties, with:
  - 5 nominations
  - 7 ties played

Tier						Match					
Result	W–L	Date	Round	Location	Surface	Result	W–L	Rubber	Type + Partner	Opponent nation	Opponent player(s)
Win (4–0)	1–0	Apr 2019	WG PO	Prostějov, CZE	Clay (i)	Win (6–3, 6–0)	1–0	I	Singles	Canada	Rebecca Marino
Win (4–0)	1–0	Apr 2019	WG PO	Prostějov, CZE	Clay (i)	not played	—	IV	Singles	Canada	Leylah Fernandez
Win (3–2)	2–0	Apr 2022	F QR	Prague, CZE	Clay	Win (6–1, 7–5)	2–0	V	Doubles (with Markéta Vondroušová)	(United Kingdom) Great Britain	Harriet Dart; Katie Swan
Win (2–1)	3–0	Nov 2022	F RR	Glasgow, SCO	Hard (i)	Win (6–2, 6–2)	3–0	I	Singles	Poland	Magdalena Fręch
Win (2–1)	4–0	Nov 2022	F RR	Glasgow, SCO	Hard (i)	Loss (3–6, 3–6)	3–1	III	Doubles (with Karolína Plíšková)	United States	Madison Keys; Taylor Townsend
Loss (0–2)	4–1	Nov 2022	F SF	Glasgow, SCO	Hard (i)	Loss (4–6, 4–6)	3–2	I	Singles	Switzerland	Viktorija Golubic
Win (3–1)	5–1	Apr 2023	F QR	Antalya, TUR	Clay	not played	—	V	Doubles (with Linda Nosková)	Ukraine	Lyudmyla Kichenok; Dayana Yastremska
Win (2–0)	6–1	Sep 2026	F QF	Shenzhen, CHI	Hard (i)	not played	—	III	Doubles (with Kateřina Siniaková)	(United Kingdom) Great Britain	Harriet Dart; Jodie Burrage
Win (2–0)	7–1	Sep 2026	F SF	Shenzhen, CHI	Hard (i)	Win (7–5, 6–4)	4–2	I	Singles	Spain	Jéssica Bouzas Maneiro
Win (2–0)	8–1	Sep 2026	F F	Shenzhen, CHI	Hard (i)	Win (6–2, 6–3)	5–2	I	Singles	Ukraine	Anhelina Kalinina

- Key: (WG) world group; (F) finals; (PO) play-offs; (QR) qualifying round.

== WTA Tour career earnings ==
Current as of 28 September 2026.

Year	Grand Slam titles	WTA titles	Total titles	Earnings ($)	Money list rank
2014	–	–	–	3,700	800
2015	–	–	–	7,470	596
2016	–	–	–	26,507	326
2017	–	–	–	19,788	407
2018	–	–	–	197,041	161
2019	–	1	1	1,155,524	36
2020	–	–	–	493,478	42
2021	–	–	–	1,351,039	21
2022	–	–	–	443,949	112
2023	–	–	–	2,804,438	9
2024	–	–	–	1,776,925	23
2025	–	–	–	2,119,265	20
2026	1	2	3	4,749,277	7
Career	1	3	4	15,171,307	46

- Title counts include singles, doubles and mixed doubles titles.

== Career Grand Slam statistics ==
=== Best Grand Slam results details ===
Grand Slam winners are in boldface, and runner–ups are in italics.

**Australian Open**
**2021 Australian Open (25th)**
Round	Opponent	Rank	Score
1R	(Latvia) Jeļena Ostapenko	47	7–5, 6–2
2R	(Germany) Mona Barthel (PR)	212	6–4, 6–1
3R	(Czech Republic) Karolína Plíšková (6)	6	7–5, 7–5
4R	(Belgium) Elise Mertens (18)	16	7–6^{(7–5)}, 7–5
QF	(Australia) Ashleigh Barty (1)	1	1–6, 6–3, 6–2
SF	(United States) Jennifer Brady (22)	24	4–6, 6–3, 4–6

**Wimbledon Championships**
2026 Wimbledon Championships (10th)
Round	Opponent	Rank	Score
1R	Anastasia Zakharova	85	6–3, 6–2
2R	(China) Zhang Shuai	64	6–3, 6–2
3R	(Thailand) Mananchaya Sawangkaew (Q)	164	6–2, 7–6^{(7–1)}
4R	(Czech Republic) Barbora Krejčíková	38	7–5, 5–7, 6–3
QF	(Japan) Naomi Osaka (14)	14	7–6^{(7–4)}, 6–4
SF	(United States) Coco Gauff (7)	7	6–2, 1–6, 7–6^{(12–10)}
F	**(Czech Republic) Linda Nosková (9)**	12	2–6, 7–5, 3–6

**French Open**
**2023 French Open (unseeded)**
Round	Opponent	Rank	Score
1R	(Greece) Maria Sakkari (8)	8	7–6^{(7–5)}, 7–5
2R	(Argentina) Nadia Podoroska	103	6–3, 0–6, 6–3
3R	(Romania) Irina-Camelia Begu (27)	27	6–3, 6–2
4R	Elina Avanesyan (LL)	134	6–4, 6–3
QF	Anastasia Pavlyuchenkova (PR)	333	7–5, 6–2
SF	Aryna Sabalenka (2)	2	7–6^{(7–5)}, 6–7^{(5–7)}, 7–5
F	**(Poland) Iga Świątek (1)**	1	2–6, 7–5, 4–6

**US Open**
**2023 US Open (10th)**
Round	Opponent	Rank	Score
1R	(Australia) Storm Hunter (WC)	158	6–4, 6–0
2R	(Poland) Magdalena Fręch	77	6–3, 6–3
3R	(United States) Taylor Townsend	132	7–6^{(7–0)}, 6–3
4R	(China) Wang Xinyu	53	6–3, 5–7, 6–1
QF	(Romania) Sorana Cîrstea (30)	30	6–0, 6–3
SF	**(United States) Coco Gauff (6)**	6	4–6, 5–7
**2024 US Open (unseeded)**
Round	Opponent	Rank	Score
1R	(United States) Katie Volynets	57	6–3, 7–5
2R	(Japan) Naomi Osaka (WC)	88	6–3, 7–6^{(7–5)}
3R	Anastasia Potapova	38	6–4, 6–2
4R	(Italy) Jasmine Paolini (5)	5	6–3, 6–3
QF	(Brazil) Beatriz Haddad Maia (22)	21	6–1, 6–4
SF	(United States) Jessica Pegula (6)	6	6–1, 4–6, 2–6

=== Grand Slam tournament seedings ===
The tournaments won by Muchová are in boldface, and advanced into finals by Muchová are in italics.

Season	Australian Open	French Open	Wimbledon	US Open
2016	A	A	A	DNQ
2017	A	A	A	A
2018	A	DNQ	DNQ	Q
2019	Q	–	–	–
2020	20th	22nd	cancelled	20th
2021	25th	18th	19th	22nd
2022	A	–	–	PR
2023	PR	– (1)	16th	10th
2024	A	A	–	–
2025	20th	14th	15th	11th
2026	19th	10th	10th (2)	7th

- Key: (A) absent; (Q) qualifier; (DNQ) did not qualify; (RT) retired; (NH) Not Held; (–) unseeded; (LL) lucky looser; (PR) protect ranking.

== Wins against top 10 players ==
- Muchová has a 21–29 (42%) record against players who were, at the time the match was played, ranked in the top 10.

No.	Player	Rk	Event	Surface	Rd	Score	Rk	Years	Ref
1	(Czech Republic) Karolína Plíšková	3	Wimbledon, United Kingdom	Grass	4R	4–6, 7–5, 13–11	68	2019	
2	(Czech Republic) Karolína Plíšková	6	Australian Open, Australia	Hard	3R	7–5, 7–5	27	2021	
3	(Australia) Ashleigh Barty	1	Australian Open, Australia	Hard	QF	1–6, 6–3, 6–2	27	2021	
4	(Japan) Naomi Osaka	2	Madrid Open, Spain	Clay	2R	6–4, 3–6, 6–1	20	2021	
5	(Canada) Bianca Andreescu	8	Cincinnati Open, United States	Hard	2R	6–4, 6–2	23	2021	
6	(Greece) Maria Sakkari	3	French Open, France	Clay	2R	7–6^{(7–5)}, 7–6^{(7–4)}	81	2022	
7	(Switzerland) Belinda Bencic	9	Dubai Championships, UAE	Hard	3R	6–1, 6–4	112	2023	
8	(Greece) Maria Sakkari	8	French Open, France	Clay	1R	7–6^{(7–5)}, 7–5	43	2023	
9	Aryna Sabalenka	2	French Open, France	Clay	SF	7–6^{(7–5)}, 6–7^{(5–7)}, 7–5	43	2023	
10	(Greece) Maria Sakkari	8	Cincinnati Open, United States	Hard	3R	6–3, 2–6, 6–3	17	2023	
11	Aryna Sabalenka	2	Cincinnati Open, United States	Hard	SF	6–7^{(4–7)}, 6–3, 6–2	17	2023	
12	(Italy) Jasmine Paolini	5	US Open, United States	Hard	4R	6–3, 6–3	52	2024	
13	Aryna Sabalenka	2	China Open, China	Hard	QF	7–6^{(7–5)}, 2–6, 6–4	49	2024	
14	(China) Zheng Qinwen	7	China Open, China	Hard	SF	6–3, 6–4	49	2024	
15	(Italy) Jasmine Paolini	4	United Cup, Australia	Hard	QF	6–2, 6–2	22	2025	
16	Ekaterina Alexandrova	10	Brisbane International, Australia	Hard	3R	6–4, 7–5	20	2026	
17	(Kazakhstan) Elena Rybakina	5	Brisbane International, Australia	Hard	QF	6–2, 2–6, 6–4	20	2026	
18	(Canada) Victoria Mboko	9	Miami Open, United States	Hard	QF	7–5, 7–6^{(7–5)}	14	2026	
19	(United States) Coco Gauff	3	Stuttgart Open, Germany	Clay (i)	QF	6–3, 5–7, 6–3	12	2026	
20	(Ukraine) Elina Svitolina	7	Stuttgart Open, Germany	Clay (i)	SF	6–4, 2–6, 6–4	12	2026	
21	(United States) Coco Gauff	7	Wimbledon, United Kingdom	Grass	SF	6–2, 1–6, 7–6^{(12–10)}	9	2026	

- Key: (Rk) first use, opponent rank; (Rd) round; (Rk) 2nd use, player rank; (Ref) reference; (F) final; (SF) semifinal; (QF) quarterfinal; (#R) rounds 4, 3, 2, 1; (RR) round-robin stage; (Q#) qualifying rounds or stages (3), 2, 1.

== Longest winning streaks ==
=== 10–match singles winning streak (2026) ===
#	Tournament	Tier	Start date	Surface	Rd	Opponent	Rank	Score
–	German Open	WTA 500	15 June 2026	Grass	2R	(United States) Madison Keys	28	4–6, 5–7
1	Bad Homburg Open	WTA 500	21 June 2026	Grass	2R	(Romania) Irina-Camelia Begu (Q)	211	6–1, 6–1
2	Bad Homburg Open	WTA 500	21 June 2026	Grass	QF	(Denmark) Clara Tauson	25	1–6, 6–2, 6–4
3	Bad Homburg Open	WTA 500	21 June 2026	Grass	SF	(Romania) Elena-Gabriela Ruse (Q)	105	6–4, 6–4
4	Bad Homburg Open	WTA 500	21 June 2026	Grass	F	(Japan) Naomi Osaka (6)	15	6–1, 1–0, ret.
5	Wimbledon	Grand Slam	29 June 2026	Grass	1R	Anastasia Zakharova	85	6–3, 6–2
6	Wimbledon	Grand Slam	29 June 2026	Grass	2R	(China) Zhang Shuai	64	6–3, 6–2
7	Wimbledon	Grand Slam	29 June 2026	Grass	3R	(Thailand) Mananchaya Sawangkaew (Q)	164	6–2, 7–6^{(7–1)}
8	Wimbledon	Grand Slam	29 June 2026	Grass	4R	(Czech Republic) Barbora Krejčíková	38	7–5, 5–7, 6–3
9	Wimbledon	Grand Slam	29 June 2026	Grass	QF	(Japan) Naomi Osaka (14)	14	7–6^{(7–4)}, 6–4
10	Wimbledon	Grand Slam	29 June 2026	Grass	SF	(United States) Coco Gauff (7)	7	6–2, 1–6, 7–6^{(12–10)}
–	Wimbledon	Grand Slam	29 June 2026	Grass	F	(Czech Republic) Linda Nosková (9)	12	2–6, 7–5, 3–6

== Honors and awards ==
Award	Year	Category	Result	Ref.
Billie Jean King Cup Awards	2026	All-Star Team (Finals)	Won	
