= 2016 Bredeney Ladies Open – Doubles =

Doubles
- 2016 Bredeney Ladies Open

Final
- Champions: (Spain) Laura Pous Tió (Germany) Anne Schäfer
- Runners-up: (Belgium) Elyne Boeykens (Romania) Elena Ruse
- Score: 6–2, 6–3

Events
Singles	Doubles
← 2015 ·	Bredeney Ladies Open	· 2017 →

Nicola Geuer and Viktorija Golubic were the defending champions, but Golubic chose to participate at the 2016 Ricoh Open instead. Geuer partnered Anna Zaja, but withdrew prior to their semifinal match.

Laura Pous Tió and Anne Schäfer won the title, defeating Elyne Boeykens and Elena Ruse in the final, 6–2, 6–3.

== Seeds ==
1. (Germany) Carolin Daniels / (Germany) Antonia Lottner (first round)
2. (Argentina) Tatiana Búa / (Ukraine) Alona Fomina (first round)
3. (Spain) Laura Pous Tió / (Germany) Anne Schäfer (champions)
4. (Uzbekistan) Akgul Amanmuradova / (Russia) Valentyna Ivakhnenko (first round, withdrew)

== Draw ==
=== Key ===
- Q = Qualifier
- WC = Wild card
- LL = Lucky loser
- Alt = Alternate
- SE = Special exempt
- PR = Protected ranking
- ITF = ITF entry
- JE = Junior exempt
- w/o = Walkover
- r = Retired
- d = Defaulted
- SR = Special ranking

First round
1	(Germany) C Daniels (Germany) A Lottner	4	3
(Germany) N Geuer (Germany) A Zaja	6	6
(Netherlands) C Burger (Netherlands) E Wacanno	6	6
WC	(Germany) J Kimmelmann (Germany) C Witthöft	2	4
3	(Spain) L Pous Tió (Germany) A Schäfer	6	6
Q	(Germany) T Morderger (Germany) Y Morderger	4	2
(Georgia (country)) E Gorgodze (Georgia (country)) S Kvatsabaia	5	6	[10]
(Israel) D Khazaniuk (Georgia (country)) S Shapatava	7	4	[6]
LL	(Germany) L Hohnhold (Germany) J Mikulski	1	6	[3]
WC	(Netherlands) D Karregat (Germany) D Kremer	6	4	[10]
Q	(Italy) C Ferrando (Slovenia) D Jakupović	w/o
4	(Uzbekistan) A Amanmuradova (Russia) V Ivakhnenko
WC	(Germany) K Gerlach (Germany) L Rüffer	6	6^{2}	[10]
(Germany) A Klasen (Austria) S Klemenschits	3	7^{7}	[1]
(Belgium) E Boeykens (Romania) E Ruse	6	4	[10]
2	(Argentina) T Búa (Ukraine) A Fomina	1	6	[8]

Quarterfinals
(Germany) N Geuer (Germany) A Zaja	7^{7}	6
(Netherlands) C Burger (Netherlands) E Wacanno	6^{3}	4
3	(Spain) L Pous Tió (Germany) A Schäfer	6	6^{12}	[10]
(Georgia (country)) E Gorgodze (Georgia (country)) S Kvatsabaia	3	7^{14}	[1]
WC	(Netherlands) D Karregat (Germany) D Kremer	3	6	[9]
Q	(Italy) C Ferrando (Slovenia) D Jakupović	6	2	[11]
WC	(Germany) K Gerlach (Germany) L Rüffer	2	6	[3]
(Belgium) E Boeykens (Romania) E Ruse	6	3	[10]

Semifinals
(Germany) N Geuer (Germany) A Zaja
3	(Spain) L Pous Tió (Germany) A Schäfer	w/o
Q	(Italy) C Ferrando (Slovenia) D Jakupović	4	6	[8]
(Belgium) E Boeykens (Romania) E Ruse	6	0	[10]

Final
3	(Spain) L Pous Tió (Germany) A Schäfer	6	6
(Belgium) E Boeykens (Romania) E Ruse	2	3
