= 2016 Bredeney Ladies Open – Singles =

Singles
- 2016 Bredeney Ladies Open

Final
- Champion: (Spain) Sara Sorribes Tormo
- Runner-up: (Czech Republic) Karolína Muchová
- Score: 7–6^{(7–5)}, 6–4

Events
Singles	Doubles
← 2015 ·	Bredeney Ladies Open	· 2017 →

Pauline Parmentier was the defending champion, but chose not to participate.

Sara Sorribes Tormo won the title, defeating Karolína Muchová in the final, 7–6^{(7–5)}, 6–4.

== Seeds ==
1. (Belarus) Aliaksandra Sasnovich (first round)
2. (Germany) Carina Witthöft (quarterfinals)
3. (Spain) Lourdes Domínguez Lino (first round)
4. (Greece) Maria Sakkari (quarterfinals)
5. (Slovakia) Jana Čepelová (semifinals)
6. (Switzerland) Romina Oprandi (second round)
7. (Bulgaria) ~~Sesil Karatantcheva~~ (withdrew)
8. (Netherlands) Cindy Burger (semifinals)

== Main draw ==
=== Key ===
- Q = Qualifier
- WC = Wild card
- LL = Lucky loser
- Alt = Alternate
- SE = Special exempt
- PR = Protected ranking
- ITF = ITF entry
- JE = Junior exempt
- w/o = Walkover
- r = Retired
- d = Defaulted
- SR = Special ranking

=== Finals ===
Semifinals
(Spain) Sara Sorribes Tormo	7	6
8	(Netherlands) Cindy Burger	5	3
5	(Slovakia) Jana Čepelová	6	2	2
(Czech Republic) Karolína Muchová	4	6	6

Final
(Spain) Sara Sorribes Tormo	7^{7}	6
(Czech Republic) Karolína Muchová	6^{5}	4

=== Top half ===
First round
1	(Belarus) A Sasnovich	6	2	2
(Romania) E Ruse	3	6	6
(Russia) V Ivakhnenko	1^{r}
Q	(Spain) O Sáez Larra	2
(Spain) S Sorribes Tormo	3	6	6
WC	(Norway) M Stokke	6	3	1
Q	(Uzbekistan) A Amanmuradova	1	0
6	(Switzerland) R Oprandi	6	6
4	(Greece) M Sakkari	6	6
WC	(Germany) D Kremer	2	3
(Slovenia) D Jakupović	6	6
LL	(Germany) T Morderger	3	2
(Germany) A Lottner	6	6
Q	(Austria) P König	1	3
WC	(Russia) K Kislyak	1	2
8	(Netherlands) C Burger	6	6

Second round
(Romania) E Ruse	2	4
Q	(Spain) O Sáez Larra	6	6
(Spain) S Sorribes Tormo	6	1
6	(Switzerland) R Oprandi	3	0^{r}
4	(Greece) M Sakkari	6	6
(Slovenia) D Jakupović	3	0
(Germany) A Lottner	1	5
8	(Netherlands) C Burger	6	7

Quarterfinals
Q	(Spain) O Sáez Larra	0	1
(Spain) S Sorribes Tormo	6	6
4	(Greece) M Sakkari	2	5
8	(Netherlands) C Burger	6	7

Semifinals
(Spain) S Sorribes Tormo	7	6
8	(Netherlands) C Burger	5	3

=== Bottom half ===
First round
5	(Slovakia) J Čepelová	2	7^{8}	7
(Japan) M Eguchi	6	6^{6}	5
LL	(Denmark) K Barritza	3	6	2
(Spain) L Pous Tió	6	0	6
(Italy) N Burnett	2	6	2
(Germany) A Schäfer	6	4	6
(Germany) T Korpatsch	6	6
3	(Spain) L Domínguez Lino	2	3
LL	(Germany) Y Morderger	2	2
Q	(Germany) A Zaja	6	6
(Georgia (country)) S Shapatava	6	3	3
(Czech Republic) K Muchová	3	6	6
(Israel) D Khazaniuk	6	4	2
(Belgium) E Boeykens	2	6	6
WC	(Germany) J Kimmelmann	1	1
2	(Germany) C Witthöft	6	6

Second round
5	(Slovakia) J Čepelová	6	6
(Spain) L Pous Tió	2	0
(Germany) A Schäfer	6	6
(Germany) T Korpatsch	4	3
Q	(Germany) A Zaja	2	2
(Czech Republic) K Muchová	6	6
(Belgium) E Boeykens	4	2
2	(Germany) C Witthöft	6	6

Quarterfinals
5	(Slovakia) J Čepelová	6	7
(Germany) A Schäfer	2	5
(Czech Republic) K Muchová	3	6	6
2	(Germany) C Witthöft	6	3	3

Semifinals
5	(Slovakia) J Čepelová	6	2	2
(Czech Republic) K Muchová	4	6	6
