= 2016 ITF Men's Circuit =

Details
- Duration: 4 January 2016 – 1 January 2017
- Edition: 19th
- Tournaments: 646
- Categories: $25,000 tournaments (106) $10,000 tournaments (540)

Achievements (singles)
- Most titles: (Italy) Riccardo Bellotti (9)

The 2016 ITF Men's Circuit is the 2016 edition of the second-tier tour for men's professional tennis. It is organised by the International Tennis Federation and is a tier below the ATP Tour. The ITF Men's Circuit includes tournaments with prize money ranging from $10,000 up to $25,000.

== Participating host nations ==
- Algeria (ALG)
- Argentina (ARG)
- Australia (AUS)
- Austria (AUT)
- Azerbaijan (AZE)
- Bahrain (BHR)
- Belarus (BLR)
- Belgium (BEL)
- Bolivia (BOL)
- Bosnia and Herzegovina (BIH)
- Brazil (BRA)
- Bulgaria (BUL)
- Canada (CAN)
- China (CHN)
- Chinese Taipei (TPE)
- Colombia (COL)
- Costa Rica (CRC)
- Croatia (CRO)
- Cyprus (CYP)
- Czech Republic (CZE)
- Dominican Republic (DOM)
- Ecuador (ECU)
- Egypt (EGY)
- El Salvador (SLV)
- Estonia (EST)
- Finland (FIN)
- France (FRA)
- Georgia (GEO)
- Germany (GER)
- Great Britain (GBR)
- Greece (GRE)
- Guam (GUM)
- Hong Kong (HKG)
- Hungary (HUN)
- India (IND)
- Indonesia (INA)
- Israel (ISR)
- Italy (ITA)
- Japan (JPN)
- Kazakhstan (KAZ)
- Kuwait (KUW)
- Latvia (LAT)
- Lithuania (LTU)
- North Macedonia (MKD)
- Mexico (MEX)
- Morocco (MAR)
- Mozambique (MOZ)
- Netherlands (NED)
- Nigeria (NGR)
- Norway (NOR)
- Poland (POL)
- Portugal (POR)
- Puerto Rico (PUR)
- Qatar (QAT)
- Romania (ROM)
- Russia (RUS)
- South Africa (RSA)
- South Korea (KOR)
- Spain (ESP)
- Serbia (SRB)
- Slovakia (SVK)
- Sweden (SWE)
- Switzerland (SUI)
- Thailand (THA)
- Tunisia (TUN)
- Turkey (TUR)
- Ukraine (UKR)
- United States (USA)
- Uruguay (URU)
- Uzbekistan (UZB)
- Vietnam (VIE)
- Zimbabwe (ZIM)

Countries that are hosting a tournament in 2016, but did not in 2015.

- Azerbaijan (AZE)
- Costa Rica (CRC)
- Croatia (CRO)
- Ecuador (ECU)
- Hungary (HUN)
- North Macedonia (MKD)
- Puerto Rico (PUR)
- Slovakia (SVK)
- Uruguay (URU)
- Vietnam (VIE)

== Schedule ==
=== Key ===
$25,000 tournaments
$10,000 tournaments

=== January–March ===
No.	January				February					March			
No.	4	11	18	25	1	8	15	22	29	7	14	21	28
1	USA F1	USA F2	KAZ F1	GER F3	AZE F2	SUI F1	SUI F2	AUS F1	AUS F2	CAN F2	AUS F3	AUS F4	BHR F1
2	TUR F1	FRA F1	EGY F1	KAZ F2	EGY F3	AZE F3	CHN F1	CHN F2	CAN F1	ARG F2	FRA F6	USA F11	EGY F11
3		GER F1	FRA F2	AZE F1	GBR F1	EGY F4	EGY F5	EGY F6	FRA F4	AZE F4	USA F10	ARG F4	GRE F2
4		TUN F1	GER F2	EGY F2	ESP F2	GBR F2	GBR F3	ISR F3	CHN F3	CRO F2	ARG F3	AZE F6	JPN F4
5		TUR F2	TUN F2	FRA F3	TUN F4	ISR F1	ISR F2	POR F1	CRO F1	EGY F8	AZE F5	CRO F4	ESP F7
6		USA F3	TUR F3	ESP F1	TUR F5	ESP F3	ESP F4	ESP F5	EGY F7	FRA F5	CRO F3	EGY F10	TUN F12
7			USA F4	TUN F3	USA F6	TUN F5	TUN F6	TUN F7	ITA F1	ISR F4	EGY F9	FRA F7	TUR F13
8				TUR F4		TUR F6	TUR F7	TUR F8	POR F2	ITA F2	ISR F5	GRE F1	
9				USA F5			USA F7	USA F8	ESP F6	JPN F1	ITA F3	ISR F6	
10									TUN F8	MAR F1	JPN F2	ITA F4	
11									TUR F9	POR F3	MAR F2	JPN F3	
12									USA F9	TUN F9	TUN F10	MAR F3	
13										TUR F10	TUR F11	TUN F11	
14												TUR F12	

=== April–June ===
No.	April				May					June			
No.	4	11	18	25	2	9	16	23	30	6	13	20	27
1	CHN F4	CHN F5	FRA F8	FRA F9	NGR F3	NGR F4	CHN F7	CHN F8	CHN F9	ESP F16	KOR F1	CAN F3	CAN F4
2	USA F12	USA F13	KAZ F3	KAZ F4	ARG F5	ALG F1	ALG F2	ROM F4	JPN F6	USA F17	USA F18	FRA F11	CHN F10
3	UZB F1	UZB F2	NGR F1	NGR F2	CRO F5	ARG F6	ARG F7	UZB F3	UZB F4	BUL F4	BEL F1	NED F2	CZE F4
4	EGY F12	GRE F4	GRE F5	GRE F6	HUN F3	BIH F1	BIH F2	ALG F3	ARG F9	HKG F1	COL F1	ESP F18	FRA F12
5	GRE F3	ITA F6	HUN F1	HUN F2	IND F2	CHN F6	BUL F1	ARG F8	BIH F4	ISR F10	FRA F10	USA F21	USA F23
6	ITA F4	QAT F2	ITA F7	IND F1	ITA F9	CRO F6	CRO F7	BIH F3	BUL F3	ITA F14	HKG F2	BEL F2	BEL F3
7	JPN F5	ESP F9	QAT F3	ITA F8	MEX F1	CZE F1	CZE F2	BUL F2	ISR F9	JPN F7	ITA F15	COL F2	BRA F1
8	QAT F1	TUN F14	ESP F10	ESP F11	POR F4	IND F3	ISR F7	CZE F3	ITA F13	MOZ F1	JPN F8	MKD F1	COL F3
9	ESP F8	TUR F15	TUN F15	TUN F16	ROM F1	ITA F10	ITA F11	GUM F1	MEX F5	POL F3	MOZ F2	GER F4	EGY F13
10	TUN F13		TUR F16	TUR F17	ESP F12	MEX F2	MEX F3	ISR F8	POL F2	ROM F5	NED F1	HKG F3	MKD F2
11	TUR F14		USA F14	USA F15	SWE F1	POR F5	POR F6	ITA F12	TUN F21	TUR F23	POL F4	ITA F16	GER F5
12					TUN F17	ROM F2	ROM F3	MEX F4	TUR F22		ROM F6	KOR F2	ITA F18
13					TUR F18	ESP F13	ESP F14	POR F7			ESP F17	ROM F7	KOR F3
14					USA F16	SWE F2	SWE F3	ESP F15			TUR F24	RUS F1	NED F3
15						TUN F18	TUN F19	TUN F20			USA F19	TUR F25	ROM F8
16						TUR F19	TUR F20	TUR F21				USA F20	RUS F2
17						UKR F1	UKR F2	UKR F3				ZIM F1	ESP F19
18													TUR F26
19													USA F22
20													ZIM F2

=== July–September ===
No.	July				August					September			
No.	4	11	18	25	1	8	15	22	29	5	12	19	26
1	CAN F5	AUT F2	FRA F15	FRA F16	ITA F23	ITA F24	ITA F25	POL F6	CAN F6	BEL F13	CAN F8	AUS F5	AUS F6
2	FRA F13	BEL F5	GER F8	USA F25	USA F26	ROM F12	POL F5	AUT F7	RUS F7	CAN F7	FRA F18	CAN F9	HUN F7
3	ITA F19	BRA F3	USA F24	AUT F4	BEL F8	USA F27	AUT F6	BLR F3	AUT F8	FRA F17	SRB F7	FRA F19	ISR F14
4	NED F4	CHN F12	AUT F3	BEL F7	EGY F18	AUT F5	BLR F2	BEL F11	BEL F12	RUS F8	BEL F14	ESP F31	POR F11
5	AUT F1	CZE F6	BEL F6	EGY F17	FIN F1	BLR F1	BEL F10	EGY F21	EGY F22	ESP F29	EGY F24	EGY F25	SWE F4
6	BEL F4	EGY F15	BRA F4	EST F1	GEO F2	BEL F9	EGY F20	GER F12	INA F3	EGY F23	HUN F5	HUN F6	CRO F8
7	BRA F2	FRA F14	CHN F13	GEO F1	GER F9	EGY F19	FIN F3	INA F2	ITA F27	HUN F4	IND F5	IND F6	EGY F26
8	CHN F11	GER F7	EGY F16	ITA F22	LAT F1	FIN F2	GER F11	ITA F26	KOR F7	IND F4	ISR F12	ISR F13	FRA F20
9	CZE F5	ITA F20	ITA F21	MAR F4	MAR F5	GEO F3	INA F1	KOR F6	NED F7	ISR F11	ITA F29	ITA F30	ITA F31
10	EGY F14	KOR F5	LTU F1	POR F10	ROM F11	GER F10	NED F5	ROM F14	ROM F15	ITA F28	ESP F30	KAZ F5	KAZ F6
11	MKD F3	POR F8	POR F9	ROM F10	RUS F4	MAR F6	ROM F13	ESP F27	ESP F28	KOR F8	TUN F23	SRB F8	ESP F32
12	GER F6	ESP F21	ROM F9	SRB F2	SRB F3	RUS F5	RUS F6	SUI F4	SUI F5	ROM F16	USA F28	TUN F24	TUN F25
13	KOR F4	TUR F28	SRB F1	SVK F1	SVK F2	SRB F4	SRB F5	THA F1	THA F2	SRB F6	VIE F4	UKR F4	UKR F5
14	RUS F3		ESP F22	ESP F23	ESP F24	SVK F3	SVK F4			THA F3		USA F29	USA F30
15	ESP F20			VIE F1	VIE F2	ESP F25	ESP F26			TUN F22		VIE F5	VIE F6
16	TUR F27												
17	ZIM F3												

=== October–December ===
No.	October					November				December			
No.	3	10	17	24	31	7	14	21	28	5	12	19	26
1	AUS F7	AUS F8	FRA F23	USA F34	ARG F12	AUS F9	AUS F10	BOL F3	USA F39	USA F40	CHI F7	CHI F8	HKG F5
2	FRA F21	NGR F5	NGR F6	ARG F11	EGY F31	ARG F13	FIN F4	COL F8	CHI F5	CHI F6	DOM F3	HKG F4	THA F6
3	HUN F8	USA F31	USA F32	TPE F3	EST F3	BOL F1	BOL F2	CYP F2	COL F9	CZE F12	EGY F37	PUR F1	
4	POR F12	TPE F1	USA F33	CZE F9	GER F17	CRC F1	COL F7	CZE F10	CYP F3	DOM F2	INA F6	THA F5	
5	SWE F5	COL F5	TPE F2	ECU F3	GBR F5	EGY F32	CYP F1	EGY F34	CZE F11	EGY F36	ISR F18	TUR F51	
6	COL F4	CRO F10	COL F6	EGY F30	GRE F8	EST F4	EGY F33	SLV F2	DOM F1	INA F5	QAT F6		
7	CRO F9	CZE F7	CRO F11	EST F2	ITA F36	GBR F6	SLV F1	GRE F11	EGY F35	ISR F17	THA F4		
8	EGY F27	ECU F1	CZE F8	GER F16	KUW F1	GRE F9	GRE F10	ESP F38	INA F4	QAT F5	TUN F36		
9	GER F13	EGY F28	ECU F2	GBR F4	MAR F7	ITA F37	KUW F3	TUN F33	ISR F16	TUN F35	TUR F50		
10	ISR F15	FRA F22	EGY F29	GRE F7	NOR F3	KUW F2	MAR F9	TUR F47	QAT F4	TUR F49	URU F3		
11	ITA F32	GER F14	GER F15	ITA F35	RSA F1	MAR F8	RSA F3		ESP F39	URU F2			
12	KAZ F7	ITA F33	ITA F34	NOR F2	TUN F30	RSA F2	ESP F37		TUN F34				
13	TUN F26	ESP F33	NOR F1	ESP F35	TUR F44	ESP F36	TUN F32		TUR F48				
14	UKR F6	TUN F27	ESP F34	TUN F29	USA F35	TUN F31	TUR F46		URU F1				
15		TUR F41	TUN F28	TUR F43	VIE F9	TUR F45	USA F37						
16			TUR F42	VIE F8		USA F36							
17			VIE F7										

== Point distribution ==
Tournament Category	W	F	SF	QF	R16	R32
Futures 25,000+H	35	20	10	4	1	0
Futures 25,000	27	15	8	3	1	0
Futures 10,000	18	10	6	2	1	0

== See also ==
- 2016 ATP World Tour
- 2016 ATP Challenger Tour
- 2016 ITF Women's Circuit
