= Bredeney Ladies Open =

Women's World Tennis Tour
- Location: Essen, Germany
- Venue: Tennisclub Bredeney
- Category: ITF Women's Circuit
- Surface: Clay
- Draw: 32S/32Q/16D
- Prize money: $25,000 (€21,136)
- Website: Official website

The Bredeney Ladies Open is a tournament for professional female tennis players on outdoor clay courts. The event is classified as a $25,000 (€21,136) ITF Women's Circuit tournament and has been held in Essen, Germany, since 2013.

== Past finals ==
=== Singles ===
Year	Champion	Runner-up	Score
2019	(Czech Republic) Tereza Martincová	(Spain) Paula Badosa	6–2, 7–6^{(7–4)}
2018	(Luxembourg) Mandy Minella	(Netherlands) Cindy Burger	7–5, 4–6, 6–4
2017	(Estonia) Kaia Kanepi	(Switzerland) Patty Schnyder	6–3, 6–7^{(5–7)}, 2–0 ret.
2016	(Spain) Sara Sorribes Tormo	(Czech Republic) Karolína Muchová	7–6^{(7–5)}, 6–4
2015	(France) Pauline Parmentier	(Switzerland) Viktorija Golubic	3–6, 7–6^{(7–4)}, 6–3
2014	(Luxembourg) Mandy Minella	(Netherlands) Richèl Hogenkamp	6–2, 4–6, 6–3
2013	(Slovakia) Michaela Hončová	(Slovakia) Chantal Škamlová	6–2, 6–2

=== Doubles ===
Year	Champions	Runners-up	Score
2019	(North Macedonia) Lina Gjorcheska (Russia) Anastasiya Komardina	(Russia) Alena Fomina (Czech Republic) Anastasia Zarycká	6–3, 6–3
2018	(Germany) Katharina Gerlach (Germany) Julia Wachaczyk	(Latvia) Diāna Marcinkēviča (South Africa) Chanel Simmonds	6–4, 2–6, [10–6]
2017	(Germany) Carolin Daniels (Belarus) Lidziya Marozava	(Bosnia and Herzegovina) Anita Husarić (Belgium) Kimberley Zimmermann	6–1, 6–4
2016	(Spain) Laura Pous Tió (Germany) Anne Schäfer	(Belgium) Elyne Boeykens (Romania) Elena-Gabriela Ruse	6–2, 6–3
2015	(Germany) Nicola Geuer (Switzerland) Viktorija Golubic	(Germany) Carolin Daniels (Germany) Antonia Lottner	6–3, 6–3
2014	(Germany) Kristina Barrois (Germany) Tatjana Maria	(Belgium) Ysaline Bonaventure (Bulgaria) Elitsa Kostova	6–2, 6–2
2013	(Russia) Eugeniya Pashkova (Ukraine) Anastasiya Vasylyeva	(France) Irina Ramialison (France) Constance Sibille	7–5, 6–4
