= Anne Schäfer =

German tennis player

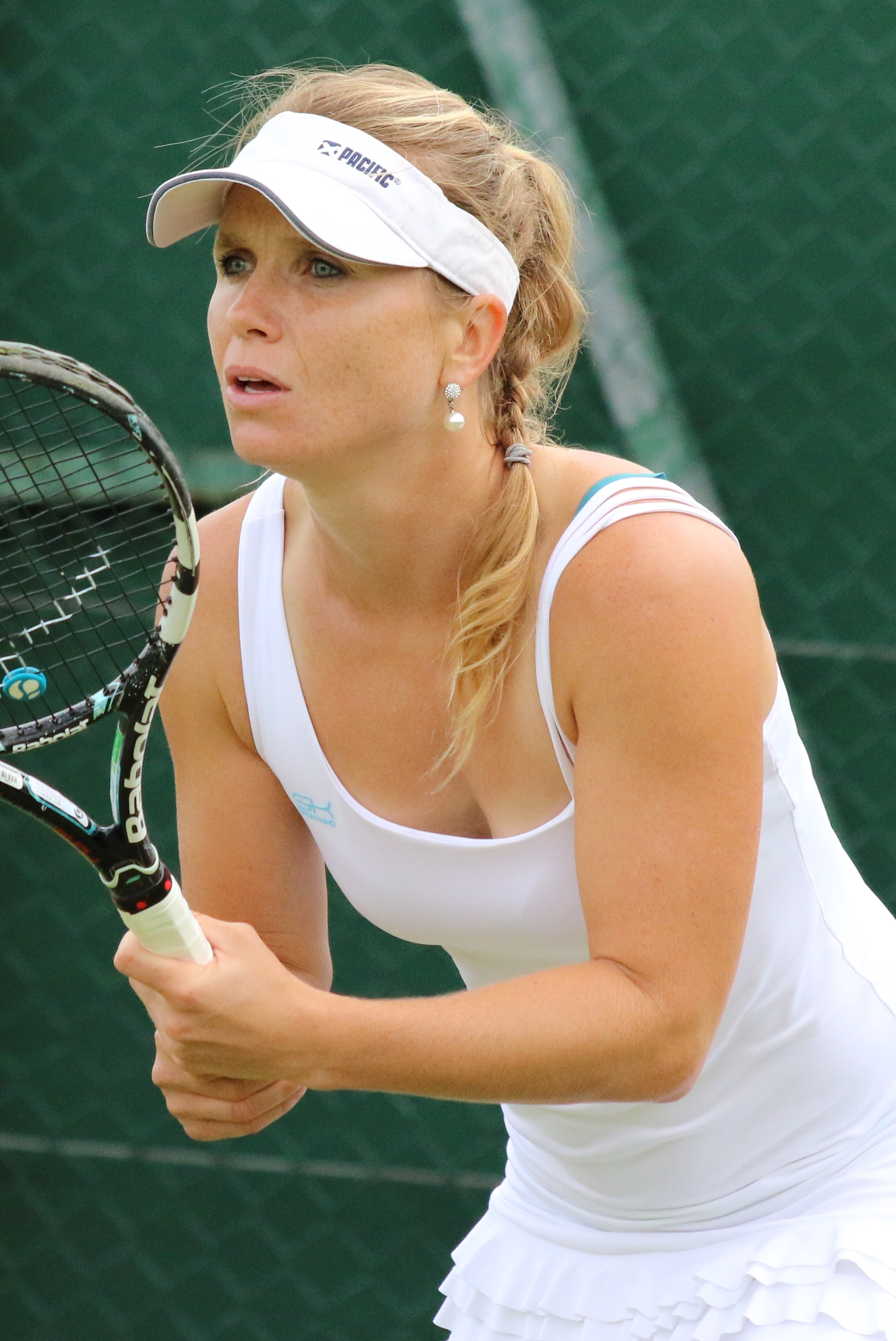
- Schäfer at the 2016 Wimbledon qualifying tournament
- ITF name: Anne Schaefer
- Country (sports): Germany
- Born: 1 March 1987 (age 39) Apolda, East Germany (now Germany)
- Height: 1.67 m (5 ft 6 in)
- Turned pro: 2005
- Plays: Right-handed (two-handed backhand)
- Prize money: $250,263

Singles
- Career record: 547–299
- Career titles: 22 ITF
- Highest ranking: No. 161 (23 March 2009)
- Current ranking: No. 1027 (12 October 2026)

Grand Slam singles results
- Australian Open: Q2 (2009)
- French Open: Q1 (2009, 2016)
- Wimbledon: Q1 (2009, 2013, 2016)
- US Open: Q2 (2008)

Doubles
- Career record: 138–137
- Career titles: 9 ITF
- Highest ranking: No. 211 (25 July 2016)
- Current ranking: No. 1423 (12 October 2026)
- Last updated on: 15 October 2026.

Anne Schäfer (German pronunciation: [ˈʔanə ˈʃɛːfɐ]; born 1 March 1987) is a German tennis player.

Schäfer has won twenty-one singles and nine doubles titles on the ITF Women's Circuit in her career. On 23 March 2009, she reached her best singles ranking of world No. 161. On 25 July 2016, she peaked at No. 211 in the WTA doubles rankings.

Schäfer made her WTA Tour main-draw singles debut at the 2016 Copa Colsanitas, when she defeated qualifier Chloé Paquet in the first round.

== Education ==
Schäfer completed her Abitur in Thuringia, and studied economics at the University of Hagen.

== Singles performance timeline ==
Key
W	F	SF	QF	#R	RR	Q#	DNQ	A	NH

(W) winner; (F) finalist; (SF) semifinalist; (QF) quarterfinalist; (#R) rounds 4, 3, 2, 1; (RR) round-robin stage; (Q#) qualification round; (DNQ) did not qualify; (A) absent; (NH) not held; (SR) strike rate (events won / competed); (W–L) win–loss record.
To avoid confusion and double counting, these charts are updated at the conclusion of a tournament or when the player's participation has ended.

Only main-draw results in WTA Tour and Grand Slam tournaments are included in win–loss records.

Tournament	2008	2009	2010	2011	2012	2013	2014	2015	2016	2017	2018	W–L
Grand Slam tournaments
Australian Open	A	A	A	Q2	A	A	A	A	A	A	A	0–0
French Open	A	Q1	A	A	A	A	A	A	Q1	A	A	0–0
Wimbledon	A	Q1	A	A	A	Q1	A	A	Q1	A	A	0–0
US Open	Q2	A	A	A	A	Q1	A	A	A	A	Q1	0–0
Career statistics
Overall win–loss	0–0	0–0	0–0	0–0	0–0	0–0	0–0	0–0	1–1	0–0	0–0	1–1
Year-end ranking	181	362	404	326	257	229	420	222	241	–	615	

== ITF Circuit finals ==
=== Singles: 46 (22–24) ===
Legend $25,000 tournaments (2–6) $10/15,000 tournaments (20–18)	Finals by surface Hard (0–1) Clay (22–23)

Result	W–L	Date	Tournament	Tier	Surface	Opponent	Score
Loss	0–1	May 2006	ITF Falkenberg, Sweden	10,000	Clay	(Sweden) Johanna Larsson	2–6, 6–7^{(5–7)}
Win	1–1	Jun 2006	ITF Getxo, Spain	10,000	Clay	(Spain) Irene Rehberger Bescos	6–3, 3–6, 6–0
Win	2–1	Jul 2006	ITF Birkerød, Denmark	10,000	Clay	(Finland) Piia Suomalainen	6–4, 6–2
Win	3–1	Aug 2006	ITF Gdynia, Poland	10,000	Clay	(Ukraine) Oksana Teplyakova	6–3, 7–5
Win	4–1	Aug 2006	ITF Kędzierzyn-Koźle, Poland	10,000	Clay	(Czech Republic) Kateřina Vaňková	7–6^{(7–2)}, 7–5
Win	5–1	Oct 2006	ITF Sofia, Bulgaria	10,000	Clay	(Bulgaria) Tanya Germanlieva	6–2, 6–7^{(3–7)}, 6–4
Loss	5–2	Jan 2007	ITF Stuttgart, Germany	10,000	Hard (i)	(Czech Republic) Petra Kvitová	1–6, 0–6
Loss	5–3	Mar 2007	ITF Rome, Italy	10,000	Clay	(Belarus) Darya Kustova	1–6, 4–6
Loss	5–4	Mar 2007	ITF Falkenberg, Sweden	10,000	Clay	(Belarus) Ksenia Milevskaya	4–6, 4–6
Loss	5–5	Aug 2007	ITF Vlaardingen, Netherlands	10,000	Clay	(Netherlands) Arantxa Rus	7–6^{(7–5)}, 2–6, 2–6
Loss	5–6	Oct 2007	ITF Castel Gandolfo, Italy	10,000	Clay	(Slovakia) Michaela Pochabová	1–6, 6–4, 4–6
Loss	5–7	Jun 2008	ITF Campobasso, Italy	25,000	Clay	(Slovenia) Maša Zec Peškirič	3–6, 3–6
Loss	5–8	Jun 2008	ITF Kristinehamn, Sweden	25,000	Clay	(Romania) Simona Halep	3–6, 2–6
Loss	5–9	Jun 2008	ITF Båstad, Sweden	25,000	Clay	(Slovakia) Klaudia Boczová	6–1, 2–6, 2–6
Loss	5–10	Oct 2008	ITF Reggio Calabria, Italy	25,000	Clay	(Austria) Patricia Mayr	1–6, 1–6
Win	6–10	May 2010	ITF Galatina, Italy	10,000	Clay	(Switzerland) Lara Michel	4–6, 6–3, 6–1
Win	7–10	Oct 2010	ITF Cagliari, Italy	10,000	Clay	(Italy) Francesca Mazzali	6–2, 6–2
Win	8–10	Mar 2011	ITF Gonesse, France	10,000	Clay (i)	(Italy) Anastasia Grymalska	7–5, 6–1
Loss	8–11	May 2011	ITF Casarano, Italy	10,000	Clay	(Russia) Irina Khromacheva	3–6, 4–6
Win	9–11	Jul 2011	ITF Gardone Val Trompia, Italy	10,000	Clay	(Italy) Martina Caregaro	7–6^{(7–0)}, 0–6, 6–4
Win	10–11	Oct 2011	ITF Settimo San Pietro, Italy	10,000	Clay	(Italy) Federica di Sarra	3–6, 6–3, 7–6^{(7–3)}
Loss	10–12	Oct 2011	ITF Cagliari, Italy	10,000	Clay	(Belarus) Aliaksandra Sasnovich	4–6, 3–6
Loss	10–13	Jul 2012	ITF Rovereto, Italy	10,000	Clay	(Switzerland) Timea Bacsinszky	0–6, 2–6
Loss	10–14	Aug 2012	ITF Monteroni d'Arbia, Italy	25,000	Clay	(France) Estelle Guisard	3–6, 1–6
Win	11–14	Sep 2012	ITF Dobrich, Bulgaria	25,000	Clay	(Netherlands) Angelique van der Meet	6–2, 6–2
Win	12–14	Mar 2013	ITF Gonesse, France	10,000	Clay (i)	(Czech Republic) Kateřina Vaňková	6–1, 2–1 ret.
Loss	12–15	Aug 2013	ITF Bagnatica, Italy	10,000	Clay	(Italy) Gioia Barbieri	3–6, 6–3, 1–6
Loss	12–16	Mar 2014	ITF Gonesse, France	10,000	Clay (i)	(Italy) Anna Remondina	5–7, 6–7^{(6–8)}
Win	13–16	Nov 2014	ITF Pula, Italy	10,000	Clay	(Italy) Claudia Giovine	6–0, 6–3
Win	14–16	Jan 2015	ITF Antalya, Turkey	10,000	Clay	(Netherlands) Elke Tiel	4–0 ret.
Loss	14–17	Jan 2015	ITF Antalya, Turkey	10,000	Clay	(Slovakia) Petra Uberalová	4–6, 6–7^{(2–7)}
Win	15–17	Feb 2015	ITF Antalya, Turkey	10,000	Clay	(Georgia (country)) Sofia Kvatsabaia	6–2, 6–0
Loss	15–18	Feb 2015	ITF Antalya, Turkey	10,000	Clay	(Russia) Victoria Kan	3–6, 4–6
Loss	15–19	Mar 2015	ITF Antalya, Turkey	10,000	Clay	(Russia) Victoria Kan	1–6, 0–6
Win	16–19	Apr 2015	ITF Pula, Italy	25,000	Clay	(France) Alizé Lim	6–4, 6–3
Win	17–19	Aug 2015	ITF Bagnatica, Italy	10,000	Clay	(Slovenia) Tamara Zidanšek	2–6, 6–1, 6–2
Win	18–19	Oct 2015	ITF Pula, Italy	10,000	Clay	(Italy) Camilla Rosatello	6–1, 6–3
Loss	18–20	Nov 2015	ITF Santiago, Chile	25,000	Clay	(Paraguay) Verónica Cepede Royg	0–6, 6–2, 5–7
Loss	18–21	Jan 2016	ITF Antalya, Turkey	10,000	Clay	(United Kingdom) Tara Moore	6–2, 5–7, 0–6
Win	19–21	Feb 2016	ITF Antalya, Turkey	10,000	Clay	(Slovakia) Viktória Kužmová	2–6, 6–2, 6–0
Win	20–21	Feb 2016	ITF Antalya, Turkey	10,000	Clay	(Georgia (country)) Sofia Kvatsabaia	6–3, 6–1
Win	21–21	Mar 2016	ITF Antalya, Turkey	10,000	Clay	(Ukraine) Anastasiya Vasylyeva	6–3, 6–3
Loss	21–22	Jun 2018	ITF Sassuolo, Italy	15,000	Clay	(Italy) Angelica Moratelli	4–6, 3–6
Loss	21–23	Jun 2021	ITF L'Aquila, Italy	15,000	Clay	(Italy) Tatiana Pieri	6–2, 3–6, 5–7
Loss	21–24	Oct 2022	ITF Heraklion, Greece	15,000	Clay	(Romania) Ilinca Amariei	6–7^{(1–7)}, 2–6
Win	22–24	Sep 2025	ITF Viserba, Italy	15,000	Clay	(Italy) Deborah Chiesa	6–4, 3–6, 7–6^{(8–6)}

=== Doubles: 20 (9–11) ===
Legend $50,000 tournaments (1–0) $25,000 tournaments (2–3) $10/15,000 tournaments (6–8)	Finals by surface Hard (2–1) Clay (7–10)

Result	W–L	Date	Tournament	Tier	Surface	Partner	Opponents	Score
Loss	0–1	May 2006	ITF Falkenberg, Sweden	10,000	Clay	(Germany) Julia Paetow	(Sweden) Mari Andersson (Sweden) Michaela Johansson	2–6, 0–6
Win	1–1	Jul 2006	ITF Birkerød, Denmark	10,000	Clay	(Germany) Julia Paetow	(Denmark) Karina Jacobsgaard (Denmark) Hanne Skak Jensen	7–5, 6–1
Loss	1–2	May 2007	ITF Falkenberg, Sweden	10,000	Clay	(Germany) Franziska Götz	(Sweden) Mari Andersson (Sweden) Nadja Roma	0–6, 5–7
Loss	1–3	Jun 2008	ITF Båstad, Sweden	25,000	Clay	(Hong Kong) Zhang Ling	(Slovakia) Klaudia Boczová (Netherlands) Nicole Thyssen	2–6, 1–6
Loss	1–4	Jan 2012	ITF Mallorca, Spain	10,000	Clay	(Italy) Alice Balducci	(Spain) Yvonne Cavallé Reimers (Spain) Lucía Cervera Vázquez	5–7, 4–6
Win	2–4	Feb 2012	ITF Antalya, Turkey	10,000	Clay	(Italy) Claudia Giovine	(United States) Sanaz Marand (United Kingdom) Nicola Slater	6–3, 3–6, [10–7]
Loss	2–5	Apr 2012	ITF Šibenik, Croatia	10,000	Clay	(Hungary) Vaszilisza Bulgakova	(Ukraine) Sofiya Kovalets (Sweden) Hilda Melander	1–2 ret.
Loss	2–6	Apr 2012	ITF Pomezia, Italy	10,000	Clay	(Italy) Benedetta Davato	(Peru) Bianca Botto (Brazil) Teliana Pereira	6–7^{(3–7)}, 2–6
Loss	2–7	Sep 2012	ITF Dobrich, Bulgaria	25,000	Clay	(Switzerland) Lisa Sabino	(Poland) Katarzyna Piter (Poland) Barbara Sobaszkiewicz	2–6, 5–7
Win	3–7	Feb 2013	ITF Antalya, Turkey	10,000	Clay	(Italy) Gioia Barbieri	(Slovakia) Lenka Juríková (Slovakia) Chantal Škamlová	4–6, 6–3, [10–4]
Loss	3–8	Mar 2013	ITF Gonesse, France	10,000	Clay (i)	(Czech Republic) Kateřina Vaňková	(Netherlands) Cindy Burger (Chile) Daniela Seguel	7–6^{(8–6)}, 3–6, [2–10]
Win	4–8	Oct 2014	ITF Pula, Italy	10,000	Clay	(Switzerland) Lisa Sabino	(Germany) Anna Klasen (Germany) Charlotte Klasen	6–4, 5–7, [10–6]
Loss	4–9	Nov 2014	ITF Pula, Italy	10,000	Clay	(Switzerland) Lisa Sabino	(Italy) Georgia Brescia (Italy) Martina Caregaro	6–3, 4–6, [6–10]
Loss	4–10	Jan 2015	ITF Antalya, Turkey	10,000	Hard	(Slovakia) Lenka Wienerová	(Bosnia and Herzegovina) Anita Husarić (United States) Danielle Mills	4–6, 6–4, [10–12]
Win	5–10	Jan 2015	ITF Antalya, Turkey	10,000	Hard	(Slovakia) Lenka Wienerová	(France) Audrey Albié (France) Alice Bacquié	6–4, 6–4
Loss	5–11	Jul 2015	ITF Darmstadt, Germany	25,000	Clay	(Turkey) Pemra Özgen	(Russia) Irina Khromacheva (Belarus) Lidziya Marozava	4–6, 4–6
Win	6–11	Nov 2015	ITF Bratislava, Slovakia	25,000	Hard (i)	(Slovenia) Dalila Jakupović	(Slovakia) Michaela Hončová (Slovakia) Chantal Škamlová	6–7^{(5–7)}, 6–2, [10–8]
Win	7–11	Apr 2016	ITF Chiasso, Switzerland	25,000	Clay	(Germany) Antonia Lottner	(Poland) Olga Brózda (Poland) Katarzyna Kawa	6–1, 6–1
Win	8–11	Jun 2016	ITF Essen, Germany	50,000	Clay	(Spain) Laura Pous Tió	(Belgium) Elyne Boeykens (Romania) Elena Gabriela Ruse	6–2, 6–3
Win	9–11	Aug 2022	ITF Pescara, Italy	15,000	Clay	(Italy) Anastasia Grymalska	(Italy) Giorgia Pinto (Italy) Gaia Squarcialupi	5–7, 6–1, [12–10]
