= Elyne Boeykens =

Belgian tennis player (born 1991)

- Country (sports): Belgium
- Residence: Belgium
- Born: 3 April 1991 (age 35)
- Turned pro: 2008
- Plays: Right (two-handed backhand)
- Prize money: $68,668

Singles
- Career record: 207–163
- Career titles: 5 ITF
- Highest ranking: No. 297 (1 August 2016)

Doubles
- Career record: 131–113
- Career titles: 9 ITF
- Highest ranking: No. 222 (19 September 2016)

Elyne Boeykens (born 3 April 1991) is a Belgian former tennis player, and currently competing in padel.

From 2010 up to 2017, she won five singles and nine doubles titles on the ITF Women's Circuit. She achieved a career-high singles ranking of world No. 297, on 1 August 2017. Her highest WTA doubles ranking is 222, which she reached on 19 September 2016. Her last match on the pro circuit took place November 2017 at an ITF event in Spain.

She also spent time on the professional padel circuit and in that sport, she represented Belgium at the 2023 European Games, playing the women's double with Dorien Cuypers.
