= 2014 ITF Women's Circuit (April–June) =

The 2014 ITF Women's Circuit is the 2014 edition of the second-tier tour for women's professional tennis. It is organised by the International Tennis Federation and is a tier below the WTA Tour. The ITF Women's Circuit includes tournaments with prize money ranging from $10,000 up to $100,000.

== Key ==
$100,000 tournaments
$75,000 tournaments
$50,000 tournaments
$25,000 tournaments
$15,000 tournaments
$10,000 tournaments
All titles

== Month ==
=== April ===
Week of	Tournament	Winner	Runners-up	Semifinalists	Quarterfinalists
April 7	Pelham, United States; Clay $25,000; Singles and doubles draws	(Germany) Laura Siegemund; 6–1, 6–4	(Kazakhstan) Yulia Putintseva	(United States) Samantha Crawford (United States) Irina Falconi	(Norway) Ulrikke Eikeri (United States) Madison Brengle (Canada) Heidi El Tabakh (Portugal) Michelle Larcher de Brito
April 7	Pelham, United States; Clay $25,000; Singles and doubles draws	(United States) Danielle Lao (United States) Keri Wong; 1–6, 6–4, [10–7]	(Bulgaria) Dia Evtimova (Belarus) Ilona Kremen	(United States) Samantha Crawford (United States) Irina Falconi	(Norway) Ulrikke Eikeri (United States) Madison Brengle (Canada) Heidi El Tabakh (Portugal) Michelle Larcher de Brito
April 7	Melbourne, Australia; Clay $15,000; Singles and doubles draws	(Slovakia) Zuzana Zlochová; 3–6, 7–6^{(7–3)}, 6–4	(China) Han Xinyun	(Bulgaria) Aleksandrina Naydenova (Australia) Zoe Hives	(Thailand) Katherine Westbury (Australia) Ellen Perez (Australia) Viktorija Rajicic (Australia) Jessica Moore
April 7	Melbourne, Australia; Clay $15,000; Singles and doubles draws	(Australia) Jessica Moore (Bulgaria) Aleksandrina Naydenova; 7–5, 6–7^{(5–7)}, [10–7]	(Japan) Miyu Kato (Japan) Yuuki Tanaka	(Bulgaria) Aleksandrina Naydenova (Australia) Zoe Hives	(Thailand) Katherine Westbury (Australia) Ellen Perez (Australia) Viktorija Rajicic (Australia) Jessica Moore
April 7	Dakar, Senegal; Hard $15,000; Singles and doubles draws	(Switzerland) Conny Perrin; 6–0, 7–5	(South Africa) Chanel Simmonds	(Portugal) Bárbara Luz (France) Chloé Paquet	(Italy) Giulia Sussarello (France) Manon Arcangioli (Philippines) Katharina Lehnert (Russia) Ekaterina Yashina
April 7	Dakar, Senegal; Hard $15,000; Singles and doubles draws	(South Africa) Chanel Simmonds (United Kingdom) Emily Webley-Smith; 6–4, 7–5	(Switzerland) Conny Perrin (Russia) Ekaterina Yashina	(Portugal) Bárbara Luz (France) Chloé Paquet	(Italy) Giulia Sussarello (France) Manon Arcangioli (Philippines) Katharina Lehnert (Russia) Ekaterina Yashina
April 7	São José do Rio Preto, Brazil; Clay $10,000; Singles and doubles draws	(Brazil) Gabriela Cé; 1–1, ret.	(Brazil) Paula Cristina Gonçalves	(Brazil) Nathaly Kurata (Argentina) Victoria Bosio	(Brazil) Maria Fernanda Alves (Brazil) Juliana Rocha Cardoso (Brazil) Eduarda Piai (Argentina) Sofía Blanco
April 7	São José do Rio Preto, Brazil; Clay $10,000; Singles and doubles draws	(Brazil) Maria Fernanda Alves (Brazil) Paula Cristina Gonçalves; 6–2, 6–0	(Brazil) Carolina Alves (Brazil) Ingrid Gamarra Martins	(Brazil) Nathaly Kurata (Argentina) Victoria Bosio	(Brazil) Maria Fernanda Alves (Brazil) Juliana Rocha Cardoso (Brazil) Eduarda Piai (Argentina) Sofía Blanco
April 7	Bol, Croatia; Clay $10,000; Singles and doubles draws	(Bulgaria) Viktoriya Tomova; 6–1, 6–2	(Croatia) Iva Mekovec	(Germany) Anne Schäfer (Hungary) Ágnes Bukta	(Croatia) Tena Lukas (Serbia) Milana Špremo (Slovenia) Eva Zagorac (Austria) Janina Toljan
April 7	Bol, Croatia; Clay $10,000; Singles and doubles draws	(Hungary) Ágnes Bukta (Bulgaria) Viktoriya Tomova; 6–2, 6–1	(Czech Republic) Karolína Stuchlá (France) Carla Touly	(Germany) Anne Schäfer (Hungary) Ágnes Bukta	(Croatia) Tena Lukas (Serbia) Milana Špremo (Slovenia) Eva Zagorac (Austria) Janina Toljan
April 7	Sharm el-Sheikh, Egypt; Hard $10,000; Singles and doubles draws	(Romania) Elena-Teodora Cadar; 2–6, 7–6^{(8–6)}, 6–4	(Spain) Nuria Párrizas Díaz	(Italy) Giulia Bruzzone (Russia) Anna Morgina	(Sweden) Brenda Njuki (France) Pauline Payet (Slovakia) Vivien Juhászová (Romania) Cristina Ene
April 7	Sharm el-Sheikh, Egypt; Hard $10,000; Singles and doubles draws	(Czech Republic) Kristýna Hrabalová (Slovakia) Vivien Juhászová; 6–1, 4–6, [11–9]	(Czech Republic) Martina Přádová (Czech Republic) Anna Vrbenská	(Italy) Giulia Bruzzone (Russia) Anna Morgina	(Sweden) Brenda Njuki (France) Pauline Payet (Slovakia) Vivien Juhászová (Romania) Cristina Ene
April 7	Heraklion, Greece; Hard $10,000; Singles and doubles draws	(Czech Republic) Tereza Martincová; 6–4, 6–4	(Czech Republic) Pernilla Mendesová	(Greece) Valentini Grammatikopoulou (Croatia) Ema Mikulčić	(Russia) Natela Dzalamidze (Bulgaria) Borislava Botusharova (Bulgaria) Julia Stamatova (United Kingdom) Amanda Carreras
April 7	Heraklion, Greece; Hard $10,000; Singles and doubles draws	(Belgium) Magali Kempen (Belgium) Elke Lemmens; 1–6, 7–5, [10–8]	(Russia) Natela Dzalamidze (Greece) Valentini Grammatikopoulou	(Greece) Valentini Grammatikopoulou (Croatia) Ema Mikulčić	(Russia) Natela Dzalamidze (Bulgaria) Borislava Botusharova (Bulgaria) Julia Stamatova (United Kingdom) Amanda Carreras
April 7	Chennai, India; Clay $10,000; Singles and doubles draws	(India) Prarthana Thombare; 4–6, 6–3, 7–6^{(7–5)}	(India) Eetee Maheta	(India) Nidhi Chilumula (India) Natasha Palha	(Thailand) Varunya Wongteanchai (China) Wang Xiyao (India) Rishika Sunkara (Japan) Hirono Watanabe
April 7	Chennai, India; Clay $10,000; Singles and doubles draws	(India) Sharmada Balu (India) Rishika Sunkara; 6–0, 7–6^{(7–4)}	(India) Natasha Palha (India) Prarthana Thombare	(India) Nidhi Chilumula (India) Natasha Palha	(Thailand) Varunya Wongteanchai (China) Wang Xiyao (India) Rishika Sunkara (Japan) Hirono Watanabe
April 7	Santa Margherita di Pula, Italy; Clay $10,000; Singles and doubles draws	(Latvia) Jeļena Ostapenko; 7–6^{(7–4)}, 6–1	(France) Jade Suvrijn	(Argentina) Tatiana Búa (Romania) Diana Buzean	(Bosnia and Herzegovina) Jelena Simić (Ecuador) Charlotte Römer (Italy) Alice Matteucci (Italy) Jasmin Ladurner
April 7	Santa Margherita di Pula, Italy; Clay $10,000; Singles and doubles draws	(Japan) Mana Ayukawa (Latvia) Jeļena Ostapenko; 7–5, 3–6, [10–5]	(Italy) Alice Balducci (Romania) Diana Buzean	(Argentina) Tatiana Búa (Romania) Diana Buzean	(Bosnia and Herzegovina) Jelena Simić (Ecuador) Charlotte Römer (Italy) Alice Matteucci (Italy) Jasmin Ladurner
April 7	Shymkent, Kazakhstan; Clay $10,000; Singles and doubles draws	(Kazakhstan) Ekaterina Klyueva; 7–6^{(7–1)}, 6–4	(Russia) Anastasia Rudakova	(Slovakia) Katarína Strešnáková (Russia) Liubov Vasilyeva	(Uzbekistan) Arina Folts (Kazakhstan) Yekaterina Gubanova (Russia) Marta Paigina (Russia) Mariia Tcakanian
April 7	Shymkent, Kazakhstan; Clay $10,000; Singles and doubles draws	(Kazakhstan) Ekaterina Klyueva (Russia) Sofia Smagina; 7–6^{(7–3)}, 6–0	(Russia) Anastasia Rudakova (Russia) Liubov Vasilyeva	(Slovakia) Katarína Strešnáková (Russia) Liubov Vasilyeva	(Uzbekistan) Arina Folts (Kazakhstan) Yekaterina Gubanova (Russia) Marta Paigina (Russia) Mariia Tcakanian
April 7	Antalya, Turkey; Hard $10,000; Singles and doubles draws	(Turkey) İpek Soylu; 7–5, 4–6, 6–1	(Israel) Deniz Khazaniuk	(Sweden) Susanne Celik (France) Caroline Roméo	(France) Victoria Muntean (North Macedonia) Lina Gjorcheska (Japan) Kotomi Takahata (Turkey) Başak Eraydın
April 7	Antalya, Turkey; Hard $10,000; Singles and doubles draws	(Turkey) Cemre Anıl (Japan) Kotomi Takahata; 2–6, 7–6^{(7–5)}, [10–6]	(Russia) Yuliya Kalabina (Russia) Mayya Katsitadze	(Sweden) Susanne Celik (France) Caroline Roméo	(France) Victoria Muntean (North Macedonia) Lina Gjorcheska (Japan) Kotomi Takahata (Turkey) Başak Eraydın
April 7	Gloucester, United Kingdom; Hard (indoor) $10,000; Singles and doubles draws	(United States) Bernarda Pera; 6–3, 6–1	(Belgium) Klaartje Liebens	(Japan) Hiroko Kuwata (United Kingdom) Katy Dunne	(Belarus) Sviatlana Pirazhenka (Germany) Justine Ozga (Italy) Anna Remondina (Germany) Nora Niedmers
April 7	Gloucester, United Kingdom; Hard (indoor) $10,000; Singles and doubles draws	(United Kingdom) Lucy Brown (Sweden) Hilda Melander; 7–5, 6–3	(United Kingdom) Sarah Beth Askew (United Kingdom) Katy Dunne	(Japan) Hiroko Kuwata (United Kingdom) Katy Dunne	(Belarus) Sviatlana Pirazhenka (Germany) Justine Ozga (Italy) Anna Remondina (Germany) Nora Niedmers
April 14	Dothan Pro Tennis Classic; Dothan, United States; Clay $50,000; Singles – Doubles	(United States) Grace Min; 6–3, 6–1	(United States) Victoria Duval	(Belarus) Olga Govortsova (United States) Allie Kiick	(United States) Melanie Oudin (Estonia) Anett Kontaveit (Kazakhstan) Yulia Putintseva (Paraguay) Verónica Cepede Royg
April 14	Dothan Pro Tennis Classic; Dothan, United States; Clay $50,000; Singles – Doubles	(Estonia) Anett Kontaveit (Belarus) Ilona Kremen; 6–1, 5–7, [10–5]	(United States) Shelby Rogers (Australia) Olivia Rogowska	(Belarus) Olga Govortsova (United States) Allie Kiick	(United States) Melanie Oudin (Estonia) Anett Kontaveit (Kazakhstan) Yulia Putintseva (Paraguay) Verónica Cepede Royg
April 14	Qarshi, Uzbekistan; Hard $25,000; Singles and doubles draws	(Czech Republic) Tereza Smitková; 6–3, 4–6, 7–6^{(7–4)}	(Uzbekistan) Nigina Abduraimova	(Romania) Ana Bogdan (India) Ankita Raina	(United Kingdom) Naomi Broady (United Kingdom) Tara Moore (Russia) Ekaterina Bychkova (Russia) Yana Sizikova
April 14	Qarshi, Uzbekistan; Hard $25,000; Singles and doubles draws	(Uzbekistan) Albina Khabibulina (Ukraine) Anastasiya Vasylyeva; 2–6, 7–5, [10–4]	(Russia) Ekaterina Bychkova (Russia) Veronika Kudermetova	(Romania) Ana Bogdan (India) Ankita Raina	(United Kingdom) Naomi Broady (United Kingdom) Tara Moore (Russia) Ekaterina Bychkova (Russia) Yana Sizikova
April 14	Sharm el-Sheikh, Egypt; Hard $10,000; Singles and doubles draws	(Spain) Nuria Párrizas Díaz; 6–0, 3–6, 6–3	(Romania) Elena-Teodora Cadar	(Austria) Pia König (United Kingdom) Katy Dunne	(Italy) Valeri Prosperi (Japan) Yuka Mori (Italy) Giulia Bruzzone (Russia) Anna Morgina
April 14	Sharm el-Sheikh, Egypt; Hard $10,000; Singles and doubles draws	(United Kingdom) Katy Dunne (Russia) Anna Morgina; 7–5, 7–6^{(7–5)}	(China) Dong Xiaorong (Austria) Pia König	(Austria) Pia König (United Kingdom) Katy Dunne	(Italy) Valeri Prosperi (Japan) Yuka Mori (Italy) Giulia Bruzzone (Russia) Anna Morgina
April 14	Heraklion, Greece; Hard $10,000; Singles and doubles draws	(Czech Republic) Pernilla Mendesová; 6–2, 6–2	(Greece) Maria Sakkari	(Germany) Lena-Marie Hofmann (Greece) Valentini Grammatikopoulou	(Belgium) Marie Benoît (Germany) Luisa Marie Huber (Spain) Lucía Cervera Vázquez (Greece) Despina Papamichail
April 14	Heraklion, Greece; Hard $10,000; Singles and doubles draws	(Russia) Natela Dzalamidze (Greece) Valentini Grammatikopoulou; 6–7^{(6–8)}, 6–3, [10–5]	(Greece) Despina Papamichail (Greece) Maria Sakkari	(Germany) Lena-Marie Hofmann (Greece) Valentini Grammatikopoulou	(Belgium) Marie Benoît (Germany) Luisa Marie Huber (Spain) Lucía Cervera Vázquez (Greece) Despina Papamichail
April 14	Santa Margherita di Pula, Italy; Clay $10,000; Singles and doubles draws	(Romania) Andreea Mitu; 6–4, 6–3	(Spain) Sara Sorribes Tormo	(Poland) Anna Korzeniak (France) Jade Suvrijn	(Italy) Alice Savoretti (France) Audrey Albié (Ecuador) Charlotte Römer (Latvia) Jeļena Ostapenko
April 14	Santa Margherita di Pula, Italy; Clay $10,000; Singles and doubles draws	(Romania) Stefana Andrei (Romania) Andreea Mitu; 7–6^{(7–5)}, 6–2	(France) Audrey Albié (France) Manon Peral	(Poland) Anna Korzeniak (France) Jade Suvrijn	(Italy) Alice Savoretti (France) Audrey Albié (Ecuador) Charlotte Römer (Latvia) Jeļena Ostapenko
April 14	Shymkent, Kazakhstan; Clay $10,000; Singles and doubles draws	(Russia) Anastasia Rudakova; 6–2, 6–3	(Russia) Liubov Vasilyeva	(Russia) Daria Lodikova (Russia) Liudmila Vasilyeva	(Belarus) Viktoryia Mun (Bulgaria) Vivian Zlatanova (Kazakhstan) Ekaterina Klyueva (Kazakhstan) Alexandra Grinchishina
April 14	Shymkent, Kazakhstan; Clay $10,000; Singles and doubles draws	(Ukraine) Diana Bogoliy (Russia) Margarita Lazareva; 6–4, 7–5	(Russia) Anastasia Rudakova (Russia) Liubov Vasilyeva	(Russia) Daria Lodikova (Russia) Liudmila Vasilyeva	(Belarus) Viktoryia Mun (Bulgaria) Vivian Zlatanova (Kazakhstan) Ekaterina Klyueva (Kazakhstan) Alexandra Grinchishina
April 14	Antalya, Turkey; Hard $10,000; Singles and doubles draws	(Netherlands) Bibiane Schoofs; 6–0, 6–3	(Czech Republic) Sandra Hönigová	(France) Caroline Roméo (Turkey) İpek Soylu	(Austria) Lena Reichel (Russia) Ksenia Gaydarzhi (Russia) Anastasiya Komardina (China) Zheng Wushuang
April 14	Antalya, Turkey; Hard $10,000; Singles and doubles draws	(Japan) Kotomi Takahata (United States) Tina Tehrani; 6–1, 6–3	(China) Zhang Ying (China) Zheng Wushuang	(France) Caroline Roméo (Turkey) İpek Soylu	(Austria) Lena Reichel (Russia) Ksenia Gaydarzhi (Russia) Anastasiya Komardina (China) Zheng Wushuang
April 21	Seoul Open Women's Challenger; Seoul, South Korea; Hard $50,000; Singles – Doubles	(Japan) Misaki Doi; 6–1, 7–6^{(7–3)}	(Japan) Misa Eguchi	(Czech Republic) Kristýna Plíšková (Belgium) An-Sophie Mestach	(Japan) Miharu Imanishi (Japan) Erika Sema (Australia) Storm Sanders (Japan) Risa Ozaki
April 21	Seoul Open Women's Challenger; Seoul, South Korea; Hard $50,000; Singles – Doubles	(Chinese Taipei) Chan Chin-wei (Chinese Taipei) Chuang Chia-jung; 6–4, 6–3	(France) Irena Pavlovic (Czech Republic) Kristýna Plíšková	(Czech Republic) Kristýna Plíšková (Belgium) An-Sophie Mestach	(Japan) Miharu Imanishi (Japan) Erika Sema (Australia) Storm Sanders (Japan) Risa Ozaki
April 21	Lale Cup; Istanbul, Turkey; Hard $50,000; Singles – Doubles	(Czech Republic) Denisa Allertová; 6–2, 6–3	(Ukraine) Yuliya Beygelzimer	(Russia) Vitalia Diatchenko (Russia) Ksenia Pervak	(Italy) Maria Elena Camerin (Ukraine) Kateryna Kozlova (Poland) Paula Kania (Ukraine) Lyudmyla Kichenok
April 21	Lale Cup; Istanbul, Turkey; Hard $50,000; Singles – Doubles	(Czech Republic) Petra Krejsová (Czech Republic) Tereza Smitková; 1–6, 7–6^{(7–2)}, [11–9]	(Netherlands) Michaëlla Krajicek (Serbia) Aleksandra Krunić	(Russia) Vitalia Diatchenko (Russia) Ksenia Pervak	(Italy) Maria Elena Camerin (Ukraine) Kateryna Kozlova (Poland) Paula Kania (Ukraine) Lyudmyla Kichenok
April 21	Boyd Tinsley Women's Clay Court Classic; Charlottesville, United States; Clay $50,000; Singles – Doubles	(United States) Taylor Townsend; 6–2, 6–3	(Paraguay) Montserrat González	(United States) Grace Min (United States) Sanaz Marand	(Canada) Françoise Abanda (United States) Nicole Gibbs (Kazakhstan) Sesil Karatantcheva (United States) Victoria Duval
April 21	Boyd Tinsley Women's Clay Court Classic; Charlottesville, United States; Clay $50,000; Singles – Doubles	(United States) Asia Muhammad (United States) Taylor Townsend; 6–3, 6–1	(United States) Irina Falconi (United States) Maria Sanchez	(United States) Grace Min (United States) Sanaz Marand	(Canada) Françoise Abanda (United States) Nicole Gibbs (Kazakhstan) Sesil Karatantcheva (United States) Victoria Duval
April 21	Nanning, China; Hard $25,000; Singles and doubles draws	(China) Xu Yifan; 6–3, 7–6^{(7–1)}	(Chinese Taipei) Chan Yung-jan	(Hong Kong) Zhang Ling (Japan) Hiroko Kuwata	(Japan) Riko Sawayanagi (China) Zhu Lin (Japan) Nao Hibino (China) Tang Haochen
April 21	Nanning, China; Hard $25,000; Singles and doubles draws	(China) Han Xinyun (China) Zhang Kailin; 7–6^{(10–8)}, 7–6^{(7–3)}	(Hong Kong) Zhang Ling (China) Zheng Saisai	(Hong Kong) Zhang Ling (Japan) Hiroko Kuwata	(Japan) Riko Sawayanagi (China) Zhu Lin (Japan) Nao Hibino (China) Tang Haochen
April 21	Chiasso, Switzerland; Clay $25,000; Singles and doubles draws	(Czech Republic) Lucie Hradecká; 6–3, 7–6^{(7–4)}	(Croatia) Tereza Mrdeža	(Switzerland) Amra Sadiković (Netherlands) Arantxa Rus	(Serbia) Jovana Jakšić (Liechtenstein) Stephanie Vogt (Serbia) Katarina Jokić (Switzerland) Jil Teichmann
April 21	Chiasso, Switzerland; Clay $25,000; Singles and doubles draws	(Switzerland) Chiara Grimm (Switzerland) Jil Teichmann; 7–5, 6–3	(Italy) Alice Matteucci (Italy) Camilla Rosatello	(Switzerland) Amra Sadiković (Netherlands) Arantxa Rus	(Serbia) Jovana Jakšić (Liechtenstein) Stephanie Vogt (Serbia) Katarina Jokić (Switzerland) Jil Teichmann
April 21	Namangan, Uzbekistan; Hard $25,000; Singles and doubles draws	(United Kingdom) Naomi Broady; 6–3, 6–4	(Uzbekistan) Nigina Abduraimova	(Ukraine) Anastasiya Vasylyeva (Russia) Ekaterina Bychkova	(Romania) Ana Bogdan (Russia) Polina Monova (Russia) Darya Kasatkina (Uzbekistan) Sabina Sharipova
April 21	Namangan, Uzbekistan; Hard $25,000; Singles and doubles draws	(Russia) Eugeniya Pashkova (Ukraine) Ganna Poznikhirenko; 6–4, 6–1	(Russia) Yana Buchina (Venezuela) Andrea Gámiz	(Ukraine) Anastasiya Vasylyeva (Russia) Ekaterina Bychkova	(Romania) Ana Bogdan (Russia) Polina Monova (Russia) Darya Kasatkina (Uzbekistan) Sabina Sharipova
April 21	Sharm el-Sheikh, Egypt; Hard $10,000; Singles and doubles draws	(Republic of Ireland) Amy Bowtell; 6–7^{(5–7)}, 6–0, 7–6^{(8–6)}	(United Kingdom) Katie Boulter	(Spain) Nuria Párrizas Díaz (Romania) Elena-Teodora Cadar	(Finland) Emma Laine (France) Alix Collombon (Serbia) Nevena Selaković (Italy) Valeria Prosperi
April 21	Sharm el-Sheikh, Egypt; Hard $10,000; Singles and doubles draws	(United Kingdom) Harriet Dart (United Kingdom) Katy Dunne; 6–4, 6–4	(Japan) Yuka Mori (United Kingdom) Eden Silva	(Spain) Nuria Párrizas Díaz (Romania) Elena-Teodora Cadar	(Finland) Emma Laine (France) Alix Collombon (Serbia) Nevena Selaković (Italy) Valeria Prosperi
April 21	Heraklion, Greece; Hard $10,000; Singles and doubles draws	(Greece) Maria Sakkari; 6–1, 1–6, 6–3	(Greece) Despina Papamichail	(Belgium) Marie Benoît (France) Lou Brouleau	(Greece) Valentini Grammatikopoulou (Germany) Julia Wachaczyk (Sweden) Hilda Melander (Belgium) Kimberley Zimmermann
April 21	Heraklion, Greece; Hard $10,000; Singles and doubles draws	(Russia) Polina Leykina (Greece) Despina Papamichail; 6–2, 6–2	(Belgium) Marie Benoît (Belgium) Kimberley Zimmermann	(Belgium) Marie Benoît (France) Lou Brouleau	(Greece) Valentini Grammatikopoulou (Germany) Julia Wachaczyk (Sweden) Hilda Melander (Belgium) Kimberley Zimmermann
April 21	Santa Margherita di Pula, Italy; Clay $10,000; Singles and doubles draws	(Latvia) Jeļena Ostapenko; 6–2, 7–5	(Spain) Yvonne Cavallé Reimers	(France) Chloé Paquet (France) Manon Arcangioli	(United States) Alexandria Stiteler (France) Joséphine Boualem (Switzerland) Tess Sugnaux (Germany) Laura Schaeder
April 21	Santa Margherita di Pula, Italy; Clay $10,000; Singles and doubles draws	(Netherlands) Rosalie van der Hoek (Latvia) Jeļena Ostapenko; 6–1, 2–6, [10–6]	(Spain) Yvonne Cavallé Reimers (Spain) Olga Sáez Larra	(France) Chloé Paquet (France) Manon Arcangioli	(United States) Alexandria Stiteler (France) Joséphine Boualem (Switzerland) Tess Sugnaux (Germany) Laura Schaeder
April 21	Bangkok, Thailand; Hard $10,000; Singles and doubles draws	(Japan) Yurina Koshino; 6–2, 7–5	(Australia) Ashling Sumner	(Japan) Ayaka Okuno (India) Natasha Palha	(Japan) Chihiro Nunome (Thailand) Varunya Wongteanchai (Japan) Michika Ozeki (Thailand) Patcharin Cheapchandej
April 21	Bangkok, Thailand; Hard $10,000; Singles and doubles draws	(Japan) Yurina Koshino (Japan) Chihiro Nunome; 6–4, 6–2	(Japan) Ayaka Okuno (Australia) Ashling Sumner	(Japan) Ayaka Okuno (India) Natasha Palha	(Japan) Chihiro Nunome (Thailand) Varunya Wongteanchai (Japan) Michika Ozeki (Thailand) Patcharin Cheapchandej
April 21	Antalya, Turkey; Hard $10,000; Singles and doubles draws	(United Kingdom) Eleanor Dean; 5–1, ret.	(Austria) Lena Reichel	(France) Victoria Muntean (Belgium) Deborah Kerfs	(China) Li Huijie (Germany) Linda Prenkovic (France) Caroline Roméo (United States) Tina Tehrani
April 21	Antalya, Turkey; Hard $10,000; Singles and doubles draws	(Mexico) Victoria Rodríguez (Mexico) Marcela Zacarías; 6–1, 6–1	(Mexico) Camila Fuentes (Hungary) Szabina Szlavikovics	(France) Victoria Muntean (Belgium) Deborah Kerfs	(China) Li Huijie (Germany) Linda Prenkovic (France) Caroline Roméo (United States) Tina Tehrani
April 28	Kangaroo Cup; Gifu, Japan; Hard $75,000; Singles – Doubles	(Hungary) Tímea Babos; 6–1, 6–2	(Russia) Ekaterina Bychkova	(Australia) Jarmila Gajdošová (Belgium) An-Sophie Mestach	(Japan) Misaki Doi (Australia) Tammi Patterson (Japan) Risa Ozaki (Japan) Misa Eguchi
April 28	Kangaroo Cup; Gifu, Japan; Hard $75,000; Singles – Doubles	(Australia) Jarmila Gajdošová (Australia) Arina Rodionova; 6–3, 6–3	(Japan) Misaki Doi (Chinese Taipei) Hsieh Shu-ying	(Australia) Jarmila Gajdošová (Belgium) An-Sophie Mestach	(Japan) Misaki Doi (Australia) Tammi Patterson (Japan) Risa Ozaki (Japan) Misa Eguchi
April 28	Anning Open; Anning, China; Clay $50,000; Singles – Doubles	(China) Zheng Saisai; 6–2, 6–3	(Serbia) Jovana Jakšić	(Slovenia) Tadeja Majerič (Australia) Monique Adamczak	(Netherlands) Cindy Burger (Bulgaria) Aleksandrina Naydenova (Russia) Marina Melnikova (Chinese Taipei) Hsieh Su-wei
April 28	Anning Open; Anning, China; Clay $50,000; Singles – Doubles	(China) Han Xinyun (China) Zhang Kailin; 6–4, 6–2	(Thailand) Varatchaya Wongteanchai (Hong Kong) Zhang Ling	(Slovenia) Tadeja Majerič (Australia) Monique Adamczak	(Netherlands) Cindy Burger (Bulgaria) Aleksandrina Naydenova (Russia) Marina Melnikova (Chinese Taipei) Hsieh Su-wei
April 28	Audi Melbourne Pro Tennis Classic; Indian Harbour Beach, United States; Clay $50,000; Singles – Doubles	(United States) Taylor Townsend; 6–1, 6–1	(Kazakhstan) Yulia Putintseva	(Estonia) Anett Kontaveit (Canada) Heidi El Tabakh	(New Zealand) Marina Erakovic (United States) Allie Kiick (United States) Julia Boserup (Portugal) Michelle Larcher de Brito
April 28	Audi Melbourne Pro Tennis Classic; Indian Harbour Beach, United States; Clay $50,000; Singles – Doubles	(United States) Asia Muhammad (United States) Taylor Townsend; 6–2, 6–1	(United States) Jan Abaza (United States) Sanaz Marand	(Estonia) Anett Kontaveit (Canada) Heidi El Tabakh	(New Zealand) Marina Erakovic (United States) Allie Kiick (United States) Julia Boserup (Portugal) Michelle Larcher de Brito
April 28	Wiesbaden, Germany; Clay $25,000; Singles and doubles draws	(Russia) Ekaterina Alexandrova; 7–6^{(7–4)}, 4–6, 6–3	(Austria) Tamira Paszek	(Czech Republic) Barbora Krejčíková (Netherlands) Arantxa Rus	(Israel) Julia Glushko (Czech Republic) Renata Voráčová (United States) Madison Brengle (Czech Republic) Lucie Hradecká
April 28	Wiesbaden, Germany; Clay $25,000; Singles and doubles draws	(Switzerland) Viktorija Golubic (Latvia) Diāna Marcinkēviča; 6–4, 6–3	(Israel) Julia Glushko (Luxembourg) Mandy Minella	(Czech Republic) Barbora Krejčíková (Netherlands) Arantxa Rus	(Israel) Julia Glushko (Czech Republic) Renata Voráčová (United States) Madison Brengle (Czech Republic) Lucie Hradecká
April 28	Seoul, South Korea; Hard $15,000; Singles and doubles draws	(Czech Republic) Kateřina Vaňková; 5–7, 7–5, 7–5	(South Korea) Lee So-ra	(South Korea) Lee Ye-ra (South Korea) Yoo Mi	(Australia) Jessica Moore (Russia) Ekaterina Yashina (Australia) Alison Bai (China) Lu Jiajing
April 28	Seoul, South Korea; Hard $15,000; Singles and doubles draws	(China) Liu Chang (China) Tian Ran; 6–4, 6–7^{(5–7)}, [10–6]	(South Korea) Han Na-lae (South Korea) Yoo Mi	(South Korea) Lee Ye-ra (South Korea) Yoo Mi	(Australia) Jessica Moore (Russia) Ekaterina Yashina (Australia) Alison Bai (China) Lu Jiajing
April 28	Sharm el-Sheikh, Egypt; Hard $10,000; Singles and doubles draws	(Serbia) Nina Stojanović; 3–6, 6–4, 6–3	(United Kingdom) Katie Boulter	(United Kingdom) Katy Dunne (China) Dong Xiaorong	(United Kingdom) Eden Silva (United Kingdom) Harriet Dart (Austria) Pia König (Russia) Anna Morgina
April 28	Sharm el-Sheikh, Egypt; Hard $10,000; Singles and doubles draws	(United Kingdom) Katie Boulter (Serbia) Nina Stojanović; 6–4, 6–2	(China) Dong Xiaorong (Austria) Pia König	(United Kingdom) Katy Dunne (China) Dong Xiaorong	(United Kingdom) Eden Silva (United Kingdom) Harriet Dart (Austria) Pia König (Russia) Anna Morgina
April 28	Santa Margherita di Pula, Italy; Clay $10,000; Singles and doubles draws	(Latvia) Jeļena Ostapenko; 4–6, 7–6^{(7–1)}, 6–3	(Italy) Alice Balducci	(Italy) Martina Caregaro (Italy) Claudia Giovine	(Italy) Corinna Dentoni (Italy) Martina Colmegna (Italy) Camilla Rosatello (Russia) Anastasia Pivovarova
April 28	Santa Margherita di Pula, Italy; Clay $10,000; Singles and doubles draws	(Romania) Diana Buzean (Italy) Claudia Giovine; 6–2, 6–4	(Italy) Martina Caregaro (Italy) Anna Floris	(Italy) Martina Caregaro (Italy) Claudia Giovine	(Italy) Corinna Dentoni (Italy) Martina Colmegna (Italy) Camilla Rosatello (Russia) Anastasia Pivovarova
April 28	Bangkok, Thailand; Hard $10,000; Singles and doubles draws	(Japan) Michika Ozeki; 6–4, 6–3	(Japan) Kyōka Okamura	(Chinese Taipei) Lee Hua-chen (India) Natasha Palha	(Australia) Ashling Sumner (Thailand) Varunya Wongteanchai (Netherlands) Mandy Wagemaker (Norway) Emma Flood
April 28	Bangkok, Thailand; Hard $10,000; Singles and doubles draws	(Thailand) Nungnadda Wannasuk (Thailand) Varunya Wongteanchai; 1–6, 6–3, [10–8]	(Chinese Taipei) Lee Hua-chen (India) Shweta Rana	(Chinese Taipei) Lee Hua-chen (India) Natasha Palha	(Australia) Ashling Sumner (Thailand) Varunya Wongteanchai (Netherlands) Mandy Wagemaker (Norway) Emma Flood
April 28	Antalya, Turkey; Hard $10,000; Singles and doubles draws	(Hungary) Anna Bondár; 6–3, 6–2	(Russia) Olga Doroshina	(Mexico) Victoria Rodríguez (Mexico) Ximena Hermoso	(Belgium) Marie Benoît (France) Océane Dodin (Mexico) Marcela Zacarías (Chinese Taipei) Lee Pei-chi
April 28	Antalya, Turkey; Hard $10,000; Singles and doubles draws	(Mexico) Victoria Rodríguez (Mexico) Marcela Zacarías; 6–4, 4–6, [10–5]	(Ukraine) Alona Fomina (Chinese Taipei) Lee Pei-chi	(Mexico) Victoria Rodríguez (Mexico) Ximena Hermoso	(Belgium) Marie Benoît (France) Océane Dodin (Mexico) Marcela Zacarías (Chinese Taipei) Lee Pei-chi
April 28	Andijan, Uzbekistan; Hard $10,000; Singles and doubles draws	(Russia) Polina Monova; 6–2, 6–2	(Belarus) Sviatlana Pirazhenka	(Russia) Veronika Kudermetova (Uzbekistan) Albina Khabibulina	(Serbia) Barbara Bonić (India) Prarthana Thombare (Uzbekistan) Vlada Ekshibarova (Uzbekistan) Guzal Yusupova
April 28	Andijan, Uzbekistan; Hard $10,000; Singles and doubles draws	(Uzbekistan) Albina Khabibulina (Russia) Veronika Kudermetova; 6–4, 7–6^{(7–5)}	(Russia) Polina Monova (Russia) Yana Sizikova	(Russia) Veronika Kudermetova (Uzbekistan) Albina Khabibulina	(Serbia) Barbara Bonić (India) Prarthana Thombare (Uzbekistan) Vlada Ekshibarova (Uzbekistan) Guzal Yusupova

=== May ===
Week of	Tournament	Winner	Runners-up	Semifinalists	Quarterfinalists
May 5	Open GDF Suez de Cagnes-sur-Mer Alpes-Maritimes; Cagnes-sur-Mer, France; Clay $100,000; Singles – Doubles	(Canada) Sharon Fichman; 6–2, 6–2	(Switzerland) Timea Bacsinszky	(Netherlands) Kiki Bertens (France) Mathilde Johansson	(United Kingdom) Heather Watson (Austria) Tamira Paszek (United States) Sachia Vickery (Ukraine) Maryna Zanevska
May 5	Open GDF Suez de Cagnes-sur-Mer Alpes-Maritimes; Cagnes-sur-Mer, France; Clay $100,000; Singles – Doubles	(Netherlands) Kiki Bertens (Sweden) Johanna Larsson; 7–6^{(7–4)}, 6–4	(Argentina) Tatiana Búa (Chile) Daniela Seguel	(Netherlands) Kiki Bertens (France) Mathilde Johansson	(United Kingdom) Heather Watson (Austria) Tamira Paszek (United States) Sachia Vickery (Ukraine) Maryna Zanevska
May 5	Empire Slovak Open; Trnava, Slovakia; Clay $75,000; Singles – Doubles	(Slovakia) Anna Karolína Schmiedlová; 6–4, 6–2	(Czech Republic) Barbora Záhlavová-Strýcová	(Serbia) Aleksandra Krunić (Ukraine) Lesia Tsurenko	(United States) Madison Brengle (Australia) Olivia Rogowska (Montenegro) Danka Kovinić (Czech Republic) Kateřina Siniaková
May 5	Empire Slovak Open; Trnava, Slovakia; Clay $75,000; Singles – Doubles	(Liechtenstein) Stephanie Vogt (China) Zheng Saisai; 6–4, 6–2	(Russia) Margarita Gasparyan (Russia) Evgeniya Rodina	(Serbia) Aleksandra Krunić (Ukraine) Lesia Tsurenko	(United States) Madison Brengle (Australia) Olivia Rogowska (Montenegro) Danka Kovinić (Czech Republic) Kateřina Siniaková
May 5	Fukuoka International Women's Cup; Fukuoka, Japan; Grass $50,000; Singles – Doubles	(United Kingdom) Naomi Broady; 5–7, 6–3, 6–4	(Czech Republic) Kristýna Plíšková	(Chinese Taipei) Chan Yung-jan (Russia) Ekaterina Bychkova	(Japan) Miharu Imanishi (Japan) Erika Sema (Japan) Shuko Aoyama (Thailand) Tamarine Tanasugarn
May 5	Fukuoka International Women's Cup; Fukuoka, Japan; Grass $50,000; Singles – Doubles	(Japan) Shuko Aoyama (Japan) Eri Hozumi; 6–3, 6–4	(United Kingdom) Naomi Broady (Greece) Eleni Daniilidou	(Chinese Taipei) Chan Yung-jan (Russia) Ekaterina Bychkova	(Japan) Miharu Imanishi (Japan) Erika Sema (Japan) Shuko Aoyama (Thailand) Tamarine Tanasugarn
May 5	Incheon, South Korea; Hard $25,000; Singles and doubles draws	(Sweden) Susanne Celik; 4–6, 6–3, 6–4	(China) Han Xinyun	(Bolivia) María Fernanda Álvarez Terán (South Korea) Jang Su-jeong	(South Korea) Lee Ye-ra (South Korea) Han Na-lae (Japan) Akari Inoue (Russia) Irina Khromacheva
May 5	Incheon, South Korea; Hard $25,000; Singles and doubles draws	(South Korea) Han Na-lae (South Korea) Yoo Mi; 6–1, 6–1	(Thailand) Noppawan Lertcheewakarn (Turkey) Melis Sezer	(Bolivia) María Fernanda Álvarez Terán (South Korea) Jang Su-jeong	(South Korea) Lee Ye-ra (South Korea) Han Na-lae (Japan) Akari Inoue (Russia) Irina Khromacheva
May 5	Tunis, Tunisia; Clay $25,000; Singles and doubles draws	(Tunisia) Ons Jabeur; 6–3, 7–6^{(7–4)}	(Russia) Valeria Savinykh	(Liechtenstein) Kathinka von Deichmann (Spain) Beatriz García Vidagany	(Russia) Marina Melnikova (Netherlands) Lesley Kerkhove (United Kingdom) Amanda Carreras (France) Stéphanie Foretz Gacon
May 5	Tunis, Tunisia; Clay $25,000; Singles and doubles draws	(Venezuela) Andrea Gámiz (Russia) Valeria Savinykh; 6–4, 6–1	(Spain) Beatriz García Vidagany (Russia) Marina Melnikova	(Liechtenstein) Kathinka von Deichmann (Spain) Beatriz García Vidagany	(Russia) Marina Melnikova (Netherlands) Lesley Kerkhove (United Kingdom) Amanda Carreras (France) Stéphanie Foretz Gacon
May 5	RBC Bank Women's Challenger; Raleigh, United States; Clay $25,000; Singles and doubles draws	(Canada) Heidi El Tabakh; 6–3, 6–4	(United States) Maria Sanchez	(United States) Samantha Crawford (Ukraine) Sofiya Kovalets	(United States) Alexandra Mueller (United States) Brooke Austin (Czech Republic) Kateřina Kramperová (Belgium) Elise Mertens
May 5	RBC Bank Women's Challenger; Raleigh, United States; Clay $25,000; Singles and doubles draws	(Chinese Taipei) Hsu Chieh-yu (United States) Alexandra Mueller; 6–3, 6–3	(United States) Danielle Lao (United States) Keri Wong	(United States) Samantha Crawford (Ukraine) Sofiya Kovalets	(United States) Alexandra Mueller (United States) Brooke Austin (Czech Republic) Kateřina Kramperová (Belgium) Elise Mertens
May 5	Bol, Croatia; Clay $10,000; Singles and doubles draws	(Switzerland) Lara Michel; 6–3, 6–3	(Croatia) Adrijana Lekaj	(Romania) Patricia Maria Țig (Croatia) Iva Mekovec	(Croatia) Ema Mikulčić (Germany) Stefanie Vorih (Romania) Irina Maria Bara (Switzerland) Imane Maëlle Kocher
May 5	Bol, Croatia; Clay $10,000; Singles and doubles draws	(Czech Republic) Pernilla Mendesová (Romania) Patricia Maria Țig; Walkover	(Romania) Irina Maria Bara (Romania) Raluca Elena Platon	(Romania) Patricia Maria Țig (Croatia) Iva Mekovec	(Croatia) Ema Mikulčić (Germany) Stefanie Vorih (Romania) Irina Maria Bara (Switzerland) Imane Maëlle Kocher
May 5	Sharm el-Sheikh, Egypt; Hard $10,000; Singles and doubles draws	(United Kingdom) Katie Boulter; 4–6, 6–4, 7–5	(United Kingdom) Eden Silva	(Russia) Ekaterina Tretyak (Russia) Liudmila Vasilyeva	(Russia) Polina Leykina (Kazakhstan) Alexandra Grinchishina (United Kingdom) Francesca Stephenson (Serbia) Teodora Radosavljević
May 5	Sharm el-Sheikh, Egypt; Hard $10,000; Singles and doubles draws	(United Kingdom) Katie Boulter (Serbia) Nina Stojanović; 6–2, 6–3	(Kazakhstan) Ekaterina Klyueva (Russia) Sofia Smagina	(Russia) Ekaterina Tretyak (Russia) Liudmila Vasilyeva	(Russia) Polina Leykina (Kazakhstan) Alexandra Grinchishina (United Kingdom) Francesca Stephenson (Serbia) Teodora Radosavljević
May 5	Hyderabad, India; Hard $10,000; Singles and doubles draws	(India) Prarthana Thombare; 6–7^{(4–7)}, 6–4, 6–3	(India) Rishika Sunkara	(India) Natasha Palha (India) Nidhi Chilumula	(India) Amrita Mukherjee (India) Eetee Maheta (India) Bhuvana Kalva (India) Shweta Rana
May 5	Hyderabad, India; Hard $10,000; Singles and doubles draws	(India) Sharmada Balu (India) Rishika Sunkara; 6–1, 7–5	(India) Shweta Rana (India) Prarthana Thombare	(India) Natasha Palha (India) Nidhi Chilumula	(India) Amrita Mukherjee (India) Eetee Maheta (India) Bhuvana Kalva (India) Shweta Rana
May 5	Santa Margherita di Pula, Italy; Clay $10,000; Singles and doubles draws	(Romania) Diana Buzean; 6–2, 6–7^{(7–9)}, 6–0	(Canada) Gloria Liang	(Dominican Republic) Francesca Segarelli (Germany) Luisa Marie Huber	(Italy) Giorgia Marchetti (Poland) Natalia Siedliska (Switzerland) Tess Sugnaux (Italy) Giada Clerici
May 5	Santa Margherita di Pula, Italy; Clay $10,000; Singles and doubles draws	(Italy) Federica Arcidiacono (Italy) Martina Spigarelli; 6–1, 6–4	(Germany) Luisa Marie Huber (Poland) Natalia Siedliska	(Dominican Republic) Francesca Segarelli (Germany) Luisa Marie Huber	(Italy) Giorgia Marchetti (Poland) Natalia Siedliska (Switzerland) Tess Sugnaux (Italy) Giada Clerici
May 5	Båstad, Sweden; Clay $10,000; Singles and doubles draws	(Switzerland) Conny Perrin; 7–5, 6–1	(Greece) Maria Sakkari	(Germany) Carolin Daniels (Ukraine) Olga Ianchuk	(Denmark) Karen Barbat (Denmark) Malene Stripp (Sweden) Kajsa Rinaldo Persson (Japan) Natsumi Chimura
May 5	Båstad, Sweden; Clay $10,000; Singles and doubles draws	(Germany) Kim Grajdek (Greece) Maria Sakkari; 7–5, 6–4	(Bosnia and Herzegovina) Dea Herdželaš (Switzerland) Conny Perrin	(Germany) Carolin Daniels (Ukraine) Olga Ianchuk	(Denmark) Karen Barbat (Denmark) Malene Stripp (Sweden) Kajsa Rinaldo Persson (Japan) Natsumi Chimura
May 5	Bangkok, Thailand; Hard $10,000; Singles and doubles draws	(China) Xun Fangying; 6–3, 6–4	(Norway) Emma Flood	(Netherlands) Mandy Wagemaker (Thailand) Varunya Wongteanchai	(Japan) Shiho Hisamatsu (Chinese Taipei) Lee Hua-chen (Japan) Hirono Watanabe (Belgium) India Maggen
May 5	Bangkok, Thailand; Hard $10,000; Singles and doubles draws	(Thailand) Nungnadda Wannasuk (Thailand) Varunya Wongteanchai; 6–2, 7–5	(Japan) Kyōka Okamura (Japan) Hirono Watanabe	(Netherlands) Mandy Wagemaker (Thailand) Varunya Wongteanchai	(Japan) Shiho Hisamatsu (Chinese Taipei) Lee Hua-chen (Japan) Hirono Watanabe (Belgium) India Maggen
May 5	Antalya, Turkey; Hard $10,000; Singles and doubles draws	(Mexico) Marcela Zacarías; 6–3, ret.	(Ukraine) Alyona Sotnikova	(Serbia) Barbara Bonić (Romania) Cristina Ene	(Russia) Daria Afanasyeva (Mexico) Ximena Hermoso (Mexico) Victoria Rodríguez (Bulgaria) Julia Stamatova
May 5	Antalya, Turkey; Hard $10,000; Singles and doubles draws	(Mexico) Victoria Rodríguez (Mexico) Marcela Zacarías; 6–1, 1–6, [10–4]	(United States) Alexa Guarachi (United States) Kate Turvy	(Serbia) Barbara Bonić (Romania) Cristina Ene	(Russia) Daria Afanasyeva (Mexico) Ximena Hermoso (Mexico) Victoria Rodríguez (Bulgaria) Julia Stamatova
May 12	Sparta Prague Open; Prague, Czech Republic; Clay $100,000+H; Singles – Doubles	(United Kingdom) Heather Watson; 7–6^{(7–5)}, 6–0	(Slovakia) Anna Karolína Schmiedlová	(Serbia) Aleksandra Krunić (Hungary) Tímea Babos	(United States) Melanie Oudin (Japan) Misaki Doi (Czech Republic) Tereza Smitková (Czech Republic) Karolína Plíšková
May 12	Sparta Prague Open; Prague, Czech Republic; Clay $100,000+H; Singles – Doubles	(Czech Republic) Lucie Hradecká (Netherlands) Michaëlla Krajicek; 6–3, 6–2	(Czech Republic) Andrea Hlaváčková (Czech Republic) Lucie Šafářová	(Serbia) Aleksandra Krunić (Hungary) Tímea Babos	(United States) Melanie Oudin (Japan) Misaki Doi (Czech Republic) Tereza Smitková (Czech Republic) Karolína Plíšková
May 12	Open Saint-Gaudens Midi-Pyrénées; Saint-Gaudens, France; Clay $50,000+H; Singles – Doubles	(Montenegro) Danka Kovinić; 6–1, 6–2	(France) Pauline Parmentier	(Croatia) Ana Konjuh (United Kingdom) Johanna Konta	(Italy) Alberta Brianti (France) Claire Feuerstein (Peru) Bianca Botto (Russia) Marta Sirotkina
May 12	Open Saint-Gaudens Midi-Pyrénées; Saint-Gaudens, France; Clay $50,000+H; Singles – Doubles	(Paraguay) Verónica Cepede Royg (Argentina) María Irigoyen; 7–5, 6–3	(Canada) Sharon Fichman (United Kingdom) Johanna Konta	(Croatia) Ana Konjuh (United Kingdom) Johanna Konta	(Italy) Alberta Brianti (France) Claire Feuerstein (Peru) Bianca Botto (Russia) Marta Sirotkina
May 12	Kurume Best Amenity Cup; Kurume, Japan; Grass $50,000; Singles – Doubles	(China) Wang Qiang; 6–3, 6–1	(Japan) Eri Hozumi	(Australia) Arina Rodionova (Japan) Nao Hibino	(Japan) Miharu Imanishi (Japan) Mari Tanaka (Japan) Naomi Osaka (Australia) Jarmila Gajdošová
May 12	Kurume Best Amenity Cup; Kurume, Japan; Grass $50,000; Singles – Doubles	(Australia) Jarmila Gajdošová (Australia) Arina Rodionova; 6–4, 6–2	(Japan) Junri Namigata (Japan) Akiko Yonemura	(Australia) Arina Rodionova (Japan) Nao Hibino	(Japan) Miharu Imanishi (Japan) Mari Tanaka (Japan) Naomi Osaka (Australia) Jarmila Gajdošová
May 12	Bol, Croatia; Clay $10,000; Singles and doubles draws	(Switzerland) Lara Michel; 6–4, 6–3	(Bulgaria) Viktoriya Tomova	(United States) Bernarda Pera (Russia) Eugeniya Pashkova	(Switzerland) Imane Maëlle Kocher (Romania) Patricia Maria Țig (Slovenia) Natalija Šipek (Serbia) Milana Špremo
May 12	Bol, Croatia; Clay $10,000; Singles and doubles draws	(Croatia) Ema Mikulčić (Bulgaria) Viktoriya Tomova; 6–3, 6–1	(Belgium) Justine De Sutter (Netherlands) Monique Zuur	(United States) Bernarda Pera (Russia) Eugeniya Pashkova	(Switzerland) Imane Maëlle Kocher (Romania) Patricia Maria Țig (Slovenia) Natalija Šipek (Serbia) Milana Špremo
May 12	Sharm el-Sheikh, Egypt; Hard $10,000; Singles and doubles draws	(Russia) Polina Leykina; 6–2, 2–6, 6–2	(Serbia) Nina Stojanović	(Russia) Anastasiya Saitova (Switzerland) Lisa Sabino	(India) Nidhi Chilumula (Poland) Agata Barańska (Kazakhstan) Alexandra Grinchishina (Japan) Yui Saikai
May 12	Sharm el-Sheikh, Egypt; Hard $10,000; Singles and doubles draws	(Switzerland) Lisa Sabino (Serbia) Nina Stojanović; 6–3, 4–6, [10–3]	(United Kingdom) Lucy Brown (Russia) Polina Leykina	(Russia) Anastasiya Saitova (Switzerland) Lisa Sabino	(India) Nidhi Chilumula (Poland) Agata Barańska (Kazakhstan) Alexandra Grinchishina (Japan) Yui Saikai
May 12	Acre, Israel; Hard $10,000; Singles and doubles draws	(Russia) Anastasia Pribylova; 6–2, 6–4	(Israel) Saray Sterenbach	(Ukraine) Oleksandra Piskun (Germany) Michaela Frlicka	(Israel) Avital Vaysbuch (France) Fiona Codino (Israel) Alona Puskkarevsky (Russia) Alina Silich
May 12	Acre, Israel; Hard $10,000; Singles and doubles draws	(Israel) Saray Sterenbach (Israel) Talya Zandberg; 6–4, 6–3	(Germany) Michaela Frlicka (Russia) Margarita Lazareva	(Ukraine) Oleksandra Piskun (Germany) Michaela Frlicka	(Israel) Avital Vaysbuch (France) Fiona Codino (Israel) Alona Puskkarevsky (Russia) Alina Silich
May 12	Santa Margherita di Pula, Italy; Clay $10,000; Singles and doubles draws	(Colombia) Yuliana Lizarazo; 6–2, 6–1	(Switzerland) Tess Sugnaux	(Canada) Gloria Liang (Chile) Andrea Koch Benvenuto	(Romania) Diana Buzean (Dominican Republic) Francesca Segarelli (Italy) Alice Matteucci (Italy) Martina Caregaro
May 12	Santa Margherita di Pula, Italy; Clay $10,000; Singles and doubles draws	(Colombia) Yuliana Lizarazo (Italy) Alice Matteucci; 6–1, 7–5	(Argentina) Carla Lucero (Dominican Republic) Francesca Segarelli	(Canada) Gloria Liang (Chile) Andrea Koch Benvenuto	(Romania) Diana Buzean (Dominican Republic) Francesca Segarelli (Italy) Alice Matteucci (Italy) Martina Caregaro
May 12	Zielona Góra, Poland; Clay $10,000; Singles and doubles draws	(Russia) Natela Dzalamidze; 7–6^{(7–5)}, 6–4	(Germany) Justine Ozga	(Bulgaria) Isabella Shinikova (Ukraine) Anastasiya Shoshyna	(Slovakia) Vivien Juhászová (Belarus) Sviatlana Pirazhenka (Poland) Magdalena Fręch (Czech Republic) Barbora Štefková
May 12	Zielona Góra, Poland; Clay $10,000; Singles and doubles draws	(Russia) Natela Dzalamidze (Poland) Natalia Siedliska; 6–4, 6–1	(Romania) Ana Bianca Mihăilă (Belarus) Sviatlana Pirazhenka	(Bulgaria) Isabella Shinikova (Ukraine) Anastasiya Shoshyna	(Slovakia) Vivien Juhászová (Belarus) Sviatlana Pirazhenka (Poland) Magdalena Fręch (Czech Republic) Barbora Štefková
May 12	Monzón, Spain; Hard $10,000; Singles and doubles draws	(Austria) Janina Toljan; 6–3, 5–7, 6–0	(Spain) María José Luque Moreno	(Spain) Olga Sáez Larra (Italy) Giulia Sussarello	(Spain) Irene Burillo Escorihuela (Spain) Ariadna Martí Riembau (Moldova) Cristina Bucșa (France) Jessika Ponchet
May 12	Monzón, Spain; Hard $10,000; Singles and doubles draws	(Spain) Ariadna Martí Riembau (Spain) Marta Sexmilo Pascual; 4–6, 6–4, [10–5]	(Italy) Giulia Sussarello (Austria) Janina Toljan	(Spain) Olga Sáez Larra (Italy) Giulia Sussarello	(Spain) Irene Burillo Escorihuela (Spain) Ariadna Martí Riembau (Moldova) Cristina Bucșa (France) Jessika Ponchet
May 12	Båstad, Sweden; Clay $10,000; Singles and doubles draws	(Greece) Maria Sakkari; 7–5, 6–2	(Germany) Carolin Daniels	(Bosnia and Herzegovina) Dea Herdželaš (Germany) Christina Shakovets	(Sweden) Beatrice Cedermark (Slovakia) Zuzana Luknárová (Sweden) Hilda Melander (Sweden) Brenda Njuki
May 12	Båstad, Sweden; Clay $10,000; Singles and doubles draws	(Germany) Carolin Daniels (Ukraine) Olga Ianchuk; 6–4, 6–3	(Russia) Anna Smolina (Russia) Liubov Vasilyeva	(Bosnia and Herzegovina) Dea Herdželaš (Germany) Christina Shakovets	(Sweden) Beatrice Cedermark (Slovakia) Zuzana Luknárová (Sweden) Hilda Melander (Sweden) Brenda Njuki
May 12	Sousse, Tunisia; Hard $10,000; Singles and doubles draws	(Mexico) Ana Sofía Sánchez; 6–1, 6–2	(Spain) Nuria Párrizas Díaz	(France) Margot Decker (Slovakia) Chantal Škamlová	(Italy) Giorgia Pinto (Greece) Stamatia Fafaliou (United Kingdom) Harriet Dart (United States) Eva Raszkiewicz
May 12	Sousse, Tunisia; Hard $10,000; Singles and doubles draws	(Slovakia) Chantal Škamlová (Russia) Avgusta Tsybysheva; 6–3, 6–2	(Spain) Olga Parres Azcoitia (Spain) Nuria Párrizas Díaz	(France) Margot Decker (Slovakia) Chantal Škamlová	(Italy) Giorgia Pinto (Greece) Stamatia Fafaliou (United Kingdom) Harriet Dart (United States) Eva Raszkiewicz
May 12	Antalya, Turkey; Hard $10,000; Singles and doubles draws	(France) Océane Dodin; 4–6, 6–4, 6–3	(United States) Alexa Guarachi	(Serbia) Barbara Bonić (Romania) Daiana Negreanu	(Ukraine) Olena Kyrpot (Japan) Kanami Tsuji (Mexico) Ximena Hermoso (Italy) Francesca Palmigiano
May 12	Antalya, Turkey; Hard $10,000; Singles and doubles draws	(United States) Alexa Guarachi (United States) Kate Turvy; 6–3, 7–6^{(10–8)}	(Serbia) Barbara Bonić (Mexico) Ximena Hermoso	(Serbia) Barbara Bonić (Romania) Daiana Negreanu	(Ukraine) Olena Kyrpot (Japan) Kanami Tsuji (Mexico) Ximena Hermoso (Italy) Francesca Palmigiano
May 19	Tianjin Health Industry Park; Tianjin, China; Hard $25,000; Singles and doubles draws	(China) Wang Qiang; 6–3, 6–2	(China) Zhu Lin	(Oman) Fatma Al-Nabhani (China) Yang Zhaoxuan	(Hong Kong) Zhang Ling (Thailand) Nudnida Luangnam (India) Ankita Raina (China) Liu Fangzhou
May 19	Tianjin Health Industry Park; Tianjin, China; Hard $25,000; Singles and doubles draws	(China) Liu Chang (China) Tian Ran; 6–1, 7–5	(Oman) Fatma Al-Nabhani (India) Ankita Raina	(Oman) Fatma Al-Nabhani (China) Yang Zhaoxuan	(Hong Kong) Zhang Ling (Thailand) Nudnida Luangnam (India) Ankita Raina (China) Liu Fangzhou
May 19	Karuizawa, Japan; Grass $25,000; Singles and doubles draws	(South Korea) Jang Su-jeong; 6–3, 6–4	(Australia) Arina Rodionova	(United Kingdom) Tara Moore (Belgium) Ysaline Bonaventure	(Japan) Yumi Miyazaki (Australia) Monique Adamczak (Japan) Rika Fujiwara (Japan) Chiaki Okadaue
May 19	Karuizawa, Japan; Grass $25,000; Singles and doubles draws	(Japan) Junri Namigata (Japan) Akiko Yonemura; 6–2, 7–5	(Japan) Kanae Hisami (Japan) Chiaki Okadaue	(United Kingdom) Tara Moore (Belgium) Ysaline Bonaventure	(Japan) Yumi Miyazaki (Australia) Monique Adamczak (Japan) Rika Fujiwara (Japan) Chiaki Okadaue
May 19	Bol, Croatia; Clay $10,000; Singles and doubles draws	(Romania) Patricia Maria Țig; 6–2, 7–5	(Croatia) Tena Lukas	(Sweden) Beatrice Cedermark (Croatia) Ema Mikulčić	(Hungary) Szabina Szlavikovics (Belgium) Justine De Sutter (Russia) Eugeniya Pashkova (Germany) Christina Shakovets
May 19	Bol, Croatia; Clay $10,000; Singles and doubles draws	(Finland) Emma Laine (Russia) Eugeniya Pashkova; 6–4, 6–0	(Ukraine) Olga Ianchuk (Germany) Christina Shakovets	(Sweden) Beatrice Cedermark (Croatia) Ema Mikulčić	(Hungary) Szabina Szlavikovics (Belgium) Justine De Sutter (Russia) Eugeniya Pashkova (Germany) Christina Shakovets
May 19	Sharm el-Sheikh, Egypt; Hard $10,000; Singles and doubles draws	(Russia) Anastasiya Saitova; 6–3, 6–2	(Japan) Yuriko Miyazaki	(Egypt) Ola Abou Zekry (India) Nidhi Chilumula	(Russia) Anna Morgina (Sweden) Susanne Celik (Greece) Eleni Kordolaimi (Romania) Elena-Teodora Cadar
May 19	Sharm el-Sheikh, Egypt; Hard $10,000; Singles and doubles draws	(Romania) Elena-Teodora Cadar (Russia) Anna Morgina; 3–6, 6–2, [10–5]	(Ukraine) Diana Bogoliy (India) Nidhi Chilumula	(Egypt) Ola Abou Zekry (India) Nidhi Chilumula	(Russia) Anna Morgina (Sweden) Susanne Celik (Greece) Eleni Kordolaimi (Romania) Elena-Teodora Cadar
May 19	Ramla, Israel; Hard $10,000; Singles and doubles draws	(Czech Republic) Barbora Štefková; 6–1, 6–3	(Russia) Margarita Lazareva	(Georgia (country)) Mariam Bolkvadze (Israel) Saray Sterenbach	(France) Amandine Cazeaux (Russia) Anastasia Pribylova (United Kingdom) Manisha Foster (Bulgaria) Julia Stamatova
May 19	Ramla, Israel; Hard $10,000; Singles and doubles draws	(Russia) Margarita Lazareva (Czech Republic) Barbora Štefková; 6–2, 3–6, [11–9]	(Russia) Sofia Dmitrieva (United States) Alexandra Morozova	(Georgia (country)) Mariam Bolkvadze (Israel) Saray Sterenbach	(France) Amandine Cazeaux (Russia) Anastasia Pribylova (United Kingdom) Manisha Foster (Bulgaria) Julia Stamatova
May 19	Caserta, Italy; Clay $10,000; Singles and doubles draws	(Bulgaria) Isabella Shinikova; 4–6, 6–3, 6–4	(Ukraine) Marianna Zakarlyuk	(Germany) Anne Schäfer (Georgia (country)) Ekaterine Gorgodze	(Russia) Marina Shamayko (Italy) Martina Trevisan (Brazil) Beatriz Haddad Maia (Chile) Andrea Koch Benvenuto
May 19	Caserta, Italy; Clay $10,000; Singles and doubles draws	(Australia) Samantha Harris (Australia) Sally Peers; 6–3, 7–6^{(8–6)}	(Georgia (country)) Ekaterine Gorgodze (Georgia (country)) Sofia Kvatsabaia	(Germany) Anne Schäfer (Georgia (country)) Ekaterine Gorgodze	(Russia) Marina Shamayko (Italy) Martina Trevisan (Brazil) Beatriz Haddad Maia (Chile) Andrea Koch Benvenuto
May 19	Velenje, Slovenia; Clay $10,000; Singles and doubles draws	(Slovenia) Tamara Zidanšek; 4–6, 6–2, 6–3	(Austria) Barbara Haas	(Croatia) Silvia Njirić (Austria) Yvonne Neuwirth	(Czech Republic) Karolína Stuchlá (Slovakia) Petra Uberalová (Czech Republic) Martina Kubičíková (Slovakia) Nikola Vajdová
May 19	Velenje, Slovenia; Clay $10,000; Singles and doubles draws	(Czech Republic) Lenka Kunčíková (Czech Republic) Karolína Stuchlá; 7–5, 6–1	(Czech Republic) Martina Kubičíková (Czech Republic) Tereza Malíková	(Croatia) Silvia Njirić (Austria) Yvonne Neuwirth	(Czech Republic) Karolína Stuchlá (Slovakia) Petra Uberalová (Czech Republic) Martina Kubičíková (Slovakia) Nikola Vajdová
May 19	Sousse, Tunisia; Hard $10,000; Singles and doubles draws	(Slovakia) Chantal Škamlová; 7–6^{(7–3)}, 4–6, 6–4	(France) Lou Brouleau	(Portugal) Mafalda Fernandes (Mexico) Ana Sofía Sánchez	(Spain) Olaya Inclán Solís (United Kingdom) Harriet Dart (Germany) Linda Prenkovic (Serbia) Bojana Marinković
May 19	Sousse, Tunisia; Hard $10,000; Singles and doubles draws	(Australia) Alexandra Nancarrow (Spain) Olga Parres Azcoitia; 6–4, 6–2	(Mexico) Ana Sofía Sánchez (Slovakia) Chantal Škamlová	(Portugal) Mafalda Fernandes (Mexico) Ana Sofía Sánchez	(Spain) Olaya Inclán Solís (United Kingdom) Harriet Dart (Germany) Linda Prenkovic (Serbia) Bojana Marinković
May 19	Antalya, Turkey; Hard $10,000; Singles and doubles draws	(Austria) Janina Toljan; 6–7^{(5–7)}, 6–4, 6–4	(Romania) Daiana Negreanu	(Germany) Charlotte Klasen (Mexico) Ximena Hermoso	(Turkey) Melis Sezer (Ukraine) Alona Fomina (United States) Kate Turvy (Italy) Francesca Palmigiano
May 19	Antalya, Turkey; Hard $10,000; Singles and doubles draws	(Bosnia and Herzegovina) Anita Husarić (Italy) Francesca Palmigiano; Walkover	(Mexico) Ximena Hermoso (Romania) Daiana Negreanu	(Germany) Charlotte Klasen (Mexico) Ximena Hermoso	(Turkey) Melis Sezer (Ukraine) Alona Fomina (United States) Kate Turvy (Italy) Francesca Palmigiano
May 19	Sumter, United States; Hard $10,000; Singles and doubles draws	(United States) Brooke Austin; 7–6^{(7–5)}, 2–6, 6–1	(United States) Nadja Gilchrist	(United States) Caitlin Whoriskey (Canada) Petra Januskova	(Ukraine) Kateryna Yergina (United States) Kristina Smith (United States) Josie Kuhlman (United States) Anne-Liz Jeukeng
May 19	Sumter, United States; Hard $10,000; Singles and doubles draws	(United States) Sophie Chang (United States) Andie Daniell; 6–1, 6–3	(Canada) Sonja Molnar (United States) Caitlin Whoriskey	(United States) Caitlin Whoriskey (Canada) Petra Januskova	(Ukraine) Kateryna Yergina (United States) Kristina Smith (United States) Josie Kuhlman (United States) Anne-Liz Jeukeng
May 26	Zhengzhou, China; Hard $25,000; Singles and doubles draws	(China) Zhang Kailin; 7–5, 6–4	(China) Xu Yifan	(China) Hu Yueyue (Australia) Jessica Moore	(China) Wang Qiang (China) Yang Zi (China) Yang Zhaoxuan (China) Liu Chang
May 26	Zhengzhou, China; Hard $25,000; Singles and doubles draws	(Chinese Taipei) Chan Chin-wei (China) Liang Chen; 6–3, 6–3	(China) Han Xinyun (China) Zhang Kailin	(China) Hu Yueyue (Australia) Jessica Moore	(China) Wang Qiang (China) Yang Zi (China) Yang Zhaoxuan (China) Liu Chang
May 26	Balikpapan, Indonesia; Hard $25,000; Singles and doubles draws	(China) Zhu Lin; 7–5, 2–6, 6–3	(India) Ankita Raina	(Japan) Miyabi Inoue (Thailand) Varatchaya Wongteanchai	(Thailand) Nicha Lertpitaksinchai (Thailand) Peangtarn Plipuech (Serbia) Barbara Bonić (Indonesia) Deria Nur Haliza
May 26	Balikpapan, Indonesia; Hard $25,000; Singles and doubles draws	(Japan) Michika Ozeki (Thailand) Peangtarn Plipuech; 6–3, 4–6, [10–7]	(Thailand) Varatchaya Wongteanchai (Thailand) Varunya Wongteanchai	(Japan) Miyabi Inoue (Thailand) Varatchaya Wongteanchai	(Thailand) Nicha Lertpitaksinchai (Thailand) Peangtarn Plipuech (Serbia) Barbara Bonić (Indonesia) Deria Nur Haliza
May 26	Grado, Italy; Clay $25,000; Singles and doubles draws	(Italy) Gioia Barbieri; 6–4, 4–6, 6–4	(Ukraine) Kateryna Kozlova	(Liechtenstein) Stephanie Vogt (United States) Samantha Crawford	(Italy) Maria Elena Camerin (Italy) Alberta Brianti (Argentina) Florencia Molinero (Netherlands) Indy de Vroome
May 26	Grado, Italy; Clay $25,000; Singles and doubles draws	(Paraguay) Verónica Cepede Royg (Liechtenstein) Stephanie Vogt; 6–4, 6–2	(Spain) Lara Arruabarrena (Argentina) Florencia Molinero	(Liechtenstein) Stephanie Vogt (United States) Samantha Crawford	(Italy) Maria Elena Camerin (Italy) Alberta Brianti (Argentina) Florencia Molinero (Netherlands) Indy de Vroome
May 26	Moscow, Russia; Clay $25,000; Singles and doubles draws	(Ukraine) Anastasiya Vasylyeva; 7–5, 6–4	(Russia) Vitalia Diatchenko	(Switzerland) Xenia Knoll (Russia) Margarita Gasparyan	(Russia) Ekaterina Bychkova (Czech Republic) Tereza Martincová (Russia) Mayya Katsitadze (Russia) Evgeniya Rodina
May 26	Moscow, Russia; Clay $25,000; Singles and doubles draws	(Kazakhstan) Anna Danilina (Switzerland) Xenia Knoll; 6–3, 6–2	(Russia) Ekaterina Bychkova (Russia) Evgeniya Rodina	(Switzerland) Xenia Knoll (Russia) Margarita Gasparyan	(Russia) Ekaterina Bychkova (Czech Republic) Tereza Martincová (Russia) Mayya Katsitadze (Russia) Evgeniya Rodina
May 26	Infond Open; Maribor, Slovenia; Clay $25,000; Singles and doubles draws	(Czech Republic) Kateřina Siniaková; 6–1, 7–5	(Austria) Yvonne Neuwirth	(Canada) Françoise Abanda (Paraguay) Montserrat González	(Czech Republic) Barbora Krejčíková (Russia) Ekaterina Alexandrova (Slovenia) Tamara Zidanšek (Serbia) Ivana Jorović
May 26	Infond Open; Maribor, Slovenia; Clay $25,000; Singles and doubles draws	(Czech Republic) Barbora Krejčíková (Czech Republic) Kateřina Siniaková; 6–0, 6–1	(Netherlands) Cindy Burger (Chile) Daniela Seguel	(Canada) Françoise Abanda (Paraguay) Montserrat González	(Czech Republic) Barbora Krejčíková (Russia) Ekaterina Alexandrova (Slovenia) Tamara Zidanšek (Serbia) Ivana Jorović
May 26	Changwon, South Korea; Hard $25,000; Singles and doubles draws	(South Korea) Hong Hyun-hui; 2–6, 6–4, 6–3	(Japan) Junri Namigata	(Japan) Mari Tanaka (South Korea) Jang Su-jeong	(Japan) Nao Hibino (South Korea) Yoo Mi (South Korea) Hong Seung-yeon (South Korea) Choi Ji-hee
May 26	Changwon, South Korea; Hard $25,000; Singles and doubles draws	(Chinese Taipei) Chuang Chia-jung (Japan) Junri Namigata; 7–6^{(7–5)}, 6–0	(South Korea) Kim So-jung (South Korea) Lee Ye-ra	(Japan) Mari Tanaka (South Korea) Jang Su-jeong	(Japan) Nao Hibino (South Korea) Yoo Mi (South Korea) Hong Seung-yeon (South Korea) Choi Ji-hee
May 26	Bukhara, Uzbekistan; Hard $25,000; Singles and doubles draws	(Uzbekistan) Akgul Amanmuradova; 6–3, 7–5	(Ukraine) Veronika Kapshay	(Uzbekistan) Nigina Abduraimova (Uzbekistan) Sabina Sharipova	(Turkey) İpek Soylu (Georgia (country)) Ekaterine Gorgodze (Russia) Ekaterina Yashina (Russia) Margarita Lazareva
May 26	Bukhara, Uzbekistan; Hard $25,000; Singles and doubles draws	(Ukraine) Veronika Kapshay (Uzbekistan) Sabina Sharipova; 6–4, 6–4	(Uzbekistan) Nigina Abduraimova (Uzbekistan) Akgul Amanmuradova	(Uzbekistan) Nigina Abduraimova (Uzbekistan) Sabina Sharipova	(Turkey) İpek Soylu (Georgia (country)) Ekaterine Gorgodze (Russia) Ekaterina Yashina (Russia) Margarita Lazareva
May 26	Bol, Croatia; Clay $10,000; Singles and doubles draws	(Argentina) Nadia Podoroska; 6–1, 6–7^{(6–8)}, 6–1	(Peru) Bianca Botto	(Croatia) Tena Lukas (Australia) Samantha Harris	(Finland) Emma Laine (Czech Republic) Kateřina Kamínková (Sweden) Beatrice Cedermark (Italy) Sara Castellano
May 26	Bol, Croatia; Clay $10,000; Singles and doubles draws	(Peru) Bianca Botto (Finland) Emma Laine; 6–3, 6–3	(Czech Republic) Lenka Kunčíková (Czech Republic) Karolína Stuchlá	(Croatia) Tena Lukas (Australia) Samantha Harris	(Finland) Emma Laine (Czech Republic) Kateřina Kamínková (Sweden) Beatrice Cedermark (Italy) Sara Castellano
May 26	Sharm el-Sheikh, Egypt; Hard $10,000; Singles and doubles draws	(Sweden) Susanne Celik; 6–1, 6–2	(Egypt) Ola Abou Zekry	(United Kingdom) Danielle Konotoptseva (Romania) Elena-Teodora Cadar	(Republic of Ireland) Amy Bowtell (Egypt) Yasmin Hamza (India) Nidhi Chilumula (Greece) Eleni Kordolaimi
May 26	Sharm el-Sheikh, Egypt; Hard $10,000; Singles and doubles draws	(Sweden) Susanne Celik (Greece) Eleni Kordolaimi; 6–1, 7–6^{(7–2)}	(United Kingdom) Sabrina Bamburac (Spain) Arabela Fernández Rabener	(United Kingdom) Danielle Konotoptseva (Romania) Elena-Teodora Cadar	(Republic of Ireland) Amy Bowtell (Egypt) Yasmin Hamza (India) Nidhi Chilumula (Greece) Eleni Kordolaimi
May 26	Netanya, Israel; Hard $10,000; Singles and doubles draws	(Czech Republic) Barbora Štefková; 7–6^{(7–4)}, 6–3	(Israel) Saray Sterenbach	(Austria) Pia König (Bulgaria) Julia Stamatova	(Ukraine) Anna Bogoslavets (Israel) Talya Zandberg (Israel) Katya Krivoshapov (France) Amandine Cazeaux
May 26	Netanya, Israel; Hard $10,000; Singles and doubles draws	(Austria) Pia König (Czech Republic) Barbora Štefková; 6–3, 6–2	(Georgia (country)) Mariam Bolkvadze (Russia) Anastasia Pribylova	(Austria) Pia König (Bulgaria) Julia Stamatova	(Ukraine) Anna Bogoslavets (Israel) Talya Zandberg (Israel) Katya Krivoshapov (France) Amandine Cazeaux
May 26	Sibiu, Romania; Clay $10,000; Singles and doubles draws	(Romania) Patricia Maria Țig; 6–2, 6–4	(Romania) Nicoleta-Cătălina Dascălu	(Romania) Elena Bogdan (Romania) Gabriela Duca	(Romania) Iuliana Oante (Czech Republic) Vendula Žovincová (Romania) Iulia Maria Ivașcu (Romania) Andreea Amalia Roșca
May 26	Sibiu, Romania; Clay $10,000; Singles and doubles draws	(Romania) Camelia Hristea (Romania) Oana Georgeta Simion; 7–6^{(7–2)}, 6–1	(Romania) Raluca Georgiana Șerban (Czech Republic) Vendula Žovincová	(Romania) Elena Bogdan (Romania) Gabriela Duca	(Romania) Iuliana Oante (Czech Republic) Vendula Žovincová (Romania) Iulia Maria Ivașcu (Romania) Andreea Amalia Roșca
May 26	Sun City, South Africa; Hard $10,000; Singles and doubles draws	(South Africa) Michelle Sammons; 2–6, 7–5, 6–4	(South Africa) Natasha Fourouclas	(South Africa) Madrie Le Roux (Serbia) Vanja Klarić	(Bulgaria) Ani Vangelova (United States) Stephanie Kent (South Africa) Caitlin Herb (Germany) Amelie Intert
May 26	Sun City, South Africa; Hard $10,000; Singles and doubles draws	(South Africa) Michelle Sammons (South Africa) Chanel Simmonds; 7–5, 6–3	(South Africa) Ilze Hattingh (South Africa) Madrie Le Roux	(South Africa) Madrie Le Roux (Serbia) Vanja Klarić	(Bulgaria) Ani Vangelova (United States) Stephanie Kent (South Africa) Caitlin Herb (Germany) Amelie Intert
May 26	Sousse, Tunisia; Hard $10,000; Singles and doubles draws	(Mexico) Ana Sofía Sánchez; 6–3, 6–1	(North Macedonia) Lina Gjorcheska	(Spain) Nuria Párrizas Díaz (France) Caroline Roméo	(United Kingdom) Jazzamay Drew (Spain) Olga Parres Azcoitia (Serbia) Teodora Radosavljević (Australia) Alexandra Nancarrow
May 26	Sousse, Tunisia; Hard $10,000; Singles and doubles draws	(France) Lou Brouleau (France) Brandy Mina; 6–2, 2–6, [10–6]	(Australia) Alexandra Nancarrow (Spain) Olga Parres Azcoitia	(Spain) Nuria Párrizas Díaz (France) Caroline Roméo	(United Kingdom) Jazzamay Drew (Spain) Olga Parres Azcoitia (Serbia) Teodora Radosavljević (Australia) Alexandra Nancarrow
May 26	Tarsus, Turkey; Clay $10,000; Singles and doubles draws	(Russia) Anastasia Pivovarova; 6–1, 6–2	(Turkey) Melis Sezer	(Belgium) Kimberley Zimmermann (Germany) Charlotte Klasen	(Germany) Sina Niketta (Belgium) India Maggen (Bosnia and Herzegovina) Anita Husarić (Italy) Valeria Prosperi
May 26	Tarsus, Turkey; Clay $10,000; Singles and doubles draws	(Bosnia and Herzegovina) Anita Husarić (Belgium) Kimberley Zimmermann; 6–4, 6–2	(Russia) Anastasia Pivovarova (Turkey) Melis Sezer	(Belgium) Kimberley Zimmermann (Germany) Charlotte Klasen	(Germany) Sina Niketta (Belgium) India Maggen (Bosnia and Herzegovina) Anita Husarić (Italy) Valeria Prosperi
May 26	Hilton Head Island, United States; Hard $10,000; Singles and doubles draws	(United States) Caitlin Whoriskey; 6–3, 7–6^{(7–5)}	(Belgium) Elise Mertens	(United States) Caroline Dolehide (Ukraine) Elizaveta Ianchuk	(United States) Terri Fleming (Bosnia and Herzegovina) Ema Burgić (United States) Jan Abaza (Canada) Sonja Molnar
May 26	Hilton Head Island, United States; Hard $10,000; Singles and doubles draws	(Canada) Sonja Molnar (United States) Caitlin Whoriskey; 6–3, 6–4	(United States) Lauren Albanese (United States) Macall Harkins	(United States) Caroline Dolehide (Ukraine) Elizaveta Ianchuk	(United States) Terri Fleming (Bosnia and Herzegovina) Ema Burgić (United States) Jan Abaza (Canada) Sonja Molnar

=== June ===
Week of	Tournament	Winner	Runners-up	Semifinalists	Quarterfinalists
June 2	Open Féminin de Marseille; Marseille, France; Clay $100,000; Singles – Doubles	(Romania) Alexandra Dulgheru; 6–3, 7–5	(Sweden) Johanna Larsson	(United States) Allie Kiick (Russia) Evgeniya Rodina	(Spain) Lourdes Domínguez Lino (Sweden) Sofia Arvidsson (Kazakhstan) Sesil Karatantcheva (Ukraine) Lesia Tsurenko
June 2	Open Féminin de Marseille; Marseille, France; Clay $100,000; Singles – Doubles	(Spain) Lourdes Domínguez Lino (Spain) Beatriz García Vidagany; 6–1, 6–2	(Ukraine) Yuliya Beygelzimer (Ukraine) Olga Savchuk	(United States) Allie Kiick (Russia) Evgeniya Rodina	(Spain) Lourdes Domínguez Lino (Sweden) Sofia Arvidsson (Kazakhstan) Sesil Karatantcheva (Ukraine) Lesia Tsurenko
June 2	Aegon Trophy; Nottingham, United Kingdom; Grass $75,000; Singles – Doubles	(Czech Republic) Kristýna Plíšková; 6–2, 3–6, 6–4	(Kazakhstan) Zarina Diyas	(United Kingdom) Johanna Konta (Portugal) Michelle Larcher de Brito	(Estonia) Anett Kontaveit (Canada) Sharon Fichman (United States) Melanie Oudin (Greece) Eleni Daniilidou
June 2	Aegon Trophy; Nottingham, United Kingdom; Grass $75,000; Singles – Doubles	(United Kingdom) Jocelyn Rae (United Kingdom) Anna Smith; 7–6^{(7–5)}, 4–6, [10–5]	(Canada) Sharon Fichman (United States) Maria Sanchez	(United Kingdom) Johanna Konta (Portugal) Michelle Larcher de Brito	(Estonia) Anett Kontaveit (Canada) Sharon Fichman (United States) Melanie Oudin (Greece) Eleni Daniilidou
June 2	Brescia, Italy; Clay $25,000; Singles and doubles draws	(Belarus) Aliaksandra Sasnovich; 6–4, 6–1	(Czech Republic) Renata Voráčová	(Netherlands) Arantxa Rus (Czech Republic) Kateřina Siniaková	(United States) Samantha Crawford (Czech Republic) Eva Birnerová (Italy) Anna Remondina (Italy) Claudia Giovine
June 2	Brescia, Italy; Clay $25,000; Singles and doubles draws	(United States) Sanaz Marand (Argentina) Florencia Molinero; 6–4, 4–6, [10–8]	(United States) Louisa Chirico (United States) Asia Muhammad	(Netherlands) Arantxa Rus (Czech Republic) Kateřina Siniaková	(United States) Samantha Crawford (Czech Republic) Eva Birnerová (Italy) Anna Remondina (Italy) Claudia Giovine
June 2	La Marsa, Tunisia; Clay $25,000; Singles and doubles draws	(Venezuela) Andrea Gámiz; 3–6, 6–0, 6–4	(Croatia) Tereza Mrdeža	(Bulgaria) Dia Evtimova (Switzerland) Xenia Knoll	(Romania) Ana Bogdan (Croatia) Ana Savić (Spain) Sara Sorribes Tormo (Bulgaria) Isabella Shinikova
June 2	La Marsa, Tunisia; Clay $25,000; Singles and doubles draws	(Venezuela) Andrea Gámiz (Russia) Valeria Savinykh; 1–6, 7–6^{(8–6)}, [11–9]	(Switzerland) Xenia Knoll (Turkey) Pemra Özgen	(Bulgaria) Dia Evtimova (Switzerland) Xenia Knoll	(Romania) Ana Bogdan (Croatia) Ana Savić (Spain) Sara Sorribes Tormo (Bulgaria) Isabella Shinikova
June 2	El Paso, United States; Hard $25,000; Singles and doubles draws	(Belgium) Elise Mertens; 6–1, 3–6, 6–4	(United States) Ashley Weinhold	(Chinese Taipei) Hsu Chieh-yu (Bosnia and Herzegovina) Ema Burgić	(United States) Denise Muresan (United States) Chiara Scholl (Chinese Taipei) Hsu Ching-wen (United States) Peggy Porter
June 2	El Paso, United States; Hard $25,000; Singles and doubles draws	(United States) Jamie Loeb (United States) Ashley Weinhold; 4–6, 6–4, [15–13]	(Chinese Taipei) Hsu Chieh-yu (United States) Danielle Lao	(Chinese Taipei) Hsu Chieh-yu (Bosnia and Herzegovina) Ema Burgić	(United States) Denise Muresan (United States) Chiara Scholl (Chinese Taipei) Hsu Ching-wen (United States) Peggy Porter
June 2	Sarajevo, Bosnia and Herzegovina; Clay $15,000; Singles and doubles draws	(Bulgaria) Viktoriya Tomova; 6–4, 6–3	(United Kingdom) Eleanor Dean	(North Macedonia) Lina Gjorcheska (Czech Republic) Barbora Krejčíková	(Turkey) Melis Sezer (Serbia) Tamara Čurović (Switzerland) Conny Perrin (Greece) Despina Papamichail
June 2	Sarajevo, Bosnia and Herzegovina; Clay $15,000; Singles and doubles draws	(Czech Republic) Barbora Krejčíková (Bulgaria) Viktoriya Tomova; 7–6^{(7–3)}, 6–2	(Germany) Carolin Daniels (Turkey) Melis Sezer	(North Macedonia) Lina Gjorcheska (Czech Republic) Barbora Krejčíková	(Turkey) Melis Sezer (Serbia) Tamara Čurović (Switzerland) Conny Perrin (Greece) Despina Papamichail
June 2	Campos do Jordão, Brazil; Hard $15,000; Singles and doubles draws	(Brazil) Laura Pigossi; 4–6, 6–1, 7–6^{(7–2)}	(Argentina) Victoria Bosio	(Brazil) Nathália Rossi (Argentina) Guadalupe Pérez Rojas	(Brazil) Ana Clara Duarte (Chinese Taipei) Chien Pei-ju (Brazil) Nathaly Kurata (Paraguay) Sara Giménez
June 2	Campos do Jordão, Brazil; Hard $15,000; Singles and doubles draws	(Brazil) Laura Pigossi (Brazil) Nathália Rossi; 6–4, 6–2	(Argentina) Victoria Bosio (Brazil) Ana Clara Duarte	(Brazil) Nathália Rossi (Argentina) Guadalupe Pérez Rojas	(Brazil) Ana Clara Duarte (Chinese Taipei) Chien Pei-ju (Brazil) Nathaly Kurata (Paraguay) Sara Giménez
June 2	Bol, Croatia; Clay $10,000; Singles and doubles draws	(Peru) Bianca Botto; 6–1, 6–2	(Croatia) Tena Lukas	(Ukraine) Olga Ianchuk (Czech Republic) Petra Rohanová	(Argentina) Nadia Podoroska (Croatia) Mariana Dražić (Germany) Christina Shakovets (Slovakia) Barbara Kötelesová
June 2	Bol, Croatia; Clay $10,000; Singles and doubles draws	(Czech Republic) Lenka Kunčíková (Czech Republic) Karolína Stuchlá; 0–6, 6–1, [10–8]	(Ukraine) Olga Ianchuk (Germany) Christina Shakovets	(Ukraine) Olga Ianchuk (Czech Republic) Petra Rohanová	(Argentina) Nadia Podoroska (Croatia) Mariana Dražić (Germany) Christina Shakovets (Slovakia) Barbara Kötelesová
June 2	Sharm el-Sheikh, Egypt; Hard $10,000; Singles and doubles draws	(Romania) Elena-Teodora Cadar; 6–3, 6–3	(Republic of Ireland) Amy Bowtell	(Sweden) Susanne Celik (Norway) Caroline Rohde-Moe	(Russia) Alina Mikheeva (United Kingdom) Francesca Stephenson (Spain) Arabela Fernández Rabener (Greece) Eleni Kordolaimi
June 2	Sharm el-Sheikh, Egypt; Hard $10,000; Singles and doubles draws	(Sweden) Susanne Celik (Greece) Eleni Kordolaimi; 7–5, 6–2	(Romania) Elena-Teodora Cadar (Spain) Arabela Fernández Rabener	(Sweden) Susanne Celik (Norway) Caroline Rohde-Moe	(Russia) Alina Mikheeva (United Kingdom) Francesca Stephenson (Spain) Arabela Fernández Rabener (Greece) Eleni Kordolaimi
June 2	Budapest, Hungary; Clay $10,000; Singles and doubles draws	(Czech Republic) Pernilla Mendesová; 6–0, 2–6, 6–2	(Argentina) Sofía Blanco	(Russia) Eugeniya Pashkova (Romania) Nicoleta-Cătălina Dascălu	(Austria) Pia König (Slovakia) Lenka Juríková (Croatia) Adrijana Lekaj (Ukraine) Kateryna Bondarenko
June 2	Budapest, Hungary; Clay $10,000; Singles and doubles draws	(Argentina) Sofía Blanco (Croatia) Adrijana Lekaj; 7–6^{(7–5)}, 6–3	(Slovakia) Zuzana Luknárová (Russia) Eugeniya Pashkova	(Russia) Eugeniya Pashkova (Romania) Nicoleta-Cătălina Dascălu	(Austria) Pia König (Slovakia) Lenka Juríková (Croatia) Adrijana Lekaj (Ukraine) Kateryna Bondarenko
June 2	Tarakan, Indonesia; Hard (indoor) $10,000; Singles and doubles draws	(China) Zhu Lin; 4–6, 6–0, 6–2	(China) Wang Yan	(China) Yang Zhaoxuan (Indonesia) Lavinia Tananta	(Indonesia) Jessy Rompies (China) Zhang Yukun (Thailand) Tamachan Momkoonthod (Indonesia) Aldila Sutjiadi
June 2	Tarakan, Indonesia; Hard (indoor) $10,000; Singles and doubles draws	(Thailand) Varatchaya Wongteanchai (Thailand) Varunya Wongteanchai; 5–7, 6–4, [11–9]	(Indonesia) Beatrice Gumulya (Indonesia) Jessy Rompies	(China) Yang Zhaoxuan (Indonesia) Lavinia Tananta	(Indonesia) Jessy Rompies (China) Zhang Yukun (Thailand) Tamachan Momkoonthod (Indonesia) Aldila Sutjiadi
June 2	Tokyo, Japan; Hard $10,000; Singles and doubles draws	(Japan) Mana Ayukawa; 2–6, 6–0, 6–3	(Japan) Miyabi Inoue	(Japan) Yuuki Tanaka (Japan) Kotomi Takahata	(Japan) Kanae Hisami (Japan) Mizuno Kijima (Japan) Shiho Hisamatsu (Japan) Akari Inoue
June 2	Tokyo, Japan; Hard $10,000; Singles and doubles draws	(Japan) Mana Ayukawa (Japan) Makoto Ninomiya; 3–6, 6–4, [10–4]	(Japan) Yurina Koshino (Japan) Akiko Omae	(Japan) Yuuki Tanaka (Japan) Kotomi Takahata	(Japan) Kanae Hisami (Japan) Mizuno Kijima (Japan) Shiho Hisamatsu (Japan) Akari Inoue
June 2	Pachuca, Mexico; Hard $10,000; Singles and doubles draws	(Mexico) Carolina Betancourt; 5–3, ret.	(Chile) Fernanda Brito	(Russia) Anastasia Nefedova (Mexico) Adriana Guzmán	(Colombia) María Paulina Pérez (Russia) Vera Aleshcheva (United States) Rianna Valdes (Russia) Vera Bessonova
June 2	Pachuca, Mexico; Hard $10,000; Singles and doubles draws	(Russia) Vera Aleshcheva (Japan) Ayaka Okuno; 7–6^{(7–5)}, 3–6, [10–7]	(Mexico) Giovanna Manifacio (Mexico) Yadira Rubio	(Russia) Anastasia Nefedova (Mexico) Adriana Guzmán	(Colombia) María Paulina Pérez (Russia) Vera Aleshcheva (United States) Rianna Valdes (Russia) Vera Bessonova
June 2	Kazan Summer Cup; Kazan, Russia; Clay $10,000; Singles and doubles draws	(Russia) Alena Tarasova; 6–1, 7–6^{(7–3)}	(Russia) Polina Monova	(Russia) Margarita Lazareva (Belarus) Lidziya Marozava	(Russia) Anna Smolina (Russia) Anastasia Pivovarova (Russia) Julia Valetova (Russia) Sabina Shaydullina
June 2	Kazan Summer Cup; Kazan, Russia; Clay $10,000; Singles and doubles draws	(Russia) Margarita Lazareva (Belarus) Lidziya Marozava; 6–1, 0–6, [10–6]	(Russia) Polina Novoselova (Russia) Sofia Smagina	(Russia) Margarita Lazareva (Belarus) Lidziya Marozava	(Russia) Anna Smolina (Russia) Anastasia Pivovarova (Russia) Julia Valetova (Russia) Sabina Shaydullina
June 2	Sun City, South Africa; Hard $10,000; Singles and doubles draws	(South Africa) Ilze Hattingh; 6–1, 6–3	(France) Clothilde de Bernardi	(South Africa) Madrie Le Roux (South Africa) Natasha Fourouclas	(South Africa) Chanel Simmonds (Zimbabwe) Nicole Dzenga (United States) Stephanie Kent (South Africa) Lenice van Eyk
June 2	Sun City, South Africa; Hard $10,000; Singles and doubles draws	(Poland) Agata Barańska (United States) Stephanie Kent; Walkover	(South Africa) Ilze Hattingh (South Africa) Madrie Le Roux	(South Africa) Madrie Le Roux (South Africa) Natasha Fourouclas	(South Africa) Chanel Simmonds (Zimbabwe) Nicole Dzenga (United States) Stephanie Kent (South Africa) Lenice van Eyk
June 2	Madrid, Spain; Clay (indoor) $10,000; Singles and doubles draws	(Spain) Olga Sáez Larra; 6–4, 3–6, 7–5	(Spain) Lucía Cervera Vázquez	(Switzerland) Imane Maëlle Kocher (Spain) Yvonne Cavallé Reimers	(Germany) Lena-Marie Hofmann (Portugal) Bárbara Luz (Greece) Maria Sakkari (France) Jessika Ponchet
June 2	Madrid, Spain; Clay (indoor) $10,000; Singles and doubles draws	(Spain) Silvia García Jiménez (Spain) Olga Sáez Larra; 6–4, 6–3	(Spain) Yvonne Cavallé Reimers (Spain) Lucía Cervera Vázquez	(Switzerland) Imane Maëlle Kocher (Spain) Yvonne Cavallé Reimers	(Germany) Lena-Marie Hofmann (Portugal) Bárbara Luz (Greece) Maria Sakkari (France) Jessika Ponchet
June 2	Adana, Turkey; Hard $10,000; Singles and doubles draws	(Turkey) İpek Soylu; 4–6, 6–1, 6–2	(Turkey) Başak Eraydın	(Romania) Cristina Adamescu (Germany) Linda Prenkovic	(Ukraine) Alona Fomina (Turkey) Ayla Aksu (Australia) Pamela Boyanov (Turkey) Melis Bayraktaroğlu
June 2	Adana, Turkey; Hard $10,000; Singles and doubles draws	(Turkey) Başak Eraydın (Turkey) İpek Soylu; 6–3, 6–1	(Ukraine) Alona Fomina (Russia) Ekaterina Tsiklauri	(Romania) Cristina Adamescu (Germany) Linda Prenkovic	(Ukraine) Alona Fomina (Turkey) Ayla Aksu (Australia) Pamela Boyanov (Turkey) Melis Bayraktaroğlu
June 9	Aegon Nottingham Challenge; Nottingham, United Kingdom; Grass $50,000; Singles – Doubles	(Australia) Jarmila Gajdošová; 6–2, 6–2	(Switzerland) Timea Bacsinszky	(United States) Nicole Gibbs (Czech Republic) Andrea Hlaváčková	(Ukraine) Lesia Tsurenko (France) Mathilde Johansson (Estonia) Anett Kontaveit (Tunisia) Ons Jabeur
June 9	Aegon Nottingham Challenge; Nottingham, United Kingdom; Grass $50,000; Singles – Doubles	(Australia) Jarmila Gajdošová (Australia) Arina Rodionova; 7–6^{(7–0)}, 6–1	(Paraguay) Verónica Cepede Royg (Liechtenstein) Stephanie Vogt	(United States) Nicole Gibbs (Czech Republic) Andrea Hlaváčková	(Ukraine) Lesia Tsurenko (France) Mathilde Johansson (Estonia) Anett Kontaveit (Tunisia) Ons Jabeur
June 9	Essen, Germany; Clay $25,000; Singles and doubles draws	(Luxembourg) Mandy Minella; 6–2, 4–6, 6–3	(Netherlands) Richèl Hogenkamp	(France) Constance Sibille (Netherlands) Lesley Kerkhove	(Netherlands) Cindy Burger (Russia) Ekaterina Alexandrova (Germany) Kristina Barrois (Czech Republic) Kateřina Vaňková
June 9	Essen, Germany; Clay $25,000; Singles and doubles draws	(Germany) Kristina Barrois (Germany) Tatjana Maria; 6–2, 6–2	(Belgium) Ysaline Bonaventure (Bulgaria) Elitsa Kostova	(France) Constance Sibille (Netherlands) Lesley Kerkhove	(Netherlands) Cindy Burger (Russia) Ekaterina Alexandrova (Germany) Kristina Barrois (Czech Republic) Kateřina Vaňková
June 9	Budapest, Hungary; Clay $25,000; Singles and doubles draws	(Czech Republic) Denisa Allertová; 7–6^{(8–6)}, 7–6^{(7–3)}	(Croatia) Adrijana Lekaj	(Peru) Bianca Botto (Hungary) Réka-Luca Jani	(Russia) Eugeniya Pashkova (Czech Republic) Jesika Malečková (Bulgaria) Dia Evtimova (Croatia) Ana Savić
June 9	Budapest, Hungary; Clay $25,000; Singles and doubles draws	(Hungary) Réka-Luca Jani (Russia) Irina Khromacheva; 7–5, 6–4	(Slovenia) Dalila Jakupović (Czech Republic) Kateřina Kramperová	(Peru) Bianca Botto (Hungary) Réka-Luca Jani	(Russia) Eugeniya Pashkova (Czech Republic) Jesika Malečková (Bulgaria) Dia Evtimova (Croatia) Ana Savić
June 9	Padua, Italy; Clay $25,000; Singles and doubles draws	(United States) Louisa Chirico; 6–2, 1–6, 7–6^{(7–3)}	(Brazil) Paula Cristina Gonçalves	(Italy) Anastasia Grymalska (Italy) Alice Matteucci	(Belarus) Aliaksandra Sasnovich (Argentina) Florencia Molinero (Brazil) Gabriela Cé (Argentina) Catalina Pella
June 9	Padua, Italy; Clay $25,000; Singles and doubles draws	(Italy) Gioia Barbieri (Georgia (country)) Sofia Shapatava; 6–4, 0–6, [14–12]	(Brazil) Paula Cristina Gonçalves (Argentina) Florencia Molinero	(Italy) Anastasia Grymalska (Italy) Alice Matteucci	(Belarus) Aliaksandra Sasnovich (Argentina) Florencia Molinero (Brazil) Gabriela Cé (Argentina) Catalina Pella
June 9	Fergana Challenger; Fergana, Uzbekistan; Hard $25,000; Singles – Doubles	(Uzbekistan) Nigina Abduraimova; 6–3, 6–4	(Japan) Nao Hibino	(Montenegro) Ana Veselinović (Japan) Hiroko Kuwata	(Uzbekistan) Sabina Sharipova (Kazakhstan) Kamila Kerimbayeva (Japan) Yumi Miyazaki (Russia) Margarita Lazareva
June 9	Fergana Challenger; Fergana, Uzbekistan; Hard $25,000; Singles – Doubles	(Japan) Hiroko Kuwata (Japan) Mari Tanaka; 6–1, 6–4	(Japan) Nao Hibino (India) Prarthana Thombare	(Montenegro) Ana Veselinović (Japan) Hiroko Kuwata	(Uzbekistan) Sabina Sharipova (Kazakhstan) Kamila Kerimbayeva (Japan) Yumi Miyazaki (Russia) Margarita Lazareva
June 9	Villa del Dique, Argentina; Clay $10,000; Singles and doubles draws	(Argentina) Julieta Lara Estable; 6–3, 3–6, 6–4	(Argentina) Daniela Farfán	(Argentina) Constanza Vega (Argentina) Berta Bonardi	(Argentina) Melina Ferrero (Brazil) Ingrid Gamarra Martins (Paraguay) Sara Giménez (Chile) Ivania Martinich
June 9	Villa del Dique, Argentina; Clay $10,000; Singles and doubles draws	(Brazil) Carolina Alves (Argentina) Constanza Vega; 7–6^{(7–4)}, 6–2	(Brazil) Nathaly Kurata (Brazil) Nathália Rossi	(Argentina) Constanza Vega (Argentina) Berta Bonardi	(Argentina) Melina Ferrero (Brazil) Ingrid Gamarra Martins (Paraguay) Sara Giménez (Chile) Ivania Martinich
June 9	Minsk, Belarus; Clay $10,000; Singles and doubles draws	(France) Chloé Paquet; 6–2, 6–4	(Belarus) Lidziya Marozava	(Belarus) Vera Lapko (Ukraine) Elizaveta Ianchuk	(Belarus) Sviatlana Pirazhenka (Russia) Anastasiya Saitova (Belarus) Sadafmoh Tolibova (Russia) Anastasia Frolova
June 9	Minsk, Belarus; Clay $10,000; Singles and doubles draws	(Belarus) Lidziya Marozava (Belarus) Sviatlana Pirazhenka; 6–1, 6–3	(Russia) Anna Smolina (Russia) Liubov Vasilyeva	(Belarus) Vera Lapko (Ukraine) Elizaveta Ianchuk	(Belarus) Sviatlana Pirazhenka (Russia) Anastasiya Saitova (Belarus) Sadafmoh Tolibova (Russia) Anastasia Frolova
June 9	Banja Luka, Bosnia and Herzegovina; Clay $10,000; Singles and doubles draws	(Czech Republic) Barbora Štefková; 6–2, 6–2	(Romania) Daiana Negreanu	(United Kingdom) Eleanor Dean (Chile) Andrea Koch Benvenuto	(Germany) Stefanie Vorih (Czech Republic) Gabriela Pantůčková (Bosnia and Herzegovina) Anita Husarić (Croatia) Silvia Njirić
June 9	Banja Luka, Bosnia and Herzegovina; Clay $10,000; Singles and doubles draws	(Czech Republic) Gabriela Pantůčková (Czech Republic) Barbora Štefková; Walkover	(Bosnia and Herzegovina) Anita Husarić (Romania) Daiana Negreanu	(United Kingdom) Eleanor Dean (Chile) Andrea Koch Benvenuto	(Germany) Stefanie Vorih (Czech Republic) Gabriela Pantůčková (Bosnia and Herzegovina) Anita Husarić (Croatia) Silvia Njirić
June 9	Bol, Croatia; Clay $10,000; Singles and doubles draws	(Argentina) Nadia Podoroska; 6–3, 2–6, 6–2	(Ukraine) Olga Ianchuk	(Australia) Samantha Harris (Italy) Francesca Palmigiano	(Czech Republic) Petra Rohanová (Netherlands) Janneke Wikkerink (Germany) Christina Shakovets (Croatia) Tena Lukas
June 9	Bol, Croatia; Clay $10,000; Singles and doubles draws	(Czech Republic) Lenka Kunčíková (Czech Republic) Karolína Stuchlá; 6–0, 6–4	(Australia) Samantha Harris (Australia) Sally Peers	(Australia) Samantha Harris (Italy) Francesca Palmigiano	(Czech Republic) Petra Rohanová (Netherlands) Janneke Wikkerink (Germany) Christina Shakovets (Croatia) Tena Lukas
June 9	Sharm el-Sheikh, Egypt; Hard $10,000; Singles and doubles draws	(Romania) Elena-Teodora Cadar; 6–4, 6–4	(Russia) Anna Morgina	(Russia) Ksenia Gaydarzhi (Russia) Alina Mikheeva	(Egypt) Sandra Samir (Australia) Petra Hule (Brazil) Marcela Alves Pereira Valle (Republic of Ireland) Amy Bowtell
June 9	Sharm el-Sheikh, Egypt; Hard $10,000; Singles and doubles draws	(Russia) Anna Morgina (Norway) Caroline Rohde-Moe; 6–3, 7–5	(Romania) Elena-Teodora Cadar (Spain) Arabela Fernández Rabener	(Russia) Ksenia Gaydarzhi (Russia) Alina Mikheeva	(Egypt) Sandra Samir (Australia) Petra Hule (Brazil) Marcela Alves Pereira Valle (Republic of Ireland) Amy Bowtell
June 9	Surakarta, Indonesia; Hard $10,000; Singles and doubles draws	(China) Zhu Lin; 6–0, 6–0	(Indonesia) Lavinia Tananta	(China) Wang Yan (Indonesia) Beatrice Gumulya	(China) Yang Zhaoxuan (Thailand) Varunya Wongteanchai (Indonesia) Deria Nur Haliza (China) Gai Ao
June 9	Surakarta, Indonesia; Hard $10,000; Singles and doubles draws	(Indonesia) Nadia Ravita (Indonesia) Aldila Sutjiadi; 6–2, 7–6^{(7–3)}	(Indonesia) Beatrice Gumulya (Indonesia) Jessy Rompies	(China) Wang Yan (Indonesia) Beatrice Gumulya	(China) Yang Zhaoxuan (Thailand) Varunya Wongteanchai (Indonesia) Deria Nur Haliza (China) Gai Ao
June 9	Kashiwa, Japan; Hard $10,000; Singles and doubles draws	(Japan) Riko Sawayanagi; 6–4, 7–6^{(7–5)}	(Japan) Junri Namigata	(Japan) Kanae Hisami (Japan) Mana Ayukawa	(United States) Yuki Kristina Chiang (Japan) Yuuki Tanaka (Japan) Mizuno Kijima (Japan) Kotomi Takahata
June 9	Kashiwa, Japan; Hard $10,000; Singles and doubles draws	(United States) Yuki Kristina Chiang (Japan) Aki Yamasoto; 5–7, 6–1, [10–5]	(Japan) Makoto Ninomiya (Japan) Yuuki Tanaka	(Japan) Kanae Hisami (Japan) Mana Ayukawa	(United States) Yuki Kristina Chiang (Japan) Yuuki Tanaka (Japan) Mizuno Kijima (Japan) Kotomi Takahata
June 9	Coatzacoalcos, Mexico; Hard $10,000; Singles and doubles draws	(Mexico) Marcela Zacarías; 6–3, 7–6^{(7–3)}	(Mexico) Ximena Hermoso	(Mexico) Andrea Eskauriatza Ruiz (Mexico) Carolina Betancourt	(Mexico) Camila Fuentes (Samoa) Steffi Carruthers (United States) Gabriella Umoquit (United States) Rianna Valdes
June 9	Coatzacoalcos, Mexico; Hard $10,000; Singles and doubles draws	(Mexico) Camila Fuentes (Mexico) Marcela Zacarías; 6–2, 6–2	(Colombia) María Paulina Pérez (Colombia) Paula Andrea Pérez	(Mexico) Andrea Eskauriatza Ruiz (Mexico) Carolina Betancourt	(Mexico) Camila Fuentes (Samoa) Steffi Carruthers (United States) Gabriella Umoquit (United States) Rianna Valdes
June 9	Amstelveen, Netherlands; Clay $10,000; Singles and doubles draws	(Netherlands) Quirine Lemoine; 2–6, 6–4, 6–2	(United States) Bernarda Pera	(Hungary) Fanny Stollár (Canada) Gloria Liang	(Belgium) Catherine Chantraine (Netherlands) Gabriela van de Graaf (Netherlands) Jainy Scheepens (Argentina) Tatiana Búa
June 9	Amstelveen, Netherlands; Clay $10,000; Singles and doubles draws	(United States) Bernarda Pera (Bulgaria) Viktoriya Tomova; 6–0, 2–1, ret.	(Argentina) Tatiana Búa (Brazil) Beatriz Haddad Maia	(Hungary) Fanny Stollár (Canada) Gloria Liang	(Belgium) Catherine Chantraine (Netherlands) Gabriela van de Graaf (Netherlands) Jainy Scheepens (Argentina) Tatiana Búa
June 9	Sun City, South Africa; Hard $10,000; Singles and doubles draws	(South Africa) Chanel Simmonds; 6–2, 6–2	(South Africa) Madrie Le Roux	(South Africa) Ilze Hattingh (France) Clothilde de Bernardi	(United States) Stephanie Kent (South Africa) Natasha Fourouclas (United States) Alexandra Riley (Poland) Agata Barańska
June 9	Sun City, South Africa; Hard $10,000; Singles and doubles draws	(South Africa) Michelle Sammons (South Africa) Chanel Simmonds; 6–3, 6–3	(South Africa) Ilze Hattingh (South Africa) Madrie Le Roux	(South Africa) Ilze Hattingh (France) Clothilde de Bernardi	(United States) Stephanie Kent (South Africa) Natasha Fourouclas (United States) Alexandra Riley (Poland) Agata Barańska
June 9	Madrid, Spain; Clay $10,000; Singles and doubles draws	(Spain) Lucía Cervera Vázquez; 7–6^{(7–5)}, 6–3	(Spain) Olga Sáez Larra	(Bulgaria) Aleksandrina Naydenova (Greece) Maria Sakkari	(Spain) Olga Parres Azcoitia (France) Alice Bacquié (Romania) Ioana Loredana Roșca (Portugal) Bárbara Luz
June 9	Madrid, Spain; Clay $10,000; Singles and doubles draws	(Spain) Yvonne Cavallé Reimers (Spain) Lucía Cervera Vázquez; 6–2, 4–6, [10–5]	(Ecuador) Charlotte Römer (Spain) Olga Sáez Larra	(Bulgaria) Aleksandrina Naydenova (Greece) Maria Sakkari	(Spain) Olga Parres Azcoitia (France) Alice Bacquié (Romania) Ioana Loredana Roșca (Portugal) Bárbara Luz
June 9	Adana, Turkey; Clay $10,000; Singles and doubles draws	(Belgium) Elke Lemmens; 3–6, 6–1, 6–1	(Bulgaria) Julia Stamatova	(Romania) Ana Bogdan (Turkey) Başak Eraydın	(Germany) Stefanie Stemmer (Germany) Carolin Schmidt (Romania) Cristina Adamescu (Austria) Anna Maria Heil
June 9	Adana, Turkey; Clay $10,000; Singles and doubles draws	(Belgium) Elke Lemmens (Sweden) Anette Munozova; 6–4, 6–3	(Germany) Ina Kaufinger (Bulgaria) Lyuboslava Peruhova	(Romania) Ana Bogdan (Turkey) Başak Eraydın	(Germany) Stefanie Stemmer (Germany) Carolin Schmidt (Romania) Cristina Adamescu (Austria) Anna Maria Heil
June 16	Minsk, Belarus; Clay $25,000; Singles and doubles draws	(Russia) Irina Khromacheva; 6–4, 1–6, 6–1	(Croatia) Ema Mikulčić	(Belarus) Ilona Kremen (Ukraine) Veronika Kapshay	(Russia) Varvara Flink (Russia) Evgeniya Rodina (Russia) Olga Puchkova (Russia) Margarita Gasparyan
June 16	Minsk, Belarus; Clay $25,000; Singles and doubles draws	(Russia) Irina Khromacheva (Belarus) Ilona Kremen; 7–5, 6–0	(Belarus) Lidziya Marozava (Belarus) Sviatlana Pirazhenka	(Belarus) Ilona Kremen (Ukraine) Veronika Kapshay	(Russia) Varvara Flink (Russia) Evgeniya Rodina (Russia) Olga Puchkova (Russia) Margarita Gasparyan
June 16	Montpellier, France; Clay $25,000; Singles and doubles draws	(Bulgaria) Elitsa Kostova; 7–5, 6–1	(Ukraine) Sofiya Kovalets	(Paraguay) Montserrat González (France) Constance Sibille	(Argentina) Catalina Pella (Netherlands) Cindy Burger (France) Irina Ramialison (Brazil) Gabriela Cé
June 16	Montpellier, France; Clay $25,000; Singles and doubles draws	(Spain) Inés Ferrer Suárez (Spain) Sara Sorribes Tormo; 2–6, 6–3, [12–10]	(Chinese Taipei) Hsu Chieh-yu (Bulgaria) Elitsa Kostova	(Paraguay) Montserrat González (France) Constance Sibille	(Argentina) Catalina Pella (Netherlands) Cindy Burger (France) Irina Ramialison (Brazil) Gabriela Cé
June 16	Ystad, Sweden; Clay $25,000; Singles and doubles draws	(Slovenia) Nastja Kolar; 6–4, 6–4	(Poland) Sandra Zaniewska	(Switzerland) Xenia Knoll (Latvia) Jeļena Ostapenko	(Liechtenstein) Kathinka von Deichmann (Sweden) Susanne Celik (Norway) Melanie Stokke (Norway) Ulrikke Eikeri
June 16	Ystad, Sweden; Clay $25,000; Singles and doubles draws	(Slovenia) Nastja Kolar (Austria) Yvonne Neuwirth; 7–6^{(7–3)}, 3–6, [10–6]	(Kazakhstan) Anna Danilina (Switzerland) Xenia Knoll	(Switzerland) Xenia Knoll (Latvia) Jeļena Ostapenko	(Liechtenstein) Kathinka von Deichmann (Sweden) Susanne Celik (Norway) Melanie Stokke (Norway) Ulrikke Eikeri
June 16	Lenzerheide, Switzerland; Clay $25,000; Singles and doubles draws	(Russia) Elizaveta Kulichkova; 7–5, 6–2	(United States) Louisa Chirico	(Switzerland) Jil Teichmann (Italy) Giulia Gatto-Monticone	(Russia) Ekaterina Alexandrova (Poland) Justyna Jegiołka (Germany) Tatjana Maria (Switzerland) Karin Kennel
June 16	Lenzerheide, Switzerland; Clay $25,000; Singles and doubles draws	(United States) Louisa Chirico (United States) Sanaz Marand; 6–3, 6–4	(South Korea) Jang Su-jeong (Poland) Justyna Jegiołka	(Switzerland) Jil Teichmann (Italy) Giulia Gatto-Monticone	(Russia) Ekaterina Alexandrova (Poland) Justyna Jegiołka (Germany) Tatjana Maria (Switzerland) Karin Kennel
June 16	Přerov, Czech Republic; Clay $15,000; Singles and doubles draws	(Czech Republic) Barbora Krejčíková; 6–3, 6–4	(Slovakia) Lenka Juríková	(Chile) Andrea Koch Benvenuto (Czech Republic) Pernilla Mendesová	(Czech Republic) Eva Rutarová (Poland) Katarzyna Kawa (United Kingdom) Amanda Carreras (Serbia) Natalija Kostić
June 16	Přerov, Czech Republic; Clay $15,000; Singles and doubles draws	(Slovakia) Chantal Škamlová (Czech Republic) Barbora Štefková; 6–4, 6–3	(Czech Republic) Eva Rutarová (Czech Republic) Karolína Stuchlá	(Chile) Andrea Koch Benvenuto (Czech Republic) Pernilla Mendesová	(Czech Republic) Eva Rutarová (Poland) Katarzyna Kawa (United Kingdom) Amanda Carreras (Serbia) Natalija Kostić
June 16	Villa María, Argentina; Clay $10,000; Singles and doubles draws	(Argentina) Sofía Luini; 6–4, 6–1	(Argentina) Carla Lucero	(Brazil) Carolina Alves (Brazil) Flávia Guimarães Bueno	(Brazil) Eduarda Piai (Paraguay) Sara Giménez (Argentina) Julieta Lara Estable (Brazil) Nathaly Kurata
June 16	Villa María, Argentina; Clay $10,000; Singles and doubles draws	(Argentina) Sofía Luini (Argentina) Ana Madcur; 6–2, 4–6, [10–7]	(Brazil) Ingrid Gamarra Martins (Brazil) Eduarda Piai	(Brazil) Carolina Alves (Brazil) Flávia Guimarães Bueno	(Brazil) Eduarda Piai (Paraguay) Sara Giménez (Argentina) Julieta Lara Estable (Brazil) Nathaly Kurata
June 16	Victoria, Canada; Hard (indoor) $10,000; Singles and doubles draws	(Canada) Sonja Molnar; 6–4, 7–5	(United States) Tori Kinard	(Japan) Ayaka Okuno (Canada) Stacey Fung	(Canada) Maria Patrascu (Canada) Khristina Blajkevitch (Canada) Charlotte Petrick (Canada) Ayan Broomfield
June 16	Victoria, Canada; Hard (indoor) $10,000; Singles and doubles draws	(Canada) Ayan Broomfield (Canada) Maria Patrascu; 5–7, 6–4, [10–8]	(Canada) Khristina Blajkevitch (Canada) Wendy Zhang	(Japan) Ayaka Okuno (Canada) Stacey Fung	(Canada) Maria Patrascu (Canada) Khristina Blajkevitch (Canada) Charlotte Petrick (Canada) Ayan Broomfield
June 16	Sharm el-Sheikh, Egypt; Hard $10,000; Singles and doubles draws	(Greece) Despina Papamichail; 6–1, 6–3	(Russia) Anna Morgina	(Russia) Alina Mikheeva (Romania) Elena-Teodora Cadar	(Italy) Giorgia Pinto (Spain) Arabela Fernández Rabener (Egypt) Mai El Kamash (Romania) Raluca Georgiana Șerban
June 16	Sharm el-Sheikh, Egypt; Hard $10,000; Singles and doubles draws	(Spain) Arabela Fernández Rabener (Greece) Despina Papamichail; 6–3, 6–3	(Egypt) Mai El Kamash (Egypt) Yasmin Hamza	(Russia) Alina Mikheeva (Romania) Elena-Teodora Cadar	(Italy) Giorgia Pinto (Spain) Arabela Fernández Rabener (Egypt) Mai El Kamash (Romania) Raluca Georgiana Șerban
June 16	Civitavecchia, Italy; Hard $10,000; Singles and doubles draws	(Russia) Polina Leykina; 7–5, 6–4	(Italy) Martina Caregaro	(Italy) Jasmine Paolini (Germany) Hanna Landener	(Switzerland) Lisa Sabino (United States) Alexa Guarachi (Romania) Ioana Loredana Roșca (Paraguay) Camila Giangreco Campiz
June 16	Civitavecchia, Italy; Hard $10,000; Singles and doubles draws	(Italy) Martina Caregaro (Italy) Anna Floris; 6–4, 6–4	(United States) Alexa Guarachi (Australia) Sally Peers	(Italy) Jasmine Paolini (Germany) Hanna Landener	(Switzerland) Lisa Sabino (United States) Alexa Guarachi (Romania) Ioana Loredana Roșca (Paraguay) Camila Giangreco Campiz
June 16	Astana, Kazakhstan; Hard $10,000; Singles and doubles draws	(Georgia (country)) Sofia Kvatsabaia; 0–6, 6–1, 6–2	(Russia) Anastasia Pribylova	(Montenegro) Ana Veselinović (Russia) Yulia Bryzgalova	(Russia) Elizaveta Khabarova (Uzbekistan) Vlada Ekshibarova (Kazakhstan) Alexandra Grinchishina (Russia) Ekaterina Yashina
June 16	Astana, Kazakhstan; Hard $10,000; Singles and doubles draws	(Georgia (country)) Sofia Kvatsabaia (Montenegro) Ana Veselinović; 7–6^{(7–5)}, 7–6^{(7–3)}	(Uzbekistan) Albina Khabibulina (Kazakhstan) Ekaterina Kylueva	(Montenegro) Ana Veselinović (Russia) Yulia Bryzgalova	(Russia) Elizaveta Khabarova (Uzbekistan) Vlada Ekshibarova (Kazakhstan) Alexandra Grinchishina (Russia) Ekaterina Yashina
June 16	Quintana Roo, Mexico; Hard $10,000; Singles and doubles draws	(Mexico) Victoria Rodríguez; 4–6, 6–2, 6–4	(Mexico) Ana Sofía Sánchez	(United States) Allie Will (Mexico) Constanza Gorches	(Chinese Taipei) Hsu Ching-wen (United States) Nicole Frenkel (United States) Karyn Guttormsen (Mexico) Carolina Betancourt
June 16	Quintana Roo, Mexico; Hard $10,000; Singles and doubles draws	(United States) Anamika Bhargava (United States) Allie Will; 6–2, 6–2	(Mexico) Victoria Rodríguez (Mexico) Marcela Zacarías	(United States) Allie Will (Mexico) Constanza Gorches	(Chinese Taipei) Hsu Ching-wen (United States) Nicole Frenkel (United States) Karyn Guttormsen (Mexico) Carolina Betancourt
June 16	Alkmaar, Netherlands; Clay $10,000; Singles and doubles draws	(Belgium) Catherine Chantraine; 3–6, 6–4, 6–4	(Germany) Tamara Korpatsch	(United States) Bernarda Pera (Russia) Natela Dzalamidze	(Netherlands) Mandy Wagemaker (Philippines) Katharina Lehnert (Netherlands) Beatrice van de Velde (Brazil) Beatriz Haddad Maia
June 16	Alkmaar, Netherlands; Clay $10,000; Singles and doubles draws	(Brazil) Beatriz Haddad Maia (United States) Bernarda Pera; 6–1, 1–6, [10–5]	(Netherlands) Charlotte van der Meij (Netherlands) Mandy Wagemaker	(United States) Bernarda Pera (Russia) Natela Dzalamidze	(Netherlands) Mandy Wagemaker (Philippines) Katharina Lehnert (Netherlands) Beatrice van de Velde (Brazil) Beatriz Haddad Maia
June 16	Galați, Romania; Clay $10,000; Singles and doubles draws	(Romania) Elena Bogdan; 6–3, 6–1	(Romania) Oana Georgeta Simion	(Moldova) Anastasia Vdovenco (Romania) Patricia Maria Țig	(Romania) Gabriela Talabă (Romania) Simona Ionescu (Romania) Andreea Amalia Roșca (Romania) Camelia Hristea
June 16	Galați, Romania; Clay $10,000; Singles and doubles draws	(Romania) Camelia Hristea (Romania) Patricia Maria Țig; 6–3, 6–1	(Ukraine) Maryna Kolb (Ukraine) Nadiya Kolb	(Moldova) Anastasia Vdovenco (Romania) Patricia Maria Țig	(Romania) Gabriela Talabă (Romania) Simona Ionescu (Romania) Andreea Amalia Roșca (Romania) Camelia Hristea
June 16	Niš, Serbia; Clay $10,000; Singles and doubles draws	(Greece) Maria Sakkari; 3–6, 6–4, 6–1	(Bosnia and Herzegovina) Dea Herdželaš	(Serbia) Katarina Adamović (North Macedonia) Lina Gjorcheska	(Serbia) Mina Marković (Austria) Pia König (Serbia) Ema Polić (Hungary) Csilla Argyelán
June 16	Niš, Serbia; Clay $10,000; Singles and doubles draws	(Australia) Alexandra Nancarrow (Greece) Maria Sakkari; 6–3, 6–0	(North Macedonia) Lina Gjorcheska (Serbia) Marina Lazić	(Serbia) Katarina Adamović (North Macedonia) Lina Gjorcheska	(Serbia) Mina Marković (Austria) Pia König (Serbia) Ema Polić (Hungary) Csilla Argyelán
June 16	Gimcheon, South Korea; Hard $10,000; Singles and doubles draws	(South Korea) Lee Ye-ra; 6–2, 6–2	(South Korea) Choi Ji-hee	(South Korea) Kang Seo-kyung (China) Lu Jiajing	(China) Han Xinyun (South Korea) Hong Seung-yeon (South Korea) Kim So-jung (Japan) Kyōka Okamura
June 16	Gimcheon, South Korea; Hard $10,000; Singles and doubles draws	(South Korea) Kim So-jung (South Korea) Lee Ye-ra; 6–3, 6–1	(South Korea) Choi Ji-hee (South Korea) Lee Hye-min	(South Korea) Kang Seo-kyung (China) Lu Jiajing	(China) Han Xinyun (South Korea) Hong Seung-yeon (South Korea) Kim So-jung (Japan) Kyōka Okamura
June 16	Taipei, Taiwan; Hard $10,000; Singles and doubles draws	(Chinese Taipei) Lee Ya-hsuan; 6–3, 6–2	(Japan) Akiko Omae	(Japan) Yurina Koshino (Japan) Mizuno Kijima	(Japan) Chihiro Nunome (Chinese Taipei) Chen Pei-hsuan (Chinese Taipei) Hsieh Shu-ying (Japan) Mai Minokoshi
June 16	Taipei, Taiwan; Hard $10,000; Singles and doubles draws	(Chinese Taipei) Kao Shao-yuan (Chinese Taipei) Lee Pei-chi; 6–1, 6–4	(Japan) Mai Minokoshi (Japan) Akiko Omae	(Japan) Yurina Koshino (Japan) Mizuno Kijima	(Japan) Chihiro Nunome (Chinese Taipei) Chen Pei-hsuan (Chinese Taipei) Hsieh Shu-ying (Japan) Mai Minokoshi
June 16	Istanbul, Turkey; Hard $10,000; Singles and doubles draws	(Turkey) İpek Soylu; 6–3, 6–4	(Turkey) Melis Sezer	(Turkey) Başak Eraydın (France) Clothilde de Bernardi	(Bulgaria) Julia Stamatova (France) Caroline Roméo (Sweden) Anette Munozova (Turkey) Ayla Aksu
June 16	Istanbul, Turkey; Hard $10,000; Singles and doubles draws	(Turkey) Ayla Aksu (Turkey) İpek Soylu; 4–6, 6–3, [10–4]	(Belgium) Elke Lemmens (Bulgaria) Julia Stamatova	(Turkey) Başak Eraydın (France) Clothilde de Bernardi	(Bulgaria) Julia Stamatova (France) Caroline Roméo (Sweden) Anette Munozova (Turkey) Ayla Aksu
June 16	Bethany Beach, United States; Clay $10,000; Singles and doubles draws	(United States) Katerina Stewart; 6–0, 6–3	(United States) Josie Kuhlman	(United States) Ingrid Neel (United States) Peggy Porter	(United States) Julia Elbaba (Canada) Petra Januskova (United States) Caitlin Whoriskey (United States) Ellie Halbauer
June 16	Bethany Beach, United States; Clay $10,000; Singles and doubles draws	(United States) Lena Litvak (United States) Alexandra Mueller; 6–4, 6–1	(United States) Rima Asatrian (United States) Katerina Stewart	(United States) Ingrid Neel (United States) Peggy Porter	(United States) Julia Elbaba (Canada) Petra Januskova (United States) Caitlin Whoriskey (United States) Ellie Halbauer
June 23	ITF Women's Circuit – Xi'an; Xi'an, China; Hard $50,000; Singles – Doubles	(China) Duan Yingying; 4–6, 7–6^{(11–9)}, 6–4	(China) Zhu Lin	(Japan) Junri Namigata (Japan) Hiroko Kuwata	(Japan) Riko Sawayanagi (China) Xu Yifan (South Korea) Han Na-lae (Hong Kong) Zhang Ling
June 23	ITF Women's Circuit – Xi'an; Xi'an, China; Hard $50,000; Singles – Doubles	(China) Lu Jiajing (China) Wang Yafan; 6–3, 7–6^{(7–2)}	(China) Liang Chen (China) Yang Zhaoxuan	(Japan) Junri Namigata (Japan) Hiroko Kuwata	(Japan) Riko Sawayanagi (China) Xu Yifan (South Korea) Han Na-lae (Hong Kong) Zhang Ling
June 23	Périgueux, France; Clay $25,000; Singles and doubles draws	(Netherlands) Cindy Burger; 7–5, 6–1	(Argentina) Florencia Molinero	(Russia) Polina Vinogradova (Germany) Anne Schäfer	(Brazil) Gabriela Cé (Spain) Inés Ferrer Suárez (France) Julie Coin (France) Fiona Ferro
June 23	Périgueux, France; Clay $25,000; Singles and doubles draws	(Venezuela) Andrea Gámiz (Spain) Sara Sorribes Tormo; 5–7, 6–4, [10–8]	(Brazil) Gabriela Cé (Argentina) Florencia Molinero	(Russia) Polina Vinogradova (Germany) Anne Schäfer	(Brazil) Gabriela Cé (Spain) Inés Ferrer Suárez (France) Julie Coin (France) Fiona Ferro
June 23	Stuttgart, Germany; Clay $25,000; Singles and doubles draws	(Colombia) Mariana Duque; 5–7, 6–2, 6–2	(Germany) Carina Witthöft	(Netherlands) Richèl Hogenkamp (Luxembourg) Mandy Minella	(Netherlands) Arantxa Rus (Italy) Alberta Brianti (Germany) Laura Siegemund (Switzerland) Viktorija Golubic
June 23	Stuttgart, Germany; Clay $25,000; Singles and doubles draws	(Switzerland) Viktorija Golubic (Germany) Laura Siegemund; 6–3, 6–3	(Netherlands) Lesley Kerkhove (Netherlands) Arantxa Rus	(Netherlands) Richèl Hogenkamp (Luxembourg) Mandy Minella	(Netherlands) Arantxa Rus (Italy) Alberta Brianti (Germany) Laura Siegemund (Switzerland) Viktorija Golubic
June 23	Siófok, Hungary; Clay $25,000; Singles and doubles draws	(Czech Republic) Denisa Allertová; 6–2, 6–3	(Czech Republic) Martina Borecká	(Slovakia) Kristína Kučová (Croatia) Ana Savić	(Ukraine) Sofiya Kovalets (Turkey) Pemra Özgen (Croatia) Ana Vrljić (Slovenia) Nastja Kolar
June 23	Siófok, Hungary; Clay $25,000; Singles and doubles draws	(Czech Republic) Denisa Allertová (Slovakia) Chantal Škamlová; 6–1, 6–3	(Czech Republic) Martina Borecká (Czech Republic) Petra Krejsová	(Slovakia) Kristína Kučová (Croatia) Ana Savić	(Ukraine) Sofiya Kovalets (Turkey) Pemra Özgen (Croatia) Ana Vrljić (Slovenia) Nastja Kolar
June 23	Kristinehamn, Sweden; Clay $25,000; Singles and doubles draws	(Belgium) Ysaline Bonaventure; 6–3, 6–3	(Russia) Marina Melnikova	(Sweden) Sofia Arvidsson (Sweden) Susanne Celik	(Ukraine) Kateryna Bondarenko (Poland) Sandra Zaniewska (Czech Republic) Tereza Martincová (Russia) Marina Shamayko
June 23	Kristinehamn, Sweden; Clay $25,000; Singles and doubles draws	(Ukraine) Kateryna Bondarenko (Sweden) Cornelia Lister; Walkover	(Belgium) Ysaline Bonaventure (Poland) Sandra Zaniewska	(Sweden) Sofia Arvidsson (Sweden) Susanne Celik	(Ukraine) Kateryna Bondarenko (Poland) Sandra Zaniewska (Czech Republic) Tereza Martincová (Russia) Marina Shamayko
June 23	Breda, Netherlands; Clay $15,000; Singles and doubles draws	(United States) Bernarda Pera; 6–1, 7–6^{(10–8)}	(Brazil) Beatriz Haddad Maia	(Argentina) Tatiana Búa (France) Manon Arcangioli	(Chile) Andrea Koch Benvenuto (Netherlands) Jainy Scheepens (Belgium) Deborah Kerfs (Netherlands) Quirine Lemoine
June 23	Breda, Netherlands; Clay $15,000; Singles and doubles draws	(Russia) Natela Dzalamidze (Belarus) Sviatlana Pirazhenka; 6–4, 6–1	(Netherlands) Demi Schuurs (Netherlands) Eva Wacanno	(Argentina) Tatiana Búa (France) Manon Arcangioli	(Chile) Andrea Koch Benvenuto (Netherlands) Jainy Scheepens (Belgium) Deborah Kerfs (Netherlands) Quirine Lemoine
June 23	Sharm el-Sheikh, Egypt; Hard $10,000; Singles and doubles draws	(United States) Jan Abaza; 6–2, 3–6, 6–4	(Greece) Despina Papamichail	(Russia) Anna Morgina (New Zealand) Claudia Williams	(Japan) Risa Hasegawa (Hungary) Naomi Totka (Greece) Despoina Vogasari (Egypt) Ola Abou Zekry
June 23	Sharm el-Sheikh, Egypt; Hard $10,000; Singles and doubles draws	(Belgium) Magali Kempen (Russia) Anna Morgina; 6–4, 3–6, [10–2]	(United States) Jan Abaza (Egypt) Ola Abou Zekry	(Russia) Anna Morgina (New Zealand) Claudia Williams	(Japan) Risa Hasegawa (Hungary) Naomi Totka (Greece) Despoina Vogasari (Egypt) Ola Abou Zekry
June 23	Rome, Italy; Clay $10,000; Singles and doubles draws	(Italy) Ludmilla Samsonova; 6–2, 2–6, 6–4	(Switzerland) Tess Sugnaux	(Philippines) Katharina Lehnert (Italy) Deborah Chiesa	(France) Estelle Guisard (Italy) Carolina Pillot (Italy) Jasmine Paolini (Italy) Alice Savoretti
June 23	Rome, Italy; Clay $10,000; Singles and doubles draws	(Switzerland) Lisa Sabino (Italy) Alice Savoretti; 6–7^{(3–7)}, 7–5, [10–5]	(Germany) Luisa Marie Huber (Germany) Julia Wachaczyk	(Philippines) Katharina Lehnert (Italy) Deborah Chiesa	(France) Estelle Guisard (Italy) Carolina Pillot (Italy) Jasmine Paolini (Italy) Alice Savoretti
June 23	Astana, Kazakhstan; Hard $10,000; Singles and doubles draws	(Uzbekistan) Vlada Ekshibarova; 7–5, 6–3	(Georgia (country)) Sofia Kvatsabaia	(Russia) Ksenija Sharifova (Russia) Yulia Bryzgalova	(Montenegro) Ana Veselinović (Kazakhstan) Gozal Ainitdinova (Russia) Ekaterina Manekina (Uzbekistan) Arina Folts
June 23	Astana, Kazakhstan; Hard $10,000; Singles and doubles draws	(Uzbekistan) Albina Khabibulina (Kazakhstan) Ekaterina Klyueva; 6–3, 6–1	(Russia) Anna Grigoryan (Russia) Julia Valetova	(Russia) Ksenija Sharifova (Russia) Yulia Bryzgalova	(Montenegro) Ana Veselinović (Kazakhstan) Gozal Ainitdinova (Russia) Ekaterina Manekina (Uzbekistan) Arina Folts
June 23	Quintana Roo, Mexico; Hard $10,000; Singles and doubles draws	(Mexico) Ana Sofía Sánchez; 3–6, 6–0, 6–0	(United States) Allie Will	(Venezuela) Mariaryeni Gutiérrez (Mexico) Victoria Rodríguez	(Mexico) Ximena Hermoso (Mexico) Marcela Zacarías (Mexico) Camila Fuentes (Mexico) Carolina Betancourt
June 23	Quintana Roo, Mexico; Hard $10,000; Singles and doubles draws	(United States) Anamika Bhargava (United States) Allie Will; 6–0, 6–4	(Mexico) Victoria Rodríguez (Mexico) Marcela Zacarías	(Venezuela) Mariaryeni Gutiérrez (Mexico) Victoria Rodríguez	(Mexico) Ximena Hermoso (Mexico) Marcela Zacarías (Mexico) Camila Fuentes (Mexico) Carolina Betancourt
June 23	Amarante, Portugal; Hard $10,000; Singles and doubles draws	(France) Océane Dodin; 6–3, 6–2	(Ukraine) Valeriya Strakhova	(Austria) Barbara Haas (Portugal) Bárbara Luz	(Spain) Olga Sáez Larra (Netherlands) Jade Schoelink (France) Jessika Ponchet (Russia) Anastasiya Komardina
June 23	Amarante, Portugal; Hard $10,000; Singles and doubles draws	(Russia) Anastasiya Komardina (Ukraine) Valeriya Strakhova; 3–6, 7–5, [10–6]	(Austria) Barbara Haas (Poland) Natalia Siedliska	(Austria) Barbara Haas (Portugal) Bárbara Luz	(Spain) Olga Sáez Larra (Netherlands) Jade Schoelink (France) Jessika Ponchet (Russia) Anastasiya Komardina
June 23	Bucharest, Romania; Clay $10,000; Singles and doubles draws	(Romania) Cristina Ene; 6–4, 6–3	(Romania) Cristina Dinu	(Romania) Cristina Stancu (Romania) Elena Bogdan	(Romania) Ioana Ducu (Romania) Ana Bianca Mihăilă (Romania) Oana Georgeta Simion (Romania) Gabriela Talabă
June 23	Bucharest, Romania; Clay $10,000; Singles and doubles draws	(Romania) Raluca Elena Platon (Romania) Cristina Stancu; 6–0, 6–3	(Czech Republic) Nikola Horáková (Moldova) Anastasia Vdovenco	(Romania) Cristina Stancu (Romania) Elena Bogdan	(Romania) Ioana Ducu (Romania) Ana Bianca Mihăilă (Romania) Oana Georgeta Simion (Romania) Gabriela Talabă
June 23	Prokuplje, Serbia; Clay $10,000; Singles and doubles draws	(Ukraine) Elizaveta Ianchuk; 1–6, 7–5, 6–3	(Australia) Alexandra Nancarrow	(Czech Republic) Gabriela Pantůčková (Czech Republic) Vendula Žovincová	(North Macedonia) Lina Gjorcheska (Bosnia and Herzegovina) Dea Herdželaš (Serbia) Nina Stojanović (Turkey) Hülya Esen
June 23	Prokuplje, Serbia; Clay $10,000; Singles and doubles draws	(North Macedonia) Lina Gjorcheska (Australia) Alexandra Nancarrow; 6–2, 6–4	(Turkey) Hülya Esen (Turkey) Lütfiye Esen	(Czech Republic) Gabriela Pantůčková (Czech Republic) Vendula Žovincová	(North Macedonia) Lina Gjorcheska (Bosnia and Herzegovina) Dea Herdželaš (Serbia) Nina Stojanović (Turkey) Hülya Esen
June 23	Gimcheon, South Korea; Hard $10,000; Singles and doubles draws	(South Korea) Lee Ye-ra; 6–1, 7–5	(South Korea) Choi Ji-hee	(Japan) Kyōka Okamura (South Korea) Jeong Sunam	(Japan) Haruka Kaji (South Korea) Kim So-jung (South Korea) Hong Seung-yeon (South Korea) Kim Sun-jung
June 23	Gimcheon, South Korea; Hard $10,000; Singles and doubles draws	(South Korea) Kim So-jung (South Korea) Lee Ye-ra; 7–5, 2–6, [11–9]	(South Korea) Choi Ji-hee (Japan) Makoto Ninomiya	(Japan) Kyōka Okamura (South Korea) Jeong Sunam	(Japan) Haruka Kaji (South Korea) Kim So-jung (South Korea) Hong Seung-yeon (South Korea) Kim Sun-jung
June 23	Melilla, Spain; Hard $10,000; Singles and doubles draws	(Spain) Lucía Cervera Vázquez; 4–6, 7–6^{(7–5)}, 7–6^{(16–14)}	(Spain) Georgina García Pérez	(Paraguay) Camila Giangreco Campiz (United Kingdom) Manisha Foster	(Spain) Ainhoa Atucha Gómez (Italy) Federica Arcidiacono (Spain) Olga Parres Azcoitia (France) Joséphine Boualem
June 23	Melilla, Spain; Hard $10,000; Singles and doubles draws	(Spain) Lucía Cervera Vázquez (Spain) Olga Parres Azcoitia; 7–5, 4–6, [10–6]	(Germany) Jil Nora Engelmann (Germany) Katharina Hering	(Paraguay) Camila Giangreco Campiz (United Kingdom) Manisha Foster	(Spain) Ainhoa Atucha Gómez (Italy) Federica Arcidiacono (Spain) Olga Parres Azcoitia (France) Joséphine Boualem
June 23	Bangkok, Thailand; Hard $10,000; Singles and doubles draws	(Belgium) Elise Mertens; 6–3, 6–2	(Chinese Taipei) Lee Pei-chi	(Japan) Miyu Kato (Thailand) Nudnida Luangnam	(Indonesia) Beatrice Gumulya (Thailand) Katherine Westbury (Thailand) Peangtarn Plipuech (Indonesia) Jessy Rompies
June 23	Bangkok, Thailand; Hard $10,000; Singles and doubles draws	(Japan) Yumi Miyazaki (Japan) Kotomi Takahata; 6–3, 6–1	(Chinese Taipei) Lee Pei-chi (Thailand) Nungnadda Wannasuk	(Japan) Miyu Kato (Thailand) Nudnida Luangnam	(Indonesia) Beatrice Gumulya (Thailand) Katherine Westbury (Thailand) Peangtarn Plipuech (Indonesia) Jessy Rompies
June 23	Konya, Turkey; Hard $10,000; Singles and doubles draws	(Turkey) Melis Sezer; 6–2, 6–3	(Greece) Agni Stefanou	(France) Caroline Roméo (Bulgaria) Julia Stamatova	(Russia) Margarita Lazareva (Russia) Antonina Lysakova (Germany) Lisa-Marie Mätschke (Bulgaria) Elena Jetcheva
June 23	Konya, Turkey; Hard $10,000; Singles and doubles draws	(Russia) Margarita Lazareva (Turkey) Melis Sezer; 6–3, 6–2	(France) Clémence Fayol (Turkey) Müge Topsel	(France) Caroline Roméo (Bulgaria) Julia Stamatova	(Russia) Margarita Lazareva (Russia) Antonina Lysakova (Germany) Lisa-Marie Mätschke (Bulgaria) Elena Jetcheva
June 23	Charlotte, United States; Clay $10,000; Singles and doubles draws	(United States) Katerina Stewart; 6–1, 7–6^{(7–2)}	(United States) Josie Kuhlman	(Ukraine) Kateryna Yergina (Canada) Élisabeth Fournier	(United States) Marie Norris (United States) Alexandra Valenstein (United States) Peggy Porter (United States) Lena Litvak
June 23	Charlotte, United States; Clay $10,000; Singles and doubles draws	(United States) Lena Litvak (United States) Alexandra Mueller; 6–3, 6–3	(United States) Sophie Chang (United States) Andie Daniell	(Ukraine) Kateryna Yergina (Canada) Élisabeth Fournier	(United States) Marie Norris (United States) Alexandra Valenstein (United States) Peggy Porter (United States) Lena Litvak
June 30	Lorraine Open 88; Contrexéville, France; Clay $100,000; Singles – Doubles	(Romania) Irina-Camelia Begu; 6–3, 6–4	(Estonia) Kaia Kanepi	(Sweden) Johanna Larsson (United States) Melanie Oudin	(United States) Shelby Rogers (Luxembourg) Mandy Minella (United States) Anna Tatishvili (Germany) Annika Beck
June 30	Lorraine Open 88; Contrexéville, France; Clay $100,000; Singles – Doubles	(Russia) Alexandra Panova (France) Laura Thorpe; 6–3, 4–0, ret.	(Romania) Irina-Camelia Begu (Argentina) María Irigoyen	(Sweden) Johanna Larsson (United States) Melanie Oudin	(United States) Shelby Rogers (Luxembourg) Mandy Minella (United States) Anna Tatishvili (Germany) Annika Beck
June 30	Reinert Open; Versmold, Germany; Clay $50,000; Singles – Doubles	(Ukraine) Kateryna Kozlova; 6–4, 6–7^{(3–7)}, 6–1	(Netherlands) Richèl Hogenkamp	(Germany) Carina Witthöft (Germany) Dinah Pfizenmaier	(Czech Republic) Kateřina Siniaková (Germany) Anna-Lena Friedsam (Russia) Ekaterina Alexandrova (Georgia (country)) Sofia Shapatava
June 30	Reinert Open; Versmold, Germany; Clay $50,000; Singles – Doubles	(Canada) Gabriela Dabrowski (Colombia) Mariana Duque; 6–4, 6–2	(Paraguay) Verónica Cepede Royg (Liechtenstein) Stephanie Vogt	(Germany) Carina Witthöft (Germany) Dinah Pfizenmaier	(Czech Republic) Kateřina Siniaková (Germany) Anna-Lena Friedsam (Russia) Ekaterina Alexandrova (Georgia (country)) Sofia Shapatava
June 30	Denain, France; Clay $25,000; Singles and doubles draws	(Romania) Andreea Mitu; 4–6, 6–2, 6–1	(France) Fiona Ferro	(Brazil) Paula Cristina Gonçalves (France) Estelle Cascino	(United Kingdom) Amanda Carreras (Uzbekistan) Nigina Abduraimova (France) Julie Coin (Argentina) Florencia Molinero
June 30	Denain, France; Clay $25,000; Singles and doubles draws	(Brazil) Paula Cristina Gonçalves (Argentina) Florencia Molinero; 7–6^{(7–3)}, 7–6^{(7–4)}	(United Kingdom) Nicola Slater (Australia) Karolina Wlodarczak	(Brazil) Paula Cristina Gonçalves (France) Estelle Cascino	(United Kingdom) Amanda Carreras (Uzbekistan) Nigina Abduraimova (France) Julie Coin (Argentina) Florencia Molinero
June 30	Middelburg, Netherlands; Clay $25,000; Singles and doubles draws	(Russia) Evgeniya Rodina; 7–5, 7–5	(Netherlands) Angelique van der Meet	(Brazil) Beatriz Haddad Maia (Austria) Melanie Klaffner	(Russia) Marina Shamayko (Netherlands) Demi Schuurs (Netherlands) Quirine Lemoine (United States) Bernarda Pera
June 30	Middelburg, Netherlands; Clay $25,000; Singles and doubles draws	(Netherlands) Angelique van der Meet (Netherlands) Bernice van de Velde; 7–6^{(7–4)}, 3–6, [10–5]	(Russia) Veronika Kudermetova (Russia) Evgeniya Rodina	(Brazil) Beatriz Haddad Maia (Austria) Melanie Klaffner	(Russia) Marina Shamayko (Netherlands) Demi Schuurs (Netherlands) Quirine Lemoine (United States) Bernarda Pera
June 30	Toruń, Poland; Clay $25,000; Singles and doubles draws	(Czech Republic) Barbora Krejčíková; 6–4, 6–1	(Greece) Maria Sakkari	(Slovakia) Petra Uberalová (Czech Republic) Martina Borecká	(Serbia) Jovana Jakšić (Czech Republic) Pernilla Mendesová (Croatia) Silvia Njirić (Belarus) Aliaksandra Sasnovich
June 30	Toruń, Poland; Clay $25,000; Singles and doubles draws	(Czech Republic) Martina Borecká (Czech Republic) Martina Kubičíková; 7–6^{(7–4)}, 6–2	(Sweden) Hilda Melander (Slovakia) Chantal Škamlová	(Slovakia) Petra Uberalová (Czech Republic) Martina Borecká	(Serbia) Jovana Jakšić (Czech Republic) Pernilla Mendesová (Croatia) Silvia Njirić (Belarus) Aliaksandra Sasnovich
June 30	Brussels, Belgium; Clay $10,000; Singles and doubles draws	(Belgium) Klaartje Liebens; 7–6^{(7–4)}, 4–6, 6–1	(Italy) Alice Matteucci	(Belgium) Sofie Oyen (Russia) Natela Dzalamidze	(Greece) Valentini Grammatikopoulou (Italy) Camilla Rosatello (Romania) Diana Buzean (Greece) Angeliki Kairi
June 30	Brussels, Belgium; Clay $10,000; Singles and doubles draws	(Italy) Alice Matteucci (Italy) Camilla Rosatello; 6–4, 3–6, [10–3]	(Romania) Diana Buzean (Russia) Natela Dzalamidze	(Belgium) Sofie Oyen (Russia) Natela Dzalamidze	(Greece) Valentini Grammatikopoulou (Italy) Camilla Rosatello (Romania) Diana Buzean (Greece) Angeliki Kairi
June 30	Sharm el-Sheikh, Egypt; Hard $10,000; Singles and doubles draws	(Greece) Eleni Kordolaimi; 7–6^{(7–1)}, 3–6, 7–5	(United States) Jan Abaza	(Egypt) Ola Abou Zekry (France) Pauline Payet	(Italy) Giulia Bruzzone (Italy) Giorgia Pinto (Russia) Anastasia Shaulskaya (United States) Alexandria Stiteler
June 30	Sharm el-Sheikh, Egypt; Hard $10,000; Singles and doubles draws	(United States) Jan Abaza (Egypt) Ola Abou Zekry; 6–4, 3–6, [10–7]	(Greece) Eleni Kordolaimi (Greece) Despoina Vogasari	(Egypt) Ola Abou Zekry (France) Pauline Payet	(Italy) Giulia Bruzzone (Italy) Giorgia Pinto (Russia) Anastasia Shaulskaya (United States) Alexandria Stiteler
June 30	Astra Italy Tennis Cup; Todi, Italy; Clay $10,000; Singles – Doubles	(Italy) Alice Savoretti; 6–3, 6–3	(United States) Lauren Embree	(Paraguay) Camila Giangreco Campiz (Italy) Corinna Dentoni	(Sweden) Rebecca Peterson (Switzerland) Tess Sugnaux (Bosnia and Herzegovina) Jelena Simić (Dominican Republic) Francesca Segarelli
June 30	Astra Italy Tennis Cup; Todi, Italy; Clay $10,000; Singles – Doubles	(Italy) Deborah Chiesa (Italy) Beatrice Lombardo; 6–3, 3–6, [10–8]	(Italy) Federica Di Sarra (Italy) Alice Savoretti	(Paraguay) Camila Giangreco Campiz (Italy) Corinna Dentoni	(Sweden) Rebecca Peterson (Switzerland) Tess Sugnaux (Bosnia and Herzegovina) Jelena Simić (Dominican Republic) Francesca Segarelli
June 30	Astana, Kazakhstan; Hard $10,000; Singles and doubles draws	(Uzbekistan) Vlada Ekshibarova; 6–3, 6–4	(Georgia (country)) Mariam Bolkvadze	(Russia) Mariia Tcakanian (Kazakhstan) Ekaterina Klyueva	(Kazakhstan) Alexandra Grinchishina (Kazakhstan) Gozal Ainitdinova (Uzbekistan) Arina Folts (Russia) Anna Grigoryan
June 30	Astana, Kazakhstan; Hard $10,000; Singles and doubles draws	(Belarus) Viktoryia Mun (Russia) Mariia Tcakanian; 6–3, 6–4	(Russia) Ksenia Dmitrieva (Uzbekistan) Arina Folts	(Russia) Mariia Tcakanian (Kazakhstan) Ekaterina Klyueva	(Kazakhstan) Alexandra Grinchishina (Kazakhstan) Gozal Ainitdinova (Uzbekistan) Arina Folts (Russia) Anna Grigoryan
June 30	Quintana Roo, Mexico; Hard $10,000; Singles and doubles draws	(Mexico) Ana Sofía Sánchez; 4–6, 6–4, 6–0	(Mexico) Marcela Zacarías	(Mexico) Ximena Hermoso (Spain) Olaya Garrido Rivas	(Chinese Taipei) Hsu Ching-wen (Paraguay) Ana Paula Neffa de los Ríos (Venezuela) Mariaryeni Gutiérrez (Colombia) María Paulina Pérez
June 30	Quintana Roo, Mexico; Hard $10,000; Singles and doubles draws	(Spain) Loreto Alonso Martínez (Mexico) María Fernanda Navarro Oliva; 6–4, 6–2	(Mexico) Carolina Betancourt (Paraguay) Ana Paula Neffa de los Ríos	(Mexico) Ximena Hermoso (Spain) Olaya Garrido Rivas	(Chinese Taipei) Hsu Ching-wen (Paraguay) Ana Paula Neffa de los Ríos (Venezuela) Mariaryeni Gutiérrez (Colombia) María Paulina Pérez
June 30	Prokuplje, Serbia; Clay $10,000; Singles and doubles draws	(Australia) Alexandra Nancarrow; 4–6, 6–4, 6–2	(North Macedonia) Lina Gjorcheska	(Czech Republic) Gabriela Pantůčková (Ukraine) Elizaveta Ianchuk	(Slovakia) Lenka Wienerová (Serbia) Dunja Stamenković (Serbia) Katarina Adamović (Bosnia and Herzegovina) Dea Herdželaš
June 30	Prokuplje, Serbia; Clay $10,000; Singles and doubles draws	(North Macedonia) Lina Gjorcheska (Australia) Alexandra Nancarrow; 6–4, 7–6^{(7–5)}	(Ukraine) Olga Fridman (Ukraine) Elizaveta Ianchuk	(Czech Republic) Gabriela Pantůčková (Ukraine) Elizaveta Ianchuk	(Slovakia) Lenka Wienerová (Serbia) Dunja Stamenković (Serbia) Katarina Adamović (Bosnia and Herzegovina) Dea Herdželaš
June 30	Gimcheon, South Korea; Hard $10,000; Singles and doubles draws	(South Korea) Lee So-ra; 7–6^{(7–2)}, 2–6, 6–4	(South Korea) Han Na-lae	(China) Lu Jiajing (Japan) Haruka Kaji	(South Korea) Jeong Yeong-won (South Korea) Kim Ji-sun (South Korea) Kang Seo-kyung (South Korea) Choi Ji-hee
June 30	Gimcheon, South Korea; Hard $10,000; Singles and doubles draws	(South Korea) Choi Ji-hee (Japan) Makoto Ninomiya; 6–3, 7–6^{(8–6)}	(South Korea) Han Na-lae (South Korea) Yoo Mi	(China) Lu Jiajing (Japan) Haruka Kaji	(South Korea) Jeong Yeong-won (South Korea) Kim Ji-sun (South Korea) Kang Seo-kyung (South Korea) Choi Ji-hee
June 30	Bangkok, Thailand; Hard $10,000; Singles and doubles draws	(Belgium) Elise Mertens; 6–1, 6–1	(Thailand) Nungnadda Wannasuk	(Uzbekistan) Sabina Sharipova (Thailand) Katherine Westbury	(Japan) Kotomi Takahata (China) Xun Fangying (Thailand) Kamonwan Buayam (Thailand) Varatchaya Wongteanchai
June 30	Bangkok, Thailand; Hard $10,000; Singles and doubles draws	(Japan) Miyu Kato (Japan) Akiko Omae; 6–0, 6–0	(Thailand) Kamonwan Buayam (Thailand) Nungnadda Wannasuk	(Uzbekistan) Sabina Sharipova (Thailand) Katherine Westbury	(Japan) Kotomi Takahata (China) Xun Fangying (Thailand) Kamonwan Buayam (Thailand) Varatchaya Wongteanchai
June 30	Istanbul, Turkey; Hard $10,000; Singles and doubles draws	(France) Clothilde de Bernardi; 6–2, 6–3	(Romania) Cristina Adamescu	(Greece) Agni Stefanou (Russia) Maria Mokh	(Ukraine) Nadiya Kolb (Turkey) Melis Sezer (Kyrgyzstan) Ksenia Palkina (Romania) Stefana Andrei
June 30	Istanbul, Turkey; Hard $10,000; Singles and doubles draws	(Turkey) Başak Eraydın (Turkey) Melis Sezer; 2–6, 6–0, [10–7]	(Russia) Maria Mokh (Sweden) Anette Munozova	(Greece) Agni Stefanou (Russia) Maria Mokh	(Ukraine) Nadiya Kolb (Turkey) Melis Sezer (Kyrgyzstan) Ksenia Palkina (Romania) Stefana Andrei
