= 2013 Lale Cup =

- Date: 22–28 April
- Edition: 1st
- Location: Istanbul, Turkey

Champions

Singles
- (Croatia) Donna Vekić

Doubles
- (Russia) Ekaterina Bychkova / (Ukraine) Nadiya Kichenok
| Lale Cup | · 2014 → |

The 2013 Lale Cup is a professional tennis tournament played on outdoor hard courts. It is the first edition of the tournament which is part of the 2013 ITF Women's Circuit, offering a total of $50,000 in prize money. It takes place in Istanbul, Turkey, on 22–28 April 2013.

== WTA entrants ==
=== Seeds ===
| Country | Player | Rank^{1} | Seed |
|---|---|---|---|
| CRO | Donna Vekić | 83 | 1 |
| CZE | Kristýna Plíšková | 106 | 2 |
| GRE | Eleni Daniilidou | 123 | 3 |
| RUS | Marta Sirotkina | 129 | 4 |
| CAN | Stéphanie Dubois | 148 | 5 |
| RUS | Alexandra Panova | 150 | 6 |
| TUR | Çağla Büyükakçay | 167 | 7 |
| RUS | Ekaterina Bychkova | 181 | 8 |

- ^{1} Rankings are as of 15 April 2013

=== Other entrants ===
The following players received wildcards into the singles main draw:

- (Turkey) Hülya Esen
- (Turkey) Sultan Gönen
- (Turkey) Gülben Güldaş
- (Turkey) Melis Sezer

The following players received entry from the qualifying draw:

- (Spain) Yvonne Cavallé Reimers
- (Poland) Justyna Jegiołka
- (Russia) Mayya Katsitadze
- (Russia) Elizaveta Kulichkova

== Champions ==
=== Singles ===
- (Croatia) Donna Vekić def. (Russia) Elizaveta Kulichkova, 6–4, 7–6^{(7–4)}

=== Doubles ===
- (Russia) Ekaterina Bychkova / (Ukraine) Nadiya Kichenok def. (Turkey) Başak Eraydın / (Bulgaria) Aleksandrina Naydenova, 3–6, 6–2, [10–5]
