= 2015 Lale Cup =

- Date: 20–26 April
- Edition: 3rd
- Category: ITF Women's Circuit
- Prize money: $50,000
- Surface: Hard
- Location: Istanbul, Turkey

Champions

Singles
- (Israel) Shahar Pe'er

Doubles
- (Ukraine) Lyudmyla Kichenok / (Ukraine) Nadiia Kichenok
← 2014 ·	Lale Cup	· 2016 →

The 2015 Lale Cup was a professional tennis tournament played on outdoor hard courts. It was the third edition of the tournament and part of the 2015 ITF Women's Circuit, offering a total of $50,000 in prize money. It took place in Istanbul, Turkey, on 20–26 April 2015.

== Singles main draw entrants ==
=== Seeds ===
Country	Player	Rank^{1}	Seed
CRO	Donna Vekić	108	1
BEL	An-Sophie Mestach	111	2
ISR	Shahar Pe'er	123	3
CZE	Kristýna Plíšková	135	4
BLR	Olga Govortsova	136	5
RUS	Margarita Gasparyan	143	6
BLR	Aliaksandra Sasnovich	146	7
RUS	Ekaterina Bychkova	170	8

- ^{1} Rankings as of 13 April 2015

=== Other entrants ===
The following players received wildcards into the singles main draw:

- (Turkey) Ayla Aksu
- (Turkey) Başak Eraydın
- (Turkey) Melis Sezer
- (Turkey) İpek Soylu

The following players received entry from the qualifying draw:

- (Croatia) Jana Fett
- (Croatia) Adrijana Lekaj
- (Russia) Valeria Savinykh
- (Germany) Nina Zander

== Champions ==
=== Singles ===
- (Israel) Shahar Pe'er def. (Czech Republic) Kristýna Plíšková, 1–6, 7–6^{(7–4)}, 7–5

=== Doubles ===
- (Ukraine) Lyudmyla Kichenok / (Ukraine) Nadiia Kichenok def. (Russia) Valentyna Ivakhnenko / (Russia) Polina Monova, 6–4, 6–3
