= 2014 Lale Cup =

- Date: 21–27 April
- Edition: 2nd
- Category: ITF Women's Circuit
- Prize money: $50,000
- Surface: Hard
- Location: Istanbul, Turkey

Champions

Singles
- (Czech Republic) Denisa Allertová

Doubles
- (Czech Republic) Petra Krejsová / (Czech Republic) Tereza Smitková
← 2013 ·	Lale Cup	· 2015 →

The 2014 Lale Cup was a professional tennis tournament played on outdoor hard courts. It was the second edition of the tournament and part of the 2014 ITF Women's Circuit, offering a total of $50,000 in prize money. It took place in Istanbul, Turkey, on 21–27 April 2014.

== Singles main draw entrants ==
=== Seeds ===
Country	Player	Rank^{1}	Seed
TUR	Çağla Büyükakçay	150	1
ARG	María Irigoyen	155	2
SRB	Aleksandra Krunić	158	3
POL	Paula Kania	169	4
UKR	Yuliya Beygelzimer	171	5
RUS	Ksenia Pervak	174	6
RUS	Marta Sirotkina	177	7
UKR	Kateryna Kozlova	182	8

- ^{1} Rankings as of 14 April 2014

=== Other entrants ===
The following players received wildcards into the singles main draw:

- (Turkey) Ayla Aksu
- (Turkey) Hülya Esen
- (Turkey) İnci Öğüt
- (Turkey) İpek Soylu

The following players received entry from the qualifying draw:

- (Romania) Nicoleta-Cătălina Dascălu
- (Mexico) Ximena Hermoso
- (Slovakia) Zuzana Luknárová
- (Belarus) Iryna Shymanovich

The following player received entry into the singles main draw as a lucky loser:

- (Belgium) Michaela Boev

The following players received entry with a protected ranking:

- (Russia) Vitalia Diatchenko

The following player received entry with a junior exempt:

- (Czech Republic) Barbora Krejčíková

== Champions ==
=== Singles ===
- (Czech Republic) Denisa Allertová def. (Ukraine) Yuliya Beygelzimer 6–2, 6–3

=== Doubles ===
- (Czech Republic) Petra Krejsová / (Czech Republic) Tereza Smitková def. (Netherlands) Michaëlla Krajicek / (Serbia) Aleksandra Krunić 1–6, 7–6^{(7–2)}, [11–9]
