= 2013 Lale Cup – Singles =

Singles
- 2013 Lale Cup

Final
- Champion: (Croatia) Donna Vekić
- Runner-up: (Russia) Elizaveta Kulichkova
- Score: 6–4, 7–6^{(7–4)}

Events
Singles	Doubles
← 2012 ·	Lale Cup	· 2014 →

This was a new event on the 2013 ITF Women's Circuit.

Donna Vekić won the title, defeating Elizaveta Kulichkova in the final, 6–4, 7–6^{(7–4)}.

== Seeds ==
1. (Croatia) Donna Vekić (champion)
2. (Czech Republic) Kristýna Plíšková (quarterfinals)
3. (Greece) Eleni Daniilidou (first round)
4. (Russia) Marta Sirotkina (first round)
5. (Canada) Stéphanie Dubois (first round; retired)
6. (Russia) Alexandra Panova (second round)
7. (Turkey) Çağla Büyükakçay (second round)
8. (Russia) Ekaterina Bychkova (second round)

== Main draw ==
=== Key ===
- Q = Qualifier
- WC = Wild card
- LL = Lucky loser
- Alt = Alternate
- SE = Special exempt
- PR = Protected ranking
- ITF = ITF entry
- JE = Junior exempt
- w/o = Walkover
- r = Retired
- d = Defaulted
- SR = Special ranking

=== Finals ===
Semifinals
1	(Croatia) Donna Vekić	6	4	6
(Russia) Vera Dushevina	4	6	3
Q	(Russia) Elizaveta Kulichkova	6	7
(Croatia) Ana Vrljić	1	5

Final
1	(Croatia) Donna Vekić	6	7^{7}
Q	(Russia) Elizaveta Kulichkova	4	6^{4}

=== Top half ===
First round
1	(Croatia) D Vekić	6	7^{7}
Q	(Russia) M Katsitadze	2	6^{5}
WC	(Turkey) M Sezer	2	2
(Turkey) P Özgen	6	6
Q	(Poland) J Jegiołka	3	3
(Slovakia) K Kučová	6	6
WC	(Turkey) G Güldaş	1	0
8	(Russia) E Bychkova	6	6
3	(Greece) E Daniilidou	4	5
(Russia) V Dushevina	6	7
(Ukraine) V Ivakhnenko	6	6
WC	(Turkey) H Esen	1	3
(Ukraine) Y Beygelzimer	6	6
(Switzerland) A Sadiković	3	3
(Ukraine) L Kichenok	3	0^{r}
6	(Russia) A Panova	6	0

Second round
1	(Croatia) D Vekić	6	3	6
(Turkey) P Özgen	2	6	2
(Slovakia) K Kučová	6	6
8	(Russia) E Bychkova	0	3
(Russia) V Dushevina	6	6
(Ukraine) V Ivakhnenko	2	2
(Ukraine) Y Beygelzimer	6^{2}	6	6
6	(Russia) A Panova	7^{7}	1	4

Quarterfinals
1	(Croatia) D Vekić	6	6
(Slovakia) K Kučová	1	0
(Russia) V Dushevina	6	6
(Ukraine) Y Beygelzimer	3	4

Semifinals
1	(Croatia) D Vekić	6	4	6
(Russia) V Dushevina	4	6	3

=== Bottom half ===
First round
5	(Canada) S Dubois	0	0^{r}
(Russia) I Khromacheva	6	0
Q	(Spain) Y Cavallé Reimers	4	2
(Thailand) N Lertcheewakarn	6	6
(Georgia (country)) S Shapatava	0	3
Q	(Russia) E Kulichkova	6	6
(Ukraine) N Kichenok	6	6
4	(Russia) M Sirotkina	2	3
7	(Turkey) Ç Büyükakçay	6	6
WC	(Turkey) S Gönen	1	3
(Bosnia and Herzegovina) J Tinjić	6^{3}	3
(Croatia) A Vrljić	7^{7}	6
(Turkey) B Eraydın	7^{7}	6
(Bulgaria) A Naydenova	6^{1}	3
(Russia) M Gasparyan	6	6^{6}	1
2	(Czech Republic) Kr Plíšková	1	7^{8}	6

Second round
(Russia) I Khromacheva	6	3	1
(Thailand) N Lertcheewakarn	2	6	6
Q	(Russia) E Kulichkova	6	6
(Ukraine) N Kichenok	2	3
7	(Turkey) Ç Büyükakçay	4	0
(Croatia) A Vrljić	6	6
(Turkey) B Eraydın	4	4
2	(Czech Republic) Kr Plíšková	6	6

Quarterfinals
(Thailand) N Lertcheewakarn	3	0
Q	(Russia) E Kulichkova	6	6
(Croatia) A Vrljić	6^{4}	6	6
2	(Czech Republic) Kr Plíšková	7^{7}	1	4

Semifinals
Q	(Russia) E Kulichkova	6	7
(Croatia) A Vrljić	1	5
