= 2014 Lale Cup – Doubles =

Doubles
- 2014 Lale Cup

Final
- Champions: (Czech Republic) Petra Krejsová (Czech Republic) Tereza Smitková
- Runners-up: (Netherlands) Michaëlla Krajicek (Serbia) Aleksandra Krunić
- Score: 1–6, 7–6^{(7–2)}, [11–9]

Events
| Singles | Doubles |
| ← 2013 · | Lale Cup | · 2015 → |

Ekaterina Bychkova and Nadiya Kichenok were the defending champions, having won the event in 2013, but both players chose not to compete.

Petra Krejsová and Tereza Smitková won the tournament, defeating Michaëlla Krajicek and Aleksandra Krunić in the final, 1–6, 7–6^{(7–2)}, [11–9].

== Seeds ==
1. (Netherlands) Michaëlla Krajicek / (Serbia) Aleksandra Krunić (final)
2. (Ukraine) Yuliya Beygelzimer / (Ukraine) Kateryna Kozlova (first round)
3. (Poland) Paula Kania / (Georgia (country)) Sofia Shapatava (first round; withdrew)
4. (Turkey) Çağla Büyükakçay / (Turkey) Pemra Özgen (quarterfinals; withdrew)

== Draw ==
=== Key ===
- Q = Qualifier
- WC = Wild card
- LL = Lucky loser
- Alt = Alternate
- SE = Special exempt
- PR = Protected ranking
- ITF = ITF entry
- JE = Junior exempt
- w/o = Walkover
- r = Retired
- d = Defaulted
- SR = Special ranking

First round
1 | (Netherlands) M Krajicek (Serbia) A Krunić | 6 | 6
(North Macedonia) L Gjorcheska (Bulgaria) V Tomova | 2 | 4
(Russia) M Sirotkina (Croatia) A Vrljić | 6 | 6
(Ukraine) A Fomina (Germany) C Shakovets | 1 | 4
4 | (Turkey) Ç Büyükakçay (Turkey) P Özgen | 4 | 6 | [10]
WC | (Turkey) A Aksu (Turkey) İ Öğüt | 6 | 3 | [2]
WC | (Turkey) G Güldaş (Turkey) Tİ Köken | 4 | 2
(Belgium) M Boev (Belarus) L Marozava | 6 | 6
(Italy) ME Camerin (Germany) K Grajdek | 6^{5} | 4
(Russia) O Doroshina (Brazil) L Pigossi | 7^{7} | 6
(Czech Republic) P Krejsová (Czech Republic) T Smitková | w/o
3 | (Poland) P Kania (Georgia (country)) S Shapatava
WC | (Turkey) H Esen (Turkey) L Esen | 2 | 1
(Oman) F Al-Nabhani (Turkey) M Sezer | 6 | 6
(Turkey) B Eraydın (Turkey) İ Soylu | 1 | 6 | [13]
2 | (Ukraine) Y Beygelzimer (Ukraine) K Kozlova | 6 | 4 | [11]

Quarterfinals
1 | (Netherlands) M Krajicek (Serbia) A Krunić | 6 | 7
(Russia) M Sirotkina (Croatia) A Vrljić | 2 | 5
4 | (Turkey) Ç Büyükakçay (Turkey) P Özgen
(Belgium) M Boev (Belarus) L Marozava | w/o
(Russia) O Doroshina (Brazil) L Pigossi | 0 | 7 | [5]
(Czech Republic) P Krejsová (Czech Republic) T Smitková | 6 | 5 | [10]
(Oman) F Al-Nabhani (Turkey) M Sezer | 6 | 7^{7}
(Turkey) B Eraydın (Turkey) İ Soylu | 3 | 6^{4}

Semifinals
1 | (Netherlands) M Krajicek (Serbia) A Krunić | 6 | 6
(Belgium) M Boev (Belarus) L Marozava | 4 | 2
(Czech Republic) P Krejsová (Czech Republic) T Smitková | 6 | 6
(Oman) F Al-Nabhani (Turkey) M Sezer | 1 | 3

Final
1 | (Netherlands) M Krajicek (Serbia) A Krunić | 6 | 6^{2} | [9]
(Czech Republic) P Krejsová (Czech Republic) T Smitková | 1 | 7^{7} | [11]
