= 2013 Lale Cup – Doubles =

Doubles
- 2013 Lale Cup

Final
- Champions: (Russia) Ekaterina Bychkova (Ukraine) Nadiya Kichenok
- Runners-up: (Turkey) Başak Eraydın (Bulgaria) Aleksandrina Naydenova
- Score: 3–6, 6–2, [10–5]

Events
Singles	Doubles
← 2012 ·	Lale Cup	· 2014 →

This was a new event on the 2013 ITF Women's Circuit.

Ekaterina Bychkova and Nadiya Kichenok won the title, defeating Başak Eraydın and Aleksandrina Naydenova in the final, 3–6, 6–2, [10–5].

== Seeds ==
1. (Ukraine) Valentyna Ivakhnenko / (Georgia (country)) Sofia Shapatava (quarterfinals)
2. (Russia) Margarita Gasparyan / (Russia) Irina Khromacheva (semifinals)
3. (Turkey) Başak Eraydın / (Bulgaria) Aleksandrina Naydenova (final)
4. (Russia) Ekaterina Bychkova / (Ukraine) Nadiya Kichenok (champions)

== Draw ==
=== Key ===
- Q = Qualifier
- WC = Wild card
- LL = Lucky loser
- Alt = Alternate
- SE = Special exempt
- PR = Protected ranking
- ITF = ITF entry
- JE = Junior exempt
- w/o = Walkover
- r = Retired
- d = Defaulted
- SR = Special ranking

First round
1	(Ukraine) V Ivakhnenko (Georgia (country)) S Shapatava	6	6
(Canada) S Dubois (Bosnia and Herzegovina) J Tinjić	4	2
(Poland) J Jegiołka (Turkey) M Sezer	6	6
(Italy) C Coppola (Croatia) A Lekaj	2	1
4	(Russia) E Bychkova (Ukraine) N Kichenok	7	6
(Slovakia) K Kučová (Russia) J Zakharova	5	2
(Spain) Y Cavallé Reimers (Spain) L Cervera Vázquez	5^{r}
(Turkey) H Esen (Turkey) L Esen	2
(Turkey) GM Ateş (Turkey) İT Köken	1	2
(Ukraine) A Fomina (North Macedonia) L Gjorcheska	6	6
(Turkey) C Anıl (Turkey) G Güldaş	1	1
3	(Turkey) B Eraydın (Bulgaria) A Naydenova	6	6
(Turkey) Ç Büyükakçay (Turkey) P Özgen	6	6
(Russia) D Isaeva (Ukraine) K Kazimova	3	1
(Ukraine) O Kyrpot (Ukraine) V Zanosiyenko	1	0
2	(Russia) M Gasparyan (Russia) I Khromacheva	6	6

Quarterfinals
1	(Ukraine) V Ivakhnenko (Georgia (country)) S Shapatava	4	4
(Poland) J Jegiołka (Turkey) M Sezer	6	6
4	(Russia) E Bychkova (Ukraine) N Kichenok	6	6
(Turkey) H Esen (Turkey) L Esen	1	3
(Ukraine) A Fomina (North Macedonia) L Gjorcheska	6	2	[6]
3	(Turkey) B Eraydın (Bulgaria) A Naydenova	4	6	[10]
(Turkey) Ç Büyükakçay (Turkey) P Özgen	2	5
2	(Russia) M Gasparyan (Russia) I Khromacheva	6	7

Semifinals
(Poland) J Jegiołka (Turkey) M Sezer	3	4
4	(Russia) E Bychkova (Ukraine) N Kichenok	6	6
3	(Turkey) B Eraydın (Bulgaria) A Naydenova	6	1
2	(Russia) M Gasparyan (Russia) I Khromacheva	2	2^{r}

Final
4	(Russia) E Bychkova (Ukraine) N Kichenok	3	6	[10]
3	(Turkey) B Eraydın (Bulgaria) A Naydenova	6	2	[5]
