= 2015 Lale Cup – Singles =

Singles
- 2015 Lale Cup

Final
- Champion: (Israel) Shahar Pe'er
- Runner-up: (Czech Republic) Kristýna Plíšková
- Score: 1–6, 7–6^{(7–4)}, 7–5

Events
Singles	Doubles
← 2014 ·	Lale Cup	· 2016 →

Denisa Allertová was the defending champion, but she chose to participate at the 2015 Porsche Tennis Grand Prix instead.

Shahar Pe'er won the title, defeating Kristýna Plíšková in the final, 1–6, 7–6^{(7–4)}, 7–5.

== Seeds ==
1. (Croatia) Donna Vekić (quarterfinals)
2. (Belgium) An-Sophie Mestach (first round)
3. (Israel) Shahar Pe'er (champion)
4. (Czech Republic) Kristýna Plíšková (final)
5. (Belarus) Olga Govortsova (quarterfinals)
6. (Russia) Margarita Gasparyan (semifinals)
7. (Belarus) Aliaksandra Sasnovich (first round)
8. (Russia) Ekaterina Bychkova (quarterfinals)

== Main draw ==
=== Key ===
- Q = Qualifier
- WC = Wild card
- LL = Lucky loser
- Alt = Alternate
- SE = Special exempt
- PR = Protected ranking
- ITF = ITF entry
- JE = Junior exempt
- w/o = Walkover
- r = Retired
- d = Defaulted
- SR = Special ranking

=== Finals ===
Semifinals
6	(Russia) Margarita Gasparyan	6^{12}	5
4	(Czech Republic) Kristýna Plíšková	7^{14}	7
3	(Israel) Shahar Pe'er	7	6
(Estonia) Anett Kontaveit	5	4

Final
4	(Czech Republic) Kristýna Plíšková	6	6^{4}	5
3	(Israel) Shahar Pe'er	1	7^{7}	7

=== Top half ===
First round
1	(Croatia) D Vekić	6	7
Q	(Russia) V Savinykh	1	5
WC	(Turkey) A Aksu	6	6
(Czech Republic) A Hlaváčková	3	1
Q	(Croatia) A Lekaj	6^{3}	2
(Ukraine) L Kichenok	7^{7}	6
(Czech Republic) R Voráčová	3	3
6	(Russia) M Gasparyan	6	6
4	(Czech Republic) Kr Plíšková	6	6
WC	(Turkey) B Eraydın	1	1
Q	(Germany) N Zander	6	6
(France) J Coin	1	3
(Turkey) P Özgen	6	7
WC	(Turkey) M Sezer	4	5
(Ukraine) A Vasylyeva	3	6	4
8	(Russia) E Bychkova	6	4	6

Second round
1	(Croatia) D Vekić	7^{7}	4	6
WC	(Turkey) A Aksu	6^{3}	6	1
(Ukraine) L Kichenok	6	6^{5}	1
6	(Russia) M Gasparyan	4	7^{7}	6
4	(Czech Republic) Kr Plíšková	6	6
Q	(Germany) N Zander	3	3
(Turkey) P Özgen	7	3	6^{1}
8	(Russia) E Bychkova	5	6	7^{7}

Quarterfinals
1	(Croatia) D Vekić	6	4	6^{6}
6	(Russia) M Gasparyan	2	6	7^{8}
4	(Czech Republic) Kr Plíšková	6	6
8	(Russia) E Bychkova	1	4

Semifinals
6	(Russia) M Gasparyan	6^{12}	5
4	(Czech Republic) Kr Plíšková	7^{14}	7

=== Bottom half ===
First round
5	(Belarus) O Govortsova	2	6	6
(Croatia) A Vrljić	6	3	3
(Ukraine) N Kichenok	6	2	2
WC	(Turkey) İ Soylu	3	6	6
Q	(Croatia) J Fett	7^{10}	6
(Russia) M Sirotkina	6^{8}	3
(Netherlands) I de Vroome	2	2
3	(Israel) S Pe'er	6	6
7	(Belarus) A Sasnovich	2	4
(Estonia) A Kontaveit	6	6
(United Kingdom) N Broady	6	6
(Georgia (country)) S Shapatava	1	4
(Belgium) Y Bonaventure	4	2
(Croatia) T Mrdeža	6	6
(Bulgaria) E Kostova	6	4	6
2	(Belgium) A-S Mestach	3	6	4

Second round
5	(Belarus) O Govortsova	6	6
WC	(Turkey) İ Soylu	3	2
Q	(Croatia) J Fett	6	0	2
3	(Israel) S Pe'er	1	6	6
(Estonia) A Kontaveit	6	7^{7}
(United Kingdom) N Broady	2	6^{4}
(Croatia) T Mrdeža	6	6
(Bulgaria) E Kostova	4	1

Quarterfinals
5	(Belarus) O Govortsova	4	1
3	(Israel) S Pe'er	6	6
(Estonia) A Kontaveit	6	7
(Croatia) T Mrdeža	2	5

Semifinals
3	(Israel) S Pe'er	7	6
(Estonia) A Kontaveit	5	4
