= 2014 Lale Cup – Singles =

Singles
- 2014 Lale Cup

Final
- Champion: (Czech Republic) Denisa Allertová
- Runner-up: (Ukraine) Yuliya Beygelzimer
- Score: 6–2, 6–3

Events
Singles	Doubles
← 2013 ·	Lale Cup	· 2015 →

Donna Vekić was the defending champion, having won the event in 2013, but chose not to participate.

Denisa Allertová won the tournament, defeating Yuliya Beygelzimer in the final, 6–2, 6–3.

== Seeds ==
1. (Turkey) Çağla Büyükakçay (first round)
2. (Argentina) María Irigoyen (first round)
3. (Serbia) Aleksandra Krunić (second round)
4. (Poland) Paula Kania (quarterfinals)
5. (Ukraine) Yuliya Beygelzimer (final)
6. (Russia) Ksenia Pervak (semifinals)
7. (Russia) Marta Sirotkina (second round)
8. (Ukraine) Kateryna Kozlova (quarterfinals)

== Main draw ==
=== Key ===
- Q = Qualifier
- WC = Wild card
- LL = Lucky loser
- Alt = Alternate
- SE = Special exempt
- PR = Protected ranking
- ITF = ITF entry
- JE = Junior exempt
- w/o = Walkover
- r = Retired
- d = Defaulted
- SR = Special ranking

=== Finals ===
Semifinals
5	(Ukraine) Yuliya Beygelzimer	6	7^{7}
PR	(Russia) Vitalia Diatchenko	2	6^{3}
6	(Russia) Ksenia Pervak	5	2
(Czech Republic) Denisa Allertová	7	6

Final
5	(Ukraine) Yuliya Beygelzimer	2	3
(Czech Republic) Denisa Allertová	6	6

=== Top half ===
First round
1	(Turkey) Ç Büyükakçay	6	3	2
WC	(Turkey) İ Soylu	1	6	6
(Georgia (country)) S Shapatava	4	0^{r}
(Italy) ME Camerin	6	4
(Turkey) B Eraydın	2	6^{3}
(Turkey) P Özgen	6	7^{7}
LL	(Belgium) M Boev	1	2
5	(Ukraine) Y Beygelzimer	6	6
3	(Serbia) A Krunić	5	6	7^{7}
JE	(Czech Republic) B Krejčíková	7	2	6^{5}
PR	(Russia) V Diatchenko	6	6
(Brazil) L Pigossi	1	3
Q	(Slovakia) Z Luknárová	6	6
WC	(Turkey) İ Öğüt	0	2
(Netherlands) M Krajicek	1	4
8	(Ukraine) K Kozlova	6	6

Second round
WC	(Turkey) İ Soylu	6^{3}	6	0
(Italy) ME Camerin	7^{7}	4	6
(Turkey) P Özgen	2	1
5	(Ukraine) Y Beygelzimer	6	6
3	(Serbia) A Krunić	2	1
PR	(Russia) V Diatchenko	6	6
Q	(Slovakia) Z Luknárová	2	6^{1}
8	(Ukraine) K Kozlova	6	7^{7}

Quarterfinals
(Italy) ME Camerin	6	4	2
5	(Ukraine) Y Beygelzimer	3	6	6
PR	(Russia) V Diatchenko	6	6
8	(Ukraine) K Kozlova	1	3

Semifinals
5	(Ukraine) Y Beygelzimer	6	7^{7}
PR	(Russia) V Diatchenko	2	6^{3}

=== Bottom half ===
First round
6	(Russia) K Pervak	6	6
(Israel) D Khazaniuk	4	3
WC	(Turkey) H Esen	0	1
(Czech Republic) T Smitková	6	6
Q	(Belarus) I Shymanovich	7^{7}	7
WC	(Turkey) A Aksu	6^{5}	5
(Croatia) A Vrljić	4	3
4	(Poland) P Kania	6	6
7	(Russia) M Sirotkina	6	6
Q	(Romania) N-C Dascălu	2	3
Q	(Mexico) X Hermoso	3	3
(Czech Republic) D Allertová	6	6
(Turkey) M Sezer	4	6^{3}
(Ukraine) L Kichenok	6	7^{7}
(Russia) M Katsitadze	6	6
2	(Argentina) M Irigoyen	4	1

Second round
6	(Russia) K Pervak	6	6
(Czech Republic) T Smitková	3	0
Q	(Belarus) I Shymanovich	6	5	5
4	(Poland) P Kania	0	7	7
7	(Russia) M Sirotkina	4	2
(Czech Republic) D Allertová	6	6
(Ukraine) L Kichenok	6	6
(Russia) M Katsitadze	2	2

Quarterfinals
6	(Russia) K Pervak	6	6
4	(Poland) P Kania	2	2
(Czech Republic) D Allertová	6	5
(Ukraine) L Kichenok	2	0^{r}

Semifinals
6	(Russia) K Pervak	5	2
(Czech Republic) D Allertová	7	6
