= 2015 Guangzhou International Women's Open =

- Date: September 22–26
- Edition: 12th
- Category: WTA International
- Draw: 32S / 16D
- Prize money: US$250,000
- Surface: Hard
- Location: Guangzhou, China
- Venue: Guangzhou International Tennis Center

Champions

Singles
- (Serbia) Jelena Janković

Doubles
- (Switzerland) Martina Hingis / (India) Sania Mirza
- Guangzhou International Women's Open

The 2015 Guangzhou International Women's Open was a women's tennis tournament played on outdoor hard courts. It was the 12th edition of the Guangzhou International Women's Open, and part of the WTA International tournaments of the 2015 WTA Tour. It took place in Guangzhou, China, from September 22 through September 26, 2015. Fourth-seeded Jelena Janković won the singles title.

== Finals ==
=== Singles ===
- (Serbia) Jelena Janković defeated (Czech Republic) Denisa Allertová, 6–2, 6–0

=== Doubles ===
- (Switzerland) Martina Hingis / (India) Sania Mirza defeated (China) Xu Shilin / (China) You Xiaodi, 6–3, 6–1

== Points and prize money ==
Event	W	F	SF	QF	Round of 16	Round of 32	Q	Q2	Q1
Singles	280	180	110	60	30	1	18	12	1
Doubles	280	180	110	60	1	—N/a	—N/a	—N/a	—N/a

=== Prize money ===
Event	W	F	SF	QF	Round of 16	Round of 32^{1}	Q2	Q1
Singles	$43,000	$21,400	$11,500	$6,175	$3,400	$2,100	$1,020	$600
Doubles *	$12,300	$6,400	$3,435	$1,820	$960	—N/a	—N/a	—N/a

_{^{1} Qualifiers prize money is also the Round of 32 prize money}
_{* per team}

== Singles main-draw entrants ==
=== Seeds ===
Country	Player	Rank^{1}	Seed
ROU	Simona Halep	2	1
GER	Andrea Petkovic	17	2
ITA	Sara Errani	21	3
SRB	Jelena Janković	25	4
RUS	Svetlana Kuznetsova	31	5
ROU	Monica Niculescu	39	6
MNE	Danka Kovinić	69	7
CHN	Zheng Saisai	70	8

- ^{1} Rankings are as of September 14, 2015.

=== Other entrants ===
The following players received wildcards into the singles main draw:

- (China) Wang Yafan
- (China) Yang Zhaoxuan
- (China) Zhang Shuai

The following players received entry from the qualifying draw:

- (Tunisia) Ons Jabeur
- (Estonia) Anett Kontaveit
- (Croatia) Petra Martić
- (Sweden) Rebecca Peterson
- (China) Wang Qiang
- (China) Zhang Kailin

=== Withdrawals ===
Before the tournament

- (Russia) Margarita Gasparyan → replaced by (Belgium) Yanina Wickmayer
- (Belarus) Olga Govortsova → replaced by (China) Duan Yingying

== Doubles main-draw entrants ==
=== Seeds ===
Country	Player	Country	Player	Rank^{1}	Seed
SUI	Martina Hingis	IND	Sania Mirza	3	1
POL	Klaudia Jans-Ignacik	AUS	Anastasia Rodionova	71	2
CHN	Liang Chen	CHN	Wang Yafan	121	3
GBR	Jocelyn Rae	GBR	Anna Smith	154	4

- ^{1} Rankings are as of September 14, 2015.
