= 2015 Lale Cup – Doubles =

Doubles
- 2015 Lale Cup

Final
- Champions: (Ukraine) Lyudmyla Kichenok (Ukraine) Nadiia Kichenok
- Runners-up: (Russia) Valentyna Ivakhnenko (Russia) Polina Monova
- Score: 6–4, 6–3

Events
Singles	Doubles
← 2014 ·	Lale Cup	· 2016 →

Petra Krejsová and Tereza Smitková were the defending champions, but Krejsová chose to participate at the 2015 Hardee's Pro Classic whilst Smitková chose not to participate.

The top seeds Lyudmyla Kichenok and Nadiia Kichenok won the title, defeating Russian-duo Valentyna Ivakhnenko and Polina Monova in the final, 6–4, 6–3.

== Seeds ==
1. (Ukraine) Lyudmyla Kichenok / (Ukraine) Nadiia Kichenok (champions)
2. (Argentina) Tatiana Búa / (Chile) Daniela Seguel (first round)
3. (Russia) Margarita Gasparyan / (Russia) Veronika Kudermetova (first round)
4. (France) Julie Coin / (Croatia) Ana Vrljić (quarterfinals)

== Draw ==
=== Key ===
- Q = Qualifier
- WC = Wild card
- LL = Lucky loser
- Alt = Alternate
- SE = Special exempt
- PR = Protected ranking
- ITF = ITF entry
- JE = Junior exempt
- w/o = Walkover
- r = Retired
- d = Defaulted
- SR = Special ranking

First round
1	(Ukraine) L Kichenok (Ukraine) N Kichenok	6	6
WC	(Turkey) İT Köken (Turkey) S Öral	2	0
WC	(Turkey) B Eraydın (Bulgaria) I Shinikova	3	6^{4}
(Russia) O Doroshina (Austria) S Klemenschits	6	7^{7}
3	(Russia) M Gasparyan (Russia) V Kudermetova	2	4
(Belarus) L Marozava (Belarus) A Sasnovich	6	6
(Ukraine) A Fomina (Georgia (country)) E Gorgodze	4	7^{7}	[7]
(United Kingdom) N Broady (Russia) E Bychkova	6	6^{4}	[10]
(Turkey) A Aksu (Turkey) M Sezer	3	2
(Russia) V Ivakhnenko (Russia) P Monova	6	6
WC	(Turkey) C Anıl (Poland) A Barańska	0	6^{3}
4	(France) J Coin (Croatia) A Vrljić	6	7^{7}
(Georgia (country)) S Shapatava (Ukraine) A Vasylyeva	5	6	[12]
(Russia) N Dzalamidze (Bulgaria) E Kostova	7	4	[14]
(Turkey) P Özgen (Turkey) İ Soylu	6	6
2	(Argentina) T Búa (Chile) D Seguel	1	4

Quarterfinals
1	(Ukraine) L Kichenok (Ukraine) N Kichenok	6	6
(Russia) O Doroshina (Austria) S Klemenschits	4	3
(Belarus) L Marozava (Belarus) A Sasnovich	6	6
(United Kingdom) N Broady (Russia) E Bychkova	3	4
(Russia) V Ivakhnenko (Russia) P Monova	7^{7}	7^{7}
4	(France) J Coin (Croatia) A Vrljić	6^{5}	6^{0}
(Russia) N Dzalamidze (Bulgaria) E Kostova	2	0
(Turkey) P Özgen (Turkey) İ Soylu	6	6

Semifinals
1	(Ukraine) L Kichenok (Ukraine) N Kichenok	6	6
(Belarus) L Marozava (Belarus) A Sasnovich	4	2
(Russia) V Ivakhnenko (Russia) P Monova	7	6
(Turkey) P Özgen (Turkey) İ Soylu	5	4

Final
1	(Ukraine) L Kichenok (Ukraine) N Kichenok	6	6
(Russia) V Ivakhnenko (Russia) P Monova	4	3
