= 2014 Australian Open =

- Date: 13–26 January 2014
- Edition: 102nd
- Category: Grand Slam (ITF)
- Draw: 128S/64D/32X
- Prize money: A$33,000,000
- Surface: Hard (Plexicushion)
- Location: Melbourne, Victoria, Australia
- Venue: Melbourne Park
- Attendance: 643,280

Champions

Men's singles
- (Switzerland) Stan Wawrinka

Women's singles
- (China) Li Na

Men's doubles
- (Poland) Łukasz Kubot / (Sweden) Robert Lindstedt

Women's doubles
- (Italy) Sara Errani / (Italy) Roberta Vinci

Mixed doubles
- (France) Kristina Mladenovic / (Canada) Daniel Nestor

Wheelchair men's singles
- (Japan) Shingo Kunieda

Wheelchair women's singles
- (Germany) Sabine Ellerbrock

Wheelchair quad singles
- (United States) David Wagner

Wheelchair men's doubles
- (France) Stéphane Houdet / (Japan) Shingo Kunieda

Wheelchair women's doubles
- (Japan) Yui Kamiji / (United Kingdom) Jordanne Whiley

Wheelchair quad doubles
- (United Kingdom) Andrew Lapthorne / (United States) David Wagner

Boys' singles
- (Germany) Alexander Zverev

Girls' singles
- (Russia) Elizaveta Kulichkova

Boys' doubles
- (Austria) Lucas Miedler / (Australia) Bradley Mousley

Girls' doubles
- (Ukraine) Anhelina Kalinina / (Russia) Elizaveta Kulichkova

Men's legends doubles
- (Australia) Todd Woodbridge / (Australia) Mark Woodforde

Women's legends doubles
- (Australia) Nicole Bradtke / (Australia) Rennae Stubbs
- Australian Open

The 2014 Australian Open was a tennis tournament that took place at Melbourne Park between 13 and 26 January 2014. It was the 102nd edition of the Australian Open, and the first Grand Slam tournament of the year. The tournament consisted of events for professional players in singles, doubles and mixed doubles play. Junior and wheelchair players competed in singles and doubles tournaments.

Li Na won the women's singles, beating Dominika Cibulková in the final. Stanislas Wawrinka defeated Rafael Nadal in the men's singles final to win his first grand slam title. Sara Errani and Roberta Vinci defended their women's doubles title with a victory over Ekaterina Makarova and Elena Vesnina. Łukasz Kubot and Robert Lindstedt took the men's doubles title with a victory over Eric Butorac and Raven Klaasen. The mixed doubles were won by Kristina Mladenovic and Daniel Nestor, with Sania Mirza and Horia Tecău the runners-up.

Both defending singles champions lost in the quarterfinals, the first time in the open era. Novak Djokovic was the three-time defending champion in the men's singles, but failed to defend his title, losing to eventual champion Wawrinka. Two-time defending champion Victoria Azarenka also failed to defend her title in the women's singles, losing to Agnieszka Radwańska. In addition, the men's doubles defending champions Bob & Mike Bryan also failed to defend their title, while Errani and Vinci managed to retain their title. As in previous years, this tournament's title sponsor was Kia.

== Tournament ==
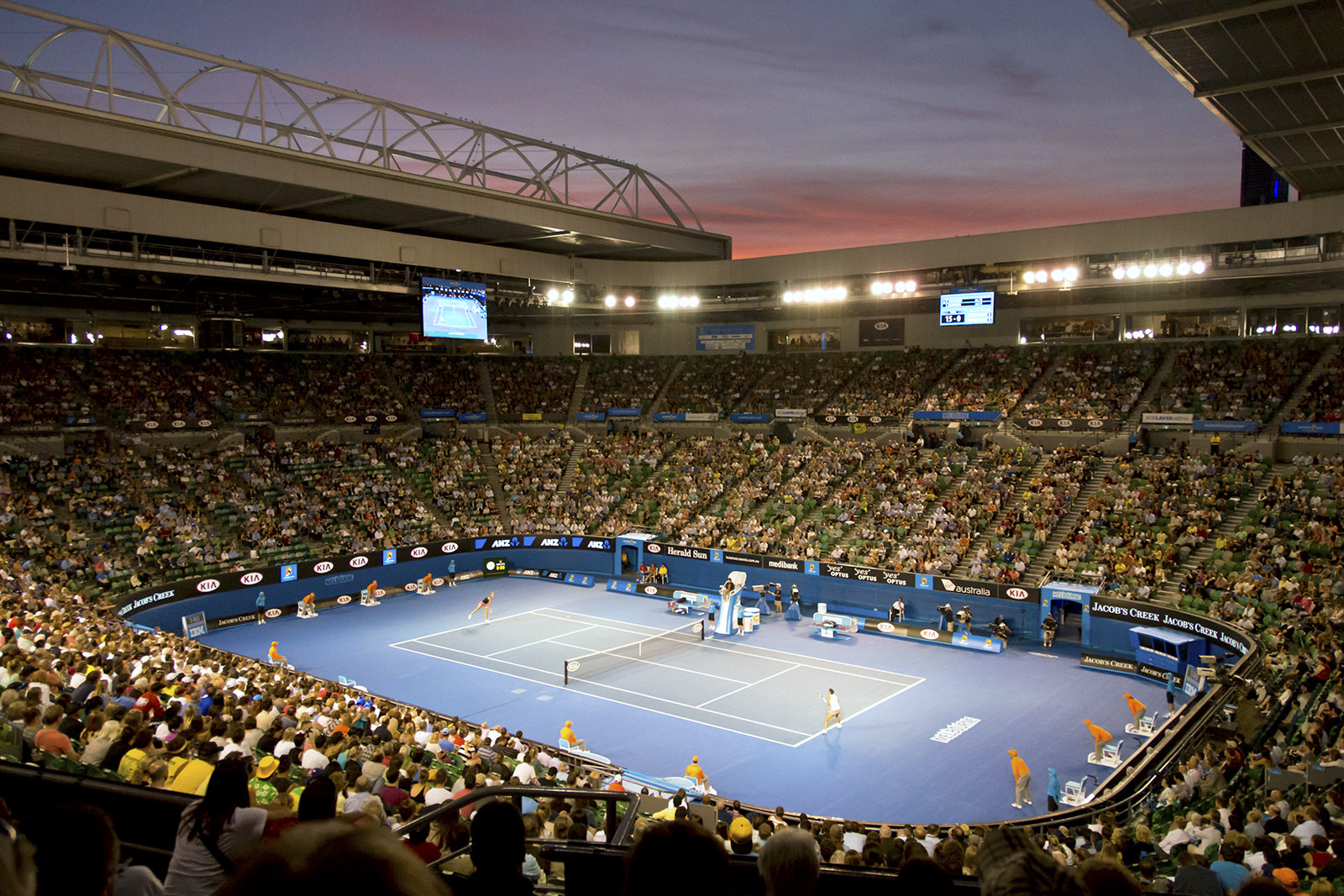
Rod Laver Arena where the Finals of the Australian Open take place

The 2014 Australian Open was the 102nd edition of the tournament and was held at Melbourne Park in Melbourne, Victoria, Australia.

The tournament was run by the International Tennis Federation (ITF) and was part of the 2014 ATP World Tour and the 2014 WTA Tour calendars under the Grand Slam category. The tournament consisted of both men's and women's singles and doubles draws as well as a mixed doubles event. There were singles and doubles events for both boys and girls (players under 18), which is part of the Grade A category of tournaments, and also singles, doubles and quad events for men's and women's wheelchair tennis players as part of the NEC tour under the Grand Slam category.

The tournament was played on hard courts and took place over a series of 16 courts, including the three main showcourts: Rod Laver Arena, Hisense Arena and Margaret Court Arena. The latter was undergoing refurbishment, as part of the Melbourne Park Redevelopment project.

== Broadcast ==
In Australia, all matches were broadcast live by the Seven Network. The majority of matches were shown on the network's primary channel Channel Seven, however during news programming nationwide and most night matches in Perth, coverage shifted to 7Two. Coverage was presented by Johanna Griggs, Jim Wilson, Matt White, Hamish McLachlan and Basil Zempilas, with commentary from Bruce McAvaney, Jim Courier, Sam Smith, Todd Woodbridge, John Newcombe, Rennae Stubbs, Henri Leconte and John Fitzgerald. Lleyton Hewitt, who was competing in the tournament, would become a commentator if he is knocked out. Some outside court matches were shown on Fox Sports on Foxtel.

== Point and prize money distribution ==
=== Point distribution ===
Below is a series of tables for each of the competitions showing the ranking points on offer for each event.

==== Senior points ====
Event	W	F	SF	QF	Round of 16	Round of 32	Round of 64	Round of 128	Q	Q3	Q2	Q1
Men's singles	2000	1200	720	360	180	90	45	10	25	16	8	0
Men's doubles	2000	1200	720	360	180	90	0	—N/a	—N/a	—N/a	—N/a	—N/a
Women's singles	2000	1300	780	430	240	130	70	10	40	30	20	2
Women's doubles	2000	1300	780	430	240	130	10	—N/a	—N/a	—N/a	—N/a	—N/a

==== Wheelchair points ====
Event	W	F	SF/3rd	QF/4th
Singles	800	500	375	100
Doubles	800	500	100	—N/a
Quad singles	800	500	100	—N/a
Quad doubles	800	100	—N/a	—N/a

==== Junior points ====
Event	W	F	SF	QF	Round of 16	Round of 32	Q	Q3
Boys' singles	375	270	180	120	75	30	25	20
Girls' singles	375	270	180	120	75	30	25	20
Boys' doubles	270	180	120	75	45	—N/a	—N/a	—N/a
Girls' doubles	270	180	120	75	45	—N/a	—N/a	—N/a

=== Prize money ===
The Australian Open total prize money for 2014 was increased by three million Australian dollars to tournament record A$33,000,000.

Event	W	F	SF	QF	Round of 16	Round of 32	Round of 64	Round of 128^{1}	Q3	Q2	Q1
Singles	A$2,650,000	A$1,325,000	A$540,000	A$270,000	A$135,000	A$75,000	A$50,000	A$30,000	A$14,400	A$7,200	A$3,600
Doubles *	A$520,000	A$260,000	A$130,000	A$65,000	A$36,000	A$21,000	A$13,500	—N/a	—N/a	—N/a	—N/a
Mixed doubles *	A$135,500	A$67,750	A$33,900	A$15,500	A$7,800	A$3,800	—N/a	—N/a	—N/a	—N/a	—N/a

_{^{1}Qualifiers prize money is also the Round of 128 prize money.}
_{*per team}

== Singles players ==
2014 Australian Open – Men's singles

Champion		Runner-up	
(Switzerland) Stan Wawrinka [8]		(Spain) Rafael Nadal [1]	
Semifinals out
(Switzerland) Roger Federer [6]		(Czech Republic) Tomáš Berdych [7]	
Quarterfinals out
(Bulgaria) Grigor Dimitrov [22]	(United Kingdom) Andy Murray [4]	(Spain) David Ferrer [3]	(Serbia) Novak Djokovic [2]
4th round out
(Japan) Kei Nishikori [16]	(Spain) Roberto Bautista Agut	(France) Stéphane Robert (LL)	(France) Jo-Wilfried Tsonga [10]
(South Africa) Kevin Anderson [19]	(Germany) Florian Mayer	(Spain) Tommy Robredo [17]	(Italy) Fabio Fognini [15]
3rd round out
(France) Gaël Monfils [25]	(United States) Donald Young	(Canada) Milos Raonic [11]	(France) Benoît Paire [27]
(Spain) Feliciano López [26]	(Slovakia) Martin Kližan (LL)	(France) Gilles Simon [18]	(Russia) Teymuraz Gabashvili
(Bosnia and Herzegovina) Damir Džumhur (Q)	(France) Édouard Roger-Vasselin	(Poland) Jerzy Janowicz [20]	(France) Jérémy Chardy [29]
(Canada) Vasek Pospisil [28]	(France) Richard Gasquet [9]	(United States) Sam Querrey	(Uzbekistan) Denis Istomin
2nd round out
(Australia) Thanasi Kokkinakis (WC)	(United States) Jack Sock	(Italy) Andreas Seppi [24]	(Serbia) Dušan Lajović (Q)
(Romania) Victor Hănescu	(Chinese Taipei) Lu Yen-hsun	(Australia) Nick Kyrgios (WC)	(Argentina) Juan Martín del Potro [5]
(France) Vincent Millot (Q)	(Germany) Michael Berrer (Q)	(Poland) Michał Przysiężny	(Slovenia) Blaž Rola (LL)
(Brazil) Thomaz Bellucci (Q)	(Croatia) Marin Čilić	(Spain) Fernando Verdasco [31]	(Slovenia) Blaž Kavčič
(France) Kenny de Schepper	(Croatia) Ivan Dodig [32]	(Austria) Dominic Thiem (Q)	(Spain) Guillermo García López
(Russia) Mikhail Youzhny [14]	(Spain) Pablo Andújar	(Ukraine) Alexandr Dolgopolov	(France) Adrian Mannarino
(Colombia) Alejandro Falla	(Australia) Matthew Ebden	(France) Julien Benneteau	(Russia) Nikolay Davydenko
(Finland) Jarkko Nieminen	(Latvia) Ernests Gulbis [23]	(Russia) Dmitry Tursunov [30]	(Argentina) Leonardo Mayer
1st round out
(Australia) Bernard Tomic	(Netherlands) Igor Sijsling	(Germany) Tobias Kamke	(United States) Ryan Harrison
(Australia) Lleyton Hewitt	(Netherlands) Robin Haase	(France) Lucas Pouille (WC)	(Australia) Marinko Matosevic
(Spain) Daniel Gimeno Traver	(Germany) Peter Gojowczyk (Q)	(Chinese Taipei) Jimmy Wang (Q)	(United States) Bradley Klahn
(Canada) Frank Dancevic	(Germany) Benjamin Becker	(United States) Tim Smyczek	(United States) Rhyne Williams (Q)
(Japan) Go Soeda	(United States) Wayne Odesnik (Q)	(France) Michaël Llodra	(India) Somdev Devvarman
(Slovenia) Aljaž Bedene	(Argentina) Horacio Zeballos	(Argentina) Federico Delbonis	(United States) John Isner [13]
(Italy) Filippo Volandri	(Germany) Julian Reister	(Spain) Marcel Granollers	(Germany) Daniel Brands
(China) Zhang Ze (Q)	(Ukraine) Sergiy Stakhovsky	(Czech Republic) Radek Štěpánek	(Australia) James Duckworth (WC)
(Kazakhstan) Oleksandr Nedovyesov	(China) Wu Di (WC)	(Czech Republic) Jan Hájek	(Croatia) Ivo Karlović
(Czech Republic) Jiří Veselý	(Portugal) João Sousa	(Argentina) Carlos Berlocq	(Germany) Tommy Haas [12]
(Germany) Jan-Lennard Struff	(United States) Denis Kudla (Q)	(Spain) Albert Ramos	(Australia) Jordan Thompson (WC)
(Netherlands) Jesse Huta Galung	(Lithuania) Ričardas Berankis (Q)	(United States) Steve Johnson	(Colombia) Alejandro González
(Kazakhstan) Andrey Golubev	(Kazakhstan) Mikhail Kukushkin	(France) Nicolas Mahut	(Australia) Samuel Groth (WC)
(Czech Republic) Lukáš Rosol	(Spain) Pablo Carreño	(Poland) Łukasz Kubot	(France) David Guez (Q)
(Russia) Alex Bogomolov	(Israel) Dudi Sela	(Colombia) Santiago Giraldo	(Argentina) Juan Mónaco
(United States) Michael Russell	(Cyprus) Marcos Baghdatis	(Spain) Albert Montañés	(Slovakia) Lukáš Lacko

2014 Australian Open – Women's singles

Champion		Runner-up	
(China) Li Na [4]		(Slovakia) Dominika Cibulková [20]	
Semifinals out
(Canada) Eugenie Bouchard [30]		(Poland) Agnieszka Radwańska [5]	
Quarterfinals out
(Serbia) Ana Ivanovic [14]	(Italy) Flavia Pennetta [28]	(Romania) Simona Halep [11]	(Belarus) Victoria Azarenka [2]
4th round out
(United States) Serena Williams [1]	(Australia) Casey Dellacqua (WC)	(Russia) Ekaterina Makarova [22]	(Germany) Angelique Kerber [9]
(Serbia) Jelena Janković [8]	(Russia) Maria Sharapova [3]	(Spain) Garbiñe Muguruza	(United States) Sloane Stephens [13]
3rd round out
(Slovakia) Daniela Hantuchová [31]	(Australia) Samantha Stosur [17]	(China) Zheng Jie	(United States) Lauren Davis
(Czech Republic) Lucie Šafářová [26]	(Romania) Monica Niculescu	(United States) Alison Riske	(Germany) Mona Barthel
(Japan) Kurumi Nara	(Kazakhstan) Zarina Diyas (Q)	(Spain) Carla Suárez Navarro [16]	(France) Alizé Cornet [25]
(Russia) Anastasia Pavlyuchenkova [29]	(Denmark) Caroline Wozniacki [10]	(Ukraine) Elina Svitolina	(Austria) Yvonne Meusburger
2nd round out
(Serbia) Vesna Dolonc	(Czech Republic) Karolína Plíšková	(Bulgaria) Tsvetana Pironkova	(Germany) Annika Beck
(United States) Madison Keys	(Belgium) Kirsten Flipkens [18]	(France) Virginie Razzano	(Germany) Julia Görges
(Switzerland) Belinda Bencic (Q)	(Czech Republic) Lucie Hradecká (Q)	(United States) Irina Falconi (LL)	(Germany) Sabine Lisicki [15]
(Russia) Alla Kudryavtseva (Q)	(Belgium) Yanina Wickmayer	(Puerto Rico) Monica Puig	(Thailand) Luksika Kumkhum
(Japan) Ayumi Morita	(Slovakia) Magdaléna Rybáriková [32]	(New Zealand) Marina Erakovic	(United States) Varvara Lepchenko
(Kazakhstan) Galina Voskoboeva	(Switzerland) Stefanie Vögele	(Italy) Camila Giorgi	(Italy) Karin Knapp
(Belarus) Olga Govortsova	(Luxembourg) Mandy Minella	(Slovakia) Anna Karolína Schmiedlová	(United States) Christina McHale
(Croatia) Ajla Tomljanović	(Australia) Olivia Rogowska (WC)	(Serbia) Bojana Jovanovski [33]	(Czech Republic) Barbora Záhlavová-Strýcová
1st round out
(Australia) Ashleigh Barty (WC)	(Spain) Lara Arruabarrena	(France) Pauline Parmentier (WC)	(United Kingdom) Heather Watson (Q)
(Czech Republic) Klára Zakopalová	(Spain) Sílvia Soler Espinosa	(Croatia) Petra Martić	(Netherlands) Kiki Bertens
(Italy) Roberta Vinci [12]	(Austria) Patricia Mayr-Achleitner	(Russia) Vera Zvonareva (PR)	(United Kingdom) Laura Robson
(China) Tang Haochen (WC)	(Belgium) Alison Van Uytvanck	(United States) Sachia Vickery (WC)	(Italy) Sara Errani [7]
(Croatia) Ana Konjuh (Q)	(Japan) Kimiko Date-Krumm	(Croatia) Donna Vekić	(Israel) Julia Glushko
(United States) Venus Williams	(Spain) Anabel Medina Garrigues	(Israel) Shahar Pe'er	(Croatia) Mirjana Lučić-Baroni
(Australia) Jarmila Gajdošová (WC)	(France) Caroline Garcia	(Germany) Dinah Pfizenmaier	(Russia) Elena Vesnina [23]
(Romania) Alexandra Cadanțu	(Georgia (country)) Anna Tatishvili (Q)	(China) Zhang Shuai	(Czech Republic) Petra Kvitová [6]
(Japan) Misaki Doi	(Ukraine) Nadiia Kichenok	(China) Peng Shuai	(Germany) Andrea Petkovic
(Romania) Sorana Cîrstea [21]	(Czech Republic) Kateřina Siniaková (Q)	(Ukraine) Lesia Tsurenko	(Poland) Katarzyna Piter (Q)
(United States) Vania King	(Romania) Irina-Camelia Begu (Q)	(France) Kristina Mladenovic	(Italy) Francesca Schiavone
(Slovenia) Polona Hercog	(Australia) Storm Sanders (WC)	(Argentina) Paula Ormaechea	(United States) Bethanie Mattek-Sands
(Kazakhstan) Yulia Putintseva	(China) Duan Yingying (Q)	(Germany) Carina Witthöft (Q)	(Brazil) Teliana Pereira
(Estonia) Kaia Kanepi [24]	(Hungary) Tímea Babos	(Chinese Taipei) Chan Yung-jan (PR)	(Spain) Lourdes Domínguez Lino
(Kazakhstan) Yaroslava Shvedova	(Slovenia) Tadeja Majerič	(Colombia) Mariana Duque	(Russia) Svetlana Kuznetsova [19]
(Slovakia) Jana Čepelová	(South Africa) Chanelle Scheepers	(Chinese Taipei) Hsieh Su-wei	(Sweden) Johanna Larsson

== Champions ==
=== Seniors ===
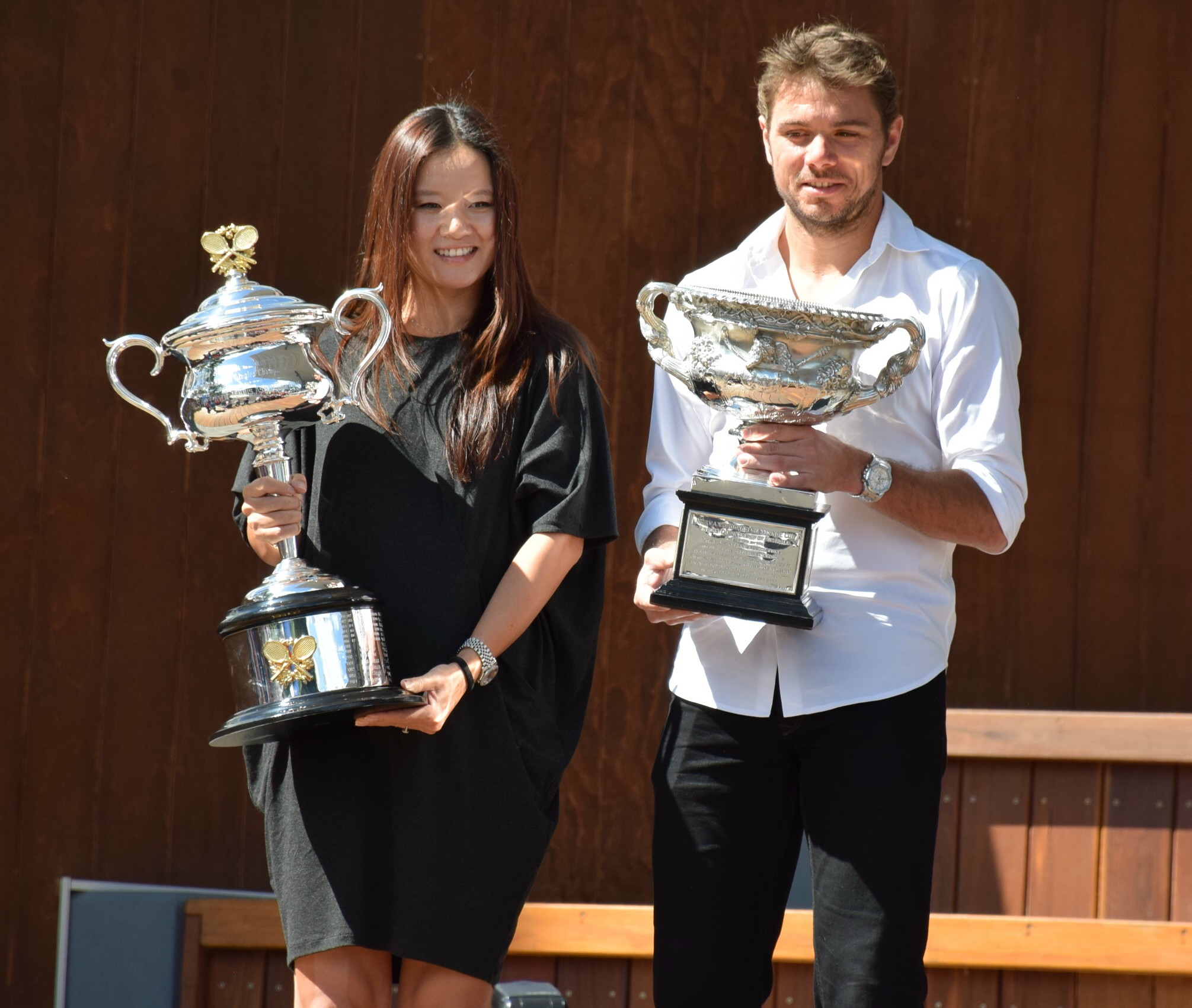
Li Na and Stan Wawrinka photographed at the 2015 Australian Open with the trophies they won in 2014.

==== Men's singles ====
- (Switzerland) Stan Wawrinka defeated (Spain) Rafael Nadal, 6–3, 6–2, 3–6, 6–3

• It was Wawrinka's 1st career Major title.

==== Women's singles ====
- (China) Li Na defeated (Slovakia) Dominika Cibulková, 7–6^{(7–3)}, 6–0

• It was Li's 2nd and last career Major title and her 1st and only title in Australian Open.

==== Men's doubles ====
- (Poland) Łukasz Kubot / (Sweden) Robert Lindstedt defeated (United States) Eric Butorac / (South Africa) Raven Klaasen, 6–3, 6–3

• It was Kubot and Lindstedt's 1st career Major doubles title.

==== Women's doubles ====
- (Italy) Sara Errani / (Italy) Roberta Vinci defeated (Russia) Ekaterina Makarova / (Russia) Elena Vesnina, 6–4, 3–6, 7–5

• It was Errani and Vinci's 4th career Major doubles title and their 2nd respective title in Australian Open.

==== Mixed doubles ====
- (France) Kristina Mladenovic / (Canada) Daniel Nestor defeated (India) Sania Mirza / (Romania) Horia Tecău, 6–3, 6–2

• It was Nestor's 8th career Major mixed doubles title and his 4th title in Australian Open.
• It was Mladenovic's 3rd career Major mixed doubles title and her 1st title in Australian Open.

=== Juniors ===
==== Boys' singles ====
- (Germany) Alexander Zverev defeated (United States) Stefan Kozlov, 6–3, 6–0

==== Girls' singles ====
- (Russia) Elizaveta Kulichkova defeated (Croatia) Jana Fett, 6–2, 6–1

==== Boys' doubles ====
- (Austria) Lucas Miedler / (Australia) Bradley Mousley defeated (France) Quentin Halys / (France) Johan Sébastien Tatlot, 6–4, 6–3

==== Girls' doubles ====
- (Ukraine) Anhelina Kalinina / (Russia) Elizaveta Kulichkova defeated (United Kingdom) Katie Boulter / (Serbia) Ivana Jorović, 6–4, 6–2

=== Legends ===
==== Legends' men doubles ====
- (Australia) Todd Woodbridge / (Australia) Mark Woodforde defeated (Sweden) Jonas Björkman / (Sweden) Thomas Enqvist, 4–6, 6–2, [13–11]

==== Legends women's doubles ====
- (Australia) Nicole Bradtke / (Australia) Rennae Stubbs

=== Wheelchair events ===
==== Wheelchair men's singles ====
- (Japan) Shingo Kunieda defeated (Argentina) Gustavo Fernández, 6–0, 6–1

==== Wheelchair women's singles ====
- (Germany) Sabine Ellerbrock defeated (Japan) Yui Kamiji, 3–6, 6–4, 6–2

==== Wheelchair quad singles ====
- (United States) David Wagner defeated (South Africa) Lucas Sithole, 3–6, 7–5, 6–3

==== Wheelchair men's doubles ====
- (France) Stéphane Houdet / (Japan) Shingo Kunieda defeated (United Kingdom) Gordon Reid / (Netherlands) Maikel Scheffers, 6–3, 6–3

==== Wheelchair women's doubles ====
- (Japan) Yui Kamiji / (United Kingdom) Jordanne Whiley defeated (Netherlands) Marjolein Buis / (Netherlands) Jiske Griffioen, 6–2, 6–7, 6–2

==== Wheelchair quad doubles ====
- (United Kingdom) Andrew Lapthorne / (United States) David Wagner defeated (Australia) Dylan Alcott / (South Africa) Lucas Sithole, 6–4, 6–4

== Singles seeds ==
The following are the seeded players and notable players who withdrew from the event. Seeding are arranged according to ATP and WTA rankings on 6 January 2014, while ranking and points before are as of 13 January 2014.

=== Men's singles ===
Seed	Rank	Player	Points before	Points defending	Points won	Points after	Status
1	1	(Spain) Rafael Nadal	13,130	0	1,200	14,330	Runner-up, lost to (Switzerland) Stan Wawrinka [8]
2	2	(Serbia) Novak Djokovic	12,260	2,000	360	10,620	Quarterfinals lost to (Switzerland) Stan Wawrinka [8]
3	3	(Spain) David Ferrer	5,640	720	360	5,280	Quarterfinals lost to (Czech Republic) Tomáš Berdych [7]
4	4	(United Kingdom) Andy Murray	5,560	1,200	360	4,720	Quarterfinals lost to (Switzerland) Roger Federer [6]
5	5	(Argentina) Juan Martín del Potro	5,415	90	45	5,370	Second round lost to (Spain) Roberto Bautista Agut
6	6	(Switzerland) Roger Federer	4,355	720	720	4,355	Semifinals lost to (Spain) Rafael Nadal [1]
7	7	(Czech Republic) Tomáš Berdych	4,180	360	720	4,540	Semifinals lost to (Switzerland) Stan Wawrinka [8]
8	8	(Switzerland) Stan Wawrinka	3,890	180	2,000	5,710	Champion, defeated (Spain) Rafael Nadal [1]
9	9	(France) Richard Gasquet	3,140	180	90	3,050	Third round lost to (Spain) Tommy Robredo [17]
10	10	(France) Jo-Wilfried Tsonga	3,065	360	180	2,885	Fourth round lost to (Switzerland) Roger Federer [6]
11	11	(Canada) Milos Raonic	2,860	180	90	2,770	Third round lost to (Bulgaria) Grigor Dimitrov [22]
12	12	(Germany) Tommy Haas	2,435	10	10	2,435	First round retired against (Spain) Guillermo García López
13	13	(United States) John Isner	2,310	0	10	2,320	First round retired against (Slovakia) Martin Kližan [LL]
14	15	(Russia) Mikhail Youzhny	2,145	45	45	2,145	Second round lost to (Germany) Florian Mayer
15	16	(Italy) Fabio Fognini	1,930	10	180	2,100	Fourth round lost to (Serbia) Novak Djokovic [2]
16	17	(Japan) Kei Nishikori	1,915	180	180	1,915	Fourth round lost to (Spain) Rafael Nadal [1]
17	18	(Spain) Tommy Robredo	1,810	10	180	1,980	Fourth round lost to (Switzerland) Stan Wawrinka [8]
18	19	(France) Gilles Simon	1,790	180	90	1,700	Third round lost to (France) Jo-Wilfried Tsonga [10]
19	21	(South Africa) Kevin Anderson	1,580	180	180	1,580	Fourth round lost to (Czech Republic) Tomáš Berdych [7]
20	20	(Poland) Jerzy Janowicz	1,615	90	90	1,615	Third round lost to (Germany) Florian Mayer
~~21~~	~~23~~	~~(Germany) Philipp Kohlschreiber~~	1,420	90	0	1,330	Withdrew due to hamstring injury
22	22	(Bulgaria) Grigor Dimitrov	1,460	10	360	1,810	Quarterfinals lost to (Spain) Rafael Nadal [1]
23	24	(Latvia) Ernests Gulbis	1,418	(20)^{†}	45	1,443	Second round lost to (United States) Sam Querrey
24	25	(Italy) Andreas Seppi	1,360	180	45	1,225	Second round lost to (United States) Donald Young
25	32	(France) Gaël Monfils	1,245	90	90	1,245	Third round lost to (Spain) Rafael Nadal [1]
26	27	(Spain) Feliciano López	1,310	45	90	1,355	Third round lost to (United Kingdom) Andy Murray [4]
27	28	(France) Benoît Paire	1,300	10	90	1,380	Third round lost to (Spain) Roberto Bautista Agut
28	30	(Canada) Vasek Pospisil	1,289	(20)^{†}	90	1,359	Third round withdrew due to back injury
29	31	(France) Jérémy Chardy	1,255	360	90	985	Third round lost to (Spain) David Ferrer [3]
30	26	(Russia) Dmitry Tursunov	1,314	(45)^{†}	45	1,314	Second round lost to (Uzbekistan) Denis Istomin
31	33	(Spain) Fernando Verdasco	1,235	90	45	1,190	Second round lost to (Russia) Teymuraz Gabashvili
32	34	(Croatia) Ivan Dodig	1,190	90	45	1,145	Second round retired against (Bosnia and Herzegovina) Damir Džumhur [Q]

† The player did not qualify for the tournament in 2013. Accordingly, points for his 18th best result are deducted instead.

The following players would have been seeded, but they withdrew before the event.

Rank	Player	Points before	Points defending	Points after	Withdrawal reason
14	(Spain) Nicolás Almagro	2,290	360	1,930	Right shoulder injury
29	(Austria) Jürgen Melzer	1,290	90	1,200	Shoulder injury

=== Women's singles ===
Seed	Rank	Player	Points before	Points defending	Points won	Points after	Status
1	1	(United States) Serena Williams	13,260	500	240	13,000	Fourth round lost to (Serbia) Ana Ivanovic [14]
2	2	(Belarus) Victoria Azarenka	8,151	2,000	430	6,581	Quarterfinals lost to (Poland) Agnieszka Radwańska [5]
3	3	(Russia) Maria Sharapova	6,076	900	240	5,416	Fourth round lost to (Slovakia) Dominika Cibulková [20]
4	4	(China) Li Na	5,970	1,400	2,000	6,570	Champion, defeated (Slovakia) Dominika Cibulková [20]
5	5	(Poland) Agnieszka Radwańska	5,470	500	780	5,750	Semifinals lost to (Slovakia) Dominika Cibulková [20]
6	6	(Czech Republic) Petra Kvitová	4,835	100	10	4,745	First round lost to (Thailand) Luksika Kumkhum
7	7	(Italy) Sara Errani	4,435	5	10	4,440	First round lost to (Germany) Julia Görges
8	8	(Serbia) Jelena Janković	4,230	160	240	4,310	Fourth round lost to (Romania) Simona Halep [11]
9	9	(Germany) Angelique Kerber	4,070	280	240	4,030	Fourth round lost to (Italy) Flavia Pennetta [28]
10	10	(Denmark) Caroline Wozniacki	3,520	280	130	3,370	Third round lost to (Spain) Garbiñe Muguruza
11	11	(Romania) Simona Halep	3,335	5	430	3,760	Quarterfinals lost to (Slovakia) Dominika Cibulková [20]
12	12	(Italy) Roberta Vinci	3,170	160	10	3,020	First round lost to (China) Zheng Jie
13	13	(United States) Sloane Stephens	3,075	900	240	2,415	Fourth round lost to (Belarus) Victoria Azarenka [2]
14	14	(Serbia) Ana Ivanovic	3,010	280	430	3,160	Quarterfinals lost to (Canada) Eugenie Bouchard [30]
15	15	(Germany) Sabine Lisicki	2,915	5	70	2,980	Second round lost to (Romania) Monica Niculescu
16	16	(Spain) Carla Suárez Navarro	2,775	160	130	2,745	Third round lost to (Slovakia) Dominika Cibulková [20]
17	17	(Australia) Samantha Stosur	2,675	100	130	2,705	Third round lost to (Serbia) Ana Ivanovic [14]
18	19	(Belgium) Kirsten Flipkens	2,465	280	70	2,255	Second round lost to (Australia) Casey Dellacqua [WC]
19	20	(Russia) Svetlana Kuznetsova	2,202	500	10	1,712	First round lost to (Ukraine) Elina Svitolina
20	24	(Slovakia) Dominika Cibulková	1,856	100	1,300	3,056	Runner-up, lost to (China) Li Na [4]
21	21	(Romania) Sorana Cîrstea	2,170	160	10	2,020	First round lost to (New Zealand) Marina Erakovic
22	22	(Russia) Ekaterina Makarova	2,061	500	240	1,801	Fourth round lost to (China) Li Na [4]
23	28	(Russia) Elena Vesnina	1,745	280	10	1,475	First round lost to (United States) Alison Riske
24	23	(Estonia) Kaia Kanepi	1,922	0	10	1,932	First round lost to (Spain) Garbiñe Muguruza
25	25	(France) Alizé Cornet	1,840	100	130	1,870	Third round lost to (Russia) Maria Sharapova [3]
26	26	(Czech Republic) Lucie Šafářová	1,775	100	130	1,805	Third round lost to (China) Li Na [4]
~~27~~	~~27~~	~~(United States) Jamie Hampton~~	1,761	160	0	1,601	Withdrew due to hip injury
28	29	(Italy) Flavia Pennetta	1,735	0	430	2,165	Quarterfinals lost to (China) Li Na [4]
29	30	(Russia) Anastasia Pavlyuchenkova	1,715	5	130	1,840	Third round lost to (Poland) Agnieszka Radwańska [5]
30	31	(Canada) Eugenie Bouchard	1,629	40	780	2,369	Semifinals lost to (China) Li Na [4]
31	33	(Slovakia) Daniela Hantuchová	1,475	5	130	1,600	Third round lost to (United States) Serena Williams [1]
32	35	(Slovakia) Magdaléna Rybáriková	1,450	5	70	1,515	Second round lost to (Japan) Kurumi Nara
33	34	(Serbia) Bojana Jovanovski	1,475	280	70	1,265	Second round lost to (Austria) Yvonne Meusburger

The following player would have been seeded, but not entered before the event.

Rank	Player	Points before	Points defending	Points after	Withdrawal reason
18	(Russia) Maria Kirilenko	2,605	280	2,325	Ankle injury

== Main draw wildcard entries ==
=== Men's singles ===
- (Australia) James Duckworth
- (Australia) Sam Groth
- (United States) Steve Johnson
- (Australia) Thanasi Kokkinakis
- (Australia) Nick Kyrgios
- (France) Lucas Pouille
- (Australia) Jordan Thompson
- (China) Wu Di

=== Women's singles ===
- (Australia) Ashleigh Barty
- (Australia) Casey Dellacqua
- (Australia) Jarmila Gajdošová
- (France) Pauline Parmentier
- (Australia) Olivia Rogowska
- (Australia) Storm Sanders
- (China) Tang Haochen
- (United States) Sachia Vickery

=== Men's doubles ===
- (India) Yuki Bhambri / (New Zealand) Michael Venus
- (Australia) Alex Bolt / (Australia) Andrew Whittington
- (Australia) James Duckworth / (Australia) Matthew Ebden
- (Australia) Chris Guccione / (Australia) Thanasi Kokkinakis
- (Australia) Lleyton Hewitt / (Australia) Patrick Rafter
- (Australia) Benjamin Mitchell / (Australia) Jordan Thompson
- (Australia) Matt Reid / (Australia) Luke Saville

=== Women's doubles ===
- (Australia) Monique Adamczak / (Australia) Olivia Rogowska
- (Australia) Naiktha Bains / (Australia) Olivia Tjandramulia
- (Australia) Jelena Dokić / (Australia) Storm Sanders
- (Australia) Azra Hadzic / (Australia) Jessica Moore
- (China) Han Xinyun / (Japan) Miki Miyamura
- (Australia) Tammi Patterson / (Australia) Arina Rodionova
- (Australia) Sally Peers / (Australia) Viktorija Rajicic

=== Mixed doubles ===
- (Canada) Eugenie Bouchard / (Australia) Sam Groth
- (Australia) Jarmila Gajdošová / (Australia) Matthew Ebden
- (Australia) Arina Rodionova / (Australia) Nick Kyrgios
- (Australia) Olivia Rogowska / (Australia) John-Patrick Smith
- (Australia) Storm Sanders / (Australia) Chris Guccione
- (Croatia) Ajla Tomljanović / (Australia) James Duckworth
- (Croatia) Donna Vekić / (Australia) Thanasi Kokkinakis

== Main draw qualifier entries ==
=== Men's singles ===
- (Bosnia and Herzegovina) Damir Džumhur
- (Austria) Dominic Thiem
- (France) David Guez
- (United States) Denis Kudla
- (Serbia) Dušan Lajović
- (China) Zhang Ze
- (Germany) Michael Berrer
- (Canada) Frank Dancevic
- (United States) Wayne Odesnik
- (Brazil) Thomaz Bellucci
- (France) Vincent Millot
- (Chinese Taipei) Jimmy Wang
- (United States) Rhyne Williams
- (Lithuania) Ričardas Berankis
- (Slovenia) Blaž Rola
- (Germany) Peter Gojowczyk

Lucky losers

- (Slovakia) Martin Kližan
- (France) Stéphane Robert

=== Women's singles ===
- (Switzerland) Belinda Bencic
- (Germany) Carina Witthöft
- (Croatia) Ana Konjuh
- (Kazakhstan) Zarina Diyas
- (Poland) Katarzyna Piter
- (Russia) Alla Kudryavtseva
- (United Kingdom) Heather Watson
- (Czech Republic) Lucie Hradecká
- (Czech Republic) Kateřina Siniaková
- (China) Duan Yingying
- (Romania) Irina-Camelia Begu
- (Georgia (country)) Anna Tatishvili

Lucky loser

- (United States) Irina Falconi

== Protected ranking ==
The following players were accepted directly into the main draw using a protected ranking:

Women's singles

- (Chinese Taipei) Chan Yung-jan (PR 88)
- (Russia) Vera Zvonareva (PR 15)

== Withdrawals ==
The following players were accepted directly into the main tournament, but withdrew with injuries, suspensions or personal reasons.

Men's singles

- (Spain) Nicolás Almagro → replaced by (Slovakia) Martin Kližan
- (United States) Brian Baker → replaced by (France) Michaël Llodra
- (Germany) Philipp Kohlschreiber → replaced by (France) Stéphane Robert
- (Austria) Jürgen Melzer → replaced by (Germany) Jan-Lennard Struff
- (Serbia) Janko Tipsarević → replaced by (Czech Republic) Jan Hájek
- (Serbia) Viktor Troicki → replaced by (Japan) Go Soeda
- (Estonia) Jürgen Zopp → replaced by (Slovenia) Blaž Kavčič

Women's singles

- (United States) Jamie Hampton → replaced by (United States) Irina Falconi
- (Russia) Maria Kirilenko → replaced by (Croatia) Petra Martić
- (Czech Republic) Iveta Melzer → replaced by (Kazakhstan) Yulia Putintseva
- (Switzerland) Romina Oprandi → replaced by (Slovenia) Tadeja Majerič
- (Russia) Nadia Petrova → replaced by (Bulgaria) Tsvetana Pironkova
- (Poland) Urszula Radwańska → replaced by (Croatia) Mirjana Lučić-Baroni
- (Spain) María Teresa Torró Flor → replaced by (Belgium) Alison Van Uytvanck

Preceded by 2013 US Open	Grand Slam Tournaments	Succeeded by 2014 French Open
