= 2015 Guangzhou International Women's Open – Doubles =

Doubles
- 2015 Guangzhou International Women's Open

Final
- Champions: (Switzerland) Martina Hingis (India) Sania Mirza
- Runners-up: (China) Xu Shilin (China) You Xiaodi
- Score: 6–3, 6–1

Details
- Draw: 15
- Seeds: 4

Events
Singles	Doubles
- Guangzhou International Women's Open

Chuang Chia-jung and Liang Chen were the defending champions, but Chuang chose not to participate. Liang played alongside Wang Yafan, but lost in the quarterfinals to Xu Shilin and You Xiaodi.

Martina Hingis and Sania Mirza won the title, defeating Xu and You in the final, 6–3, 6–1.

== Seeds ==
The top seeds received a bye into the Quarterfinals.

1. (Switzerland) Martina Hingis / (India) Sania Mirza (champions)
2. (Poland) Klaudia Jans-Ignacik / (Australia) Anastasia Rodionova (semifinals)
3. (China) Liang Chen / (China) Wang Yafan (quarterfinals)
4. (United Kingdom) Jocelyn Rae / (United Kingdom) Anna Smith (quarterfinals)

== Draw ==
Key

- Q = Qualifier
- WC = Wild card
- LL = Lucky loser
- Alt = Alternate
- ITF = ITF entry
- PR = Protected ranking
- SR = Special ranking
- SE = Special exempt
- JE = Junior exempt
- JR = Junior Accelerator Programme entrant
- CO = College Accelerator Programme entrant
- NG = Next Gen Accelerator Program entrant
- w/o = Walkover
- r = Retired
- d = Defaulted

First round
(Germany) A-L Friedsam (Romania) M Niculescu	6	6
(Russia) A Morgina (Hong Kong) L Zhang	0	3
4	(United Kingdom) J Rae (United Kingdom) A Smith	6	6
(China) Jin Lu (China) Z Yang	4	1
(China) F Liu (China) F Xun	3	3
(Israel) J Glushko (Sweden) R Peterson	6	6
(China) Q Wang (China) Q Ye	1	6	[8]
(China) S Xu (China) X You	6	3	[10]
(China) K Zhang (China) L Zhu
3	(China) C Liang (China) Y Wang	w/o
(Serbia) J Janković (Serbia) A Krunić	6	6
(India) A Raina (China) Y Zhang	4	1
(Georgia (country)) O Kalashnikova (Poland) K Piter	1	6	[8]
2	(Poland) K Jans-Ignacik (Australia) An Rodionova	6	1	[10]

Quarterfinals
1	(Switzerland) M Hingis (India) S Mirza	6	6
(Germany) A-L Friedsam (Romania) M Niculescu	2	3
4	(United Kingdom) J Rae (United Kingdom) A Smith	5	3
(Israel) J Glushko (Sweden) R Peterson	7	6
(China) S Xu (China) X You	6	6
3	(China) C Liang (China) Y Wang	3	4
(Serbia) J Janković (Serbia) A Krunić	4	4
2	(Poland) K Jans-Ignacik (Australia) An Rodionova	6	6

Semifinals
1	(Switzerland) M Hingis (India) S Mirza	6	6
(Israel) J Glushko (Sweden) R Peterson	3	4
(China) S Xu (China) X You	7^{7}	6
2	(Poland) K Jans-Ignacik (Australia) An Rodionova	6^{5}	3

Final
1	(Switzerland) M Hingis (India) S Mirza	6	6
(China) S Xu (China) X You	3	1
