= 2015 Guangzhou International Women's Open – Singles =

Singles
- 2015 Guangzhou International Women's Open

Final
- Champion: (Serbia) Jelena Janković
- Runner-up: (Czech Republic) Denisa Allertová
- Score: 6–2, 6–0

Details
- Draw: 32
- Seeds: 8

Events
Singles	Doubles
- Guangzhou International Women's Open

Monica Niculescu was the defending champion, but she lost in the quarterfinals to Yanina Wickmayer.

Fourth-seeded Jelena Janković won the title, defeating Denisa Allertová in the final 6–2, 6–0.

== Seeds ==
1. (Romania) Simona Halep (quarterfinals)
2. (Germany) Andrea Petkovic (first round)
3. (Italy) Sara Errani (semifinals)
4. (Serbia) Jelena Janković (champion)
5. (Russia) Svetlana Kuznetsova (quarterfinals)
6. (Romania) Monica Niculescu (quarterfinals)
7. (Montenegro) Danka Kovinić (first round)
8. (China) Zheng Saisai (quarterfinals)

== Draw ==
Key

- Q = Qualifier
- WC = Wild card
- LL = Lucky loser
- Alt = Alternate
- ITF = ITF entry
- PR = Protected ranking
- SR = Special ranking
- SE = Special exempt
- JE = Junior exempt
- JR = Junior Accelerator Programme entrant
- CO = College Accelerator Programme entrant
- NG = Next Gen Accelerator Program entrant
- w/o = Walkover
- r = Retired
- d = Defaulted

=== Finals ===
Semifinals
(Czech Republic) Denisa Allertová	7	6
3	(Italy) Sara Errani	5	2
4	(Serbia) Jelena Janković	6	2	7
(Belgium) Yanina Wickmayer	3	6	5

Final
(Czech Republic) Denisa Allertová	2	0
4	(Serbia) Jelena Janković	6	6

=== Top half ===
First round
1	(Romania) S Halep	6	6
Q	(Croatia) P Martić	4	2
WC	(China) Z Yang	3	0
(Hungary) T Babos	6	6
(Czech Republic) D Allertová	6	7^{7}
(Germany) A-L Friedsam	3	6^{3}
(Serbia) B Jovanovski	6	6
7	(Montenegro) D Kovinić	4	2
3	(Italy) S Errani	6	3	6
(China) Y Duan	3	6	2
Q	(Tunisia) O Jabeur	3	3
Q	(China) K Zhang	6	6
(Chinese Taipei) S-w Hsieh	1	3
Q	(Estonia) A Kontaveit	6	6
(Serbia) A Krunić	2	1
8	(China) S Zheng	6	6

Second round
1	(Romania) S Halep	6	6
(Hungary) T Babos	4	0
(Czech Republic) D Allertová	6	7^{7}
(Serbia) B Jovanovski	3	6^{5}
3	(Italy) S Errani	6^{6}	6	6
Q	(China) K Zhang	7^{8}	4	2
Q	(Estonia) A Kontaveit	1	6^{11}
8	(China) S Zheng	6	7^{13}

Quarterfinals
1	(Romania) S Halep	4	3
(Czech Republic) D Allertová	6	6
3	(Italy) S Errani	6	6
8	(China) S Zheng	1	0

Semifinals
(Czech Republic) D Allertová	7	6
3	(Italy) S Errani	5	2

=== Bottom half ===
First round
5	(Russia) S Kuznetsova	6	7
(Slovakia) D Hantuchová	4	5
Q	(China) Q Wang	3	2
(Poland) U Radwańska	6	6
WC	(China) S Zhang	4	4
(Italy) F Schiavone	6	6
(Russia) E Vesnina	6^{3}	3
4	(Serbia) J Janković	7^{7}	6
6	(Romania) M Niculescu	7^{7}	1	6
(Kazakhstan) Y Putintseva	6^{5}	6	3
WC	(China) Y Wang	3	6	4
Q	(Sweden) R Peterson	6	3	6
(Belgium) Y Wickmayer	6	6
(Poland) M Linette	4	4
(Puerto Rico) M Puig	6	6
2	(Germany) A Petkovic	1	4

Second round
5	(Russia) S Kuznetsova	6	6
(Poland) U Radwańska	0	1
(Italy) F Schiavone	5	6	4
4	(Serbia) J Janković	7	4	6
6	(Romania) M Niculescu	6	6
Q	(Sweden) R Peterson	3	2
(Belgium) Y Wickmayer	6	6
(Puerto Rico) M Puig	3	4

Quarterfinals
5	(Russia) S Kuznetsova	2	5
4	(Serbia) J Janković	6	7
6	(Romania) M Niculescu	2	2
(Belgium) Y Wickmayer	6	6

Semifinals
4	(Serbia) J Janković	6	2	7
(Belgium) Y Wickmayer	3	6	5

== Qualifying ==
=== Seeds ===
1. (Estonia) Anett Kontaveit (qualified)
2. (China) Wang Qiang (qualified)
3. (Croatia) Petra Martić (qualified)
4. (Israel) Julia Glushko (qualifying competition)
5. (China) Zhu Lin (qualifying competition)
6. (Sweden) Rebecca Peterson (qualified)
7. (Tunisia) Ons Jabeur (qualified)
8. (China) Liu Fangzhou (qualifying competition)
9. (China) Zhang Kailin (qualified)
10. (Poland) Katarzyna Piter (first round)
11. (India) Ankita Raina (first round)
12. (Australia) Anastasia Rodionova (qualifying competition)

=== Qualifiers ===
1. (Estonia) Anett Kontaveit
2. (China) Wang Qiang
3. (Croatia) Petra Martić
4. (China) Zhang Kailin
5. (Tunisia) Ons Jabeur
6. (Sweden) Rebecca Peterson

=== Qualifying draw ===
==== First qualifier ====
First round
1	(Estonia) Anett Kontaveit	6	6
WC	(Japan) Naoko Eto	0	1
(China) Xu Shilin	2	6	6
11	(India) Ankita Raina	6	4	2

Qualifying competition
1	(Estonia) Anett Kontaveit	6	6
(China) Xu Shilin	4	4

==== Second qualifier ====
First round
2	(China) Wang Qiang	6	6
(Japan) Mizuno Kijima	3	1
(China) Liang Chen	6	1	6
10	(Poland) Katarzyna Piter	2	6	3

Qualifying competition
2	(China) Wang Qiang	7	1	6
(China) Liang Chen	5	6	1

==== Third qualifier ====
First round
3	(Croatia) Petra Martić	6	6
(Russia) Anna Morgina	1	1
WC	(China) Wang Danni	1	0
8	(China) Liu Fangzhou	6	6

Qualifying competition
3	(Croatia) Petra Martić	4	7	6
8	(China) Liu Fangzhou	6	5	4

==== Fourth qualifier ====
First round
4	(Israel) Julia Glushko	6	6
WC	(China) Zhang Ying	2	0
(Georgia (country)) Oksana Kalashnikova	2	2
9	(China) Zhang Kailin	6	6

Qualifying competition
4	(Israel) Julia Glushko	6	2	1
9	(China) Zhang Kailin	2	6	6

==== Fifth qualifier ====
First round
5	(China) Zhu Lin	7^{7}	7
(China) Lu Jingjing	6^{3}	5
(China) Xun Fangying	0	2
7	(Tunisia) Ons Jabeur	6	6

Qualifying competition
5	(China) Zhu Lin	4	4
7	(Tunisia) Ons Jabeur	6	6

==== Sixth qualifier ====
First round
6	(Sweden) Rebecca Peterson	6	6
(China) You Xiaodi	2	1
(Hong Kong) Zhang Ling	1	2
12	(Australia) Anastasia Rodionova	6	6

Qualifying competition
6	(Sweden) Rebecca Peterson	6	7^{7}
12	(Australia) Anastasia Rodionova	3	6^{4}
