= 2016 Lale Cup – Doubles =

Doubles
- 2016 Lale Cup

Final
- Champions: (Uzbekistan) Nigina Abduraimova (Czech Republic) Barbora Štefková
- Runners-up: (Russia) Valentyna Ivakhnenko (Belarus) Lidziya Marozava
- Score: 6–4, 1–6, [10–6]

Events
Singles	Doubles
← 2015 ·	Lale Cup	· 2017 →

Lyudmyla Kichenok and Nadiia Kichenok were the defending champions, but both players chose not to participate.

The wildcard pairing of Nigina Abduraimova and Barbora Štefková won the title, defeating top seeds Valentyna Ivakhnenko and Lidziya Marozava in the final, 6–4, 1–6, [10–6].

== Seeds ==
1. (Russia) Valentyna Ivakhnenko / (Belarus) Lidziya Marozava (final)
2. (Georgia (country)) Sofia Shapatava / (Ukraine) Anastasiya Vasylyeva (quarterfinals)
3. (Czech Republic) Lenka Kunčíková / (Czech Republic) Karolína Stuchlá (semifinals)
4. (Turkey) Başak Eraydın / (Russia) Polina Monova (semifinals)

== Draw ==
=== Key ===
- Q = Qualifier
- WC = Wild card
- LL = Lucky loser
- Alt = Alternate
- SE = Special exempt
- PR = Protected ranking
- ITF = ITF entry
- JE = Junior exempt
- w/o = Walkover
- r = Retired
- d = Defaulted
- SR = Special ranking

First round
1	(Russia) V Ivakhnenko (Belarus) L Marozava	6	6
(Slovenia) N Kolar (Slovenia) T Majerič	2	2
WC	(Turkey) C Anıl (Turkey) D Yurtkuran	3	3
(Russia) N Dzalamidze (Russia) A Komardina	6	6
4	(Turkey) B Eraydın (Russia) P Monova	6	6
(Romania) E Bogdan (Romania) C Dinu	1	3
WC	(Turkey) B Akbaş (Turkey) S Övünç	1	3
(Poland) K Piter (Bulgaria) I Shinikova	6	6
(Ukraine) A Fomina (Russia) E Yashina	6^{6}	6	[13]
(China) J Lu (Ukraine) V Strakhova	7^{8}	2	[11]
(North Macedonia) L Gjorcheska (Turkey) P Özgen	3	7^{7}	[3]
3	(Czech Republic) L Kunčíková (Czech Republic) K Stuchlá	6	6^{1}	[10]
WC	(Uzbekistan) N Abduraimova (Czech Republic) B Štefková	6	6
(Italy) M Caregaro (Hungary) R-L Jani	3	4
(Sweden) C Lister (India) A Raina	2	3
2	(Georgia (country)) S Shapatava (Ukraine) A Vasylyeva	6	6

Quarterfinals
1	(Russia) V Ivakhnenko (Belarus) L Marozava	7	6
(Russia) N Dzalamidze (Russia) A Komardina	5	3
4	(Turkey) B Eraydın (Russia) P Monova	6	6
(Poland) K Piter (Bulgaria) I Shinikova	3	3
(Ukraine) A Fomina (Russia) E Yashina	4	6	[5]
3	(Czech Republic) L Kunčíková (Czech Republic) K Stuchlá	6	3	[10]
WC	(Uzbekistan) N Abduraimova (Czech Republic) B Štefková	7^{7}	6
2	(Georgia (country)) S Shapatava (Ukraine) A Vasylyeva	6^{5}	2

Semifinals
1	(Russia) V Ivakhnenko (Belarus) L Marozava	6	7
4	(Turkey) B Eraydın (Russia) P Monova	2	5
3	(Czech Republic) L Kunčíková (Czech Republic) K Stuchlá	4	2
WC	(Uzbekistan) N Abduraimova (Czech Republic) B Štefková	6	6

Final
1	(Russia) V Ivakhnenko (Belarus) L Marozava	4	6	[6]
WC	(Uzbekistan) N Abduraimova (Czech Republic) B Štefková	6	1	[10]
