= 2016 Lale Cup – Singles =

Singles
- 2016 Lale Cup

Final
- Champion: (Czech Republic) Barbora Štefková
- Runner-up: (Russia) Anastasia Pivovarova
- Score: 7–5, 2–6, 6–1

Events
Singles	Doubles
← 2015 ·	Lale Cup	· 2017 →

Shahar Pe'er is the defending champion, but chose not to participate this year.

Barbora Štefková, won the title, defeating Anastasia Pivovarova in the final, 7–5, 2–6, 6–1.

== Seeds ==
1. (Chinese Taipei) Hsieh Su-wei (first round)
2. (Serbia) Ivana Jorović (second round)
3. (Russia) Polina Leykina (second round)
4. (China) Lu Jiajing (second round)
5. (Russia) Anastasiya Komardina (first round)
6. (Uzbekistan) Nigina Abduraimova (second round)
7. (Romania) Cristina Dinu (quarterfinals)
8. (Hungary) Réka-Luca Jani (first round)

== Draw ==
=== Key ===
- Q = Qualifier
- WC = Wild card
- LL = Lucky loser
- Alt = Alternate
- SE = Special exempt
- PR = Protected ranking
- ITF = ITF entry
- JE = Junior exempt
- w/o = Walkover
- r = Retired
- d = Defaulted
- SR = Special ranking

=== Finals ===
Semifinals
Q	(Russia) Viktoria Kamenskaya	1	6	2
(Russia) Anastasia Pivovarova	6	3	6
Q	(North Macedonia) Lina Gjorcheska	3	3
(Czech Republic) Barbora Štefková	6	6

Final
(Russia) Anastasia Pivovarova	5	6	1
(Czech Republic) Barbora Štefková	7	2	6

=== Top half ===
First round
1	(Chinese Taipei) S-w Hsieh	3	3
(Bulgaria) I Shinikova	6	6
WC	(Turkey) S Övünç	2	1
(Georgia (country)) S Shapatava	6	6
(Ukraine) V Strakhova	7^{7}	6
(Russia) E Alexandrova	6^{3}	3
Q	(Russia) V Kamenskaya	6	6
8	(Hungary) R-L Jani	2	3
4	(China) J Lu	6	3	6
(Russia) V Ivakhnenko	1	6	1
(Ukraine) O Fridman	6	6
WC	(Turkey) P Özgen	3	3
(Poland) K Piter	4	6	4
(Russia) A Pivovarova	6	2	6
(Russia) N Dzalamidze	6	7
5	(Russia) A Komardina	3	5

Second round
(Bulgaria) I Shinikova	2	6	6
(Georgia (country)) S Shapatava	6	3	3
(Ukraine) V Strakhova	6	3	4
Q	(Russia) V Kamenskaya	1	6	6
4	(China) J Lu	0	6	6^{4}
(Ukraine) O Fridman	6	4	7^{7}
(Russia) A Pivovarova	6	6
(Russia) N Dzalamidze	4	2

Quarterfinals
(Bulgaria) I Shinikova	6^{4}	4
Q	(Russia) V Kamenskaya	7^{7}	6
(Ukraine) O Fridman	2	6	3
(Russia) A Pivovarova	6	0	6

Semifinals
Q	(Russia) V Kamenskaya	1	6	2
(Russia) A Pivovarova	6	3	6

=== Bottom half ===
First round
7	(Romania) C Dinu	6	6
WC	(Turkey) B Akbaş	2	0
(Italy) M Caregaro	6^{2}	5
Q	(Austria) P König	7^{7}	7
Q	(North Macedonia) L Gjorcheska	6	5	7^{7}
Q	(United Kingdom) F Christie	4	7	6^{4}
WC	(Turkey) İ Öğüt	6^{2}	1
3	(Russia) P Leykina	7^{7}	6
6	(Uzbekistan) N Abduraimova	6	6
(France) F Ferro	4	3
(Slovenia) T Majerič	5	2
(Romania) A Cadanțu	7	6
(Czech Republic) B Štefková	6	6
(Turkey) B Eraydın	3	0
(Croatia) A Vrljić	1	1
2	(Serbia) I Jorović	6	6

Second round
7	(Romania) C Dinu	6	6
Q	(Austria) P König	3	2
Q	(North Macedonia) L Gjorcheska	1	7	7^{7}
3	(Russia) P Leykina	6	5	6^{2}
6	(Uzbekistan) N Abduraimova	4	2
(Romania) A Cadanțu	6	6
(Czech Republic) B Štefková	7^{7}	5	6
2	(Serbia) I Jorović	6^{0}	7	3

Quarterfinals
7	(Romania) C Dinu	6	3	4
Q	(North Macedonia) L Gjorcheska	1	6	6
(Romania) A Cadanțu	2	1^{r}
(Czech Republic) B Štefková	6	3

Semifinals
Q	(North Macedonia) L Gjorcheska	3	3
(Czech Republic) B Štefková	6	6
