= 2016 Lale Cup =

- Date: 11–17 April
- Edition: 4th
- Category: ITF Women's Circuit
- Prize money: $50,000
- Surface: Hard
- Location: Istanbul, Turkey

Champions

Singles
- (Czech Republic) Barbora Štefková

Doubles
- (Uzbekistan) Nigina Abduraimova / (Czech Republic) Barbora Štefková
- Lale Cup

The 2016 Lale Cup was a professional tennis tournament played on outdoor hard courts. It was the fourth edition of the tournament and part of the 2016 ITF Women's Circuit, offering a total of $50,000 in prize money. It took place in Istanbul, Turkey, on 11–17 April 2016.

== Singles main draw entrants ==
=== Seeds ===
Country	Player	Rank^{1}	Seed
TPE	Hsieh Su-wei	81	1
SRB	Ivana Jorović	151	2
RUS	Polina Leykina	189	3
CHN	Lu Jiajing	198	4
RUS	Anastasiya Komardina	216	5
UZB	Nigina Abduraimova	217	6
ROU	Cristina Dinu	222	7
HUN	Réka-Luca Jani	225	8

- ^{1} Rankings as of 4 April 2016.

=== Other entrants ===
The following players received wildcards into the singles main draw:

- (Turkey) Başak Akbaş
- (Turkey) İnci Öğüt
- (Turkey) Selin Övünç
- (Turkey) Pemra Özgen

The following players received entry from the qualifying draw:

- (United Kingdom) Freya Christie
- (North Macedonia) Lina Gjorcheska
- (Russia) Viktoria Kamenskaya
- (Austria) Pia König

== Champions ==
=== Singles ===
- (Czech Republic) Barbora Štefková def. (Russia) Anastasia Pivovarova, 7–5, 2–6, 6–1

=== Doubles ===
- (Uzbekistan) Nigina Abduraimova / (Czech Republic) Barbora Štefková def. (Russia) Valentyna Ivakhnenko / (Belarus) Lidziya Marozava, 6–4, 1–6, [10–6]
