= Elizaveta Kulichkova =

Russian tennis player

Elizaveta Kulichkova Елизавета Куличкова
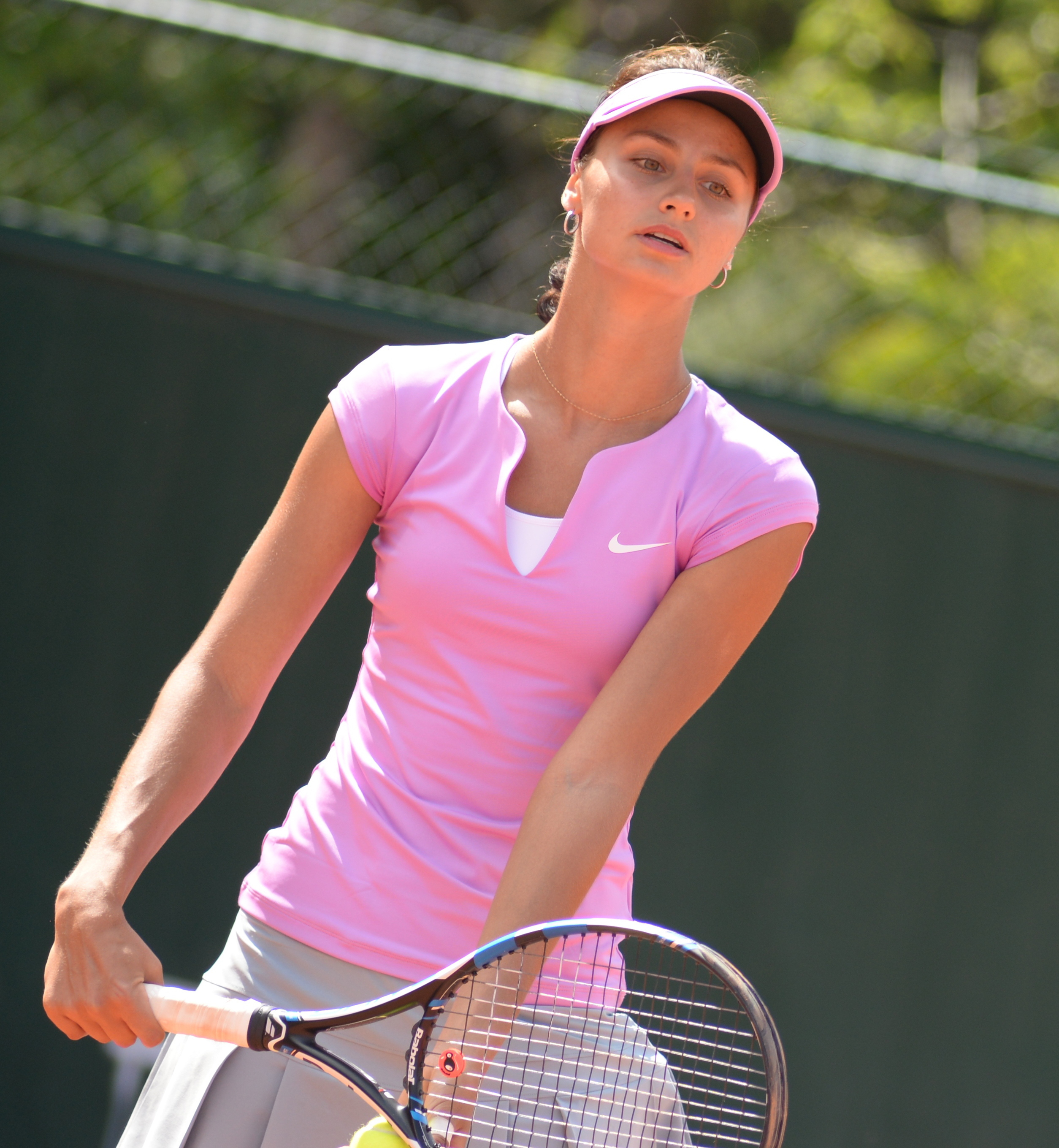
- Kulichkova at Roland Garros, 2015
- Full name: Elizaveta Dmitrievna Kulichkova
- Country (sports): Russia
- Born: 12 April 1996 (age 29) Novosibirsk, Russia
- Height: 1.76 m (5 ft 9 1/2 in)
- Plays: Right-handed
- Prize money: US$ 481,929

Singles
- Career record: 156–89
- Career titles: 7 ITF
- Highest ranking: No. 87 (22 February 2016)

Grand Slam singles results
- Australian Open: 3R (2016)
- French Open: Q2 (2015)
- Wimbledon: 2R (2015)
- US Open: 1R (2015)

Doubles
- Career record: 14–16
- Career titles: 0
- Highest ranking: No. 312 (18 April 2016)

Grand Slam doubles results
- Wimbledon: 1R (2015)

Elizaveta Dmitrievna Kulichkova (Russian: Елизавета Дмитриевна Куличкова; born 12 April 1996) is a Russian former tennis player. She competed for her last pro match at the 2017 US Open.

In her career, she won seven singles titles on the ITF Circuit. On 22 February 2016, she reached her best singles ranking of world No. 87.

Kulichkova was ranked the No. 3 junior tennis player in the world in May 2012, and in January 2014, won the girls' singles and doubles events at the Australian Open.

== Career ==
Kulichkova made her WTA Tour main-draw debut at the 2014 İstanbul Cup as a qualifier. Having defeated Nadiia Kichenok and Melinda Czink in the preliminary rounds, she lost to Shahar Pe'er in round one. Further first-round exits followed in Hong Kong and Seoul before once again coming through qualifying in Tianjin where she defeated Sílvia Soler Espinosa, before losing to Peng Shuai in the second round.

Kulichkova made her major debut at the 2015 Wimbledon Championships by defeating Yanina Wickmayer (3–6, 7–6, 10–8), before losing to eventual quarterfinalist Madison Keys in the second round (4–6, 6–7). Then, she reached semifinals in Bursa. In the first round at Baku, she was close to defeat top-seeded Anastasia Pavlyuchenkova but she lost the final tie-breaker.

For the first time Kulichkova was nominated for the Russia Fed Cup team in 2016 in the World Group play-offs against Belarus. She should have played the last dead rubber with Elena Vesnina, but she was replaced by Daria Kasatkina.

== Grand Slam performance timelines ==
=== Singles ===
	Australian Open	Roland Garros	Wimbledon	US Open
2017	R128	-	-	-
2016	R32	-	-	-
2015	-	-	R64	R128

== ITF Circuit finals ==
=== Singles: 9 (7 titles, 2 runner–ups) ===
Legend $50,000 tournaments $25,000 tournaments $10,000 tournaments	Finals by surface Hard (5–2) Clay (2–0)

Result	W–L	Date	Tournament	Tier	Surface	Opponent	Score
Win	1–0	Apr 2012	ITF Antalya, Turkey	10,000	Hard	(Slovenia) Dalila Jakupović	7–5, 6–2
Loss	1–1	Apr 2013	Lale Cup Istanbul, Turkey	50,000	Hard	(Croatia) Donna Vekić	4–6, 6–7^{(4)}
Win	2–1	Jul 2013	ITF Istanbul, Turkey	25,000	Hard	(Ukraine) Kateryna Kozlova	6–3, 4–6, 6–0
Win	3–1	Dec 2013	ITF Hong Kong	25,000	Hard	(Kazakhstan) Zarina Diyas	6–2, 6–2
Loss	3–2	Jan 2014	Burnie International, Australia	50,000	Hard	(Japan) Misa Eguchi	6–4, 2–6, 3–6
Win	4–2	Jun 2014	ITF Lenzerheide, Switzerland	25,000	Clay	(United States) Louisa Chirico	7–5, 6–2
Win	5–2	Oct 2014	ITF Bangkok, Thailand	25,000	Hard	(Netherlands) Lesley Kerkhove	6–1, 6–0
Win	6–2	Mar 2015	Blossom Cup, China	50,000	Hard	(Latvia) Jeļena Ostapenko	6–1, 5–7, 7–5
Win	7–2	Jul 2016	ITS Cup, Czech Republic	50,000	Clay	(Russia) Ekaterina Alexandrova	4–6, 6–2, 6–1

=== Doubles: 1 (runner–up) ===
Result	W–L	Date	Tournament	Tier	Surface	Partner	Opponents	Score
Loss	0–1	Nov 2013	ITF Bucha, Ukraine	25,000	Carpet (i)	(Ukraine) Anhelina Kalinina	(Georgia (country)) Sofia Shapatava (Ukraine) Anastasiya Vasylyeva	6–7^{(4)}, 2–6

== Junior Grand Slam tournament finals ==
=== Girls' singles: 1 (title) ===
Result	Year	Tournament	Surface	Opponent	Score
Win	2014	Australian Open	Hard	(Croatia) Jana Fett	6–2, 6–1

=== Girls' doubles: 1 (title) ===
Result	Year	Tournament	Surface	Partner	Opponents	Score
Win	2014	Australian Open	Hard	(Ukraine) Anhelina Kalinina	(United Kingdom) Katie Boulter (Serbia) Ivana Jorović	6–4, 6–2
