= Denisa Šátralová =

Czech tennis player (born 1993)

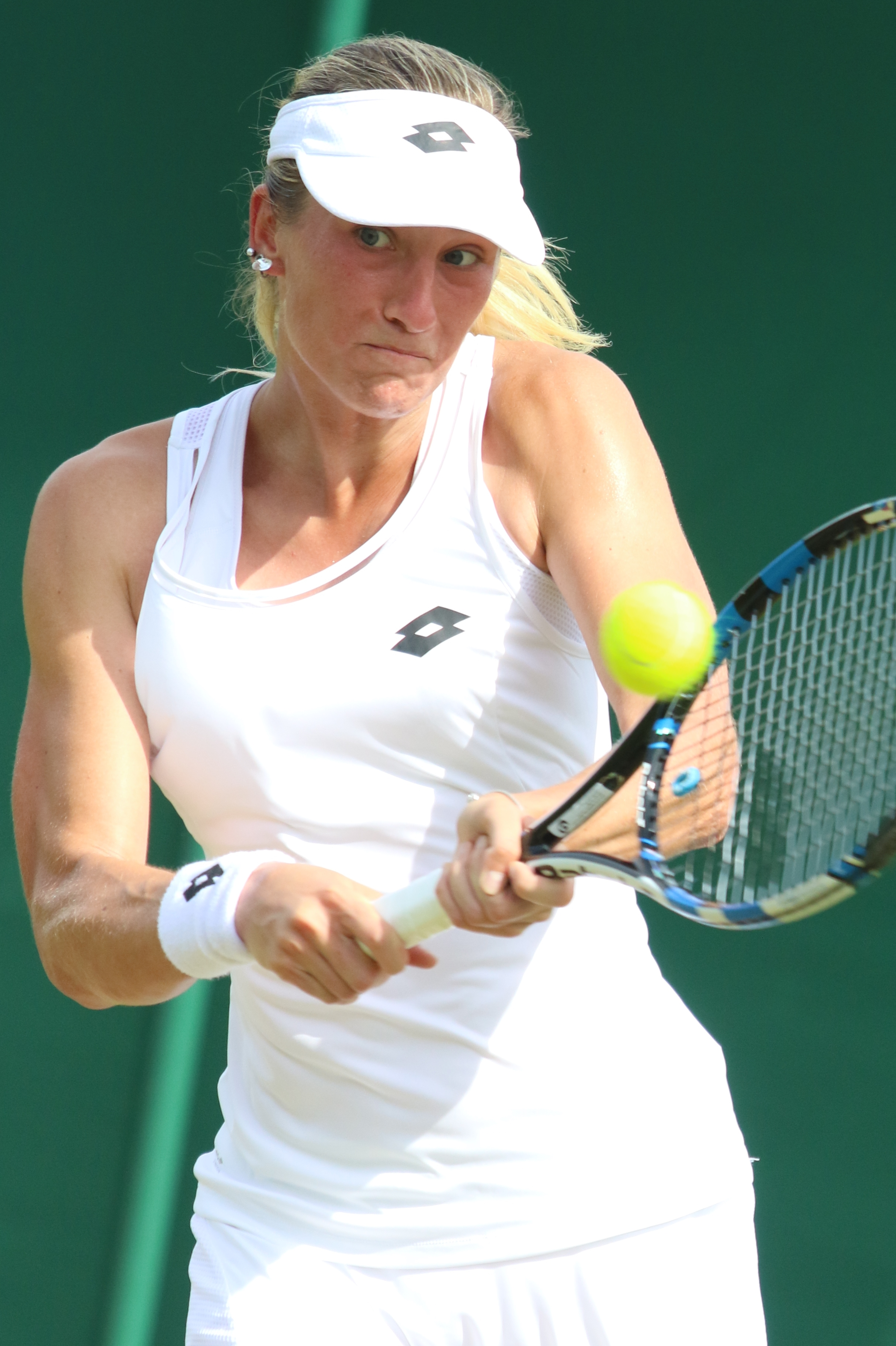
- Šátralová at the 2017 Wimbledon
- Country (sports): Czech Republic
- Born: 7 March 1993 (age 33) Prague, Czech Republic
- Height: 1.80 m (5 ft 11 in)
- Coach: Jan Prihoda
- Prize money: US$ 1,494,786

Singles
- Career record: 249–155
- Career titles: 10 ITF
- Highest ranking: No. 55 (21 March 2016)

Grand Slam singles results
- Australian Open: 4R (2018)
- French Open: 2R (2015)
- Wimbledon: 2R (2015, 2016, 2017)
- US Open: 2R (2015, 2016, 2017)

Doubles
- Career record: 39–40
- Career titles: 2 ITF
- Highest ranking: No. 291 (1 August 2016)

Grand Slam doubles results
- Australian Open: 1R (2016)
- French Open: 1R (2015)
- Wimbledon: 1R (2016)
- US Open: 1R (2015, 2016)

Denisa Šátralová (née Allertová; born 7 March 1993) is a Czech former professional tennis player.

Šátralová won 10 singles and two doubles titles on the ITF Circuit in her career. On 21 March 2016, she reached her best singles ranking of world No. 55. On 1 August 2016, she peaked at No. 291 in the doubles rankings.

She reached one WTA Tour final at the 2015 Guangzhou International Women's Open, losing to Jelena Janković.

Playing for the Czech Republic Fed Cup team, she has a win–loss record of 1–0.

== Personal life ==
Šátralová was born in Prague. In August 2019, she married her long time boyfriend Jan Šátral just outside Prague. On 18 November 2019, she switched to being named Denisa Šátralová.

== Grand Slam performance timeline ==
Key
W	F	SF	QF	#R	RR	Q#	P#	DNQ	A	Z#	PO	G	S	B	NMS	NTI	P	NH

(W) winner; (F) finalist; (SF) semifinalist; (QF) quarterfinalist; (#R) rounds 4, 3, 2, 1; (RR) round-robin stage; (Q#) qualification round; (P#) preliminary round; (DNQ) did not qualify; (A) absent; (Z#) Davis/Fed Cup Zonal Group (with number indication) or (PO) play-off; (G) gold, (S) silver or (B) bronze Olympic/Paralympic medal; (NMS) not a Masters tournament; (NTI) not a Tier I tournament; (P) postponed; (NH) not held; (SR) strike rate (events won / competed); (W–L) win–loss record.
To avoid confusion and double counting, these charts are updated at the conclusion of a tournament or when the player's participation has ended.

=== Singles ===
Tournament	2014	2015	2016	2017	2018	2019	2020	SR	W–L
Australian Open	A	2R	3R	1R	4R	Q1	Q2	0 / 4	6–4
French Open	A	2R	1R	A	1R	Q1	A	0 / 3	1–3
Wimbledon	A	2R	2R	2R	1R	A	NH	0 / 4	3–4
US Open	Q2	2R	2R	2R	A	1R	A	0 / 4	3–4
Win–loss	0–0	4–4	4–4	2–3	3–3	0–1	0–0	0 / 15	13–15
Career statistics
Year-end ranking	110	63	95	122	160	226	249	$1,494,786	

== WTA Tour finals ==
=== Singles: 1 (runner–up) ===
Legend Grand Slam tournaments Premier M & Premier 5 Premier International (0–1)	Finals by surface Hard (0–1) Clay (0–0) Grass (0–0) Carpet (0–0)

Result	W–L	Date	Tournament	Tier	Surface	Opponent	Score
Loss	0–1	Sep 2015	Guangzhou Open, China	International	Hard	(Serbia) Jelena Janković	2–6, 0–6

== ITF Circuit finals ==
=== Singles: 17 (10 titles, 7 runner–ups) ===
Legend $75,000 tournaments $50,000 tournaments $25,000 tournaments $10,000 tournaments	Finals by surface Hard (5–2) Clay (5–5)

Result	W–L	Date	Tournament	Tier	Surface	Opponent	Score
Loss	0–1	Aug 2011	ITF Piešťany, Slovakia	10,000	Clay	(Sweden) Hilda Melander	3–6, 3–6
Win	1–1	Dec 2012	ITF Antalya, Turkey	10,000	Clay	(Serbia) Natalija Kostić	5–7, 7–5, 6–1
Win	2–1	Jan 2013	ITF Sharm El Sheikh, Egypt	10,000	Hard	(Russia) Eugeniya Pashkova	6–2, 4–6, 7–6^{(1)}
Win	3–1	Mar 2014	ITF Antalya, Turkey	10,000	Hard	(Czech Republic) Barbora Krejčíková	6–3, 6–2
Win	4–1	Mar 2014	ITF Antalya, Turkey	10,000	Hard	(Netherlands) Bibiane Schoofs	6–4, 6–3
Win	5–1	Apr 2014	Lale Cup Istanbul, Turkey	50,000	Hard	(Ukraine) Yuliya Beygelzimer	6–2, 6–3
Win	6–1	Jun 2014	ITF Budapest, Hungary	25,000	Clay	(Croatia) Adrijana Lekaj	7–6^{(8–6)}, 7–6^{(7–3)}
Win	7–1	Jun 2014	ITF Siófok, Hungary	25,000	Clay	(Czech Republic) Martina Borecká	6–2, 6–3
Loss	7–2	Jul 2014	ITS Cup Olomouc, Czech Republic	50,000	Clay	(Czech Republic) Petra Cetkovská	6–3, 1–6, 4–6
Win	8–2	Jul 2014	ITF Plzeň, Czech Republic	25,000	Clay	(Ukraine) Anastasiya Vasylyeva	6–1, 6–1
Win	9–2	Sep 2014	ITF Alphen aan den Rijn, Netherlands	25,000	Clay	(Brazil) Teliana Pereira	6–3, ret.
Loss	9–3	Aug 2015	ITF Prague Open, Czech Republic	75,000	Clay	(Spain) María Teresa Torró Flor	3–6, 6–7^{(5)}
Loss	9–4	Nov 2016	ITF Bratislava, Slovakia	25,000	Hard (i)	(Romania) Andreea Mitu	2–6, 3–6
Win	10–4	Mar 2017	Zhuhai Open, China	60,000	Hard	(China) Zheng Saisai	6–3, 2–6, 6–4
Loss	10–5	Feb 2019	Trnava Indoor, Slovakia	25,000	Hard (i)	(Bulgaria) Isabella Shinikova	1–6, 3–6
Loss	10–6	Jun 2019	Macha Lake Open, Czech Republic	60,000	Clay	(Czech Republic) Barbora Krejčíková	2–6, 3–6
Loss	10–7	Jul 2019	ITF Prague Open, Czech Republic	60,000	Clay	(Germany) Tamara Korpatsch	5–7, 3–6

=== Doubles: 3 (2 titles, 1 runner–up) ===
Legend $25,000 tournaments $10,000 tournaments	Finals by surface Hard (1–0) Clay (1–1)

Result	W–L	Date	Tournament	Tier	Surface	Partner	Opponents	Score
Loss	0–1	Oct 2012	ITF Solin, Croatia	10,000	Clay	(Belgium) Michaela Boev	(Slovakia) Lenka Juríková (Slovakia) Chantal Škamlová	5–7, 4–6
Win	1–1	Mar 2014	ITF Antalya, Turkey	10,000	Hard	(Slovakia) Chantal Škamlová	(Turkey) Melis Sezer (Turkey) İpek Soylu	6–2, 6–1
Win	2–1	Jun 2014	ITF Siófok, Hungary	25,000	Clay	(Slovakia) Chantal Škamlová	(Czech Republic) Martina Borecká (Czech Republic) Petra Krejsová	6–1, 6–3

== Record against other players ==
#	Player	Rank	Event	Surface	Rd	Score
2015
1.	(Spain) Carla Suárez Navarro	No. 10	US Open, United States	Hard	1R	6–1, 7–6^{(5)}
2.	(Romania) Simona Halep	No. 2	Guangzhou Open, China	Hard	QF	6–4, 6–3
2016
3.	(Germany) Angelique Kerber	No. 2	Indian Wells Open, U.S.	Hard	2R	7–5, 7–5
