= Lale Cup =

- 2019 Lale Cup

ITF Women's Tour
- Event name: Istanbul
- Location: Istanbul, Turkey
- Venue: Maltepe Sahil Spor Tesisi
- Category: ITF $60,000
- Surface: Hard
- Draw: 32S/32Q/16D
- Prize money: $60,000

The Lale Cup was a tournament for professional female tennis players who played on outdoor hardcourts. The event was classified as a $60,000 ITF Women's Circuit tournament and was held in Istanbul, Turkey, annually, from 2013 to 2019.

== Past finals ==
=== Singles ===
Year	Champion	Runner-up	Score
2019	(Russia) Vitalia Diatchenko	(India) Ankita Raina	6–4, 6–0
2018	(Uzbekistan) Sabina Sharipova	(Russia) Elena Rybakina	7–6^{(7–0)}, 6–4
2017	(Turkey) Başak Eraydın	(Czech Republic) Petra Krejsová	6–3, 6–0
2016	(Czech Republic) Barbora Štefková	(Russia) Anastasia Pivovarova	7–5, 2–6, 6–1
2015	(Israel) Shahar Pe'er	(Czech Republic) Kristýna Plíšková	1–6, 7–6^{(7–4)}, 7–5
2014	(Czech Republic) Denisa Allertová	(Ukraine) Yuliya Beygelzimer	6–2, 6–3
2013	(Croatia) Donna Vekić	(Russia) Elizaveta Kulichkova	6–4, 7–6^{(7–4)}

=== Doubles ===
Year	Champions	Runners-up	Score
2019	(Czech Republic) Marie Bouzková (Netherlands) Rosalie van der Hoek	(Belarus) Ilona Kremen (Belarus) Iryna Shymanovich	7–5, 6–7^{(2–7)}, [10–5]
2018	(Turkey) Ayla Aksu (United Kingdom) Harriet Dart	(Russia) Olga Doroshina (Russia) Anastasia Potapova	6–4, 7–6^{(7–3)}
2017	(Russia) Veronika Kudermetova (Turkey) İpek Soylu	(Russia) Ksenia Lykina (Russia) Polina Monova	4–6, 7–5, [11–9]
2016	(Uzbekistan) Nigina Abduraimova (Czech Republic) Barbora Štefková	(Russia) Valentyna Ivakhnenko (Belarus) Lidziya Marozava	6–4, 1–6, [10–6]
2015	(Ukraine) Lyudmyla Kichenok (Ukraine) Nadiia Kichenok	(Russia) Valentyna Ivakhnenko (Russia) Polina Monova	6–4, 6–3
2014	(Czech Republic) Petra Krejsová (Czech Republic) Tereza Smitková	(Netherlands) Michaëlla Krajicek (Serbia) Aleksandra Krunić	1–6, 7–6^{(7–2)}, [11–9]
2013	(Russia) Ekaterina Bychkova (Ukraine) Nadiya Kichenok	(Turkey) Başak Eraydın (Bulgaria) Aleksandrina Naydenova	3–6, 6–2, [10–5]
