= Hülya Esen =

Turkish tennis player and coach

- Country (sports): Bulgaria, Turkey
- Born: 7 August 1989 (age 36) Istanbul, Turkey
- Turned pro: 2003
- Retired: 2024 (last match played)
- Plays: Right-handed (two-handed backhand)
- Prize money: $53,787

Singles
- Career titles: 0
- Highest ranking: No. 504 (9 July 2012)

Doubles
- Career titles: 6 ITF
- Highest ranking: No. 406 (11 November 2013)

Hülya Esen, Хюлия Велиева (born 7 August 1989) is a Turkish-Bulgarian former professional tennis player. Esen won six ITF doubles titles and reached career-high WTA rankings of No. 504 in singles (on 9 July 2012) and No. 406 in doubles (on 11 November 2013). She was the No. 1 player in the Bulgaria national rankings for seven consecutive years. She represented team Bulgaria until 2011, before switching her representation to play in the Turkey team competitions.

== Personal life ==
Her parents are from Turkish origin from Kardzhali, Bulgaria, and her ancestors came from Konya. Her mother Nebahat Velieva (maiden name Sadakova) is from Ardino, Kardzhali Province, Bulgaria and has been her coach, managing her and her sister's Lütfiye careers. She has dual Bulgarian and Turkish citizenship.

== Career ==
Esen made her WTA Tour main-draw debut at the 2008 Gastein Ladies in the doubles event, partnering Stefanie Haidner. She also played in the doubles event of the 2010 İstanbul Cup, partnering Derya Turhan.

She played her last match on the ITF Circuit in September 2024.

Together with her sister Lütfiye, they were 12 times women's doubles champions of Bulgaria. Hülya is in an 18 times champion of Bulgaria, in singles, doubles, and mixed doubles. She is the first and was the only triple champion of Bulgaria (till 2021), that have won all singles, doubles and mixed doubles competitions in one championship.

== ITF Circuit finals ==
=== Singles: 2 (2 runner–ups) ===
Legend $10,000 tournaments	Finals by surface Hard (0–2)

Result	W–L	Date	Tournament	Tier	Surface	Opponent	Score
Loss	0–1	May 2011	ITF Gaziantep, Turkey	10,000	Hard	(Turkey) Melis Sezer	2–6, 1–6
Loss	0–2	Apr 2012	ITF Antalya, Turkey	10,000	Hard	(United States) Nicole Melichar	4–6, 3–6

=== Doubles: 18 (6 titles, 12 runner–ups) ===
Legend $25,000 tournaments $10,000 tournaments	Finals by surface Hard (2–3) Clay (4–9)

Result	W–L	Date	Tournament	Tier	Surface	Partner	Opponents	Score
Loss	0–1	Sep 2007	ITF Palić, Serbia	10,000	Clay	(Bulgaria) Lütfiye Esen	(Slovakia) Martina Babáková (Belgium) Davinia Lobbinger	2–6, 3–6
Win	1–1	May 2008	ITF Adana, Turkey	10,000	Clay	(Bulgaria) Lütfiye Esen	(Russia) Julia Efremova (Russia) Diana Isaeva	5–7, 6–1, [10–4]
Loss	1–2	Oct 2009	ITF Dobrich, Bulgaria	10,000	Clay	(Bulgaria) Lütfiye Esen	(Romania) Diana Marcu (Romania) Simona Matei	5–7, 6–4, [5–10]
Loss	1–3	Oct 2010	ITF Dobrich, Bulgaria	10,000	Clay	(Bulgaria) Lütfiye Esen	(Romania) Camelia Hristea (Romania) Ionela-Andreea Iova	0–6, 6–2, [6–10]
Win	2–3	Sep 2011	ITF Antalya, Turkey	10,000	Hard	(Turkey) Lütfiye Esen	(Portugal) Magali de Lattre (Germany) Christina Shakovets	7–5, 7–5
Loss	2–4	Sep 2011	ITF Adana, Turkey	10,000	Hard	(Turkey) Lütfiye Esen	(Czech Republic) Nikola Fraňková (United States) Hsu Chieh-yu	6–7^{(4)}, 4–6
Win	3–4	Oct 2011	ITF Antalya, Turkey	10,000	Clay	(Turkey) Lütfiye Esen	(Ukraine) Khristina Kazimova (United Kingdom) Francesca Stephenson	6–4, 6–2
Win	4–4	Dec 2011	ITF Antalya, Turkey	10,000	Clay	(Turkey) Lütfiye Esen	(Romania) Laura Ioana Paar (Romania) Raluca Elena Platon	6–0, 1–6, [10–7]
Loss	4–5	Feb 2012	ITF Antalya, Turkey	10,000	Clay	(Turkey) Seda Arantekin	(Romania) Diana Enache (Netherlands) Daniëlle Harmsen	6–7^{(5)}, 1–6
Win	5–5	Apr 2012	ITF Antalya, Turkey	10,000	Hard	(Turkey) Lütfiye Esen	(China) Lu Jiaxiang (China) Lu Jiajing	1–6, 6–4, [10–8]
Win	6–5	Jun 2012	ITF Niš, Serbia	10,000	Clay	(Turkey) Lütfiye Esen	(North Macedonia) Lina Gjorcheska (Russia) Maria Mokh	3–6, 7–6^{(2)}, [10–6]
Loss	6–6	Jul 2012	ITF Prokuplje, Serbia	10,000	Clay	(Turkey) Lütfiye Esen	(North Macedonia) Lina Gjorcheska (Bulgaria) Dalia Zafirova	3–6, 2–6
Loss	6–7	Nov 2012	ITF Antalya, Turkey	10,000	Clay	(Turkey) Lütfiye Esen	(Romania) Diana Buzean (Netherlands) Daniëlle Harmsen	6–4, 1–6, [3–10]
Loss	6–8	Nov 2012	ITF Antalya, Turkey	10,000	Clay	(Turkey) Lütfiye Esen	(Romania) Laura Ioana Andrei (Romania) Raluca Elena Platon	4–6, 6–3, [7–10]
Loss	6–9	Jul 2013	ITF Izmir, Turkey	10,000	Hard	(Turkey) Lütfiye Esen	(Turkey) Başak Eraydın (Slovakia) Zuzana Zlochová	1–6, 3–6
Loss	6–10	Aug 2013	ITF Izmir, Turkey	10,000	Hard	(Turkey) Lütfiye Esen	(Estonia) Anett Kontaveit (Russia) Polina Leykina	4–6, 5–7
Loss	6–11	Jul 2014	ITF Prokuplje, Serbia	10,000	Clay	(Turkey) Lütfiye Esen	(North Macedonia) Lina Gjorcheska (Australia) Alexandra Nancarrow	2–6, 4–6
Loss	6–12	Jul 2016	ITF Prokuplje, Serbia	10,000	Clay	(Turkey) Lütfiye Esen	(Russia) Veronika Miroshnichenko (Russia) Valeriya Zeleva	5–7, 1–6

=== ITF Junior Circuit finals ===
==== Singles: 3 (3 runner–ups) ====
Result	W–L	Date	Tournament	Grade	Surface	Opponent	Score
Loss	0–1	May 2005	Plovdiv, Bulgaria	G5	Clay	(Estonia) Anna Maskaljun	2–6, 7–5, 1–6
Loss	0–2	May 2005	Istanbul, Turkey	G5	Hard	(United Kingdom) Nikki Prosser	1–6, 6–7^{(4)}
Loss	0–3	Aug 2005	Skopje, Macedonia	G5	Clay	(Bulgaria) Lütfiye Esen	2–6, 0–2 ret.

==== Doubles: 4 (4 titles) ====
Result	W–L	Date	Tournament	Grade	Surface	Partner	Opponents	Score
Win	1–0	May 2004	Istanbul, Turkey	G5	Hard	(Turkey) Gözde Ünkaya	(Moldova) Ina Sireţeanu (Moldova) Gabriela Stepa	6–4, 6–0
Win	2–0	Sep 2004	Sofia, Bulgaria	G5	Clay	(Bulgaria) Lütfiye Esen	(Romania) Ioana-Alexandra Bara (Romania) Nicoleta-Ana Maria Bara	6–0, 6–4
Win	3–0	May 2005	Istanbul, Turkey	G5	Hard	(Bulgaria) Lütfiye Esen	(Turkey) Eylül Benli (Russia) Valeria Savinykh	7–6^{(5)}, 4–6, 6–4
Win	4–0	Aug 2005	Skopje, Macedonia	G5	Clay	(Bulgaria) Lütfiye Esen	(Serbia and Montenegro) Nives Pavlovic (Serbia and Montenegro) Nevena Selaković	6–4, 6–1
