= Melis Sezer =

Turkish tennis player

- Country (sports): Turkey
- Residence: Istanbul
- Born: 2 June 1993 (age 33) İzmir, Turkey
- Height: 1.68 m (5 ft 6 in)
- Retired: March 2025
- Plays: Right-handed (two-handed backhand)
- Prize money: $139,514

Singles
- Career record: 336–280
- Career titles: 9 ITF
- Highest ranking: No. 336 (3 March 2014)

Doubles
- Career record: 359–203
- Career titles: 37 ITF
- Highest ranking: No. 219 (19 May 2014)
- Last updated on: 22 July 2026.

Melis Sezer (born 2 June 1993) is a Turkish former tennis player. On 3 March 2014, she reached her best singles ranking of world No. 336. On 19 May 2014, she peaked at No. 219 in the doubles rankings. Sezer has won nine singles and 37 doubles titles on the ITF Circuit.

Playing for the Turkey Fed Cup team, she has a win–loss record of 3–4. She has been a member of the Enkaspor tennis team.

Sezer made her WTA Tour main-draw debut at the 2015 İstanbul Cup, in the doubles event, partnering Ayla Aksu. In the quarterfinals, the pair was defeated by Serbian Jelena Janković and Turkish Çağla Büyükakçay in straight sets (3–6, 2–6).

== ITF Circuit finals ==
=== Singles: 20 (9 titles, 11 runner-ups) ===
Legend W10/15 tournaments	Finals by surface Hard (9–8) Clay (0–3)

Result	W–L	Date	Tournament	Tier	Surface	Opponent	Score
Win	1–0	May 2011	ITF Gaziantep, Turkey	W10	Hard	(Bulgaria) Hülya Esen	6–2, 6–1
Loss	1–1	Jun 2012	ITF Trabzon, Turkey	W10	Hard	(Russia) Margarita Lazareva	4–6, 3–6
Win	2–1	Jul 2012	ITF Istanbul, Turkey	W10	Hard	(Sweden) Sandra Roma	7–6, 6–4
Win	3–1	May 2013	ITF Sharm El Sheikh, Egypt	W10	Hard	(Turkey) Başak Eraydın	6–2, 4–6, 6–3
Loss	3–2	Jul 2013	ITF Izmir, Turkey	W10	Hard	(Slovakia) Zuzana Zlochová	3–6, 6–3, 0–6
Win	4–2	Jul 2013	ITF Istanbul, Turkey	W10	Hard	(Turkey) Başak Eraydın	6–2, 6–7, 6–2
Loss	4–3	Apr 2014	ITF Antalya, Turkey	W10	Hard	(Bulgaria) Julia Terziyska	6–7, 2–6
Loss	4–4	Jun 2014	ITF Tarsus, Turkey	W10	Clay	(Russia) Anastasia Pivovarova	1–6, 2–6
Loss	4–5	Jun 2014	ITF Istanbul, Turkey	W10	Hard	(Turkey) İpek Soylu	3–6, 4–6
Win	5–5	Jun 2014	ITF Konya, Turkey	W10	Hard	(Greece) Agni Stefanou	6–2, 6–3
Loss	5–6	Nov 2014	ITF Antalya, Turkey	W10	Clay	(Romania) Irina Bara	3–6, 2–6
Loss	5–7	May 2015	ITF Antalya, Turkey	W10	Hard	(Kyrgyzstan) Ksenia Palkina	6–4, 6–7^{(6)}, 2–6
Loss	5–8	Jun 2015	ITF Balıkesir, Turkey	W10	Clay	(Turkey) Başak Eraydın	3–6, 7–5, 3–6
Win	6–8	Aug 2015	ITF Istanbul, Turkey	W10	Hard	(Turkey) Ayla Aksu	7–5, 7–6^{(4)}
Loss	6–9	Aug 2015	ITF Balıkesir, Turkey	W10	Hard	(Germany) Julia Wachaczyk	4–6, 4–6
Loss	6–10	Aug 2015	ITF Antalya, Turkey	W10	Hard	(France) Lou Brouleau	6–0, 5–7, 4–6
Win	7–10	May 2016	ITF Baku, Azerbaijan	W10	Hard	(Belarus) Sadafmoh Tolibova	6–1, 2–6, 6–2
Win	8–10	Sep 2016	ITF Kiryat Gat, Israel	W10	Hard	(Belgium) Hélène Scholsen	6–2, 6–7^{(4)}, 6–3
Win	9–10	Oct 2016	ITF Tiberias, Israel	W10	Hard	(Israel) Vlada Ekshibarova	6–3, 6–3
Loss	9–11	May 2018	ITF Sajur, Israel	W15	Hard	(Romania) Ilona Georgiana Ghioroaie	2–6, 2–6

=== Doubles: 68 (37 titles, 31 runner-ups) ===
Legend W50 tournaments W25 tournaments W10/15 tournaments	Finals by surface Hard (21–15) Clay (15–16) Carpet (1–0)

Result	W–L	Date	Tournament	Tier	Surface	Partner	Opponents	Score
Loss	0–1	May 2011	ITF Gaziantep, Turkey	W10	Hard	(Australia) Daniella Jeflea	(Armenia) Ani Amiraghyan (Turkey) Başak Eraydın	2–6, 3–6
Loss	0–2	Jun 2011	ITF Istanbul, Turkey	W25	Hard	(Australia) Daniella Jeflea	(Poland) Marta Domachowska (Serbia) Teodora Mirčić	4–6, 2–6
Win	1–2	May 2012	ITF Istanbul, Turkey	W10	Hard	(Turkey) Başak Eraydın	(Oman) Fatma Al-Nabhani (Germany) Anna Zaja	6–2, 3–6, [10–7]
Loss	1–3	Jul 2012	ITF İzmir, Turkey	W10	Hard	(Australia) Abbie Myers	(Romania) Ana Bogdan (Serbia) Teodora Mirčić	3–6, 0–3 ret.
Win	2–3	Jul 2012	ITF Istanbul, Turkey	W10	Hard	(Turkey) Başak Eraydın	(Canada) Élisabeth Fournier (Canada) Brittany Wowchuk	6–1, 6–4
Win	3–3	Jan 2013	ITF Antalya, Turkey	W10	Clay	(Japan) Chiaki Okadaue	(Georgia (country)) Sofia Kvatsabaia (Ukraine) Marianna Zakarlyuk	6–3, 6–4
Loss	3–4	Jan 2013	ITF Sharm El Sheikh, Egypt	W10	Hard	(Austria) Melanie Klaffner	(Belarus) Lidziya Marozava (Russia) Eugeniya Pashkova	3–6, 1–6
Loss	3–5	May 2013	ITF Sharm El Sheikh, Egypt	W10	Hard	(Turkey) Başak Eraydın	(United Kingdom) Anna Fitzpatrick (Montenegro) Ana Veselinović	6–2, 4–6, [3–10]
Win	4–5	Jun 2013	ITF Ağrı, Turkey	W25	Carpet	(Bosnia and Herzegovina) Jasmina Tinjić	(Turkey) Çağla Büyükakçay (Turkey) Pemra Özgen	6–4, 3–6, [10–8]
Win	5–5	Jun 2013	ITF Istanbul, Turkey	W10	Hard	(Turkey) İpek Soylu	(Turkey) Başak Eraydın (Bosnia and Herzegovina) Jasmina Tinjić	6–4, ret.
Win	6–5	Jul 2013	ITF Istanbul, Turkey	W10	Hard	(Bulgaria) Dia Evtimova	(Ukraine) Khristina Kazimova (Ukraine) Vladyslava Zanosiyenko	7–5, 6–3
Loss	6–6	Oct 2013	ITF Herzliya, Israel	W25	Hard	(Turkey) Başak Eraydın	(Ukraine) Yuliya Beygelzimer (Ukraine) Anastasiya Vasylyeva	3–6, 3–6
Win	7–6	Jan 2014	ITF Sharm El Sheikh, Egypt	W10	Hard	(Turkey) İpek Soylu	(Greece) Despina Papamichail (Italy) Gaia Sanesi	4–6, 6–4, [10–3]
Loss	7–7	Jan 2014	ITF Sharm El Sheikh, Egypt	W10	Hard	(Turkey) İpek Soylu	(Ukraine) Valentyna Ivakhnenko (Ukraine) Veronika Kapshay	6–3, 4–6, [5–10]
Loss	7–8	Mar 2014	ITF Antalya, Turkey	W10	Hard	(Turkey) İpek Soylu	(Czech Republic) Denisa Allertová (Slovakia) Chantal Škamlová	2–6, 1–6
Loss	7–9	May 2014	ITF Incheon, South Korea	W25	Hard	(Thailand) Noppawan Lertcheewakarn	(South Korea) Han Na-lae (South Korea) Yoo Mi	1–6, 1–6
Loss	7–10	May 2014	ITF Tarsus, Turkey	W10	Clay	(Russia) Anastasia Pivovarova	(Bosnia and Herzegovina) Anita Husarić (Belgium) Kimberley Zimmermann	4–6, 2–6
Loss	7–11	Jun 2014	ITF Sarajevo, Bosnia and Herzegovina	W15	Clay	(Germany) Carolin Daniels	(Czech Republic) Barbora Krejčíková (Bulgaria) Viktoriya Tomova	6–7, 2–6
Win	8–11	Jun 2014	ITF Konya, Turkey	W10	Hard	(Russia) Margarita Lazareva	(France) Clémence Fayol (Turkey) Müge Topsel	6–3, 6–2
Win	9–11	Jul 2014	ITF Istanbul, Turkey	W10	Hard	(Turkey) Başak Eraydın	(Russia) Maria Mokh (Sweden) Anette Munozova	2–6, 6–0, [10–7]
Win	10–11	Oct 2014	ITF Sharm El Sheikh, Egypt	W10	Hard	(United Kingdom) Harriet Dart	(Romania) Ioana Ducu (United Kingdom) Eden Silva	7–5, 6–1
Win	11–11	Nov 2014	ITF Antalya, Turkey	W10	Clay	(Romania) Irina Bara	(Germany) Lisa Ponomar (Russia) Shakhlo Saidova	w/o
Loss	11–12	Nov 2014	ITF Antalya, Turkey	W10	Clay	(Romania) Irina Bara	(Italy) Valeria Prosperi (Uzbekistan) Arina Folts	6–3, 6–7^{(4)}, [5–10]
Win	12–12	Jan 2015	ITF Antalya, Turkey	W10	Clay	(South Africa) Chanel Simmonds	(Georgia (country)) Ekaterine Gorgodze (Georgia (country)) Sofia Kvatsabaia	6–4, 4–6, [10–4]
Win	13–12	Feb 2015	ITF Antalya, Turkey	W10	Clay	(Slovakia) Lenka Wienerová	(Russia) Polina Novoselova (Belarus) Iryna Shymanovich	6–2, 6–2
Win	14–12	Mar 2015	ITF Antalya, Turkey	W10	Hard	(Turkey) Ayla Aksu	(Belgium) Dorien Cuypers (Venezuela) Aymet Uzcátegui	6–2, 6–4
Win	15–12	May 2015	ITF Antalya, Turkey	W10	Hard	(Turkey) Ayla Aksu	(Venezuela) Mariaryeni Gutiérrez (Spain) María Martínez Martínez	7–5, 6–2
Win	16–12	Jun 2015	ITF Adana, Turkey	W10	Hard	(Turkey) Ayla Aksu	(Turkey) Cemre Anıl (Russia) Vasilisa Aponasenko	6–1, 6–3
Win	17–12	Jun 2015	ITF Adana, Turkey	W10	Hard	(Turkey) Ayla Aksu	(Norway) Emma Flood (Sweden) Anette Munozova	6–7^{(5)}, 6–4, [10–3]
Win	18–12	Jun 2015	ITF Tarsus, Turkey	W10	Hard	(North Macedonia) Lina Gjorcheska	(Germany) Nora Niedmers (Germany) Alina Wessel	6–3, 6–1
Win	19–12	Jun 2015	ITF Balıkesir, Turkey	W10	Hard	(Turkey) Ayla Aksu	(Romania) Cristina Adamescu (Turkey) Cemre Anıl	6–3, 6–2
Win	20–12	Sep 2015	Royal Cup, Montenegro	W25	Clay	(North Macedonia) Lina Gjorcheska	(Montenegro) Nikoleta Bulatović (Montenegro) Nina Kalezić	6–0, 6–0
Loss	20–13	Jan 2016	ITF Aurangabad, India	W25	Clay	(Russia) Ekaterina Yashina	(Russia) Margarita Lazareva (Ukraine) Valeriya Strakhova	1–6, 6–7^{(2)}
Win	21–13	Apr 2016	ITF Antalya, Turkey	W10	Hard	(Turkey) Ayla Aksu	(Bulgaria) Viktoriya Tomova (Ukraine) Anastasiya Vasylyeva	6–3, 6–3
Win	22–13	Apr 2016	ITF Manisa, Turkey	W10	Clay	(Australia) Abbie Myers	(Greece) Eleni Daniilidou (Russia) Margarita Lazareva	6–4, 6–4
Win	23–13	May 2016	ITF Baku, Azerbaijan	W10	Hard	(Belarus) Sadafmoh Tolibova	(Russia) Ralina Kalimullina (Russia) Anastasia Nefedova	6–0, 7–5
Win	24–13	Jul 2016	ITF Antalya, Turkey	W10	Hard	(Montenegro) Ana Veselinović	(Israel) Vlada Ekshibarova (Ukraine) Alyona Sotnikova	6–3, 6–4
Loss	24–14	Sep 2016	ITF Kiryat Gat, Israel	W10	Hard	(Israel) Vlada Ekshibarova	(Russia) Ekaterina Kazionova (United States) Madeleine Kobelt	6–7^{(5)}, 3–6
Win	25–14	Oct 2016	ITF Tiberias, Israel	W10	Hard	(Israel) Vlada Ekshibarova	(Russia) Ekaterina Kazionova (United States) Madeleine Kobelt	6–1, 6–3
Win	26–14	Nov 2016	ITF Antalya, Turkey	W10	Clay	(Turkey) Ayla Aksu	(Bulgaria) Dia Evtimova (Estonia) Valeria Gorlats	6–1, 7–6 ^{(5)}
Loss	26–15	Nov 2016	ITF Antalya, Turkey	W10	Clay	(Turkey) Berfu Cengiz	(Ukraine) Diana Khodan (Ukraine) Mariya Koryttseva	1–6, 4–6
Win	27–15	Nov 2016	ITF Antalya, Turkey	W10	Clay	(Bulgaria) Dia Evtimova	(Hungary) Ágnes Bukta (Slovakia) Vivien Juhászová	6–4, 6–3
Win	28–15	Jul 2017	ITF Istanbul, Turkey	W15	Clay	(United States) Sanaz Marand	(Croatia) Ena Kajević (Turkey) İpek Öz	6–2, 7–6^{(1)}
Loss	28–16	Aug 2017	ITF Istanbul, Turkey	W15	Clay	(Japan) Chihiro Muramatsu	(Bulgaria) Dia Evtimova (Bosnia and Herzegovina) Jasmina Tinjić	4–6, 2–6
Loss	28–17	Sep 2017	ITF Antalya, Turkey	W15	Clay	(Romania) Andreea Ghițescu	(Moldova) Adriana Sosnovschi (Moldova) Vitalia Stamat	3–6, 7–5, [8–10]
Loss	28–18	Sep 2017	ITF Antalya, Turkey	W15	Clay	(Russia) Amina Anshba	(Romania) Georgia Crăciun (Romania) Andreea Ghițescu	2–6, 2–6
Loss	28–19	Nov 2017	ITF Antalya, Turkey	W15	Clay	(Lithuania) Paulina Bakaitė	(Turkey) Cemre Anıl (Czech Republic) Gabriela Horáčková	6–3, 4–6, [8–10]
Win	29–19	Nov 2017	ITF Antalya, Turkey	W15	Clay	(Turkey) İpek Öz	(Russia) Polina Bakhmutkina (Czech Republic) Magdaléna Pantůčková	3–6, 7–5, [14–12]
Win	30–19	Dec 2017	ITF Antalya, Turkey	W15	Clay	(Japan) Chihiro Muramatsu	(Austria) Pia König (Russia) Alina Silich	6–1, 6–4
Loss	30–20	Mar 2018	ITF Antalya, Turkey	W15	Clay	(Russia) Amina Anshba	(United States) Catherine Harrison (United States) Sarah Lee	4–6, 3–6
Loss	30–21	Jun 2018	ITF Antalya, Turkey	W15	Clay	(Ukraine) Maryna Chernyshova	(Bulgaria) Dia Evtimova (Russia) Angelina Zhuravleva	5–7, 6–3, [12–14]
Win	31–21	Jun 2018	ITF Minsk, Belarus	W15	Clay	(Turkey) İpek Öz	(Belarus) Anna Kubareva (Czech Republic) Anna Sisková	6–1, 0–6, [10–8]
Win	32–21	Jun 2018	ITF Minsk, Belarus	W15	Clay	(Turkey) İpek Öz	(Belgium) Margaux Bovy (Russia) Angelina Zhuravleva	6–2, 4–6, [10–5]
Loss	32–22	Jul 2018	Telavi Open, Georgia	W15	Clay	(Turkey) İpek Öz	(Russia) Nadezda Gorbachkova (Moldova) Iulia Helbet	0–1 ret.
Loss	32–23	Sep 2018	ITF Varna, Bulgaria	W15	Clay	(Turkey) İpek Öz	(Romania) Gabriela Talabă (Venezuela) Aymet Uzcátegui	6–3, 5–7, [5–10]
Win	33–23	Sep 2018	ITF Antalya, Turkey	W15	Hard	(Turkey) Cemre Anıl	(Latvia) Alise Čerņecka (Finland) Oona Orpana	6–2, 7–5
Loss	33–24	Oct 2018	ITF Antalya, Turkey	W15	Hard	(Turkey) Cemre Anıl	(Romania) Georgia Crăciun (Russia) Alena Fomina	5–7, 6–7^{(4)}
Loss	33–25	Nov 2018	ITF Antalya, Turkey	W15	Hard	(Turkey) İpek Öz	(Romania) Ioana Gașpar (Romania) Gabriela Tătăruș	7–6^{(3)}, 5–7, [4–10]
Win	34–25	May 2019	ITF Tbilisi, Georgia	W15	Hard	(Belgium) Eliessa Vanlangendonck	(Canada) Noëlly Longi Nsimba (Russia) Alina Silich	w/o
Win	35–25	Jun 2019	ITF Budapest, Hungary	W15	Clay	(Turkey) İpek Öz	(Czech Republic) Kristýna Hrabalová (Slovakia) Laura Svatíková	6–3, 4–6, [15–13]
Win	36–25	Jul 2019	ITF Prokuplje, Serbia	W15	Clay	(Turkey) İpek Öz	(Bosnia and Herzegovina) Nefisa Berberović (Slovenia) Veronika Erjavec	7–5, 7–5
Win	37–25	Sep 2019	Batumi Ladies Open, Georgia	W15	Hard	(Sweden) Jacqueline Cabaj Awad	(Poland) Weronika Falkowska (Poland) Paulina Jastrzębska	7–6^{(3)}, 6–3
Loss	37–26	Dec 2019	ITF Antalya, Turkey	W15	Hard	(Switzerland) Leonie Küng	(Romania) Georgia Crăciun (Romania) Ioana Gașpar	4–6, 6–1, [12–14]
Loss	37–27	Mar 2020	ITF Antalya, Turkey	W25	Clay	(Turkey) İpek Öz	(Hungary) Réka Luca Jani (Egypt) Mayar Sherif	7–6^{(8)}, 1–6, [3–10]
Loss	37–28	Oct 2020	ITF Istanbul, Turkey	W25	Clay	(United Kingdom) Maia Lumsden	(Romania) Jaqueline Cristian (Romania) Elena-Gabriela Ruse	3–6, 4–6
Loss	37–29	Sep 2022	ITF Varna, Bulgaria	W15	Clay	(Bulgaria) Julia Stamatova	(Romania) Patricia Maria Țig (Romania) Maria Toma	4–6, 4–6
Loss	37–30	Oct 2024	ITF Kayseri, Turkey	W50	Hard	(Bulgaria) Isabella Shinikova	(Romania) Briana Szabó (Romania) Patricia Maria Țig	6–3, 4–6, [8–10]
Loss	37–31	Mar 2025	ITF Antalya, Turkey	W15	Clay	(Turkey) Selina Atay	(Germany) Annemarie Lazar (China) Xu Shilin	6–7^{(2)}, 5–7

== See also ==
- Turkish women in sports
