= 2017 Bursa Cup =

- Date: 17–23 July
- Edition: 3rd
- Category: ITF Women's Circuit
- Prize money: $60,000
- Surface: Clay
- Location: Bursa, Turkey

Champions

Singles
- (Russia) Sofya Zhuk

Doubles
- (Russia) Valentyna Ivakhnenko / (Ukraine) Anastasiya Vasylyeva
← 2016 ·	Bursa Cup	· 2018 →

The 2017 Bursa Cup was a professional tennis tournament played on outdoor clay courts. It was the third edition of the tournament and was part of the 2017 ITF Women's Circuit. It took place in Bursa, Turkey, on 17–23 July 2017.

== Singles main draw entrants ==
=== Seeds ===
Country	Player	Rank^{1}	Seed
TUR	İpek Soylu	177	1
RUS	Sofya Zhuk	208	2
SRB	Dejana Radanović	264	3
FRA	Alizé Lim	266	4
IND	Ankita Raina	274	5
UKR	Dayana Yastremska	292	6
RUS	Valentyna Ivakhnenko	295	7
TUR	Ayla Aksu	301	8

- ^{1} Rankings as of 3 July 2017.

=== Other entrants ===
The following players received a wildcard into the singles main draw:

- (Turkey) Muazzez Demirci
- (Turkey) İpek Öz
- (Turkey) Zeynep Sena Sarıoğlan
- (Turkey) Betina Tokaç

The following player received entry by a protected ranking:

- (Italy) Anastasia Grymalska

The following players received entry from the qualifying draw:

- (France) Estelle Cascino
- (Bulgaria) Dia Evtimova
- (Romania) Daiana Negreanu
- (India) Kyra Shroff

== Champions ==
=== Singles ===
- (Russia) Sofya Zhuk def. (Turkey) İpek Soylu, 4–6, 6–3, 7–6^{(7–5)}

=== Doubles ===
- (Russia) Valentyna Ivakhnenko / (Ukraine) Anastasiya Vasylyeva def. (Bosnia and Herzegovina) Dea Herdželaš / (Russia) Aleksandra Pospelova, 6–3, 5–7, [10–1]
