= 2015 Bursa Cup =

- Date: 6–12 July
- Edition: 1st
- Category: ITF Women's Circuit
- Prize money: $50,000
- Surface: Clay
- Location: Bursa, Turkey

Champions

Singles
- (Turkey) İpek Soylu

Doubles
- (Russia) Marina Melnikova / (Spain) Laura Pous Tió
Bursa Cup	· 2016 →

The 2015 Bursa Cup was a professional tennis tournament played on outdoor clay courts. It was the first edition of the tournament and part of the 2015 ITF Women's Circuit, offering a total of $50,000 in prize money. It took place in Bursa, Turkey, on 6–12 June 2015.

== Singles main draw entrants ==
=== Seeds ===
Country	Player	Rank^{1}	Seed
RUS	Elizaveta Kulichkova	109	1
TUR	Çağla Büyükakçay	140	2
CZE	Barbora Krejčíková	141	3
UKR	Yuliya Beygelzimer	172	4
RUS	Marina Melnikova	174	5
ESP	Laura Pous Tió	193	6
CHN	Zhang Shuai	194	7
GRE	Maria Sakkari	210	8

- ^{1} Rankings as of 29 June 2015

=== Other entrants ===
The following players received wildcards into the singles main draw:

- (Turkey) Ayla Aksu
- (Turkey) Başak Eraydın
- (Turkey) Deniz Paykoç
- (Turkey) Melis Sezer

The following players received entry from the qualifying draw:

- (North Macedonia) Lina Gjorcheska
- (Ukraine) Ganna Poznikhirenko
- (France) Caroline Roméo
- (Romania) Raluca Georgiana Șerban

The following player received entry by a protected ranking:

- (Romania) Mihaela Buzărnescu

== Champions ==
=== Singles ===
- (Turkey) İpek Soylu def. (Latvia) Anastasija Sevastova, 7–5, 3–6, 6–1

=== Doubles ===
- (Russia) Marina Melnikova / (Spain) Laura Pous Tió def. (Georgia (country)) Sofia Shapatava / (Ukraine) Anastasiya Vasylyeva, 6–4, 6–4
