= 2017 Bursa Cup – Singles =

Singles
- 2017 Bursa Cup

Final
- Champion: (Russia) Sofya Zhuk
- Runner-up: (Turkey) İpek Soylu
- Score: 4–6, 6–3, 7–6^{(7–5)}

Events
Singles	Doubles
← 2016 ·	Bursa Cup	· 2018 →

There was no defending champion as the 2016 edition was abandoned due to the 2016 Turkish coup d'état attempt.

Sofya Zhuk won the title, defeating İpek Soylu in the final, 4–6, 6–3, 7–6^{(7–5)}.

== Seeds ==
1. (Turkey) İpek Soylu (final)
2. (Russia) Sofya Zhuk (champion)
3. (Serbia) Dejana Radanović (quarterfinals)
4. (France) Alizé Lim (second round)
5. (India) Ankita Raina (semifinals)
6. (Ukraine) Dayana Yastremska (quarterfinals)
7. (Russia) Valentyna Ivakhnenko (semifinals)
8. (Turkey) Ayla Aksu (quarterfinals)

== Draw ==
=== Key ===
- Q = Qualifier
- WC = Wild card
- LL = Lucky loser
- Alt = Alternate
- SE = Special exempt
- PR = Protected ranking
- ITF = ITF entry
- JE = Junior exempt
- w/o = Walkover
- r = Retired
- d = Defaulted
- SR = Special ranking

=== Finals ===
Semifinals
1	(Turkey) İpek Soylu	6	4	6
5	(India) Ankita Raina	4	6	2
7	(Russia) Valentyna Ivakhnenko	4	2
2	(Russia) Sofya Zhuk	6	6

Final
1	(Turkey) İpek Soylu	6	3	6^{5}
2	(Russia) Sofya Zhuk	4	6	7^{7}

=== Top half ===
First round
1	(Turkey) İ Soylu	7^{9}	6
(Ukraine) A Vasylyeva	6^{7}	3
Q	(France) E Cascino	6	6^{5}	3
(Romania) OG Simion	4	7^{7}	6
WC	(Turkey) M Demirci	0	1
(Ukraine) V Strakhova	6	6
(Slovakia) V Juhászová	0	2
8	(Turkey) A Aksu	6	6
3	(Serbia) D Radanović	6	6
WC	(Turkey) B Tokaç	2	2
WC	(Turkey) ZS Sarıoğlan	1	1
(Bosnia and Herzegovina) D Herdželaš	6	6
(Russia) A Gasanova	7^{7}	6
Q	(Romania) D Negreanu	6^{5}	1
(Hungary) V Lukács	2^{r}
5	(India) A Raina	1

Second round
1	(Turkey) İ Soylu	5	6	6
(Romania) OG Simion	7	1	2
(Ukraine) V Strakhova	6	6^{4}	4
8	(Turkey) A Aksu	2	7^{7}	6
3	(Serbia) D Radanović	6	6
(Bosnia and Herzegovina) D Herdželaš	4	2
(Russia) A Gasanova	6	3	4
5	(India) A Raina	4	6	6

Quarterfinals
1	(Turkey) İ Soylu	4	7^{7}	6
8	(Turkey) A Aksu	6	6^{4}	0
3	(Serbia) D Radanović	6	5	1
5	(India) A Raina	1	7	6

Semifinals
1	(Turkey) İ Soylu	6	4	6
5	(India) A Raina	4	6	2

=== Bottom half ===
First round
7	(Russia) V Ivakhnenko	6	6
(Turkey) B Cengiz	4	1
PR	(Italy) A Grymalska	6^{1}	6	6
(Russia) A Panova	7^{7}	4	4
(Ukraine) G Poznikhirenko	6	6
(Turkey) P Özgen	4	3
(Italy) M Caregaro	6	4	6^{3}
4	(France) A Lim	3	6	7^{7}
6	(Ukraine) D Yastremska	6	6
Q	(Bulgaria) D Evtimova	3	0
WC	(Turkey) İ Öz	2	1
(Georgia (country)) E Gorgodze	6	6
(Croatia) A Vrljić	6	6
Q	(India) K Shroff	2	2
(Slovakia) C Škamlová	3	3
2	(Russia) S Zhuk	6	6

Second round
7	(Russia) V Ivakhnenko	6	6
PR	(Italy) A Grymalska	4	1
(Ukraine) G Poznikhirenko	6	7
4	(France) A Lim	2	5
6	(Ukraine) D Yastremska	3	6	6
(Georgia (country)) E Gorgodze	6	4	2
(Croatia) A Vrljić	3	1
2	(Russia) S Zhuk	6	6

Quarterfinals
7	(Russia) V Ivakhnenko	6	6
(Ukraine) G Poznikhirenko	1	0
6	(Ukraine) D Yastremska	1	6	2
2	(Russia) S Zhuk	6	4	6

Semifinals
7	(Russia) V Ivakhnenko	4	2
2	(Russia) S Zhuk	6	6
