= 2015 Bursa Cup – Doubles =

Doubles
- 2015 Bursa Cup

Final
- Champions: (Russia) Marina Melnikova (Spain) Laura Pous Tió
- Runners-up: (Georgia (country)) Sofia Shapatava (Ukraine) Anastasiya Vasylyeva
- Score: 6–4, 6–4

Events
Singles	Doubles
← 2014 ·	Bursa Cup	· 2016 →

This was a new event to the ITF Women's Circuit.

Marina Melnikova and Laura Pous Tió won the inaugural event, defeating Sofia Shapatava and Anastasiya Vasylyeva in the final, 6–4, 6–4.

== Seeds ==
1. (Ukraine) Yuliya Beygelzimer / (Czech Republic) Barbora Krejčíková (quarterfinals)
2. (Turkey) İpek Soylu / (Croatia) Ana Vrljić (quarterfinals)
3. (Georgia (country)) Sofia Shapatava / (Ukraine) Anastasiya Vasylyeva (final)
4. (Turkey) Çağla Büyükakçay / (Turkey) Pemra Özgen (quarterfinals)

== Draw ==
=== Key ===
- Q = Qualifier
- WC = Wild card
- LL = Lucky loser
- Alt = Alternate
- SE = Special exempt
- PR = Protected ranking
- ITF = ITF entry
- JE = Junior exempt
- w/o = Walkover
- r = Retired
- d = Defaulted
- SR = Special ranking

First round
1	(Ukraine) Y Beygelzimer (Czech Republic) B Krejčíková	6	6
(Sweden) A Munozova (Turkey) M Topsel	2	0
(Russia) M Melnikova (Spain) L Pous Tió	6	6
(Slovenia) T Majerič (Russia) A Morgina	1	3
4	(Turkey) Ç Büyükakçay (Turkey) P Özgen	6	6
(Belarus) S Pirazhenka (Ukraine) G Poznikhirenko	3	2
(Turkey) B Eraydın (Russia) A Gabueva	2	6	[5]
(North Macedonia) L Gjorcheska (Turkey) M Sezer	6	4	[10]
(India) A Raina (Russia) E Yashina	0	2
(Romania) IM Bara (Romania) M Buzărnescu	6	6
WC	(Turkey) D Paykoç (Turkey) D Yurtkuran	1	0
3	(Georgia (country)) S Shapatava (Ukraine) A Vasylyeva	6	6
(Bosnia and Herzegovina) D Herdželaš (Croatia) A Lekaj	6	6
WC	(Romania) C Adamescu (Turkey) C Anıl	4	1
WC	(Turkey) S Heper (Turkey) İT Köken	0	0
2	(Turkey) İ Soylu (Croatia) A Vrljić	6	6

Quarterfinals
1	(Ukraine) Y Beygelzimer (Czech Republic) B Krejčíková	6	4	[5]
(Russia) M Melnikova (Spain) L Pous Tió	3	6	[10]
4	(Turkey) Ç Büyükakçay (Turkey) P Özgen	7^{7}	5	[6]
(North Macedonia) L Gjorcheska (Turkey) M Sezer	6^{3}	7	[10]
(Romania) IM Bara (Romania) M Buzărnescu	6^{3}	6	[8]
3	(Georgia (country)) S Shapatava (Ukraine) A Vasylyeva	7^{7}	0	[10]
(Bosnia and Herzegovina) D Herdželaš (Croatia) A Lekaj	3	6	[10]
2	(Turkey) İ Soylu (Croatia) A Vrljić	6	4	[8]

Semifinals
(Russia) M Melnikova (Spain) L Pous Tió	3	7	[10]
(North Macedonia) L Gjorcheska (Turkey) M Sezer	6	5	[6]
3	(Georgia (country)) S Shapatava (Ukraine) A Vasylyeva	6	5	[10]
(Bosnia and Herzegovina) D Herdželaš (Croatia) A Lekaj	2	7	[4]

Final
(Russia) M Melnikova (Spain) L Pous Tió	6	6
3	(Georgia (country)) S Shapatava (Ukraine) A Vasylyeva	4	4
