= 2017 Bursa Cup – Doubles =

Doubles
- 2017 Bursa Cup

Final
- Champion: (Russia) Valentyna Ivakhnenko (Ukraine) Anastasiya Vasylyeva
- Runner-up: (Bosnia and Herzegovina) Dea Herdželaš (Russia) Aleksandra Pospelova
- Score: 6–3, 5–7, [10–1]

Events
| Singles | Doubles |
| ← 2016 · | Bursa Cup | · 2018 → |

There was no defending champion as the 2016 edition was abandoned due to the 2016 Turkish coup d'état attempt.

Valentyna Ivakhnenko and Anastasiya Vasylyeva won the title, defeating Dea Herdželaš and Aleksandra Pospelova in the final, 6–3, 5–7, [10–1].

== Seeds ==
1. (Russia) Alexandra Panova / (Turkey) İpek Soylu (quarterfinals; withdrew)
2. (Slovakia) Chantal Škamlová / (Ukraine) Valeriya Strakhova (semifinals)
3. (Slovakia) Vivien Juhászová / (Ukraine) Dayana Yastremska (semifinals)
4. (Ukraine) Ganna Poznikhirenko / (India) Ankita Raina (first round)

== Draw ==
=== Key ===
- Q = Qualifier
- WC = Wild card
- LL = Lucky loser
- Alt = Alternate
- SE = Special exempt
- PR = Protected ranking
- ITF = ITF entry
- JE = Junior exempt
- w/o = Walkover
- r = Retired
- d = Defaulted
- SR = Special ranking

First round
1 | (Russia) A Panova (Turkey) İ Soylu | 7^{7} | 6
WC | (Bulgaria) P Arshinkova (Turkey) İ Öz | 6^{3} | 2
(France) E Cascino (Hungary) V Lukács
(Bosnia and Herzegovina) D Herdželaš (Russia) A Pospelova | w/o
3 | (Slovakia) V Juhászová (Ukraine) D Yastremska | 6 | 6
WC | (Turkey) ZS Sarıoğlan (Turkey) B Tokaç | 0 | 1
(Turkey) A Aksu (Turkey) M Sezer | 6 | 6^{5} | [3]
(Serbia) B Bonić (Bulgaria) D Evtimova | 4 | 7^{7} | [10]
(Romania) D Negreanu (India) K Shroff | 6 | 6
WC | (Turkey) C Anıl (Bulgaria) J Stamatova | 1 | 1
(Russia) V Ivakhnenko (Ukraine) A Vasylyeva | 7^{7} | 6
4 | (Ukraine) G Poznikhirenko (India) A Raina | 6^{2} | 0
(Italy) M Caregaro (Italy) A Grymalska | 3 | 3
(Romania) A Ghițescu (Romania) OG Simion | 6 | 6
(Turkey) B Cengiz (Sweden) F Östlund | 0 | 6 | [8]
2 | (Slovakia) C Škamlová (Ukraine) V Strakhova | 6 | 3 | [10]

Quarterfinals
1 | (Russia) A Panova (Turkey) İ Soylu
(Bosnia and Herzegovina) D Herdželaš (Russia) A Pospelova | w/o
3 | (Slovakia) V Juhászová (Ukraine) D Yastremska | 6 | 7
(Serbia) B Bonić (Bulgaria) D Evtimova | 2 | 5
(Romania) D Negreanu (India) K Shroff | 3 | 2
(Russia) V Ivakhnenko (Ukraine) A Vasylyeva | 6 | 6
(Romania) A Ghițescu (Romania) OG Simion | 3 | 7 | [6]
2 | (Slovakia) C Škamlová (Ukraine) V Strakhova | 6 | 5 | [10]

Semifinals
(Bosnia and Herzegovina) D Herdželaš (Russia) A Pospelova | 6 | 2 | [10]
3 | (Slovakia) V Juhászová (Ukraine) D Yastremska | 3 | 6 | [4]
(Russia) V Ivakhnenko (Ukraine) A Vasylyeva | 7^{7} | 3 | [10]
2 | (Slovakia) C Škamlová (Ukraine) V Strakhova | 6^{4} | 6 | [8]

Final
(Bosnia and Herzegovina) D Herdželaš (Russia) A Pospelova | 3 | 7 | [1]
(Russia) V Ivakhnenko (Ukraine) A Vasylyeva | 6 | 5 | [10]
