= 2016 Bursa Cup – Singles =

Singles
- 2016 Bursa Cup
- Score: Tournament unfinished due to the 2016 Turkish coup d'état attempt

Events
Singles	Doubles
← 2015 ·	Bursa Cup	· 2017 →

İpek Soylu was the defending champion, however due to the violent situation in Turkey caused by the 2016 Turkish coup d'état attempt, the tournament was abandoned in the semifinal stage.

Soylu, Lina Gjorcheska, Sofia Shapatava and Nina Stojanović were the four remaining semifinalists who were unable to continue the tournament.

== Seeds ==
1. (Turkey) İpek Soylu (semifinals, not played)
2. (Serbia) Nina Stojanović (semifinals, not played)
3. (Georgia (country)) Sofia Shapatava (semifinals, not played)
4. (Ukraine) Valeriya Strakhova (second round)
5. (Slovenia) Tadeja Majerič (second round)
6. (Russia) Natela Dzalamidze (first round)
7. (Croatia) Ana Vrljić (first round)
8. (North Macedonia) Lina Gjorcheska (semifinals, not played)

== Main draw ==
=== Key ===
- Q = Qualifier
- WC = Wild card
- LL = Lucky loser
- Alt = Alternate
- SE = Special exempt
- PR = Protected ranking
- ITF = ITF entry
- JE = Junior exempt
- w/o = Walkover
- r = Retired
- d = Defaulted
- SR = Special ranking

=== Finals ===
Semifinals
1	(Turkey) İpek Soylu
8	(North Macedonia) Lina Gjorcheska	np
3	(Georgia (country)) Sofia Shapatava
2	(Serbia) Nina Stojanović	np

Final
np

=== Top half ===
First round
1	(Turkey) İ Soylu	6	6
Q	(Romania) C Adamescu	1	1
(Georgia (country)) S Kvatsabaia	4	1
(Slovenia) N Kolar	6	6
(Turkey) P Özgen	6^{7}	1
(Israel) D Khazaniuk	7^{9}	6
Q	(Romania) OG Simion	2	1
5	(Slovenia) T Majerič	6	6
4	(Ukraine) V Strakhova	6	6
WC	(Turkey) İ Öğüt	1	2
(Georgia (country)) E Gorgodze	6	6
(Russia) M Lazareva	2	1
(Ukraine) D Yastremska	5	3
(Russia) A Komardina	7	6
WC	(Turkey) S Övünç	2	2
8	(North Macedonia) L Gjorcheska	6	6

Second round
1	(Turkey) İ Soylu	6	6
(Slovenia) N Kolar	1	1
(Israel) D Khazaniuk	7	7^{7}
5	(Slovenia) T Majerič	5	6^{5}
4	(Ukraine) V Strakhova	4	3
(Georgia (country)) E Gorgodze	6	6
(Russia) A Komardina	6	1	2
8	(North Macedonia) L Gjorcheska	3	6	6

Quarterfinals
1	(Turkey) İ Soylu	6	6
(Israel) D Khazaniuk	1	0
(Georgia (country)) E Gorgodze	6	4	2
8	(North Macedonia) L Gjorcheska	4	6	6

Semifinals
1	(Turkey) İ Soylu
8	(North Macedonia) L Gjorcheska	np

=== Bottom half ===
First round
6	(Russia) N Dzalamidze	6^{3}	3
(Bosnia and Herzegovina) D Herdželaš	7^{7}	6
WC	(Turkey) B Cengiz	7^{7}	6
(Turkey) M Sezer	6^{4}	3
(Uzbekistan) A Amanmuradova	6	6
Q	(Serbia) M Spremo	4	2
(Bulgaria) D Evtimova	3	2
3	(Georgia (country)) S Shapatava	6	6
7	(Croatia) A Vrljić	2	4
(Russia) A Gasanova	6	6
WC	(Switzerland) C Grimm	6	2	6
(Turkey) A Aksu	4	6	4
(Bulgaria) J Stamatova	7	3	7
(Russia) Y Sizikova	5	6	5
Q	(Ukraine) G Poznikhirenko	0	6	1
2	(Serbia) N Stojanović	6	3	6

Second round
(Bosnia and Herzegovina) D Herdželaš	6	0
WC	(Turkey) B Cengiz	0	0^{r}
(Uzbekistan) A Amanmuradova	3	6^{8}
3	(Georgia (country)) S Shapatava	6	7^{10}
(Russia) A Gasanova	6	0
WC	(Switzerland) C Grimm	0	0^{r}
(Bulgaria) J Stamatova	1	5
2	(Serbia) N Stojanović	6	7

Quarterfinals
(Bosnia and Herzegovina) D Herdželaš	1	5
3	(Georgia (country)) S Shapatava	6	7
(Russia) A Gasanova	3	3
2	(Serbia) N Stojanović	6	6

Semifinals
3	(Georgia (country)) S Shapatava
2	(Serbia) N Stojanović	np
