= 2016 Bursa Cup – Doubles =

Doubles
- 2016 Bursa Cup
- Score: Tournament unfinished due to the 2016 Turkish coup d'état attempt

Events
Singles	Doubles
← 2015 ·	Bursa Cup	· 2017 →

Marina Melnikova and Laura Pous Tió were the defending champions, but chose not to participate.

Due to the violent situations in Turkey caused by the 2016 Turkish coup d'état attempt, the tournament was abandoned without finishing the final. Ekaterine Gorgodze, Sofia Shapatava, Akgul Amanmuradova and Natela Dzalamidze were the four players left in the final.

== Seeds ==
1. (Georgia (country)) Ekaterine Gorgodze / (Georgia (country)) Sofia Shapatava (final, not played)
2. (North Macedonia) Lina Gjorcheska / (Ukraine) Valeriya Strakhova (semifinals)
3. (Russia) Anastasiya Komardina / (Serbia) Nina Stojanović (semifinals)
4. (Russia) Polina Monova / (Russia) Yana Sizikova (quarterfinals)

== Draw ==
=== Key ===
- Q = Qualifier
- WC = Wild card
- LL = Lucky loser
- Alt = Alternate
- ITF = ITF entry
- PR = Protected ranking
- SR = Special ranking
- SE = Special exempt
- JE = Junior exempt
- JR = Junior Accelerator Programme entrant
- CO = College Accelerator Programme entrant
- NG = Next Gen Accelerator Program entrant
- w/o = Walkover
- r = Retired
- d = Defaulted

First round
1	(Georgia (country)) E Gorgodze (Georgia (country)) S Shapatava	6	3	[10]
(Turkey) P Özgen (Croatia) A Vrljić	2	6	[6]
WC	(Turkey) B Cengiz (Russia) A Gasanova	0	7	[10]
(Romania) OG Simion (United Kingdom) F Stephenson	6	5	[4]
3	(Russia) A Komardina (Serbia) N Stojanović	4	7	[10]
(Bulgaria) D Evtimova (Israel) D Khazaniuk	6	5	[2]
(Turkey) A Aksu (Turkey) M Sezer	6	6
WC	(Turkey) İp Soylu (Turkey) İr Soylu	3	1
(Uzbekistan) A Amanmuradova (Russia) N Dzalamidze	6	6
WC	(Turkey) C Anıl (Turkey) İ Öğüt	4	2
(Serbia) M Spremo (Bulgaria) J Stamatova	2	4
4	(Russia) P Monova (Russia) Y Sizikova	6	6
(Georgia (country)) S Kvatsabaia (Russia) M Lazareva	1	5
(Bosnia and Herzegovina) D Herdželaš (Ukraine) G Poznikhirenko	6	7
(Slovenia) N Kolar (Slovenia) T Majerič	2	6	[10]
2	(North Macedonia) L Gjorcheska (Ukraine) V Strakhova	6	3	[12]

Quarterfinals
1	(Georgia (country)) E Gorgodze (Georgia (country)) S Shapatava	w/o
WC	(Turkey) B Cengiz (Russia) A Gasanova
3	(Russia) A Komardina (Serbia) N Stojanović	6	6
(Turkey) A Aksu (Turkey) M Sezer	1	4
(Uzbekistan) A Amanmuradova (Russia) N Dzalamidze	7	5	[10]
4	(Russia) P Monova (Russia) Y Sizikova	5	7	[7]
(Bosnia and Herzegovina) D Herdželaš (Ukraine) G Poznikhirenko	3	2
2	(North Macedonia) L Gjorcheska (Ukraine) V Strakhova	6	6

Semifinals
1	(Georgia (country)) E Gorgodze (Georgia (country)) S Shapatava	4	6	[11]
3	(Russia) A Komardina (Serbia) N Stojanović	6	2	[9]
(Uzbekistan) A Amanmuradova (Russia) N Dzalamidze	6	6
2	(North Macedonia) L Gjorcheska (Ukraine) V Strakhova	3	1

Final
1	(Georgia (country)) E Gorgodze (Georgia (country)) S Shapatava
(Uzbekistan) A Amanmuradova (Russia) N Dzalamidze	np
