= 2015 Bursa Cup – Singles =

Singles
- 2015 Bursa Cup

Final
- Champion: (Turkey) İpek Soylu
- Runner-up: (Latvia) Anastasija Sevastova
- Score: 7–5, 3–6, 6–1

Events
Singles	Doubles
← 2014 ·	Bursa Cup	· 2016 →

This was a new event to the ITF Women's Circuit.

İpek Soylu won the title, defeating Anastasija Sevastova in the final, 7–5, 3–6, 6–1.

== Seeds ==
1. (Russia) Elizaveta Kulichkova (semifinals)
2. (Turkey) Çağla Büyükakçay (first round)
3. (Czech Republic) Barbora Krejčíková (quarterfinals)
4. (Ukraine) Yuliya Beygelzimer (first round)
5. (Russia) Marina Melnikova (second round)
6. (Spain) Laura Pous Tió (quarterfinals)
7. (China) Zhang Shuai (quarterfinals)
8. (Greece) Maria Sakkari (first round)

== Main draw ==
=== Key ===
- Q = Qualifier
- WC = Wild card
- LL = Lucky loser
- Alt = Alternate
- SE = Special exempt
- PR = Protected ranking
- ITF = ITF entry
- JE = Junior exempt
- w/o = Walkover
- r = Retired
- d = Defaulted
- SR = Special ranking

=== Finals ===
Semifinals
1	(Russia) Elizaveta Kulichkova	6^{3}	6	1
(Turkey) İpek Soylu	7^{7}	3	6
(Georgia (country)) Sofia Shapatava	2	0
(Latvia) Anastasija Sevastova	6	6

Final
(Turkey) İpek Soylu	7	3	6
(Latvia) Anastasija Sevastova	5	6	1

=== Top half ===
First round
1	(Russia) E Kulichkova	6	6
WC	(Turkey) B Eraydın	2	3
WC	(Turkey) D Paykoç	0	2
Q	(France) C Roméo	6	6
(Croatia) A Vrljić	6	2	6
Q	(Romania) RG Șerban	2	6	3
Q	(North Macedonia) L Gjorcheska	2	0
6	(Spain) L Pous Tió	6	6
4	(Ukraine) Y Beygelzimer	4	6	5
(Uzbekistan) A Amanmuradova	6	3	7
(Croatia) J Fett	4	6	6
(Slovenia) T Majerič	6	2	2
(Romania) C Dinu	6	6
WC	(Turkey) M Sezer	4	2
(Turkey) İ Soylu	6	6
8	(Greece) M Sakkari	3	3

Second round
1	(Russia) E Kulichkova	6	6
Q	(France) C Roméo	3	3
(Croatia) A Vrljić	2	3
6	(Spain) L Pous Tió	6	6
(Uzbekistan) A Amanmuradova	1	3
(Croatia) J Fett	6	6
(Romania) C Dinu	4	6	2
(Turkey) İ Soylu	6	2	6

Quarterfinals
1	(Russia) E Kulichkova	6	6
6	(Spain) L Pous Tió	1	1
(Croatia) J Fett	6	2	1
(Turkey) İ Soylu	3	6	6

Semifinals
1	(Russia) E Kulichkova	6^{3}	6	1
(Turkey) İ Soylu	7^{7}	3	6

=== Bottom half ===
First round
5	(Russia) M Melnikova	6	6
(Romania) IM Bara	4	1
(Georgia (country)) S Shapatava	6	6
WC	(Turkey) A Aksu	1	3
(Croatia) A Lekaj	1	2
PR	(Romania) M Buzărnescu	6	6
(India) A Raina	3	2
3	(Czech Republic) B Krejčíková	6	6
7	(China) S Zhang	6	7^{7}
(Russia) A Morgina	1	6^{3}
Q	(Ukraine) G Poznikhirenko	6	6
(Turkey) P Özgen	3	1
(Ukraine) A Vasylyeva	2	3
(Latvia) A Sevastova	6	6
(Russia) A Pivovarova	2	6	6
2	(Turkey) Ç Büyükakçay	6	4	2

Second round
5	(Russia) M Melnikova	6	4	4
(Georgia (country)) S Shapatava	2	6	6
PR	(Romania) M Buzărnescu	2	2
3	(Czech Republic) B Krejčíková	6	6
7	(China) S Zhang	2
Q	(Ukraine) G Poznikhirenko	0^{r}
(Latvia) A Sevastova	6	4	6
(Russia) A Pivovarova	3	6	2

Quarterfinals
(Georgia (country)) S Shapatava	6	7
3	(Czech Republic) B Krejčíková	4	5
7	(China) S Zhang	1	1
(Latvia) A Sevastova	6	6

Semifinals
(Georgia (country)) S Shapatava	2	0
(Latvia) A Sevastova	6	6
