= 2016 Bursa Cup =

- Date: 11–17 July
- Edition: 2nd
- Category: ITF Women's Circuit
- Prize money: $50,000
- Surface: Clay
- Location: Bursa, Turkey

Champions

Singles
- Tournament unfinished due to the 2016 Turkish coup d'état attempt

Doubles
- Tournament unfinished due to the 2016 Turkish coup d'état attempt
← 2015 ·	Bursa Cup	· 2017 →

The 2016 Bursa Cup was a professional tennis tournament played on outdoor clay courts. It was the second edition of the tournament and part of the 2016 ITF Women's Circuit, offering a total of $50,000 in prize money. It took place in Bursa, Turkey, on 11–17 July 2016. However, due to the 2016 Turkish coup d'état attempt on July 15, the tournament was left abandoned without full completion of both singles and doubles events.

== Singles main draw entrants ==
=== Seeds ===
Country	Player	Rank^{1}	Seed
TUR	İpek Soylu	161	1
SRB	Nina Stojanović	228	2
GEO	Sofia Shapatava	232	3
UKR	Valeriya Strakhova	249	4
SLO	Tadeja Majerič	262	5
RUS	Natela Dzalamidze	263	6
CRO	Ana Vrljić	282	7
MKD	Lina Gjorcheska	286	8

- ^{1} Rankings as of 27 June 2016.

=== Other entrants ===
The following player received a wildcard into the singles main draw:

- (Turkey) Berfu Cengiz
- (Switzerland) Chiara Grimm
- (Turkey) İnci Öğüt
- (Turkey) Selin Övünç

The following players received entry from the qualifying draw:

- (Romania) Cristina Adamescu
- (Ukraine) Ganna Poznikhirenko
- (Romania) Oana Georgeta Simion
- (Serbia) Milana Spremo

== Champions ==
=== Singles ===
- Incompleted due to 2016 Turkish coup d'état attempt

=== Doubles ===
- (Georgia (country)) Ekaterine Gorgodze / (Georgia (country)) Sofia Shapatava vs. (Uzbekistan) Akgul Amanmuradova / (Russia) Natela Dzalamidze, not played
