= 2016 Fed Cup Europe/Africa Zone Group II – play-offs =

The play-offs of the 2016 Fed Cup Europe/Africa Zone Group II were the final stages of the Group II zonal competition involving teams from Europe and Africa. Using the positions determined in their pools, the seven teams faced off to determine their placing in the 2015 Fed Cup Europe/Africa Zone Group II. The top two teams advanced to Group I, and the bottom two teams were relegated down to the Group III for the next year.

Placing	Pool A	Pool B
1	Denmark	Austria
2	Lithuania	Bosnia and Herzegovina
3	Finland	Egypt
4	—	Liechtenstein

== Promotional play-offs ==
The first-placed teams of each pool played against the second-placed teams of the other pool in head-to-head rounds. The winner of each round advanced to the 2017 Europe/Africa Zone Group I.

=== Denmark vs. Bosnia and Herzegovina ===
Denmark
1
Gezira Sporting Club, Cairo, Egypt
16 April 2016
Outdoor clay

Bosnia and Herzegovina
2

			1	2	3
1	(Denmark) (Bosnia and Herzegovina)	Emilie Francati; Ema Burgić Bucko	3; 6	7^{7} 6^{2}	6; 1
2	(Denmark) (Bosnia and Herzegovina)	Karen Barritza; Dea Herdželaš	0; 6	3; 6
3	(Denmark) (Bosnia and Herzegovina)	Karen Barritza / Emilie Francati; Ema Burgić Bucko / Dea Herdželaš	4; 6	3; 6

=== Lithuania vs. Austria ===
Lithuania
0
Gezira Sporting Club, Cairo, Egypt
16 April 2016
Outdoor clay

Austria
2

			1	2	3
1	(Lithuania) (Austria)	Gerda Zykutė; Barbara Haas	1; 6	1; 6
2	(Lithuania) (Austria)	Paulina Bakaitė; Tamira Paszek	2; 6	1; 6
3	(Lithuania) (Austria)	Pauline Bakaitė / Gerda Zykutė; Julia Grabher / Sandra Klemenschits				not played

== Relegation play-offs ==
The third-placed teams of the pools played against each other in a head-to-head round. The loser of each round was relegated to the 2017 Europe/Africa Zone Group III.

=== Egypt vs. Finland ===
Egypt
2
Gezira Sporting Club, Cairo, Egypt
16 April 2016
Outdoor clay

Finland
0

			1	2	3
1	(Egypt) (Finland)	Dona Abo Habaga; Milka-Emilia Pasanen	6; 3	7^{7} 6^{2}
2	(Egypt) (Finland)	Sandra Samir; Mia Eklund	6; 0	6; 4
3	(Egypt) (Finland)	Laila Elnimr / Sandra Samir; Mia Eklund / Milka-Emilia Pasanen				not played

== Final placements ==
Placing	Teams	
Promoted/First	Austria	Bosnia and Herzegovina
Third	Denmark	Lithuania
Fifth	Egypt	
Relegated/Seventh	Liechtenstein	Finland

- Austria and Bosnia and Herzegovina were promoted to Europe/Africa Zone Group I in 2017
- Liechtenstein and Finland were relegated to Europe/Africa Zone Group III in 2017
