= 2016 Fed Cup Europe/Africa Zone Group II – Pool B =

Group B of the 2016 Fed Cup Europe/Africa Zone Group II was one of two pools in the Europe/Africa zone of the 2016 Fed Cup. Four teams competed in a round robin competition, with the top team and the bottom teams proceeding to their respective sections of the play-offs: the top team played for advancement to Group I, while the third placed team faced potential relegation to Group III. The bottom team was automatically relegated to Group III.

== Standings ==
		LIE	EGY	AUT	BIH	RR; W–L	Set; W–L	Game; W–L	Standings
58	Liechtenstein		1–2	3–0	1–2	1–2	12–11	105–108	4
65	Egypt	2–1		0–3	0–3	1–2	5–15	74–102	3
68	Austria	0–3	3–0		2–1	2–1	13–9	111–93	1
73	Bosnia and Herzegovina	2–1	3–0	1–2		2–1	12–7	97–84	2

== Round-robin ==
=== Liechtenstein vs. Bosnia and Herzegovina ===
Liechtenstein
1
Gezira Sporting Club, Cairo, Egypt
13 April 2016
Outdoor clay

Bosnia and Herzegovina
2

			1	2	3
1	(Liechtenstein) (Bosnia and Herzegovina)	Kathinka von Deichmann; Ema Burgić Bucko	3; 6	1; 6
2	(Liechtenstein) (Bosnia and Herzegovina)	Stephanie Vogt; Dea Herdželaš	5; 7	6; 2	4; 6
3	(Liechtenstein) (Bosnia and Herzegovina)	Stephanie Vogt / Kathinka von Deichmann; Ema Burgić Bucko / Anita Husarić	7^{13} 6^{11}	6; 4

=== Egypt vs. Austria ===
Egypt
0
Gezira Sporting Club, Cairo, Egypt
13 April 2016
Outdoor clay

Austria
3

			1	2	3
1	(Egypt) (Austria)	Dona Abo Habaga; Barbara Haas	1; 6	1; 6
2	(Egypt) (Austria)	Sandra Samir; Tamira Paszek	4; 6	4; 6
3	(Egypt) (Austria)	Laila Elnimr / Sandra Samir; Julia Grabher / Sandra Klemenschits	4; 6	6; 2	4; 6

=== Liechtenstein vs. Austria ===
Liechtenstein
3
Gezira Sporting Club, Cairo, Egypt
14 April 2016
Outdoor clay

Austria
0

			1	2	3
1	(Liechtenstein) (Austria)	Kathinka von Deichmann; Barbara Haas	1; 6	6; 4	6; 3
2	(Liechtenstein) (Austria)	Stephanie Vogt; Tamira Paszek	2; 6	6; 1	6; 3
3	(Liechtenstein) (Austria)	Stephanie Vogt / Kathinka von Deichmann; Julia Grabher / Sandra Klemenschits	7; 5	6^{5} 7^{7}	6; 4

=== Egypt vs. Bosnia and Herzegovina ===
Egypt
0
Gezira Sporting Club, Cairo, Egypt
14 April 2016
Outdoor clay

Bosnia and Herzegovina
2

			1	2	3
1	(Egypt) (Bosnia and Herzegovina)	Lamis Alhussein Abdel Aziz; Ema Burgić Bucko	0; 6	3; 6
2	(Egypt) (Bosnia and Herzegovina)	Sandra Samir; Dea Herdželaš	3; 6	4; 6
3	(Egypt) (Bosnia and Herzegovina)	Dona Abo Habaga / Laila Elnimr; Ema Burgić Bucko / Dea Herdželaš	3; 6	5; 7

=== Egypt vs. Liechtenstein ===
Egypt
2
Gezira Sporting Club, Cairo, Egypt
15 April 2016
Outdoor clay

Liechtenstein
1

			1	2	3
1	(Egypt) (Liechtenstein)	Lamis Alhussein Abdel Aziz; Kathinka von Deichmann	2; 6	2; 6
2	(Egypt) (Liechtenstein)	Sandra Samir; Stephanie Vogt	6; 2	3; 6	6; 1
3	(Egypt) (Liechtenstein)	Laila Elnimr / Sandra Samir; Stephanie Vogt / Kathinka von Deichmann	6; 0	7^{7} 6^{3}

=== Austria vs. Bosnia and Herzegovina ===
Austria
2
Gezira Sporting Club, Cairo, Egypt
15 April 2016
Outdoor clay

Bosnia and Herzegovina
1

			1	2	3
1	(Austria) (Bosnia and Herzegovina)	Julia Grabher; Ema Burgić Bucko	4; 6	5; 7
2	(Austria) (Bosnia and Herzegovina)	Barbara Haas; Dea Herdželaš	7; 5	6; 1
3	(Austria) (Bosnia and Herzegovina)	Barbara Haas / Sandra Klemenschits; Dea Herdželaš / Anita Husarić	6; 1	6; 3
