= 2016 Fed Cup Europe/Africa Zone Group II – Pool A =

Group A of the 2016 Fed Cup Europe/Africa Zone Group II was one of two pools in the Europe/Africa zone of the 2016 Fed Cup. Three teams competed in a round robin competition, with the top team and the bottom team proceeding to their respective sections of the play-offs: the top team played for advancement to Group I, while the bottom team faced potential relegation to Group III.

== Standings ==
		FIN	LTU	DEN	RR; W–L	Set; W–L	Game; W–L	Standings
55	Finland		1–2	0–3	0–2	3–11	39–76	3
59	Lithuania	2–1		0–3	1–1	5–9	53–69	2
67	Denmark	3–0	3–0		2–0	12–0	73–20	1

== Round-robin ==
=== Lithuania vs. Denmark ===
Lithuania
0
Gezira Sporting Club, Cairo, Egypt
13 April 2016
Outdoor clay

Denmark
3

			1	2	3
1	(Lithuania) (Denmark)	Iveta Daujotaitė; Emilie Francati	5; 7	0; 6
2	(Lithuania) (Denmark)	Paulina Bakaitė; Karen Barritza	2; 6	1; 6
3	(Lithuania) (Denmark)	Paulina Bakaitė / Gerda Zykutė; Karen Barritza / Emilie Francati	1; 6	4; 6

=== Finland vs. Denmark ===
Finland
0
Gezira Sporting Club, Cairo, Egypt
14 April 2016
Outdoor clay

Denmark
3

			1	2	3
1	(Finland) (Denmark)	Monica Malinen; Emilie Francati	1; 6	1; 6
2	(Finland) (Denmark)	Mia Eklund; Karen Barritza	3; 6	0; 6
3	(Finland) (Denmark)	Mia Eklund / Milka-Emilia Pasanen; Karen Barritza / Emilie Francati	1; 6	1; 6

=== Finland vs. Lithuania ===
Finland
1
Gezira Sporting Club, Cairo, Egypt
15 April 2016
Outdoor clay

Lithuania
2

			1	2	3
1	(Finland) (Lithuania)	Ella Leivo; Iveta Daujotaitė	3; 6	1; 6
2	(Finland) (Lithuania)	Mia Eklund; Pauline Bakaitė	4; 6	6; 2	6^{3} 7^{7}
3	(Finland) (Lithuania)	Monica Malinen / Milka-Emilia Pasanen; Iveta Daujotaitė / Gerda Zykutė	6; 3	0; 6	6; 4
