= Aleksandra Pospelova =

Russian tennis player

Aleksandra Pospelova Александра Поспелова
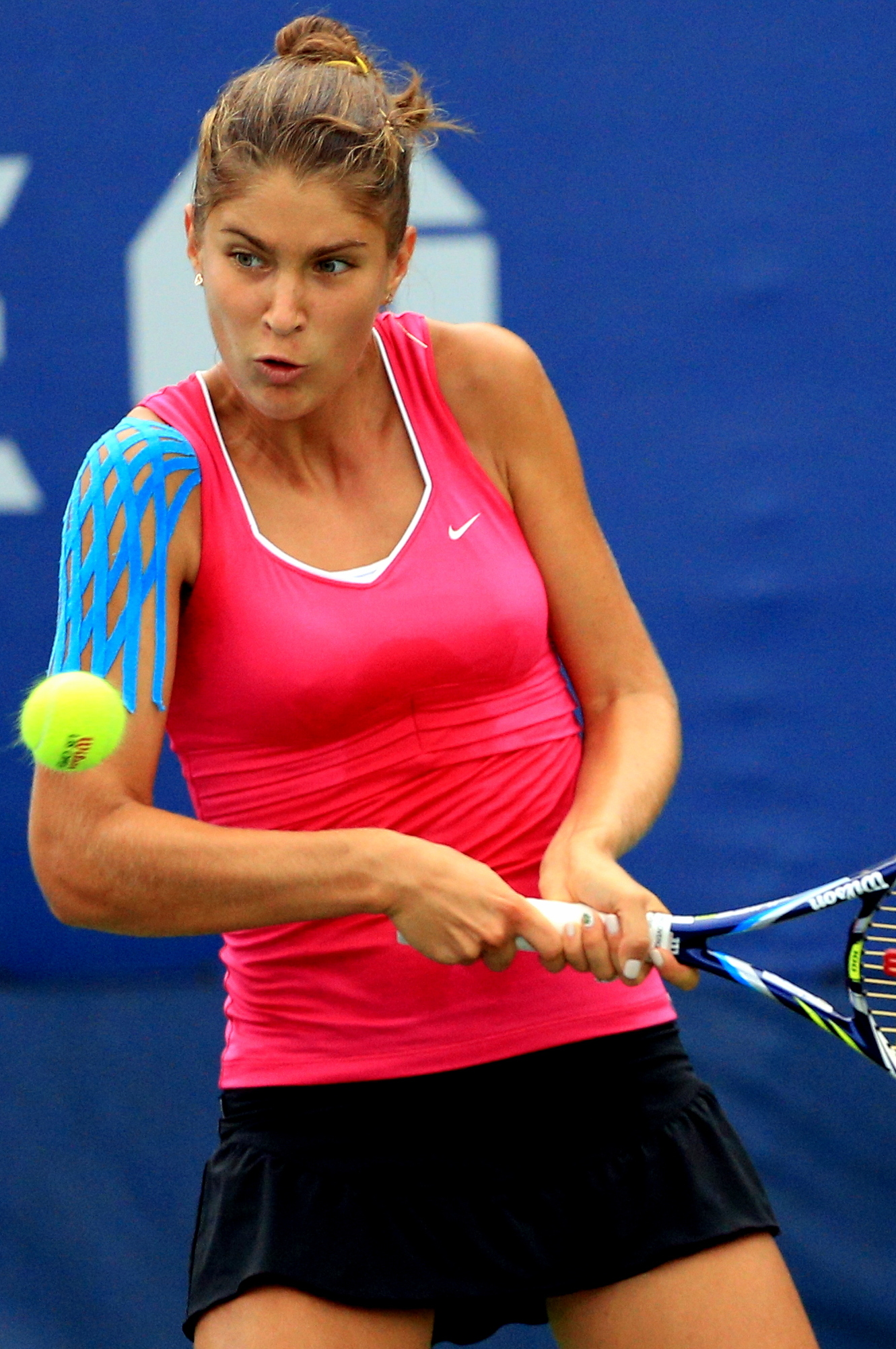
- Pospelova at the 2015 US Open
- Country (sports): Russia
- Born: 22 April 1998 (age 28) Moscow
- Prize money: $54,551

Singles
- Career record: 158–151
- Career titles: 2 ITF
- Highest ranking: No. 537 (6 February 2017)

Doubles
- Career record: 176–104
- Career titles: 12 ITF
- Highest ranking: No. 310 (23 October 2017)

Aleksandra Romanovna Pospelova (Russian: Александра Романовна Поспелова; born 22 April 1998) is a Russian former tennis player.

Pospelova won two singles and twelve doubles titles on the ITF Circuit. She reached her career-high singles ranking of No. 537 on 6 February 2017, and her career-high doubles ranking of world No. 310 on 23 October 2017.

In 2015, Pospelova won the girls' doubles title at the US Open, partnering Viktória Kužmová; together they defeated Anna Kalinskaya and Anastasia Potapova in the final.

== Junior Grand Slam tournament final ==
=== Girls' doubles (1–0) ===
Result	Year	Tournament	Surface	Partner	Opponents	Score
Win	2015	US Open	Hard	(Slovakia) Viktória Kužmová	(Russia) Anna Kalinskaya (Russia) Anastasia Potapova	7–5, 6–2

== ITF Circuit finals ==
=== Singles: 4 (2 titles, 2 runner-ups) ===
Legend $25,000 tournaments $10/15,000 tournaments	Finals by surface Hard (1–0) Clay (1–2)

Result	W–L	Date	Tournament	Tier	Surface	Opponent	Score
Loss	0–1	Nov 2015	ITF Antalya, Turkey	10,000	Clay	(North Macedonia) Lina Gjorcheska	3–6, 6–4, 0–6
Win	1–1	Apr 2016	ITF Heraklion, Greece	10,000	Hard	(Germany) Laura Schaeder	6–1, 6–4
Loss	1–2	Sep 2016	Batumi Ladies Open, Georgia	10,000	Clay	(Georgia (country)) Mariam Bolkvadze	4–6, 6–7^{(8)}
Win	2–2	Jan 2017	ITF Antalya, Turkey	15,000	Clay	(Ukraine) Anastasiya Vasylyeva	6–4, 1–6, 6–4

=== Doubles: 26 (12 titles, 14 runner-ups) ===
Legend $50/60,000 tournaments $25,000 tournaments $10/15,000 tournaments	Finals by surface Hard (6–4) Clay (6–10)

Result	W–L	Date	Tournament	Tier	Surface	Partner	Opponents	Score
Win	1–0	Apr 2015	ITF Shymkent, Kazakhstan	10,000	Clay	(Russia) Irina Lidkovskaya	(Russia) Elizaveta Khabarova (Uzbekistan) Guzal Yusupova	7–6^{(5)}, 6–1
Loss	1–1	Nov 2015	ITF Antalya, Turkey	10,000	Clay	(Ukraine) Gyulnara Nazarova	(North Macedonia) Lina Gjorcheska (Croatia) Iva Primorac	4–6, 3–6
Win	2–1	Mar 2016	ITF Heraklion, Greece	10,000	Hard	(Russia) Alina Silich	(United Kingdom) Amanda Carreras (Italy) Alice Savoretti	6–2, 6–2
Win	3–1	Apr 2016	ITF Heraklion, Greece	10,000	Hard	(Russia) Alina Silich	(Italy) Deborah Chiesa (Croatia) Adrijana Lekaj	6–3, 6–4
Loss	3–2	Aug 2016	ITF Moscow, Russia	10,000	Clay	(Russia) Polina Novoselova	(Russia) Anastasia Frolova (Russia) Margarita Lazareva	2–6, 0–6
Win	4–2	Oct 2016	Liuzhou Open, China	50,000	Hard	(Russia) Veronika Kudermetova	(United States) Jacqueline Cako (Uzbekistan) Sabina Sharipova	6–2, 6–4
Loss	4–3	Jan 2017	ITF Antalya, Turkey	15,000	Clay	(Russia) Olesya Pervushina	(Colombia) María Herazo González (Ukraine) Kateryna Sliusar	6–7^{(1)}, 0–6
Loss	4–4	Jul 2017	Bursa Cup, Turkey	60,000	Clay	(Bosnia and Herzegovina) Dea Herdželaš	(Russia) Valentyna Ivakhnenko (Ukraine) Anastasiya Vasylyeva	3–6, 7–5, [1–10]
Win	5–4	Sep 2017	ITF Antalya, Turkey	15,000	Clay	(Moldova) Adriana Sosnovschi	(Paraguay) Lara Escauriza (Chile) Bárbara Gatica	7–6^{(2)}, 7–5
Win	6–4	Jan 2018	ITF Antalya, Turkey	15,000	Clay	(Georgia (country)) Sofia Shapatava	(Germany) Tayisiya Morderger (Germany) Yana Morderger	6–2, 6–2
Loss	6–5	May 2019	ITF Antalya, Turkey	W15	Clay	(Russia) Ekaterina Kazionova	(Switzerland) Jenny Dürst (Switzerland) Chiara Grimm	6–3, 1–6, [3–10]
Win	7–5	Aug 2019	ITF Moscow, Russia	W15	Clay	(Russia) Amina Anshba	(Russia) Vlada Koval (Russia) Evgeniya Levashova	6–4, 6–3
Loss	7–6	Aug 2021	ITF Warmbad-Villach, Austria	W15	Clay	(Bosnia and Herzegovina) Anita Husarić	(Italy) Melania Delai (Slovenia) Pia Lovrič	6–0, 2–6, [3–10]
Win	8–6	Oct 2021	ITF Kazan, Russia	W15	Hard	(Russia) Ekaterina Maklakova	(Russia) Maria Krupenina (Russia) Ekaterina Ovcharenko	6–1, 6–1
Win	9–6	Nov 2021	ITF Antalya, Turkey	W15	Clay	(Russia) Ksenia Laskutova	(South Korea) Back Da-yeon (China) Tian Fangran	2–6, 6–2, [10–6]
Loss	9–7	Feb 2022	ITF Antalya, Turkey	W15	Clay	(Russia) Evgeniya Burdina	(Turkey) Doğa Türkmen (Turkey) Melis Ayda Uyar	6–4, 6–7^{(4)}, [7–10]
Loss	9–8	May 2022	ITF Monastir, Tunisia	25,000	Hard	(Uzbekistan) Nigina Abduraimova	(Japan) Erika Sema (China) Liu Fangzhou	3–6, 2–6
Win	10–8	Aug 2022	ITF Ust-Kamenogorsk, Kazakhstan	25,000	Hard	(Russia) Ekaterina Maklakova	(Russia) Ekaterina Kazionova (Kazakhstan) Zhibek Kulambayeva	7–6^{(5)}, 6–1
Loss	10–9	Sep 2022	ITF Casablanca, Morocco	W15	Clay	(Croatia) Mariana Dražić	(Finland) Laura Hietaranta (Netherlands) Stéphanie Visscher	6–1, 5–7, [8–10]
Loss	10–10	Dec 2022	ITF Antalya, Turkey	W15	Clay	(Russia) Ksenia Laskutova	(Chinese Taipei) Li Yu-yun (Russia) Anna Zyryanova	6–3, 4–6, [7–10]
Loss	10–11	Feb 2023	ITF Sharm El Sheikh, Egypt	W15	Hard	(Russia) Nina Rudiukova	(Norway) Emilie Lindh Gallagher (Hungary) Luca Udvardy	4–6, 7–5, [3–10]
Win	11–11	Mar 2023	ITF Sharm El Sheikh	W15	Hard	(Norway) Emilie Lindh Gallagher	(United States) Jessica Failla (United States) Anna Ulyashchenko	6–2, 3–6, [11–9]
Loss	11–12	Oct 2023	ITF Sharm El Sheikh	W15	Hard	Daria Zelinskaya	(Romania) Elena-Teodora Cadar (Kosovo) Arlinda Rushiti	6–2, 3–6, [9–11]
Loss	11–13	Oct 2023	ITF Sharm El Sheikh	W15	Hard	Daria Zelinskaya	(Romania) Karola Bejenaru (Romania) Elena-Teodora Cadar	3–6, 4–6
Loss	11–14	Nov 2023	ITF Antalya, Turkey	W15	Clay	Lidiia Rasskovskaia	(Slovakia) Irina Balus (Slovakia) Anika Jaskova	6–3, 2–6, [8–10]
Win	12–14	Nov 2023	ITF Antalya, Turkey	W15	Clay	Lidiia Rasskovskaia	(Romania) Iulia Andreea Ionescu (Romania) Anastasia Safta	6–7^{(3)}, 6–4, [10–1]
