= Bursa Cup =

- 2017 Bursa Cup

ITF Women's Tour
- Event name: Bursa
- Location: Bursa, Turkey
- Venue: Podyum Park Tenis Tesisleri
- Category: ITF Women's Circuit
- Surface: Clay
- Draw: 32S/32Q/16D
- Prize money: $60,000
- Website: www.podyumtenis.com

The Bursa Cup is a tournament for professional female tennis players played on outdoor clay courts. The event was classified as a $60,000 ITF Women's Circuit tournament and held 2015–2017 in Bursa, Turkey.

== Past finals ==
=== Singles ===
Year	Champion	Runner-up	Score
2017	(Russia) Sofya Zhuk	(Turkey) İpek Soylu	4–6, 6–3, 7–6^{(7–5)}
2016	unfinished due to the 2016 Turkish coup d'état attempt		
2015	(Turkey) İpek Soylu	(Latvia) Anastasija Sevastova	7–5, 3–6, 6–1

=== Doubles ===
Year	Champions	Runners-up	Score
2017	(Russia) Valentyna Ivakhnenko (Ukraine) Anastasiya Vasylyeva	(Bosnia and Herzegovina) Dea Herdželaš (Russia) Aleksandra Pospelova	6–3, 5–7, [10–1]
2016	unfinished due to the 2016 Turkish coup d'état attempt		
2015	(Russia) Marina Melnikova (Spain) Laura Pous Tió	(Georgia (country)) Sofia Shapatava (Ukraine) Anastasiya Vasylyeva	6–4, 6–4
