= Sofia Shapatava =

Georgian tennis player

Sofia Shapatava სოფია შაფათავა
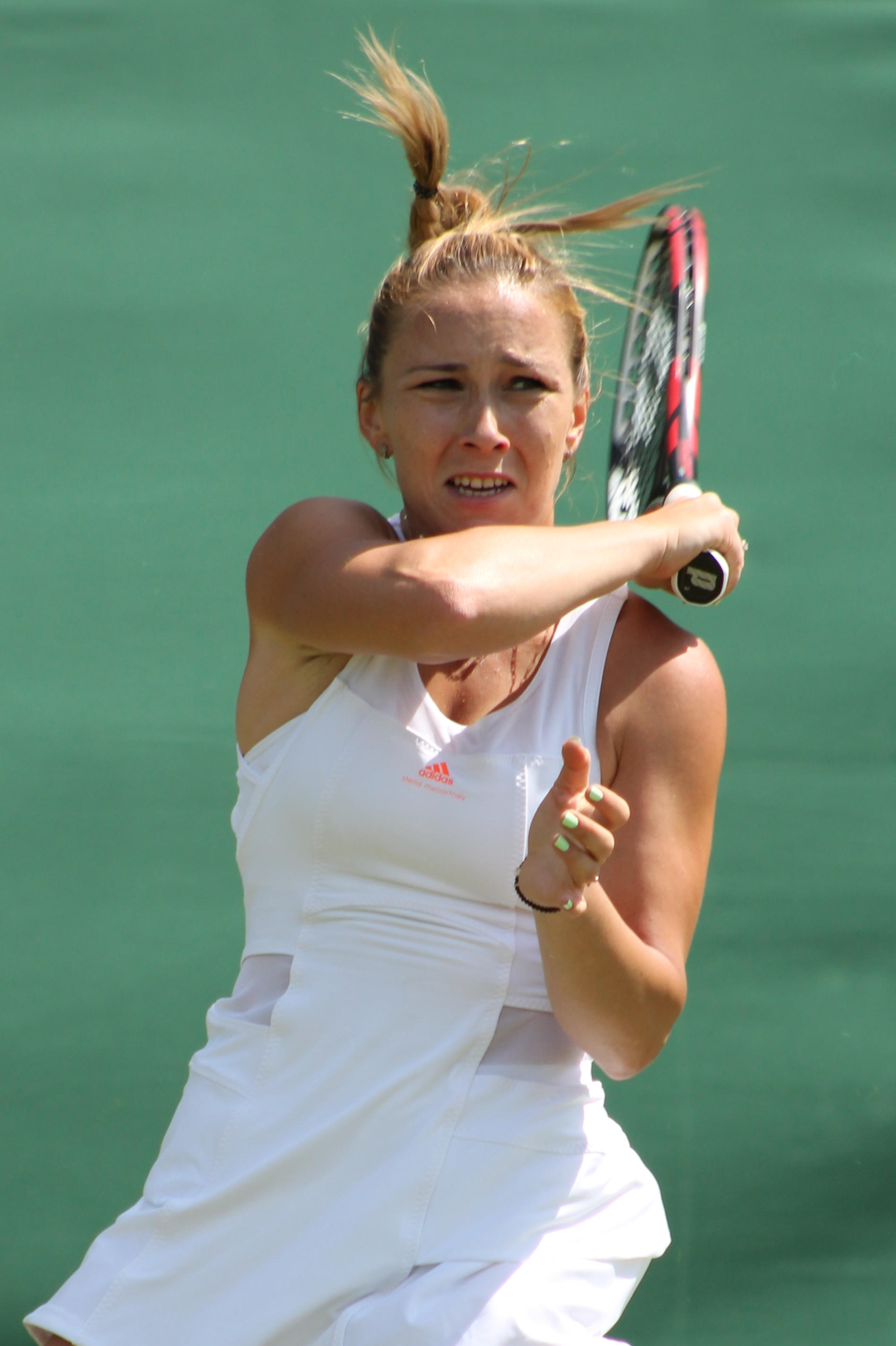
- Sofia Shapatava in 2014
- Country (sports): Georgia
- Residence: Tbilisi, Georgia
- Born: 12 January 1989 (age 37) Tbilisi, Soviet Union
- Turned pro: 2007
- Plays: Right (two-handed backhand)
- Prize money: $482,981

Singles
- Career record: 594–568
- Career titles: 4 ITF
- Highest ranking: No. 186 (8 September 2014)
- Current ranking: No. 462 (10 August 2026)

Grand Slam singles results
- Australian Open: Q1 (2014)
- French Open: 1R (2014)
- Wimbledon: Q1 (2014)
- US Open: Q3 (2014)

Doubles
- Career record: 421–368
- Career titles: 34 ITF
- Highest ranking: No. 132 (9 November 2015)
- Current ranking: No. 1129 (10 August 2026)

Team competitions
- Fed Cup: 31–29
- Last updated on: 19 August 2026.

Sofia Shapatava (Georgian: სოფია შაფათავა, romanized: sopia shapatava, pronounced [sopʰia ʃapʰatʰava]; born 12 January 1989) is a Georgian tennis player. On 8 September 2014, she reached her career-high singles ranking of world No. 186. On 9 November 2015, she peaked at No. 132 in the doubles rankings. She has won four singles and 34 doubles titles on the ITF Women's Circuit.

Playing for Georgia Fed Cup team, Shapatava has a win–loss record of 31–29 (as of July 2024).

== Career ==
She made her Grand Slam main-draw debut at the 2014 French Open where she qualified, before losing to 2009 champion, Svetlana Kuznetsova, in the first round.

== Grand Slam singles performance timeline ==
Key
W	F	SF	QF	#R	RR	Q#	DNQ	A	NH

(W) winner; (F) finalist; (SF) semifinalist; (QF) quarterfinalist; (#R) rounds 4, 3, 2, 1; (RR) round-robin stage; (Q#) qualification round; (DNQ) did not qualify; (A) absent; (NH) not held; (SR) strike rate (events won / competed); (W–L) win–loss record.
To avoid confusion and double counting, these charts are updated at the conclusion of a tournament or when the player's participation has ended.

Tournament	2014	2015	2016	W–L
Australian Open	Q1	A	A	0–0
French Open	1R	A	A	0–1
Wimbledon	Q1	A	A	0–0
US Open	Q3	A	Q1	0–0
Win–loss	0–1	0–0	0–0	0–1
Career statistics
Year-end ranking	210	238	203	

== ITF Circuit finals ==
=== Singles: 17 (4 titles, 13 runner-ups) ===
Legend $50,000 tournaments $25,000 tournaments $10/15,000 tournaments	Finals by surface Hard (0–6) Clay (3–7) Grass (1–0)

Result	W–L	Date	Tournament	Tier	Surface	Opponent	Score
Loss	0–1	Aug 2006	ITF Baku, Azerbaijan	10,000	Clay	(Russia) Yulia Solonitskaya	4–6, 1–6
Loss	0–2	Aug 2008	ITF Penza, Russia	50,000	Clay	(Russia) Ksenia Pervak	4–6, 1–6
Loss	0–3	Sep 2009	Batumi Ladies Open, Georgia	25,000	Clay	(Georgia (country)) Oksana Kalashnikova	6–4, 3–6, 2–6
Loss	0–4	May 2010	ITF Bukhara, Uzbekistan	25,000	Hard	(Greece) Eirini Georgatou	6–1, 0–6, 3–6
Loss	0–5	Jul 2010	ITF Almaty, Kazakhstan	25,000	Hard	(Netherlands) Richèl Hogenkamp	2–6, 3–6
Loss	0–6	Jun 2011	ITF Kharkiv, Ukraine	25,000	Clay	(Lithuania) Lina Stančiūtė	2–6, 1–6
Loss	0–7	Feb 2013	ITF Moscow, Russia	25,000	Hard	(Ukraine) Maryna Zanevska	4–6, 6–7
Loss	0–8	Aug 2013	Neva Cup St. Petersburg, Russia	25,000	Clay	(Russia) Polina Vinogradova	4–6, 6–7
Win	1–8	Dec 2014	ITF Lucknow, India	15,000	Grass	(Russia) Anastasiya Komardina	6–3, 6–2
Loss	1–9	Nov 2015	ITF Équeurdreville, France	25,000	Hard (i)	(Netherlands) Lesley Kerkhove	5–7, 3–6
Win	2–9	Mar 2017	ITF Antalya, Turkey	15,000	Clay	(Turkey) Ayla Aksu	2–6, 7–6^{(3)}, 7–6^{(5)}
Loss	2–10	Jan 2018	ITF Antalya, Turkey	15,000	Clay	(Russia) Varvara Gracheva	5–7, 0–6
Loss	2–11	Nov 2019	ITF Gwalior, India	25,000	Hard	(China) Lu Jiajing	5–7, 2–6
Loss	2–12	Sep 2021	ITF Frýdek-Místek, Czech Republic	25,000	Clay	(Hungary) Panna Udvardy	2–6, 1–6
Win	3–12	Jan 2025	ITF Antalya, Turkey	W15	Clay	Diana Demidova	6–3, 4–6, 6–4
Loss	3–13	Mar 2025	ITF Sharm El Sheikh, Egypt	W15	Hard	(Bulgaria) Isabella Shinikova	1–6, 2–6
Win	4–13	Nov 2025	ITF Antalya, Turkey	W35	Clay	(Czech Republic) Julie Štruplová	2–6, 7–5, 6–3

=== Doubles: 62 (34 titles, 28 runner-ups) ===
Legend W100 tournaments W50/60/75 tournaments W25/35 tournaments W10/15 tournaments	Finals by surface Hard (6–10) Clay (21–14) Grass (0–1) Carpet (7–3)

Result	W–L	Date	Tournament	Tier	Surface	Partner	Opponents	Score
Win	1–0	Aug 2006	ITF Baku, Azerbaijan	10,000	Clay	(Georgia (country)) Teona Tzertzvadze	(Azerbaijan) Elina Gasanova (Georgia (country)) Sofia Kvatsabaia	6–4, 6–2
Loss	1–1	Sep 2007	ITF Tbilisi, Georgia	10,000	Clay	(Georgia (country)) Tinatin Kavlashvili	(Russia) Avgusta Tsybysheva (Georgia (country)) Manana Shapakidze	1–6, 6–1, [8–10]
Loss	1–2	Mar 2008	ITF Moscow, Russia	25,000	Hard	(Russia) Marina Shamayko	(Russia) Anastasia Pavlyuchenkova (Czech Republic) Nikola Fraňková	3–6, 2–6
Win	2–2	Aug 2008	ITF Penza, Russia	50,000	Clay	(Kyrgyzstan) Ksenia Palkina	(Ukraine) Irina Buryachok (Czech Republic) Nikola Fraňková	6–4, 6–4
Loss	2–3	Nov 2008	ITF Astana, Kazakhstan	25,000	Hard	(Russia) Marina Shamayko	(Russia) Marina Melnikova (Russia) Anastasia Poltoratskaya	1–6, 1–6
Win	3–3	Aug 2009	ITF Bassano del Grappa, Italy	10,000	Clay	(Russia) Marina Shamayko	(Italy) Evelyn Mayr (Italy) Julia Mayr	6–1, 5–7, [10–8]
Win	4–3	May 2010	ITF Bukhara, Uzbekistan	25,000	Hard	(Georgia (country)) Tatia Mikadze	(Indonesia) Yayuk Basuki (Indonesia) Jessy Rompies	6–3, 6–3
Win	5–3	Sep 2010	Batumi Ladies Open, Georgia	25,000	Clay	(Georgia (country)) Tatia Mikadze	(Poland) Paula Kania (Hungary) Zsófia Susányi	6–3, 6–2
Loss	5–4	Jun 2011	ITF Rome, Italy	25,000	Clay	(Russia) Marina Shamayko	(Paraguay) Verónica Cepede Royg (Argentina) Paula Ormaechea	5–7, 4–6
Loss	5–5	Jun 2011	Open de Pozoblanco, Spain	50,000	Hard	(Russia) Marina Melnikova	(Russia) Nina Bratchikova (France) Irena Pavlovic	2–6, 4–6
Loss	5–6	Aug 2011	ITF Mamaia, Romania	25,000	Clay	(Russia) Marina Shamayko	(Romania) Elena Bogdan (Romania) Alexandra Cadanţu	2–6, 2–6
Win	6–6	Oct 2011	ITF Yerevan, Armenia	25,000	Clay	(Georgia (country)) Tatia Mikadze	(Ukraine) Elizaveta Ianchuk (Ukraine) Olga Ianchuk	6–1, 6–4
Win	7–6	Feb 2012	ITF Rancho Mirage, United States	25,000	Hard	(Georgia (country)) Ekaterine Gorgodze	(Russia) Valeria Solovyeva (Slovakia) Lenka Wienerová	6–2, 3–6, [10–6]
Loss	7–7	Mar 2013	ITF Antalya, Turkey	10,000	Clay	(Ukraine) Alona Fomina	(United States) Anamika Bhargava (United States) Nicole Melichar	7–6, 3–6, [7–10]
Win	8–7	Jul 2013	Reinert Open, Germany	50,000	Clay	(Georgia (country)) Anna Tatishvili	(France) Claire Feuerstein (Czech Republic) Renata Voráčová	6–4, 6–4
Loss	8–8	Oct 2013	ITF Hamamatsu, Japan	25,000	Grass	(Switzerland) Belinda Bencic	(Japan) Shuko Aoyama (Japan) Junri Namigata	4–6, 3–6
Loss	8–9	Oct 2013	ITF İstanbul, Turkey	25,000	Hard	(Ukraine) Anastasiya Vasylyeva	(Turkey) Çağla Büyükakçay (Turkey) Pemra Özgen	3–6, 2–6
Win	9–9	Nov 2013	ITF Bucha, Ukraine	25,000	Carpet (i)	(Ukraine) Anastasiya Vasylyeva	(Ukraine) Anhelina Kalinina (Russia) Elizaveta Kulichkova	7–6^{(7)}, 6–2
Win	10–9	Feb 2014	Open de l'Isère, France	25,000	Carpet (i)	(Ukraine) Anastasiya Vasylyeva	(Ukraine) Kateryna Kozlova (Russia) Margarita Gasparyan	6–1, 6–4
Win	11–9	Feb 2014	ITF Tallinn, Estonia	15,000	Carpet (i)	(Slovenia) Maša Zec Peškirič	(Hungary) Ágnes Bukta (Bulgaria) Viktoriya Tomova	6–4, 7–6
Win	12–9	Jun 2014	ITF Padua, Italy	25,000	Clay	(Italy) Gioia Barbieri	(Brazil) Paula Cristina Gonçalves (Argentina) Florencia Molinero	6–4, 0–6, [14–12]
Loss	12–10	Sep 2014	ITF Monterrey, Mexico	25,000	Hard	(Argentina) Florencia Molinero	(Slovenia) Nastja Kolar (Slovakia) Chantal Škamlová	3–6, 6–2, [5–10]
Loss	12–11	Nov 2014	ITF Minsk, Belarus	25,000	Hard (i)	(Russia) Olga Doroshina	(Belarus) Lidziya Marozava (Belarus) Ilona Kremen	3–6, 4–6
Loss	12–12	Mar 2015	ITF Solarino, Italy	10,000	Carpet	(Russia) Olga Doroshina	(Germany) Laura Schäder (Netherlands) Janneke Wikkerink	4–6, 6–2, [7–10]
Loss	12–13	May 2015	ITF La Marsa, Tunisia	25,000	Clay	(Ukraine) Anastasiya Vasylyeva	(Turkey) Pemra Özgen (Turkey) İpek Soylu	6–3, 3–6, [4–10]
Win	13–13	May 2015	ITF Caserta, Italy	25,000	Clay	(Georgia (country)) Ekaterine Gorgodze	(Italy) Alice Matteucci (Turkey) İpek Soylu	6–0, 7–6^{(6)}
Win	14–13	Jun 2015	Bella Cup Toruń, Poland	25,000	Clay	(Georgia (country)) Ekaterine Gorgodze	(Poland) Magdalena Fręch (Philippines) Katharina Lehnert	6–4, 6–4
Loss	14–14	Jul 2015	Bursa Cup, Turkey	50,000	Clay	(Ukraine) Anastasiya Vasylyeva	(Russia) Marina Melnikova (Spain) Laura Pous-Tió	4–6, 4–6
Win	15–14	Aug 2015	ITF Mamaia, Romania	25,000	Clay	(Russia) Anastasiya Komardina	(Switzerland) Xenia Knoll (Switzerland) Amra Sadiković	6–3, 5–7, [10–8]
Win	16–14	Sep 2015	Sofia Cup, Bulgaria	25,000	Clay	(Ukraine) Anastasiya Vasylyeva	(Bulgaria) Elitsa Kostova (Czech Republic) Kateřina Kramperová	6–2, 6–2
Win	17–14	Sep 2015	ITF Dobrich, Bulgaria	25,000	Clay	(Ukraine) Anastasiya Vasylyeva	(Bulgaria) Elitsa Kostova (Czech Republic) Kateřina Kramperová	6–2, 6–0
Win	18–14	Sep 2015	ITF Bucha, Ukraine	25,000	Clay	(Georgia (country)) Ekaterine Gorgodze	(Ukraine) Olga Ianchuk (Ukraine) Anastasiya Vasylyeva	7–5, 6–2
Loss	18–15	Jun 2016	Internazionale di Roma, Italy	50,000	Clay	(Hungary) Réka Luca Jani	(Turkey) İpek Soylu (China) Xu Shilin	5–7, 1–6
Loss	18–16	Jul 2016	ITF Turin, Italy	25,000	Clay	(Italy) Alice Matteucci	(North Macedonia) Lina Gjorcheska (Slovenia) Dalila Jakupović	3–6, 3–6
Finalist (Note: cancelled due to the 2016 Turkish coup d'état attempt.)	–NP–	Jul 2016	Bursa Cup, Turkey	50,000	Clay	(Georgia (country)) Ekaterine Gorgodze	(Uzbekistan) Akgul Amanmuradova (Russia) Natela Dzalamidze	cancelled
Loss	18–17	Sep 2016	Telavi Open, Georgia	25,000	Clay	(Georgia (country)) Tatia Mikadze	(Russia) Natela Dzalamidze (Russia) Veronika Kudermetova	4–6, 2–6
Loss	18–18	Oct 2016	ITF Chenzhou, China	25,000	Hard	(Russia) Angelina Gabueva	(United States) Jacqueline Cako (Bulgaria) Aleksandrina Naydenova	6–3, 4–6, [6–10]
Win	19–18	Mar 2017	ITF Antalya, Turkey	15,000	Clay	(Kyrgyzstan) Ksenia Palkina	(Slovakia) Sandra Jamrichová (Bosnia and Herzegovina) Jelena Simić	6–4, 7–5
Loss	19–19	May 2017	ITF Monzón, Spain	25,000	Hard	(Ukraine) Valeriya Strakhova	(Venezuela) Andrea Gámiz (Spain) Georgina García Pérez	3–6, 4–6
Win	20–19	Aug 2017	Ladies Open Hechingen, Germany	60,000	Clay	(Italy) Camilla Rosatello	(Germany) Romy Kölzer (Germany) Lena Rüffer	6–2, 6–4
Loss	20–20	Sep 2017	Batumi Ladies Open, Georgia	25,000	Clay	(Georgia (country)) Tatia Mikadze	(Belgium) Ysaline Bonaventure (Slovakia) Viktória Kužmová	1–6, 3–6
Win	21–20	Jan 2018	ITF Antalya, Turkey	15,000	Clay	(Ukraine) Anastasiya Vasylyeva	(Turkey) İpek Öz (Kyrgyzstan) Ksenia Palkina	5–7, 6–0, [13–11]
Win	22–20	Jan 2018	ITF Antalya, Turkey	15,000	Clay	(Russia) Aleksandra Pospelova	(Germany) Tayisiya Morderger (Germany) Yana Morderger	6–2, 6–2
Win	23–20	Mar 2018	ITF Pula, Italy	25,000	Clay	(Georgia (country)) Ekaterine Gorgodze	(Germany) Katharina Gerlach (Germany) Lena Rüffer	6–4, 7–6^{(5)}
Loss	23–21	Mar 2018	ITF Pula, Italy	25,000	Clay	(Ukraine) Anastasiya Vasylyeva	(Slovakia) Chantal Škamlová (Netherlands) Eva Wacanno	1–6, 7–5, [6–10]
Loss	23–22	May 2018	ITF San Severo, Italy	15,000	Clay	(Belarus) Sviatlana Pirazhenka	(Chinese Taipei) Chen Pei-hsuan (Chinese Taipei) Wu Fang-hsien	3–6, 4–6
Win	24–22	Jun 2018	ITF Óbidos, Portugal	25,000	Carpet	(Russia) Amina Anshba	(Romania) Laura-Ioana Andrei (Germany) Julia Wachaczyk	6–7^{(4)}, 6–0, [11–9]
Loss	24–23	Aug 2018	Ladies Open Hechingen, Germany	60,000	Clay	(Kyrgyzstan) Ksenia Palkina	(Russia) Polina Monova (Slovakia) Chantal Škamlová	4–6, 3–6
Win	25–23	Oct 2018	ITF Pula, Italy	25,000	Clay	(Russia) Amina Anshba	(Italy) Martina di Giuseppe (Italy) Anna-Giulia Remondina	7–6^{(5)}, 2–6, [10–6]
Loss	25–24	Apr 2019	ITF Óbidos, Portugal	25,000	Carpet	(United Kingdom) Emily Webley-Smith	(Spain) Cristina Bucșa (Spain) Georgina García Pérez	5–7, 5–7
Win	26–24	Apr 2019	ITF Óbidos, Portugal	25,000	Carpet	(United Kingdom) Emily Webley-Smith	(Georgia (country)) Mariam Bolkvadze (Slovenia) Nastja Kolar	6–1, 2–6, [11–9]
Win	27–24	May 2019	ITF Óbidos, Portugal	25,000	Carpet	(United Kingdom) Emily Webley-Smith	(Italy) Martina Colmegna (Colombia) María Herazo González	6–3, 6–0
Win	28–24	May 2019	ITF Óbidos, Portugal	25,000	Carpet	(United Kingdom) Emily Webley-Smith	(Italy) Martina Colmegna (Spain) Nuria Párrizas Díaz	6–4, 6–1
Win	29–24	Jun 2019	ITF Santa Margarita de Montbui, Spain	25,000	Hard	(United Kingdom) Emily Webley-Smith	(Bulgaria) Elitsa Kostova (United Kingdom) Samantha Murray	6–4, 7–5
Loss	29–25	Jul 2019	ITF Horb, Germany	25,000	Clay	(Uzbekistan) Albina Khabibulina	(Germany) Katharina Gerlach (Germany) Julia Wachaczyk	1–6, 3–6
Win	30–25	Aug 2019	ITF Almaty, Kazakhstan	25,000	Hard	(Kyrgyzstan) Ksenia Palkina	(Serbia) Tamara Čurović (Russia) Alina Silich	6–4, 7–6^{(3)}
Loss	30–26	Nov 2019	Shenzhen Longhua Open, China	100,000	Hard	(United Kingdom) Emily Webley-Smith	(Japan) Nao Hibino (Japan) Makoto Ninomiya	4–6, 0–6
Win	31–26	Dec 2020	ITF Antalya, Turkey	W15	Clay	(Ukraine) Valeriya Strakhova	(Germany) Julia Kimmelmann (Turkey) İlay Yörük	6–4, 6–4
Loss	31–27	Oct 2022	ITF Istanbul, Turkey	W25	Hard (i)	(Romania) Cristina Dinu	Ekaterina Yashina (Netherlands) Jasmijn Gimbrère	1–6, 6–3, [11–13]
Win	32–27	Nov 2022	ITF Jerusalem, Israel	W25	Hard	(Chinese Taipei) Lee Pei-chi	Ekaterina Reyngold; Polina Kudermetova	6–2, 6–4
Win	33–27	Oct 2023	ITF Qiandaohu, China	W25	Hard	Anastasiia Gureva	(China) Feng Shuo (China) Zheng Wushuang	6–2, 4–6, [10–4]
Loss	33–28	Nov 2023	ITF Solarino, Italy	W25	Carpet	(United Kingdom) Emily Webley-Smith	(Italy) Angelica Moratelli (Italy) Lisa Pigato	3–6, 4–6
Win	34–28	Aug 2024	Ladies Open Hechingen, Germany	W75	Clay	(Czech Republic) Michaela Bayerlová	(Germany) Anna Gabric (Germany) Mia Mack	6–2, 5–7, [10–6]
