= Dea Herdželaš =

Bosnian tennis player (born 1996)

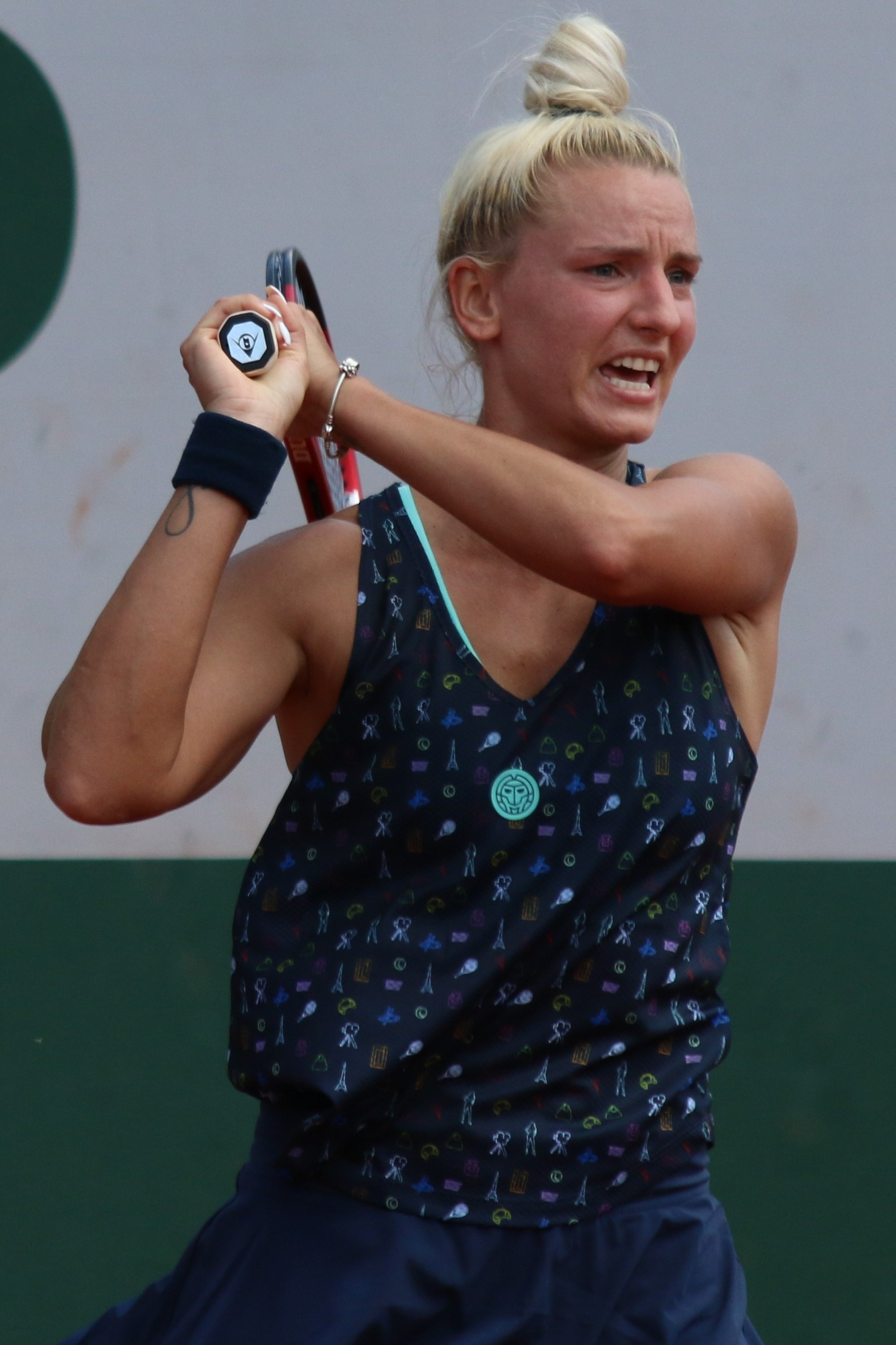
- Herdželaš at the 2022 French Open
- Country (sports): Bosnia and Herzegovina
- Born: 7 November 1996 (age 29) Sarajevo, Bosnia and Herzegovina
- Prize money: US$ 212,607

Singles
- Career record: 314–209
- Career titles: 9 ITF
- Highest ranking: No. 183 (23 May 2022)

Grand Slam singles results
- Australian Open: Q1 (2022)
- French Open: Q1 (2022)
- Wimbledon: Q1 (2022)
- US Open: Q1 (2022)

Doubles
- Career record: 153–116
- Career titles: 7 ITF
- Highest ranking: No. 334 (26 June 2023)

Team competitions
- Fed Cup: 22–25

Dea Herdželaš (born 7 November 1996) is a Bosnian former professional tennis player.

Herdželaš achieved a career-high singles ranking of world No. 183 on 23 May 2022, and reached a best doubles ranking of 334 in June 2023. As a junior, she had a best combined ranking of world No. 82, which she achieved on 21 January 2013.

Herdželaš made her debut for the Bosnia and Herzegovina Fed Cup team in February 2013, losing to Anne Keothavong of Great Britain.

Herdželaš won the 2012 Serbian national team championships with TK Partizan, winning each of her three singles matches.

Partnering Nefisa Berberović, she won the silver medal in the women's doubles at the 2018 Mediterranean Games, losing to Turkish pair Başak Eraydın and İpek Öz in the final which went to a deciding champions tiebreak.

Herdželaš has reached 19 career singles finals posting a record of nine wins. Additionally, she has reached 24 career doubles finals (7 titles). All of her finals both singles and doubles have come on the ITF Circuit.

== Grand Slam performance timeline ==
Key
W	F	SF	QF	#R	RR	Q#	DNQ	A	NH

(W) winner; (F) finalist; (SF) semifinalist; (QF) quarterfinalist; (#R) rounds 4, 3, 2, 1; (RR) round-robin stage; (Q#) qualification round; (DNQ) did not qualify; (A) absent; (NH) not held; (SR) strike rate (events won / competed); (W–L) win–loss record.
To avoid confusion and double counting, these charts are updated at the conclusion of a tournament or when the player's participation has ended.

== ITF Circuit finals ==
=== Singles: 19 (9 titles, 10 runner-ups) ===
Legend $25,000 tournaments $15,000 tournaments $10,000 tournaments	Finals by surface Hard (4–4) Clay (5–6)

Result	W–L	Date	Tournament	Tier	Surface	Opponent	Score
Loss	0–1	Jun 2014	ITF Niš, Serbia	10,000	Clay	(Greece) Maria Sakkari	6–3, 4–6, 1–6
Win	1–1	Sep 2014	ITF Belgrade, Serbia	10,000	Clay	(Croatia) Nina Alibalić	6–2, 6–2
Loss	1–2	Sep 2014	ITF Vrnjačka Banja, Serbia	10,000	Clay	(Greece) Valentini Grammatikopoulou	6–1, 3–6, 6–7^{(5)}
Win	2–2	Dec 2014	ITF Sousse, Tunisia	10,000	Hard	(Italy) Martina Caregaro	6–7^{(4)}, 6–2, 6–1
Loss	2–3	Apr 2015	ITF Cairo, Egypt	10,000	Clay	(Slovakia) Tereza Mihalíková	5–7, 3–6
Loss	2–4	Jul 2015	ITF Savitaipale, Finland	10,000	Clay	(Russia) Daria Mishina	4–6, 6–4, 4–6
Win	3–4	Aug 2015	ITF Tunis, Tunisia	10,000	Clay	(Bosnia and Herzegovina) Jelena Simić	3–6, 7–6^{(6)}, 6–3
Loss	3–5	Sep 2016	ITF Sharm El Sheikh, Egypt	10,000	Hard	(Russia) Anna Morgina	4–6, 0–6
Win	4–5	Oct 2016	ITF Sharm El Sheikh, Egypt	10,000	Hard	(Russia) Anna Morgina	6–1, 7–6^{(5)}
Win	5–5	Apr 2017	ITF Cairo, Egypt	15,000	Clay	(Romania) Irina Fetecău	6–3, 6–1
Loss	5–6	Jul 2018	ITF Setúbal, Portugal	25,000	Hard	(Switzerland) Ylena In-Albon	5–7, 2–6
Loss	5–7	May 2019	Khimki Cup, Russia	25,000	Hard	(Russia) Sofya Lansere	1–6, 6–4, 3–6
Loss	5–8	Jan 2020	ITF Stuttgart, Germany	15,000	Hard	(Bulgaria) Julia Terziyska	3–6, 4–6
Win	6–8	Feb 2021	ITF Antalya, Turkey	15,000	Clay	(Italy) Nuria Brancaccio	6–7^{(1)}, 6–2, 7–5
Win	7–8	May 2021	ITF Šibenik, Croatia	15,000	Clay	(Czech Republic) Darja Viďmanová	6–2, 3–6, 6–4
Win	8–8	Jun 2021	ITF Vilnius, Lithuania	15,000	Hard	(Russia) Anzhelika Isaeva	6–2, 4–0 ret.
Loss	8–9	Aug 2021	ITF Koksijde, Belgium	25,000	Clay	(Sweden) Mirjam Björklund	6–7^{(6)}, 3–6
Loss	8–10	Oct 2021	ITF Lima, Peru	25,000	Clay	(Czech Republic) Anna Sisková	6–3, 5–7, 0–6
Win	9–10	Oct 2021	ITF Lima, Peru	25,000	Clay	(Germany) Katharina Gerlach	6–2, 6–2

=== Doubles: 24 (7 titles, 17 runner-ups) ===
Legend $60,000 tournaments $25,000 tournaments $15,000 tournaments $10,000 tournaments	Finals by surface Hard (3–2) Clay (4–15)

Result	W–L	Date	Tournament	Tier	Surface	Partner	Opponents	Score
Loss	0–1	Sep 2013	ITF Budva, Montenegro	10,000	Clay	(Romania) Ana Bianca Mihăilă	(Croatia) Ema Mikulčić (Germany) Dejana Raickovic	2–6, 2–6
Win	1–1	Sep 2013	ITF Solin, Croatia	10,000	Clay	(Slovakia) Barbara Kötelešová	(Czech Republic) Gabriela Pantůčková (Czech Republic) Dominika Paterová	7–6^{(4)}, 6–3
Loss	1–2	Mar 2014	ITF Sharm El Sheikh, Egypt	10,000	Hard	(India) Natasha Palha	(Serbia) Nina Stojanović (Montenegro) Ana Veselinović	0–6, 6–4, [6–10]
Loss	1–3	May 2014	ITF Bastad, Sweden	10,000	Clay	(Switzerland) Conny Perrin	(Germany) Kim Grajdek (Greece) Maria Sakkari	5–7, 4–6
Win	2–3	Sep 2014	ITF Vrnjačka Banja, Serbia	10,000	Clay	(Serbia) Nina Stojanović	(Russia) Daria Lodikova (Ukraine) Kateryna Sliusar	6–3, 6–0
Loss	2–4	Nov 2014	ITF Sousse, Tunisia	10,000	Hard	(Bosnia and Herzegovina) Jelena Simić	(Russia) Natela Dzalamidze (Ukraine) Oleksandra Korashvili	3–6, 1–6
Loss	2–5	Jul 2015	ITF Bol, Croatia	10,000	Clay	(Slovakia) Barbara Kötelešová	(Hungary) Rebeka Stolmár (Hungary) Szabina Szlavikovics	6–7^{(5)}, 0–6
Loss	2–6	Jul 2015	ITF Tampere, Finland	10,000	Clay	(Romania) Cristina Ene	(Germany) Nora Niedmers (Belgium) Hélène Scholsen	4–6, 6–7^{(5)}
Win	3–6	Jul 2015	ITF Savitaipale, Finland	10,000	Clay	(Netherlands) Rosalie van der Hoek	(Germany) Nora Niedmers (Belgium) Hélène Scholsen	7–6^{(3)}, 7–5
Loss	3–7	Feb 2016	ITF Beinasco, Italy	25,000	Clay	(North Macedonia) Lina Gjorcheska	(Netherlands) Arantxa Rus (Turkey) İpek Soylu	4–6, 2–6
Loss	3–8	May 2017	ITF La Marsa, Tunisia	25,000	Clay	(Croatia) Tereza Mrdeža	(Poland) Katarzyna Kawa (Bosnia and Herzegovina) Jasmina Tinjić	5–7, 4–6
Loss	3–9	Jul 2017	Bursa Cup, Turkey	60,000	Clay	(Russia) Aleksandra Pospelova	(Russia) Valentyna Ivakhnenko (Ukraine) Anastasiya Vasylyeva	3–6, 7–5, [1–10]
Loss	3–10	Sep 2017	ITF Mamaia, Romania	15,000	Clay	(Romania) Oana Georgeta Simion	(Russia) Anastasiya Komardina (Romania) Elena-Gabriela Ruse	6–3, 1–6, [6–10]
Win	4–10	Dec 2017	ITF Indore, India	15,000	Hard	(Chinese Taipei) Hsu Ching-wen	(Uzbekistan) Albina Khabibulina (Kyrgyzstan) Ksenia Palkina	6–2, 6–1
Win	5–10	Feb 2018	ITF Antalya, Turkey	15,000	Hard	(Georgia (country)) Ekaterine Gorgodze	(Italy) Martina Caregaro (Italy) Federica di Sarra	6–2, 6–4
Win	6–10	Mar 2018	ITF Antalya, Turkey	15,000	Clay	(Hungary) Ágnes Bukta	(Russia) Amina Anshba (Ukraine) Anastasiya Vasylyeva	6–3, 6–3
Loss	6–11	Jun 2018	ITF Padova, Italy	25,000	Clay	(Croatia) Tereza Mrdeža	(Turkey) İpek Soylu (Czech Republic) Anastasia Zarycká	4–6, 1–6
Loss	6–12	Aug 2018	ITF Koksijde, Belgium	25,000	Clay	(Slovakia) Tereza Mihalíková	(Hungary) Anna Bondár (Romania) Raluca Șerban	3–6, 0–6
Loss	6–13	Jun 2019	ITF Bethany Beach, US	25,000	Clay	(Slovakia) Tereza Mihalíková	(United States) Usue Maitane Arconada (United States) Hayley Carter	4–6, 4–6
Loss	6–14	Jan 2021	ITF Cairo, Egypt	15,000	Clay	(Bosnia and Herzegovina) Anita Husarić	(Netherlands) Quirine Lemoine (Netherlands) Gabriella Mujan	6–4, 3–6, [6–10]
Loss	6–15	Oct 2021	ITF Guayaquil, Ecuador	25,000	Clay	(Mexico) Victoria Rodríguez	(Colombia) María Herazo González (Colombia) María Paulina Pérez	3–6, 6–4, [7–10]
Loss	6–16	Nov 2022	ITF Heraklion, Greece	25,000	Clay	(North Macedonia) Lina Gjorcheska	(Romania) Oana Gavrilă (Bulgaria) Lia Karatancheva	4–6, 4–6
Win	7–16	Mar 2023	ITF Bangalore, India	25,000	Hard	(United Kingdom) Eden Silva	(Portugal) Francisca Jorge (Portugal) Matilde Jorge	3–6, 6–4, [10–7]
Loss	7–17	Apr 2023	ITF Pula, Italy	25,000	Clay	(Belgium) Marie Benoît	(Italy) Alessandra Teodosescu (Italy) Federica Urgesi	4–6, 3–6

== National representation ==
=== Fed Cup/Billie Jean King Cup ===
Herdželaš made her Fed Cup debut for Bosnia and Herzegovina in 2013, while the team was competing in the Europe/Africa Zone Group I, when she was 16 years and 92 days old.

Group membership World Group (0–0) World Group Play-off World Group II (0–0) World Group II Play-off Europe/Africa Group (14–20)	Matches by surface Hard (4–14) Clay (10–6)	Matches by type Singles (9–14) Doubles (5–6)	Matches by setting Indoors (4–10) Outdoors (10–10)

==== Singles (9–14) ====
Edition	Stage	Date	Location	Against	Surface	Opponent	W/L	Score
2013	Z1 RR	Feb 2013	Eilat (ISR)	(United Kingdom) Great Britain	Hard	Anne Keothavong	L	4–6, 2–6
2013	Z1 RR	Feb 2013	Eilat (ISR)	Hungary	Hard	Gréta Arn	L	3–6, 2–6
2014	Z2 RR	Apr 2014	Šiauliai (LTU)	Egypt	Hard (i)	Sandra Samir	L	6–4, 4–6, 2–6
2014	Z2 PO	Apr 2014	Šiauliai (LTU)	Liechtenstein	Hard (i)	Kathinka von Deichmann	L	5–7, 4–6
2016	Z2 RR	Apr 2016	Cairo (EGY)	Liechtenstein	Clay	Stephanie Vogt	W	7–5, 2–6, 6–4
2016	Z2 RR	Apr 2016	Cairo (EGY)	Egypt	Clay	Sandra Samir	W	6–3, 6–4
2016	Z2 RR	Apr 2016	Cairo (EGY)	Austria	Clay	Barbara Haas	L	5–7, 1–6
2016	Z2 PO	Apr 2016	Cairo (EGY)	Denmark	Clay	Karen Barritza	W	6–0, 6–3
2017	Z1 RR	Feb 2017	Tallinn (EST)	Hungary	Hard (i)	Tímea Babos	L	4–6, 1–6
2017	Z1 RR	Feb 2017	Tallinn (EST)	Croatia	Hard (i)	Ana Konjuh	L	0–6, 2–6
2017	Z1 PO	Feb 2017	Tallinn (EST)	Portugal	Hard (i)	Michelle Larcher de Brito	L	1–6, 2–6
2018	Z2 RR	Apr 2018	Athens (GRE)	Luxembourg	Clay	Mandy Minella	L	7–5, 5–7, 1–6
2018	Z2 RR	Apr 2018	Athens (GRE)	Israel	Clay	Julia Glushko	L	6–4, 2–6, 0–6
2018	Z2 RR	Apr 2018	Athens (GRE)	Norway	Clay	Malene Helgø	W	6–4, 6–2
2018	Z2 PO	Apr 2018	Athens (GRE)	Egypt	Clay	Sandra Samir	L	0–2 ret.
2019	Z2 RR	Feb 2019	Esch-sur-Alzette (LUX)	Tunisia	Hard (i)	Ons Jabeur	L	0–6, 4–6
2020–21	Z3 RR	Jun 2021	Vilnius (LTU)	Rwanda	Hard (i)	Joselyn Umulisa	W	6–1, 6–0
2020–21	Z3 RR	Jun 2021	Vilnius (LTU)	Cyprus	Hard (i)	Raluca Șerban	L	4–6, 7–5, 3–6
2020–21	Z3 PO	Jun 2021	Vilnius (LTU)	(Republic of Ireland) Ireland	Hard (i)	Anna Bowtell	W	6–3, 6–4
2020–21	Z3 PO	Jun 2021	Vilnius (LTU)	Norway	Hard (i)	Ulrikke Eikeri	L	5–7, 3–6
2022	Z3 RR	Jun 2022	Ulcinj (MNE)	Nigeria	Clay	Adesuwa Osabuohien	W	6–0, 6–2
2022	Z3 RR	Jun 2022	Ulcinj (MNE)	Montenegro	Clay	Iva Lakić	W	6–0, 6–2
2022	Z3 PO	Jun 2022	Ulcinj (MNE)	Morocco	Clay	Aya El Aouni	W	6–2, 6–4

==== Doubles (5–6) ====
Edition	Stage	Date	Location	Against	Surface	Partner	Opponents	W/L	Score
2013	Z1 RR	Feb 2013	Eilat (ISR)	Hungary	Hard	Anita Husarić	Tímea Babos; Katalin Marosi	L	5–7, 4–6
2013	Z1 RR	Feb 2013	Eilat (ISR)	Portugal	Hard	Anita Husarić	Michelle Larcher de Brito; Bárbara Luz	L	1–6, 0–6
2014	Z2 RR	Apr 2014	Šiauliai (LTU)	South Africa	Hard (i)	Jasmina Tinjić	Natalie Grandin; Chanel Simmonds	W	3–6, 7–6^{(7–3)}, 6–4
2016	Z2 RR	Apr 2016	Cairo (EGY)	Egypt	Clay	Ema Burgić Bucko	Dona Abo Habaga; Laila Elnimr	W	6–3, 7–5
2016	Z2 RR	Apr 2016	Cairo (EGY)	Austria	Clay	Anita Husarić	Barbara Haas; Sandra Klemenschits	L	1–6, 3–6
2016	Z2 PO	Apr 2016	Cairo (EGY)	Denmark	Clay	Ema Burgić Bucko	Karen Barritza; Emilie Francati	W	6–4, 6–3
2017	Z1 RR	Feb 2017	Tallinn (EST)	Hungary	Hard (i)	Anita Husarić	Ágnes Bukta; Fanni Stollár	L	4–6, 3–6
2017	Z1 RR	Feb 2017	Tallinn (EST)	Croatia	Hard (i)	Anita Husarić	Darija Jurak; Tena Lukas	L	6–7^{(6–8)}, 2–6
2018	Z2 RR	Apr 2018	Athens (GRE)	Luxembourg	Clay	Anita Husarić	Mandy Minella; Eléonora Molinaro	L	5–7, 3–6
2018	Z2 RR	Apr 2018	Athens (GRE)	Norway	Clay	Jelena Simić	Astrid Wanja Brune Olsen; Malene Helgø	W	6–0, 6–2
2020–21	Z3 RR	Jun 2021	Vilnius (LTU)	Cyprus	Hard (i)	Nefisa Berberović	Eleni Louka; Raluca Șerban	W	6–3, 6–2

=== Mediterranean Games ===
==== Doubles: 1 (runner-up) ====
Result	Date	Location	Surface	Partner	Opponents	Score
Loss	Jun 2018	Tarragona, Spain	Clay	(Bosnia and Herzegovina) Nefisa Berberović	(Turkey) Başak Eraydın (Turkey) İpek Öz	6–0, 3–6, [10–12]
