= Anastasiya Vasylyeva =

Ukrainian tennis player

Anastasiya Vasylyeva Анастасія Васильєва
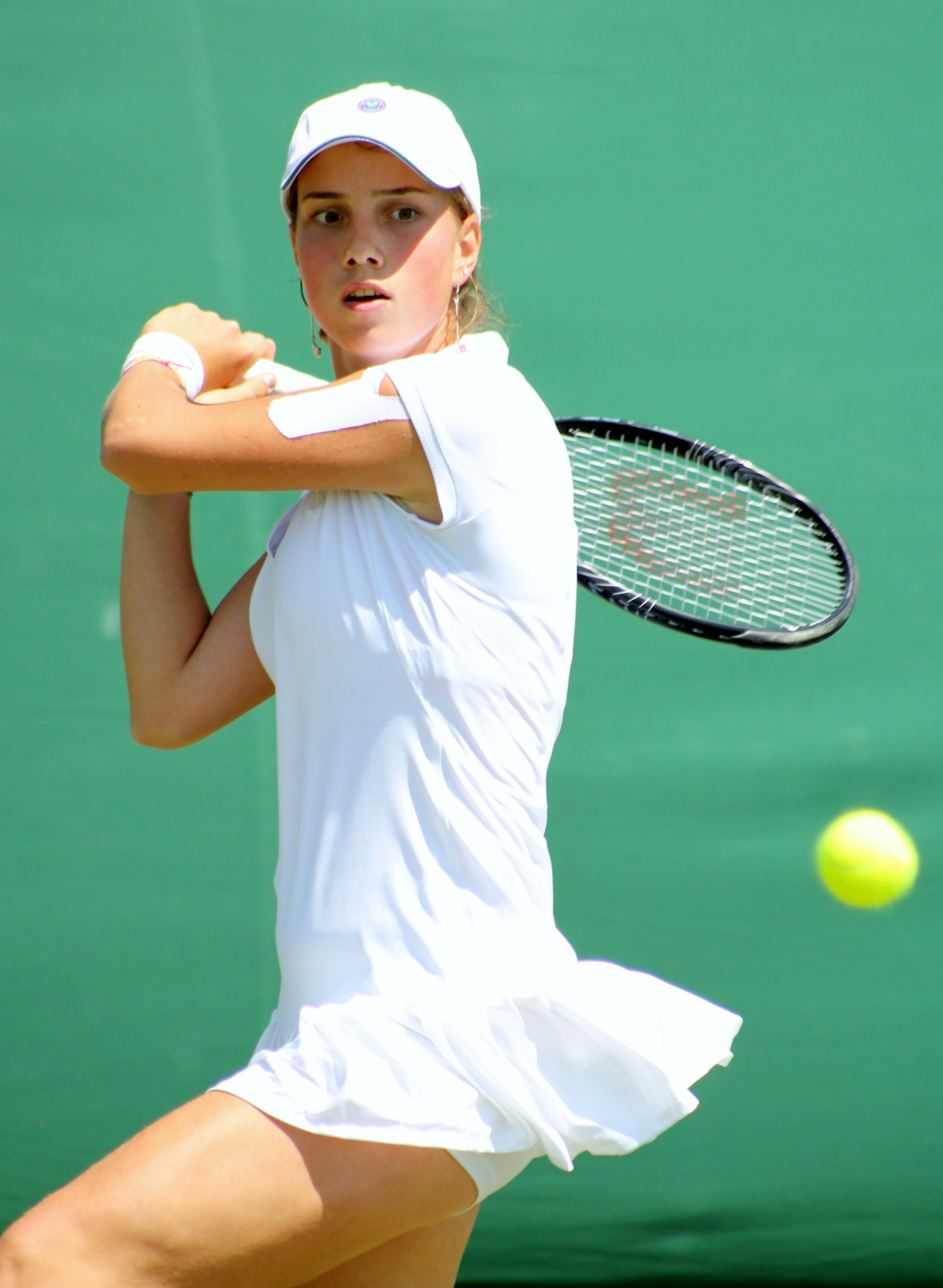
- Vasylyeva at Wimbledon, 2014
- Country (sports): Ukraine
- Born: 18 January 1992 (age 34) Kharkiv, Ukraine
- Height: 1.82 m (6 ft 0 in)
- Plays: Left (two-handed backhand)
- Prize money: $239,775

Singles
- Career record: 367–271
- Career titles: 9 ITF
- Highest ranking: No. 129 (11 August 2014)

Grand Slam singles results
- Australian Open: Q2 (2014)
- French Open: Q2 (2014)
- Wimbledon: Q1 (2014)
- US Open: Q1 (2014)

Doubles
- Career record: 310–196
- Career titles: 28 ITF
- Highest ranking: No. 145 (19 October 2015)

Team competitions
- Fed Cup: 1–0

Anastasiya Yuriyivna Vasylyeva (Ukrainian: Анастасія Юріївна Васильєва; born 18 January 1992) is a Ukrainian former professional tennis player.

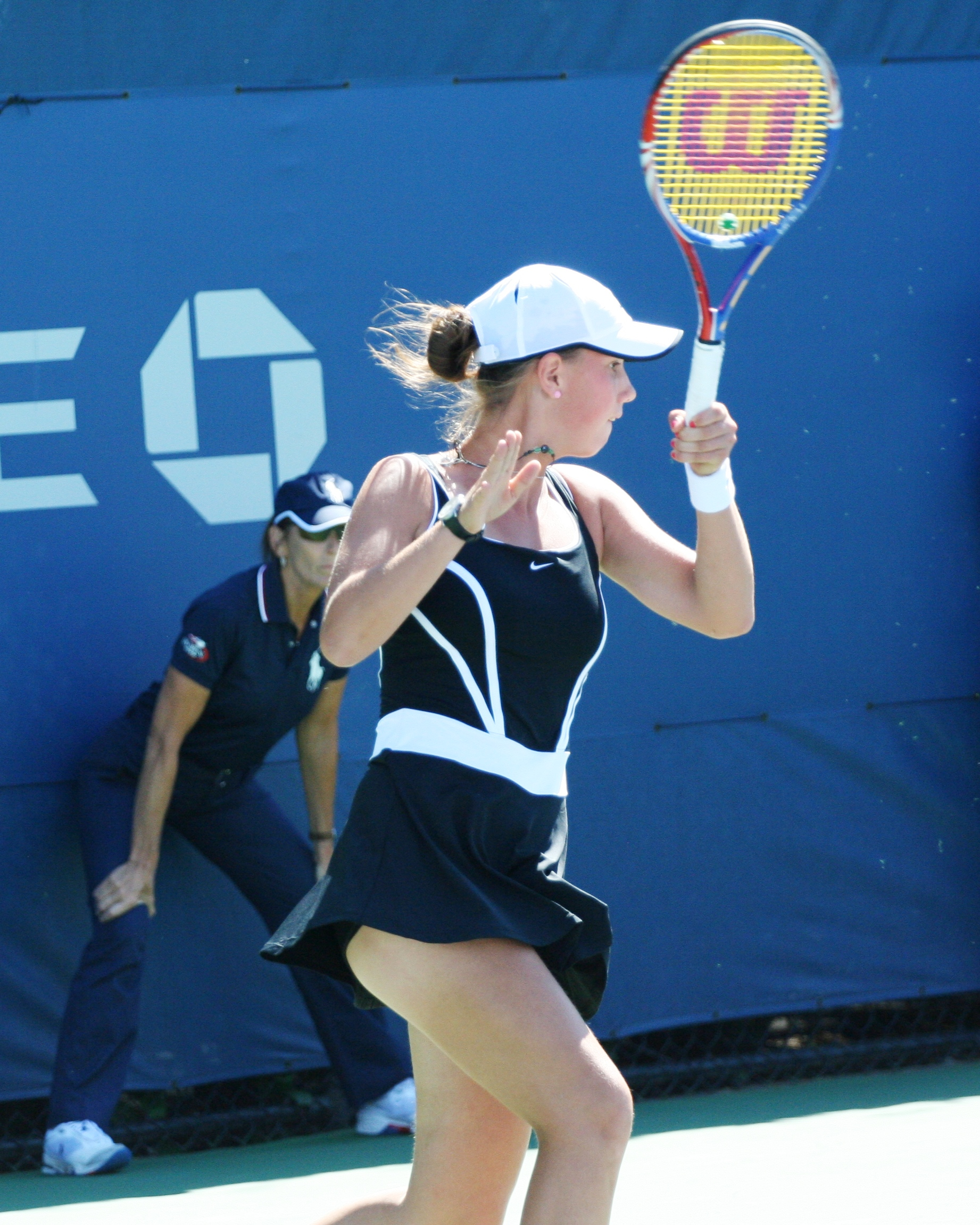
Anastasiya Vasylyeva, 2010

In her career, she won nine singles and 28 doubles titles on the ITF Circuit. Her highest WTA rankings are 129 in singles, achieved August 2014, and No. 145 in doubles, which she reached in October 2015.

Vasylyeva played only one match for the Ukraine Fed Cup team, partnering Olga Savchuk. In February 2016, they defeated Swedish pair of Cornelia Lister and Jacqueline Cabaj Awad, in straight sets.

== ITF Circuit finals ==
=== Singles: 24 (9 titles, 15 runner-ups) ===
Legend $25,000 tournaments $15,000 tournaments $10,000 tournaments	Finals by surface Hard (4–4) Clay (4–10) Carpet (1–1)

Result	No.	Date	Tournament	Surface	Opponent	Score
Loss	1.	1 June 2008	ITF Kharkiv, Ukraine	Clay	(Russia) Elena Kulikova	4–6, 6–7^{(5)}
Loss	2.	30 May 2009	ITF Kharkiv, Ukraine	Clay	(Russia) Daria Kuchmina	6–2, 3–6, 6–7^{(11)}
Win	1.	5 November 2010	ITF Minsk, Belarus	Carpet (i)	(Russia) Eugeniya Pashkova	6–4, 4–6, 6–3
Win	2.	4 December 2010	ITF Mandya, India	Hard	(Thailand) Luksika Kumkhum	6–2, 3–6, 6–2
Loss	3.	4 March 2012	ITF Bron, France	Hard (i)	(Ukraine) Maryna Zanevska	7–5, 6–7^{(2)}, 3–6
Win	3.	24 March 2012	ITF Almaty, Kazakhstan	Hard (i)	(Slovakia) Michaela Hončová	6–4, 6–1
Loss	4.	30 September 2012	ITF Varna, Bulgaria	Clay	(Bulgaria) Viktoriya Tomova	1–6, 4–6
Loss	5.	15 December 2012	ITF Antalya, Turkey	Clay	(Russia) Victoria Kan	3–6, 5–7
Loss	6.	29 December 2012	ITF St. Petersburg, Russia	Carpet (i)	(Russia) Regina Kulikova	0–6, 7–5, 4–6
Win	4.	27 April 2013	ITF Andijan, Uzbekistan	Hard	(Georgia (country)) Oksana Kalashnikova	6–4, 7–5
Loss	7.	22 June 2013	ITF Cologne, Germany	Clay	(Germany) Antonia Lottner	6–4, 4–6, 5–7
Win	5.	10 August 2013	ITF Moscow, Russia	Clay	(Russia) Daria Mironova	6–2, 6–3
Win	6.	7 September 2013	ITF Moscow, Russia	Clay	(Russia) Evgeniya Rodina	6–2, 6–1
Loss	8.	29 September 2013	Fergana Challenger, Uzbekistan	Hard	(Uzbekistan) Nigina Abduraimova	6–2, 1–6, 6–7^{(4)}
Loss	9.	16 November 2013	ITF Minsk, Belarus	Hard (i)	(Russia) Margarita Gasparyan	4–6, 4–6
Loss	10.	9 February 2014	Open de l'Isère, France	Hard (i)	(France) Pauline Parmentier	6–2, 0–6, 4–6
Loss	11.	1 March 2014	ITF Beinasco, Italy	Clay (i)	(Italy) Anastasia Grymalska	6–7^{(5)}, 3–6
Win	7.	31 May 2014	ITF Moscow, Russia	Clay	(Russia) Vitalia Diatchenko	7–5, 6–4
Loss	12.	3 August 2014	ITF Plzeň, Czech Republic	Clay	(Czech Republic) Denisa Allertová	1–6, 1–6
Win	8.	12 December 2015	ITF Indore, India	Hard	(India) Karman Thandi	7–5, 2–6, 6–2
Loss	13.	13 March 2016	ITF Antalya, Turkey	Clay	(Germany) Anne Schäfer	3–6, 3–6
Win	9.	15 January 2017	ITF Antalya, Turkey	Clay	(Germany) Tayisiya Morderger	7–5, 6–3
Loss	14.	22 January 2017	ITF Antalya, Turkey	Clay	(Russia) Aleksandra Pospelova	4–6, 6–1, 4–6
Loss	15.	18 June 2017	ITF Padova, Italy	Clay	(Sweden) Rebecca Peterson	7–5, 1–6, 4–6

=== Doubles: 53 (28 titles, 25 runner-ups) ===
Legend $50/60,000 tournaments $25,000 tournaments $15,000 tournaments $10,000 tournaments	Finals by surface Hard (13–10) Clay (12–13) Carpet (3–2)

Result	No.	Date	Tournament	Surface	Partner	Opponents	Score
Loss	1.	14 October 2007	ITF Volos, Greece	Carpet	(Poland) Justyna Jegiołka	(Poland) Olga Brózda (Poland) Magdalena Kiszczyńska	3–6, 6–7
Loss	2.	18 July 2009	ITF Bucha, Ukraine	Clay	(Russia) Eugeniya Pashkova	(Ukraine) Irina Buryachok (Ukraine) Oksana Uzhylovska	4–6, 4–6
Win	1.	20 November 2009	ITF Pune, India	Hard	(Italy) Nicole Clerico	(Russia) Nina Bratchikova (Kyrgyzstan) Ksenia Palkina	4–6, 6–3, [13–11]
Win	2.	12 Jun 2010	ITF Campobasso, Italy	Clay	(Ukraine) Yuliana Fedak	(Argentina) María Irigoyen (France) Laura Thorpe	2–6, 6–3, [10–6]
Loss	3.	6 August 2010	ITF Astana, Kazakhstan	Hard	(Ukraine) Yuliana Fedak	(Russia) Nina Bratchikova (Russia) Ekaterina Lopes	4–6, 4–6
Win	3.	16 October 2010	ITF Kharkiv, Ukraine	Carpet (i)	(Ukraine) Ganna Piven	(Russia) Marina Shamayko (Romania) Mihaela Buzărnescu	6–4, 6–4
Loss	4.	14 May 2011	ITF İstanbul, Turkey	Hard	(Ukraine) Ganna Piven	(Bulgaria) Dessislava Mladenova (Italy) Andreea Vaideanu	6–4, 1–6, [5–10]
Win	4.	15 October 2011	ITF Yerevan, Armenia	Clay	(Italy) Anastasia Grymalska	(Armenia) Ani Amiraghyan (Georgia (country)) Tatia Mikadze	6–3, 6–3
Win	5.	16 March 2012	ITF Astana, Kazakhstan	Hard (i)	(Russia) Eugeniya Pashkova	(Uzbekistan) Albina Khabibulina (Belarus) Ilona Kremen	7–5, 6–2
Win	6.	28 April 2012	ITF Andijan, Uzbekistan	Hard	(Uzbekistan) Albina Khabibulina	(Uzbekistan) Sabina Sharipova (Russia) Ekaterina Yashina	6–0, 6–2
Win	7.	5 May 2012	ITF Shymkent, Kazakhstan	Hard	(Uzbekistan) Albina Khabibulina	(Russia) Maya Gaverova (Kyrgyzstan) Ksenia Palkina	3–6, 6–1, [10–6]
Loss	5.	12 May 2012	ITF Almaty, Kazakhstan	Hard	(Uzbekistan) Albina Khabibulina	(Uzbekistan) Sabina Sharipova (Russia) Ekaterina Yashina	4–6, 6–3, [3–10]
Loss	6.	19 May 2012	Fergana Challenger, Uzbekistan	Hard	(Uzbekistan) Albina Khabibulina	(Ukraine) Lyudmyla Kichenok (Ukraine) Nadiia Kichenok	4–6, 1–6
Loss	7.	2 June 2012	ITF Qarshi, Uzbekistan	Hard	(Uzbekistan) Albina Khabibulina	(Belarus) Darya Lebesheva (Russia) Ekaterina Yashina	6–7^{(5)}, 2–6
Loss	8.	3 August 2012	ITF Moscow, Russia	Clay	(Russia) Eugeniya Pashkova	(Australia) Arina Rodionova (Russia) Valeriya Solovyeva	3–6, 3–6
Win	8.	29 September 2012	ITF Varna, Bulgaria	Clay	(Belgium) Michaela Boev	(Bulgaria) Borislava Botusharova (Bulgaria) Viktoriya Tomova	6–1, 7–5
Win	9.	1 December 2012	ITF Antalya, Turkey	Clay	(Russia) Eugeniya Pashkova	(Romania) Laura-Ioana Andrei (Austria) Janina Toljan	4–6, 6–3, [10–2]
Loss	9.	28 December 2012	ITF St. Petersburg, Russia	Carpet (i)	(Russia) Yuliya Kalabina	(Russia) Alexandra Artamonova (Belarus) Ekaterina Dzehalevich	0–6, 2–6
Win	10.	19 April 2013	ITF Namangan, Uzbekistan	Hard	(Uzbekistan) Albina Khabibulina	(Russia) Valentyna Ivakhnenko (Kyrgyzstan) Ksenia Palkina	6–3, 6–3
Win	11.	27 April 2013	ITF Andijan, Uzbekistan	Hard	(Uzbekistan) Albina Khabibulina	(Russia) Polina Monova (Russia) Ekaterina Yashina	7–5, 6–4
Win	12.	4 May 2013	ITF Shymkent, Kazakhstan	Clay	(Uzbekistan) Albina Khabibulina	(Russia) Polina Monova (Russia) Anna Smolina	2–6, 6–4, [11–9]
Loss	10.	1 June 2013	ITF Moscow, Russia	Clay	(Russia) Eugeniya Pashkova	(Russia) Ksenia Kirillova (Russia) Polina Monova	6–1, 4–6, [4–10]
Win	13.	15 June 2013	Bredeney Ladies Open, Germany	Clay	(Russia) Eugeniya Pashkova	(France) Irina Ramialison (France) Constance Sibille	7–5, 6–4
Win	14.	22 June 2013	ITF Cologne, Germany	Clay	(Russia) Eugeniya Pashkova	(Serbia) Tamara Čurović (Germany) Antonia Lottner	6–3, 5–7, [10–6]
Loss	11.	6 July 2013	ITF Brussels, Belgium	Clay	(Belgium) Michaela Boev	(Germany) Anna Klasen (Germany) Charlotte Klasen	1–6, 3–6
Loss	12.	10 August 2013	ITF Moscow, Russia	Hard	(Uzbekistan) Albina Khabibulina	(Ukraine) Alona Fomina (Ukraine) Anna Shkudun	2–6, 5–7
Win	15.	26 October 2013	ITF Herzliya, Israel	Hard	(Ukraine) Yuliya Beygelzimer	(Turkey) Başak Eraydın (Turkey) Melis Sezer	6–3, 6–3
Loss	13.	1 November 2013	ITF İstanbul, Turkey	Hard (i)	(Georgia (country)) Sofia Shapatava	(Turkey) Çağla Büyükakçay (Turkey) Pemra Özgen	3–6, 2–6
Win	16.	23 November 2013	ITF Bucha, Ukraine	Carpet (i)	(Georgia (country)) Sofia Shapatava	(Ukraine) Anhelina Kalinina (Russia) Elizaveta Kulichkova	7–6^{(4)}, 6–2
Win	17.	8 February 2014	Open de l'Isère, France	Carpet (i)	(Georgia (country)) Sofia Shapatava	(Ukraine) Kateryna Kozlova (Russia) Margarita Gasparyan	6–1, 6–4
Win	18.	18 April 2014	ITF Qarshi, Uzbekistan	Hard	(Uzbekistan) Albina Khabibulina	(Russia) Ekaterina Bychkova (Russia) Veronika Kudermetova	2–6, 7–5, [10–4]
Loss	14.	26 July 2014	ITF Sobota, Poland	Clay	(Ukraine) Maryna Zanevska	(Czech Republic) Barbora Krejčíková (Serbia) Aleksandra Krunić	6–3, 0–6, [6–10]
Loss	15.	2 August 2014	ITF Plzeň, Czech Republic	Clay	(Belarus) Lidziya Marozava	(Austria) Sandra Klemenschits (Czech Republic) Renata Voráčová	4–6, 5–7
Loss	16.	26 December 2014	ITF Pune, India	Hard	(Georgia (country)) Oksana Kalashnikova	(Russia) Anna Morgina (Serbia) Nina Stojanović	6–7^{(7)}, 4–6
Win	19.	21 February 2015	ITF Moscow, Russia	Hard (i)	(Belarus) Lidziya Marozava	(Russia) Natela Dzalamidze (Russia) Veronika Kudermetova	6–4, 6–4
Loss	17.	16 May 2015	ITF La Marsa, Tunisia	Clay	(Georgia (country)) Sofia Shapatava	(Turkey) Pemra Özgen (Turkey) İpek Soylu	6–3, 3–6, [4–10]
Loss	18.	19 June 2015	ITF Minsk, Belarus	Clay	(Turkey) Pemra Özgen	(Russia) Valentyna Ivakhnenko (Russia) Irina Khromacheva	3–6, 0–6
Loss	19.	26 June 2015	ITF Moscow, Russia	Clay	(Ukraine) Alona Fomina	(Russia) Irina Khromacheva (Russia) Polina Leykina	5–7, 5–7
Loss	20.	10 July 2015	Bursa Cup, Turkey	Clay	(Georgia (country)) Sofia Shapatava	(Russia) Marina Melnikova (Spain) Laura Pous Tió	4–6, 4–6
Win	20.	16 August 2015	Ladies Open Hechingen, Germany	Clay	(Venezuela) Andrea Gámiz	(Germany) Vivian Heisen (Philippines) Katharina Lehnert	4–6, 7–6^{(4)}, [10–3]
Win	21.	11 September 2015	Sofia Cup, Bulgaria	Clay	(Georgia (country)) Sofia Shapatava	(Bulgaria) Elitsa Kostova (Czech Republic) Kateřina Kramperová	6–2, 6–2
Win	22.	18 September 2015	ITF Dobrich, Bulgaria	Clay	(Georgia (country)) Sofia Shapatava	(Bulgaria) Elitsa Kostova (Czech Republic) Kateřina Kramperová	6–2, 6–0
Loss	21.	25 September 2015	ITF Bucha, Ukraine	Clay	(Ukraine) Olga Ianchuk	(Georgia (country)) Ekaterine Gorgodze (Georgia (country)) Sofia Shapatava	5–7, 2–6
Win	23.	11 December 2015	ITF Indore, India	Hard	(Ukraine) Veronika Kapshay	(India) Dhruthi Tatachar Venugopal (India) Karman Thandi	6–1, 6–3
Win	24.	25 December 2015	ITF Pune, India	Hard	(Russia) Valentyna Ivakhnenko	(Chinese Taipei) Hsu Chieh-yu (India) Prarthana Thombare	4–6, 6–2, [12–10]
Win	25.	19 March 2016	ITF Antalya, Turkey	Hard	(Russia) Olga Doroshina	(Czech Republic) Natálie Novotná (Czech Republic) Markéta Vondroušová	6–2, 6–1
Loss	22.	2 April 2016	ITF Antalya, Turkey	Hard	(Bulgaria) Viktoriya Tomova	(Turkey) Ayla Aksu (Turkey) Melis Sezer	3–6, 3–6
Win	26.	27 May 2016	ITF Andijan, Uzbekistan	Hard	(Czech Republic) Barbora Štefková	(Russia) Victoria Kan (Uzbekistan) Sabina Sharipova	6–3, 4–6, [10–7]
Win	27.	21 July 2017	Bursa Cup, Turkey	Clay	(Russia) Valentyna Ivakhnenko	(Bosnia and Herzegovina) Dea Herdželaš (Russia) Aleksandra Pospelova	6–3, 5–7, [10–1]
Win	28.	14 January 2018	ITF Antalya, Turkey	Clay	(Georgia (country)) Sofia Shapatava	(Turkey) İpek Öz (Kyrgyzstan) Ksenia Palkina	5–7, 6–0, [13–11]
Loss	23.	3 March 2018	ITF Antalya, Turkey	Clay	(Russia) Amina Anshba	(Hungary) Ágnes Bukta (Bosnia and Herzegovina) Dea Herdželaš	3–6, 3–6
Loss	24.	25 March 2018	ITF Pula, Italy	Clay	(Georgia (country)) Sofia Shapatava	(Slovakia) Chantal Škamlová (Netherlands) Eva Wacanno	1–6, 7–5, [6–10]
Loss	25.	20 October 2018	ITF Antalya, Turkey	Hard	(Ukraine) Polina Gubina	(Czech Republic) Johana Marková (Czech Republic) Magdalena Pantucková	1–6, 0–6
