= İpek Soylu =

Turkish tennis player (born 1996)

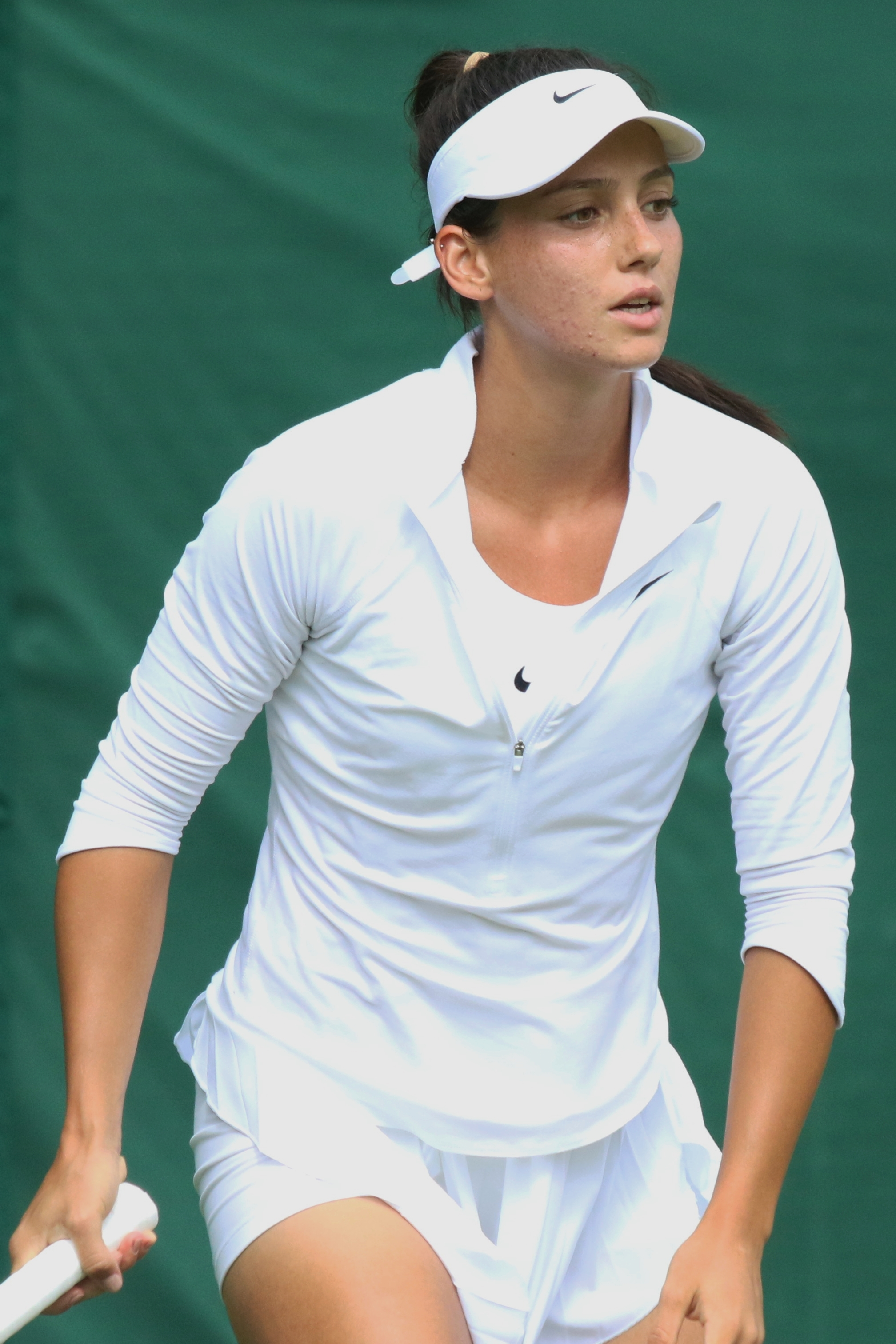
- Soylu at the 2016 Wimbledon
- Country (sports): Turkey
- Residence: Istanbul, Turkey
- Born: 15 April 1996 (age 30) Adana, Turkey
- Height: 1.74 m (5 ft 9 in)
- Retired: September 2022
- Plays: Right (two-handed backhand)
- Coach: Erhan Oral
- Prize money: $399,180

Singles
- Career record: 245–165
- Career titles: 0 WTA, 12 ITF
- Highest ranking: No. 151 (31 October 2016)

Grand Slam singles results
- Australian Open: Q1 (2016, 2017, 2018)
- French Open: 1R (2016)
- Wimbledon: Q2 (2017)
- US Open: 1R (2017)

Doubles
- Career record: 166–90
- Career titles: 3 WTA, 18 ITF
- Highest ranking: No. 63 (17 April 2017)

Grand Slam doubles results
- Australian Open: 1R (2017)
- French Open: 1R (2017)
- Wimbledon: 2R (2017)

Team competitions
- Fed Cup: 13–10

İpek Soylu (born 15 April 1996) is a Turkish former tennis player. On 31 October 2016, she reached her best singles ranking of world No. 151. On 17 April 2017, she peaked at No. 63 in the WTA doubles rankings. She won a major junior title in 2014 with Jil Teichmann in doubles at the US Open.

In her career, Soylu won three doubles titles on the WTA Tour, her biggest coming at the 2016 year-end Elite Trophy. She also won 12 singles and 18 doubles titles on the ITF Circuit.

Playing for Turkey Fed Cup team, Soylu has accumulated a win–loss record of 13–10. She has been a member of the Enkaspor tennis team.

Soylu announced her retirement from professional tennis September 2022.

== Personal life and background ==
Soylu was born on 15 April 1996 in Istanbul and began playing tennis at the age of six. Her favorite shot is forehand, while her favourite surface is clay. Her favorite players were Roger Federer and Li Na.

== Career ==
=== 2016: Elite Trophy doubles title ===
In 2016, Soylu won her first three WTA Tour titles, all in the doubles discipline, the biggest coming at the Elite Trophy in Zhuhai where she partnered with Xu Yifan. That year, she also won two other titles, one on home soil at the İstanbul Cup, and the other at the Tashkent Open, partnering with Andreea Mitu and Raluca Olaru, respectively.

That same year, she also made her major main-draw debut, after qualifying for the French Open. She drew wildcard Virginie Razzano in the first round and lost to the French veteran, in three sets.

=== 2017 ===
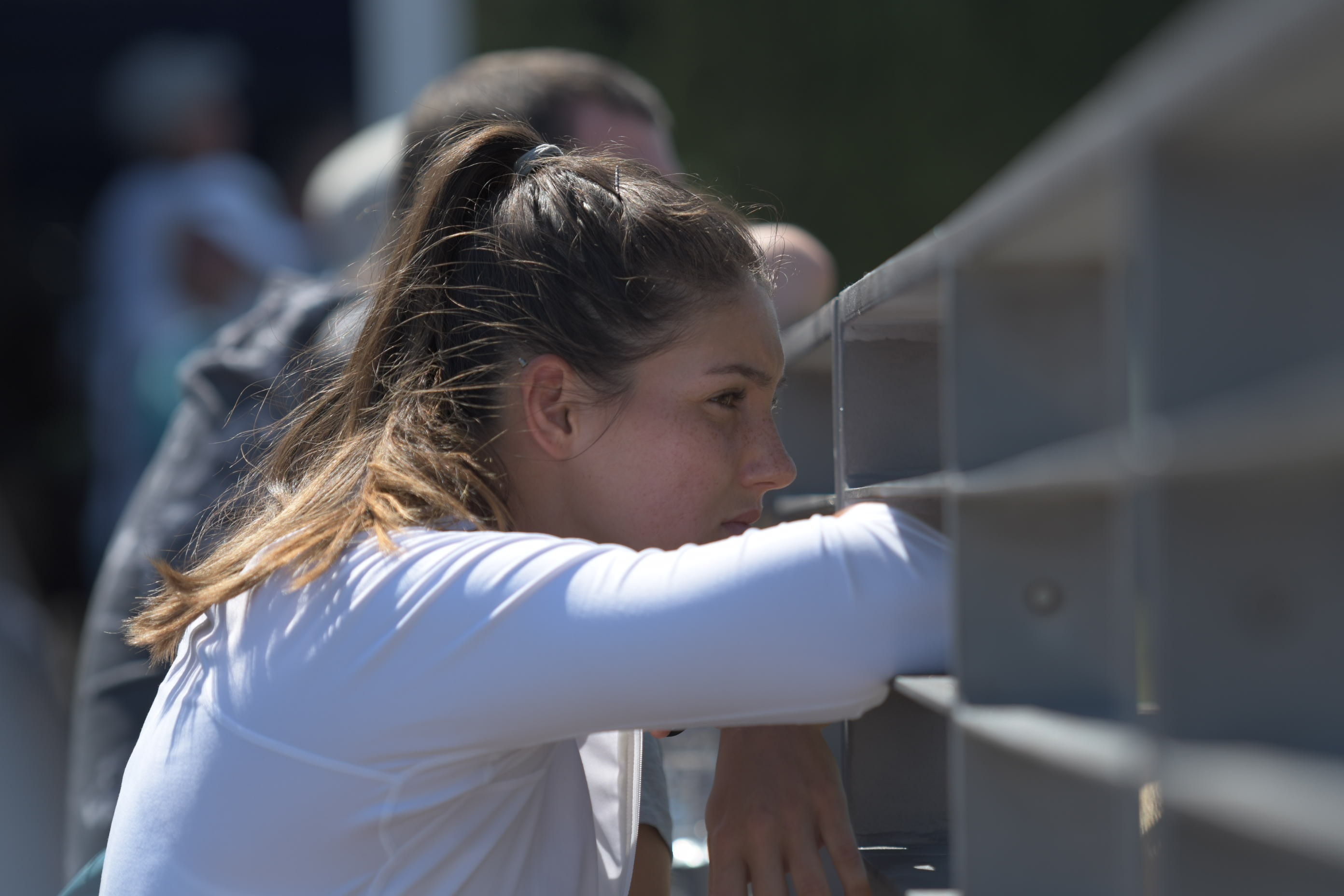
Soylu at the 2017 Birmingham Classic

At Wimbledon, Soylu made her first match win at a Grand Slam championship, reaching the second round together with Varatchaya Wongteanchai in which they lost to Chan Hao-ching/Monica Niculescu. In August at the US Open, Soylu lost in the first round to Carla Suárez Navarro.

== Significant finals ==
=== Elite Trophy ===
==== Doubles: 1 (title) ====
Result	Year	Location	Surface	Partner	Opponents	Score
Win	2016	Zhuhai, China	Hard (i)	(China) Xu Yifan	(China) Yang Zhaoxuan (China) You Xiaodi	6–4, 3–6, [10–7]

== WTA Tour finals ==
=== Doubles: 3 (3 titles) ===
Legend Elite Trophy (1–0) International (2–0)	Finals by surface Hard (2–0) Clay (1–0)

Result	W–L	Date	Tournament	Tier	Surface	Partner	Opponents	Score
Win	1–0	Apr 2016	İstanbul Cup, Turkey	International	Clay	(Romania) Andreea Mitu	(Switzerland) Xenia Knoll (Montenegro) Danka Kovinić	w/o
Win	2–0	Sep 2016	Tashkent Open, Uzbekistan	International	Hard	(Romania) Raluca Olaru	(Netherlands) Demi Schuurs (Czech Republic) Renata Voráčová	7–5, 6–3
Win	3–0	Oct 2016	Elite Trophy Zhuhai, China	Elite	Hard (i)	(China) Xu Yifan	(China) Yang Zhaoxuan (China) You Xiaodi	6–4, 3–6, [10–7]

== WTA 125 finals ==
=== Doubles: 1 (runner-up) ===
Result	Date	Tournament	Surface	Partner	Opponents	Score
Loss	May 2016	Bol Open, Croatia	Clay	(Romania) Raluca Olaru	(Switzerland) Xenia Knoll (Croatia) Petra Martić	3–6, 2–6

== ITF Circuit finals ==
Legend
$75,000 tournaments
$50/60,000 tournaments
$25,000 tournaments
$10/15,000 tournaments

=== Singles: 21 (12 titles, 9 runner-ups) ===
Result	W–L	Date	Tournament	Tier	Surface	Opponent	Score
Loss	0–1	Dec 2012	ITF İstanbul, Turkey	10k	Hard (i)	(Bulgaria) Isabella Shinikova	4–6, 2–6
Win	1–1	May 2013	ITF Sharm El Sheikh, Egypt	10k	Hard	(Italy) Camilla Rosatello	7–5, 6–1
Win	2–1	Aug 2013	ITF İzmir, Turkey	10k	Hard	(Netherlands) Gabriela van de Graaf	7–5, 6–3
Win	3–1	Sep 2013	ITF Sharm El Sheikh, Egypt	10k	Hard	(Italy) Giulia Bruzzone	4–6, 6–0, 6–2
Loss	3–2	Oct 2013	ITF Sharm El Sheikh	10k	Hard	(Russia) Anna Morgina	3–6, 6–3, 5–7
Win	4–2	Jan 2014	ITF Sharm El Sheikh	10k	Hard	(Greece) Despina Papamichail	6–3, 7–6^{(0)}
Win	5–2	Apr 2014	ITF Antalya, Turkey	10k	Hard	(Israel) Deniz Khazaniuk	7–5, 4–6, 6–1
Win	6–2	Jun 2014	ITF Adana, Turkey	10k	Hard	(Turkey) Başak Eraydın	4–6, 6–1, 6–2
Win	7–2	Jun 2014	ITF İstanbul, Turkey	10k	Hard	(Turkey) Melis Sezer	6–3, 6–4
Loss	7–3	Aug 2014	ITF İstanbul, Turkey	10k	Hard	(China) Yang Zhaoxuan	6–7^{(4)}, 1–6
Loss	7–4	Aug 2014	ITF Antalya, Turkey	10k	Hard	(France) Clothilde de Bernardi	4–6, 6–2, 3–6
Loss	7–5	May 2015	ITF Caserta, Italy	25k	Clay	(Russia) Daria Kasatkina	6–7^{(4)}, 1–6
Win	8–5	Jul 2015	Bursa Cup, Turkey	50k	Clay	(Latvia) Anastasija Sevastova	7–5, 3–6, 6–1
Loss	8–6	Jun 2016	ITF Padua, Italy	25k	Clay	(China) Xu Shilin	7–5, 4–6, 3–6
Loss	8–7	Sep 2016	Zhuhai Open, China	50k	Hard	(Belarus) Olga Govortsova	1–6, 2–6
Loss	8–8	Jul 2017	Bursa Cup, Turkey	60k	Clay	(Russia) Sofya Zhuk	6–4, 3–6, 6–7^{(5)}
Win	9–8	Mar 2019	ITF Sharm El Sheikh, Egypt	W15	Hard	(United States) Nadja Gilchrist	6–3, 6–3
Win	10–8	Apr 2019	ITF Sharm El Sheikh, Egypt	W15	Hard	(Belgium) Magali Kempen	7–6^{(2)}, 6–4
Win	11–8	May 2019	ITF Nonthaburi, Thailand	W25	Hard	(China) Yuan Yue	7–6^{(2)}, 6–1
Win	12–8	Jun 2019	Figueira da Foz Open, Portugal	W25+H	Hard	(Canada) Katherine Sebov	6–7^{(2)}, 7–6^{(5)}, 6–3
Loss	12–9	Jul 2019	ITS Cup, Czech Republic	W25	Clay	(Czech Republic) Jesika Malečková	3–6, 4–6

=== Doubles: 29 (18 titles, 11 runner-ups) ===
Result	W–L	Date	Tournament	Tier	Surface	Partner	Opponents	Score
Win	1–0	May 2012	ITF İstanbul, Turkey	10k	Clay	(Turkey) Başak Eraydın	(China) Liu Chang (China) Zhang Nannan	3–6, 6–2, [10–5]
Win	2–0	Jun 2013	ITF İstanbul, Turkey	10k	Hard	(Turkey) Melis Sezer	(Turkey) Başak Eraydın (Bosnia and Herzegovina) Jasmina Tinjić	6–4, ret.
Loss	2–1	Aug 2013	ITF İzmir, Turkey	10k	Hard	(Bulgaria) Julia Stamatova	(Ukraine) Khristina Kazimova (Germany) Christina Shakovets	4–6, 1–6
Win	3–1	Dec 2013	ITF İstanbul, Turkey	10k	Hard (i)	(Belgium) Elise Mertens	(Japan) Yuuki Tanaka (Russia) Ekaterina Yashina	6–0, 7–6^{(3)}
Win	4–1	Jan 2014	ITF Sharm El Sheikh, Egypt	10k	Hard	(Turkey) Melis Sezer	(Greece) Despina Papamichail (Italy) Gaia Sanesi	4–6, 6–4, [10–3]
Loss	4–2	Jan 2014	ITF Sharm El Sheikh, Egypt	10k	Hard	(Turkey) Melis Sezer	(Ukraine) Valentyna Ivakhnenko (Ukraine) Veronika Kapshay	6–3, 4–6, [5–10]
Loss	4–3	Mar 2014	ITF Antalya, Turkey	10k	Hard	(Czech Republic) Barbora Krejčíková	(Sweden) Susanne Celik (Japan) Kotomi Takahata	4–6, 3–6
Loss	4–4	Apr 2014	ITF Antalya, Turkey	10k	Hard	(Turkey) Melis Sezer	(Czech Republic) Denisa Allertová (Slovakia) Chantal Škamlová	2–6, 1–6
Win	5–4	Jun 2014	ITF Adana, Turkey	10k	Hard	(Turkey) Başak Eraydın	(Ukraine) Alona Fomina (Russia) Ekaterina Tsiklauri	6–3, 6–1
Win	6–4	Jun 2014	ITF İstanbul, Turkey	10k	Hard	(Turkey) Ayla Aksu	(Belgium) Elke Lemmens (Bulgaria) Julia Stamatova	4–6, 6–3, [10–4]
Win	7–4	Oct 2014	ITF İstanbul, Turkey	25k	Hard (i)	(Switzerland) Xenia Knoll	(Turkey) Ayla Aksu (Turkey) Müge Töpsel	6–2, 6–4
Loss	7–5	Dec 2014	ITF Istanbul, Turkey	10k	Hard (i)	(Turkey) Ayla Aksu	(Croatia) Jana Fett (Croatia) Adrijana Lekaj	3–6, 4–6
Loss	7–6	Feb 2015	Rancho Santa Fe Open, US	25k	Hard	(Serbia) Nina Stojanović	(United States) Samantha Crawford (United States) Asia Muhammad	0–6, 3–6
Win	8–6	May 2015	ITF La Marsa, Tunisia	25k	Clay	(Turkey) Pemra Özgen	(Georgia (country)) Sofia Shapatava (Ukraine) Anastasiya Vasylyeva	3–6, 6–3, [10–4]
Loss	8–7	May 2015	ITF Caserta, Italy	25k	Clay	(Italy) Alice Matteucci	(Georgia (country)) Ekaterine Gorgodze (Georgia (country)) Sofia Shapatava	0–6, 6–7^{(6)}
Win	9–7	Jul 2015	ITF Denain, France	25k	Clay	(Belgium) Elise Mertens	(Switzerland) Xenia Knoll (Argentina) Florencia Molinero	7–6^{(3)}, 6–3
Loss	9–8	Nov 2015	Dubai Tennis Challenge, UAE	75k	Hard	(Belgium) Elise Mertens	(Turkey) Çağla Büyükakçay (Greece) Maria Sakkari	6–7^{(6)}, 4–6
Win	10–8	Feb 2016	ITF Beinasco, Italy	25k	Clay (i)	(Netherlands) Arantxa Rus	(North Macedonia) Lina Gjorcheska (Bosnia and Herzegovina) Dea Herdželaš	6–4, 6–2
Loss	10–9	May 2016	Nana Trophy, Tunisia	50k	Clay	(Russia) Irina Khromacheva	(Australia) Arina Rodionova (Ukraine) Valeriya Strakhova	1–6, 2–6
Win	11–9	Jul 2016	ATV di Roma, Italy	50k	Clay	(China) Xu Shilin	(Hungary) Réka Luca Jani (Georgia (country)) Sofia Shapatava	7–5, 6–1
Win	12–9	Apr 2017	Lale Cup, Turkey	60k	Hard	(Russia) Veronika Kudermetova	(Russia) Ksenia Lykina (Russia) Polina Monova	4–6, 7–5, [11–9]
Win	13–9	Aug 2017	ITF Bad Saulgau, Germany	25k	Clay	(Russia) Anna Kalinskaya	(Romania) Nicoleta Dascalu (Romania) Cristina Dinu	6–2, 6–2
Win	14–9	Jun 2018	ITF Padua, Italy	25k	Clay	(Czech Republic) Anastasia Zarycká	(Bosnia and Herzegovina) Dea Herdželaš (Croatia) Tereza Mrdeža	6–4, 6–1
Loss	14–10	Aug 2018	ITF Las Palmas, Spain	25k	Clay	(Turkey) Başak Eraydın	(Russia) Yana Sizikova (Norway) Ulrikke Eikeri	2–6, 4–6
Win	15–10	Jan 2019	ITF Monastir, Tunisia	W15	Hard	(China) Zhang Ying	(Spain) Claudia Hoste Ferrer (Bulgaria) Julia Terziyska	6–3, 6–3
Win	16–10	Mar 2019	ITF Sharm El Sheikh, Egypt	W15	Hard	(Sweden) Jacqueline Cabaj Awad	(Kazakhstan) Gozal Ainitdinova (Russia) Ekaterina Kazionova	6–2, 6–4
Win	17–10	May 2019	ITF Nonthaburi, Thailand	W25	Hard	(Bulgaria) Aleksandrina Naydenova	(Japan) Haruka Kaji (Japan) Risa Ozaki	6–1, 6–3
Win	18–10	Jun 2019	ITF Akko, Israel	W25	Hard	(Croatia) Silvia Njirić	(Israel) Shelly Bereznyak (Kazakhstan) Yekaterina Dmitrichenko	6–2, 6–0
Loss	18–11	Aug 2019	Verbier Open, Switzerland	W25	Clay	(Liechtenstein) Kathinka von Deichmann	(Switzerland) Xenia Knoll (Switzerland) Simona Waltert	4–6, 3–6

== Junior Grand Slam finals ==
=== Doubles: 1 (title) ===
Result	Year	Tournament	Surface	Partner	Opponents	Score
Win	2014	US Open	Hard	(Switzerland) Jil Teichmann	(Belarus) Vera Lapko (Slovakia) Tereza Mihalíková	5–7, 6–2, [10–7]
