= 2019 Lale Cup – Doubles =

Doubles
- 2019 Lale Cup

Final
- Champions: (Czech Republic) Marie Bouzková (Netherlands) Rosalie van der Hoek
- Runners-up: (Belarus) Ilona Kremen (Belarus) Iryna Shymanovich
- Score: 7–5, 6–7^{(2–7)}, [10–5]

Events
Singles	Doubles
← 2018 ·	Lale Cup	· 2020 →

Ayla Aksu and Harriet Dart were the defending champions, but both players chose not to participate.

Marie Bouzková and Rosalie van der Hoek won the title, defeating Ilona Kremen and Iryna Shymanovich in the final, 7–5, 6–7^{(2–7)}, [10–5].

== Seeds ==
1. (Russia) Olga Doroshina / (Russia) Polina Monova (first round, withdrew)
2. (Cyprus) Raluca Șerban / (Bulgaria) Isabella Shinikova (semifinals)
3. (Turkey) Berfu Cengiz / (Indonesia) Jessy Rompies (semifinals)
4. (Greece) Valentini Grammatikopoulou / (India) Ankita Raina (first round)

== Draw ==
=== Key ===
- Q = Qualifier
- WC = Wild card
- LL = Lucky loser
- Alt = Alternate
- SE = Special exempt
- PR = Protected ranking
- ITF = ITF entry
- JE = Junior exempt
- w/o = Walkover
- r = Retired
- d = Defaulted
- SR = Special ranking

=== Draw ===
First round
1	(Russia) O Doroshina (Russia) P Monova
(Turkey) Ç Büyükakçay (Croatia) A Vrljić	w/o
(Ukraine) G Poznikhirenko (Uzbekistan) S Sharipova	7	4	[8]
(Czech Republic) M Bouzková (Netherlands) R van der Hoek	5	6	[10]
3	(Turkey) B Cengiz (Indonesia) J Rompies	6	6
WC	(Turkey) Z Erman (Turkey) Z Sönmez	3	4
(Turkey) İ Soylu (Czech Republic) B Štefková	6	6
WC	(Turkey) İ Öz (Turkey) M Sezer	3	3
(Belarus) I Kremen (Belarus) I Shymanovich	6	6
(Hungary) Á Bukta (Slovakia) V Juhászová	2	3
(Belgium) G Minnen (Turkey) P Özgen	7	6
4	(Greece) V Grammatikopoulou (India) A Raina	5	4
(Russia) A Gasanova (Bulgaria) J Terziyska	6	7^{7}
(Oman) F Al-Nabhani (Turkey) C Anıl	1	6^{3}
WC	(Switzerland) L Aiche (Turkey) BE Gümüşsoy	0	0
2	(Cyprus) R Șerban (Bulgaria) I Shinikova	6	6

Quarterfinals
(Turkey) Ç Büyükakçay (Croatia) A Vrljić
(Czech Republic) M Bouzková (Netherlands) R van der Hoek	w/o
3	(Turkey) B Cengiz (Indonesia) J Rompies	1	6	[11]
(Turkey) İ Soylu (Czech Republic) B Štefková	6	4	[9]
(Belarus) I Kremen (Belarus) I Shymanovich	4	6	[11]
(Belgium) G Minnen (Turkey) P Özgen	6	3	[9]
(Russia) A Gasanova (Bulgaria) J Terziyska	6	6^{2}	[7]
2	(Cyprus) R Șerban (Bulgaria) I Shinikova	4	7^{7}	[10]

Semifinals
(Czech Republic) M Bouzková (Netherlands) R van der Hoek	7	7
3	(Turkey) B Cengiz (Indonesia) J Rompies	5	5
(Belarus) I Kremen (Belarus) I Shymanovich	6^{6}	6	[11]
2	(Cyprus) R Șerban (Bulgaria) I Shinikova	7^{8}	3	[9]

Final
(Czech Republic) M Bouzková (Netherlands) R van der Hoek	7	6^{2}	[10]
(Belarus) I Kremen (Belarus) I Shymanovich	5	7^{7}	[5]
