= 2017 Lale Cup – Doubles =

Doubles
- 2017 Lale Cup

Final
- Champion: (Russia) Veronika Kudermetova (Turkey) İpek Soylu
- Runner-up: (Russia) Ksenia Lykina (Russia) Polina Monova
- Score: 4–6, 7–5, [11–9]

Events
Singles	Doubles
← 2016 ·	Lale Cup	· 2018 →

Nigina Abduraimova and Barbora Štefková were the defending champions, but both players chose not to participate.

Veronika Kudermetova and İpek Soylu won the title, defeating Ksenia Lykina and Polina Monova in the final, 4–6, 7–5, [11–9].

== Seeds ==
1. (Russia) Veronika Kudermetova / (Turkey) İpek Soylu (champions)
2. (Romania) Alexandra Cadanțu / (Romania) Andreea Mitu (first round)
3. (Russia) Ksenia Lykina / (Russia) Polina Monova (final)
4. (India) Ankita Raina / (United Kingdom) Emily Webley-Smith (first round)

== Draw ==
=== Key ===
- Q = Qualifier
- WC = Wild card
- LL = Lucky loser
- Alt = Alternate
- SE = Special exempt
- PR = Protected ranking
- ITF = ITF entry
- JE = Junior exempt
- w/o = Walkover
- r = Retired
- d = Defaulted
- SR = Special ranking

First round
1	(Russia) V Kudermetova (Turkey) İ Soylu	6	6
(Greece) V Grammatikopoulou (Bosnia and Herzegovina) A Husarić	2	1
(Uzbekistan) S Sharipova (Russia) E Yashina	6	4	[10]
(Turkey) B Eraydın (Georgia (country)) E Gorgodze	3	6	[8]
4	(India) A Raina (United Kingdom) E Webley-Smith	5	5
WC	(Turkey) A Aksu (Turkey) P Özgen	7	7
(Ukraine) O Ianchuk (Ukraine) V Strakhova	2	3
WC	(Bulgaria) J Terziyska (Croatia) A Vrljić	6	6
(Poland) M Fręch (Bulgaria) I Shinikova	6	2	[10]
(Russia) O Doroshina (Belarus) V Lapko	3	6	[8]
WC	(Hungary) Á Bukta (Czech Republic) P Krejsová	3	2
3	(Russia) K Lykina (Russia) P Monova	6	6
(Romania) M Buzărnescu (Ukraine) A Fomina	6	6
(Poland) K Kawa (Bosnia and Herzegovina) J Tinjić	4	3
(Russia) A Panova (Russia) A Silich	6	6
2	(Romania) A Cadanțu (Romania) A Mitu	1	2

Quarterfinals
1	(Russia) V Kudermetova (Turkey) İ Soylu	7	4	[10]
(Uzbekistan) S Sharipova (Russia) E Yashina	5	6	[6]
WC	(Turkey) A Aksu (Turkey) P Özgen	6	6
WC	(Bulgaria) J Terziyska (Croatia) A Vrljić	1	1
(Poland) M Fręch (Bulgaria) I Shinikova	2	0
3	(Russia) K Lykina (Russia) P Monova	6	6
(Romania) M Buzărnescu (Ukraine) A Fomina	6	7
(Russia) A Panova (Russia) A Silich	2	5

Semifinals
1	(Russia) V Kudermetova (Turkey) İ Soylu	6	6
WC	(Turkey) A Aksu (Turkey) P Özgen	3	2
3	(Russia) K Lykina (Russia) P Monova	6	6
(Romania) M Buzărnescu (Ukraine) A Fomina	3	3

Final
1	(Russia) V Kudermetova (Turkey) İ Soylu	4	7	[11]
3	(Russia) K Lykina (Russia) P Monova	6	5	[9]
