= 2018 Lale Cup – Singles =

Singles
- 2018 Lale Cup

Final
- Champion: (Uzbekistan) Sabina Sharipova
- Runner-up: (Russia) Elena Rybakina
- Score: 7–6^{(7–0)}, 6–4

Events
Singles	Doubles
← 2017 ·	Lale Cup	· 2019 →

Başak Eraydın was the defending champion, but lost in the first round to Ilona Georgiana Ghioroaie.

Sabina Sharipova won the title, defeating Elena Rybakina in the final, 7–6^{(7–0)}, 6–4.

== Seeds ==
1. (Russia) Ekaterina Alexandrova (first round)
2. (Slovakia) Viktória Kužmová (semifinals)
3. (Bulgaria) Viktoriya Tomova (first round)
4. (Turkey) Başak Eraydın (first round)
5. (Russia) Vitalia Diatchenko (first round)
6. (Netherlands) Lesley Kerkhove (first round)
7. (Spain) Paula Badosa Gibert (withdrew)
8. (Turkey) İpek Soylu (first round)

== Draw ==
=== Key ===
- Q = Qualifier
- WC = Wild card
- LL = Lucky loser
- Alt = Alternate
- SE = Special exempt
- PR = Protected ranking
- ITF = ITF entry
- JE = Junior exempt
- w/o = Walkover
- r = Retired
- d = Defaulted
- SR = Special ranking

=== Finals ===
Semifinals
(Uzbekistan) Sabina Sharipova	6	2	6
Q	(Russia) Olga Doroshina	3	6	3
(Russia) Elena Rybakina	7^{7}	6
2	(Slovakia) Viktória Kužmová	6^{2}	3

Final
(Uzbekistan) Sabina Sharipova	7^{7}	6
(Russia) Elena Rybakina	6^{0}	4

=== Top half ===
First round
1	(Russia) E Alexandrova	4	6	6^{5}
WC	(Turkey) P Özgen	6	3	7^{7}
(Serbia) O Danilović	6	6
(France) J Ponchet	2	4
(Uzbekistan) S Sharipova	6	6
(Czech Republic) P Krejsová	4	2
(Slovakia) K Kučová	6	6
8	(Turkey) İ Soylu	2	3
4	(Turkey) B Eraydın	2	7	1
Q	(Romania) IG Ghioroaie	6	5	6
(Russia) V Kamenskaya	7^{7}	4	2
Q	(Russia) O Doroshina	6^{4}	6	6
WC	(Turkey) İ Öz	1	1
Q	(Serbia) N Kostić	6	6
(Italy) C Ferrando	4	6	7^{7}
6	(Netherlands) L Kerkhove	6	3	6^{4}

Second round
WC	(Turkey) P Özgen	4	3
(Serbia) O Danilović	6	6
(Uzbekistan) S Sharipova	6^{4}	6	6
(Slovakia) K Kučová	7^{7}	2	3
Q	(Romania) IG Ghioroaie	7^{7}	2	3
Q	(Russia) O Doroshina	6^{4}	6	6
Q	(Serbia) N Kostić	6	7
(Italy) C Ferrando	3	5

Quarterfinals
(Serbia) O Danilović	6^{5}	7^{7}	3
(Uzbekistan) S Sharipova	7^{7}	6^{2}	6
Q	(Russia) O Doroshina	7	6
Q	(Serbia) N Kostić	5	3

Semifinals
(Uzbekistan) S Sharipova	6	2	6
Q	(Russia) O Doroshina	3	6	3

=== Bottom half ===
First round
5	(Russia) V Diatchenko	7	5	3
(Georgia (country)) E Gorgodze	5	7	6
(Czech Republic) T Smitková	7^{7}	7^{8}
(Turkey) A Aksu	6^{2}	6^{6}
(United Kingdom) H Dart	6	6
Q	(Russia) A Gasanova	1	3
(Russia) E Rybakina	6	6
3	(Bulgaria) V Tomova	4	3
LL	(Australia) S Tomic	2	0
(Russia) A Potapova	6	6
(Ukraine) G Poznikhirenko	6	6
WC	(Turkey) S Övünç	2	0
WC	(Turkey) B Cengiz	2	1
PR	(Slovakia) R Šramková	6	6
(Czech Republic) J Malečková	1	2
2	(Slovakia) V Kužmová	6	6

Second round
(Georgia (country)) E Gorgodze	5	5
(Czech Republic) T Smitková	7	7
(United Kingdom) H Dart	4	0^{r}
(Russia) E Rybakina	6	0
(Russia) A Potapova	2	7	7
(Ukraine) G Poznikhirenko	6	5	5
PR	(Slovakia) R Šramková	6^{6}	3
2	(Slovakia) V Kužmová	7^{8}	6

Quarterfinals
(Czech Republic) T Smitková	6^{8}	6^{6}
(Russia) E Rybakina	7^{10}	7^{8}
(Russia) A Potapova	1	2
2	(Slovakia) V Kužmová	6	6

Semifinals
(Russia) E Rybakina	7^{7}	6
2	(Slovakia) V Kužmová	6^{2}	3
