= 2018 Lale Cup =

- Date: 9–15 April
- Edition: 6th
- Category: ITF Women's Circuit
- Prize money: $60,000
- Surface: Hard
- Location: Istanbul, Turkey

Champions

Singles
- (Uzbekistan) Sabina Sharipova

Doubles
- (Turkey) Ayla Aksu / (United Kingdom) Harriet Dart
← 2017 ·	Lale Cup	· 2019 →

The 2018 Lale Cup was a professional tennis tournament played on outdoor hard courts. It was the sixth edition of the tournament and was part of the 2018 ITF Women's Circuit. It took place in Istanbul, Turkey, on 9–15 April 2018.

== Singles main draw entrants ==
=== Seeds ===
Country	Player	Rank^{1}	Seed
RUS	Ekaterina Alexandrova	98	1
SVK	Viktória Kužmová	105	2
BUL	Viktoriya Tomova	143	3
TUR	Başak Eraydın	156	4
RUS	Vitalia Diatchenko	167	5
NED	Lesley Kerkhove	195	6
~~ESP~~	~~Paula Badosa Gibert~~	~~210~~	~~7~~
TUR	İpek Soylu	214	8

- ^{1} Rankings as of 2 April 2018.

=== Other entrants ===
The following players received a wildcard into the singles main draw:

- (Turkey) Berfu Cengiz
- (Turkey) Selin Övünç
- (Turkey) İpek Öz
- (Turkey) Pemra Özgen

The following players received entry using protected rankings:

- (Slovakia) Rebecca Šramková

The following players received entry from the qualifying draw:

- (Russia) Olga Doroshina
- (Russia) Anastasia Gasanova
- (Romania) Ilona Georgiana Ghioroaie
- (Serbia) Natalija Kostić

The following player received entry as a lucky loser:

- (Australia) Sara Tomic

== Champions ==
=== Singles ===
- (Uzbekistan) Sabina Sharipova def. (Russia) Elena Rybakina, 7–6^{(7–0)}, 6–4

=== Doubles ===
- (Turkey) Ayla Aksu / (United Kingdom) Harriet Dart def. (Russia) Olga Doroshina / (Russia) Anastasia Potapova, 6–4, 7–6^{(7–3)}
