= 2019 Lale Cup – Singles =

Singles
- 2019 Lale Cup

Final
- Champion: (Russia) Vitalia Diatchenko
- Runner-up: (India) Ankita Raina
- Score: 6–4, 6–0

Events
Singles	Doubles
← 2018 ·	Lale Cup	· 2020 →

Sabina Sharipova was the defending champion, but lost in the first round to Jana Čepelová.

Vitalia Diatchenko won the title, defeating Ankita Raina in the final, 6–4, 6–0.

== Seeds ==
1. (Russia) Vitalia Diatchenko (champion)
2. (Czech Republic) Marie Bouzková (semifinals)
3. (Uzbekistan) Sabina Sharipova (first round)
4. (Kazakhstan) Elena Rybakina (first round)
5. (Greece) Valentini Grammatikopoulou (quarterfinals)
6. (India) Ankita Raina (final)
7. (Belgium) Greet Minnen (quarterfinals)
8. (Cyprus) Raluca Șerban (quarterfinals)

== Draw ==
=== Key ===
- Q = Qualifier
- WC = Wild card
- LL = Lucky loser
- Alt = Alternate
- SE = Special exempt
- PR = Protected ranking
- ITF = ITF entry
- JE = Junior exempt
- w/o = Walkover
- r = Retired
- d = Defaulted
- SR = Special ranking

=== Finals ===
Semifinals
1	(Russia) Vitalia Diatchenko	6	6
(Slovakia) Jana Čepelová	0	2
6	(India) Ankita Raina	6	7^{11}
2	(Czech Republic) Marie Bouzková	4	6^{9}

Final
1	(Russia) Vitalia Diatchenko	6	6
6	(India) Ankita Raina	4	0

=== Top half ===
First round
1	(Russia) V Diatchenko	6	6
(Oman) F Al-Nabhani	3	1
Q	(Australia) I Popovic	4	4
(Ukraine) G Poznikhirenko	6	6
WC	(Turkey) İ Öz	2	5
(Ukraine) O Ianchuk	6	7
(Turkey) P Özgen	5	3
8	(Cyprus) R Șerban	7	6
3	(Uzbekistan) S Sharipova	0	6	4
(Slovakia) J Čepelová	6	4	6
Q	(Belarus) I Kremen	4	6^{5}
(Bulgaria) I Shinikova	6	7^{7}
WC	(Turkey) Z Sönmez	6^{2}	3
(Turkey) B Cengiz	7^{7}	6
(Russia) P Monova	6	1^{r}
5	(Greece) V Grammatikopoulou	4	3

Second round
1	(Russia) V Diatchenko	6	6
(Ukraine) G Poznikhirenko	0	0
(Ukraine) O Ianchuk	1	0^{r}
8	(Cyprus) R Șerban	6	3
(Slovakia) J Čepelová	6	3	6
(Bulgaria) I Shinikova	4	6	2
(Turkey) B Cengiz	4	1
5	(Greece) V Grammatikopoulou	6	6

Quarterfinals
1	(Russia) V Diatchenko	6	6
8	(Cyprus) R Șerban	0	2
(Slovakia) J Čepelová	7	6
5	(Greece) V Grammatikopoulou	5	4

Semifinals
1	(Russia) V Diatchenko	6	6
(Slovakia) J Čepelová	0	2

=== Bottom half ===
First round
6	(India) A Raina	6	6
WC	(Turkey) B Tokaç	1	0
Q	(Russia) S Lansere	6	6
(France) A Hesse	4	1
(Russia) A Gasanova	1	3
(Turkey) Ç Büyükakçay	6	6
(Uzbekistan) N Abduraimova	6	6
4	(Kazakhstan) E Rybakina	3	4
7	(Belgium) G Minnen	7^{7}	6
WC	(Turkey) İ Soylu	6^{5}	2
(Russia) O Doroshina	5	6	6
Q	(Croatia) A Vrljić	7	4	2
Q	(Germany) S Wagner	6	6
Q	(Belarus) I Shymanovich	2	4
(Czech Republic) B Štefková	2	1
2	(Czech Republic) M Bouzková	6	6

Second round
6	(India) A Raina	6	6
Q	(Russia) S Lansere	4	1
(Turkey) Ç Büyükakçay	6	6
(Uzbekistan) N Abduraimova	2	2
7	(Belgium) G Minnen	6	6
(Russia) O Doroshina	2	2
Q	(Germany) S Wagner	2	4
2	(Czech Republic) M Bouzková	6	6

Quarterfinals
6	(India) A Raina	6	4	[10]
(Turkey) Ç Büyükakçay	4	6	[6]
7	(Belgium) G Minnen	2	1
2	(Czech Republic) M Bouzková	6	6

Semifinals
6	(India) A Raina	6	7^{11}
2	(Czech Republic) M Bouzková	4	6^{9}
