= 2019 Lale Cup =

- Date: 8–14 April 2019
- Edition: 7th
- Category: ITF Women's World Tennis Tour
- Prize money: $60,000
- Surface: Hard
- Location: Istanbul, Turkey

Champions

Singles
- (Russia) Vitalia Diatchenko

Doubles
- (Czech Republic) Marie Bouzková / (Netherlands) Rosalie van der Hoek
← 2018 ·	Lale Cup	· 2020 →

The 2019 Lale Cup was a professional tennis tournament played on outdoor hard courts. It was the seventh edition of the tournament which was part of the 2019 ITF Women's World Tennis Tour. It took place in Istanbul, Turkey between 8 and 14 April 2019.

== Singles main-draw entrants ==
=== Seeds ===
Country	Player	Rank^{1}	Seed
RUS	Vitalia Diatchenko	96	1
CZE	Marie Bouzková	116	2
UZB	Sabina Sharipova	137	3
KAZ	Elena Rybakina	143	4
GRE	Valentini Grammatikopoulou	169	5
IND	Ankita Raina	194	6
BEL	Greet Minnen	211	7
CYP	Raluca Șerban	213	8

- ^{1} Rankings are as of 1 April 2019.

=== Other entrants ===
The following players received wildcards into the singles main draw:

- (Turkey) İpek Öz
- (Turkey) Zeynep Sönmez
- (Turkey) İpek Soylu
- (Turkey) Betina Tokaç

The following players received entry from the qualifying draw:

- (Belarus) Ilona Kremen
- (Russia) Sofya Lansere
- (Australia) Ivana Popovic
- (Belarus) Iryna Shymanovich
- (Croatia) Ana Vrljić
- (Germany) Stephanie Wagner

== Champions ==
=== Singles ===
- (Russia) Vitalia Diatchenko def. (India) Ankita Raina, 6–4, 6–0

=== Doubles ===
- (Czech Republic) Marie Bouzková / (Netherlands) Rosalie van der Hoek def. (Belarus) Ilona Kremen / (Belarus) Iryna Shymanovich, 7–5, 6–7^{(2–7)}, [10–5]
