= Vukov =

Vukov (Serbian: Вуков) is a Serbo-Croatian surname, related to the male given name Vuk, meaning wolf.

Notable people with this surname include:

- Borivoj Vukov (1929–2010), Serbian wrestler
- Stefano Vukov (born 1987), Croatian tennis coach
- Tina Vukov (born 1988), Croatian singer
- Vice Vukov (1936–2008), Croatian singer and politician

== See also ==
- Vukov Spomenik, Belgrade, Serbia
- Vukov sabor, Serbian cultural event
