= 2017 Lale Cup – Singles =

Singles
- 2017 Lale Cup

Final
- Champion: (Turkey) Başak Eraydın
- Runner-up: (Czech Republic) Petra Krejsová
- Score: 6–3, 6–0

Events
Singles	Doubles
← 2016 ·	Lale Cup	· 2018 →

Barbora Štefková was the defending champion, but chose not to participate.

Başak Eraydın won the title, defeating Petra Krejsová in the final, 6–3, 6–0.

== Seeds ==
1. (Ukraine) Kateryna Kozlova (quarterfinals)
2. (Uzbekistan) Sabina Sharipova (quarterfinals)
3. (Bulgaria) Isabella Shinikova (first round)
4. (Bulgaria) Viktoriya Tomova (first round; retired)
5. (Turkey) İpek Soylu (second round)
6. (Slovakia) Viktória Kužmová (first round)
7. (Russia) Ksenia Lykina (first round)
8. (Russia) Veronika Kudermetova (second round)

== Draw ==
=== Key ===
- Q = Qualifier
- WC = Wild card
- LL = Lucky loser
- Alt = Alternate
- SE = Special exempt
- PR = Protected ranking
- ITF = ITF entry
- JE = Junior exempt
- w/o = Walkover
- r = Retired
- d = Defaulted
- SR = Special ranking

=== Finals ===
Semifinals
(Poland) Magdalena Fręch	3	2
WC	(Turkey) Başak Eraydın	6	6
Q	(Czech Republic) Petra Krejsová	7	6
(Belarus) Vera Lapko	5	4

Final
WC	(Turkey) Başak Eraydın	6	6
Q	(Czech Republic) Petra Krejsová	3	0

=== Top half ===
First round
1	(Ukraine) K Kozlova	6	6
(Russia) O Doroshina	1	4
(Romania) A Mitu	2	3
LL	(Bulgaria) J Terziyska	6	6
(Poland) M Fręch	6	6
(Ukraine) V Strakhova	2	1
(Russia) A Panova	2	4
8	(Russia) V Kudermetova	6	6
4	(Bulgaria) V Tomova	0^{r}
(Greece) V Grammatikopoulou	4
WC	(Turkey) B Eraydın	6	4	7^{10}
(United Kingdom) L Robson	4	6	6^{8}
(Russia) P Monova	6	6
(India) A Raina	1	2
Q	(Austria) P König	6	4	6^{1}
5	(Turkey) İ Soylu	2	6	7^{7}

Second round
1	(Ukraine) K Kozlova	6	6
LL	(Bulgaria) J Terziyska	3	1
(Poland) M Fręch	2	6	6
8	(Russia) V Kudermetova	6	2	1
(Greece) V Grammatikopoulou	1	2
WC	(Turkey) B Eraydın	6	6
(Russia) P Monova	6	2	6
5	(Turkey) İ Soylu	2	6	2

Quarterfinals
1	(Ukraine) K Kozlova	1	4
(Poland) M Fręch	6	6
WC	(Turkey) B Eraydın	6	5	6
(Russia) P Monova	3	7	4

Semifinals
(Poland) M Fręch	3	2
WC	(Turkey) B Eraydın	6	6

=== Bottom half ===
First round
7	(Russia) K Lykina	7	6^{3}	6^{5}
(Romania) A Cadanțu	5	7^{7}	7^{7}
(Georgia (country)) E Gorgodze	6	4	0
Q	(Belarus) S Pirazhenka	2	6	6
Q	(Poland) K Kawa	3	4
Q	(Czech Republic) P Krejsová	6	6
PR	(Romania) M Buzărnescu	7	6
3	(Bulgaria) I Shinikova	5	3
6	(Slovakia) V Kužmová	2	3
(Belarus) V Lapko	6	6
(Italy) J Pieri	6	6
(Ukraine) O Ianchuk	4	4
WC	(Turkey) B Cengiz	2	1
WC	(Turkey) A Aksu	6	6
WC	(Turkey) P Özgen	4	2
2	(Uzbekistan) S Sharipova	6	6

Second round
(Romania) A Cadanțu	6	4	4
Q	(Belarus) S Pirazhenka	3	6	6
Q	(Czech Republic) P Krejsová	6	6
PR	(Romania) M Buzărnescu	3	4
(Belarus) V Lapko	6	6
(Italy) J Pieri	3	4
WC	(Turkey) A Aksu	6	6^{5}	2
2	(Uzbekistan) S Sharipova	3	7^{7}	6

Quarterfinals
Q	(Belarus) S Pirazhenka	0	2
Q	(Czech Republic) P Krejsová	6	6
(Belarus) V Lapko	6	6
2	(Uzbekistan) S Sharipova	1	4

Semifinals
Q	(Czech Republic) P Krejsová	7	6
(Belarus) V Lapko	5	4
