= 2017 Lale Cup =

- Date: 10–16 April
- Edition: 5th
- Category: ITF Women's Circuit
- Prize money: $60,000
- Surface: Hard
- Location: Istanbul, Turkey

Champions

Singles
- (Turkey) Başak Eraydın

Doubles
- (Russia) Veronika Kudermetova / (Turkey) İpek Soylu
- Lale Cup

The 2017 Lale Cup was a professional tennis tournament played on outdoor hard courts. It was the fifth edition of the tournament and part of the 2017 ITF Women's Circuit, offering a total of $60,000 in prize money. It took place in Istanbul, Turkey, from 10 to 16 April 2017.

== Singles main draw entrants ==
=== Seeds ===
Country	Player	Rank^{1}	Seed
UKR	Kateryna Kozlova	112	1
UZB	Sabina Sharipova	140	2
BUL	Isabella Shinikova	145	3
BUL	Viktoriya Tomova	150	4
TUR	İpek Soylu	158	5
SVK	Viktória Kužmová	171	6
RUS	Ksenia Lykina	179	7
RUS	Veronika Kudermetova	196	8

- ^{1} Rankings as of 3 April 2017

=== Other entrants ===
The following players received wildcards into the singles main draw:

- (Turkey) Ayla Aksu
- (Turkey) Berfu Cengiz
- (Turkey) Başak Eraydın
- (Turkey) Pemra Özgen

The following players received entry into the singles main draw by a protected ranking:

- (Romania) Mihaela Buzărnescu

The following players received entry from the qualifying draw:

- (Poland) Katarzyna Kawa
- (Austria) Pia König
- (Czech Republic) Petra Krejsová
- (Belarus) Sviatlana Pirazhenka

The following players received entry into the singles main draw by a lucky loser:

- (Bulgaria) Julia Terziyska

== Champions ==
=== Singles ===
- (Turkey) Başak Eraydın def. (Czech Republic) Petra Krejsová, 6–3, 6–0

=== Doubles ===
- (Russia) Veronika Kudermetova / (Turkey) İpek Soylu def. (Russia) Ksenia Lykina / (Russia) Polina Monova, 4–6, 7–5, [11–9]
