= Stefano Vukov =

Croatian tennis coach (born 1987)

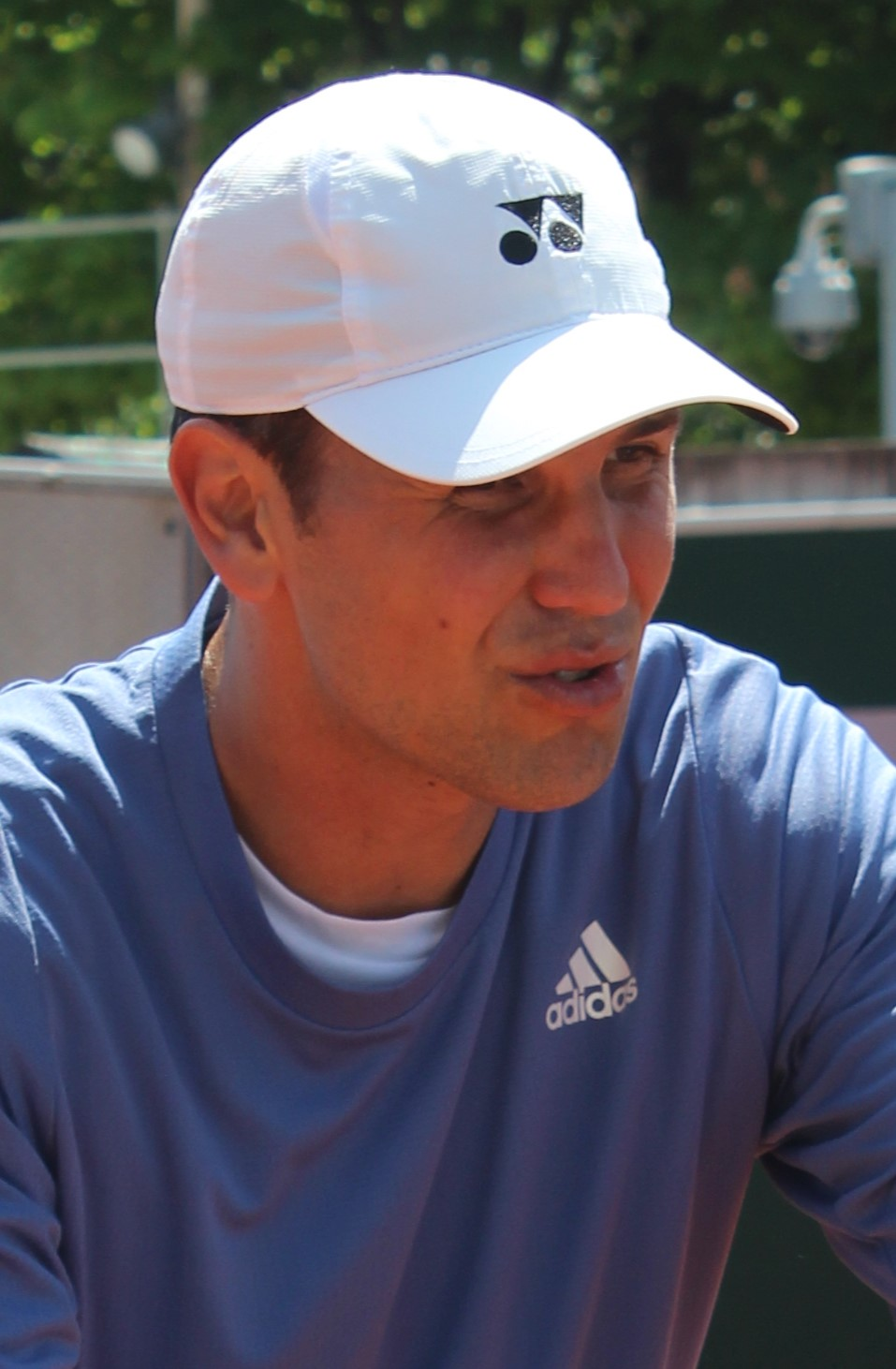
- Vukov at the 2023 French Open
- Country (sports): Croatia
- Born: 27 March 1987 (age 39) Rijeka, SR Croatia, SFR Yugoslavia
- Turned pro: 2003
- Retired: 2009
- Plays: Right-handed
- Prize money: $10,805

Singles
- Highest ranking: No. 1122 (2 April 2007)

Doubles
- Highest ranking: No. 621 (5 February 2007)

Coaching career
- Elena Rybakina (2019–2024, 2025–)

Coaching achievements
- Coachee singles titles total: 12
- List of notable tournaments (with champion): 2026 US Open (Rybakina); 2026 Australian Open (Rybakina); 2025 WTA Finals (Rybakina); 2022 Wimbledon (Rybakina)

Stefano Vukov (born 27 March 1987) is a Croatian tennis coach. He coached Women's Tennis Association (WTA) player Elena Rybakina from 2019 to 2024, and again from 2025.

== Early life and playing career ==
Vukov was born in Rijeka, Croatia. His mother is a dentist and his father is a software engineer. He started playing tennis at age 12 and went to attend college while aspiring to play professional tennis. Vukov played mostly on the ITF Futures Circuit, reaching a career-high Association of Tennis Professionals (ATP) ranking of No. 1122 in 2007, and retired in 2009. A couple years later, he began to coach professionally at a tennis facility in Florida, working with future WTA Tour players including Sachia Vickery, Renata Zarazúa, and Anhelina Kalinina.

== Coaching career ==
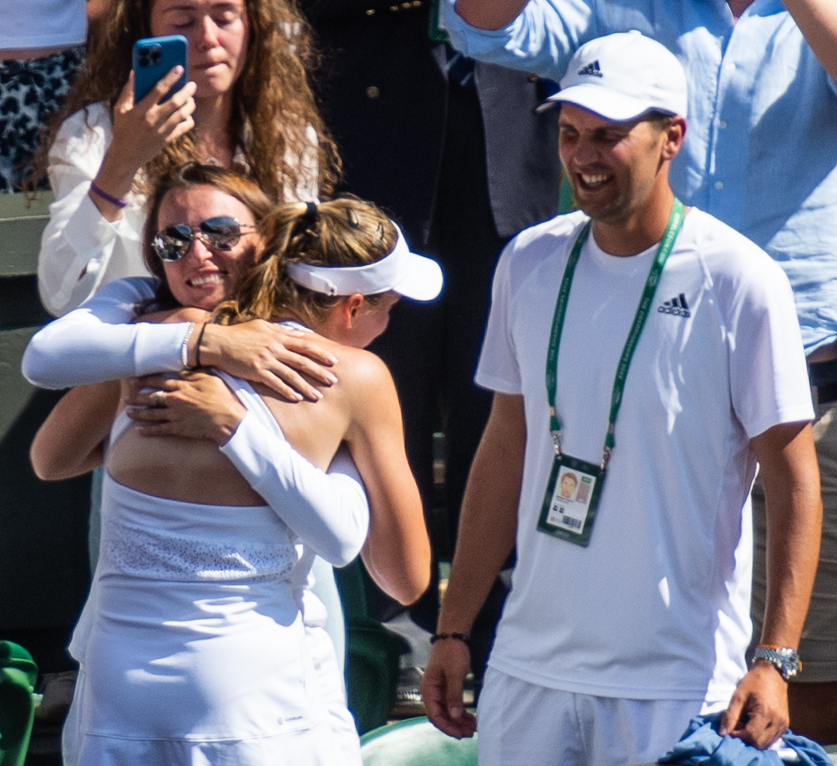
Left to right: Yaroslava Shvedova, Elena Rybakina, and Vukov at Wimbledon 2022

In February 2019, Elena Rybakina, then ranked just within the WTA's top 200, hired Vukov to replace Moscow-based Andrei Chesnokov as her first traveling coach. Rybakina credited Vukov, known for his analytic expertise, with helping to improve her game; she rose quickly through the rankings, entering the top 30 and winning her first two WTA Tour titles by early the next year. After Rybakina won her first major title at the 2022 Wimbledon Championships, Vukov followed through on a two-year-old bet to get a tattoo of Rybakina's name if she ever won Wimbledon.

Vukov's "frantic and intense" style of on-court coaching of the typically stoical Rybakina has drawn attention. Vukov has said he "know[s] very well how to get Elena angry" to energize her and how to help her tactically focus, with a mutual understanding "to push her even when she does not want to be pushed", but recognizes that to outsiders it can seem like "too much". During Rybakina's run to the final of the 2023 Australian Open, where she eventually lost to Aryna Sabalenka, Vukov attracted public criticism for his seemingly harsh midmatch comments from the player's box. In a social media post, Rybakina defended Vukov, saying that their relationship remains positive.

Rybakina played well throughout 2024, winning three titles, but also missed multiple big events due to illness. She announced that she and Vukov had split ahead of the US Open.

In January 2025, Vukov rejoined Rybakina's team, but was subsequently suspended by the WTA under a code of conduct investigation. In August, following a successful appeal, the suspension was lifted allowing Vukov to return to coach Rybakina at the Cincinnati Open. Rybakina went on to win her first WTA Finals title and subsequently claim her second grand slam at the 2026 Australian Open. A third grand slam title followed in the last grand slam of that year at the 2026 US Open.

=== Coaching ban ===
In February 2025, following the conclusion of the code of conduct investigation, it was announced the WTA had banned Vukov for 12 months. In June, it was reported that Vukov had appealed the ban. The suspension was lifted in August following a hearing from an independent tribunal, which allowed Vukov to return to coaching on the tour.
