= 2018 Lale Cup – Doubles =

Doubles
- 2018 Lale Cup

Final
- Champions: (Turkey) Ayla Aksu (United Kingdom) Harriet Dart
- Runners-up: (Russia) Olga Doroshina (Russia) Anastasia Potapova
- Score: 6–4, 7–6^{(7–3)}

Events
Singles	Doubles
- Lale Cup

Veronika Kudermetova and İpek Soylu were the defending champions, but Kudermetova chose to compete at the 2018 Ladies Open Lugano instead. Soylu chose to partner Anastasiya Komardina, but they lost in the quarterfinals to Akgul Amanmuradova and Tereza Smitková.

Ayla Aksu and Harriet Dart won the title, defeating Olga Doroshina and Anastasia Potapova in the final, 6–4, 7–6^{(7–3)}.

== Seeds ==
1. (Russia) Anastasiya Komardina / (Turkey) İpek Soylu (quarterfinals)
2. (Russia) Olga Doroshina / (Russia) Anastasia Potapova (final)
3. (Russia) Alena Fomina / (Russia) Ekaterina Yashina (semifinals)
4. (Turkey) Ayla Aksu / (United Kingdom) Harriet Dart (champions)

== Draw ==
Key

- Q = Qualifier
- WC = Wild card
- LL = Lucky loser
- Alt = Alternate
- ITF = ITF entry
- PR = Protected ranking
- SR = Special ranking
- SE = Special exempt
- JE = Junior exempt
- JR = Junior Accelerator Programme entrant
- CO = College Accelerator Programme entrant
- NG = Next Gen Accelerator Program entrant
- w/o = Walkover
- r = Retired
- d = Defaulted

=== Draw ===
First round
1	(Russia) A Komardina (Turkey) İ Soylu	6	6
(Russia) A Frolova (Kyrgyzstan) K Palkina	2	2
(Uzbekistan) A Amanmuradova (Czech Republic) T Smitková	6^{5}	7^{7}	[10]
(Australia) K Birrell (Croatia) A Vrljić	7^{7}	6^{3}	[8]
4	(Turkey) A Aksu (United Kingdom) H Dart	6	6
WC	(Turkey) C Anıl (Belgium) E Vanlangendonck	3	0
(Serbia) N Kostić (Turkey) M Sezer	2	6	[10]
(Czech Republic) P Krejsová (Czech Republic) J Malečková	6	4	[4]
(Georgia (country)) E Gorgodze (Turkey) P Özgen	1	2
(Romania) AA Roșca (Romania) RG Șerban	6	6
(Turkey) B Cengiz (Turkey) İ Öz	3	7	[1]
3	(Russia) A Fomina (Russia) E Yashina	6	5	[10]
(Ukraine) G Poznikhirenko (Uzbekistan) S Sharipova	6	6
(Romania) L-I Andrei (United Kingdom) E Webley-Smith	3	4
WC	(Russia) A Gasanova (Turkey) S Övünç	6^{2}	2
2	(Russia) O Doroshina (Russia) A Potapova	7^{7}	6

Quarterfinals
1	(Russia) A Komardina (Turkey) İ Soylu	4	5
(Uzbekistan) A Amanmuradova (Czech Republic) T Smitková	6	7
4	(Turkey) A Aksu (United Kingdom) H Dart	6	6
(Serbia) N Kostić (Turkey) M Sezer	1	4
(Romania) AA Roșca (Romania) RG Șerban	3	6	[7]
3	(Russia) A Fomina (Russia) E Yashina	6	4	[10]
(Ukraine) G Poznikhirenko (Uzbekistan) S Sharipova	6	3	[7]
2	(Russia) O Doroshina (Russia) A Potapova	3	6	[10]

Semifinals
(Uzbekistan) A Amanmuradova (Czech Republic) T Smitková	5	3
4	(Turkey) A Aksu (United Kingdom) H Dart	7	6
3	(Russia) A Fomina (Russia) E Yashina	4	0
2	(Russia) O Doroshina (Russia) A Potapova	6	6

Final
4	(Turkey) A Aksu (United Kingdom) H Dart	6	7^{7}
2	(Russia) O Doroshina (Russia) A Potapova	4	6^{3}
