= Elena Rybakina =

Kazakhstani tennis player (born 1999)

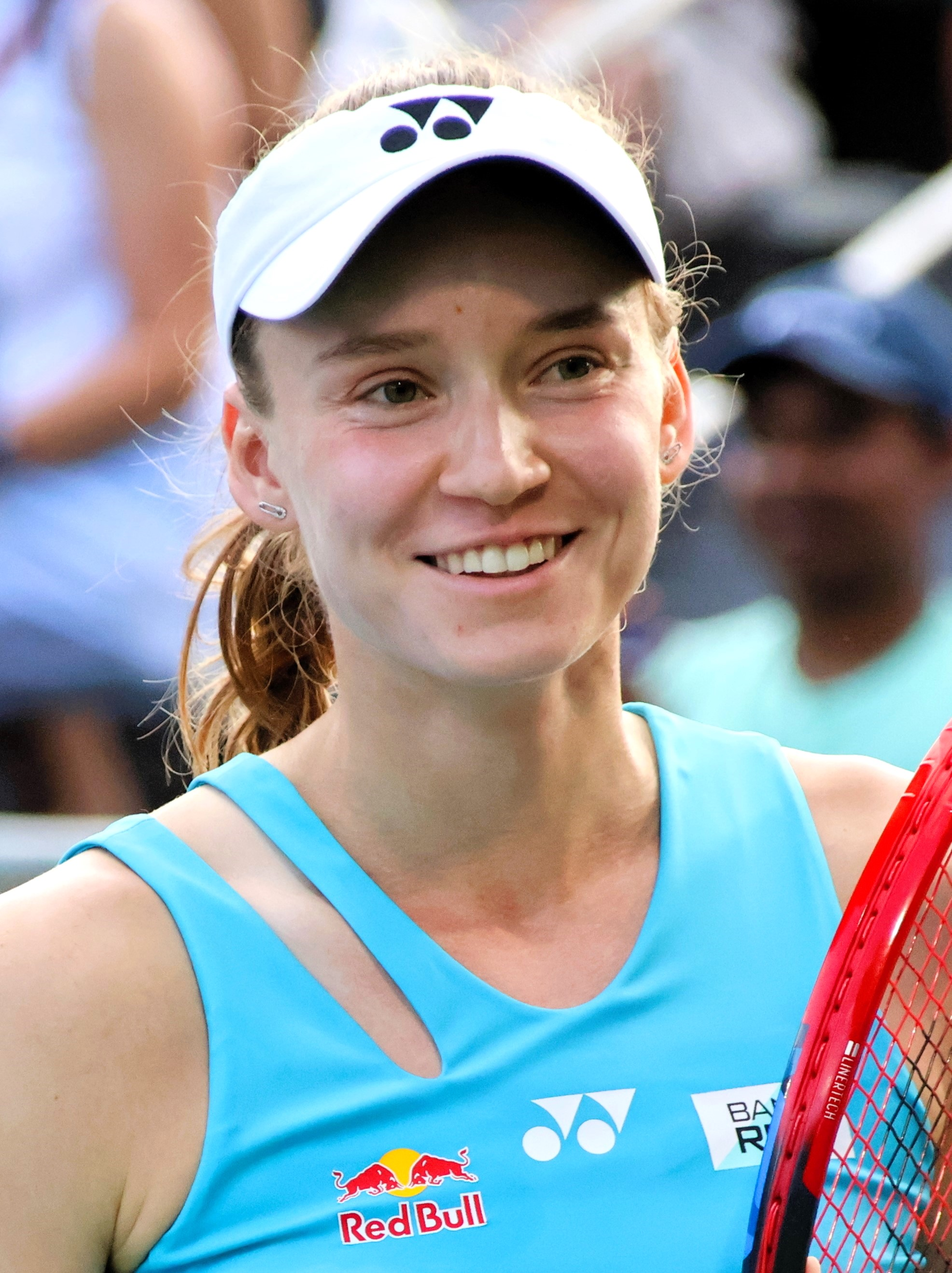
- Rybakina at the 2025 Washington Open
- Full name: Elena Andreyevna Rybakina
- Native name: Елена Андреевна Рыбакина
- Country (sports): Russia (2014–2018); Kazakhstan (2018–)
- Residence: Dubai, United Arab Emirates
- Born: 17 June 1999 (age 27) Moscow, Russia
- Height: 1.84 m (6 ft 0 in)
- Turned pro: 2014
- Plays: Right-handed (two-handed backhand)
- Coach: Stefano Vukov (2019–2024, 2025–)
- Prize money: US$35,573,137 (11th all-time in earnings)

Singles
- Career record: 444–176
- Career titles: 15
- Highest ranking: No. 1 (14 September 2026)
- Current ranking: No. 1 (14 September 2026)

Grand Slam singles results
- Australian Open: W (2026)
- French Open: QF (2021, 2024)
- Wimbledon: W (2022)
- US Open: W (2026)

Other tournaments
- Tour Finals: W (2025)
- Olympic Games: SF – 4th (2021)

Doubles
- Career record: 54–51
- Career titles: 0
- Highest ranking: No. 48 (18 October 2021)

Grand Slam doubles results
- Australian Open: 3R (2023)
- French Open: QF (2021)
- Wimbledon: 1R (2021)
- US Open: 1R (2019)

Grand Slam mixed doubles results
- Australian Open: 1R (2021)
- US Open: 1R (2025)

Team competitions
- BJK Cup: QF (2025)

Signature
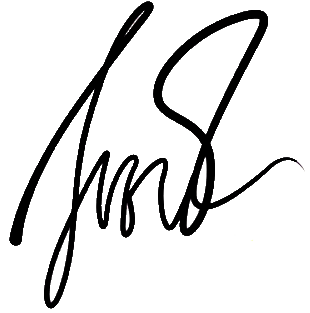
- Last updated on: 16 November 2026.

Elena Andreyevna Rybakina (Note: Russian: Елена Андреевна Рыбакина, romanized: Yelena Rybakina, Russian pronunciation: [jɪˈlʲenə rɨˈbakʲɪnə]; Kazakh: Елена Андреевна Рыбакина..) (born 17 June 1999) is a Russian-born Kazakhstani professional tennis player. She is currently ranked world No. 1 in singles by the Women's Tennis Association (WTA) and will finish as year end No.1 in 2026. Rybakina has won 15 WTA Tour–level singles titles, including three majors, two WTA 1000 titles, and the 2025 WTA Finals. She is the first Kazakhstani player to win a major, and to be ranked world No. 1 and in the world's top 10.

A former junior world No. 3, Rybakina initially represented Russia before switching federations to Kazakhstan in 2018. She had a breakout year in 2020 when she played in five finals, the most of any player that year, and reached her first major quarterfinal in both singles and doubles at the 2021 French Open. Rybakina won her first major title at the 2022 Wimbledon Championships and finished runner-up at the 2023 Australian Open, which saw her debut in the top 10 in the singles rankings. In 2025, she won the WTA Finals, followed by two major (Australian Open and US Open) titles in 2026, which saw her achieve the No. 1 ranking for the first time. She also secured the year end WTA No. 1 ranking for the first time in her career in October 2026, becoming the first woman representing an Asian nation to do so.

Rybakina is noted for her excellent serve and ability to generate high-powered groundstrokes, and plays primarily from the baseline. She is known for her calm demeanour on court, and is sometimes referred to by the nickname "Ice Queen".

== Early life and background ==
Elena Rybakina was born on 17 June 1999 in Moscow to Andrey Rybakin and Ekaterina. Her father was born in Almaty, Kazakhstan. He worked at the Russian First Channel and then, for 10 years, as an on-air producer at NTV Plus. He played tennis in his youth. Elena started playing sports with her older sister, Anna, from a very young age, originally focusing on gymnastics and ice skating. Upon being told that she was too tall to become a professional in either of those sports, her father suggested she switch to tennis instead because of his interest in the sport. Rybakina began playing tennis at the age of six.

Rybakina moved from the Dynamo Sports Club to the Spartak Tennis Club, where she had several accomplished coaches. She trained with former top-10 player Andrey Chesnokov and former top-100 player Evgenia Kulikovskaya. One of her fitness coaches was Irina Kiseleva, a World Championship gold medallist in the modern pentathlon.

Rybakina did not have individual training as a junior, instead practicing in a group of about eight players up until age 15 and a group of four players through age 18. She also only played tennis about two hours per day and trained in fitness for three hours a day. Her time for tennis was limited in part because she attended a regular high school not specialized for athletes and needed to balance tennis with schoolwork.

== Juniors ==
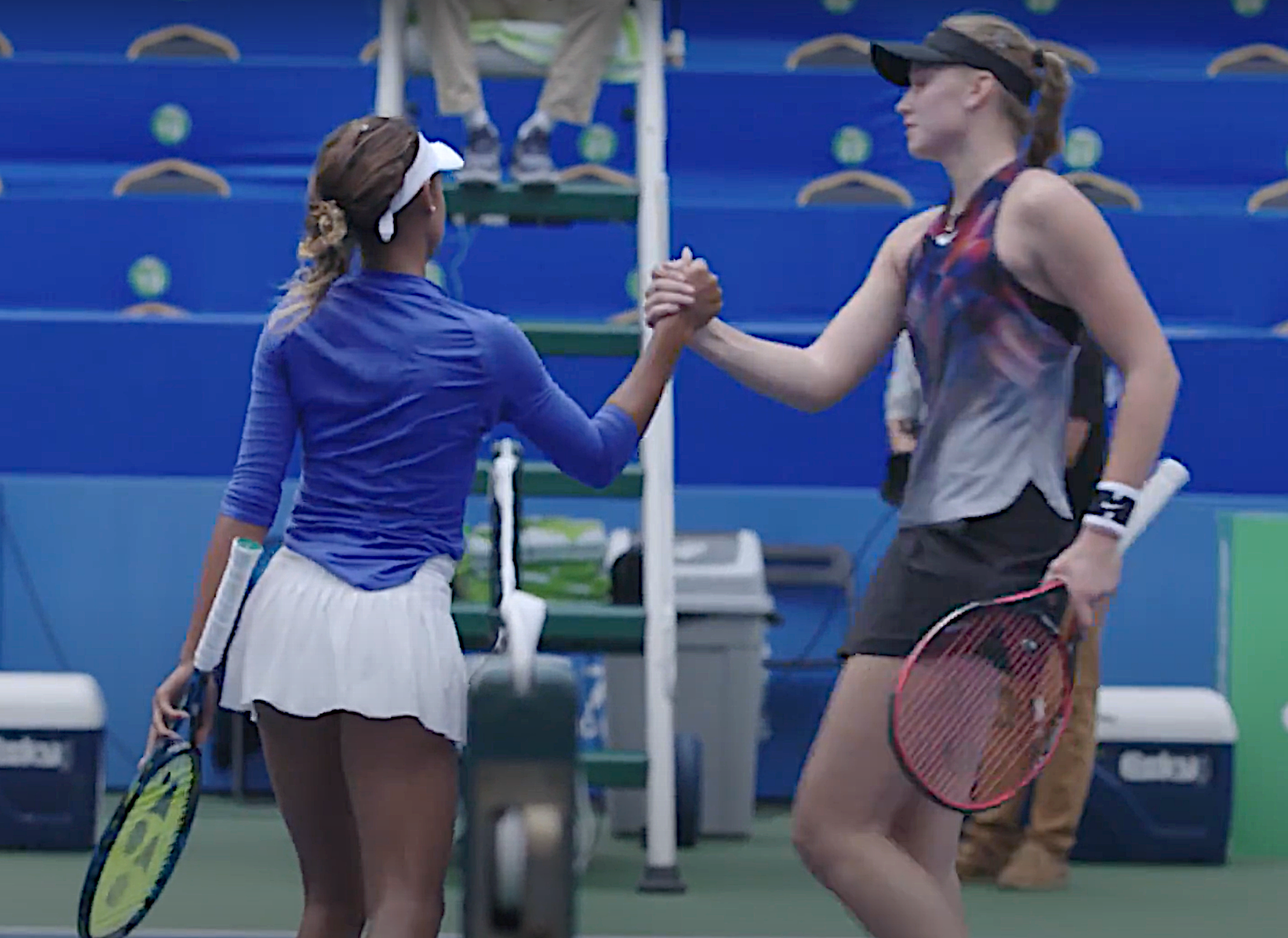
Rybakina (right) and Whitney Osuigwe at the 2017 ITF Junior Masters

Rybakina is a former world No. 3 junior. She began playing on the ITF Junior Circuit in November 2013 at the age of 14. The following March, she won her first title at her second career event, the Grade-3 Almetievsk Cup. She played her first Grade-2 event in June at the Ozerov Cup in Moscow, finishing runner-up to compatriot Anna Blinkova. She began playing Grade-1 events from the start of 2015, but did not have any success until she reached the final at the Belgian International Junior Championships in May, losing to Katharina Hobgarski.

Rybakina made her junior-major debut later in the year at the US Open, where she reached the third round. Following an opening-round loss at the 2016 Australian Open, she won back-to-back Grade-1 titles. She continued to struggle at the junior Grand Slam and other Grade-A events in singles for the rest of the year. Her best result of 2016 at the Grade A-events came in doubles when she finished runner-up to Olesya Pervushina and Anastasia Potapova at the Trofeo Bonfiglio, alongside Amina Anshba in an all-Russian final.

The 2017 season was Rybakina's last year on the junior tour. In the middle of the season, she won her first and only Grade-A title at the Trofeo Bonfiglio, defeating Iga Świątek in the final. She also fared better at the Grand Slam events compared to previous years, losing in the semifinals of the Australian Open and the French Open to eventual champions Marta Kostyuk and Whitney Osuigwe, respectively. She finished her junior career at the first round-robin edition of the ITF Junior Masters, the junior counterpart to the WTA Finals. She won one match in her round-robin group and finished in seventh place.

== Professional ==
=== 2014–18: First ITF titles, federation change ===
Rybakina began playing on the ITF Women's Circuit in December 2014, at the age of fifteen. While she was still playing on the junior circuit, she reached three ITF finals in singles and two in doubles, winning both of the doubles finals only in 2017. She also made her WTA Tour debut in October 2017 at the Kremlin Cup, where she reached the main draw through qualifying but lost in the opening round to Irina-Camelia Begu.

At her next WTA Tour tournament in February 2018, Rybakina won her first WTA Tour match at the St. Petersburg Trophy against Timea Bacsinszky. She then upset world No. 7, Caroline Garcia, in three sets, after saving a match point in the second set. Losing in the next round, this quarterfinal appearance helped her rise from No. 450 to No. 268 in the world. In March, Rybakina won her first $15k singles title in Kazan, where she also won the doubles title. Her next significant rankings jump came in April when she finished runner-up to Sabina Sharipova at the $60k Lale Cup in Istanbul, bringing her to No. 215. She broke into the top 200 for the first time in late May.

Rybakina's family began to grow frustrated with the Russian Tennis Federation over a perceived lack of financial support for Rybakina's career and various incidents involving the federation. At the girls' juniors tournament of the 2016 US Open, Rybakina fainted due to low hemoglobin levels and was forced to retire from her first round match. The RTF reportedly provided no assistance to Rybakina despite being present at the event, leading Rybakina's family to decide that she would no longer travel for tournaments without having a parent present. As the family could not afford to travel with her full-time, they instead decided to focus on playing college tennis in the United States or Canada. In May 2018, having just turned 19 years old, Rybakina acquired Kazakhstani citizenship and switched federations from Russia to Kazakhstan. The Kazakhstan Tennis Federation had offered her financial support to change her nationality, which she chose over various options to play college tennis and pause her professional career. Rybakina's father had contacted the Kazakhstan Tennis Federation about a nationality switch for Rybakina, as he was originally from Kazakhstan.

Playing for Kazakhstan, Rybakina entered her first Grand Slam tournament qualifying draw at the 2018 US Open, but did not reach the main draw.

=== 2019: WTA 250 title, top 50 ===
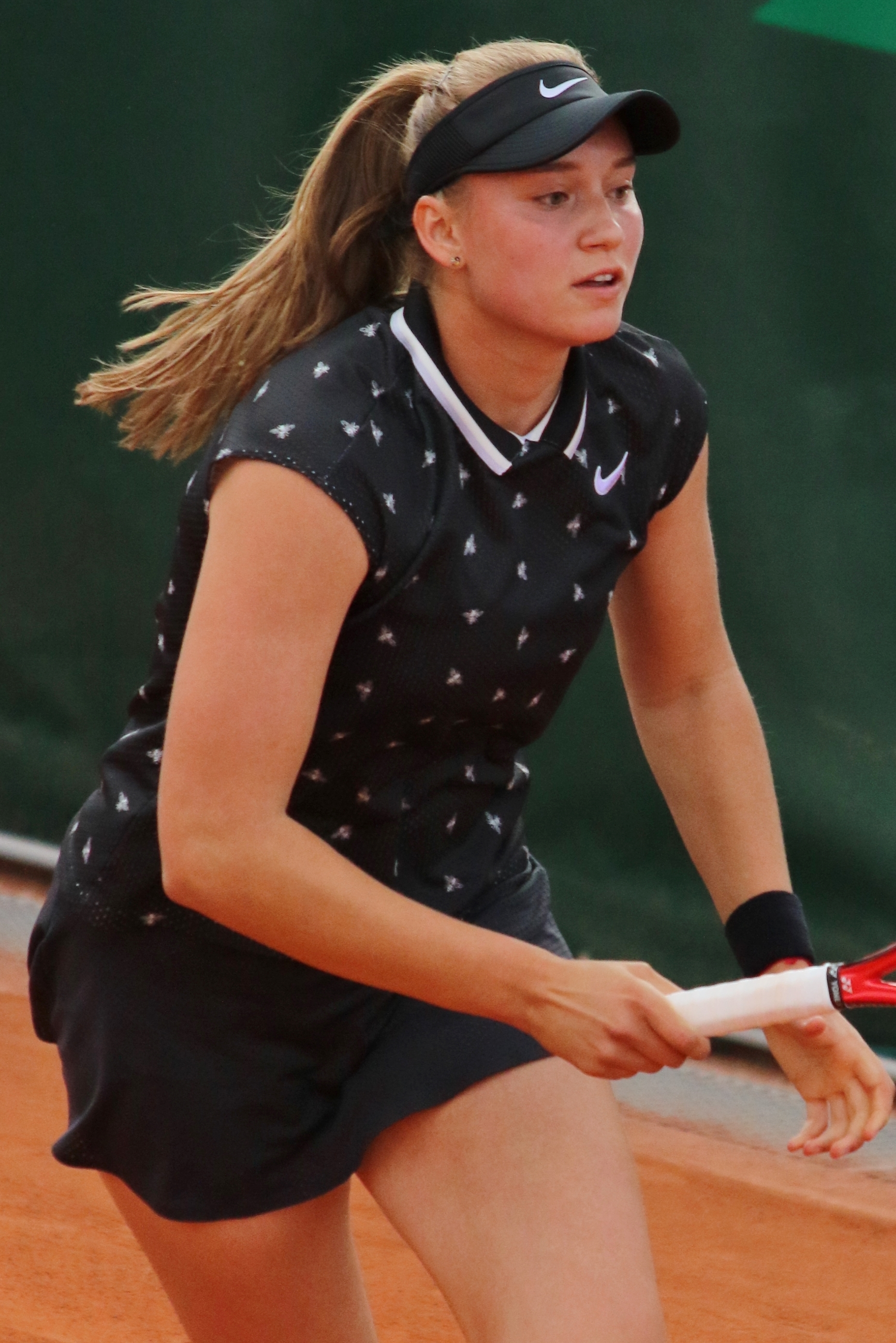
Rybakina at the 2019 French Open

After playing mostly ITF events in the first half of 2019, Rybakina began playing primarily on the WTA Tour in the second half of the season. During the first few months of the year, she won three ITF titles, including the $60k Launceston International. She qualified into her first WTA event at Istanbul Cup, where she lost to Barbora Strýcová in the quarterfinals. She made her major debut at the French Open as a qualifier, losing to Kateřina Siniaková. In her first tour event on grass, Rybakina made her first tour semifinal at the Rosmalen Grass Court Championships. Despite this success, she lost in qualifying at Wimbledon. Rybakina's breakthrough came in July when she won her maiden WTA Tour title at the Bucharest Open, a month after turning 20 years old. During the event, she upset second seed Viktória Kužmová before defeating Patricia Maria Țig in the final. With this title, she made her top 100 debut in the WTA rankings at No. 65.

Rybakina qualified for her second main-draw Grand Slam tournament match of the year at the US Open but again lost in the first round. At her next tournament, she made her second WTA Tour tournament final of the year at the Jiangxi International Open, defeating Viktorija Golubic and Peng Shuai, finishing runner-up to Rebecca Peterson. This result brought her into the top 50 for the first time. Rybakina closed out the year strong, reaching at least the quarterfinals at her last three events of the season. In particular, she reached the quarterfinals at the Wuhan Open, her first career Premier-5 event. In the tournament, she defeated world No. 6, Simona Halep, who retired late in the first set with a lower back injury. She lost in the next round to eventual champion and world No. 14, Aryna Sabalenka. She also reached the semifinals of Luxembourg Open. Rybakina finished the season at No. 37 in the world.

=== 2020: WTA 250 title, top 20 ===
Rybakina led the WTA Tour in finals during the 2020 season, and finished tied for second in match wins. She reached the finals at four of her first five events. Before the COVID-19 pandemic led to the shutdown of the WTA Tour for more than five months, she had reached the final of every tournament except for the Australian Open and the Qatar Ladies Open, losing to world No. 1, Ashleigh Barty, in both instances, the latter in a walkover due to an abductor strain in her leg. Prior to the Australian Open, her two finals came at International events. She reached her first final of the year at the Shenzhen Open defeating Karolína Plíšková, but lost to Ekaterina Alexandrova. She defeated Zhang Shuai to win her second WTA title at the Hobart International. At Melbourne, she recorded her first two Grand Slam main-draw match wins against Bernarda Pera and Greet Minnen, before losing to world No. 1, Ashleigh Barty. Following the tournament, she reached two Premier finals at the St. Petersburg Trophy finishing runner-up to No. 8 Kiki Bertens, and at the Dubai Championships losing to No. 2 Simona Halep in the WTA Match of The Year. At Dubai in particular, Rybakina defeated two top-ten players in No. 7 Sofia Kenin and No. 3 Karolína Plíšková, the latter of whom was the highest ranked player she had defeated so far. These four finals helped her climb to No. 17 in the world at the time of the tour shutdown. She also became the first Kazakhstani player in the top 20 in history. She later withdrew from the Qatar Open after defeating Sorana Cîrstea and Alison Van Uytvanck.

During the bulk of the shutdown, Rybakina stayed in Moscow and did not have the opportunity to practice for two and a half months. She eventually resumed training in Bratislava, Slovakia for five weeks. When the tour resumed in New York in August, she lost her return match to Alexandrova and only recorded one match win at the US Open. Back in Europe, she finally defeated Alexandrova at the Italian Open in her third opportunity of the year before squandering a chance to serve out the match in a third-round loss to compatriot Yulia Putintseva. At the Internationaux de Strasbourg, Rybakina reached her fifth final of the year and first since the resumption of the tour, losing to No. 5, Elina Svitolina. However, she then lost to Fiona Ferro in the second round at the French Open.

=== 2021: French Open quarterfinal, Olympics fourth place ===
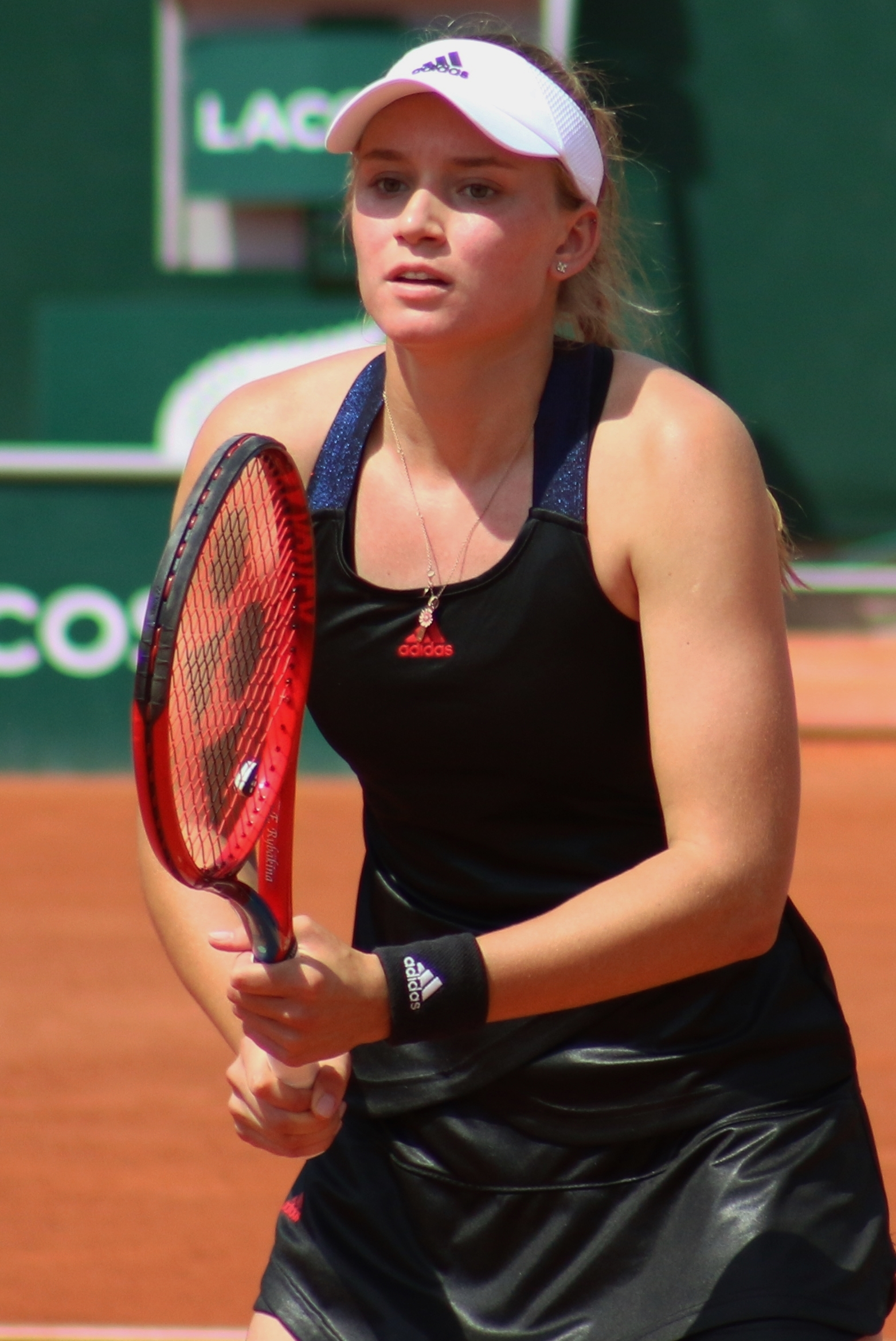
Rybakina at the 2021 French Open

Rybakina started her season at Abu Dhabi losing to eventual champion Aryna Sabalenka in the quarterfinals. She then lost to Fiona Ferro in the second round of Australian Open. After an uneventful stretch of the year where she fell out of top 20, she won two consecutive matches for the first time since Abu Dhabi to reach the third round of French Open. She then defeated Elena Vesnina and Serena Williams to reach her first major quarterfinal. At the same tournament, she also reached the quarterfinals in doubles, partnering Anastasia Pavlyuchenkova; incidentally, Pavlyuchenkova was the opponent who defeated her in the quarterfinals of the singles portion of the 2021 French Open.

Rybakina recorded her first top-10 win on grass at the Eastbourne International defeating second seed Elina Svitolina in straight sets. She reached her first semifinal of the year defeating lucky loser Anastasija Sevastova before falling to eventual champion Jelena Ostapenko. Making her first appearance at the tournament, Rybakina stormed into the fourth round of Wimbledon without dropping a set. There she lost to world No. 2, Aryna Sabalenka, in a tough three-set battle. She made her comeback in top 20 on the back of strong grass season.

Rybakina was the 15th seed of the Olympic Games tennis tournament, defeating Samantha Stosur, Rebecca Peterson, Donna Vekić, and Garbiñe Muguruza all in straight sets to reach the semifinals, where she was defeated by Belinda Bencic. In the bronze medal match, Rybakina was defeated in a comeback by Elina Svitolina. She lost in the third round of US Open to 12th seed Simona Halep. She reached the semifnals of Chicago after the retirement of her opponent Belinda Bencic, where she retired against Ons Jabeur because of gastrointestinal illness. She also made the quarters of Ostrava Open, losing to Iga Świątek.

On 1 November 2021, she made her debut in the top 15, at world No. 14, becoming the highest ranked Kazakhstani player in history.

=== 2022: Wimbledon champion ===
Rybakina started her 2022 season at the Adelaide International where she defeated wildcard Storm Sanders, qualifier Marie Bouzková, Shelby Rogers, and Misaki Doi en route to the final where she was defeated by world No. 1, Ashleigh Barty. Her success continued at the Sydney Tennis Classic with a lopsided first-round defeat of reigning US Open champion Emma Raducanu, before she subsequently withdrew from the tournament citing a thigh injury. She reached a career-high ranking of No. 12 on 17 January 2022.

Her remaining early hardcourt season saw little progress. She defeated Zarina Diyas, before a second-round retirement against Zhang Shuai at the Australian Open due to thigh injury. She defeated Varvara Gracheva, but withdrew before the second round at the St. Petersburg Ladies' Trophy. She lost in the first round to Jaqueline Cristian at the Qatar Ladies Open. Her "Sunshine Double" (Miami and Indian Wells) saw improvement with a quarterfinal appearance at the Indian Wells Open against Maria Sakkari and a third-round appearance to Jessica Pegula at the Miami Open.

Her clay-court season began with a second-round loss to Anhelina Kalinina after a first-round bye at Charleston. Following this, she represented Kazakhstan as the team's top seed and won both of her singles matches in a tie against Germany securing a berth in the finals later in the year. The remainder of her clay-court season saw little achievement as she failed to advance into the quarterfinals at the Stuttgart Open, Madrid Open, Italian Open, and French Open.

Rybakina with the Venus Rosewater Dish at the 2022 Wimbledon Championships

Rybakina's grass-court season in the lead up to Wimbledon saw a second-round loss to Shelby Rogers at the Rosmalen Open followed by a first-round bye and a second-round loss to Lesia Tsurenko at the Eastbourne International. At the Wimbledon Championships, she reached her second Grand Slam quarterfinal, defeating CoCo Vandeweghe, Bianca Andreescu, Zheng Qinwen and Petra Martić. She then defeated Ajla Tomljanović in her quarterfinal match to reach her first major semifinal, becoming the first Kazakhstani singles player (male or female) to reach the semifinal of a Grand Slam. She then defeated Simona Halep in straight sets, to reach her first major final, becoming the youngest Wimbledon finalist since Garbiñe Muguruza in 2015. After dropping the first set, she defeated No. 3 seeded Ons Jabeur in three sets to secure her first major title. She became the youngest women's champion since 21-year-old Petra Kvitová in 2011. She was also the fourth-youngest active Grand Slam champion, older only than Iga Świątek, Bianca Andreescu and Emma Raducanu. Rybakina's Russian nationality and previous international representation of Russia became a matter of public discourse in the aftermath of her success at Wimbledon 2022, where Wimbledon had banned athletes representing Russia and Belarus due to Russia's invasion of Ukraine. Russian state media celebrated Rybakina's win as a national victory despite her longstanding decision not to represent the country of her birth.

The North American hardcourt season began with early losses at the Silicon Valley Classic (first round) and Canadian Open (second). Her US Open preparations continued at the Cincinnati Open where she advanced to the quarterfinals and was defeated by Madison Keys. Her season continued next with an entry to the US Open as the 25th seed; however, she lost in the first round to qualifier Clara Burel. She bounced back reaching the finals of Portorož Open in Slovenia, where she lost to Kateřina Siniaková in three sets. Since her Wimbledon win didn't reward any points, Rybakina failed to qualify for WTA Finals and finished the year ranked 22.

=== 2023: Major final, two WTA 1000 titles, world No. 3 ===
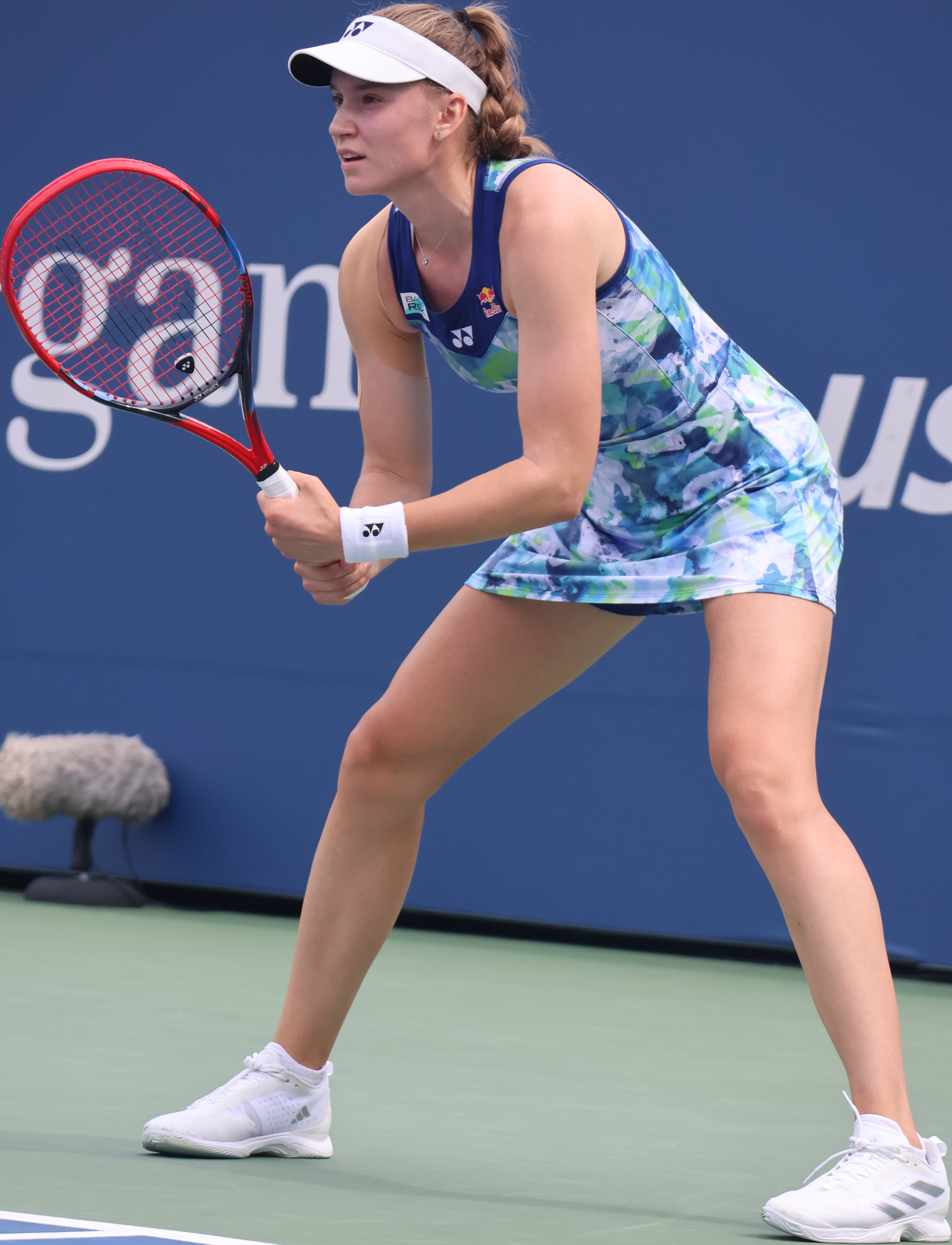
Rybakina at the 2023 US Open

Rybakina started the season at the Adelaide International 1, defeating Danielle Collins in three sets before losing to Marta Kostyuk in the second round. She followed it with another loss in the Adelaide International to Petra Kvitová, in straight sets. However, she reached the doubles final with partner Anastasia Pavlyuchenkova. At the Australian Open, Rybakina defeated 2022 finalist Danielle Collins again in the third round, and world No. 1, Iga Świątek, in the fourth round becoming the first Kazakhstani woman to reach an Australian Open quarterfinal. Next, she defeated former French Open champion Jeļena Ostapenko to reach her first Australian Open semifinal. In the semifinals, she defeated former world No. 1 and two-time Australian Open champion, Victoria Azarenka, in straight sets, reaching the second Grand Slam final of her career. However, despite winning the first set, Rybakina ultimately lost the championship match to Aryna Sabalenka in a high quality encounter. She reached the top 10 on 30 January 2023 making her the first player representing Kazakhstan, male or female, ever to reach the top 10 on either the ATP or WTA rankings.

In Abu Dhabi, defeating Karolina Plíšková, she made the quarterfinals where she lost to Beatriz Haddad Maia. In Dubai, she reached the third round by beating Bianca Andreescu and Marie Bouzková in straight sets. She withdrew from her third round match against fifth seed Coco Gauff due to a lower-back injury. At Indian Wells, as the tenth seed, she made her second consecutive Indian Wells quarterfinal defeating Sofia Kenin, 21st seed Paula Badosa and Varvara Gracheva. Then, she defeated Karolína Muchová to reach her first WTA 1000 semifinal. In the semifinals, she moved past the defending champion Świątek, in straight sets, for the second time in 2023 to reach her first WTA 1000 final. In the final, she edged second seed Aryna Sabalenka in straight sets, reversing the result of their matchup in the Australian Open final for her first WTA 1000 title. This result pushed her singles ranking to a new career-high of world No. 7.

Rybakina saved match point to defeat Paula Badosa in the third round of Miami Open. She then defetaed Elise Mertens, Martina Trevisan, and Jessica Pegula to reach the final. In the final, she lost to 15th seed Petra Kvitová, preventing her from completing the Sunshine Double and ending her career-best 13 match winning streak. She then recorded early second round exits at the Stuttgart Open and the Madrid Open to Beatriz Haddad Maia and Anna Kalinskaya, respectively, and reached a new career-high of world No. 6 on 8 May 2023. She then reached the quarterfinals at the Italian Open and moved to a new career high ranking of world No. 5 with a win over Jasmine Paolini, Anna Kalinskaya by retirement and Markéta Vondroušová. Next she defeated world No. 1, Iga Świątek (who retired during the deciding set due to injury) for the third time to reach her first Rome semifinal. Rybakina reached her third WTA 1000 final of the season defeating Jeļena Ostapenko, becoming the third player in the Open Era to reach the final in the same season at the Australian Open, Indian Wells and Miami Open plus Rome, after Monica Seles in 1991 and Maria Sharapova in 2012. She won her first WTA 1000 clay title, after Anhelina Kalinina retired in the second set, and moved to a career-high ranking of world No. 4, on 22 May 2023. At the 2023 French Open, despite her walkover due to respiratory illness in the third round, she reached No. 3 in the world rankings on 12 June 2023. Rybakina then played in the WTA 500-level Berlin Open on grass, losing to Donna Vekić in the second round. On 26 June 2023, Rybakina announced her withdrawal from the Eastbourne International tournament with a viral illness.

Returning to Wimbledon as defending champion, Rybakina defeated Shelby Rogers,Alizé Cornet, home-favourite Katie Boulter, and Beatriz Haddad Maia to reach the quarterfinals where she lost to Ons Jabeur in three sets in the rematch of last year's final.

Following her quarterfinal loss at Wimbledon, she reached the semifinals at the Canadian Open for the first time in her career. She overcame Jennifer Brady and Sloane Stephens before defeating Daria Kasatkina in a match that lasted 3 hours and 27 minutes, the longest match of Rybakina's career. The match finished at 2:55am local time. In the semifinals Rybakina lost to Liudmila Samsonova in three sets reporting that she felt 'destroyed' physically in the post-match press conference because of the scheduling issues she faced during the tournament.

Rybakina reached the third round of the Cincinnati Open, before retiring in the second set against Jasmine Paolini. She then reached the third round of the US Open as the fourth seed, losing to Sorana Cîrstea in three sets.

At the Beijing Open, Rybakina recorded a straight-sets win over top seed Sabalenka in the quarterfinals, before losing to Liudmila Samsonova in the semifinals.

In November, Rybakina played in her first WTA Finals, where she was eliminated in the group stage.

=== 2024: Three WTA 500 titles, illnesses ===
Rybakina at Brisbane International

Rybakina started her 2024 season at the Brisbane International where she defeated qualifier Olivia Gadecki, Elise Mertens, to reach quarterfinals where her opponent Anastasia Potapova retired in second set, and then defeated Linda Nosková to set up rematch of last year's Australian Open final against Aryna Sabalenka, which he lost. She avenged her loss defeating Sabalenka in straight sets to win the title without dropping a set in the entire tournament. She saved set points to defeat former World No.1 Karolína Plíšková in straight sets, before going out in the second round at the Australian Open to Anna Blinkova in a match that featured the longest tie-break in Grand Slam history.

Rybakina won her second title at the Abu Dhabi Open in February, beating Danielle Collins from a set down, Cristina Bucsa, Ludmilla Samsonova, and Daria Kasatkina. She then defeated Zhu Lin, Emma Navarro, Leylah Fernandez, and Anastasia Pavlyuchenkova to reach the final of the WTA 1000 Qatar Open, losing to Iga Świątek, and reached the quarterfinals of the Dubai Open before withdrawing due to illness.

As defending champion of the Indian Wells Open, Rybakina was forced to withdraw from the tournament shortly before her first match due to illness. She then played in the Miami Open, where she defeated qualifier Clara Tauson in a comeback three setter, another qualifier Taylor Townsend again in three sets, Madison Keys in straight sets to reach quarterfinals. She then defeated Maria Sakkari and Victoria Azarenka both in three sets to reach the finals for the second consecutive year before losing to Danielle Collins.

In April, Rybakina secured her third title of the season at the Porsche Tennis Grand Prix in Stuttgart, beating Veronika Kudermetova in second round, Jasmine Paolini in quarterfinals, two-time defending champion Iga Świątek in the semifinals, all in three sets and then Marta Kostyuk in straight sets in the final. She then played at the Madrid Open, beating Lucia Bronzetti, Mayar Sherif, and qualifier Sára Bejlek all in straight sets to make it to quarterfinals, where she defeated compatriot Yulia Putintseva while saving two match points, before falling to second seed Aryna Sabalenka in three sets in the semifinals. She was forced to withdraw from the Italian Open because of illness, where she was the defending champion. She made it through to the quarterfinals at the French Open, before losing to eventual runner-up Jasmine Paolini.

During the grass-court swing of the year, Rybakina retired due to illness during her quarterfinal match against Victoria Azarenka at the Berlin Ladies Open and then withdrew from the following week's Eastbourne International. At Wimbledon, she steamrollered former world No. 1 Caroline Wozniacki, in just 57 minutes and for the loss of only one game in the third round, before winning her next match when opponent Anna Kalinskaya retired injured in the second set. Rybakina then beat Elina Svitolina in the quarterfinals before losing to Barbora Krejčíková in the semifinals in a three-set match.

Rybakina withdrew from the Paris Olympics two days before it got underway due to acute bronchitis. She defeated qualifier Destanee Aiava in the first round at the US Open but then withdrew from the tournament due to unspecified injuries. On 23 September, Rybakina announced she would miss the entire Asian part of the season due to a back injury.

Rybakina played her first match since August at the WTA Finals in November, losing her opening group contest to Jasmine Paolini in straight sets. She lost her second group match in three sets to Zheng Qinwen. Despite defeating world No. 1, Aryna Sabalenka, in her final group match, Rybakina failed to reach the semifinals.

=== 2025: WTA Finals champion ===
Rybakina began her season at the 2025 United Cup, reaching the semi-finals with team Kazakhstan. She then played in the Australian Open, where she defeated wildcards Emerson Jones and Iva Jovic, and Dayana Yastremska, all in straight sets, before losing to eventual champion Madison Keys in the fourth round. As defending champion, Rybakina defeated qualifier Katie Volynets and Ons Jabeur at the Abu Dhabi Open, before she was defeated in the semifinals by eventual champion Belinda Bencic. She defeated Rebecca Šramková to reach the quarterfinals of Qatar Ladies Open to set up a rematch of the previous years' championship match with Iga Świątek, and was defeated in straight sets. At the 2025 Dubai Tennis Championships, Rybakina saved six match points en route to defeating world No. 10, Paula Badosa. Next, she defeated Sofia Kenin to reach her second semifinal in the Middle East swing and ninth overall at the WTA 1000-level where she lost in three sets to 12th seed and eventual champion Mirra Andreeva.

At Indian Wells, she defeated Suzan Lamens in the second round and Katie Boulter in the third round before losing again to Andreeva in the fourth round, this time in straight sets. Having reached the finals the year prior, Rybakina entered the 2025 Miami Open seeded seventh, and lost to Ashlyn Krueger in three sets in the second round. Defending 500 points from her win in Stuttgart the previous year, she instead opted to play in the qualifiers for the 2025 Billie Jean King Cup. As a result, she dropped to No. 11 in the rankings on 21 April 2025, leaving the top 10 for the first time since January 2023

In April, at the Madrid Open, Rybakina defeated Bianca Andreescu in the second round, before losing to No. 17 seed Elina Svitolina in the third round. However, at the 2025 Italian Open, she defeated Eva Lys in the second round before losing to Andreescu in the third round. As a last minute entry into the Internationaux de Strasbourg, Rybakina defeated Wang Xinyu, Magda Linette, and No. 9 seed Beatriz Haddad Maia to reach her first final since April 2024. In the final, she defeated eighth seed Liudmila Samsonova in three sets to capture her first title in over a year. Seeded 12th, Rybakina then reached the fourth round of the 2025 French Open, before losing to Iga Świątek in three sets.

Rybakina began her grass season at the WTA 500-level Queen's Club Championships, where she lost in the quarterfinals to the eventual champion, Tatjana Maria. She then reached the quarterfinals of the 2025 Berlin Open, where she lost to Aryna Sabalenka in three sets, despite having four match points. Having reached the semifinals in 2024, Rybakina lost to Clara Tauson in the third round of the 2025 Wimbledon Championships, and subsequently dropped to No 13 in the rankings.

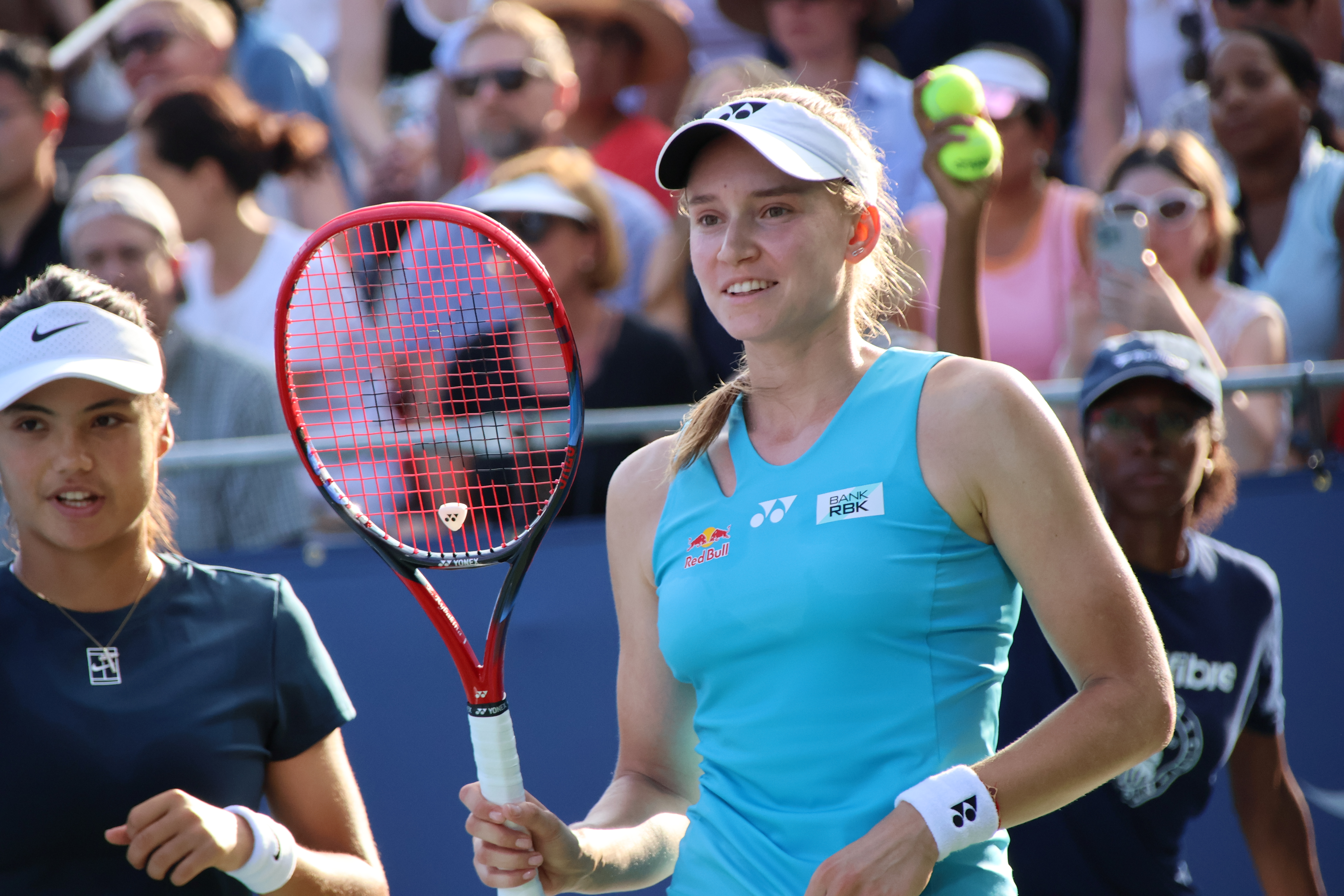
Rybakina at the 2025 DC Open

In July, Rybakina played in the WTA 500-level 2025 DC Open, reaching the semifinals, before losing to eventual champion Leylah Fernandez in a grueling match that lasted over three hours and featured three tiebreaks. She then played in the 2025 National Bank Open in Montreal, Canada, where she again reached the semifinals before losing to wildcard and eventual champion, Victoria Mboko. At the 2025 Cincinnati Open, she defeated world No. 6, Madison Keys, in the fourth round, recording her first win against a top-10 player since February. She then defeated Sabalenka in the quarterfinals, marking her seventh win over a world No. 1 player, before again losing in the semifinals to No. 2 seed and eventual champion, Iga Świątek. Seeded 9th at the 2025 US Open, Rybakina defeated sixteen-year-old wildcard Julieta Pareja, qualifier Tereza Valentová, and doubles partner and former champion Emma Raducanu to reach the fourth round for the first time in her career, where she lost to 2023 Wimbledon Champion Markéta Vondroušová in three sets.

At the WTA 1000-level China Open in September, Rybakina had a first round bye, then defeated Caty McNally in the second round before losing to German player Eva Lys in round three. A few weeks later, at the 1000-level Wuhan Open, Rybakina again had a first round bye, and defeated Jaqueline Cristian and Linda Nosková, before losing in straight sets to Sabalenka in the quarterfinals.

Aiming to qualify for her third straight WTA Finals, Rybakina defeated Dayana Yastremska, qualifier Ajla Tomljanović, No. 2 seed Jasmine Paolini, and No. 4 seed Ekaterina Alexandrova at the 500-level Ningbo Open to earn her second title of the year and tenth overall. She then entered the 500-level Pan Pacific Open, defeating Leylah Fernandez and Victoria Mboko to secure the last remaining spot at the 2025 WTA Finals, before withdrawing from the Tokyo tournament.

In November, at the WTA Finals in Riyadh, despite being the last player to qualify, Rybakina topped 4th-seeded Amanda Anisimova, No. 2 Iga Świątek, and second alternate Ekaterina Alexandrova to reach the semi-finals, going on to defeat fifth seed Jessica Pegula. In the final, she upset Sabalenka to capture the WTA Finals crown, and extend her 11-match win streak. As a result of her undefeated victory, Rybakina earned a record-breaking $5.235 million in prize money, and finished the season as the world No. 5.

=== 2026: Australian and US Open champion, year-end No. 1 ===
Rybakina began her season at the Brisbane International, where she lost in the quarterfinals to Karolína Muchová, ending her 13-match winning streak. She then played in the 2026 Australian Open, defeating Kaja Juvan, Varvara Gracheva, and Tereza Valentová, all in straight sets to reach the fourth round. There, she defeated 21st seeded Elise Mertens to reach her first major quarterfinal since Wimbledon in 2024. She then defeated world No. 2, Iga Świątek in the quarterfinals and Jessica Pegula in the semifinals, having not dropped a set. The final was a rematch of the 2023 Australian Open final and 2025 WTA Finals final against world No. 1, Aryna Sabalenka. She defeated Sabalenka in three sets despite being down a break in the third set, securing her second major title. Unlike her first major win in 2022, Rybakina received 2,000 points as a result of her championship victory, and thus returned to the world No. 3 position for the first time since January 2024.

During the Middle East Swing, she lost to Victoria Mboko in the quarterfinals of the Qatar Ladies Open and retired from her third round match against Antonia Ružić at the Dubai Open due to illness.

At the Indian Wells Open, she defeated fifth seed Jessica Pegula to reach the semifinals. Following her victory in the quarterfinals, she became world No. 2 for the first time in her career. She defeated Elina Svitolina in the semifinals to set up a rematch of the 2023 Indian Wells Open final and 2026 Australian Open final with Sabalenka. Rybakina lost the final in three close sets despite having a championship point in the third set tiebreak.

In the Miami Open, she defeated qualifier Talia Gibson to reach the quarterfinals, setting up rematch of Indian Wells Open quarterfinal with Jessica Pegula. She defeated Pegula in a comeback three-set win to set up a rematch against Aryna Sabalenka in the semifinals, where her run ended after a straight sets loss.

Rybakina began her clay season at the Stuttgart Open as the top seed, receiving a bye in the first round. She then defeated Diana Shnaider in the second round, saved two match points in the quarterfinals in a 3-hour battle against Leylah Fernandez, and defeated Mirra Andreeva in the semi-finals to reach her third final of the year. In the final, she defeated seventh seed Karolína Muchová in straight sets to capture the Stuttgart Open title for the second time in her career.

In Madrid, she defeated Elena-Gabriela Ruse, despite losing the first set and being a break down in the deciding set, and Zheng Qinwen before being stunned in fourth round by lucky loser Anastasia Potapova. She received a bye in the first round of Rome as the second seed. She then defeated Maria Sakkari, Alexandra Eala, and Karolína Plíšková all in straight sets to reach quarterfinals where she lost to Elina Svitolina after she managed to convert only 4 of 20 break points. At the French Open, she was stunned by Yulia Starodubtseva in the second round, marking her earliest loss at the tournament since 2020 and at a major since 2024 Australian Open. Rybakina made 71 unforced errors to Starodubtseva's 36.

Rybakina had an unsuccessful run in grass-court season losing in the quarterfinals of Queen's Club to home favourite Katie Boulter, where she played two matches in a single day and in the second round of the Berlin Open to Alexandra Eala; this was the first time since March 2025 that Rybakina had lost two consecutive matches. At Wimbledon, she defeated Loïs Boisson in three sets, and Caty McNally before losing to Elise Mertens for a second consecutive third-round exit in the tournament, she was able to land just 42 percent of her first serves. Rybakina was also in contention for World No. 1 at the beginning of the tournament.

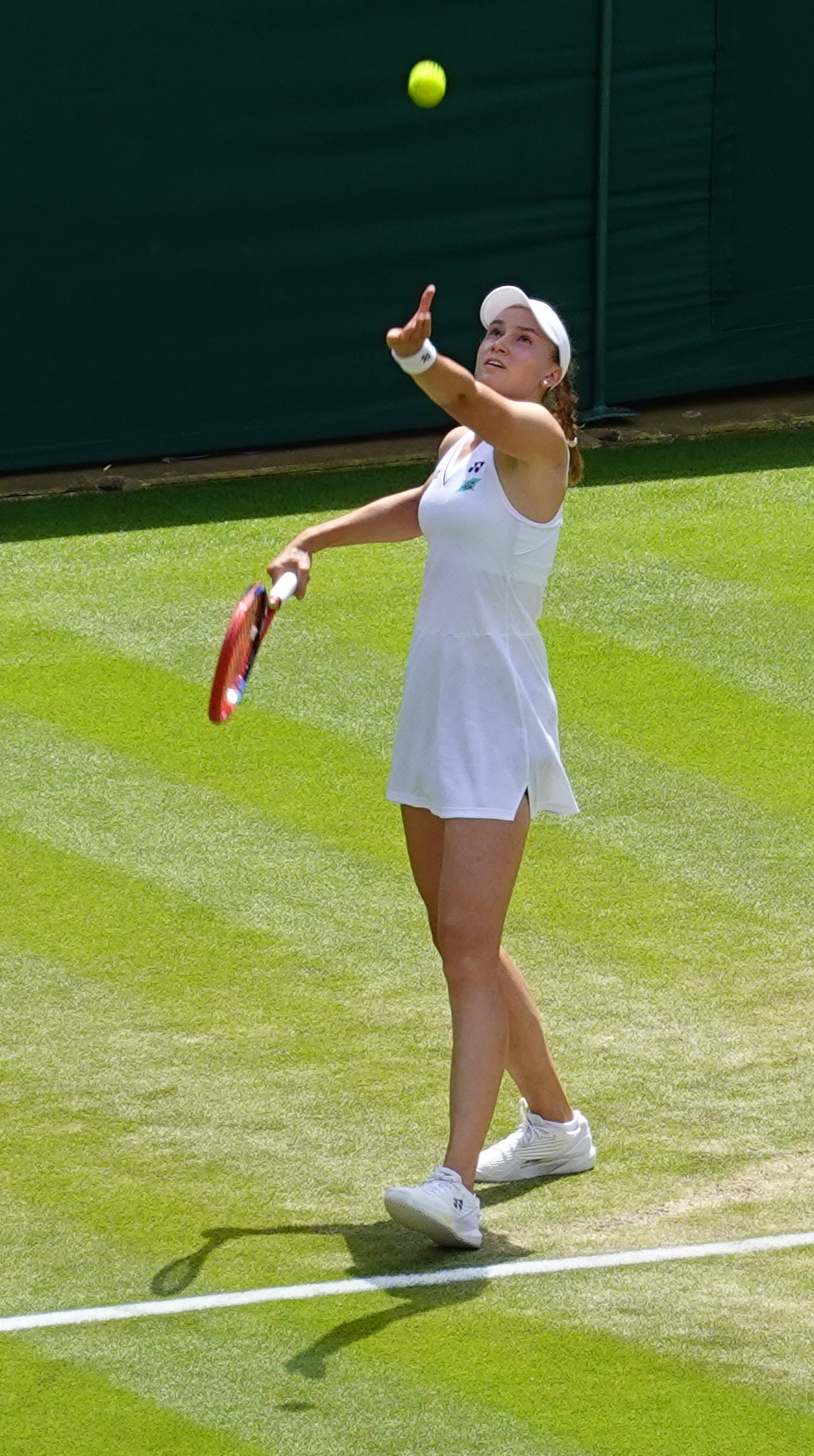
Rybakina at the 2026 Wimbledon Championships

As the second seed, Rybakina received a bye into the second round of the 2026 Canadian Open. She then defeated Daria Kasatkina in three sets hitting equal numbers of unforced erros and winners at 58,Ann Li in straight sets, and made a comeback victory in a thriller against Ludmilla Samsonova from a set down and also two breaks down in third set, to reach the quarterfinal. There, she came back from a set and a break down again against defeating former world No. 1, Naomi Osaka, in a tough three setter to reach her third consecutive semifinal at the tournament. She made another comeback in the semifinal against Coco Gauff from a set down, winning 13 consecutive points in the second set en route to a three set victory in a match that ended at nearly 1:00 AM local time. Contesting her seventh WTA 1000-level final, she lost to Iga Świątek. Rybakina was in contention to become world No. 1 at the beginning of the tournament, however Sabalenka retained the ranking by reaching the fourth round.

At the Cincinnati Open, Rybakina again received a bye as the second seed, and defeated Taylor Townsend, Magdalena Fręch, and 14th seeded Diana Shnaider, all in straight sets, to reach the quarterfinals, setting up a re-match of the previous week's final in Toronto against Iga Świątek. After Sabalenka's fourth-round loss at the tournament, Rybakina needed to reach the final in order to obtain the world-number-one ranking. However, she retired in the first set against Świątek, after sustaining an injury to her left foot.

Rybakina entered the US Open having spent a full week off court due to the injury she sustained in Cincinnati. She defeated wildcard Thea Frodin and Jéssica Bouzas Maneiro to reach the third round, where she defeated Yulia Starodubtseva, to whom she had lost at the French Open earlier in the year. She then reached her first US Open career quarterfinal after a dominant win over former champion Naomi Osaka. After dropping the first set in the quarterfinals to Zheng Qinwen, she produced a comeback win to reach the semifinals and thereby secured the No. 1 spot in the WTA rankings. She became the 30th player to reach number one, the first representing Kazakhstan and the second-oldest first-time No. 1 in WTA history, younger than only Angelique Kerber. She produced another comeback win against Coco Gauff in the semifinal to reach her first US Open final, a rematch against Aryna Sabalenka. In the final, she ended the 19-match US Open winning streak of two-time defending champion Sabalenka to win the third major title of her career and her first US Open title. She became the third player in 21st century after Angelique Kerber and Sabalenka to win both Australian Open and US Open in the same year. She also became the first player to qualify for the WTA Finals following her performance in the tournament. Rybakina later withdrew from the BJK Cup finals due to achilles tendon injury she sustained during the Cincinnati Open, the statement released by KTF also revealed she played through the final matches of the US Open while taking painkillers.

She became the second player after Naomi Osaka to lose her first match after becoming world no. 1, after losing to world no. 118 Alina Charaeva at the China Open, despite being a set and a break up. Following her shock exit in the tournament, she withdrew from the Wuhan Open citing injury.

Rybakina entered the 500-level Ningbo Open as defending champion, where she recorded her first match win as world no 1 after Polina Kudermetova retired in the first set of their round-of-16 match. She then defeated Katarzyna Kawa and Diana Shnaider to reach her 6th final of the year. In the final, she defeated Leylah Fernandez in straight sets to capture her 15th career title and her fourth of the year, the latter of which was the most of any player on tour. It was her first title successful title defense and her title first as world no 1.

The following week, Rybakina arrived in Tokyo just one win away from securing her first year-end no.1 finish. She defeated compatriot Yulia Putintseva in straight sets guaranteeing her the year-end no 1 ranking, and becoming 17th player to do so. She withdrew from the tournament before her next match citing a neck injury.

Entering the WTA Finals in Indian Wells as both the defending champion and no 1 seed, Rybakina participated in the pre-tournament photoshoot before postponing her formal media duties. The following day, Rybakina officially announced her withdrawal from the tournament with a viral illness, stating "I’ve had an incredible season but my body is just not physically ready to compete." A clip was later released by Canal+ Poland in which a visibly unwell Rybakina was attempting to give an interview, but had to stop and leave before she was able to answer a question.

== Playing style ==
With a powerful serve, Rybakina is an aggressive baseliner who aims to finish points quickly, and whose high risk game style leads to an accumulation of both winners and unforced errors. She can generate effortless power, both on groundstrokes and her serve. Her forehand and backhand are both hit flat, with relentless depth and speed, allowing her to generate excellent power with both her groundstrokes, and she can hit winners with both shots. Her serve, which is capable of reaching 127 mph (204 km/h), allows her to serve a large number of aces. She led the tour in the ace count in both 2020, with 193 aces, and in 2025 with 516, when she became the first player since Karolína Plíšková in 2016 to hit over 500 aces in a single season. She had hit 2,513 aces on WTA Tour in her career, the 9th highest ace count on tour since 2008. She also has good movement given her height, although this is one of the few weak areas in her game. Adriano Albanesi, a WTA coach, described her as "a right-handed [Petra] Kvitová". Rybakina plays with a very calm demeanour, and believes she can defeat any opponent.

== Coaches ==
Rybakina hired Andrei Chesnokov, whom she had already trained with at Spartak Tennis Club, to be her private coach in 2018 at the age of 18. This was the first time she had an individual coach. Chesnokov only coached in Moscow and did not travel with her to tournaments. In February 2019, Rybakina switched coaches to Stefano Vukov, a Croatian former tennis player who briefly competed mainly on the ITF Futures tour. With Vukov as her first travelling coach, Rybakina rapidly improved, rising from just inside the top 200 of the WTA rankings into the top 30 in about a year. In November 2024, she announced Goran Ivanišević as her new coach having split from Vukov after that year's US Open. They worked together until her 2025 Australian Open exit.

In January 2025, Rybakina rehired Vukov as an additional coach; he was subsequently suspended by the WTA under a code of conduct investigation, and later banned for 12 months, barring him from gaining accreditation at WTA–sanctioned events. In his absence, Rybakina hired Italian coach and former ATP tour player Davide Sanguinetti. Vukov's ban was removed in August that same year, and he returned to coaching Rybakina. According to the Athletic, Rybakina told several people that "her relationship with [Vukov] had become personal and romantic"; they were said to have shared a hotel room in Melbourne during the Australian Open.

At the end of 2025, Rybakina also added Ukrainian tennis coach and former player Stanislav Khmarskyi to her coaching team.

Rybakina often practices in Bratislava, Slovakia during the European clay swing and grass season for several weeks each year, calling the city her 'second home' in an interview to Slovak Daily.

== Rivalries ==
=== Aryna Sabalenka ===
Rybakina has a prominent rivalry with Aryna Sabalenka, with the pair having faced off in three major finals. They have played each other 18 times since 2019, with Sabalenka leading their overall head-to-head 10–8 whereas Rybakina leads the record in finals 5–2. Both players are known for their aggressive baseline play, resulting in fast-paced and intense matches. The rivalry is considered one of the best of its time.

They faced off in three major finals, the 2023 Australian Open, won by Sabalenka, the 2026 Australian Open, and the 2026 US Open, the latter two both won by Rybakina.

Their other notable encounters include the 2023 Indian Wells Open final, 2024 Madrid Open semifinal, 2025 WTA Finals final, and the 2026 Indian Wells Open final.

=== Iga Świątek ===
Rybakina has also developed a competitive rivalry with Iga Świątek. They have met 14 times since 2021, with Świątek leading their head-to-head at 8–6 in official competitions. Their matches are highly anticipated due to their contrasting playing styles and high rankings. Rybakina had led earlier in their careers before Świątek began to pull ahead. Świątek defeated Rybakina to win her seventh WTA 1000 title at the 2024 Qatar Open. After 4 consecutive defeats to Świątek in 2025, Rybakina came back from a set down to earn her 5th victory against her in the group stage of 2025 WTA Finals in Riyadh. Rybakina would again defeat Świątek, in straight sets, in the quarterfinals of the 2026 Australian Open, which she would eventually win. In August 2026, Świątek defeated Rybakina in straight sets to win the Canadian Open in Toronto, her first WTA tour-level title of 2026.

=== Jessica Pegula ===
Rybakina has also developed a rivalry with Jessica Pegula. Rybakina leads the head-to-head 6–3, all their matchups being on hard courts. Pegula initially lead the rivalry winning three of the first four meetings, including winning their match at the 2023 WTA Finals. However, Rybakina has won all their matchups since then, defeating Pegula in the semifinals of both the 2025 WTA Finals, and the 2026 Australian Open en route to winning the title.

== Endorsements ==
Rybakina has been sponsored by Yonex for clothing and shoes since the 2023 French Open. She had previously been endorsed by Adidas from the start of 2020, and by Nike. She uses a Yonex VCore 100 racket.

From 2023 through 2025 she was sponsored by Red Bull, and has been partnered with Swiss luxury watch manufacturer Vanguart since the beginning of 2026.

On 24 January 2023, Rybakina became an ambassador for Bank RBK. Since September 2024, she has also served as the official brand ambassador for Lexus. As a part of the collaboration, Rybakina teams up with the brand to support the 'Tennis for Life by Lexus' program. She is also sponsored by Kazakhstani company IZI.

Rybakina was ranked as the 9th highest-paid female athlete in 2023. After falling to 15th next year, she made a comeback in the top 10 as 8th highest-paid in 2025 following her win at the 2025 WTA Finals, which earned her the single largest single paycheck in women's sporting history.

== Off the court ==
=== Philanthropy ===
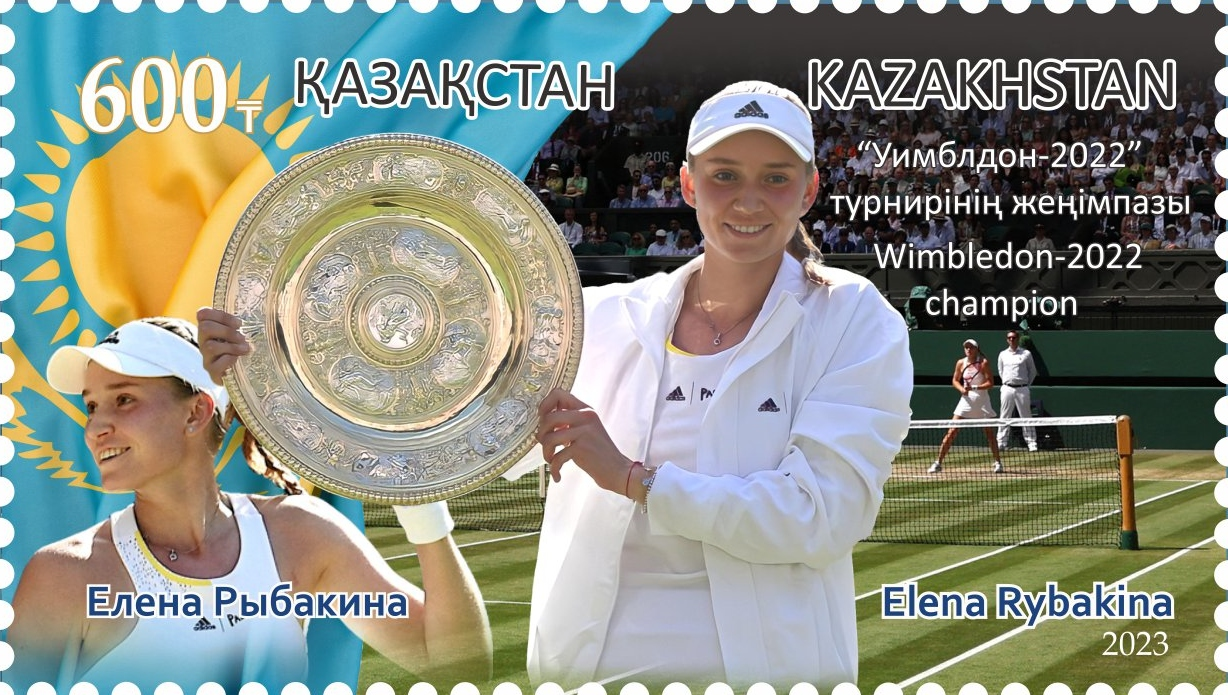
Rybakina on a 2023 stamp of Kazakhstan

Following her 2022 Wimbledon victory, Rybakina announced that she would donate a part of the bonus she received from Kazakhstan Tennis Federation (KTF) to support young tennis players. In March 2023, Rybakina donated ₸35 million to rising female tennis players in Kazakhstan. She also donated money to StopOtlov volunteering movement, which works for animals welfare. KTF President Bulat Utemuratov said in 2026 that Rybakina has two charities in Kazakhstan, one which funds young and promising tennis players, and the other supporting less privileged people.

== Career statistics ==
=== Grand Slam tournament performance timelines ===
Key
**W**	F	SF	QF	#R	RR	Q#	DNQ	A	NH

(W) winner; (F) finalist; (SF) semifinalist; (QF) quarterfinalist; (#R) rounds 4, 3, 2, 1; (RR) round-robin stage; (Q#) qualification round; (DNQ) did not qualify; (A) absent; (NH) not held; (SR) strike rate (events won / competed); (W–L) win–loss record.
To avoid confusion and double counting, these charts are updated at the conclusion of a tournament or when the player's participation has ended.

==== Singles ====
Tournament	2018	2019	2020	2021	2022	2023	2024	2025	2026	SR	W–L	Win %
Australian Open	A	Q1	3R	2R	2R	F	2R	4R	**W**	1 / 7	21–6	78%
French Open	A	1R	2R	QF	3R	3R (Note: Rybakina withdrew before her third round match due to illness, and it is not counted as a loss.)	QF	4R	2R	0 / 8	17–7	71%
Wimbledon	A	Q3	NH	4R	**W**	QF	SF	3R	3R	1 / 6	23–5	82%
US Open	Q2	1R	2R	3R	1R	3R (Note: Rybakina advanced via walkover in her second-round match, and it is not counted as a win.)	2R (Note: Rybakina withdrew before her second-round match due to illness, and it is not counted as a loss.)	4R	**W**	1 / 8	15–6	71%
**Win–loss**	**0–0**	**0–2**	**4–3**	**10–4**	**10–3**	**13–3**	**11–3**	**11–4**	**17–2**	**3 / 29**	**76–24**	**76%**

==== Doubles ====
Tournament	2019	2020	2021	2022	2023	SR	W–L	Win %
Australian Open	A	2R	1R	A	3R	0 / 3	3–3	50%
French Open	A	1R	QF	1R	A	0 / 3	3–3	50%
Wimbledon	A	NH	1R	A	A	0 / 1	0–1	0%
US Open	1R	A	A	A	A	0 / 1	0–1	0%
**Win–loss**	**0–1**	**1–2**	**3–3**	**0–1**	**2–1**	**0 / 8**	**6–8**	**43%**

Note: Rybakina switched federations from Russian to Kazakhstani in June 2018.

=== Grand Slam tournament finals ===
==== Singles: 4 (3 titles, 1 runner-up) ====
Result	Year	Tournament	Surface	Opponent	Score
Win	2022	Wimbledon	Grass	(Tunisia) Ons Jabeur	3–6, 6–2, 6–2
Loss	2023	Australian Open	Hard	Aryna Sabalenka	6–4, 3–6, 4–6
Win	2026	Australian Open	Hard	Aryna Sabalenka	6–4, 4–6, 6–4
Win	2026	US Open	Hard	Aryna Sabalenka	6–4, 5–7, 6–2

=== Year-end championships ===
==== Singles: 1 (title) ====
Result	Year	Tournament	Surface	Opponent	Score
Win	2025	WTA Finals, Saudi Arabia	Hard (i)	Aryna Sabalenka	6–3, 7–6^{(7–0)}

=== Records and achievements ===
==== Open Era records ====
- This record was attained in the Open era of tennis.
- Records in **bold** indicate peer-less achievements.

Tournament	Year accomplished	Since	Record accomplished	Players matched	Reference(s)
**Grand Slam events**	2026	1988	Won both the Australian Open and US Open in the same calendar year	Steffi Graf, Monica Seles, Martina Hingis, Angelique Kerber, Aryna Sabalenka	

== Awards ==
- Order of Friendship (Kazakhstan) II degree – 2022
- Order of Barys (Kazakhstan) III degree – 2026

Rybakina has been granted two state awards by Kazakh President Kassym-Jomart Tokayev; the Order of Friendship (II Degree) winning Wimbledon in July 2022, and the Order of Barys (III Degree) following her victory at the WTA Finals in November 2025, which she was awarded in September of 2026.
