= 2016 Europe Tennis Center Ladies Open – Singles =

Singles
- 2016 Europe Tennis Center Ladies Open

Final
- Champion: (Bulgaria) Elitsa Kostova
- Runner-up: (Bulgaria) Viktoriya Tomova
- Score: 6–0, 7–6^{(7–3)}

Details
- Draw: 32
- Seeds: 8

Events
Singles	Doubles
← 2013 ·	Europe Tennis Center Ladies Open	· 2017 →

This is a new event in the ITF Women's Circuit in 2016.

Elitsa Kostova won the title, defeating Viktoriya Tomova in an all-Bulgarian final, 6–0, 7–6^{(7–3)}.

== Seeds ==
1. (China) Zheng Saisai (first round, retired)
2. (Romania) Patricia Maria Țig (first round, retired)
3. (Switzerland) Viktorija Golubic (first round)
4. (Slovakia) Kristína Kučová (second round)
5. (Sweden) Rebecca Peterson (quarterfinals)
6. (Switzerland) ~~Romina Oprandi~~ (withdrew)
7. (Austria) Barbara Haas (second round)
8. (United States) Jessica Pegula (first round)

== Main draw ==
=== Key ===
- Q = Qualifier
- WC = Wild card
- LL = Lucky loser
- Alt = Alternate
- SE = Special exempt
- PR = Protected ranking
- ITF = ITF entry
- JE = Junior exempt
- w/o = Walkover
- r = Retired
- d = Defaulted
- SR = Special ranking

=== Finals ===
Semifinals
(Bulgaria) Elitsa Kostova	3	6	6
WC	(Hungary) Fanny Stollár	6	2	3
(Bulgaria) Viktoriya Tomova	6	6
(Romania) Nicoleta Dascălu	4	4

Final
(Bulgaria) Elitsa Kostova	6	7^{7}
(Bulgaria) Viktoriya Tomova	0	6^{3}

=== Top half ===
First round
1	(China) S Zheng	6	6^{3}	0^{r}
(Bulgaria) S Karatantcheva	3	7^{7}	2
(Romania) A Cadanțu	1	5
(Bulgaria) E Kostova	6	7
(Georgia (country)) E Gorgodze	4	7^{7}	6
WC	(Hungary) Á Bukta	6	6^{1}	4
(Liechtenstein) K von Deichmann	3	1
7	(Austria) B Haas	6	6
4	(Slovakia) K Kučová	3	6	6
(Hungary) RL Jani	6	1	3
Q	(Italy) M Di Giuseppe	6^{5}	0
(Serbia) J Jakšić	7^{7}	6
Q	(Russia) E Yashina	3	2
WC	(Hungary) F Stollár	6	6
(Spain) G García Pérez	6	6
LL	(Georgia (country)) S Kvatsabaia	2	4

Second round
(Bulgaria) S Karatantcheva	4	2
(Bulgaria) E Kostova	6	6
(Georgia (country)) E Gorgodze	7	6
7	(Austria) B Haas	5	1
4	(Slovakia) K Kučová	3	3
(Serbia) J Jakšić	6	6
WC	(Hungary) F Stollár	6	5	6
(Spain) G García Pérez	2	7	3

Quarterfinals
(Bulgaria) E Kostova	6	6
(Georgia (country)) E Gorgodze	1	1
(Serbia) J Jakšić	0	1
WC	(Hungary) F Stollár	6	6

Semifinals
(Bulgaria) E Kostova	3	6	6
WC	(Hungary) F Stollár	6	2	3

=== Bottom half ===
First round
5	(Sweden) R Peterson	6	6
WC	(Slovakia) T Mihalíková	1	2
(Czech Republic) J Malečková	6	6
Q	(Bosnia and Herzegovina) E Burgić Bucko	3	3
(Belarus) A Sabalenka	6	6^{5}	6
(Ukraine) O Ianchuk	3	7^{7}	4
(Bulgaria) V Tomova	6	7^{7}
3/WC	(Switzerland) V Golubic	1	6^{3}
8	(United States) J Pegula	4	2
(Liechtenstein) S Vogt	6	6
(Romania) C Dinu	6	6
(Bulgaria) D Evtimova	0	4
(Hungary) D Gálfi	3	7^{7}	6^{5}
(Romania) N Dascălu	6	6^{3}	7^{7}
Q	(Ukraine) A Vasylyeva	0
2	(Romania) PM Țig	3^{r}

Second round
5	(Sweden) R Peterson	7	7
(Czech Republic) J Malečková	5	5
(Belarus) A Sabalenka	6^{4}	4
(Bulgaria) V Tomova	7^{7}	6
(Liechtenstein) S Vogt	6^{5}	6	3
(Romania) C Dinu	7^{7}	4	6
(Romania) N Dascălu	6	7
Q	(Ukraine) A Vasylyeva	1	5

Quarterfinals
5	(Sweden) R Peterson	3	6	3
(Bulgaria) V Tomova	6	3	6
(Romania) C Dinu	3	3
(Romania) N Dascălu	6	6

Semifinals
(Bulgaria) V Tomova	6	6
(Romania) N Dascălu	4	4
