= 2019 Hungarian Ladies Open =

- Date: 18 – 24 February
- Edition: 22nd
- Category: International
- Surface: Hard (indoor)
- Location: Budapest, Hungary
- Venue: SYMA Sports and Conference Centre

Champions

Singles
- (Belgium) Alison Van Uytvanck

Doubles
- (Russia) Ekaterina Alexandrova / (Russia) Vera Zvonareva
← 2018 ·	Hungarian Ladies Open	· 2020 →

The 2019 Hungarian Ladies Open was a tennis tournament played on indoor hard courts. It was the 22nd edition of the Hungarian Ladies Open and an International-level tournament on the 2019 WTA Tour.

== Points and prize money ==
=== Point distribution ===
Event	W	F	SF	QF	Round of 16	Round of 32	Q	Q2	Q1
Singles	280	180	110	60	30	1	18	12	1
Doubles	280	180	110	60	1	—	—	—	—

=== Prize money ===
Event	W	F	SF	QF	Round of 16	Round of 32	Q2	Q1
Women's singles	$43,000	$21,400	$11,500	$6,175	$3,400	$2,100	$1,020	$600
Women's doubles	$12,300	$6,400	$3,435	$1,820	$960	—	—	—

== Singles main draw entrants ==
=== Seeds ===
Country	Player	Rank^{1}	Seed
BEL	Alison Van Uytvanck	50	1
~~BEL~~	~~Kirsten Flipkens~~	~~53~~	~~2~~
FRA	Pauline Parmentier	55	3
SRB	Aleksandra Krunić	57	4
RUS	Ekaterina Alexandrova	65	5
GER	Andrea Petkovic	68	6
SWE	Johanna Larsson	71	7
CZE	Markéta Vondroušová	72	8

- ^{1} Rankings are as of 11 February 2019

=== Other entrants ===
The following players received wildcards into the main draw:

- (Hungary) Anna Bondár
- (Croatia) Ana Konjuh
- (Hungary) Fanny Stollár

The following players received entry from the qualifying draw:

- (Hungary) Gréta Arn
- (Belgium) Ysaline Bonaventure
- (Spain) Georgina García Pérez
- (Czech Republic) Tereza Smitková
- (Poland) Iga Świątek
- (Russia) Natalia Vikhlyantseva

The following player received entry as a lucky loser:

- (Bulgaria) Viktoriya Tomova

=== Withdrawals ===
Before the tournament

- (Belgium) Kirsten Flipkens → replaced by (Bulgaria) Viktoriya Tomova
- (Russia) Margarita Gasparyan → replaced by (Ukraine) Kateryna Kozlova
- (Germany) Tatjana Maria → replaced by (Russia) Anna Blinkova
- (Slovakia) Magdaléna Rybáriková → replaced by (Serbia) Olga Danilović
- (Slovakia) Anna Karolína Schmiedlová → replaced by (France) Fiona Ferro

== Doubles main draw entrants ==
=== Seeds ===
Country	Player	Country	Player	Rank^{1}	Seed
~~BEL~~	~~Kirsten Flipkens~~	~~SWE~~	~~Johanna Larsson~~	~~70~~	~~1~~
ROU	Irina-Camelia Begu	KAZ	Galina Voskoboeva	100	2
HUN	Fanny Stollár	GBR	Heather Watson	123	3
AUS	Jessica Moore	RUS	Alexandra Panova	137	4

- ^{1} Rankings are as of 11 February 2019

=== Other entrants ===
The following pairs received wildcards into the doubles main draw:

- (Hungary) Anna Bondár / (Hungary) Dalma Gálfi
- (Hungary) Reka-Luca Jani / (Sweden) Cornelia Lister

=== Withdrawals ===
- (Belgium) Kirsten Flipkens (viral illness)

== Champions ==
=== Singles ===
- (Belgium) Alison Van Uytvanck def. (Czech Republic) Markéta Vondroušová 1–6, 7–5, 6–2

=== Doubles ===
- (Russia) Ekaterina Alexandrova / (Russia) Vera Zvonareva def. (Hungary) Fanny Stollár / (United Kingdom) Heather Watson, 6–4, 4–6, [10–7]
