= 2018 Hungarian Ladies Open =

- Date: 19 – 25 February
- Edition: 21st
- Category: International
- Surface: Hard (indoor)
- Location: Budapest, Hungary
- Venue: SYMA Sports and Conference Centre

Champions

Singles
- (Belgium) Alison Van Uytvanck

Doubles
- (Spain) Georgina García Pérez / (Hungary) Fanny Stollár
← 2017 ·	Hungarian Ladies Open	· 2019 →

The 2018 Hungarian Ladies Open was a tennis tournament played on indoor hard courts. It was the 21st edition of the Hungarian Ladies Open, an International-level tournament on the 2018 WTA Tour.

== Singles main draw entrants ==
=== Seeds ===
Country	Player	Rank^{1}	Seed
SVK	Dominika Cibulková	30	1
CHN	Zhang Shuai	34	2
HUN	Tímea Babos	35	3
ROU	Sorana Cîrstea	38	4
ROU	Mihaela Buzărnescu	43	5
BLR	Aliaksandra Sasnovich	46	6
SRB	Aleksandra Krunić	47	7
CRO	Donna Vekić	50	8

- ^{1} Rankings are as of 12 February 2018

=== Other entrants ===
The following players received wildcards into the main draw:

- (Germany) Antonia Lottner
- (Hungary) Fanny Stollár
- (Hungary) Panna Udvardy

The following player received entry using a protected ranking:

- (Germany) Sabine Lisicki

The following players received entry from the qualifying draw:

- (Belgium) Ysaline Bonaventure
- (Slovakia) Jana Čepelová
- (Poland) Magdalena Fręch
- (Spain) Georgina García Pérez
- (Australia) Arina Rodionova
- (Italy) Roberta Vinci

The following player received entry as a lucky loser:

- (Slovakia) Viktória Kužmová

=== Withdrawals ===
Before the tournament

- (Switzerland) Timea Bacsinszky → replaced by (France) Océane Dodin
- (Germany) Anna-Lena Friedsam → replaced by (Ukraine) Kateryna Kozlova
- (Russia) Margarita Gasparyan → replaced by (France) Pauline Parmentier
- (Poland) Magda Linette → replaced by (Romania) Monica Niculescu
- (Czech Republic) Kristýna Plíšková → replaced by (Slovakia) Viktória Kužmová
- (Slovakia) Magdaléna Rybáriková → replaced by (Spain) Lara Arruabarrena

== Doubles main draw entrants ==
=== Seeds ===
Country	Player	Country	Player	Rank^{1}	Seed
BEL	Kirsten Flipkens	SWE	Johanna Larsson	71	1
GBR	Anna Smith	CZE	Renata Voráčová	82	2
RUS	Natela Dzalamidze	GEO	Oksana Kalashnikova	127	3
NED	Lesley Kerkhove	BLR	Lidziya Marozava	128	4

- ^{1} Rankings are as of 12 February 2018

=== Other entrants ===
The following pairs received wildcards into the doubles main draw:

- (Hungary) Anna Bondár / (Hungary) Ágnes Bukta
- (Hungary) Dalma Gálfi / (Hungary) Panna Udvardy

== Champions ==
=== Singles ===
- (Belgium) Alison Van Uytvanck def. (Slovakia) Dominika Cibulková, 6–3, 3–6, 7–5

=== Doubles ===
- (Spain) Georgina García Pérez / (Hungary) Fanny Stollár def. (Belgium) Kirsten Flipkens / (Sweden) Johanna Larsson, 4–6, 6–4, [10–3]
