= 2016 Europe Tennis Center Ladies Open =

- Date: 4–10 July
- Edition: 19th
- Category: ITF Women's Circuit
- Prize money: $100,000
- Surface: Clay / outdoor
- Location: Budapest, Hungary

Champions

Singles
- (Bulgaria) Elitsa Kostova

Doubles
- (Bosnia and Herzegovina) Ema Burgić Bucko / (Spain) Georgina García Pérez
- Hungarian Ladies Open

The 2016 Europe Tennis Center Ladies Open was a professional tennis tournament played on outdoor clay courts. It was the 19th edition of the Budapest Grand Prix tournament and part of the 2016 ITF Women's Circuit, offering a total of $100,000 in prize money. It took place in Budapest, Hungary, from 4 to 10 July 2016.

== Singles main draw entrants ==
=== Seeds ===
Country	Player	Rank^{1}	Seed
CHN	Zheng Saisai	79	1
ROU	Patricia Maria Țig	100	2
SUI	Viktorija Golubic	108	3
SVK	Kristína Kučová	118	4
SWE	Rebecca Peterson	132	5
~~SUI~~	~~Romina Oprandi~~	~~136~~	~~6~~
AUT	Barbara Haas	152	7
USA	Jessica Pegula	170	8

- ^{1} Rankings as of 27 June 2016.

=== Other entrants ===
The following player received a wildcard into the singles main draw:

- (Hungary) Ágnes Bukta
- (Switzerland) Viktorija Golubic
- (Slovakia) Tereza Mihalíková
- (Hungary) Fanny Stollár

The following players received entry from the qualifying draw:

- (Bosnia and Herzegovina) Ema Burgić Bucko
- (Italy) Martina Di Giuseppe
- (Ukraine) Anastasiya Vasylyeva
- (Russia) Ekaterina Yashina

The following player received entry by a lucky loser spot:

- (Georgia (country)) Sofia Kvatsabaia

== Champions ==
=== Singles ===
- (Bulgaria) Elitsa Kostova def. (Bulgaria) Viktoriya Tomova, 6–0, 7–6^{(7–3)}

=== Doubles ===
- (Bosnia and Herzegovina) Ema Burgić Bucko / (Spain) Georgina García Pérez def. (Czech Republic) Lenka Kunčíková / (Czech Republic) Karolína Stuchlá, 6–4, 2–6, [12–10]
