= 2018 Hungarian Ladies Open – Singles =

Singles
- 2018 Hungarian Ladies Open

Final
- Champion: (Belgium) Alison Van Uytvanck
- Runner-up: (Slovakia) Dominika Cibulková
- Score: 6–3, 3–6, 7–5

Details
- Seeds: 8

Events
Singles	Doubles
- Hungarian Ladies Open

Tímea Babos was the defending champion, but lost in the second round to Mona Barthel.

Unseeded Alison Van Uytvanck won the title, defeating Dominika Cibulková in the final, 6–3, 3–6, 7–5.

== Seeds ==
1. (Slovakia) Dominika Cibulková (final)
2. (China) Zhang Shuai (quarterfinals)
3. (Hungary) Tímea Babos (second round)
4. (Romania) Sorana Cîrstea (first round)
5. (Romania) Mihaela Buzărnescu (second round)
6. (Belarus) Aliaksandra Sasnovich (second round)
7. (Serbia) Aleksandra Krunić (second round)
8. (Croatia) Donna Vekić (second round)

== Draw ==
Key

- Q = Qualifier
- WC = Wild card
- LL = Lucky loser
- Alt = Alternate
- ITF = ITF entry
- PR = Protected ranking
- SR = Special ranking
- SE = Special exempt
- JE = Junior exempt
- JR = Junior Accelerator Programme entrant
- CO = College Accelerator Programme entrant
- NG = Next Gen Accelerator Program entrant
- w/o = Walkover
- r = Retired
- d = Defaulted

=== Finals ===
Semifinals
1	(Slovakia) Dominika Cibulková	6	6
(Germany) Mona Barthel	3	2
LL	(Slovakia) Viktória Kužmová	4	2
(Belgium) Alison Van Uytvanck	6	6

Final
1	(Slovakia) Dominika Cibulková	3	6	5
(Belgium) Alison Van Uytvanck	6	3	7

=== Top half ===
First round
1	(Slovakia) D Cibulková	6	6
WC	(Hungary) F Stollár	3	3
(Romania) M Niculescu	3	5
(Belgium) K Flipkens	6	7
(Sweden) J Larsson	6	7^{7}
Q	(Poland) M Fręch	1	6^{5}
Q	(Spain) G García Pérez	2	4
7	(Serbia) A Krunić	6	6
3	(Hungary) T Babos	6	6
(Germany) T Maria	1	0
(Germany) M Barthel	7^{7}	5	6
(Ukraine) K Kozlova	6^{3}	7	0
Q	(Belgium) Y Bonaventure	6	6
(Spain) S Sorribes Tormo	0	0
WC	(Hungary) P Udvardy	3	3
8	(Croatia) D Vekić	6	6

Second round
1	(Slovakia) D Cibulková	6	6
(Belgium) K Flipkens	4	2
(Sweden) J Larsson	6	6
7	(Serbia) A Krunić	3	1
3	(Hungary) T Babos	4	6	3
(Germany) M Barthel	6	4	6
Q	(Belgium) Y Bonaventure	6	6
8	(Croatia) D Vekić	4	1

Quarterfinals
1	(Slovakia) D Cibulková	6	6
(Sweden) J Larsson	3	2
(Germany) M Barthel	6	6
Q	(Belgium) Y Bonaventure	3	4

Semifinals
1	(Slovakia) D Cibulková	6	6
(Germany) M Barthel	3	2

=== Bottom half ===
First round
6	(Belarus) A Sasnovich	6	6
Q	(Italy) R Vinci	3	3
WC	(Germany) A Lottner	4	2
(Croatia) P Martić	6	6
(France) P Parmentier	6	4	2
PR	(Germany) S Lisicki	0	6	6
LL	(Slovakia) V Kužmová	6	6
4	(Romania) S Cîrstea	4	2
5	(Romania) M Buzărnescu	7^{7}	6
(Spain) L Arruabarrena	6^{5}	1
(France) O Dodin	3	2
(Belgium) A Van Uytvanck	6	6
Q	(Slovakia) J Čepelová	6	6
(Germany) C Witthöft	2	2
Q	(Australia) Ar Rodionova	3	2
2	(China) S Zhang	6	6

Second round
6	(Belarus) A Sasnovich	6	4	4
(Croatia) P Martić	3	6	6
PR	(Germany) S Lisicki	2	4
LL	(Slovakia) V Kužmová	6	6
5	(Romania) M Buzărnescu	1	0
(Belgium) A Van Uytvanck	6	6
Q	(Slovakia) J Čepelová	6	6^{4}	3
2	(China) S Zhang	2	7^{7}	6

Quarterfinals
(Croatia) P Martić	4	2
LL	(Slovakia) V Kužmová	6	6
(Belgium) A Van Uytvanck	6	6
2	(China) S Zhang	2	4

Semifinals
LL	(Slovakia) V Kužmová	4	2
(Belgium) A Van Uytvanck	6	6

== Qualifying ==
=== Seeds ===
1. (Czech Republic) Denisa Allertová (first round)
2. (Slovakia) Jana Čepelová (qualified)
3. (Slovakia) Viktória Kužmová (qualifying competition, lucky loser)
4. (United Kingdom) Naomi Broady (first round)
5. (Belarus) Vera Lapko (qualifying competition)
6. (Slovakia) Anna Karolína Schmiedlová (first round)
7. (China) Han Xinyun (first round)
8. (Australia) Arina Rodionova (qualified)
9. (Bulgaria) Viktoriya Tomova (first round)
10. (Poland) Magdalena Fręch (qualified)
11. (Russia) Anna Kalinskaya (first round)
12. (Switzerland) Patty Schnyder (qualifying competition)

=== Qualifiers ===
1. (Poland) Magdalena Fręch
2. (Slovakia) Jana Čepelová
3. (Belgium) Ysaline Bonaventure
4. (Spain) Georgina García Pérez
5. (Italy) Roberta Vinci
6. (Australia) Arina Rodionova

=== Lucky loser ===
1. (Slovakia) Viktória Kužmová

=== Draw ===
==== First qualifier ====
First round
1	(Czech Republic) Denisa Allertová	4	5
(Russia) Anna Blinkova	6	7
(Turkey) Çağla Büyükakçay	2	6	5
10	(Poland) Magdalena Fręch	6	4	7

Qualifying competition
(Russia) Anna Blinkova	4	1
10	(Poland) Magdalena Fręch	6	6

==== Second qualifier ====
First round
2	(Slovakia) Jana Čepelová	7^{7}	4	7^{7}
WC	(Hungary) Dalma Gálfi	6^{4}	6	6^{3}
(Germany) Tamara Korpatsch	6	6
9	(Bulgaria) Viktoriya Tomova	4	3

Qualifying competition
2	(Slovakia) Jana Čepelová	6	7^{7}
(Germany) Tamara Korpatsch	2	6^{4}

==== Third qualifier ====
First round
3	(Slovakia) Viktória Kužmová	7^{7}	6
WC	(Hungary) Anna Bondár	6^{5}	1
(Belgium) Ysaline Bonaventure	7^{7}	6
7	(China) Han Xinyun	6^{4}	0

Qualifying competition
3	(Slovakia) Viktória Kužmová	7^{10}	6^{4}	3
(Belgium) Ysaline Bonaventure	6^{8}	7^{7}	6

==== Fourth qualifier ====
First round
4	(United Kingdom) Naomi Broady	6	5	3
(Spain) Georgina García Pérez	3	7	6
WC	(Slovenia) Kaja Juvan	6^{9}	6	3
12	(Switzerland) Patty Schnyder	7^{11}	4	6

Qualifying competition
(Spain) Georgina García Pérez	5	6	6
12	(Switzerland) Patty Schnyder	7	3	2

==== Fifth qualifier ====
First round
5	(Belarus) Vera Lapko	6	4	6
(Netherlands) Lesley Kerkhove	2	6	3
(Italy) Roberta Vinci	3	6	7^{7}
11	(Russia) Anna Kalinskaya	6	4	6^{3}

Qualifying competition
5	(Belarus) Vera Lapko	1	7^{8}	3
(Italy) Roberta Vinci	6	6^{6}	6

==== Sixth qualifier ====
First round
6	(Slovakia) Anna Karolína Schmiedlová	2	2
(Italy) Jasmine Paolini	6	6
WC	(Russia) Sofya Lansere	0	2
8	(Australia) Arina Rodionova	6	6

Qualifying competition
(Italy) Jasmine Paolini	2	1
8	(Australia) Arina Rodionova	6	6
