= 2016 Europe Tennis Center Ladies Open – Doubles =

New event in the ITF Women's Circuit in 2016

Doubles
- 2016 Europe Tennis Center Ladies Open

Final
- Champions: (Bosnia and Herzegovina) Ema Burgić Bucko (Spain) Georgina García Pérez
- Runners-up: (Czech Republic) Lenka Kunčíková (Czech Republic) Karolína Stuchlá
- Score: 6–4, 2–6, [12–10]

Events
| Singles | Doubles |
| ← 2013 · | Europe Tennis Center Ladies Open | · 2017 → |

This was a new event in the ITF Women's Circuit in 2016.

Ema Burgić Bucko and Georgina García Pérez won the title, defeating Lenka Kunčíková and Karolína Stuchlá in the final, 6–4, 2–6, [12–10].

== Seeds ==
1. (Switzerland) Viktorija Golubic / (Liechtenstein) Stephanie Vogt (semifinals)
2. (Czech Republic) Lenka Kunčíková / (Czech Republic) Karolína Stuchlá (final)
3. (Hungary) Réka Luca Jani / (Belarus) Lidziya Marozava (quarterfinals)
4. (Romania) Elena Bogdan / (Thailand) Varatchaya Wongteanchai (first round)

== Draw ==
=== Key ===
- Q = Qualifier
- WC = Wild card
- LL = Lucky loser
- Alt = Alternate
- SE = Special exempt
- PR = Protected ranking
- ITF = ITF entry
- JE = Junior exempt
- w/o = Walkover
- r = Retired
- d = Defaulted
- SR = Special ranking

First round
1 | (Switzerland) V Golubic (Liechtenstein) S Vogt | 6 | 6
(Belarus) A Sabalenka (Hungary) R Stolmár | 3 | 4
(Hungary) D Gálfi (Russia) E Yashina | 1 | 2
(United States) J Pegula (Hungary) F Stollár | 6 | 6
3 | (Hungary) RL Jani (Belarus) L Marozava | 6 | 6
(Czech Republic) K Hrabalová (Czech Republic) S Machalová | 1 | 2
(Bosnia and Herzegovina) E Burgić Bucko (Spain) G García Pérez | 6 | 6
(Romania) C Dinu (Serbia) J Jakšić | 1 | 1
(Georgia (country)) E Gorgodze (Georgia (country)) S Kvatsabaia | 6 | 6
WC | (Hungary) A Nagy (Hungary) T Visontai | 4 | 0
(Hungary) Á Bukta (Slovakia) V Juhászová | 6^{10} | 6 | [10]
4 | (Romania) E Bogdan (Thailand) V Wongteanchai | 7^{12} | 4 | [6]
(Ukraine) O Ianchuk (Russia) A Pribylova | 6 | 7
(Romania) A Cadanțu (Bulgaria) D Evtimova | 2 | 5
(Bulgaria) E Kostova (Ukraine) A Vasylyeva | 6 | 0 | [6]
2 | (Czech Republic) L Kunčíková (Czech Republic) K Stuchlá | 4 | 6 | [10]

Quarterfinals
1 | (Switzerland) V Golubic (Liechtenstein) S Vogt | 0 | 6 | [13]
(United States) J Pegula (Hungary) F Stollár | 6 | 3 | [11]
3 | (Hungary) RL Jani (Belarus) L Marozava | 1 | 4
(Bosnia and Herzegovina) E Burgić Bucko (Spain) G García Pérez | 6 | 6
(Georgia (country)) E Gorgodze (Georgia (country)) S Kvatsabaia | 7 | 7
(Hungary) Á Bukta (Slovakia) V Juhászová | 5 | 5
(Ukraine) O Ianchuk (Russia) A Pribylova | 3 | 0
2 | (Czech Republic) L Kunčíková (Czech Republic) K Stuchlá | 6 | 6

Semifinals
1 | (Switzerland) V Golubic (Liechtenstein) S Vogt | 3 | 2
(Bosnia and Herzegovina) E Burgić Bucko (Spain) G García Pérez | 6 | 6
(Georgia (country)) E Gorgodze (Georgia (country)) S Kvatsabaia | 3 | 1
2 | (Czech Republic) L Kunčíková (Czech Republic) K Stuchlá | 6 | 6

Final
(Bosnia and Herzegovina) E Burgić Bucko (Spain) G García Pérez | 6 | 2 | [12]
2 | (Czech Republic) L Kunčíková (Czech Republic) K Stuchlá | 4 | 6 | [10]
