= 2019 Hungarian Ladies Open – Singles =

Singles
- 2019 Hungarian Ladies Open

Final
- Champion: (Belgium) Alison Van Uytvanck
- Runner-up: (Czech Republic) Markéta Vondroušová
- Score: 1–6, 7–5, 6–2

Details
- Seeds: 8

Events
Singles	Doubles
- Hungarian Ladies Open

Alison Van Uytvanck was the defending champion and successfully defended her title, defeating Markéta Vondroušová in the final, 1–6, 7–5, 6–2. Van Uytvanck saved five match points in her semifinal match against Ekaterina Alexandrova.

== Seeds ==
1. (Belgium) Alison Van Uytvanck (champion)
2. (Belgium) Kirsten Flipkens (withdrew)
3. (France) Pauline Parmentier (quarterfinals)
4. (Serbia) Aleksandra Krunić (second round)
5. (Russia) Ekaterina Alexandrova (semifinals)
6. (Germany) Andrea Petkovic (second round)
7. (Sweden) Johanna Larsson (first round)
8. (Czech Republic) Markéta Vondroušová (final)

== Draw ==
Key

- Q = Qualifier
- WC = Wild card
- LL = Lucky loser
- Alt = Alternate
- ITF = ITF entry
- PR = Protected ranking
- SR = Special ranking
- SE = Special exempt
- JE = Junior exempt
- JR = Junior Accelerator Programme entrant
- CO = College Accelerator Programme entrant
- NG = Next Gen Accelerator Program entrant
- w/o = Walkover
- r = Retired
- d = Defaulted

=== Finals ===
Semifinals
1	(Belgium) Alison Van Uytvanck	3	6	7^{9}
5	(Russia) Ekaterina Alexandrova	6	4	6^{7}
(Russia) Anastasia Potapova	0	2
8	(Czech Republic) Markéta Vondroušová	6	6

Final
1	(Belgium) Alison Van Uytvanck	1	7	6
8	(Czech Republic) Markéta Vondroušová	6	5	2

=== Top half ===
First round
1	(Belgium) A Van Uytvanck	7	7
(Russia) V Zvonareva	5	5
(Serbia) O Danilović	3	0
Q	(Poland) I Świątek	6	6
WC	(Hungary) F Stollár	3	3
(United States) M Brengle	6	6
(Ukraine) K Kozlova	6	6
7	(Sweden) J Larsson	1	1
3	(France) P Parmentier	7	6
WC	(Croatia) A Konjuh	5	3
Q	(Czech Republic) T Smitková	4	6	6
Q	(Belgium) Y Bonaventure	6	3	2
(Netherlands) A Rus	7	6
(France) F Ferro	5	3
Q	(Hungary) G Arn	6	1	4
5	(Russia) E Alexandrova	4	6	6

Second round
1	(Belgium) A Van Uytvanck	6	7
Q	(Poland) I Świątek	4	5
(United States) M Brengle	0	1
(Ukraine) K Kozlova	6	6
3	(France) P Parmentier	6	7
Q	(Czech Republic) T Smitková	1	5
(Netherlands) A Rus	4	0
5	(Russia) E Alexandrova	6	6

Quarterfinals
1	(Belgium) A Van Uytvanck	3	6	6
(Ukraine) K Kozlova	6	1	4
3	(France) P Parmentier	3	2
5	(Russia) E Alexandrova	6	6

Semifinals
1	(Belgium) A Van Uytvanck	3	6	7^{9}
5	(Russia) E Alexandrova	6	4	6^{7}

=== Bottom half ===
First round
6	(Germany) A Petkovic	6	6
(Romania) A Bogdan	1	0
(Russia) A Potapova	6	2	7^{7}
(United Kingdom) H Watson	4	6	6^{4}
(Romania) S Cîrstea	4	6	6
WC	(Hungary) A Bondár	6	3	4
(Germany) T Korpatsch	0	5
4	(Serbia) A Krunić	6	7
8	(Czech Republic) M Vondroušová	6	7^{8}
Q	(Spain) G García Pérez	0	6^{6}
(Russia) A Blinkova	3	6	6
Q	(Russia) N Vikhlyantseva	6	4	4
(Germany) M Barthel	6	4	2
(Romania) I-C Begu	3	6	6
(Russia) E Rodina	6	4	6
LL	(Bulgaria) V Tomova	0	6	2

Second round
6	(Germany) A Petkovic	2	5
(Russia) A Potapova	6	7
(Romania) S Cîrstea	6	6
4	(Serbia) A Krunić	3	3
8	(Czech Republic) M Vondroušová	7^{8}	3	6
(Russia) A Blinkova	6^{6}	6	3
(Romania) I-C Begu	6	6
(Russia) E Rodina	2	3

Quarterfinals
(Russia) A Potapova	6	6^{5}	7
(Romania) S Cîrstea	4	7^{7}	5
8	(Czech Republic) M Vondroušová	5	6	6
(Romania) I-C Begu	7	1	3

Semifinals
(Russia) A Potapova	0	2
8	(Czech Republic) M Vondroušová	6	6

== Qualifying ==
=== Seeds ===
1. (Russia) Natalia Vikhlyantseva (qualified)
2. (Belgium) Ysaline Bonaventure (qualified)
3. (Spain) Paula Badosa Gibert (qualifying competition)
4. (Czech Republic) Tereza Smitková (qualified)
5. (Poland) Iga Świątek (qualified)
6. (Australia) Priscilla Hon (first round)
7. (Russia) Anna Kalinskaya (first round)
8. (Switzerland) Conny Perrin (first round)
9. (Georgia (country)) Ekaterine Gorgodze (first round)
10. (Czech Republic) Tereza Martincová (qualifying competition)
11. (Switzerland) Jil Teichmann (qualifying competition)
12. (Bulgaria) Viktoriya Tomova (qualifying competition, lucky loser)

=== Qualifiers ===
1. (Russia) Natalia Vikhlyantseva
2. (Belgium) Ysaline Bonaventure
3. (Hungary) Gréta Arn
4. (Czech Republic) Tereza Smitková
5. (Poland) Iga Świątek
6. (Spain) Georgina García Pérez

=== Lucky loser ===
1. (Bulgaria) Viktoriya Tomova

=== Draw ===
==== First qualifier ====
First round
1	(Russia) Natalia Vikhlyantseva	4	6	7
WC	(Hungary) Dalma Gálfi	6	1	5
(Australia) Arina Rodionova	6	5	6
7	(Russia) Anna Kalinskaya	0	7	4

Qualifying competition
1	(Russia) Natalia Vikhlyantseva	6^{7}	6	7^{7}
(Australia) Arina Rodionova	7^{9}	2	6^{5}

==== Second qualifier ====
First round
2	(Belgium) Ysaline Bonaventure	6	3	6
(Kazakhstan) Elena Rybakina	2	6	2
(Netherlands) Quirine Lemoine	3	3
11	(Switzerland) Jil Teichmann	6	6

Qualifying competition
2	(Belgium) Ysaline Bonaventure	7	7
11	(Switzerland) Jil Teichmann	5	5

==== Third qualifier ====
First round
3	(Spain) Paula Badosa Gibert	6	6^{1}	6
WC	(Hungary) Adrienn Nagy	3	7^{7}	2
WC	(Hungary) Gréta Arn	7	1	6
9	(Georgia (country)) Ekaterine Gorgodze	5	6	2

Qualifying competition
3	(Spain) Paula Badosa Gibert	6^{3}	0
WC	(Hungary) Gréta Arn	7^{7}	6

==== Fourth qualifier ====
First round
4	(Czech Republic) Tereza Smitková	6	7^{7}
(Montenegro) Danka Kovinić	3	6^{3}
(Slovakia) Rebecca Šramková	6	2	2
10	(Czech Republic) Tereza Martincová	4	6	6

Qualifying competition
4	(Czech Republic) Tereza Smitková	7^{9}	6
10	(Czech Republic) Tereza Martincová	6^{7}	3

==== Fifth qualifier ====
First round
5	(Poland) Iga Świątek	6	6
(Netherlands) Bibiane Schoofs	2	3
WC	(China) Wang Xinyu	2	1
12	(Bulgaria) Viktoriya Tomova	6	6

Qualifying competition
5	(Poland) Iga Świątek	6	6
12	(Bulgaria) Viktoriya Tomova	3	2

==== Sixth qualifier ====
First round
6	(Australia) Priscilla Hon	2	3
(Spain) Georgina García Pérez	6	6
(Italy) Jasmine Paolini	1	6	7
8	(Switzerland) Conny Perrin	6	0	5

Qualifying competition
(Spain) Georgina García Pérez	6	3	6
(Italy) Jasmine Paolini	3	6	3
