= 2017 Hungarian Ladies Open – Doubles =

Doubles
- 2017 Hungarian Ladies Open

Final
- Champions: (Chinese Taipei) Hsieh Su-wei (Georgia (country)) Oksana Kalashnikova
- Runners-up: (Australia) Arina Rodionova (Kazakhstan) Galina Voskoboeva
- Score: 6–3, 4–6, [10–4]

Details
- Draw: 16
- Seeds: 4

Events
Singles	Doubles
- Hungarian Ladies Open

Ema Burgić Bucko and Georgina García Pérez were the defending champions from the event's previous edition as an ITF Women's Circuit tournament, but chose not to participate this year.

Hsieh Su-wei and Oksana Kalashnikova won the title, defeating Arina Rodionova and Galina Voskoboeva in the final, 6–3, 4–6, [10–4].

== Seeds ==
1. (Hungary) Tímea Babos / (Czech Republic) Lucie Šafářová (semifinals, withdrew)
2. (Argentina) María Irigoyen / (Switzerland) Xenia Knoll (first round)
3. (Netherlands) Demi Schuurs / (Czech Republic) Renata Voráčová (quarterfinals)
4. (Chinese Taipei) Hsieh Su-wei / (Georgia (country)) Oksana Kalashnikova (champions)

== Draw ==
Key

- Q = Qualifier
- WC = Wild card
- LL = Lucky loser
- Alt = Alternate
- ITF = ITF entry
- PR = Protected ranking
- SR = Special ranking
- SE = Special exempt
- JE = Junior exempt
- JR = Junior Accelerator Programme entrant
- CO = College Accelerator Programme entrant
- NG = Next Gen Accelerator Program entrant
- w/o = Walkover
- r = Retired
- d = Defaulted

First round
1	(Hungary) T Babos (Czech Republic) L Šafářová	7	6
(Slovakia) J Čepelová (Czech Republic) B Krejčíková	5	3
(Czech Republic) L Kunčíková (Belarus) L Marozava	3	4
WC	(Hungary) Á Bukta (Hungary) F Stollár	6	6
3	(Netherlands) D Schuurs (Czech Republic) R Voráčová	7	7
PR	(Australia) M Adamczak (United States) N Melichar	5	5
(United Kingdom) T Moore (Switzerland) C Perrin	3	4
(Australia) Ar Rodionova (Kazakhstan) G Voskoboeva	6	6
(Germany) A Beck (Germany) C Witthöft	2	2
(Romania) A Cadanțu (Germany) N Geuer	6	6
WC	(Russia) A Blinkova (Hungary) P Udvardy	1	6^{5}
4	(Chinese Taipei) S-w Hsieh (Georgia (country)) O Kalashnikova	6	7^{7}
(United Kingdom) J Rae (United Kingdom) A Smith	6	1	[9]
(Serbia) A Krunić (Serbia) N Stojanović	1	6	[11]
(Russia) I Khromacheva (Belgium) M Zanevska	6	6
2	(Argentina) M Irigoyen (Switzerland) X Knoll	0	4

Quarterfinals
1	(Hungary) T Babos (Czech Republic) L Šafářová	6	6
WC	(Hungary) Á Bukta (Hungary) F Stollár	2	0
3	(Netherlands) D Schuurs (Czech Republic) R Voráčová	4	0
(Australia) Ar Rodionova (Kazakhstan) G Voskoboeva	6	6
(Romania) A Cadanțu (Germany) N Geuer	1	6^{5}
4	(Chinese Taipei) S-w Hsieh (Georgia (country)) O Kalashnikova	6	7^{7}
(Serbia) A Krunić (Serbia) N Stojanović	6	6
(Russia) I Khromacheva (Belgium) M Zanevska	0	2

Semifinals
1	(Hungary) T Babos (Czech Republic) L Šafářová
(Australia) Ar Rodionova (Kazakhstan) G Voskoboeva	w/o
4	(Chinese Taipei) S-w Hsieh (Georgia (country)) O Kalashnikova	6	6
(Serbia) A Krunić (Serbia) N Stojanović	2	2

Final
(Australia) Ar Rodionova (Kazakhstan) G Voskoboeva	3	6	[4]
4	(Chinese Taipei) S-w Hsieh (Georgia (country)) O Kalashnikova	6	4	[10]
