= 2017 Hungarian Ladies Open =

- Date: 20 – 26 February
- Edition: 20th
- Category: International
- Draw: 32S / 16D
- Surface: Hard (indoor)
- Location: Budapest, Hungary
- Venue: SYMA Sports and Conference Centre

Champions

Singles
- (Hungary) Tímea Babos

Doubles
- (Chinese Taipei) Hsieh Su-wei / (Georgia (country)) Oksana Kalashnikova
- Hungarian Ladies Open

The 2017 Hungarian Ladies Open was a women's tennis tournament played on indoor hard courts. It was the 20th edition of the Hungarian Ladies Open, and an International-level tournament on the 2017 WTA Tour. The tournament was upgraded this year from its 2016 status as a $100,000 ITF Women's Circuit tournament. First-seeded Tímea Babos won the singles title.

== Finals ==
=== Singles ===
- (Hungary) Tímea Babos defeated (Czech Republic) Lucie Šafářová, 6–7^{(4–7)}, 6–4, 6–3

=== Doubles ===
- (Chinese Taipei) Hsieh Su-wei / (Georgia (country)) Oksana Kalashnikova defeated (Australia) Arina Rodionova / (Kazakhstan) Galina Voskoboeva, 6–3, 4–6, [10–4]

== Singles main draw entrants ==
=== Seeds ===
Country	Player	Rank^{1}	Seed
HUN	Tímea Babos	33	1
CZE	Lucie Šafářová	46	2
GER	Julia Görges	57	3
ROU	Sorana Cîrstea	61	4
BEL	Yanina Wickmayer	63	5
FRA	Pauline Parmentier	64	6
FRA	Océane Dodin	66	7
GER	Annika Beck	68	8

- ^{1} Rankings are as of 13 February 2017

=== Other entrants ===
The following players received wildcards into the main draw:

- (Hungary) Dalma Gálfi
- (Turkey) İpek Soylu
- (Hungary) Fanny Stollár

The following players received entry from the qualifying draw:

- (Russia) Anna Blinkova
- (Estonia) Anett Kontaveit
- (Germany) Tamara Korpatsch
- (Belarus) Aliaksandra Sasnovich
- (Bulgaria) Isabella Shinikova
- (Czech Republic) Barbora Štefková

=== Withdrawals ===
Before the tournament

- (Germany) Andrea Petkovic → replaced by (United States) Irina Falconi

== Doubles main draw entrants ==
=== Seeds ===
Country	Player	Country	Player	Rank^{1}	Seed
HUN	Tímea Babos	CZE	Lucie Šafářová	12	1
ARG	María Irigoyen	SUI	Xenia Knoll	104	2
NED	Demi Schuurs	CZE	Renata Voráčová	126	3
TPE	Hsieh Su-wei	GEO	Oksana Kalashnikova	149	4

- ^{1} Rankings are as of 13 February 2017

=== Other entrants ===
The following pairs received wildcards into the doubles main draw:

- (Russia) Anna Blinkova / (Hungary) Panna Udvardy
- (Hungary) Ágnes Bukta / (Hungary) Fanny Stollár

=== Withdrawals ===
During the tournament

- (Czech Republic) Lucie Šafářová
