= 2019 Hungarian Ladies Open – Doubles =

Doubles
- 2019 Hungarian Ladies Open

Final
- Champions: (Russia) Ekaterina Alexandrova (Russia) Vera Zvonareva
- Runners-up: (Hungary) Fanny Stollár (United Kingdom) Heather Watson
- Score: 6–4, 4–6, [10–7]

Events
Singles	Doubles
← 2018 ·	Hungarian Ladies Open	· 2020 →

Georgina García Pérez and Fanny Stollár were the defending champions, but chose not to participate together. García Pérez played alongside Renata Voráčová, but lost in the quarterfinals to Anna Blinkova and Anastasia Potapova.

Stollár played alongside Heather Watson, but lost in the final to Ekaterina Alexandrova and Vera Zvonareva, 4–6, 6–4, [7–10].

== Seeds ==
1. (Belgium) Kirsten Flipkens / (Sweden) Johanna Larsson (withdrew)
2. (Romania) Irina-Camelia Begu / (Kazakhstan) Galina Voskoboeva (semifinals)
3. (Hungary) Fanny Stollár / (United Kingdom) Heather Watson (final)
4. (Australia) Jessica Moore / (Russia) Alexandra Panova (first round)

== Draw ==
=== Key ===
- Q = Qualifier
- WC = Wild card
- LL = Lucky loser
- Alt = Alternate
- SE = Special exempt
- PR = Protected ranking
- ITF = ITF entry
- JE = Junior exempt
- w/o = Walkover
- r = Retired
- d = Defaulted
- SR = Special ranking

=== Draw ===
First round
1	(Belgium) K Flipkens (Sweden) J Larsson
(United Kingdom) N Broady (Australia) S Sanders	w/o
(Russia) E Alexandrova (Russia) V Zvonareva	7	2	[12]
(Czech Republic) B Štefková (Czech Republic) M Vondroušová	5	6	[10]
4	(Australia) J Moore (Russia) A Panova	6	6^{5}	[13]
(Russia) A Blinkova (Russia) A Potapova	4	7^{7}	[15]
(Spain) G García Pérez (Czech Republic) R Voráčová	6	4	[10]
(Australia) P Hon (Australia) Ar Rodionova	3	6	[3]
WC	(Hungary) RL Jani (Sweden) C Lister	4	6	[5]
(Poland) P Kania (Russia) Y Sizikova	6	1	[10]
(United States) M Brengle (Netherlands) B Schoofs	6^{4}	4
3	(Hungary) F Stollár (United Kingdom) H Watson	7^{7}	6
(Switzerland) X Knoll (Romania) A Mitu	2	6	[9]
(Montenegro) D Kovinić (New Zealand) E Routliffe	6	4	[11]
WC	(Hungary) A Bondár (Hungary) D Gálfi	3	6	[9]
2	(Romania) I-C Begu (Kazakhstan) G Voskoboeva	6	1	[11]

Quarterfinals
(United Kingdom) N Broady (Australia) S Sanders	6^{3}	6^{3}
(Russia) E Alexandrova (Russia) V Zvonareva	7^{7}	7^{7}
(Russia) A Blinkova (Russia) A Potapova	6	3	[11]
(Spain) G García Pérez (Czech Republic) R Voráčová	4	6	[9]
(Poland) P Kania (Russia) Y Sizikova	6	3	[4]
3	(Hungary) F Stollár (United Kingdom) H Watson	1	6	[10]
(Montenegro) D Kovinić (New Zealand) E Routliffe	4	5
2	(Romania) I-C Begu (Kazakhstan) G Voskoboeva	6	7

Semifinals
(Russia) E Alexandrova (Russia) V Zvonareva	4	6	[10]
(Russia) A Blinkova (Russia) A Potapova	6	4	[6]
3	(Hungary) F Stollár (United Kingdom) H Watson	6	6
2	(Romania) I-C Begu (Kazakhstan) G Voskoboeva	2	3

Final
(Russia) E Alexandrova (Russia) V Zvonareva	6	4	[10]
3	(Hungary) F Stollár (United Kingdom) H Watson	4	6	[7]
