= Fastest recorded tennis serves =

This article lists the fastest record serve speeds for men's and women's professional tennis.

The fastest, biggest recorded serve is by Sam Groth, at 263.4 km/h (163.7 mph) at a Challenger event. However, because radars are not strictly calibrated for Challenger events, the ATP does not recognize Sam Groth's serve as the official, tour-level record.

This list is not historically complete. There are reports from the 1920s, at a time when service motions were regulated differently (with mandatory one foot on the ground), that Bill Tilden had a serve that was clocked at 262.81 km/h (163.3 mph) but there is nothing to verify that. "Big Bill" Tilden also delivered another serve claimed to be officially measured at 163.61 mph (73.14 m/s / 263.30 km/h) in 1931. Britain's Mike Sangster had a serve allegedly timed at 154 mph (247.84 km/h) in 1963. Ellsworth Vines was clocked at 128 mph (206 km/h) and his 1930s contemporary Lester Rollo Stoefen sent down a serve timed at 131 mph (210.82 km/h). Also, Ellsworth Vines in the Wimbledon finals of 1932 clocked 194.73 km/h (121 mph) (without radar). The fastest serve claimed to be scientifically timed was the 137 mph (220.48 km/h) serve from Scott Carnahan at Los Angeles in 1976. Udayachand Shetty's winning serve was clocked by radar at 193.12 km/h (120 mph) using a wooden racquet, at the Gilbey Gins fast serve contest held in Chicago on 24 July 1976. This qualified him to take part in the finals at the West Side Tennis Club in Forest Hills Queens on 20 August 1976. Colin Dibley won the event with a serve of 209.21 km/h (130 mph). Then in 1981 a West German lawn tennis coach and statistician, Horst Goepper, claimed a serving speed of 199.53 mph (321.11 km/h) during a test in Weinheim.

Giovanni Mpetshi Perricard with a 237 km/h (147.3 mph) second serve in the first round of 2025 Wimbledon Championships, holds the record for the fastest second serve ever recorded.

Criteria to be listed in this article

- Men's serves must be recorded at or over 230 km/h (142.9 mph) minimum standard speed.
- Women's serves must be recorded at or over 200 km/h (124.3 mph) minimum standard speed.
- Only one serve per player is recorded here. For example, Andy Roddick has several 225.3 km/h (140 mph) or faster serves on his record but only his personal best of 249 km/h (155 mph) is included.
- In cases where more than one serve has been recorded at the same speed, the oldest recorded serve is listed first.

== Men ==
Key
W	F	SF	QF	#R	RR	Q#	DNQ	A	NH

(W) winner; (F) finalist; (SF) semifinalist; (QF) quarterfinalist; (#R) rounds 4, 3, 2, 1; (RR) round-robin stage; (Q#) qualification round; (DNQ) did not qualify; (A) absent; (NH) not held; (SR) strike rate (events won / competed); (W–L) win–loss record.
Not recognized by ATP
Unsourced or unverified

Rank	Player	Max reported	Event	Type	Round	Ref.	Non-outlier max	Average first serve
1	(Australia) Sam Groth	263.4 km/h (163.7 mph)	2012 Busan Open Challenger Tennis	Singles	2R		236.6 km/h (147.0 mph)	197.9 km/h (123.0 mph)
2	(France) Albano Olivetti	257.5 km/h (160.0 mph)	2012 Internazionali Trofeo Lame Perrel–Faip	Singles	1R		226.9 km/h (141.0 mph)	204.4 km/h (127.0 mph)
3	(Germany) Mark Wallner	257.0 km/h (159.7 mph)	2025 Atkinsons Monza Challenger	Doubles	1R			
5	(United States) John Isner	253.0 km/h (157.2 mph)	2016 Davis Cup	Singles	1R	(Note: He has a recorded serve speed of 4,718 km/h (2,932 mph) according to the ATP tour match statistics against Rafael Nadal in the 2022 Italian Open, but this record is assumed to be a recording error.)	241.4 km/h (150.0 mph)	201.2 km/h (125.0 mph)
6	(Croatia) Ivo Karlović	251 km/h (156.0 mph)	2011 Davis Cup	Doubles	1R		223.7 km/h (139.0 mph)	201.2 km/h (125.0 mph)
6	(Poland) Jerzy Janowicz	251 km/h (156.0 mph)	2012 Pekao Szczecin Open	Singles	1R	(Note: His fastest verified serve clocked in at 149.3 mph (240 km/h) in the 2013 Davis Cup and he produced a 150.4 mph (242 km/h) serve during his run in the 2012 Paris Masters, but it was a let.)	230.1 km/h (143.0 mph)–241.4 km/h (150.0 mph)	193.1 km/h (120.0 mph)
8	(Canada) Milos Raonic	249.9 km/h (155.3 mph)	2012 SAP Open	Singles	2R		243.0 km/h (151.0 mph)	201.2 km/h (125.0 mph)
9	(United States) Andy Roddick	249.4 km/h (155 mph)	2004 Davis Cup	Singles	SF		244.6 km/h (152.0 mph)	199.6 km/h (124.0 mph)
10	(Australia) Chris Guccione	248.0 km/h (154.1 mph)	2006 Davis Cup	Singles	1R			
11	(France) Giovanni Mpetshi Perricard	246.23 km/h (153.0 mph)	2025 Wimbledon Championships	Singles	1R		244.0 km/h (151.6 mph)	217.2 km/h (135.0 mph)
12	(United States) Roscoe Tanner	246.2 km/h (153 mph)	1978 American Airlines Tennis Games	Singles	F			
13	(Sweden) Joachim Johansson	244.6 km/h (152.0 mph)	2004 Davis Cup	Doubles	1R			
13	(Spain) Feliciano López	244.6 km/h (152.0 mph)	2014 Aegon Championships	Singles	1R		223.7 km/h (139.0 mph)	194.7 km/h (121.0 mph)
15	(Romania) Marius Copil	244.0 km/h (151.6 mph)	2016 European Open	Singles	QF		226.9 km/h (141.0 mph)-244.6 km/h (152.0 mph)	202.8 km/h (126.0 mph)
16	(Australia) Alexei Popyrin	243.0 km/h (151.0 mph)	2023 Tokyo	Singles	QF			
16	(Poland) Hubert Hurkacz	243.0 km/h (151.0 mph)	2016 Davis Cup	Singles	1R		215.7 km/h (134.0 mph)	194.7 km/h (121.0 mph)
18	(Germany) Oscar Otte	243.0 km/h (151.0 mph)	2021 US Open	Singles	4R			
20	(United States) Taylor Dent	241.0 km/h (149.8 mph)	2006 ABN AMRO World Tennis Tournament	Singles	1R			
21	(United States) Reilly Opelka	240.3 km/h (149.3 mph)	2021 Australian Open	Singles	2R			
22	(Latvia) Ernests Gulbis	240 km/h (149.1 mph)	2007 St. Petersburg Open	Singles	?			
22	(Argentina) Juan Martín del Potro	240 km/h (149.1 mph)	2017 Stockholm Open	Singles	F		218.9 km/h (136.0 mph)	193.1 km/h (120.0 mph)
22	(United States) Ben Shelton	240 km/h (149.1 mph)	2026 US Open – Men's singles	Singles	SF			
24	(United Kingdom) Greg Rusedski	239.8 km/h (149 mph)	1998 Newsweek Champions Cup	Singles	SF			
25	(Russia) Dmitry Tursunov	237.0 km/h (147.3 mph)	2006 Davis Cup	Singles	SF			
25	(France) Paul-Henri Mathieu	237.0 km/h (147.3 mph)	2007 Davis Cup	Singles	QF			
25	(Argentina) Thiago Agustin Tirante	237.0 km/h (147.3 mph)	2026 National Bank Open	Singles	2R			
25	(France) Jo-Wilfried Tsonga	237.0 km/h (147.3 mph)	2014 Rogers Cup	Singles	QF			
25	(United States) Frances Tiafoe	237.0 km/h (147.3 mph)	2018 Estoril Open	Singles	F			
25	(Spain) Bernabé Zapata Miralles	237.0 km/h (147.3 mph)	2022 Monte-Carlo	Singles	Q			
31	(United States) Taylor Fritz	236.6 km/h (147.0 mph)	2020 US Open	Singles	3R		218.9 km/h (136.0 mph)	186.7 km/h (116.0 mph)
31	(Germany) Alexander Zverev	236.6 km/h (147.0 mph)	2021 BNP Paribas Open	Singles	2R			
33	(Chile) Fernando González	236.0 km/h (146.6 mph)	2007 Italian Open	Singles	SF			
34	(France) Gaël Monfils	235.0 km/h (146.0 mph)	2007 Legg Mason Tennis Classic	Singles	QF	(Note: He had a recorded speed of 242.0 km/h (150 mph) at 2018 Wimbledon, but officials revoked the reading due to errors with the radar gun.)		
34	(Serbia) Dušan Vemić	235.0 km/h (146.0 mph)	2008 Countrywide Classic	Singles	?			
34	(Croatia) Marin Čilić	235.0 km/h (146.0 mph)	2016 Davis Cup	Singles	1R			
34	(Italy) Matteo Berrettini	235.0 km/h (146.0 mph)	2021 Mutua Madrid Open	Singles	F		228.5 km/h (142.0 mph)	204.4 km/h (127.0 mph)
39	(Croatia) Ivan Ljubičić	234.0 km/h (145.4 mph)	2005 Mutua Madrileña Masters Madrid	Singles	F			
39	(Lithuania) Ričardas Berankis	234.0 km/h (145.4 mph)	2011 Open d'Orléans	Singles	1R			
39	(Switzerland) Stan Wawrinka	234.0 km/h (145.4 mph)	2016 Davis Cup	Doubles	SF			
42	(United Kingdom) Andy Murray	233.4 km/h (145.0 mph)	2007 SAP Open	Singles	1R			
42	(Bulgaria) Grigor Dimitrov	233.4 km/h (145.0 mph)	2013 Aegon Championships	Singles	?			
42	(Serbia) Viktor Troicki	233.4 km/h (145.0 mph)	2017 Davis Cup	Singles	?			
42	(Poland) Tomasz Berkieta	233.4 km/h (145.0 mph)	2024 Australian Open – Boys' singles	Singles	1R			
46	(Chile) Nicolás Jarry	233.0 km/h (144.8 mph)	2018 Davis Cup	?	1R			
47	(Spain) Fernando Verdasco	232.0 km/h (144.2 mph)	2009 French Open	?	?			
47	(Austria) Dominic Thiem	232.0 km/h (144.2 mph)	2017 Gerry Weber Open	?	?			
49	(United States) Mardy Fish	231.7 km/h (144.0 mph)	2007 Pacific Life Open	Singles	1R			
49	(Poland) Marcin Matkowski	231.7 km/h (144.0 mph)	2009 ATP World Tour Finals	Doubles	?			
49	(United States) Ben Shelton	231.7 km/h (144.0 mph)	2026 US Open – Men's singles	Singles	SF			
51	(Russia) Pavel Kotov	231.0 km/h (143.5 mph)	2025 Australian Open	Singles	1R			
52	(Sweden) Robin Söderling	230.1 km/h (143.0 mph)	2010 ATP World Tour Finals	Singles	RR			
52	(Germany) Daniel Brands	230.1 km/h (143.0 mph)	2011 Intersport Heilbronn Open	?	?			
52	(Czech Republic) Jiří Veselý	230.1 km/h (143.0 mph)	2014 Wimbledon	Singles	2R			
52	(Georgia (country)) Nikoloz Basilashvili	230.1 km/h (143.0 mph)	2017 Wimbledon	Singles	2R			
52	(Australia) Nick Kyrgios	230.1 km/h (143.0 mph)	2019 Wimbledon	Singles	2R		223.7 km/h (139.0 mph)	194.7 km/h (121.0 mph)
52	(Kazakhstan) Alexander Bublik	230.1 km/h (143.0 mph)	2022 Indian Wells	Singles	2R		215.7 km/h (134.0 mph)	202.8 km/h (126.0 mph)
58	(Netherlands) Martin Verkerk	230.0 km/h (142.9 mph)	2003 Breil Milano Indoor	?	?			
58	(Switzerland) Roger Federer	230.0 km/h (142.9 mph)	2010 Gerry Weber Open	Singles	F			

== Women ==
The WTA doesn't keep official serve speed rankings of its own for all its events for a variety of reasons—mainly that serve speed isn't captured on every court at every tournament, and sometimes the technology being used isn't consistent from event to event. The Women's Tennis Association does have an external partner that it officially recognizes which measures and maintains serve speed data at selected number of events. It does not recognize at all, nor keep tabs of speed records set outside the main draw phase of WTA Tour tournaments. Therefore, serve speeds recorded from the qualifying phase of WTA tournaments are not added to the official WTA serve speed statistics. Also WTA tournament serve speeds recorded by different measurement systems or brands (at the discretion of the host or organizer) that are not using technology provided by ATP/WTA's official supplier or partner (currently SMT/IDS), or speeds recorded at any of the non-WTA professional women's tournaments such as the ITF Women's Circuit, the Fed Cup, and Olympics tennis are not added to WTA's official list of records.

Not recognized by WTA

Rank	Player	Speed	Event (Note: "IDS (Information and Display Systems) only collects serve speed data on show courts at certain events (11 in 2014) and started doing so in 1989 ... Players who have had multiple Top 10 fastest serves only have their top one listed, and if they hit that top speed multiple times, just the first time they did it is listed." http://www.wtatennis.com/news/article/1978722/title/ids-serve-speed-leaders)	Ref.
1	(Spain) Georgina García Pérez	220 km/h (136.7 mph)	2018 Hungarian Ladies Open	
2	(Belarus) Aryna Sabalenka	214 km/h (133.0 mph)	2018 WTA Elite Trophy	
3	(Germany) Sabine Lisicki	210.8 km/h (131.0 mph)	2014 Stanford	
4	(United States) Venus Williams	207.6 km/h (129.0 mph)	2007 US Open	
4	(United States) Alycia Parks	207.6 km/h (129.0 mph)	2021 US Open	
6	(United States) Serena Williams	207 km/h (128.6 mph)	2013 Australian Open	
7	(United States) Coco Gauff	206 km/h (128.0 mph)	2022 US Open	
7	(Russia) Liudmila Samsonova	206 km/h (128.0 mph)	2025 Wimbledon	
9	(Japan) Naomi Osaka	205 km/h (127.4 mph)	2024 Abu Dhabi Open	
10	(Kazakhstan) Elena Rybakina	204 km/h (126.8 mph)	2024 Abu Dhabi Open	
11	(France) Caroline Garcia	203 km/h (126.1 mph)	2016 Fed Cup	
12	(Netherlands) Brenda Schultz-McCarthy	202.7 km/h (126.0 mph)	2007 Indian Wells Masters	
13	(France) Kristina Mladenovic	200 km/h (124.3 mph)	2009 French Open	

== See also ==
- Ace (tennis)
