= 2018 Hungarian Ladies Open – Doubles =

Sports competition

Doubles
- 2018 Hungarian Ladies Open

Final
- Champions: (Spain) Georgina García Pérez (Hungary) Fanny Stollár
- Runners-up: (Belgium) Kirsten Flipkens (Sweden) Johanna Larsson
- Score: 4–6, 6–4, [10–3]

Events
| Singles | Doubles |
| ← 2017 · | Hungarian Ladies Open | · 2019 → |

Hsieh Su-wei and Oksana Kalashnikova were the defending champions, but Hsieh chose to compete in Dubai instead. Kalashnikova played alongside Natela Dzalamidze, but lost in the quarterfinals to Irina Bara and Mihaela Buzărnescu.

Georgina García Pérez and Fanny Stollár won the title, defeating Kirsten Flipkens and Johanna Larsson in the final, 4–6, 6–4, [10–3]. This was the first WTA Tour title for both García Pérez and Stollár.

== Seeds ==
1. (Belgium) Kirsten Flipkens / (Sweden) Johanna Larsson (final)
2. (United Kingdom) Anna Smith / (Czech Republic) Renata Voráčová (first round)
3. (Russia) Natela Dzalamidze / (Georgia (country)) Oksana Kalashnikova (quarterfinals)
4. (Netherlands) Lesley Kerkhove / (Belarus) Lidziya Marozava (quarterfinals)

== Draw ==
=== Key ===
- Q = Qualifier
- WC = Wild card
- LL = Lucky loser
- Alt = Alternate
- SE = Special exempt
- PR = Protected ranking
- ITF = ITF entry
- JE = Junior exempt
- w/o = Walkover
- r = Retired
- d = Defaulted
- SR = Special ranking

=== Draw ===
First round
1 | (Belgium) K Flipkens (Sweden) J Larsson | 4 | 6 | [10]
(Sweden) C Lister (Russia) Y Sizikova | 6 | 0 | [5]
WC | (Hungary) D Gálfi (Hungary) P Udvardy | 4 | 6 | [2]
(Belgium) Y Bonaventure (Hungary) RL Jani | 6 | 2 | [10]
3 | (Russia) N Dzalamidze (Georgia (country)) O Kalashnikova | 2 | 6 | [10]
(China) X Han (Slovenia) D Jakupović | 6 | 1 | [6]
(Russia) A Blinkova (Croatia) D Jurak | 6^{5} | 1
(Romania) I Bara (Romania) M Buzărnescu | 7^{7} | 6
(Russia) A Komardina (Serbia) N Stojanović | 6 | 6
(Australia) M Adamczak (Netherlands) E Wacanno | 0 | 3
(Ukraine) K Kozlova (Australia) Ar Rodionova | 4 | 4
4 | (Netherlands) L Kerkhove (Belarus) L Marozava | 6 | 6
(Spain) G García Pérez (Hungary) F Stollár | 6 | 6
WC | (Hungary) A Bondár (Hungary) Á Bukta | 3 | 4
(Switzerland) X Knoll (Serbia) A Krunić | 6 | 0 | [10]
2 | (United Kingdom) A Smith (Czech Republic) R Voráčová | 4 | 6 | [4]

Quarterfinals
1 | (Belgium) K Flipkens (Sweden) J Larsson | 6^{4} | 6 | [10]
(Belgium) Y Bonaventure (Hungary) RL Jani | 7^{7} | 4 | [5]
3 | (Russia) N Dzalamidze (Georgia (country)) O Kalashnikova | 3 | 5
(Romania) I Bara (Romania) M Buzărnescu | 6 | 7
(Russia) A Komardina (Serbia) N Stojanović | 6 | 6
4 | (Netherlands) L Kerkhove (Belarus) L Marozava | 4 | 1
(Spain) G García Pérez (Hungary) F Stollár | 6 | 6
(Switzerland) X Knoll (Serbia) A Krunić | 4 | 3

Semifinals
1 | (Belgium) K Flipkens (Sweden) J Larsson | 6^{3} | 6 | [10]
(Romania) I Bara (Romania) M Buzărnescu | 7^{7} | 4 | [5]
(Russia) A Komardina (Serbia) N Stojanović | 4 | 4
(Spain) G García Pérez (Hungary) F Stollár | 6 | 6

Final
1 | (Belgium) K Flipkens (Sweden) J Larsson | 6 | 4 | [3]
(Spain) G García Pérez (Hungary) F Stollár | 4 | 6 | [10]
