= 2017 Hungarian Ladies Open – Singles =

Singles
- 2017 Hungarian Ladies Open

Final
- Champion: (Hungary) Tímea Babos
- Runner-up: (Czech Republic) Lucie Šafářová
- Score: 6–7^{(4–7)}, 6–4, 6–3

Details
- Draw: 32
- Seeds: 8

Events
Singles	Doubles
- Hungarian Ladies Open

Elitsa Kostova was the defending champion from the event's previous edition as an ITF Women's Circuit tournament, but lost in the first round of qualifying to Barbora Štefková.

First-seeded Tímea Babos won the title, defeating Lucie Šafářová in the final, 6–7^{(4–7)}, 6–4, 6–3.

== Seeds ==
1. (Hungary) Tímea Babos (champion)
2. (Czech Republic) Lucie Šafářová (final)
3. (Germany) Julia Görges (semifinals)
4. (Romania) Sorana Cîrstea (first round)
5. (Belgium) Yanina Wickmayer (quarterfinals)
6. (France) Pauline Parmentier (second round)
7. (France) Océane Dodin (quarterfinals)
8. (Germany) Annika Beck (quarterfinals)

== Draw ==
Key

- Q = Qualifier
- WC = Wild card
- LL = Lucky loser
- Alt = Alternate
- ITF = ITF entry
- PR = Protected ranking
- SR = Special ranking
- SE = Special exempt
- JE = Junior exempt
- JR = Junior Accelerator Programme entrant
- CO = College Accelerator Programme entrant
- NG = Next Gen Accelerator Program entrant
- w/o = Walkover
- r = Retired
- d = Defaulted

=== Finals ===
Semifinals
1	(Hungary) Tímea Babos	7	6
3	(Germany) Julia Görges	5	1
(Germany) Carina Witthöft	4	3
2	(Czech Republic) Lucie Šafářová	6	6

Final
1	(Hungary) Tímea Babos	6^{4}	6	6
2	(Czech Republic) Lucie Šafářová	7^{7}	4	3

=== Top half ===
First round
1	(Hungary) T Babos	6	6
WC	(Turkey) İ Soylu	3	2
(United Kingdom) N Broady	6	4	3
Q	(Russia) A Blinkova	3	6	6
(Russia) E Rodina	3	3
Q	(Germany) T Korpatsch	6	6
WC	(Hungary) D Gálfi	4	4
7	(France) O Dodin	6	6
3	(Germany) J Görges	6^{3}	6	6
Q	(Estonia) A Kontaveit	7^{7}	3	4
(Russia) E Alexandrova	3	5
(Croatia) D Vekić	6	7
(Czech Republic) D Allertová	7^{8}	3	4
(Russia) I Khromacheva	6^{6}	6	6
Q	(Bulgaria) I Shinikova	3	6	5
5	(Belgium) Y Wickmayer	6	4	7

Second round
1	(Hungary) T Babos	6	6
Q	(Russia) A Blinkova	3	2
Q	(Germany) T Korpatsch	2	1
7	(France) O Dodin	6	6
3	(Germany) J Görges	6	6
(Croatia) D Vekić	2	2
(Russia) I Khromacheva	4	2
5	(Belgium) Y Wickmayer	6	6

Quarterfinals
1	(Hungary) T Babos	6	2	6
7	(France) O Dodin	4	6	1
3	(Germany) J Görges	6	7
5	(Belgium) Y Wickmayer	1	5

Semifinals
1	(Hungary) T Babos	7	6
3	(Germany) J Görges	5	1

=== Bottom half ===
First round
8	(Germany) A Beck	6	6
(Slovakia) J Čepelová	2	2
(Montenegro) D Kovinić	2	6^{4}
WC	(Hungary) F Stollár	6	7^{7}
Q	(Czech Republic) B Štefková	6	5	4
(United States) I Falconi	4	7	6
(Germany) C Witthöft	6	6
4	(Romania) S Cîrstea	3	2
6	(France) P Parmentier	7^{7}	7^{7}
(Ukraine) K Kozlova	6^{3}	6^{2}
(Belgium) K Flipkens	6	4	1
Q	(Belarus) A Sasnovich	4	6	6
(Spain) S Sorribes Tormo	6	3	1
(Chinese Taipei) S-w Hsieh	2	6	6
(Poland) M Linette	0	7	6^{4}
2	(Czech Republic) L Šafářová	6	5	7^{7}

Second round
8	(Germany) A Beck	6	6
WC	(Hungary) F Stollár	2	0
(United States) I Falconi	6^{3}	3
(Germany) C Witthöft	7^{7}	6
6	(France) P Parmentier	6^{3}	4
Q	(Belarus) A Sasnovich	7^{7}	6
(Chinese Taipei) S-w Hsieh	2	1
2	(Czech Republic) L Šafářová	6	6

Quarterfinals
8	(Germany) A Beck	1	1
(Germany) C Witthöft	6	6
Q	(Belarus) A Sasnovich	3	5
2	(Czech Republic) L Šafářová	6	7

Semifinals
(Germany) C Witthöft	4	3
2	(Czech Republic) L Šafářová	6	6

== Qualifying ==
=== Seeds ===
1. (Estonia) Anett Kontaveit (qualified)
2. (Slovakia) Rebecca Šramková (first round)
3. (Romania) Ana Bogdan (qualifying competition)
4. (Belgium) Maryna Zanevska (qualifying competition)
5. (Serbia) Nina Stojanović (first round)
6. (Belarus) Aliaksandra Sasnovich (qualified)
7. (Serbia) Aleksandra Krunić (first round)
8. (Bulgaria) Elitsa Kostova (first round)
9. (Bulgaria) Isabella Shinikova (qualified)
10. (Netherlands) Cindy Burger (first round)
11. (Serbia) Ivana Jorović (qualifying competition)
12. (Russia) Anna Blinkova (qualified)

=== Qualifiers ===
1. (Estonia) Anett Kontaveit
2. (Bulgaria) Isabella Shinikova
3. (Russia) Anna Blinkova
4. (Czech Republic) Barbora Štefková
5. (Germany) Tamara Korpatsch
6. (Belarus) Aliaksandra Sasnovich

=== Draw ===
==== First qualifier ====
First round
1	(Estonia) Anett Kontaveit	6	3	6
(Austria) Barbara Haas	4	6	2
(Bulgaria) Viktoriya Tomova	2	6	6
7	(Serbia) Aleksandra Krunić	6	3	2

Qualifying competition
1	(Estonia) Anett Kontaveit	6	6
(Bulgaria) Viktoriya Tomova	3	3

==== Second qualifier ====
First round
2	(Slovakia) Rebecca Šramková	2	2
(Czech Republic) Tereza Smitková	6	6
(Czech Republic) Tereza Martincová	6^{5}	3
9	(Bulgaria) Isabella Shinikova	7^{7}	6

Qualifying competition
(Czech Republic) Tereza Smitková	3	4
9	(Bulgaria) Isabella Shinikova	6	6

==== Third qualifier ====
First round
3	(Romania) Ana Bogdan	6	7
WC	(Hungary) Panna Udvardy	1	5
WC	(Russia) Valeria Savinykh	1	7^{7}	3
12	(Russia) Anna Blinkova	6	6^{5}	6

Qualifying competition
3	(Romania) Ana Bogdan	4	3
12	(Russia) Anna Blinkova	6	6

==== Fourth qualifier ====
First round
4	(Belgium) Maryna Zanevska	6	6
WC	(Hungary) Ágnes Bukta	4	1
(Czech Republic) Barbora Štefková	6	6
8	(Bulgaria) Elitsa Kostova	2	1

Qualifying competition
4	(Belgium) Maryna Zanevska	2	3
(Czech Republic) Barbora Štefková	6	6

==== Fifth qualifier ====
First round
5	(Serbia) Nina Stojanović	3	3
(Croatia) Jana Fett	6	6
(Germany) Tamara Korpatsch	2	6	6
10	(Netherlands) Cindy Burger	6	4	2

Qualifying competition
(Croatia) Jana Fett	2	4
(Germany) Tamara Korpatsch	6	6

==== Sixth qualifier ====
First round
6	(Belarus) Aliaksandra Sasnovich	7^{7}	6^{4}	6
WC	(Kazakhstan) Galina Voskoboeva	6^{5}	7^{7}	4
(Russia) Elizaveta Kulichkova	3	6	1
11	(Serbia) Ivana Jorović	6	3	6

Qualifying competition
6	(Belarus) Aliaksandra Sasnovich	3	6	6
11	(Serbia) Ivana Jorović	6	3	4
