= Alison Van Uytvanck =

Belgian former tennis player (born 1994)

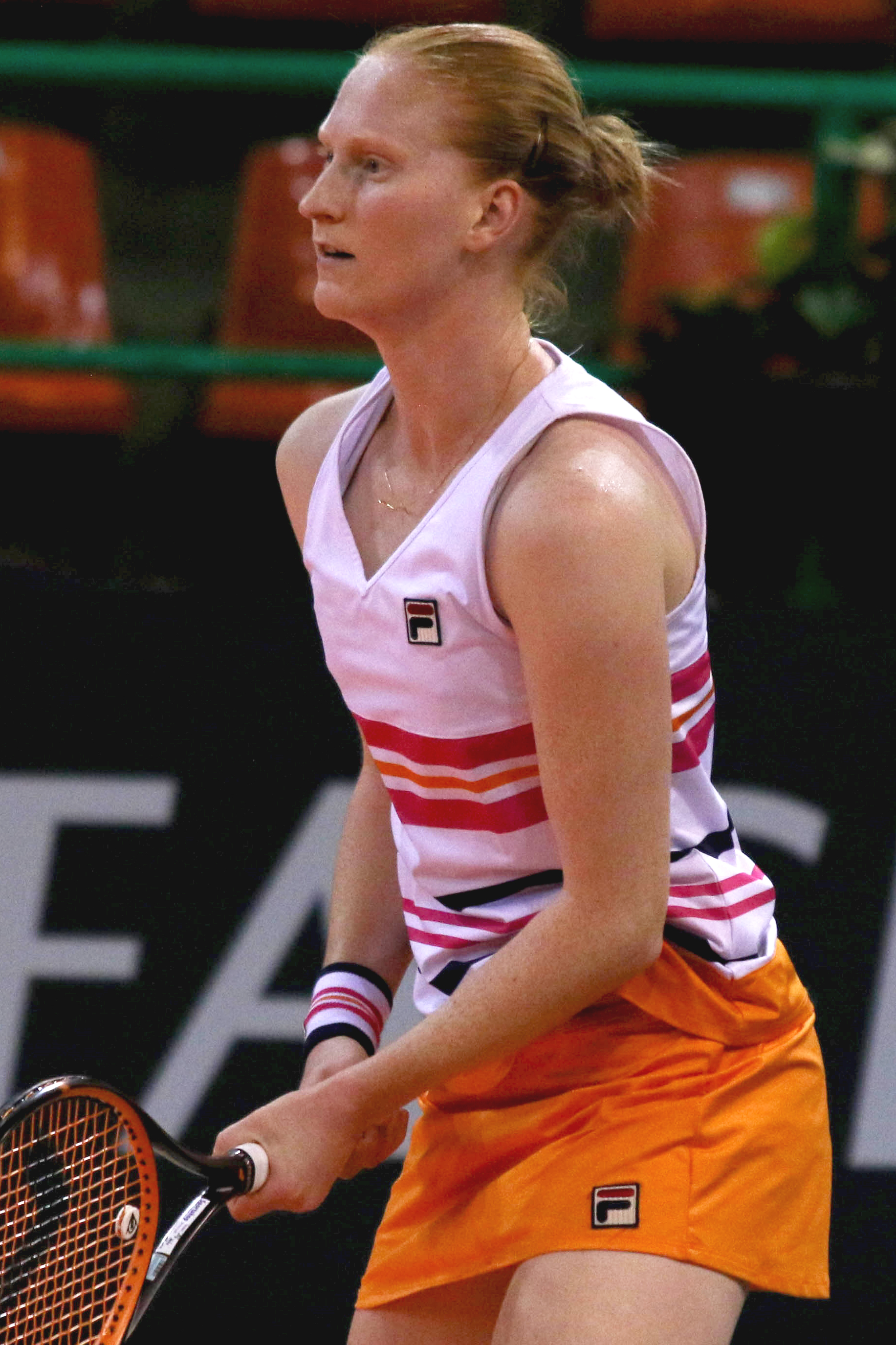
- Van Uytvanck at the 2019 Open de Limoges
- Country (sports): Belgium
- Born: 26 March 1994 (age 32) Vilvoorde, Belgium
- Height: 1.73 m (5 ft 8 in)
- Turned pro: 2010
- Retired: August 2024
- Plays: Right-handed (two-handed backhand)
- Coach: Ann Devries
- Prize money: US$ 4,452,645
- Official website: alisonvanuytvanck.be

Singles
- Career record: 391–268
- Career titles: 5
- Highest ranking: No. 37 (13 August 2018)

Grand Slam singles results
- Australian Open: 2R (2021, 2022)
- French Open: QF (2015)
- Wimbledon: 4R (2018)
- US Open: 2R (2019, 2022)

Other tournaments
- Olympic Games: 3R (2021)

Doubles
- Career record: 70–75
- Career titles: 2
- Highest ranking: No. 66 (16 May 2022)

Grand Slam doubles results
- Australian Open: 3R (2023)
- French Open: 2R (2020, 2022)
- Wimbledon: 3R (2015)
- US Open: 3R (2021)

Team competitions
- Fed Cup: 15–15
- Last updated on: 19 August 2024.

Alison Van Uytvanck (Dutch pronunciation: [vɑn ˈœytfɑŋk]; born 26 March 1994) is a Belgian former professional tennis player. In August 2018, she reached her best singles ranking of world No. 37.

Van Uytvanck won five singles and two doubles WTA Tour titles and three Challenger Tour singles titles, as well as 15 singles and two doubles titles on the ITF Circuit.

== Personal life ==
Van Uytvanck was born in the small town of Grimbergen to René Van Uytvanck and Krista Laemers. She started playing tennis at age five when her older brother Sean introduced her to the game. She has a twin brother named Brett. Van Uytvanck graduated from high school at Sint-Donatus in Merchtem. As a junior, she alternated between training with local coach Sacha Katsnelson and the Flemish Tennis Association, where she was coached by Ann Devries. She admires Roger Federer, and her compatriot Kim Clijsters. Van Uytvanck was in a relationship with fellow Belgian tennis player Greet Minnen. In July 2023, she married Emilie Vermeiren.

== Career ==
Van Uytvanck played her first professional tennis match aged 15 in 2009. She made her WTA Tour main-draw debut at the 2011 Brussels Open where she entered as a qualifier and defeated Patty Schnyder in the first round, before losing to fellow Belgian and sixth seed Yanina Wickmayer in her next match.

In February 2012, she debuted for Belgium in Fed Cup against Serbia, partnering with Yanina Wickmayer in the deciding doubles match, which they lost to Ana Ivanovic and Bojana Jovanovski.

As a wildcard entrant at the 2012 Brussels Open, Van Uytvanck reached her first WTA quarterfinal, where she lost to top seed Agnieszka Radwańska.

Ranked world No. 129, she won her first WTA 125 title at the 2013 Taipei Ladies Open, defeating world No. 50 and second seed Yanina Wickmayer in the final.

Van Uytvanck made her major main-draw debut at the 2014 Australian Open, losing to Virginie Razzano in the first round. In June 2014 at Wimbledon, she got her maiden win at a major, overcoming Monica Niculescu to make it through to the second round, at which point she lost to 10th seed Dominika Cibulková in three sets.

Her best run at a major came at the 2015 French Open, where she made the quarterfinals, losing to Timea Bacsinszky.

Van Uytvanck won her first WTA title at the 2017 Coupe Banque Nationale in Quebec City, defeating Tímea Babos in the final in three sets.

Her second WTA title came in February 2018 at Hungarian Ladies Open, where she outlasted top seed Dominika Cibulková in a three set final played over two hours and 11 minutes.

At the 2018 Wimbledon Championships, she defeated Polona Hercog in the first round and then eliminated defending champion and third seed, Garbiñe Muguruza, to record her first win over a top-10 ranked player. Next Van Uytvanck overcame 28th seed Anett Kontaveit, before losing in the fourth round to 14th seed Daria Kasatkina.

Partnering Greet Minnen, she won her first WTA Tour doubles title at the 2018 Luxembourg Open, defeating Vera Lapko and Mandy Minella in the final.

In February 2019, Van Uytvanck successfully defended her title at the Hungarian Ladies Open, with a win over Markéta Vondroušová in the final. She won her second title of 2019 at the Tashkent Open in September, defeating Sorana Cîrstea in the final.

Representing Belgium at the delayed Tokyo Olympics, Van Uytvanck defeated 10th seed Petra Kvitová in the second round, before losing to seventh seed Garbiñe Muguruza in her next match.

Alongside Greet Minnen, she beat Erin Routliffe and Kimberley Zimmermann in the final to win the doubles title at Luxembourg Open in September 2021. The following week Van Uytvanck claimed her fifth, and last, WTA title at the 2021 Astana Open, defeating top seed Yulia Putintseva in the final.

She won the WTA 125 event in Limoges in December 2021, overcoming Ana Bogdan in the final.

As top seed, Van Uytvanck defeated Sara Errani in the final to claim the title at the 2022 WTA 125 Veneto Open.

She won the 24th, and final, singles title of her career at the ITF W100 Surbiton Trophy in June 2024, overcoming second seed Tatjana Maria in the championship match.

On 19 August 2024, Van Uytvanck announced her retirement from professional tennis at the age of 30, stating she no longer had the "same fire it takes to give my all" after struggling "physically and especially mentally" following a back injury which had forced her to miss most of the 2023 season.

== Performance timelines ==
Key
W	F	SF	QF	#R	RR	Q#	P#	DNQ	A	Z#	PO	G	S	B	NMS	NTI	P	NH

(W) winner; (F) finalist; (SF) semifinalist; (QF) quarterfinalist; (#R) rounds 4, 3, 2, 1; (RR) round-robin stage; (Q#) qualification round; (P#) preliminary round; (DNQ) did not qualify; (A) absent; (Z#) Davis/Fed Cup Zonal Group (with number indication) or (PO) play-off; (G) gold, (S) silver or (B) bronze Olympic/Paralympic medal; (NMS) not a Masters tournament; (NTI) not a Tier I tournament; (P) postponed; (NH) not held; (SR) strike rate (events won / competed); (W–L) win–loss record.
To avoid confusion and double counting, these charts are updated at the conclusion of a tournament or when the player's participation has ended.

Only main-draw results in WTA Tour, Grand Slam tournaments, Fed Cup/Billie Jean King Cup and Olympic Games are included in win–loss records.

=== Singles ===
Current through the 2024 Wimbledon Championships.

Tournament	2011	2012	2013	2014	2015	2016	2017	2018	2019	2020	2021	2022	2023	2024	SR	W–L	Win %
Grand Slam tournaments
Australian Open	A	A	A	1R	1R	1R	A	1R	1R	1R	2R	2R	1R	A	0 / 9	2–9	18%
French Open	A	A	A	1R	QF	A	2R	2R	1R	2R	1R	2R	A	1R	0 / 9	8–9	47%
Wimbledon	A	A	Q2	2R	1R	1R	1R	4R	2R	NH	1R	1R	A	1R	0 / 9	5–9	36%
US Open	A	A	Q3	1R	1R	1R	1R	1R	2R	1R	1R	2R	A	A	0 / 9	2–9	18%
Win–loss	0–0	0–0	0–0	1–4	4–4	0–3	1–3	4–4	2–4	1–3	1–4	3–4	0–1	0–2	0 / 36	17–36	32%
National representation
Summer Olympics	NH	A	NH			A	NH				3R	NH		A	0 / 1	2–1	67%
United Cup	NH												RR	A	0 / 1	2–0	100%
WTA 1000
Dubai / Qatar Open (Note: The first Premier 5 event of the year has switched back and forth between the Dubai Tennis Championships and the Qatar Ladies Open since 2009. Dubai was classified as a Premier 5 event from 2009 to 2011 before being succeeded by Doha for the 2012–2014 period. In 2015, Dubai regained its Premier 5 status while Doha was demoted to Premier status. The Premier 5 tournaments were reclassified as WTA 1000 tournaments in 2021.)	A	A	A	A	A	A	A	A	A	2R	A	2R	A	A	0 / 2	2–2	50%
Indian Wells Open	A	A	A	1R	2R	1R	Q1	1R	2R	NH	A	2R	A	A	0 / 6	3–6	33%
Miami Open	A	A	A	Q1	2R	1R	Q2	2R	A	NH	A	1R	A	A	0 / 4	2–4	33%
Madrid Open	A	A	A	Q1	A	A	A	1R	1R	NH	Q1	A	A	A	0 / 2	0–2	0%
Italian Open	A	A	A	A	A	A	A	2R	A	A	A	A	A	A	0 / 1	1–1	50%
Canadian Open	A	A	A	A	1R	A	Q2	2R	A	NH	1R	A	A	A	0 / 3	1–3	25%
Cincinnati Open	A	A	A	Q1	A	Q1	Q1	Q1	A	1R	A	A	A	A	0 / 1	0–1	0%
Pan Pacific / Wuhan Open (Note: In 2014, the Pan Pacific Open was downgraded to a Premier event and replaced by the Wuhan Open. The Premier 5 tournaments were reclassified as WTA 1000 tournaments in 2021.)	A	A	A	Q2	A	A	A	1R	A	NH				A	0 / 1	0–1	0%
China Open	A	A	A	Q2	2R	A	A	1R	A	NH			A	A	0 / 2	1–2	33%
Career statistics
Tournaments	2	1	3	17	18	13	8	23	20	11	16	13	4	4	Career total: 153		
Titles	0	0	0	0	0	0	1	1	2	0	1	0	0	0	Career total: 5		
Finals	0	0	0	0	0	0	1	1	2	0	1	0	0	0	Career total: 5		
Overall win–loss	1–2	3–2	1–4	10–17	19–18	4–13	8–8	21–22	24–20	7–11	15–15	8–14	5–4	0–4	5 / 153	126–154	45%
Year-end ranking	297	220	129	80	42	124	75	50	47	63	68	54	299	–	$4,068,237		

=== Doubles ===
Tournament	2014	2015	2016	2017	2018	2019	2020	2021	2022	2023	SR	W–L	Win %
Grand Slam tournaments
Australian Open	A	A	1R	A	1R	1R	1R	1R	1R	3R	0 / 7	2–7	0%
French Open	A	A	A	A	1R	1R	2R	1R	2R	A	0 / 5	2–5	29%
Wimbledon	A	3R	A	A	A	2R	NH	2R	A	A	0 / 3	4–3	57%
US Open	1R	1R	A	A	1R	A	1R	3R	1R	A	0 / 6	2–6	25%
Win–loss	0–1	2–2	0–1	0–0	0–3	1–3	1–3	3–4	1–3	2–1	0 / 21	10–21	32%
Titles	0	0	0	0	1	0	0	1	0	0	Career total: 2		
Finals	0	1	0	0	1	0	0	2	0	0	Career total: 4		

== WTA Tour finals ==
=== Singles: 5 (5 titles) ===
Legend Grand Slam WTA 1000 WTA 500 WTA 250 (5–0)	Finals by surface Hard (4–0) Grass (0–0) Clay (0–0) Carpet (1–0)

Result	W–L	Date	Tournament	Tier	Surface	Opponents	Score
Win	1–0	Sep 2017	Tournoi de Québec, Canada	International (Note: The WTA International tournaments were reclassified as WTA 250 tournaments in 2021.)	Carpet (i)	(Hungary) Tímea Babos	5–7, 6–4, 6–1
Win	2–0	Feb 2018	Hungarian Ladies Open	International	Hard (i)	(Slovakia) Dominika Cibulková	6–3, 3–6, 7–5
Win	3–0	Feb 2019	Hungarian Ladies Open (2)	International	Hard (i)	(Czech Republic) Markéta Vondroušová	1–6, 7–5, 6–2
Win	4–0	Sep 2019	Tashkent Open, Uzbekistan	International	Hard	(Romania) Sorana Cîrstea	6–2, 4–6, 6–4
Win	5–0	Oct 2021	Astana Open, Kazakhstan	WTA 250	Hard (i)	(Kazakhstan) Yulia Putintseva	1–6, 6–4, 6–3

=== Doubles: 4 (2 titles, 2 runner-ups) ===
Legend Grand Slam WTA 1000 WTA 500 (0–1) WTA 250 (2–1)	Finals by surface Hard (2–1) Grass (0–0) Clay (0–1) Carpet (0–0)

Result	W–L	Date	Tournament	Tier	Surface	Partner	Opponents	Score
Loss	0–1	Feb 2015	Diamond Games, Belgium	Premier (Note: The WTA Premier tournaments were reclassified as WTA 500 tournaments in 2021.)	Hard (i)	(Belgium) An-Sophie Mestach	(Spain) Anabel Medina Garrigues (Spain) Arantxa Parra Santonja	4–6, 6–3, [5–10]
Win	1–1	Oct 2018	Luxembourg Open	International	Hard (i)	(Belgium) Greet Minnen	(Belarus) Vera Lapko (Luxembourg) Mandy Minella	7–6^{(7–3)}, 6–2
Loss	1–2	May 2021	Serbia Open	WTA 250	Clay	(Belgium) Greet Minnen	(Serbia) Aleksandra Krunić (Serbia) Nina Stojanović	0–6, 2–6
Win	2–2	Sep 2021	Luxembourg Open (2)	WTA 250	Hard (i)	(Belgium) Greet Minnen	(New Zealand) Erin Routliffe (Belgium) Kimberley Zimmermann	6–3, 6–3

== WTA Challenger finals ==
=== Singles: 4 (3 titles, 1 runner-up) ===
Result	W–L	Date	Tournament	Surface	Opponent	Score
Win	1–0	Nov 2013	Taipei Ladies Open, Taiwan	Carpet (i)	(Belgium) Yanina Wickmayer	6–4, 6–2
Loss	1–1	Aug 2019	Karlsruhe Open, Germany	Clay	(Romania) Patricia Maria Țig	6–3, 1–6, 2–6
Win	2–1	Dec 2021	Open de Limoges, France	Hard (i)	(Romania) Ana Bogdan	6–2, 7–5
Win	3–1	Jun 2022	Veneto Open, Italy	Grass	(Italy) Sara Errani	6–4, 6–3

=== Doubles: 2 (runner–ups) ===
Result	W–L	Date	Tournament	Surface	Partner	Opponents	Score
Loss	0–1	Nov 2013	Taipei Ladies Open, Taiwan	Carpet (i)	(Germany) Anna-Lena Friedsam	(France) Caroline Garcia (Kazakhstan) Yaroslava Shvedova	3–6, 3–6
Loss	0–2	May 2022	Karlsruhe Open, Germany	Clay	Yana Sizikova	(Egypt) Mayar Sherif (Hungary) Panna Udvardy	7–5, 4–6, [2–10]

== ITF Circuit finals ==
=== Singles: 24 (16 titles, 8 runner–ups) ===
Legend $100,000 tournaments (3–2) $50/60,000 tournaments (2–1) $25/35,000 tournaments (6–3) $10,000 tournaments (5–2)	Finals by surface Hard (10–5) Clay (3–1) Grass (3–1) Carpet (0–1)

Result	W–L	Date	Tournament	Tier	Surface	Opponent	Score
Win	1–0	Feb 2011	ITF Vale do Lobo, Portugal	10,000	Hard	(Bulgaria) Elitsa Kostova	6–3, 4–6, 6–2
Win	2–0	Mar 2011	ITF Dijon, France	10,000	Hard	(France) Claire Feuerstein	6–2, 6–3
Loss	2–1	Apr 2011	ITF Tessenderlo, Belgium	25,000	Clay (i)	(Germany) Anna-Lena Grönefeld	3–6, 5–7
Win	3–1	May 2011	ITF Edinburgh, United Kingdom	10,000	Clay	(Poland) Justyna Jegiołka	6–7^{(5)}, 6–4, 6–2
Win	4–1	Nov 2011	ITF Sunderland, UK	10,000	Hard (i)	(United Kingdom) Tara Moore	6–4, 6–1
Win	5–1	Jan 2012	GB Pro-Series Glasgow, UK	10,000	Hard (i)	(United Kingdom) Francesca Stephenson	6–3, 6–1
Loss	5–2	Jan 2012	ITF Kaarst, Germany	10,000	Hard (i)	(Germany) Dinah Pfizenmaier	4–6, 4–6
Loss	5–3	Oct 2012	GB Pro-Series Glasgow, UK	25,000	Hard (i)	(United Kingdom) Samantha Murray	3–6, 6–2, 3–6
Win	6–3	Nov 2012	ITF Equeurdréville, France	25,000	Hard (i)	(France) Julie Coin	6–1, 3–6, 6–3
Win	7–3	Jan 2013	Open Andrézieux-Bouthéon, France	25,000	Hard (i)	(Croatia) Ana Vrljić	6–1, 6–4
Loss	7–4	Mar 2013	ITF Sunderland, UK	10,000	Hard (i)	(Germany) Anna-Lena Friedsam	2–6, 6–7^{(4)}
Win	8–4	Apr 2013	Chiasso Open, Switzerland	25,000	Clay	(Poland) Katarzyna Kawa	7–6^{(2)}, 6–3
Win	9–4	Sep 2013	GB Pro-Series Shrewsbury, UK	25,000	Hard (i)	(Russia) Marta Sirotkina	7–5, 6–1
Loss	9–5	Sep 2013	GB Pro-Series Loughborough, UK	25,000	Hard (i)	(Germany) Anna-Lena Friedsam	3–6, 0–6
Win	10–5	Jul 2016	Stockton Challenger, United States	50,000	Hard	(Russia) Anastasia Pivovarova	6–3, 3–6, 6–2
Win	11–5	Oct 2016	Las Vegas Open, United States	50,000	Hard	(United States) Sofia Kenin	3–6, 7–6^{(4)}, 6–2
Loss	11–6	Jun 2017	Ilkley Trophy, UK	100,000	Grass	(Slovakia) Magdaléna Rybáriková	5–7, 6–7^{(3)}
Loss	11–7	Oct 2017	Internationaux de Poitiers, France	100,000	Hard (i)	(Romania) Mihaela Buzărnescu	4–6, 2–6
Win	12–7	Jun 2021	Nottingham Trophy, UK	W100	Grass	(Australia) Arina Rodionova	6–0, 6–4
Win	13–7	Jun 2022	Surbiton Trophy, UK	W100	Grass	(Australia) Arina Rodionova	7–6^{(3)}, 6–2
Win	14–7	Oct 2023	ITF Reims, France	W25	Hard (i)	Julia Avdeeva	6–4, 6–4
Loss	14–8	Feb 2024	AK Ladies Open, Germany	W75	Carpet (i)	Julia Avdeeva	4–6, 4–6
Win	15–8	Apr 2024	ITF Hammamet, Tunisia	W35	Clay	(Burundi) Sada Nahimana	6–4, 6–2
Win	16–8	Jun 2024	Surbiton Trophy, UK	W100	Grass	(Germany) Tatjana Maria	6–7^{(5)}, 6–1, 6–2

=== Doubles: 4 (2 titles, 2 runner–ups) ===
Legend $50,000 tournaments (2–0) $10,000 tournaments (0–2)	Finals by surface Hard (2–2)

Result	W–L	Date	Tournament	Tier	Surface	Partner	Opponents	Score
Loss	0–1	Aug 2010	ITF Westende, Belgium	10,000	Hard	(Russia) Irina Khromacheva	(Netherlands) Quirine Lemoine (Netherlands) Demi Schuurs	6–3, 4–6 [4–10]
Loss	0–2	Mar 2012	ITF Dijon, France	10,000	Hard (i)	(Russia) Yana Sizikova	(Latvia) Diāna Marcinkēviča (Greece) Despina Papamichail	5–7, 6–7^{(7)}
Win	1–2	Mar 2013	Open de Seine-et-Marne, France	50,000	Hard (i)	(Germany) Anna-Lena Friedsam	(France) Stéphanie Foretz (Czech Republic) Eva Hrdinová	6–3, 6–4
Win	2–2	Jul 2016	Stockton Challenger, US	50,000	Hard	(Czech Republic) Kristýna Plíšková	(United States) Robin Anderson (United States) Maegan Manasse	6–2, 6–3

== Head-to-head records ==
=== Record against top 10 players ===
Van Uytvanck's record against players who have been ranked in the top 10. Active players are in boldface.

Player	Record	Win%	Hard	Clay	Grass	Last match
**Number 1 ranked players**						
**(Japan) Naomi Osaka**	1–0	100%	–	1–0	–	Won (6–3, 7–5) at 2017 French Open
(Serbia) Ana Ivanovic	1–0	100%	1–0	–	–	Won (6–4, 6–7, 7–5) at 2015 Luxembourg
**(Poland) Iga Świątek**	1–0	100%	1–0	–	–	Won (6–4, 7–5) at 2019 Budapest
**(United States) Venus Williams**	1–0	100%	1–0	–	–	Won (6–1, 7–6) at 2022 US Open
**(Belarus) Aryna Sabalenka**	1–2	33%	0–1	–	1–1	Lost (3–6, 6–3, 6–7) at 2022 's-Hertogenbosch
(Spain) Garbiñe Muguruza	1–4	20%	0–4	–	1–0	Lost (4–6, 1–6) at 2020 Olympics
(United States) Serena Williams	0–1	0%	0–1	–	–	Lost (0–6, 4–6) at 2015 Australian Open
**(Belarus) Victoria Azarenka**	0–1	0%	0–1	–	–	Lost (0–6, 0–6) at 2016 Australian Open
**(Czech Republic) Karolína Plíšková**	0–2	0%	0–1	0–1	–	Lost (1–6, 6–4, 4–6) at 2014 Hong Kong
(Australia) Ashleigh Barty	0–2	0%	0–1	–	0–1	Lost (1–6, 3–6) at 2017 Wimbledon
(Denmark) Caroline Wozniacki	0–2	0%	0–1	0–1	–	Lost (3–6, 4–6) at 2019 Australian Open
**(Kazakhstan) Elena Rybakina**	0–3	0%	0–1	–	0–1	Lost (1–6, 5–7) at 2022 Indian Wells
Number 2 ranked players						
**(Russia) Vera Zvonareva**	4–0	100%	4–0	–	–	Won (6–0, 6–3) at 2022 Lyon
**(Russia)** Svetlana Kuznetsova	1–0	100%	–	–	1–0	Won (6–4, 4–6, 6–2) at 2019 Wimbledon
**(Estonia)** Anett Kontaveit	2–2	50%	1–2	–	1–0	Lost (3–6, 4–6) at 2021 Cluj
**(Spain) Paula Badosa**	1–1	50%	0–1	1–0	–	Lost (4–6, 3–6) at 2021 US Open
**(Czech Republic)** Petra Kvitová	1–2	33%	1–2	–	–	Lost (6–7, 2–6) at 2023 Australian Open
**(Czech Republic) Barbora Krejčíková**	0–1	0%	0–1	–	–	Lost (2–6, 6–4, 2–6) at 2015 Hobart
(United States) **Coco Gauff**	0–1	0%	–	0–1	–	Lost (1–6, 6–7) at 2022 French Open
(Poland) Agnieszka Radwańska	0–4	0%	0–2	0–2	–	Lost (3–6, 6–7) at 2018 Miami
Number 3 ranked players						
**(Greece) Maria Sakkari**	1–1	50%	–	0–1	1–0	Lost (4–6, 4–6) at 2019 Rabat
**(United States) Jessica Pegula**	0–1	0%	0–1	–	–	Lost (5–7, 3–6) at 2015 US Open
(United States) **Amanda Anisimova**	0–2	0%	0–1	–	0–1	Lost (6–3, 3–6, 6–7) at 2022 Bad Homburg
**(Ukraine) Elina Svitolina**	0–2	0%	0–1	–	0–1	Lost (3–6, 6–2, 3–6) at 2021 Wimbledon
Number 4 ranked players						
(Australia) Samantha Stosur	2–0	100%	–	1–0	1–0	Won (5–7, 7–6, 6–3) at 2018 Eastbourne
**(United States) Sofia Kenin**	2–2	50%	1–1	1–0	0–1	Lost (6–7, 7–6, 6–7) at 2020 Lyon
(Slovakia) Dominika Cibulková	1–1	50%	1–0	–	0–1	Won (6–3, 3–6, 7–5) at 2018 Budapest
(Netherlands) Kiki Bertens	1–1	50%	0–1	1–0	–	Lost (6–4, 3–6, 3–6) at 2019 Linz
**(France)** Caroline Garcia	1–2	33%	1–2	–	–	Lost (6–4, 3–6, 5–7) at 2022 Lyon
**(Switzerland) Belinda Bencic**	1–4	20%	1–1	0–1	0–2	Lost (4–6, 3–6) at 2019 Madrid
(Italy) Francesca Schiavone	0–1	0%	0–1	–	–	Lost (3–6, 6–3, 3–6) at 2014 Wuhan
(United Kingdom) Johanna Konta	0–2	0%	0–1	–	0–1	Lost (3–6, 6–7) at 2021 Nottingham
Number 5 ranked players						
**(Italy) Sara Errani**	2–0	100%	–	1–0	1–0	Won (6–4, 6–3) at 2022 Gaiba
**(Latvia) Jeļena Ostapenko**	1–0	100%	1–0	–	–	Won (6–2, 3–6, 6–1) at 2016 Fed Cup
(Slovakia) Daniela Hantuchová	1–1	50%	1–1	–	–	Lost (6–1, 3–6, 2–6) at 2016 Luxembourg
(Canada) Eugenie Bouchard	0–1	0%	0–1	–	–	Lost (4–6, 5–7) at 2016 Hobart
Number 6 ranked players						
(Czech Republic) **Linda Nosková**	1–0	100%	1–0	–	–	Won (7–6, 6–2) at 2023 Linz
(Spain) Carla Suárez Navarro	0–3	0%	0–3	–	–	Lost (2–6, 4–6) at 2017 Monterrey
Number 7 ranked players						
(Switzerland) Patty Schnyder	2–0	100%	1–0	1–0	–	Won (4–6, 6–4, 6–2) at 2017 Luxembourg
(Italy) Roberta Vinci	0–1	0%	0–1	–	–	Lost (2–6, 2–6) at 2015 Beijing
**(United States) Danielle Collins**	0–1	0%	0–1	–	–	Lost (5–7, 3–6) at 2021 Linz
Number 8 ranked players						
(Russia) Ekaterina Makarova	0–2	0%	0–1	–	0–1	Lost (3–6, 1–6) at 2017 Wimbledon
Number 9 ranked players						
(Switzerland) Timea Bacsinszky	0–1	0%	–	0–1	–	Lost (4–6, 5–7) at 2015 French Open
**(United States)** CoCo Vandeweghe	0–1	0%	0–1	–	–	Lost (6–7, 6–7) at 2014 Miami
(Germany) Andrea Petkovic	0–2	0%	0–2	–	–	Lost (3–6, 4–6) at 2018 Luxembourg
(Germany) Julia Görges	0–2	0%	0–1	0–1	–	Lost (5–7, 6–7) at 2018 French Open
**(Russia) Daria Kasatkina**	0–2	0%	–	–	0–2	Lost (7–6, 3–6, 2–6) at 2018 Wimbledon
Number 10 ranked players						
**(France) Kristina Mladenovic**	4–0	100%	3–0	1–0	–	Won (6–4, 6–4) at 2021 Limoges
**(Russia) Ekaterina Alexandrova**	1–0	100%	1–0	–	–	Won (3–6, 6–4, 7–6) at 2019 Budapest
(Ukraine) **Marta Kostyuk**	0–1	0%	0–1	–	–	Lost (6–4, 6–2, 6–1) at 2022 Miami Open
(United Kingdom) **Emma Raducanu**	0–2	0%	0–1	–	0–1	Lost (4–6, 4–6) at 2022 Wimbledon
**Total**	**36–66**	**35%**	**20–42 (32%)**	**8–9 (47%)**	**7–14 (33%)**	**current after the 2023 Australian Open**

=== Top 10 wins ===
#	Player	Rank	Event	Surface	Rd	Score
**2018**
1.	(Spain) Garbiñe Muguruza	No. 3	Wimbledon	Grass	2R	5–7, 6–2, 6–1
