= Hungarian Ladies Open =

Defunct tennis tournament
- Event name: Hungarian Ladies Open
- Founded: 2017
- Abolished: 2019
- Location: Budapest, Hungary
- Venue: SYMA Sports and Conference Centre
- Category: WTA International Tournaments
- Surface: Hard (indoor)
- Draw: 32S / 24Q / 16D
- Prize money: US$ 250,000 (2019)

The Hungarian Ladies Open was a women's tennis tournament held in Budapest, Hungary. This WTA Tour event was an International-level tournament and was played on indoor hardcourts.

== Past finals ==
=== Singles ===
Year	Champion	Runner-up	Score
2017	(Hungary) Tímea Babos	(Czech Republic) Lucie Šafářová	6–7 ^{(4–7)}, 6–4, 6–3
2018	(Belgium) Alison Van Uytvanck	(Slovakia) Dominika Cibulková	6–3, 3–6, 7–5
2019	(Belgium) Alison Van Uytvanck (2)	(Czech Republic) Markéta Vondroušová	1–6, 7–5, 6–2

=== Doubles ===
Year	Champions	Runners-up	Score
2017	(Chinese Taipei) Hsieh Su-wei (Georgia (country)) Oksana Kalashnikova	(Australia) Arina Rodionova (Kazakhstan) Galina Voskoboeva	6–3, 4–6, [10–4]
2018	(Spain) Georgina García Pérez (Hungary) Fanny Stollár	(Belgium) Kirsten Flipkens (Sweden) Johanna Larsson	4–6, 6–4, [10–3]
2019	(Russia) Ekaterina Alexandrova (Russia) Vera Zvonareva	(Hungary) Fanny Stollár (United Kingdom) Heather Watson	6–4, 4–6, [10–7]

== See also ==
- List of tennis tournaments
- Budapest Grand Prix
- Hungarian Pro Circuit Ladies Open
- Stella Artois Clay Court Championships
- Budapest Challenger (September)
- Budapest Challenger (May)
