= Georgina García Pérez =

Spanish tennis player (born 1992)

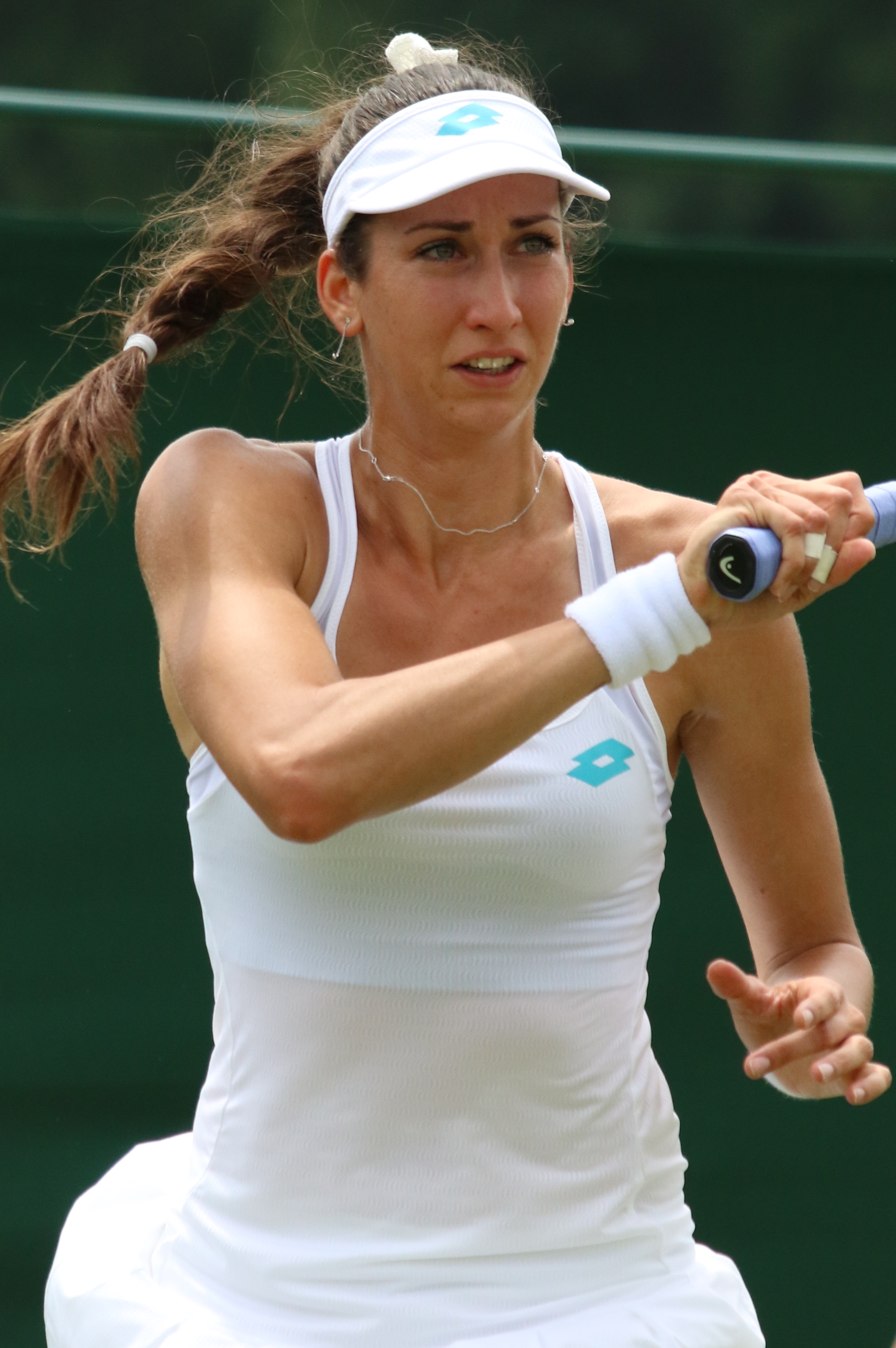
- García Pérez at the 2019 Wimbledon qualifying
- Country (sports): Spain
- Residence: Barcelona, Spain
- Born: 13 May 1992 (age 34) Barcelona
- Height: 1.87 m (6 ft 2 in)
- Plays: Right (two-handed backhand)
- Prize money: $702,540

Singles
- Career record: 344–269
- Career titles: 12 ITF
- Highest ranking: No. 124 (5 November 2018)
- Current ranking: No. 721 (21 September 2026)

Grand Slam singles results
- Australian Open: Q2 (2021)
- French Open: 2R (2018)
- Wimbledon: Q1 (2017, 2019, 2021)
- US Open: Q3 (2018, 2022)

Doubles
- Career record: 224–158
- Career titles: 1 WTA, 1 WTA Challenger
- Highest ranking: No. 71 (3 February 2020)
- Current ranking: No. 283 (26 October 2026)

Grand Slam doubles results
- Australian Open: 2R (2020)
- French Open: 1R (2021)
- Wimbledon: 2R (2018)

Team competitions
- Fed Cup: 4–1
- Last updated on: 29 October 2026.

Georgina García Pérez (Spanish pronunciation: [ɟʝoɾˈʝina ɣaɾˈθi.a ˈpeɾeθ]; (Note: In isolation, García is pronounced [ɡaɾˈθi.a].) born 13 May 1992) is a Spanish tennis player.

She has won one doubles title on the WTA Tour, and one doubles title on the WTA Challenger Tour, along with 12 singles and 23 doubles titles on the ITF Circuit. On 5 November 2018, she reached her best singles ranking of world No. 124. On 3 February 2020, she peaked at No. 71 in the WTA doubles rankings.

García Pérez hit the fastest women's serve on record at 220 km/h (136.7 mph) during the 2018 Hungarian Ladies Open.

She has represented Spain in Fed Cup since 2018, where she has a win–loss record of 4–1.

== Professional ==
=== 2014–2016 ===
After three years without stepping on a tennis court for personal reasons, Georgina returns to the circuit. Only a few months after her re-debut, she achieved her first professional titles. During 2015, she achieved two ITF titles, in Monzón and in Portugal.

García added another three ITF Circuit titles, plus four more titles in the doubles, which led her to debut on the WTA Tour at the 2016 Copa Colsanitas, partnering with Laura Pous Tió, but they lost their first-round match against Nicole Melichar and Rebecca Peterson.

=== 2017 ===
In 2017, she premiered on majors-level competing in qualifying draw at Wimbledon, falling in three sets to the American Sachia Vickery. A wrist injury prevented her from being active during the summer of 2017. At the end of the season, Georgina returned to the courts with the intention of adding the points needed to play the preview of the Australian Open and she was only one week away to be able to enter when winning the Pune tournament.

=== 2018 ===
Georgina started the season in the $60k tournament of Andrézieux, France, where she won the most important title of her career so far, defeating in the final former top 100, Arantxa Rus, by a score of 6–2, 6–0. The week after that title, García was summoned by the new captain Anabel Medina for the first time in her career to play a tie in Fed Cup. It would be against Italy on February 10 and 11, where she played the doubles match, winning against the Italian pair with María José Martínez Sánchez.

After overcoming the previous phase in the WTA Tour event in Budapest, going up two matches against Naomi Broady and the vetaran ex-top 10 Patty Schnyder, García played her first final of a tour-level tournament in which she fell to Aleksandra Krunić in two sets. In the second match of qualifying, Georgina produced a serve of 220 km/h, which is the fastest in the history of women's tennis, however, has yet to be verified by the WTA. In the same tournament in doubles, García managed to win her first WTA Tour title with her partner, the local player Fanny Stollár. They won a tough match, with a comeback included, in the super-tiebreak against the top-seeded pair formed by Johanna Larsson and Kirsten Flipkens. In May, she returned to play another final with Fanny Stollár at the Rabat WTA tournament, falling against Anna Blinkova and Raluca Olaru.

After the good start of the season, Georgina received a wildcard to play for the first time in the main draw of the Madrid Open. She lost her first-round match to Donna Vekić, in straight sets.

In June, she managed to overcome the previous phase of French Open and achieved her first victory in a Grand Slam tournament by defeating Dalila Jakupović. This victory led her to contest the second round against second seed and Australian Open winner, Caroline Wozniacki.

In July, García could not play the singles preview at Wimbledon for very few, but she did it in the doubles along with Fanny Stollár. They achieved the first victory in the final table of a major doubles competition, defeating Mandy Minella and Anastasija Sevastova. However, they would lose in the second round to the eventual finalists, Nicole Melichar and Květa Peschke.

In August, she made her first appearance at the US Open, and reached the final qualifying round but could not overcome Marie Bouzková.

== Grand Slam performance timelines ==
Key
W	F	SF	QF	#R	RR	Q#	P#	DNQ	A	Z#	PO	G	S	B	NMS	NTI	P	NH

(W) winner; (F) finalist; (SF) semifinalist; (QF) quarterfinalist; (#R) rounds 4, 3, 2, 1; (RR) round-robin stage; (Q#) qualification round; (P#) preliminary round; (DNQ) did not qualify; (A) absent; (Z#) Davis/Fed Cup Zonal Group (with number indication) or (PO) play-off; (G) gold, (S) silver or (B) bronze Olympic/Paralympic medal; (NMS) not a Masters tournament; (NTI) not a Tier I tournament; (P) postponed; (NH) not held; (SR) strike rate (events won / competed); (W–L) win–loss record.
To avoid confusion and double counting, these charts are updated at the conclusion of a tournament or when the player's participation has ended.

Only main-draw results in WTA Tour, Grand Slam tournaments, Fed Cup/Billie Jean King Cup and Olympic Games are included in win–loss records.

=== Singles ===
Current through the 2022 WTA Tour.

Tournament	2017	2018	2019	2020	2021	2022	SR	W–L
Australian Open	A	A	Q1	A	Q2	A	0 / 0	0–0
French Open	A	2R	Q3	A	Q1	Q1	0 / 1	1–1
Wimbledon	Q1	A	Q1	NH	Q1	A	0 / 0	0–0
US Open	A	Q3	Q2	A	A	Q3	0 / 0	0–0
Win–Loss	0–0	1–1	0–0	0–0	0–0	0–0	0 / 1	1–1
Career statistics
Tournaments	0	7	0	0	2	0	Career total: 9	
Overall win–loss	0–0	2–7	0–0	0–0	2–2	0–0	0 / 9	4–9
Year-end ranking	244	124	259	190	225	562	$702,540	

=== Doubles ===
Tournament	2018	2019	2020	2021	2022	SR	W–L
Australian Open	A	A	2R	1R	A	0 / 2	1–2
French Open	A	A	A	1R	A	0 / 1	0–1
Wimbledon	2R	A	NH	A	A	0 / 1	1–1
US Open	A	A	A	A	A	0 / 0	0–0
Win–Loss	1–1	0–0	1–1	0–2	0–0	0 / 4	2–4

== WTA Tour finals ==
=== Doubles: 3 (1 title, 2 runner-ups) ===
Legend WTA 500 WTA 250 (1–2)	Finals by surface Hard (1–0) Clay (0–2)

Result	W–L	Date	Tournament	Tier	Surface	Partner	Opponents	Score
Win	1–0	Feb 2018	Hungarian Ladies Open	International (Note: The WTA International tournaments were reclassified as WTA 250 tournaments in 2021.)	Hard (i)	(Hungary) Fanny Stollár	(Belgium) Kirsten Flipkens (Sweden) Johanna Larsson	4–6, 6–4, [10–3]
Loss	1–1	May 2018	Morocco Open	International	Clay	(Hungary) Fanny Stollár	(Russia) Anna Blinkova (Romania) Raluca Olaru	4–6, 4–6
Loss	1–2	May 2019	Morocco Open	International	Clay	(Georgia (country)) Oksana Kalashnikova	(Spain) María José Martínez Sánchez (Spain) Sara Sorribes Tormo	5–7, 1–6

== WTA 125 finals ==
=== Doubles: 1 (title) ===
Result	Date	Tournament	Surface	Partner	Opponent	Score
Win	Dec 2019	Open de Limoges, France	Hard (i)	(Spain) Sara Sorribes Tormo	(Russia) Ekaterina Alexandrova (Georgia (country)) Oksana Kalashnikova	6–2, 7–6^{(3)}

== ITF Circuit finals ==
=== Singles: 20 (12 titles, 8 runner-ups) ===
Legend $60,000 tournaments $25,000 tournaments $10/15,000 tournaments	Finals by surface Hard (7–2) Clay (5–4) Carpet (0–2)

Result	W–L	Date	Tournament	Date	Surface	Opponent	Score
Loss	0–1	May 2009	ITF Fuerteventura, Spain	10,000	Carpet	(Germany) Lena-Marie Hofmann	5–7, 4–6
Loss	0–2	Jun 2014	ITF Melilla, Spain	10,000	Hard	(Spain) Lucía Cervera Vázquez	6–4, 6–7^{(5)}, 6–7^{(14)}
Loss	0–3	Apr 2015	ITF Ponta Delgada, Portugal	10,000	Hard	(France) Julie Coin	0–6, 1–6
Win	1–3	Apr 2015	ITF Ponta Delgada, Portugal	10,000	Hard	(Netherlands) Kelly Versteeg	6–2, 6–1
Win	2–3	May 2015	Torneo Conchita Martínez, Spain	10,000	Hard	(Spain) Cristina Sánchez Quintanar	6–4, 6–2
Loss	2–4	Aug 2015	Internacional de Barcelona, Spain	15,000	Clay	(France) Myrtille Georges	3–6, 6–7^{(3)}
Win	3–4	Aug 2016	ITF Bükfürdő, Hungary	25,000	Clay	(Czech Republic) Gabriela Pantůčková	6–3, 6–0
Win	4–4	Oct 2016	ITF Casablanca, Morocco	10,000	Clay	(Oman) Fatma Al-Nabhani	6–4, 3–6, 6–2
Win	5–4	Nov 2016	ITF Rabat, Morocco	10,000	Clay	(Oman) Fatma Al-Nabhani	6–3, 2–6, 6–1
Win	6–4	Feb 2017	ITF Hammamet, Tunisia	15,000	Clay	(Switzerland) Jil Teichmann	7–5, 6–2
Loss	6–5	Apr 2017	ITF Pula, Italy	25,000	Clay	(Russia) Valentyna Ivakhnenko	5–7, 3–6
Loss	6–6	May 2017	ITF Lleida, Spain	25,000	Clay	(Spain) Olga Sáez Larra	4–6, 6–7^{(6)}
Win	7–6	May 2017	ITF Monzón, Spain	25,000	Hard	(Czech Republic) Marie Bouzková	6–1, 6–3
Win	8–6	May 2017	Solgironès Open, Spain	25,000	Clay	(Spain) Estrella Cabeza Candela	6–2, 0–6, 6–4
Win	9–6	Dec 2017	ITF Pune, India	25,000	Hard	(United Kingdom) Katy Dunne	6–4, 7–5
Win	10–6	Jan 2018	Open Andrézieux-Bouthéon, France	60,000	Hard (i)	(Netherlands) Arantxa Rus	6–2, 6–0
Win	11–6	Sep 2020	ITF Figueira da Foz, Portugal	W25	Hard	(Brazil) Beatriz Haddad Maia	6–7^{(10)}, 7–5, 6–4
Loss	11–7	Sep 2020	Přerov Cup, Czech Republic	W25	Clay	(United States) Grace Min	3–6, 6–0, 5–7
Win	12–7	Oct 2020	ITF Porto, Portugal	W25	Hard	(Portugal) Francisca Jorge	1–6, 6–4, 6–3
Loss	12–8	May 2023	ITF Tossa de Mar, Spain	W25+H	Carpet	(Malta) Francesca Curmi	2–6, 6–7^{(2)}

=== Doubles: 41 (23 titles, 18 runner-ups) ===
Legend W100 tournaments W60/75 tournaments W50 tournaments W25/35 tournaments W10/15 tournaments	Finals by surface Hard (7–9) Clay (14–8) Carpet (2–1)

Result	W–L	Date	Tournament	Tier	Surface	Partner	Opponents	Score
Loss	0–1	May 2009	ITF Fuerteventura, Spain	10k	Carpet	(Belgium) Majoly de Wilde	(United Kingdom) Danielle Brown (United Kingdom) Elizabeth Thomas	4–6, 4–6
Loss	0–2	Jul 2010	ITF Cáceres, Spain	10k	Hard	(Germany) Kim Grajdek	(Australia) Jade Hopper (France) Victoria Larrière	5–7, 4–6
Loss	0–3	Sep 2011	ITF Madrid, Spain	10k	Hard	(Spain) Rocío de la Torre Sánchez	(United Kingdom) Anna Fitzpatrick (United Kingdom) Jade Windley	6–1, 0–6, [8–10]
Loss	0–4	Sep 2011	ITF Madrid, Spain	10k	Hard	(Spain) Rocío de la Torre Sánchez	(Italy) Evelyn Mayr (Italy) Julia Mayr	1–6, 4–6
Win	1–4	Sep 2011	ITF Madrid, Spain	25k	Clay	(Spain) Rocío de la Torre Sánchez	(Netherlands) Kiki Bertens (Belgium) Elyne Boeykens	5–7, 6–4, [10–8]
Win	2–4	Nov 2014	ITF Casablanca, Morocco	10k	Clay	(Spain) Olga Parres Azcoitia	(Croatia) Tea Faber (Croatia) Silvia Njirić	6–2, 6–4
Win	3–4	Nov 2014	ITF Casablanca, Morocco	10k	Clay	(Spain) Olga Parres Azcoitia	(United Kingdom) Manisha Foster (Switzerland) Lisa Sabino	1–6, 7–6^{(2)}, [10–7]
Loss	3–5	Apr 2015	ITF Ponta Delgada, Portugal	10k	Hard	(Spain) Olga Parres Azcoitia	(Portugal) Maria Palhoto (Ecuador) Charlotte Römer	5–7, 6–3, [0–10]
Win	4–5	May 2015	Torneo Conchita Martínez, Spain	10k	Hard	(Spain) Olga Parres Azcoitia	(Turkey) Başak Eraydın (United Kingdom) Francesca Stephenson	6–4, 6–2
Loss	4–6	Feb 2016	ITF Tarragona, Spain	10k	Clay	(Spain) Olga Sáez Larra	(Romania) Irina Bara (Ukraine) Alyona Sotnikova	5–7, 6–3, [8–10]
Loss	4–7	Mar 2016	ITF Le Havre, France	10k	Clay (i)	(Latvia) Diāna Marcinkēviča	(United States) Bernarda Pera (United States) Sabrina Santamaria	2–6, 2–6
Win	5–7	Jul 2016	Budapest Ladies Open, Hungary	100k	Clay	(Bosnia and Herzegovina) Ema Burgić Bucko	(Czech Republic) Lenka Kunčíková (Czech Republic) Karolína Stuchlá	6–4, 2–6, [12–10]
Loss	5–8	Aug 2016	ITF Plzeň, Czech Republic	25k	Clay	(Bosnia and Herzegovina) Ema Burgić Bucko	(Poland) Katarzyna Kawa (Sweden) Cornelia Lister	1–6, 6–7^{(6)}
Win	6–8	Aug 2016	ITF Bükfürdő, Hungary	25k	Clay	(Hungary) Fanny Stollár	(Hungary) Dalma Gálfi (Hungary) Réka Luca Jani	6–3, 7–6^{(4)}
Win	7–8	Aug 2016	ITF Barcelona, Spain	25k	Clay	(Venezuela) Andrea Gámiz	(Italy) Alice Matteucci (Switzerland) Jil Teichmann	6–2, 7–5
Win	8–8	Sep 2016	ITF Clermont-Ferrand, France	25k	Hard (i)	(Spain) Olga Sáez Larra	(France) Manon Arcangioli (Croatia) Silvia Njirić	6–2, 3–6, [10–2]
Loss	8–9	Oct 2016	ITF Casablanca, Morocco	10k	Clay	(Bulgaria) Julia Stamatova	(Romania) Daiana Negreanu (Romania) Oana Georgeta Simion	5–7, 7–5, [10–12]
Win	9–9	Apr 2017	ITF Pula, Italy	25k	Clay	(United States) Bernarda Pera	(Italy) Cristiana Ferrando (Italy) Camilla Rosatello	6–4, 6–3
Win	10–9	May 2017	ITF Lleida, Spain	25k	Clay	(Venezuela) Andrea Gámiz	(Belarus) Vera Lapko (Bulgaria) Aleksandrina Naydenova	6–1, 4–6, [10–8]
Win	11–9	May 2017	Torneo Conchita Martínez, Spain	25k	Hard	(Venezuela) Andrea Gámiz	(Georgia (country)) Sofia Shapatava (Ukraine) Valeriya Strakhova	6–3, 6–4
Loss	11–10	Nov 2017	Open de Valencia, Spain	25k	Clay	(Venezuela) Andrea Gámiz	(Spain) Cristina Bucșa (Russia) Yana Sizikova	6–7^{(1)}, 6–7^{(5)}
Win	12–10	Dec 2017	ITF Navi Mumbai, India	25k	Hard	(Latvia) Diāna Marcinkēviča	(India) Pranjala Yadlapalli (Slovenia) Tamara Zidanšek	6–0, 6–1
Win	13–10	Apr 2019	ITF Óbidos, Portugal	W25	Carpet	(Spain) Cristina Bucșa	(Georgia (country)) Sofia Shapatava (United Kingdom) Emily Webley-Smith	7–5, 7–5
Loss	13–11	May 2019	Solgironès Open, Spain	W60	Clay	(Hungary) Dalma Gálfi	(Australia) Arina Rodionova (Australia) Storm Sanders	4–6, 4–6
Win	14–11	Jul 2019	Contrexéville Open, France	W100	Clay	(Georgia (country)) Oksana Kalashnikova	(Kazakhstan) Anna Danilina (Netherlands) Eva Wacanno	6–3, 6–3
Win	15–11	Aug 2019	ITF Bad Saulgau, Germany	W25	Clay	(Spain) Sara Sorribes Tormo	(Russia) Ksenia Laskutova (Russia) Marina Melnikova	6–3, 6–1
Loss	15–12	Aug 2019	Ladies Open Hechingen, Germany	W60	Clay	(Serbia) Olga Danilović	(Romania) Cristina Dinu (North Macedonia) Lina Gjorcheska	6–4, 5–7, [7–10]
Win	16–12	Oct 2019	Kiskút Open, Hungary	W100	Clay (i)	(Hungary) Fanny Stollár	(Slovenia) Nina Potočnik (Slovenia) Nika Radišič	6–1, 7–6^{(4)}
Win	17–12	Nov 2019	Centenario Open, Paraguay	W60	Clay	(Venezuela) Andrea Gámiz	(Kazakhstan) Anna Danilina (Switzerland) Conny Perrin	6–4, 3–6, [10–3]
Loss	17–13	Nov 2019	Dubai Tennis Challenge, UAE	W100+H	Clay	(Spain) Sara Sorribes Tormo	(Czech Republic) Lucie Hradecká (Slovenia) Andreja Klepač	5–7, 6–3, [8–10]
Win	18–13	Mar 2022	ITF Le Havre, France	W25	Clay	(Spain) Cristina Bucșa	(Latvia) Diāna Marcinkēviča (United States) Chiara Scholl	6–4, 6–3
Loss	18–14	Mar 2023	Wiphold International, South Africa	W25	Hard	(Hungary) Tímea Babos	(United States) Emina Bektas (Israel) Lina Glushko	3–6, 6–4, [11–13]
Loss	18–15	Apr 2023	Kōfu International Open, Japan	W25	Hard	(Japan) Eri Hozumi	(South Korea) Han Na-lae (South Korea) Jang Su-jeong	0–6, 4–6
Win	19–15	May 2023	ITF Tossa de Mar, Spain	W25	Carpet	(Switzerland) Conny Perrin	(Greece) Martha Matoula (Romania) Arina Vasilescu	4–6, 6–3, [10–7]
Loss	19–16	May 2023	Torneo Conchita Martínez, Spain	W25	Hard	(Spain) Laura García Astudillo	(Luxembourg) Marie Weckerle (Australia) Gabriella Da Silva-Fick	2–6, 1–6
Win	20–16	Jun 2023	ITF Yecla, Spain	W25	Hard	(Serbia) Katarina Kozarov	(Italy) Nicole Fossa Huergo (United Kingdom) Matilda Mutavdzic	6–3, 6–4
Win	21–16	Jun 2023	Guimarães Ladies Open, Portugal	W25	Hard	(Australia) Petra Hule	(Portugal) Francisca Jorge (Portugal) Matilde Jorge	6–4, 7–5
Loss	21–17	Jun 2026	ITF Madrid, Spain	W15	Clay	(Belgium) Margaux Maquet	(Spain) Alice Ferlito (Spain) Juliana Giaccio	4–6, 3–6
Loss	21–18	Jun 2026	ITF Tauste, Spain	W35+H	Hard	(Spain) Alice Ferlito	(China) Qu Yihan (China) Shao Yushan	4–6, 5–7
Win	22–18	Jun 2026	ITF Gdańsk, Poland	W50	Clay	(Poland) Weronika Falkowska	(Kazakhstan) Zhibek Kulambayeva (Hungary) Amarissa Tóth	3–6, 7–5, [11–9]
Win	23–18	Sep 2026	ITF Yecla, Spain	W50	Hard	(Serbia) Elena Milovanović	(United States) Carson Tanguilig (Latvia) Elza Tomase	2–6, 6–4, [12–10]
