= Fanny Stollár =

Hungarian tennis player (born 1998)

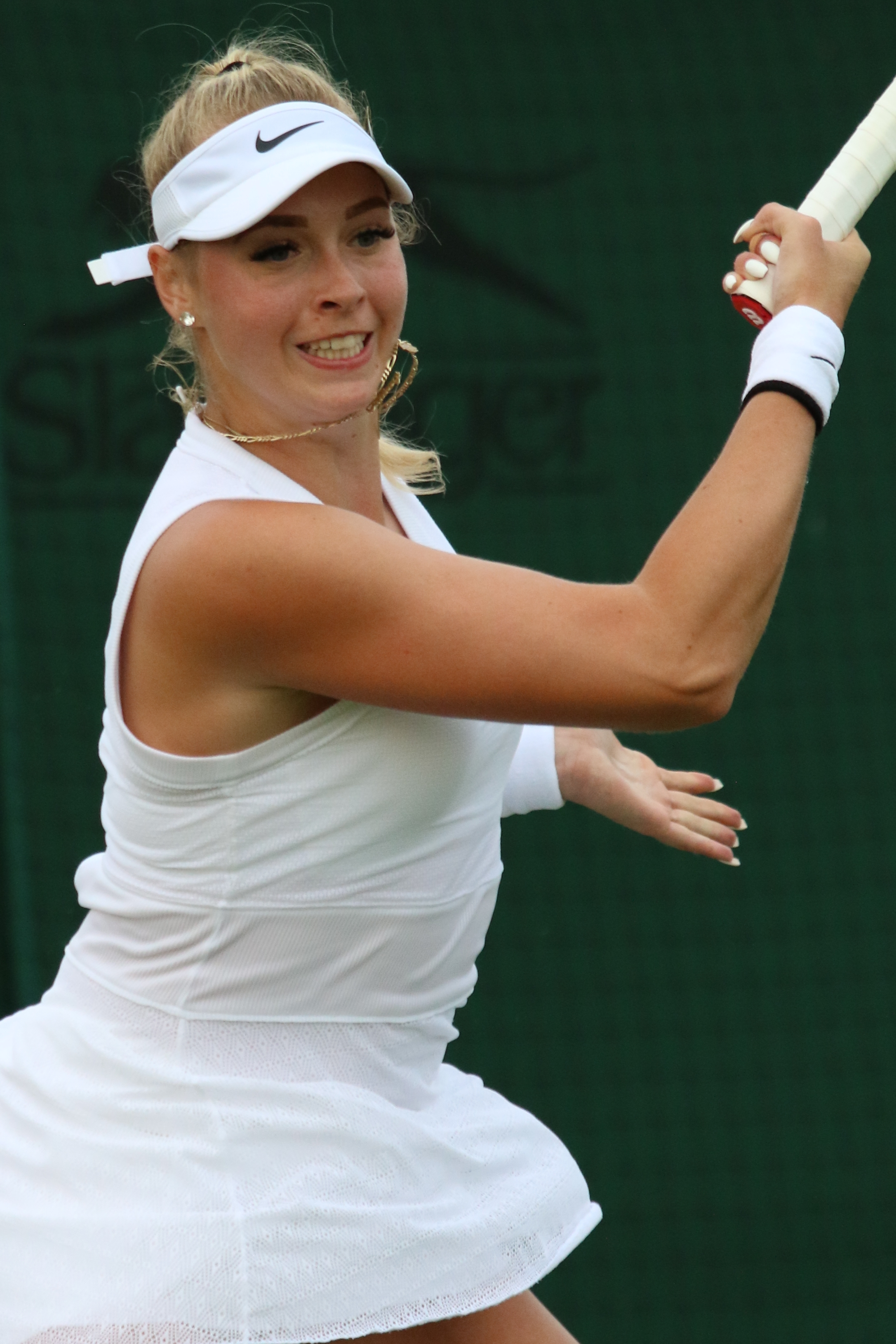
- Stollár during the 2019 Wimbledon qualifying
- Country (sports): Hungary
- Born: 12 November 1998 (age 27) Budapest, Hungary
- Height: 1.72 m (5 ft 8 in)
- Plays: Right (two-handed backhand)
- Prize money: $1,162,522

Singles
- Career record: 198–177
- Career titles: 2 ITF
- Highest ranking: No. 114 (19 November 2018)

Grand Slam singles results
- Australian Open: Q2 (2019)
- French Open: Q1 (2017, 2019)
- Wimbledon: Q2 (2019)
- US Open: Q2 (2017, 2018)

Doubles
- Career record: 233–132
- Career titles: 6
- Highest ranking: No. 25 (13 October 2025)
- Current ranking: No. 43 (9 November 2026)

Grand Slam doubles results
- Australian Open: 3R (2026)
- French Open: 1R (2020, 2025, 2026)
- Wimbledon: 3R (2025, 2026)
- US Open: 3R (2025)

Grand Slam mixed doubles results
- Australian Open: 1R (2026)
- French Open: 2R (2026)
- Wimbledon: SF (2026)

Team competitions
- Fed Cup: 11–2
Medal record
Representing a Mixed-NOCs team
Youth Olympic Games
Bronze medal – third place	2014 Nanjing	Mixed doubles
- Last updated on: 9 November 2026.

Fanny Stollár (born 12 November 1998) is a Hungarian tennis player. She reached her best doubles ranking of No. 25 on 13 October 2025. Stollár has won six doubles titles on the WTA Tour and four on the WTA Challenger Tour, along with two singles and 15 doubles titles on the ITF Women's Circuit. On 19 November 2018, she peaked at No. 114 in the WTA singles rankings.

Playing for Hungary Fed Cup team, Stollár has a win–loss record of 11–2 (as of June 2025).

== Career ==
=== 2015: Wimbledon junior doubles champion ===
In 2015, Stollár won the Wimbledon girls' doubles title, partnering with Dalma Gálfi.

=== 2017-2020: First career title and major debut in doubles ===
Stollár defeated sixth seed Johanna Konta in straight sets in the second round of the WTA Tour event at the 2018 Charleston Open, before losing to eventual champion Kiki Bertens. Stollar had played two singles qualifying matches and beaten Francesca Di Lorenzo in the first round.

Her biggest doubles title, thus far, came at the 2018 Hungarian Ladies Open, where together with Spanish player Georgina García Pérez defeated Kirsten Flipkens and Johanna Larsson in three sets.

=== 2021–2024: Three titles at the Budapest Grand Prix ===
She won her second doubles title in 2021, also at the Budapest Grand Prix, partnering Mihaela Buzărnescu.

Partnered with Katarzyna Piter, she also won the doubles title at the 2023 Budapest Grand Prix, defeating Jessie Aney and Anna Sisková in a champions tiebreak in the final. The pair defended their title in Budapest the following year 2024, beating Anna Danilina and Irina Khromacheva in the final which again went to a deciding champions tiebreak.

Stollár and Piter were runners-up at the 2024 Guangzhou Open, losing to top seeds Kateřina Siniaková and Zhang Shuai in the final. They also lost the final at the Jiangxi Open, this time to Guo Hanyu and Moyuka Uchijima.

=== 2025–2026: First grass-court title, WTA 1000 final ===
Partnering with Monica Niculescu, Stollár reached the doubles final at the 2025 Hobart International, losing to Jiang Xinyu and Wu Fang-hsien.

Alongside Irina Khromacheva, she won the WTA 125 Trophée Clarins, defeating Tereza Mihalíková and Olivia Nicholls in the final.

Playing again with Khromacheva, Stollár won her first grass-court title at the Rosmalen Open, defeating Nicole Melichar-Martinez and Liudmila Samsonova in the final.

Teaming up with Miyu Kato, she reached her first WTA 1000 final at the 2025 China Open, losing to second seeds Sara Errani and Jasmine Paolini in a deciding champions tiebreak.

In October 2026 at the Ningbo Open, Stollár teamed with Desirae Krawczyk to win the title defeating top seeds Nicole Melichar-Martinez and Cristina Bucșa in the final.

== Personal life and background ==
Stollár started playing tennis aged three. She stated that her favorite surface is hardcourt.

== Performance timelines ==
Key
W	F	SF	QF	#R	RR	Q#	DNQ	A	NH

(W) winner; (F) finalist; (SF) semifinalist; (QF) quarterfinalist; (#R) rounds 4, 3, 2, 1; (RR) round-robin stage; (Q#) qualification round; (DNQ) did not qualify; (A) absent; (NH) not held; (SR) strike rate (events won / competed); (W–L) win–loss record.
To avoid confusion and double counting, these charts are updated at the conclusion of a tournament or when the player's participation has ended.

Only main-draw results in WTA Tour, Grand Slam tournaments, Fed Cup/Billie Jean King Cup and Olympic Games are included in win–loss records.

=== Singles ===
Current through the 2022 season.

Tournament	2015	2016	2017	2018	2019	2020	2021	2022	W–L
Grand Slam tournaments
Australian Open	A	A	A	Q1	Q2	A	A	A	0–0
French Open	A	A	Q1	A	Q1	A	A	A	0–0
Wimbledon	A	A	Q1	Q1	Q2	NH	A	A	0–0
US Open	A	A	Q2	Q2	Q1	A	A	A	0–0
Win–Loss	0–0	0–0	0–0	0–0	0–0	0–0	0–0	0–0	0–0
WTA 1000
Indian Wells Open	A	A	A	A	Q1	NH	A	A	0–0
Miami Open	Q1	Q2	A	A	Q1	NH	A	A	0–0
Career statistics
Tournaments	0	0	3	7	3	0	0	0	Total: 13
Overall win–loss	0–0	0–0	3–3	8–7	1–3	0–0	0–0	0–0	12–13
Year-end ranking	523	287	241	127	331	359	376	462	$385,414

=== Doubles ===
Tournament	2018	2019	2020	...	2025	2026	SR	W–L	Win%
Australian Open	A	A	1R		1R	3R	0 / 3	2–3	40%
French Open	A	A	1R		1R	1R	0 / 3	0–3	0%
Wimbledon	2R	1R	NH		3R	3R	0 / 4	5–4	56%
US Open	2R	2R	A		3R	2R	0 / 4	5–4	56%
Win–Loss	2–2	1–2	0–2		4–4	5–4	0 / 14	12–14	46%

== WTA 1000 finals ==
=== Doubles: 1 (runner-up) ===
Result	Year	Tournament	Surface	Partner	Opponents	Score
Loss	2025	China Open	Hard	(Japan) Miyu Kato	(Italy) Sara Errani (Italy) Jasmine Paolini	7–6^{(7–1)}, 3–6, [2–10]

== WTA Tour finals ==
=== Doubles: 13 (6 titles, 7 runner-ups) ===
Legend WTA 1000 (0–1) WTA 500 (1–0) WTA 250 (5–6)	Finals by surface Hard (2–6) Clay (3–1) Grass (1–0)

Result	W–L	Date	Tournament	Tier	Surface	Partner	Opponents	Score
Win	1–0	Feb 2018	Hungarian Ladies Open, Hungary	International (Note: The WTA International tournaments were reclassified as WTA 250 tournaments in 2021.)	Hard (i)	(Spain) Georgina García Pérez	(Belgium) Kirsten Flipkens (Sweden) Johanna Larsson	4–6, 6–4, [10–3]
Loss	1–1	May 2018	Rabat Grand Prix, Morocco	International	Clay	(Spain) Georgina García Pérez	(Russia) Anna Blinkova (Romania) Raluca Olaru	4–6, 4–6
Loss	1–2	Feb 2019	Hungarian Ladies Open	International	Hard (i)	(United Kingdom) Heather Watson	(Russia) Ekaterina Alexandrova (Russia) Vera Zvonareva	6–4, 4–6, [7–10]
Loss	1–3	Aug 2019	Washington Open, US	International	Hard	(United States) Maria Sanchez	(United States) Coco Gauff (United States) Caty McNally	2–6, 2–6
Win	2–3	Jul 2021	Budapest Grand Prix, Hungary	WTA 250	Clay	(Romania) Mihaela Buzărnescu	(Spain) Aliona Bolsova (Germany) Tamara Korpatsch	6–4, 6–4
Win	3–3	Jul 2023	Budapest Grand Prix (2)	WTA 250	Clay	(Poland) Katarzyna Piter	(United States) Jessie Aney (Czech Republic) Anna Sisková	6–2, 4–6, [10–4]
Win	4–3	Jul 2024	Budapest Grand Prix (3)	WTA 250	Clay	(Poland) Katarzyna Piter	(Kazakhstan) Anna Danilina (Russia) Irina Khromacheva	6–3, 3–6, [10–3]
Loss	4–4	Oct 2024	Guangzhou Open, China	WTA 250	Hard	(Poland) Katarzyna Piter	(Czech Republic) Kateřina Siniaková (China) Zhang Shuai	4–6, 1–6
Loss	4–5	Oct 2024	Jiangxi Open, China	WTA 250	Hard	(Poland) Katarzyna Piter	(China) Guo Hanyu (Japan) Moyuka Uchijima	6–7^{(5–7)}, 5–7
Loss	4–6	Jan 2025	Hobart International, Australia	WTA 250	Hard	(Romania) Monica Niculescu	(China) Jiang Xinyu (Chinese Taipei) Wu Fang-Hsien	1–6, 6–7^{(6–8)}
Win	5–6	Jun 2025	Rosmalen Open, Netherlands	WTA 250	Grass	(Russia) Irina Khromacheva	(United States) Nicole Melichar (Russia) Liudmila Samsonova	7–5, 6–3
Loss	5–7	Oct 2025	China Open, China	WTA 1000	Hard	(Japan) Miyu Kato	(Italy) Sara Errani (Italy) Jasmine Paolini	7–6^{(7–1)}, 3–6, [2–10]
Win	6–7	Oct 2026	Ningbo Open, China	WTA 500	Hard	(United States) Desirae Krawczyk	(United States) Nicole Melichar-Martinez (Spain) Cristina Bucșa	7–6^{(7–5)}, 5–7, [10–6]

== WTA 125 finals ==
=== Doubles: 4 (4 titles) ===
Result	W–L	Date	Tournament	Surface	Partner	Opponents	Score
Win	1–0	Mar 2019	Abierto Zapopan, Mexico	Hard	(United States) Maria Sanchez	(Sweden) Cornelia Lister (Czech Republic) Renata Voráčová	7–5, 6–1
Win	2–0	Jun 2024	Internacional de Valencia, Spain	Clay	(Poland) Katarzyna Piter	(Italy) Angelica Moratelli (Mexico) Renata Zarazúa	6–1, 4–6, [10–8]
Win	3–0	Sep 2024	Abierto Zapopan, Mexico	Hard	(Poland) Katarzyna Piter	(Italy) Angelica Moratelli (United States) Sabrina Santamaria	6–4, 7–5
Win	4–0	May 2025	Clarins Open, France	Clay	(Russia) Irina Khromacheva	(Slovakia) Tereza Mihalíková (United Kingdom) Olivia Nicholls	4–6, 7–6^{(5)}, [10–5]

== ITF Circuit finals ==
=== Singles: 7 (2 titles, 5 runner-ups) ===
Legend $60,000 tournaments (0–1) $25,000 tournaments (1–3) $10,000 tournaments (1–1)	Finals by surface Hard (0–2) Clay (2–3)

Result	W–L	Date	Tournament	Tier	Surface	Opponent	Score
Loss	0–1	Mar 2015	ITF Orlando, United States	10,000	Clay	(United States) Claire Liu	1–6, 3–6
Win	1–1	May 2015	ITF Galați, Romania	10,000	Clay	(Romania) Georgia Crăciun	2–6, 6–4, 7–5
Loss	1–2	May 2018	ITF Rome, Italy	25,000	Clay	(Italy) Martina di Giuseppe	5–7, 6–7^{(4)}
Loss	1–3	Jul 2021	ITF Kyiv, Ukraine	W25	Clay	(France) Chloé Paquet	6–7^{(3)}, 6–3, 4–6
Loss	1–4	Aug 2021	ITF Ourense, Spain	W25	Hard	(Australia) Jaimee Fourlis	6–7^{(3)}, 3–6
Win	2–4	May 2023	ITF Orlando, United States	W25	Clay	(United States) Dalayna Hewitt	7–6^{(4)}, 6–2
Loss	2–5	Oct 2023	Challenger de Saguenay, Canada	W60	Hard (i)	(Canada) Katherine Sebov	4–6, 4–6

=== Doubles: 22 (15 titles, 7 runner-ups) ===
Legend $100,000 tournaments (3–0) $50/60,000 tournaments (2–3) $40,000 tournaments (0–2) $25,000 tournaments (8–2) $10,000 tournaments (2–0)	Finals by surface Hard (6–5) Clay (9–2)

Result	W–L	Date	Tournament	Tier	Surface	Partner	Opponents	Score
Win	1–0	Mar 2015	ITF Gainesville, US	10,000	Clay	(United States) Ingrid Neel	(United States) Sofia Kenin (United States) Marie Norris	6–3, 6–3
Win	2–0	Mar 2015	ITF Orlando, US	10,000	Clay	(United States) Ingrid Neel	(Czech Republic) Kateřina Kramperová (United States) Katerina Stewart	6–3, 7–6^{(4)}
Loss	2–1	Oct 2015	Toronto Challenger, Canada	50,000	Hard (i)	(United States) Kristie Ahn	(Canada) Sharon Fichman (United States) Maria Sanchez	2–6, 7–6^{(6)}, [6–10]
Win	3–1	Feb 2016	ITF Cuernavaca, Mexico	25,000	Hard	(Bulgaria) Aleksandrina Naydenova	(Ukraine) Elizaveta Ianchuk (Czech Republic) Kateřina Kramperová	6–3, 6–2
Win	4–1	Aug 2016	ITF Bükfürdő, Hungary	25,000	Clay	(Spain) Georgina García Pérez	(Hungary) Dalma Gálfi (Hungary) Réka Luca Jani	6–3, 7–6^{(4)}
Win	5–1	Mar 2017	ITF Mornington, Australia	25,000	Clay	(Australia) Priscilla Hon	(Australia) Jessica Moore (Thailand) Varatchaya Wongteanchai	6–1, 7–5
Win	6–1	Mar 2018	Yokohama Challenger, Japan	25,000	Hard	(United Kingdom) Laura Robson	(Japan) Momoko Kobori (Japan) Chihiro Muramatsu	5–7, 6–1, [10–4]
Win	7–1	Oct 2019	Kiskút Open, Hungary	W100	Clay (i)	(Spain) Georgina García Pérez	(Slovenia) Nina Potočnik (Slovenia) Nika Radišič	6–1, 7–6^{(4)}
Win	8–1	Mar 2020	ITF Potchefstroom, South Africa	W25	Hard	(United Kingdom) Samantha Murray Sharan	(Turkey) Berfu Cengiz (New Zealand) Paige Hourigan	6–1, 6–1
Win	9–1	Sep 2020	Grado Tennis Cup, Italy	W25	Clay	(Hungary) Anna Bondár	(Italy) Federica di Sarra (Italy) Camilla Rosatello	7–5, 6–2
Win	10–1	Jun 2021	Charleston Pro, US	W60	Clay	(Indonesia) Aldila Sutjiadi	(United States) Rasheeda McAdoo (United States) Peyton Stearns	6–0, 6–4
Loss	10–2	Jun 2022	ITF Ra'anana, Israel	W25	Hard	(Romania) Elena-Teodora Cadar	(Russia) Sofya Lansere (Russia) Maria Timofeeva	3–6, 6–7^{(5)}
Win	11–2	Jul 2022	ITF Palma del Río, Spain	W25+H	Hard	(Russia) Valeria Savinykh	(Spain) Celia Cerviño Ruiz (Lithuania) Justina Mikulskytė	7–6^{(3)}, 6–2
Win	12–2	Feb 2023	Georgia's Rome Open, US	W60	Hard (i)	(Switzerland) Lulu Sun	(Japan) Mana Ayukawa (Czech Republic) Gabriela Knutson	6–3, 6–0
Win	13–2	Mar 2023	ITF Toronto, Canada	W25	Hard (i)	(Norway) Ulrikke Eikeri	(United States) Maya Joint (United States) Mia Yamakita	7–6^{(6)}, 6–0
Loss	13–3	Apr 2023	ITF Boca Raton, US	W25	Clay	(United States) Sofia Sewing	(United States) Makenna Jones (United States) Jamie Loeb	7–5, 3–6, [8–10]
Loss	13–4	Apr 2023	Charlottesville Open, US	W60	Clay	(Japan) Nao Hibino	(United States) Sophie Chang (China) Yuan Yue	3–6, 3–6
Loss	13–5	Jan 2024	Pune Open, India	W40	Hard	(United Kingdom) Naiktha Bains	(Philippines) Alexandra Eala (Latvia) Darja Semeņistaja	6–7^{(8)}, 3–6
Loss	13–6	Jan 2024	Trnava Indoor, Slovakia	W50	Hard (i)	(Poland) Weronika Falkowska	(New Zealand) Lulu Sun (Japan) Moyuka Uchijima	4–6, 6–7^{(3)}
Loss	13–7	Mar 2024	ITF Ricany, US	W75	Hard	(New Zealand) Lulu Sun	(Czech Republic) Gabriela Knutson (Czech Republic) Tereza Valentová	4–6, 6–3, [4–10]
Win	14–7	May 2024	Bonita Springs Championship, US	W100	Clay	(New Zealand) Lulu Sun	(Greece) Valentini Grammatikopoulou (Ukraine) Valeriya Strakhova	6–4, 7–5
Win	15–7	Aug 2024	ITF Maspalomas, Spain	W100	Clay	(Poland) Katarzyna Piter	(Italy) Angelica Moratelli (United States) Sabrina Santamaria	6–4, 6–2

== Junior Grand Slam tournament finals ==
=== Doubles: 1 (title) ===
Result	Year	Tournament	Surface	Partner	Opponents	Score
Win	2015	Wimbledon	Grass	(Hungary) Dalma Gálfi	(Belarus) Vera Lapko (Slovakia) Tereza Mihalíková	6–3, 6–2
