= 2014 WTA 125K series =

Details
- Duration: July 21, 2014 – November 9, 2014
- Edition: 3rd
- Tournaments: 5

Achievements (singles)

The WTA 125K series is the secondary professional tennis circuit organised by the Women's Tennis Association. The 2014 WTA 125K series calendar consists of five tournaments, each with a total prize fund of $125,000. After 2013, both the Cali, and Nanjing events folded, with Nanjing being replaced by a tournament in Nanchang, and a new event starting in Limoges, France.

== Schedule ==
Week of	Tournament	Champions	Runners-up	Semifinalists	Quarterfinalists
July 21	Jiangxi International Women's Tennis Open; Nanchang, China; Hard – $125,000 – 32S/16Q/16D; Singles – Doubles	(China) Peng Shuai; 6–2, 3–6, 6–3	(China) Liu Fangzhou	(China) Zheng Saisai (Thailand) Luksika Kumkhum	(China) Wang Qiang (Japan) Misaki Doi (China) Wang Yafan (Hong Kong) Zhang Ling
July 21	Jiangxi International Women's Tennis Open; Nanchang, China; Hard – $125,000 – 32S/16Q/16D; Singles – Doubles	(Chinese Taipei) Chuang Chia-jung (Japan) Junri Namigata; 7–6^{(7–4)}, 6–3	(Chinese Taipei) Chan Chin-wei (China) Xu Yifan	(China) Zheng Saisai (Thailand) Luksika Kumkhum	(China) Wang Qiang (Japan) Misaki Doi (China) Wang Yafan (Hong Kong) Zhang Ling
September 1	Huangcangyu WTA Suzhou Ladies Open; Suzhou, China; Hard – $125,000 – 32S/0Q/16D; Singles – Doubles	(Germany) Anna-Lena Friedsam; 6–1, 6–3	(China) Duan Yingying	(Slovakia) Jana Čepelová (Japan) Misa Eguchi	(China) Zheng Saisai (Ukraine) Kateryna Kozlova (Japan) Risa Ozaki (Austria) Patricia Mayr-Achleitner
September 1	Huangcangyu WTA Suzhou Ladies Open; Suzhou, China; Hard – $125,000 – 32S/0Q/16D; Singles – Doubles	(Chinese Taipei) Chan Chin-wei (Chinese Taipei) Chuang Chia-jung; 6–1, 3–6, [10–7]	(Japan) Misa Eguchi (Japan) Eri Hozumi	(Slovakia) Jana Čepelová (Japan) Misa Eguchi	(China) Zheng Saisai (Ukraine) Kateryna Kozlova (Japan) Risa Ozaki (Austria) Patricia Mayr-Achleitner
October 27	Ningbo International Women's Tennis Open; Ningbo, China; Hard – $125,000 – 32S/16Q/16D; Singles – Doubles	(Poland) Magda Linette; 3–6, 7–5, 6–1	(China) Wang Qiang	(China) Duan Yingying (Poland) Paula Kania	(Russia) Ekaterina Bychkova (China) Zhu Lin (China) Wang Yan (China) Zheng Saisai
October 27	Ningbo International Women's Tennis Open; Ningbo, China; Hard – $125,000 – 32S/16Q/16D; Singles – Doubles	(Australia) Arina Rodionova (Ukraine) Olga Savchuk; 4–6, 7–6^{(7–2)}, [10–6]	(China) Han Xinyun (China) Zhang Kailin	(China) Duan Yingying (Poland) Paula Kania	(Russia) Ekaterina Bychkova (China) Zhu Lin (China) Wang Yan (China) Zheng Saisai
November 3	OEC Taipei WTA Challenger; Taipei, Taiwan $125,000 – carpet (indoor) – 32S/16Q/16D; Singles – Doubles	(Russia) Vitalia Diatchenko; 1–6, 6–2, 6–4	(Chinese Taipei) Chan Yung-jan	(Germany) Anna-Lena Friedsam (Romania) Ana Bogdan	(Poland) Magda Linette (Russia) Alla Kudryavtseva (China) Zheng Saisai (Thailand) Luksika Kumkhum
November 3	OEC Taipei WTA Challenger; Taipei, Taiwan $125,000 – carpet (indoor) – 32S/16Q/16D; Singles – Doubles	(Chinese Taipei) Chan Hao-ching (Chinese Taipei) Chan Yung-jan; 6–4, 6–3	(Chinese Taipei) Chang Kai-chen (Chinese Taipei) Chuang Chia-jung	(Germany) Anna-Lena Friedsam (Romania) Ana Bogdan	(Poland) Magda Linette (Russia) Alla Kudryavtseva (China) Zheng Saisai (Thailand) Luksika Kumkhum
November 3	Open GDF Suez de Limoges; Limoges, France $125,000 – hard (indoor) – 32S/16Q/8D; Singles – Doubles	(Czech Republic) Tereza Smitková; 7–6^{(7–4)}, 7–5	(France) Kristina Mladenovic	(Italy) Francesca Schiavone (France) Océane Dodin	(Ukraine) Lesia Tsurenko (Netherlands) Richèl Hogenkamp (Croatia) Ana Konjuh (Kazakhstan) Yulia Putintseva
November 3	Open GDF Suez de Limoges; Limoges, France $125,000 – hard (indoor) – 32S/16Q/8D; Singles – Doubles	(Czech Republic) Kateřina Siniaková (Czech Republic) Renata Voráčová; 2–6, 6–2, [10–5]	(Hungary) Tímea Babos (France) Kristina Mladenovic	(Italy) Francesca Schiavone (France) Océane Dodin	(Ukraine) Lesia Tsurenko (Netherlands) Richèl Hogenkamp (Croatia) Ana Konjuh (Kazakhstan) Yulia Putintseva

== Statistical information ==
These tables present the number of singles (S) and doubles (D) titles won by each player and each nation during the season. The players/nations are sorted by: 1) total number of titles (a doubles title won by two players representing the same nation counts as only one win for the nation); 2) a singles > doubles hierarchy; 3) alphabetical order (by family names for players).

To avoid confusion and double counting, these tables should be updated only after an event is completed.

=== Titles won by player ===
Total	Player	S	D	S	D
2	Chuang Chia-jung (TPE)		● ●	0	2
1	Vitalia Diatchenko (RUS)	●		1	0
1	Magda Linette (POL)	●		1	0
1	Anna-Lena Friedsam (GER)	●		1	0
1	Peng Shuai (CHN)	●		1	0
1	Tereza Smitková (CZE)	●		1	0
1	Chan Chin-wei (TPE)		●	0	1
1	Chan Hao-ching (TPE)		●	0	1
1	Chan Yung-jan (TPE)		●	0	1
1	Junri Namigata (JPN)		●	0	1
1	Arina Rodionova (AUS)		●	0	1
1	Olga Savchuk (UKR)		●	0	1
1	Kateřina Siniaková (CZE)		●	0	1
1	Renata Voráčová (CZE)		●	0	1

=== Titles won by nation ===
Total	Nation	S	D
3	Chinese Taipei (TPE)	0	3
2	Czech Republic (CZE)	1	1
1	China (CHN)	1	0
1	Germany (GER)	1	0
1	Poland (POL)	1	0
1	Russia (RUS)	1	0
1	Australia (AUS)	0	1
1	Japan (JPN)	0	1
1	Ukraine (UKR)	0	1

== Points distribution ==
Event	W	F	SF	QF	R16	R32	Q	Q2	Q1
Singles	160	95	57	29	15	1	6	4	1
Doubles	160	95	57	29	1	—N/a	—N/a	—N/a	—N/a
