= Latisha Chan career statistics =

Tennis statistics of Latisha Chan

Career finals
Discipline	Type	Won	Lost	Total
Singles	Grand Slam	–	–	–
Singles	WTA Finals (Note: Formerly known as: Virginia Slims Championships (until 1995); WTA Tour Championships (until 2014))	–	–	–
Singles	WTA 1000 (Note: Formerly known as: Category 4 & 5 & 6 (until 1990); Tier I (until 2009); WTA Premier Mandatory and 5 (until 2021))	–	–	–
Singles	WTA 500 (Note: Formerly known as: Category 3 (until 1990); Tier II (until 2009); WTA Premier (until 2021))	–	–	–
Singles	WTA 250 (Note: Formerly known as: Category 1 & 2 (until 1990); Tier III & IV & V (until 2009); WTA International (until 2021))	0	1	1
Singles	Olympics	–	–	–
Singles	Total	0	1	1
Doubles	Grand Slam	1	3	4
Doubles	WTA Finals	–	–	–
Doubles	WTA 1000	9	4	13
Doubles	WTA 500	7	11	18
Doubles	WTA 250	16	8	24
Doubles	Olympics	–	–	–
Doubles	Total	33	26	59
Mixed	Grand Slam	3	1	4
Mixed	Total	3	1	4

This is a list of the main career statistics of tennis player Latisha Chan.

== Performance timelines ==
Key
W	F	SF	QF	#R	RR	Q#	DNQ	A	NH

(W) winner; (F) finalist; (SF) semifinalist; (QF) quarterfinalist; (#R) rounds 4, 3, 2, 1; (RR) round-robin stage; (Q#) qualification round; (DNQ) did not qualify; (A) absent; (NH) not held; (SR) strike rate (events won / competed); (W–L) win–loss record.
To avoid confusion and double counting, these charts are updated at the conclusion of a tournament or when the player's participation has ended.

Only main-draw results in WTA Tour, Grand Slam tournaments, Billie Jean King Cup, United Cup, Hopman Cup and Olympic Games are included in win–loss records.

=== Singles ===
Tournament	2004	2005	2006	2007	2008	2009	2010	2011	2012	2013	2014	2015	SR	W–L	Win%
Australian Open	A	A	Q2	1R	1R	2R	1R	Q3	A	2R	1R	Q1		2–6	
French Open	A	A	Q1	1R	1R	A	1R	3R	2R	A	A	Q2		3–5	
Wimbledon	A	A	1R	1R	1R	1R	2R	Q1	Q1	A	A	A		1–5	
US Open	A	1R	1R	1R	2R	Q3	3R	1R	Q3	Q2	1R	Q2		3–7	
Win–Loss	0–0	0–1	0–2	0–4	1–4	1–2	3–4	2–2	1–1	1–1	0–2	0–0		9–23	
Career statistics
Year-end ranking	489	219	96	67	68	94	109	132	106	248	212	406			

=== Doubles ===
Tournament	2005	2006	2007	2008	2009	2010	2011	2012	2013	2014	2015	2016	2017	2018	2019	2020	2021	2022	2023	SR	W–L	Win%
Grand Slam tournaments
Australian Open	A	A	F	3R	1R	3R	3R	A	1R	1R	F	QF	1R	QF	QF	SF	1R	A	2R	0 / 15	30–15	67%
French Open	A	A	QF	QF	A	3R	3R	3R	A	2R	3R	QF	SF	2R	2R	A	3R	3R	QF	0 / 15	30–14	68%
Wimbledon	A	Q2	3R	1R	1R	1R	2R	1R	A	1R	1R	2R	QF	2R	3R	NH	QF	1R		0 / 14	13–14	48%
US Open	A	A	F	1R	2R	SF	1R	1R	1R	2R	QF	2R	W	2R	2R	A	A	1R		1 / 14	23–13	64%
Win–Loss	0–0	0–0	15–4	5–4	1–3	8–4	5–4	2–3	0–2	2–4	10–4	8–4	13–3	6–4	6–4	4–1	5–3	2–3	4–2	1 / 57	96–56	63%
Year-end championships
WTA Finals	DNQ		SF	did not qualify							SF	QF	SF	DNQ	RR	NH	DNQ			0 / 5	3–8	27%
National representation
Olympics	Not Held			2R	Not Held			A	Not Held			QF	Not Held				1R	NH		0 / 3	3–3	50%
WTA 1000 + former^{†} tournaments
Dubai / Qatar Open (Note: The first Premier 5 event of the year has switched back and forth between the Dubai Tennis Championships and the Qatar Ladies Open since 2009. Dubai was classified as a Premier 5 event from 2009 to 2011 before being succeeded by Doha for the 2012–2014 period. In 2015, Dubai regained its Premier 5 status while Doha was demoted to Premier status. The Premier 5 tournaments were reclassified as WTA 1000 tournaments in 2021.)	Not Tier I			QF	QF	QF	2R	A	A	A	1R	W	QF	2R	SF	2R	A	A	F	1 / 11	23–10	70%
Indian Wells Open	A	A	F	QF	1R	SF	2R	A	A	A	A	2R	W	2R	SF	NH	A	A	1R	1 / 10	20–9	69%
Miami Open	A	A	SF	2R	A	SF	1R	1R	A	1R	A	1R	SF	QF	SF	NH	A	A	QF	0 / 11	17–11	61%
Berlin / Madrid Open (Note: In 2009, the German Open was replaced by the Madrid Open. The Premier Mandatory tournaments were reclassified as WTA 1000 tournaments in 2021.)	A	A	A	2R	A	2R	A	A	A	A	A	QF	W	QF	1R	NH	1R	A	1R	1 / 8	8–7	53%
Italian Open	A	A	A	W	A	A	A	A	A	1R	1R	2R	W	QF	SF	A	QF	A	1R	2 / 9	16–7	70%
Canadian Open	A	A	A	A	A	QF	1R	QF	A	SF	QF	2R	QF	F	2R	NH	A	A		0 / 9	14–9	61%
Cincinnati Open	Not Tier I				A	QF	1R	1R	A	1R	W	SF	W	A	1R	A	1R	1R		2 / 9	13–8	62%
Pan Pacific / Wuhan Open (Note: In 2014, the Pan Pacific Open was downgraded to a Premier event and replaced by the Wuhan Open. The Premier 5 tournaments were reclassified as WTA 1000 tournaments in 2021.)	A	A	A	A	1R	SF	QF	A	A	A	SF	SF	W	A	QF	NH				1 / 7	13–6	68%
China Open	Not Tier I				A	2R	2R	A	QF	A	F	SF	W	A	2R	NH				1 / 7	13–6	68%
Guadalajara Open	Not Held																	A		0 / 0	0–0	—
Charleston Open^{†}	A	A	1R	QF	Not Tier I															0 / 2	1–2	33%
Southern California Open^{†}	A	A	SF	NH		Not Tier I				NH	NTI	Not Held								0 / 1	2–1	67%
Kremlin Cup^{†}	A	A	A	A	Not Tier I											NH	NTI	NH		0 / 0	0–0	—
Zurich Open^{†}	A	A	QF	Not Held																0 / 1	1–1	50%
Career statistics
Tournaments	1	1	17	22	13	17	15	11	6	18	19	20	24	17	21	5	13	12	9	Career total: 261		
Titles	1	0	3	3	1	1	0	0	1	1	3	3	11	1	4	0	0	0	0	Career total: 33		
Finals	1	1	9	5	2	3	0	1	1	3	7	3	12	3	5	0	1	0	1	Career total: 58		
Overall Win–Loss	4–0	2–1	45–14	35–19	12–12	34–16	14–15	10–11	8–5	25–17	39–16	33–18	64–13	24–16	40–19	5–4	16–12	8–11	17–12	368–189		
Year-end ranking	148	119	8	17	52	18	42	72	98	36	7	12	1	21	15	15	32	112	30			

=== Mixed doubles ===
Tournament	2007	2008	2009	2010	2011	2012	2013	2014	2015	2016	2017	2018	2019	2020	2021	2022	2023	W–L
Australian Open	A	QF	A	A	F	A	A	A	1R	QF	2R	2R	1R	QF	1R	A	1R	12–10
French Open	1R	1R	A	A	2R	A	A	A	QF	QF	1R	W	W	NH	1R	A	1R	15–8
Wimbledon	3R	3R	A	QF	SF	A	A	1R	2R	3R	WD	QF	W	NH	3R	2R (Note: Withdrawals during tournaments are not considered as a loss.)	QF	19–10
US Open	2R	1R	A	QF	2R	A	2R	SF	SF	SF	2R	2R	SF	NH	A	A	1R	19–12
Win–Loss	2–3	3–4	0–0	4–2	9–4	0–0	1–1	3–2	5–4	8–4	2–3	9–3	13–2	2–1	1–3	1–0	2–4	65–40

== Grand Slam tournament finals ==
=== Doubles: 4 (1 title, 3 runner-ups) ===
Result	Year	Tournament	Surface	Partner	Opponents	Score
Loss	2007	Australian Open	Hard	(Chinese Taipei) Chuang Chia-jung	(Zimbabwe) Cara Black (South Africa) Liezel Huber	4–6, 7–6^{(7–4)}, 1–6
Loss	2007	US Open	Hard	(Chinese Taipei) Chuang Chia-jung	(France) Nathalie Dechy; (Russia) Dinara Safina	4–6, 2–6
Loss	2015	Australian Open	Hard	(China) Zheng Jie	(United States) Bethanie Mattek-Sands (Czech Republic) Lucie Šafářová	4–6, 6–7^{(5–7)}
Win	2017	US Open	Hard	(Switzerland) Martina Hingis	(Czech Republic) Lucie Hradecká (Czech Republic) Kateřina Siniaková	6–3, 6–2

=== Mixed doubles: 4 (3 titles, 1 runner-up) ===
Result	Year	Tournament	Surface	Partner	Opponents	Score
Loss	2011	Australian Open	Hard	(Australia) Paul Hanley	(Slovenia) Katarina Srebotnik (Canada) Daniel Nestor	3–6, 6–3, [7–10]
Win	2018	French Open	Clay	(Croatia) Ivan Dodig	(Canada) Gabriela Dabrowski (Croatia) Mate Pavić	6–1, 6–7^{(5–7)}, [10–8]
Win	2019	French Open(2)	Clay	(Croatia) Ivan Dodig	(Canada) Gabriela Dabrowski (Croatia) Mate Pavić	6–1, 7–6^{(7–5)}
Win	2019	Wimbledon	Grass	(Croatia) Ivan Dodig	(Latvia) Jeļena Ostapenko; (Sweden) Robert Lindstedt	6–2, 6–3

== Other significant finals ==
=== WTA 1000 tournaments ===
==== Doubles: 13 (9 titles, 4 runner-ups) ====
Result	Year	Tournament	Surface	Partner	Opponents	Score
Loss	2007	Indian Wells Open	Hard	(Chinese Taipei) Chuang Chia-jung	(United States) Lisa Raymond; (Australia) Samantha Stosur	3–6, 5–7
Win	2008	Italian Open	Clay	(Chinese Taipei) Chuang Chia-jung	(Czech Republic) Iveta Benešová; (Slovakia) Janette Husárová	7–6^{(7–5)}, 6–3
Win	2015	Cincinnati Open	Hard	(Chinese Taipei) Chan Hao-ching	(Australia) Casey Dellacqua; (Kazakhstan) Yaroslava Shvedova	7–5, 6–4
Loss	2015	China Open	Hard	(Chinese Taipei) Chan Hao-ching	(Switzerland) Martina Hingis; (India) Sania Mirza	7–6^{(11–9)}, 1–6, [8–10]
Win	2016	Qatar Open	Hard	(Chinese Taipei) Chan Hao-ching	(Italy) Sara Errani; (Spain) Carla Suárez Navarro	6-3, 6-3
Win	2017	Indian Wells Open	Hard	(Switzerland) Martina Hingis	(Czech Republic) Lucie Hradecká; (Czech Republic) Kateřina Siniaková	7–6^{(7–4)}, 6–2
Win	2017	Madrid Open	Clay	(Switzerland) Martina Hingis	(Hungary) Tímea Babos; (Czech Republic) Andrea Hlaváčková	6–4, 6–3
Win	2017	Italian Open	Clay	(Switzerland) Martina Hingis	(Russia) Ekaterina Makarova; (Russia) Elena Vesnina	7–5, 7–6 ^{(7–4)}
Win	2017	Cincinnati Open	Hard	(Switzerland) Martina Hingis	(Chinese Taipei) Hsieh Su-wei; (Romania) Monica Niculescu	4–6, 6–4, [10–7]
Win	2017	Wuhan Open	Hard	(Switzerland) Martina Hingis	(Japan) Shuko Aoyama; (China) Yang Zhaoxuan	7–6^{(7–5)}, 3–6, [10–4]
Win	2017	China Open	Hard	(Switzerland) Martina Hingis	(Hungary) Tímea Babos (Czech Republic) Andrea Hlaváčková	6–1, 6–4
Loss	2018	Canadian Open	Hard	(Russia) Ekaterina Makarova	(Australia) Ashleigh Barty; (Netherlands) Demi Schuurs	6–4, 3–6, [8–10]
Loss	2023	Dubai Open	Hard	(Chinese Taipei) Chan Hao-ching	Veronika Kudermetova; Liudmila Samsonova	4–6, 7–6^{(7–4)}, [1–10]

== WTA Tour finals ==
=== Singles: 1 (runner-up) ===
Legend
Tier III & IV (0–1)

Result	Date	Tournament	Tier	Surface	Opponent	Score
Loss	Oct 2007	Bangkok Open, Thailand	Tier III	Hard	(Italy) Flavia Pennetta	1–6, 3–6

=== Doubles: 59 (33 titles, 26 runner-ups) ===
Legend Grand Slam (1–3) Tier I / Premier M & Premier 5 / WTA 1000 (9–4) Tier II / Premier / WTA 500 (7–11) Tier III & IV / International (16–8)	Finals by surface Hard (24–20) Grass (6–2) Clay (3–4)

Result	W–L	Date	Tournament	Tier	Surface	Partner	Opponents	Score
Win	1–0	Oct 2005	Korea Open, Korea	Tier IV	Hard	(Chinese Taipei) Chuang Chia-jung	(United States) Jill Craybas; (United States) Natalie Grandin	6–2, 6–4
Loss	1–1	Oct 2006	Japan Open, Japan	Tier III	Hard	(Chinese Taipei) Chuang Chia-jung	(United States) Vania King; (Croatia) Jelena Kostanić Tosic	6–7^{(2)}, 7–5, 2–6
Loss	1–2	Jan 2007	Australian Open, Australia	Grand Slam	Hard	(Chinese Taipei) Chuang Chia-jung	(Zimbabwe) Cara Black; (South Africa) Liezel Huber	4–6, 7–6^{(4)}, 1–6
Loss	1–3	Feb 2007	Pattaya Open, Thailand	Tier IV	Hard	(Chinese Taipei) Chuang Chia-jung	(Australia) Nicole Pratt; (Italy) Mara Santangelo	4–6, 6–7^{(4)}
Win	2–3	Feb 2007	Bangalore Open, India	Tier III	Hard	(Chinese Taipei) Chuang Chia-jung	(Chinese Taipei) Hsieh Su-wei; (Russia) Alla Kudryavtseva	6–7^{(4)}, 6–2, [11–9]
Loss	2–4	Mar 2007	Indian Wells Open, US	Tier I	Hard	(Chinese Taipei) Chuang Chia-jung	(United States) Lisa Raymond; (Australia) Samantha Stosur	3–6, 5–7
Loss	2–5	May 2007	İstanbul Cup, Turkey	Tier III	Clay	(India) Sania Mirza	(Poland) Agnieszka Radwańska; (Poland) Urszula Radwańska	1–6, 3–6
Win		Jun 2007	Birmingham Classic, UK	Tier III	Grass	(Chinese Taipei) Chuang Chia-jung	(China) Sun Tiantian; (United States) Meilen Tu	7–6^{(3)}, 6–3
Win		Jun 2007	Rosmalen Open, Netherlands	Tier III	Grass	(Chinese Taipei) Chuang Chia-jung	(Spain) Anabel Medina Garrigues; (Spain) Virginia Ruano Pascual	7–5, 6–2
Loss		Sep 2007	US Open, United States	Grand Slam	Hard	(Chinese Taipei) Chuang Chia-jung	(France) Nathalie Dechy; (Russia) Dinara Safina	4–6, 2–6
Loss		Oct 2007	Stuttgart Grand Prix, Germany	Tier II	Hard	(Russia) Dinara Safina	(Czech Republic) Květa Peschke; (Australia) Rennae Stubbs	7–6^{(5)}, 6–7^{(4)}, [2–10]
Win		Feb 2008	Pattaya Open, Thailand	Tier IV	Hard	(Chinese Taipei) Chuang Chia-jung	(Chinese Taipei) Hsieh Su-wei (United States) Vania King	6–4, 6–3
Loss		Mar 2008	Bangalore Open, India	Tier II	Hard	(Chinese Taipei) Chuang Chia-jung	(China) Peng Shuai (China) Sun Tiantian	4–6, 7–5, [8–10]
Win		May 2008	Italian Open, Italy	Tier I	Clay	(Chinese Taipei) Chuang Chia-jung	(Czech Republic) Iveta Benešová; (Slovakia) Janette Husárová	7–6^{(5)}, 6–3
Loss		May 2008	Internationaux de Strasbourg, France	Tier III	Clay	(Chinese Taipei) Chuang Chia-jung	(China) Yan Zi; (Ukraine) Tatiana Perebiynis	4–6, 7–6^{(3)}, [6–10]
Win		Jul 2008	Los Angeles Classic, US	Tier II	Hard	(Chinese Taipei) Chuang Chia-jung	(Czech Republic) Eva Hrdinová; (Czech Republic) Vladimíra Uhlířová	2–6, 7–5, [10–4]
Loss		Aug 2009	Silicon Valley Classic, US	Premier	Hard	(Romania) Monica Niculescu	(United States) Serena Williams; (United States) Venus Williams	4–6, 1–6
Win		Sep 2009	Korea Open, Korea (2)	International	Hard	(United States) Abigail Spears	(United States) Carly Gullickson; (Australia) Nicole Kriz	6–3, 6–4
Loss		Jan 2010	Hobart International, Australia	International	Hard	(Romania) Monica Niculescu	(Chinese Taipei) Chuang Chia-jung (Czech Republic) Květa Peschke	6–3, 3–6, [7–10]
Win		Feb 2010	Malaysian Open, Malaysia	International	Hard	(China) Zheng Jie	(Australia) Anastasia Rodionova; (Russia) Arina Rodionova	6–7^{(4)}, 6–2, [10–7]
Loss		Aug 2010	Silicon Valley Classic, US	Premier	Hard	(China) Zheng Jie	(United States) Lindsay Davenport (United States) Liezel Huber	5–7, 7–6^{(6)}, [8–10]
Loss		Feb 2012	Pattaya Open, Thailand	International	Hard	(Chinese Taipei) Chan Hao-ching	(India) Sania Mirza; (Australia) Anastasia Rodionova	6–3, 1–6, [8–10]
Win		Jan 2013	Shenzhen Open, China	International	Hard	(Chinese Taipei) Chan Hao-ching	(Ukraine) Irina Buryachok; (Russia) Valeria Solovieva	6–0, 7–5
Loss		Apr 2014	Charleston Open, US	Premier	Clay	(Chinese Taipei) Chan Hao-ching	(Spain) Anabel Medina Garrigues (Kazakhstan) Yaroslava Shvedova	6–7^{(4)}, 2–6
Loss		Apr 2014	Malaysian Open, Malaysia	International	Hard	(China) Zheng Saisai	(Hungary) Tímea Babos (Chinese Taipei) Chan Hao-ching	3–6, 4–6
Win		Jun 2014	Eastbourne International, UK	Premier	Grass	(Chinese Taipei) Chan Hao-ching	(Switzerland) Martina Hingis; (Italy) Flavia Pennetta	6–3, 5–7, [10-7]
Loss		Jan 2015	Australian Open, Australia	Grand Slam	Hard	(China) Zheng Jie	(United States) Bethanie Mattek-Sands; (Czech Republic) Lucie Šafářová	4–6, 6–7^{(5)}
Win		Feb 2015	Pattaya Open, Thailand (2)	International	Hard	(Chinese Taipei) Chan Hao-ching	(Japan) Shuko Aoyama; (Thailand) Tamarine Tanasugarn	2–6, 6–4, [10–3]
Loss		Jun 2015	Eastbourne International, UK	Premier	Grass	(China) Zheng Jie	(France) Caroline Garcia; (Slovenia) Katarina Srebotnik	6–7^{(5)}, 2–6
Win		Aug 2015	Cincinnati Open, US	Premier 5	Hard	(Chinese Taipei) Chan Hao-ching	(Australia) Casey Dellacqua; (Kazakhstan) Yaroslava Shvedova	7–5, 6–4
Win		Sep 2015	Japan Women's Open, Japan	International	Hard	(Chinese Taipei) Chan Hao-ching	(Japan) Kurumi Nara; (Japan) Misaki Doi	6–1, 6–2
Loss		Sep 2015	Pan Pacific Open, Japan	Premier	Hard	(Chinese Taipei) Chan Hao-ching	(Spain) Garbiñe Muguruza; (Spain) Carla Suárez Navarro	5–7, 1–6
Loss		Oct 2015	China Open, China	Premier M	Hard	(Chinese Taipei) Chan Hao-ching	(Switzerland) Martina Hingis (India) Sania Mirza	7–6^{(9)}, 1–6, [8–10]
Win		Feb 2016	Taiwan Open, Taiwan	International	Hard	(Chinese Taipei) Chan Hao-ching	(Japan) Eri Hozumi; (Japan) Miyu Kato	6–4, 6–3
Win		Feb 2016	Qatar Ladies Open, Qatar	Premier 5	Hard	(Chinese Taipei) Chan Hao-ching	(Italy) Sara Errani (Spain) Carla Suárez Navarro	6-3, 6-3
Loss		Jun 2016	Eastbourne International, UK	Premier	Grass	(Chinese Taipei) Chan Hao-ching	(Croatia) Darija Jurak; (Australia) Anastasia Rodionova	7–5, 6–7^{(4)}, [6–10]
Win		Oct 2016	Hong Kong Open, China	International	Hard	(Chinese Taipei) Chan Hao-ching	(United Kingdom) Naomi Broady; (United Kingdom) Heather Watson	6–3, 6–1
Win		Feb 2017	Taiwan Open, Taiwan (2)	International	Hard	(Chinese Taipei) Chan Hao-ching	(Czech Republic) Lucie Hradecká; (Czech Republic) Kateřina Siniaková	6–4, 6–2
Win		Mar 2017	Indian Wells Open, US	Premier M	Hard	(Switzerland) Martina Hingis	(Czech Republic) Lucie Hradecká (Czech Republic) Kateřina Siniaková	7–6 ^{(4)}, 6–2
Win		May 2017	Madrid Open, Spain	Premier M	Clay	(Switzerland) Martina Hingis	(Hungary) Tímea Babos; (Czech Republic) Andrea Hlaváčková	6–4, 6–3
Win		May 2017	Italian Open, Italy (2)	Premier 5	Clay	(Switzerland) Martina Hingis	(Russia) Ekaterina Makarova; (Russia) Elena Vesnina	7–5, 7–6 ^{(4)}
Loss		May 2017	Internationaux de Strasbourg, France	International	Clay	(Chinese Taipei) Chan Hao-ching	(Australia) Ashleigh Barty (Australia) Casey Dellacqua	4–6, 2–6
Win		Jun 2017	Mallorca Open, Spain	International	Grass	(Switzerland) Martina Hingis	(Serbia) Jelena Janković; (Latvia) Anastasija Sevastova	w/o
Win		Jul 2017	Eastbourne International, UK (2)	Premier	Grass	(Switzerland) Martina Hingis	(Australia) Ashleigh Barty (Australia) Casey Dellacqua	6–3, 7–5
Win		Aug 2017	Cincinnati Open, US (2)	Premier 5	Hard	(Switzerland) Martina Hingis	(Chinese Taipei) Hsieh Su-wei (Romania) Monica Niculescu	4–6, 6–4, [10–7]
Win		Sep 2017	US Open, United States	Grand Slam	Hard	(Switzerland) Martina Hingis	(Czech Republic) Lucie Hradecká (Czech Republic) Kateřina Siniaková	6–3, 6–2
Win		Sep 2017	Wuhan Open, China	Premier 5	Hard	(Switzerland) Martina Hingis	(Japan) Shuko Aoyama; (China) Yang Zhaoxuan	7–6^{(5)}, 3–6, [10–4]
Win		Oct 2017	China Open, China	Premier M	Hard	(Switzerland) Martina Hingis	(Hungary) Tímea Babos (Czech Republic) Andrea Hlaváčková	6–1, 6–4
Win		Oct 2017	Hong Kong Open (2)	International	Hard	(Chinese Taipei) Chan Hao-ching	(China) Lu Jiajing; (China) Wang Qiang	6–1, 6–1
Loss		Jan 2018	Sydney International, Australia	Premier	Hard	(Czech Republic) Andrea Hlaváčková	(Canada) Gabriela Dabrowski (China) Xu Yifan	3–6, 1–6
Win		5 July 2018	Silicon Valley Classic, US	Premier	Hard	(Czech Republic) Květa Peschke	(Ukraine) Lyudmyla Kichenok; (Ukraine) Nadiia Kichenok	6–4, 6–1
Loss		Aug 2018	Canadian Open, Canada	Premier 5	Hard	(Russia) Ekaterina Makarova	(Australia) Ashleigh Barty; (Netherlands) Demi Schuurs	6–4, 3–6, [8–10]
Loss		Jan 2019	Brisbane International, Australia	Premier	Hard	(Chinese Taipei) Chan Hao-ching	(United States) Nicole Melichar (Czech Republic) Květa Peschke	1–6, 1–6
Win		Jan 2019	Hobart International, Australia	International	Hard	(Chinese Taipei) Chan Hao-ching	(Belgium) Kirsten Flipkens; (Sweden) Johanna Larsson	6–3, 3–6, [10–6]
Win		Feb 2019	Qatar Ladies Open	Premier	Hard	(Chinese Taipei) Chan Hao-ching	(Germany) Anna-Lena Grönefeld; (Netherlands) Demi Schuurs	6–1, 3–6, [10–6]
Win		Jun 2019	Eastbourne International, UK (3)	Premier	Grass	(Chinese Taipei) Chan Hao-ching	(Belgium) Kirsten Flipkens (United States) Bethanie Mattek-Sands	2–6, 6–3, [10–6]
Win		Sep 2019	Pan Pacific Open, Japan	Premier	Hard	(Chinese Taipei) Chan Hao-ching	(Chinese Taipei) Hsieh Su-wei (Chinese Taipei) Hsieh Yu-chieh	7–5, 7–5
Loss		Feb 2021	Gippsland Trophy, Australia	WTA 500	Hard	(Chinese Taipei) Chan Hao-ching	(Czech Republic) Barbora Krejčíková (Czech Republic) Kateřina Siniaková	3–6, 6–7^{(4)}
Loss		Feb 2023	Dubai Championships, UAE	WTA 1000	Hard	(Chinese Taipei) Chan Hao-ching	Veronika Kudermetova; Liudmila Samsonova	4–6, 7–6^{(4)}, [1–10]

== WTA 125 finals ==
=== Singles: 1 (runner-up) ===
Result	Date	Tournament	Surface	Partner	Score
Loss	Nov 2014	Taipei Open, Taiwan	Carpet (i)	(Russia) Vitalia Diatchenko	6–1, 2–6, 4–6

=== Doubles: 2 (2 titles) ===
Result	W–L	Date	Tournament	Surface	Partner	Opponents	Score
Win	1–0	Sep 2013	Ningbo International, China	Hard	(China) Zhang Shuai	(Ukraine) Irina Buryachok; (Georgia (country)) Oksana Kalashnikova	6–2, 6–1
Win	2–0	Nov 2014	Taipei Open, Taiwan	Carpet (i)	(Chinese Taipei) Chan Hao-ching	(Chinese Taipei) Chang Kai-chen; (Chinese Taipei) Chuang Chia-jung	6–4, 6–3

== ITF Circuit finals ==
=== Singles: 22 (16–6) ===
Legend
100K tournaments
75K tournaments
50K tournaments
25K tournaments
10K tournaments

Result	No.	Date	Tournament	Tier	Surface	Opponent	Score
Win	1.	Aug 2004	ITF Colombo, Sri Lanka	10K	Clay	(Thailand) Montinee Tangphong	6–1, 6–1
Win	2.	Sep 2004	ITF Jakarta, Indonesia	10K	Hard	(Indonesia) Sandy Gumulya	6–7^{(5)}, 6–2, 6–1
Win	3.	Oct 2004	ITF Taipei, Taiwan	10K	Hard	(Chinese Taipei) Hsu Wen-hsin	7–5, 6–3
Win	4.	Feb 2005	ITF Taipei, Taiwan	25K	Hard	(Japan) Seiko Okamoto	6–3, 6–2
Win	5.	May 2005	Fukuoka International, Japan	50K	Carpet	(Japan) Ayumi Morita	6–3, 6–2
Loss	1.	Feb 2006	ITF Gosford, Australia	25K	Hard	(Australia) Jarmila Wolfe	3–6, 0–3 ret.
Win	6.	Mar 2006	ITF Melbourne, Australia	25K	Clay	(Australia) Sophie Ferguson	6–3, 7–6
Win	7.	May 2006	Fukuoka International, Japan	50K	Carpet	(Japan) Ayumi Morita	6–3, 4–6, 6–1
Win	8.	Jul 2006	Kurume Cup, Japan	25K	Carpet	(Chinese Taipei) Chuang Chia-jung	5–7, 6–4, 6–2
Loss	2.	Sep 2006	ITF Tokyo Open, Japan	50K	Hard	(Japan) Ayumi Morita	6–3, 3–6, 4–6
Win	9.	Nov 2006	ITF Kaohsiung, Taiwan	75K	Hard	(Chinese Taipei) Hsieh Su-wei	5–7, 7–6^{(6)}, 6–0
Win	10.	Apr 2007	Dothan Pro Classic, United States	75K	Clay	(Russia) Alla Kudryavtseva	6–4, 6–2
Win	11.	May 2007	Kangaroo Cup, Japan	50K	Carpet	(Japan) Ayumi Morita	6–3, 6–1
Win	12.	May 2007	Fukuoka International, Japan	50K	Carpet	(Australia) Casey Dellacqua	6–4, 6–4
Win	13.	Nov 2007	ITF Xiamen, China	75K	Hard	(Thailand) Tamarine Tanasugarn	2–6, 6–2, 6–1
Loss	3.	Aug 2009	Blossom Cup, China	25K	Hard	(Australia) Sophie Ferguson	3–6, 1–6
Win	14.	Nov 2009	Taipei Open, Taiwan	100K	Hard	(Japan) Ayumi Morita	6–4, 2–6, 6–2
Win	15.	Apr 2010	ITF Gimhae, South Korea	25K	Hard	(France) Irena Pavlovic	6–2, 6–1
Win	16.	Jul 2010	ITF Fuzhou, China	25K	Hard	(South Korea) Lee Jin-a	6–2, 6–4
Loss	4.	May 2011	Fukuoka International, Japan	50K	Grass	(Thailand) Tamarine Tanasugarn	4–6, 7–5, 5–7
Loss	5.	Aug 2012	Beijing Challenger, China	75K	Hard	(China) Wang Qiang	2–6, 4–6
Loss	6.	Apr 2014	ITF Nanning, China	25K	Hard	(China) Xu Yifan	3–6, 6–7^{(1)}

=== Doubles: 23 (16 titles, 7 runner-ups) ===
Legend
100K tournaments
75K tournaments
50K tournaments
25K tournaments
10K tournaments

Result	No.	Date	Tournament	Tier	Surface	Partner	Opponents	Score
Loss	1.	21 August 2004	ITF Colombo, Sri Lanka	10K	Clay	(Japan) Minori Takemoto	(India) Rushmi Chakravarthi (India) Sai Jayalakshmy Jayaram	2–6, 7–5, 3–6
Win	1.	26 September 2004	ITF Jakarta, Indonesia	10K	Hard	(Thailand) Pichittra Thongdach	(Indonesia) Liza Andriyani (Thailand) Thassha Vitayaviroj	6–3, 6–4
Win	2.	19 October 2004	ITF Haibara, Japan	25K	Carpet	(Chinese Taipei) Chan Chin-wei	(Chinese Taipei) Chuang Chia-jung (Chinese Taipei) Hsieh Su-wei	7–6^{(5)}, 4–6, 7–6^{(3)}
Loss	2.	31 October 2004	ITF Taipei, Taiwan	10K	Hard	(Chinese Taipei) Lin Szu-yu	(Chinese Taipei) Chang Hsin-chieh (Chinese Taipei) Chao Hsiao-han	6–3, 1–6, 3–6
Win	3.	22 November 2004	ITF Mount Gambier, Australia	25K	Hard	(Chinese Taipei) Chan Chin-wei	(Japan) Ryōko Fuda (Chinese Taipei) Hsieh Su-wei	6–3, 5–7, 7–5
Loss	3.	14 May 2005	Fukuoka International, Japan	50K	Carpet	(Chinese Taipei) Chuang Chia-jung	(Japan) Ryōko Fuda (Japan) Seiko Okamoto	2–6, 6–7
Loss	4.	11 September 2005	Beijing Challenger, China	50K	Hard	(Chinese Taipei) Hwang I-hsuan	(Japan) Maki Arai (South Korea) Kim So-jung	4–6, 0–6
Loss	5.	8 November 2005	ITF Jakarta, Indonesia	25K	Hard	(Chinese Taipei) Chuang Chia-jung	(Japan) Ryōko Fuda (Indonesia) Wynne Prakusya	4–6, 4–6
Win	4.	17 February 2006	ITF Sydney, Australia	25K	Hard	(Chinese Taipei) Chuang Chia-jung	(Japan) Ayumi Morita (Japan) Junri Namigata	6–2, 6–1
Win	5.	26 February 2006	ITF Gosford, Australia	25K	Hard	(Chinese Taipei) Chuang Chia-jung	(Australia) Beti Sekulovski (Australia) Cindy Watson	6–2, 6–3
Loss	6.	24 March 2006	ITF Melbourne, Australia	25K	Clay	(Chinese Taipei) Chuang Chia-jung	(Australia) Monique Adamczak (Argentina) Erica Krauth	6–7^{(4)}, 6–1, 1–6
Loss	7.	2 May 2006	Kangaroo Cup, Japan	50K	Carpet	(Chinese Taipei) Chuang Chia-jung	(Chinese Taipei) Chan Chin-wei (Chinese Taipei) Hsieh Su-wei	6–7^{(5)}, 6–3, 5–7
Win	6.	14 May 2006	Fukuoka International, Japan	50K	Carpet	(Chinese Taipei) Chuang Chia-jung	(New Zealand) Leanne Baker (Australia) Christina Horiatopoulos	6–1, 6–2
Win	7.	23 July 2006	Kurume Cup, Japan	25K	Carpet	(Chinese Taipei) Chuang Chia-jung	(Japan) Seiko Okamoto (Japan) Ayami Takase	w/o
Win	8.	14 November 2006	ITF Kaohsiung, Taiwan	75K	Hard	(Chinese Taipei) Chuang Chia-jung	(Chinese Taipei) Chan Chin-wei (Chinese Taipei) Hsieh Su-wei	7–6^{(1)}, 6–1
Win	9.	22 April 2007	Dothan Pro Classic, United States	75K	Clay	(Chinese Taipei) Chuang Chia-jung	(Germany) Angelika Bachmann (Germany) Vanessa Henke	6–2, 6–3
Win	10.	3 November 2007	ITF Taoyuan City, Taiwan	50K	Hard	(Chinese Taipei) Chan Hao-ching	(Chinese Taipei) Hsieh Shu-ying (Chinese Taipei) Hsieh Su-wei	6–1, 2–6, [14–12]
Win	11.	12 July 2009	Open de Biarritz, France	100K	Clay	(Australia) Anastasia Rodionova	(Uzbekistan) Akgul Amanmuradova (Belarus) Darya Kustova	3–6, 6–4, [10–7]
Win	12.	10 October 2009	ITF Tokyo Open, Japan	100K	Hard	(Japan) Ayumi Morita	(Japan) Kimiko Date (Japan) Rika Fujiwara	6–2, 6–4
Win	13.	2 November 2009	Taipei Open, Taiwan	100K	Hard (i)	(Chinese Taipei) Chuang Chia-jung	(Indonesia) Yayuk Basuki (United States) Riza Zalameda	6–3, 3–6, 10–7
Win	14.	1 May 2011	Kangaroo Cup, Japan	50K	Hard	(Chinese Taipei) Chan Hao-ching	(Thailand) Noppawan Lertcheewakarn (Japan) Erika Sema	6–2, 6–3
Win	15.	5 August 2011	Beijing Challenger, China	50K	Hard	(Chinese Taipei) Chan Hao-ching	(Ukraine) Tetiana Luzhanska (China) Zheng Saisai	6–2, 6–3
Win	16.	6 November 2011	Taipei Open, Taiwan	100K	Hard (i)	(China) Zheng Jie	(Czech Republic) Karolína Plíšková (Czech Republic) Kristýna Plíšková	7–6^{(5)}, 5–7, 6–3
