= 2011 Open GDF Suez Région Limousin =

- Date: 17–23 October
- Edition: 6th
- Location: Limoges, France

Champions

Singles
- (Romania) Sorana Cîrstea

Doubles
- (Sweden) Sofia Arvidsson / (United States) Jill Craybas
← 2010 ·	Open GDF Suez Région Limousin	· 2012 →

The 2011 Open GDF Suez Région Limousin was a professional tennis tournament played on hard courts. It was the 6th edition of the tournament which was part of the 2011 ITF Women's Circuit. It took place in Limoges, France between 17 and 23 October 2011.

== WTA entrants ==
=== Seeds ===
Country	Player	Rank^{1}	Seed
SWE	Sofia Arvidsson	67	1
ESP	Laura Pous Tió	76	2
ROU	Sorana Cîrstea	78	3
CZE	Andrea Hlaváčková	93	4
FRA	Iryna Brémond	109	5
NED	Michaëlla Krajicek	112	6
UZB	Akgul Amanmuradova	125	7
RUS	Alexandra Panova	130	8

- ^{1} Rankings are as of October 10, 2011.

=== Other entrants ===
The following players received wildcards into the singles main draw:

- (France) Lou Brouleau
- (France) Céline Cattaneo
- (France) Irena Pavlovic
- (France) Constance Sibille

The following players received entry from the qualifying draw:

- (France) Clothilde de Bernardi
- (Belarus) Svitalana Pirazhenka
- (France) Irina Ramialison
- (Poland) Patrycja Sanduska

== Champions ==
=== Singles ===
(Romania) Sorana Cîrstea def. (Sweden) Sofia Arvidsson, 6–2, 6–2

=== Doubles ===
(Sweden) Sofia Arvidsson / (United States) Jill Craybas def. (France) Caroline Garcia / (France) Aurélie Védy, 6–4, 4–6, [10–7]
