= 2013 Open GDF Suez Région Limousin – Doubles =

Doubles
- 2013 Open GDF Suez Région Limousin

Final
- Champions: (Switzerland) Viktorija Golubic (Poland) Magda Linette
- Runners-up: (Italy) Nicole Clerico (Czech Republic) Nikola Fraňková
- Score: 6–4, 6–4

Events
Singles	Doubles
← 2012 ·	Open GDF Suez Région Limousin	· 2014 →

Magda Linette and Sandra Zaniewska were the defending champions, having won the event in 2012, but Zaniewska decided not to participate in 2013. Linette partnered up with Viktorija Golubic.

Linette and Golubic won the tournament, defeating Nicole Clerico and Nikola Fraňková in the final, 6–4, 6–4.

== Seeds ==
1. (Croatia) Mirjana Lučić-Baroni / (Austria) Tamira Paszek (quarterfinals)
2. (Ukraine) Lyudmyla Kichenok / (Ukraine) Nadiya Kichenok (semifinals; retired)
3. (Serbia) Teodora Mirčić / (Croatia) Ana Vrljić (quarterfinals)
4. (Italy) Nicole Clerico / (Czech Republic) Nikola Fraňková (final)

== Draw ==
=== Key ===
- Q = Qualifier
- WC = Wild card
- LL = Lucky loser
- Alt = Alternate
- SE = Special exempt
- PR = Protected ranking
- ITF = ITF entry
- JE = Junior exempt
- w/o = Walkover
- r = Retired
- d = Defaulted
- SR = Special ranking

First round
(Belarus) L Marozava (Russia) N Orlova	6^{2}	6	[14]
(Chile) C Costa Melgar (Chile) D Seguel	7^{7}	2	[12]
(Brazil) PC Gonçalves (Portugal) MJ Koehler	6	6
(France) E Guisard (France) M Partaud	2	0
(Switzerland) V Golubic (Poland) M Linette	6	6
(Italy) F Palmigiano (Germany) C Shakovets	3	0
(France) P Gauduffe (Netherlands) C Mulder	1	0
(Canada) S Dubois (United States) N Melichar	6	6

Quarterfinals
1	(Croatia) M Lučić-Baroni (Austria) T Paszek	4	6	[8]
(Belarus) L Marozava (Russia) N Orlova	6	4	[10]
4	(Italy) N Clerico (Czech Republic) N Fraňková	3	6	[10]
(Brazil) PC Gonçalves (Portugal) MJ Koehler	6	1	[4]
(Switzerland) V Golubic (Poland) M Linette	6	7^{7}
3	(Serbia) T Mirčić (Croatia) A Vrljić	4	6^{4}
(Canada) S Dubois (United States) N Melichar	7^{7}	5	[6]
2	(Ukraine) L Kichenok (Ukraine) N Kichenok	6^{3}	7	[10]

Semifinals
(Belarus) L Marozava (Russia) N Orlova	0	4
4	(Italy) N Clerico (Czech Republic) N Fraňková	6	6
(Switzerland) V Golubic (Poland) M Linette	6	0
2	(Ukraine) L Kichenok (Ukraine) N Kichenok	2	0^{r}

Final
4	(Italy) N Clerico (Czech Republic) N Fraňková	4	4
(Switzerland) V Golubic (Poland) M Linette	6	6
