= 2011 Open GDF Suez Région Limousin – Doubles =

Doubles
- 2011 Open GDF Suez Région Limousin

Final
- Champions: (Sweden) Sofia Arvidsson (United States) Jill Craybas
- Runners-up: (France) Caroline Garcia (France) Aurélie Védy
- Score: 6–4, 4–6, [10–7]

Events
Singles	Doubles
← 2010 ·	Open GDF Suez Région Limousin	· 2012 →

Lyudmyla Kichenok and Nadiya Kichenok were the defending champions, but withdrew in the first round.

Sofia Arvidsson and Jill Craybas won the title by defeating Caroline Garcia and Aurélie Védy in the final 6–4, 4–6, [10–7].

== Seeds ==
1. (Italy) Maria Elena Camerin / (Netherlands) Michaëlla Krajicek (semifinals, withdrew)
2. (Sweden) Sofia Arvidsson / (United States) Jill Craybas (champions)
3. (Hungary) Katalin Marosi / (Spain) Laura Pous Tió (semifinals)
4. (Ukraine) Lyudmyla Kichenok / (Ukraine) Nadiya Kichenok (first round, withdrew)

== Draw ==
=== Key ===
- Q = Qualifier
- WC = Wild card
- LL = Lucky loser
- Alt = Alternate
- SE = Special exempt
- PR = Protected ranking
- ITF = ITF entry
- JE = Junior exempt
- w/o = Walkover
- r = Retired
- d = Defaulted
- SR = Special ranking

=== Draw ===
First round
(Czech Republic) H Birnerová (Poland) M Linette	3	3
(United States) A Riske (Switzerland) S Vögele	6	6
4	(Ukraine) L Kichenok (Ukraine) N Kichenok
(France) C Garcia (France) A Védy	w/o
(Latvia) D Marcinkēviča (Belarus) S Pirazhenka	1	2
(Israel) J Glushko (Argentina) P Ormaechea	6	6
(Italy) N Burnett (France) C Sibille	2	7^{7}	[6]
(France) A Bergot (France) I Brémond	6	6^{1}	[10]
(Ukraine) K Kozlova (Serbia) A Krunić	4	6	[10]
(Russia) N Gorbachkova (Russia) A Treskunova	6	2	[4]

Quarterfinals
1	(Italy) ME Camerin (Netherlands) M Krajicek	7^{7}	7
(United States) A Riske (Switzerland) S Vögele	6^{3}	5
(France) C Garcia (France) A Védy	6	3	[11]
(Israel) J Glushko (Argentina) P Ormaechea	4	6	[9]
(France) A Bergot (France) I Brémond	2	3
3	(Hungary) K Marosi (Spain) L Pous Tió	6	6
(Ukraine) K Kozlova (Serbia) A Krunić	4	2
2	(Sweden) S Arvidsson (United States) J Craybas	6	6

Semifinals
1	(Italy) ME Camerin (Netherlands) M Krajicek
(France) C Garcia (France) A Védy	w/o
3	(Hungary) K Marosi (Spain) L Pous Tió	6	2	[7]
2	(Sweden) S Arvidsson (United States) J Craybas	3	6	[10]

Finals
(France) C Garcia (France) A Védy	4	6	[7]
2	(Sweden) S Arvidsson (United States) J Craybas	6	4	[10]
