= 2013 Open GDF Suez Région Limousin – Singles =

Singles
- 2013 Open GDF Suez Région Limousin

Final
- Champion: (Czech Republic) Kristýna Plíšková
- Runner-up: (Austria) Tamira Paszek
- Score: 3–6, 6–3, 6–2

Events
Singles	Doubles
← 2012 ·	Open GDF Suez Région Limousin	· 2014 →

Claire Feuerstein was the defending champion but lost in the quarterfinals to Anna-Lena Friedsam.

Kristýna Plíšková won the tournament, defeating Tamira Paszek in the final, 3–6, 6–3, 6–2.

== Seeds ==
1. (Spain) Silvia Soler Espinosa (semifinals)
2. (Croatia) Mirjana Lučić-Baroni (first round)
3. (Ukraine) Nadiya Kichenok (second round)
4. (United Kingdom) Johanna Konta (first round)
5. (France) Claire Feuerstein (quarterfinals)
6. (Portugal) Maria João Koehler (first round)
7. (Czech Republic) Lucie Hradecká (quarterfinals)
8. (Czech Republic) Andrea Hlaváčková (first round)

== Main draw ==
=== Key ===
- Q = Qualifier
- WC = Wild card
- LL = Lucky loser
- Alt = Alternate
- SE = Special exempt
- PR = Protected ranking
- ITF = ITF entry
- JE = Junior exempt
- w/o = Walkover
- r = Retired
- d = Defaulted
- SR = Special ranking

=== Finals ===
Semifinals
1	(Spain) Silvia Soler Espinosa	1	0
(Austria) Tamira Paszek	6	6
(Germany) Anna-Lena Friedsam	4	4
(Czech Republic) Kristýna Plíšková	6	6

Final
(Austria) Tamira Paszek	6	3	2
(Czech Republic) Kristýna Plíšková	3	6	6

=== Top half ===
First round
1	(Spain) S Soler Espinosa	6	2	6
(Tunisia) O Jabeur	3	6	1
(Italy) G Gatto-Monticone	6	6
Q	(France) K Laisné	4	0
WC	(France) M Arcangioli	5	3
(Ukraine) L Kichenok	7	6
(Canada) S Dubois	6^{7}	0
7	(Czech Republic) L Hradecká	7^{9}	6
4	(United Kingdom) J Konta	4	4
(Austria) T Paszek	6	6
WC	(France) M Partaud	6^{2}	3
(Romania) A Mitu	7^{7}	6
Q	(France) M Georges	6	6
(France) P Parmentier	2	4
Q	(Germany) N Zander	6	7^{7}
8	(Czech Republic) A Hlaváčková	3	6^{4}

Second round
1	(Spain) S Soler Espinosa	6	6
(Italy) G Gatto-Monticone	4	1
(Ukraine) L Kichenok	2	2
7	(Czech Republic) L Hradecká	6	6
(Austria) T Paszek	1	6	7^{11}
(Romania) A Mitu	6	3	6^{9}
Q	(France) M Georges	0	0^{r}
Q	(Germany) N Zander	6	3

Quarterfinals
1	(Spain) S Soler Espinosa	6	6
7	(Czech Republic) L Hradecká	3	4
(Austria) T Paszek	6	6
Q	(Germany) N Zander	2	2

Semifinals
1	(Spain) S Soler Espinosa	1	0
(Austria) T Paszek	6	6

=== Bottom half ===
First round
5	(France) C Feuerstein	5	6	6
(Poland) M Linette	7	4	1
(Belgium) A-S Mestach	6	6
WC	(France) V Muntean	1	1
(Germany) A-L Friedsam	6	6
(Croatia) A Vrljić	2	3
(Brazil) PC Gonçalves	3	4
3	(Ukraine) N Kichenok	6	6
6	(Portugal) MJ Koehler	6^{3}	6	4
(Switzerland) V Golubic	7^{7}	3	6
(Croatia) A Konjuh	0	2
Q	(Ukraine) A Kalinina	6	6
(United Kingdom) T Moore	3	6	6
(Serbia) J Jakšić	6	3	3
(Czech Republic) Kr Plíšková	7	3	6
2/WC	(Croatia) M Lučić-Baroni	5	6	2

Second round
5	(France) C Feuerstein	6	7
(Belgium) A-S Mestach	4	5
(Germany) A-L Friedsam	6	3	6
3	(Ukraine) N Kichenok	2	6	3
(Switzerland) V Golubic	3	2
Q	(Ukraine) A Kalinina	6	6
(United Kingdom) T Moore	2	2
(Czech Republic) Kr Plíšková	6	6

Quarterfinals
5	(France) C Feuerstein	2	3
(Germany) A-L Friedsam	6	6
Q	(Ukraine) A Kalinina	3	4
(Czech Republic) Kr Plíšková	6	6

Semifinals
(Germany) A-L Friedsam	4	4
(Czech Republic) Kr Plíšková	6	6
