= 2011 Open GDF Suez Région Limousin – Singles =

Singles
- 2011 Open GDF Suez Région Limousin

Final
- Champion: (Romania) Sorana Cîrstea
- Runner-up: (Sweden) Sofia Arvidsson
- Score: 6–2, 6–2

Events
Singles	Doubles
← 2010 ·	Open GDF Suez Région Limousin	· 2012 →

Ivana Lisjak was the defending champion, but chose not to participate.

Sorana Cîrstea won the title defeating Sofia Arvidsson in the final 6–2, 6–2.

== Seeds ==
1. (Sweden) Sofia Arvidsson (final)
2. (Spain) Laura Pous Tió (quarterfinals)
3. (Romania) Sorana Cîrstea (champion)
4. (Czech Republic) Andrea Hlaváčková (first round)
5. (France) Iryna Brémond (quarterfinals)
6. (Netherlands) Michaëlla Krajicek (quarterfinals)
7. (Uzbekistan) Akgul Amanmuradova (semifinals)
8. (Russia) Alexandra Panova (second round)

== Main draw ==
=== Key ===
- Q = Qualifier
- WC = Wild card
- LL = Lucky loser
- Alt = Alternate
- SE = Special exempt
- PR = Protected ranking
- ITF = ITF entry
- JE = Junior exempt
- w/o = Walkover
- r = Retired
- d = Defaulted
- SR = Special ranking

=== Finals ===
Semifinals
1	(Sweden) Sofia Arvidsson	6	6
(United States) Alison Riske	3	4
3	(Romania) Sorana Cîrstea	7	6
7	(Uzbekistan) Akgul Amanmuradova	5	1

Final
1	(Sweden) Sofia Arvidsson	2	2
3	(Romania) Sorana Cîrstea	6	6

=== Top half ===
First round
1	(Sweden) S Arvidsson	6	7^{8}
WC	(France) I Pavlovic	4	6^{6}
WC	(France) C Cattaneo	5	3
Q	(France) C de Bernardi	7	6
(Israel) J Glushko	5	4
(Italy) ME Camerin	7	6
(France) A Bergot	4	3
5	(France) I Brémond	6	6
4	(Czech Republic) A Hlaváčková	4	2
(United States) A Riske	6	6
Q	(Poland) P Sanduska	3	6	6
(Bosnia and Herzegovina) M Jugić-Salkić	6	1	4
Q	(France) I Ramialison	6	6
(France) C Garcia	3	4
(Serbia) A Krunić	2	3
8	(Russia) A Panova	6	6

Second round
1	(Sweden) S Arvidsson	6	6
(France) C de Bernardi	2	2
(Italy) ME Camerin	6^{1}	1
5	(France) I Brémond	7^{7}	6
(United States) A Riske	7^{7}	6
Q	(Poland) P Sanduska	6^{3}	1
Q	(France) I Ramialison	6	6
8	(Russia) A Panova	3	2

Quarterfinals
1	(Sweden) S Arvidsson	6	6
5	(France) I Brémond	3	2
(United States) A Riske	6	6
Q	(France) I Ramialison	4	2

Semifinals
1	(Sweden) S Arvidsson	6	6
(United States) A Riske	3	4

=== Bottom half ===
First round
6	(Netherlands) M Krajicek	6^{5}	6	6
(Croatia) A Mijačika	7^{7}	3	4
(Italy) N Burnett	6	4	6
(Poland) M Linette	3	6	4
(Ukraine) K Kozlova	1	3
(Switzerland) S Vögele	6	6
(Argentina) P Ormaechea	7^{7}	6^{3}	3
3	(Romania) S Cîrstea	6^{3}	7^{7}	6
7	(Uzbekistan) A Amanmuradova	6	6
WC	(France) L Brouleau	4	4
Q	(Belarus) S Pirazhenka	0	4
SR	(Hungary) K Marosi	6	6
(Greece) E Georgatou	0	4
(United States) J Craybas	6	6
WC	(France) C Sibille	3	6	2
2	(Spain) L Pous Tió	6	0	6

Second round
6	(Netherlands) M Krajicek	7^{7}	6
(Italy) N Burnett	6^{3}	2
(Switzerland) S Vögele	5	3
3	(Romania) S Cîrstea	7	6
7	(Uzbekistan) A Amanmuradova	6	6
SR	(Hungary) K Marosi	4	3
(United States) J Craybas	1	0
2	(Spain) L Pous Tió	6	6

Quarterfinals
6	(Netherlands) M Krajicek	3	6^{2}
3	(Romania) S Cîrstea	6	7^{7}
7	(Uzbekistan) A Amanmuradova	6	7^{7}
2	(Spain) L Pous Tió	4	6^{1}

Semifinals
3	(Romania) S Cîrstea	7	6
7	(Uzbekistan) A Amanmuradova	5	1
