= 2013 Open GDF Suez Région Limousin =

- Date: 14–20 October
- Edition: 7th
- Category: ITF Women's Circuit
- Prize money: $50,000
- Surface: Hard (indoor)
- Location: Limoges, France

Champions

Singles
- (Czech Republic) Kristýna Plíšková

Doubles
- (Switzerland) Viktorija Golubic / (Poland) Magda Linette
← 2012 ·	Open GDF Suez Région Limousin	· 2014 →

The 2013 Open GDF Suez Région Limousin was a professional tennis tournament played on indoor hard courts. It was the seventh edition of the tournament which was part of the 2013 ITF Women's Circuit, offering a total of $50,000 in prize money. It took place in Limoges, France, on 14–20 October 2013.

== WTA entrants ==
=== Seeds ===
Country	Player	Rank^{1}	Seed
ESP	Silvia Soler Espinosa	89	1
CRO	Mirjana Lučić-Baroni	110	2
UKR	Nadiya Kichenok	115	3
GBR	Johanna Konta	117	4
FRA	Claire Feuerstein	120	5
POR	Maria João Koehler	121	6
CZE	Lucie Hradecká	130	7
CZE	Andrea Hlaváčková	141	8

- ^{1} Rankings as of 7 October 2013

=== Other entrants ===
The following players received wildcards into the singles main draw:

- (France) Manon Arcangioli
- (Croatia) Mirjana Lučić-Baroni
- (France) Victoria Muntean
- (France) Marine Partaud

The following players received entry from the qualifying draw:

- (France) Myrtille Georges
- (Ukraine) Anhelina Kalinina
- (France) Kinnie Laisné
- (Germany) Nina Zander

== Champions ==
=== Singles ===
- (Czech Republic) Kristýna Plíšková def. (Austria) Tamira Paszek 3–6, 6–3, 6–2

=== Doubles ===
- (Switzerland) Viktorija Golubic / (Poland) Magda Linette def. (Italy) Nicole Clerico / (Czech Republic) Nikola Fraňková 6–4, 6–4
