= 2014 OEC Taipei WTA Challenger – Doubles =

Doubles
- 2014 OEC Taipei WTA Challenger

Final
- Champions: (Chinese Taipei) Chan Hao-ching (Chinese Taipei) Chan Yung-jan
- Runners-up: (Chinese Taipei) Chang Kai-chen (Chinese Taipei) Chuang Chia-jung
- Score: 6–4, 6–3

Events
Singles	Doubles
- OEC Taipei WTA Challenger

The 2014 OEC Taipei WTA Challenger-Doubles was a professional tennis tournament played on indoor carpet courts. It was the seventh edition of OEC's Taipei Open tournaments, and the third under the 125k series classification. It was part of the 2014 WTA 125K series. It took place in Taipei, Taiwan, on 3–9 November 2014. Caroline Garcia and Yaroslava Shvedova were the defending champions, however, Shvedova chose not to participate and Garcia chose to compete in Limoges instead.

Chan Hao-ching and Chan Yung-jan won the title, defeating Chang Kai-chen and Chuang Chia-jung in the all-Taiwanese final, 6–4, 6–3.

== Seeds ==
1. (Chinese Taipei) Chan Hao-ching / (Chinese Taipei) Chan Yung-jan (champions)
2. (Australia) Arina Rodionova / (Ukraine) Olga Savchuk (semifinals)
3. (Chinese Taipei) Chan Chin-wei / (China) Liang Chen (quarterfinals)
4. (Chinese Taipei) Hsieh Shu-ying / (China) Xu Yifan (semifinals)

== Draw ==
Key

- Q = Qualifier
- WC = Wild card
- LL = Lucky loser
- Alt = Alternate
- ITF = ITF entry
- PR = Protected ranking
- SR = Special ranking
- SE = Special exempt
- JE = Junior exempt
- JR = Junior Accelerator Programme entrant
- CO = College Accelerator Programme entrant
- NG = Next Gen Accelerator Program entrant
- w/o = Walkover
- r = Retired
- d = Defaulted

First round
1	(Chinese Taipei) H-c Chan (Chinese Taipei) Y-j Chan	6	3	[10]
(Canada) S Fichman (Thailand) L Kumkhum	1	6	[3]
(Romania) A Bogdan (Hungary) M Czink
(China) Y Wang (China) L Zhu	w/o
4	(Chinese Taipei) S-y Hsieh (China) Y Xu	6	6
(India) A Raina (Czech Republic) K Vaňková	2	2
(China) X Han (China) K Zhang	6	6
(Chinese Taipei) P-c Lee (China) Y Zhang	2	3
(Chinese Taipei) P-y Sieh (Chinese Taipei) C-h Yang	3	2
(Chinese Taipei) K-c Chang (Chinese Taipei) C-j Chuang	6	6
(United States) A Riley (Chinese Taipei) F-h Wu	2	3
3	(Chinese Taipei) C-w Chan (China) C Liang	6	6
(Chinese Taipei) I-h Cho (Chinese Taipei) C-w Hsu	7	3	[4]
(Chinese Taipei) Y-h Lee (Slovenia) T Majerič	5	6	[10]
(Poland) M Linette (Hong Kong) L Zhang	4	1
2	(Australia) Ar Rodionova (Ukraine) O Savchuk	6	6

Quarterfinals
1	(Chinese Taipei) H-c Chan (Chinese Taipei) Y-j Chan	7^{7}	6
(China) Y Wang (China) L Zhu	6^{5}	4
4	(Chinese Taipei) S-y Hsieh (China) Y Xu	6	6
(China) X Han (China) K Zhang	3	2
(Chinese Taipei) K-c Chang (Chinese Taipei) C-j Chuang	6	6
3	(Chinese Taipei) C-w Chan (China) C Liang	4	3
(Chinese Taipei) Y-h Lee (Slovenia) T Majerič	4	7^{7}	[3]
2	(Australia) Ar Rodionova (Ukraine) O Savchuk	6	6^{3}	[10]

Semifinals
1	(Chinese Taipei) H-c Chan (Chinese Taipei) Y-j Chan	6	6
4	(Chinese Taipei) S-y Hsieh (China) Y Xu	2	1
(Chinese Taipei) K-c Chang (Chinese Taipei) C-j Chuang	6	7
2	(Australia) Ar Rodionova (Ukraine) O Savchuk	3	5

Final
1	(Chinese Taipei) H-c Chan (Chinese Taipei) Y-j Chan	6	6
(Chinese Taipei) K-c Chang (Chinese Taipei) C-j Chuang	4	3
