= 2014 Jiangxi International Women's Tennis Open =

- Date: 21–28 July
- Edition: 1st
- Category: WTA 125K series
- Draw: 32S / 16D
- Prize money: $125,000
- Surface: Hard / outdoor
- Location: Nanchang, China

Champions

Singles
- (China) Peng Shuai

Doubles
- (Chinese Taipei) Chuang Chia-jung / (Japan) Junri Namigata
Jiangxi International Women's Tennis Open	· 2015 →

The 2014 Zhonghong Jiangxi International Women's Tennis Open was a professional women's tennis tournament played on outdoor hard courts. It was the inaugural edition of the tournament which was part of the 2014 WTA 125K series and took place in Nanchang, China, from 21 July through 28 July 2014. First-seeded Peng Shuai won the singles title.

== Singles draw entrants ==
=== Seeds ===
Country	Player	Rank^{1}	Seed
CHN	Peng Shuai	50	1
CHN	Zheng Jie	60	2
JPN	Misaki Doi	85	3
THA	Luksika Khumkum	113	4
LUX	Mandy Minella	115	5
CHN	Zheng Saisai	131	6
CHN	Duan Yingying	169	7
UKR	Yuliya Beygelzimer	168	8

- ^{1} Rankings as of 14 July 2014

=== Other entrants ===
The following players received wildcards into the singles main draw:

- (China) Peng Shuai
- (China) Wang Yafan
- (China) Zheng Jie
- (China) Zheng Wushuang

The following players received entry from the qualifying draw:

- (Australia) Monique Adamczak
- (Japan) Junri Namigata
- (China) Tang Haochen
- (China) Zhang Kailin

The following player received entry into the singles main draw as a lucky loser:

- (China) Yang Zi

=== Withdrawals ===
Before the tournament

- (Japan) Ayumi Morita [replaced by Yang Zi]

== Doubles draw entrants ==
=== Seeds ===
Country	Player	Country	Player	Rank	Seed
AUS	Monique Adamczak	CHN	Zheng Saisai	162	1
UKR	Yuliya Beygelzimer	LUX	Mandy Minella	186	2
TPE	Chan Chin-wei	CHN	Xu Yifan	197	3
JPN	Misaki Doi	TPE	Hsieh Shu-ying	258	4

=== Other entrants ===
The following pair received a wildcard into the doubles draw:

- (China) Sun Xuliu / (China) Zheng Wushuang

== Finals ==
=== Singles ===
- (China) Peng Shuai defeated (China) Liu Fangzhou 6–2, 3–6, 6–3

=== Doubles ===
- (Chinese Taipei) Chuang Chia-jung / (Japan) Junri Namigata defeated (Chinese Taipei) Chan Chin-wei / (China) Xu Yifan 7–6^{(7–4)}, 6–3
