= 2014 Open GDF Suez de Limoges =

- Date: 3–9 November
- Edition: 8th
- Category: WTA 125K series
- Prize money: $125,000
- Surface: Hard (indoor)
- Location: Limoges, France

Champions

Singles
- (Czech Republic) Tereza Smitková

Doubles
- (Czech Republic) Kateřina Siniaková / (Czech Republic) Renata Voráčová
← 2013 ·	Open GDF Suez de Limoges	· 2015 →

The 2014 Open GDF Suez de Limoges was a professional tennis tournament played on indoor hard courts. It was the eighth edition of the tournament which was part of the 2014 WTA 125K series, offering a total of $125,000 in prize money. It took place in Limoges, France, on 3–9 November 2014.

== Singles entrants ==
=== Seeds ===
Country	Player	Rank^{1}	Seed
~~FRA~~	~~Alizé Cornet~~	~~20~~	~~1~~
FRA	Caroline Garcia	38	2
ROU	Monica Niculescu	47	3
GER	Annika Beck	54	4
SVK	Anna Karolína Schmiedlová	73	5
BEL	Alison Van Uytvanck	75	6
SUI	Stefanie Vögele	78	7
FRA	Pauline Parmentier	79	8
FRA	Kristina Mladenovic	80	9

- ^{1} Rankings as of 27 October 2014

=== Other entrants ===
The following players received wildcards into the singles main draw:

- (France) Océane Dodin
- (France) Caroline Garcia
- (France) Amandine Hesse
- (France) Virginie Razzano

The following players received entry from the qualifying draw:

- (Italy) Gioia Barbieri
- (Russia) Darya Kasatkina
- (Poland) Katarzyna Piter
- (Poland) Urszula Radwańska

The following player received entry into the singles main draw as a lucky loser:

- (Netherlands) Richèl Hogenkamp

=== Withdrawals ===
Before the tournament

- (France) Alizé Cornet (lumbar spine pain and replaced by Richèl Hogenkamp)
- (Serbia) Aleksandra Krunić (replaced by Kateřina Siniaková)
- (Sweden) Johanna Larsson (replaced by Andreea Mitu)
- (Austria) Tamira Paszek (replaced by Maryna Zanevska)
- (Czech Republic) Kristýna Plíšková (replaced by Kristína Kučová)

== Doubles entrants ==
=== Seeds ===
Country	Player	Country	Player	Rank	Seed
HUN	Tímea Babos	FRA	Kristina Mladenovic	38	1
POL	Klaudia Jans-Ignacik	SLO	Andreja Klepač	109	2
ESP	Lara Arruabarrena	GEO	Oksana Kalashnikova	136	3
CZE	Kateřina Siniaková	CZE	Renata Voráčová	147	4

== Champions ==
=== Singles ===
- (Czech Republic) Tereza Smitková def. (France) Kristina Mladenovic 7–6^{(7–4)}, 7–5

=== Doubles ===
- (Czech Republic) Kateřina Siniaková / (Czech Republic) Renata Voráčová def. (Hungary) Tímea Babos / (France) Kristina Mladenovic 2–6, 6–2, [10–5]
