= 2014 Jiangxi International Women's Tennis Open – Singles =

Singles
- 2014 Jiangxi International Women's Tennis Open

Final
- Champion: (China) Peng Shuai
- Runner-up: (China) Liu Fangzhou
- Score: 6–2, 3–6, 6–3

Events
Singles	Doubles
Jiangxi International Women's Tennis Open	· 2015 →

The tournament in Nanchang was a new addition to the WTA 125K series.

Peng Shuai won the tournament, defeating Liu Fangzhou in the final, 6–2, 3–6, 6–3.

== Seeds ==
1. (China) Peng Shuai (champion)
2. (China) Zheng Jie (first round; retired)
3. (Japan) Misaki Doi (quarterfinals)
4. (Thailand) Luksika Kumkhum (semifinals)
5. (Luxembourg) Mandy Minella (first round)
6. (China) Zheng Saisai (semifinals)
7. (China) Duan Yingying (first round)
8. (Ukraine) Yuliya Beygelzimer (first round)

== Main draw ==
=== Key ===
- Q = Qualifier
- WC = Wild card
- LL = Lucky loser
- Alt = Alternate
- SE = Special exempt
- PR = Protected ranking
- ITF = ITF entry
- JE = Junior exempt
- w/o = Walkover
- r = Retired
- d = Defaulted
- SR = Special ranking

=== Finals ===
Semifinals
1/WC	(China) Peng Shuai	6	6^{6}	6
6	(China) Zheng Saisai	4	7^{8}	3
4	(Thailand) Luksika Kumkhum	4	1
(China) Liu Fangzhou	6	6

Final
1/WC	(China) Peng Shuai	6	3	6
(China) Liu Fangzhou	2	6	3

=== Top half ===
First round
1/WC	(China) S Peng	6	6
(China) X Han	1	3
(Belarus) I Kremen	6	6
(Japan) M Tanaka	1	1
Q	(China) H Tang	2	4
(Thailand) N Lertcheewakarn	6	6
(China) Q Wang	6	7^{7}
7	(China) Y Duan	4	6^{3}
3	(Japan) M Doi	6	7^{7}
(Slovenia) D Jakupović	3	6^{4}
(China) L Zhu	6	6
(South Korea) S Jang	3	4
Q	(China) K Zhang	2	2
(China) Y Xu	6	6
(Slovakia) M Hončová	6	1	3
6	(China) S Zheng	2	6	6

Second round
1/WC	(China) S Peng	6	6
(Belarus) I Kremen	3	4
(Thailand) N Lertcheewakarn	1	6^{2}
(China) Q Wang	6	7^{7}
3	(Japan) M Doi	6	4	6
(China) L Zhu	2	6	3
(China) Y Xu	7^{7}	3	2
6	(China) S Zheng	6^{5}	6	6

Quarterfinals
1/WC	(China) S Peng	6	6
(China) Q Wang	2	2
3	(Japan) M Doi	3	6^{5}
6	(China) S Zheng	6	7^{7}

Semifinals
1/WC	(China) S Peng	6	6^{6}	6
6	(China) S Zheng	4	7^{8}	3

=== Bottom half ===
First round
5	(Luxembourg) M Minella	6^{8}	1
(Croatia) T Mrdeža	7^{10}	6
WC	(China) Y Wang	6	6
LL	(China) Z Yang	3	1
(Russia) M Melnikova	6	4	7
(Italy) G Barbieri	2	6	5
WC	(China) W Zheng	3	3
4	(Thailand) L Kumkhum	6	6
8	(Ukraine) Y Beygelzimer	5	2
(Hong Kong) L Zhang	7	6
(India) A Raina	6	2	6
Q	(Japan) J Namigata	4	6	2
Q	(Australia) M Adamczak	6^{5}	3
(Slovenia) N Kolar	7^{7}	6
(China) F Liu	7^{7}	2
2/WC	(China) J Zheng	6^{5}	0^{r}

Second round
(Croatia) T Mrdeža	4	4
WC	(China) Y Wang	6	6
(Russia) M Melnikova	4	1
4	(Thailand) L Kumkhum	6	6
(Hong Kong) L Zhang	6	6
(India) A Raina	2	1
(Slovenia) N Kolar	2	4
(China) F Liu	6	6

Quarterfinals
WC	(China) Y Wang	4	5
4	(Thailand) L Kumkhum	6	7
(Hong Kong) L Zhang	1	6	2
(China) F Liu	6	4	6

Semifinals
4	(Thailand) L Kumkhum	4	1
(China) F Liu	6	6
