= 2014 Open GDF Suez de Limoges – Singles =

Singles
- 2014 Open GDF Suez de Limoges

Final
- Champion: (Czech Republic) Tereza Smitková
- Runner-up: (France) Kristina Mladenovic
- Score: 7–6^{(7–4)}, 7–5

Events
Singles	Doubles
← 2013 ·	Open GDF Suez de Limoges	· 2015 →

Kristýna Plíšková was the defending champion having won this tournament on the ITF Women's Circuit in 2013. However, she chose not to participate.

Tereza Smitková won the title, defeating Kristina Mladenovic in the final, 7–6^{(7–4)}, 7–5.

== Seeds ==
1. (France) ~~Alizé Cornet~~ (withdrew due to a back injury)
2. (France) Caroline Garcia (second round)
3. (Romania) Monica Niculescu (first round)
4. (Germany) Annika Beck (first round)
5. (Slovakia) Anna Karolína Schmiedlová (second round)
6. (Belgium) Alison Van Uytvanck (second round)
7. (Switzerland) Stefanie Vögele (second round)
8. (France) Pauline Parmentier (first round)
9. (France) Kristina Mladenovic (final)

== Main draw ==
=== Key ===
- Q = Qualifier
- WC = Wild card
- LL = Lucky loser
- Alt = Alternate
- SE = Special exempt
- PR = Protected ranking
- ITF = ITF entry
- JE = Junior exempt
- w/o = Walkover
- r = Retired
- d = Defaulted
- SR = Special ranking

=== Finals ===
Semifinals
(Czech Republic) Tereza Smitková	6	6
(Italy) Francesca Schiavone	3	2
WC	(France) Océane Dodin	5	6	3
9	(France) Kristina Mladenovic	7	2	6

Final
(Czech Republic) Tereza Smitková	7^{7}	7
9	(France) Kristina Mladenovic	6^{4}	5

=== Top half ===
First round
3	(Romania) M Niculescu	6	4	3
WC	(France) V Razzano	4	6	6
Q	(Russia) D Kasatkina	7^{7}	4	0
(Ukraine) L Tsurenko	6^{4}	6	6
Q	(Poland) U Radwańska	2	3
(Czech Republic) T Smitková	6	6
Q	(Italy) G Barbieri	0	1
6	(Belgium) A Van Uytvanck	6	6
5	(Slovakia) AK Schmiedlová	6	0
(Romania) A Mitu	0	0^{r}
(Romania) A Dulgheru	3	6^{4}
(Italy) F Schiavone	6	7^{7}
LL	(Netherlands) R Hogenkamp	6	6
(Spain) L Domínguez Lino	4	4
(Czech Republic) K Siniaková	6	1	6^{8}
7	(Switzerland) S Vögele	4	6	7^{10}

Second round
WC	(France) V Razzano	6^{2}	7^{7}	1
(Ukraine) L Tsurenko	7^{7}	6^{3}	6
(Czech Republic) T Smitková	3	6	6
6	(Belgium) A Van Uytvanck	6	2	2
5	(Slovakia) AK Schmiedlová	6	4	3
(Italy) F Schiavone	4	6	6
LL	(Netherlands) R Hogenkamp	7	6
7	(Switzerland) S Vögele	5	3

Quarterfinals
(Ukraine) L Tsurenko	2	3
(Czech Republic) T Smitková	6	6
(Italy) F Schiavone	6	7^{7}
LL	(Netherlands) R Hogenkamp	4	6^{2}

Semifinals
(Czech Republic) T Smitková	6	6
(Italy) F Schiavone	3	2

=== Bottom half ===
First round
8	(France) P Parmentier	6^{5}	2
WC	(France) O Dodin	7^{7}	6
(Slovakia) K Kučová	2	4
Q	(Poland) K Piter	6	6
(Germany) C Witthöft	6	7
(Spain) L Arruabarrena	3	5
(Croatia) A Konjuh	3	6	6
4	(Germany) A Beck	6	4	1
9	(France) K Mladenovic	7	6
(Belarus) A Sasnovich	5	3
(Montenegro) D Kovinić	0	4
(Ukraine) M Zanevska	6	6
(Kazakhstan) Y Putintseva	6	6
WC	(France) A Hesse	3	4
(Hungary) T Babos	7^{7}	1	3
2/WC	(France) C Garcia	6^{4}	6	6

Second round
WC	(France) O Dodin	6	6
Q	(Poland) K Piter	4	0
(Germany) C Witthöft	3	1
(Croatia) A Konjuh	6	6
9	(France) K Mladenovic	7^{9}	3
(Ukraine) M Zanevska	6^{7}	2^{r}
(Kazakhstan) Y Putintseva	7	6
2/WC	(France) C Garcia	5	4

Quarterfinals
WC	(France) O Dodin	7	6
(Croatia) A Konjuh	5	3
9	(France) K Mladenovic	6	7^{7}
(Kazakhstan) Y Putintseva	2	6^{5}

Semifinals
WC	(France) O Dodin	5	6	3
9	(France) K Mladenovic	7	2	6
