= 2014 Open GDF Suez de Limoges – Doubles =

Doubles
- 2014 Open GDF Suez de Limoges

Final
- Champions: (Czech Republic) Kateřina Siniaková (Czech Republic) Renata Voráčová
- Runners-up: (Hungary) Tímea Babos (France) Kristina Mladenovic
- Score: 2–6, 6–2, [10–5]

Events
| Singles | Doubles |
| ← 2013 · | Open GDF Suez de Limoges | · 2015 → |

Viktorija Golubic and Magda Linette were the defending champions, having won this tournament on the ITF Women's Circuit in 2013, however, neither player chose to participate.

Kateřina Siniaková and Renata Voráčová won the title, defeating Tímea Babos and Kristina Mladenovic in the final, 2–6, 6–2, [10–5].

== Seeds ==
1. (Hungary) Tímea Babos / (France) Kristina Mladenovic (final)
2. (Poland) Klaudia Jans-Ignacik/ (Slovenia) Andreja Klepač (semifinals)
3. (Spain) Lara Arruabarrena / (Georgia (country)) Oksana Kalashnikova (semifinals)
4. (Czech Republic) Kateřina Siniaková / (Czech Republic) Renata Voráčová (champions)

== Draw ==
=== Key ===
- Q = Qualifier
- WC = Wild card
- LL = Lucky loser
- Alt = Alternate
- SE = Special exempt
- PR = Protected ranking
- ITF = ITF entry
- JE = Junior exempt
- w/o = Walkover
- r = Retired
- d = Defaulted
- SR = Special ranking

Quarterfinals
1 | (Hungary) T Babos (France) K Mladenovic | 6 | 6
(Ukraine) L Kichenok (Ukraine) N Kichenok | 3 | 3
3 | (Spain) L Arruabarrena (Georgia (country)) O Kalashnikova | w/o
(Romania) M Niculescu (Belarus) A Sasnovich
(Romania) R Olaru (Russia) V Solovyeva | 4 | 3
4 | (Czech Republic) K Siniaková (Czech Republic) R Voráčová | 6 | 6
(Czech Republic) E Hrdinová (Czech Republic) T Smitková | 5 | 2
2 | (Poland) K Jans-Ignacik (Slovenia) A Klepač | 7 | 6

Semifinals
1 | (Hungary) T Babos (France) K Mladenovic | 6 | 6
3 | (Spain) L Arruabarrena (Georgia (country)) O Kalashnikova | 4 | 2
4 | (Czech Republic) K Siniaková (Czech Republic) R Voráčová | 6^{6} | 6 | [12]
2 | (Poland) K Jans-Ignacik (Slovenia) A Klepač | 7^{8} | 4 | [10]

Final
1 | (Hungary) T Babos (France) K Mladenovic | 6 | 2 | [5]
4 | (Czech Republic) K Siniaková (Czech Republic) R Voráčová | 2 | 6 | [10]
