= 2014 Jiangxi International Women's Tennis Open – Doubles =

Doubles
- 2014 Jiangxi International Women's Tennis Open

Final
- Champions: (Chinese Taipei) Chuang Chia-jung (Japan) Junri Namigata
- Runners-up: (Chinese Taipei) Chan Chin-wei (China) Xu Yifan
- Score: 7–6^{(7–4)}, 6–3

Details
- Draw: 16
- Seeds: 8

Events
Singles	Doubles
- Jiangxi International Women's Tennis Open

The tournament in Nanchang was a new addition to the WTA 125K series.

Chuang Chia-jung and Junri Namigata won the title, defeating Chan Chin-wei and Xu Yifan in the final, 7–6^{(7–4)}, 6–3.

== Seeds ==
1. (Australia) Monique Adamczak / (China) Zheng Saisai (semifinals)
2. (Ukraine) Yuliya Beygelzimer / (Luxembourg) Mandy Minella (semifinals)
3. (Chinese Taipei) Chan Chin-wei / (China) Xu Yifan (final)
4. (Japan) Misaki Doi / (Chinese Taipei) Hsieh Shu-ying (first round)

== Draw ==
Key

- Q = Qualifier
- WC = Wild card
- LL = Lucky loser
- Alt = Alternate
- ITF = ITF entry
- PR = Protected ranking
- SR = Special ranking
- SE = Special exempt
- JE = Junior exempt
- JR = Junior Accelerator Programme entrant
- CO = College Accelerator Programme entrant
- NG = Next Gen Accelerator Program entrant
- w/o = Walkover
- r = Retired
- d = Defaulted

First round
1	(Australia) M Adamczak (China) S Zheng	6	6^{3}	[10]
(Slovenia) D Jakupović (Slovenia) N Kolar	3	7^{7}	[7]
(Thailand) L Kumkhum (Thailand) T Tanasugarn	6	6
(China) X Han (China) K Zhang	1	0
3	(Chinese Taipei) C-w Chan (China) Y Xu	6	6
WC	(China) X Sun (China) W Zheng	3	1
(Japan) M Miyamura (Japan) M Tanaka	5	2
(China) C Liang (China) L Zhu	7	6
(Italy) G Barbieri (Russia) M Melnikova	6	7
(Serbia) T Čurović (India) A Raina	4	5
(Chinese Taipei) C-j Chuang (Japan) J Namigata	6	7
4	(Japan) M Doi (Chinese Taipei) S-y Hsieh	3	5
(China) Z Sun (China) S Xu	7	2	[6]
(Belarus) I Kremen (Thailand) N Lertcheewakarn	5	6	[10]
(South Korea) S-j Jang (China) Y Wang	2	2
2	(Ukraine) Y Beygelzimer (Luxembourg) M Minella	6	6

Quarterfinals
1	(Australia) M Adamczak (China) S Zheng	2	6	[10]
(Thailand) L Kumkhum (Thailand) T Tanasugarn	6	1	[7]
3	(Chinese Taipei) C-w Chan (China) Y Xu	4	6	[10]
(China) C Liang (China) L Zhu	6	1	[0]
(Italy) G Barbieri (Russia) M Melnikova	3	1
(Chinese Taipei) C-j Chuang (Japan) J Namigata	6	6
(Belarus) I Kremen (Thailand) N Lertcheewakarn	7	1	[8]
2	(Ukraine) Y Beygelzimer (Luxembourg) M Minella	5	6	[10]

Semifinals
1	(Australia) M Adamczak (China) S Zheng	3	3
3	(Chinese Taipei) C-w Chan (China) Y Xu	6	6
(Chinese Taipei) C-j Chuang (Japan) J Namigata	7^{8}	6
2	(Ukraine) Y Beygelzimer (Luxembourg) M Minella	6^{6}	4

Final
3	(Chinese Taipei) C-w Chan (China) Y Xu	6^{4}	3
(Chinese Taipei) C-j Chuang (Japan) J Namigata	7^{7}	6
