= 2014 OEC Taipei WTA Challenger – Singles =

Singles
- 2014 OEC Taipei WTA Challenger

Final
- Champion: (Russia) Vitalia Diatchenko
- Runner-up: (Chinese Taipei) Chan Yung-jan
- Score: 1–6, 6–2, 6–4

Events
Singles	Doubles
- OEC Taipei WTA Challenger

Alison Van Uytvanck was the defending champion, but chose to participate at the 2014 Open GDF Suez de Limoges instead.

Vitalia Diatchenko won the title, defeating Chan Yung-jan in the final, 1–6, 6–2, 6–4.

== Seeds ==
1. (Germany) Anna-Lena Friedsam (semifinals)
2. (Thailand) Luksika Kumkhum (quarterfinals)
3. (China) Zheng Saisai (quarterfinals)
4. (Russia) Alla Kudryavtseva (quarterfinals)
5. (Austria) Patricia Mayr-Achleitner (first round)
6. (Russia) Vitalia Diatchenko (champion)
7. (China) Wang Qiang (second round)
8. (Japan) Kimiko Date-Krumm (first round)

== Draw ==
Key

- Q = Qualifier
- WC = Wild card
- LL = Lucky loser
- Alt = Alternate
- ITF = ITF entry
- PR = Protected ranking
- SR = Special ranking
- SE = Special exempt
- JE = Junior exempt
- JR = Junior Accelerator Programme entrant
- CO = College Accelerator Programme entrant
- NG = Next Gen Accelerator Program entrant
- w/o = Walkover
- r = Retired
- d = Defaulted

=== Finals ===
Semifinals
1	(Germany) Anna-Lena Friedsam	3	6	3
WC	(Chinese Taipei) Chan Yung-jan	6	4	6
Q	(Romania) Ana Bogdan	4	6	3
6	(Russia) Vitalia Diatchenko	6	3	6

Final
WC	(Chinese Taipei) Chan Yung-jan	6	2	4
6	(Russia) Vitalia Diatchenko	1	6	6

=== Top half ===
First round
1	(Germany) A-L Friedsam	3	6	6
Q	(Czech Republic) K Vaňková	6	1	2
(Israel) S Pe'er	6	6
(China) Y Xu	2	1
(Poland) M Linette	6	6
(Slovenia) T Majerič	4	0
WC	(Chinese Taipei) S-w Hsieh	2	1
7	(China) Q Wang	6	6
4	(Russia) A Kudryavtseva	3	6	7
WC	(Chinese Taipei) K-c Chang	6	4	5
(Hong Kong) L Zhang	3	6	1
(Japan) M Doi	6	1	6
(Poland) P Kania	1	4
(Russia) E Bychkova	6	6
WC	(Chinese Taipei) Y-j Chan	7	6
5	(Austria) P Mayr-Achleitner	5	4

Second round
1	(Germany) A-L Friedsam	6	3	6
(Israel) S Pe'er	3	6	2
(Poland) M Linette	7^{9}	6
7	(China) Q Wang	6^{7}	2
4	(Russia) A Kudryavtseva	6	6
(Japan) M Doi	4	4
(Russia) E Bychkova	2	6	3
WC	(Chinese Taipei) Y-j Chan	6	3	6

Quarterfinals
1	(Germany) A-L Friedsam	7^{7}	6
(Poland) M Linette	6^{0}	4
4	(Russia) A Kudryavtseva	3	6	1
WC	(Chinese Taipei) Y-j Chan	6	3	6

Semifinals
1	(Germany) A-L Friedsam	3	6	3
WC	(Chinese Taipei) Y-j Chan	6	4	6

=== Bottom half ===
First round
8	(Japan) K Date-Krumm	5	2
Q	(Romania) A Bogdan	7	6
(China) Y Wang	6^{7}	6	7^{11}
(China) L Zhu	7^{9}	4	6^{9}
Q	(Thailand) T Tanasugarn	6	6
(Ukraine) K Kozlova	4	2
(Canada) S Fichman	4	2
3	(China) S Zheng	6	6
6	(Russia) V Diatchenko	6	6
(Hungary) M Czink	3	2
(China) Y Duan	6	6
Q	(Japan) S Aoyama	3	4
(Russia) E Kulichkova	6	6
(China) K Zhang	0	2
WC	(Chinese Taipei) H-c Chan	4	1
2	(Thailand) L Kumkhum	6	6

Second round
Q	(Romania) A Bogdan	6	6
(China) Y Wang	3	3
Q	(Thailand) T Tanasugarn	6	4	4
3	(China) S Zheng	0	6	6
6	(Russia) V Diatchenko	6	6
(China) Y Duan	3	1
(Russia) E Kulichkova	4	4
2	(Thailand) L Kumkhum	6	6

Quarterfinals
Q	(Romania) A Bogdan	6^{3}	6	6
3	(China) S Zheng	7^{7}	1	4
6	(Russia) V Diatchenko	6	6
2	(Thailand) L Kumkhum	2	3

Semifinals
Q	(Romania) A Bogdan	4	6	3
6	(Russia) V Diatchenko	6	3	6
