= 2012 Open GDF Suez Région Limousin – Doubles =

Doubles
- 2012 Open GDF Suez Région Limousin

Final
- Champions: (Poland) Magda Linette (Poland) Sandra Zaniewska
- Runners-up: (France) Irena Pavlovic (Switzerland) Stefanie Vögele
- Score: 6–1, 5–7, [10–5]

Events
| Singles | Doubles |
- Open GDF Suez Région Limousin

Sofia Arvidsson and Jill Craybas were the defending champions, but both players chose not to participate.

Magda Linette and Sandra Zaniewska won the title, defeating Irena Pavlovic and Stefanie Vögele in the final, 6–1, 5–7, [10–5].

== Seeds ==
1. (Portugal) Maria João Koehler / (Russia) Valeria Savinykh (quarterfinals)
2. (Russia) Maria Kondratieva / (France) Sophie Lefèvre (semifinals)
3. (Poland) Magda Linette / (Poland) Sandra Zaniewska (champions)
4. (Poland) Marta Domachowska / (United States) Alison Riske (quarterfinals)

== Draw ==
Key

- Q = Qualifier
- WC = Wild card
- LL = Lucky loser
- Alt = Alternate
- ITF = ITF entry
- PR = Protected ranking
- SR = Special ranking
- SE = Special exempt
- JE = Junior exempt
- JR = Junior Accelerator Programme entrant
- CO = College Accelerator Programme entrant
- NG = Next Gen Accelerator Program entrant
- w/o = Walkover
- r = Retired
- d = Defaulted

First round
(Brazil) PC Gonçalves (Brazil) R Vaisemberg | 3 | 3
(Ukraine) V Kapshay (Belarus) S Pirazhenka | 6 | 6
(France) I Pavlovic (Switzerland) S Vögele | 7 | 6
(Slovakia) Z Luknárová (Slovakia) AK Schmiedlová | 5 | 0
(France) A Bergot (France) A Collombon | 6 | 3 | [10]
(France) I Brémond (Bulgaria) E Kostova | 2 | 6 | [5]
(France) C Feuerstein (France) C Sibille | w/o
(Italy) N Burnett (Italy) K Knapp

Quarterfinals
1 | (Portugal) MJ Koehler (Russia) V Savinykh | 4 | 4
(Ukraine) V Kapshay (Belarus) S Pirazhenka | 6 | 6
4 | (Poland) M Domachowska (United States) A Riske | 4 | 4
(France) I Pavlovic (Switzerland) S Vögele | 6 | 6
(France) A Bergot (France) A Collombon | 2 | 3
3 | (Poland) M Linette (Poland) S Zaniewska | 6 | 6
(France) C Feuerstein (France) C Sibille
2 | (Russia) M Kondratieva (France) S Lefèvre | w/o

Semifinals
(Ukraine) V Kapshay (Belarus) S Pirazhenka | 4 | 6 | [6]
(France) I Pavlovic (Switzerland) S Vögele | 6 | 3 | [10]
3 | (Poland) M Linette (Poland) S Zaniewska | 7^{7} | 6
2 | (Russia) M Kondratieva (France) S Lefèvre | 6^{3} | 3

Finals
(France) I Pavlovic (Switzerland) S Vögele | 1 | 7 | [5]
3 | (Poland) M Linette (Poland) S Zaniewska | 6 | 5 | [10]
