= 2014 OEC Taipei WTA Challenger =

- Date: 3–9 November
- Edition: 7th
- Category: WTA 125K series
- Prize money: $125,000
- Surface: Carpet (indoor)
- Location: Taipei, Taiwan

Champions

Singles
- (Russia) Vitalia Diatchenko

Doubles
- (Chinese Taipei) Chan Hao-ching / (Chinese Taipei) Chan Yung-jan
- Taipei Open

The 2014 OEC Taipei WTA Challenger was a professional tennis tournament played on indoor carpet courts. It was the seventh edition of OEC's Taipei Open tournaments, and the third under the 125k series classification. It was part of the 2014 WTA 125K series. It took place in Taipei, Taiwan, on 3–9 November 2014.

== Singles entrants ==
=== Seeds ===
Country	Player	Rank^{1}	Seed
GER	Anna-Lena Friedsam	81	1
THA	Luksika Kumkhum	85	2
CHN	Zheng Saisai	94	3
RUS	Alla Kudryavtseva	97	4
AUT	Patricia Mayr-Achleitner	105	5
RUS	Vitalia Diatchenko	107	6
CHN	Wang Qiang	111	7
JPN	Kimiko Date-Krumm	116	8

- ^{1} Rankings as of 27 October 2014

=== Other entrants ===
The following players received wildcards into the singles main draw:

- (Chinese Taipei) Chan Hao-ching
- (Chinese Taipei) Chan Yung-jan
- (Chinese Taipei) Chang Kai-chen
- (Chinese Taipei) Hsieh Su-wei

The following players received entry from the qualifying draw:

- (Japan) Shuko Aoyama
- (Romania) Ana Bogdan
- (Thailand) Tamarine Tanasugarn
- (Czech Republic) Kateřina Vaňková

=== Withdrawals ===
Before the tournament

- (Romania) Sorana Cîrstea (replaced by Wang Yafan)
- (Russia) Ksenia Pervak (replaced by Zhang Kailin)

== Doubles entrants ==
=== Seeds ===
Country	Player	Country	Player	Rank	Seed
TPE	Chan Hao-ching	TPE	Chan Yung-jan	63	1
AUS	Arina Rodionova	UKR	Olga Savchuk	135	2
TPE	Chan Chin-wei	CHN	Liang Chen	223	3
TPE	Hsieh Shu-ying	CHN	Xu Yifan	227	4

== Champions ==
=== Singles ===
- (Russia) Vitalia Diatchenko def. (Chinese Taipei) Chan Yung-jan 1–6, 6–2, 6–4

=== Doubles ===
- (Chinese Taipei) Chan Hao-ching / (Chinese Taipei) Chan Yung-jan def. (Chinese Taipei) Chang Kai-chen / (Chinese Taipei) Chuang Chia-jung 6–4, 6–3
