= 2012 Open GDF Suez Région Limousin – Singles =

Singles
- 2012 Open GDF Suez Région Limousin

Final
- Champion: (France) Claire Feuerstein
- Runner-up: (Ukraine) Maryna Zanevska
- Score: 7–5, 6–3

Events
Singles	Doubles
- Open GDF Suez Région Limousin

Sorana Cîrstea was the defending champion, but chose to participate in the BGL Luxembourg Open instead.

Claire Feuerstein won the title, defeating Maryna Zanevska in the final, 7–5, 6–3.

== Seeds ==
1. (Russia) Alexandra Panova (second round)
2. (France) Kristina Mladenovic (second round)
3. (France) Stéphanie Foretz Gacon (second round)
4. (Japan) Kimiko Date-Krumm (quarterfinals)
5. (Greece) Eleni Daniilidou (first round)
6. (Switzerland) Stefanie Vögele (semifinals)
7. (Italy) Karin Knapp (second round)
8. (China) Zhang Shuai (first round, retired)

== Main draw ==
Key

- Q = Qualifier
- WC = Wild card
- LL = Lucky loser
- Alt = Alternate
- ITF = ITF entry
- PR = Protected ranking
- SR = Special ranking
- SE = Special exempt
- JE = Junior exempt
- JR = Junior Accelerator Programme entrant
- CO = College Accelerator Programme entrant
- NG = Next Gen Accelerator Program entrant
- w/o = Walkover
- r = Retired
- d = Defaulted

=== Finals ===
Semifinals
(Ukraine) Maryna Zanevska	6	4	6
(Poland) Marta Domachowska	4	6	2
6	(Switzerland) Stefanie Vögele	6	4	6^{5}
(France) Claire Feuerstein	4	6	7^{7}

Final
(Ukraine) Maryna Zanevska	5	3
(France) Claire Feuerstein	7	6

=== Top half ===
First round
1	(Russia) A Panova	6	6
(Uzbekistan) A Amanmuradova	4	2
(Ukraine) M Zanevska	6	6
(France) I Brémond	2	4
WC	(France) A Bergot	6^{4}	3
(Kazakhstan) Y Putintseva	7^{7}	6
(United States) A Riske	3
8	(China) S Zhang	0	r
3	(France) S Foretz Gacon	3	6	6
WC	(France) J Adam	6	1	2
WC	(France) A Collombon	2	4
Q	(Slovakia) Z Luknárová	6	6
(Bulgaria) E Kostova	5	3
(Poland) M Domachowska	7	6
(Poland) M Linette	6	2	6
5	(Greece) E Daniilidou	4	6	4

Second round
1	(Russia) A Panova	4	1
(Ukraine) M Zanevska	6	6
(Kazakhstan) Y Putintseva	2	3
(United States) A Riske	6	6
3	(France) S Foretz Gacon	2	2
Q	(Slovakia) Z Luknárová	6	6
(Poland) M Domachowska	7^{7}	6
(Poland) M Linette	6^{1}	1

Quarterfinals
(Ukraine) M Zanevska	4	6	6
(United States) A Riske	6	4	4
Q	(Slovakia) Z Luknárová	6^{1}	4
(Poland) M Domachowska	7^{7}	6

Semifinals
(Ukraine) M Zanevska	6	4	6
(Poland) M Domachowska	4	6	2

=== Bottom half ===
First round
6	(Switzerland) S Vögele	6	3
Q	(France) C Sibille	3	1	r
(Switzerland) A Sadiković	6	3	1
(France) I Pavlovic	4	6	6
(Slovakia) AK Schmiedlová	3	6	6
(Italy) N Burnett	6	1	4
Q	(Russia) N Orlova	4	4
4	(Japan) K Date-Krumm	6	6
7	(Italy) K Knapp	6	6
(Russia) V Savinykh	4	2
Q	(Netherlands) A van der Meet	6	6
WC	(France) F Ferro	2	2
(France) C Feuerstein	1	6	6
(Portugal) MJ Koehler	6	4	3
(Poland) S Zaniewska	2	1
2	(France) K Mladenovic	6	6

Second round
6	(Switzerland) S Vögele	6^{7}	6	6
(France) I Pavlovic	7^{9}	3	4
(Slovakia) AK Schmiedlová	6	5	3
4	(Japan) K Date-Krumm	1	7	6
7	(Italy) K Knapp	3	3
Q	(Netherlands) A van der Meet	6	6
(France) C Feuerstein	6	2	7
2	(France) K Mladenovic	4	6	5

Quarterfinals
6	(Switzerland) S Vögele	2	6	6
4	(Japan) K Date-Krumm	6	4	4
Q	(Netherlands) A van der Meet	1	6^{4}
(France) C Feuerstein	6	7^{7}

Semifinals
6	(Switzerland) S Vögele	6	4	6^{5}
(France) C Feuerstein	4	6	7^{7}
