= Sofia Arvidsson =

Swedish tennis player (born 1984)

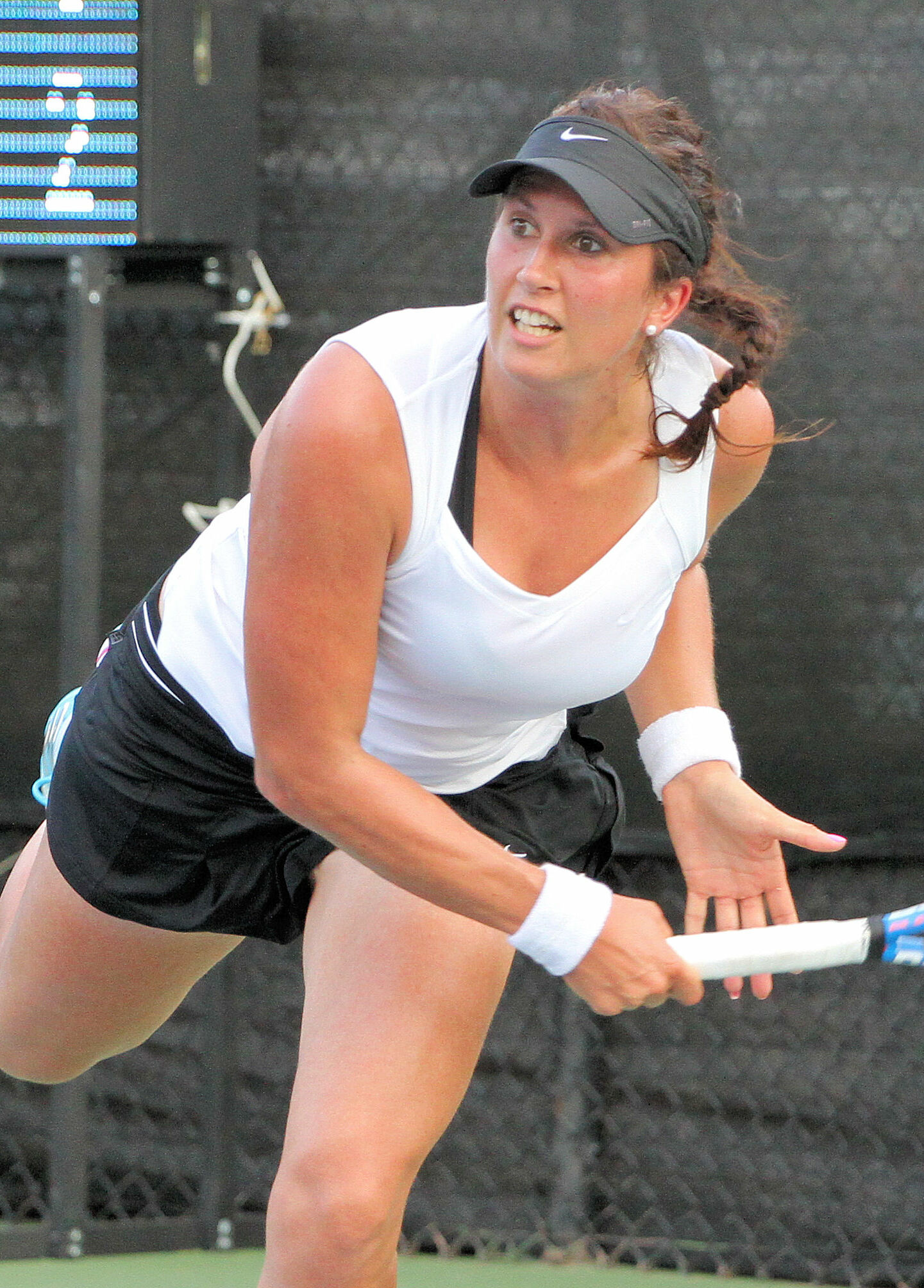
- Arvidsson at the 2011 Texas Tennis Open
- Full name: Lena Sofia Alexandra Arvidsson
- Country (sports): Sweden
- Residence: Halmstad, Sweden
- Born: 16 February 1984 (age 42) Halmstad
- Height: 1.76 m (5 ft 9 in)
- Turned pro: 1999
- Retired: 2016
- Plays: Right-handed (two-handed backhand)
- Prize money: US$ 2,093,393

Singles
- Career record: 458–327
- Career titles: 2
- Highest ranking: No. 29 (1 May 2006)

Grand Slam singles results
- Australian Open: 3R (2006)
- French Open: 2R (2005, 2006, 2012)
- Wimbledon: 2R (2005)
- US Open: 2R (2006, 2008, 2010, 2012, 2013)

Doubles
- Career record: 123–121
- Career titles: 1
- Highest ranking: No. 67 (12 September 2011)

Grand Slam doubles results
- Australian Open: 2R (2007, 2009, 2011)
- French Open: 2R (2006, 2011)
- Wimbledon: 1R (2006, 2007, 2010, 2011, 2012, 2013)
- US Open: 2R (2011)

Grand Slam mixed doubles results
- Australian Open: 1R (2013)
- French Open: 1R (2006)
- Wimbledon: 3R (2013)

Team competitions
- Fed Cup: 50–38

Lena Sofia Alexandra Arvidsson (born 16 February 1984) is a Swedish professional padel player and a former tennis player. In her tennis career, she won two singles titles and one doubles title on the WTA Tour, as well as 20 singles and 13 doubles titles on the ITF Circuit. On 1 May 2006, she reached her career-high singles ranking of world No. 29. On 12 September 2011, she peaked at No. 67 in the WTA doubles rankings. Over her career, Arvidsson defeated top-ten players Marion Bartoli, Anna Chakvetadze, Jelena Janković, Petra Kvitová, Sam Stosur, and Caroline Wozniacki.

== Career ==
Arvidsson began playing tennis at the age of eight. In 1999, she combined the ITF Junior and ITF Women's Circuit into her schedule, and in 1999 made the semifinals of a $10k women's event in Båstad. In 2000, she made the final of Nasbypark and had her first appearances in the Fed Cup.

=== 2001 ===
Arvidsson reached the finals of the junior Australian Open, losing to Jelena Janković. Her breakthrough came in the same year when she took titles in Sunderland and Stockholm (both $10k tournaments). She then won her third ITF title in Buchen, Germany. She stepped up her tournament game as she played qualifying at a $50k event in Dinan, where she qualified and defeated the world No. 146 in the main draw.

=== 2002 ===
In May 2002, Arvidsson reached her first $25k final, as a qualifier, eventually losing to Barbora Strýcová. In the same year, she lifted the Bastas $25k trophy in her home country beating fellow Swede Maria Wolfbrandt in the final. Her ranking was now high enough to compete at Grand Slam level in qualifying. Her debut came at the US Open as a qualifier, where she made the final round of qualifying, losing to Brie Rippner. She made two more ITF finals in 2002, winning in Southampton ($25k) and losing in the final in Prague, which was her final event of the year.

=== 2003 ===
Her ranking now 147, Arvidsson began the year in WTA events mainly in qualifying. She failed to qualify in Hobart and the Australian Open, took a step down and played the $50k event in Ortisei, making the final that she lost to Mara Santangelo.

After the beginning of 2003, Arvidsson lost in the opening qualifying rounds of the French Open and Wimbledon. She won her first Grand Slam match at the US Open, beating Olga Blahotová. Two weeks later, she took the $25k Glasgow crown and lost in the final of another $25k tournament in Jersey. She played the WTA event in Luxembourg, again as a qualifier, making the second round before losing to Maria Sharapova. This was her best tournament as it was the first time she had won a WTA main-draw match. She then played the WTA tournament in Quebec City where she made the second round of the main draw.

=== 2005 ===
Arvidsson made the quarterfinals in Tokyo, Kolkata and Stockholm in 2005 before reaching her first WTA Tour final in Quebec City, losing to Amy Frazier.

=== 2006 ===
Arvidsson began 2006 at the Hopman Cup alongside Thomas Johansson, beating the eventual winners in the group stages (USA). She then posted her best Grand Slam result at the Australian Open, beating Dinara Safina in round two before losing to Anastasia Myskina. She won her first WTA title in Memphis, beating Marta Domachowska in the final.

=== 2007 ===
This slump continued in early 2007, before she won a Swedish tour event (Volkswagen Cup) beating Johanna Larsson. After that, she won the doubles and singles at the $50k event in St Paul. Then she returned as the defending champion to Memphis, beating Ekaterina Bychkova and Nicole Pratt on the way to a quarterfinal appearance against Meilen Tu, but lost. Arvidsson lost in the opening round of the Las Vegas $75k and Indian Wells to Michaëlla Krajicek. She qualified for Miami losing in three sets to Olga Puchkova. On clay in Estoril, she made the quarterfinals, losing to Gréta Arn in straight sets. At the end of the 2007 season, she hit back taking the $25k Nantes title in doubles, the $25k Glasgow doubles title and also the championship in singles at the $50k event in Joué-lès-Tours and the $25k event in Glasgow.

=== 2008 ===
Arvidsson started the season in Auckland at the Auckland Open beating Ahsha Rolle in the first round before a straight-sets loss to top seed Vera Zvonareva. She then moved to Sydney, gaining three straight set wins in qualifying by defeating Galina Voskoboeva, Stéphanie Dubois, Tzipora Obziler and in the main draw beat Elena Dementieva, before finally bowing out against Kaia Kanepi in the second round. In her first Grand Slam tournament of the year, Arvidsson made the second round, beating No. 10 seed Marion Bartoli, before losing to Marta Domachowska. She recorded another win in the Fed Cup, beating Patty Schnyder in three sets. She then reached the quarterfinals of the Tier II Proximus Diamond Games, eliminating Meilen Tu, and second seed and world No. 6, Anna Chakvetadze, in straight sets. She eventually lost to Li Na in a high quality match. She reached her second back-to-back quarterfinal in Memphis, after two three-set wins over Séverine Brémond and Stéphanie Dubois, before falling to Shahar Pe'er in a tight three-setter. In the same tournament, she recorded her best career WTA doubles result reaching the semifinals, partnering Melinda Czink. Arvidsson won her 14th ITF singles title in Zagreb, her biggest career title on the surface of clay. A knee injury at Wimbledon interrupted her season, but she returned for the Olympics (reaching round two, losing to Elena Dementieva) and then recorded a first round exit at Forest Hills. She made the second round of the US Open and came close to beating Jelena Janković in a dramatic three-set match. She ended the year playing Swedish team tennis for Helsingsborg. Her team, which included Johanna Larsson, were the champions, remaining undefeated throughout the campaign.

=== 2009 ===
Arvidsson started the year playing three tournaments in Australia, Brisbane, Sydney and the Australian Open. She lost in the first round in all three of these events. She was included in the Swedish Fed Cup team alongside Johanna Larsson, Sandra Roma and Ellen Allgurin. She posted a 2–2 singles win–loss record and 2–1 in doubles. She then headed to the United States. Illness was a factor in her lack of results, as she lost in the first round in all three tournaments, Memphis, Indian Wells and Miami. She recorded her first official win of 2009 on the ITF Circuit in Torhout, beating Kristina Barrois. Arvidsson recorded her second win of the season in Zagreb, though she lost in the second round. Four back-to-back losses followed, including losses in both the French Open and Wimbledon qualifying. At a $25k event in Kristinehamn, she reached the semifinals as the top seed. Arvidsson and Sandra Roma also made the doubles final. She won her 16th career singles title in Saguenay, Canada, and her 11th doubles title at the same event. Arvidsson then posted a semifinal finish in Barnstaple losing to Johanna Larsson, two finals followed in which she played Jelena Dokić in both, with Arvidsson taking the Joué-lès-Tours title and Dokić beating her to claim the title in Poitiers.

=== 2010 ===
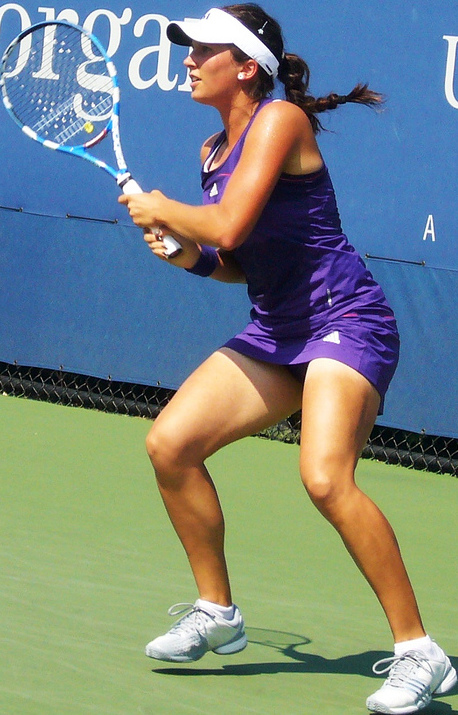
Arvidsson at the 2010 US Open

Arvidsson began in Auckland qualifying, and was beaten in the opening round by Julia Schruff. Next was the Australian Open qualifying, where, after three tough wins (including saving a match point against Marta Domachowska), she beat Jarmila Groth in the main draw before losing to Daniela Hantuchová. Arvidsson was once again selected to play Fed Cup for Sweden. Her singles success was mixed, losing to Wozniacki and Sevastova, but beating Anikó Kapros and Sybille Bammer. She then made the quarterfinals at the $100,000 tournament in Midland, losing to top seed Lucie Hradecká. As a qualifier and the 2006 champion, Arvidsson reached the finals of the Cellular South Cup in Memphis. She defeated No. 2 seed Melanie Oudin in the quarterfinals and Anne Keothavong in the semifinals to reach the final. She lost in an hour to Maria Sharapova in the final. She made two second round finishes at the U.S. clay tournaments of Ponte Vedra Beach and Charleston. She was involved in Sweden's Fed Cup World Group II Play-off against China, where she beat Zhang Shuai but lost to Peng Shuai. Sweden, however, won the tie. Arvidsson made the finals at two ITF tournaments: in Ystad she was the tournament winner, and in a bigger tournament in The Bronx, she was runner-up to Anna Chakvetadze. She had mixed success on the WTA Tour, but reached two further quarterfinals in the year in Strasbourg and in Memphis. In Quebec City, she won her first WTA Tour doubles title with Johanna Larsson.

=== 2011 ===
Arvidsson started her 2011 season at Auckland. She made it to the second round where she lost to eventual champion Gréta Arn. In Hobart at the Hobart International, Arvidsson was defeated in the first round by Australian wildcard Alicia Molik. At the Australian Open, Arvidsson lost her first-round match to ninth seed and eventual finalist Li Na.

=== 2012 ===
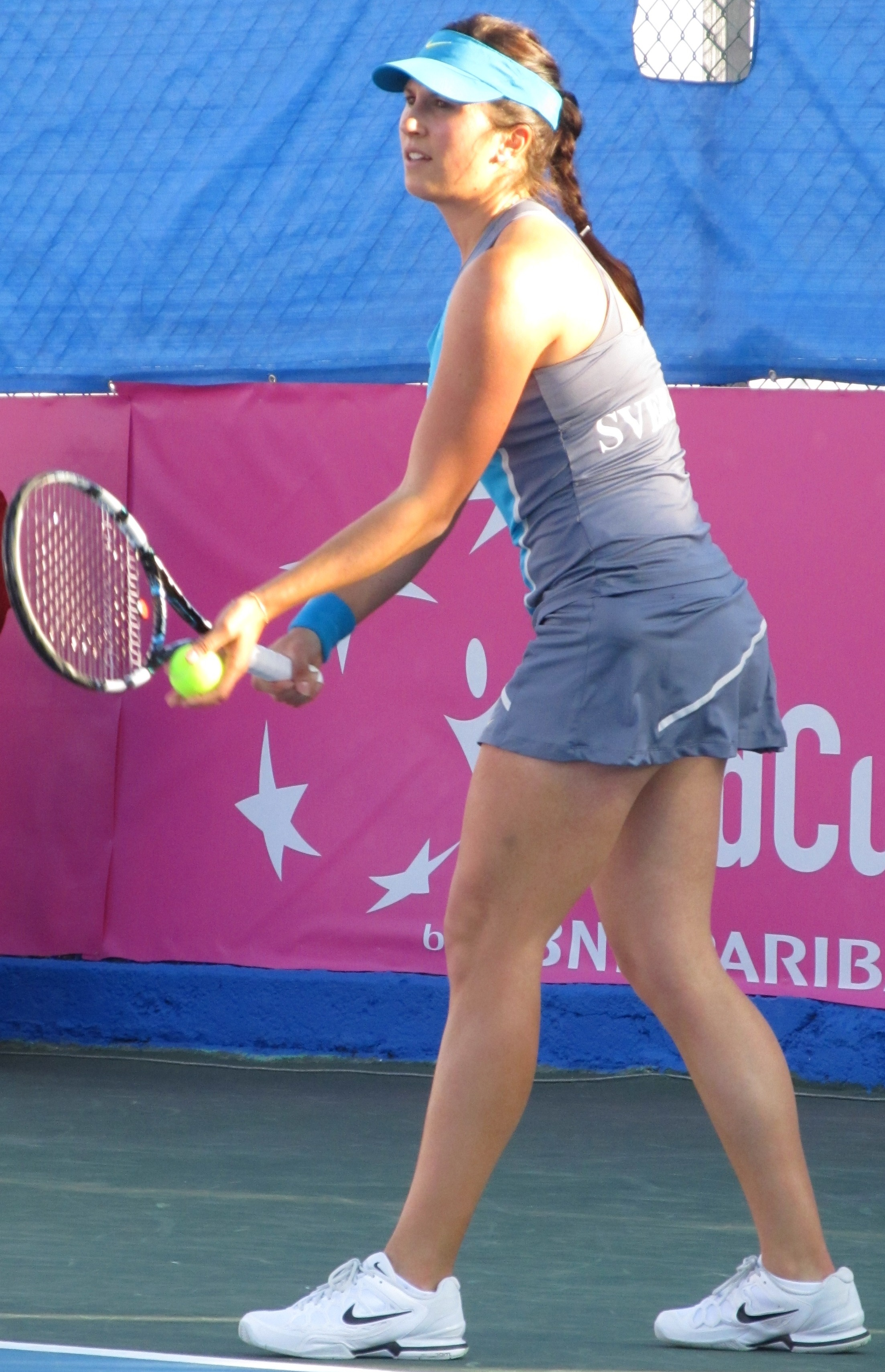
Arvidsson representing Sweden at the 2012 Fed Cup

During her Fed Cup team competition in February in Eilat, she won three straight singles matches and continued to play well in her favorite WTA tournament in Memphis, where she won the title against Marina Erakovic. She participated in the Olympic Games, losing in the first round in both the singles (to Vera Zvonareva) and the mixed doubles (playing with Robert Lindstedt). She reached the quarterfinals of the Swedish Open in Båstad, losing to Mona Barthel.

=== 2013 ===
Arvidsson began the 2013 season at the Brisbane International. She upset seventh seed Sam Stosur in the first round. She lost in the second round to Sloane Stephens. At the Sydney International, Arvidsson was defeated in the final round of qualifying by Galina Voskoboeva. At the Australian Open, Arvidsson lost in the first round to qualifier Luksika Kumkhum.

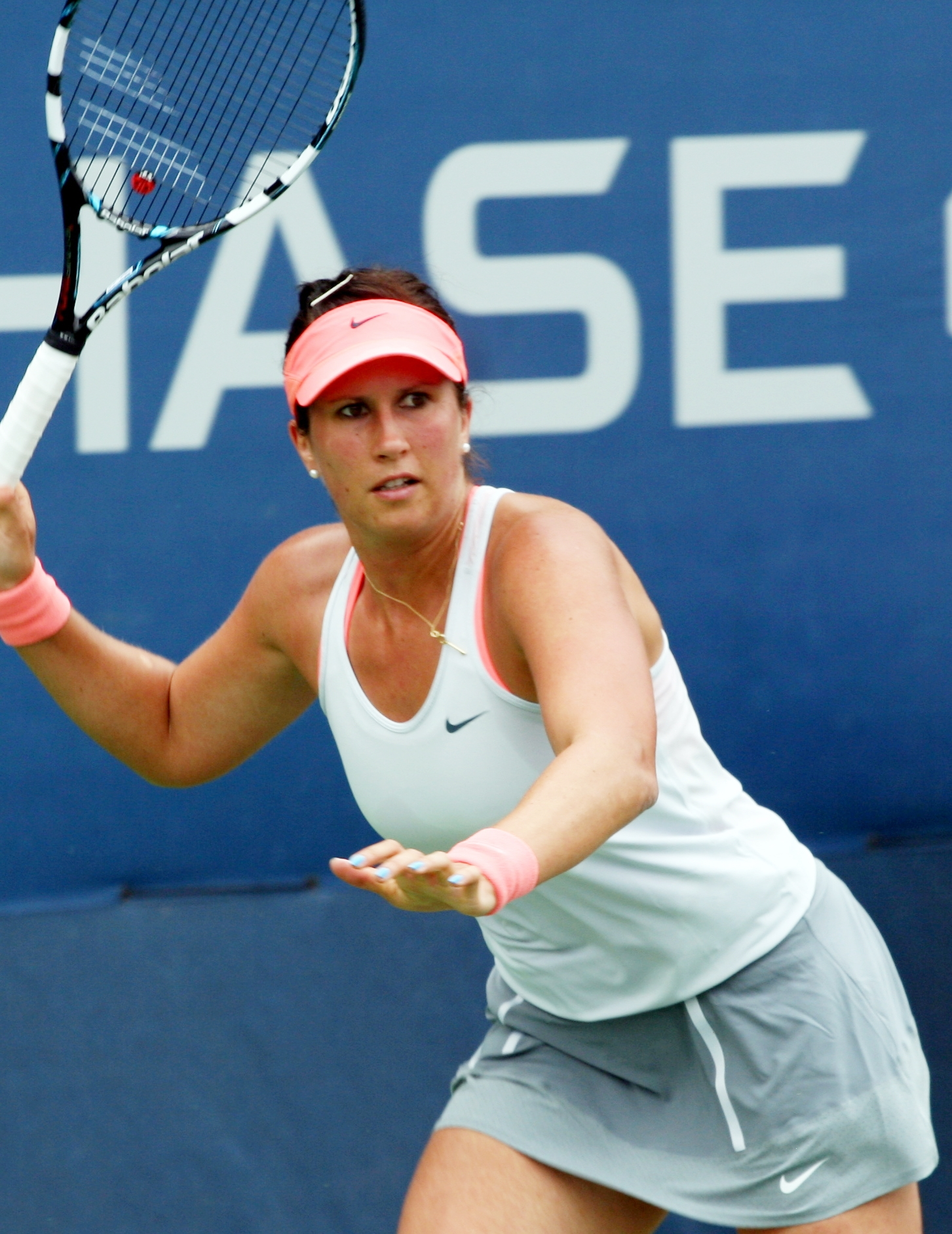
Arvidsson at the 2013 US Open

After the Australian Open, Arvidsson played in Paris at the WTA indoor event where she was defeated in the first round by Alizé Cornet. During the Fed Cup tie versus Argentina, she lost her first rubber to Florencia Molinero; she won her second rubber when her opponent, Paula Ormaechea, retired due to a torn ligament. In the end, Sweden won the tie over Argentina 3–2. As the defending champion and second seed at the U.S. Indoor Championships, Arvidsson reached the second round where she was defeated by Marina Erakovic in a replay of last year's final. In March, Arvidsson competed in Indian Wells at the Indian Wells Open. She lost in the second round to 21st seed Julia Görges. At the Miami Tennis in Miami, Arvidsson was defeated in the first round by Peng Shuai. Playing for Sweden in the Fed Cup tie against the USA. Arvidsson won her first match over Sloane Stephens. She lost her second match to Serena Williams. The USA ended up winning the tie over Sweden 3–2.

Starting her clay-court season at the Portugal Open, Arvidsson was defeated in the first round by qualifier Galina Voskoboeva. In Madrid, Arvidsson lost her first-round match to Sabine Lisicki. At the Brussels Open, she was defeated in the first round by eighth seed Peng Shuai. Playing in Paris at the French Open, Arvidsson lost in the first round to 32nd seed Sabine Lisicki. After her first-round loss at Roland Garros, Arvidsson moved on to Germany to compete at the first edition of the Nürnberger Versicherungscup. She was defeated in the first round by German wildcard and eventual finalist Andrea Petkovic.

Arvidsson played only one tournament to prepare for Wimbledon which was the Rosmalen Open. She reached the second round where she lost to third seed Carla Suárez Navarro. In London at the Wimbledon Championships, Arvidsson was defeated in the first round by Mirjana Lučić-Baroni.

Playing in her home country at the Swedish Open, Arvidsson lost in the first round to eighth seed, compatriot, and eventual finalist Johanna Larsson.

She participated in two tournaments to get ready for the US Open. Getting past qualifying at the Cincinnati Open, she was defeated in the first round by Alisa Kleybanova. At New Haven, Arvidsson retired during her second-round qualifying match against Monica Puig. Arvidsson won her first Grand Slam match of the year by beating Petra Cetkovská in the first round of the US Open. She lost in the second round to fifth seed Li Na.

Two weeks after the US Open, Arvidsson traveled to Quebec to play at the Challenge Bell. She was defeated in the first round by fifth seed Eugenie Bouchard. In October, Arvidsson competed at the Generali Ladies Linz. She lost in the second round of qualifying to Renata Voráčová. Making it past the qualifying rounds at the Kremlin Cup, she reached the second round where she was defeated by eighth seed Svetlana Kuznetsova. Arvidsson reached the final at the ITF Poitiers in France. She ended up losing in three sets to qualifier Aliaksandra Sasnovich. Arvidsson played her final tournament of the year at the Open de Nantes. Seeded eighth, she was defeated in the first round by eventual finalist Magda Linette.

Arvidsson ended the year ranked 118.

=== 2014 ===
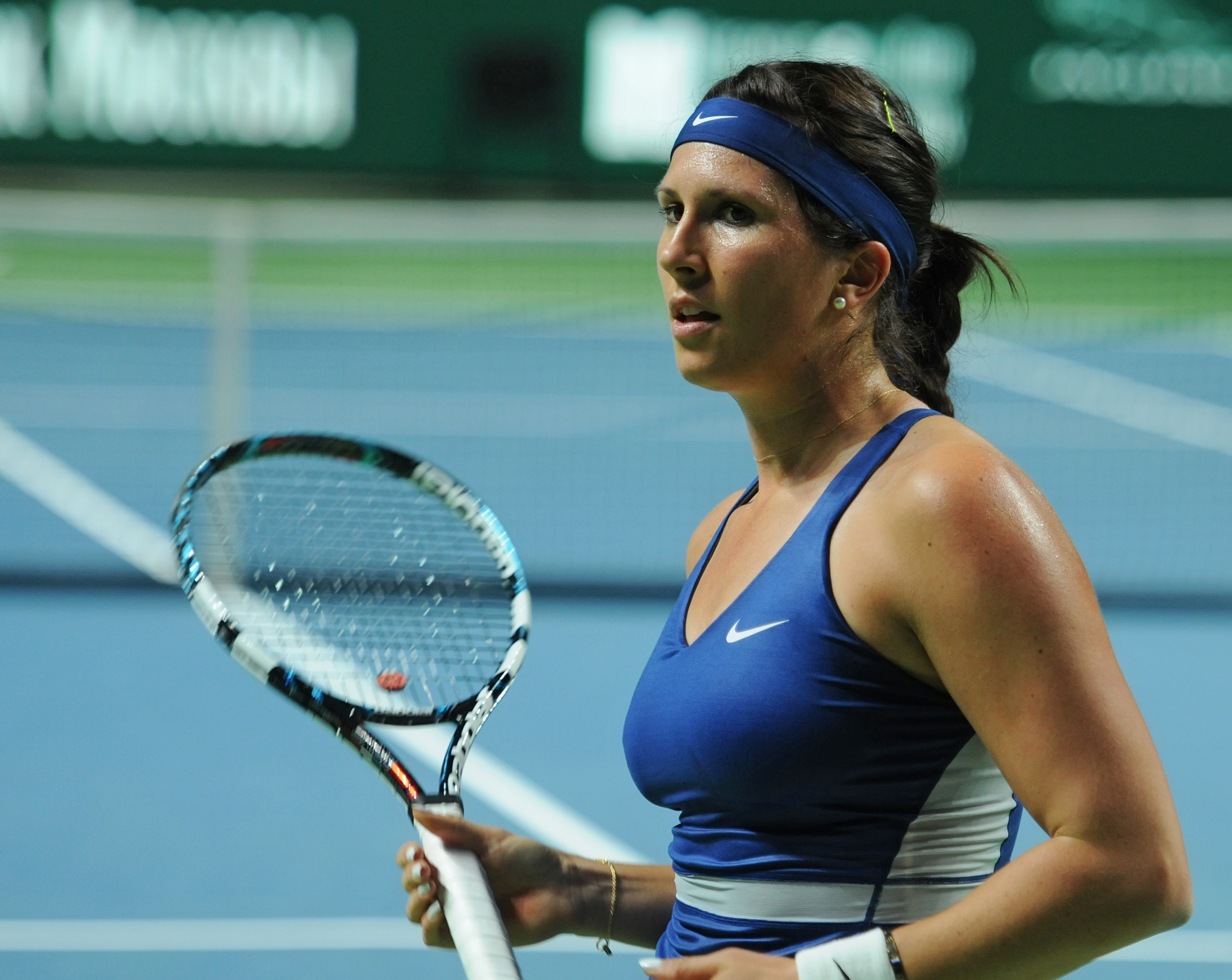
Arvidsson at the 2014 Kremlin Cup

Arvidsson started her 2014 season in Melbourne at the Australian Open. She lost in the first round of qualifying to Renata Voráčová.

=== 2016 ===
On 4 January 2016, Arvidsson announced her retirement from professional tennis.

== Performance timelines ==
Key
W	F	SF	QF	#R	RR	Q#	P#	DNQ	A	Z#	PO	G	S	B	NMS	NTI	P	NH

(W) winner; (F) finalist; (SF) semifinalist; (QF) quarterfinalist; (#R) rounds 4, 3, 2, 1; (RR) round-robin stage; (Q#) qualification round; (P#) preliminary round; (DNQ) did not qualify; (A) absent; (Z#) Davis/Fed Cup Zonal Group (with number indication) or (PO) play-off; (G) gold, (S) silver or (B) bronze Olympic/Paralympic medal; (NMS) not a Masters tournament; (NTI) not a Tier I tournament; (P) postponed; (NH) not held; (SR) strike rate (events won / competed); (W–L) win–loss record.
To avoid confusion and double counting, these charts are updated at the conclusion of a tournament or when the player's participation has ended.

Only main-draw results in WTA Tour, Grand Slam tournaments, Fed Cup and Olympic Games are included in win–loss records.

=== Singles ===
Tournament	2001	2002	2003	2004	2005	2006	2007	2008	2009	2010	2011	2012	2013	2014	2015	SR	W–L	Win%
Grand Slam tournaments
Australian Open	A	A	Q2	1R	Q1	3R	1R	2R	1R	2R	1R	1R	1R	Q1	A	0 / 9	4–9	31%
French Open	A	A	Q1	Q2	2R	2R	1R	1R	Q1	1R	1R	2R	1R	Q1	A	0 / 8	3–8	27%
Wimbledon	A	A	Q2	Q3	2R	1R	Q2	1R	Q1	1R	1R	1R	1R	Q1	A	0 / 7	1–7	13%
US Open	A	Q3	Q2	Q1	Q1	2R	1R	2R	Q3	2R	1R	2R	2R	Q1	A	0 / 7	5–7	42%
Win–loss	0–0	0–0	0–0	0–1	2–2	4–4	0–3	2–4	0–1	2–4	0–4	2–4	1–4	0–0	0–0	0 / 31	13–31	30%
Year-end championships
WTA Elite Trophy	DNQ											RR	DNQ			0 / 1	1–0	100%
National representation
Summer Olympics	NH			A	NH			2R	NH			1R	NH			0 / 2	1–2	33%
Premier M & 5 + former
Indian Wells Open	A	A	A	A	A	A	1R	2R	1R	A	2R	3R	2R	A	A	0 / 6	5–6	45%
Miami Open	A	A	A	Q1	A	4R	1R	2R	1R	2R	1R	2R	1R	A	A	0 / 8	5–8	38%
Berlin / Madrid Open (Note: In 2009, the German Open was replaced by the Madrid Open. The Premier Mandatory tournaments were reclassified as WTA 1000 tournaments in 2021.)	A	A	A	Q1	A	1R	A	A	A	A	2R	1R	1R	A	A	0 / 4	1–4	20%
Italian Open	A	A	A	A	A	1R	A	A	A	A	A	2R	A	A	A	0 / 2	1–2	33%
Canadian Open	A	A	A	A	A	A	A	A	A	A	A	1R	A	A	A	0 / 1	0–1	0%
Cincinnati Open	NMS								A	A	2R	2R	1R	A	A	0 / 3	2–3	40%
Pan Pacific / Wuhan Open (Note: In 2014, the Pan Pacific Open was downgraded to a Premier event and replaced by the Wuhan Open. The Premier 5 tournaments were reclassified as WTA 1000 tournaments in 2021.)	A	A	A	A	A	A	A	A	A	A	1R	A	A	A	A	0 / 1	0–1	0%
China Open	NMS								A	A	3R	1R	A	A	A	0 / 2	2–2	50%
Charleston Open (former)	A	A	A	A	A	1R	A	A	NMS							0 / 1	0–1	0%
Zurich Open (former)	A	A	A	A	A	Q1	A	NH/NMS								0 / 0	0–0	–
Win–loss	0–0	0–0	0–0	0–0	0–0	2–4	0–2	2–2	0–2	1–1	5–6	5–7	1–4	0–0	0–0	0 / 28	16–28	36%
Career statistics
Tournaments played	1	1	3	6	8	20	11	19	8	16	23	23	18	1	1	Career total: 159		
Year-end ranking		167	113	176	67	63	102	64	124	52	78	41	120	271	316	$2,094,753		

=== Doubles ===
Tournament	2003	2004	2005	2006	2007	2008	2009	2010	2011	2012	2013	2014	2015	SR	W–L	Win%
Grand Slam tournaments
Australian Open	A	A	A	1R	2R	A	2R	A	2R	1R	1R	A	A	0 / 6	3–6	33%
French Open	A	A	A	2R	A	1R	A	1R	2R	1R	1R	A	A	0 / 6	2–6	25%
Wimbledon	A	Q1	A	1R	1R	A	A	1R	1R	1R	1R	A	A	0 / 6	0–6	0%
US Open	A	A	A	1R	A	1R	A	1R	2R	1R	1R	A	A	0 / 6	1–6	14%
Win–loss	0–0	0–0	0–0	1–4	1–2	0–2	1–1	0–3	3–4	0–4	0–4	0–0	0–0	0 / 24	6–24	20%
Premier M & Premier 5
Berlin / Madrid Open	A	A	A	A	A	A	A	A	A	A	1R	A	A	0 / 1	0–1	0%
Italian Open	A	A	A	A	A	A	A	A	A	1R	A	A	A	0 / 1	0–1	0%
Cincinnati Open	NMS						A	A	A	2R	A	A	A	0 / 1	0–1	0%
Win–loss	0–0	0–0	0–0	0–0	0–0	0–0	0–0	0–0	0–0	0–2	0–1	0–0	0–0	0 / 3	0–3	0%
Career statistics
Tournaments	1	5	2	7	4	9	3	10	12	11	9	1	1	Career total: 75		

== WTA Tour finals ==
=== Singles: 4 (2 titles, 2 runner-ups) ===
Legend Premier International (2–2)	Finals by surface Hard (2–2) Clay (0–0)

Result	W-L	Date	Tournament	Tier	Surface	Opponent	Score
Loss	0–1	Nov 2005	Tournoi de Québec, Canada	Tier III	Hard (i)	(United States) Amy Frazier	1–6, 5–7
Win	1–1	Feb 2006	U.S. Indoor Championships	Tier III	Hard (i)	(Poland) Marta Domachowska	6–2, 2–6, 6–3
Loss	1–2	Jun 2010	U.S. Indoor Championships	International	Hard (i)	(Russia) Maria Sharapova	2–6, 1–6
Win	2–2	Feb 2012	U.S. Indoor Championships (2)	International	Hard (i)	(New Zealand) Marina Erakovic	6–3, 6–4

=== Doubles: 3 (1 title, 2 runner-ups) ===
Legend Premier International (1–2)	Finals by surface Hard (0–2) Carpet (1–0)

Result	W-L	Date	Tournament	Tier	Surface	Partner	Opponents	Score
Win	1–0	Sep 2010	Tournoi de Québec, Canada	International	Carpet (i)	(Sweden) Johanna Larsson	(United States) Bethanie Mattek-Sands (Czech Republic) Barbora Záhlavová-Strýcová	6–1, 2–6, [10–6]
Loss	1–1	Apr 2012	Danish Open, Denmark	International	Hard (i)	(Estonia) Kaia Kanepi	(Japan) Kimiko Date-Krumm (Japan) Rika Fujiwara	2–6, 6–4, [5–10]
Loss	1–2	Feb 2013	U.S. Indoor Championships	International	Hard (i)	(Sweden) Johanna Larsson	(France) Kristina Mladenovic (Kazakhstan) Galina Voskoboeva	6–7^{(5–7)}, 3–6

== ITF Circuit finals ==
=== Singles: 32 (20 titles, 12 runner-ups) ===
Legend
$100,000 tournaments
$75,000 tournaments
$50,000 tournaments
$25,000 tournaments
$10,000 tournaments

Result	W–L	Date	Tournament	Tier	Surface	Opponent	Score
Loss	0–1	Nov 2000	ITF Stockholm, Sweden	10,000	Hard (i)	(Germany) Sabrina Jolk	2–4, 4–0, 2–4, 2–4
Win	1–1	Sep 2001	ITF Sunderland, UK	10,000	Hard (i)	(France) Olivia Sanchez	6–3, 2–6, 6–0
Win	2–1	Nov 2001	ITF Stockholm, Sweden	10,000	Hard (i)	(Germany) Susi Bensch	6–1, 6–2
Win	3–1	Mar 2002	ITF Sunderland, UK	10,000	Carpet (i)	(Germany) Syna Schmidle	7–6, 3–5 ret.
Loss	3–2	May 2002	ITF Edinburgh, UK	25,000	Clay	(Czech Republic) Barbora Strýcová	6–4, 4–6, 6–7^{(2)}
Win	4–2	Jun 2002	ITF Båstad, Sweden	25,000	Clay	(Sweden) Maria Wolfbrandt	7–5, 6–4
Win	5–2	Oct 2002	ITF Southampton, UK	25,000	Hard (i)	(Belarus) Olga Barabanschikova	6–2, 1–6, 6–4
Loss	5–3	Dec 2002	ITF Průhonice, Czech Republic	25,000	Carpet (i)	(Ukraine) Anna Zaporozhanova	6–4, 4–6, 4–6
Loss	5–4	Feb 2003	ITF Ortisei, Italy	50,000	Carpet (i)	(Italy) Mara Santangelo	6–2, 2–6, 2–6
Win	6–4	Sep 2003	GB Pro-Series Glasgow, UK	25,000	Hard	(Netherlands) Tessy van de Ven	3–6, 6–4, 6–4
Loss	6–5	Oct 2003	ITF Jersey, UK	25,000	Hard (i)	(Austria) Sybille Bammer	6–7^{(1)}, 2–6
Win	7–5	Nov 2003	ITF Eugene, United States	50,000	Hard	(United States) Tara Snyder	6–4, 6–4
Win	8–5	Nov 2003	ITF Prague, Czech Republic	25,000	Carpet (i)	(France) Virginie Pichet	6–1, 6–2
Loss	8–6	Nov 2004	ITF Pittsburgh, US	50,000	Hard (i)	(United States) Shenay Perry	2–6, 1–6
Win	9–6	Feb 2005	ITF Sunderland, UK	25,000	Hard (i)	(Russia) Irina Bulykina	6–1, 6–1
Loss	9–7	May 2005	ITF Falkenberg, Sweden	10,000	Clay	(Sweden) Johanna Larsson	1–6, 3–6
Win	10–7	Feb 2007	ITF Saint Paul, US	50,000	Hard (i)	(Belarus) Olga Govortsova	2–6, 6–1, 6–4
Win	11–7	Jul 2007	ITF Båstad, Sweden	25,000	Clay	(Romania) Liana Ungur	6–7^{(7)}, 6–2, 6–0
Win	12–7	Oct 2007	Open de Touraine, France	50,000	Hard (i)	(Germany) Kristina Barrois	6–3, 6–2
Win	13–7	Oct 2007	GB Pro-Series Glasgow, UK (2)	25,000	Hard (i)	(United Kingdom) Katie O'Brien	6–3, 6–1
Win	14–7	May 2008	Zagreb Ladies Open, Croatia	75,000	Clay	(France) Séverine Brémond	7–6, 6–2
Loss	14–8	Nov 2008	Danish Open, Denmark	100,000	Carpet (i)	(Denmark) Caroline Wozniacki	2–6, 1–6
Win	15–8	Sep 2009	Saguenay Challenger, Canada	50,000	Hard (i)	(France) Séverine Brémond	5–7, 6–4, 7–6^{(1)}
Win	16–8	Oct 2009	Open de Touraine, France (2)	50,000	Hard (i)	(Australia) Jelena Dokić	6–2, 7–6^{(7)}
Loss	16–9	Nov 2009	ITF Poitiers, France	100,000	Hard (i)	(Australia) Jelena Dokić	4–6, 4–6
Win	17–9	Jul 2010	ITF Båstad, Sweden	25,000	Clay	(Russia) Valeria Savinykh	6–3, 6–1
Loss	17–10	Aug 2010	Bronx Open, US	100,000	Hard (i)	(Russia) Anna Chakvetadze	6–4, 2–6, 2–6
Win	18–10	Oct 2010	ITF Poitiers, France	100,000	Hard (i)	(France) Pauline Parmentier	6–2, 7–6^{(4)}
Loss	18–11	Oct 2011	Open de Limoges, France	50,000	Hard (i)	(Romania) Sorana Cîrstea	2–6, 2–6
Loss	18–12	Oct 2013	ITF Poitiers, France	100,000	Hard (i)	(Belarus) Aliaksandra Sasnovich	1–6, 7–5, 4–6
Win	19–12	Feb 2015	ITF Surprise, US	25,000	Hard	(United States) Sanaz Marand	6–2, 6–1
Win	20–12	Jun 2015	ITF Helsingborg, Sweden	25,000	Clay	(Sweden) Malin Ulvefeldt	6–7^{(4)}, 6–1, 6–2

=== Doubles: 16 (13 titles, 3 runner-ups) ===
Legend
$100,000 tournaments
$75,000 tournaments
$50,000 tournaments
$25,000 tournaments
$10,000 tournaments

Result	W–L	Date	Tournament	Tier	Surface	Partner	Opponents	Score
Win	1–0	Jul 2000	ITF Båstad, Sweden	10,000	Clay	(Sweden) Kristina Jarkenstadt	(Austria) Susanne Flipp (Sweden) Maria Wolfbrandt	6–4, 7–5
Loss	1–1	Nov 2000	ITF Stockholm, Sweden	10,000	Hard (i)	(Sweden) Kristina Jarkenstadt	(Sweden) Jenny Lindstrom (Sweden) Maria Wolfbrandt	0–4, 3–5, 0–4
Win	2–1	Mar 2002	ITF Buchen, Germany	10,000	Carpet (i)	(Luxembourg) Claudine Schaul	(Russia) Anna Bastrikova (Germany) Claudia Kardys	6–0, 7–5
Win	3–1	Oct 2003	ITF Jersey, UK	25,000	Hard (i)	(Estonia) Kaia Kanepi	(Austria) Yvonne Meusburger (Sweden) Hanna Nooni	6–3, 7–5
Win	4–1	Feb 2004	Midland Classic, US	75,000	Hard (i)	(Sweden) Åsa Svensson	(United States) Allison Baker (United States) Tara Snyder	7–6^{(5)}, 6–2
Loss	4–2	May 2004	ITF Stockholm, Sweden	25,000	Clay	(Sweden) Hanna Nooni	(Belarus) Nadejda Ostrovskaya (Serbia) Dragana Zarić	6–7^{(3)}, 3–6
Win	5–2	Jul 2004	ITF Los Gatos, US	50,000	Hard	(Turkey) İpek Şenoğlu	(Japan) Nana Smith (United States) Lilia Osterloh	6–1, 2–6, 6–4
Win	6–2	Feb 2005	ITF Sunderland, UK	25,000	Hard (i)	(Germany) Martina Müller	(Serbia and Montenegro) Dragana Zarić (Serbia and Montenegro) Katarina Mišić	6–2, 6–3
Win	7–2	Feb 2007	ITF St. Paul, US	50,000	Hard (i)	(Italy) Antonella Serra Zanetti	(Bosnia and Herzegovina) Mervana Jugić-Salkić (Turkey) İpek Şenoğlu	7–6^{(4)}, 5–7, 7–6^{(7)}
Win	8–2	Oct 2007	Open Nantes Atlantique, France	25,000	Hard (i)	(Sweden) Johanna Larsson	(United Kingdom) Melanie South (Belgium) Caroline Maes	4–6, 7–5, [10–7]
Win	9–2	Oct 2007	GB Pro-Series Glasgow, UK	25,000	Hard (i)	(Sweden) Johanna Larsson	(Czech Republic) Veronika Chvojková (Germany) Kathrin Wörle	6–2, 6–3
Loss	9–3	Jun 2009	ITF Kristinehamn, Sweden	25,000	Clay	(Sweden) Sandra Roma	(Denmark) Hanne Skak Jensen (Sweden) Johanna Larsson	6–7^{(5)}, 2–6
Win	10–3	Jul 2009	ITF Ystad, Sweden	25,000	Clay	(Sweden) Sandra Roma	(Sweden) Hanna Nooni (Austria) Melanie Klaffner	6–4, 6–4
Win	11–3	Sep 2009	Saguenay Challenger, Canada	50,000	Hard (i)	(France) Séverine Brémond	(Canada) Stéphanie Dubois (Canada) Rebecca Marino	6–3, 6–1
Win	12–3	Nov 2009	Slovak Open, Slovakia	50,000	Hard (i)	(Netherlands) Michaëlla Krajicek	(Russia) Arina Rodionova (Belarus) Tatiana Poutchek	6–3, 6–4
Win	13–3	Oct 2011	Open de Limoges, France	50,000	Hard (i)	(United States) Jill Craybas	(France) Aurélie Védy (France) Caroline Garcia	6–4, 4–6, [10–7]

== Top 10 wins ==
#	Player	Rank	Event	Surface	Round	Score	SAR
2008
1.	(France) Marion Bartoli	No. 10	Australian Open	Hard	1R	6–7^{(3)}, 6–4, 6–3	
2.	(Russia) Anna Chakvetadze	No. 6	Diamond Games, Belgium	Hard (i)	2R	6–3, 7–5	
2011
3.	(Serbia) Jelena Janković	No. 10	Brussels Open, Belgium	Clay	2R	3–6, 6–3, 6–3	
4.	(Denmark) Caroline Wozniacki	No. 1	Swedish Open	Clay	2R	2–6, 1–0 ret.	
5.	(Czech Republic) Petra Kvitová	No. 5	China Open	Hard	2R	7–6^{(6)}, 4–6, 6–3	
2012
6.	(France) Marion Bartoli	No. 10	Kremlin Cup, Russia	Hard (i)	2R	6–3, 6–0	
2013
7.	(Australia) Samantha Stosur	No. 9	Brisbane International, Australia	Hard	1R	7–6^{(4)}, 7–5	
