= 2012 Open GDF Suez Région Limousin =

- Date: 15–21 October
- Edition: 6th
- Location: Limoges, France

Champions

Singles
- (France) Claire Feuerstein

Doubles
- (Poland) Magda Linette / (Poland) Sandra Zaniewska
- Open GDF Suez Région Limousin

The 2012 Open GDF Suez Région Limousin was a professional tennis tournament played on indoor hard courts. It was the sixth edition of the tournament which was part of the 2012 ITF Women's Circuit. It took place in Limoges, France on 15–21 October 2012.

== WTA entrants ==
=== Seeds ===
Country	Player	Rank^{1}	Seed
RUS	Alexandra Panova	87	1
FRA	Kristina Mladenovic	95	2
FRA	Stéphanie Foretz Gacon	97	3
JPN	Kimiko Date-Krumm	103	4
GRE	Eleni Daniilidou	108	5
SUI	Stefanie Vögele	120	6
ITA	Karin Knapp	122	7
CHN	Zhang Shuai	124	8

- ^{1} Rankings are as of 8 October 2012.

=== Other entrants ===
The following players received wildcards into the singles main draw:

- (France) Josepha Adam
- (France) Audrey Bergot
- (France) Alix Collombon
- (France) Fiona Ferro

The following players received entry from the qualifying draw:

- (Slovakia) Zuzana Luknárová
- (Netherlands) Angelique van der Meet
- (Russia) Natalia Orlova
- (France) Constance Sibille

== Champions ==
=== Singles ===
- (France) Claire Feuerstein def. (Ukraine) Maryna Zanevska, 7–5, 6–3

=== Doubles ===
- (Poland) Magda Linette / (Poland) Sandra Zaniewska def. (France) Irena Pavlovic / (Switzerland) Stefanie Vögele, 6–1, 5–7, [10–5]
