= 2023 Open de Limoges – Singles =

Singles
- 2023 Open de Limoges

Final
- Champion: (Spain) Cristina Bucșa
- Runner-up: (France) Elsa Jacquemot
- Score: 2–6, 6–1, 6–2

Details
- Draw: 32 (4 Q / 5 WC)
- Seeds: 8

Events
Singles	Doubles
← 2022 ·	Open de Limoges	· 2024 →

Cristina Bucșa won the singles title at the 2023 Open de Limoges, defeating Elsa Jacquemot in the final, 2–6, 6–1, 6–2.

Anhelina Kalinina was the reigning champion, but did not participate this year.

== Seeds ==
1. (Italy) Elisabetta Cocciaretto (quarterfinals)
2. Anna Blinkova (semifinals)
3. (Netherlands) Arantxa Rus (second round)
4. (France) Clara Burel (withdrew)
5. (Spain) Cristina Bucșa (champion)
6. (France) Alizé Cornet (second round, withdrew)
7. Erika Andreeva (semifinals)
8. (Sweden) Rebecca Peterson (second round)

== Draw ==
=== Key ===
- Q = Qualifier
- WC = Wild card
- LL = Lucky loser
- Alt = Alternate
- SE = Special exempt
- PR = Protected ranking
- ITF = ITF entry
- JE = Junior exempt
- w/o = Walkover
- r = Retired
- d = Defaulted
- SR = Special ranking

=== Finals ===
Semifinals
7	Erika Andreeva	2	6	2
(France) Elsa Jacquemot	6	3	6
5	(Spain) Cristina Bucșa	6	6
2	Anna Blinkova	3	2

Final
(France) Elsa Jacquemot	6	1	2
5	(Spain) Cristina Bucșa	2	6	6

=== Top half ===
First round
1/WC	(Italy) E Cocciaretto	1	6	6
WC	(France) A Hesse	6	2	3
(Latvia) D Semeņistaja	4	6	6
(Germany) N Noha Akugue	6	4	3
(United States) M Kessler	4	6	6
(France) M Rouvroy	6	1	0
(Turkey) Z Sönmez	3	2
7	E Andreeva	6	6
3	(Netherlands) A Rus	6	6
(Czech Republic) G Knutson	3	2
(France) E Jacquemot	7	6
(Turkey) B Cengiz	5	1
WC	(Latvia) A Sevastova	6	6
PR	(Romania) PM Țig	4	1
(Germany) M Barthel	6^{3}	5
8	(Sweden) R Peterson	7^{7}	7

Second round
1/WC	(Italy) E Cocciaretto	6	6
(Latvia) D Semeņistaja	3	4
(United States) M Kessler	6	5	2
7	E Andreeva	4	7	6
3	(Netherlands) A Rus	4	4
(France) E Jacquemot	6	6
WC	(Latvia) A Sevastova	6	6
8	(Sweden) R Peterson	2	3

Quarterfinals
1/WC	(Italy) E Cocciaretto	0	2
7	E Andreeva	6	6
(France) E Jacquemot	7^{7}	2	7
WC	(Latvia) A Sevastova	6^{4}	6	5

Semifinals
7	E Andreeva	2	6	2
(France) E Jacquemot	6	3	6

=== Bottom half ===
First round
5	(Spain) C Bucșa	6	6
LL	(France) N Berecoechea	3	1
WC	(France) A Albié	6	6
Q	(France) A Rezaï	1	0
WC	(France) L Boisson	6	6
(France) K Mladenovic	2	2
(France) A Robbe	6	3	6^{5}
LL	(United States) A Smith	4	6	7^{7}
6	(France) A Cornet	6	6
Q	(Liechtenstein) K von Deichmann	2	2
(Hungary) F Stollár	3	1
(France) H Tan	6	6
Q	(Switzerland) S Bandecchi	4	1^{r}
(Uzbekistan) N Abduraimova	6	3
Q	(Ukraine) V Podrez	3	1
2	A Blinkova	6	6

Second round
5	(Spain) C Bucșa	6	6
WC	(France) A Albié	3	4
WC	(France) L Boisson	6	6
LL	(United States) A Smith	4	0
6	(France) A Cornet
(France) H Tan	w/o
(Uzbekistan) N Abduraimova	4	0
2	A Blinkova	6	6

Quarterfinals
5	(Spain) C Bucșa	7^{7}	6
WC	(France) L Boisson	6^{3}	2
(France) H Tan	3	7	6^{3}
2	A Blinkova	6	5	7^{7}

Semifinals
5	(Spain) C Bucșa	6	6
2	A Blinkova	3	2

== Qualifying ==
=== Seeds ===
1. (Liechtenstein) Kathinka von Deichmann (qualified)
2. (Switzerland) Susan Bandecchi (qualified)
3. (France) Nahia Berecoechea (qualifying competition, lucky loser)
4. (United States) Alana Smith (qualifying competition, lucky loser)

=== Qualifiers ===
1. (Liechtenstein) Kathinka von Deichmann
2. (Switzerland) Susan Bandecchi
3. (France) Aravane Rezaï
4. (Ukraine) Veronika Podrez

=== Lucky losers ===
1. (France) Nahia Berecoechea
2. (United States) Alana Smith

=== Qualifying draw ===
==== First qualifier ====
Qualifying competition
1	(Liechtenstein) Kathinka von Deichmann
	Bye

==== Second qualifier ====
Qualifying competition
2	(Switzerland) Susan Bandecchi	6	6
WC	(France) Tiphanie Lemaître	4	4

==== Third qualifier ====
Qualifying competition
3	(France) Nahia Berecoechea	6^{1}	4
WC	(France) Aravane Rezaï	7^{7}	6

==== Fourth qualifier ====
Qualifying competition
4	(United States) Alana Smith	4	4
	(Ukraine) Veronika Podrez	6	6
