= 2021 Open de Limoges =

- Date: 13–19 December
- Edition: 14th
- Category: WTA 125K series
- Prize money: $115,000
- Surface: Hard (Indoor)
- Location: Limoges, France
- Venue: Palais des Sports de Beaublanc

Champions

Singles
- (Belgium) Alison Van Uytvanck

Doubles
- (Romania) Monica Niculescu / (Russia) Vera Zvonareva
← 2019 ·	Open de Limoges	· 2022 →

The 2021 Open de Limoges was a professional tennis tournament played on indoor hard courts. It was the 14th edition of the tournament and part of the 2021 WTA 125 tournaments series, offering a total of $115,000 in prize money. It took place at the Palais des Sports de Beaublanc in Limoges, France, from 13 to 19 December 2021.

== Singles entrants ==
=== Seeds ===
Country	Player	Rank^{1}	Seed
CHN	Zhang Shuai	62	1
BEL	Alison Van Uytvanck	68	2
FRA	Caroline Garcia	74	3
BEL	Greet Minnen	75	4
RUS	Varvara Gracheva	79	5
RUS	Vera Zvonareva	87	6
FRA	Kristina Mladenovic	93	7
ROU	Ana Bogdan	113	8

- ^{1} Rankings as of 6 December 2021.

=== Other entrants ===
The following players received wildcards into the singles main draw:

- (France) Audrey Albié
- (United States) Robin Montgomery
- (France) Mallaurie Noël
- (Belgium) Alison Van Uytvanck

The following players received entry from the qualifying draw:

- (France) Elsa Jacquemot
- (France) Léolia Jeanjean
- (France) Marine Partaud
- (Romania) Andreea Roșca

=== Withdrawals ===
Before the tournament

- (France) Clara Burel → replaced by (India) Ankita Raina
- (Romania) Mihaela Buzărnescu → replaced by (Russia) Anna Blinkova
- (Romania) Jaqueline Cristian → replaced by (Italy) Lucia Bronzetti
- (Serbia) Olga Danilović → replaced by (Germany) Tamara Korpatsch
- (France) Océane Dodin → replaced by (Russia) Natalia Vikhlyantseva
- (Germany) Anna-Lena Friedsam → replaced by (Georgia (country)) Mariam Bolkvadze
- (Ukraine) Anhelina Kalinina → replaced by (Spain) Cristina Bucșa
- (France) Chloé Paquet → replaced by (Belarus) Iryna Shymanovich
- (Ukraine) Dayana Yastremska → replaced by (France) Jessika Ponchet

== Doubles entrants ==
=== Seeds ===
Country	Player	Country	Player	Rank^{1}	Seed
ROU	Monica Niculescu	RUS	Vera Zvonareva	93	1
BEL	Greet Minnen	SRB	Nina Stojanović	132	2

- ^{1} Rankings as of 6 December 2021.

== Champions ==
=== Singles ===
- (Belgium) Alison Van Uytvanck def. (Romania) Ana Bogdan 6–2, 7–5

=== Doubles ===
- (Romania) Monica Niculescu / (Russia) Vera Zvonareva def. (France) Estelle Cascino / (France) Jessika Ponchet 6–4, 6–4
