= 2024 Open de Limoges =

- Date: 9–15 December
- Edition: 17th
- Category: WTA 125
- Prize money: $115,000
- Surface: Hard (Indoor)
- Location: Limoges, France
- Venue: Palais des Sports de Beaublanc

Champions

Singles
- (Switzerland) Viktorija Golubic

Doubles
- (France) Elsa Jacquemot / (France) Margaux Rouvroy
← 2023 ·	Open de Limoges	· 2025 →

The 2024 Open BLS de Limoges was a professional women's tennis tournament played on indoor hard courts. It was the 17th edition of the tournament and part of the 2024 WTA 125 tournaments series, offering a total of $115,000 in prize money. It took place at the Palais des Sports de Beaublanc in Limoges, France, from 9 to 15 December 2024.

== Champions ==
=== Singles ===
- (Switzerland) Viktorija Golubic def. (Switzerland) Céline Naef 7–5, 6–4

=== Doubles ===
- (France) Elsa Jacquemot / (France) Margaux Rouvroy def. Erika Andreeva / (France) Séléna Janicijevic 6–4, 6–3

== Singles entrants ==
=== Seeds ===
Country	Player	Rank^{1}	Seed
	Ekaterina Alexandrova	28	1
UKR	Dayana Yastremska	33	2
~~FRA~~	~~Clara Burel~~	~~73~~	~~3~~
	Anna Blinkova	75	4
	Erika Andreeva	79	5
ESP	Nuria Párrizas Díaz	99	6
SUI	Viktorija Golubic	109	7
	Anastasia Zakharova	112	8
FRA	Océane Dodin	113	9

- ^{1} Rankings as of 2 December 2024.

=== Other entrants ===
The following players received wildcards into the singles main draw:

- Ekaterina Alexandrova
- ~~(Switzerland) Belinda Bencic~~
- (France) Carole Monnet
- (France) Margaux Rouvroy
- (Austria) Lilli Tagger
- (Ukraine) Dayana Yastremska

The following players received entry from the qualifying draw:

- Alina Charaeva
- (France) Yasmine Mansouri
- (Turkey) İpek Öz
- (Romania) Patricia Maria Țig

The following player received entry as a lucky loser:

- Ekaterina Makarova
- (France) Manon Léonard

=== Withdrawals ===
- (Switzerland) Belinda Bencic → replaced by (France) Manon Léonard
- (France) Clara Burel → replaced by Ekaterina Makarova

== Doubles entrants ==
=== Seeds ===
Country	Player	Country	Player	Rank^{1}	Seed
	Ekaterina Alexandrova		Yana Sizikova	109	1
GBR	Emily Appleton	GBR	Maia Lumsden	171	2

- ^{1} Rankings as of 2 December 2024.

=== Other entrants ===
The following pair received a wildcard into the doubles main draw:

- (France) Elsa Jacquemot / (France) Margaux Rouvroy
