= 2021 Open de Limoges – Singles =

Singles
- 2021 Open de Limoges

Final
- Champion: (Belgium) Alison Van Uytvanck
- Runner-up: (Romania) Ana Bogdan
- Score: 6–2, 7–5

Events
Singles	Doubles
← 2019 ·	Open de Limoges	· 2022 →

Ekaterina Alexandrova was the defending champion, but chose not to participate in 2021.

Alison Van Uytvanck won the title, defeating Ana Bogdan in the final, 6–2, 7–5.

== Seeds ==
1. (China) Zhang Shuai (first round)
2. (Belgium) Alison Van Uytvanck (champion)
3. (France) Caroline Garcia (quarterfinals)
4. (Belgium) Greet Minnen (quarterfinals)
5. (Russia) Varvara Gracheva (semifinals)
6. (Russia) Vera Zvonareva (semifinals)
7. (France) Kristina Mladenovic (quarterfinals)
8. (Romania) Ana Bogdan (final)

== Draw ==
=== Key ===
- Q = Qualifier
- WC = Wild card
- LL = Lucky loser
- Alt = Alternate
- ITF = ITF entry
- PR = Protected ranking
- SR = Special ranking
- SE = Special exempt
- JE = Junior exempt
- JR = Junior Accelerator Programme entrant
- CO = College Accelerator Programme entrant
- NG = Next Gen Accelerator Program entrant
- w/o = Walkover
- r = Retired
- d = Defaulted

=== Finals ===
Semifinals
8	(Romania) Ana Bogdan	7	2	6
5	(Russia) Varvara Gracheva	5	6	3
6	(Russia) Vera Zvonareva	1	4
2/WC	(Belgium) Alison Van Uytvanck	6	6

Final
8	(Romania) Ana Bogdan	2	5
2/WC	(Belgium) Alison Van Uytvanck	6	7

=== Top half ===
First round
1	(China) S Zhang	4	6	2
(France) J Ponchet	6	3	6
WC	(United States) R Montgomery	6	4	4
(Slovenia) P Hercog	4	6	6
Q	(France) L Jeanjean	6^{3}	4
WC	(France) M Noël	7^{7}	6
(Georgia (country)) M Bolkvadze	2	1
8	(Romania) A Bogdan	6	6
4	(Belgium) G Minnen	3	6	6
Q	(Romania) A Roșca	6	1	1
(Bulgaria) V Tomova	3	4
(Switzerland) S Vögele	6	6
(Italy) L Bronzetti	3	7^{8}	2
(Spain) C Bucșa	6	6^{6}	6
(Germany) T Korpatsch	3	5
5	(Russia) V Gracheva	6	7

Second round
(France) J Ponchet	6	6
(Slovenia) P Hercog	3	4
WC	(France) M Noël	3	2
8	(Romania) A Bogdan	6	6
4	(Belgium) G Minnen	6	6
(Switzerland) S Vögele	4	2
(Spain) C Bucșa	6	2	4
5	(Russia) V Gracheva	4	6	6

Quarterfinals
(France) J Ponchet	5	5
8	(Romania) A Bogdan	7	7
4	(Belgium) G Minnen	3	7	1
5	(Russia) V Gracheva	6	5	6

Semifinals
8	(Romania) A Bogdan	7	2	6
5	(Russia) V Gracheva	5	6	3

=== Bottom half ===
First round
6	(Russia) V Zvonareva	6	4	7
(Russia) N Vikhlyantseva	3	6	5
(Latvia) D Vismane	2	0
(Serbia) N Stojanović	6	6
(Russia) A Blinkova	6^{7}	1
Q	(France) E Jacquemot	7^{9}	6
(India) A Raina	6^{7}	6	4
3	(France) C Garcia	7^{9}	4	6
7	(France) K Mladenovic	7	4	6
Q	(France) M Partaud	5	6	0
WC	(France) A Albié	2	3
(Norway) U Eikeri	6	6
(Germany) T Maria	6	6
(Belarus) I Shymanovich	3	3
(Russia) V Diatchenko	1	3
2/WC	(Belgium) A Van Uytvanck	6	6

Second round
6	(Russia) V Zvonareva	7	6
(Serbia) N Stojanović	5	4
Q	(France) E Jacquemot	1	7^{9}	5
3	(France) C Garcia	6	6^{7}	7
7	(France) K Mladenovic	7	6
(Norway) U Eikeri	5	2
(Germany) T Maria	2	3
2/WC	(Belgium) A Van Uytvanck	6	6

Quarterfinals
6	(Russia) V Zvonareva	6	6
3	(France) C Garcia	4	3
7	(France) K Mladenovic	4	4
2/WC	(Belgium) A Van Uytvanck	6	6

Semifinals
6	(Russia) V Zvonareva	1	4
2/WC	(Belgium) A Van Uytvanck	6	6

== Qualifying ==
=== Seeds ===
1. (France) Elsa Jacquemot (qualified)
2. (Romania) Andreea Roșca (qualified)
3. (France) Léolia Jeanjean (qualified)
4. (France) Marine Partaud (qualified)
5. (France) Estelle Cascino (qualifying competition)
6. (France) Margaux Rouvroy (qualifying competition)
7. (Germany) Jasmin Jebawy (qualifying competition)
8. (France) Evita Ramirez (qualifying competition)

=== Qualifiers ===
1. (France) Elsa Jacquemot
2. (Romania) Andreea Roșca
3. (France) Léolia Jeanjean
4. (France) Marine Partaud

=== Qualifying draw ===
==== First qualifier ====
Qualifying competition
1	(France) Elsa Jacquemot	6	4	6
6/WC	(France) Margaux Rouvroy	1	6	1

==== Second qualifier ====
Qualifying competition
2	(Romania) Andreea Roșca	6	6
7	(Germany) Jasmin Jebawy	0	0

==== Third qualifier ====
Qualifying competition
3	(France) Léolia Jeanjean	4	6	6
8/WC	(France) Evita Ramírez	6	2	0

==== Fourth qualifier ====
Qualifying competition
4	(France) Marine Partaud	7	6
5	(France) Estelle Cascino	5	4
