= 2024 Open de Limoges – Singles =

Singles
- 2024 Open de Limoges

Final
- Champion: (Switzerland) Viktorija Golubic
- Runner-up: (Switzerland) Céline Naef
- Score: 7–5, 6–4

Details
- Draw: 32 (4 Q / 5 WC)
- Seeds: 8

Events
| Singles | Doubles |
| ← 2023 · | Open de Limoges | · 2025 → |

Cristina Bucșa was the reigning champion, but did not participate this year.

Viktorija Golubic won the title at the 2024 Open de Limoges, defeating fellow Swiss Céline Naef in the final, 7–5, 6–4. It was her fourth WTA 125 title.

== Seeds ==
1. Ekaterina Alexandrova (first round)
2. (Ukraine) Dayana Yastremska (second round)
3. (France) Clara Burel (withdrew)
4. Anna Blinkova (second round)
5. Erika Andreeva (quarterfinals)
6. (Spain) Nuria Párrizas Díaz (semifinals, retired)
7. (Switzerland) Viktorija Golubic (champion)
8. Anastasia Zakharova (second round)
9. (France) Océane Dodin (first round)

== Draw ==
Key

- Q = Qualifier
- WC = Wild card
- LL = Lucky loser
- Alt = Alternate
- ITF = ITF entry
- PR = Protected ranking
- SR = Special ranking
- SE = Special exempt
- JE = Junior exempt
- JR = Junior Accelerator Programme entrant
- CO = College Accelerator Programme entrant
- NG = Next Gen Accelerator Program entrant
- w/o = Walkover
- r = Retired
- d = Defaulted

=== Finals ===
Semifinals
(France) Elsa Jacquemot | 3 | 7^{7} | 3
(Switzerland) Céline Naef | 6 | 6^{5} | 6
6 | (Spain) Nuria Párrizas Díaz | 6^{2} | 0^{r}
7 | (Switzerland) Viktorija Golubic | 7^{7} | 1

Final
(Switzerland) Céline Naef | 5 | 4
7 | (Switzerland) Viktorija Golubic | 7 | 6

=== Top half ===
First round
1/WC | E Alexandrova | 4 | 5
(Germany) T Korpatsch | 6 | 7
LL | (France) M Léonard | 6 | 6
(France) S Janicijevic | 4 | 3
A Tikhonova | 4 | 4
(France) E Jacquemot | 6 | 6
Q | (France) Y Mansouri | 3 | 4
8 | A Zakharova | 6 | 6
9 | (France) O Dodin | 3 | 1
(Switzerland) C Naef | 6 | 6
(Croatia) P Martić | 4 | 3
(Japan) S Saito | 6 | 6
(Liechtenstein) K von Deichmann | 7^{9} | 3 | 7^{8}
P Kudermetova | 6^{7} | 6 | 6^{6}
Q | (Turkey) İ Öz | 6^{5} | 4
5 | E Andreeva | 7^{7} | 6

Second round
(Germany) T Korpatsch | 6^{6} | 1
LL | (France) M Léonard | 7^{8} | 6
(France) E Jacquemot | 6 | 6
8 | A Zakharova | 1 | 2
(Switzerland) C Naef | 6 | 6
(Japan) S Saito | 0 | 2
(Liechtenstein) K von Deichmann | 3 | 6 | 3
5 | E Andreeva | 6 | 2 | 6

Quarterfinals
LL | (France) M Léonard | 2 | 4
(France) E Jacquemot | 6 | 6
(Switzerland) C Naef | 7 | 6
5 | E Andreeva | 5 | 4

Semifinals
(France) E Jacquemot | 3 | 7^{7} | 3
(Switzerland) C Naef | 6 | 6^{5} | 6

=== Bottom half ===
First round
6 | (Spain) N Párrizas Díaz | 6 | 3 | 7
(Switzerland) J Teichmann | 4 | 6 | 5
WC | (Austria) L Tagger | 3 | 6 | 6
(Andorra) V Jiménez Kasintseva | 6 | 3 | 2
WC | (France) M Rouvroy | 3 | 7^{7} | 4
(United States) V Lepchenko | 6 | 6^{3} | 6
(Romania) E-G Ruse | 4 | 1
4 | A Blinkova | 6 | 6
7 | (Switzerland) V Golubic | 6 | 6
LL | E Makarova | 4 | 1
Q | (Romania) PM Țig | 4 | 1
(Georgia (country)) M Bolkvadze | 6 | 6
(Germany) E Seidel | 4 | 4
WC | (France) C Monnet | 6 | 6
Q | A Charaeva | 4 | 4
2/WC | (Ukraine) D Yastremska | 6 | 6

Second round
6 | (Spain) N Párrizas Díaz | 6 | 6
WC | (Austria) L Tagger | 1 | 3
(United States) V Lepchenko | 6 | 6
4 | A Blinkova | 0 | 0
7 | (Switzerland) V Golubic | 6 | 6
(Georgia (country)) M Bolkvadze | 4 | 4
WC | (France) C Monnet | 6 | 6
2/WC | (Ukraine) D Yastremska | 4 | 4

Quarterfinals
6 | (Spain) N Párrizas Díaz | 6 | 6
(United States) V Lepchenko | 3 | 2
7 | (Switzerland) V Golubic | 4 | 6 | 7
WC | (France) C Monnet | 6 | 0 | 5

Semifinals
6 | (Spain) N Párrizas Díaz | 6^{2} | 0^{r}
7 | (Switzerland) V Golubic | 7^{7} | 1

== Qualifying ==
=== Seeds ===
1. Ekaterina Makarova (qualifying competition, lucky loser)
2. (Turkey) İpek Öz (qualified)
3. (France) Manon Léonard (qualifying competition, lucky loser)
4. (Lithuania) Justina Mikulskytė (qualifying competition)

=== Qualifiers ===
1. (France) Yasmine Mansouri
2. (Turkey) İpek Öz
3. (Romania) Patricia Maria Țig
4. Alina Charaeva

=== Lucky losers ===
1. Ekaterina Makarova
2. (France) Manon Léonard

=== Qualifying draw ===
==== First qualifier ====
| Qualifying competition |
| 1 | Ekaterina Makarova | 4 | 3 |
| WC | (France) Yasmine Mansouri | 6 | 6 |

==== Second qualifier ====
| Qualifying competition |
| 2 | (Turkey) İpek Öz | 6^{8} | 6 | 6 |
| WC | (France) Sara Cakarevic | 7^{10} | 2 | 2 |

==== Third qualifier ====
| Qualifying competition |
| 3 | (France) Manon Léonard | 3 | 6 | 1 |
| | (Romania) Patricia Maria Țig | 6 | 1 | 6 |

==== Fourth qualifier ====
| Qualifying competition |
| 4 | (Lithuania) Justina Mikulskytė | 2 | 4 |
| | Alina Charaeva | 6 | 6 |
