= 2022 Open de Limoges – Doubles =

Doubles
- 2022 Open de Limoges

Final
- Champions: (Georgia (country)) Oksana Kalashnikova (Ukraine) Marta Kostyuk
- Runners-up: (United Kingdom) Alicia Barnett (United Kingdom) Olivia Nicholls
- Score: 7–5, 6–1

Details
- Draw: 8 (1 WC)
- Seeds: 2

Events
Singles	Doubles
← 2021 ·	Open de Limoges	· 2023 →

Monica Niculescu and Vera Zvonareva were the defending champions, but Zvonareva chose not to participate. Niculescu partnered Ana Bogdan, but lost in the first round to Jessika Ponchet and Renata Voráčová.

Oksana Kalashnikova and Marta Kostyuk won the title, defeating Alicia Barnett and Olivia Nicholls in the final, 7–5, 6–1.

== Seeds ==
1. (Georgia (country)) Oksana Kalashnikova / (Ukraine) Marta Kostyuk (champions)
2. (Georgia (country)) Natela Dzalamidze / Alexandra Panova (quarterfinals)

== Draw ==
=== Key ===
- Q = Qualifier
- WC = Wild card
- LL = Lucky loser
- Alt = Alternate
- SE = Special exempt
- PR = Protected ranking
- ITF = ITF entry
- JE = Junior exempt
- w/o = Walkover
- r = Retired
- d = Defaulted
- SR = Special ranking

=== Draw ===
Quarterfinals
1	(Georgia (country)) O Kalashnikova (Ukraine) M Kostyuk	6	6^{3}	[10]
WC	(France) E Lechemia (France) M Partaud	3	7^{7}	[4]
A Fomina-Klotz (Germany) J Lohoff	2	4
A Blinkova (Czech Republic) A Dețiuc	6	6
(Romania) A Bogdan (Romania) M Niculescu	6	5	[7]
SR	(France) J Ponchet (Czech Republic) R Voráčová	4	7	[10]
(United Kingdom) A Barnett (United Kingdom) O Nicholls	6	7^{7}
2	(Georgia (country)) N Dzalamidze; A Panova	3	6^{4}

Semifinals
1	(Georgia (country)) O Kalashnikova (Ukraine) M Kostyuk	6	6
A Blinkova (Czech Republic) A Dețiuc	4	1
SR	(France) J Ponchet (Czech Republic) R Voráčová	6	6^{5}	[4]
(United Kingdom) A Barnett (United Kingdom) O Nicholls	2	7^{7}	[10]

Final
1	(Georgia (country)) O Kalashnikova (Ukraine) M Kostyuk	7	6
(United Kingdom) A Barnett (United Kingdom) O Nicholls	5	1
