= 2023 Open de Limoges =

- Date: 11–17 December
- Edition: 16th
- Category: WTA 125
- Prize money: $115,000
- Surface: Hard (Indoor)
- Location: Limoges, France
- Venue: Palais des Sports de Beaublanc

Champions

Singles
- (Spain) Cristina Bucșa

Doubles
- (Spain) Cristina Bucșa / Yana Sizikova
← 2022 ·	Open de Limoges	· 2024 →

The 2023 Open BLS de Limoges was a professional women's tennis tournament played on indoor hard courts. It was the 16th edition of the tournament and part of the 2023 WTA 125 tournaments series, offering a total of $115,000 in prize money. It took place at the Palais des Sports de Beaublanc in Limoges, France, from 11 to 17 December 2023.

== Champions ==
=== Singles ===
- (Spain) Cristina Bucșa def. (France) Elsa Jacquemot 2–6, 6–1, 6–2

=== Doubles ===
- (Spain) Cristina Bucșa / Yana Sizikova def. (Georgia (country)) Oksana Kalashnikova / (United Kingdom) Maia Lumsden 6–4, 6–1

== Singles entrants ==
=== Seeds ===
Country	Player	Rank^{1}	Seed
ITA	Elisabetta Cocciaretto	48	1
	Anna Blinkova	50	2
NED	Arantxa Rus	51	3
~~FRA~~	~~Clara Burel~~	~~60~~	~~4~~
ESP	Cristina Bucșa	90	5
FRA	Alizé Cornet	116	6
	Erika Andreeva	122	7
SWE	Rebecca Peterson	132	8

- ^{1} Rankings as of 4 December 2023.

=== Other entrants ===
The following players received wildcards into the singles main draw:

- (France) Audrey Albié
- (France) Loïs Boisson
- (Italy) Elisabetta Cocciaretto
- (France) Amandine Hesse
- (Latvia) Anastasija Sevastova

The following player received entry using a protected ranking:

- (Romania) Patricia Maria Țig

The following players received entry from the qualifying draw:

- (Switzerland) Susan Bandecchi
- (Ukraine) Veronika Podrez
- (France) Aravane Rezaï
- (Liechtenstein) Kathinka von Deichmann

The following players received entry as lucky losers:

- (France) Nahia Berecoechea
- (United States) Alana Smith

=== Withdrawals ===
Before the tournament

- (China) Bai Zhuoxuan → replaced by (France) Elsa Jacquemot
- (France) Clara Burel → replaced by (United States) Alana Smith
- (United Kingdom) Jodie Burrage → replaced by (Germany) Noma Noha Akugue
- (France) Océane Dodin → replaced by (France) Nahia Berecoechea
- (Germany) Tamara Korpatsch → replaced by (Turkey) Berfu Cengiz
- (Germany) Eva Lys → replaced by (France) Alice Robbe
- (United States) Elizabeth Mandlik → replaced by (Germany) Mona Barthel
- (Czech Republic) Tereza Martincová → replaced by (Uzbekistan) Nigina Abduraimova
- (Spain) Nuria Párrizas Díaz → replaced by (France) Margaux Rouvroy
- (France) Jessika Ponchet → replaced by (France) Kristina Mladenovic
- (Denmark) Clara Tauson → replaced by (France) Harmony Tan
- (Belgium) Yanina Wickmayer → replaced by (United States) McCartney Kessler

== Doubles entrants ==
=== Seeds ===
Country	Player	Country	Player	Rank^{1}	Seed
KAZ	Anna Danilina		Alexandra Panova	117	1
GEO	Oksana Kalashnikova	GBR	Maia Lumsden	118	2

- ^{1} Rankings as of 4 December 2023.

=== Other entrants ===
The following pair received a wildcard into the doubles main draw:

- (France) Jessika Ponchet / (Hungary) Fanny Stollár
