= 2022 Open de Limoges =

- Date: 11–17 December
- Edition: 15th
- Category: WTA 125
- Prize money: $115,000
- Surface: Hard (Indoor)
- Location: Limoges, France
- Venue: Palais des Sports de Beaublanc

Champions

Singles
- (Ukraine) Anhelina Kalinina

Doubles
- (Georgia (country)) Oksana Kalashnikova / (Ukraine) Marta Kostyuk
← 2021 ·	Open de Limoges	· 2023 →

The 2022 Open BLS de Limoges was a professional tennis tournament played on indoor hard courts. It was the 15th edition of the tournament and part of the 2022 WTA 125 tournaments series, offering a total of $115,000 in prize money. It took place at the Palais des Sports de Beaublanc in Limoges, France, from 11 to 17 December 2022.

== Champions ==
=== Singles ===
- (Ukraine) Anhelina Kalinina def. (Denmark) Clara Tauson, 6–3, 5–7, 6–4.

=== Doubles ===
- (Georgia (country)) Oksana Kalashnikova / (Ukraine) Marta Kostyuk def. (United Kingdom) Alicia Barnett / (United Kingdom) Olivia Nicholls 7–5, 6–1

== Singles entrants ==
=== Seeds ===
Country	Player	Rank^{1}	Seed
CHN	Zhang Shuai	24	1
	~~Aliaksandra Sasnovich~~	~~30~~	~~2~~
FRA	Alizé Cornet	36	3
ROU	Ana Bogdan	48	4
UKR	Anhelina Kalinina	53	5
ITA	Lucia Bronzetti	58	6
~~GER~~	~~Tatjana Maria~~	~~70~~	~~7~~
UKR	Marta Kostyuk	71	8
	Anna Blinkova	80	9

- ^{1} Rankings as of 5 December 2022.

=== Other entrants ===
The following players received wildcards into the singles main draw:

- (France) Audrey Albié
- (Romania) Ana Bogdan
- (France) Alizé Cornet
- (United States) Sofia Kenin
- ~~Aliaksandra Sasnovich~~
- (China) Zhang Shuai

The following players received entry from the qualifying draw:

- (Croatia) Jana Fett
- Ekaterina Makarova
- (France) Marine Partaud
- Ekaterina Reyngold

The following players received entry as lucky losers:

- (France) Émeline Dartron
- (Chinese Taipei) Joanna Garland
- (France) Jenny Lim

=== Withdrawals ===
Before the tournament

- (Spain) Cristina Bucșa → replaced by (Germany) Anna-Lena Friedsam
- Vitalia Diatchenko → replaced by (France) Carole Monnet
- (France) Léolia Jeanjean → replaced by (France) Clara Burel
- (Germany) Tamara Korpatsch → replaced by (Switzerland) Joanne Züger
- (Germany) Tatjana Maria → replaced by (France) Émeline Dartron
- (United States) Alycia Parks → replaced by (France) Jenny Lim
- (Spain) Nuria Párrizas Díaz → replaced by (Italy) Lucrezia Stefanini
- (France) Diane Parry → replaced by (Belgium) Greet Minnen
- (Belgium) Alison Van Uytvanck → replaced by (United States) Katrina Scott
- (Czech Republic) Markéta Vondroušová → replaced by (Chinese Taipei) Joanna Garland
- (Ukraine) Dayana Yastremska → replaced by (France) Jessika Ponchet
- (Belgium) Maryna Zanevska → replaced by (Denmark) Clara Tauson

== Doubles entrants ==
=== Seeds ===
Country	Player	Country	Player	Rank^{1}	Seed
GEO	Oksana Kalashnikova	UKR	Marta Kostyuk	116	1
GEO	Natela Dzalamidze		Alexandra Panova	118	2

- ^{1} Rankings as of 5 December 2022.

=== Other entrants ===
The following pair received a wildcard into the doubles main draw:

- (France) Elixane Lechemia / (France) Marine Partaud
