= 2023 Open de Limoges – Doubles =

Doubles
- 2023 Open de Limoges

Final
- Champions: (Spain) Cristina Bucșa; Yana Sizikova
- Runners-up: (Georgia (country)) Oksana Kalashnikova (United Kingdom) Maia Lumsden
- Score: 6–4, 6–1

Details
- Draw: 8 (1 WC)
- Seeds: 2

Events
Singles	Doubles
← 2022 ·	Open de Limoges	· 2024 →

Cristina Bucșa and Yana Sizikova won the doubles title at the 2023 Open de Limoges, defeating Oksana Kalashnikova and Maia Lumsden in the final, 6–4, 6–1.

Kalashnikova and Marta Kostyuk were the reigning champions, but Kostyuk did not participate this year.

== Seeds ==
1. (Kazakhstan) Anna Danilina / Alexandra Panova (quarterfinals)
2. (Georgia (country)) Oksana Kalashnikova / (United Kingdom) Maia Lumsden (final)

== Draw ==
=== Key ===
- Q = Qualifier
- WC = Wild card
- LL = Lucky loser
- Alt = Alternate
- SE = Special exempt
- PR = Protected ranking
- ITF = ITF entry
- JE = Junior exempt
- w/o = Walkover
- r = Retired
- d = Defaulted
- SR = Special ranking

=== Draw ===
Quarterfinals
1	(Kazakhstan) A Danilina; A Panova	6	2	[7]
(Czech Republic) A Dețiuc (Netherlands) A Rus	3	6	[10]
(Spain) C Bucșa; Y Sizikova	4	6	[10]
(France) A Hesse (France) K Mladenovic	6	1	[7]
(United Kingdom) O Nicholls (Netherlands) B Schoofs	6	5	[5]
(Georgia (country)) N Dzalamidze (Italy) A Moratelli	4	7	[10]
WC	(France) J Ponchet (Hungary) F Stollár	4	4
2	(Georgia (country)) O Kalashnikova (United Kingdom) M Lumsden	6	6

Semifinals
(Czech Republic) A Dețiuc (Netherlands) A Rus	4	4
(Spain) C Bucșa; Y Sizikova	6	6
(Georgia (country)) N Dzalamidze (Italy) A Moratelli	5	4
2	(Georgia (country)) O Kalashnikova (United Kingdom) M Lumsden	7	6

Final
(Spain) C Bucșa; Y Sizikova	6	6
2	(Georgia (country)) O Kalashnikova (United Kingdom) M Lumsden	4	1
