= 2021 Open de Limoges – Doubles =

Doubles
- 2021 Open de Limoges

Final
- Champions: (Romania) Monica Niculescu (Russia) Vera Zvonareva
- Runners-up: (France) Estelle Cascino (France) Jessika Ponchet
- Score: 6–4, 6–4

Events
Singles	Doubles
← 2019 ·	Open de Limoges	· 2022 →

Georgina García Pérez and Sara Sorribes Tormo were the reigning champions, but chose not to participate.

Monica Niculescu and Vera Zvonareva won the title, defeating Estelle Cascino and Jessika Ponchet in the final, 6–4, 6–4.

== Seeds ==
1. (Romania) Monica Niculescu / (Russia) Vera Zvonareva (champions)
2. (Belgium) Greet Minnen / (Serbia) Nina Stojanović (quarterfinals)

== Draw ==
=== Key ===
- Q = Qualifier
- WC = Wild card
- LL = Lucky loser
- Alt = Alternate
- ITF = ITF entry
- PR = Protected ranking
- SR = Special ranking
- SE = Special exempt
- JE = Junior exempt
- JR = Junior Accelerator Programme entrant
- CO = College Accelerator Programme entrant
- NG = Next Gen Accelerator Program entrant
- w/o = Walkover
- r = Retired
- d = Defaulted

=== Draw ===
Quarterfinals
1	(Romania) M Niculescu (Russia) V Zvonareva	6	6
(India) A Raina (Belgium) K Zimmermann	0	4
(Georgia (country)) O Kalashnikova (Russia) A Panova	5	2
(France) E Jacquemot (United States) R Montgomery	7	6
(Russia) A Blinkova (Russia) V Gracheva	3	7^{7}	[9]
(France) E Cascino (France) J Ponchet	6	6^{4}	[11]
(Chinese Taipei) Y-c Hsieh (France) E Lechemia	3	7	[10]
2	(Belgium) G Minnen (Serbia) N Stojanović	6	5	[4]

Semifinals
1	(Romania) M Niculescu (Russia) V Zvonareva	6	6
(France) E Jacquemot (United States) R Montgomery	3	0
(France) E Cascino (France) J Ponchet	6	6
(Chinese Taipei) Y-c Hsieh (France) E Lechemia	4	3

Final
1	(Romania) M Niculescu (Russia) V Zvonareva	6	6
(France) E Cascino (France) J Ponchet	4	4
