= Monica Niculescu =

Romanian tennis player (born 1987)

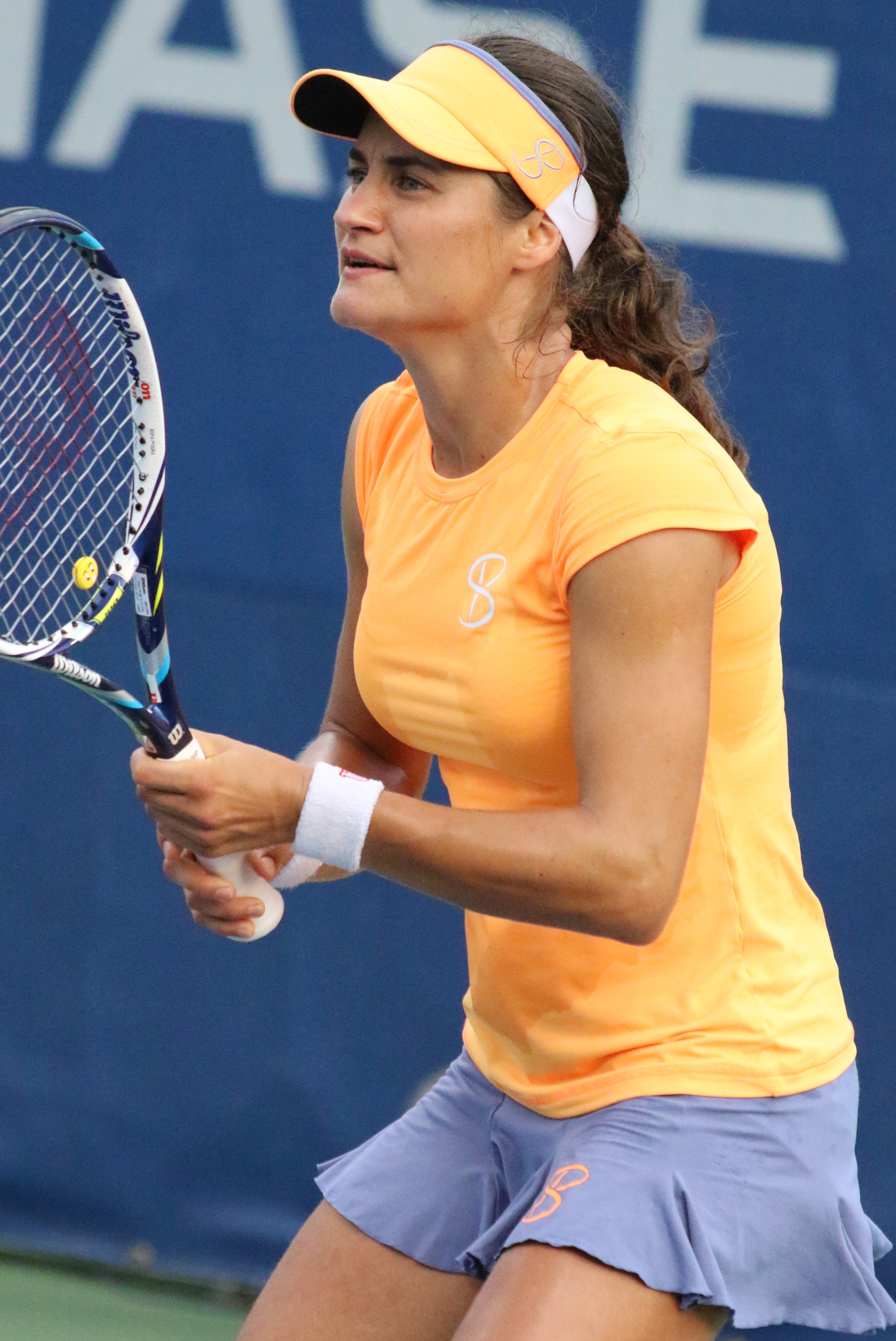
- Niculescu at the 2016 US Open
- Country (sports): Romania
- Residence: Bucharest, Romania
- Born: 25 September 1987 (age 39) Slatina, Romania
- Height: 1.68 m (5 ft 6 in)
- Turned pro: May 2002
- Plays: Right-handed (two-handed backhand)
- Coach: Călin Stelian Ciorbagiu
- Prize money: US$ 7,133,183

Singles
- Career record: 531–367
- Career titles: 3
- Highest ranking: No. 28 (27 February 2012)

Grand Slam singles results
- Australian Open: 3R (2011, 2012, 2014)
- French Open: 2R (2014)
- Wimbledon: 4R (2015)
- US Open: 4R (2011)

Other tournaments
- Olympic Games: 2R (2016)

Doubles
- Career record: 564–364
- Career titles: 12
- Highest ranking: No. 11 (2 April 2018)

Grand Slam doubles results
- Australian Open: SF (2018)
- French Open: QF (2010)
- Wimbledon: F (2017)
- US Open: QF (2021)

Other doubles tournaments
- Olympic Games: 1R (2024)

Team competitions
- Fed Cup: SF (2019); Record 33–23
- Last updated on: 27 October 2025.

Monica Niculescu (born 25 September 1987) is a Romanian professional tennis player. She has been ranked by the WTA as high as No. 28 in singles and No. 11 in doubles. She has won three singles and ten doubles titles on the WTA Tour, one singles and three doubles titles on the WTA Challenger Tour, as well as 19 singles and 22 doubles titles on the ITF Women's Circuit.

She was ranked within the top 30 for several years in singles. Niculescu entered the Grand Slam doubles final at Wimbledon 2017 tournament, together with Chan Hao-ching. She reached the quarterfinals in doubles in all Grand Slam championships. In WTA 1000 (Note: Formerly known as Tier I (until 2009), Premier 5 and Premier Mandatory (until 2021).) tournaments, she got into three finals (doubles), six semifinals (five in doubles), and 12 quarterfinals (11 in doubles). In singles, her best Grand Slam performance is reaching round four, which she did at the 2011 US Open and 2015 Wimbledon Championships.

== Early life ==
Niculescu was born in Slatina but moved to Bucharest when she was age four. Her mother Cristiana Silvia is a pharmaceutical sales representative, and her father Mihai Niculescu is an engineer. She has an older sister, Gabriela, who has also been a professional tennis player.

== Junior career ==
Before age 18, Niculescu had won 11 singles finals in the ITF Junior Circuit, losing only one set:

- Bucharest (Aug 2002), 6–1, 7–6 against Tsvetana Pironkova
- Cavtat]] (Apr 2003) 6–4, 6–1 against Darija Jurak
- Timişoara (Aug 2003) 6–2, 6–3 against Veronika Rizhik
- Albufeira (Feb 2004) 6–1, 3–6, 6–0 against Irina Kotkina
- Portimão (Feb 2004) 6–4, 7–6 against Nadja Pavić
- Bucharest (May 2004) 6–2, 6–2 against Simona Matei
- Iași (Aug 2004) 7–6, 6–0 against Raluca Olaru
- Cairo (Mar 2005) 6–4, 6–2 against Galina Fokina
- Ain Alsoukhna (Mar 2005) 6–3, 6–4 against Magdaléna Rybáriková
- Antalya (May 2005) 6–2, 6–2 against Ekaterina Dzehalevich
- Coimbra (Aug 2005) 6–3, 6–1 against Aravane Rezaï.

She also won eight out of fourteen doubles events, most of them paired with her sister, Gabriela Niculescu. She reached the finals in girls' doubles at the French Open in 2004, paired with Mădălina Gojnea, and twice in Wimbledon in 2004 and 2005, paired with Marina Erakovic.

== Professional ==
=== 2007–08: First WTA doubles final, top 50 in the world ===
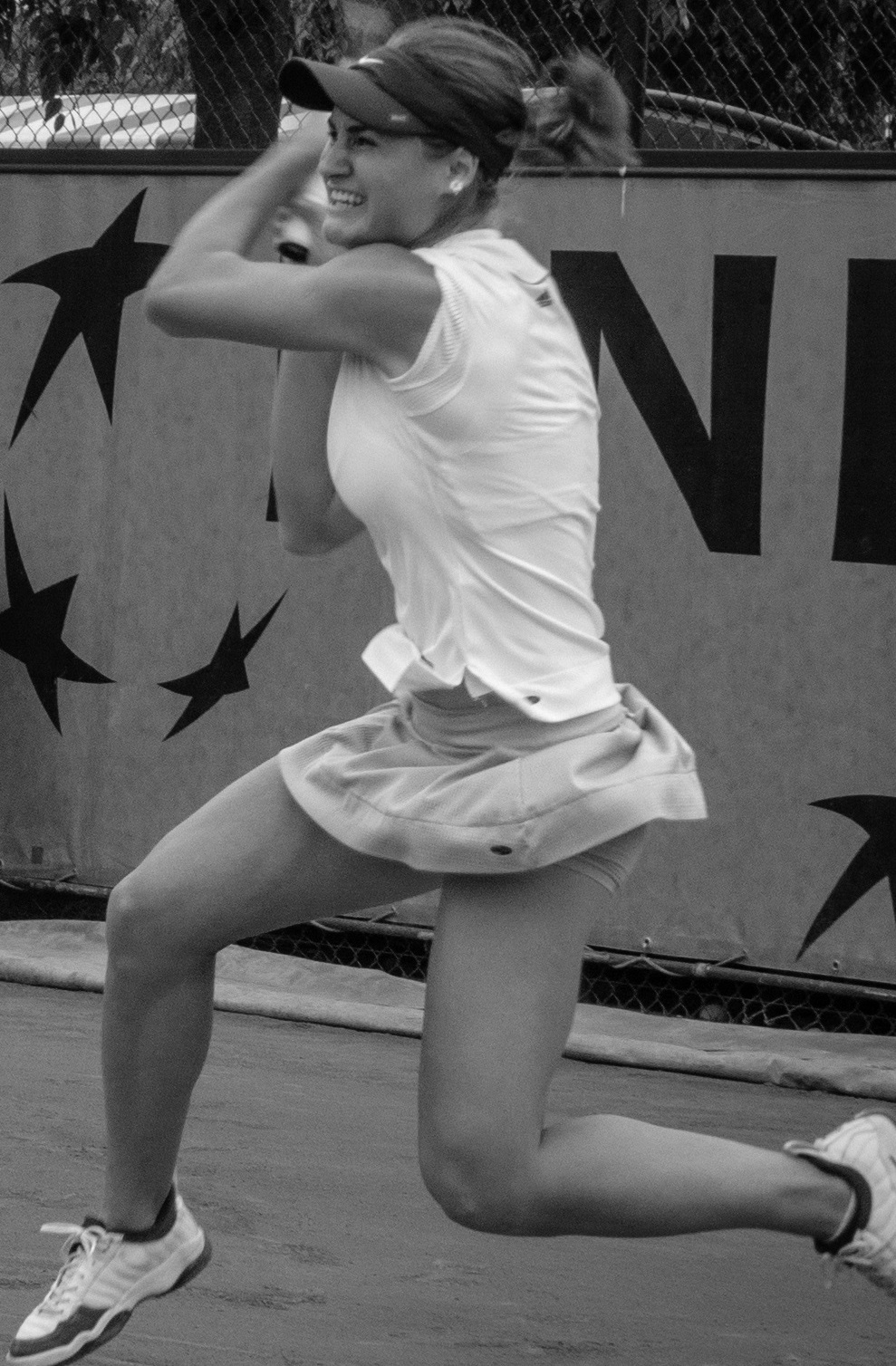
Niculescu at the 2008 French Open

Niculescu had her first WTA Tour debuting attempt in May 2006 at the Istanbul Cup but lost in qualifying. In February of the following year, she made her WTA Tour main-draw debut at the Dubai Tennis Championships. In June 2007, she played her first doubles event at the Barcelona Open. There, she also recorded her first win in doubles at the WTA Tour. A month later, she managed to get to her first WTA event semifinal, at the Gastein Ladies in the doubles event. During the year, she also attempted to make her major debut but lost in the qualifyings of all four. She finished the year 2007 in the top 200.

In 2008 at the Australian Open, she played her first Grand Slam main draw as a qualifier. A month later, at the Qatar Open, she made her Tier I debut and also recorded her first win on the WTA Tour in a singles event. She continued making debuts at the French Open, Wimbledon and US Open, at Tier I events such as the Italian Open and Canadian Open. In doubles events, she managed to get to her first WTA final at the Connecticut Open alongside compatriot Sorana Cîrstea, but they failed to win the trophy. Niculescu finished the year inside the top 50 in both singles and doubles. In singles, she was ranked world No. 48, and second in Romania, at the end of 2008.

=== 2009: First WTA Tour doubles title ===
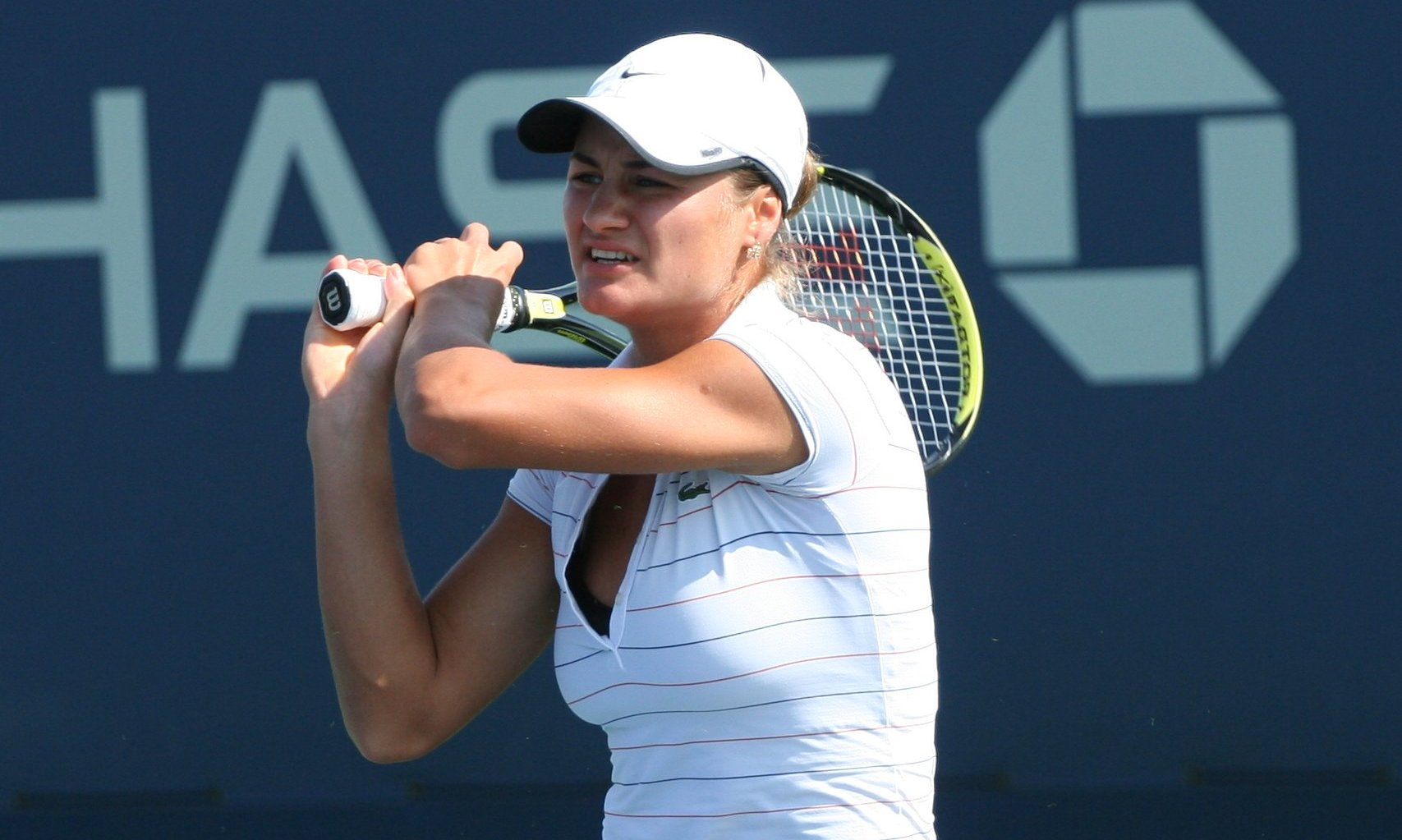
Niculescu at the 2009 US Open

Despite progress in previous seasons, the opening of the season was not promising for Niculescu. In May 2009, she reached her first singles quarterfinal at the Internationaux de Strasbourg. In the quarterfinal match, she lost to Aravane Rezaï. In her next quarterfinal appearance four months later, at the Tashkent Open, she advanced to the quarterfinal, then lost to Yaroslava Shvedova. Niculescu fell outside the top 100 at the end of the year, ranked 103.

In doubles, in February alongside Cîrstea, she reached semifinals of the Premier Open GdF Suez but then withdrew. She reached two back-to-back Premier 5/Mandatory quarterfinals at the Dubai Tennis Championships and the Indian Wells Open. Niculescu then had two consecutive Grand Slam third rounds - French Open and Wimbledon. She then won a WTA Tour doubles title, at the Budapest Grand Prix, winning alongside Alisa Kleybanova. Three weeks later, she advanced to another final at the Stanford Classic but failed to win. Soon after, she reached her first Premier 5/Premier Mandatory semifinal at the Cincinnati Open alongside Akgul Amanmuradova. By the end of the year, she reached the third round of the US Open and semifinals of the International-level Tashkent Open and Premier-level Kremlin Cup. She finished 2009 as world No. 30.

=== 2010: First major QF in doubles ===
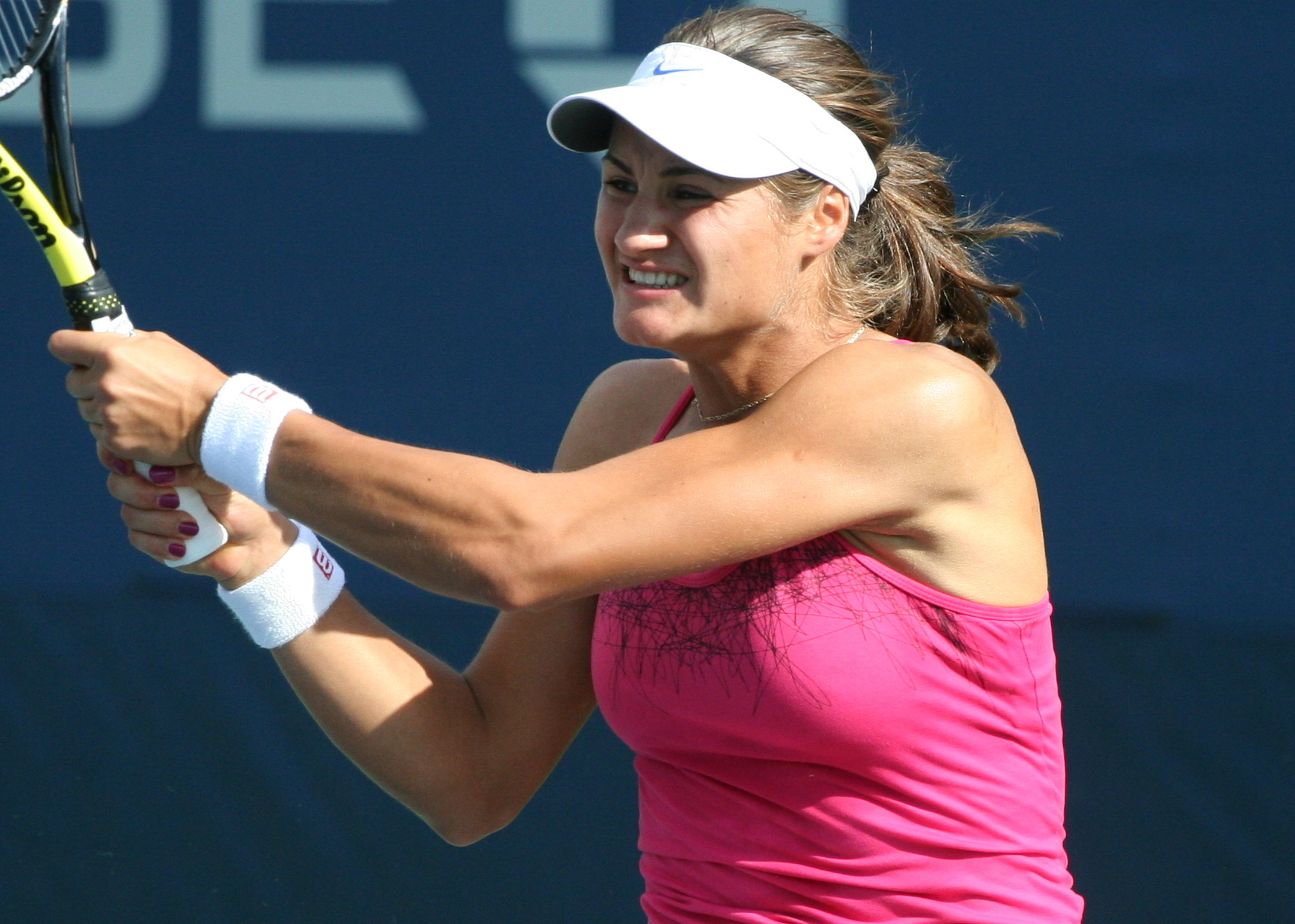
Niculescu at the 2010 US Open

In late September, when she reached the semifinals at the Tashkent Open. She beat fellow Romanian and top-30 player, Alexandra Dulgheru, then lost her semifinal match to Elena Vesnina. During the year, she recorded only one major match win at Wimbledon, defeating Gisela Dulko in the first round. At the Premier 5/Premier Mandatory-level, she also scored only one win. It came at the Cincinnati Open, where she defeated Sabine Lisicki. Niculescu returned to the top 100 in August and stayed there for the rest of the season.

Niculescu reached the final of the Hobart International. At the French Open, she reached her first career Grand Slam quarterfinal. In July, she played another final at the Prague Open but finished runner-up. The following week, she won the title at the $100K Pétange tournament. Niculescu advanced to the quarterfinals of the Canadian Open, followed by a semifinal at the Cincinnati Open and a third round at the US Open.

=== 2011: Singles breakthrough, top 30 ===
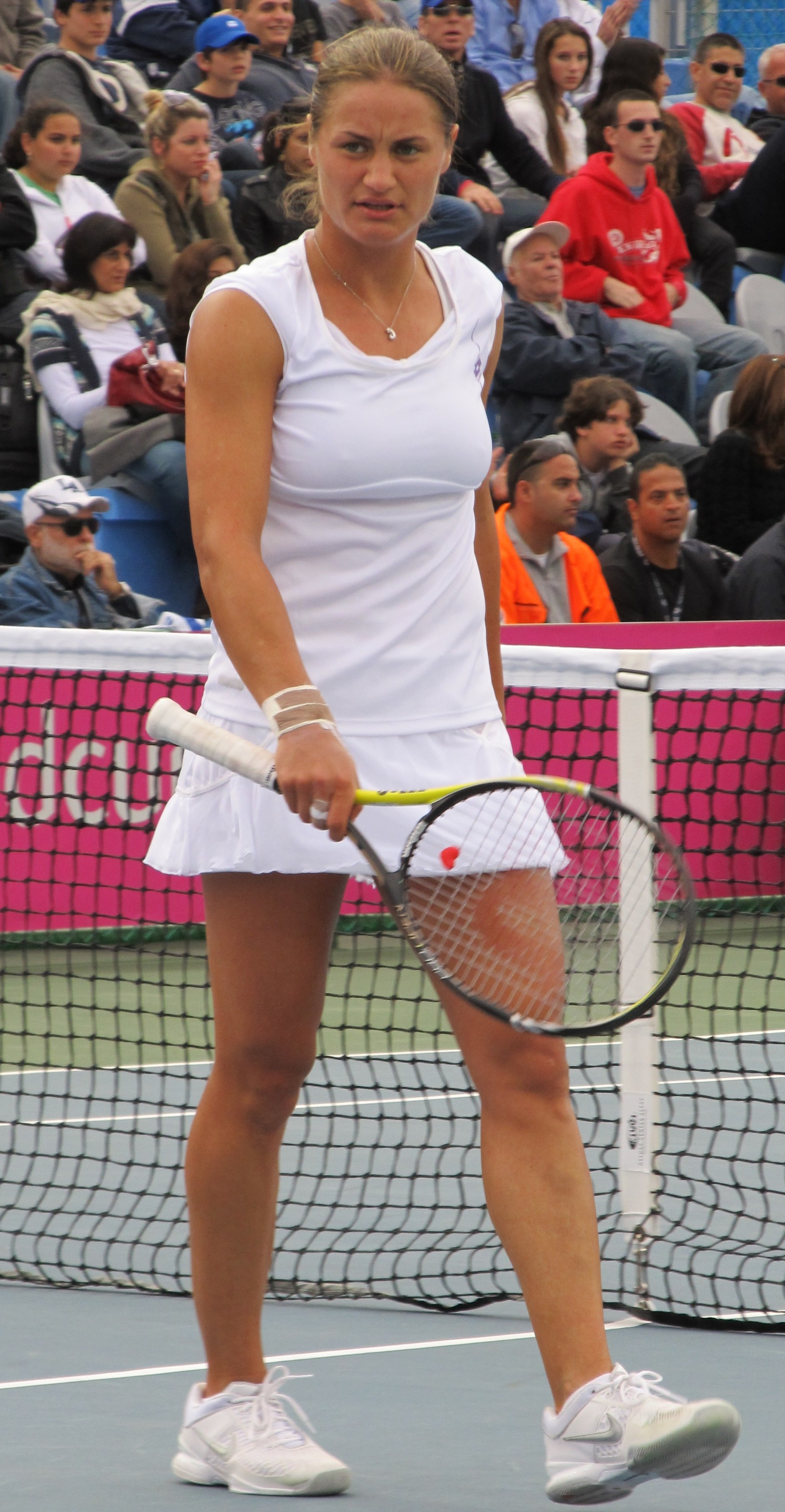
Niculescu at the 2011 Fed Cup

At the Australian Open, Niculescu advanced to her first Grand Slam third round in singles. In the first round, she defeated top-50 player, Timea Bacsinszky, in straight sets. She then played against Tsvetana Pironkova, the 32nd seed; Niculescu lost five games. In the third round, she lost to the Grand Slam champion and top 10 Francesca Schiavone. In April, she reached her first semifinal of the year at the Estoril Open. She lost her semifinal match to Anabel Medina Garrigues.

At the 2011 US Open, after making three wins, she reached a Grand Slam round of 16 for the first time. Niculescu defeated Patricia Mayr-Achleitner in straight sets in the first round; in the second, top 50 Dulgheru won three games; and in the third round, she lost one game to top 30 Lucie Šafářová. She failed to reach her first singles Grand Slam quarterfinal after losing to Angelique Kerber in the straight-sets.

At the China Open, she first defeated top-10 player Li Na. She then defeated top 50 Chanelle Scheepers, losing three games. In both the third round and the quarterfinal, she made a turnover after losing the first set. In the semifinal, she faced No. 11 Andrea Petkovic but won only two games. Niculescu then finished the year with another WTA final, at the Luxembourg Open, but finished as a runner-up. In the final, she lost to No. 3 Victoria Azarenka. Right after that, she made her debut inside the top 30, finishing the year as No. 30 and No. 1 Romanian player.

She reached the semifinal of the Brisbane International in the first week of the year. Niculescu got to another semifinal in early April at the Andalucia Tennis Experience. Her best Grand Slam result of the year was the third round of the French Open. She reached only one WTA final, at the Baku Cup in July 2011.

=== 2012–14: First WTA Tour singles title, second doubles major QF ===
==== Singles ====
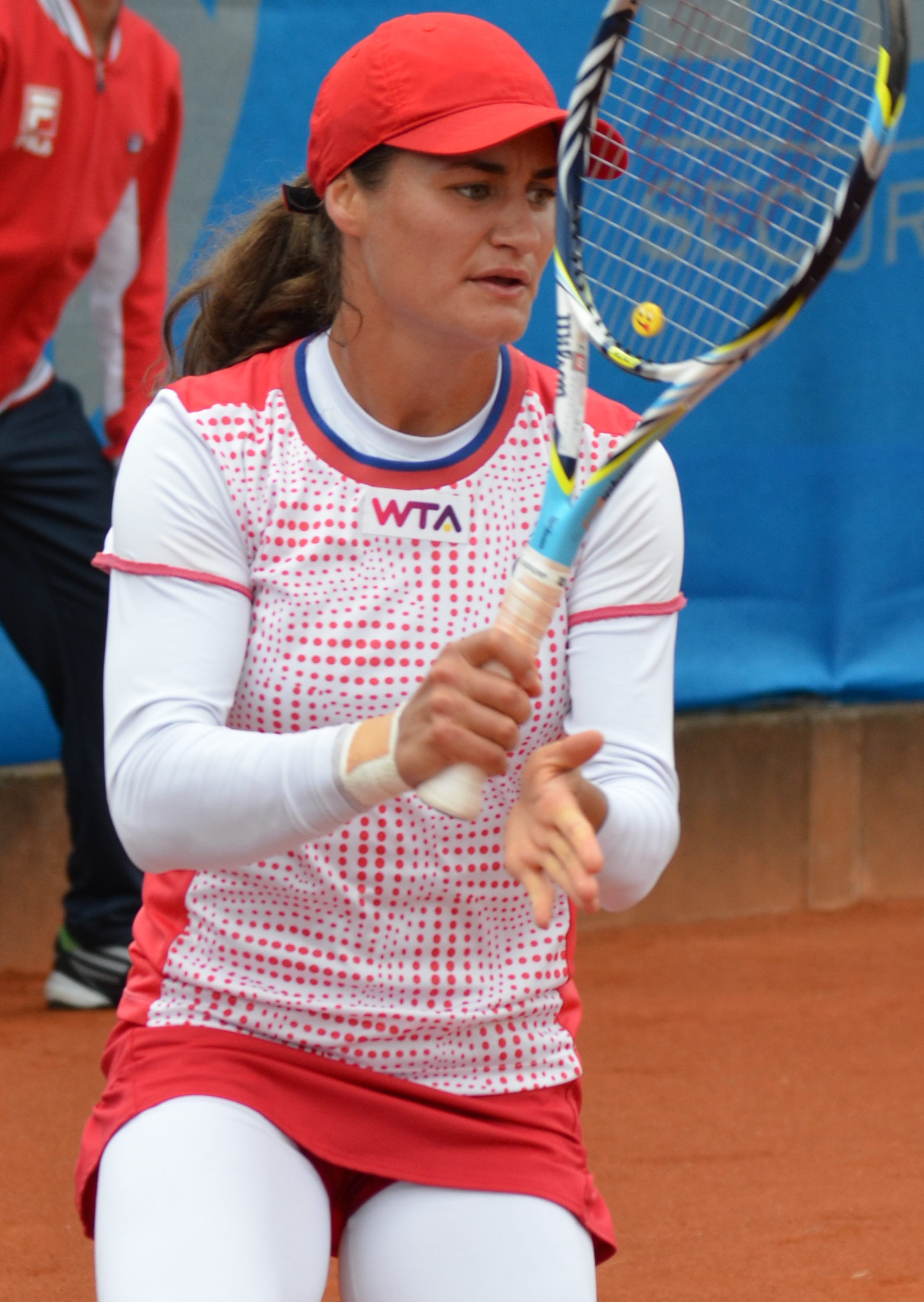
Niculescu at the 2014 Nürnberger Versicherungscup

In February 2012, she reached the quarterfinal of the Qatar Open in singles event. In the second-round she defeated top 10 Vera Zvonareva. It was the second career top-10 win for Niculescu. Until October 2012, she was losing in the early round at all tournaments. She then jumped to the final of the Luxembourg Open for the second year in a row after making four consecutive straight-sets wins. She still did not win her first WTA singles title, losing to Venus Williams in the final match. The next two weeks, she played at the ITF Circuit as her last two singles tournaments of the year. First week, she reached the semifinal of the $100k Poitiers tournament, followed with the title at the $50k+H Open Nantes. In the final, she defeated Yulia Putintseva.

Niculescu started the 2013 season with the semifinal of the Shenzhen Open. Right after that, she came to Australia to play at the Hobart International, where she advanced to the quarterfinals. In early March, she won her first WTA singles title at the Brasil Tennis Cup in Florianópolis, after defeating Olga Puchkova in the final. A month later, she got to another semifinal at the Monterrey Open. By the end of the year, she reached one WTA Tour quarterfinal at the Washington Open. In 2013, she suffered first-round losses in all Grand Slam tournaments.

Niculescu started the year with two back-to-back quarterfinals of the Shenzhen Open and Hobart International. At the Australian Open, she reached the third round, after defeating No. 15 Lisicki in the three sets. It was first singles Grand Slam win for Niculescu, after making 7 consecutive Grand Slam first round losses. In July, she reached the semifinal of the Bucharest Open but lost to her compatriot and No. 3 Simona Halep. In September, she won her second career singles title at the Guangzhou Open. Niculescu won all matches in straight sets, defeating No. 22 Alizé Cornet in the final.

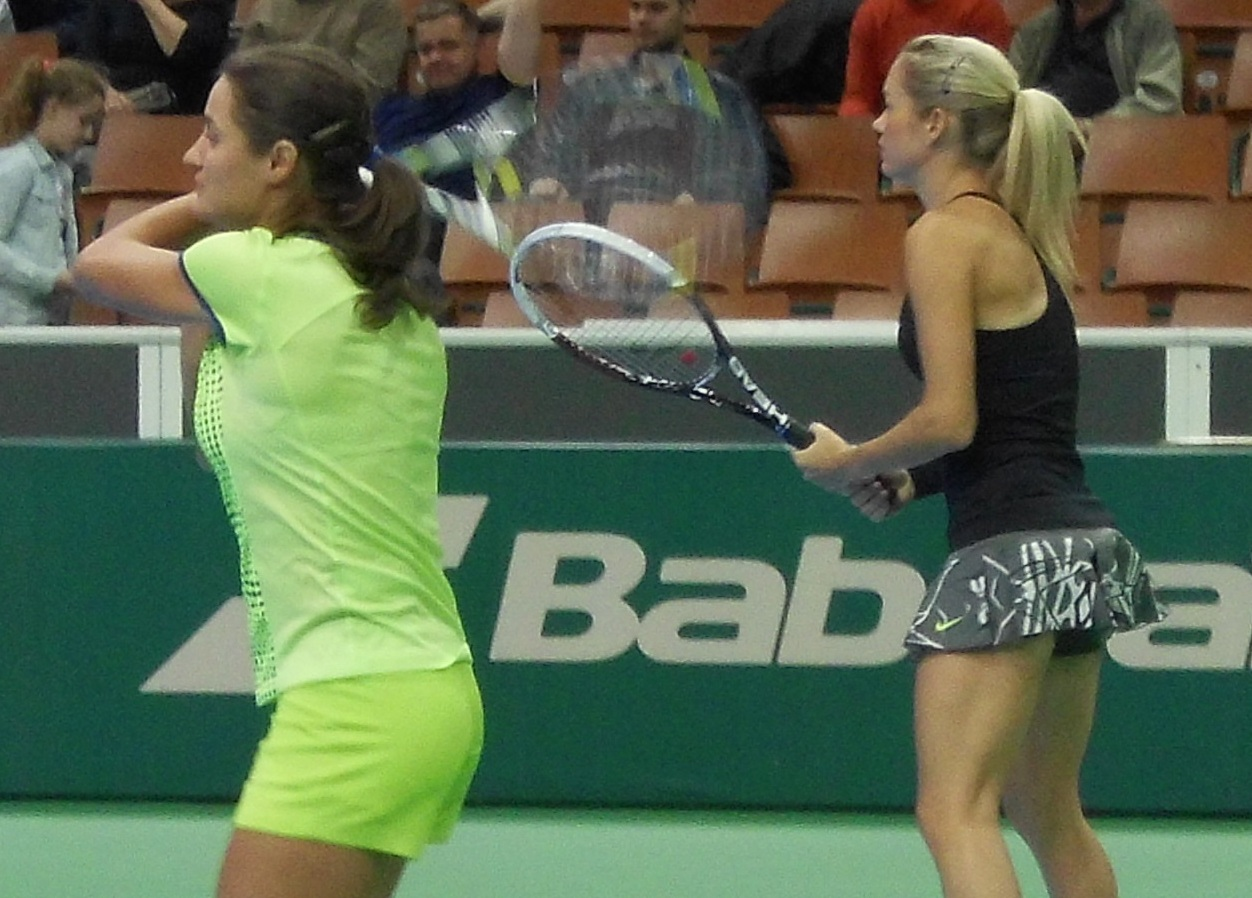
Niculescu alongside Koukalová (right) at the Katowice Open, where they finished runners-up

==== Doubles ====
In January 2012 she achieved a winning title at the Hobart International. The following week, she reached her second career Grand Slam quarterfinal in doubles at the Australian Open. In March 2012, she reached the semifinal of the Premier Mandatory Miami Open. It was her first at least quarterfinal of the Premier 5/Premier Mandatory tournaments after winning semifinal at the 2010 Canadian Open. In September 2012, she got to the final of the Guangzhou Open but finished runner-up. A month later, she finished again runner-up, this time at the Luxembourg Open.

In the first half of the 2013, she finished as a quarterfinalist at the Italian Open. She achieved at least one quarterfinal on both surfaces (hardcourt and clay) at the Premier 5/Premier Mandatory tournaments. It was also her eighth Premier 5/Premier Mandatory at least quarterfinal. In June, she reached the final of the Eastbourne International. Despite losing in the final match, she had accomplished at least one final on all three surfaces (hard, clay and grass).

Niculescu started the 2014 season with two back-to-back titles at the Shenzhen Open and Hobart International. At the Qatar Open, she reached her ninth Premier 5/Premier Mandatory quarterfinal. In April, she advanced to another WTA final at the Katowice Open but failed to win the trophy. During the year, she also reached two Premier semifinals, at the Open GdF Suez in late January and at the Connecticut Open in August.

=== 2015: First Premier 5 final in doubles ===
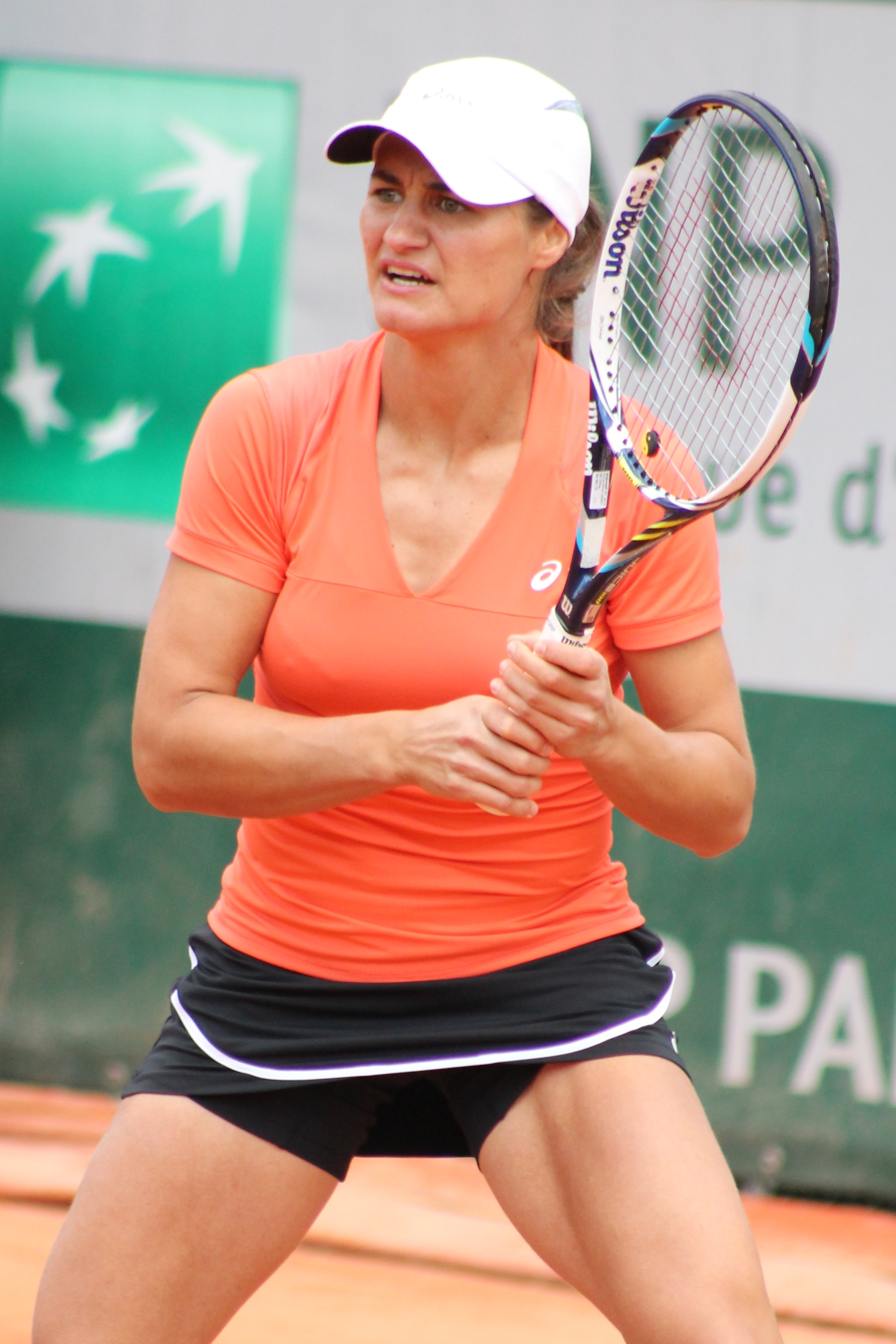
Niculescu at the 2015 French Open

First half of the year was difficult for Niculescu as she drew world No. 1, Serena Williams, twice in a row in the second round of Indian Wells and Miami. While she managed to test Williams in Indian Wells with a 5–7, 5–7 score, she was not able to win a set against her in either match. At the French Open, she faced No. 8, Carla Suárez Navarro, in the opening round. She lost the match after winning four games. She won the title at the $100k Marseille tournament in early June. She then returned to the WTA Tour, where she got to the final in the Nottingham Open by defeating No. 13, Agnieszka Radwańska. In the final, she lost to Ana Konjuh in three sets. At Wimbledon, she reached the round of 16 and lost to No. 15, Bacsinszky. She played in the semifinals of the Bucharest Open, and followed this up with the quarterfinals of the Washington Open. In late September, she advanced to her last quarterfinal of the year at the Guangzhou Open.

In January, at the Hobart International, she reached the final. A month later, she reached the quarterfinal of the Premier 5 Dubai Championships. Soon after, she achieved another Premier 5/Premier Mandatory quarterfinal at the Miami Open. In early October, she went further. At the Wuhan Open, she advanced to the final as her first Premier 5/Premier Mandatory final. Alongside fellow Romanian Irina-Camelia Begu, they ended runners-up, losing the final to Martina Hingis and Sania Mirza. She finished the year with the final of the Premier-level Kremlin Cup and the title at the $100k Poitiers tournament.

=== 2016: Top 20 in doubles, Olympics debut ===
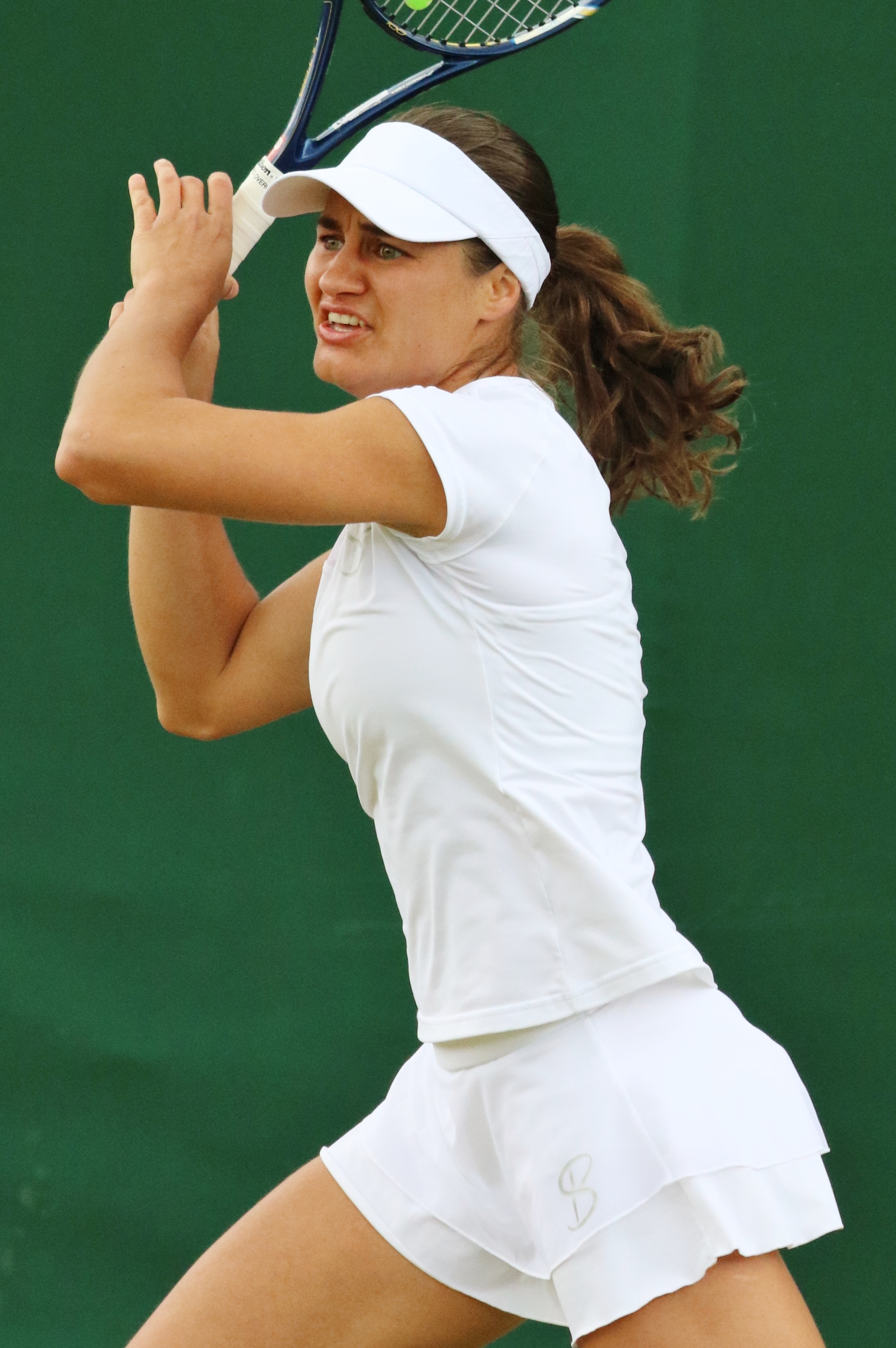
Niculescu at the 2016 Wimbledon Championships

Niculescu started the year with the title at the Shenzhen Open in doubles event. Despite reaching only the third round, she beat No. 31 Lisicki in the first round, followed up then with a win over former No. 1 Jelena Janković. In the third round, she faced No. 3 Radwańska. She lost the match in the straight-sets. At the Miami Open, she was the 32nd seed in singles, so she omitted the first round and had a lower ranked player in the next round. In the third round, she faced top 40 CoCo Vandeweghe, losing five games. Despite losing to No. 23 Johanna Konta in the fourth round, it was her first Premier 5/Premier Mandatory in that stage of competition since the 2012 Qatar Open. In doubles, she reached the semifinal as her 12th Premier 5/Premier Mandatory quarterfinal and fourth semifinal. In doubles, she reached another semifinal from the same category at the Italian Open.

In late July, she won her sixth doubles WTA title at the Washington Open. A week later, she won in another final, this time at the Premier 5 Canadian Open. For the second time in her career, she failed to win title from the mentioned category. On the first next ranking, she reached a to date the highest doubles ranking of 16th place. She then made her debut at the Olympics Games. In singles, she advanced to the second round after defeating Verónica Cepede Royg but was then forced to withdraw due to injury. In doubles, she lost in the first round. For her American Tour, she started with the quarterfinal of the Cincinnati Open. Alongside Mirza, she then won title at the Connecticut Open as her 7th career doubles title and first from the Premier category. After not winning any quarterfinal in singles since the beginning of the year, she made progress at the Korea Open. In the first fourth rounds, she won all matches in the straight-sets. In the final, she lost to Lara Arrubarrena after three sets. A month later, she won her third career singles WTA title at the Luxembourg Open after beating Petra Kvitová. There, she also reached the final in doubles.

=== 2017–18: Wimbledon F and Australian Open SF in doubles, No. 11 in doubles ===
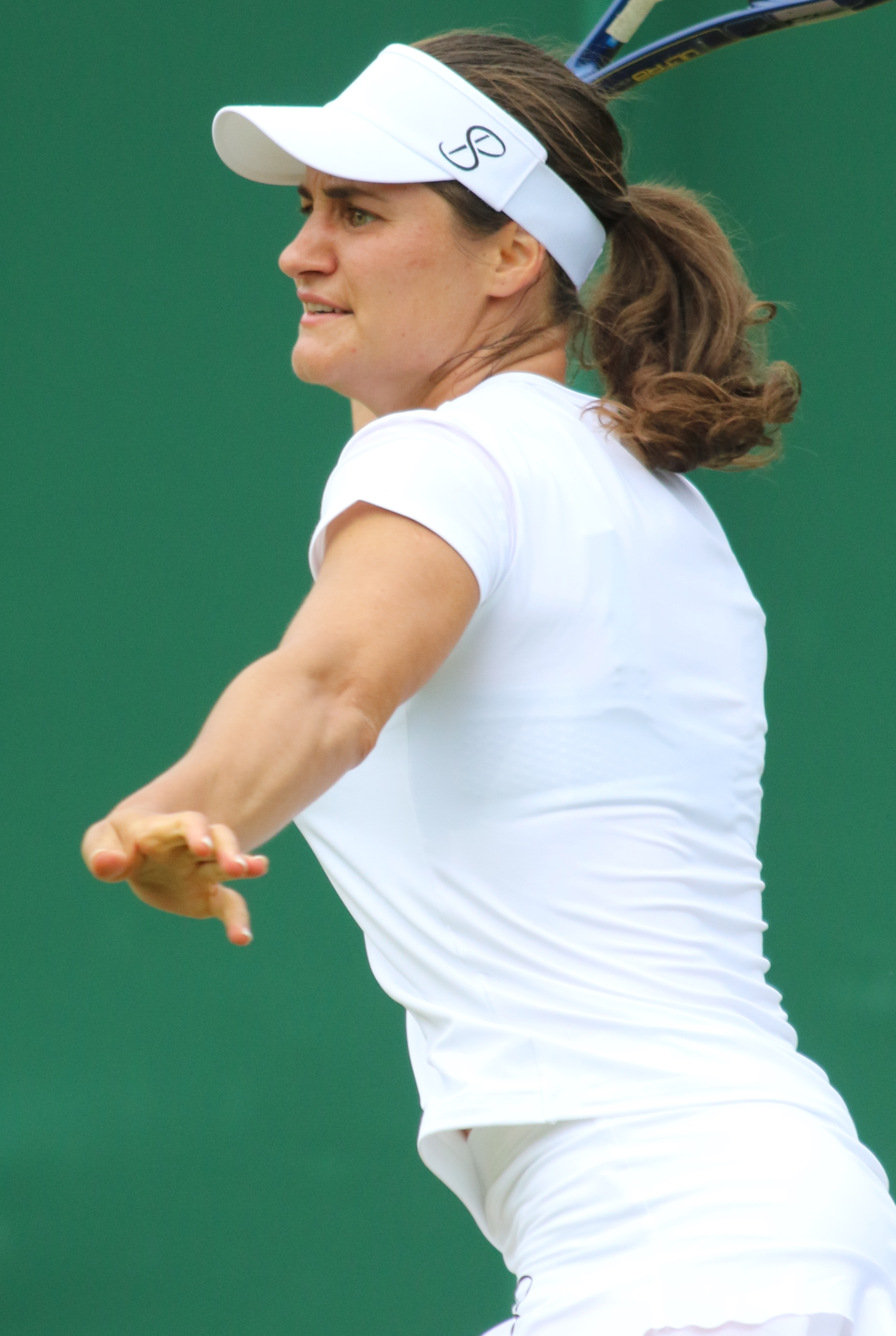
Niculescu at the 2017 Wimbledon Championships when she reached her first Grand Slam doubles final

At the 2017 Hobart International, she made it to the final and lost to Elise Mertens in straight sets. In April, she won the doubles event at the Ladies Open Biel-Bienne alongside Hsieh Su-wei. At Wimbledon, alongside Chan Hao-ching, she finished as a runner-up after losing to Ekaterina Makarova and Vesnina. In August, she advanced to the quarterfinal of the Citi Open in Washington, but then lost to Julia Görges. At the Cincinnati Open, she reached the semifinal in doubles event alongside Hsieh; they lost to Hingis-Latisha Chan. At the US Open, she reached the third round, where she lost to Jennifer Brady. She won the WTA 125 event at Limoges, on 12 November.

Her 2018 season started with playing at the Hobart International; she advanced to the quarterfinals after two wins but was then forced to withdraw. Despite losing in the first round of the singles event at the Australian Open, she managed to reach semifinals in doubles, partnering with Begu. Next, she advanced to another quarterfinal at the Taiwan Open, but lost to Lisicki, in three sets. At the WTA 1000 Qatar Open she beat Maria Sharapova in the first round, followed up with a win over Magdaléna Rybáriková. In the following round, she lost to Caroline Wozniacki. A month later, she reached another WTA 1000 third round, this time at the Miami Open. In the third round, she was forced to retire during the third set against Sloane Stephens due to injury. She played in the first round of Wimbledon, Canadian Open, US Open and Wuhan Open. On the 2 April 2018, she reached a career-high doubles ranking of 11.

=== 2019–21: Drop in singles rankings, completed doubles major quarterfinals ===
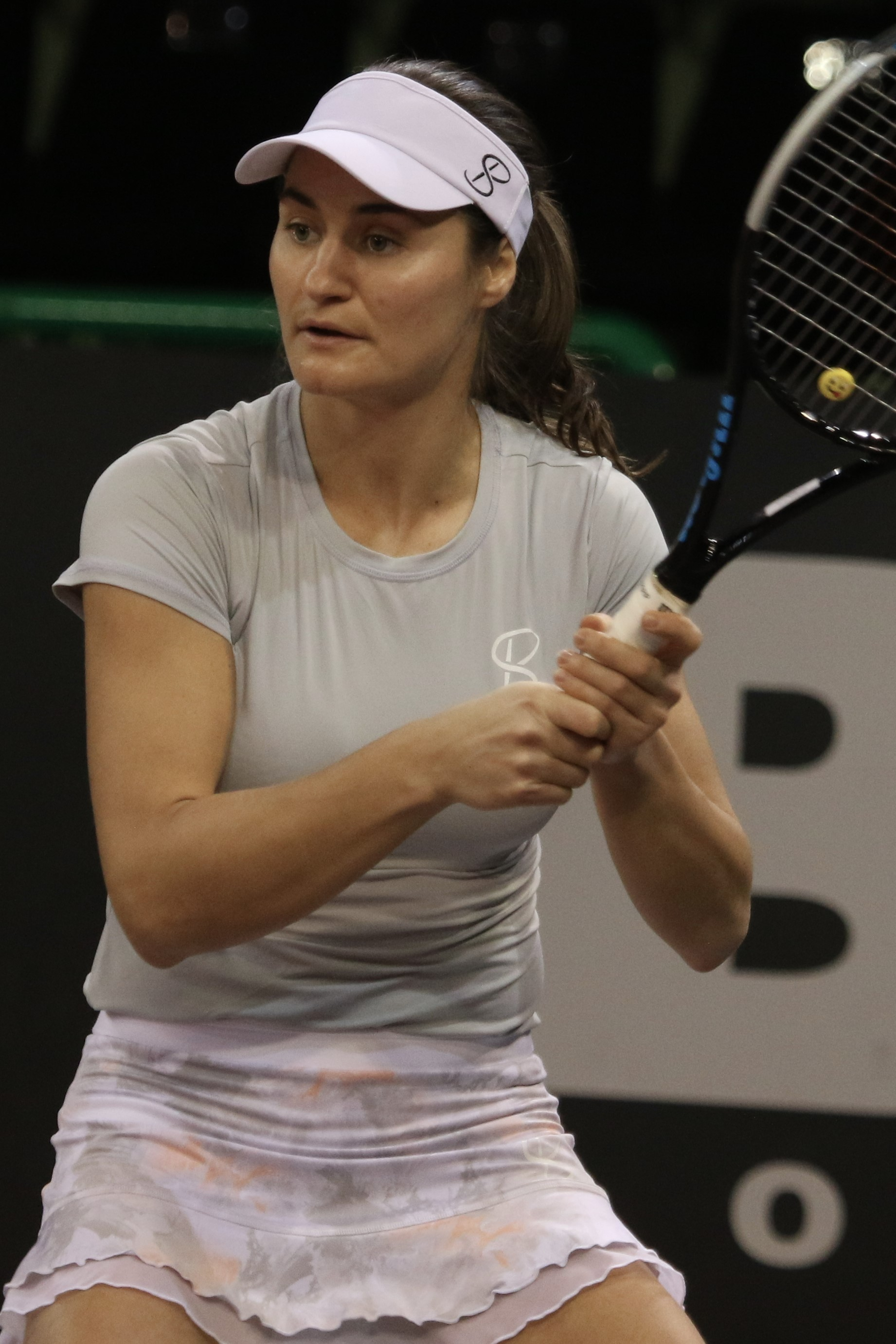
Niculescu at the 2021 Open de Limoges

Niculescu started 2019 by reaching the quarterfinals of the Shenzhen Open but lost to Wang Yafan. The following week, she reached the semifinals of the Hobart International in the doubles event. In the Australian Open, she lost in the first round in singles but got to the third round in doubles. At the Thailand Open, she and Begu won a title in the doubles category. At the Miami Open, she got to the third round after defeating Garbiñe Muguruza, but then lost to Wozniacki. In doubles, she and Abigail Spears reached the quarterfinals. They lost in the quarterfinal match against Samantha Stosur and Zhang Shuai after three sets.

In the grass-court season, she reached the semifinal of the Nottingham Open doubles event. The following week, she won the $100k Ilkley Trophy grass-court tournament, defeating Tímea Babos in the final. Her next tournament was Wimbledon, where she defeated former top 10 player Petkovic. In doubles, she advanced to the third round. A month later, she and Margarita Gasparyan lost in the final of the Bronx Open.

At the 2020 Australian Open, Niculescu qualified into the main draw, facing Alizé Cornet in the first round. After winning the first set, she won one game in the second set, and got defeated in the third. At the Prague Open, Niculescu finished runner-up alongside Olaru losing to Lucie Hradecká and Kristýna Plíšková. At the US Open, she lost to Danielle Collins in the first round.

At the 2021 Qatar Open doubles event, she and Jeļena Ostapenko finished runners-up, losing the final to Nicole Melichar and Demi Schuurs. Soon later, she reached the semifinal of the St. Petersburg Ladies' Trophy alongside Lesley Pattinama Kerkhove. At the French Open, she and Ostapenko got into the fourth round, where the Pliskova's sisters defeated them. Next, she won the ITF title at the $100k Nottingham Trophy, where, together with Elena-Gabriela Ruse, she defeated Priscilla Hon and Storm Sanders. After that she went to Wimbledon, where she lost to Aryna Sabalenka. In doubles, she got one round further together with Andreea Mitu.

At the Tokyo Olympics, Niculescu started only in the doubles event. Playing with Olaru, she got to the second round after beating former No. 5 Chan Hao-ching, and former No. 1 Latisha Chan. Niculescu got to the quarterfinals of the US Open alongside compatriot Elena-Gabriela Ruse, this being her first Grand Slam quarterfinal since the 2018 Australian Open and the first one at the US Open. This completed her career doubles Grand Slam quarterfinals, by reaching at least the quarterfinals at each of the majors.

In October, Niculescu won the inaugural Astana Open together with Anna-Lena Friedsam. This was her tenth WTA Tour doubles title, and the first since February 2019. She ended the season with the doubles title at the WTA 125 Open de Limoges, alongside Vera Zvonareva.

=== 2024: Paris Summer Olympics and Monterrey Open doubles title ===
Partnering Irina-Camelia Begu, Niculescu represented Romania at the Paris Olympics, losing in the first round to Taiwanese pairing Hsieh Su-wei and Tsao Chia-yi. Alongside Elena-Gabriela Ruse, she won the doubles at the Hong Kong 125 Open in October, defeating Nao Hibino and Makoto Ninomiya in the final.

Niculescu won the Monterrey Open doubles title with Guo Hanyu, after beating Giuliana Olmos and Alexandra Panova in the match tiebreaker. Alongside Elena-Gabriela Ruse, she won the doubles at the Hong Kong 125 Open in October, defeating Nao Hibino and Makoto Ninomiya in the final. Partnering Elena-Gabriela Ruse, Niculescu won the doubles title at the WTA 125 Open Angers Arena Loire, defeating Belinda Bencic and Celine Naef in the final.

=== 2025: Hobart doubles final ===
Partnering with Fanny Stollár, Niculescu reached the doubles final at the Hobart International, losing to Jiang Xinyu and Wu Fang-hsien.

== Playing style ==
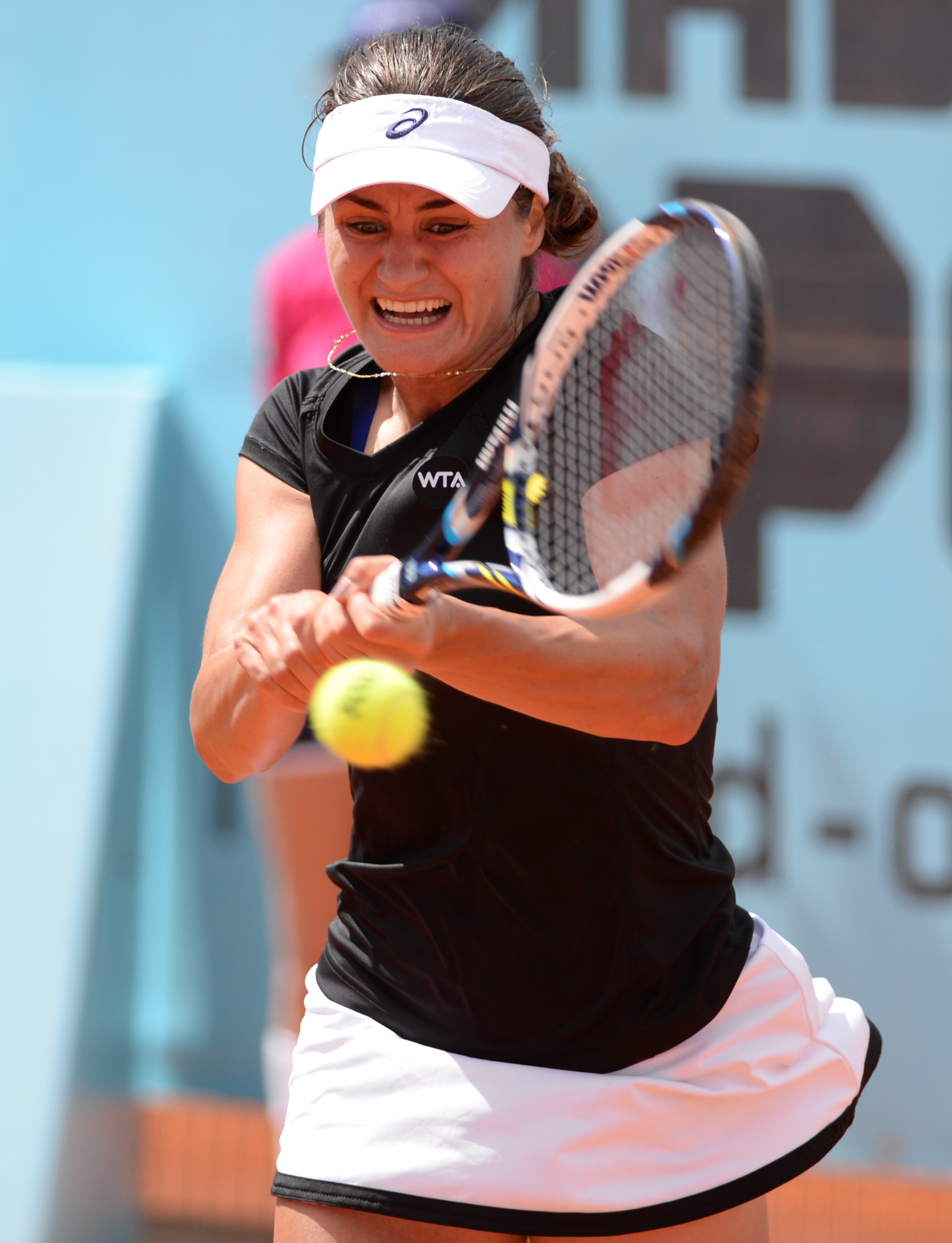
Niculescu preparing to hit a backhand

Niculescu is a right-handed player, known for her unorthodox style of play. Her trademark is an unpredictable forehand slice. She enjoys hitting a flat, two-handed backhand. She is able to force tricky drop shots and precise volleys. During her match against Johanna Konta at the 2017 China Open, Niculescu showed a variety of spins.

Niculescu cited Martina Hingis and Andre Agassi as her tennis idols. Her opponents have not always enjoyed playing against her, since her playing style is opposite to what most players do. For instance, she hits a slice forehand, but she hits a topspin backhand. One tactic Niculescu uses to break through her opponent's defence is to force her opponent to run more by using her footwork.

== Coaches ==
She is currently coached by Călin Stelian Ciorbagiu.

== Career statistics ==
=== Grand Slam performance timelines ===
Key
W	F	SF	QF	#R	RR	Q#	P#	DNQ	A	Z#	PO	G	S	B	NMS	NTI	P	NH

(W) winner; (F) finalist; (SF) semifinalist; (QF) quarterfinalist; (#R) rounds 4, 3, 2, 1; (RR) round-robin stage; (Q#) qualification round; (P#) preliminary round; (DNQ) did not qualify; (A) absent; (Z#) Davis/Fed Cup Zonal Group (with number indication) or (PO) play-off; (G) gold, (S) silver or (B) bronze Olympic/Paralympic medal; (NMS) not a Masters tournament; (NTI) not a Tier I tournament; (P) postponed; (NH) not held; (SR) strike rate (events won / competed); (W–L) win–loss record.
To avoid confusion and double counting, these charts are updated at the conclusion of a tournament or when the player's participation has ended.

==== Singles ====
Tournament	2008	2009	2010	2011	2012	2013	2014	2015	2016	2017	2018	2019	2020	2021	2022	SR	W–L	Win %
Australian Open	1R	2R	1R	3R	3R	1R	3R	1R	2R	1R	1R	1R	1R	Q1	A	0 / 13	8–13	38%
French Open	1R	1R	Q3	1R	1R	1R	2R	1R	1R	1R	A	A	1R	Q3	A	0 / 10	1–10	9%
Wimbledon	2R	1R	2R	2R	1R	1R	1R	4R	2R	1R	1R	2R	NH	1R	A	0 / 13	8–13	38%
US Open	1R	1R	1R	4R	1R	1R	2R	2R	3R	3R	1R	1R	A	Q3	A	0 / 12	9–12	43%
Win–loss	1–4	1–4	1–3	6–4	2–4	0–4	4–4	4–4	4–4	2–4	0–3	1–3	0–2	0–1	0–0	0 / 48	26–48	35%

==== Doubles ====
Tournament	2008	2009	2010	2011	2012	2013	2014	2015	2016	2017	2018	2019	2020	2021	2022	SR	W–L	Win%
Australian Open	A	2R	3R	2R	QF	3R	2R	2R	1R	1R	SF	3R	3R	1R	A	0 / 13	19–13	59%
French Open	2R	3R	QF	3R	2R	3R	2R	1R	A	A	A	A	2R	3R	2R	0 / 11	16–11	59%
Wimbledon	2R	3R	2R	2R	2R	1R	2R	2R	1R	F	3R	3R	NH	2R	1R	0 / 14	18–14	56%
US Open	2R	3R	3R	1R	1R	1R	2R	2R	3R	3R	2R	1R	A	QF	1R	0 / 14	15–14	52%
Win–loss	3–3	7–4	8–4	4–4	5–4	4–4	4–4	3–4	2–3	7–3	7–3	4–3	3–2	6–4	1–3	0 / 52	68–52	57%

=== Grand Slam tournament finals ===
==== Doubles: 1 (runner-up) ====
Result	Year	Tournament	Surface	Partner	Opponents	Score
Loss	2017	Wimbledon	Grass	(Chinese Taipei) Chan Hao-ching	(Russia) Ekaterina Makarova (Russia) Elena Vesnina	0–6, 0–6
