= 2024 Open de Limoges – Doubles =

Doubles
- 2024 Open de Limoges

Final
- Champions: (France) Elsa Jacquemot (France) Margaux Rouvroy
- Runners-up: Erika Andreeva (France) Séléna Janicijevic
- Score: 6–4, 6–3

Details
- Draw: 8 (1 WC)
- Seeds: 2

Events
Singles	Doubles
- Open de Limoges

Cristina Bucșa and Yana Sizikova were the reigning champions, but Bucșa did not participate this year. Sizikova partnered Ekaterina Alexandrova, but lost in the quarterfinals to Elsa Jacquemot and Margaux Rouvroy.

Jacquemot and Rouvroy went on to win the title, defeating Erika Andreeva and Séléna Janicijevic in the final, 6–4, 6–3.

== Seeds ==
1. Ekaterina Alexandrova / Yana Sizikova (quarterfinals)
2. (United Kingdom) Emily Appleton / (United Kingdom) Maia Lumsden (quarterfinals)

== Draw ==
Key

- Q = Qualifier
- WC = Wild card
- LL = Lucky loser
- Alt = Alternate
- ITF = ITF entry
- PR = Protected ranking
- SR = Special ranking
- SE = Special exempt
- JE = Junior exempt
- JR = Junior Accelerator Programme entrant
- CO = College Accelerator Programme entrant
- NG = Next Gen Accelerator Program entrant
- w/o = Walkover
- r = Retired
- d = Defaulted

=== Draw ===
Quarterfinals
1	E Alexandrova; Y Sizikova	6^{5}	1
WC	(France) E Jacquemot (France) M Rouvroy	7^{7}	6
(United Kingdom) S Murray Sharan (United Kingdom) E Silva	3	4
(United States) Q Gleason (Belgium) K Zimmermann	6	6
E Andreeva (France) S Janicijevic	6	6
(Spain) Y Cavallé Reimers (France) E Lechemia	4	3
(Georgia (country)) O Kalashnikova (Belgium) L Salden	7^{8}	7
2	(United Kingdom) E Appleton (United Kingdom) M Lumsden	6^{6}	5

Semifinals
WC	(France) E Jacquemot (France) M Rouvroy	5	6	[10]
(United States) Q Gleason (Belgium) K Zimmermann	7	3	[8]
E Andreeva (France) S Janicijevic	6^{2}	6	[10]
(Georgia (country)) O Kalashnikova (Belgium) L Salden	7^{7}	3	[8]

Final
WC	(France) E Jacquemot (France) M Rouvroy	6	6
E Andreeva (France) S Janicijevic	4	3
