= 2011 Estoril Open – Women's singles qualifying =

This article displays the women qualifying draw of the 2011 Estoril Open.

== Players ==
=== Seeds ===
1. (Austria) Tamira Paszek (qualified)
2. (Belarus) Anastasiya Yakimova (qualified)
3. (Netherlands) Arantxa Rus (second round)
4. (Russia) Vesna Dolonts (first round)
5. (Croatia) Petra Martić (first round)
6. (United Kingdom) Heather Watson (qualifying competition)
7. (Russia) Alexandra Panova (first round)
8. (Netherlands) Michaëlla Krajicek (first round)

=== Qualifiers ===
1. (Austria) Tamira Paszek
2. (Belarus) Anastasiya Yakimova
3. (Spain) Beatriz García Vidagany
4. (United States) Sloane Stephens

== Qualifying draw ==
=== First qualifier ===
First round
1	(Austria) Tamira Paszek	6	6
(Russia) Ekaterina Ivanova	4	3
(Germany) Laura Siegemund	6	6
WC	(Portugal) Ana Claro	3	0
(Switzerland) Stefanie Vögele	4	6	1
(Poland) Katarzyna Piter	6	2	6
(Croatia) Karolina Šprem	6	3	0^{r}
6	(United Kingdom) Heather Watson	1	6	3

Second round
1	(Austria) Tamira Paszek	7	6
(Germany) Laura Siegemund	5	4
(Poland) Katarzyna Piter	4	4
6	(United Kingdom) Heather Watson	6	6

Qualifying competition
1	(Austria) Tamira Paszek	6	6
6	(United Kingdom) Heather Watson	0	3

=== Second qualifier ===
First round
2	(Belarus) Anastasiya Yakimova	7	4	6
(Romania) Alexandra Cadanţu	6^{6}	6	2
(Israel) Julia Glushko	4	6	5
(United States) Lindsay Lee-Waters	6	2	7
(China) Sun Shengnan	6	6
WC	(Portugal) Patricia Martins	3	2
(Greece) Eleni Daniilidou	7	6^{2}	7
7	(Russia) Alexandra Panova	5	7	5

Second round
2	(Belarus) Anastasiya Yakimova	6	6
(United States) Lindsay Lee-Waters	1	1
(China) Sun Shengnan	4	2
(Greece) Eleni Daniilidou	6	6

Qualifying competition
2	(Belarus) Anastasiya Yakimova	6	6
(Greece) Eleni Daniilidou	3	1

=== Third qualifier ===
First round
3	(Netherlands) Arantxa Rus	6	6
(Luxembourg) Anne Kremer	0	1
(Kazakhstan) Sesil Karatantcheva	6	7
(Romania) Elena Bogdan	3	6^{1}
(Romania) Mădălina Gojnea	6	6
WC	(Portugal) Margarida Moura	1	0
(Spain) Beatriz García Vidagany	6	6
8	(Netherlands) Michaëlla Krajicek	3	1

Second round
3	(Netherlands) Arantxa Rus	7	4	2
(Kazakhstan) Sesil Karatantcheva	5	6	6
(Romania) Mădălina Gojnea	6	6^{2}	3
(Spain) Beatriz García Vidagany	1	7	6

Qualifying competition
(Kazakhstan) Sesil Karatantcheva	6	4	3
(Spain) Beatriz García Vidagany	4	6	6

=== Fourth qualifier ===
First round
4	(Russia) Vesna Dolonts	2	5
(United States) Madison Brengle	6	7
(United States) Sloane Stephens	6	6
(Brazil) Ana Clara Duarte	3	2
(Russia) Valeria Savinykh	6	6
WC	(Portugal) Rita Vilaça	0	1
(Russia) Arina Rodionova	6	6
5	(Croatia) Petra Martić	1	1

Second round
(United States) Madison Brengle	2	3
(United States) Sloane Stephens	6	6
(Russia) Valeria Savinykh	6	6
(Russia) Arina Rodionova	3	4

Qualifying competition
(United States) Sloane Stephens	6	6
(Russia) Valeria Savinykh	1	2
