= 2022 Open de Limoges – Singles =

Singles
- 2022 Open de Limoges

Final
- Champion: (Ukraine) Anhelina Kalinina
- Runner-up: (Denmark) Clara Tauson
- Score: 6–3, 5–7, 6–4

Details
- Draw: 32 (4 Q / 6 WC)
- Seeds: 8

Events
Singles	Doubles
- Open de Limoges

Alison Van Uytvanck was the reigning singles champion, but chose not to participate.

Anhelina Kalinina won the title, defeating Clara Tauson in the final, 6–3, 5–7, 6–4.

== Seeds ==
1. (China) Zhang Shuai (quarterfinals)
2. Aliaksandra Sasnovich (first round, withdrew)
3. (France) Alizé Cornet (first round)
4. (Romania) Ana Bogdan (quarterfinals)
5. (Ukraine) Anhelina Kalinina (champion)
6. (Italy) Lucia Bronzetti (semifinals)
7. (Germany) Tatjana Maria (withdrew)
8. (Ukraine) Marta Kostyuk (second round)
9. Anna Blinkova (semifinals)

== Draw ==
Key

- Q = Qualifier
- WC = Wild card
- LL = Lucky loser
- Alt = Alternate
- ITF = ITF entry
- PR = Protected ranking
- SR = Special ranking
- SE = Special exempt
- JE = Junior exempt
- JR = Junior Accelerator Programme entrant
- CO = College Accelerator Programme entrant
- NG = Next Gen Accelerator Program entrant
- w/o = Walkover
- r = Retired
- d = Defaulted

=== Finals ===
Semifinals
5	(Ukraine) Anhelina Kalinina	7	6
9	Anna Blinkova	5	4
(Denmark) Clara Tauson	6	7
6	(Italy) Lucia Bronzetti	3	5

Final
5	(Ukraine) Anhelina Kalinina	6	5	6
(Denmark) Clara Tauson	3	7	4

=== Top half ===
First round
1/WC	(China) S Zhang	2	6	6
(France) J Ponchet	6	2	3
Q	E Reyngold	6	6
Q	(France) M Partaud	0	2
(Germany) A-L Friedsam
LL	(France) J Lim	w/o
(France) C Monnet	4	0
5	(Ukraine) A Kalinina	6	6
4/WC	(Romania) A Bogdan	6	6
(Italy) L Stefanini	1	2
(United States) K Scott	6	6
Q	E Makarova	3	3
(Belgium) G Minnen	6	6
(United States) E Mandlik	4	3
WC	(United States) S Kenin	4	4
9	A Blinkova	6	6

Second round
1/WC	(China) S Zhang	6	6
Q	E Reyngold	1	3
LL	(France) J Lim	0	0
5	(Ukraine) A Kalinina	6	6
4/WC	(Romania) A Bogdan	6	7
(United States) K Scott	3	5
(Belgium) G Minnen	6^{4}	5
9	A Blinkova	7^{7}	7

Quarterfinals
1/WC	(China) S Zhang	3	1
5	(Ukraine) A Kalinina	6	6
4/WC	(Romania) A Bogdan	1	2
9	A Blinkova	6	6

Semifinals
5	(Ukraine) A Kalinina	7	6
9	A Blinkova	5	4

=== Bottom half ===
First round
8	(Ukraine) M Kostyuk	6	6
LL	(Chinese Taipei) J Garland	2	3
(France) K Mladenovic	5	6^{3}
(Denmark) C Tauson	7	7^{7}
LL	(France) É Dartron	3	3
WC	(France) A Albié	6	6
V Gracheva	3	6	6
3/WC	(France) A Cornet	6	4	2
6	(Italy) L Bronzetti	6	6
(United Kingdom) J Burrage	4	4
Q	(Croatia) J Fett	6	7^{7}
(Switzerland) J Züger	2	6^{3}
(Bosnia and Herzegovina) N Berberović	4	2
(France) C Burel	6	6
E Andreeva	w/o
2/WC	A Sasnovich

Second round
8	(Ukraine) M Kostyuk	6^{6}	4
(Denmark) C Tauson	7^{8}	6
WC	(France) A Albié	0	3
V Gracheva	6	6
6	(Italy) L Bronzetti	6	6
Q	(Croatia) J Fett	4	2
(France) C Burel	7	6
E Andreeva	5	4

Quarterfinals
(Denmark) C Tauson	4	6	6
V Gracheva	6	4	2
6	(Italy) L Bronzetti	3	6	6
(France) C Burel	6	4	0

Semifinals
(Denmark) C Tauson	6	7
6	(Italy) L Bronzetti	3	5

== Qualifying ==
=== Seeds ===
1. Ekaterina Makarova (qualified)
2. Ekaterina Reyngold (qualified)
3. (Croatia) Jana Fett (qualified)
4. (Germany) Lena Papadakis (withdrew)
5. (Chinese Taipei) Joanna Garland (qualifying competition, lucky loser)
6. (United States) Hina Inoue (qualifying competition)
7. (France) Émeline Dartron (qualifying competition, lucky loser)
8. (France) Jenny Lim (qualifying competition, lucky loser)

=== Qualifiers ===
1. Ekaterina Makarova
2. Ekaterina Reyngold
3. (Croatia) Jana Fett
4. (France) Marine Partaud

=== Lucky losers ===
1. (France) Émeline Dartron
2. (Chinese Taipei) Joanna Garland
3. (France) Jenny Lim

=== Draw ===
==== First qualifier ====
Qualifying competition
1	Ekaterina Makarova	6^{5}	6	6
6	(United States) Hina Inoue	7^{7}	0	2

==== Second qualifier ====
Qualifying competition
2	Ekaterina Reyngold	6	6
7/WC	(France) Émeline Dartron	4	2

==== Third qualifier ====
Qualifying competition
3	(Croatia) Jana Fett	6	6
5	(Chinese Taipei) Joanna Garland	4	3

==== Fourth qualifier ====
Qualifying competition
Alt	(France) Marine Partaud	7^{7}	6
8/WC	(France) Jenny Lim	6^{5}	3
