= Séléna Janicijevic =

French tennis player (born 2002)

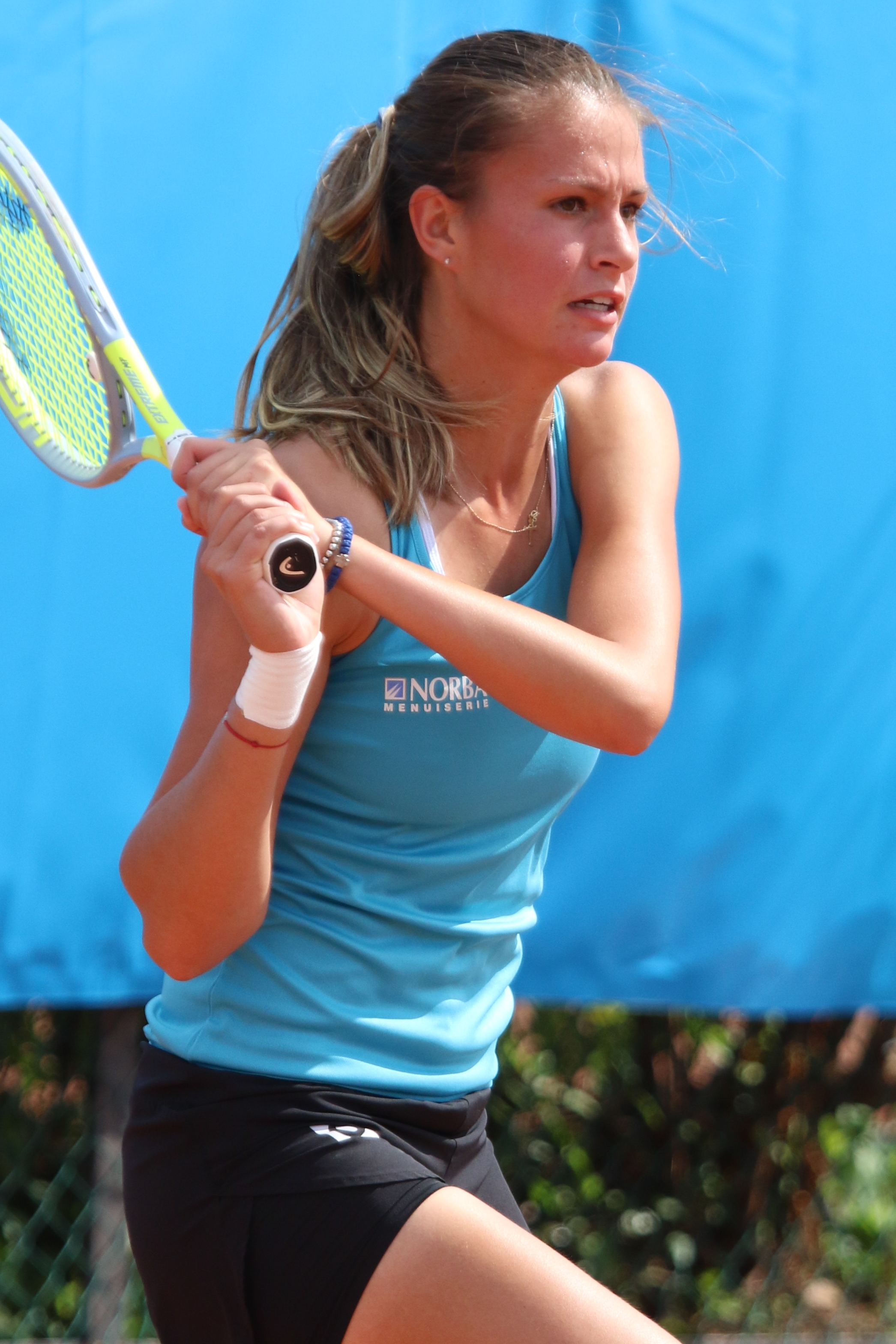
- Janicijevic at the 2021 Open de Biarritz
- Country (sports): France
- Born: 23 July 2002 (age 24) Nogent-sur-Marne, France
- Height: 1.83 m (6 ft 0 in)
- Plays: Right (two-handed backhand)
- Prize money: $791,127

Singles
- Career record: 218–177
- Career titles: 11 ITF
- Highest ranking: No. 153 (16 September 2024)
- Current ranking: No. 322 (2 November 2026)

Grand Slam singles results
- Australian Open: 1R (2023)
- French Open: 1R (2019, 2023)
- Wimbledon: Q2 (2024, 2025)
- US Open: Q2 (2024)

Doubles
- Career record: 22–31
- Career titles: 1 ITF
- Highest ranking: No. 372 (10 November 2025)
- Current ranking: No. 1,222 (2 November 2026)

Grand Slam doubles results
- French Open: 1R (2019, 2020, 2021, 2022)
- Last updated on: 8 November 2026.

Séléna Janicijevic (Serbian Cyrillic: Селена Јанићијевић, romanized: Selena Janićijević, born 23 July 2002) is a French tennis player of Serbian origin.

On 16 September 2024, she reached her career-high of world No. 153 in singles. Janicijevic has won eleven singles titles and one doubles title on the ITF World Tour.

== Career ==
=== 2019: Major debut ===
Janicijevic made her Grand Slam tournament main-draw debut as a wildcard entrant at the 2019 French Open, losing to Iga Świątek in the first round.

=== 2022: ITF World Tour success ===
Janicijevic started the year in Egypt where she reached two semifinals showing in the first two $15k in Giza and Cairo, stopped only by Sapfo Sakellaridi in both tournaments, and a championship win in the $25k in Cairo. This title was followed by another in February, at a $15k in Antalya over Angelica Moratelli. However, she would lose the two consequent tournaments on the Turkish clay, one ending in retirement. She did not play for a few weeks after this, before returning to the European ITFs where she found minimum success. Upon her return to Egypt, she found herself in a much better position, immediately going to the final of a $25k, losing to Anastasia Zolotareva.

She received a wildcard entry into the Paris WTA 125 event, losing to Magda Linette in the first round in three sets. In June, Janicijevic won a $25k in Périgueux, defeating top seed Katharina Hobgarski in the final.

=== 2023: Majorn debut and first WTA Tour win ===
Janicijevic made her debut at the Australian Open, where she defeated Jodie Burrage in the final qualifying round, before losing to Kaja Juvan in the main draw first round. However, she entered a period of drought following that feat as she went on a five-match losing streak, before winning a $25k title in Colombia, her first of the year.

In May, Janicijevic recorded her first career singles main-draw win in Strasbourg by defeating fellow Frenchwoman Océane Dodin in the first round, before losing to sixth seed Varvara Gracheva in the second round.

=== 2024: First WTA Tour quarterfinal ===
In July, Janicijevic made it through to the semifinals at the Contrexéville Open, with wins over wildcard entrant Amandine Hesse, seventh seed Suzan Lamens and Dalila Jakupović, before her run was ended by third seed Mayar Sherif. Later that month she reached her first WTA Tour singles quarterfinal at the Iași Open after winning two qualifying matches and defeating fellow qualifier Gergana Topalova and wildcard entrant Miriam Bulgaru in the main draw first and second rounds respectively. Janicijevic lost her quarterfinal match to fellow French Chloé Paquet, in three sets. As a result, she reached No. 153 in the WTA rankings on 29 July.

Partnering with Erika Andreeva, Janicijevic reached the doubles final at the WTA 125 Open de Limoges, losing to Elsa Jacquemot and Margaux Rouvroy.

== Grand Slam performance ==
Key
W	F	SF	QF	#R	RR	Q#	P#	DNQ	A	Z#	PO	G	S	B	NMS	NTI	P	NH

(W) winner; (F) finalist; (SF) semifinalist; (QF) quarterfinalist; (#R) rounds 4, 3, 2, 1; (RR) round-robin stage; (Q#) qualification round; (P#) preliminary round; (DNQ) did not qualify; (A) absent; (Z#) Davis/Fed Cup Zonal Group (with number indication) or (PO) play-off; (G) gold, (S) silver or (B) bronze Olympic/Paralympic medal; (NMS) not a Masters tournament; (NTI) not a Tier I tournament; (P) postponed; (NH) not held; (SR) strike rate (events won / competed); (W–L) win–loss record.
To avoid confusion and double counting, these charts are updated at the conclusion of a tournament or when the player's participation has ended.

=== Singles ===
Tournament	2019	2020	2021	2022	2023	2024	W–L
Australian Open	A	A	A	A	1R	Q1	0–1
French Open	1R	Q1	Q1	Q2	1R	Q1	0–2
Wimbledon	A	NH	A	A	Q1	Q2	0–0
US Open	A	A	A	Q1	A	Q2	0–0
Win–Loss	0–1	0–0	0–0	0–0	0–2	0–0	0–3

== WTA 125 finals ==
=== Doubles: 1 (runner-up) ===
Result	Date	Tournament	Surface	Partner	Opponents	Score
Loss	Dec 2024	Open de Limoges, France	Hard (i)	Erika Andreeva	(France) Margaux Rouvroy (France) Elsa Jacquemot	4–6, 3–6

== ITF Circuit finals ==
=== Singles: 17 (11 titles, 6 runner-ups) ===
Legend W60/75 tournaments W50 tournaments W25 tournaments W15 tournaments	Finals by surface Clay (11–6)

Result	W–L	Date	Tournament	Tier	Surface	Opponent	Score
Win	1–0	Aug 2021	ITF Knokke, Belgium	W15	Clay	(France) Lucie Nguyen Tan	6–3, 7–6^{(0)}
Win	2–0	Dec 2021	ITF Giza, Egypt	W15	Clay	(Greece) Sapfo Sakellaridi	6–3, 2–6, 6–2
Win	3–0	Jan 2022	ITF Cairo, Egypt	W25	Clay	(Austria) Sinja Kraus	7–5, 3–6, 6–3
Win	4–0	Feb 2022	ITF Antalya, Turkey	W15	Clay	(Italy) Angelica Moratelli	6–3, 6–2
Loss	4–1	May 2022	ITF Cairo, Egypt	W25	Clay	Anastasia Zolotareva	6–7^{(5)}, 6-7^{(4)}
Win	5–1	Jun 2022	ITF Périgueux, France	W25	Clay	(Germany) Katharina Hobgarski	6–3, 6–2
Win	6–1	Jul 2022	ITF Getxo, Spain	W25	Clay	(Greece) Sapfo Sakellaridi	4–6, 6–4, 7–5
Win	7–1	Jul 2022	ITF Perugia, Italy	W25	Clay	(Italy) Anna Turati	6–2, 6–2
Loss	7–2	Sep 2022	ITF Saint-Palais-sur-Mer, France	W25	Clay	(France) Jessika Ponchet	1–6, 4–6
Win	8–2	Apr 2023	ITF Sopo, Colombia	W25	Clay	(Netherlands) Suzan Lamens	6–4, 5–7, 6–4
Win	9–2	Oct 2023	ITF Luján, Argentina	W25	Clay	(Argentina) Julieta Lara Estable	6–4, 7–6^{(0)}
Win	10–2	Dec 2023	Vacaria Open, Brazil	W60	Clay (i)	(Portugal) Francisca Jorge	3–6, 6–3, 6–2
Loss	10–3	Apr 2024	ITF Florianópolis, Brazil	W75	Clay	(Cyprus) Raluca Șerban	5–7, 2–6
Loss	10–4	May 2024	Open Saint-Gaudens, France	W75+H	Clay	(United States) Claire Liu	1–6, 7–6^{(3)}, 0–6
Loss	10–5	Sep 2025	Pazardzhik Cup, Bulgaria	W50+H	Clay	(Bulgaria) Elizara Yaneva	7–5, 2–6, 2–6
Loss	10–6	Oct 2025	ITF Heraklion, Greece	W50	Clay	(Czech Republic) Laura Samson	7–5, 2–6, 1–6
Win	11–6	Jun 2026	ITF Haskovo, Bulgaria	W50	Clay	(Greece) Martha Matoula	6–3, 2–6, 6–0

=== Doubles: 2 (1 title, 1 runner-up) ===
Legend W25/35 tournaments W15 tournaments	Finals by surface Hard (1–0) Clay (0–1)

Result	W–L	Date	Tournament	Tier	Surface	Partnering	Opponents	Score
Win	1–0	Oct 2020	ITF Reims, France	W25	Hard	(United States) Robin Montgomery	(United Kingdom) Harriet Dart (United Kingdom) Sarah Beth Grey	w/o
Loss	1–1	Apr 2026	ITF Santa Margherita di Pula, Italy	W35	Clay	(Serbia) Natalija Senić	(Italy) Deborah Chiesa (Italy) Giorgia Pedone	6–7^{(8)}, 3–6

== Junior Grand Slam tournament finals ==
=== Doubles: 1 (runner-up) ===
Result	Year	Tournament	Surface	Partner	Opponents	Score
Loss	2019	US Open	Hard	(France) Aubane Droguet	(Russia) Oksana Selekhmeteva (Latvia) Kamilla Bartone	5–7, 6–7^{(6–8)}
