= Margaux Rouvroy =

French tennis player (born 2001)

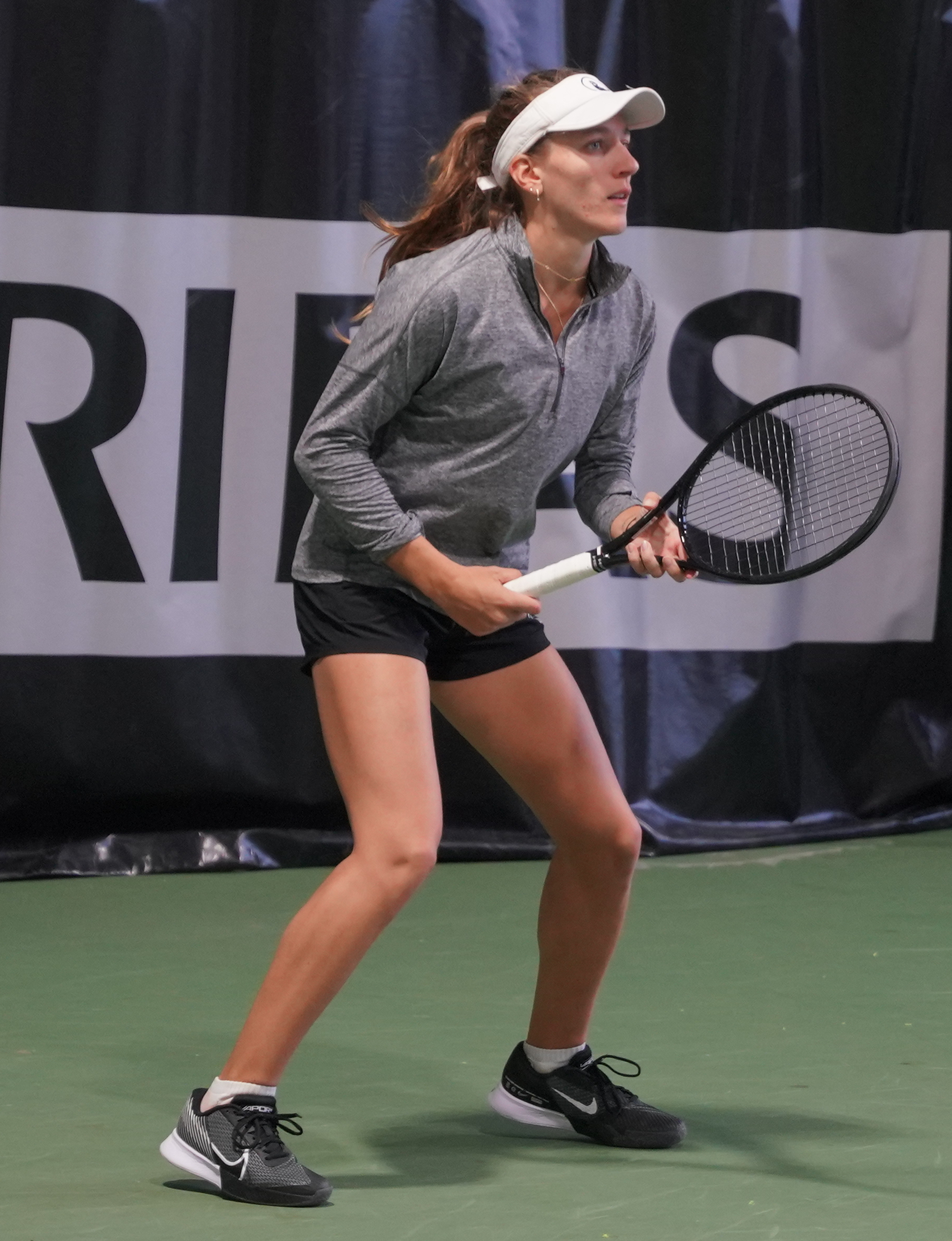
- Rouvroy, 2025
- Country (sports): France
- Born: 22 March 2001 (age 25)
- Plays: Right (one-handed backhand)
- Prize money: $316,582

Singles
- Career record: 209–157
- Career titles: 5 ITF
- Highest ranking: No. 211 (16 September 2024)
- Current ranking: No. 346 (31 August 2026)

Grand Slam singles results
- Australian Open: Q1 (2024)
- French Open: Q2 (2023, 2024, 2025)
- US Open: Q1 (2024)

Doubles
- Career record: 51–64
- Career titles: 1 WTA 125
- Highest ranking: No. 295 (3 February 2025)
- Current ranking: No. 613 (31 August 2026)
- Last updated on: 10 September 2026.

Margaux Rouvroy (born 22 March 2001) is a French tennis player.

She has career-high WTA rankings of No. 211 in singles and No. 295 in doubles. Rouvroy has won one WTA 125 doubles title as well as five singles and three doubles titles on the ITF Circuit.

== Career ==
Rouvroy first made headlines in May 2023 by beating former major champion Sofia Kenin in the French Open qualifiers in straight sets.

Partnering Elsa Jacquemot, she won her first WTA 125 doubles title at the 2024 Open de Limoges, defeating Erika Andreeva and Séléna Janicijevic in the final.

== Grand Slam performance timelines ==
Key
W	F	SF	QF	#R	RR	Q#	DNQ	A	NH

(W) winner; (F) finalist; (SF) semifinalist; (QF) quarterfinalist; (#R) rounds 4, 3, 2, 1; (RR) round-robin stage; (Q#) qualification round; (DNQ) did not qualify; (A) absent; (NH) not held; (SR) strike rate (events won / competed); (W–L) win–loss record.
To avoid confusion and double counting, these charts are updated at the conclusion of a tournament or when the player's participation has ended.

=== Singles ===
Current through the 2026 French Open.

Tournament	2023	2024	2025	2026	W–L
Australian Open	A	Q1	A	A	0–0
French Open	Q2	Q2	Q2	Q1	0–0
Wimbledon	A	A	A	A	0–0
US Open	A	Q1	A	A	0–0
Win–loss	0–0	0–0	0–0	0–0	0–0

== WTA 125 finals ==
=== Doubles: 1 (title) ===
Result	W–L	Date	Tournament	Surface	Partner	Opponents	Score
Win	1–0	Dec 2024	Open de Limoges, France	Hard (i)	(France) Elsa Jacquemot	(Russia) Erika Andreeva (France) Séléna Janicijevic	6–4, 6–3

== ITF Circuit finals ==
=== Singles: 8 (5 titles, 3 runner-ups) ===
Legend W100 tournaments (0–1) W50 tournaments (0–1) W25/35 tournaments (4–1) W15 tournaments (1–0)	Finals by surface Hard (4–1) Clay (1–2)

Result	W–L	Date	Tournament	Tier	Surface	Opponent	Score
Win	1–0	Jun 2019	ITF Tabarka, Tunisia	W15	Clay	(Colombia) María Paulina Pérez	6–4, 6–3
Win	2–0	Jan 2023	ITF Petit-Bourg (Guadeloupe), France	W25	Hard	(France) Emma Léné	6–2, 1–6, 6–1
Win	3–0	Nov 2023	ITF Lousada, Portugal	W25	Hard (i)	(Croatia) Lucija Ćirić Bagarić	6–2, 6–3
Loss	3–1	Jun 2024	Open de Biarritz, France	W100	Clay	(Japan) Sara Saito	7–5, 3–6, 3–6
Loss	3–2	Sep 2024	ITF Reims, France	W35	Hard (i)	Julia Avdeeva	6–3, 3–6, 4–6
Win	4–2	Nov 2024	ITF Lousada, Portugal	W35	Hard (i)	(Portugal) Matilde Jorge	7–5, 6–3
Win	5–2	Jan 2026	ITF Petit-Bourg, France (Guadeloupe)	W25	Hard	(Russia) Kira Pavlova	3–6, 6–3, 6–1
Loss	5–3	Apr 2026	Bujumbura, Burundi	W50	Clay	(Russia) Darya Astakhova	4–6, 4–6

=== Doubles: 5 (3 titles, 2 runner-ups) ===
Legend W35 tournaments (1–2) W15 tournaments (2–0)	Finals by surface Hard (1–1) Clay (2–1)

Result	W–L	Date	Tournament	Tier	Surface	Partner	Opponents	Score
Win	1–0	Jul 2019	ITF Les Contamines-Montjoie, France	W15	Hard	(France) Aubane Droguet	(France) Rania Azziz (France) Mathilde Dury	7–5, 6–3
Win	2–0	Jul 2021	ITF Knokke, Belgium	W15	Clay	(France) Émeline Dartron	(France) Anaëlle Leclercq (France) Lucie Nguyen Tan	6–1, 6–3
Loss	2–1	Apr 2024	ITF Hammamet, Tunisia	W35	Clay	(France) Émeline Dartron	(Canada) Carson Branstine (Russia) Ekaterina Reyngold	3–6, 0–6
Loss	2–2	Jan 2026	ITF Le Lamentin, France (Martinique)	W35	Hard	(France) Jenny Lim	(United States) Kayla Day (United States) Jenna Dean	4–6, 6–1, [7–10]
Win	3–2	Mar 2026	ITF San Gregorio, Italy	W35	Clay	(France) Jenny Lim	(Germany) Joëlle Steur (Slovakia) Nina Vargová	6–4, 2–6, [10–7]
