= Marine Partaud =

French tennis player (born 1994)

- Country (sports): France
- Born: 9 November 1994 (age 31) Poitiers, France
- Plays: Right (two-handed backhand)
- Prize money: $132,488

Singles
- Career record: 281–260
- Career titles: 4 ITF
- Highest ranking: No. 371 (18 July 2022)

Doubles
- Career record: 143–155
- Career titles: 11 ITF
- Highest ranking: No. 297 (31 October 2022)

Grand Slam doubles results
- French Open: 1R (2017)
- Last updated on: 28 June 2026.

Marine Partaud (French pronunciation: [maʁin paʁto]; born 9 November 1994) is a French inactive tennis player.

She has career-high WTA rankings of 371 in singles, attained on 18 July 2022, and 297 in doubles, achieved on 31 October 2022. Partaud has won four singles and eleven doubles titles on the ITF Women's Circuit.

== Career ==
Partaud made her Grand Slam tournament debut at the 2017 French Open, where she and her partner Virginie Razzano entered the event as wildcards and lost in the first round to the Australian pair of Ashleigh Barty and Casey Dellacqua.

== ITF Circuit finals ==
=== Singles: 9 (4 titles, 5 runner-ups) ===
Legend $25,000 tournaments $10/15,000 tournaments	Finals by surface Hard (0–1) Clay (4–4)

Result	W–L	Date	Tournament	Tier	Surface	Opponent	Score
Win	1–0	Sep 2012	ITF Lleida, Spain	10,000	Clay	(Argentina) Tatiana Búa	6–4, 6–4
Loss	1–1	May 2013	ITF Girona, Spain	10,000	Clay	(Spain) Lucía Cervera Vázquez	0–6, 1–6
Loss	1–2	Aug 2015	ITF Târgu Jiu, Romania	10,000	Clay	(Serbia) Milana Spremo	3–6, 5–7
Win	2–2	Mar 2017	ITF Le Havre, France	15,000	Clay (i)	(France) Priscilla Heise	6–1, 7–5
Win	3–2	Aug 2017	ITF Mrągowo, Poland	15,000	Clay	(Czech Republic) Monika Kilnarová	7–6^{(4)}, 6–1
Loss	3–3	Mar 2018	ITF Gonesse, France	15,000	Clay (i)	(Luxembourg) Eléonora Molinaro	2–6, 1–6
Loss	3–4	Mar 2018	ITF Le Havre, France	15,000	Clay (i)	(Italy) Angelica Moratelli	7–5, 1–6, 4–6
Loss	3–5	Jan 2020	ITF Fort-de-France, Martinique	15,000	Hard	(France) Audrey Albié	3–6, 4–6
Win	4–5	Mar 2021	ITF Gonesse, France	15,000	Clay (i)	(Spain) Jéssica Bouzas Maneiro	6–4, 6–3

=== Doubles: 19 (11 titles, 8 runner-ups) ===
Legend $25,000 tournaments $10/15,000 tournaments	Finals by surface Hard (3–2) Clay (8–6)

Result	W–L	Date	Tournament	Tier	Surface	Partner	Opponents	Score
Win	1–0	Dec 2013	ITF Borriol, Spain	10,000	Clay	(France) Léolia Jeanjean	(United States) Tina Tehrani (Netherlands) Mandy Wagemaker	4–6, 6–1, [10–3]
Loss	1–1	Nov 2014	ITF Heraklion, Greece	10,000	Hard	(Bosnia and Herzegovina) Anita Husarić	(Poland) Natalia Siedliska (Germany) Julia Wachaczyk	2–6, 7–6^{(2)}, [6–10]
Loss	1–2	Feb 2015	ITF Mâcon, France	10,000	Hard (i)	(France) Kinnie Laisné	(Bulgaria) Isabella Shinikova (Netherlands) Eva Wacanno	4–6, 6–3, [5–10]
Win	2–2	Apr 2015	ITF Cairo, Egypt	10,000	Clay	(Hungary) Naomi Totka	(Slovakia) Barbara Kötelesová (Slovakia) Tereza Mihalíková	6–2, 7–5
Loss	2–3	Apr 2015	ITF Cairo, Egypt	15,000	Clay	(France) Amandine Hesse	(Austria) Barbara Haas (Egypt) Sandra Samir	6–0, 4–6, [7–10]
Win	3–3	Sep 2015	ITF Tlemcen, Algeria	10,000	Clay	(Belgium) Déborah Kerfs	(France) Amandine Cazeaux (Germany) Nora Niedmers	6–3, 4–6, [10–6]
Win	4–3	Sep 2015	ITF Algiers, Algeria	10,000	Clay	(Belgium) Déborah Kerfs	(France) Amandine Cazeaux (Germany) Nora Niedmers	3–6, 6–2, [10–2]
Win	5–3	Mar 2016	ITF Gonesse, France	10,000	Clay (i)	(France) Laëtitia Sarrazin	(Greece) Valentini Grammatikopoulou (Poland) Justyna Jegiołka	6–1, 3–6, [10–6]
Loss	5–4	May 2016	ITF Bol, Croatia	10,000	Clay	(France) Laëtitia Sarrazin	(Australia) Naiktha Bains (United States) Dasha Ivanova	2–6, 6–4, [7–10]
Win	6–4	Aug 2016	ITF Las Palmas, Spain	10,000	Clay	(Sweden) Jacqueline Cabaj Awad	(Spain) Yvonne Cavallé Reimers (Ecuador) Charlotte Römer	1–6, 7–5, [10–8]
Win	7–4	Aug 2017	ITF Mrągowo, Poland	15,000	Clay	(Italy) Angelica Moratelli	(United States) Akiko Okuda (Dominican Republic) Kelly Williford	6–2, 6–3
Loss	7–5	Sep 2017	ITF Mrągowo, Poland	15,000	Clay	(Italy) Angelica Moratelli	(Poland) Daria Kuczer (Poland) Marta Leśniak	2–6, 3–6
Win	8–5	Aug 2019	ITF Braunschweig, Germany	25,000	Clay	(Russia) Polina Leykina	(Uzbekistan) Akgul Amanmuradova (Uzbekistan) Albina Khabibulina	6–4, 1–6, [10–5]
Win	9–5	Jan 2020	ITF Fort-de-France, Martinique	15,000	Hard	(France) Audrey Albié	(United States) Alexandra Riley (United States) Jamilah Snells	6–2, 7–6^{(3)}
Win	10–5	Feb 2020	ITF Mâcon, France	25,000	Hard (i)	(France) Audrey Albié	(Romania) Miriam Bulgaru (France) Estelle Cascino	3–6, 7–6^{(3)}, [12–10]
Win	11–5	Aug 2020	ITF Alkmaar, Netherlands	15,000	Hard	(Netherlands) Suzan Lamens	(Netherlands) Eva Vedder (Netherlands) Stéphanie Visscher	7–5, 7–6^{(3)}
Loss	11–6	Nov 2021	ITF Orlando, United States	25,000	Clay	(Mexico) María Portillo Ramírez	(United States) Anna Rogers (United States) Christina Rosca	3–6, 1–6
Loss	11–7	Aug 2022	ITF Mogyoród, Hungary	25,000	Clay	(France) Carole Monnet	(Romania) Ilona Georgiana Ghioroaie (Hungary) Amarissa Tóth	5–7, 0–6
Loss	11–8	Sep 2022	ITF Saint-Palais-sur-Mer, France	25,000	Clay	(Ukraine) Valeriya Strakhova	(Belgium) Magali Kempen (China) Lu Jiajing	4–6, 4–6
