= Ekaterina Alexandrova career statistics =

Russian tennis player

Career finals
Discipline	Type	Won	Lost	Total
Singles	Grand Slam	–	–	–
Singles	WTA Finals	–	–	–
Singles	WTA 1000	–	–	–
Singles	WTA Tour	5	8	13
Singles	Olympics	–	–	–
Singles	Total	5	8	13
Doubles	Grand Slam	–	–	–
Doubles	WTA Finals	–	–	–
Doubles	WTA 1000	–	–	–
Doubles	WTA Tour	3	1	4
Doubles	Olympics	–	–	–
Doubles	Total	3	1	4

This is a list of the main career statistics of professional Russian tennis player Ekaterina Alexandrova.

== Performance timelines ==
Key
W	F	SF	QF	#R	RR	Q#	P#	DNQ	A	Z#	PO	G	S	B	NMS	NTI	P	NH

(W) winner; (F) finalist; (SF) semifinalist; (QF) quarterfinalist; (#R) rounds 4, 3, 2, 1; (RR) round-robin stage; (Q#) qualification round; (P#) preliminary round; (DNQ) did not qualify; (A) absent; (Z#) Davis/Fed Cup Zonal Group (with number indication) or (PO) play-off; (G) gold, (S) silver or (B) bronze Olympic/Paralympic medal; (NMS) not a Masters tournament; (NTI) not a Tier I tournament; (P) postponed; (NH) not held; (SR) strike rate (events won / competed); (W–L) win–loss record.
To avoid confusion and double counting, these charts are updated at the conclusion of a tournament or when the player's participation has ended.

Only main-draw results in WTA Tour, Grand Slam tournaments, Billie Jean King Cup (Fed Cup), United Cup, Hopman Cup and Olympic Games are included in win–loss records.

=== Singles ===
Current through the 2026 Canadian Open.

Tournament	2016	2017	2018	2019	2020	2021	2022	2023	2024	2025	2026	SR	W–L	Win %
Grand Slam tournaments
Australian Open	A	1R	2R	1R	3R	3R	1R	3R	1R	1R	1R	0 / 10	7–10	41%
French Open	A	2R	1R	3R	3R	2R	2R	3R	1R	4R	1R	0 / 10	12–10	55%
Wimbledon	2R	1R	1R	1R	NH	2R	A (Note: Suspended due to the ban of Russian and Belarusian athletes in light of the Russian invasion of Ukraine.)	4R	A	4R	3R	0 / 8	10–8	56%
US Open	Q2	2R	1R	2R	2R	2R	2R	3R	3R	4R	3R	0 / 10	14–10	58%
Win–loss	1–1	2–4	1–4	3–4	5–3	5–4	2–3	9–4	2–3	9–4	4–4	0 / 38	43–38	53%
Year-end championships
WTA Finals	DNQ				NH	DNQ				RR	DNQ	0 / 1	0–1	0%
WTA Elite Trophy	DNQ				NH			A	NH			0 / 0	0–0	–
National representation
BJK Cup (Note: Formerly known as Fed Cup uNT1l 2020.)	A	A	A	A	W (Note: Edition is split into the two years due to COVID-19.)		disqualified					1 / 1	2–1	67%
Summer Olympics	A	NH				2R	NH		1R	NH		0 / 2	1–2	33%
WTA 1000 tournaments
Qatar Open	A	NTI	Q2	NTI	1R	NTI	A	NTI	3R	SF	2R	0 / 4	6–4	60%
Dubai Championships	NTI	A	NTI	A	NTI	1R	NTI	A	1R	1R	2R	0 / 4	1–4	20%
Indian Wells Open	A	A	A	3R	NH	A	2R	2R	2R	2R	2R	0 / 6	3–6	33%
Miami Open	A	A	A	1R	NH	3R	2R	QF	SF	2R	3R	0 / 7	10–7	59%
Madrid Open	A	Q2	A	Q1	NH	1R	SF	4R	2R	4R	A	0 / 5	8–5	62%
Italian Open	A	A	A	Q1	1R	3R	2R	2R	2R	A	2R	0 / 6	2–6	25%
Canadian Open	A	2R	Q1	3R	NH	A	A	A	A	2R	QF	0 / 4	6–4	60%
Cincinnati Open	A	Q2	A	2R	2R	1R	2R	1R	1R	4R	3R	0 / 8	6–8	42%
China Open	A	A	A	3R	NH			1R	2R	2R	QF	0 / 5	5–5	33%
Wuhan Open	A	A	A	1R	NH				QF	3R		0 / 3	5–3	63%
Guadalajara Open	NH						1R	3R	NTI			0 / 2	1–2	33%
Win–loss	0–0	1–1	0–0	7–6	1–3	2–5	8–6	6–7	9–9	10–9	8–8	0 / 52	49–52	47%
Career statistics
	2016	2017	2018	2019	2020	2021	2022	2023	2024	2025	2026	SR	W–L	Win %
Tournaments	3	12	13	24	13	21	20	22	19	27	23	Career total: 197		
Titles	0	0	0	0	1	0	2	1	0	1	0	Career total: 5		
Finals	0	0	1	0	1	1	2	2	1	4	1	Career total: 13		
Hard win–loss	2–2	4–6	8–6	22–16	16–8	16–15	16–12	17–14	17–11	25–17	11–13	3 / 123	154–120	56%
Clay win–loss	0–0	2–5	1–5	3–4	4–4	6–5	11–5	6–5	1–6	13–5	1–4	0 / 51	48–48	50%
Grass win–loss	1–1	0–1	0–2	5–4	0–0	3–2	6–1	10–2	4–2	8–3	5–4	2 / 24	42–22	66%
Overall win–loss	3–3	6–12	9–13	30–24	20–12	25–22	33–18	33–21	22–19	46–25	17–21	4 / 198	244–190	56%
Win %	50%	33%	41%	56%	63%	53%	65%	61%	54%	65%	45%	Career total: 56%		
Year-end ranking (Note: 2012: WTA ranking–772, 2013: WTA ranking–410, 2014: WTA ranking–256, 2015: WTA ranking–269.)	133	73	93	35	33	33	19	21	28	10		$10,195,518		

=== Doubles ===
Current through the 2024 Australian Open.

Tournament	2017	2018	2019	2020	2021	2022	2023	2024	2025	2026	SR	W–L	Win %
Grand Slam tournaments
Australian Open	A	2R	A	1R	1R	A	1R	3R	2R (Note: Withdrew during the tournament. Not counted as a loss.)	1R	0 / 7	4–6	20%
French Open	A	A	2R	2R	1R	1R	1R	1R	2R	1R	0 / 8	3–8	29%
Wimbledon	A	A	2R	NH	1R	A	2R	A	3R	2R	0 / 5	5–5	40%
US Open	A	A	2R	A	1R	1R	1R	1R	3R	1R	0 / 7	3–7	20%
Win–Loss	0–0	1–1	3–3	1–2	0–4	0–2	1–4	2–3	6–3	1–4	0 / 26	15–26	27%
National representation
Summer Olympics	NH				A	NH		1R	NH		0 / 1	0–1	–
WTA 1000 tournaments
Qatar Open	NTI	A	NTI	2R	NTI	A	A	QF	1R	A	0 / 3	3–3	50%
Dubai Championships	A	NTI	A	NTI	A	NTI	1R	1R	A	A	0 / 2	0–2	0%
Indian Wells Open	A	A	A	NH	A	A	A	1R	2R	2R	0 / 3	2–3	–
Miami Open	A	A	A	NH	2R	SF	2R	QF	QF	2R	0 / 6	10–5	63%
Madrid Open	A	A	A	NH	1R	A	1R	A	2R	A	0 / 3	1–3	0%
Italian Open	A	A	A	A	1R	2R	2R	1R	A	A	0 / 4	2–4	40%
Canadian Open	A	A	A	NH	A	A	A	A	A	1R	0 / 1	0–1	–
Cincinnati Open	A	A	A	2R	A	QF	1R	2R	1R	A	0 / 5	3–5	50%
China Open	A	A	2R	NH			A	A	A	1R	0 / 2	1–2	50%
Wuhan Open	A	A	1R	NH				SF	A		0 / 2	3–2	0%
Career statistics
	2017	2018	2019	2020	2021	2022	2023	2024	2025	2026	SR	W–L	Win %
Tournaments	1	3	8	7	14	10	8				Career total: 51		
Titles	0	0	1	0	0	0	0				Career total: 1		
Finals	0	0	1	0	0	0	0				Career total: 1		
Overall win–loss	0–1	1–3	9–7	3–7	5–14	11–10	5–8				1 / 51	34–50	40%
Win %	0%	25%	56%	30%	26%	52%	38%				Career total: 40%		
Year-end ranking (Note: 2012: WTA ranking–772, 2013: WTA ranking–410, 2014: WTA ranking–256, 2015: WTA ranking–269.)	n/a	427	99	101	147	69	104						

== WTA Tour finals ==
=== Singles: 13 (5 titles, 8 runner-ups) ===
Legend Premier / WTA 500 (1–6) International / WTA 250 (4–2)	Finals by surface Hard (3–8) Grass (2–0)	Finals by setting Outdoor (4–5) Indoor (1–3)

Result	W–L	Date	Tournament	Tier	Surface	Opponent	Score
Loss	0–1	Oct 2018	Linz Open, Austria	International	Hard (i)	(Italy) Camila Giorgi	3–6, 1–6
Win	1–1	Jan 2020	Shenzhen Open, China	International	Hard	(Kazakhstan) Elena Rybakina	6–2, 6–4
Loss	1–2	Oct 2021	Kremlin Cup, Russia	WTA 500	Hard (i)	(Estonia) Anett Kontaveit	6–4, 4–6, 5–7
Win	2–2	Jun 2022	Rosmalen Open, Netherlands	WTA 250	Grass	Aryna Sabalenka	7–5, 6–0
Win	3–2	Sep 2022	Korea Open, South Korea	WTA 250	Hard	(Latvia) Jeļena Ostapenko	7–6^{(7–4)}, 6–0
Win	4–2	Jun 2023	Rosmalen Open, Netherlands (2)	WTA 250	Grass	Veronika Kudermetova	4–6, 6–4, 7–6^{(7–3)}
Loss	4–3	Aug 2023	Tennis in the Land, United States	WTA 250	Hard	(Spain) Sara Sorribes Tormo	6–3, 4–6, 4–6
Loss	4–4	Feb 2024	Linz Open, Austria	WTA 500	Hard (i)	(Latvia) Jeļena Ostapenko	2–6, 3–6
Win	5–4	Feb 2025	Linz Open, Austria	WTA 500	Hard (i)	(Ukraine) Dayana Yastremska	6–2, 3–6, 7–5
Loss	5–5	Aug 2025	Monterrey Open, Mexico	WTA 500	Hard	Diana Shnaider	3–6, 6–4, 4–6
Loss	5–6	Sep 2025	Korea Open, South Korea	WTA 500	Hard	(Poland) Iga Świątek	6–1, 6–7^{(2–7)}, 5–7
Loss	5–7	Oct 2025	Ningbo Open, China	WTA 500	Hard	(Kazakhstan) Elena Rybakina	6–3, 0–6, 2–6
Loss	5–8	Feb 2026	Abu Dhabi Open, UAE	WTA 500	Hard	(Czech Republic) Sára Bejlek	6–7^{(5–7)}, 1–6

=== Doubles: 4 (3 titles, 1 runner-up) ===
Legend Premier / WTA 500 (2–1) International / WTA 250 (1–0)	Finals by surface Hard (2–0) Clay (0–1) Grass (1–0)	Finals by setting Outdoor (2–0) Indoor (1–1)

Result	W–L	Date	Tournament	Tier	Surface	Partner	Opponents	Score
Win	1–0	Feb 2019	Hungarian Ladies Open, Hungary	International	Hard (i)	(Russia) Vera Zvonareva	(Hungary) Fanny Stollár (United Kingdom) Heather Watson	6–4, 4–6, [10–7]
Loss	1–1	Apr 2025	Stuttgart Open, Germany	WTA 500	Clay (i)	(China) Zhang Shuai	(Canada) Gabriela Dabrowski (New Zealand) Erin Routliffe	3–6, 3–6
Win	2–1	Feb 2026	Abu Dhabi Open, UAE	WTA 500	Hard	(Australia) Maya Joint	(Slovakia) Tereza Mihalíková (United Kingdom) Olivia Nicholls	3–6, 7–6^{(7–5)}, [10–8]
Win	3–1	Jun 2026	Berlin Open, Germany	WTA 500	Grass	(Czech Republic) Linda Nosková	(Italy) Sara Errani (United States) Nicole Melichar-Martinez	6–2, 6–4

== WTA 125 finals ==
=== Singles: 3 (3 titles) ===
Result	W–L	Date	Tournament	Surface	Opponent	Score
Win	1–0	Nov 2016	Open de Limoges, France	Hard (i)	(France) Caroline Garcia	6–4, 6–0
Win	2–0	Nov 2018	Open de Limoges, France (2)	Hard (i)	(Russia) Evgeniya Rodina	6–2, 6–2
Win	3–0	Dec 2019	Open de Limoges, France (3)	Hard (i)	(Belarus) Aliaksandra Sasnovich	6–1, 6–3

=== Doubles: 1 (runner-up) ===
Result	Date	Tournament	Surface	Partner	Opponents	Score
Loss	Dec 2019	Open de Limoges, France	Hard (i)	(Georgia (country)) Oksana Kalashnikova	(Spain) Georgina García Pérez (Spain) Sara Sorribes Tormo	2–6, 6–7^{(3–7)}

== ITF Circuit finals ==
=== Singles: 15 (7 titles, 8 runner-ups) ===
Legend W100 tournaments (0–1) W50/60 tournaments (2–1) W25 tournaments (1–2) W10/15 tournaments (4–4)	Finals by surface Hard (4–1) Clay (2–6) Carpet (1–1)

Result	W–L	Date	Tournament	Tier	Surface	Opponent	Score
Loss	0–1	Jan 2013	ITF Kaarst, Germany	W10	Carpet (i)	(Germany) Julia Kimmelmann	3–6, 2–6
Win	1–1	Feb 2013	ITF Kreuzlingen, Switzerland	W10	Carpet (i)	(Switzerland) Timea Bacsinszky	6–4, 6–3
Loss	1–2	Jul 2013	ITF Přerov, Czech Republic	W15	Clay	(Hungary) Réka Luca Jani	2–6, 6–7^{(4–7)}
Win	2–2	Sep 2013	ITF Prague, Czech Republic	W10	Clay	(Slovakia) Lenka Juríková	6–3, 3–6, 6–2
Win	3–2	Dec 2013	ITF Vendryně, Czech Republic	W15	Hard (i)	(Czech Republic) Kateřina Vaňková	5–7, 7–6^{(7–0)}, 6–1
Win	4–2	May 2014	Wiesbaden Open, Germany	W25	Clay	(Austria) Tamira Paszek	7–6^{(7–4)}, 4–6, 6–3
Loss	4–3	Nov 2014	ITF Minsk, Belarus	W25	Hard (i)	(Croatia) Ana Vrljić	6–3, 4–6, 6–7^{(7–9)}
Loss	4–4	Jun 2015	ITF Přerov, Czech Republic	W15	Clay	(Czech Republic) Markéta Vondroušová	1–6, 4–6
Loss	4–5	Aug 2015	ITF Braunschweig, Germany	W15	Clay	(Switzerland) Jil Teichmann	3–6, 3–6
Win	5–5	Feb 2016	ITF Trnava, Slovakia	W10	Hard (i)	(Czech Republic) Karolína Muchová	6–1, 6–3
Loss	5–6	May 2016	ITF Győr, Hungary	W25	Clay	(Slovenia) Tamara Zidanšek	4–6, 4–6
Loss	5–7	Jul 2016	ITS Cup Olomouc, Czech Republic	W50	Clay	(Russia) Elizaveta Kulichkova	6–4, 2–6, 1–6
Win	6–7	Mar 2017	Pingshan Open, China	W60	Hard	(Belarus) Aryna Sabalenka	6–2, 7–5
Win	7–7	Apr 2017	Open de Seine-et-Marne, France	W60	Hard (i)	(Netherlands) Richèl Hogenkamp	6–2, 6–7^{(3–7)}, 6–3
Loss	7–8	Jul 2018	Budapest Pro Open, Hungary	W100	Clay	(Slovakia) Viktória Kužmová	3–6, 6–4, 1–6

== Team competition ==
=== Billie Jean King Cup participation ===
==== Singles (2–1) ====
Legend
Finals (0–1)
Qualifying round (2–0)

Edition	Round	Date	Location	Against	Surface	Opponent	W/L	Result
2020–21	QR	Feb 2020	Cluj-Napoca (ROU)	Romania	Hard (i)	Elena-Gabriela Ruse	W	6–1, 6–4
2020–21	QR	Feb 2020	Cluj-Napoca (ROU)	Romania	Hard (i)	Ana Bogdan	W	7–5, 3–6, 7–5
2020–21	WG RR	Nov 2021	Prague (CZE)	France	Hard (i)	Clara Burel	L	6–3, 4–6, 3–6

== WTA Tour career earnings ==
Current after the 2022 Korea Open.

Year	Grand Slam titles	WTA titles	Total titles	Earnings ($)	Money list rank
2014	–	–	–	12,800	415
2015	–	–	–	12,767	439
2016	–	–	–	117,410	174
2017	–	–	–	321,619	110
2018	–	–	–	318,719	119
2019	–	–	–	804,311	51
2020	–	1	1	679,382	24
2021	–	–	–	421,836	42
2022	–	2	2	1,041,182	32
Career	0	3	3	4,152,005	161

== Wins against top 10 players ==
- Alexandrova has a 21–40 (34%) record against players who were, at the time the match was played, ranked in the top 10.

No.	Player	Rk	Event	Surface	Rd	Score	Rk	Years	Ref
1.	(Latvia) Jeļena Ostapenko	10	Korea Open, South Korea	Hard	2R	6–3, 6–2	122	2018	
2.	(Romania) Simona Halep	5	China Open, China	Hard	2R	6–2, 6–3	38	2019	
3.	(Romania) Simona Halep	2	Gippsland Trophy, Australia	Hard	QF	6–2, 6–1	33	2021	
4.	(Ukraine) Elina Svitolina	6	German Open, Germany	Grass	2R	6–4, 7–5	34	2021	
5.	(Tunisia) Ons Jabeur	8	Kremlin Cup, Russia	Hard (i)	1R	6–1, 1–0, ret.	37	2021	
6.	(Belarus) Aryna Sabalenka	2	Kremlin Cup, Russia	Hard (i)	QF	6–3, 6–4	37	2021	
7.	(Greece) Maria Sakkari	7	Kremlin Cup, Russia	Hard (i)	SF	4–1, ret.	37	2021	
8.	(Czech Republic) Karolína Plíšková	7	Charleston Open, United States	Clay (green)	3R	6–3, 6–1	54	2022	
9.	Aryna Sabalenka	6	Rosmalen Open, Netherlands	Grass	F	7–5, 6–0	30	2022	
10.	(Switzerland) Belinda Bencic	9	Miami Open, United States	Hard	3R	7–6^{(10–8)}, 6–3	18	2023	
11.	(United States) Coco Gauff	7	German Open, Germany	Grass	2R	6–4, 6–0	22	2023	
12.	(Kazakhstan) Elena Rybakina	3	Adelaide International, Australia	Hard	QF	6–3, 6–3	21	2024	
13.	(Poland) Iga Świątek	1	Miami Open, United States	Hard	4R	6–4, 6–2	16	2024	
14.	(United States) Jessica Pegula	5	Miami Open, United States	Hard	QF	3–6, 6–4, 6–4	16	2024	
15.	Aryna Sabalenka	1	Qatar Ladies Open, Qatar	Hard	2R	3–6, 6–3, 7–6^{(7–5)}	26	2025	
16.	(United States) Jessica Pegula	5	Qatar Open, Qatar	Hard	QF	4–6, 6–1, 6–1	26	2025	
17.	(China) Zheng Qinwen	8	Charleston Open, United States	Clay (green)	QF	6–1, 6–4	26	2025	
18.	Mirra Andreeva	7	Stuttgart Open, Germany	Clay (i)	2R	6–3, 6–2	22	2025	
19.	(United States) Jessica Pegula	3	Stuttgart Open, Germany	Clay (i)	QF	6–0, 6–4	22	2025	
20.	Mirra Andreeva	5	Bad Homburg Open, Germany	Grass	2R	6–3, 6–4	19	2026	
21.	Aryna Sabalenka	1	Canadian Open, Canada	Hard	4R	7–6^{(7–3)}, 4–6, 6–4	19	2026	

- Key: (Rk) first use, opponent rank; (Rd) round; (Rk) 2nd use, player rank; (Ref) reference; (F) final; (SF) semifinal; (QF) quarterfinal; (#R) rounds 4, 3, 2, 1; (RR) round-robin stage; (Q#) qualifying rounds or stages (3), 2, 1.

== Awards ==
National

- The Russian Cup in the nominations:
  - Olympians-2020;
  - Team of the Year: 2021.
