= 2017 Open de Limoges =

- Date: 6–12 November
- Edition: 11th
- Category: WTA 125K series
- Prize money: $115,000
- Surface: Hard (indoor)
- Location: Limoges, France

Champions

Singles
- (Romania) Monica Niculescu

Doubles
- (Russia) Valeria Savinykh / (Belgium) Maryna Zanevska
| ← 2016 · | Open de Limoges | · 2018 → |

The 2017 Open de Limoges was a professional tennis tournament played on indoor hard courts. It was the 11th edition of the tournament and part of the 2017 WTA 125K series, offering a total of $115,000 in prize money. It took place in Limoges, France, on 6–12 November 2017.

== Singles main draw entrants ==
=== Seeds ===
| Country | Player | Rank^{1} | Seed |
|---|---|---|---|
| FRA | Alizé Cornet | 37 | 1 |
| RUS | Ekaterina Alexandrova | 73 | 2 |
| FRA | Pauline Parmentier | 91 | 3 |
| CRO | Jana Fett | 98 | 4 |
| ROU | Monica Niculescu | 100 | 5 |
| ~~SLO~~ | ~~Polona Hercog~~ | ~~104~~ | ~~6~~ |
| EST | Kaia Kanepi | 106 | 7 |
| SVK | Jana Čepelová | 109 | 8 |
| NED | Richèl Hogenkamp | 110 | 9 |

- ^{1} Rankings as of 30 October 2017.

=== Other entrants ===
The following players received a wildcard into the singles main draw:

- (France) Alizé Cornet
- (Serbia) Olga Danilović
- (Germany) Sabine Lisicki
- (France) Chloé Paquet
- (France) Jessika Ponchet

The following players received entry from the qualifying draw:

- (France) Manon Arcangioli
- (Romania) Elena-Gabriela Ruse
- (Spain) Olga Sáez Larra
- (Chile) Daniela Seguel

The following player received entry as a lucky loser:

- (Venezuela) Andrea Gámiz

=== Withdrawals ===
Before the tournament

- (Slovenia) Polona Hercog (back/neck injury) →replaced by (Venezuela) Andrea Gámiz

== Doubles entrants ==
=== Seeds ===
| Country | Player | Country | Player | Rank^{1} | Seed |
|---|---|---|---|---|---|
| RUS | Natela Dzalamidze | SUI | Xenia Knoll | 119 | 1 |
| ROU | Alexandra Cadanțu | ROU | Monica Niculescu | 190 | 2 |
| NED | Michaëlla Krajicek | RUS | Alla Kudryavtseva | 224 | 3 |
| RUS | Valeria Savinykh | BEL | Maryna Zanevska | 240 | 4 |

- ^{1} Rankings as of 30 October 2017.

=== Other entrants ===
The following pair received a wildcard into the doubles main draw:

- (France) Chloé Paquet / (France) Pauline Parmentier

== Champions ==
=== Singles ===
- (Romania) Monica Niculescu def. (Germany) Antonia Lottner, 6–4, 6–2

=== Doubles ===
- (Russia) Valeria Savinykh / (Belgium) Maryna Zanevska def. (France) Chloé Paquet / (France) Pauline Parmentier, 6–0, 6–2
