= 2018 Open de Limoges =

- Date: 5–11 November
- Edition: 12th
- Category: WTA 125K series
- Prize money: $125,000
- Surface: Hard (indoor)
- Location: Limoges, France

Champions

Singles
- (Russia) Ekaterina Alexandrova

Doubles
- (Russia) Veronika Kudermetova / (Kazakhstan) Galina Voskoboeva
← 2017 ·	Open de Limoges	· 2019 →

The 2018 Open de Limoges was a professional tennis tournament, played on indoor hard courts. It was the 12th edition of the tournament and part of the 2018 WTA 125K series, offering a total of $125,000 in prize money. It took place in Limoges, France, from 5 to 11 November 2018.

== Singles main draw entrants ==
=== Seeds ===
Country	Player	Rank^{1}	Seed
ROU	Mihaela Buzărnescu	24	1
FRA	Alizé Cornet	46	2
FRA	Pauline Parmentier	54	3
ROU	Ana Bogdan	71	4
ROU	Monica Niculescu	77	5
GER	Tatjana Maria	78	6
RUS	Evgeniya Rodina	87	7
RUS	Ekaterina Alexandrova	92	8

- ^{1} Rankings as of 29 October 2018.

=== Other entrants ===
The following players received wildcards into the singles main draw:

- (Switzerland) Timea Bacsinszky
- (Romania) Mihaela Buzărnescu
- (France) Alizé Cornet
- (France) Chloé Paquet
- (France) Pauline Parmentier
- (Ukraine) Katarina Zavatska

The following players received entry using a protected ranking into the singles main draw:

- (Belarus) Olga Govortsova
- (Slovakia) Rebecca Šramková

The following players received entry from the qualifying draw:

- (France) Audrey Albié
- (Hungary) Gréta Arn
- (Russia) Marina Melnikova
- (Czech Republic) Renata Voráčová

The following players received entry into the main draw as a lucky loser:

- ~~(Slovakia) Jana Čepelová~~
- (Spain) Sílvia Soler Espinosa

=== Withdrawals ===
Before the tournament;

- (United Kingdom) Katie Boulter → replaced by (Romania) Alexandra Dulgheru
- (Serbia) Olga Danilović → replaced by (Spain) Sílvia Soler Espinosa
- (Russia) Vitalia Diatchenko → replaced by (United States) Jamie Loeb
- (Ukraine) Anhelina Kalinina → replaced by (Georgia (country)) Ekaterine Gorgodze
- (Ukraine) Marta Kostyuk → replaced by (Spain) Paula Badosa Gibert
- (Czech Republic) Kristýna Plíšková → replaced by (Belarus) Olga Govortsova
- (Czech Republic) Tereza Smitková → replaced by (Russia) Vera Zvonareva
- (Switzerland) Conny Perrin → replaced by (Slovakia) Rebecca Šramková
- (Germany) Carina Witthöft → replaced by (Bulgaria) Viktoriya Tomova

== Doubles entrants ==
=== Seeds ===
Country	Player	Country	Player	Rank^{1}	Seed
ROU	Mihaela Buzărnescu	ROU	Monica Niculescu	72	1
SUI	Timea Bacsinszky	RUS	Vera Zvonareva	146	2
RUS	Veronika Kudermetova	KAZ	Galina Voskoboeva	150	3
RUS	Anna Blinkova	RUS	Alexandra Panova	189	4

- ^{1} Rankings as of 29 October 2018.

== Champions ==
=== Singles ===
- (Russia) Ekaterina Alexandrova def. (Russia) Evgeniya Rodina, 6–2, 6–2

=== Doubles ===
- (Russia) Veronika Kudermetova / (Kazakhstan) Galina Voskoboeva def. (Switzerland) Timea Bacsinszky / (Russia) Vera Zvonareva 7–5, 6–4
