= 2019 Open de Limoges – Doubles =

Doubles
- 2019 Open de Limoges

Final
- Champions: (Spain) Georgina García Pérez (Spain) Sara Sorribes Tormo
- Runners-up: (Russia) Ekaterina Alexandrova (Georgia (country)) Oksana Kalashnikova
- Score: 6–2, 7–6^{(7–3)}

Events
Singles	Doubles
← 2018 ·	Open de Limoges	· 2021 →

Veronika Kudermetova and Galina Voskoboeva were the defending champions but chose not to participate.

Georgina García Pérez and Sara Sorribes Tormo won the title, defeating Ekaterina Alexandrova and Oksana Kalashnikova in the final 6–2, 7–6^{(7–3)}.

== Seeds ==
1. (Russia) Anna Blinkova / (Romania) Monica Niculescu (semifinals)
2. (Sweden) Cornelia Lister / (Czech Republic) Renata Voráčová (semifinals)
3. (Spain) Georgina García Pérez / (Spain) Sara Sorribes Tormo (champions)
4. (Russia) Ekaterina Alexandrova / (Georgia (country)) Oksana Kalashnikova (final)

== Draw ==
=== Key ===
- Q = Qualifier
- WC = Wild card
- LL = Lucky loser
- Alt = Alternate
- SE = Special exempt
- PR = Protected ranking
- ITF = ITF entry
- JE = Junior exempt
- w/o = Walkover
- r = Retired
- d = Defaulted
- SR = Special ranking

=== Draw ===
First round
1	(Russia) A Blinkova (Romania) M Niculescu	6	6
(Georgia (country)) S Shapatava (United Kingdom) E Webley-Smith	2	1
3	(Spain) G García Pérez (Spain) S Sorribes Tormo	6	7^{7}
(Brazil) L Pigossi (Slovenia) T Zidanšek	2	6^{5}
(Belgium) G Minnen (Belgium) A Van Uytvanck	3	6	[7]
4	(Russia) E Alexandrova (Georgia (country)) O Kalashnikova	6	3	[10]
WC	(France) A Hesse (France) C Paquet	6	2	[8]
2	(Sweden) C Lister (Czech Republic) R Voráčová	4	6	[10]

Semifinals
1	(Russia) A Blinkova (Romania) M Niculescu	6	2	[7]
3	(Spain) G García Pérez (Spain) S Sorribes Tormo	3	6	[10]
4	(Russia) E Alexandrova (Georgia (country)) O Kalashnikova	6	3	[16]
2	(Sweden) C Lister (Czech Republic) R Voráčová	4	6	[14]

Final
3	(Spain) G García Pérez (Spain) S Sorribes Tormo	6	7^{7}
4	(Russia) E Alexandrova (Georgia (country)) O Kalashnikova	2	6^{3}
