= 2019 Open de Limoges =

- Date: 16–22 December
- Edition: 13th
- Category: WTA 125K series
- Prize money: $125,000
- Surface: Hard (indoor)
- Location: Limoges, France

Champions

Singles
- (Russia) Ekaterina Alexandrova

Doubles
- (Spain) Georgina García Pérez / (Spain) Sara Sorribes Tormo
← 2018 ·	Open de Limoges	· 2021 →

The 2019 Open de Limoges was a professional tennis tournament played on indoor hard courts. It was the 13th edition of the tournament and part of the 2019 WTA 125K series, offering a total of $125,000 in prize money. It took place at the Palais des Sports de Beaublanc in Limoges, France, from 16 to 22 December 2019.

== Singles main draw entrants ==
=== Seeds ===
Country	Player	Rank^{1}	Seed
RUS	Ekaterina Alexandrova	42	1
FRA	Caroline Garcia	46	2
BEL	Alison Van Uytvanck	47	3
USA	Jennifer Brady	56	4
FRA	Alizé Cornet	59	5
RUS	Anna Blinkova	61	6
SLO	Tamara Zidanšek	63	7
USA	Bernarda Pera	65	8

- ^{1} Rankings as of 9 December 2019.

=== Other entrants ===
The following players received wildcards into the singles main draw:

- (Russia) Ekaterina Alexandrova
- (France) Clara Burel
- (France) Océane Dodin
- (France) Caroline Garcia
- (France) Chloé Paquet
- (Belgium) Alison Van Uytvanck

The following players received entry from the qualifying draw:

- (United States) Nicole Gibbs
- (France) Jessika Ponchet
- (Bulgaria) Isabella Shinikova
- (Belgium) Yanina Wickmayer

=== Withdrawals ===
Before the tournament

- (Romania) Patricia Maria Țig → replaced by (Russia) Liudmila Samsonova
- (United Kingdom) Heather Watson → replaced by (France) Pauline Parmentier

== Doubles entrants ==
=== Seeds ===
Country	Player	Country	Player	Rank^{1}	Seed
RUS	Anna Blinkova	ROU	Monica Niculescu	104	1
SWE	Cornelia Lister	CZE	Renata Voráčová	126	2
ESP	Georgina García Pérez	ESP	Sara Sorribes Tormo	161	3
RUS	Ekaterina Alexandrova	GEO	Oksana Kalashnikova	161	4

- ^{1} Rankings as of 9 December 2019.

=== Other entrants ===
The following team received a wildcard into the doubles main draw:

- (France) Amandine Hesse / (France) Chloé Paquet

== Champions ==
=== Singles ===
- (Russia) Ekaterina Alexandrova def. (Belarus) Aliaksandra Sasnovich 6–1, 6–3

=== Doubles ===
- (Spain) Georgina García Pérez / (Spain) Sara Sorribes Tormo vs. (Russia) Ekaterina Alexandrova / (Georgia (country)) Oksana Kalashnikova 6–2, 7–6^{(7–3)}
