= 2017 Open de Limoges – Singles =

Singles
- 2017 Open de Limoges

Final
- Champion: (Romania) Monica Niculescu
- Runner-up: (Germany) Antonia Lottner
- Score: 6–4, 6–2

Events
Singles	Doubles
← 2016 ·	Open de Limoges	· 2018 →

Ekaterina Alexandrova was the defending champion, but lost in the quarterfinals to Antonia Lottner.

Monica Niculescu won the title, defeating Lottner in the final 6–4, 6–2.

== Seeds ==
1. (France) Alizé Cornet (second round)
2. (Russia) Ekaterina Alexandrova (quarterfinals)
3. (France) Pauline Parmentier (semifinals)
4. (Croatia) Jana Fett (first round)
5. (Romania) Monica Niculescu (champion)
6. (Slovenia) Polona Hercog (withdrew)
7. (Estonia) Kaia Kanepi (quarterfinals)
8. (Slovakia) Jana Čepelová (second round, retired)
9. (Netherlands) Richèl Hogenkamp (first round)

== Draw ==
=== Key ===
- Q = Qualifier
- WC = Wild card
- LL = Lucky loser
- Alt = Alternate
- SE = Special exempt
- PR = Protected ranking
- ITF = ITF entry
- JE = Junior exempt
- w/o = Walkover
- r = Retired
- d = Defaulted
- SR = Special ranking

=== Finals ===
Semifinals
5	(Romania) Monica Niculescu	3	7	6
3	(France) Pauline Parmentier	6	5	2
WC	(Germany) Sabine Lisicki	6	2^{r}
(Germany) Antonia Lottner	3	5

Final
5	(Romania) Monica Niculescu	6	6
(Germany) Antonia Lottner	4	2

=== Top half ===
First round
1/WC	(France) A Cornet	6	7^{7}
(Montenegro) D Kovinić	1	6^{4}
(Russia) S Zhuk	4	1
(Russia) A Blinkova	6	6
Q	(Romania) E-G Ruse	6	6
(Slovakia) V Kužmová	2	2
(Romania) A Dulgheru	3	5
5	(Romania) M Niculescu	6	7
3	(France) P Parmentier	3	6	6
Q	(Spain) O Sáez Larra	6	2	4
(Turkey) B Eraydın	7	5	6
LL	(Venezuela) A Gámiz	5	7	3
WC	(France) C Paquet	5	3
WC	(France) J Ponchet	7	6
(Belgium) M Zanevska	1	3
7	(Estonia) K Kanepi	6	6

Second round
1/WC	(France) A Cornet	2	3
(Russia) A Blinkova	6	6
Q	(Romania) E-G Ruse	4	3
5	(Romania) M Niculescu	6	6
3	(France) P Parmentier	6	6
(Turkey) B Eraydın	2	4
WC	(France) J Ponchet	1	2
7	(Estonia) K Kanepi	6	6

Quarterfinals
(Russia) A Blinkova	2	1
5	(Romania) M Niculescu	6	6
3	(France) P Parmentier	6	6
7	(Estonia) K Kanepi	2	4

Semifinals
5	(Romania) M Niculescu	3	7	6
3	(France) P Parmentier	6	5	2

=== Bottom half ===
First round
9	(Netherlands) R Hogenkamp	5	6	6^{6}
WC	(Germany) S Lisicki	7	2	7^{8}
Q	(Chile) D Seguel	2	3
WC	(Serbia) O Danilović	6	6
(Russia) P Monova	6	6
(Romania) A Cadanțu	2	2
(Switzerland) C Perrin	6	6
4	(Croatia) J Fett	4	4
8	(Slovakia) J Čepelová	6	6
(Germany) T Korpatsch	2	3
(Bulgaria) V Tomova	3	2
(Germany) A Lottner	6	6
Q	(France) M Arcangioli	6^{1}	5
(Ukraine) A Kalinina	7^{7}	7
(United States) B Pera	0	4
2	(Russia) E Alexandrova	6	6

Second round
WC	(Germany) S Lisicki	7	7^{7}
WC	(Serbia) O Danilović	5	6^{1}
(Russia) P Monova	2	1
(Switzerland) C Perrin	6	6
8	(Slovakia) J Čepelová	6^{4}	0^{r}
(Germany) A Lottner	7^{7}	0
(Ukraine) A Kalinina	4	5
2	(Russia) E Alexandrova	6	7

Quarterfinals
WC	(Germany) S Lisicki	6^{4}	6	6
(Switzerland) C Perrin	7^{7}	3	1
(Germany) A Lottner	7^{7}	6
2	(Russia) E Alexandrova	6^{3}	1

Semifinals
WC	(Germany) S Lisicki	6	2^{r}
(Germany) A Lottner	3	5

== Qualifying ==
=== Seeds ===
1. (Chile) Daniela Seguel (qualified)
2. (France) Myrtille Georges (first round, retired)
3. (Italy) Deborah Chiesa (first round)
4. (Spain) Sílvia Soler Espinosa (first round)
5. (Czech Republic) Petra Krejsová (first round)
6. (Spain) Olga Sáez Larra (qualified)
7. (Venezuela) Andrea Gámiz (qualifying competition, lucky loser)
8. (France) Shérazad Reix (first round)

=== Qualifiers ===
1. (Chile) Daniela Seguel
2. (France) Manon Arcangioli
3. (Romania) Elena-Gabriela Ruse
4. (Spain) Olga Sáez Larra

=== Lucky loser ===
1. (Venezuela) Andrea Gámiz

=== Qualifying draw ===
==== First qualifier ====
First round
1	(Chile) Daniela Seguel	6	2	6
WC	(France) Marine Partaud	4	6	3
(France) Harmony Tan	6	6
5	(Czech Republic) Petra Krejsová	3	3

Qualifying competition
1	(Chile) Daniela Seguel	6	3	7^{7}
(France) Harmony Tan	4	6	6^{3}

==== Second qualifier ====
First round
2	(France) Myrtille Georges	1^{r}
(France) Manon Arcangioli	5
WC	(France) Fiona Codino	2	0
7	(Venezuela) Andrea Gámiz	6	6

Qualifying competition
(France) Manon Arcangioli	6	6
7	(Venezuela) Andrea Gámiz	4	3

==== Third qualifier ====
First round
3	(Italy) Deborah Chiesa	3	3
(Romania) Elena-Gabriela Ruse	6	6
(France) Tessah Andrianjafitrimo	6	6
8	(France) Shérazad Reix	4	2

Qualifying competition
(Romania) Elena-Gabriela Ruse	6	6
(France) Tessah Andrianjafitrimo	0	2

==== Fourth qualifier ====
First round
4	(Spain) Sílvia Soler Espinosa	3	7^{7}	4
(Japan) Mari Osaka	6	6^{3}	6
(Russia) Alla Kudryavtseva	6	3	4
6	(Spain) Olga Sáez Larra	4	6	6

Qualifying competition
(Japan) Mari Osaka	1	6	6^{1}
6	(Spain) Olga Sáez Larra	6	3	7^{7}
