= 2018 Open de Limoges – Singles =

Singles
- 2018 Open de Limoges

Final
- Champion: (Russia) Ekaterina Alexandrova
- Runner-up: (Russia) Evgeniya Rodina
- Score: 6–2, 6–2

Events
| Singles | Doubles |
| ← 2017 · | Open de Limoges | · 2019 → |

Monica Niculescu was the defending champion, but she lost in the second round to Margarita Gasparyan.

Ekaterina Alexandrova won the title after defeating Evgeniya Rodina 6–2, 6–2 in the final.

== Seeds ==
1. (Romania) Mihaela Buzărnescu (first round)
2. (France) Alizé Cornet (first round)
3. (France) Pauline Parmentier (quarterfinals)
4. (Romania) Ana Bogdan (quarterfinals)
5. (Romania) Monica Niculescu (second round)
6. (Germany) Tatjana Maria (quarterfinals)
7. (Russia) Evgeniya Rodina (final)
8. (Russia) Ekaterina Alexandrova (champion)

== Draw ==
=== Key ===
- Q = Qualifier
- WC = Wild card
- LL = Lucky loser
- Alt = Alternate
- SE = Special exempt
- PR = Protected ranking
- ITF = ITF entry
- JE = Junior exempt
- w/o = Walkover
- r = Retired
- d = Defaulted
- SR = Special ranking

=== Finals ===
Semifinals
(Russia) Margarita Gasparyan | 0^{r}
7 | (Russia) Evgeniya Rodina | 3
8 | (Russia) Ekaterina Alexandrova | 6 | 7
(Russia) Vera Zvonareva | 4 | 5

Final
7 | (Russia) Evgeniya Rodina | 2 | 2
8 | (Russia) Ekaterina Alexandrova | 6 | 6

=== Top half ===
First round
1/WC | (Romania) M Buzărnescu | 4 | 7 | 4
(Luxembourg) M Minella | 6 | 5 | 6
(Spain) P Badosa Gibert | 6 | 2 | 0
(Russia) A Blinkova | 4 | 6 | 6
(Russia) M Gasparyan | 6 | 6
Q | (Russia) M Melnikova | 3 | 3
(Bulgaria) V Tomova | 5 | 3
5 | (Romania) M Niculescu | 7 | 6
4 | (Romania) A Bogdan | 6 | 7
Q | (Hungary) G Arn | 2 | 5
(United States) J Loeb | 6 | 6
(Russia) N Vikhlyantseva | 2 | 4
(Russia) V Kudermetova | 5 | 6^{7}
Q | (France) A Albié | 7 | 7^{9}
(Georgia (country)) E Gorgodze | 1 | 2
7 | (Russia) E Rodina | 6 | 6

Second round
(Luxembourg) M Minella | 1 | 1
(Russia) A Blinkova | 6 | 6
(Russia) M Gasparyan | 6^{2} | 6 | 6
5 | (Romania) M Niculescu | 7^{7} | 2 | 3
4 | (Romania) A Bogdan | 6 | 7^{7}
(United States) J Loeb | 2 | 6^{4}
Q | (France) A Albié | 1 | 4
7 | (Russia) E Rodina | 6 | 6

Quarterfinals
(Russia) A Blinkova | 4 | 2
(Russia) M Gasparyan | 6 | 6
4 | (Romania) A Bogdan | 3 | 4
7 | (Russia) E Rodina | 6 | 6

Semifinals
(Russia) M Gasparyan | 0^{r}
7 | (Russia) E Rodina | 3

=== Bottom half ===
First round
8 | (Russia) E Alexandrova | 6 | 6^{3} | 6
PR | (Belarus) O Govortsova | 4 | 7^{7} | 2
(Romania) A Dulgheru | 7^{7} | 1 | 1
Q | (Czech Republic) R Voráčová | 6^{4} | 6 | 6
PR | (Slovakia) R Šramková | 6 | 5 | 2
(Germany) T Korpatsch | 2 | 7 | 6
(France) F Ferro | 5 | 2
3/WC | (France) P Parmentier | 7 | 6
6 | (Germany) T Maria | 6 | 6
WC | (France) C Paquet | 1 | 4
LL | (Spain) S Soler Espinosa | 5 | 6^{5}
WC | (Ukraine) K Zavatska | 7 | 7^{7}
(Spain) G García Pérez | 4 | 3
(Russia) V Zvonareva | 6 | 6
WC | (Switzerland) T Bacsinszky | 6 | 6
2/WC | (France) A Cornet | 2 | 2

Second round
8 | (Russia) E Alexandrova | 6 | 6
Q | (Czech Republic) R Voráčová | 4 | 3
(Germany) T Korpatsch | 2 | 3
3/WC | (France) P Parmentier | 6 | 6
6 | (Germany) T Maria | 6 | 5 | 6
WC | (Ukraine) K Zavatska | 2 | 7 | 2
(Russia) V Zvonareva | 6 | 6
WC | (Switzerland) T Bacsinszky | 3 | 2

Quarterfinals
8 | (Russia) E Alexandrova | 7 | 6
3/WC | (France) P Parmentier | 5 | 1
6 | (Germany) T Maria | 2 | 7^{7} | 4
(Russia) V Zvonareva | 6 | 6^{3} | 6

Semifinals
8 | (Russia) E Alexandrova | 6 | 7
(Russia) V Zvonareva | 4 | 5

== Qualifying ==
=== Seeds ===
1. (Spain) Sílvia Soler Espinosa (qualifying competition, lucky loser)
2. (Slovakia) Jana Čepelová (qualifying competition, ~~Lucky loser~~)
3. (Croatia) Tena Lukas (qualifying competition)
4. (Czech Republic) Jesika Malečková (qualifying competition)
5. (Russia) Marina Melnikova (qualified)
6. (France) Audrey Albié (qualified)
7. (Russia) Alexandra Panova (first round)
8. (Hungary) Gréta Arn (qualified)

=== Qualifiers ===
1. (France) Audrey Albié
2. (Hungary) Gréta Arn
3. (Czech Republic) Renata Voráčová
4. (Russia) Marina Melnikova

=== Lucky loser ===
1. ~~(Slovakia) Jana Čepelová~~
2. (Spain) Sílvia Soler Espinosa

=== Qualifying draw ===
==== First qualifier ====
First round
1 | (Spain) Sílvia Soler Espinosa | 6 | 3 | 6
(North Macedonia) Lina Gjorcheska | 1 | 6 | 0
WC | (France) Salma Djoubri | 4 | 2
6 | (France) Audrey Albié | 6 | 6

Qualifying competition
1 | (Spain) Sílvia Soler Espinosa | 6 | 4 | 4
6 | (France) Audrey Albié | 3 | 6 | 6

==== Second qualifier ====
First round
2 | (Slovakia) Jana Čepelová | 6 | 6
(France) Fiona Codino | 0 | 2
(Italy) Claudia Coppola | 0 | 4
8 | (Hungary) Gréta Arn | 6 | 6

Qualifying competition
2 | (Slovakia) Jana Čepelová | 6^{7} | 6 | 2
8 | (Hungary) Gréta Arn | 7^{9} | 0 | 6

==== Third qualifier ====
First round
3 | (Croatia) Tena Lukas | 6 | 6
PR | (Sweden) Susanne Celik | 4 | 2
(Czech Republic) Renata Voráčová | 7 | 4 | 6
7 | (Russia) Alexandra Panova | 5 | 6 | 4

Qualifying competition
3 | (Croatia) Tena Lukas | 2 | 7^{7} | 4
(Czech Republic) Renata Voráčová | 6 | 6^{2} | 6

==== Fourth qualifier ====
First round
4 | (Czech Republic) Jesika Malečková | 6 | 6
WC | (France) Lou Adler | 1 | 1
(Netherlands) Eva Wacanno | 2 | 4
5 | (Russia) Marina Melnikova | 6 | 6

Qualifying competition
4 | (Czech Republic) Jesika Malečková | 6 | 1 | 5
5 | (Russia) Marina Melnikova | 0 | 6 | 7
