= 2018 Open de Limoges – Doubles =

Doubles
- 2018 Open de Limoges

Final
- Champions: (Russia) Veronika Kudermetova (Kazakhstan) Galina Voskoboeva
- Runners-up: (Switzerland) Timea Bacsinszky (Russia) Vera Zvonareva
- Score: 7–5, 6–4

Events
Singles	Doubles
← 2017 ·	Open de Limoges	· 2019 →

Valeria Savinykh and Maryna Zanevska were the defending champions, but neither player chose to participate.

Veronika Kudermetova and Galina Voskoboeva won the title, defeating Timea Bacsinszky and Vera Zvonareva in the final 7–5, 6–4.

== Seeds ==
1. (Romania) Mihaela Buzărnescu / (Romania) Monica Niculescu (semifinals)
2. (Switzerland) Timea Bacsinszky / (Russia) Vera Zvonareva (final)
3. (Russia) Veronika Kudermetova / (Kazakhstan) Galina Voskoboeva (champions)
4. (Russia) Anna Blinkova / (Russia) Alexandra Panova (quarterfinals)

== Draw ==
=== Key ===
- Q = Qualifier
- WC = Wild card
- LL = Lucky loser
- Alt = Alternate
- SE = Special exempt
- PR = Protected ranking
- ITF = ITF entry
- JE = Junior exempt
- w/o = Walkover
- r = Retired
- d = Defaulted
- SR = Special ranking

Quarterfinals
1	(Romania) Mihaela Buzărnescu (Romania) Monica Niculescu	6	2	[10]
(Czech Republic) Petra Krejsová (Czech Republic) Jesika Malečková	4	6	[7]
3	(Russia) Veronika Kudermetova (Kazakhstan) Galina Voskoboeva	6	6
(Belarus) Olga Govortsova (Slovakia) Chantal Škamlová	2	2
(Spain) Georgina García Pérez (Czech Republic) Renata Voráčová	7^{8}	1	[12]
4	(Russia) Anna Blinkova (Russia) Alexandra Panova	6^{6}	6	[10]
(India) Prarthana Thombare (Netherlands) Eva Wacanno	4	2
2	(Switzerland) Timea Bacsinszky (Russia) Vera Zvonareva	6	6

Semifinals
1	(Romania) Mihaela Buzărnescu (Romania) Monica Niculescu	6	1	[4]
3	(Russia) Veronika Kudermetova (Kazakhstan) Galina Voskoboeva	4	6	[10]
(Spain) Georgina García Pérez (Czech Republic) Renata Voráčová	1	5
2	(Switzerland) Timea Bacsinszky (Russia) Vera Zvonareva	6	7

Final
3	(Russia) Veronika Kudermetova (Kazakhstan) Galina Voskoboeva	7	6
2	(Switzerland) Timea Bacsinszky (Russia) Vera Zvonareva	5	4
