= 2019 Open de Limoges – Singles =

Singles
- 2019 Open de Limoges

Final
- Champion: (Russia) Ekaterina Alexandrova
- Runner-up: (Belarus) Aliaksandra Sasnovich
- Score: 6–1, 6–3

Events
Singles	Doubles
← 2018 ·	Open de Limoges	· 2021 →

Ekaterina Alexandrova was the defending champion, and successfully defended her title, defeating Aliaksandra Sasnovich in the final 6–1, 6–3.

== Seeds ==
1. (Russia) Ekaterina Alexandrova (champion)
2. (France) Caroline Garcia (first round)
3. (Belgium) Alison Van Uytvanck (first round)
4. (United States) Jennifer Brady (second round)
5. (France) Alizé Cornet (second round)
6. (Russia) Anna Blinkova (second round)
7. (Slovenia) Tamara Zidanšek (first round)
8. (United States) Bernarda Pera (second round)

== Draw ==
=== Key ===
- Q = Qualifier
- WC = Wild card
- LL = Lucky loser
- Alt = Alternate
- SE = Special exempt
- PR = Protected ranking
- ITF = ITF entry
- JE = Junior exempt
- w/o = Walkover
- r = Retired
- d = Defaulted
- SR = Special ranking

=== Finals ===
Semifinals
1/WC	(Russia) Ekaterina Alexandrova	7^{8}	6
Q	(United States) Nicole Gibbs	6^{6}	2
(Belarus) Aliaksandra Sasnovich	2	6	6
(Belgium) Greet Minnen	6	2	2

Final
1/WC	(Russia) Ekaterina Alexandrova	6	6
(Belarus) Aliaksandra Sasnovich	1	3

=== Top half ===
First round
1/WC	(Russia) E Alexandrova	6	2	6
(Romania) M Niculescu	4	6	3
WC	(France) O Dodin	6	6
Q	(Belgium) Y Wickmayer	2	4
(Netherlands) A Rus	5	2
(Romania) A Bogdan	7	6
WC	(France) C Paquet	3	2
8	(United States) B Pera	6	6
3/WC	(Belgium) A Van Uytvanck	4	4
(Spain) S Sorribes Tormo	6	6
(Germany) T Maria	7	6^{3}	2
(Romania) S Cîrstea	5	7^{7}	6
(Ukraine) K Kozlova	5	5
Q	(France) J Ponchet	7	7
Q	(United States) N Gibbs	4	7^{7}	6
7	(Slovenia) T Zidanšek	6	6^{5}	3

Second round
1/WC	(Russia) E Alexandrova	6	6
WC	(France) O Dodin	3	4
(Romania) A Bogdan	6^{5}	6	6
8	(United States) B Pera	7^{7}	2	4
(Spain) S Sorribes Tormo	3	3
(Romania) S Cîrstea	6	6
Q	(France) J Ponchet	6	1	2
Q	(United States) N Gibbs	1	6	6

Quarterfinals
1/WC	(Russia) E Alexandrova	6	6
(Romania) A Bogdan	4	2
(Romania) S Cîrstea	6	3	0^{r}
Q	(United States) N Gibbs	3	6	0

Semifinals
1/WC	(Russia) E Alexandrova	7^{8}	6
Q	(United States) N Gibbs	6^{6}	2

=== Bottom half ===
First round
6	(Russia) A Blinkova	6	7
(Russia) N Vikhlyantseva	3	5
Q	(Bulgaria) I Shinikova	2	1
(Belarus) A Sasnovich	6	6
(Switzerland) J Teichmann	7^{7}	6
(Germany) T Korpatsch	6^{4}	3
(Estonia) K Kanepi	2	3
4	(United States) J Brady	6	6
5	(France) A Cornet	6	6
(Switzerland) S Vögele	2	1
(Italy) C Giorgi	4	6	4
(Russia) L Samsonova	6	4	6
(Belgium) G Minnen	6	6
WC	(France) C Burel	3	2
(France) P Parmentier	6	6
2/WC	(France) C Garcia	2	2

Second round
6	(Russia) A Blinkova	6	1	5
(Belarus) A Sasnovich	3	6	7
(Switzerland) J Teichmann	7	7^{14}
4	(United States) J Brady	5	6^{12}
5	(France) A Cornet	4	6	3
(Russia) L Samsonova	6	3	6
(Belgium) G Minnen	6	7
(France) P Parmentier	3	5

Quarterfinals
(Belarus) A Sasnovich	6	7
(Switzerland) J Teichmann	3	5
(Russia) L Samsonova	5	2
(Belgium) G Minnen	7	6

Semifinals
(Belarus) A Sasnovich	2	6	6
(Belgium) G Minnen	6	2	2

== Qualifying ==
=== Seeds ===
1. (Russia) Liudmila Samsonova (moved to main draw)
2. (United States) Nicole Gibbs (qualified)
3. (Belgium) Yanina Wickmayer (qualified)
4. (Bulgaria) Isabella Shinikova (qualified)

=== Qualifiers ===
1. (France) Jessika Ponchet
2. (United States) Nicole Gibbs
3. (Belgium) Yanina Wickmayer
4. (Bulgaria) Isabella Shinikova

=== Qualifying draw ===
==== First qualifier ====
Qualifying competition
	(France) Jessika Ponchet	7	6
WC	(France) Amandine Hesse	5	3

==== Second qualifier ====
Qualifying competition
2	(United States) Nicole Gibbs	6	3	6
	(Russia) Marina Melnikova	4	6	2

==== Third qualifier ====
Qualifying competition
3	(Belgium) Yanina Wickmayer	6	6
	(Spain) Cristina Bucșa	1	4

==== Fourth qualifier ====
Qualifying competition
4	(Bulgaria) Isabella Shinikova	6	7^{10}
WC	(France) Tessah Andrianjafitrimo	4	6^{8}
