= 2017 Open de Limoges – Doubles =

Doubles
- 2017 Open de Limoges

Final
- Champion: (Russia) Valeria Savinykh (Belgium) Maryna Zanevska
- Runner-up: (France) Chloé Paquet (France) Pauline Parmentier
- Score: 6–0, 6–2

Events
Singles	Doubles
← 2016 ·	Open de Limoges	· 2018 →

Elise Mertens and Mandy Minella were the defending champions, but neither player chose to participate.

Valeria Savinykh and Maryna Zanevska won the title, defeating Chloé Paquet and Pauline Parmentier in the final 6–0, 6–2.

== Seeds ==
1. (Russia) Natela Dzalamidze / (Switzerland) Xenia Knoll (first round)
2. (Romania) Alexandra Cadanțu / (Romania) Monica Niculescu (semifinals, withdrew)
3. (Netherlands) Michaëlla Krajicek / (Russia) Alla Kudryavtseva (semifinals)
4. (Russia) Valeria Savinykh / (Belgium) Maryna Zanevska (champions)

== Draw ==
=== Key ===
- Q = Qualifier
- WC = Wild card
- LL = Lucky loser
- Alt = Alternate
- SE = Special exempt
- PR = Protected ranking
- ITF = ITF entry
- JE = Junior exempt
- w/o = Walkover
- r = Retired
- d = Defaulted
- SR = Special ranking

First round
1	(Russia) N Dzalamidze (Switzerland) X Knoll	3	7	[5]
WC	(France) C Paquet (France) P Parmentier	6	5	[10]
3	(Netherlands) M Krajicek (Russia) A Kudryavtseva	6	6
(United Kingdom) T Moore (Switzerland) C Perrin	3	4
(Sweden) C Lister (Romania) E-G Ruse	6	5	[14]
4	(Russia) V Savinykh (Belgium) M Zanevska	2	7	[16]
(France) M Arcangioli (France) S Reix	3	1
2	(Romania) A Cadanțu (Romania) M Niculescu	6	6

Semifinals
WC	(France) C Paquet (France) P Parmentier	1	6	[10]
3	(Netherlands) M Krajicek (Russia) A Kudryavtseva	6	0	[7]
4	(Russia) V Savinykh (Belgium) M Zanevska	w/o
2	(Romania) A Cadanțu (Romania) M Niculescu

Final
WC	(France) C Paquet (France) P Parmentier	0	2
4	(Russia) V Savinykh (Belgium) M Zanevska	6	6
