= 2025 Porsche Tennis Grand Prix – Singles =

Singles
- 2025 Porsche Tennis Grand Prix

Final
- Champion: (Latvia) Jeļena Ostapenko
- Runner-up: Aryna Sabalenka
- Score: 6–4, 6–1

Details
- Draw: 28 (4WC, 4Q)
- Seeds: 8

Events
Singles	Doubles
- Porsche Tennis Grand Prix

Jeļena Ostapenko defeated Aryna Sabalenka in the final, 6–4, 6–1 to win the title at the 2025 Stuttgart Open. It was her ninth WTA Tour singles title, and her first singles final and title on clay since the 2017 French Open. She became the first unseeded champion at the tournament since Laura Siegemund in 2017. Sabalenka has been the runner-up of four out of the last five editions of the tournament.

En route to the title, Ostapenko defeated the top two ranked players in the world. She ran her head-to-head record against Iga Świątek to six in a row with no loss to the Pole, having defeated her on every surface during six years while her win against Sabalenka was the first one in four meetings in the timespan of six years too.

Elena Rybakina was the reigning champion, but chose not to participate this year.

== Seeds ==
The top four seeds received a bye into the second round.

1. Aryna Sabalenka (final)
2. (Poland) Iga Świątek (quarterfinals)
3. (United States) Jessica Pegula (quarterfinals)
4. (United States) Coco Gauff (quarterfinals)
5. (Italy) Jasmine Paolini (semifinals)
6. Mirra Andreeva (second round)
7. (United States) Emma Navarro (second round)
8. Diana Shnaider (second round)

== Draw ==
Key

- Q = Qualifier
- WC = Wild card
- LL = Lucky loser
- Alt = Alternate
- ITF = ITF entry
- PR = Protected ranking
- SR = Special ranking
- SE = Special exempt
- JE = Junior exempt
- JR = Junior Accelerator Programme entrant
- CO = College Accelerator Programme entrant
- NG = Next Gen Accelerator Program entrant
- w/o = Walkover
- r = Retired
- d = Defaulted

=== Finals ===
Semifinals
1	Aryna Sabalenka	7	6
5	(Italy) Jasmine Paolini	5	4
Ekaterina Alexandrova	4	4
(Latvia) Jeļena Ostapenko	6	6

Final
1	Aryna Sabalenka	4	1
(Latvia) Jeļena Ostapenko	6	6

=== Top half ===
First round
A Potapova	2	7^{10}	6
(Denmark) C Tauson	6	6^{8}	3
Q	A Sasnovich	6^{3}	2
(Belgium) E Mertens	7^{7}	6
Q	V Kudermetova	7	2	3
8	D Shnaider	5	6	6
WC	(Germany) T Maria	6	6^{2}	4
LL	(Germany) E Seidel	3	7^{7}	6
WC	(Germany) J Niemeier	4	6	6
WC	(Germany) L Siegemund	6	3	4
WC	(Germany) E Lys	2	1
5	(Italy) J Paolini	6	6

Second round
1	A Sabalenka	w/o
A Potapova
(Belgium) E Mertens	6	7^{7}
8	D Shnaider	2	6^{5}
4	(United States) C Gauff	6	6
LL	(Germany) E Seidel	1	1
WC	(Germany) J Niemeier	1	5
5	(Italy) J Paolini	6	7

Quarterfinals
1	A Sabalenka	6	6
(Belgium) E Mertens	4	1
4	(United States) C Gauff	4	3
5	(Italy) J Paolini	6	6

Semifinals
1	A Sabalenka	7	6
5	(Italy) J Paolini	5	4

=== Bottom half ===
First round
6	M Andreeva	6	1
LL	E Andreeva	2	0^{r}
E Alexandrova	6	6
L Samsonova	3	3
(Poland) M Fręch	7	4	7^{7}
LL	(Italy) S Errani	5	6	6^{5}
7	(United States) E Navarro	6	6
(Brazil) B Haddad Maia	3	0
(Latvia) J Ostapenko	6	3
Q	(Ukraine) D Yastremska	3	0^{r}
(Croatia) D Vekić	6^{2}	4
Q	(Croatia) J Fett	7^{7}	6

Second round
6	M Andreeva	3	2
E Alexandrova	6	6
(Poland) M Fręch	1	1
3	(United States) J Pegula	6	6
7	(United States) E Navarro	5	6	2
(Latvia) J Ostapenko	7	3	6
Q	(Croatia) J Fett	2	2
2	(Poland) I Świątek	6	6

Quarterfinals
E Alexandrova	6	6
3	(United States) J Pegula	0	4
(Latvia) J Ostapenko	6	3	6
2	(Poland) I Świątek	3	6	2

Semifinals
E Alexandrova	4	4
(Latvia) J Ostapenko	6	6

== Qualifying ==
=== Seeds ===
1. (Ukraine) Dayana Yastremska (qualified)
2. Veronika Kudermetova (qualified)
3. Erika Andreeva (qualifying competition, lucky loser)
4. (Ukraine) Yuliia Starodubtseva (first round)
5. Aliaksandra Sasnovich (qualified)
6. (Germany) Ella Seidel (qualifying competition, lucky loser)
7. Anastasia Zakharova (withdrew)
8. (Italy) Sara Errani (qualifying competition, lucky loser)

=== Qualifiers ===
1. (Ukraine) Dayana Yastremska
2. Veronika Kudermetova
3. Aliaksandra Sasnovich
4. (Croatia) Jana Fett

=== Lucky losers ===
1. (Germany) Ella Seidel
2. Erika Andreeva
3. (Italy) Sara Errani

=== Qualifying draw ===
==== First qualifier ====
First round
1	(Ukraine) Dayana Yastremska	6	6
PR	(Croatia) Ana Konjuh	1	4
PR	(Belgium) Yanina Wickmayer	1	4
6	(Germany) Ella Seidel	6	6

Qualifying competition
1	(Ukraine) Dayana Yastremska	6	6
6	(Germany) Ella Seidel	3	4

==== Second qualifier ====
First round
2	Veronika Kudermetova	6	6
(Liechtenstein) Kathinka von Deichmann	3	2
WC	(Germany) Nastasja Schunk	6	4	3
8	(Italy) Sara Errani	2	6	6

Qualifying competition
2	Veronika Kudermetova	6	6
8	(Italy) Sara Errani	1	2

==== Third qualifier ====
First round
3	Erika Andreeva	6	6
WC	(Germany) Mariella Thamm	3	4
(United States) Louisa Chirico	0	4
5	Aliaksandra Sasnovich	6	6

Qualifying competition
3	Erika Andreeva	1	4
5	Aliaksandra Sasnovich	6	6

==== Fourth qualifier ====
First round
4	(Ukraine) Yuliia Starodubtseva	6^{4}	3
(Croatia) Jana Fett	7^{7}	6
(Switzerland) Rebeka Masarova	6	6
Alt	(China) Zhang Shuai	2	1

Qualifying competition
(Croatia) Jana Fett	6^{5}	7^{7}	7^{7}
(Switzerland) Rebeka Masarova	7^{7}	6^{4}	6^{5}
