= 2025 Porsche Tennis Grand Prix – Doubles =

Doubles
- 2025 Porsche Tennis Grand Prix

Final
- Champions: (Canada) Gabriela Dabrowski (New Zealand) Erin Routliffe
- Runners-up: Ekaterina Alexandrova (China) Zhang Shuai
- Score: 6–3, 6–3

Details
- Draw: 16
- Seeds: 4

Events
Singles	Doubles
- Porsche Tennis Grand Prix

Gabriela Dabrowski and Erin Routliffe defeated Ekaterina Alexandrova and Zhang Shuai in the final, 6–3, 6–3 to win the doubles tennis title at the 2025 Porsche Tennis Grand Prix.

Chan Hao-ching and Veronika Kudermetova were the defending champions, but lost in the first round to Tímea Babos and Luisa Stefani.

== Seeds ==
The top two seeds received a bye into the second round.

1. (Canada) Gabriela Dabrowski / (New Zealand) Erin Routliffe (champions)
2. (Italy) Sara Errani / (Italy) Jasmine Paolini (quarterfinals)
3. (Chinese Taipei) Chan Hao-ching / Veronika Kudermetova (first round)
4. (United States) Asia Muhammad / (Netherlands) Demi Schuurs (quarterfinals)

== Draw ==
Key

- Q = Qualifier
- WC = Wild card
- LL = Lucky loser
- Alt = Alternate
- ITF = ITF entry
- PR = Protected ranking
- SR = Special ranking
- SE = Special exempt
- JE = Junior exempt
- JR = Junior Accelerator Programme entrant
- CO = College Accelerator Programme entrant
- NG = Next Gen Accelerator Program entrant
- w/o = Walkover
- r = Retired
- d = Defaulted

=== Draw ===
First round
(Ukraine) N Kichenok (China) Y Xu	6	1	[5]
A Panova (Hungary) F Stollár	4	6	[10]
3	(Chinese Taipei) H-c Chan; V Kudermetova	2	6	[5]
(Hungary) T Babos (Brazil) L Stefani	6	3	[10]
(Latvia) J Ostapenko (Ukraine) D Yastremska	7^{7}	6
(Germany) N Schunk (Germany) E Seidel	6^{3}	1
(United States) D Krawczyk (United States) J Pegula	0	7^{7}	[3]
(United States) N Melichar-Martinez; L Samsonova	6	6^{3}	[10]
(Norway) U Eikeri (Romania) M Niculescu	3	1
4	(United States) A Muhammad (Netherlands) D Schuurs	6	6
E Alexandrova (China) S Zhang	6	6
(Japan) M Kato (Indonesia) A Sutjiadi	3	2

Quarterfinals
1	(Canada) G Dabrowski (New Zealand) E Routliffe	6	6
A Panova (Hungary) F Stollár	4	2
(Hungary) T Babos (Brazil) L Stefani	7^{7}	5	[11]
(Latvia) J Ostapenko (Ukraine) D Yastremska	6^{1}	7	[9]
(United States) N Melichar-Martinez; L Samsonova	6	6
4	(United States) A Muhammad (Netherlands) D Schuurs	1	1
E Alexandrova (China) S Zhang	6	2	[10]
2	(Italy) S Errani (Italy) J Paolini	2	6	[8]

Semifinals
1	(Canada) G Dabrowski (New Zealand) E Routliffe	5	6	[10]
(Hungary) T Babos (Brazil) L Stefani	7	3	[4]
(United States) N Melichar-Martinez; L Samsonova	4	6	[11]
E Alexandrova (China) S Zhang	6	4	[13]

Final
1	(Canada) G Dabrowski (New Zealand) E Routliffe	6	6
E Alexandrova (China) S Zhang	3	3
