= Galina Voskoboeva =

Russian-born Kazakhstani tennis player (born 1984)

Galina Voskoboeva Галина Воскобоева
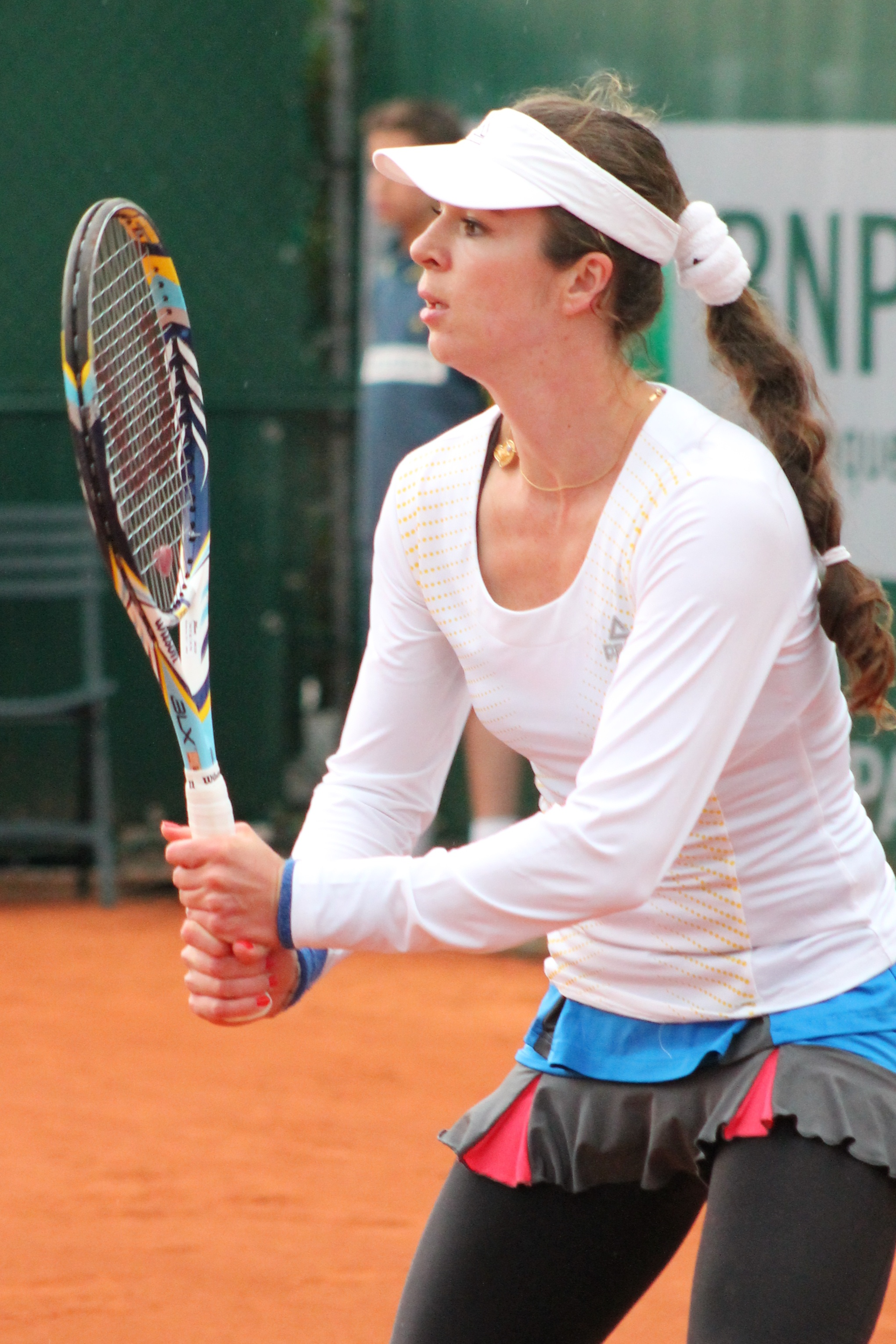
- Voskoboeva at the 2013 French Open
- Country (sports): Russia (until 2008); Kazakhstan (2008–present)
- Residence: Astana, Kazakhstan
- Born: 18 December 1984 (age 41) Moscow, Russian SFSR, Soviet Union
- Height: 1.83 m (6 ft 0 in)
- Turned pro: 2002
- Retired: 2019 (in singles)
- Plays: Right (two-handed backhand)
- Prize money: $2,544,232

Singles
- Career record: 373–313
- Career titles: 0 WTA, 3 ITF
- Highest ranking: No. 42 (7 May 2012)

Grand Slam singles results
- Australian Open: 3R (2009, 2012)
- French Open: 2R (2008, 2009, 2013)
- Wimbledon: 2R (2012)
- US Open: 2R (2012, 2013)

Other tournaments
- Olympic Games: 1R (2012)

Doubles
- Career record: 339–271
- Career titles: 5 WTA, 1 WTA Challenger
- Highest ranking: No. 26 (20 August 2012)

Grand Slam doubles results
- Australian Open: QF (2007, 2012)
- French Open: QF (2008, 2013)
- Wimbledon: 3R (2012)
- US Open: 3R (2006, 2011, 2013)

Other doubles tournaments
- Olympic Games: 2R (2012)

Grand Slam mixed doubles results
- Wimbledon: 1R (2021)
- US Open: 2R (2012, 2021)

Team competitions
- Fed Cup: 28–15

Galina Olegovna Voskoboeva (Russian: Галина Олеговна Воскобоева; born 18 December 1984) is a Russian-born Kazakhstani inactive tennis player. She reached career-high rankings of world No. 42 in singles and No. 26 in doubles. She won five doubles titles on the WTA Tour, as well as one doubles title on the WTA Challenger Tour. She also won three singles titles and 13 doubles titles on the ITF Circuit.

== Career ==
Voskoboeva turned professional in 2002.

=== 2008–2009 ===
In 2008, Voskoboeva managed to qualify for the Qatar Ladies Open in Doha. In the first round she defeated Eleni Daniilidou, before taking a set off world No. 5, Maria Sharapova finally losing 4–6, 6–4, 1–6. That same year, she reached the quarterfinals in Quebec City.

In 2009, she reached the quarterfinals in Warsaw. At the US Open, she lost in the first round to Caroline Wozniacki, in straight sets.

=== 2011 ===
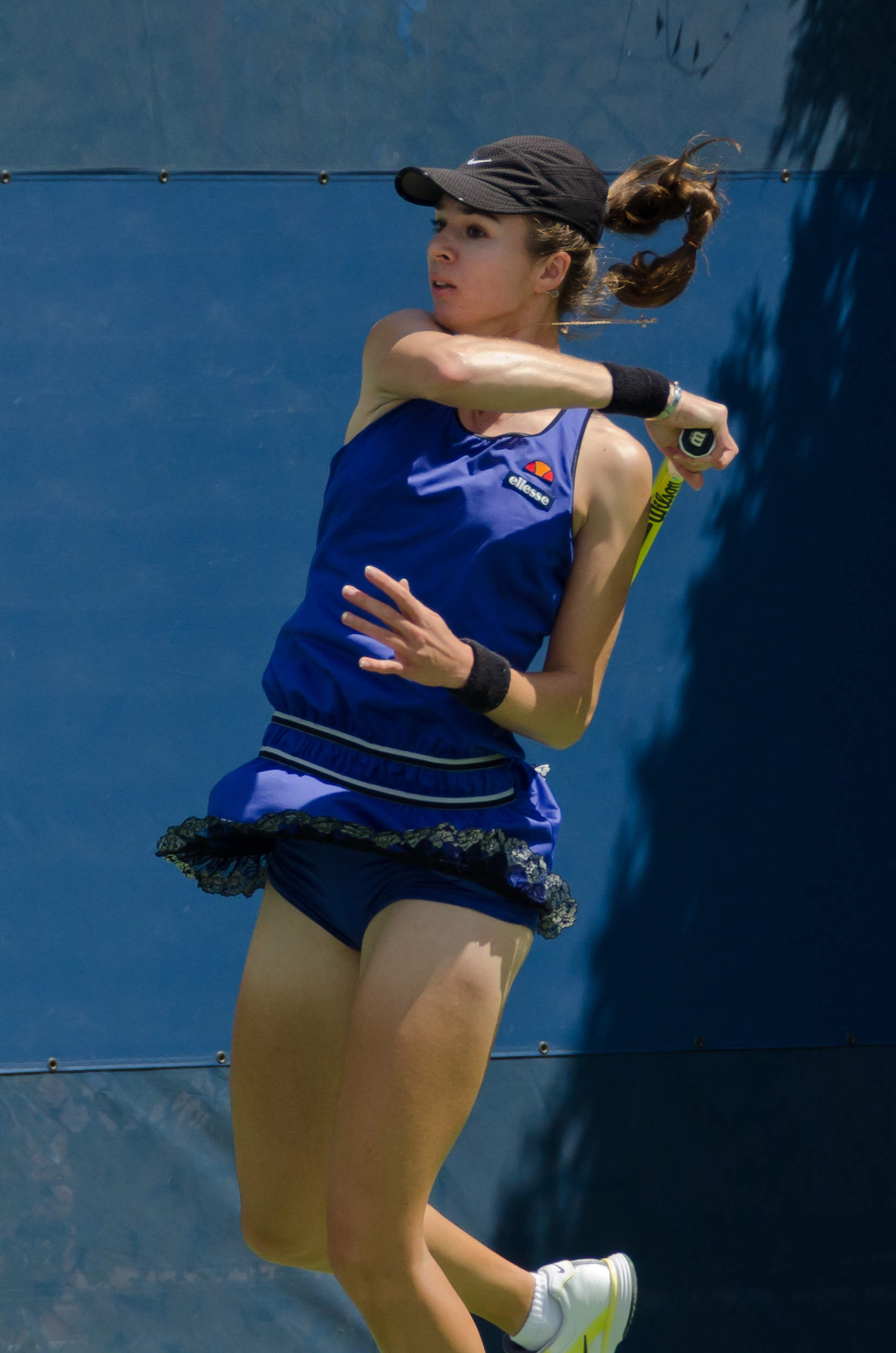
Voskoboeva returns a shot in the 2011 US Open qualifying

Ranked 560 in the world, Galina reached the quarterfinals of the Pattaya Open. Due to her ranking, she had to qualify, and did so by defeating top seed Sania Mirza, and No. 7 seed Lindsay Lee-Waters in the qualifying tournament. In the first round of the main draw, she defeated Romina Oprandi, before defeating third seed Maria Kirilenko in a close match 1–6, 7–5, 6–4.

She qualified for the Miami Open and upset No. 7 seed Jelena Dokic, in the first round.

At the Baku Cup Voskoboeva lost to Ksenia Pervak in the semifinals. In doubles, Voskoboeva and Niculescu were the first seeds. They advanced to the finals by defeating Daniela Dominikovic and Noppawan Lertcheewakarn, but lost to second seeds Mariya Koryttseva and Tatiana Poutchek.

After qualifying for the Premier-level Canadian Open in Toronto, Voskoboeva recorded the biggest win of her career by defeating French Open-semifinalist and world No. 9, Marion Bartoli, in the first round. She followed this up with a win against world No. 25, Flavia Pennetta, to reach the third round. She followed this by beating former world No. 1, Maria Sharapova, in two sets but lost to fourth-seeded Victoria Azarenka in the quarterfinals.

Voskoboeva qualified for the US Open but lost to seventh seed Francesca Schiavone in the first round.

=== 2012 ===
As of 2012, Voskoboeva has paired with fellow Kazakh player Yaroslava Shvedova in doubles, in an effort to represent their nation at the Summer Olympics in London, a feat they achieved reaching the second round.

=== 2013 ===
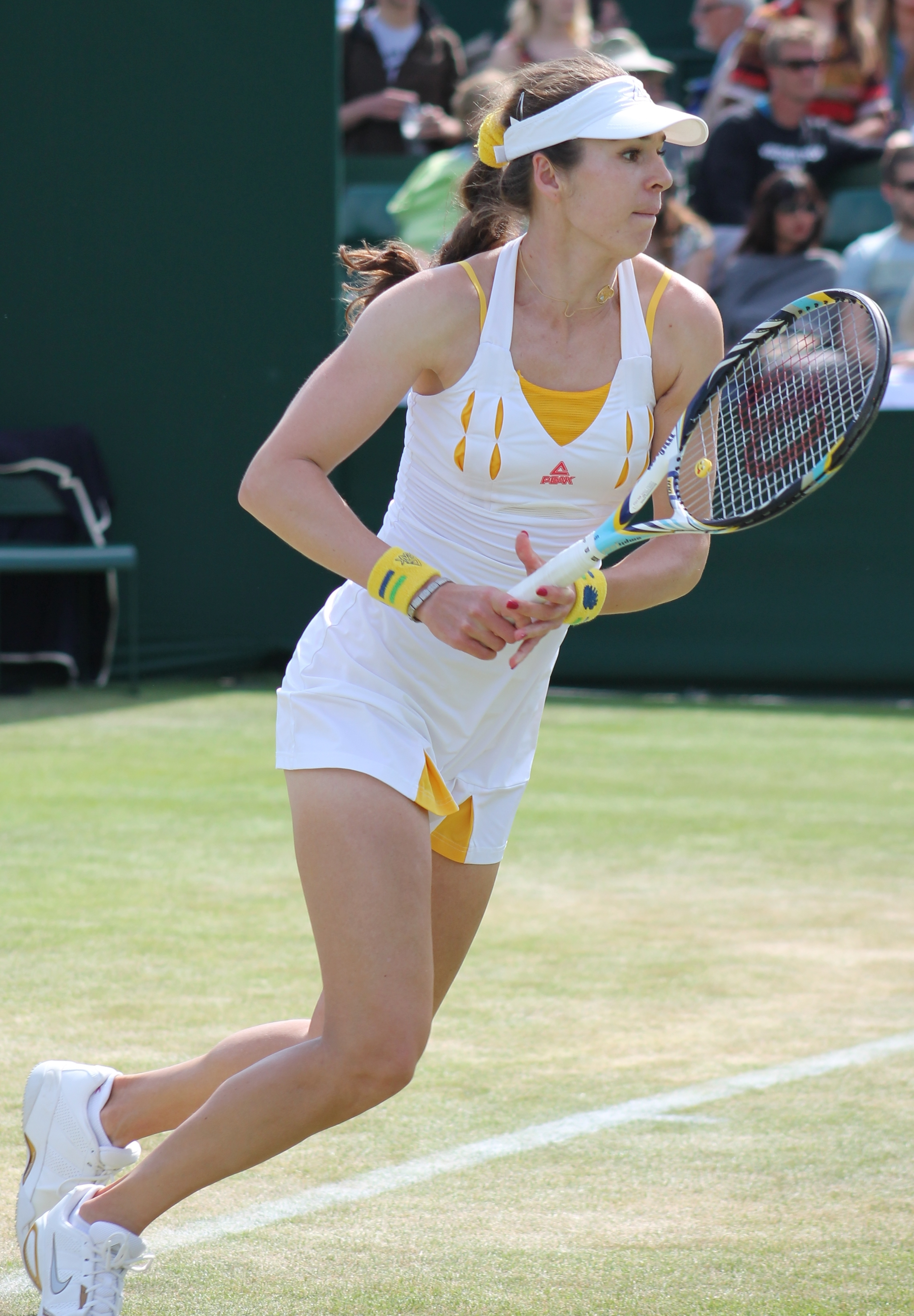
Voskoboeva at the 2013 Wimbledon Championships

Voskoboeva began her 2013 season at the Auckland Open. She lost in the first round to Kirsten Flipkens. Coming through the qualifying rounds at the Sydney International, Voskoboeva defeated Yanina Wickmayer in the first round. She was defeated in the second round by second seed Angelique Kerber. At the Australian Open, Voskoboeva lost in the first round to 25th seed Venus Williams.

In Memphis, at the National Indoor Championships, Voskoboeva was defeated in the first round by fourth seed Heather Watson.

== Personal life ==
In 2008, Voskoboeva changed her nationality from Russian to Kazakhstani. She attended University RUPF in Moscow, where she graduated from in 2005. On 15 April 2021, she married Jonathan Gully, a physician, at the Cathedral Basilica of Saint Peter in Chains, in Cincinnati, Ohio.

== Grand Slam performance timelines ==
Key
W	F	SF	QF	#R	RR	Q#	DNQ	A	NH

(W) winner; (F) finalist; (SF) semifinalist; (QF) quarterfinalist; (#R) rounds 4, 3, 2, 1; (RR) round-robin stage; (Q#) qualification round; (DNQ) did not qualify; (A) absent; (NH) not held; (SR) strike rate (events won / competed); (W–L) win–loss record.
To avoid confusion and double counting, these charts are updated at the conclusion of a tournament or when the player's participation has ended.

=== Singles ===
Tournament	2002	2003	2004	2005	2006	2007	2008	2009	2010	2011	2012	2013	2014	2015	2016	2017	W–L
Australian Open	A	A	Q2	Q3	2R	1R	Q2	3R	1R	A	3R	1R	2R	A	A	1R	6–8
French Open	A	A	Q1	Q3	1R	Q2	2R	2R	Q1	A	1R	2R	A	A	1R	A	3–6
Wimbledon	A	Q1	Q2	Q1	Q3	Q1	1R	1R	A	Q3	2R	1R	A	A	A	A	1–4
US Open	A	A	Q2	Q2	1R	Q2	1R	1R	A	1R	2R	2R	A	A	A	A	2–6
Win–loss	0–0	0–0	0–0	0–1	1–3	0–1	2–4	3–4	0–1	0–1	4–4	2–4	1–1	0–0	0–1	0–1	12–24

=== Doubles ===
Tournament	2004	2005	2006	2007	2008	2009	2010	2011	2012	2013	2014	2015	2016	2017	2018	2019	2020	2021	W–L
Australian Open	A	1R	1R	QF	3R	3R	2R	A	2R	2R	2R	A	A	2R	A	1R	NH	A	12–11
French Open	A	2R	1R	1R	QF	1R	1R	2R	2R	QF	A	A	2R	A	A	1R	NH	A	10–11
Wimbledon	2R	1R	2R	1R	1R	2R	A	2R	3R	2R	A	A	A	A	Q1	2R	NH	1R	8–11
US Open	2R	1R	3R	2R	2R	1R	A	3R	2R	3R	A	A	A	A	1R	1R	A	1R	10–12
Win–loss	2–2	1–4	3–4	4–4	6–4	4–3	1–2	3–4	5–4	7–4	1–1	0–0	1–1	1–1	0–1	1–4	0–0	0–2	40–45

== Significant finals ==
=== WTA 1000 tournaments ===
==== Doubles: 1 (runner-up) ====
Result	Year	Tournament	Surface	Partner	Opponents	Score
Loss	2006	Kremlin Cup	Carpet (i)	(Czech Republic) Iveta Benešová	(Italy) Francesca Schiavone (Czech Republic) Květa Peschke	4–6, 7–6^{(4)}, 1–6

== WTA Tour finals ==
=== Singles: 1 (runner-up) ===
Legend WTA 250 (0–1)	Finals by surface Hard (0–1)

Result	Date	Tournament	Tier	Surface	Opponent	Score
Loss	Sep 2011	Korea Open, South Korea	International (Note: In 2009, the WTA Tier II tournaments were reclassified as WTA Premier tournaments, while the WTA Tier III tournaments, WTA Tier IV tournaments and WTA Tier V tournaments were reclassified as WTA International tournaments. In 2021, the WTA Premier tournaments were reclassified as WTA 500 tournaments and WTA International tournaments as WTA 250 tournaments.)	Hard	(Spain) María José Martínez Sánchez	6–7^{(0)}, 6–7^{(2)}

=== Doubles: 18 (5 titles, 13 runner-ups) ===
Legend WTA 1000 (0–1) WTA 500 (1–2) WTA 250 (4–10)	Finals by surface Hard (3–8) Clay (2–4) Carpet (0–1)

Result	W–L	Date	Tournament	Tier	Surface	Partner	Opponents	Score
Loss	0–1	Oct 2005	Tashkent Open, Uzbekistan	Tier IV	Hard	(Australia) Anastasia Rodionova	(Italy) Maria Elena Camerin (France) Émilie Loit	3–6, 0–6
Loss	0–2	Oct 2006	Kremlin Cup, Russia	Tier I (Note: THe WTA Tier I tournaments were reclassified as Premier Mandatory & Premier 5 in 2009 and later as WTA 1000 tournaments in 2021.)	Carpet (i)	(Czech Republic) Iveta Benešová	(Italy) Francesca Schiavone (Czech Republic) Květa Peschke	4–6, 7–6^{(7–4)}, 1–6
Loss	0–3	Jan 2007	Australian Hardcourts, Australia	Tier III	Hard	(Czech Republic) Iveta Benešová	(Russia) Dinara Safina (Slovenia) Katarina Srebotnik	3–6, 4–6
Win	1–3	Mar 2011	Malaysian Open, Malaysia	International	Hard	(Russia) Dinara Safina	(Thailand) Noppawan Lertcheewakarn (Australia) Jessica Moore	7–5, 2–6, [10–5]
Win	2–3	Apr 2011	Estoril Open, Portugal	International	Clay	(Russia) Alisa Kleybanova	(Netherlands) Michaëlla Krajicek (Greece) Eleni Daniilidou	6–4, 6–2
Win	3–3	May 2011	Brussels Open, Belgium	Premier	Clay	(Czech Republic) Andrea Hlaváčková	(Poland) Klaudia Jans (Poland) Alicja Rosolska	3–6, 6–0, [10–5]
Loss	3–4	Jul 2011	Baku Cup, Azerbaijan	International	Hard	(Romania) Monica Niculescu	(Ukraine) Mariya Koryttseva (Belarus) Tatiana Poutchek	3–6, 6–2, [8–10]
Loss	3–5	Sep 2011	Korea Open, Seoul	International	Hard	(Russia) Vera Dushevina	(South Africa) Natalie Grandin (Czech Republic) Vladimíra Uhlířová	6–7^{(5–7)}, 4–6
Loss	3–6	Oct 2011	Kremlin Cup, Russia	Premier	Hard (i)	(Australia) Anastasia Rodionova	(United States) Vania King (Kazakhstan) Yaroslava Shvedova	6–7^{(3–7)}, 3–6
Loss	3–7	May 2012	Estoril Open, Portugal	International	Clay	(Kazakhstan) Yaroslava Shvedova	(Chinese Taipei) Chuang Chia-jung (China) Zhang Shuai	6–4, 1–6, [9–11]
Win	4–7	Feb 2013	U.S. National Indoors	International	Hard (i)	(France) Kristina Mladenovic	(Sweden) Sofia Arvidsson (Sweden) Johanna Larsson	7–6^{(7–5)}, 6–3
Loss	4–8	Sep 2013	Guangzhou Open, China	International	Hard	(United States) Vania King	(Chinese Taipei) Hsieh Su-wei (China) Peng Shuai	3–6, 6–4, [10–12]
Loss	4–9	Jan 2014	Brisbane International, Australia	Premier	Hard	(France) Kristina Mladenovic	(Russia) Alla Kudryavtseva (Australia) Anastasia Rodionova	3–6, 1–6
Win	5–9	Mar 2014	Mexican Open	International	Hard	(France) Kristina Mladenovic	(Czech Republic) Petra Cetkovská (Czech Republic) Iveta Melzer	6–3, 2–6, [10–5]
Loss	5–10	Feb 2017	Hungarian Ladies Open	International	Hard (i)	(Australia) Arina Rodionova	(Chinese Taipei) Hsieh Su-wei (Georgia (country)) Oksana Kalashnikova	3–6, 6–4, [4–10]
Loss	5–11	Jul 2018	Moscow River Cup, Russia	International	Clay	(Russia) Alexandra Panova	(Russia) Anastasia Potapova (Russia) Vera Zvonareva	0–6, 3–6
Loss	5–12	Apr 2019	Ladies Open Lugano, Switzerland	International	Clay	(Russia) Veronika Kudermetova	(Romania) Sorana Cîrstea (Romania) Andreea Mitu	6–1, 2–6, [8–10]
Loss	5–13	Jul 2019	Baltic Open, Latvia	International	Clay	(Latvia) Jeļena Ostapenko	(Canada) Sharon Fichman (Serbia) Nina Stojanović	6–2, 6–7^{(1–7)}, [6–10]

== WTA 125 finals ==
=== Doubles: 1 (title) ===
Result	W–L	Date	Tournament	Surface	Partner	Opponents	Score
Win	1–0	Nov 2018	Open de Limoges, France	Hard (i)	(Russia) Veronika Kudermetova	(Switzerland) Timea Bacsinszky (Russia) Vera Zvonareva	7–5, 6–4

== ITF Circuit finals ==
Legend
$100,000 tournaments
$75,000 tournaments
$50,000 tournaments
$25,000 tournaments
$15,000 tournaments

=== Singles: 8 (3 titles, 5 runner-ups) ===
Result	W–L	Date	Tournament	Tier	Surface	Opponent	Score
Loss	1.	Feb 2003	ITF Tipton, United Kingdom	10,000	Hard (i)	(Croatia) Matea Mezak	6–4, 4–6, 4–6
Win	1.	Jul 2003	ITF Mont-de-Marsan, France	25,000	Clay	(Ukraine) Oleksandra Kravets	6–4, 6–2
Loss	2.	Oct 2003	ITF Latina, Italy	50,000	Clay	(Italy) Roberta Vinci	3–6, 4–6
Loss	3.	Nov 2005	ITF Pittsburgh, United States	75,000	Hard (i)	(United States) Lilia Osterloh	6–7^{(5)}, 4–6
Win	2.	Jul 2006	ITF Cuneo, Italy	50,000	Clay	(Italy) Alice Canepa	6–1, 6–2
Win	3.	Apr 2011	ITF Casablanca, Morocco	25,000	Clay	(Bosnia and Herzegovina) Mervana Jugić-Salkić	6–7^{(4)}, 6–2, 6–3
Loss	4.	May 2016	ITF La Marsa, Tunisia	25,000	Clay	(Russia) Victoria Kan	4–6, 4–6
Loss	5.	Jun 2016	ITF Moscow, Russia	25,000	Clay	(Russia) Anastasiya Komardina	6–7^{(3)}, 6–4, 3–6

=== Doubles: 23 (13 titles, 10 runner-ups) ===
Result	W–L	Date	Tournament	Tier	Surface	Partner	Opponents	Score
Loss	1.	Aug 2001	ITF Bucharest, Romania	10,000	Clay	(Israel) Yevgenia Savranska	(Ukraine) Olena Antypina (Ukraine) Yuliana Fedak	6–4, 1–6, 4–6
Win	1.	Sep 2001	ITF Bucharest, Romania	10,000	Clay	(Ukraine) Yuliana Fedak	(Romania) Adriana Burz (Serbia) Sanja Todorović	6–4, 6–0
Win	2.	Sep 2002	ITF Sofia, Bulgaria	25,000	Clay	(Russia) Vera Dushevina	(Italy) Laura Dell'Angelo (Italy) Nathalie Viérin	3–6, 6–4, 6–2
Loss	2.	Oct 2002	ITF Mansoura, Egypt	10,000	Clay	(Russia) Gulnara Fattakhetdinova	(Ukraine) Olena Antypina (Czech Republic) Hana Šromová	2–6, 2–6
Win	3.	Jan 2003	ITF Hull, United Kingdom	10,000	Hard (i)	(Russia) Irina Bulykina	(Belgium) Elke Clijsters (Serbia) Borka Majstorović	4–6, 7–6^{(0)}, 6–3
Loss	2.	Mar 2003	ITF Ostrava, Czech Republic	25,000	Hard (i)	(Czech Republic) Magdalena Zděnovcová	(Italy) Roberta Vinci (Serbia) Dragana Zarić	2–6, 4–6
Win	4.	May 2003	Open de Cagnes-sur-Mer, France	75,000	Clay	(Russia) Vera Dushevina	(Ukraine) Yuliya Beygelzimer (Ukraine) Anna Zaporozhanova	6–3, 6–4
Loss	4.	Sep 2003	ITF Tbilisi, Georgia	25,000	Clay	(Belarus) Nadejda Ostrovskaya	(Belarus) Darya Kustova (Ukraine) Elena Tatarkova	6–2, 2–6, 6–7^{(5)}
Win	5.	Apr 2004	ITF Dinan, France	50,000	Clay (i)	(Croatia) Darija Jurak	(Russia) Gulnara Fattakhetdinova (Russia) Anastasia Rodionova	6–3, 6–2
Loss	5.	Oct 2004	ITF Saint-Raphaël, France	50,000	Hard (i)	(Czech Republic) Barbora Strýcová	(France) Stéphanie Cohen-Aloro (Tunisia) Selima Sfar	6–7^{(3)}, 6–2, 4–6
Win	6.	Apr 2005	Dothan Classic, United States	75,000	Clay	(United States) Carly Gullickson	(United States) Julie Ditty (Czech Republic) Vladimíra Uhlířová	4–6, 6–1, 6–2
Win	7.	Jul 2005	ITF Cuneo, Italy	50,000	Clay	(Ukraine) Mariya Koryttseva	(Italy) Sara Errani (Italy) Giulia Gabba	6–3, 7–5
Win	8.	Oct 2006	ITF Saint-Raphaël, France	50,000	Carpet (i)	(Ukraine) Mariya Koryttseva	(France) Alizé Cornet (France) Youlia Fedossova	6–2, 6–4
Loss	6.	Nov 2006	ITF Pittsburgh, US	75,000	Hard (i)	(United States) Ashley Harkleroad	(Canada) Stéphanie Dubois (Russia) Alisa Kleybanova	4–6, 7–5, 1–6
Win	9.	Sep 2008	ITF Athens, Greece	100,000	Clay	(Romania) Sorana Cîrstea	(Germany) Kristina Barrois (Germany) Julia Schruff	6–2, 6–4
Loss	7.	Oct 2008	ITF Ortisei, Italy	100,000	Carpet (i)	(Estonia) Maret Ani	(Ukraine) Mariya Koryttseva (Kazakhstan) Yaroslava Shvedova	2–6, 1–6
Loss	8.	Oct 2009	ITF Ortisei, Italy	100,000	Carpet (i)	(Czech Republic) Barbora Strýcová	(Switzerland) Timea Bacsinszky (Italy) Tathiana Garbin	2–6, 2–6
Win	10.	Jul 2011	President's Cup, Kazakhstan	100,000	Hard	(Russia) Vitalia Diatchenko	(Uzbekistan) Akgul Amanmuradova (Russia) Alexandra Panova	6–3, 6–4
Win	11.	May 2016	ITF La Marsa, Tunisia	25,000	Clay	(Russia) Vitalia Diatchenko	(Russia) Victoria Kan (Uzbekistan) Sabina Sharipova	6–3, 1–6, [12–10]
Win	12.	Nov 2016	Open de Valencia, Spain	25,000	Clay	(North Macedonia) Lina Gjorcheska	(Spain) Alicia Herrero Liñana (Russia) Ksenija Sharifova	6–0, 6–0
Loss	9.	May 2018	Open de Cagnes-sur-Mer, France	100,000	Clay	(Belarus) Vera Lapko	(United States) Kaitlyn Christian (United States) Sabrina Santamaria	6–2, 5–7, [7–10]
Win	13.	May 2018	Empire Slovak Open	100,000	Clay	(Australia) Jessica Moore	(Switzerland) Xenia Knoll (United Kingdom) Anna Smith	0–6, 6–3, [10–7]
Loss	10.	Jun 2018	Ilkley Trophy, UK	100,000	Grass	(Russia) Natela Dzalamidze	(United States) Asia Muhammad (United States) Maria Sanchez	6–4, 3–6, [1–10]

== Head-to-head records ==
- Serena Williams 0–2
- Venus Williams 0–1
- Lindsay Davenport 0–1
- Maria Sharapova 1–1
- Victoria Azarenka 1–2
- Caroline Wozniacki 0–1
