= Open de Limoges =

Open BLS de Limoges

WTA 125K series
- Event name: Open GDF Suez Région Limousin (2007–2013); Open GDF Suez de Limoges (2014); Engie Open de Limoges (2015– 2018); Open BLS de Limoges (since 2019)
- Tour: ITF Women's Circuit (2007–2013); WTA 125 (since 2014)
- Founded: 2007; 19 years ago
- Location: Limoges; France
- Venue: Palais des Sports de Beaublanc
- Surface: Hard (indoor)
- Draw: 32S / 8Q / 8D
- Prize money: $115,000 (2025)

Current champions (2025)
- Women's singles: (Ukraine) Anhelina Kalinina
- Women's doubles: (Spain) Cristina Bucșa (China) Zhang Shuai

The Open BLS de Limoges (formerly Open GDF Suez de Limoges, Open GDF Suez Région Limousin and Engie Open de Limoges) is a tournament for professional female tennis players played on indoor hardcourts. The event is currently classified as a WTA 125 tournament and has been held in Limoges, France since 2007. Until 2013, the tournament was held annually as one of the ITF Women's Circuit.

== Past finals ==
=== Singles ===
Year	Champion	Runner-up	Score
2025	(Ukraine) Anhelina Kalinina (2)	(France) Elsa Jacquemot	6–3, 4–6, 7–5
2024	(Switzerland) Viktorija Golubic	(Switzerland) Céline Naef	7–5, 6–4
2023	(Spain) Cristina Bucșa	(France) Elsa Jacquemot	2–6, 6–1, 6–2
2022	(Ukraine) Anhelina Kalinina	(Denmark) Clara Tauson	6–3, 5–7, 6–4
2021	(Belgium) Alison Van Uytvanck	(Romania) Ana Bogdan	6–2, 7–5
2020	cancelled due to the COVID-19 pandemic		
2019	(Russia) Ekaterina Alexandrova (3)	(Belarus) Aliaksandra Sasnovich	6–1, 6–3
2018	(Russia) Ekaterina Alexandrova (2)	(Russia) Evgeniya Rodina	6–2, 6–2
2017	(Romania) Monica Niculescu	(Germany) Antonia Lottner	6–4, 6–2
2016	(Russia) Ekaterina Alexandrova	(France) Caroline Garcia	6–4, 6–0
2015	(France) Caroline Garcia	(United States) Louisa Chirico	6–1, 6–3
2014	(Czech Republic) Tereza Smitková	(France) Kristina Mladenovic	7–6^{(7–4)}, 7–5
↑ WTA 125 event ↑
2013	(Czech Republic) Kristýna Plíšková	(Austria) Tamira Paszek	3–6, 6–3, 6–2
2012	(France) Claire Feuerstein (2)	(Ukraine) Maryna Zanevska	7–5, 6–3
2011	(Romania) Sorana Cîrstea	(Sweden) Sofia Arvidsson	6–2, 6–2
2010	(Croatia) Ivana Lisjak	(Ukraine) Yuliya Beygelzimer	6–0, 6–3
2009	(France) Claire Feuerstein	(France) Anaïs Laurendon	6–0, 5–7, 6–3
2008	(Russia) Marina Melnikova	(Russia) Valeria Savinykh	1–0 ret.
2007	(France) Anne-Laure Heitz	(France) Audrey Bergot	6–1, 6–1
↑ ITF event ↑

=== Doubles ===
Year	Champions	Runners-up	Score
2025	(Spain) Cristina Bucșa (2) (China) Zhang Shuai	(France) Elsa Jacquemot (France) Jessika Ponchet	6–3, 6–1
2024	(France) Elsa Jacquemot (France) Margaux Rouvroy	Erika Andreeva (France) Séléna Janicijevic	6–4, 6–3
2023	(Spain) Cristina Bucșa; Yana Sizikova	(Georgia (country)) Oksana Kalashnikova (United Kingdom) Maia Lumsden	6–4, 6–1
2022	(Georgia (country)) Oksana Kalashnikova (Ukraine) Marta Kostyuk	(United Kingdom) Alicia Barnett (United Kingdom) Olivia Nicholls	7–5, 6–1
2021	(Romania) Monica Niculescu (Russia) Vera Zvonareva	(France) Estelle Cascino (France) Jessika Ponchet	6–4, 6–4
2020	cancelled due to the COVID-19 pandemic		
2019	(Spain) Georgina García Pérez (Spain) Sara Sorribes Tormo	(Russia) Ekaterina Alexandrova (Georgia (country)) Oksana Kalashnikova	6–2, 7–6^{(7–3)}
2018	(Russia) Veronika Kudermetova (Kazakhstan) Galina Voskoboeva	(Switzerland) Timea Bacsinszky (Russia) Vera Zvonareva	7–5, 6–4
2017	(Russia) Valeria Savinykh (Belgium) Maryna Zanevska	(France) Chloé Paquet (France) Pauline Parmentier	6–0, 6–2
2016	(Belgium) Elise Mertens (Luxembourg) Mandy Minella (2)	(United Kingdom) Anna Smith (Czech Republic) Renata Voráčová	6–4, 6–4
2015	(Czech Republic) Barbora Krejčíková (Luxembourg) Mandy Minella	(Russia) Margarita Gasparyan (Georgia (country)) Oksana Kalashnikova	1–6, 7–5, [10–6]
2014	(Czech Republic) Kateřina Siniaková (Czech Republic) Renata Voráčová	(Hungary) Tímea Babos (France) Kristina Mladenovic	2–6, 6–2, [10–5]
↑ WTA 125 event ↑
2013	(Switzerland) Viktorija Golubic (Poland) Magda Linette (2)	(Italy) Nicole Clerico (Czech Republic) Nikola Fraňková	6–4, 6–4
2012	(Poland) Magda Linette (Poland) Sandra Zaniewska	(France) Irena Pavlovic (Switzerland) Stefanie Vögele	6–1, 5–7, [10–5]
2011	(Sweden) Sofia Arvidsson (United States) Jill Craybas	(France) Caroline Garcia (France) Aurélie Védy	6–4, 4–6, [10–7]
2010	(Ukraine) Lyudmyla Kichenok (Ukraine) Nadiia Kichenok	(France) Claire Feuerstein (France) Caroline Garcia	6–7^{(5–7)}, 6–4, [10–8]
2009	(Russia) Elena Chalova (Georgia (country)) Oksana Kalashnikova	(France) Florence Haring (France) Violette Huck	4–6, 6–3, [10–4]
2008	(United Kingdom) Yasmine Clarke (United Kingdom) Olivia Scarfi	(Belarus) Volha Duko (Russia) Elina Gasanova	7–6^{(7–5)}, 5–7, [10–8]
2007	(Italy) Stella Menna (Netherlands) Bibiane Schoofs	(France) Adeline Goncalves (France) Gracia Radovanovic	6–4, 6–1
↑ ITF event ↑
