= Ekaterina Alexandrova =

Russian tennis player (born 1994)

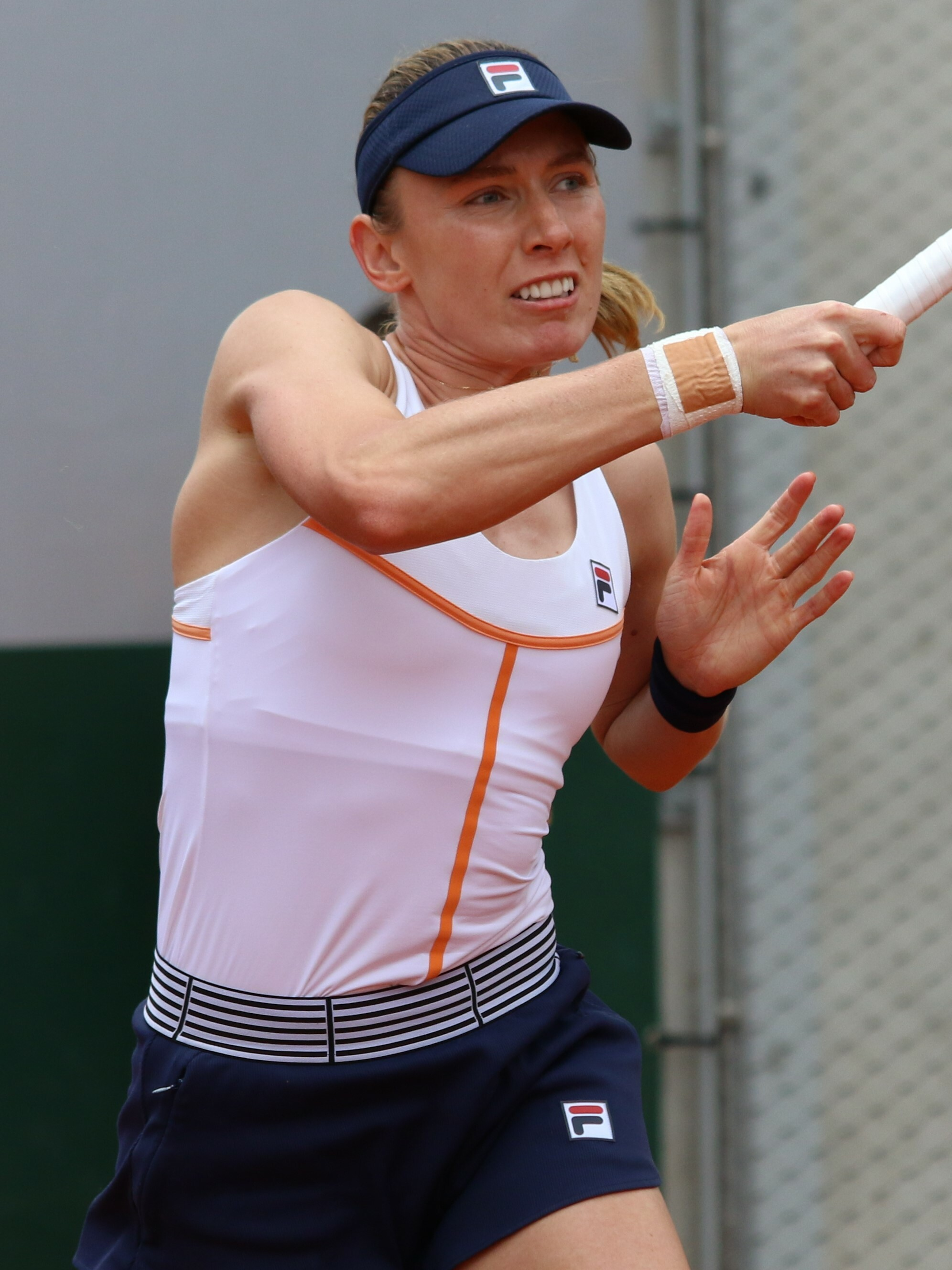
- Alexandrova at the 2022 French Open
- Full name: Ekaterina Evgenyevna Alexandrova
- Native name: Екатери́на Евге́ньевна Александро́ва
- Country (sports): Russia
- Residence: Prague, Czech Republic
- Born: 15 November 1994 (age 32) Chelyabinsk, Russia
- Height: 1.75 m (5 ft 9 in)
- Turned pro: 2011
- Plays: Right-handed (two-handed backhand)
- Coach: Igor Andreev (Dec 2024—), Evgeny Alexandrov, Vojta Flegl
- Prize money: US$ 10,450,902

Singles
- Career record: 475–304
- Career titles: 5
- Highest ranking: No. 10 (13 October 2025)
- Current ranking: No. 21 (14 September 2026)

Grand Slam singles results
- Australian Open: 3R (2020, 2021, 2023)
- French Open: 4R (2025)
- Wimbledon: 4R (2023, 2025)
- US Open: 4R (2025)

Other tournaments
- Tour Finals: RR (2025)
- Olympic Games: 2R (2021)

Doubles
- Career record: 83–103
- Career titles: 3
- Highest ranking: No. 36 (2 March 2026)
- Current ranking: No. 43 (29 June 2026)

Grand Slam doubles results
- Australian Open: 3R (2024)
- French Open: 2R (2019, 2020, 2025)
- Wimbledon: 3R (2025)
- US Open: 3R (2025)

Other doubles tournaments
- Olympic Games: 1R (2024)

Team competitions
- Fed Cup: W (2020–21), record 2–1
- Last updated on: 11 July 2026.

Ekaterina Evgenyevna Alexandrova (Russian: Екатери́на Евге́ньевна Александро́ва, IPA: [jɪkətʲɪˈrʲinə ɐlʲɪksɐnˈdrovə]; born 15 November 1994) is a Russian professional tennis player. She has a career-high singles ranking of world No. 10, achieved on 13 October 2025 and a best doubles ranking of No. 41, reached on 8 September 2025.

Alexandrova has won eight WTA Tour titles combined, five in singles and three in doubles. She also earned three WTA Challenger titles in singles, as well as seven singles titles on the ITF Women's World Tour.

== Personal life ==
Since 2006, Alexandrova has been living and training in Prague, Czech Republic, with her parents and two siblings, a brother and a sister. They moved after travelling to the city for a youth tournament, attracted by the local availability of tennis courts compared to Russia. According to the player, the Russian Tennis Federation didn't know about her existence before 2016 and she has never been good enough to cause interest from the Czech Tennis Association in terms of citizenship switch. However, she has long been tempted by the easier life possibility with a Czech passport, especially considering travel visas, but wasn't able to implement the opportunity at a certain point — after collecting all the necessary documents she couldn't decide if another citizenship is really the right decision for her. She hasn't applied for the Czech citizenship yet.

Alexandrova speaks Russian and Czech fluently, and also English, to a lesser extent. Her father Evgeny is her coach, and Steffi Graf was her childhood tennis idol.

== Career ==
=== 2016: WTA Tour debut, WTA 125 title ===
Alexandrova started the year ranked No. 291 and clinched her fifth ITF Circuit title in February at the 10k event in Trnava, defeating Karolína Muchová in the final. (Note: To obtain data from this reference, select the corresponding year on the WTA or ITF website.)

In April, Alexandrova made her WTA Tour singles debut at the Katowice Open where she qualified for the main draw, after surviving the qualifying rounds as an unseeded player. In her first WTA Tour main-draw match, she defeated world No. 115, Klára Koukalová, before falling to eventual finalist Camila Giorgi in three sets.

In June, Alexandrova competed at the Wimbledon Championships, which was both the first grass-court tournament of her career and her major debut. At the time of the entry deadline for the qualifying draw, she was ten ranking spots below the cutoff and ultimately gained entry after a last-minute withdrawal. She qualified for the main draw defeating Ons Jabeur in the first round and then prevailing 14–12 and 13–11 in three-set matches against Stephanie Vogt (saved a match point) and Harriet Dart, respectively. Overall, she played 108 games in just three matches. In the first round, she defeated 23rd seed and former world No. 1, Ana Ivanovic, in straight sets, causing one of the biggest upsets in the tournament. In the second round, she lost to Anna-Lena Friedsam.

After her Wimbledon run, Alexandrova returned to clay and reached the final of the ITS Cup, a 50k event, losing to compatriot and top seed Elizaveta Kulichkova in three sets.

In August, Alexandrova participated in the qualifying competition at the US Open. She defeated Robin Anderson in the first round and lost to Viktoriya Tomova in the second, both in three-set matches. She then competed at the Tournoi de Québec, defeating world No. 59, Julia Görges, in the first round, before losing to qualifier and eventual semifinalist, Tereza Martincová, in the second.

Entering the WTA 125 Open de Limoges as the world No. 133, Alexandrova caused a huge shock by ending the season with the biggest title of her career. En route, she defeated three local favourites: fourth seed Pauline Parmentier in the second round, second seed Alizé Cornet in the semifinals, and top seed world No. 24, Caroline Garcia, in the final.

=== 2017: Top 100 ===
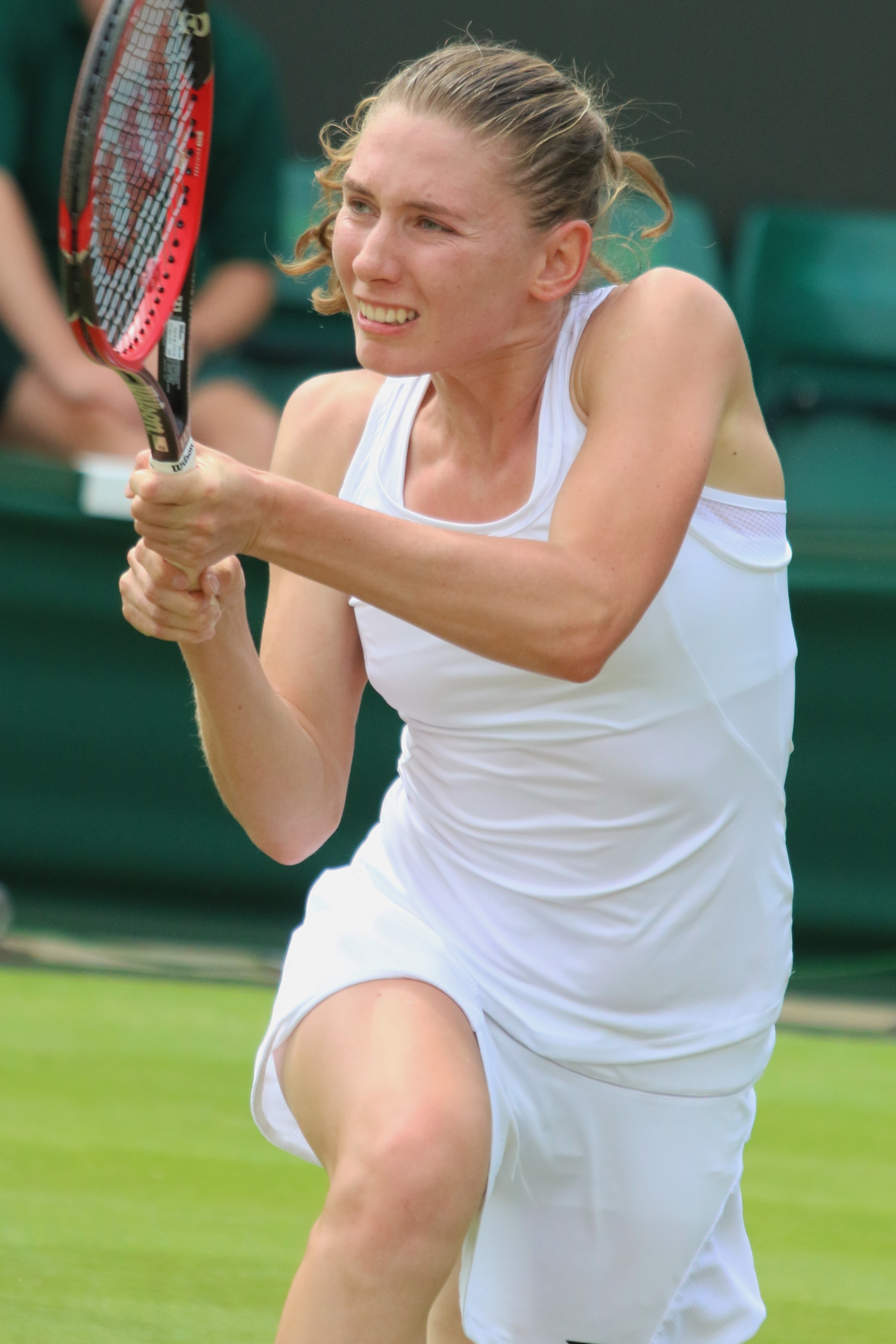
Alexandrova at the 2017 Wimbledon Championships

In the 2017 season, Alexandrova continued to be a constant presence on the WTA Tour but not achieving any major success. She received direct entry into the Australian Open main draw for the first time in her career, but lost to compatriot and 30th seed Ekaterina Makarova in the first round.

She made her top 100 debut with consecutive title runs a 60k events Pingshan Open and Open de Seine-et-Marne. Making her first French Open main-draw appearance, she defeated Kateřina Siniaková, before falling short to eventual semifinalist and world No. 2, Karolína Plíšková, in three sets. At the Wimbledon Championships, Alexandrova lost to eventual champion Garbiñe Muguruza in the first round.

In August, Alexandrova qualified for a Premier 5 tournament for the first time at the Rogers Cup and reached the second round, losing to world No. 6 and eventual runner-up, Caroline Wozniacki. At the US Open, she lost to 18th seed Caroline Garcia in the second round.

In November, Alexandrova returned to the Open de Limoges as the defending champion and lost in the quarterfinals to eventual runner-up Antonia Lottner.

=== 2018: Maiden WTA Tour final ===
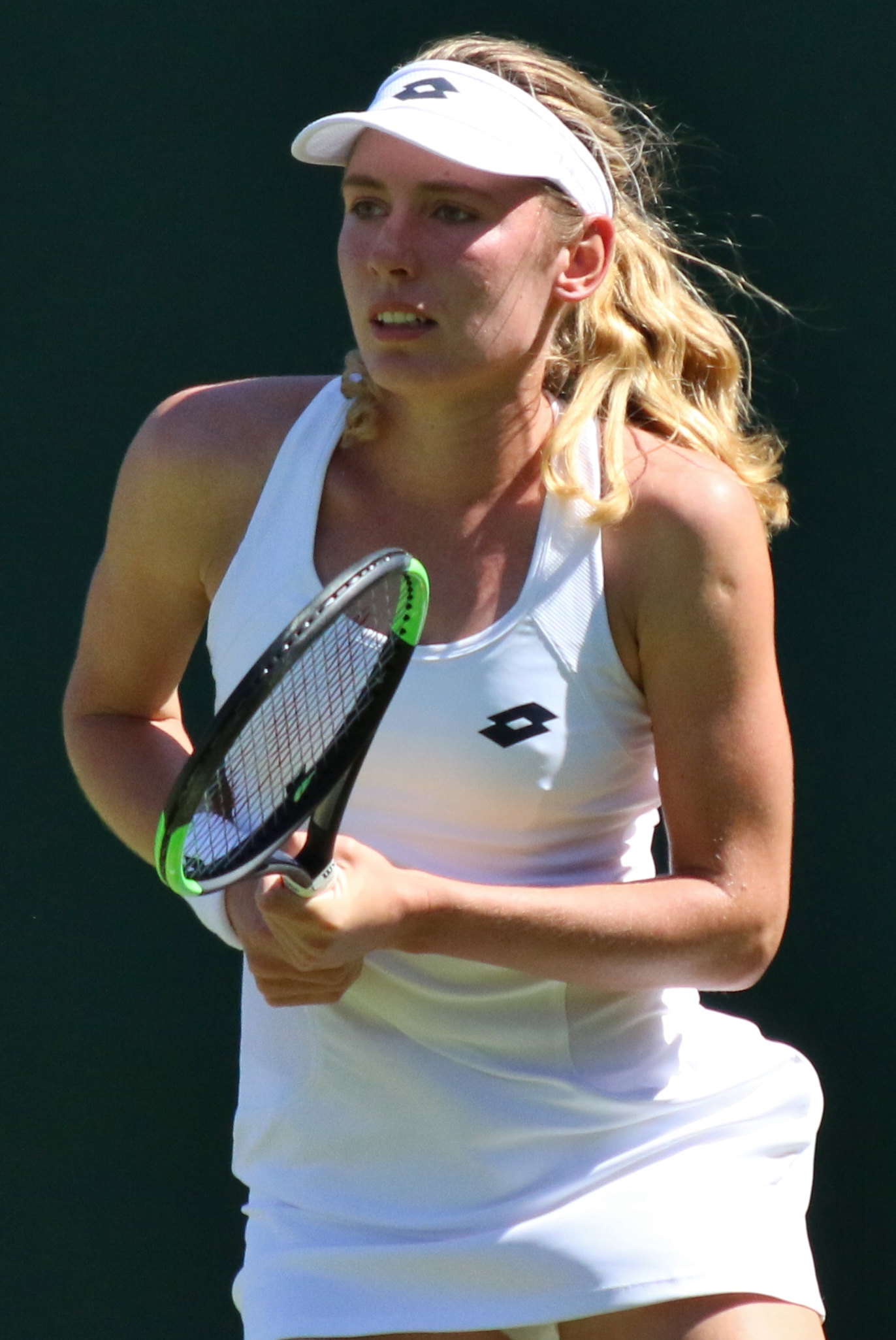
Alexandrova at the 2018 Wimbledon Championships

Alexandrova enjoyed a breakthrough season on the WTA Tour in 2018.

At the Australian Open, she was beaten by fellow hard hitting Madison Keys in the second round, winning just one game in the process.

After some mediocre results, Alexandrova fell out of the top 100. However, she managed to make the semifinals of 100k events, the Empire Slovak Open and Ilkley Trophy. Alongside a run to the final of the 100k event, the Hungarian Pro Ladies Open, she returned to the top 100.

In September, she reached her first WTA Tour quarterfinal at the Korea Open, clinching her first top-10 victory over world No. 10, Jeļena Ostapenko, in straight sets. The following month, Alexandrova made an astonishing run at another WTA International tournament, the Linz Open, qualifying for the main draw and reaching her first tour final. Sailing through the qualifying rounds with the loss of just four games, Alexandrova defeated compatriot Anastasia Pavlyuchenkova in straight sets to reach her first tour semifinal. There, she recovered from a bagel in the first set and defeated former top-10 player Andrea Petkovic. In the final, she lost to Camila Giorgi in straight sets, but nonetheless returned to the top 100.

She ended the season by tradition at Limoges, winning the title for the second time in her career beating Evgeniya Rodina in straight sets. This victory solidified her place in the top 100, finding herself at world No. 73 after the tournament.

=== 2019: Russian No. 1 ===
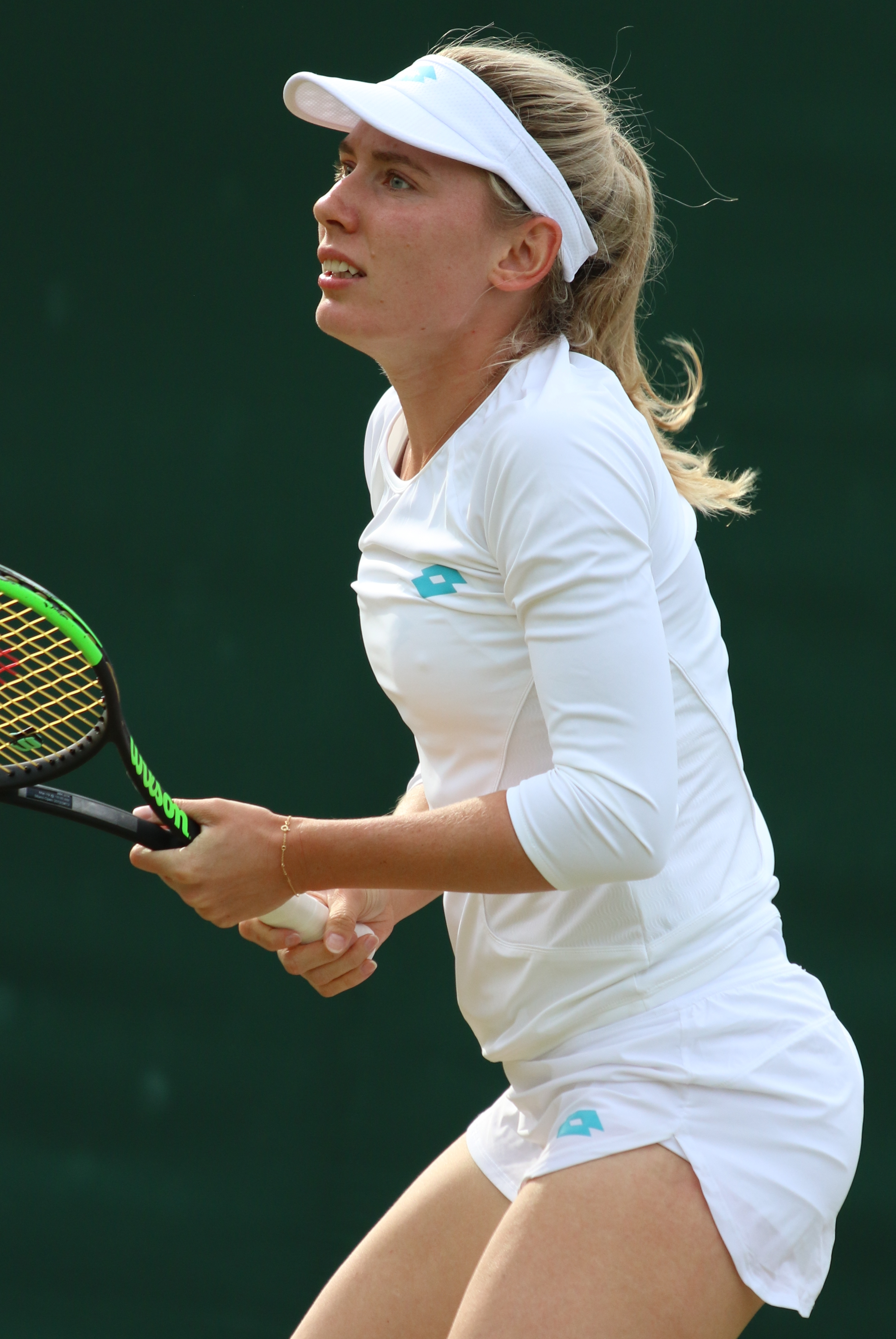
Alexandrova at the 2019 Wimbledon Championships

In 2019, Alexandrova continued to earn more success on the WTA Tour.

She began her season at the Shenzhen Open, where she lost in the second round to eventual champion and the top seed, Aryna Sabalenka.

Playing in a WTA Tour main draw at home for the first time, Alexandrova prevailed in the qualifying rounds, before reaching the quarterfinals of the St. Petersburg Trophy where she fell to Sabalenka, in straight sets once again. She then set a new career-high ranking of No. 59 after a semifinal run at the Hungarian Ladies Open where she held five match points against eventual champion Alison Van Uytvanck.

With her best result at a Premier Mandatory event, Alexandrova reached the third round of the Indian Wells Open by beating world No. 13 Wozniacki, in three sets. She did not perform well on clay courts, except at the French Open, reaching the third round of a major tournament for the first time in her career. She beat 30th seed Mihaela Buzărnescu in the first round, before stunning 2010 finalist Samantha Stosur in the second.

In the grass-court season, Alexandrova made it into the quarterfinals of the Eastbourne International and Rosmalen Championships, losing there to eventual champions Karolína Plíšková and Alison Riske, respectively. A disappointing first-round exit at Wimbledon followed, losing to Kateřina Siniaková in three sets.

She achieved her best run in a Premier 5 tournament at the Canadian Open, reaching the third round as qualifier. After leading throughout the majority of both sets, Alexandrova fell to Serena Williams in straight sets. Alexandrova also led world No. 4, Simona Halep, by a set and a break in the second round of the Cincinnati Open but failed to sustain her high level. She was defeated by 33rd seed Zhang Shuai in the second round of the US Open, a player whom she defeated in Cincinnati earlier on. Nonetheless, she became the highest-ranked Russian after this tournament.

Alexandrova reached her second career semifinal at the Korea Open, where she beat Kristie Ahn in the quarterfinals by hitting a personal-record 22 aces. Another strong run came at the Premier Mandatory China Open where she stunned world No. 5, Halep, in straight sets, claiming the biggest win of her career. However, she was defeated by compatriot Daria Kasatkina, again in straight sets.

Defending finalist points at the Linz Open, Alexandrova rolled into the semifinals but failed to convert her match points against Jeļena Ostapenko and leading in both the second and final sets. Making her main-draw debut at the Kremlin Cup, the Russian made the quarterfinals although her run was eventually stopped by the in-form Karolína Muchová. For the third time in her career, Alexandrova closed out her season with a triumph at the Open de Limoges, this time lifting the trophy as the top seed.

=== 2020: First WTA Tour title, Fed Cup debut ===
Alexandrova started the 2020 season at the Shenzhen Open. Seeded fifth, she won her first career singles title beating seventh seed Elena Rybakina in the final. As a result, she became the first player to win a WTA Tour tournament in the new decade. At the Australian Open where she was seeded at a major event for the first time, she reached the third round but then lost to seventh seed and last year finalist, Petra Kvitová.

Alexandrova then represented Russia for the first time in her career, leading the team against Romania in the Fed Cup as the Russian No. 1. On her debut, she led Russia to a tight 3–2 win over the home team, defeating Elena-Gabriela Ruse in straight sets and Ana Bogdan in a tight three-setter, helping to book Russia's spot in the inaugural Fed Cup Finals. She next participated at the St. Petersburg Trophy, where she reached the semifinals losing in three sets to defending champion and eventual champion, Kiki Bertens. At the Qatar Ladies Open, she suffered a first-round exit at the hands of Amanda Anisimova. The WTA Tour was suspended from March through July due to the COVID-19 pandemic.

When the WTA resumed tournament play in August, Alexandrova competed at the Palermo Ladies Open. Seeded eighth, she lost in the second round to eventual champion Fiona Ferro. Seeded fifth at the Prague Open, she was defeated in the first round by qualifier Lesia Tsurenko. At the Cincinnati Open, she lost in the second round to American qualifier Christina McHale. The tournament was held at the USTA BJK National Tennis Center for the first time, lowering the risk of the transmission of the virus behind closed doors. At the same competition ground, she stunned the returning former world No. 1 and three-time champion, Kim Clijsters, in the first round of the US Open, after recovering from a set down. However, she failed to back up her good win as she fell short to Caty McNally in round two.

At the Italian Open in Rome, Alexandrova was defeated in the first round by tenth seed Elena Rybakina. Seeded seventh at Strasbourg, she lost in the second round to Kateřina Siniaková. Seeded 27th at the French Open, she made it to the third round in which she was defeated by third seed Elina Svitolina.

At the first edition of the Ostrava Open, Alexandrova lost in the first round to eighth seed Anett Kontaveit. At her final tournament of the year, the Upper Austria Ladies Linz, she was seeded fourth and reached the semifinals where she was beaten by second seed Elise Mertens.

Alexandrova ended the season ranked 33.

=== 2021: Olympics debut, BJK Cup champion ===
Alexandrova started her season at the first edition of the Abu Dhabi Open. Seeded 17th, she lost in the third round to second seed Elina Svitolina. Seeded ninth at the first edition of the Gippsland Trophy, she upset top seed Simona Halep in her quarterfinal match after defeating French Open champion Iga Świątek. She was defeated in the semifinal by Kaia Kanepi. Seeded 29th at the Australian Open, she lost in the third round to top seed Ashleigh Barty.

As the top seed in Lyon, Alexandrova was defeated in the first round by qualifier and eventual champion, Clara Tauson. At the Dubai Championships, she lost in a three-set first round battle to Coco Gauff, after saving multiple match points and having match points of her own. Competing as the top seed at the St. Petersburg Ladies' Trophy, she reached the quarterfinals where she was defeated by compatriot and eventual finalist, Margarita Gasparyan. Seeded 30th in Miami, she lost in the third round to fifth seed Elina Svitolina.

At the Porsche Tennis Grand Prix, Alexandrova made it to the quarterfinals in a WTA Tour clay tournament for the first time in her career where she was defeated by second seed Simona Halep. In Madrid, she lost in the first round to 12th seed Victoria Azarenka. At the Italian Open, she was defeated in the third round by Jessica Pegula. Seeded third at the Internationaux de Strasbourg, she reached the quarterfinals where she lost to fifth seed and eventual champion, Barbora Krejčíková. Seeded 32nd at the French Open, she beat seven-time Grand Slam champion Venus Williams in the first round. She was defeated in the second round by eventual champion Krejčíková.

Alexandrova played only one grass-court tournament to prepare for Wimbledon. At the German Open, she stunned second seed Elina Svitolina in the second round for her second top-10 win of the year. She lost in the quarterfinals to fifth seed and eventual finalist, Belinda Bencic. Seeded 32nd at Wimbledon, she was shocked by qualifier Camila Osorio in the second round.

Representing Russia at the Summer Olympics, Alexandrova lost in the second round to Nadia Podoroska, after upsetting Elise Mertens in the first round.

Alexandrova lost in the opening rounds of the Cincinnati Open and the Tennis in Cleveland to Jennifer Brady and Irina-Camelia Begu, respectively. She ended a three-match losing streak at the US Open, defeating former major finalist Sara Errani in the first round with 42 winners. However, she was stunned by lucky loser Kamilla Rakhimova in the second round.

She lost to Tauson for the second time in 2021 at the Luxembourg Open before she retired in the final qualifying round of the Ostrava Open. After recuperating for more than a month, Alexandrova returned for the Kremlin Cup. She took the first set against top-10 player Ons Jabeur in the first round before her opponent was forced to retire. The Russian then defeated Anhelina Kalinina in straight sets to reach her first quarterfinal since June. She then sealed a huge upset over world No. 2, Aryna Sabalenka, in straight sets, before earning her third top 10 win of the tournament over Maria Sakkari when the Greek was forced to retire down 1–4 in the opening set. Leading 6–4, 4–0 in the final set against Anett Kontaveit, she was unable to close out the victory and finally lost in three sets.

Alexandrova was part of the Russian team that won the inaugural BJK Cup Finals in Prague. She lost the only match she competed in the week against Clara Burel, but Russia was still able to defeat France 2–1 in that tie and win the title at the end of the week.

=== 2022: WTA 1000 semifinal, two titles, top 20 ===
Alexandrova started her season at 2022 Adelaide International 1. She lost in the first round to Leylah Fernandez which is followed by a second round exit to Garbiñe Muguruza in Sydney. Unseeded at the Australian Open, she lost to Bernarda Pera in the first round. After defeating Camila Giorgi, she was defeated by Maria Sakkari in the second round of St. Petersburg. Alexandrova suffered early exits in both Indian Wells and Miami losing to Simona Halep and Victoria Azarenka, respectively, in the second rounds.

Alexandrova eventually turned her underwhelming season around and reached the semifinals of the Charleston Open, defeating Allie Kiick, Zheng Qinwen, Karolína Plíšková and Magda Linette in route. She lost to the eventual champion Belinda Bencic, in straight sets. Following a second-round exit in Stuttgart to Anett Kontaveit, she reached her first WTA 1000 semifinals in Madrid as a qualifier cruising past Ostapenko and Anisimova in route. She lost to the eventual champion, Ons Jabeur, in the semifinal. However, it was followed by a second round appearance in Rome where she lost to Maria Sakkari. Seeded 30th in the French Open, she lost to Irina-Camelia Begu in the second round.

She won her second tour title at the Rosmalen Open cruising past Dayana Yastremska, Anhelina Kalinina, Caty McNally, Veronika Kudermetova and Aryna Sabalenka dropping only one set. Following a second-round loss to Daria Kasatkina in Berlin, she suffered a wrist injury and took a break.

She suffered some early exits, after returning from injury losing in the second rounds of Cincinnati and Cleveland. Seeded 28th in the US Open, she reached the second round where she was defeated by Lauren Davis in three sets.

Alexandrova won her second title of the season in Seoul defeating Ostapenko in the final. She continued her great run of form in Ostrava as she surges into the semifinals with wins over Victoria Azarenka, Daria Kasatkina and Tereza Martincová. In the semifinals, she was ultimately defeated by world No. 1, Iga Świątek, in three sets. After reaching the semifinals in Ostrava, she made her top-20 debut in the WTA rankings on 10 October 2022. Seeded 15th in Guadalajara, she struggled with the high altitude as she lost to Camila Osorio in the first round.

=== 2023: Wimbledon 4th round ===
Alexandrova started her season at Adelaide where she lost in the first round to Markéta Vondroušová in three sets. It was followed by a second round withdrawal from Adelaide International 2, after getting a first-round win over Jaimee Fourlis, in straight sets. Seeded 19th at the Australian Open, Alexandrova defeated Ysaline Bonaventure and Taylor Townsend, before falling to Magda Linette in the third round.

In Miami, she reached the quarterfinals of a WTA 1000 for a second time, defeating ninth seed Belinda Bencic and Bianca Andreescu by retirement en route.

She won her second grass-court title at the Rosmalen Open as the defending champion with a win over compatriot Veronika Kudermetova. She continued her good form on grass reaching the fourth round at Wimbledon for the first time at a major.

=== 2024: Second WTA 1000 semifinal, top 15 ===
Alexandrova had a disappointing start to the season at the Brisbane International, where as the seventh seed, she had a bye in the first round, losing in the second round to qualifier Julia Riera in straight sets. In her next tournament, the Adelaide International, beat Magda Linette in the first round in three sets match, Veronika Kudermetova in the second round in straight sets, and top seed Elena Rybakina in the quarterfinals also in straight sets. In her semifinal match, she lost to Jelena Ostapenko. After this, she went on to the Australian Open, seeded 17th, she lost in the first round to Laura Siegemund in three sets.

Alexandrova participated in the newly upgraded WTA 500 Ladies Linz, where as second seed and with a bye in the first round, she defeated qualifier Jule Niemeier in the second in straight sets, and fifth seed and defending champion, Anastasia Potapova, in the quarterfinals, also in straight sets. In the semifinal, she beat third seed Donna Vekić in three sets. In the final, she faced top seed Ostapenko, losing in straight sets.

At the newly upgraded WTA 500 Monterrey Open, Alexandrova reached the semifinals as a third seed and with a bye in the first round, defeating wildcard player Renata Zarazúa, and seventh seed Yuan Yue before losing to Lulu Sun.

At the US Open, Alexandrova lost to eventual champion Sabalenka in the third round.

=== 2025: Best season: three major fourth rounds, top 10 debut ===
Seeded fourth at the Linz Open, Alexandrova received a bye in the first round and then defeated qualifiers Aliaksandra Sasnovich and Petra Martić, to reach the semifinals where she overcame top seed Karolína Muchová. In the final, she defeated fifth seed Dayana Yastremska in three sets to claim her first WTA 500 title and fifth overall. Alexandrova then reached the semifinals at the WTA 1000 Qatar Open with wins over wildcard entrant Emma Raducanu, world No. 1 Sabalenka, Elise Mertens, and sixth seed Jessica Pegula. She lost in the last four to Amanda Anisimova, bringing an end to her eight-match winning streak.

In April at the Charleston Open, Alexandrova defeated Ann Li, sixth seed Diana Shnaider and third seed Zheng Qinwen to reach the semifinals, where she lost to top seed Jessica Pegula in three sets. Two weeks later, Alexandrova made it through to the semifinals at the Stuttgart Open, before losing to eventful champion Jeļena Ostapenko. Partnering Zhang Shuai, she also reached the doubles final at the same event, losing to top seeds Gabriela Dabrowski and Erin Routliffe. Seeded 21 at the Madrid Open, Alexandrova made it to round four, before losing to Moyuka Uchijima. As the 20th seed at the French Open, Alexandrova had wins over Lucia Bronzetti, Elisabetta Cocciaretto, and Veronika Kudermetova, but lost in the fourth round to second seed Coco Gauff.

In June, moving onto the grass-court season as second seed at the Rosmalen Open in 's-Hertogenbosch, Alexandrova made it through to the semifinals where she lost to third seed Elise Mertens in three sets. Two weeks later she made the quarterfinals at the Bad Homburg Open with wins over Belinda Bencic and Maria Sakkari. Alexandrova lost in the last eight to fourth seed Iga Świątek. As an 18 seed at Wimbledon, she made it to the fourth round but lost to Belinda Bencic. As the top seed on the clay courts of the Hamburg Open, Alexandrova reached the quarterfinals with wins over two qualifiers and Caroline Werner, before losing to defending champion and seventh seed Anna Bondár in three sets.

In August, as the 12th seed at the Cincinnati Open, she made it through to the fourth round but lost to 28th seed Anna Kalinskaya. Subsequently Alexandrova reached a career-high WTA ranking of world No. 14 on 18 August 2025. Seeded second at the Monterrey Open, Alexandrova made it to the final, which included a win over defending champion Linda Nosková. There she lost to third seed Diana Shnaider in three sets. At the US Open, she defeated Anastasija Sevastova, Wang Xinyu, and Laura Siegemund to make it into the fourth round, where she lost to second seed Iga Świątek.

In September, 2nd seed Alexandrova made the finals of the Korea Open, defeating Loïs Boisson, Ella Seidel, and Kateřina Siniaková. She lost the championship match to top seed Iga Świątek in three sets. On 13 October 2025, following the Wuhan Open, where she lost to Jessica Pegula in the round of 16, Alexandrova secured her top-10 debut at 30 years old. Seeded fourth at the Ningbo Open, she defeated Yuan Yue, McCartney Kessler, and Diana Shnaider to reach the final, but lost to third seed Elena Rybakina in three sets. The following week at the Pan Pacific Open, Alexandrova overcame Jaqueline Cristian to make it into her 11th tour quarterfinal of the year. She lost to 10th seed Sofia Kenin in a third set tiebreak.

Alexandrova was second alternate for the WTA Finals in Riyadh in November and made her debut at the season-ending showpiece event when Madison Keys withdrew from the tournament after her first two group matches due to illness with first alternate, Mirra Andreeva, declining to take her place citing fitness issues. Alexandrova faced sixth seed Elena Rybakina and lost in straight sets.

=== 2026: Abu Dhabi doubles title and singles runner-up ===
In February, Alexandrova defeated Dayana Yastremska, Alexandra Eala, and wildcard entrant Hailey Baptiste to reach the final at the Abu Dhabi Open. She lost the championship match to 101-ranked qualifier Sára Bejlek in straight sets. An hour after the singles match she teamed with Australian Maya Joint for the doubles final against Tereza Mihalíková and Olivia Nicholls. The play concluded with Alexandrova and Joint winning in a tiebreak. For both Joint and Alexandrova, this was their first WTA 500 doubles title of their careers.

== Career statistics ==
=== Grand Slam tournament performance timelines ===
Key
W	F	SF	QF	#R	RR	Q#	DNQ	A	NH

(W) winner; (F) finalist; (SF) semifinalist; (QF) quarterfinalist; (#R) rounds 4, 3, 2, 1; (RR) round-robin stage; (Q#) qualification round; (DNQ) did not qualify; (A) absent; (NH) not held; (SR) strike rate (events won / competed); (W–L) win–loss record.
To avoid confusion and double counting, these charts are updated at the conclusion of a tournament or when the player's participation has ended.

==== Singles ====
Tournament	2016	2017	2018	2019	2020	2021	2022	2023	2024	2025	2026	SR	W–L	Win %
Australian Open	A	1R	2R	1R	3R	3R	1R	3R	1R	1R	1R	0 / 10	7–10	41%
French Open	A	2R	1R	3R	3R	2R	2R	3R	1R	4R	1R	0 / 10	12–10	55%
Wimbledon	2R	1R	1R	1R	NH	2R	A (Note: Suspended due to the ban of Russian and Belarusian athletes in light of the Russian invasion of Ukraine.)	4R	A	4R	3R	0 / 8	10–8	56%
US Open	Q2	2R	1R	2R	2R	2R	2R	3R	3R	4R		0 / 9	12–9	57%
Win–loss	1–1	2–4	1–4	3–4	5–3	5–4	2–3	9–4	2–3	9–4	2–3	0 / 37	41–37	53%

==== Doubles ====
Tournament	2018	2019	2020	2021	2022	2023	2024	2025	2026	SR	W–L	Win %
Australian Open	2R	A	1R	1R	A	1R	3R	2R	1R	0 / 7	4–7	36%
French Open	A	2R	2R	1R	1R	1R	1R	2R	1R	0 / 8	3–8	27%
Wimbledon	A	2R	NH	1R	A	2R	A	3R		0 / 4	4–4	50%
US Open	A	2R	A	1R	1R	1R	1R	3R		0 / 6	3–6	33%
Win–loss	1–1	3–3	1–2	0–4	0–2	1–4	2–3	6–4	0-2	0 / 25	14–25	36%

== Awards ==
National

- The Russian Cup in the nominations:
  - Olympians-2020;
  - Team of the Year: 2021.
