= 2023 Open Saint-Gaudens Occitanie – Singles =

Singles
- 2023 Open Saint-Gaudens Occitanie

Final
- Champion: (United States) Robin Montgomery
- Runner-up: (France) Alice Robbe
- Score: 7–5, 6–4

Events
Singles	Doubles
← 2022 ·	Open Saint-Gaudens Occitanie	· 2024 →

Ylena In-Albon was the defending champion but chose not to participate.

Robin Montgomery won the title, defeating Alice Robbe in the final, 7–5, 6–4.

== Seeds ==
1. (Switzerland) Viktorija Golubic (withdrew)
2. (France) Jessika Ponchet (withdrew)
3. (Brazil) Laura Pigossi (second round)
4. (Ukraine) Daria Snigur (semifinals)
5. (United States) Sachia Vickery (second round, retired)
6. (Andorra) Victoria Jiménez Kasintseva (quarterfinals)
7. (Uzbekistan) Nigina Abduraimova (semifinals)
8. Anastasia Zakharova (second round)
9. (United States) Robin Montgomery (champion)
10. (United Kingdom) Yuriko Miyazaki (second round)

== Draw ==
=== Key ===
- Q = Qualifier
- WC = Wild card
- LL = Lucky loser
- Alt = Alternate
- SE = Special exempt
- PR = Protected ranking
- ITF = ITF entry
- JE = Junior exempt
- w/o = Walkover
- r = Retired
- d = Defaulted
- SR = Special ranking

=== Finals ===
Semifinals
9	(United States) Robin Montgomery	7	6
7	(Uzbekistan) Nigina Abduraimova	5	3
4	(Ukraine) Daria Snigur	2	2
(France) Alice Robbe	6	6

Final
9	(United States) Robin Montgomery	7	6
(France) Alice Robbe	5	4

=== Top half ===
First round
9	(United States) R Montgomery	6	2	6
(Colombia) M Herazo González	3	6	0
Q	(France) M Léonard	6	6^{8}	2
(Brazil) C Alves	3	7^{10}	6
LL	(France) H Mohamed	1	0
(France) M Rouvroy	6	6
Q	(United States) A Reami	1	2
8	A Zakharova	6	6
3	(Brazil) L Pigossi	6	6^{4}	6
WC	(United Kingdom) SB Grey	1	7^{7}	2
WC	(France) L Wargnier	1	4
(Czech Republic) A Sisková	6	6
(Greece) S Sakellaridi	4	2
(France) E Léné	6	6
(France) E Dartron	4	2
7	(Uzbekistan) N Abduraimova	6	6

Second round
9	(United States) R Montgomery	6	6
(Brazil) C Alves	2	4
(France) M Rouvroy	6	6
8	A Zakharova	1	3
3	(Brazil) L Pigossi	4	4
(Czech Republic) A Sisková	6	6
(France) E Léné	5	1
7	(Uzbekistan) N Abduraimova	7	6

Quarterfinals
9	(United States) R Montgomery	6	6
(France) M Rouvroy	4	2
(Czech Republic) A Sisková	2	1
7	(Uzbekistan) N Abduraimova	6	6

Semifinals
9	(United States) R Montgomery	7	6
7	(Uzbekistan) N Abduraimova	5	3

=== Bottom half ===
First round
5	(United States) S Vickery	6	6
(France) A Albié	1	3
Q	(Australia) TN Smith	3	1
(France) L Nguyen Tan	6	6
Q	(Germany) K Kanev	6	3	6
S Lansere	4	6	1
Q	(France) Y Mansouri	3	1
4	(Ukraine) D Snigur	6	6
6	(Andorra) V Jiménez Kasintseva	6	6
Q	(France) A Lew Yan Foon	1	3
(France) H Tan	6	6^{11}	2^{r}
Q	(France) S Iliev	1	7^{13}	2
WC	(France) TS Rakotomanga Rajaonah	3	7	4
(France) A Robbe	6	5	6
Q	(France) L Petretic	3	1
10	(United Kingdom) Y Miyazaki	6	6

Second round
5	(United States) S Vickery	5	0^{r}
(France) L Nguyen Tan	7	3
Q	(Germany) K Kanev	3	6	3
4	(Ukraine) D Snigur	6	3	6
6	(Andorra) V Jiménez Kasintseva	6	7
Q	(France) S Iliev	1	5
(France) A Robbe	2	6	6
10	(United Kingdom) Y Miyazaki	6	3	4

Quarterfinals
(France) L Nguyen Tan	4	1
4	(Ukraine) D Snigur	6	6
6	(Andorra) V Jiménez Kasintseva	5	4
(France) A Robbe	7	6

Semifinals
4	(Ukraine) D Snigur	2	2
(France) A Robbe	6	6
