= 2023 Engie Open de l'Isère =

Tennis tournament

- Date: 6–12 February 2023
- Edition: 13th
- Category: ITF Women's World Tennis Tour
- Prize money: $60,000
- Surface: Hard / Indoor
- Location: Grenoble, France

Champions

Singles
- (France) Océane Dodin

Doubles
- (United Kingdom) Freya Christie / (United Kingdom) Ali Collins
← 2022 ·	Open de l'Isère	· 2024 →

The 2023 Engie Open de l'Isère was a professional tennis tournament played on indoor hard courts. It was the thirteenth edition of the tournament, which was part of the 2023 ITF Women's World Tennis Tour. It took place in Grenoble, France, between 6 and 12 February 2023.

== Champions ==
=== Singles ===
- (France) Océane Dodin def. (Switzerland) Simona Waltert, 6–2, 7–5

=== Doubles ===
- (United Kingdom) Freya Christie / (United Kingdom) Ali Collins def. Sofya Lansere / Maria Timofeeva, 6–4, 6–3

== Singles main draw entrants ==
=== Seeds ===
Country	Player	Rank	Seed
FRA	Clara Burel	107	1
FRA	Océane Dodin	109	2
SUI	Simona Waltert	129	3
FRA	Elsa Jacquemot	146	4
	Oksana Selekhmeteva	154	5
FRA	Chloé Paquet	157	6
FRA	Jessika Ponchet	164	7
ROU	Irina Bara	194	8

- Rankings are as of 30 January 2023.

=== Other entrants ===
The following players received wildcards into the singles main draw:

- (France) Nahia Berecoechea
- (France) Emma Léné
- (France) Amandine Monnot
- (France) Laïa Petretic

The following player received entry into the singles main draw using a special ranking:

- Sofya Lansere

The following players received entry from the qualifying draw:

- (France) Émeline Dartron
- (France) Gaëlle Desperrier
- (Italy) Giulia Gatto-Monticone
- (Germany) Kathleen Kanev
- (Czech Republic) Aneta Laboutková
- (France) Manon Léonard
- (United Kingdom) Eliz Maloney
- (France) Margaux Rouvroy
