= 2024 Engie Open de l'Isère – Singles =

Singles
- 2024 Engie Open de l'Isère

Final
- Champion: Aliona Falei
- Runner-up: (France) Manon Léonard
- Score: 6–1, 4–6, 6–4

Events
Singles	Doubles
← 2023 ·	Open de l'Isère	· 2025 →

Océane Dodin was the defending champion but chose not to participate.

Aliona Falei won the title, defeating Manon Léonard in the final, 6–1, 4–6, 6–4.

== Seeds ==
1. (Czech Republic) Tereza Martincová (first round, retired)
2. (Germany) Ella Seidel (second round)
3. (France) Elsa Jacquemot (semifinals)
4. (France) Alice Robbe (second round)
5. (France) Harmony Tan (quarterfinals)
6. Julia Avdeeva (first round)
7. (France) Margaux Rouvroy (quarterfinals)
8. Aliona Falei (champion)

== Draw ==
=== Key ===
- Q = Qualifier
- WC = Wild card
- LL = Lucky loser
- Alt = Alternate
- SE = Special exempt
- PR = Protected ranking
- ITF = ITF entry
- JE = Junior exempt
- w/o = Walkover
- r = Retired
- d = Defaulted
- SR = Special ranking

=== Finals ===
Semifinals
(France) Manon Léonard	6	3	7^{7}
3	(France) Elsa Jacquemot	2	6	6^{5}
8	Aliona Falei	6	6
Q	Ekaterina Maklakova	3	2

Final
(France) Manon Léonard	1	6	4
8	Aliona Falei	6	4	6

=== Top half ===
First round
1	(Czech Republic) T Martincová	0	0^{r}
(France) L Boisson	6	1
Q	(United Kingdom) F Christie	6	6
(Malta) F Curmi	4	3
(France) M Léonard	6	6
WC	(France) E Léné	1	4
Q	A Kovaleva	7	7^{7}
6	J Avdeeva	5	6^{0}
3	(France) E Jacquemot	4	6	6
Q	(Germany) K Kanev	6	2	2
WC	(France) A Monnot	2	3
WC	(France) A Lew Yan Foon	6	6
(Serbia) L Radivojević	2	3
Q	(United Kingdom) SB Grey	6	6
(Burundi) S Nahimana	4	3
5	(France) H Tan	6	6

Second round
(France) L Boisson	6	7^{7}
Q	(United Kingdom) F Christie	3	6^{4}
(France) M Léonard	6	6
Q	A Kovaleva	1	1
3	(France) E Jacquemot	7	7^{10}
WC	(France) A Lew Yan Foon	5	6^{8}
Q	(United Kingdom) SB Grey	3	4
5	(France) H Tan	6	6

Quarterfinals
(France) L Boisson	2	2
(France) M Léonard	6	6
3	(France) E Jacquemot	1	7	6
5	(France) H Tan	6	5	3

Semifinals
(France) M Léonard	6	3	7^{7}
3	(France) E Jacquemot	2	6	6^{5}

=== Bottom half ===
First round
8	A Falei	6	6
(Italy) S Ambrosio	0	4
(Bosnia and Herzegovina) N Berberović	6^{9}	1
(Turkey) B Cengiz	7^{11}	6
SR	(Poland) M Chwalińska	7^{8}	6^{4}	6
(France) A Albié	6^{6}	7^{7}	4
Q	(Germany) T Morderger	6	3	1
4	(France) A Robbe	3	6	6
7	(France) M Rouvroy	7^{7}	3	7
(Liechtenstein) K von Deichmann	6^{5}	6	5
WC	(France) D Mpetshi Perricard	5	4
Q	A Ibragimova	7	6
Q	E Maklakova	7	6
(United Kingdom) E Silva	5	1
Q	(United Kingdom) E Appleton	3	1
2	(Germany) E Seidel	6	6

Second round
8	A Falei	6	6
(Turkey) B Cengiz	3	3
SR	(Poland) M Chwalińska	7	6
4	(France) A Robbe	5	4
7	(France) M Rouvroy	5	7^{7}	7
Q	A Ibragimova	7	6^{3}	5
Q	E Maklakova	6	4	7^{7}
2	(Germany) E Seidel	2	6	6^{3}

Quarterfinals
8	A Falei	6	2
(Poland) M Chwalińska	4	0^{r}
7	(France) M Rouvroy	5	4
Q	E Maklakova	7	6

Semifinals
8	A Falei	6	6
Q	E Maklakova	3	2
