= 2024 Open Saint-Gaudens Occitanie – Doubles =

Doubles
- 2024 Open Saint-Gaudens Occitanie

Final
- Champions: (France) Émeline Dartron (France) Tiantsoa Sarah Rakotomanga Rajaonah
- Runners-up: (France) Estelle Cascino (France) Carole Monnet
- Score: 6–3, 1–6, [12–10]

Events
Singles	Doubles
← 2023 ·	Open Saint-Gaudens Occitanie	· 2025 →

Sofya Lansere and Anna Sisková were the defending champions but Sisková chose not to participate. Lansere partnered Tara Würth but lost in the first round to Astrid Lew Yan Foon and Jenny Lim.

Émeline Dartron and Tiantsoa Sarah Rakotomanga Rajaonah won the title, defeating Estelle Cascino and Carole Monnet in the final, 6–3, 1–6, [12–10].

== Seeds ==
1. (United Kingdom) Alicia Barnett / (Australia) Olivia Gadecki (quarterfinals)
2. (Switzerland) Conny Perrin / (United Kingdom) Eden Silva (semifinals)
3. (France) Estelle Cascino / (France) Carole Monnet (final)
4. (Netherlands) Isabelle Haverlag / (Switzerland) Céline Naef (first round)

== Draw ==
=== Key ===
- Q = Qualifier
- WC = Wild card
- LL = Lucky loser
- Alt = Alternate
- SE = Special exempt
- PR = Protected ranking
- ITF = ITF entry
- JE = Junior exempt
- w/o = Walkover
- r = Retired
- d = Defaulted
- SR = Special ranking

First round
1	(United Kingdom) A Barnett (Australia) O Gadecki	6	7^{7}
(Ukraine) M Kolb (Ukraine) N Kolb	4	6^{2}
E Maklakova (France) A Robbe	2	2
(Czech Republic) M Bayerlová (Croatia) M Dražić	6	6
4	(Netherlands) I Haverlag (Switzerland) C Naef	6^{5}	6	[7]
WC	(France) É Dartron (France) TS Rakotomanga Rajaonah	7^{7}	1	[10]
(Colombia) MP Pérez; E Yashina	6	6
(Romania) O Gavrilă (Germany) K Kanev	3	4
WC	(France) A Lew Yan Foon (France) J Lim	2	6	[10]
Alt	S Lansere (Croatia) T Würth	6	4	[6]
WC	(United States) EF Wiesenfeld (Czech Republic) D Žoldáková	3	6^{0}
3	(France) E Cascino (France) C Monnet	6	7^{7}
E Makarova (Bosnia and Herzegovina) A Wagner	0	6^{5}
(France) E Léné (France) M Léonard	6	7^{7}
(Italy) M Colmegna (Georgia (country)) S Shapatava	0	6^{2}
2	(Switzerland) C Perrin (United Kingdom) E Silva	6	7^{7}

Quarterfinals
1	(United Kingdom) A Barnett (Australia) O Gadecki	1	4
(Czech Republic) M Bayerlová (Croatia) M Dražić	6	6
WC	(France) É Dartron (France) TS Rakotomanga Rajaonah	6	6
(Colombia) MP Pérez; E Yashina	3	4
WC	(France) A Lew Yan Foon (France) J Lim	1	6^{5}
3	(France) E Cascino (France) C Monnet	6	7^{7}
(France) E Léné (France) M Léonard	6^{5}	4
2	(Switzerland) C Perrin (United Kingdom) E Silva	7^{7}	6

Semifinals
(Czech Republic) M Bayerlová (Croatia) M Dražić	3	6^{4}
WC	(France) É Dartron (France) TS Rakotomanga Rajaonah	6	7^{7}
3	(France) E Cascino (France) C Monnet	6	6
2	(Switzerland) C Perrin (United Kingdom) E Silva	1	3

Final
(France) É Dartron (France) TS Rakotomanga Rajaonah	6	1	[12]
3	(France) E Cascino (France) C Monnet	3	6	[10]
