= 2024 L'Open 35 de Saint-Malo – Doubles =

Doubles
- 2024 L'Open 35 de Saint-Malo

Final
- Champions: Amina Anshba (Czech Republic) Anastasia Dețiuc
- Runners-up: (France) Estelle Cascino (France) Carole Monnet
- Score: 7–6^{(9–7)}, 2–6, [10–5]

Details
- Draw: 16
- Seeds: 4

Events
Singles	Doubles
← 2023 ·	L'Open 35 de Saint-Malo	· 2025 →

Greet Minnen and Bibiane Schoofs were the reigning champions but Minnen did not participate this year. Schoofs partnered with Katarzyna Kawa, but they lost to Carmen and Ivana Corley in the first round.

Amina Anshba and Anastasia Dețiuc won the title, defeating Estelle Cascino and Carole Monnet in the final, 7–6^{(9–7)}, 2–6, [10–5].

== Seeds ==
1. (Mexico) Giuliana Olmos / Alexandra Panova (first round)
2. (Australia) Olivia Gadecki / (United Kingdom) Olivia Nicholls (semifinals, withdrew)
3. (Italy) Angelica Moratelli / (Italy) Camilla Rosatello (semifinals)
4. (Poland) Katarzyna Kawa / (Netherlands) Bibiane Schoofs (first round)

== Draw ==
=== Key ===
- Q = Qualifier
- WC = Wild card
- LL = Lucky loser
- Alt = Alternate
- SE = Special exempt
- PR = Protected ranking
- ITF = ITF entry
- JE = Junior exempt
- w/o = Walkover
- r = Retired
- d = Defaulted
- SR = Special ranking

=== Draw ===
First round
1	(Mexico) G Olmos; A Panova	5	1
(Netherlands) I Haverlag (Switzerland) C Naef	7	6
A Anshba (Czech Republic) A Dețiuc	6	7^{7}
(France) E Léné (France) M Léonard	3	6^{3}
3	(Italy) A Moratelli (Italy) C Rosatello	6	7^{8}
(France) L Boisson (France) S Janicijevic	4	6^{6}
S Lansere (France) J Ponchet	w/o
(France) A Lew Yan Foon (France) M Rouvroy
(France) E Cascino (France) C Monnet	6	6
(France) E Inisan (France) D Martynov	2	1
(United States) C Corley (United States) I Corley	3	7^{7}	[10]
4	(Poland) K Kawa (Netherlands) B Schoofs	6	6^{5}	[4]
(Colombia) MP Pérez (Mexico) R Zarazúa	3	5
(France) E Jacquemot (France) C Paquet	6	7
(United Kingdom) E Silva; A Tikhonova	5	7	[8]
2	(Australia) O Gadecki (United Kingdom) O Nicholls	7	5	[10]

Quarterfinals
(Netherlands) I Haverlag (Switzerland) C Naef	5	7	[8]
A Anshba (Czech Republic) A Dețiuc	7	5	[10]
3	(Italy) A Moratelli (Italy) C Rosatello	6	7
S Lansere (France) J Ponchet	1	5
(France) E Cascino (France) C Monnet	6	6
(United States) C Corley (United States) I Corley	4	4
(France) E Jacquemot (France) C Paquet	6^{6}	1
2	(Australia) O Gadecki (United Kingdom) O Nicholls	7^{8}	6

Semifinals
A Anshba (Czech Republic) A Dețiuc	6	6
3	(Italy) A Moratelli (Italy) C Rosatello	3	3
(France) E Cascino (France) C Monnet	w/o
2	(Australia) O Gadecki (United Kingdom) O Nicholls

Final
A Anshba (Czech Republic) A Dețiuc	7^{9}	2	[10]
(France) E Cascino (France) C Monnet	6^{7}	6	[5]
