= 2024 Open Saint-Gaudens Occitanie – Singles =

Singles
- 2024 Open Saint-Gaudens Occitanie

Final
- Champion: (United States) Claire Liu
- Runner-up: (France) Séléna Janicijevic
- Score: 6–1, 6–7^{(3–7)}, 6–0

Events
Singles	Doubles
← 2023 ·	Open Saint-Gaudens Occitanie	· 2025 →

Robin Montgomery was the defending champion but chose not to participate.

Claire Liu won the title, defeating Séléna Janicijevic in the final, 6–1, 6–7^{(3–7)}, 6–0.

== Seeds ==
1. (United States) Claire Liu (champion)
2. (France) Léolia Jeanjean (first round)
3. (France) Jessika Ponchet (semifinals)
4. (France) Elsa Jacquemot (semifinals)
5. (Australia) Olivia Gadecki (quarterfinals)
6. (Switzerland) Céline Naef (first round)
7. Ekaterina Makarova (quarterfinals)
8. Anastasia Tikhonova (first round)

== Draw ==
=== Key ===
- Q = Qualifier
- WC = Wild card
- LL = Lucky loser
- Alt = Alternate
- SE = Special exempt
- PR = Protected ranking
- ITF = ITF entry
- JE = Junior exempt
- w/o = Walkover
- r = Retired
- d = Defaulted
- SR = Special ranking

=== Finals ===
Semifinals
1	(United States) Claire Liu	6	7^{7}
3	(France) Jessika Ponchet	1	6^{5}
4/WC	(France) Elsa Jacquemot	4	4
(France) Séléna Janicijevic	6	6

Final
1	(United States) Claire Liu	6	6^{3}	6
(France) Séléna Janicijevic	1	7^{7}	0

=== Top half ===
First round
1	(United States) C Liu	6	6
(France) C Monnet	2	4
Q	(Switzerland) C Perrin	6	6
S Lansere	1	4
Q	(France) É Dartron	7	6
(France) M Léonard	5	3
(Australia) TN Smith	4	7	6
8	A Tikhonova	6	5	0
3	(France) J Ponchet	7	6
WC	(Croatia) T Würth	5	3
(Canada) V Mboko	6	6
Q	(France) A Lew Yan Foon	3	0
LL	(France) D Mpetshi Perricard	6^{5}	2
Q	(France) A Rezaï	7^{7}	6
Q	(France) J Lim	6	6
6	(Switzerland) C Naef	3	3

Second round
1	(United States) C Liu	7	6
Q	(Switzerland) C Perrin	5	2
Q	(France) É Dartron	6^{3}	7	6
(Australia) TN Smith	7^{7}	5	4
3	(France) J Ponchet	6	6
(Canada) V Mboko	2	1
Q	(France) A Rezaï	1	6	5
Q	(France) J Lim	6	3	7

Quarterfinals
1	(United States) C Liu	6	6
Q	(France) É Dartron	1	2
3	(France) J Ponchet	7	6
Q	(France) J Lim	5	3

Semifinals
1	(United States) C Liu	6	7^{7}
3	(France) J Ponchet	1	6^{5}

=== Bottom half ===
First round
5	(Australia) O Gadecki	2	6	6
(France) A Hesse	6	1	1
(France) H Tan	5
Q	(France) A Ramé	0^{r}
(Ukraine) K Zavatska	6	6^{10}	6
(China) X You	2	7^{12}	2
(Argentina) S Sierra	3	4
4/WC	(France) E Jacquemot	6	6
7	E Makarova	4	7	6
Q	(France) D Martynov	6	5	4
(Poland) K Kawa	6	6
(France) A Robbe	0	2
LL	(Georgia (country)) S Shapatava	6	6
Q	(Romania) O Gavrilă	3	3
(France) S Janicijevic	6	6
2/WC	(France) L Jeanjean	0	4

Second round
5	(Australia) O Gadecki	6	6
(France) H Tan	4	3
(Ukraine) K Zavatska	4	2
4/WC	(France) E Jacquemot	6	6
7	E Makarova	3	6	6
(Poland) K Kawa	6	4	3
LL	(Georgia (country)) S Shapatava	6	1	4
(France) S Janicijevic	3	6	6

Quarterfinals
5	(Australia) O Gadecki	2	1
4/WC	(France) E Jacquemot	6	6
7	E Makarova	3	4
(France) S Janicijevic	6	6

Semifinals
4/WC	(France) E Jacquemot	4	4
(France) S Janicijevic	6	6
