= 2023 Open Saint-Gaudens Occitanie =

Tennis tournament

- Date: 15–21 May 2023
- Edition: 26th
- Category: ITF Women's World Tennis Tour
- Prize money: $60,000
- Surface: Clay / Outdoor
- Location: Saint-Gaudens, France

Champions

Singles
- (United States) Robin Montgomery

Doubles
- Sofya Lansere / (Czech Republic) Anna Sisková
← 2022 ·	Open Saint-Gaudens Occitanie	· 2024 →

The 2023 Open Saint-Gaudens Occitanie was a professional tennis tournament played on outdoor clay courts. It was the twenty-sixth edition of the tournament, which was part of the 2023 ITF Women's World Tennis Tour. It took place in Saint-Gaudens, France, between 15 and 21 May 2023.

== Champions ==
=== Singles ===
- (United States) Robin Montgomery def. (France) Alice Robbe, 7–5, 6–4

=== Doubles ===
- Sofya Lansere / (Czech Republic) Anna Sisková def. (Colombia) María Herazo González / (United States) Adriana Reami, 6–0, 3–6, [10–6]

== Singles main draw entrants ==
=== Seeds ===
Country	Player	Rank	Seed
~~SUI~~	~~Viktorija Golubic~~	~~115~~	~~1~~
~~FRA~~	~~Jessika Ponchet~~	~~119~~	~~2~~
BRA	Laura Pigossi	133	3
UKR	Daria Snigur	169	4
USA	Sachia Vickery	172	5
AND	Victoria Jiménez Kasintseva	177	6
UZB	Nigina Abduraimova	181	7
	Anastasia Zakharova	188	8
USA	Robin Montgomery	195	9
GBR	Yuriko Miyazaki	204	10

- Rankings are as of 8 May 2023.

=== Other entrants ===
The following players received wildcards into the singles main draw:

- (United Kingdom) Sarah Beth Grey
- (France) Tiantsoa Sarah Rakotomanga Rajaonah
- (France) Lucie Wargnier

The following players received entry from the qualifying draw:

- (France) Sarah Iliev
- (Germany) Kathleen Kanev
- (France) Manon Léonard
- (France) Astrid Lew Yan Foon
- (France) Yasmine Mansouri
- (France) Laïa Petretic
- (United States) Adriana Reami
- (Australia) Tina Nadine Smith

The following player received entry as a lucky loser:

- (France) Héléna Mohamed
