= 2025 L'Open 35 de Saint-Malo – Doubles =

Doubles
- 2025 L'Open 35 de Saint-Malo

Final
- Champions: (United Kingdom) Maia Lumsden (Japan) Makoto Ninomiya
- Runners-up: (Georgia (country)) Oksana Kalashnikova (Italy) Angelica Moratelli
- Score: 7–5, 6–2

Details
- Draw: 16
- Seeds: 4

Events
Singles	Doubles
← 2024 ·	L'Open 35 de Saint-Malo	· 2026 →

Maia Lumsden and Makoto Ninomiya won the doubles title at the 2025 L'Open 35 de Saint-Malo, defeating Oksana Kalashnikova and Angelica Moratelli in the final, 7–5, 6–2.

Amina Anshba and Anastasia Dețiuc were the reigning champions, but Deṭiuc did not participate this year. Anshba partnered Noma Noha Akugue, but lost in the first round to Léolia Jeanjean and Jessika Ponchet.

== Seeds ==
1. (United Kingdom) Maia Lumsden / (Japan) Makoto Ninomiya (champions)
2. (Georgia (country)) Oksana Kalashnikova / (Italy) Angelica Moratelli (final)
3. (United Kingdom) Emily Appleton / (China) Tang Qianhui (quarterfinals)
4. Amina Anshba / (Germany) Noma Noha Akugue (first round)

== Draw ==
=== Key ===
- Q = Qualifier
- WC = Wild card
- LL = Lucky loser
- Alt = Alternate
- ITF = ITF entry
- PR = Protected ranking
- SR = Special ranking
- SE = Special exempt
- JE = Junior exempt
- JR = Junior Accelerator Programme entrant
- CO = College Accelerator Programme entrant
- NG = Next Gen Accelerator Program entrant
- w/o = Walkover
- r = Retired
- d = Defaulted

=== Draw ===
First round
1	(United Kingdom) M Lumsden (Japan) M Ninomiya	6	6
(Switzerland) N Karamoko (Switzerland) C Perrin	4	1
(United Kingdom) F Christie (Australia) O Gadecki	7	4	[10]
(France) T Andrianjafitrimo (France) F Ferro	5	6	[4]
3	(United Kingdom) E Appleton (China) Q Tang	6	6
(France) S Janicijevic (France) C Monnet	4	4
(United Kingdom) A Barnett (France) E Lechemia	4	6	[10]
(Australia) P Hon (Belgium) Y Wickmayer	6	4	[8]
(France) E Jacquemot (France) M Rouvroy	3	2
(United States) C Corley (United States) C Rosca	6	6
(France) L Jeanjean (France) J Ponchet	6	3	[10]
4	A Anshba (Germany) N Noha Akugue	1	6	[3]
WC	(France) É Dartron (France) T Rakotomanga Rajaonah	7^{7}	7^{7}
(France) E Cascino; A Charaeva	6^{5}	6^{5}
(Canada) V Mboko (Canada) M Stakusic
2	(Georgia (country)) O Kalashnikova (Italy) A Moratelli	w/o

Quarterfinals
1	(United Kingdom) M Lumsden (Japan) M Ninomiya	6	6
(United Kingdom) F Christie (Australia) O Gadecki	2	0
3	(United Kingdom) E Appleton (China) Q Tang	7	1	[9]
(United Kingdom) A Barnett (France) E Lechemia	5	6	[11]
(United States) C Corley (United States) C Rosca	2	6	[5]
(France) L Jeanjean (France) J Ponchet	6	2	[10]
WC	(France) É Dartron (France) T Rakotomanga Rajaonah	6^{4}	3
2	(Georgia (country)) O Kalashnikova (Italy) A Moratelli	7^{7}	6

Semifinals
1	(United Kingdom) M Lumsden (Japan) M Ninomiya	6	6
(United Kingdom) A Barnett (France) E Lechemia	2	3
(France) L Jeanjean (France) J Ponchet	4	5
2	(Georgia (country)) O Kalashnikova (Italy) A Moratelli	6	7

Final
1	(United Kingdom) M Lumsden (Japan) M Ninomiya	7	6
2	(Georgia (country)) O Kalashnikova (Italy) A Moratelli	5	2
