= 2023 Engie Open de l'Isère – Singles =

Singles
- 2023 Engie Open de l'Isère

Final
- Champion: (France) Océane Dodin
- Runner-up: (Switzerland) Simona Waltert
- Score: 6–2, 7–5

Events
Singles	Doubles
← 2022 ·	Open de l'Isère	· 2024 →

Katie Boulter was the defending champion but chose not to participate.

Océane Dodin won the title, defeating Simona Waltert in the final, 6–2, 7–5.

== Seeds ==
1. (France) Clara Burel (quarterfinals)
2. (France) Océane Dodin (champion)
3. (Switzerland) Simona Waltert (final)
4. (France) Elsa Jacquemot (first round)
5. Oksana Selekhmeteva (semifinals)
6. (France) Chloé Paquet (first round, retired)
7. (France) Jessika Ponchet (semifinals)
8. (Romania) Irina Bara (second round)

== Draw ==
=== Key ===
- Q = Qualifier
- WC = Wild card
- LL = Lucky loser
- Alt = Alternate
- SE = Special exempt
- PR = Protected ranking
- ITF = ITF entry
- JE = Junior exempt
- w/o = Walkover
- r = Retired
- d = Defaulted
- SR = Special ranking

=== Finals ===
Semifinals
5	Oksana Selekhmeteva	3	1
3	(Switzerland) Simona Waltert	6	6
7	(France) Jessika Ponchet	4	6	2
2	(France) Océane Dodin	6	4	6

Final
3	(Switzerland) Simona Waltert	2	5
2	(France) Océane Dodin	6	7

=== Top half ===
First round
1	(France) C Burel	6	7^{7}
K Dmitruk	4	6^{3}
M Timofeeva	6	6
WC	(France) L Petretic	2	1
D Astakhova	3	2
SR	S Lansere	6	6
(Romania) A Prisăcariu	2	4
5	O Selekhmeteva	6	6
3	(Switzerland) S Waltert	6	4	6
(Belgium) M Kempen	3	6	3
(Greece) S Sakellaridi	3	3
Q	(France) É Dartron	6	6
WC	(France) N Berecoechea	1	3
(Liechtenstein) K von Deichmann	6	6
Q	(United Kingdom) E Maloney	7^{7}	4
6	(France) C Paquet	6^{5}	2^{r}

Second round
1	(France) C Burel	7^{7}	1	6
M Timofeeva	6^{3}	6	2
SR	S Lansere	7	4	5
5	O Selekhmeteva	5	6	7
3	(Switzerland) S Waltert	6	2	6
Q	(France) É Dartron	4	6	4
(Liechtenstein) K von Deichmann	6	6
Q	(United Kingdom) E Maloney	0	2

Quarterfinals
1	(France) C Burel	6	5	2
5	O Selekhmeteva	3	7	6
3	(Switzerland) S Waltert	6	7
(Liechtenstein) K von Deichmann	4	5

Semifinals
5	O Selekhmeteva	3	1
3	(Switzerland) S Waltert	6	6

=== Bottom half ===
First round
7	(France) J Ponchet	6	6
Q	(France) M Léonard	3	0
(France) L Nguyen Tan	1	2
Q	(France) G Desperrier	6	6
WC	(France) E Léné	6	6
Q	(Czech Republic) A Laboutková	2	2
Q	(France) M Rouvroy	3	6	6
4	(France) E Jacquemot	6	3	1
8	(Romania) I Bara	7^{7}	6
WC	(France) A Monnot	6^{2}	2
(Turkey) Z Sönmez	4	6	4
(France) A Albié	6	4	6
(Czech Republic) L Havlíčková	6^{3}	4
Q	(Italy) G Gatto-Monticone	7^{7}	6
Q	(Germany) K Kanev	2	4
2	(France) O Dodin	6	6

Second round
7	(France) J Ponchet	6	6
Q	(France) G Desperrier	2	4
WC	(France) E Léné	1	4
Q	(France) M Rouvroy	6	6
8	(Romania) I Bara	0	1
(France) A Albié	6	6
Q	(Italy) G Gatto-Monticone	0	2
2	(France) O Dodin	6	6

Quarterfinals
7	(France) J Ponchet	6	6
Q	(France) M Rouvroy	1	4
(France) A Albié	2	1
2	(France) O Dodin	6	6

Semifinals
7	(France) J Ponchet	4	6	2
2	(France) O Dodin	6	4	6
