= 2024 L'Open 35 de Saint-Malo – Singles =

Singles
- 2024 L'Open 35 de Saint-Malo

Final
- Champion: (France) Loïs Boisson
- Runner-up: (France) Chloé Paquet
- Score: 4–6, 7–6^{(7–3)}, 6–3

Details
- Draw: 32

Events
Singles	Doubles
- L'Open 35 de Saint-Malo

Loïs Boisson won the singles title at the 2024 L'Open 35 de Saint-Malo, defeating Chloé Paquet in the final, 4–6, 7–6^{(7–3)}, 6–3.

Sloane Stephens was the reigning champion, but did not participate this year.

== Seeds ==
1. (France) Clara Burel (quarterfinals)
2. Anna Blinkova (first round)
3. (United States) Peyton Stearns (quarterfinals)
4. (France) Varvara Gracheva (first round)
5. (Australia) Daria Saville (second round)
6. (Mexico) Renata Zarazúa (first round)
7. (United States) Katie Volynets (quarterfinals)
8. (France) Alizé Cornet (semifinals)

== Draw ==
Key

- Q = Qualifier
- WC = Wild card
- LL = Lucky loser
- Alt = Alternate
- ITF = ITF entry
- PR = Protected ranking
- SR = Special ranking
- SE = Special exempt
- JE = Junior exempt
- JR = Junior Accelerator Programme entrant
- CO = College Accelerator Programme entrant
- NG = Next Gen Accelerator Program entrant
- w/o = Walkover
- r = Retired
- d = Defaulted

=== Finals ===
Semifinals
(Switzerland) Céline Naef	3	4
(France) Chloé Paquet	6	6
WC	(France) Loïs Boisson	3	6	6
8	(France) Alizé Cornet	6	1	4

Final
(France) Chloé Paquet	6	6^{3}	3
WC	(France) Loïs Boisson	4	7^{7}	6

=== Top half ===
First round
1	(France) C Burel	6	6
(France) E Jacquemot	3	3
(Poland) K Kawa	6^{4}	6	4
(Turkey) Z Sönmez	7^{7}	4	6
A Zakharova	2	1
(Switzerland) C Naef	6	6
P Kudermetova	4	4
5	(Australia) D Saville	6	6
3	(United States) P Stearns	6	6
LL	(France) M Rouvroy	4	1
(Australia) T Preston	6	6
(France) K Mladenovic	0	2
Q	I Shymanovich	4	7	6
A Tikhonova	6	5	2
(France) C Paquet	3	6	6
6	(Mexico) R Zarazúa	6	0	4

Second round
1	(France) C Burel	6^{4}	7	6
(Turkey) Z Sönmez	7^{7}	5	3
(Switzerland) C Naef	6	6
5	(Australia) D Saville	2	2
3	(United States) P Stearns	6	3	6
(Australia) T Preston	1	6	1
Q	I Shymanovich	4	3
(France) C Paquet	6	6

Quarterfinals
1	(France) C Burel	3	3
(Switzerland) C Naef	6	6
3	(United States) P Stearns	5	6	0
(France) C Paquet	7	2	6

Semifinals
(Switzerland) C Naef	3	4
(France) C Paquet	6	6

=== Bottom half ===
First round
7	(United States) K Volynets	6	6
(Australia) O Gadecki	4	1
WC	(France) C Monnet	6	6
(France) S Janicijevic	3	4
Q	(Argentina) S Sierra	6	6
Q	(United Kingdom) E Silva	4	2
WC	(France) L Boisson	6	7
4/WC	(France) V Gracheva	4	5
8	(France) A Cornet	6	6
Q	(France) A Lew Yan Foon	1	4
(United States) L Davis	1	2
(France) F Ferro	6	6
(Australia) A Sharma	4	2
(Colombia) E Arango	6	6
(France) J Ponchet	7	6
2	A Blinkova	5	3

Second round
7	(United States) K Volynets	6	6
WC	(France) C Monnet	4	3
Q	(Argentina) S Sierra	1	0
WC	(France) L Boisson	6	6
8	(France) A Cornet	6	5	6
(France) F Ferro	4	7	3
(Colombia) E Arango	3	4
(France) J Ponchet	6	6

Quarterfinals
7	(United States) K Volynets	7	2	2
WC	(France) L Boisson	5	6	6
8	(France) A Cornet	4	6	6
(France) J Ponchet	6	2	2

Semifinals
WC	(France) L Boisson	3	6	6
8	(France) A Cornet	6	1	4

== Qualifying ==
=== Seeds ===
1. (Argentina) Solana Sierra (qualified)
2. Iryna Shymanovich (qualified)
3. Sofya Lansere (first round)
4. (France) Manon Léonard (first round)
5. (France) Margaux Rouvroy (qualifying competition, lucky loser)
6. (Italy) Camilla Rosatello (first round, retired)
7. (United Kingdom) Eden Silva (qualified)
8. (France) Emma Léné (qualifying competition)

=== Qualifiers ===
1. (Argentina) Solana Sierra
2. Iryna Shymanovich
3. (France) Astrid Lew Yan Foon
4. (United Kingdom) Eden Silva

=== Lucky loser ===
1. (France) Margaux Rouvroy

=== Qualifying draw ===
==== First qualifier ====
First round					Qualifying competition
					1	(Argentina) Solana Sierra	6	7^{7}
					5	(France) Margaux Rouvroy	3	6^{5}
	Amina Anshba	3	6	5	5	(France) Margaux Rouvroy	3	6^{5}
5	(France) Margaux Rouvroy	6	4	7

==== Second qualifier ====
First round				Qualifying competition
				2	Iryna Shymanovich	6	7
					(France) Diana Martynov	2	5
	(France) Diana Martynov	7^{7}	0		(France) Diana Martynov	2	5
6	(Italy) Camilla Rosatello	6^{3}	0^{r}

==== Third qualifier ====
First round
3	Sofya Lansere	3	6	6^{1}
(France) Astrid Lew Yan Foon	6	4	7^{7}
(Italy) Angelica Moratelli	3	6^{3}
8	(France) Emma Léné	6	7^{7}

Qualifying competition
(France) Astrid Lew Yan Foon	6	6
8	(France) Emma Léné	2	3

==== Fourth qualifier ====
First round
4	(France) Manon Léonard	6	4	0
(Netherlands) Bibiane Schoofs	4	6	6
(France) Eleejah Inisan	2	2
7	(United Kingdom) Eden Silva	6	6

Qualifying competition
(Netherlands) Bibiane Schoofs	6	3	6^{5}
7	(United Kingdom) Eden Silva	4	6	7^{7}
