= 2025 L'Open 35 de Saint-Malo – Singles =

Singles
- 2025 L'Open 35 de Saint-Malo

Final
- Champion: (Japan) Naomi Osaka
- Runner-up: (Slovenia) Kaja Juvan
- Score: 6–1, 7–5

Details
- Draw: 32

Events
Singles	Doubles
- L'Open 35 de Saint-Malo

Naomi Osaka won the title, defeating Kaja Juvan 6–1, 7–5 in the final. It was Osaka's first title below the WTA Tour level, first professional title on clay courts, and her first title since winning the 2021 Australian Open. It was her first appearance in a tournament below WTA Tour level since 2015.

Loïs Boisson was the defending champion, but lost in the first round to Léolia Jeanjean.

== Seeds ==
1. (United States) McCartney Kessler (quarterfinals)
2. (Japan) Naomi Osaka (champion)
3. (United States) Katie Volynets (quarterfinals)
4. (United States) Caroline Dolehide (second round)
5. (Belgium) Greet Minnen (first round)
6. (Australia) Olivia Gadecki (second round)
7. (Switzerland) Viktorija Golubic (semifinals)
8. (China) Yuan Yue (withdrew)

== Draw ==
Key

- Q = Qualifier
- WC = Wild card
- LL = Lucky loser
- Alt = Alternate
- ITF = ITF entry
- PR = Protected ranking
- SR = Special ranking
- SE = Special exempt
- JE = Junior exempt
- JR = Junior Accelerator Programme entrant
- CO = College Accelerator Programme entrant
- NG = Next Gen Accelerator Program entrant
- w/o = Walkover
- r = Retired
- d = Defaulted

=== Finals ===
Semifinals
7	(Switzerland) Viktorija Golubic	4	4
PR	(Slovenia) Kaja Juvan	6	6
(France) Léolia Jeanjean	2	6	0
2/WC	(Japan) Naomi Osaka	6	4	6

Final
PR	(Slovenia) Kaja Juvan	1	5
2/WC	(Japan) Naomi Osaka	6	7

=== Top half ===
First round
1/WC	(United States) M Kessler	6	6
Q	(France) Y Bartashevich	4	1
Q	(France) T Andrianjafitrimo	6	4	1
WC	(France) T Rakotomanga Rajaonah	3	6	6
(Spain) N Párrizas Díaz	0	3
(France) C Paquet	6	6
(France) S Janicijevic	6^{3}	5
7	(Switzerland) V Golubic	7^{7}	7
3	(United States) K Volynets	6	6
A Zakharova	4	0
(Australia) P Hon	2	3
(United States) V Lepchenko	6	6
(Switzerland) C Naef	6	6^{2}	6
Q	(France) S Cakarevic	3	7^{7}	3
PR	(Slovenia) K Juvan	6	6^{2}	6
5	(Belgium) G Minnen	1	7^{7}	3

Second round
1/WC	(United States) M Kessler	7^{8}	6
WC	(France) T Rakotomanga Rajaonah	6^{6}	1
(France) C Paquet	6	1	3
7	(Switzerland) V Golubic	3	6	6
3	(United States) K Volynets	6	6
(United States) V Lepchenko	1	2
(Switzerland) C Naef	6	2	2
PR	(Slovenia) K Juvan	2	6	6

Quarterfinals
1/WC	(United States) M Kessler	3	5
7	(Switzerland) V Golubic	6	7
3	(United States) K Volynets	1	6	1
PR	(Slovenia) K Juvan	6	3	6

Semifinals
7	(Switzerland) V Golubic	4	4
PR	(Slovenia) K Juvan	6	6

=== Bottom half ===
First round
LL	(Germany) N Noha Akugue	6	6^{9}	3
(France) F Ferro	4	7^{11}	6
(China) S Wei	3	6^{5}
Q	(France) É Dartron	6	7^{7}
(France) L Jeanjean	6	4	6
WC	(France) L Boisson	3	6	4
(France) M Léonard	5	7	2
4	(United States) C Dolehide	7	5	6
6	(Australia) O Gadecki	6	2	6
(Canada) V Mboko	2	6	3
(France) E Jacquemot	6	4	6
(Canada) M Stakusic	4	6	4
(France) J Ponchet	2	2
(France) D Parry	6	6
(Croatia) P Marčinko	2	1
2/WC	(Japan) N Osaka	6	6

Second round
(France) F Ferro	6	6
Q	(France) É Dartron	4	4
(France) L Jeanjean	6	1	6
4	(United States) C Dolehide	3	6	1
6	(Australia) O Gadecki	2	5
(France) E Jacquemot	6	7
(France) D Parry	6	3	4
2/WC	(Japan) N Osaka	2	6	6

Quarterfinals
(France) F Ferro	5	3
(France) L Jeanjean	7	6
(France) E Jacquemot	3	4
2/WC	(Japan) N Osaka	6	6

Semifinals
(France) L Jeanjean	2	6	0
2/WC	(Japan) N Osaka	6	4	6

== Qualifying ==
=== Seeds ===
1. (France) Tessah Andrianjafitrimo (qualified)
2. (Germany) Noma Noha Akugue (qualifying competition, lucky loser)
3. (France) Carole Monnet (first round)
4. Alina Charaeva (first round)
5. (Germany) Caroline Werner (first round)
6. (France) Émeline Dartron (qualified)
7. (France) Sara Cakarevic (qualified)
8. (United Kingdom) Emily Appleton (qualifying competition)

=== Qualifiers ===
1. (France) Tessah Andrianjafitrimo
2. (France) Émeline Dartron
3. (France) Sara Cakarevic
4. (France) Yara Bartashevich

=== Lucky loser ===
1. (Germany) Noma Noha Akugue

=== Qualifying draw ===
==== First qualifier ====
First round
1	(France) Tessah Andrianjafitrimo	6	2	6
WC	(France) Sarah Iliev	3	6	4
(France) Alyssa Réguer	6	1	4
8	(United Kingdom) Emily Appleton	1	6	6

Qualifying competition
1	(France) Tessah Andrianjafitrimo	6	6
8	(United Kingdom) Emily Appleton	3	2

==== Second qualifier ====
First round
2	(Germany) Noma Noha Akugue	6	6
Amina Anshba	2	2
(United Kingdom) Freya Christie	3	2
6	(France) Émeline Dartron	6	6

Qualifying competition
2	(Germany) Noma Noha Akugue	6^{5}	5
6	(France) Émeline Dartron	7^{7}	7

==== Third qualifier ====
First round
3	(France) Carole Monnet	2	4
WC	(France) Eleejah Inisan	6	6
(Italy) Jessica Pieri	6^{3}	4
7	(France) Sara Cakarevic	7^{7}	6

Qualifying competition
WC	(France) Eleejah Inisan	6^{3}	6	4
7	(France) Sara Cakarevic	7^{7}	3	6

==== Fourth qualifier ====
First round
4	Alina Charaeva	5	6	4
(France) Diana Martynov	7	2	6
(France) Yara Bartashevich	6	3	6
5	(Germany) Caroline Werner	1	6	1

Qualifying competition
(France) Diana Martynov	2	3
(France) Yara Bartashevich	6	6
