= 2024 Engie Open de l'Isère =

Tennis tournament

- Date: 5–11 February 2024
- Edition: 14th
- Category: ITF Women's World Tennis Tour
- Prize money: $60,000
- Surface: Hard / Indoor
- Location: Grenoble, France

Champions

Singles
- Aliona Falei

Doubles
- (United Kingdom) Emily Appleton / (United Kingdom) Freya Christie
| ← 2023 · | Open de l'Isère | · 2025 → |

The 2024 Engie Open de l'Isère was a professional tennis tournament played on indoor hard courts. It was the fourteenth edition of the tournament, which was part of the 2024 ITF Women's World Tennis Tour. It took place in Grenoble, France, between 5 and 11 February 2024.

== Champions ==
=== Singles ===
- Aliona Falei def. (France) Manon Léonard, 6–1, 4–6, 6–4

=== Doubles ===
- (United Kingdom) Emily Appleton / (United Kingdom) Freya Christie def. (United Kingdom) Sarah Beth Grey / (United Kingdom) Eden Silva, 3–6, 6–1, [11–9]

== Singles main draw entrants ==
=== Seeds ===
| Country | Player | Rank | Seed |
|---|---|---|---|
| CZE | Tereza Martincová | 155 | 1 |
| GER | Ella Seidel | 160 | 2 |
| FRA | Elsa Jacquemot | 167 | 3 |
| FRA | Alice Robbe | 225 | 4 |
| FRA | Harmony Tan | 233 | 5 |
| | Julia Avdeeva | 251 | 6 |
| FRA | Margaux Rouvroy | 261 | 7 |
| | Aliona Falei | 264 | 8 |

- Rankings are as of 29 January 2024.

=== Other entrants ===
The following players received wildcards into the singles main draw:

- (France) Emma Léné
- (France) Astrid Lew Fan Yoon
- (France) Amandine Monnot
- (France) Daphnée Mpetshi Perricard

The following player received entry into the singles main draw using a special ranking:

- (Poland) Maja Chwalińska

The following players received entry from the qualifying draw:

- (United Kingdom) Emily Appleton
- (United Kingdom) Freya Christie
- (United Kingdom) Sarah Beth Grey
- Alevtina Ibragimova
- (Germany) Kathleen Kanev
- Anastasia Kovaleva
- Ekaterina Maklakova
- (Germany) Tayisiya Morderger
