= 2024 Engie Open de l'Isère – Doubles =

Doubles
- 2024 Engie Open de l'Isère

Final
- Champions: (United Kingdom) Emily Appleton (United Kingdom) Freya Christie
- Runners-up: (United Kingdom) Sarah Beth Grey (United Kingdom) Eden Silva
- Score: 3–6, 6–1, [11–9]

Events
Singles	Doubles
← 2023 ·	Open de l'Isère	· 2025 →

Freya Christie and Ali Collins were the defending champions but Collins chose not to participate.

Christie partnered alongside Emily Appleton and successfully defended her title, defeating Sarah Beth Grey and Eden Silva in an all-British final, 3–6, 6–1, [11–9].

== Seeds ==
1. (United Kingdom) Alicia Barnett / (Czech Republic) Anastasia Dețiuc (semifinals)
2. (United Kingdom) Maia Lumsden / (France) Jessika Ponchet (semifinals)
3. (United Kingdom) Emily Appleton / (United Kingdom) Freya Christie (champions)
4. (United Kingdom) Sarah Beth Grey / (United Kingdom) Eden Silva (final)

== Draw ==
=== Key ===
- Q = Qualifier
- WC = Wild card
- LL = Lucky loser
- Alt = Alternate
- SE = Special exempt
- PR = Protected ranking
- ITF = ITF entry
- JE = Junior exempt
- w/o = Walkover
- r = Retired
- d = Defaulted
- SR = Special ranking

First round
(Germany) T Morderger (Germany) Y Morderger	5	3
A Gureva; E Maklakova	7	6
4	(United Kingdom) SB Grey (United Kingdom) E Silva	6	7^{9}
A Ibragimova; A Kovaleva	0	6^{7}
(France) M Léonard (France) A Robbe	6	6
(France) A Monnot (France) M Villet	0	1
(France) TS Rakotomanga Rajaonah (France) M Rouvroy	6	4	[10]
(France) E Salas (France) M Szostak	1	6	[5]
(France) E Cascino (Turkey) B Cengiz	2	0
3	(United Kingdom) E Appleton (United Kingdom) F Christie	6	6
(Ukraine) M Kolb (Ukraine) N Kolb	2	3
(Germany) E Seidel (Liechtenstein) K von Deichmann	6	6

Quarterfinals
1	(United Kingdom) A Barnett (Czech Republic) A Dețiuc	6	6
A Gureva; E Maklakova	4	0
4	(United Kingdom) SB Grey (United Kingdom) E Silva	6	6
(France) M Léonard (France) A Robbe	4	1
(France) TS Rakotomanga Rajaonah (France) M Rouvroy	1	0^{r}
3	(United Kingdom) E Appleton (United Kingdom) F Christie	6	0
(Germany) E Seidel (Liechtenstein) K von Deichmann	1	3
2	(United Kingdom) M Lumsden (France) J Ponchet	6	6

Semifinals
1	(United Kingdom) A Barnett (Czech Republic) A Dețiuc	3	4
4	(United Kingdom) SB Grey (United Kingdom) E Silva	6	6
3	(United Kingdom) E Appleton (United Kingdom) F Christie	6^{7}	7^{8}	[10]
2	(United Kingdom) M Lumsden (France) J Ponchet	7^{9}	6^{6}	[3]

Final
4	(United Kingdom) SB Grey (United Kingdom) E Silva	6	1	[9]
3	(United Kingdom) E Appleton (United Kingdom) F Christie	3	6	[11]
