= 2026 L'Open 35 de Saint-Malo – Singles =

Singles
- 2026 L'Open 35 de Saint-Malo

Final
- Champion: (Japan) Moyuka Uchijima
- Runner-up: (Czech Republic) Tereza Valentová
- Score: 6–7^{(2–7)}, 6–3, 6–1

Details
- Draw: 32

Events
| Singles | Doubles |
- L'Open 35 de Saint-Malo

Naomi Osaka was the reigning champion, but did not participate this year.

Moyuka Uchijima won the title, defeating Tereza Valentová 6–7^{(2–7)}, 6–3, 6–1 in the final.

== Seeds ==
1. (Czech Republic) Tereza Valentová (final)
2. (Australia) Talia Gibson (first round)
3. (France) Elsa Jacquemot (first round)
4. (Switzerland) Viktorija Golubic (quarterfinals)
5. Anna Blinkova (semifinals)
6. (Austria) Lilli Tagger (quarterfinals)
7. (Japan) Moyuka Uchijima (champion)
8. (France) Diane Parry (first round)

== Draw ==
Key

- Q = Qualifier
- WC = Wild card
- LL = Lucky loser
- Alt = Alternate
- ITF = ITF entry
- PR = Protected ranking
- SR = Special ranking
- SE = Special exempt
- JE = Junior exempt
- JR = Junior Accelerator Programme entrant
- CO = College Accelerator Programme entrant
- NG = Next Gen Accelerator Program entrant
- w/o = Walkover
- r = Retired
- d = Defaulted

=== Finals ===
Semifinals
1 | (Czech Republic) Tereza Valentová | 6 | 6
5 | Anna Blinkova | 3 | 2
(France) Jessika Ponchet | 4 | 6^{3}
7 | (Japan) Moyuka Uchijima | 6 | 7^{7}

Final
1 | (Czech Republic) Tereza Valentová | 7^{7} | 3 | 1
7 | (Japan) Moyuka Uchijima | 6^{2} | 6 | 6

=== Top half ===
First round
1 | (Czech Republic) T Valentová | 6 | 6
PR | (United States) S Stephens | 4 | 1
(United States) C Liu | 2 | 6 | 6
(France) A Ramé | 6 | 1 | 3
A Korneeva | 2 | 3
Q | (France) A Monnot | 6 | 6
(France) T Rakotomanga Rajaonah | 0 | 4
6 | (Austria) L Tagger | 6 | 6
3 | (France) E Jacquemot | 6^{3} | 6^{5}
(Canada) B Andreescu | 7^{7} | 7^{7}
(New Zealand) L Sun | 6 | 3 | 4
(China) Y Yuan | 4 | 6 | 6
LL | (France) Y Bartashevich | 4 | 0
(Switzerland) C Naef | 6 | 6
Q | (France) J Belgraver | 6^{1} | 1
5 | A Blinkova | 7^{7} | 6

Second round
1 | (Czech Republic) T Valentová | 6 | 2 | 6
(United States) C Liu | 4 | 6 | 2
Q | (France) A Monnot | 4 | 1
6 | (Austria) L Tagger | 6 | 6
(Canada) B Andreescu | 3 | 6 | 0
(China) Y Yuan | 6 | 3 | 6
(Switzerland) C Naef | 4 | 6 | 1
5 | A Blinkova | 6 | 2 | 6

Quarterfinals
1 | (Czech Republic) T Valentová | 7 | 7
6 | (Austria) L Tagger | 5 | 5
(China) Y Yuan | 3 | 6 | 2
5 | A Blinkova | 6 | 4 | 6

Semifinals
1 | (Czech Republic) T Valentová | 6 | 6
5 | A Blinkova | 3 | 2

=== Bottom half ===
First round
8/WC | (France) D Parry | 3 | 6^{5}
LL | (Morocco) Y Kabbaj | 6 | 7^{7}
(France) J Ponchet | 6 | 0
(France) F Ferro | 1 | 1^{r}
WC | (France) C Paquet | 4 | 2
(United States) W Osuigwe | 6 | 6
WC | (France) C Burel | 3 | 2
4 | (Switzerland) V Golubic | 6 | 6
7 | (Japan) M Uchijima | 6 | 3 | 6
WC | (France) K Efremova | 4 | 6 | 3
Q | (France) L Nguyen Tan | 7^{7} | 6
PR | (France) A Tubello | 6^{4} | 3
(Belgium) S Costoulas | 7 | 7^{7}
Q | (Turkey) A Aksu | 5 | 6^{4}
(France) L Jeanjean | 6^{5} | 6 | 7
2 | (Australia) T Gibson | 7^{7} | 2 | 5

Second round
LL | (Morocco) Y Kabbaj | 2 | 4
(France) J Ponchet | 6 | 6
(United States) W Osuigwe | 6 | 2 | 2
4 | (Switzerland) V Golubic | 2 | 6 | 6
7 | (Japan) M Uchijima | 7 | 6
Q | (France) L Nguyen Tan | 5 | 2
(Belgium) S Costoulas | 4 | 7^{7} | 6
(France) L Jeanjean | 6 | 6^{1} | 1

Quarterfinals
(France) J Ponchet | 4 | 6 | 6
4 | (Switzerland) V Golubic | 6 | 4 | 2
7 | (Japan) M Uchijima | 6 | 6
(Belgium) S Costoulas | 4 | 1

Semifinals
(France) J Ponchet | 4 | 6^{3}
7 | (Japan) M Uchijima | 6 | 7^{7}

== Qualifying ==
=== Seeds ===
1. (France) Julie Belgraver (qualified)
2. (Turkey) Ayla Aksu (qualified)
3. (Brazil) Carolina Alves (first round)
4. (France) Manon Léonard (first round, retired)
5. (France) Amandine Monnot (qualified)
6. (Morocco) Yasmine Kabbaj (qualifying competition, lucky loser)
7. (Greece) Sapfo Sakellaridi (first round)
8. (Turkey) Çağla Büyükakçay (first round)

=== Qualifiers ===
1. (France) Julie Belgraver
2. (Turkey) Ayla Aksu
3. (France) Amandine Monnot
4. (France) Lucie Nguyen Tan

=== Lucky losers ===
1. (France) Yara Bartashevich
2. (Morocco) Yasmine Kabbaj

=== Qualifying draw ===
==== First qualifier ====
First round
1 | (France) Julie Belgraver | 6 | 6
(France) Astrid Lew Yan Foon | 3 | 3
(France) Yara Bartashevich | 6 | 1 | 6
7 | (Greece) Sapfo Sakellaridi | 4 | 6 | 4

Qualifying competition
1 | (France) Julie Belgraver | 5 | 6 | 6
(France) Yara Bartashevich | 7 | 3 | 3

==== Second qualifier ====
First round
2 | (Turkey) Ayla Aksu | 6 | 6
Ksenia Zaytseva | 1 | 1
Ekaterina Ovcharenko | 6 | 6
8 | (Turkey) Çağla Büyükakçay | 3 | 2

Qualifying competition
2 | (Turkey) Ayla Aksu | 6 | 6
Ekaterina Ovcharenko | 4 | 1

==== Third qualifier ====
First round
3 | (Brazil) Carolina Alves | 4 | 3
(Poland) Weronika Falkowska | 6 | 6
(France) Diana Martynov | 4 | 2
5 | (France) Amandine Monnot | 6 | 6

Qualifying competition
(Poland) Weronika Falkowska | 3 | 4
5 | (France) Amandine Monnot | 6 | 6

==== Fourth qualifier ====
First round
4 | (France) Manon Léonard | 5 | 0^{r}
WC | (France) Lucie Nguyen Tan | 7 | 0
WC | (France) Eleejah Inisan | 7 | 5 | 5
6 | (Morocco) Yasmine Kabbaj | 5 | 7 | 7

Qualifying competition
WC | (France) Lucie Nguyen Tan | 7 | 6
6 | (Morocco) Yasmine Kabbaj | 5 | 1
