= 2023 Engie Open de l'Isère – Doubles =

Doubles
- 2023 Engie Open de l'Isère

Final
- Champions: (United Kingdom) Freya Christie (United Kingdom) Ali Collins
- Runners-up: Sofya Lansere; Maria Timofeeva
- Score: 6–4, 6–3

Events
Singles	Doubles
← 2022 ·	Open de l'Isère	· 2024 →

Yuriko Miyazaki and Prarthana Thombare were the defending champions but chose not to participate.

Freya Christie and Ali Collins won the title, defeating Sofya Lansere and Maria Timofeeva in the final, 6–4, 6–3.

== Seeds ==
1. (United Kingdom) Freya Christie / (United Kingdom) Ali Collins (champions)
2. Darya Astakhova / Oksana Selekhmeteva (semifinals)
3. Sofya Lansere / Maria Timofeeva (final)
4. (Belgium) Magali Kempen / (Switzerland) Xenia Knoll (semifinals)

== Draw ==
=== Key ===
- Q = Qualifier
- WC = Wild card
- LL = Lucky loser
- Alt = Alternate
- SE = Special exempt
- PR = Protected ranking
- ITF = ITF entry
- JE = Junior exempt
- w/o = Walkover
- r = Retired
- d = Defaulted
- SR = Special ranking

First round
1	(United Kingdom) F Christie (United Kingdom) A Collins	6	7^{7}
K Dmitruk (Liechtenstein) K von Deichmann	2	6^{3}
(France) E Léné (France) L Petretic	3	2
(France) E Jacquemot (France) J Ponchet	6	6
4	(Belgium) M Kempen (Switzerland) X Knoll	6^{2}	6	[10]
(France) O Babel (France) L Nguyen Tan	7^{7}	3	[8]
(France) F Brugnone (France) É Dartron	2	4
(Romania) I Bara (France) A Hesse	6	6
(Romania) IG Ghioroaie (Romania) A Prisăcariu	7^{7}	4	[6]
(France) A Albié (France) M Rouvroy	6^{4}	6	[10]
(Czech Republic) A Laboutková (United Kingdom) E Maloney	0	2
3	S Lansere; M Timofeeva	6	6
(Croatia) M Dražić (Greece) S Sakellaridi	3	7	[11]
(France) A Monnot (France) M Villet	6	5	[9]
(France) N Berecoechea (Germany) K Kanev	3	1
2	D Astakhova; O Selekhmeteva	6	6

Quarterfinals
1	(United Kingdom) F Christie (United Kingdom) A Collins	7	3	[10]
(France) E Jacquemot (France) J Ponchet	5	6	[3]
4	(Belgium) M Kempen (Switzerland) X Knoll	7^{7}	6
(Romania) I Bara (France) A Hesse	6^{1}	2
(France) A Albié (France) M Rouvroy	5	2
3	S Lansere; M Timofeeva	7	6
(Croatia) M Dražić (Greece) S Sakellaridi	4	4
2	D Astakhova; O Selekhmeteva	6	6

Semifinals
1	(United Kingdom) F Christie (United Kingdom) A Collins	7	7
4	(Belgium) M Kempen (Switzerland) X Knoll	5	5
3	S Lansere; M Timofeeva	6	4	[10]
2	D Astakhova; O Selekhmeteva	3	6	[5]

Final
1	(United Kingdom) F Christie (United Kingdom) A Collins	6	6
3	S Lansere; M Timofeeva	4	3
