= 2023 Open Saint-Gaudens Occitanie – Doubles =

Doubles
- 2023 Open Saint-Gaudens Occitanie

Final
- Champions: Sofya Lansere (Czech Republic) Anna Sisková
- Runners-up: (Colombia) María Herazo González (United States) Adriana Reami
- Score: 6–0, 3–6, [10–6]

Events
Singles	Doubles
← 2022 ·	Open Saint-Gaudens Occitanie	· 2024 →

Fernanda Contreras and Lulu Sun were the defending champions but chose not to participate.

Sofya Lansere and Anna Sisková won the title, defeating María Herazo González and Adriana Reami in the final, 6–0, 3–6, [10–6].

== Seeds ==
1. Sofya Lansere / (Czech Republic) Anna Sisková (champions)
2. (Colombia) María Herazo González / (United States) Adriana Reami (final)
3. (France) Lucie Nguyen Tan / (France) Lucie Wargnier (semifinals)
4. (France) Émeline Dartron / (France) Yasmine Mansouri (semifinals)

== Draw ==
=== Key ===
- Q = Qualifier
- WC = Wild card
- LL = Lucky loser
- Alt = Alternate
- SE = Special exempt
- PR = Protected ranking
- ITF = ITF entry
- JE = Junior exempt
- w/o = Walkover
- r = Retired
- d = Defaulted
- SR = Special ranking

First round

Quarterfinals
4	(France) É Dartron (France) Y Mansouri	7^{7}	6
(France) A Lew Yan Foon (France) TS Rakotomanga Rajaonah	6^{1}	3
(France) J Bornay (France) L Petretic	7	3	[6]
3	(France) L Nguyen Tan (France) L Wargnier	5	6	[10]

Semifinals
1	S Lansere (Czech Republic) A Sisková	6	6
4	(France) É Dartron (France) Y Mansouri	4	1
3	(France) L Nguyen Tan (France) L Wargnier	4	4
2	(Colombia) M Herazo González (United States) A Reami	6	6

Final
1	S Lansere (Czech Republic) A Sisková	6	3	[10]
2	(Colombia) M Herazo González (United States) A Reami	0	6	[6]
