= 2024 Open Saint-Gaudens Occitanie =

Tennis tournament

- Date: 6–12 May 2024
- Edition: 27th
- Category: ITF Women's World Tennis Tour
- Prize money: $60,000
- Surface: Clay / Outdoor
- Location: Saint-Gaudens, France

Champions

Singles
- (United States) Claire Liu

Doubles
- (France) Émeline Dartron / (France) Tiantsoa Sarah Rakotomanga Rajaonah
← 2023 ·	Open Saint-Gaudens Occitanie	· 2025 →

The 2024 Open Saint-Gaudens Occitanie was a professional tennis tournament played on outdoor clay courts. It was the twenty-seventh edition of the tournament, which was part of the 2024 ITF Women's World Tennis Tour. It took place in Saint-Gaudens, France, between 6 and 12 May 2024.

== Champions ==
=== Singles ===
- (United States) Claire Liu def. (France) Séléna Janicijevic, 6–1, 6–7^{(3–7)}, 6–0

=== Doubles ===
- (France) Émeline Dartron / (France) Tiantsoa Sarah Rakotomanga Rajaonah def. (France) Estelle Cascino / (France) Carole Monnet, 6–3, 1–6, [12–10]

== Singles main draw entrants ==
=== Seeds ===
Country	Player	Rank	Seed
USA	Claire Liu	115	1
FRA	Léolia Jeanjean	138	2
FRA	Jessika Ponchet	147	3
FRA	Elsa Jacquemot	158	4
AUS	Olivia Gadecki	163	5
SUI	Céline Naef	167	6
	Ekaterina Makarova	172	7
	Anastasia Tikhonova	173	8

- Rankings are as of 22 April 2024.

=== Other entrants ===
The following players received wildcards into the singles main draw:

- (France) Elsa Jacquemot
- (France) Léolia Jeanjean
- (France) ~~Kristina Mladenovic~~
- (Croatia) Tara Würth

The following players received entry from the qualifying draw:

- (France) Émeline Dartron
- (Romania) Oana Gavrilă
- (France) Astrid Lew Yan Foon
- (France) Jenny Lim
- (France) Diana Martynov
- (Switzerland) Conny Perrin
- (France) Alice Ramé
- (France) Aravane Rezaï

The following players received entry as lucky losers:

- (France) Daphnée Mpetshi Perricard
- (Georgia (country)) Sofia Shapatava
