= 2025 L'Open 35 de Saint-Malo =

- Date: 28 April – 4 May
- Edition: 30th
- Category: WTA 125
- Draw: 32S/16D
- Prize money: $115,000
- Surface: Clay
- Location: Saint-Malo, France

Champions

Singles
- (Japan) Naomi Osaka

Doubles
- (United Kingdom) Maia Lumsden / (Japan) Makoto Ninomiya
← 2024 ·	L'Open 35 de Saint-Malo	· 2026 →

The 2025 L'Open 35 de Saint-Malo was a professional women's tennis tournament played on outdoor clay courts. It was the thirtieth edition of the tournament and a part of the 2025 WTA 125 tournaments. It took place at the Tennis Club JA Saint-Malo in Saint-Malo, France between 28 April and 4 May 2025.

== Singles main-draw entrants ==
=== Seeds ===
Country	Player	Rank^{1}	Seed
USA	McCartney Kessler	43	1
JPN	Naomi Osaka	55	2
USA	Katie Volynets	70	3
USA	Caroline Dolehide	71	4
BEL	Greet Minnen	90	5
AUS	Olivia Gadecki	91	6
SUI	Viktorija Golubic	92	7
CHN	Yuan Yue	103	8

- ^{1} Rankings are as of 21 April 2025.

=== Other entrants ===
The following players received wildcards into the singles main draw:

- (France) Loïs Boisson
- (United States) McCartney Kessler
- (Japan) Naomi Osaka
- (France) Tiantsoa Sarah Rakotomanga Rajaonah

The following player received entry using a protected ranking:

- (Slovenia) Kaja Juvan

The following players received entry from the qualifying draw:

- (France) Tessah Andrianjafitrimo
- (France) Yara Bartashevich
- (France) Sara Cakarevic
- (France) Émeline Dartron

=== Withdrawals ===
Before the tournament

- (Ukraine) Anhelina Kalinina → replaced by (United States) Varvara Lepchenko

== Doubles main-draw entrants ==
=== Seeds ===
Country	Player	Country	Player	Rank	Seed
GBR	Maia Lumsden	JPN	Makoto Ninomiya	135	1
GEO	Oksana Kalashnikova	ITA	Angelica Moratelli	142	2
GBR	Emily Appleton	CHN	Tang Qianhui	153	3
	Amina Anshba	GER	Noma Noha Akugue	255	4

- Rankings as of 21 April 2025.

=== Other entrants ===
The following pair received a wildcard into the doubles main draw:

- (France) Émeline Dartron / (France) Tiantsoa Sarah Rakotomanga Rajaonah

== Champions ==
=== Singles ===
- (Japan) Naomi Osaka def. (Slovenia) Kaja Juvan, 6–1, 7–5

=== Doubles ===
- (United Kingdom) Maia Lumsden / (Japan) Makoto Ninomiya def. (Georgia (country)) Oksana Kalashnikova / (Italy) Angelica Moratelli, 7–5, 6–2
