= 2022 Engie Open de l'Isère =

Tennis tournament

- Date: 7–13 February 2022
- Edition: 12th
- Category: ITF Women's World Tennis Tour
- Prize money: $60,000
- Surface: Hard / Indoor
- Location: Grenoble, France

Champions

Singles
- (United Kingdom) Katie Boulter

Doubles
- (Japan) Yuriko Miyazaki / (India) Prarthana Thombare
← 2021 ·	Open de l'Isère	· 2023 →

The 2022 Engie Open de l'Isère was a professional tennis tournament played on indoor hard courts. It was the twelfth edition of the tournament which was part of the 2022 ITF Women's World Tennis Tour. It took place in Grenoble, France between 7 and 13 February 2022.

== Singles main-draw entrants ==
=== Seeds ===
Country	Player	Rank^{1}	Seed
NED	Arantxa Rus	64	1
ITA	Martina Trevisan	93	2
BEL	Greet Minnen	96	3
FRA	Chloé Paquet	119	4
UKR	Daria Snigur	141	5
GBR	Katie Boulter	153	6
SUI	Ylena In-Albon	156	7
RUS	Anna Blinkova	157	8

- ^{1} Rankings are as of 31 January 2022.

=== Other entrants ===
The following players received wildcards into the singles main draw:

- (France) Carole Monnet
- (France) Amandine Monnot
- (France) Mallaurie Noël
- (France) Alice Robbe

The following player received entry using a protected ranking:

- (Liechtenstein) Kathinka von Deichmann

The following players received entry from the qualifying draw:

- (United Kingdom) Alicia Barnett
- (Latvia) Kamilla Bartone
- (Philippines) Alex Eala
- (Germany) Anna Gabric
- (Russia) Ekaterina Makarova
- (France) Chloé Noël
- (France) Evita Ramirez
- (France) Margaux Rouvroy

== Champions ==
=== Singles ===
- (United Kingdom) Katie Boulter def. (Russia) Anna Blinkova, 7–6^{(7–2)}, 6–7^{(6–8)}, 6–2

=== Doubles ===
- (Japan) Yuriko Miyazaki / (India) Prarthana Thombare def. (United Kingdom) Alicia Barnett / (United Kingdom) Olivia Nicholls, 6–3, 6–3
