= 2024 L'Open 35 de Saint-Malo =

- Date: 29 April – 5 May
- Edition: 29th
- Category: WTA 125
- Draw: 32S/16D
- Prize money: $115,000
- Surface: Clay
- Location: Saint-Malo, France

Champions

Singles
- (France) Loïs Boisson

Doubles
- Amina Anshba / (Czech Republic) Anastasia Dețiuc
← 2023 ·	L'Open 35 de Saint-Malo	· 2025 →

The 2024 L'Open 35 de Saint-Malo was a professional women's tennis tournament played on outdoor clay courts. It was the twenty-ninth edition of the tournament and a part of the 2024 WTA 125 tournaments. It took place at the Tennis Club JA Saint-Malo in Saint-Malo, France between 29 April and 5 May 2024.

== Singles main-draw entrants ==
=== Seeds ===
Country	Player	Rank^{1}	Seed
FRA	Clara Burel	44	1
	Anna Blinkova	45	2
USA	Peyton Stearns	87	3
FRA	Varvara Gracheva	91	4
AUS	Daria Saville	96	5
MEX	Renata Zarazúa	103	6
USA	Katie Volynets	105	7
FRA	Alizé Cornet	107	8

- ^{1} Rankings are as of 22 April 2024.

=== Other entrants ===
The following players received wildcards into the singles main draw:

- (France) Loïs Boisson
- (France) Varvara Gracheva
- (France) Carole Monnet

The following players received entry from the qualifying draw:

- (France) Astrid Lew Yan Foon
- Iryna Shymanovich
- (Argentina) Solana Sierra
- (United Kingdom) Eden Silva

The following player received entry as a lucky loser:

- (France) Margaux Rouvroy

== Doubles main-draw entrants ==
=== Seeds ===
Country	Player	Country	Player	Rank	Seed
MEX	Giuliana Olmos		Alexandra Panova	81	1
AUS	Olivia Gadecki	GBR	Olivia Nicholls	149	2
ITA	Angelica Moratelli	ITA	Camilla Rosatello	150	3
POL	Katarzyna Kawa	NED	Bibiane Schoofs	183	4

- Rankings as of 22 April 2024.

== Champions ==
=== Singles ===
- (France) Loïs Boisson def. (France) Chloé Paquet, 4–6, 7–6^{(7–3)}, 6–3

=== Doubles ===
- Amina Anshba / (Czech Republic) Anastasia Dețiuc def. (France) Estelle Cascino / (France) Carole Monnet, 7–6^{(9–7)}, 2–6, [10–5]
