= 2026 L'Open 35 de Saint-Malo – Doubles =

Doubles
- 2026 L'Open 35 de Saint-Malo

Final
- Champions: (Netherlands) Isabelle Haverlag (United Kingdom) Maia Lumsden
- Runners-up: (Chinese Taipei) Chan Hao-ching (United States) Ivana Corley
- Score: 6–4, 6–0

Details
- Draw: 16
- Seeds: 4

Events
Singles	Doubles
- L'Open 35 de Saint-Malo

Isabelle Haverlag and Maia Lumsden won the doubles title at the 2026 L'Open 35 de Saint-Malo, defeating Chan Hao-ching and Ivana Corley in the final, 6–4, 6–0.

Lumsden and Makoto Ninomiya were the reigning champions, but Ninomiya did not participate this year.

== Seeds ==
1. (Kazakhstan) Anna Danilina / (United States) Asia Muhammad (semifinals)
2. (Japan) Eri Hozumi / (Chinese Taipei) Wu Fang-hsien (quarterfinals)
3. (Chinese Taipei) Chan Hao-ching / (United States) Ivana Corley (final)
4. (Netherlands) Isabelle Haverlag / (United Kingdom) Maia Lumsden (champions)

== Draw ==
Key

- Q = Qualifier
- WC = Wild card
- LL = Lucky loser
- Alt = Alternate
- ITF = ITF entry
- PR = Protected ranking
- SR = Special ranking
- SE = Special exempt
- JE = Junior exempt
- JR = Junior Accelerator Programme entrant
- CO = College Accelerator Programme entrant
- NG = Next Gen Accelerator Program entrant
- w/o = Walkover
- r = Retired
- d = Defaulted

=== Draw ===
First round
1	(Kazakhstan) A Danilina (United States) A Muhammad	6	6
(Chinese Taipei) I-h Cho (Chinese Taipei) Y-t Cho	2	3
I Khromacheva; K Zaytseva	6	6
(Switzerland) N Karamoko (Italy) A Moratelli	4	4
3	(Chinese Taipei) H-c Chan (United States) I Corley	6	6
WC	(France) E Inisan (France) A Lew Yan Foon	4	3
(Brazil) I Martins; E Ovcharenko	7	3	[12]
(United Kingdom) A Barnett (France) E Lechemia	5	6	[10]
(France) L Jeanjean (France) J Ponchet	6	6
(France) Y Bartashevich (France) M Mattel	3	2
(France) E Cascino (Poland) W Falkowska	4	4
4	(Netherlands) I Haverlag (United Kingdom) M Lumsden	6	6
(Belgium) P Bakhmutkina (China) S Feng	2	5
(New Zealand) L Sun (China) S Zhang	6	7
Alt	(Brazil) C Alves (United States) W Osuigwe	2	1
2	(Japan) E Hozumi (Chinese Taipei) F-h Wu	6	6

Quarterfinals
1	(Kazakhstan) A Danilina (United States) A Muhammad	6	6
I Khromacheva; K Zaytseva	2	4
3	(Chinese Taipei) H-c Chan (United States) I Corley	6	6^{5}	[10]
(Brazil) I Martins; E Ovcharenko	4	7^{7}	[7]
(France) L Jeanjean (France) J Ponchet	2	6	[4]
4	(Netherlands) I Haverlag (United Kingdom) M Lumsden	6	2	[10]
(New Zealand) L Sun (China) S Zhang	6	7^{8}
2	(Japan) E Hozumi (Chinese Taipei) F-h Wu	0	6^{6}

Semifinals
1	(Kazakhstan) A Danilina (United States) A Muhammad	4	6^{4}
3	(Chinese Taipei) H-c Chan (United States) I Corley	6	7^{7}
4	(Netherlands) I Haverlag (United Kingdom) M Lumsden	w/o
(New Zealand) L Sun (China) S Zhang

Final
3	(Chinese Taipei) H-c Chan (United States) I Corley	4	0
4	(Netherlands) I Haverlag (United Kingdom) M Lumsden	6	6
