= 2022 Engie Open de l'Isère – Singles =

Singles
- 2022 Engie Open de l'Isère

Final
- Champion: (United Kingdom) Katie Boulter
- Runner-up: (Russia) Anna Blinkova
- Score: 7–6^{(7–2)}, 6–7^{(6–8)}, 6–2

Events
Singles	Doubles
← 2021 ·	Open de l'Isère	· 2023 →

Viktorija Golubic was the defending champion but chose not to participate.

Katie Boulter won the title, defeating Anna Blinkova in the final, 7–6^{(7–2)}, 6–7^{(6–8)}, 6–2.

== Seeds ==
1. (Netherlands) Arantxa Rus (quarterfinals)
2. (Italy) Martina Trevisan (quarterfinals)
3. (Belgium) Greet Minnen (quarterfinals)
4. (France) Chloé Paquet (quarterfinals)
5. (Ukraine) Daria Snigur (second round)
6. (United Kingdom) Katie Boulter (champion)
7. (Switzerland) Ylena In-Albon (first round)
8. (Russia) Anna Blinkova (final)

== Draw ==
=== Key ===
- Q = Qualifier
- WC = Wild card
- LL = Lucky loser
- Alt = Alternate
- SE = Special exempt
- PR = Protected ranking
- ITF = ITF entry
- JE = Junior exempt
- w/o = Walkover
- r = Retired
- d = Defaulted
- SR = Special ranking

=== Finals ===
Semifinals
8	(Russia) Anna Blinkova	6	6
PR	(Liechtenstein) Kathinka von Deichmann	1	2
(Germany) Tatjana Maria	2	4
6	(United Kingdom) Katie Boulter	6	6

Final
8	(Russia) Anna Blinkova	6^{2}	7^{8}	2
6	(United Kingdom) Katie Boulter	7^{7}	6^{6}	6

=== Top half ===
First round
1	(Netherlands) A Rus	6	6
Q	(France) C Noël	3	4
WC	(France) M Noël	3	2
(France) J Ponchet	6	6
Q	(Germany) A Gabric	3	3
(France) E Jacquemot	6	6
(Germany) T Korpatsch	6	1	4
8	(Russia) A Blinkova	3	6	6
4	(France) C Paquet	6	6
Q	(Latvia) K Bartone	1	0
(Switzerland) J Züger	4	1
Q	(Philippines) A Eala	6	6
PR	(Liechtenstein) K von Deichmann	6	6
Q	(Russia) E Makarova	2	1
(Japan) Y Miyazaki	6	6
7	(Switzerland) Y In-Albon	2	4

Second round
1	(Netherlands) A Rus	6	6
(France) J Ponchet	4	4
(France) E Jacquemot	4	0
8	(Russia) A Blinkova	6	6
4	(France) C Paquet	4	7	6
Q	(Philippines) A Eala	6	5	3
PR	(Liechtenstein) K von Deichmann	6	6
(Japan) Y Miyazaki	4	4

Quarterfinals
1	(Netherlands) A Rus	6^{3}	6^{2}
8	(Russia) A Blinkova	7^{7}	7^{7}
4	(France) C Paquet	5	4
PR	(Liechtenstein) K von Deichmann	7	6

Semifinals
8	(Russia) A Blinkova	6	6
PR	(Liechtenstein) K von Deichmann	1	2

=== Bottom half ===
First round
5	(Ukraine) D Snigur	6	6
Q	(France) M Rouvroy	2	4
(Germany) T Maria	6	6
(Belgium) Y Bonaventure	3	3
WC	(France) C Monnet	4	3
(Germany) S Wagner	6	6
WC	(France) A Robbe	3	2
3	(Belgium) G Minnen	6	6
6	(United Kingdom) K Boulter	6	7
(Switzerland) S Vögele	2	5
(Latvia) D Vismane	6	3
Q	(France) E Ramirez	3	0^{r}
Q	(United Kingdom) A Barnett	6	6
WC	(France) A Monnot	3	2
(Poland) U Radwańska	6	3	4
2	(Italy) M Trevisan	1	6	6

Second round
5	(Ukraine) D Snigur	0	3
(Germany) T Maria	6	6
(Germany) S Wagner	5	4
3	(Belgium) G Minnen	7	6
6	(United Kingdom) K Boulter	6	6
(Latvia) D Vismane	0	3
Q	(United Kingdom) A Barnett	6	1	5
2	(Italy) M Trevisan	2	6	7

Quarterfinals
(Germany) T Maria	7^{7}	6
3	(Belgium) G Minnen	6^{5}	3
6	(United Kingdom) K Boulter	4	6	6
2	(Italy) M Trevisan	6	2	1

Semifinals
(Germany) T Maria	2	4
6	(United Kingdom) K Boulter	6	6
