= 2022 Engie Open de l'Isère – Doubles =

Doubles
- 2022 Engie Open de l'Isère

Final
- Champions: (Japan) Yuriko Miyazaki (India) Prarthana Thombare
- Runners-up: (United Kingdom) Alicia Barnett (United Kingdom) Olivia Nicholls
- Score: 6–3, 6–3

Events
Singles	Doubles
← 2021 ·	Open de l'Isère	· 2023 →

Ioana Loredana Roșca and Kimberley Zimmermann were the defending champions but chose not to participate.

Yuriko Miyazaki and Prarthana Thombare won the title, defeating Alicia Barnett and Olivia Nicholls in the final, 6–3, 6–3.

== Seeds ==
1. (Belgium) Greet Minnen / (Netherlands) Arantxa Rus (semifinals)
2. (France) Estelle Cascino / (France) Jessika Ponchet (semifinals)
3. (United Kingdom) Alicia Barnett / (United Kingdom) Olivia Nicholls (final)
4. (Japan) Yuriko Miyazaki / (India) Prarthana Thombare (champions)

== Draw ==
=== Key ===
- Q = Qualifier
- WC = Wild card
- LL = Lucky loser
- Alt = Alternate
- SE = Special exempt
- PR = Protected ranking
- ITF = ITF entry
- JE = Junior exempt
- w/o = Walkover
- r = Retired
- d = Defaulted
- SR = Special ranking

=== Draw ===
First round
(France) F Brugnone (France) M Szostak	4	4
(France) A Droguet (France) M Rouvroy	6	6
(Latvia) D Vismane (Switzerland) J Züger	6	6
(France) C Monnet (France) V Muntean	2	4
(Latvia) K Bartone (Russia) E Makarova	6	2	[7]
(Belgium) Y Bonaventure (Germany) T Korpatsch	3	6	[10]

Quarterfinals
1	(Belgium) G Minnen (Netherlands) A Rus	6	6
(France) A Droguet (France) M Rouvroy	0	3
4	(Japan) Y Miyazaki (India) P Thombare	6	6
(Latvia) D Vismane (Switzerland) J Züger	3	4
(Belgium) Y Bonaventure (Germany) T Korpatsch	4	1
3	(United Kingdom) A Barnett (United Kingdom) O Nicholls	6	6
(France) A Monnot (France) A Robbe	4	3
2	(France) E Cascino (France) J Ponchet	6	6

Semifinals
1	(Belgium) G Minnen (Netherlands) A Rus	7^{7}	1	[8]
4	(Japan) Y Miyazaki (India) P Thombare	6^{3}	6	[10]
3	(United Kingdom) A Barnett (United Kingdom) O Nicholls	2	7	[12]
2	(France) E Cascino (France) J Ponchet	6	5	[10]

Final
4	(Japan) Y Miyazaki (India) P Thombare	6	6
3	(United Kingdom) A Barnett (United Kingdom) O Nicholls	3	3
