= 2025 French Open – Women's doubles =

Women's doubles
- 2025 French Open

Final
- Champions: (Italy) Sara Errani (Italy) Jasmine Paolini
- Runners-up: (Kazakhstan) Anna Danilina (Serbia) Aleksandra Krunić
- Score: 6–4, 2–6, 6–1

Events
| Singles | men | women | | boys | girls |
| Doubles | men | women | mixed | boys | girls |
| WC Singles | men | women | quad | boys | girls |
| WC Doubles | men | women | quad | boys | girls |
- French Open

Sara Errani and Jasmine Paolini defeated Anna Danilina and Aleksandra Krunić in the final, 6–4, 2–6, 6–1 to win the women's doubles tennis title at the 2025 French Open. It was Paolini's first major title in any discipline, and Errani's eighth.

Coco Gauff and Kateřina Siniaková were the reigning champions, but Gauff did not participate this year. Siniaková partnered with Taylor Townsend, but lost in the quarterfinals to Danilina and Krunić. Siniaková retained the world No. 1 doubles ranking after Erin Routliffe lost in the first round.

Elise Mertens was vying to complete the career Grand Slam. She partnered Veronika Kudermetova, but they lost in the quarterfinals to Errani and Paolini.

This marked the final French Open appearance of former doubles world No. 2 and two-time doubles champion Caroline Garcia. She partnered Diane Parry, but they lost in the third round to Mirra Andreeva and Diana Shnaider.

== Seeds ==
1. (Czech Republic) Kateřina Siniaková / (United States) Taylor Townsend (quarterfinals)
2. (Italy) Sara Errani / (Italy) Jasmine Paolini (champions)
3. (Chinese Taipei) Hsieh Su-wei / (Latvia) Jeļena Ostapenko (second round)
4. Mirra Andreeva / Diana Shnaider (semifinals)
5. (United States) Asia Muhammad / (Netherlands) Demi Schuurs (third round)
6. Veronika Kudermetova / (Belgium) Elise Mertens (quarterfinals)
7. (United States) Caroline Dolehide / (United States) Desirae Krawczyk (first round)
8. (United States) Sofia Kenin / (Ukraine) Lyudmyla Kichenok (first round)
9. (Chinese Taipei) Chan Hao-ching / (Mexico) Giuliana Olmos (second round)
10. (China) Jiang Xinyu / (Chinese Taipei) Wu Fang-hsien (second round)
11. Irina Khromacheva / (Hungary) Fanny Stollár (first round)
12. (Slovakia) Tereza Mihalíková / (United Kingdom) Olivia Nicholls (third round)
13. (Brazil) Beatriz Haddad Maia / (Germany) Laura Siegemund (third round)
14. (Hungary) Tímea Babos / (Brazil) Luisa Stefani (third round)
15. (United States) Nicole Melichar-Martinez / Liudmila Samsonova (second round)
16. (Japan) Miyu Kato / (Indonesia) Aldila Sutjiadi (first round)

Click on the seed number of a player to go to their draw section.

== Draw ==
Key

- Q = Qualifier
- WC = Wild card
- LL = Lucky loser
- Alt = Alternate
- ITF = ITF entry
- PR = Protected ranking
- SR = Special ranking
- SE = Special exempt
- JE = Junior exempt
- JR = Junior Accelerator Programme entrant
- CO = College Accelerator Programme entrant
- NG = Next Gen Accelerator Program entrant
- w/o = Walkover
- r = Retired
- d = Defaulted

=== Finals ===
Quarterfinals
1 | (Czech Republic) Kateřina Siniaková (United States) Taylor Townsend | 5 | 6 | 2
(Kazakhstan) Anna Danilina (Serbia) Aleksandra Krunić | 7 | 4 | 6
Alt | (Romania) Irina-Camelia Begu (Belgium) Yanina Wickmayer | 4 | 3
(Norway) Ulrikke Eikeri (Japan) Eri Hozumi | 6 | 6
(Serbia) Olga Danilović; Anastasia Potapova | 3 | 5
4 | Mirra Andreeva; Diana Shnaider | 6 | 7
6 | Veronika Kudermetova (Belgium) Elise Mertens | 2 | 3
2 | (Italy) Sara Errani (Italy) Jasmine Paolini | 6 | 6

Semifinals
(Kazakhstan) Anna Danilina (Serbia) Aleksandra Krunić | 6^{5} | 6 | 7
(Norway) Ulrikke Eikeri (Japan) Eri Hozumi | 7^{7} | 3 | 5
4 | Mirra Andreeva; Diana Shnaider | 0 | 1
2 | (Italy) Sara Errani (Italy) Jasmine Paolini | 6 | 6

Final
(Kazakhstan) Anna Danilina (Serbia) Aleksandra Krunić | 4 | 6 | 1
2 | (Italy) Sara Errani (Italy) Jasmine Paolini | 6 | 2 | 6

=== Top half ===
==== Section 1 ====
First round
1 | (Czech Republic) K Siniaková (United States) T Townsend | 6 | 7^{7}
(Australia) O Gadecki (China) S Zhang | 2 | 6^{2}
(China) H Guo (Japan) E Shibahara | 7^{7} | 5 | 3
PR | (United Kingdom) J Burrage (United Kingdom) S Kartal | 6^{5} | 7 | 6
WC | (France) É Dartron (France) T Rakotomanga Rajaonah | 7 | 1 | 2
Alt | (Czech Republic) A Dețiuc (Ukraine) Y Starodubtseva | 5 | 6 | 6
(Ukraine) A Kalinina (China) Y Xu | 0 | 1
14 | (Hungary) T Babos (Brazil) L Stefani | 6 | 6
10 | (China) X Jiang (Chinese Taipei) F-h Wu | 6 | 6
(Colombia) C Osorio (United States) A Parks | 4 | 1
(Kazakhstan) A Danilina (Serbia) A Krunić | 6^{3} | 6 | 6
(Poland) M Linette (United States) B Pera | 7^{7} | 1 | 4
WC | (France) E Cascino (France) C Monnet | 4 | 1
A Pavlyuchenkova; E Pridankina | 6 | 6
PR | (Australia) S Hunter (Australia) E Perez | 6 | 2 | 0
5 | (United States) A Muhammad (Netherlands) D Schuurs | 3 | 6 | 6

Second round
1 | (Czech Republic) K Siniaková (United States) T Townsend | 6 | 6
PR | (United Kingdom) J Burrage (United Kingdom) S Kartal | 2 | 2
Alt | (Czech Republic) A Dețiuc (Ukraine) Y Starodubtseva | 6 | 3 | 5
14 | (Hungary) T Babos (Brazil) L Stefani | 4 | 6 | 7
10 | (China) X Jiang (Chinese Taipei) F-h Wu | 4 | 3
(Kazakhstan) A Danilina (Serbia) A Krunić | 6 | 6
A Pavlyuchenkova; E Pridankina | 4 | 7^{9} | 3
5 | (United States) A Muhammad (Netherlands) D Schuurs | 6 | 6^{7} | 6

Third round
1 | (Czech Republic) K Siniaková (United States) T Townsend | 6^{6} | 6 | 6
14 | (Hungary) T Babos (Brazil) L Stefani | 7^{8} | 3 | 4
(Kazakhstan) A Danilina (Serbia) A Krunić | 6 | 6
5 | (United States) A Muhammad (Netherlands) D Schuurs | 4 | 0

Quarterfinals
1 | (Czech Republic) K Siniaková (United States) T Townsend | 5 | 6 | 2
(Kazakhstan) A Danilina (Serbia) A Krunić | 7 | 4 | 6

==== Section 2 ====
First round
3 | (Chinese Taipei) S-w Hsieh (Latvia) J Ostapenko | 6 | 3 | 7^{10}
Alt | (Hungary) A Bondár (Belgium) G Minnen | 3 | 6 | 6^{3}
K Rakhimova (Czech Republic) A Sisková | 6 | 6
(Ukraine) N Kichenok (Ukraine) D Yastremska | 4 | 4
(Australia) K Birrell (United Kingdom) H Dart | 6^{5} | 6 | 2
Alt | (Romania) I-C Begu (Belgium) Y Wickmayer | 7^{7} | 3 | 6
(Spain) J Bouzas Maneiro (France) V Gracheva | 4 | 6 | 0
15 | (United States) N Melichar-Martinez; L Samsonova | 6 | 3 | 6
11 | I Khromacheva (Hungary) F Stollár | 4 | 6 | 4
(China) Xin Wang (China) S Zheng | 6 | 4 | 6
(Norway) U Eikeri (Japan) E Hozumi | 6 | 6
(Germany) E Lys (Germany) T Maria | 0 | 2
(United States) Q Gleason (United States) K Volynets | 5 | 2
(Slovakia) R Šramková (Bulgaria) V Tomova | 7 | 6
(Australia) M Joint (Georgia (country)) O Kalashnikova | 7^{9} | 6
8 | (United States) S Kenin (Ukraine) L Kichenok | 6^{7} | 4

Second round
3 | (Chinese Taipei) S-w Hsieh (Latvia) J Ostapenko | 4 | 2
K Rakhimova (Czech Republic) A Sisková | 6 | 6
Alt | (Romania) I-C Begu (Belgium) Y Wickmayer | 6 | 5 | 7
15 | (United States) N Melichar-Martinez; L Samsonova | 3 | 7 | 5
(China) Xin Wang (China) S Zheng | 7^{8} | 1 | 3
(Norway) U Eikeri (Japan) E Hozumi | 6^{6} | 6 | 6
(Slovakia) R Šramková (Bulgaria) V Tomova | 6 | 6
(Australia) M Joint (Georgia (country)) O Kalashnikova | 2 | 3

Third round
K Rakhimova (Czech Republic) A Sisková | 6 | 4 | 3
Alt | (Romania) I-C Begu (Belgium) Y Wickmayer | 4 | 6 | 6
(Norway) U Eikeri (Japan) E Hozumi | 6 | 6
(Slovakia) R Šramková (Bulgaria) V Tomova | 3 | 2

Quarterfinals
Alt | (Romania) I-C Begu (Belgium) Y Wickmayer | 4 | 3
(Norway) U Eikeri (Japan) E Hozumi | 6 | 6

=== Bottom half ===
==== Section 3 ====
First round
7 | (United States) C Dolehide (United States) D Krawczyk | 6 | 4 | 5
(Serbia) O Danilović; A Potapova | 1 | 6 | 7
(Philippines) A Eala (Mexico) R Zarazúa | 7 | 6
Alt | (United Kingdom) E Appleton (Spain) Y Cavallé Reimers | 5 | 4
(Romania) M Niculescu (Poland) K Piter | 0 | 2
(Canada) L Fernandez (Kazakhstan) Y Putintseva | 6 | 6
(Czech Republic) L Nosková (Denmark) C Tauson | 3 | 6 | 6^{6}
12 | (Slovakia) T Mihalíková (United Kingdom) O Nicholls | 6 | 4 | 7^{10}
16 | (Japan) M Kato (Indonesia) A Sutjiadi | 4 | 2
WC | (France) C Garcia (France) D Parry | 6 | 6
(Japan) M Ninomiya (China) Q Tang | 6 | 6
WC | (France) E Lechemia (France) H Tan | 3 | 4
WC | (France) S Iliev (France) E Léné | 3 | 1
(United Kingdom) M Lumsden (United States) S Santamaria | 6 | 6
(United States) H Baptiste (United States) A Krueger | 3 | 0
4 | M Andreeva; D Shnaider | 6 | 6

Second round
(Serbia) O Danilović; A Potapova | 6 | 6
(Philippines) A Eala (Mexico) R Zarazúa | 1 | 3
(Canada) L Fernandez (Kazakhstan) Y Putintseva | 4 | 6 | 4
12 | (Slovakia) T Mihalíková (United Kingdom) O Nicholls | 6 | 0 | 6
WC | (France) C Garcia (France) D Parry | 3 | 6 | 6
(Japan) M Ninomiya (China) Q Tang | 6 | 4 | 2
(United Kingdom) M Lumsden (United States) S Santamaria | 0 | 0
4 | M Andreeva; D Shnaider | 6 | 6

Third round
(Serbia) O Danilović; A Potapova | 6^{4} | 7^{7} | 6
12 | (Slovakia) T Mihalíková (United Kingdom) O Nicholls | 7^{7} | 6^{3} | 0
WC | (France) C Garcia (France) D Parry | 0 | 5
4 | M Andreeva; D Shnaider | 6 | 7

Quarterfinals
(Serbia) O Danilović; A Potapova | 3 | 5
4 | M Andreeva; D Shnaider | 6 | 7

==== Section 4 ====
First round
6 | V Kudermetova (Belgium) E Mertens | 6 | 6
(Romania) J Cristian; A Panova | 0 | 0
(Spain) C Bucșa (Italy) A Moratelli | 3 | 3
E Alexandrova (United States) P Stearns | 6 | 6
(Italy) L Bronzetti (United States) A Li | 3 | 6 | 6
WC | (France) J Belgraver (France) L Boisson | 6 | 3 | 2
(United States) M Kessler (Netherlands) S Lamens | 3 | 7 | 6^{8}
9 | (Chinese Taipei) H-c Chan (Mexico) G Olmos | 6 | 5 | 7^{10}
13 | (Brazil) B Haddad Maia (Germany) L Siegemund | 6 | 6
WC | (France) L Jeanjean (France) J Ponchet | 3 | 0
(Japan) S Aoyama (Japan) M Uchijima | 7^{7} | 6
P Kudermetova (Turkey) Z Sönmez | 6^{5} | 3
A Blinkova (Egypt) M Sherif | 2 | 7 | 3
(New Zealand) L Sun (China) Y Yuan | 6 | 5 | 6
V Azarenka (New Zealand) E Routliffe | 2 | 3
2 | (Italy) S Errani (Italy) J Paolini | 6 | 6

Second round
6 | V Kudermetova (Belgium) E Mertens | 3 | 6 | 6
E Alexandrova (United States) P Stearns | 6 | 4 | 2
(Italy) L Bronzetti (United States) A Li | 6^{4} | 7 | 7^{10}
9 | (Chinese Taipei) H-c Chan (Mexico) G Olmos | 7^{7} | 5 | 6^{5}
13 | (Brazil) B Haddad Maia (Germany) L Siegemund | 6 | 6
(Japan) S Aoyama (Japan) M Uchijima | 2 | 4
(New Zealand) L Sun (China) Y Yuan | 5 | 2
2 | (Italy) S Errani (Italy) J Paolini | 7 | 6

Third round
6 | V Kudermetova (Belgium) E Mertens | 6 | 6
(Italy) L Bronzetti (United States) A Li | 2 | 3
13 | (Brazil) B Haddad Maia (Germany) L Siegemund | 4 | 3
2 | (Italy) S Errani (Italy) J Paolini | 6 | 6

Quarterfinals
6 | V Kudermetova (Belgium) E Mertens | 2 | 3
2 | (Italy) S Errani (Italy) J Paolini | 6 | 6

== Seeded teams ==
The following are the seeded teams. Seedings are based on WTA rankings as of 19 May 2025.

| Country | Player | Country | Player | Rank | Seed |
|---|---|---|---|---|---|
| CZE | Kateřina Siniaková | USA | Taylor Townsend | 3 | 1 |
| ITA | Sara Errani | ITA | Jasmine Paolini | 12 | 2 |
| TPE | Hsieh Su-wei | LAT | Jeļena Ostapenko | 17 | 3 |
| | Mirra Andreeva | | Diana Shnaider | 24 | 4 |
| USA | Asia Muhammad | NED | Demi Schuurs | 30 | 5 |
| | Veronika Kudermetova | BEL | Elise Mertens | 31 | 6 |
| USA | Caroline Dolehide | USA | Desirae Krawczyk | 41 | 7 |
| USA | Sofia Kenin | UKR | Lyudmyla Kichenok | 47 | 8 |
| TPE | Chan Hao-ching | MEX | Giuliana Olmos | 55 | 9 |
| CHN | Jiang Xinyu | TPE | Wu Fang-hsien | 59 | 10 |
| | Irina Khromacheva | HUN | Fanny Stollár | 66 | 11 |
| SVK | Tereza Mihalíková | GBR | Olivia Nicholls | 66 | 12 |
| BRA | Beatriz Haddad Maia | GER | Laura Siegemund | 71 | 13 |
| HUN | Tímea Babos | BRA | Luisa Stefani | 72 | 14 |
| USA | Nicole Melichar-Martinez | | Liudmila Samsonova | 73 | 15 |
| JPN | Miyu Kato | INA | Aldila Sutjiadi | 73 | 16 |

== Other entry information ==
=== Wildcards ===
- (France) Julie Belgraver / (France) Loïs Boisson
- (France) Estelle Cascino / (France) Carole Monnet
- (France) Émeline Dartron / (France) Tiantsoa Rakotomanga Rajaonah
- (France) Caroline Garcia / (France) Diane Parry
- (France) Sarah Iliev / (France) Emma Léné
- (France) Léolia Jeanjean / (France) Jessika Ponchet
- (France) Elixane Lechemia / (France) Harmony Tan

=== Protected ranking ===
- (United Kingdom) Jodie Burrage / (United Kingdom) Sonay Kartal
- (Australia) Storm Hunter / (Australia) Ellen Perez

=== Alternates ===
- (United Kingdom) Emily Appleton / (Spain) Yvonne Cavallé Reimers
- (Romania) Irina-Camelia Begu / (Belgium) Yanina Wickmayer
- (Hungary) Anna Bondár / (Belgium) Greet Minnen
- (Czech Republic) Anastasia Dețiuc / (Ukraine) Yuliia Starodubtseva

=== Withdrawals ===
- § (Armenia) Elina Avanesyan / (Italy) Elisabetta Cocciaretto → replaced by (Romania) Irina-Camelia Begu / (Belgium) Yanina Wickmayer
- § (Czech Republic) Marie Bouzková / (Czech Republic) Markéta Vondroušová → replaced by (Hungary) Anna Bondár / (Belgium) Greet Minnen
- § (Romania) Sorana Cîrstea / Anna Kalinskaya → replaced by (Czech Republic) Anastasia Dețiuc / (Ukraine) Yuliia Starodubtseva
- ‡ (Canada) Gabriela Dabrowski / (New Zealand) Erin Routliffe → replaced by Victoria Azarenka / (New Zealand) Erin Routliffe
- § (Ukraine) Marta Kostyuk / (Romania) Elena-Gabriela Ruse → replaced by (United Kingdom) Emily Appleton / (Spain) Yvonne Cavallé Reimers

‡ – withdrew from entry list
§ – withdrew from main draw
