= Tennis at the 2026 Central American and Caribbean Games =

- Venue: Centro Nacional de Tenis
- Location: Santo Domingo Este, Dominican Republic
- Dates: 24–31 July

The tennis competition at the 2026 Central American and Caribbean Games was held in Santo Domingo Este, Dominican Republic, from 24 to 31 July 2026 at the Centro Nacional de Tenis.

== Participating nations ==
A total of 18 nations qualified athletes. The number of athletes a nation entered is in parentheses beside the name of the country.

- Barbados (4)
- Bermuda (4)
- Colombia (6)
- Costa Rica (2)
- Cuba (5)
- Curaçao (2)
- Dominican Republic (8)
- El Salvador (5)
- Guadeloupe (3)
- Guatemala (8)
- Honduras (6)
- Jamaica (3)
- Mexico (8)
- Puerto Rico (6)
- Saint Kitts and Nevis (2)
- Trinidad and Tobago (1)
- Venezuela (6)
- Virgin Islands (1)

== Medal table ==
* Host nation (Dominican Republic)

Rank	Nation	Gold	Silver	Bronze	Total
1	Mexico (MEX)	2	1	1	4
2	Dominican Republic (DOM)*	2	0	1	3
3	Colombia (COL)	1	3	1	5
4	Guadeloupe (GLP)	1	0	1	2
5	El Salvador (ESA)	1	0	0	1
6	Barbados (BAR)	0	1	0	1
6	Guatemala (GUA)	0	1	0	1
6	Honduras (HON)	0	1	0	1
9	Venezuela (VEN)	0	0	2	2
10	Puerto Rico (PUR)	0	0	1	1
Totals (10 entries)		7	7	7	21

== Medal summary ==
Event	Gold	Silver	Bronze
Men's singles	Nick Hardt; Dominican Republic	Juan Sebastián Gómez; Colombia	Yannik Álvarez; Puerto Rico
Women's singles	Julia García Ruiz; Mexico	Ana Sofía Sánchez; Mexico	Ana Zamburek; Dominican Republic
Men's doubles	El Salvador; César Cruz; Diego Durán	Barbados; Kaipo Marshall; Stephen Slocombe	Colombia; Juan Sebastián Gómez; Cristian Rodríguez
Women's doubles	Guadeloupe; Émeline Dartron; Mathilde Lollia	Honduras; Natalie Espinal; Alejandra Obando	Mexico; Julia García Ruiz; Ana Sofía Sánchez
Mixed doubles	Colombia; María Paulina Pérez; Cristian Rodríguez	Guatemala; Deborah Domínguez; Juan Domínguez	Venezuela; Vanesa Suárez; Brandon Pérez
Men's nations cup	Dominican Republic; Alberto Puello; Enmanuel Muñoz; Nick Hardt; Peter Bertrán	Colombia; Juan Sebastián Gómez; Alejandro Arcila; Cristian Rodríguez	Venezuela; Brandon Pérez; Oscar Martínez; Rodolfo de Andreis
Women's nations cup	Mexico; Ingrid Millán; Ana Sofía Sánchez; Julia García Ruiz; Midori Castillo	Colombia; Yuliana Lizarazo; María Paulina Pérez; María Torres Murcia	Guadeloupe; Émeline Dartron; Mathilde Lollia; Audrey Moutama
