= 2026 L'Open 35 de Saint-Malo =

- Date: 27 April – 3 May
- Edition: 31st
- Category: WTA 125
- Draw: 32S/16D
- Prize money: €100,000
- Surface: Clay
- Location: Saint-Malo, France

Champions

Singles
- (Japan) Moyuka Uchijima

Doubles
- (Netherlands) Isabelle Haverlag / (United Kingdom) Maia Lumsden
- L'Open 35 de Saint-Malo

The 2026 L'Open 35 de Saint-Malo was a professional women's tennis tournament played on outdoor clay courts. It was the thirty-first edition of the tournament and a part of the 2026 WTA 125 Circuit. It took place at the Tennis Club JA Saint-Malo in Saint-Malo, France between 27 April and 3 May 2026.

== Singles entrants ==
=== Seeds ===
Country	Player	Rank^{1}	Seed
CZE	Tereza Valentová	51	1
AUS	Talia Gibson	58	2
FRA	Elsa Jacquemot	62	3
SUI	Viktorija Golubic	81	4
	Anna Blinkova	89	5
AUT	Lilli Tagger	91	6
JPN	Moyuka Uchijima	94	7
FRA	Diane Parry	95	8

- ^{1} Rankings are as of 20 April 2026.

=== Other entrants ===
The following players received wildcards into the singles main draw:

- (France) Clara Burel
- (France) Ksenia Efremova
- (France) Chloé Paquet
- (France) Diane Parry

The following players received entry using a protected ranking:

- (United States) Sloane Stephens
- (France) Alice Tubello

The following players received entry from the qualifying draw:

- (Turkey) Ayla Aksu
- (France) Julie Belgraver
- (France) Amandine Monnot
- (France) Lucie Nguyen Tan

The following players received entry as lucky losers:

- (France) Yara Bartashevich
- (Morocco) Yasmine Kabbaj

=== Withdrawals ===
- (United States) Hailey Baptiste → replaced by (United States) Whitney Osuigwe
- (Czech Republic) Sára Bejlek → replaced by (Belgium) Sofia Costoulas
- (Hungary) Anna Bondár → replaced by (Morocco) Yasmine Kabbaj
- (Australia) Maya Joint → replaced by (France) Jessika Ponchet
- (Slovenia) Kaja Juvan → replaced by (Canada) Bianca Andreescu
- (Ukraine) Anhelina Kalinina → replaced by (France) Fiona Ferro
- (Netherlands) Suzan Lamens → replaced by (France) Yara Bartashevich
- (United States) Caty McNally → replaced by (France) Alice Tubello
- (United States) Alycia Parks → replaced by (Switzerland) Céline Naef
- (Kazakhstan) Yulia Putintseva → replaced by (France) Alice Ramé

=== Retirement ===
- (France) Fiona Ferro

== Doubles entrants ==
=== Seeds ===
Country	Player	Country	Player	Rank^{1}	Seed
KAZ	Anna Danilina	USA	Asia Muhammad	30	1
JPN	Eri Hozumi	TPE	Wu Fang-hsien	83	2
TPE	Chan Hao-ching	USA	Ivana Corley	129	3
NED	Isabelle Haverlag	GBR	Maia Lumsden	138	4

- ^{1} Rankings as of 20 April 2026.

=== Other entrants ===
The following team received a wildcard into the doubles main draw:

- (France) Eleejah Inisan / (France) Astrid Lew Yan Foon

The following team received entry into the doubles main draw as an alternate:

- (Brazil) Carolina Alves / (United States) Whitney Osuigwe

=== Withdrawals ===
Before the tournament

- (France) Elsa Jacquemot / (France) Tiantsoa Rakotomanga Rajaonah → replaced by (Brazil) Carolina Alves / (United States) Whitney Osuigwe

During the tournament

- (New Zealand) Lulu Sun / (China) Zhang Shuai (Sun - foot injury)

== Champions ==
=== Singles ===
- (Japan) Moyuka Uchijima def. (Czech Republic) Tereza Valentová, 6–7^{(2–7)}, 6–3, 6–1

=== Doubles ===
- (Netherlands) Isabelle Haverlag / (United Kingdom) Maia Lumsden def. (Chinese Taipei) Chan Hao-ching / (United States) Ivana Corley, 6–4, 6–0
