= Open de l'Isère =

- 2026 Engie Open de l'Isère

ITF Women's Tour
- Event name: Engie Open de l'Isère
- Location: Grenoble, France
- Venue: Grenoble Tennis
- Category: ITF Women's World Tennis Tour
- Surface: Hard / Indoor
- Draw: 32S/32Q/16D
- Prize money: $60,000

The Open de l'Isère is a tournament for professional female tennis players played on indoor hardcourts. The event is classified as a $60,000 ITF Women's World Tennis Tour tournament and has been held in Grenoble, France, since 2011.

== Past finals ==
=== Singles ===
Year	Champion	Runner-up	Score
2026	(Switzerland) Céline Naef	(Belgium) Jeline Vandromme	7–5, 6–3
2025	Not held		
2024	Aliona Falei	(France) Manon Léonard	6–1, 4–6, 6–4
2023	(France) Océane Dodin	(Switzerland) Simona Waltert	6–2, 7–5
2022	(United Kingdom) Katie Boulter	(Russia) Anna Blinkova	7–6^{(7–2)}, 6–7^{(6–8)}, 6–2
2021	(Switzerland) Viktorija Golubic	(Belgium) Maryna Zanevska	6–1, 4–6, 7–6^{(7–2)}
2020	(France) Clara Burel	(Luxembourg) Eléonora Molinaro	5–7, 7–5, 6–2
2019	(Russia) Vitalia Diatchenko	(France) Harmony Tan	6–1, 6–4
2018	(France) Fiona Ferro	(Luxembourg) Eléonora Molinaro	6–4, 6–7^{(5–7)}, 7–6^{(7–3)}
2017	(Czech Republic) Markéta Vondroušová	(Russia) Anna Blinkova	7–5, 6–4
2016	(France) Myrtille Georges	(Netherlands) Indy de Vroome	7–6^{(7–4)}, 6–2
2015	(Poland) Magda Linette	(Czech Republic) Tereza Martincová	7–6^{(7–2)}, 4–6, 6–1
2014	(France) Pauline Parmentier	(Ukraine) Anastasiya Vasylyeva	2–6, 6–0, 6–4
2013	(Czech Republic) Sandra Záhlavová	(Ukraine) Maryna Zanevska	6–4, 5–7, 6–2
2012	(Czech Republic) Karolína Plíšková	(Czech Republic) Kristýna Plíšková	7–6^{(13–11)}, 7–6^{(8–6)}
2011	(Poland) Marta Domachowska	(United Kingdom) Naomi Broady	6–4, 6–4

=== Doubles ===
Year	Champions	Runners-up	Score
2026	(France) Tiphanie Lemaître (Ukraine) Veronika Podrez	(Netherlands) Demi Tran (Netherlands) Lian Tran	6–3, 6–2
2025	Not held		
2024	(United Kingdom) Emily Appleton (United Kingdom) Freya Christie	(United Kingdom) Sarah Beth Grey (United Kingdom) Eden Silva	3–6, 6–1, [11–9]
2023	(United Kingdom) Freya Christie (United Kingdom) Ali Collins	Sofya Lansere; Maria Timofeeva	6–4, 6–3
2022	(Japan) Yuriko Miyazaki (India) Prarthana Thombare	(United Kingdom) Alicia Barnett (United Kingdom) Olivia Nicholls	6–3, 6–3
2021	(Romania) Ioana Loredana Roșca (Belgium) Kimberley Zimmermann	(Netherlands) Arianne Hartono (Japan) Yuriko Miyazaki	6–1, 7–5
2020	(France) Amandine Hesse (France) Elixane Lechemia	(United Kingdom) Samantha Murray Sharan (Germany) Julia Wachaczyk	6–3, 4–6, [13–11]
2019	(France) Estelle Cascino (France) Elixane Lechemia	(Romania) Andreea Mitu (Romania) Elena-Gabriela Ruse	6–2, 6–2
2018	(Switzerland) Amra Sadiković (Netherlands) Eva Wacanno	(France) Estelle Cascino (France) Elixane Lechemia	4–6, 6–1, [10–6]
2017	(Belarus) Ilona Kremen (Czech Republic) Tereza Smitková	(Romania) Alexandra Cadanțu (Sweden) Cornelia Lister	6–1, 7–5
2016	(France) Manon Arcangioli (France) Alizé Lim	(Belarus) Lidziya Marozava (Switzerland) Amra Sadiković	7–5, 6–2
2015	(Japan) Hiroko Kuwata (Netherlands) Demi Schuurs	(France) Manon Arcangioli (Netherlands) Cindy Burger	6–1, 6–3
2014	(Georgia (country)) Sofia Shapatava (Ukraine) Anastasiya Vasylyeva	(Russia) Margarita Gasparyan (Ukraine) Kateryna Kozlova	6–1, 6–4
2013	(Russia) Maria Kondratieva (Czech Republic) Renata Voráčová	(Italy) Nicole Clerico (Spain) Leticia Costas	6–1, 6–4
2012	(Czech Republic) Karolína Plíšková (Czech Republic) Kristýna Plíšková	(Ukraine) Valentyna Ivakhnenko (Ukraine) Maryna Zanevska	6–1, 6–3
2011	(France) Stéphanie Cohen-Aloro (Tunisia) Selima Sfar	(Belarus) Iryna Brémond (France) Aurélie Védy	6–1, 6–3
