= Anastasia Kovaleva =

Russian tennis player (born 2002)

- Full name: Anastasia Olegovna Kovaleva
- Country (sports): Russia
- Born: 9 July 2002 (age 24) Moscow, Russia
- Plays: Right-handed
- Prize money: $39,080

Singles
- Career record: 97–96
- Career titles: 0
- Highest ranking: No. 421 (26 February 2024)

Doubles
- Career record: 49–59
- Career titles: 1 ITF
- Highest ranking: No. 338 (5 August 2024)

Anastasia Olegovna Kovaleva (Russian: Анастасия Олеговна Ковалева, born 9 July 2002) is a Russian former tennis player. She has a career-high singles ranking of No. 421 by the WTA, achieved on 26 February 2024, and a best doubles ranking of No. 338, achieved on 5 August 2024.

== Career ==
In 2022, she played her first singles final in Kazan, Russia. She lost to compatriot Polina Kudermetova. In 2023, she played the singles final in Jakarta, Indonesia. Kovaleva won her first W40 doubles tournament in Funchal, Portugal.

== ITF Circuit finals ==
=== Singles: 3 (3 runner-ups) ===
Legend W25 tournaments W15 tournaments	Finals by surface Hard (0–3)

Result	W–L	Date	Tournament	Tier	Surface	Opponent	Score
Loss	0–1	Jan 2022	ITF Kazan, Russia	W15	Hard (i)	(Russia) Polina Kudermetova	0–6, 4–6
Loss	0–2	Mar 2023	ITF Jakarta, Indonesia	W15	Hard	(South Korea) Park So-hyun	3–6, 3–6
Loss	0–3	Aug 2023	ITF Nakhon Si Thammarat, Thailand	W25	Hard	(Russia) Anastasia Zakharova	3–6, 3–6

=== Doubles: 2 (1 title, 1 runner-up) ===
Legend
W40 tournaments
W15 tournaments

Result	W–L	Date	Tournament	Tier	Surface	Partner	Opponents	Score
Loss	0–1	May 2023	ITF Antalya, Turkey	W15	Clay	(Russia) Anastasiia Sergienko	(Germany) Natalia Siedliska (Turkey) Doğa Türkmen	2–6, 2–6
Win	1–1	Nov 2023	ITF Funchal, Portugal	W40	Hard	(Russia) Elena Pridankina	(France) Yasmine Mansouri (Portugal) Inês Murta	6–2, 6–3
