= Sarah Iliev =

French tennis player (born 2006)

- Country (sports): France
- Born: 3 October 2006 (age 20)
- Plays: Right (two-handed backhand)
- Prize money: $78,361

Singles
- Career record: 103–86
- Highest ranking: No. 550 (6 November 2023)
- Current ranking: No. 755 (13 July 2026)

Grand Slam singles results
- French Open: Q1 (2024)

Doubles
- Career record: 27–30
- Career titles: 3 ITF
- Highest ranking: No. 425 (16 June 2025)
- Current ranking: No. 876 (13 July 2026)

Grand Slam doubles results
- French Open: 1R (2025)
- Last updated on: 16 July 2026.

Sarah Iliev (born 3 October 2006) is a French tennis player.

Iliev has a career-high singles ranking by the WTA of 550, achieved on 6 November 2023, and a best doubles ranking of world No. 425, achieved on 16 June 2025.

== Career ==
Iliev made her WTA Tour main-draw debut at the 2023 Internationaux de Strasbourg, after qualifying into the singles tournament with wins over Ellen Perez and Bai Zhuoxuan, before losing in the first round to Lauren Davis.

== ITF Circuit finals ==
=== Singles: 4 (1 titles, 3 runner-ups) ===
Legend W35 tournaments (0–1) W15 tournaments (1–2)	Finals by surface Hard (0–2) Clay (1–1)

Result	W–L	Date	Tournament	Tier	Surface	Opponent	Score
Loss	0–1	Nov 2022	ITF Monastir, Tunisia	W15	Hard	(Egypt) Merna Refaat	3–6, 1–6
Loss	0–2	Jan 2023	ITF Fort-de-France, Martinique	W15	Hard	(France) Emma Léné	2–6, 4–6
Loss	0–3	Apr 2025	ITF Santa Margherita di Pula, Italy	W35	Clay	(Finland) Laura Hietaranta	1–6, 1–6
Win	1–3	Sep 2026	ITF Dijon, France	W15	Clay	(France) Daphnée Mpetshi Perricard	2–6, 6–2, 6–3

=== Doubles: 5 (3 titles, 2 runner-up) ===
Legend W50 tournaments (1–0) W35 tournaments (0–1) W15 tournaments (2–1)	Finals by surface Hard (1–0) Clay (2–2)

Result	W–L	Date	Tournament	Tier	Surface	Partner	Opponents	Score
Loss	0–1	Aug 2024	ITF Braunschweig, Germany	W35	Clay	(Japan) Ikumi Yamazaki	(Japan) Funa Kozaki (Japan) Erika Sema	3–6, 6–7^{(9)}
Win	1–1	Sep 2024	ITF Saint-Palais-sur-Mer, France	W50	Clay	(France) Emma Léné	(Lithuania) Justina Mikulskytė (Greece) Sapfo Sakellaridi	7–6^{(5)}, 6–2
Win	2–1	Mar 2025	ITF Hagetmau, France	W15	Hard (i)	(France) Emma Léné	(United States) Ayana Akli (United States) Mia Horvit	7–6^{(2)}, 3–6, [10–8]
Win	3–1	Jun 2026	ITF Casablanca, Morocco	W15	Clay	(France) Emma Léné	(Morocco) Aya El Aouni (Morocco) Diae El Jardi	6–4, 6–2
Loss	3–2	Sep 2026	ITF Dijon, France	W15	Clay	(France) Sophia Biolay	(France) Marie Mattel (Netherlands) Demi Tran	2–6, 2–6
