= Emma Léné =

French tennis player (born 1999)

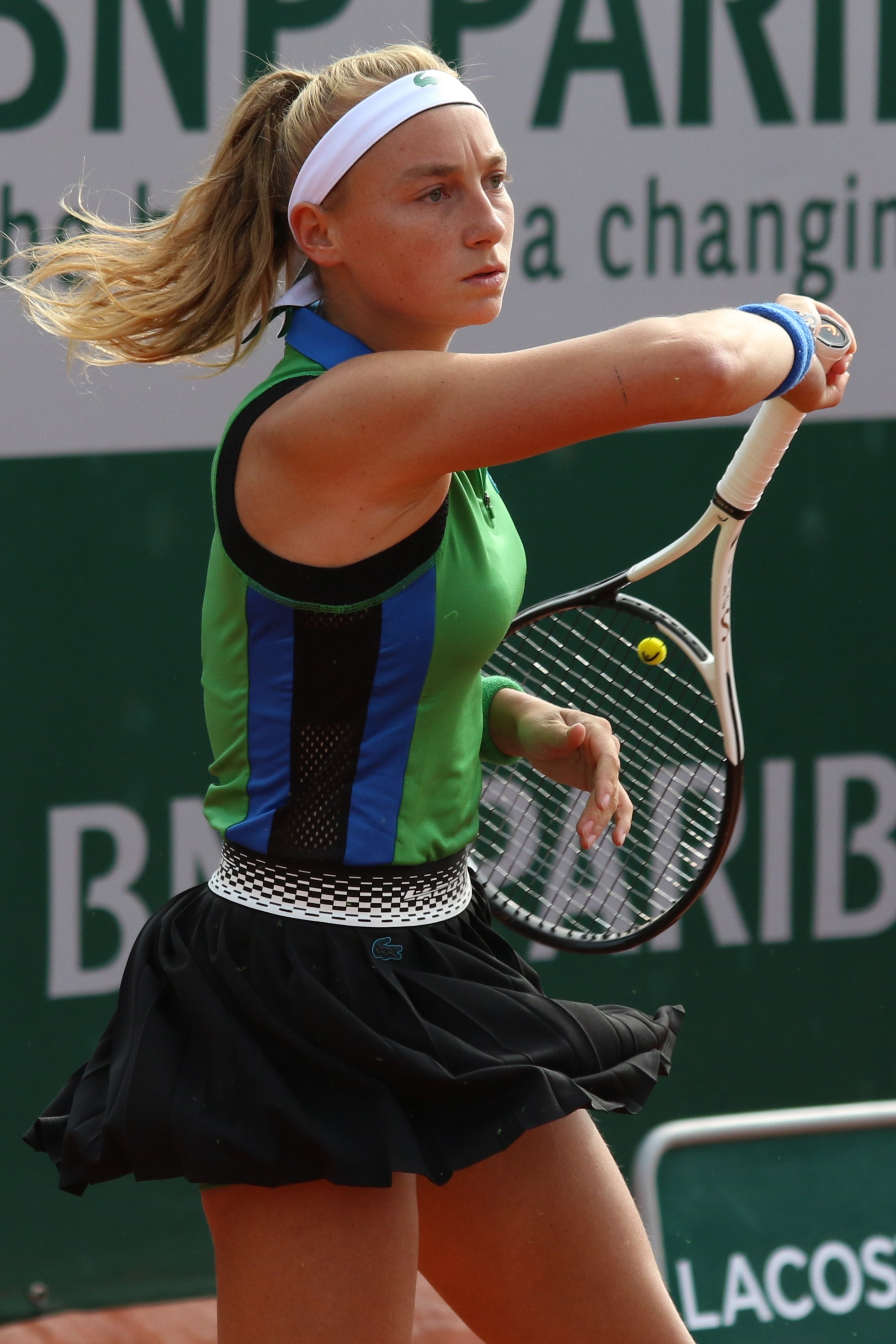
- Léné 2023 French Open
- Country (sports): France
- Born: 15 July 1999 (age 27)
- Plays: Right (two-handed backhand)
- Prize money: $105,861

Singles
- Career record: 219–182
- Career titles: 2 ITF
- Highest ranking: No. 351 (14 October 2024)
- Current ranking: No. 610 (13 July 2026)

Grand Slam singles results
- French Open: Q1 (2023)

Doubles
- Career record: 79–76
- Career titles: 7 ITF
- Highest ranking: No. 329 (21 October 2024)
- Current ranking: No. 1048 (13 July 2026)

Grand Slam doubles results
- French Open: 1R (2025)
- Last updated on: 16 July 2026.

Emma Léné (born 15 July 1999) is a French female tennis player.

Léné has a career-high singles ranking by the WTA of 351, achieved on 14 October 2024, and a best doubles ranking of world No. 329, achieved on 21 October 2024.

Léné won her first bigger title at the W50 event in Saint-Palais-sur-Mer in the doubles draw, partnering Sarah Iliev.

== ITF Circuit finals ==
=== Singles: 7 (3 titles, 4 runner-ups) ===
Legend W25/35 tournaments W15 tournaments	Finals by surface Hard (2–1) Clay (1–3)

Result	W–L	Date	Tournament	Tier	Surface	Opponent	Score
Loss	0–1	Oct 2022	ITF Eldorado, Argentina	W15	Clay	(Argentina) Luciana Moyano	6–1, 4–6, 4–6
Loss	0–2	Nov 2022	ITF Antalya, Turkey	W15	Clay	Ksenia Laskutova	6–4, 1–6, 1–6
Win	1–2	Jan 2023	ITF Fort-de-France, Martinique	W15	Hard	(France) Sarah Iliev	6–2, 6–4
Loss	1–3	Jan 2023	ITF Petit-Bourg, Guadeloupe	W25	Hard	(France) Margaux Rouvroy	2–6, 6–1, 1–6
Win	2–3	Jun 2024	ITF Périgueux, France	W35	Clay	(France) Alice Tubello	3–6, 6–4, 6–4
Loss	2–4	Apr 2025	ITF Santa Margherita di Pula, Italy	W35	Clay	(Ukraine) Anastasiia Sobolieva	0–6, 6–3, 2–6
Win	3–4	Oct 2026	ITF Villeneuve-d'Ascq, France	W35	Hard (i)	(France) Amandine Monnot	6–3, 5–7, 6–3

=== Doubles: 10 (7 titles, 3 runner-ups) ===
Legend W50 tournaments W25/35 tournaments W10/15 tournaments	Finals by surface Hard (2–1) Clay (5–2)

Result	W–L	Date	Tournament	Tier	Surface	Partner	Opponents	Score
Win	1–0	May 2016	ITF Antalya, Turkey	W10	Hard	(France) Lou Brouleau	(Slovenia) Nastja Kolar (United Kingdom) Francesca Stephenson	7–5, 6–3
Loss	1–1	Mar 2017	ITF Hammamet, Tunisia	W15	Clay	(France) Valentine Bacher	(Uzbekistan) Arina Folts (Slovenia) Nina Potočnik	4–6, 3–6
Win	2–1	Oct 2022	ITF Eldorado, Argentina	W15	Clay	(Brazil) Júlia Konishi Camargo Silva	(Argentina) Luciana Blatter (Argentina) Tiziana Rossini	6–2, 6–0
Win	3–1	Jul 2023	ITF Punta Cana, Dominican Republic	W25	Clay	(Germany) Emily Seibold	(United States) Carolyn Ansari (United States) Adeline Flach	6–1, 6–2
Loss	3–2	Jan 2024	ITF Le Gosier, Guadeloupe	W35	Hard	(France) Émeline Dartron	(United States) Jaeda Daniel (United States) Haley Giavara	2–6, 6–7^{(0)}
Loss	3–3	Feb 2024	ITF Hammamet, Tunisia	W35	Clay	(France) Astrid Lew Yan Foon	(Romania) Oana Gavrilă (Greece) Sapfo Sakellaridi	1–6, 3–6
Win	4–3	Apr 2024	ITF Hammamet, Tunisia	W35	Clay	(France) Yasmine Mansouri	(Italy) Gloria Ceschi (Italy) Giorgia Pinto	7–6^{(6)}, 7–6^{(2)}
Win	5–3	Sep 2024	ITF Saint-Palais-sur-Mer, France	W50	Clay	(France) Sarah Iliev	(Lithuania) Justina Mikulskytė (Greece) Sapfo Sakellaridi	7–6^{(5)}, 6–2
Win	6–3	Mar 2025	ITF Hagetmau, France	W15	Hard (i)	(France) Sarah Iliev	(United States) Ayana Akli (United States) Mia Horvit	7–6^{(2)}, 3–6, [10–8]
Win	7–3	Jun 2026	ITF Casablanca, Morocco	W15	Clay	(France) Sarah Iliev	(Morocco) Aya El Aouni (Morocco) Diae El Jardi	6–4, 6–2
