= Émeline Dartron =

French tennis player (born 2002)

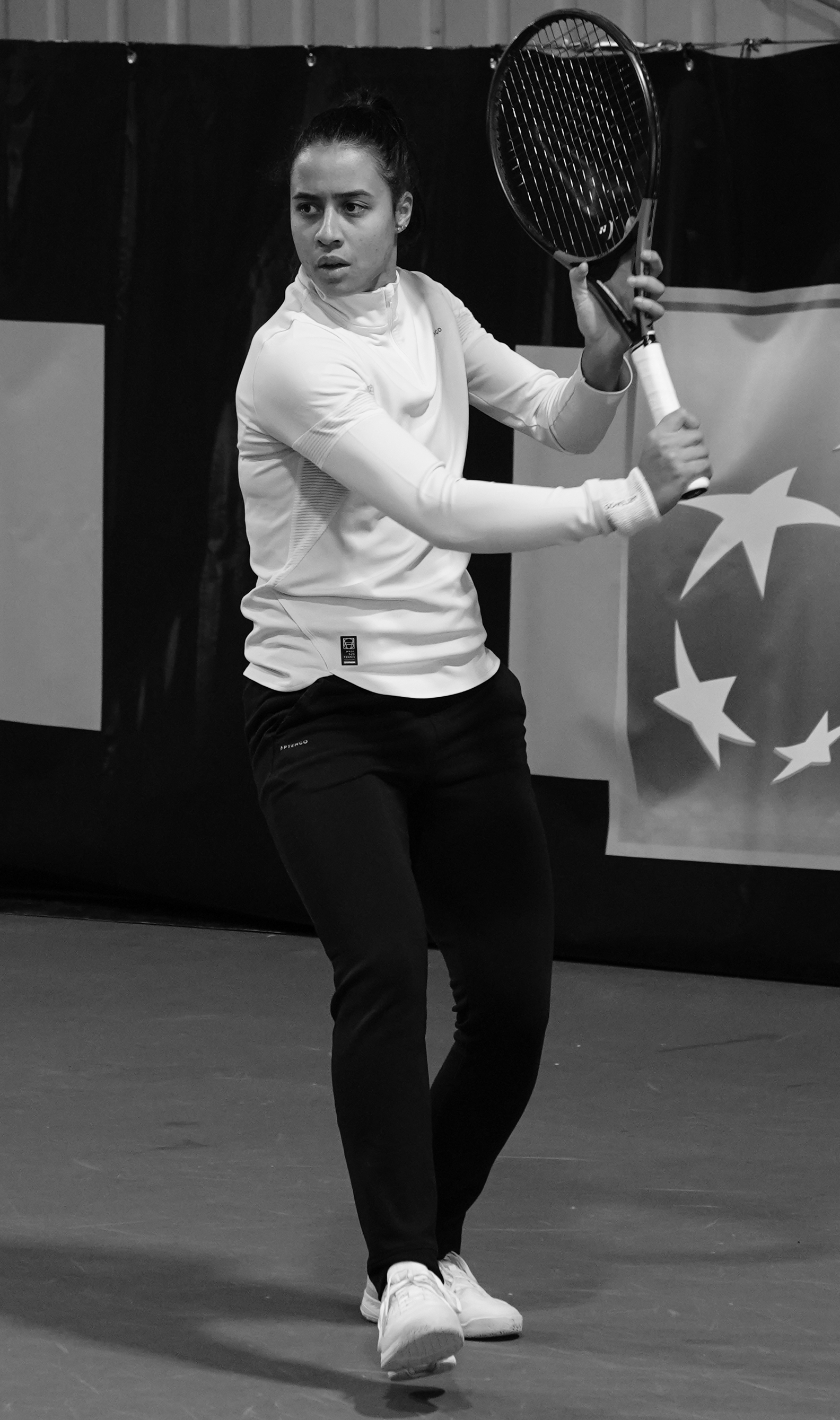
- Émeline Dartron, 2025
- Country (sports): France
- Born: 12 April 2000 (age 26)
- Plays: Right (two-handed backhand)
- Prize money: $149,499

Singles
- Career record: 194–164
- Career titles: 1 ITF
- Highest ranking: No. 300 (5 May 2025)

Grand Slam singles results
- French Open: Q1 (2022, 2023)

Doubles
- Career record: 75–61
- Career titles: 5 ITF
- Highest ranking: No. 275 (6 January 2025)
- Current ranking: No. 1,389 (21 September 2026)

Grand Slam doubles results
- French Open: 1R (2024, 2025)
Medal record
Representing Guadeloupe
Central American and Caribbean Games
Gold medal – first place	2026 Santo Domingo	Doubles
Bronze medal – third place	2026 Santo Domingo	Nations Cup
- Last updated on: 25 September 2026.

Émeline Dartron (born 12 April 2000) is a French inactive tennis player. She has a career-high singles ranking by the WTA of world No. 322, achieved on 31 March 2025. She also has a career-high WTA doubles ranking of No. 275, reached on 6 January 2025.

Dartron represented Guadeloupe at the 2026 Central American and Caribbean Games, winning the doubles gold and nations cup bronze medals.

== Career ==
Dartron won her first W75 title at the ITF event in Saint-Gaudens in the doubles draw, partnering Tiantsoa Rakotomanga Rajaonah.

== ITF Circuit finals ==
=== Singles: 8 (1 title, 7 runner-ups) ===
Legend W50 tournaments W25/35 tournaments W15 tournaments	Finals by surface Hard (1–2) Clay (0–5)

Result	W–L	Date	Tournament	Tier	Surface	Opponent	Score
Loss	0–1	Mar 2019	ITF Le Havre, France	W15	Clay (i)	(United Kingdom) Amanda Carreras	6–4, 3–6, 1–6
Loss	0–2	Apr 2019	ITF Tabarka, Tunisia	W15	Clay	(France) Alice Ramé	4–6, 2–6
Loss	0–3	Oct 2021	ITF Cherbourg, France	W25	Hard (i)	(France) Clara Burel	4–6, 2–6
Loss	0–4	Nov 2022	ITF Saint-Étienne, France	W25	Hard (i)	(France) Audrey Albié	4–6, 0–3 ret.
Loss	0–5	Dec 2023	ITF Nairobi, Kenya	W25	Clay	(Ukraine) Valeriya Strakhova	4–6, 7–5, 1–6
Loss	0–6	Mar 2024	ITF Gonesse, France	W15	Clay	(France) Tiantsoa Rakotomanga Rajaonah	4–6, 3–6
Win	1–6	Nov 2024	ITF Villeneuve-d'Ascq, France	W35	Hard (i)	(France) Tiantsoa Rakotomanga Rajaonah	6–2, 5–7, 6–3
Loss	1–7	Mar 2025	ITF Bujumbura, Burundi	W50	Clay	(Burundi) Sada Nahimana	1–6, 1–6

=== Doubles: 13 (5 titles, 8 runner-ups) ===
Legend W75 tournaments W50 tournaments W35 tournaments W15 tournaments	Finals by surface Hard (1–2) Clay (4–6)

Result	W–L	Date	Tournament	Tier	Surface	Partner	Opponents	Score
Win	1–0	Jul 2018	ITF Dijon, France	W15	Hard	(France) Mylène Halemai	(Romania) Karola Patricia Bejenaru (Germany) Yana Morderger	3–6, 7–6^{(1)}, [10–5]
Win	2–0	Mar 2019	ITF Amiens, France	W15	Clay (i)	(France) Maelys Bougrat	(Italy) Angelica Moratelli (United Kingdom) Anna Popescu	6–3, 6–2
Loss	2–1	Apr 2019	ITF Tabarka, Tunisia	W15	Clay	(France) Marie Témin	(Bosnia and Herzegovina) Nefisa Berberović (Slovenia) Veronika Erjavec	6–4, 3–6, [7–10]
Win	3–1	Jul 2021	ITF Knokke, Belgium	W15	Clay	(France) Margaux Rouvroy	(France) Anaëlle Leclercq (France) Lucie Nguyen Tan	6–1, 6–3
Loss	3–2	Apr 2022	ITF Cairo, Egypt	W15	Clay	(France) Lucie Nguyen Tan	(Italy) Diletta Cherubini; Mariia Tkacheva	6–3, 3–6, [8–10]
Loss	3–3	Nov 2022	ITF Monastir, Tunisia	W15	Hard	(France) Emmanuelle Girard	(Switzerland) Naïma Karamoko (Serbia) Bojana Marinković	4–6, 4–6
Loss	3–4	Jan 2024	ITF Le Gosier, Guadeloupe	W35	Hard	(France) Emma Léné	(United States) Jaeda Daniel (United States) Haley Giavara	2–6, 6–7^{(0)}
Win	4–4	Mar 2024	ITF Gonesse, France	W15	Clay	(France) Astrid Lew Yan Foon	(Belgium) Tilwith Di Girolami (France) Laïa Petretic	3–6, 6–0, [13–11]
Loss	4–5	Apr 2024	ITF Hammamet, Tunisia	W35	Clay	(France) Margaux Rouvroy	(Canada) Carson Branstine; Ekaterina Reyngold	3–6, 0–6
Win	5–5	May 2024	Open Saint-Gaudens, France	W75+H	Clay	(France) Tiantsoa Rakotomanga Rajaonah	(France) Estelle Cascino (France) Carole Monnet	6–3, 1–6, [12–10]
Loss	5–6	Jun 2024	ITF Périgueux, France	W35	Clay	(France) Jenny Lim	(Croatia) Mariana Dražić; Alevtina Ibragimova	5–7, 6–2, [5–10]
Loss	5–7	Apr 2025	ITF Bujumbura, Burundi	W50	Clay	(France) Tiantsoa Rakotomanga Rajaonah	(United States) Julia Adams; Anna Ureke	1–6, 2–6
Loss	5–8	May 2025	Open Saint-Gaudens, France	W75	Clay	(France) Tiantsoa Rakotomanga Rajaonah	(Czech Republic) Gabriela Knutson (Czech Republic) Anna Sisková	2–6, 2–6
