= Manon Léonard =

French tennis player (born 2001)

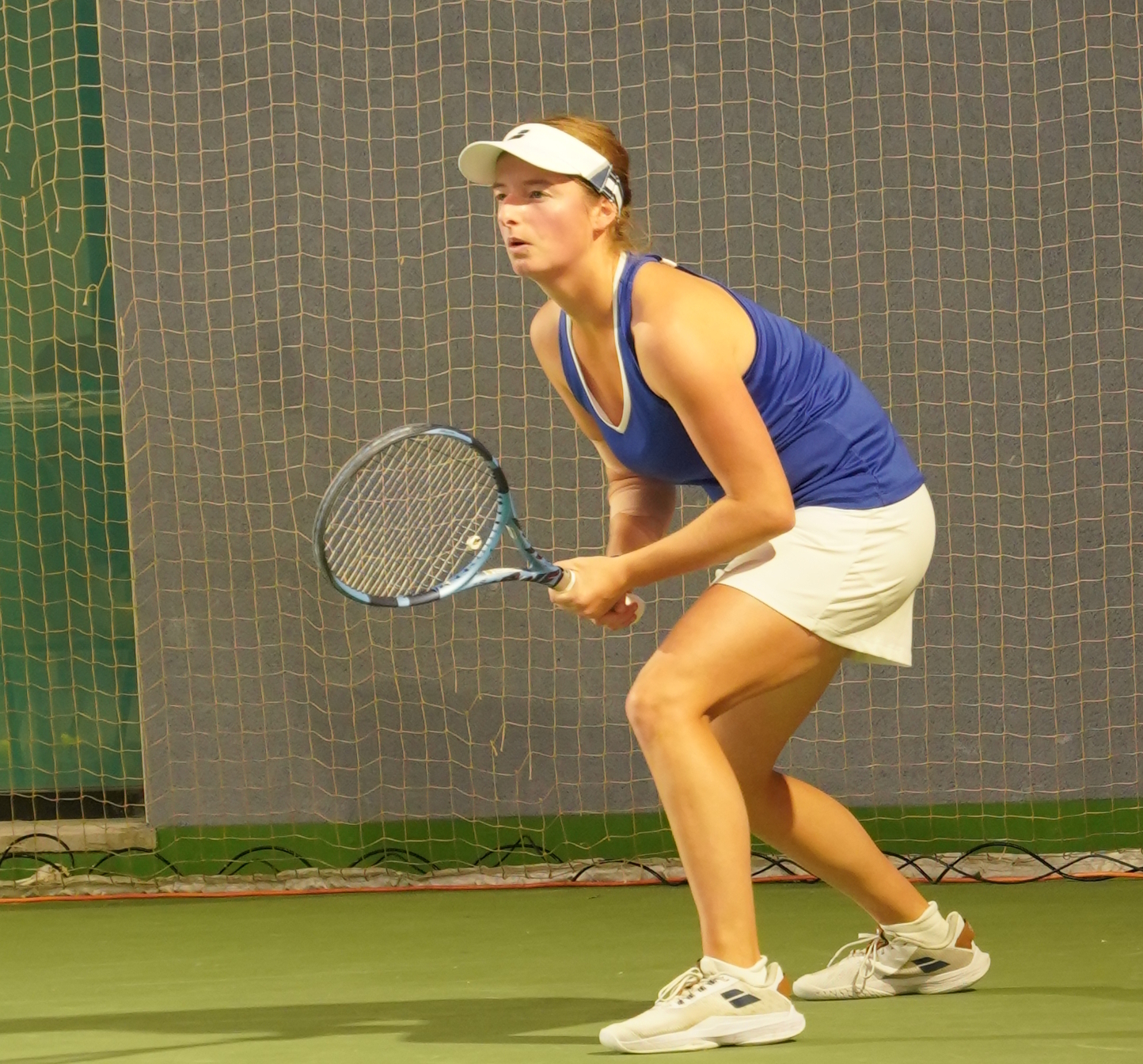
- Léonard at the Internationaux de Reims Champagne in 2025
- Country (sports): France
- Born: 20 January 2001 (age 25) Melun, Seine-et-Marne, France
- Plays: Right (two-handed backhand)
- Prize money: $374,266

Singles
- Career record: 216–176
- Career titles: 7 ITF
- Highest ranking: No. 176 (3 February 2025)
- Current ranking: No. 331 (10 August 2026)

Grand Slam singles results
- Australian Open: Q1 (2025, 2026)
- French Open: Q1 (2019, 2024, 2025, 2026)
- Wimbledon: Q1 (2025)
- US Open: Q2 (2025)

Doubles
- Career record: 49–65
- Career titles: 1 ITF
- Highest ranking: No. 448 (17 June 2024)
- Current ranking: No. 913 (10 August 2026)
- Last updated on: 22 August 2026.

Manon Léonard (born 20 January 2001) is a French professional tennis player. She has career-high rankings of 176 in singles, achieved on 3 February 2025, and 448 in doubles, reached on 17 June 2024.

== Early life ==
Léonard was born in Melun. Her father worked as a line judge, while her brother also plays tennis. She began her career playing at Le Mée Sports Tennis in Le Mée-sur-Seine and later moved to Tennis Club Fontainebleau in Fontainebleau. She completed a portion of her schooling through the National Centre for Distance Education.

== Career ==
=== Juniors ===
In May 2016, she received a wildcard into the girls' singles main draw of the French Open, but lost in the first round to Melany Krywoj. In January 2019, she reached the quarterfinals of the Traralgon Tennis International, but lost to Clara Tauson.

=== Professional ===
In February 2024, she reached the final of the Open de l'Isère. In February 2025, she won the Open Andrézieux-Bouthéon 42, defeating compatriot Elsa Jacquemot in the final. With her title win, she reached a new career-high singles ranking of No 176.

== ITF Circuit finals ==
=== Singles: 19 (8 titles, 11 runner-ups) ===
| Legend W75 tournaments (1–2) W50 tournaments (1–2) W25/35 tournaments (1–4) W15 tournaments (5–3) | Finals by surface Hard (8–11) |

| Result | W–L | Date | Tournament | Tier | Surface | Opponent | Score |
|---|---|---|---|---|---|---|---|
| Loss | 0–1 | Mar 2022 | ITF Andrézieux-Bouthéon, France | W15 | Hard | (Switzerland) Xenia Knoll | 0–6, 5–7 |
| Loss | 0–2 | Mar 2022 | ITF Monastir, Tunisia | W15 | Hard | (Japan) Sakura Hosogi | 3–6, 3–6 |
| Win | 1–2 | Jul 2022 | ITF Monastir, Tunisia | W15 | Hard | (France) Yasmine Mansouri | 6–2, 6–2 |
| Loss | 1–3 | Oct 2022 | ITF Reims, France | W15 | Hard (i) | (Switzerland) Céline Naef | 2–6, 7–6^{(3)}, 3–6 |
| Win | 2–3 | Oct 2022 | ITF Monastir, Tunisia | W15 | Hard | (China) Yao Xinxin | 7–6^{(5)}, 6–3 |
| Win | 3–3 | Nov 2022 | ITF Monastir, Tunisia | W15 | Hard | (Germany) Emily Welker | 6–4, 6–2 |
| Loss | 3–4 | Oct 2023 | ITF Faro, Portugal | W25 | Hard | (France) Harmony Tan | 0–6, 2–6 |
| Loss | 3–5 | Jan 2024 | GB Pro-Series Loughborough, United Kingdom | W35 | Hard (i) | (United Kingdom) Sonay Kartal | 4–6, 1–6 |
| Loss | 3–6 | Feb 2024 | Open de l'Isère, France | W75 | Hard (i) | Aliona Falei | 1–6, 6–4, 4–6 |
| Loss | 3–7 | Feb 2024 | Wiphold International, South Africa | W50 | Hard | (Israel) Lina Glushko | 3–6, 5–7 |
| Win | 4–7 | Jun 2024 | ITF La Marsa, Tunisia | W35 | Hard | (Belgium) Lara Salden | 6–1, 6–3 |
| Loss | 4–8 | Jul 2024 | ITF Nottingham, United Kingdom | W50 | Hard | (United Kingdom) Heather Watson | 3–6, 0–6 |
| Loss | 4–9 | Sep 2024 | ITF Féminin Le Neubourg, France | W75 | Hard | (France) Tessah Andrianjafitrimo | 2–6, 4–6 |
| Win | 5–9 | Jan 2025 | Open Andrézieux-Bouthéon 42, France | W75 | Hard (i) | (France) Elsa Jacquemot | 1–6, 6–3, 6–4 |
| Loss | 5–10 | Feb 2025 | ITF Manchester, United Kingdom | W35 | Hard (i) | (Canada) Victoria Mboko | 6–7^{(0)}, 2–6 |
| Win | 6–10 | Jun 2025 | ITF Monastir, Tunisia | W15 | Hard | (Japan) Rina Saigo | 6–1, 6–2 |
| Win | 7–10 | Oct 2025 | ITF Monastir, Tunisia | W15 | Hard | (Poland) Amelia Paszun | 6–4, 6–3 |
| Win | 8–10 | Oct 2025 | ITF Cherbourg-en-Cotentin, France | W50 | Hard (i) | (France) Tiphanie Lemaître | 3–6, 6–1, 7–5 |
| Loss | 8–11 | Oct 2026 | ITF Birmingham, United Kingdom | W35 | Hard (i) | (United Kingdom) Alicia Dudeney | 4–6, 3–6 |

=== Doubles: 4 (1 title, 3 runner-ups) ===
| Legend W25 tournaments (0–2) W15 tournaments (1–1) | Finals by surface Hard (1–2) Clay (0–1) |

| Result | W–L | Date | Tournament | Tier | Surface | Partner | Opponent | Score |
|---|---|---|---|---|---|---|---|---|
| Loss | 0–1 | Jan 2020 | ITF Petit-Bourg, France | W25 | Hard | (France) Mylène Halemai | (Brazil) Laura Pigossi (Netherlands) Rosalie van der Hoek | 2–6, 1–6 |
| Win | 1–1 | Feb 2020 | ITF Monastir, Tunisia | W15 | Hard | (France) Mylène Halemai | (Romania) Ilona Georgiana Ghioroaie (Russia) Anastasia Pribylova | 1–6, 6–3, [10–6] |
| Loss | 1–2 | Feb 2022 | ITF Monastir, Tunisia | W15 | Hard | (France) Océane Babel | (Greece) Eleni Kordolaimi (Egypt) Merna Rafaat | 3–6, 6–0, [8–10] |
| Loss | 1–3 | Jul 2023 | ITF Aschaffenburg, Germany | W25 | Clay | (France) Lucie Nguyen Tan | Elena Pridankina (Czech Republic) Ivana Šebestová | 6–2, 2–6, [5–10] |
