= Astrid Lew Yan Foon =

French tennis player

- Country (sports): France
- Born: 15 August 2005 (age 21) Quimper, France
- Plays: Right-handed
- Prize money: $82,089

Singles
- Career record: 125–96
- Career titles: 1 ITF
- Highest ranking: No. 351 (24 November 2025)
- Current ranking: No. 538 (21 September 2026)

Doubles
- Career record: 38–43
- Career titles: 2 ITF
- Highest ranking: No. 532 (24 June 2024)
- Current ranking: No. 1,053 (21 September 2026)
- Last updated on: 25 September 2026.

Astrid Lew Yan Foon (born 15 August 2005) is a French tennis player.

Lew Yan Foon has a career-high singles ranking by the WTA of 351, achieved on 24 November 2025, and a best doubles ranking of world No. 532, achieved on 24 June 2024.

== Career ==
She made her WTA Tour main-draw debut as a qualifier at the 2025 Chennai Open, where she lost her first-round match against the defending champion, Linda Fruhvirtová.

== ITF Circuit finals ==
=== Singles: 3 (1 title, 2 runner-ups) ===
Legend W35 tournaments (0–1) W15 tournaments (1–1)	Finals by surface Hard (1–1) Clay (0–1)

Result	W–L	Date	Tournament	Tier	Surface	Opponent	Score
Win	1–0	Jan 2025	ITF Monastir, Tunisia	W15	Hard	(Germany) Lara Schmidt	3–0 ret.
Loss	1–1	Feb 2025	ITF Manacor, Spain	W15	Hard	(Bulgaria) Elizara Yaneva	1–5 ret.
Loss	1–2	Jul 2025	ITF Horb, Germany	W35	Clay	(South Korea) Park So-hyun	2–6, 6–1, 6–7^{(4)}

=== Doubles: 5 (2 titles, 3 runner-ups) ===
Legend W35 tournaments (0–1) W15 tournaments (2–2)	Finals by surface Hard (0–1) Clay (2–2)

Result	W–L	Date	Tournament	Tier	Surface	Partner	Opponents	Score
Win	1–0	Jul 2023	ITF Casablanca, Morocco	W15	Clay	(Switzerland) Marie Mettraux	(Italy) Alessandra Teodosescu (Italy) Federica Urgesi	7–6^{(4)}, 7–6^{(5)}
Loss	1–1	Sep 2023	ITF Dijon, France	W15	Clay	(Switzerland) Marie Mettraux	(Belgium) Polina Bakhmutkina (Belgium) Chelsea Vanhoutte	7–6^{(2)}, 4–6, [8–10]
Loss	1–2	Oct 2023	ITF Monastir, Tunisia	W15	Hard	(France) Flavie Brugnone	(United Kingdom) Abigail Amos (Netherlands) Marente Sijbesma	4–6, 1–6
Loss	1–3	Feb 2024	ITF Hammamet, Tunisia	W35	Clay	(France) Emma Léné	(Romania) Oana Gavrilă (Greece) Sapfo Sakellaridi	1–6, 3–6
Win	2–3	Apr 2024	ITF Gonesse, France	W15	Clay (i)	(France) Émeline Dartron	(Belgium) Tilwith Di Girolami (France) Laïa Petretic	3–6, 6–0, [13–11]
