= 2019 Engie Open Saint-Gaudens Occitanie =

- Date: 13–19 May 2019
- Edition: 23rd
- Category: ITF Women's World Tennis Tour
- Prize money: $60,000
- Surface: Clay
- Location: Saint-Gaudens, France

Champions

Singles
- (Russia) Anna Kalinskaya

Doubles
- (Italy) Martina Di Giuseppe / (Italy) Giulia Gatto-Monticone
← 2018 ·	Open Saint-Gaudens Occitanie	· 2021 →

The 2019 Engie Open Saint-Gaudens Occitanie was a professional tennis tournament played on outdoor clay courts. It was the twenty-third edition of the tournament which was part of the 2019 ITF Women's World Tennis Tour. It took place in Saint-Gaudens, France between 13 and 19 May 2019.

== Singles main-draw entrants ==
=== Seeds ===
Country	Player	Rank^{1}	Seed
RUS	Vitalia Diatchenko	80	1
ROU	Ana Bogdan	127	2
NED	Arantxa Rus	128	3
GBR	Harriet Dart	136	4
CZE	Tereza Martincová	156	5
RUS	Liudmila Samsonova	159	6
ITA	Giulia Gatto-Monticone	162	7
RUS	Sofya Zhuk	166	8

- ^{1} Rankings are as of 6 May 2019.

=== Other entrants ===
The following players received wildcards into the singles main draw:

- (France) Audrey Albié
- (France) Harmony Tan
- (United Kingdom) Eden Silva
- (France) Margot Yerolymos

The following player received entry using a junior exempt:

- (United States) Cori Gauff

The following players received entry from the qualifying draw:

- (France) Tessah Andrianjafitrimo
- (Hungary) Gréta Arn
- (Kazakhstan) Anna Danilina
- (Croatia) Jana Fett
- (Russia) Valentina Ivakhnenko
- (Serbia) Nina Stojanović

The following players received entry as lucky losers:

- (Belgium) Marie Benoît
- (Italy) Lucia Bronzetti

== Champions ==
=== Singles ===
- (Russia) Anna Kalinskaya def. (Romania) Ana Bogdan, 6–3, 6–4

=== Doubles ===
- (Italy) Martina Di Giuseppe / (Italy) Giulia Gatto-Monticone def. (Russia) Anna Kalinskaya / (Russia) Sofya Lansere, 6–1, 6–1
