= Anna Kalinskaya career statistics =

Career finals
Discipline	Type	Won	Lost	Total
Singles	Grand Slam	–	–	–
Singles	WTA Finals	–	–	–
Singles	WTA 1000	0	1	1
Singles	WTA Tour	0	2	2
Singles	Olympics	–	–	–
Singles	Total	0	3	3
Doubles	Grand Slam	–	–	–
Doubles	WTA Finals	–	–	–
Doubles	WTA 1000	1	0	1
Doubles	WTA Tour	3	5	8
Doubles	Olympics	–	–	–
Doubles	Total	4	5	9

Kalinskaya in 2025

This is a list of the main career statistics of professional tennis player Anna Kalinskaya. She was a quarterfinalist at the 2024 Australian Open and the runner-up at one WTA 1000 tournament — the 2024 Dubai Tennis Championships.

In doubles, she reached the quarterfinals at the 2023 Australian Open and the 2025 Wimbledon and won one WTA 1000 tournament, the 2025 Mutua Madrid Open, partnering with Sorana Cîrstea.

== Performance timelines ==
Key
W	F	SF	QF	#R	RR	Q#	P#	DNQ	A	Z#	PO	G	S	B	NMS	NTI	P	NH

(W) winner; (F) finalist; (SF) semifinalist; (QF) quarterfinalist; (#R) rounds 4, 3, 2, 1; (RR) round-robin stage; (Q#) qualification round; (P#) preliminary round; (DNQ) did not qualify; (A) absent; (Z#) Davis/Fed Cup Zonal Group (with number indication) or (PO) play-off; (G) gold, (S) silver or (B) bronze Olympic/Paralympic medal; (NMS) not a Masters tournament; (NTI) not a Tier I tournament; (P) postponed; (NH) not held; (SR) strike rate (events won / competed); (W–L) win–loss record.
To avoid confusion and double counting, these charts are updated at the conclusion of a tournament or when the player's participation has ended.

Only main-draw results in WTA Tour, Grand Slam tournaments, Billie Jean King Cup, United Cup, Hopman Cup and Olympic Games are included in win–loss records.

=== Singles ===
Current through the 2026 French Open.

Tournament	2016	2017	2018	2019	2020	2021	2022	2023	2024	2025	2026	SR	W–L	Win %
Grand Slam tournaments
Australian Open	A	Q1	1R	1R	1R	Q2	Q1	1R	QF	A	3R	0 / 6	6–6	50%
French Open	A	Q1	Q3	Q1	1R	Q1	1R	A	2R	1R	QF	0 / 5	5–5	50%
Wimbledon	A	Q1	Q3	1R	NH	1R	A (Note: Suspended due to the ban of Russian and Belarusian athletes in light of the Russian invasion of Ukraine)	A	4R	2R	3R	0 / 5	6–5	55%
US Open	A	Q1	1R	2R	2R	Q2	2R	2R	3R	3R	4R	0 / 8	11–8	58%
Win–loss	0–0	0–0	0–2	1–3	1–3	0–1	1–2	1–2	10–4	3–3	11–4	0 / 24	28–24	54%
National representation
Billie Jean King Cup (Note: Formerly known as Fed Cup until 2020.)	A	PO (Note: Despite not being part of a team during World Group playoffs, Kalinskaya played in the World Group II.)	WG2	A	W (Note: Despite not being part of a team during Finals, Kalinskaya played in the qualifying round.)		Disqualified					1 / 1	0–1	0%
WTA 1000 tournaments
Qatar Open	A	NTI	A	NTI	A	NTI	A	NTI	1R	1R	QF	3 / 3	3–3	50%
Dubai Championships	NTI	A	NTI	A	NTI	A	NTI	Q1	F	1R	2R	0 / 3	6–3	67%
Indian Wells Open	A	A	A	A	NH	4R	3R	2R	3R	1R	3R	0 / 6	8–6	57%
Miami Open	A	A	A	A	NH	3R	3R (Note: Withdrew during the tournament. Not counted as a loss.)	2R	4R	3R	2R	0 / 6	8–4	67%
Madrid Open	A	A	A	A	NH	Q1	A	3R	2R	3R	2R	0 / 4	3–4	43%
Italian Open	A	A	A	A	Q2	A	A	3R	3R	2R	4R	0 / 4	5–4	56%
Canadian Open	A	A	A	A	NH	A	A	A	3R	3R	3R	0 / 3	5–3	63%
Cincinnati Open	A	A	A	A	1R	A	2R	A	2R	QF	3R	0 / 5	7–5	55%
China Open	A	A	A	A	Not Held			A	4R	2R	2R	0 / 3	2–3	50%
Wuhan Open	A	A	A	A	Not Held				2R	1R	A	0 / 2	1–2	33%
Guadalajara Open	Not Held						QF	A	Not Tier I			0 / 1	3–1	75%
Win–loss	0–0	0–0	0–0	0–0	0–1	5–2	8–3	6–4	13–8	7–10	9–9	0 / 39	50–38	57%
Career statistics
	2016	2017	2018	2019	2020	2021	2022	2023	2024	2025	2026	SR	W–L	Win %
Tournaments	1	6	8	7	6	14	15	12	19	21	16	Career total: 125		
Titles	0	0	0	0	0	0	0	0	0	0		Career total: 0		
Finals	0	0	0	0	0	0	0	0	2	1		Career total: 3		
Hard win–loss	0–1	1–2	0–5	7–5	1–5	11–9	14–7	9–9	22–11	19–15	16–11	0 / 81	100–80	56%
Clay win–loss	0–0	2–2	0–3	0–0	0–1	1–3	1–4	7–3	3–5	5–4	8–4	0 / 30	27–29	48%
Grass win–loss	0–0	0–2	0–1	0–2	NH	0–2	2–3	0–0	7–2	1–1	3–3	0 / 16	13–16	45%
Overall win–loss	0–1	3–6	0–9	7–7	1–6	12–14	17–14	16–12	32–18	25–20	27–18	0 / 127	136–122	53%
Year–end ranking (Note: 2015: WTA ranking–681.)	199	146	169	100	114	110	58	77	14	33		$5,184,913		

=== Doubles ===
Current through the 2026 French Open.

Tournament	2016	2017	2018	2019	2020	2021	2022	2023	2024	2025	2026	SR	W–L	Win %
Grand Slam tournaments
Australian Open	A	A	A	A	1R	3R	A	QF	3R	A	1R	0 / 5	7–5	64%
French Open	A	A	1R	A	1R	1R	2R	A	2R	A	A	0 / 5	2–5	29%
Wimbledon	A	A	Q2	A	NH	2R	A	A	A	QF		0 / 2	4–1	80%
US Open	A	A	A	3R	A	1R	1R	1R	2R	1R		0 / 6	3–6	38%
Win–loss	0–0	0–0	0–1	2–1	0–2	3–3	1–2	3–2	4–3	3–2	0–1	0 / 18	16–17	50%
WTA 1000 tournaments
Qatar Open	A	NTI	A	NTI	A	NTI	A	NTI	A	A	A	0 / 0	0–0	–
Dubai Championships	NTI	A	NTI	A	NTI	A	NTI	2R	A	A	A	0 / 1	1–1	50%
Miami Open	A	A	A	A	NH	A	A	2R	A	2R	A	0 / 2	2–2	50%
Madrid Open	A	A	A	A	NH	A	A	2R	A	W	A	1 / 2	6–0	100%
Italian Open	A	A	A	A	A	A	A	A (Note: Kalinskaya and Caty McNally were scheduled to play in the first round. However, they withdrew right before their match against Desirae Krawczyk and Demi Schuurs. Since no one replaced them, it counted as a walkover.)	1R	A	2R	0 / 2	2–1	67%
Guadalajara Open	Not Held						1R	A	Not Tier I			0 / 1	0–1	0%
Career statistics
Tournaments	1	5	6	7	3	9	8	6		5		Career total: 50		
Titles	0	0	0	1	0	1	1	0	0	1		Career total: 4		
Finals	0	0	0	2	0	2	2	0	1	2		Career total: 7		
Overall win–loss	1–1	5–4	5–7	13–5	1–3	13–7	10–5			14-4		4 / 50	55–36	60%
Year-end ranking	154	133	121	81	105	90	78	76	139					

== Significant finals ==
=== WTA 1000 tournaments ===
==== Singles: 1 (1 runner-up) ====
Result	Year	Tournament	Surface	Opponent	Score
Loss	2024	Dubai Championships	Hard	(Italy) Jasmine Paolini	6–4, 5–7, 5–7

==== Doubles: 1 (1 title) ====
Result	Year	Tournament	Surface	Partner	Opponents	Score
Win	2025	Madrid Open	Clay	(Romania) Sorana Cîrstea	Veronika Kudermetova (Belgium) Elise Mertens	6–7^{(10–12)}, 6–2, [12–10]

== WTA Tour finals ==
=== Singles: 3 (3 runner-ups) ===
Legend WTA 1000 (0–1) WTA 500 (0–2)	Finals by surface Hard (0–2) Grass (0–1)	Finals by setting Outdoor (0–2)

Result	W–L	Date	Tournament	Tier	Surface	Opponent	Score
Loss	0–1	Feb 2024	Dubai Championships, UAE	WTA 1000	Hard	(Italy) Jasmine Paolini	6–4, 5–7, 5–7
Loss	0–2	Jun 2024	Berlin Ladies Open, Germany	WTA 500	Grass	(United States) Jessica Pegula	7–6^{(7–0)}, 4–6, 6–7^{(3–7)}
Loss	0–3	Jul 2025	Washington Open, United States	WTA 500	Hard	(Canada) Leylah Fernandez	1–6, 2–6

=== Doubles: 9 (4 titles, 5 runner-ups) ===
Legend WTA 1000 (1–0) Premier / WTA 500 (1–3) International / WTA 250 (2–2)	Finals by surface Hard (2–5) Clay (2–0)	Finals by setting Outdoor (3–4) Indoor (1–1)

Result	W–L	Date	Tournament	Tier	Surface	Partner	Opponents	Score
Loss	0–1	Feb 2019	St. Petersburg Trophy, Russia	Premier	Hard (i)	(Slovakia) Viktória Kužmová	(Russia) Ekaterina Makarova (Russia) Margarita Gasparyan	5–7, 5–7
Win	1–1	May 2019	Prague Open, Czech Republic	International	Clay	(Slovakia) Viktória Kužmová	(United States) Nicole Melichar (Czech Republic) Květa Peschke	4–6, 7–5, [10–7]
Loss	1–2	Feb 2021	Yarra Valley Classic, Australia	WTA 500	Hard	(Slovakia) Viktória Kužmová	(Japan) Shuko Aoyama (Japan) Ena Shibahara	3–6, 4–6
Win	2–2	Sep 2021	Portorož Open, Slovenia	WTA 250	Hard	(Slovakia) Tereza Mihalíková	(Serbia) Aleksandra Krunić (Netherlands) Lesley Pattinama Kerkhove	4–6, 6–2, [12–10]
Win	3–2	Feb 2022	St. Petersburg Trophy, Russia	WTA 500	Hard (i)	(United States) Caty McNally	(New Zealand) Erin Routliffe (Poland) Alicja Rosolska	6–3, 6–7^{(5–7)}, [10–4]
Loss	3–3	Aug 2022	Washington Open, United States	WTA 250	Hard	(United States) Caty McNally	(New Zealand) Erin Routliffe (United States) Jessica Pegula	3–6, 7–5, [10–12]
Loss	3–4	Sep 2023	Japan Women's Open, Japan	WTA 250	Hard	(Kazakhstan) Yulia Putintseva	(Germany) Anna-Lena Friedsam (Ukraine) Nadiia Kichenok	6–7^{(3–7)}, 3–6
Loss	3–5	Jan 2025	Brisbane International, Australia	WTA 500	Hard	(Australia) Priscilla Hon	Mirra Andreeva; Diana Shnaider	6–7^{(6–8)}, 5–7
Win	4–5	Apr 2025	Madrid Open, Spain	WTA 1000	Clay	(Romania) Sorana Cîrstea	Veronika Kudermetova (Belgium) Elise Mertens	6–7^{(10–12)}, 6–2, [12–10]

== WTA 125 finals ==
=== Singles: 2 (1 title, 1 runner-up) ===
Result	W–L	Date	Tournament	Surface	Opponent	Score
Loss	0–1	Oct 2023	Abierto Tampico, Mexico	Hard	(United States) Emina Bektas	3–6, 6–3, 6–7^{(3–7)}
Win	1–1	Nov 2023	Midland Classic, United States	Hard (i)	(Croatia) Jana Fett	7–5, 6–4

== ITF Circuit finals ==
=== Singles: 15 (7 titles, 8 runner-ups) ===
Legend $60,000 tournaments (1–1) $25,000 tournaments (5–4) $10,000 tournaments (1–3)	Finals by surface Hard (1–6) Clay (5–2) Carpet (1–0)

Result	W–L	Date	Tournament	Tier	Surface	Opponent	Score
Loss	0–1	Apr 2015	ITF Antalya, Turkey	10,000	Hard	(China) Lu Jiajing	2–6, 0–6
Loss	0–2	Nov 2015	ITF Port El Kantaoui, Tunisia	10,000	Hard	(Bosnia and Herzegovina) Ema Burgić Bucko	walkover
Loss	0–3	Apr 2016	ITF Manama, Bahrain	10,000	Hard	(Slovakia) Tereza Mihalíková	5–7, 1–6
Win	1–3	Apr 2016	ITF Shymkent, Kazakhstan	10,000	Clay	(Belarus) Ilona Kremen	6–4, 6–2
Win	2–3	Jun 2016	ITF Minsk, Belarus	25,000	Clay	(Belarus) Vera Lapko	6–4, 6–3
Loss	2–4	Jun 2016	ITF Minsk, Belarus	25,000	Clay	(Greece) Valentini Grammatikopoulou	3–6, 1–4 ret.
Win	3–4	Jul 2016	ITF Aschaffenburg, Germany	25,000	Clay	(Slovenia) Dalila Jakupovic	6–3, 2–6, 6–2
Loss	3–5	Aug 2016	ITF Plzeň, Czech Republic	25,000	Clay	(Russia) Natalia Vikhlyantseva	1–6, 3–6
Win	4–5	Aug 2016	ITF Kharkiv, Ukraine	25,000	Clay	(Greece) Valentini Grammatikopoulou	6–4, 1–6, 6–1
Loss	4–6	Nov 2016	ITF Minsk, Belarus	25,000	Hard (i)	(Russia) Anastasia Frolova	walkover
Loss	4–7	Sep 2017	Batumi Ladies Open, Georgia	25,000	Hard	(Uzbekistan) Nigina Abduraimova	6–3, 4–6, 3–6
Win	5–7	Oct 2017	ITF Óbidos, Portugal	25,000	Carpet	(Poland) Magdalena Fręch	6–3, 6–3
Loss	5–8	Mar 2018	Pingshan Open, China	60,000	Hard	(Slovakia) Viktória Kužmová	5–7, 3–6
Win	6–8	Jan 2019	Playford International, Australia	25,000	Hard	(Kazakhstan) Elena Rybakina	6–4, 6–4
Win	7–8	May 2019	Open Saint-Gaudens, France	60,000	Clay	(Romania) Ana Bogdan	6–3, 6–4

=== Doubles: 10 (9 titles, 1 runner-up) ===
Legend $100,000 tournaments (1–0) $60,000 tournaments (2–1) $25,000 tournaments (5–0) $10,000 tournaments (1–0)	Finals by surface Hard (4–0) Clay (5–1)

Result	W–L	Date	Tournament	Tier	Surface	Partner	Opponents	Score
Win	1–0	Jan 2015	ITF Sunrise, United States	25,000	Clay	(United States) Katerina Stewart	(Brazil) Paula Cristina Gonçalves (Brazil) Beatriz Haddad Maia	7–6^{(8–6)}, 5–7, [10–6]
Win	2–0	Apr 2016	ITF Manama, Bahrain	10,000	Hard	(Slovakia) Tereza Mihalíková	(Germany) Katharina Hering (Belgium) Kimberley Zimmermann	7–5, 6–3
Win	3–0	May 2016	Empire Slovak Open, Slovakia	100,000	Clay	(Slovakia) Tereza Mihalíková	(Russia) Evgeniya Rodina (Latvia) Anastasija Sevastova	6–1, 7–6^{(7–4)}
Win	4–0	Jun 2016	ITF Minsk, Belarus	25,000	Clay	(Greece) Valentini Grammatikopoulou	(Norway) Ulrikke Eikeri (Brazil) Laura Pigossi	4–6, 6–1, [10–2]
Win	5–0	Jul 2016	ITF Darmstadt, Germany	25,000	Clay	(Greece) Valentini Grammatikopoulou	(Bosnia and Herzegovina) Anita Husaric (Slovenia) Dalila Jakupovic	6–4, 6–1
Win	6–0	Nov 2016	ITF Minsk, Belarus	25,000	Hard (i)	(Belarus) Nika Shytkouskaya	(Belarus) Ilona Kremen (Belarus) Vera Lapko	6–2, 6–3
Win	7–0	Aug 2017	ITF Bad Saulgau, Germany	25,000	Clay	(Turkey) İpek Soylu	(Romania) Nicoleta Dascălu (Romania) Cristina Dinu	6–2, 6–2
Win	8–0	Mar 2018	Pingshan Open, China	60,000	Hard	(Slovakia) Viktória Kužmová	(Montenegro) Danka Kovinić (China) Wang Xinyu	6–4, 1–6, [10–7]
Win	9–0	Mar 2018	Open de Seine-et-Marne, France	60,000	Hard (i)	(Slovakia) Viktória Kužmová	(Czech Republic) Petra Krejsová (Czech Republic) Jesika Malečková	7–6^{(7–5)}, 6–1
Loss	9–1	May 2019	Open Saint-Gaudens, France	60,000	Clay	(Russia) Sofya Lansere	(Italy) Martina di Giuseppe (Italy) Giulia Gatto-Monticone	1–6, 1–6

== Junior Grand Slam tournament finals ==
=== Singles: 1 (runner-up) ===
Result	Year	Tournament	Surface	Opponent	Score
Loss	2015	French Open	Clay	(Spain) Paula Badosa	3–6, 3–6

=== Doubles: 2 (1 title, 1 runner-up) ===
Result	Year	Tournament	Surface	Partner	Opponents	Score
Loss	2015	US Open	Hard	(Russia) Anastasia Potapova	(Slovakia) Viktória Kužmová (Russia) Aleksandra Pospelova	5–7, 2–6
Win	2016	Australian Open	Hard	(Slovakia) Tereza Mihalíková	(Ukraine) Dayana Yastremska (Ukraine) Anastasia Zarycká	6–1, 6–1

== Fed Cup/Billie Jean King Cup participation ==
Legend
World Group round robin / finals round robin (0–0)
World Group playoffs / finals qualifying round (1–0)
World Group 2 round robin (1–1)
World Group 2 playoffs / finals playoffs (0–0)
Zone Group round robin / playoffs (0–0)

=== Singles (0–1) ===
Edition	Round	Date	Location	Against	Surface	Opponent	W/L	Result
2018	WG2	Feb 2018	Bratislava (SVK)	Slovakia	Hard (i)	Magdaléna Rybáriková	L	7–5, 3–6, 4–6

=== Doubles (2–1) ===
Edition	Round	Date	Location	Against	Surface	Partner	Opponents	W/L	Result
2017	WG2	Feb 2017	Moscow (RUS)	Chinese Taipei	Hard (i)	Anna Blinkova	Chan Chin-wei; Hsu Ching-wen	W	6–3, 7–5
2018	WG2	Feb 2018	Bratislava (SVK)	Slovakia	Hard (i)	Veronika Kudermetova	Jana Čepelová; Anna Karolína Schmiedlová	L	3–6, 2–6
2020–21	F QR	Feb 2020	Cluj-Napoca (ROU)	Romania	Hard (i)	Anna Blinkova	Jaqueline Cristian; Elena-Gabriela Ruse	W	6–3, 6–2

== WTA Tour career earnings ==
current as of 20 May 2024

Year	Grand Slam titles	WTA titles	Total titles	Earnings ($)	Money list rank
2014	0	0	0	850	1481
2015	0	0	0	4,417	788
2016	0	0	0	39,349	279
2017	0	0	0	75,066	226
2018	0	0	0	218,741	149
2019	0	1	1	334,862	123
2020	0	0	0	270,558	97
2021	0	1	1	375,250	110
2022	0	1	1	496,054	98
2023	0	0	0	525,733	93
2024	0	0	0	976,859	12
Career	0	3	3	3,319,779	214

== Wins against top 10 players ==
- Kalinskaya has a 14–16 (45%) record against players who were, at the time the match was played, ranked in the top 10.

No.	Player	Rk	Event	Surface	Rd	Score	Rk	Years	Ref
1.	(United States) Sloane Stephens	10	US Open, United States	Hard	1R	6–3, 6–4	127	2019	
2.	(Czech Republic) Karolína Plíšková	8	Miami Open, United States	Hard	2R	6–3, 6–3	84	2022	
3.	(Kazakhstan) Elena Rybakina	7	Madrid Open, Spain	Clay	2R	7–5, 4–6, 6–2	62	2023	
4.	(Czech Republic) Barbora Krejčíková	10	Adelaide International, Australia	Hard	1R	7–5, 3–6, 7–5	80	2024	
5.	(Latvia) Jeļena Ostapenko	9	Dubai Championships, UAE	Hard	3R	6–4, 7–5	40	2024	
6.	(United States) Coco Gauff	3	Dubai Championships, UAE	Hard	QF	2–6, 6–4, 6–2	40	2024	
7.	(Poland) Iga Świątek	1	Dubai Championships, UAE	Hard	SF	6–4, 6–4	40	2024	
8.	(Latvia) Jeļena Ostapenko	10	Miami Open, United States	Hard	3R	6–3, 6–1	25	2024	
9.	(Czech Republic) Markéta Vondroušová	6	Berlin Ladies Open, Germany	Grass	2R	5–5 ret.	24	2024	
10.	Aryna Sabalenka	3	Berlin Ladies Open, Germany	Grass	QF	5–1 ret.	24	2024	
11.	(United States) Madison Keys	5	Charleston Open, United States	Clay	3R	6–2, 6–4	33	2025	
12.	(United States) Jessica Pegula	3	Internationaux de Strasbourg, France	Clay	2R	4–6, 6–4, 6–2	30	2025	
13.	(United States) Amanda Anisimova	8	Cincinnati Open, United States	Hard	3R	7–5, 6–4	34	2025	
14.	(Ukraine) Elina Svitolina	9	Qatar Open, Qatar	Hard	3R	6–4, 6–3	28	2026	
15.	(Ukraine) Elina Svitolina	9	US Open, United States	Hard	3R	6–3, 2–6, 6–3	23	2026	

- Key: (Rk) first use, opponent rank; (Rd) round; (Rk) 2nd use, player rank; (Ref) reference; (F) final; (SF) semifinal; (QF) quarterfinal; (#R) rounds 4, 3, 2, 1; (RR) round-robin stage; (Q#) qualifying rounds or stages (3), 2, 1.
