= 2018 Engie Open Saint-Gaudens Occitanie =

- Date: 14–20 May
- Edition: 22nd
- Category: ITF Women's Circuit
- Prize money: $60,000
- Surface: Clay
- Location: Saint-Gaudens, France

Champions

Singles
- (Belarus) Vera Lapko

Doubles
- (Australia) Naiktha Bains / (United States) Francesca Di Lorenzo
← 2017 ·	Open Saint-Gaudens Occitanie	· 2019 →

The 2018 Engie Open Saint-Gaudens Occitanie was a professional tennis tournament played on outdoor clay courts. It was the twenty-second edition of the tournament and was part of the 2018 ITF Women's Circuit. It took place in Saint-Gaudens, France, on 14–20 May 2018.

== Singles main draw entrants ==
=== Seeds ===
Country	Player	Rank^{1}	Seed
BLR	Vera Lapko	92	1
NED	Arantxa Rus	107	2
FRA	Océane Dodin	110	3
NED	Richèl Hogenkamp	122	4
BUL	Viktoriya Tomova	144	5
SUI	Patty Schnyder	151	6
AUS	Olivia Rogowska	153	7
JPN	Misaki Doi	161	8

- ^{1} Rankings as of 7 May 2018.

=== Other entrants ===
The following players received a wildcard into the singles main draw:

- (France) Tessah Andrianjafitrimo
- (France) Manon Arcangioli
- (United Kingdom) Eden Silva
- (France) Margot Yerolymos

The following player received entry using a protected ranking:

- (Netherlands) Quirine Lemoine

The following players received entry from the qualifying draw:

- (Australia) Kimberly Birrell
- (France) Priscilla Heise
- (Russia) Yana Sizikova
- (France) Harmony Tan

== Champions ==
=== Singles ===
- (Belarus) Vera Lapko def. (Netherlands) Quirine Lemoine, 6–2, 6–4

=== Doubles ===
- (Australia) Naiktha Bains / (United States) Francesca Di Lorenzo def. (France) Manon Arcangioli / (France) Shérazad Reix, 6–4, 1–6, [11–9]
