= 2021 Engie Open Saint-Gaudens Occitanie =

Tennis tournament

- Date: 10–16 May 2021
- Edition: 24th
- Category: ITF Women's World Tennis Tour
- Prize money: $60,000
- Surface: Clay
- Location: Saint-Gaudens, France

Champions

Singles
- (France) Clara Burel

Doubles
- (France) Estelle Cascino / (France) Jessika Ponchet
← 2019 ·	Open Saint-Gaudens Occitanie	· 2022 →

The 2021 Engie Open Saint-Gaudens Occitanie was a professional women's tennis tournament played on outdoor clay courts. It was the twenty-fourth edition of the tournament which was part of the 2021 ITF Women's World Tennis Tour. It took place in Saint-Gaudens, France between 10 and 16 May 2021.

== Singles main-draw entrants ==
=== Seeds ===
Country	Player	Rank^{1}	Seed
SUI	Viktorija Golubic	84	1
FRA	Océane Dodin	117	2
SVK	Kristína Kučová	151	3
JPN	Kurumi Nara	153	4
AUT	Barbara Haas	156	5
~~FRA~~	~~Harmony Tan~~	~~157~~	~~6~~
FRA	Clara Burel	164	7
ESP	Cristina Bucșa	167	8
ROU	Elena-Gabriela Ruse	175	9

- ^{1} Rankings are as of 26 April 2021.

=== Other entrants ===
The following players received wildcards into the singles main draw:

- (France) Océane Babel
- (France) Aubane Droguet
- (Spain) María Gutiérrez Carrasco
- (France) Séléna Janicijevic

The following player received entry using a protected ranking:

- (Romania) Alexandra Dulgheru

The following player received entry as a junior exempt:

- (France) Elsa Jacquemot

The following players received entry from the qualifying draw:

- (France) Tessah Andrianjafitrimo
- (France) Loïs Boisson
- (Hungary) Anna Bondár
- (Germany) Katharina Gerlach
- (Germany) Tayisiya Morderger
- (France) Diane Parry
- (France) Alice Ramé
- (France) Margot Yerolymos

The following player received entry as a lucky loser:

- (Belgium) Kimberley Zimmermann

== Champions ==
=== Singles ===
- (France) Clara Burel def. (Romania) Alexandra Dulgheru, 6–2, 1–6, 6–2

=== Doubles ===
- (France) Estelle Cascino / (France) Jessika Ponchet def. (United Kingdom) Eden Silva / (Belgium) Kimberley Zimmermann, 0–6, 7–5, [10–7]
