= 2022 Edge Open Saint-Gaudens Occitanie =

Tennis tournament

- Date: 9–15 May 2022
- Edition: 25th
- Category: ITF Women's World Tennis Tour
- Prize money: $60,000
- Surface: Clay / Outdoor
- Location: Saint-Gaudens, France

Champions

Singles
- (Switzerland) Ylena In-Albon

Doubles
- (Mexico) Fernanda Contreras / (Switzerland) Lulu Sun
← 2021 ·	Open Saint-Gaudens Occitanie	· 2023 →

The 2022 Edge Open Saint-Gaudens Occitanie was a professional tennis tournament played on outdoor clay courts. It was the twenty-fifth edition of the tournament which was part of the 2022 ITF Women's World Tennis Tour. It took place in Saint-Gaudens, France between 9 and 15 May 2022.

== Singles main draw entrants ==
=== Seeds ===
Country	Player	Rank^{1}	Seed
SUI	Ylena In-Albon	141	1
CHN	Yuan Yue	142	2
UKR	Daria Snigur	143	3
AUS	Astra Sharma	148	4
	Anastasia Tikhonova	176	5
GRE	Valentini Grammatikopoulou	183	6
JPN	Nao Hibino	195	7
SUI	Simona Waltert	203	8

- ^{1} Rankings are as of 25 April 2022.

=== Other entrants ===
The following players received wildcards into the singles main draw:

- Kristina Dmitruk
- (France) Mallaurie Noël
- (France) Alice Ramé
- (France) Margot Yerolymos

The following players received entry from the qualifying draw:

- (France) Julie Belgraver
- (France) Sara Cakarevic
- (France) Émeline Dartron
- (Japan) Nagi Hanatani
- (Burundi) Sada Nahimana
- (Romania) Ioana Loredana Roșca
- (United States) Sofia Sewing
- (Switzerland) Lulu Sun

The following player received entry as a lucky loser:

- (Bulgaria) Julia Stamatova

== Champions ==
=== Singles ===
- (Switzerland) Ylena In-Albon def. (Brazil) Carolina Alves, 4–6, 6–4, 6–3

=== Doubles ===
- (Mexico) Fernanda Contreras / (Switzerland) Lulu Sun def. (Greece) Valentini Grammatikopoulou / Anastasia Tikhonova, 7–5, 6–2
