= 2017 Engie Open Saint-Gaudens Occitanie =

- Date: 15–21 May
- Edition: 21st
- Category: ITF Women's Circuit
- Prize money: $60,000
- Surface: Clay
- Location: Saint-Gaudens, France

Champions

Singles
- (Netherlands) Richèl Hogenkamp

Doubles
- (Chinese Taipei) Chang Kai-chen / (China) Han Xinyun
← 2016 ·	Open Saint-Gaudens Occitanie	· 2018 →

The 2017 Engie Open Saint-Gaudens Occitanie was a professional tennis tournament played on outdoor clay courts. It was the twenty-first edition of the tournament and part of the 2017 ITF Women's Circuit, offering a total of $60,000 in prize money. It took place in Saint-Gaudens, France, from 15–21 May 2017.

== Point distribution ==
Event	W	F	SF	QF	Round of 16	Round of 32	Q	Q2	Q3
Singles	80	48	29	15	8	1	5	3	1
Doubles	80	48	29	15	1	—	—	—	—

== Singles main draw entrants ==
=== Seeds ===
Country	Player	Rank^{1}	Seed
RUS	Irina Khromacheva	92	1
TPE	Hsieh Su-wei	104	2
ROU	Ana Bogdan	105	3
TPE	Chang Kai-chen	106	4
CHN	Han Xinyun	110	5
NED	Richèl Hogenkamp	112	6
~~BRA~~	~~Beatriz Haddad Maia~~	~~115~~	~~7~~
BLR	Aryna Sabalenka	116	8
SLO	Dalila Jakupović	129	9

- ^{1} Rankings as of 8 May 2017

=== Other entrants ===
The following players received wildcards into the singles main draw:

- (France) Audrey Albié
- (France) Tessah Andrianjafitrimo
- (France) Victoria Muntean
- (United Kingdom) Eden Silva

The following players received entry into the singles main draw by a junior exempt:

- (Switzerland) Rebeka Masarova

The following players received entry from the qualifying draw:

- (France) Amandine Hesse
- (Russia) Alexandra Panova
- (Brazil) Teliana Pereira
- (France) Jessika Ponchet

The following player received entry by a lucky loser:

- (Australia) Storm Sanders

== Champions ==
=== Singles ===
- (Netherlands) Richèl Hogenkamp def. (United States) Kristie Ahn, 6–2, 6–4

=== Doubles ===
- (Chinese Taipei) Chang Kai-chen / (China) Han Xinyun def. (Paraguay) Montserrat González / (Spain) Sílvia Soler Espinosa, 7–5, 6–1
