= 2011 Open International Féminin Midi-Pyrénées Saint-Gaudens Comminges =

- Date: 9–15 May
- Edition: 15th
- Category: ITF Women's Circuit
- Prize money: $50,000+H
- Surface: Clay
- Location: Saint-Gaudens, France

Champions

Singles
- (Russia) Anastasia Pivovarova

Doubles
- (France) Caroline Garcia / (France) Aurélie Védy
← 2010 ·	Open International Féminin Midi-Pyrénées Saint-Gaudens Comminges	· 2012 →

The 2011 Open International Féminin Midi-Pyrénées Saint-Gaudens Comminges was a professional tennis tournament played on outdoor clay courts. It was the 15th edition of the tournament which was part of the 2011 ITF Women's Circuit, offering a total of $50,000+H in prize money. It took place in Saint-Gaudens, France, on 9–15 May 2011.

== Singles entrants ==
=== Seeds ===
Country	Player	Rank^{1}	Seed
CHN	Zhang Shuai	78	1
GEO	Anna Tatishvili	105	2
NED	Arantxa Rus	106	3
RUS	Anastasia Pivovarova	108	4
RUS	Vesna Dolonts	111	5
FRA	Pauline Parmentier	124	6
USA	Jamie Hampton	125	7
CHN	Han Xinyun	128	8

- Rankings are as of 2 May 2011

=== Other entrants ===
The following players received wildcards into the singles main draw:

- (France) Claire de Gubernatis
- (France) Séverine Beltrame
- (France) Claire Feuerstein
- (France) Kristina Mladenovic

The following players received entry from the qualifying draw:

- (United States) Gail Brodsky
- (France) Julie Coin
- (United Kingdom) Tara Moore
- (Switzerland) Conny Perrin

== Champions ==
=== Singles ===
- (Russia) Anastasia Pivovarova def. (Netherlands) Arantxa Rus 7–6^{(7–4)}, 6–7^{(3–7)}, 6–2

=== Doubles ===
(France) Caroline Garcia / (France) Aurélie Védy def. (Russia) Anastasia Pivovarova / (Ukraine) Olga Savchuk 6–3, 6–3
