= 2021 Engie Open Saint-Gaudens Occitanie – Singles =

Singles
- 2021 Engie Open Saint-Gaudens Occitanie

Final
- Champion: (France) Clara Burel
- Runner-up: (Romania) Alexandra Dulgheru
- Score: 6–2, 1–6, 6–2

Events
Singles	Doubles
← 2019 ·	Open Saint-Gaudens Occitanie	· 2022 →

Anna Kalinskaya was the defending champion having won the previous edition in 2019, but chose not to participate.

Clara Burel won the title, defeating Alexandra Dulgheru in the final, 6–2, 1–6, 6–2.

== Seeds ==
1. (Switzerland) Viktorija Golubic (semifinals)
2. (France) Océane Dodin (first round)
3. (Slovakia) Kristína Kučová (quarterfinals)
4. (Japan) Kurumi Nara (quarterfinals)
5. (Austria) Barbara Haas (quarterfinals)
6. (France) Harmony Tan (withdrew)
7. (France) Clara Burel (champion)
8. (Spain) Cristina Bucșa (first round)
9. (Romania) Elena-Gabriela Ruse (second round)

== Draw ==
=== Key ===
- Q = Qualifier
- WC = Wild card
- LL = Lucky loser
- Alt = Alternate
- SE = Special exempt
- PR = Protected ranking
- ITF = ITF entry
- JE = Junior exempt
- w/o = Walkover
- r = Retired
- d = Defaulted
- SR = Special ranking

=== Finals ===
Semifinals
1	(Switzerland) Viktorija Golubic	5	0
PR	(Romania) Alexandra Dulgheru	7	6
7	(France) Clara Burel	6	6^{6}	6
Q	(Hungary) Anna Bondár	3	7^{8}	3

Final
PR	(Romania) Alexandra Dulgheru	2	6	2
7	(France) Clara Burel	6	1	6

=== Top half ===
First round
1	(Switzerland) V Golubic	6	6
Q	(Germany) T Morderger	4	4
(Bulgaria) I Shinikova	3	5
Q	(France) L Boisson	6	7
Q	(France) A Ramé	3	1
Q	(France) D Parry	6	6
(Brazil) B Haddad Maia	6	6
8	(Spain) C Bucșa	0	2
3	(Slovakia) K Kučová	6	6
Q	(France) T Andrianjafitrimo	3	2
JE	(France) E Jacquemot	5	3
LL	(Belgium) K Zimmermann	7	6
PR	(Romania) A Dulgheru	6	0
(Romania) LI Paar	0	0^{r}
WC	(France) A Droguet	0	7^{10}	3
9	(Romania) E-G Ruse	6	6^{8}	6

Second round
1	(Switzerland) V Golubic	6	6
Q	(France) L Boisson	2	4
Q	(France) D Parry
(Brazil) B Haddad Maia	w/o
3	(Slovakia) K Kučová	6	6
LL	(Belgium) K Zimmermann	2	4
PR	(Romania) A Dulgheru	6	6
9	(Romania) E-G Ruse	3	4

Quarterfinals
1	(Switzerland) V Golubic	6^{2}	6	6
(Brazil) B Haddad Maia	7^{7}	4	2
3	(Slovakia) K Kučová	5	4
PR	(Romania) A Dulgheru	7	6

Semifinals
1	(Switzerland) V Golubic	5	0
PR	(Romania) A Dulgheru	7	6

=== Bottom half ===
First round
7	(France) C Burel	7	3	6
(Georgia (country)) M Bolkvadze	5	6	4
Q	(France) M Yerolymos	6	2	6
(Italy) M Di Giuseppe	2	6	3
(Australia) D Aiava	6	6
WC	(Spain) M Gutiérrez Carrasco	3	2
(Chinese Taipei) E-s Liang	7^{11}	2	6^{5}
4	(Japan) K Nara	6^{9}	6	7^{7}
5	(Austria) B Haas	7^{7}	6
WC	(France) S Janicijevic	6^{2}	1
WC	(France) O Babel	3	3
(Austria) J Grabher	6	6
Q	(Hungary) A Bondár	6	6
Q	(Germany) K Gerlach	3	3
(France) C Paquet	7	7
2	(France) O Dodin	5	5

Second round
7	(France) C Burel	6^{6}	7^{7}	6
Q	(France) M Yerolymos	7^{8}	6^{0}	4
(Australia) D Aiava	6	3	6^{6}
4	(Japan) K Nara	4	6	7^{8}
5	(Austria) B Haas	6	6
(Austria) J Grabher	4	2
Q	(Hungary) A Bondár	6	3	7
(France) C Paquet	2	6	5

Quarterfinals
7	(France) C Burel	7	6
4	(Japan) K Nara	5	2
5	(Austria) B Haas	1	7^{7}	3
Q	(Hungary) A Bondár	6	6^{4}	6

Semifinals
7	(France) C Burel	6	6^{6}	6
Q	(Hungary) A Bondár	3	7^{8}	3
