= 2018 Engie Open Saint-Gaudens Occitanie – Singles =

Singles
- 2018 Engie Open Saint-Gaudens Occitanie

Final
- Champion: (Belarus) Vera Lapko
- Runner-up: (Netherlands) Quirine Lemoine
- Score: 6–2, 6–4

Events
Singles	Doubles
← 2017 ·	Open Saint-Gaudens Occitanie	· 2019 →

Richèl Hogenkamp was the defending champion, but lost to Valentini Grammatikopoulou in the second round.

Vera Lapko won the title after defeating Quirine Lemoine 6–2, 6–4 in the final.

== Seeds ==
1. (Belarus) Vera Lapko (champion)
2. (Netherlands) Arantxa Rus (semifinals)
3. (France) Océane Dodin (first round, retired)
4. (Netherlands) Richèl Hogenkamp (second round)
5. (Bulgaria) Viktoriya Tomova (quarterfinals)
6. (Switzerland) Patty Schnyder (second round)
7. (Australia) Olivia Rogowska (first round)
8. (Japan) Misaki Doi (first round)

== Draw ==
=== Key ===
- Q = Qualifier
- WC = Wild card
- LL = Lucky loser
- Alt = Alternate
- SE = Special exempt
- PR = Protected ranking
- ITF = ITF entry
- JE = Junior exempt
- w/o = Walkover
- r = Retired
- d = Defaulted
- SR = Special ranking

=== Finals ===
Semifinals
1	(Belarus) Vera Lapko	3	6	6
(Australia) Jaimee Fourlis	6	4	2
PR	(Netherlands) Quirine Lemoine	7^{9}	6
2	(Netherlands) Arantxa Rus	6^{7}	3

Final
1	(Belarus) Vera Lapko	6	6
PR	(Netherlands) Quirine Lemoine	2	4

=== Top half ===
First round
1	(Belarus) V Lapko	7^{7}	6
(France) F Ferro	6^{5}	4
(Romania) I Bara	6	6
(Mexico) R Zarazúa	3	3
(Australia) E Perez	2	1
(Ukraine) K Zavatska	6	6
WC	(United Kingdom) E Silva	0	2
6	(Switzerland) P Schnyder	6	6
3	(France) O Dodin	0	1^{r}
(France) S Reix	6	3
WC	(France) M Arcangioli	4	3
Q	(France) P Heise	6	6
(Turkey) İ Soylu	5	2
Q	(Russia) Y Sizikova	7	6
(Australia) J Fourlis	6	4	6
7	(Australia) O Rogowska	4	6	4

Second round
1	(Belarus) V Lapko	6	6
(Romania) I Bara	4	2
(Ukraine) K Zavatska	0	6	6
6	(Switzerland) P Schnyder	6	4	2
(France) S Reix	w/o
Q	(France) P Heise
Q	(Russia) Y Sizikova	5	3
(Australia) J Fourlis	7	6

Quarterfinals
1	(Belarus) V Lapko	6	6
(Ukraine) K Zavatska	0	4
(France) S Reix	2	0
(Australia) J Fourlis	6	6

Semifinals
1	(Belarus) V Lapko	3	6	6
(Australia) J Fourlis	6	4	2

=== Bottom half ===
First round
8	(Japan) M Doi	5	4
PR	(Netherlands) Q Lemoine	7	6
(France) J Ponchet	7^{7}	2	2
(Russia) V Ivakhnenko	6^{4}	6	6
(Greece) V Grammatikopoulou	4	7	6
Q	(Australia) K Birrell	6	5	2
(France) M Georges	3	6	3
4	(Netherlands) R Hogenkamp	6	4	6
5	(Bulgaria) V Tomova	4	7	6
WC	(France) T Andrianjafitrimo	6	5	3
Q	(France) H Tan	6	3	6^{3}
(United States) F Di Lorenzo	3	6	7^{7}
(Italy) J Pieri	6	6
WC	(France) M Yerolymos	3	2
(France) A Hesse	1	4
2	(Netherlands) A Rus	6	6

Second round
PR	(Netherlands) Q Lemoine	6	6
(Russia) V Ivakhnenko	4	3
(Greece) V Grammatikopoulou	7^{7}	6
4	(Netherlands) R Hogenkamp	6^{3}	1
5	(Bulgaria) V Tomova	7	6
(United States) F Di Lorenzo	5	4
(Italy) J Pieri	7^{7}	1	0
2	(Netherlands) A Rus	6^{4}	6	6

Quarterfinals
PR	(Netherlands) Q Lemoine	6	6
(Greece) V Grammatikopoulou	2	4
5	(Bulgaria) V Tomova	0	5
2	(Netherlands) A Rus	6	7

Semifinals
PR	(Netherlands) Q Lemoine	7^{9}	6
2	(Netherlands) A Rus	6^{7}	3
