= 2019 Engie Open Saint-Gaudens Occitanie – Singles =

Singles
- 2019 Engie Open Saint-Gaudens Occitanie

Final
- Champion: (Russia) Anna Kalinskaya
- Runner-up: (Romania) Ana Bogdan
- Score: 6–3, 6–4

Events
Singles	Doubles
← 2018 ·	Open Saint-Gaudens Occitanie	· 2021 →

Vera Lapko was the defending champion, but chose not to participate.

Anna Kalinskaya won the title, defeating Ana Bogdan in the final, 6–3, 6–4.

== Seeds ==
1. (Russia) Vitalia Diatchenko (second round, retired)
2. (Romania) Ana Bogdan (final)
3. (Netherlands) Arantxa Rus (second round)
4. (United Kingdom) Harriet Dart (second round)
5. (Czech Republic) Tereza Martincová (semifinals, retired)
6. (Russia) Liudmila Samsonova (first round)
7. (Italy) Giulia Gatto-Monticone (quarterfinals)
8. (Russia) Sofya Zhuk (quarterfinals)

== Draw ==
=== Key ===
- Q = Qualifier
- WC = Wild card
- LL = Lucky loser
- Alt = Alternate
- SE = Special exempt
- PR = Protected ranking
- ITF = ITF entry
- JE = Junior exempt
- w/o = Walkover
- r = Retired
- d = Defaulted
- SR = Special ranking

=== Finals ===
Semifinals
(Russia) Anna Kalinskaya	6	6
Q	(Croatia) Jana Fett	3	1
5	(Czech Republic) Tereza Martincová	4	0^{r}
2	(Romania) Ana Bogdan	6	2

Final
(Russia) Anna Kalinskaya	6	6
2	(Romania) Ana Bogdan	3	4

=== Top half ===
First round
1	(Russia) V Diatchenko	7	4	6
(Argentina) P Ormaechea	5	6	2
WC	(United Kingdom) E Silva	2	1
(Russia) A Kalinskaya	6	6
WC	(France) M Yerolymos	6^{5}	3
LL	(Belgium) M Benoît	7^{7}	6
(France) A Hesse	6	5	4
8	(Russia) S Zhuk	4	7	6
3	(Netherlands) A Rus	6	6
(Netherlands) R Hogenkamp	2	3
Q	(Serbia) N Stojanović	2	3
(France) C Paquet	6	6
(Cyprus) R Șerban	2	2
(Japan) K Nara	6	6
Q	(Croatia) J Fett	6	7
6	(Russia) L Samsonova	2	5

Second round
1	(Russia) V Diatchenko	6	3	0^{r}
(Russia) A Kalinskaya	2	6	4
LL	(Belgium) M Benoît	4	6	6^{2}
8	(Russia) S Zhuk	6	3	7^{7}
3	(Netherlands) A Rus	6	5	6^{5}
(France) C Paquet	4	7	7^{7}
(Japan) K Nara	1	5
Q	(Croatia) J Fett	6	7

Quarterfinals
(Russia) A Kalinskaya	3	7	6
8	(Russia) S Zhuk	6	5	1
(France) C Paquet	7	2	5
Q	(Croatia) J Fett	5	6	7

Semifinals
(Russia) A Kalinskaya	6	6
Q	(Croatia) J Fett	3	1

=== Bottom half ===
First round
5	(Czech Republic) T Martincová	6	6
(France) J Ponchet	1	1
Q	(Hungary) G Arn	0	2
(Bulgaria) V Tomova	6	6
JE	(United States) C Gauff	6	6
LL	(Italy) L Bronzetti	4	4
Q	(Kazakhstan) A Danilina	4	0
4	(United Kingdom) H Dart	6	6
7	(Italy) G Gatto-Monticone	7^{7}	6
(Montenegro) D Kovinić	6^{4}	4
Q	(Russia) V Ivakhnenko	6	6
WC	(France) A Albié	2	3
WC	(France) H Tan	6	4	2
Q	(France) T Andrianjafitrimo	4	6	6
(Italy) M Di Giuseppe	3	1
2	(Romania) A Bogdan	6	6

Second round
5	(Czech Republic) T Martincová	6	6
(Bulgaria) V Tomova	0	3
JE	(United States) C Gauff	7	7
4	(United Kingdom) H Dart	5	5
7	(Italy) G Gatto-Monticone	4	6	6
Q	(Russia) V Ivakhnenko	6	2	4
Q	(France) T Andrianjafitrimo	1	0
2	(Romania) A Bogdan	6	6

Quarterfinals
5	(Czech Republic) T Martincová	6	4	6
JE	(United States) C Gauff	0	6	2
7	(Italy) G Gatto-Monticone	1	6^{4}
2	(Romania) A Bogdan	6	7^{7}

Semifinals
5	(Czech Republic) T Martincová	4	0^{r}
2	(Romania) A Bogdan	6	2
