= 2021 Engie Open Saint-Gaudens Occitanie – Doubles =

Doubles
- 2021 Engie Open Saint-Gaudens Occitanie

Final
- Champions: (France) Estelle Cascino (France) Jessika Ponchet
- Runners-up: (United Kingdom) Eden Silva (Belgium) Kimberley Zimmermann
- Score: 0–6, 7–5, [10–7]

Events
Singles	Doubles
← 2019 ·	Open Saint-Gaudens Occitanie	· 2022 →

Martina Di Giuseppe and Giulia Gatto-Monticone were the defending champions having won the previous edition in 2019, but chose not to participate.

Estelle Cascino and Jessika Ponchet won the title, defeating Eden Silva and Kimberley Zimmermann in the final, 0–6, 7–5, [10–7].

== Seeds ==
1. (United Kingdom) Eden Silva / (Belgium) Kimberley Zimmermann (final)
2. (France) Estelle Cascino / (France) Jessika Ponchet (champions)
3. (Germany) Tayisiya Morderger / (Germany) Yana Morderger (first round)
4. (Australia) Destanee Aiava / (Italy) Angelica Moratelli (semifinals)

== Draw ==
=== Key ===
- Q = Qualifier
- WC = Wild card
- LL = Lucky loser
- Alt = Alternate
- SE = Special exempt
- PR = Protected ranking
- ITF = ITF entry
- JE = Junior exempt
- w/o = Walkover
- r = Retired
- d = Defaulted
- SR = Special ranking

=== Draw ===
First round
(France) A Droguet (France) S Janicijevic	6	6
(Russia) D Astakhova (Russia) E Makarova	3	0
4	(Australia) D Aiava (Italy) A Moratelli	w/o
(Austria) J Grabher (China) Q Zheng
(France) A Albié (France) L Jeanjean	6^{2}	0
(France) E Jacquemot (France) L Wargnier	7^{7}	6
(Chinese Taipei) E-s Liang (Ukraine) V Strakhova	2	6	[11]
(Georgia (country)) M Bolkvadze (Bulgaria) I Shinikova	6	4	[9]
(France) O Babel (France) L Nguyen Tan	7^{7}	7
3	(Germany) T Morderger (Germany) Y Morderger	6^{4}	5
(France) T Andrianjafitrimo (France) C Monnet	6	3	[10]
(Spain) C Bucșa (Russia) V Koval	3	6	[7]
(Lithuania) J Mikulskytė (Romania) OG Simion	3	7	[5]
2	(France) E Cascino (France) J Ponchet	6	5	[10]

Quarterfinals
1	(United Kingdom) E Silva (Belgium) K Zimmermann	7	6
(France) A Droguet (France) S Janicijevic	5	3
4	(Australia) D Aiava (Italy) A Moratelli	w/o
(France) E Jacquemot (France) L Wargnier
(Chinese Taipei) E-s Liang (Ukraine) V Strakhova	6	6
(France) O Babel (France) L Nguyen Tan	1	1
(France) T Andrianjafitrimo (France) C Monnet	0	6	[7]
2	(France) E Cascino (France) J Ponchet	6	4	[10]

Semifinals
1	(United Kingdom) E Silva (Belgium) K Zimmermann	6	7^{8}
4	(Australia) D Aiava (Italy) A Moratelli	3	6^{6}
(Chinese Taipei) E-s Liang (Ukraine) V Strakhova	0	1
2	(France) E Cascino (France) J Ponchet	6	6

Final
1	(United Kingdom) E Silva (Belgium) K Zimmermann	6	5	[7]
2	(France) E Cascino (France) J Ponchet	0	7	[10]
