= 2018 Engie Open Saint-Gaudens Occitanie – Doubles =

Doubles
- 2018 Engie Open Saint-Gaudens Occitanie

Final
- Champions: (Australia) Naiktha Bains (United States) Francesca Di Lorenzo
- Runners-up: (France) Manon Arcangioli (France) Shérazad Reix
- Score: 6–4, 1–6, [11–9]

Events
Singles	Doubles
← 2017 ·	Open Saint-Gaudens Occitanie	· 2019 →

Chang Kai-chen and Han Xinyun were the defending champions, but both players chose not to participate.

Naiktha Bains and Francesca Di Lorenzo won the title, defeating Manon Arcangioli and Shérazad Reix in the final, 6–4, 1–6, [11–9].

== Seeds ==
1. (Russia) Anastasiya Komardina / (Russia) Yana Sizikova (semifinals)
2. (Netherlands) Quirine Lemoine / (Netherlands) Eva Wacanno (semifinals)
3. (Australia) Naiktha Bains / (United States) Francesca Di Lorenzo (champions)
4. (Italy) Cristiana Ferrando / (Argentina) María Irigoyen (first round)

== Draw ==
=== Key ===
- Q = Qualifier
- WC = Wild card
- LL = Lucky loser
- Alt = Alternate
- SE = Special exempt
- PR = Protected ranking
- ITF = ITF entry
- JE = Junior exempt
- w/o = Walkover
- r = Retired
- d = Defaulted
- SR = Special ranking

=== Draw ===
First round
(Poland) E Duda (Spain) A Redondo Gutiérrez	1	2
(Brazil) C Alves (Finland) M Eklund	6	6
4	(Italy) C Ferrando (Argentina) M Irigoyen	3	1
(France) M Arcangioli (France) S Reix	6	6
(France) E Arnal (France) É Ducos	1	0
(France) S Cakarevic (France) J Ponchet	6	6
(Poland) K Kawa (United Kingdom) E Silva	3	4
(United Kingdom) SB Grey (United Kingdom) O Nicholls	6	6
(Greece) V Grammatikopoulou (Netherlands) R van der Hoek	2	0^{r}
(France) T Andrianjafitrimo (France) F Ferro	6	2

Quarterfinals
1	(Russia) A Komardina (Russia) Y Sizikova	7	6
(Brazil) C Alves (Finland) M Eklund	5	0
(France) M Arcangioli (France) S Reix	6	0	[10]
(France) S Cakarevic (France) J Ponchet	1	6	[8]
(United Kingdom) SB Grey (United Kingdom) O Nicholls	6	4	[7]
3	(Australia) N Bains (United States) F Di Lorenzo	4	6	[10]
(France) T Andrianjafitrimo (France) F Ferro	6	6^{4}	[8]
2	(Netherlands) Q Lemoine (Netherlands) E Wacanno	1	7^{7}	[10]

Semifinals
1	(Russia) A Komardina (Russia) Y Sizikova	2	5
(France) M Arcangioli (France) S Reix	6	7
3	(Australia) N Bains (United States) F Di Lorenzo	4	6	[10]
2	(Netherlands) Q Lemoine (Netherlands) E Wacanno	6	4	[7]

Final
(France) M Arcangioli (France) S Reix	4	6	[9]
3	(Australia) N Bains (United States) F Di Lorenzo	6	1	[11]
