= 2017 Engie Open Saint-Gaudens Occitanie – Doubles =

Doubles
- 2017 Engie Open Saint-Gaudens Occitanie

Final
- Champion: (Chinese Taipei) Chang Kai-chen (China) Han Xinyun
- Runner-up: (Paraguay) Montserrat González (Spain) Sílvia Soler Espinosa
- Score: 7–5, 6–1

Events
Singles	Doubles
← 2016 ·	Open Saint-Gaudens Occitanie	· 2018 →

Demi Schuurs and Renata Voráčová were the defending champions, but both players chose not to participate.

Chang Kai-chen and Han Xinyun won the title after defeating Montserrat González and Sílvia Soler Espinosa 7–5, 6–1 in the final.

== Seeds ==
1. (United States) Jamie Loeb / (Turkey) İpek Soylu (quarterfinals)
2. (Chinese Taipei) Chang Kai-chen / (China) Han Xinyun (champions)
3. (Greece) Valentini Grammatikopoulou / (Belarus) Vera Lapko (quarterfinals)
4. (Netherlands) Quirine Lemoine / (Netherlands) Eva Wacanno (semifinals)

== Draw ==
=== Key ===
- Q = Qualifier
- WC = Wild card
- LL = Lucky loser
- Alt = Alternate
- SE = Special exempt
- PR = Protected ranking
- ITF = ITF entry
- JE = Junior exempt
- w/o = Walkover
- r = Retired
- d = Defaulted
- SR = Special ranking

First round
(Paraguay) M González (Spain) S Soler Espinosa	5	7^{7}	[10]
(United States) J Elie (United States) S Vickery	7	6^{3}	[6]
(France) T Andrianjafitrimo (France) A Hesse	6	4	[6]
(Hungary) D Gálfi (Russia) A Kalinskaya	1	6	[10]
(United Kingdom) E Silva (France) L Tholey	6	3	[10]
(Bosnia and Herzegovina) A Husarić (Slovenia) D Jakupović	2	6	[8]
(United Kingdom) T Moore (Switzerland) C Perrin	3	4
4	(Netherlands) Q Lemoine (Netherlands) E Wacanno	6	6
(France) V Muntean (France) J Ponchet	6	4	[10]
(France) M Georges (France) J Suvrijn	2	6	[5]

Quarterfinals
1	(United States) J Loeb (Turkey) İ Soylu	2	0
(Paraguay) M González (Spain) S Soler Espinosa	6	6
3	(Greece) V Grammatikopoulou (Belarus) V Lapko	3	0
(Hungary) D Gálfi (Russia) A Kalinskaya	6	6
(United Kingdom) E Silva (France) L Tholey	4	5
4	(Netherlands) Q Lemoine (Netherlands) E Wacanno	6	7
(France) V Muntean (France) J Ponchet	2	3
2	(Chinese Taipei) K-c Chang (China) X Han	6	6

Semifinals
(Paraguay) M González (Spain) S Soler Espinosa	7^{8}	0	[11]
(Hungary) D Gálfi (Russia) A Kalinskaya	6^{6}	6	[9]
4	(Netherlands) Q Lemoine (Netherlands) E Wacanno	4	6	[10]
2	(Chinese Taipei) K-c Chang (China) X Han	6	2	[12]

Final
(Paraguay) M González (Spain) S Soler Espinosa	5	1
2	(Chinese Taipei) K-c Chang (China) X Han	7	6
