= 2017 Engie Open Saint-Gaudens Occitanie – Singles =

Singles
- 2017 Engie Open Saint-Gaudens Occitanie

Final
- Champion: (Netherlands) Richèl Hogenkamp
- Runner-up: (United States) Kristie Ahn
- Score: 6–2, 6–4

Events
Singles	Doubles
← 2016 ·	Open Saint-Gaudens Occitanie	· 2018 →

Irina Khromacheva was the defending champion, but retired in the quarterfinals against Valentini Grammatikopoulou.

Richèl Hogenkamp won the title, defeating Kristie Ahn in the final, 6–2, 6–4.

== Seeds ==
1. (Russia) Irina Khromacheva (quarterfinals, retired)
2. (Chinese Taipei) Hsieh Su-wei (quarterfinals)
3. (Romania) Ana Bogdan (second round)
4. (Chinese Taipei) Chang Kai-chen (first round)
5. (China) Han Xinyun (first round)
6. (Netherlands) Richèl Hogenkamp (champion)
7. (Brazil) Beatriz Haddad Maia (withdrew)
8. (Belarus) Aryna Sabalenka (quarterfinals)
9. (Slovenia) Dalila Jakupović (second round)

== Draw ==
=== Key ===
- Q = Qualifier
- WC = Wild card
- LL = Lucky loser
- Alt = Alternate
- SE = Special exempt
- PR = Protected ranking
- ITF = ITF entry
- JE = Junior exempt
- w/o = Walkover
- r = Retired
- d = Defaulted
- SR = Special ranking

=== Finals ===
Semifinals
(Greece) Valentini Grammatikopoulou	4	3
6	(Netherlands) Richèl Hogenkamp	6	6
(United States) Kristie Ahn	7	6
(Australia) Destanee Aiava	5	4

Final
6	(Netherlands) Richèl Hogenkamp	6	6
(United States) Kristie Ahn	2	4

=== Top half ===
First round
1	(Russia) I Khromacheva	6	7^{7}
JE	(Switzerland) R Masarova	4	6^{2}
WC	(France) A Albié	4	7^{7}	2
(Russia) A Kalinskaya	6	6^{5}	6
Q	(France) A Hesse	6^{3}	5
(Greece) V Grammatikopoulou	7^{7}	7
(Turkey) İ Soylu	6	6
5	(China) X Han	4	4
4	(Chinese Taipei) K-c Chang	2	1
(Spain) S Soler Espinosa	6	6
Q	(Brazil) T Pereira	3	7	7
(United States) S Vickery	6	5	5
(United States) J Loeb	6	7
(Netherlands) Q Lemoine	3	5
LL	(Australia) S Sanders	3	6	4
6	(Netherlands) R Hogenkamp	6	4	6

Second round
1	(Russia) I Khromacheva	6	2	7^{7}
(Russia) A Kalinskaya	2	6	6^{0}
(Greece) V Grammatikopoulou	6	6
(Turkey) İ Soylu	3	3
(Spain) S Soler Espinosa	6	6
Q	(Brazil) T Pereira	2	4
(United States) J Loeb	2	2
6	(Netherlands) R Hogenkamp	6	6

Quarterfinals
1	(Russia) I Khromacheva	1	2^{r}
(Greece) V Grammatikopoulou	6	2
(Spain) S Soler Espinosa	3	1
6	(Netherlands) R Hogenkamp	6	6

Semifinals
(Greece) V Grammatikopoulou	4	3
6	(Netherlands) R Hogenkamp	6	6

=== Bottom half ===
First round
8	(Belarus) A Sabalenka	6	7^{7}
(Turkey) Ç Büyükakçay	0	6^{1}
WC	(France) T Andrianjafitrimo	6	6
(United Kingdom) T Moore	3	2
WC	(United Kingdom) E Silva	5	3
(United States) K Ahn	7	6
(Paraguay) M González	1	6	3
3	(Romania) A Bogdan	6	2	6
9	(Slovenia) D Jakupović	7	6
Q	(Russia) A Panova	5	3
(Australia) D Aiava	7^{8}	6
WC	(France) V Muntean	6^{6}	2
(Bulgaria) E Kostova	4	2
(Hungary) D Gálfi	6	6
Q	(France) J Ponchet	2	2
2	(Chinese Taipei) S-w Hsieh	6	6

Second round
8	(Belarus) A Sabalenka	6	6
WC	(France) T Andrianjafitrimo	2	3
(United States) K Ahn	6	6^{6}	7^{7}
3	(Romania) A Bogdan	1	7^{8}	6^{4}
9	(Slovenia) D Jakupović	4	7^{7}	6^{1}
(Australia) D Aiava	6	6^{4}	7^{7}
(Hungary) D Gálfi	2	7	3
2	(Chinese Taipei) S-w Hsieh	6	5	6

Quarterfinals
8	(Belarus) A Sabalenka	6	4	5
(United States) K Ahn	3	6	7
(Australia) D Aiava	6	7
2	(Chinese Taipei) S-w Hsieh	3	5

Semifinals
(United States) K Ahn	7	6
(Australia) D Aiava	5	4
