= 2022 Edge Open Saint-Gaudens Occitanie – Singles =

Singles
- 2022 Edge Open Saint-Gaudens Occitanie

Final
- Champion: (Switzerland) Ylena In-Albon
- Runner-up: (Brazil) Carolina Alves
- Score: 4–6, 6–4, 6–3

Events
Singles	Doubles
← 2021 ·	Open Saint-Gaudens Occitanie	· 2023 →

Clara Burel was the defending champion but chose to participate at the 2022 Karlsruhe Open instead.

Ylena In-Albon won the title, defeating Carolina Alves in the final, 4–6, 6–4, 6–3.

== Seeds ==
1. (Switzerland) Ylena In-Albon (champion)
2. (China) Yuan Yue (first round, retired)
3. (Ukraine) Daria Snigur (semifinals)
4. (Australia) Astra Sharma (quarterfinals, withdrew)
5. Anastasia Tikhonova (first round)
6. (Greece) Valentini Grammatikopoulou (first round)
7. (Japan) Nao Hibino (first round)
8. (Switzerland) Simona Waltert (semifinals)

== Draw ==
=== Key ===
- Q = Qualifier
- WC = Wild card
- LL = Lucky loser
- Alt = Alternate
- SE = Special exempt
- PR = Protected ranking
- ITF = ITF entry
- JE = Junior exempt
- w/o = Walkover
- r = Retired
- d = Defaulted
- SR = Special ranking

=== Finals ===
Semifinals
1	(Switzerland) Ylena In-Albon	7	6
3	(Ukraine) Daria Snigur	5	1
8	(Switzerland) Simona Waltert	5	4
(Brazil) Carolina Alves	7	6

Final
1	(Switzerland) Ylena In-Albon	4	6	6
(Brazil) Carolina Alves	6	4	3

=== Top half ===
First round
1	(Switzerland) Y In-Albon	7^{7}	3	6
(Croatia) J Fett	6^{4}	6	3
(Australia) J Fourlis	7	6
N Vikhlyantseva	5	3
(United States) H Chang	2	6	1
(France) C Monnet	6	4	6
Q	(Burundi) S Nahimana	6	6
6	(Greece) V Grammatikopoulou	4	4
3	(Ukraine) D Snigur	6	6
WC	(France) M Noël	2	2
Q	(Romania) IL Roșca	6	6
LL	(Bulgaria) J Stamatova	0	0
Q	(France) J Belgraver	1	2
WC	K Dmitruk	6	6
Y Hatouka	7^{7}	5	6
5	A Tikhonova	6^{4}	7	4

Second round
1	(Switzerland) Y In-Albon	6	6
(Australia) J Fourlis	4	3
(France) C Monnet	6	6
Q	(Burundi) S Nahimana	1	2
3	(Ukraine) D Snigur	6	7^{7}
Q	(Romania) IL Roșca	4	6^{4}
WC	K Dmitruk	5	1
Y Hatouka	7	6

Quarterfinals
1	(Switzerland) Y In-Albon	6	6
(France) C Monnet	4	4
3	(Ukraine) D Snigur	7^{7}	6
Y Hatouka	6^{3}	2

Semifinals
1	(Switzerland) Y In-Albon	7	6
3	(Ukraine) D Snigur	5	1

=== Bottom half ===
First round
8	(Switzerland) S Waltert	6	6
Q	(United States) S Sewing	3	2
(Chile) D Seguel	6	6
Q	(Japan) N Hanatani	1	2
Q	(France) É Dartron	1	1
WC	(France) M Yerolymos	6	6
WC	(France) A Ramé	3	4
4	(Australia) A Sharma	6	6
7	(Japan) N Hibino	2	4
(Brazil) C Alves	6	6
(United Kingdom) J Burrage	6^{0}	7	4
(Mexico) F Contreras	7^{7}	5	6
Q	(France) S Cakarevic	3	5
Q	(Switzerland) L Sun	6	7
(Japan) Y Naito	6	1
2	(China) Y Yuan	1	0^{r}

Second round
8	(Switzerland) S Waltert	6	6
(Chile) D Seguel	2	2
WC	(France) M Yerolymos	4	4
4	(Australia) A Sharma	6	6
(Brazil) C Alves	6	6
(Mexico) F Contreras	4	2
Q	(Switzerland) L Sun	5	1
(Japan) Y Naito	7	6

Quarterfinals
8	(Switzerland) S Waltert	w/o
4	(Australia) A Sharma
(Brazil) C Alves	6	3
(Japan) Y Naito	4	1^{r}

Semifinals
8	(Switzerland) S Waltert	5	4
(Brazil) C Alves	7	6
