= 2011 Open International Féminin Midi-Pyrénées Saint-Gaudens Comminges – Doubles =

Doubles
- 2011 Open International Féminin Midi-Pyrénées Saint-Gaudens Comminges

Final
- Champions: (France) Caroline Garcia (France) Aurélie Védy
- Runners-up: (Russia) Anastasia Pivovarova (Ukraine) Olga Savchuk
- Score: 6–3, 6–3

Events
Singles	Doubles
← 2010 ·	Open International Féminin Midi-Pyrénées Saint-Gaudens Comminges	· 2012 →

Claire Feuerstein and Stéphanie Foretz Gacon were the defending champions, but Foretz Gacon chose not to participate, Feuerstein partnered up with Iryna Brémond but lost in the first round to Caroline Garcia and Aurélie Védy.
Caroline Garcia and Aurélie Védy defeated Anastasia Pivovarova and Olga Savchuk in the final 6–3, 6–3.

== Seeds ==
1. (Russia) Alexandra Panova / (Netherlands) Arantxa Rus (semifinals)
2. (Latvia) Līga Dekmeijere / (Russia) Valeria Savinykh (quarterfinals)
3. (China) Liu Wanting / (China) Lu Jingjing (first round)
4. (France) Iryna Brémond / (France) Claire Feuerstein (first round)

== Draw ==
=== Key ===
- Q = Qualifier
- WC = Wild card
- LL = Lucky loser
- Alt = Alternate
- SE = Special exempt
- PR = Protected ranking
- ITF = ITF entry
- JE = Junior exempt
- w/o = Walkover
- r = Retired
- d = Defaulted
- SR = Special ranking

=== Draw ===
First round
(France) E Lechemia (France) I Ramialison	7	0	[1]
(France) A Lim (Argentina) P Ormaechea	6^{5}	6	[10]
4	(France) I Brémond (France) C Feuerstein	4	6	[5]
(France) C Garcia (France) A Védy	6	4	[10]
(France) S Beltrame (France) C de Gubernatis	6	7
(United States) G Brodsky (Switzerland) C Perrin	1	5
(Greece) I Georgatou (Israel) J Glushko	6	4	[11]
(United States) J Hampton (China) X Han	4	6	[9]
(Japan) M Doi (China) S Zhang	6	3	[11]
3	(China) W Liu (China) J Lu	0	6	[9]
(Russia) A Pivovarova (Ukraine) O Savchuk	6	6
(Spain) S Solsona-Carcasona (Hong Kong) L Zhang	2	1
(France) M Dupuy (France) M Vigne	2	1
2	(Latvia) L Dekmeijere (Russia) V Savinykh	6	6

Quarterfinals
1	(Russia) A Panova (Netherlands) A Rus	6	6
(France) A Lim (Argentina) P Ormaechea	1	2
(France) C Garcia (France) A Védy	6	6
(France) S Beltrame (France) C de Gubernatis	2	3
(Greece) I Georgatou (Israel) J Glushko	4	4
(Japan) M Doi (China) S Zhang	6	6
(Russia) A Pivovarova (Ukraine) O Savchuk	1	6	[10]
2	(Latvia) L Dekmeijere (Russia) V Savinykh	6	1	[5]

Semifinals
1	(Russia) A Panova (Netherlands) A Rus	4	2
(France) C Garcia (France) A Védy	6	6
(Japan) M Doi (China) S Zhang	5	6^{1}
(Russia) A Pivovarova (Ukraine) O Savchuk	7	7

Final
(France) C Garcia (France) A Védy	6	6
(Russia) A Pivovarova (Ukraine) O Savchuk	3	3
