= 2019 Engie Open Saint-Gaudens Occitanie – Doubles =

Women's tennis event

Doubles
- 2019 Engie Open Saint-Gaudens Occitanie

Final
- Champions: (Italy) Martina Di Giuseppe (Italy) Giulia Gatto-Monticone
- Runners-up: (Russia) Anna Kalinskaya (Russia) Sofya Lansere
- Score: 6–1, 6–1

Events
| Singles | Doubles |
| ← 2018 · | Open Saint-Gaudens Occitanie | · 2021 → |

Naiktha Bains and Francesca Di Lorenzo were the defending champions, but both players chose not to participate.

Martina Di Giuseppe and Giulia Gatto-Monticone won the title, defeating Anna Kalinskaya and Sofya Lansere in the final, 6–1, 6–1.

== Seeds ==
1. (United Kingdom) Harriet Dart / (Montenegro) Danka Kovinić (quarterfinals)
2. (Kazakhstan) Anna Danilina / (India) Prarthana Thombare (semifinals)
3. (Russia) Valentina Ivakhnenko / (Cyprus) Raluca Șerban (quarterfinals)
4. (Italy) Camilla Rosatello / (United Kingdom) Eden Silva (quarterfinals)

== Draw ==
=== Key ===
- Q = Qualifier
- WC = Wild card
- LL = Lucky loser
- Alt = Alternate
- SE = Special exempt
- PR = Protected ranking
- ITF = ITF entry
- JE = Junior exempt
- w/o = Walkover
- r = Retired
- d = Defaulted
- SR = Special ranking

=== Draw ===
First round
(Italy) M Di Giuseppe (Italy) G Gatto-Monticone | 6 | 7
(United States) C Gauff (Venezuela) A Uzcátegui | 1 | 5
3 | (Russia) V Ivakhnenko (Cyprus) R Șerban | w/o
(Austria) B Haas (Argentina) P Ormaechea
(France) L Bencheikh (France) S Cakarevic | 2 | 2
(France) M Arcangioli (France) S Reix | 6 | 6
(Russia) A Kalinskaya (Russia) S Lansere | 6 | 6
(France) T Andrianjafitrimo (France) H Tan | 4 | 2
(Argentina) T Búa (South Africa) W Mdlulwa | 2 | 1
4 | (Italy) C Rosatello (United Kingdom) E Silva | 6 | 6
(France) E Lechemia (France) M Partaud | 6 | 6
(France) A Hesse (France) J Ponchet | 3 | 4
(Ukraine) V Strakhova (Russia) A Ureke | 3 | 1
2 | (Kazakhstan) A Danilina (India) P Thombare | 6 | 6

Quarterfinals
1 | (United Kingdom) H Dart (Montenegro) D Kovinić | 6 | 3 | [9]
(Italy) M Di Giuseppe (Italy) G Gatto-Monticone | 3 | 6 | [11]
3 | (Russia) V Ivakhnenko (Cyprus) R Șerban | 1 | 1
(France) M Arcangioli (France) S Reix | 6 | 6
(Russia) A Kalinskaya (Russia) S Lansere | 6 | 6
4 | (Italy) C Rosatello (United Kingdom) E Silva | 3 | 1
(France) E Lechemia (France) M Partaud | 4 | 6^{4}
2 | (Kazakhstan) A Danilina (India) P Thombare | 6 | 7^{7}

Semifinals
(Italy) M Di Giuseppe (Italy) G Gatto-Monticone | 3 | 6 | [10]
(France) M Arcangioli (France) S Reix | 6 | 4 | [3]
(Russia) A Kalinskaya (Russia) S Lansere | 3 | 6 | [10]
2 | (Kazakhstan) A Danilina (India) P Thombare | 6 | 3 | [4]

Final
(Italy) M Di Giuseppe (Italy) G Gatto-Monticone | 6 | 6
(Russia) A Kalinskaya (Russia) S Lansere | 1 | 1
