= 2022 Edge Open Saint-Gaudens Occitanie – Doubles =

Doubles
- 2022 Edge Open Saint-Gaudens Occitanie

Final
- Champions: (Mexico) Fernanda Contreras (Switzerland) Lulu Sun
- Runners-up: (Greece) Valentini Grammatikopoulou; Anastasia Tikhonova
- Score: 7–5, 6–2

Events
Singles	Doubles
← 2021 ·	Open Saint-Gaudens Occitanie	· 2023 →

Anna Bondár and Lara Salden were the defending champions but chose not to participate.

Fernanda Contreras and Lulu Sun won the title, defeating Valentini Grammatikopoulou and Anastasia Tikhonova in the final, 7–5, 6–2.

== Seeds ==
1. (Greece) Valentini Grammatikopoulou / Anastasia Tikhonova (final)
2. (Hungary) Adrienn Nagy / (India) Prarthana Thombare (semifinals)
3. (Mexico) Fernanda Contreras / (Switzerland) Lulu Sun (champions)
4. (Colombia) María Herazo González / (Colombia) María Paulina Pérez (quarterfinals)

== Draw ==
=== Key ===
- Q = Qualifier
- WC = Wild card
- LL = Lucky loser
- Alt = Alternate
- SE = Special exempt
- PR = Protected ranking
- ITF = ITF entry
- JE = Junior exempt
- w/o = Walkover
- r = Retired
- d = Defaulted
- SR = Special ranking

=== Draw ===
First round
(United Kingdom) S Anane (Malta) E Genovese	2	6	[6]
(France) J Belgraver (France) Y Mansouri	6	2	[10]
Y Hatouka (Romania) IL Roșca	6	6
(France) TS Rakotomanga Rajaonah (Bulgaria) J Stamatova	3	2
(France) A Albié (Belgium) M Kempen	6	7^{7}
(United Kingdom) J Burrage (United States) S Sewing	2	6^{5}
(Japan) R Saigo (Japan) Y Saigo	5	6	[6]
(France) É Dartron (France) M Szostak	7	4	[10]

Quarterfinals
1	(Greece) V Grammatikopoulou; A Tikhonova	6	6
(France) J Belgraver (France) Y Mansouri	4	4
4	(Colombia) M Herazo González (Colombia) MP Pérez	3	2
Y Hatouka (Romania) IL Roșca	6	6
(France) A Albié (Belgium) M Kempen	6	6^{6}	[12]
3	(Mexico) F Contreras (Switzerland) L Sun	3	7^{8}	[14]
(France) É Dartron (France) M Szostak	4	2
2	(Hungary) A Nagy (India) P Thombare	6	6

Semifinals
1	(Greece) V Grammatikopoulou; A Tikhonova	6	6
Y Hatouka (Romania) IL Roșca	2	3
3	(Mexico) F Contreras (Switzerland) L Sun	6^{2}	6	[10]
2	(Hungary) A Nagy (India) P Thombare	7^{7}	4	[4]

Final
1	(Greece) V Grammatikopoulou; A Tikhonova	5	2
3	(Mexico) F Contreras (Switzerland) L Sun	7	6
