= 2011 Open International Féminin Midi-Pyrénées Saint-Gaudens Comminges – Singles =

Singles
- 2011 Open International Féminin Midi-Pyrénées Saint-Gaudens Comminges

Final
- Champions: (Russia) Anastasia Pivovarova
- Runners-up: (Netherlands) Arantxa Rus
- Score: 7–6^{(7–4)}, 6–7^{(3–7)}, 6–2

Events
| Singles | Doubles |
| ← 2010 · | Open International Féminin Midi-Pyrénées Saint-Gaudens Comminges | · 2012 → |

Kaia Kanepi was the defending champion but chose not to compete.
Anastasia Pivovarova defeated Arantxa Rus in the final 7–6^{(7–4)}, 6–7^{(3–7)}, 6–2.

== Seeds ==
1. (China) Zhang Shuai (first round)
2. (Georgia (country)) Anna Tatishvili (quarterfinals)
3. (Netherlands) Arantxa Rus (final)
4. (Russia) Anastasia Pivovarova (champion)
5. (Russia) Vesna Dolonts (semifinals, retired)
6. (France) Pauline Parmentier (quarterfinals)
7. (United States) Jamie Hampton (first round)
8. (China) Han Xinyun (first round, retired)

== Draw ==
=== Key ===
- Q = Qualifier
- WC = Wild card
- LL = Lucky loser
- Alt = Alternate
- SE = Special exempt
- PR = Protected ranking
- ITF = ITF entry
- JE = Junior exempt
- w/o = Walkover
- r = Retired
- d = Defaulted
- SR = Special ranking

=== Finals ===
Semifinals
(Russia) Valeria Savinykh | 5 | 5
3 | (Netherlands) Arantxa Rus | 7 | 7
4 | (Russia) Anastasia Pivovarova | 2 | 6 | 2
5 | (Russia) Vesna Dolonts | 6 | 4 | 0^{r}

Final
3 | (Netherlands) Arantxa Rus | 6^{4} | 7 | 2
4 | (Russia) Anastasia Pivovarova | 7 | 6^{3} | 6

=== Top half ===
First round
1 | (China) S Zhang | 6 | 3 | 4
SE | (Argentina) P Ormaechea | 3 | 6 | 6
(Russia) V Savinykh | 7 | 4 | 6
Q | (France) J Coin | 6^{4} | 6 | 4
(Greece) I Georgatou | 6 | 7
(Belarus) D Kustova | 1 | 6^{7}
Q | (United States) G Brodsky | 6 | 3 | 1
8 | (China) X Han | 1 | 6 | 0^{r}
3 | (Netherlands) A Rus | 6 | 6
WC | (France) C de Gubernatis | 1 | 1
Q | (United Kingdom) T Moore | 2 | 6 | 3
WC | (France) S Beltrame | 6 | 1 | 6
JE | (Ukraine) E Svitolina | 6 | 4 | 6
WC | (France) C Feuerstein | 2 | 6 | 3
(France) I Brémond | 6 | 6
7 | (United States) J Hampton | 4 | 3

Second round
SE | (Argentina) P Ormaechea | 3 | 7 | 2
(Russia) V Savinykh | 6 | 5 | 6
(Greece) I Georgatou | 5 | 6 | 6
Q | (United States) G Brodsky | 7 | 1 | 1
3 | (Netherlands) A Rus | 6 | 6
WC | (France) S Beltrame | 3 | 3
JE | (Ukraine) E Svitolina | 6 | 6
(France) I Brémond | 3 | 4

Quarterfinals
(Russia) V Savinykh | 6 | 6
(Greece) I Georgatou | 4 | 1
3 | (Netherlands) A Rus | 6 | 4 | 6
JE | (Ukraine) E Svitolina | 4 | 6 | 3

Semifinals
(Russia) V Savinykh | 5 | 5
3 | (Netherlands) A Rus | 7 | 7

=== Bottom half ===
First round
6 | (France) P Parmentier | 2 | 6 | 6
(Hong Kong) L Zhang | 6 | 1 | 3
WC | (France) K Mladenovic | 6^{2} | 3
(Russia) A Panova | 7 | 6
(Japan) M Doi | 6^{4} | 6 | 6
(Israel) J Glushko | 7 | 4 | 0
(France) C Garcia | 6^{3} | 3
4 | (Russia) A Pivovarova | 7 | 6
5 | (Russia) V Dolonts | 6 | 6
(China) J Lu | 4 | 4
(Slovenia) M Zec Peškirič | 6 | 7
Q | (Switzerland) C Perrin | 1 | 5
(Ukraine) O Savchuk | 6 | 6
(Spain) B García Vidagany | 2 | 1
(France) A Laurendon | 2 | 3
2 | (Georgia (country)) A Tatishvili | 6 | 6

Second round
6 | (France) P Parmentier | 3 | 6 | 7
(Russia) A Panova | 6 | 4 | 5
(Japan) M Doi | 4 | 2
4 | (Russia) A Pivovarova | 6 | 6
5 | (Russia) V Dolonts | 6 | 7
(Slovenia) M Zec Peškirič | 4 | 6^{2}
(Ukraine) O Savchuk | 4 | 6 | 5
2 | (Georgia (country)) A Tatishvili | 6 | 2 | 7

Quarterfinals
6 | (France) P Parmentier | 5 | 5
4 | (Russia) A Pivovarova | 7 | 7
5 | (Russia) V Dolonts | 6 | 6
2 | (Georgia (country)) A Tatishvili | 2 | 1

Semifinals
4 | (Russia) A Pivovarova | 2 | 6 | 2
5 | (Russia) V Dolonts | 6 | 4 | 0^{r}
