= Martina Di Giuseppe =

Italian tennis player

Martina di Giuseppe
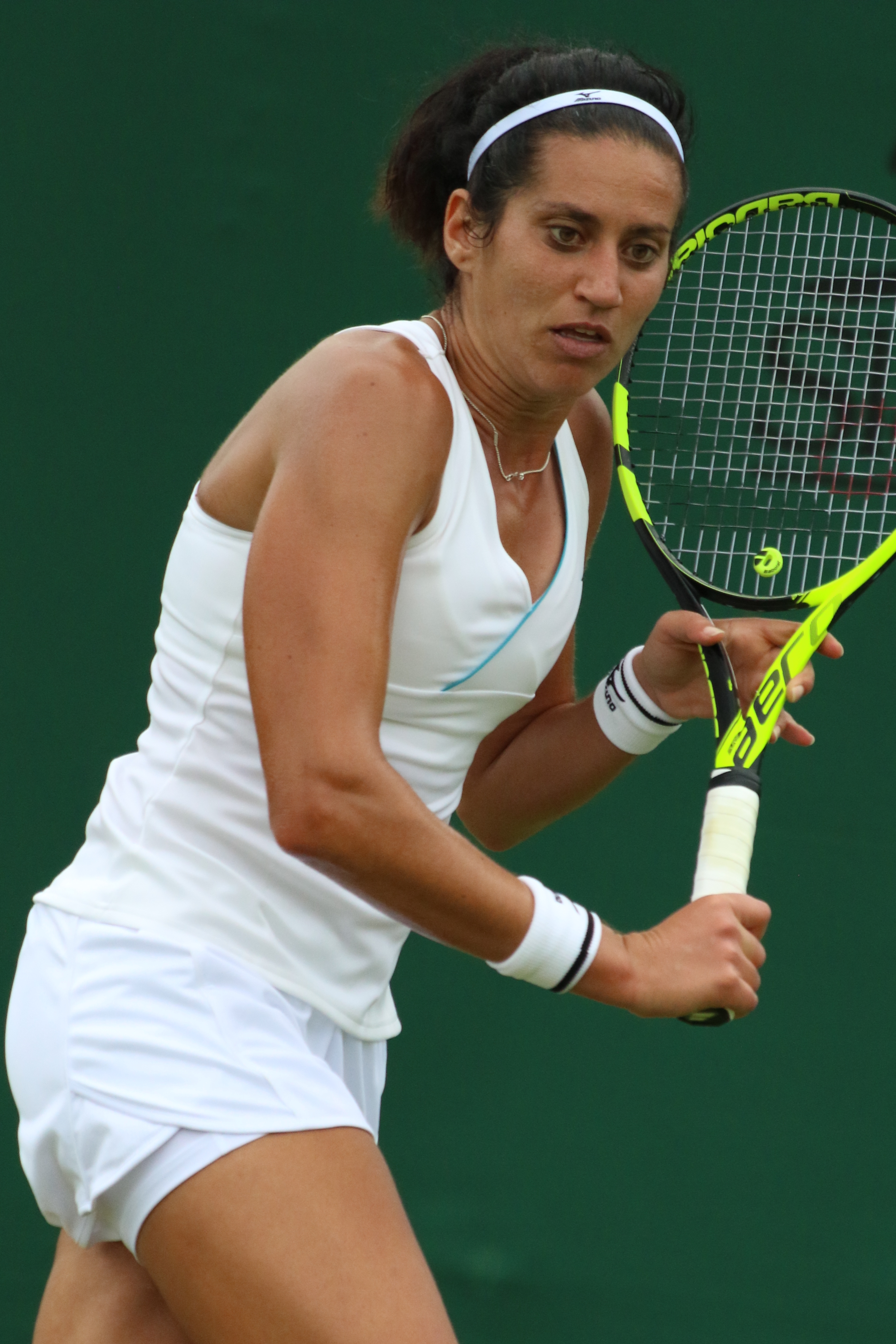
- Di Giuseppe at the 2019 Wimbledon Championships
- Country (sports): Italy
- Born: 10 February 1991 (age 34)
- Plays: Right (one-handed backhand)
- Prize money: US$ 355,603

Singles
- Career record: 360–321
- Career titles: 7 ITF
- Highest ranking: No. 149 (22 July 2019)
- Current ranking: No. 967 (11 September 2023)

Grand Slam singles results
- Australian Open: Q2 (2020)
- French Open: Q2 (2020, 2021)
- Wimbledon: Q2 (2019)
- US Open: Q1 (2018, 2019)

Doubles
- Career record: 90–80
- Career titles: 6 ITF
- Highest ranking: No. 338 (22 July 2019)
- Last updated on: 11 September 2023.

Martina di Giuseppe (born 10 February 1991) is an Italian tennis player.

Di Giuseppe achieved her career-high singles ranking of world No. 149 on 22 July 2019, after having made the semifinals at the Bucharest Open. On the same date, she peaked at No. 338 in the WTA doubles rankings.

Di Giuseppe has won seven singles titles and six doubles titles on tournaments of the ITF Women's Circuit.

== Grand Slam singles performance timeline ==
Key
W	F	SF	QF	#R	RR	Q#	P#	DNQ	A	Z#	PO	G	S	B	NMS	NTI	P	NH

(W) winner; (F) finalist; (SF) semifinalist; (QF) quarterfinalist; (#R) rounds 4, 3, 2, 1; (RR) round-robin stage; (Q#) qualification round; (P#) preliminary round; (DNQ) did not qualify; (A) absent; (Z#) Davis/Fed Cup Zonal Group (with number indication) or (PO) play-off; (G) gold, (S) silver or (B) bronze Olympic/Paralympic medal; (NMS) not a Masters tournament; (NTI) not a Tier I tournament; (P) postponed; (NH) not held; (SR) strike rate (events won / competed); (W–L) win–loss record.
To avoid confusion and double counting, these charts are updated at the conclusion of a tournament or when the player's participation has ended.

== ITF Circuit finals ==
=== Singles: 15 (7 titles, 8 runner–ups) ===
Legend $100,000 tournaments $80,000 tournaments $60,000 tournaments $25,000 tournaments $15,000 tournaments $10,000 tournaments	Finals by surface Hard (0–0) Clay (7–8) Grass (0–0) Carpet (0–0)

Result	W–L	Date	Tournament	Tier	Surface	Opponent	Score
Win	1–0	May 2009	ITF Caserta, Italy	10,000	Clay	(Bulgaria) Martina Gledacheva	7–6^{(9–7)}, 6–1
Loss	1–1	Jun 2009	ITF Turin, Italy	10,000	Clay	(Italy) Andreea-Roxana Vaideanu	3–6, 4–6
Win	2–1	Nov 2009	ITF Mallorca, Spain	10,000	Clay	(Spain) Laura Pous Tió	6–3, 6–3
Loss	2–2	Feb 2012	ITF Antalya, Turkey	10,000	Clay	(Netherlands) Danielle Harmsen	3–6, 4–6
Loss	2–3	Mar 2012	ITF Antalya, Turkey	10,000	Clay	(Croatia) Ana Savić	2–6, 6–4, 2–6
Win	3–3	Feb 2016	ITF Palma Nova, Spain	10,000	Clay	(Norway) Melanie Stokke	7–6^{(7–5)}, 6–2
Win	4–3	Mar 2016	ITF Le Havre, France	10,000	Clay (i)	(Belgium) Sofie Oyen	6–3, 6–0
Loss	4–4	Feb 2017	ITF Bergamo, Italy	15,000	Clay (i)	(Poland) Iga Świątek	4–6, 6–3, 3–6
Win	5–4	Jul 2017	ITF Lund, Sweden	25,000	Clay	(Hungary) Ágnes Bukta	6–4, 2–6, 6–2
Win	6–4	May 2018	ITF Rome, Italy	25,000	Clay	(Hungary) Fanny Stollár	7–5, 7–6^{(7–4)}
Loss	6–5	Jun 2018	Grado Tennis Cup, Italy	25,000	Clay	(Turkey) Çağla Büyükakçay	2–6, 2–6
Loss	6–6	Jun 2018	ITF Madrid, Spain	25,000	Clay (i)	(France) Amandine Hesse	6–7^{(3–7)}, 6–4, 5–7
Loss	6–7	Jul 2018	ITF Prague Open, Czech Republic	80.000	Clay	(Netherlands) Richèl Hogenkamp	4–6, 2–6
Win	7–7	Oct 2018	ITF Pula, Italy	25,000	Clay	(Brazil) Gabriela Cé	6–4, 6–3
Loss	7–8	Apr 2022	ITF Oeiras, Portugal	25,000	Clay	(Russia) Diana Shnaider	4–6, 2–6

=== Doubles: 14 (6 titles, 8 runner–ups) ===
Legend $100,000 tournaments $80,000 tournaments $60,000 tournaments $25,000 tournaments $10,000 tournaments	Finals by surface Hard (0–0) Clay (6–7) Grass (0–0) Carpet (0–1)

Result	W–L	Date	Tournament	Tier	Surface	Partner	Opponents	Score
Loss	0–1	May 2009	ITF Caserta, Italy	10,000	Clay	(Italy) Andreea-Roxana Vaideanu	(Italy) Stefania Chieppa (Italy) Giulia Gatto-Monticone	1–6, 4–6
Loss	0–2	Nov 2009	ITF Mallorca, Spain	10,000	Clay	(Italy) Federica di Sarra	(Ukraine) Katerina Avdiyenko (Ukraine) Anastasiya Lytovchenko	3–6, 6–7^{(5)}
Win	1–2	Jun 2013	ITF Rome, Italy	10,000	Clay	(Romania) Bianca Hincu	(Italy) Claudia Giovine (Italy) Jasmine Paolini	6–1, 6–3
Win	2–2	Jun 2015	ITF Rome, Italy	10,000	Clay	(Italy) Anna-Giulia Remondina	(Italy) Giulia Carbonaro (Italy) Federica Spazzacampagna	4–6, 6–2, [10–3]
Loss	2–3	Jul 2015	ITF Viserba, Italy	10,000	Clay	(Italy) Giorgia Marchetti	(United Kingdom) Amanda Carreras (Italy) Alice Savoretti	6–3, 3–6, [3–10]
Win	3–3	Oct 2015	ITF Pula, Italy	10,000	Clay	(Italy) Alice Balducci	(Italy) Corinna Dentoni (Italy) Anastasia Grymalska	w/o
Win	4–3	Nov 2015	ITF Pula, Italy	10,000	Clay	(Italy) Anastasia Grymalska	(Italy) Federica Bilardo (Russia) Olesya Pervushina	6–2, 6–4
Win	5–3	Feb 2016	ITF Palma Nova, Spain	10,000	Clay	(Italy) Giorgia Marchetti	(Colombia) Yuliana Lizarazo (Italy) Miriana Tona	6–2, 6–4
Loss	5–4	Jul 2016	ITF Imola, Italy	25,000	Carpet	(Italy) Maria Masini	(Greece) Eleni Daniilidou (Switzerland) Lisa Sabino	6–4, 2–6, [4–10]
Loss	5–5	Aug 2017	Hódmezővásárhely Open, Hungary	25,000	Clay	(Italy) Anna-Giulia Remondina	(Romania) Elena Gabriela Ruse (Netherlands) Eva Wacanno	3–6, 1–6
Loss	5–6	Sep 2017	ITF Pula, Italy	25,000	Clay	(Italy) Martina Caregaro	(Italy) Claudia Giovine (Italy) Anastasia Grymalska	6–3, 5–7, [4–10]
Loss	5–7	Oct 2018	ITF Pula, Italy	25,000	Clay	(Italy) Anna-Giulia Remondina	(Russia) Amina Anshba (Georgia (country)) Sofia Shapatava	6–7^{(5–7)}, 6–2, [6–10]
Loss	5–8	Mar 2019	ITF São Paulo, Brazil	25,000	Clay	(Brazil) Thaisa Grana Pedretti	(Brazil) Paula Cristina Gonçalves (Brazil) Luisa Stefani	7–6^{(7–4)}, 0–6, [8–10]
Win	6–8	May 2019	Open Saint-Gaudens, France	60,000	Clay	(Italy) Giulia Gatto-Monticone	(Russia) Anna Kalinskaya (Russia) Sofya Lansere	6–1, 6–1
