= Saint-Gaudens, Haute-Garonne =

Saint-Gaudens
- Subprefecture and commune
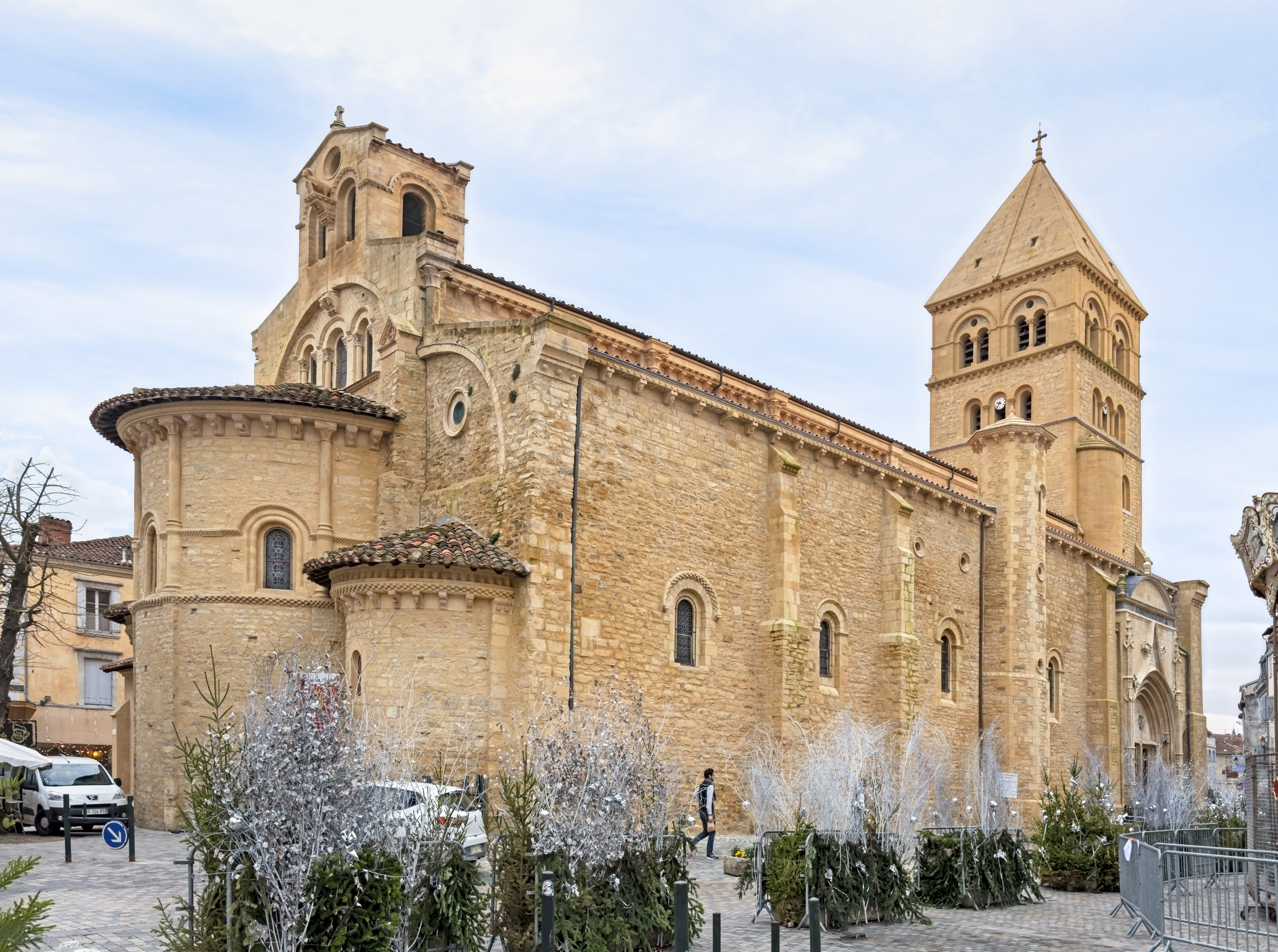
- Collégiale

- Coat of arms
- Location of Saint-Gaudens
- Location within France Location within Occitanie
- Coordinates: 43°06′32″N 0°43′27″E
- Country: France
- Region: Occitania
- Department: Haute-Garonne
- Arrondissement: Saint-Gaudens
- Canton: Saint-Gaudens
- Intercommunality: Cœur et Coteaux du Comminges

Government
  - Mayor (2020–2026): Jean-Yves Duclos
- Area^{1}: 27.35 km^{2} (10.56 sq mi)
- Elevation: 372 m (1,220 ft)
- Highest elevation: 558 m (1,831 ft)
- Lowest elevation: 338 m (1,109 ft)
- Population (2023): 12,139
  - Density: 443.8/km^{2} (1,150/sq mi)
- Time zone: UTC+01:00 (CET)
  - Summer (DST): UTC+02:00 (CEST)
- INSEE/Postal code: 31483 /31800
- ^{1} French Land Register data, which excludes lakes, ponds, glaciers > 1 km^{2} (0.386 sq mi or 247 acres) and river estuaries.

Saint-Gaudens (French pronunciation: [sɛ̃ ɡodɛ̃s]; Occitan: Sent-Gaudenç) is a commune and a sub-prefecture of the Haute-Garonne department in southwestern France.

Saint-Gaudens lies at an altitude of 405 m (1,329 ft) on a ledge overlooking the valley of the Garonne. It faces the Pyrenees and is a natural crossroads for routes between the Atlantic and the Mediterranean and between Toulouse and the Val d'Aran in Catalonia. Saint-Gaudens station has rail connections to Toulouse, Bayonne, Pau and Tarbes.

== History ==
Saint-Gaudens has been inhabited since ancient times (traces of the Iron Age and of Roman occupation) and was originally called Mas-Saint-Pierre, before taking the name of the young shepherd, Gaudens, martyred by the Visigoths at the end of the 5th century for refusing to renounce his faith.

The town later developed around the 11th century Romanesque church. It was granted its city charter in 1202 and became the capital of the Nébouzan area, protected by solid ramparts. As an important regional marketplace, Saint-Gaudens became the economic capital of the Comminges.

In 1569, the town was damaged by Protestant forces under Gabriel de Lorges, Count of Montgomery, and became the seat of the Nébouzan Assembly after coming under the control of the French crown in 1607. The name was changed briefly to "Mont-Unité" during the Revolution and the area later became part of the Haute-Garonne department. In 1974 it absorbed the former commune Lieoux, which was re-established as a separate commune in 2008.

== Population ==
Historical population

Year	Pop.	±% p.a.
1793	4,000	—
1800	4,155	+0.54%
1806	5,054	+3.32%
1821	5,428	+0.48%
1831	6,179	+1.30%
1836	6,020	−0.52%
1841	5,459	−1.94%
1846	5,056	−1.52%
1851	4,692	−1.48%
1856	4,905	+0.89%
1861	4,975	+0.28%
1866	5,166	+0.76%
1872	5,669	+1.56%
1876	5,955	+1.24%
1881	6,312	+1.17%
1886	6,602	+0.90%
1891	7,007	+1.20%
1896	6,651	−1.04%
1901	7,277	+1.82%

Year	Pop.	±% p.a.
1906	7,120	−0.44%
1911	7,127	+0.02%
1921	6,429	−1.03%
1926	6,516	+0.27%
1931	6,392	−0.38%
1936	6,385	−0.02%
1946	7,944	+2.21%
1954	8,023	+0.12%
1962	10,581	+3.52%
1968	11,682	+1.66%
1975	12,148	+0.56%
1982	11,644	−0.60%
1990	11,266	−0.41%
1999	10,845	−0.42%
2007	11,152	+0.35%
2012	11,199	+0.08%
2017	11,517	+0.56%
2023	12,139	+0.88%

Source: EHESS and INSEE (1968-2023)

== Sights ==
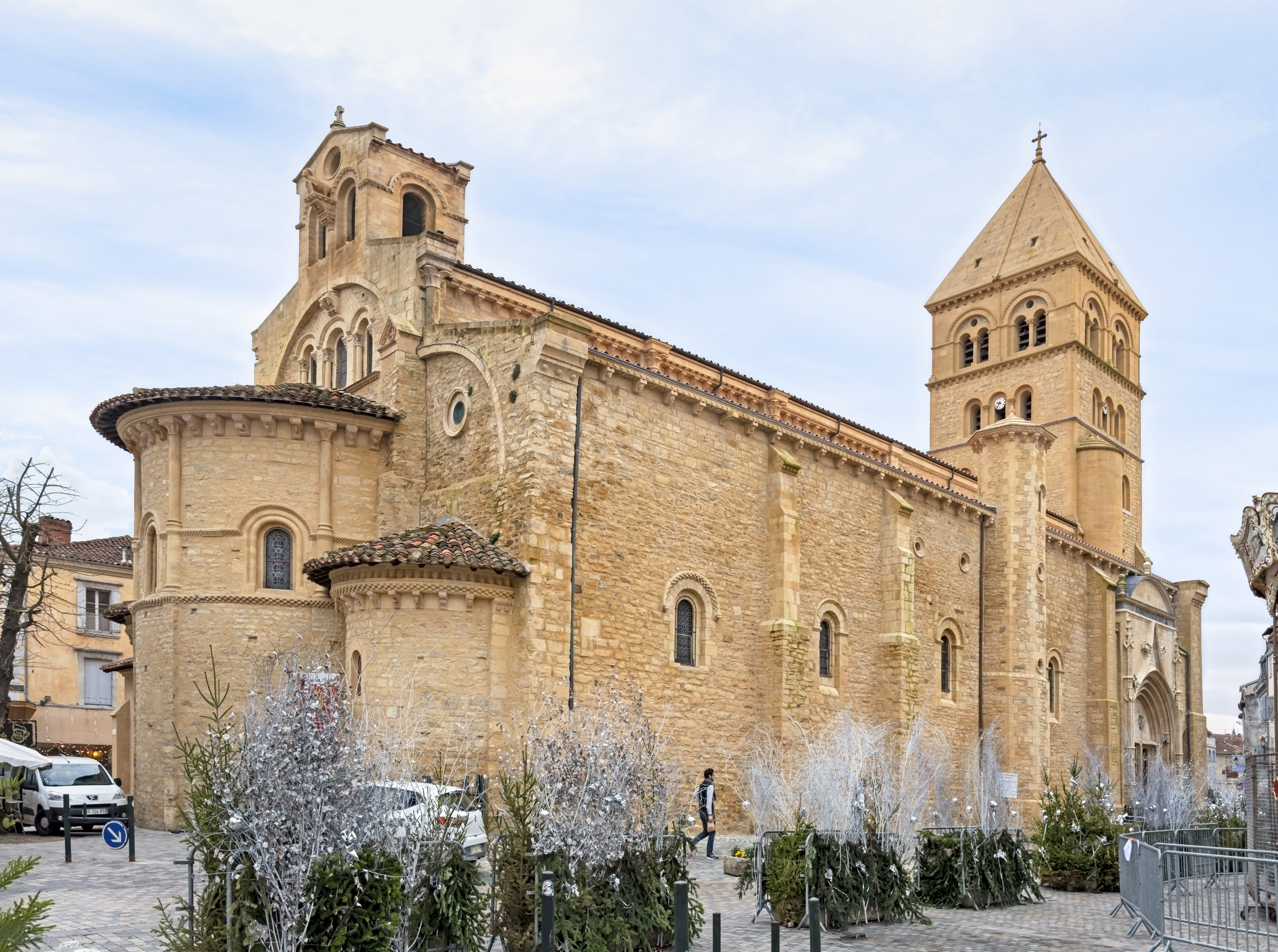
Church of Saint-Pierre-et-Saint-Gaudens.

The Collegiate Church of St. Peter and St. Gaudens, with its cloister and chapter house, this was one of the most important religious buildings in the Comminges. It was home to a college of canons ordinary, a community founded by Bishop Bertrand. The 11th century romanesque church, built on the typical Pyrenean plan as a basilica with a nave and two aisles, stands on the site of an earlier construction. It was extended in the 12th and 13th centuries with the construction of the cloister and chapter house. The lateral north door was added in the 16th century.

Several tall buildings are reminders of the city's medieval period, with plain façades to which balconies were added at the end of the 19th century. Other buildings, including some town houses, date back to the 18th century, and are decorated with stone carvings. Some buildings have façades with pediments, friezes and cornices, mouldings, and gabled dormer windows. On Boulevard Bepmale the façades that face the Sun, with a view of the Pyrenees, have balconies and galleries up to their very top floors.

== Sport ==
St Gaudens has a Rugby League (Rugby XIII) team playing in the French Championship, the Saint-Gaudens Bears.

St Gaudens also hosts a popular rugby union team (Rugby XV) SSGL (Stade Saint-Gaudinois Luchonnais XV).

The Open International Féminin Midi-Pyrénées Saint-Gaudens Comminges, an ITF Women's Circuit tennis tournament, is held in Saint-Gaudens.

The 2014 Tour de France cycle race began stage 17 in Saint Gaudens, with a 124.5 kilometres (77.4 mi) route to Saint-Lary.

== International relations ==
Saint-Gaudens is twinned with:

- Avranches, France
- Barbastro, Spain
- Vielha e Mijaran, Spain

== Notable people ==
- Christophe Avezac (born 1977), footballer
- Yves Giraud-Cabantous (1904–1973), racing driver
- Maelle Millet (born 2004), rhythmic gymnast

== Climate ==
Climate data for Saint-Gaudens (Clarac), elevation 401 m (1,316 ft), (1991−2020 normals, extremes 1994−present)
Month	Jan	Feb	Mar	Apr	May	Jun	Jul	Aug	Sep	Oct	Nov	Dec	Year
Record high °C (°F)	22.8 (73.0)	24.4 (75.9)	26.5 (79.7)	29.0 (84.2)	31.4 (88.5)	37.3 (99.1)	39.3 (102.7)	39.4 (102.9)	34.6 (94.3)	31.7 (89.1)	26.1 (79.0)	23.4 (74.1)	39.4 (102.9)
Mean daily maximum °C (°F)	10.3 (50.5)	11.5 (52.7)	14.6 (58.3)	16.9 (62.4)	20.0 (68.0)	23.7 (74.7)	26.0 (78.8)	26.3 (79.3)	23.4 (74.1)	19.7 (67.5)	13.7 (56.7)	11.1 (52.0)	18.1 (64.6)
Daily mean °C (°F)	5.2 (41.4)	6.0 (42.8)	8.6 (47.5)	11.1 (52.0)	14.5 (58.1)	18.2 (64.8)	20.4 (68.7)	20.4 (68.7)	17.3 (63.1)	13.8 (56.8)	8.4 (47.1)	5.8 (42.4)	12.5 (54.5)
Mean daily minimum °C (°F)	0.1 (32.2)	0.6 (33.1)	2.7 (36.9)	5.3 (41.5)	9.0 (48.2)	12.7 (54.9)	14.7 (58.5)	14.5 (58.1)	11.2 (52.2)	7.9 (46.2)	3.1 (37.6)	0.6 (33.1)	6.9 (44.4)
Record low °C (°F)	−12.3 (9.9)	−11.6 (11.1)	−9.5 (14.9)	−3.5 (25.7)	−0.9 (30.4)	1.7 (35.1)	6.0 (42.8)	4.8 (40.6)	1.3 (34.3)	−3.6 (25.5)	−8.8 (16.2)	−12.5 (9.5)	−12.5 (9.5)
Average precipitation mm (inches)	77.1 (3.04)	59.8 (2.35)	69.1 (2.72)	81.3 (3.20)	91.2 (3.59)	61.0 (2.40)	54.4 (2.14)	49.1 (1.93)	53.5 (2.11)	55.5 (2.19)	86.7 (3.41)	66.2 (2.61)	804.9 (31.69)
Average precipitation days (≥ 1.0 mm)	10.4	9.1	10.3	11.0	11.2	8.0	6.6	7.6	7.7	8.7	11.0	9.7	111.3
Source: Météo-France

== See also ==
- Grand Prix du Comminges
- Sculptor Augustus St. Gaudens
- Communes of the Haute-Garonne department
