= Open Saint-Gaudens Occitanie =

Edge Open Saint-Gaudens Occitanie
- 2024 Open Saint-Gaudens Occitanie

ITF Women's Tour
- Event name: Edge Open Saint-Gaudens Occitanie (2022–); Engie Open Saint-Gaudens Occitanie (2017–21); Open Engie Saint-Gaudens Midi-Pyrénées (–2016)
- Location: Saint-Gaudens, France
- Venue: Tennis Club Saint-Gaudens
- Category: ITF Women's Circuit
- Surface: Clay
- Draw: 32S/32Q/16D
- Prize money: $60,000
- Website: www.openst-gaudens.fr

The Edge Open Saint-Gaudens Occitanie is a tournament for professional female tennis players played on clay courts. The event is classified as a $60,000 ITF Women's Circuit tournament and has been held in Saint-Gaudens, France, since 1997.

== Past finals ==
=== Singles ===
| Year | Champion | Runner-up | Score |
|---|---|---|---|
| 1997 | (Spain) Paula García | (Spain) Rosa María Andrés Rodríguez | 2–6, 6–4, 7–5 |
| 1998 | (France) Doriane Caporusso | (Romania) Mihaela Vulpes | 3–6, 7–5, 6–3 |
| 1999 | (France) Carine Bornu | (France) Anne-Laure Heitz | 2–6, 6–4, 6–1 |
| 2000 | (Ukraine) Elena Tatarkova | (Tunisia) Selima Sfar | 6–4, 6–4 |
| 2001 | (France) Céline Beigbeder | (Ukraine) Julia Vakulenko | 6–4, 6–1 |
| 2002 | (Argentina) Mariana Díaz Oliva | (Slovenia) Maja Matevžič | 6–4, 6–1 |
| 2003 | (Ukraine) Tatiana Perebiynis | (Czech Republic) Renata Voráčová | 6–1, 6–4 |
| 2004 | (Russia) Maria Kirilenko | (France) Stéphanie Foretz | 7–6^{(7–2)}, 6–3 |
| 2005 | (France) Aravane Rezaï | (Germany) Stephanie Gehrlein | 6–4, 2–6, 6–2 |
| 2006 | (Switzerland) Timea Bacsinszky | (Croatia) Ivana Abramovic | 7–5, 6–4 |
| 2007 | (Ukraine) Tatiana Perebiynis | (Czech Republic) Petra Cetkovská | 5–7, 7–5, 7–5 |
| 2008 | (Czech Republic) Petra Cetkovská | (Spain) María José Martínez Sánchez | 6–4, 6–4 |
| 2009 | (Belarus) Anastasiya Yakimova | (Belgium) Yanina Wickmayer | 7–5, 7–6^{(7–0)} |
| 2010 | (Estonia) Kaia Kanepi | (China) Zhang Shuai | 6–2, 7–5 |
| 2011 | (Russia) Anastasia Pivovarova | (Netherlands) Arantxa Rus | 7–6^{(7–4)}, 6–7^{(3–7)}, 6–2 |
| 2012 | (Colombia) Mariana Duque | (France) Claire Feuerstein | 4–6, 6–3, 6–2 |
| 2013 | (Argentina) Paula Ormaechea | (Germany) Dinah Pfizenmaier | 6–3, 3–6, 6–4 |
| 2014 | (Montenegro) Danka Kovinic | (France) Pauline Parmentier | 6–1, 6–2 |
| 2015 | (Spain) María Teresa Torró Flor | (Slovakia) Jana Čepelová | 6–1, 6–0 |
| 2016 | (Russia) Irina Khromacheva | (Greece) Maria Sakkari | 1–6, 7–6^{(7–3)}, 6–1 |
| 2017 | (Netherlands) Richèl Hogenkamp | (United States) Kristie Ahn | 6–2, 6–4 |
| 2018 | (Belarus) Vera Lapko | (Netherlands) Quirine Lemoine | 6–2, 6–4 |
| 2019 | (Russia) Anna Kalinskaya | (Romania) Ana Bogdan | 6–3, 6–4 |
| 2020 | Tournament cancelled due to the COVID-19 pandemic | | |
| 2021 | (France) Clara Burel | (Romania) Alexandra Dulgheru | 6–2, 1–6, 6–2 |
| 2022 | (Switzerland) Ylena In-Albon | (Brazil) Carolina Alves | 4–6, 6–4, 6–3 |
| 2023 | (United States) Robin Montgomery | (France) Alice Robbe | 7–5, 6–4 |
| 2024 | (United States) Claire Liu | (France) Séléna Janicijevic | 6–1, 6–7^{(3–7)}, 6–0 |
| 2025 | (France) Loïs Boisson | Tatiana Prozorova | 7–6^{(7–4)}, 6–0 |
| 2026 | (Spain) Kaitlin Quevedo | (Spain) Andrea Lázaro García | 6–3, 6–2 |

=== Doubles ===
| Year | Champions | Runners-up | Score |
|---|---|---|---|
| 1997 | (Georgia (country)) Irina Kakoulia (Finland) Minna Rautajoki | (France) Sandrine Bouilleau (France) Victoria Courmes-Bendetti | 6–2, 6–2 |
| 1998 | (France) Sylvie Sallaberry (France) Aurélie Védy | (Spain) Paula García (Republic of Ireland) Kelly Liggan | 6–3, 7–6^{(7–5)} |
| 1999 | (Colombia) Giana Gutiérrez (Argentina) Sabrina Valenti | (Australia) Mireille Dittmann (United Kingdom) Nicola Payne | 6–3, 6–2 |
| 2000 | (Russia) Svetlana Krivencheva (Ukraine) Elena Tatarkova | (Hungary) Eszter Molnár (Croatia) Maja Palaveršić | 3–6, 7–5, 6–3 |
| 2001 | (France) Sarah Pitkowski-Malcor (Kazakhstan) Irina Selyutina | (Spain) Lourdes Domínguez Lino (Spain) Gisela Riera | 6–2, 6–3 |
| 2002 | (Slovakia) Ľudmila Cervanová (Slovakia) Stanislava Hrozenská | (Australia) Sarah Stone (Australia) Samantha Stosur | 7–6^{(7–5)}, 6–4 |
| 2003 | (Russia) Eugenia Kulikovskaya (Ukraine) Tatiana Perebiynis | (Belarus) Tatiana Poutchek (Russia) Anastasia Rodionova | 7–6^{(10–8)}, 6–3 |
| 2004 | (Romania) Ruxandra Dragomir Ilie (Romania) Andreea Ehritt-Vanc | (Poland) Marta Domachowska (Argentina) Natalia Gussoni | 2–6, 7–6^{(9–7)}, 6–4 |
| 2005 | (United Kingdom) Claire Curran (South Africa) Natalie Grandin | (Argentina) María José Argeri (Brazil) Letícia Sobral | 6–3, 6–1 |
| 2006 | (Croatia) Ivana Abramovic (Russia) Alla Kudryavtseva | (Argentina) María José Argeri (Brazil) Letícia Sobral | 6–2, 6–0 |
| 2007 | (Argentina) Jorgelina Cravero (Belarus) Darya Kustova | (Uzbekistan) Akgul Amanmuradova (Belarus) Iryna Kuryanovich | 6–1, 6–3 |
| 2008 | (Chinese Taipei) Hsieh Su-wei (Canada) Marie-Ève Pelletier | (South Africa) Chanelle Scheepers (France) Aurélie Védy | 6–4, 6–0 |
| 2009 | (Japan) Rika Fujiwara (South Africa) Chanelle Scheepers | (Japan) Kimiko Date-Krumm (China) Sun Tiantian | 7–5, 6–4 |
| 2010 | (France) Claire Feuerstein (France) Stéphanie Foretz | (Ukraine) Olga Savchuk (Belarus) Anastasiya Yakimova | 6–2, 6–4 |
| 2011 | (France) Caroline Garcia (France) Aurélie Védy | (Russia) Anastasia Pivovarova (Ukraine) Olga Savchuk | 6–3, 6–3 |
| 2012 | (Serbia) Vesna Dolonc (Russia) Irina Khromacheva | (United Kingdom) Naomi Broady (Israel) Julia Glushko | 6–2, 6–0 |
| 2013 | (Israel) Julia Glushko (Argentina) Paula Ormaechea | (Canada) Stéphanie Dubois (Japan) Kurumi Nara | 7–5, 7–6^{(13–11)} |
| 2014 | (Paraguay) Verónica Cepede Royg (Argentina) María Irigoyen | (Canada) Sharon Fichman (United Kingdom) Johanna Konta | 7–5, 6–3 |
| 2015 | (Colombia) Mariana Duque (Israel) Julia Glushko | (Brazil) Beatriz Haddad Maia (United States) Nicole Melichar | 1–6, 7–6^{(7–5)}, [10–4] |
| 2016 | (Netherlands) Demi Schuurs (Czech Republic) Renata Vorácová | (Germany) Nicola Geuer (Switzerland) Viktorija Golubic | 6–1, 6–2 |
| 2017 | (Chinese Taipei) Chang Kai-chen (China) Han Xinyun | (Paraguay) Montserrat González (Spain) Sílvia Soler Espinosa | 7–5, 6–1 |
| 2018 | (Australia) Naiktha Bains (United States) Francesca Di Lorenzo | (France) Manon Arcangioli (France) Shérazad Reix | 6–4, 1–6, [11–9] |
| 2019 | (Italy) Martina Di Giuseppe (Italy) Giulia Gatto-Monticone | (Russia) Anna Kalinskaya (Russia) Sofya Lansere | 6–1, 6–1 |
| 2020 | Tournament cancelled due to the COVID-19 pandemic | | |
| 2021 | (France) Estelle Cascino (France) Jessika Ponchet | (United Kingdom) Eden Silva (Belgium) Kimberley Zimmermann | 0–6, 7–5, [10–7] |
| 2022 | (Mexico) Fernanda Contreras (Switzerland) Lulu Sun | (Greece) Valentini Grammatikopoulou; Anastasia Tikhonova | 7–5, 6–2 |
| 2023 | Sofya Lansere (Czech Republic) Anna Sisková | (Colombia) María Herazo González (United States) Adriana Reami | 6–0, 3–6, [10–6] |
| 2024 | (France) Émeline Dartron (France) Tiantsoa Sarah Rakotomanga Rajaonah | (France) Estelle Cascino (France) Carole Monnet | 6–3, 1–6, [12–10] |
| 2025 | (Czech Republic) Gabriela Knutson (Czech Republic) Anna Sisková | (France) Émeline Dartron (France) Tiantsoa Sarah Rakotomanga Rajaonah | 6–2, 6–2 |
| 2026 | (Sweden) Caijsa Hennemann (Sweden) Lisa Zaar | (Brazil) Ingrid Martins; Ekaterina Ovcharenko | 6–7^{(5–7)}, 7–5, [10–7] |
