= Margot Yerolymos =

French tennis player

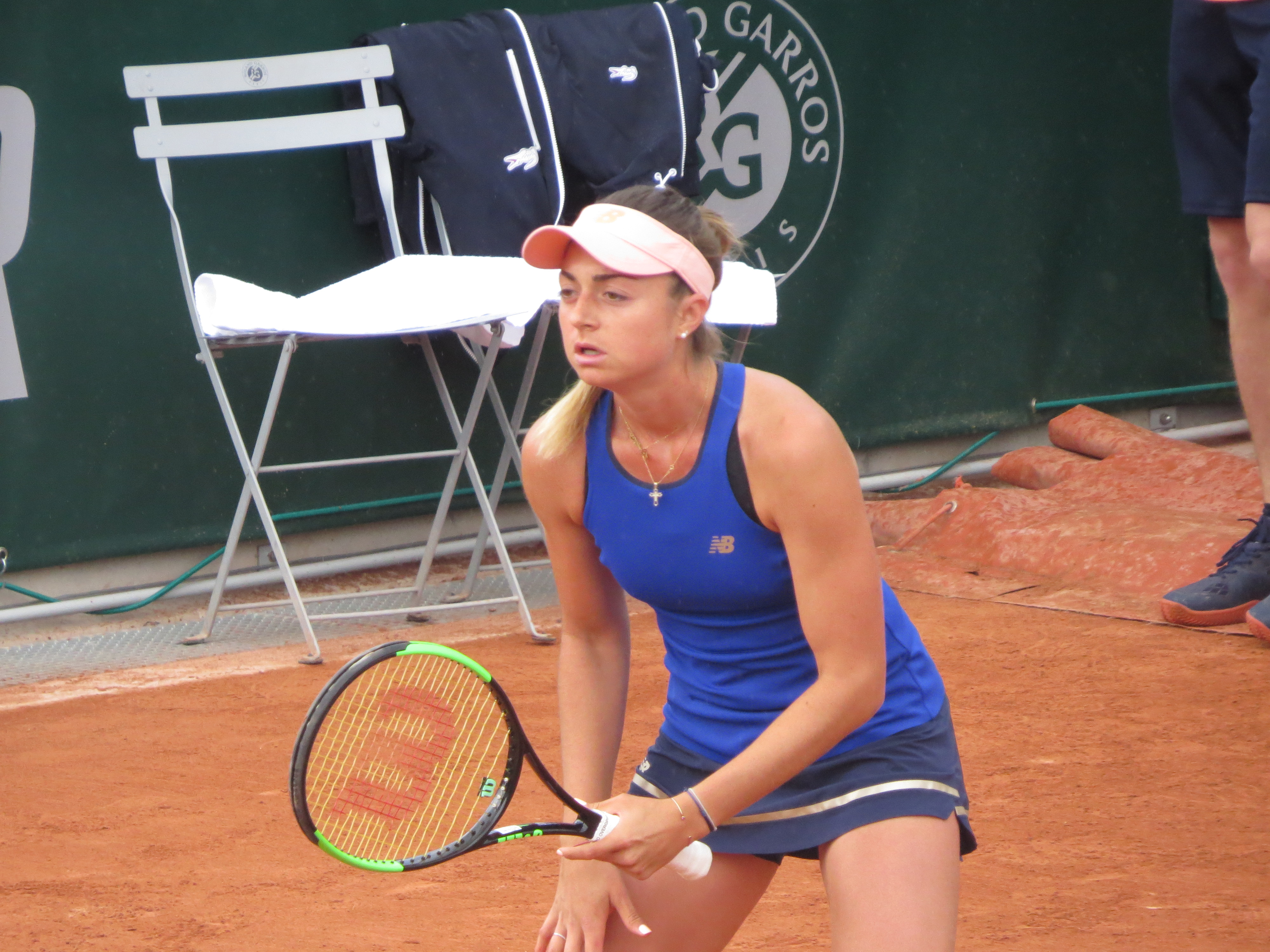
- Yerolymos at the 2019 French Open
- Country (sports): France
- Residence: Martigues, France
- Born: 19 April 1997 (age 29) Martigues
- Height: 1.78 m (5 ft 10 in)
- Turned pro: 2013
- Plays: Right (two-handed backhand)
- Coach: Mathilde Johansson (Feb 2018-present)
- Prize money: US$ 142,528

Singles
- Career record: 241–179
- Career titles: 5 ITF
- Highest ranking: No. 306 (10 August 2020)

Grand Slam singles results
- French Open: Q2 (2018)

Doubles
- Career record: 66–63
- Career titles: 3 ITF
- Highest ranking: No. 348 (12 June 2017)

Grand Slam doubles results
- French Open: 1R (2017, 2021)

Grand Slam mixed doubles results
- French Open: 1R (2019)

Margot Yerolymos (French: [maʁɡo jeʁɔlimos]; born 19 April 1997) is a French former professional tennis player.

Yerolymos has career-high WTA rankings of 306 in singles and 348 in doubles. She won five singles titles and three doubles titles in tournaments of the ITF Women's Circuit.

== Career ==
Yerolymos made her Grand Slam debut at the 2017 French Open thanks to a wildcard for the doubles draw, partnering Fiona Ferro; they lost their first-round match to the second-seeded pair of Ekaterina Makarova and Elena Vesnina.

== ITF Circuit finals ==
=== Singles: 11 (5 titles, 6 runner–ups) ===
Legend $25,000 tournaments $10/15,000 tournaments	Finals by surface Hard (1–2) Clay (4–4)

Result	W–L	Date	Tournament	Tier	Surface	Opponent	Score
Win	1–0	Aug 2015	ITF Plovdiv, Bulgaria	10,000	Clay	(Australia) Alexandra Nancarrow	6–2, 6–1
Loss	1–1	Oct 2015	ITF Sozopol, Bulgaria	10,000	Hard	(Bulgaria) Isabella Shinikova	3–6, 0–3 ret.
Loss	1–2	Nov 2015	ITF Heraklion, Greece	10,000	Hard	(Bulgaria) Viktoriya Tomova	3–6, 2–6
Loss	1–3	Feb 2016	ITF Hammamet, Tunisia	10,000	Clay	(Italy) Angelica Moratelli	2–6, 2–6
Win	2–3	Jun 2016	ITF Madrid, Spain	10,000	Clay	(Switzerland) Tess Sugnaux	6–3, 4–6, 6–3
Loss	2–4	Jun 2016	ITF Nieuwpoort, Belgium	10,000	Clay	(Netherlands) Quirine Lemoine	4–6, 3–6
Loss	2–5	Jul 2016	ITF Knokke, Belgium	10,000	Clay	(Spain) Eva Guerrero Álvarez	2–6, 3–6
Win	3–5	Sep 2016	ITF Nottingham, UK	10,000	Hard	(United Kingdom) Eden Silva	7–5, 6–1
Loss	3–6	Dec 2017	ITF Hammamet, Tunisia	15,000	Clay	(France) Sara Cakarevic	6–3, 3–6, 0–6
Win	4–6	Feb 2018	ITF Hammamet, Tunisia	15,000	Clay	(Romania) Andreea Roșca	4–6, 6–2, 6–0
Win	5–6	Apr 2018	ITF Hammamet, Tunisia	15,000	Clay	(Russia) Amina Anshba	6–1, 6–2

=== Doubles: 6 (3 titles, 3 runner-ups) ===
Legend $25,000 tournaments $10/15,000 tournaments	Finals by surface Hard (2–2) Clay (1–1)

Result	W–L	Date	Tournament	Tier	Surface	Partner	Opponents	Score
Loss	0–1	Apr 2015	ITF Pula, Italy	10,000	Clay	(Belgium) Kimberley Zimmermann	(Romania) Irina Bara (Romania) Oana Georgeta Simion	5–7, 4–6
Loss	0–2	Sep 2016	ITF Nottingham, UK	10,000	Hard	(United States) Dasha Ivanova	(United Kingdom) Sarah Beth Grey (United Kingdom) Olivia Nicholls	2–6, 4–6
Win	1–2	Apr 2017	ITF Antalya, Turkey	15,000	Hard	(Sweden) Jacqueline Cabaj Awad	(Russia) Amina Anshba (Netherlands) Nina Kruijer	7–6^{(7–5)}, 4–6, [10–8]
Win	2–2	Jan 2020	ITF Manacor, Spain	15,000	Hard	(Switzerland) Nina Stadler	(Russia) Maria Marfutina (Italy) Camilla Rosatello	2–6, 6–3, [10–5]
Win	3–2	Jun 2021	ITF Périgueux, France	25,000	Clay	(France) Diane Parry	(Burundi) Sada Nahimana (Czech Republic) Anna Sisková	6–4, 6–2
Loss	3–3	Oct 2022	ITF Reims, France	15,000	Hard (i)	(France) Mallaurie Noël	(Slovakia) Irina Balus (Switzerland) Céline Naef	2–6, 0–6
