= Eden Silva =

British tennis player (born 1996)

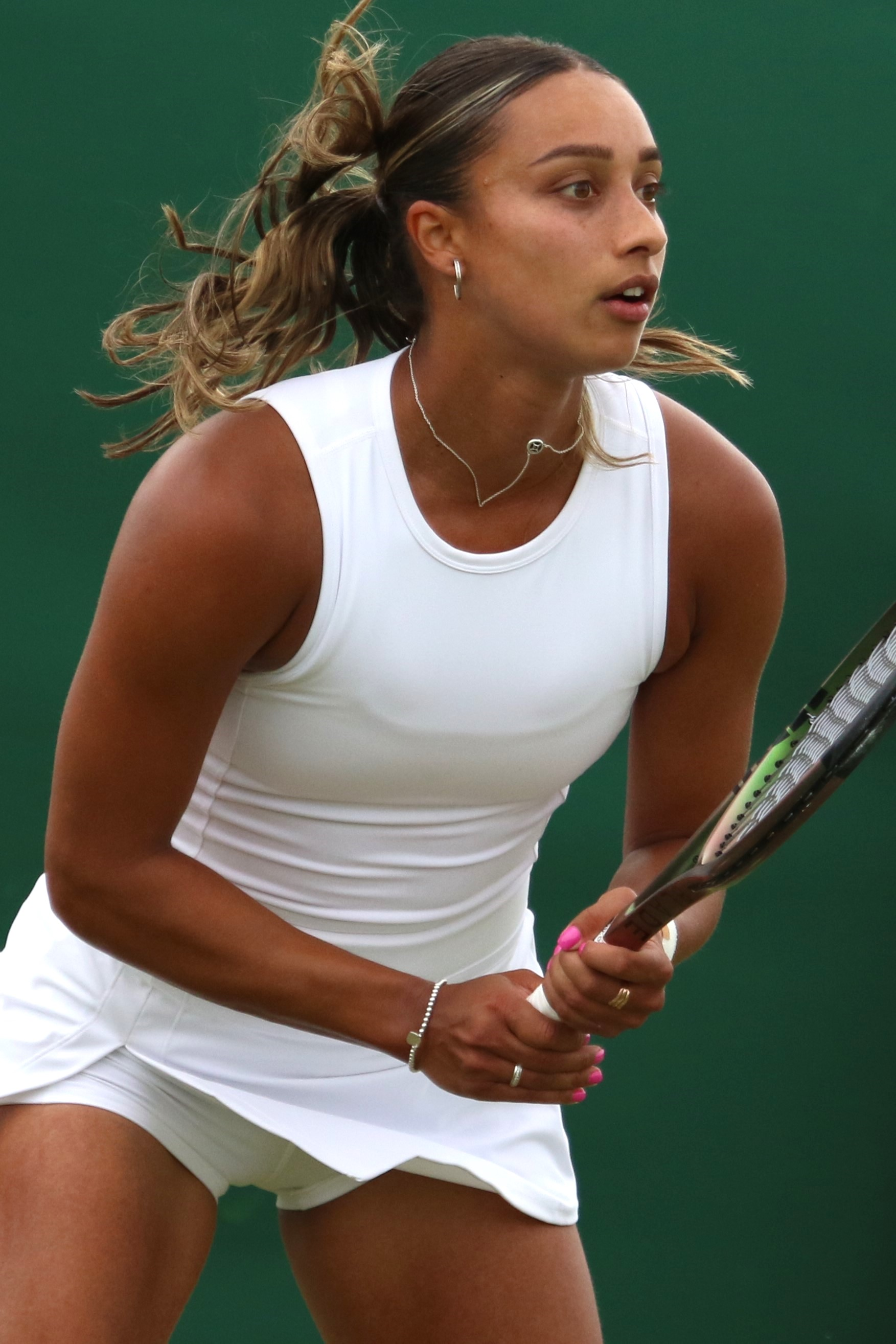
- Silva at the 2023 Wimbledon Championships
- Full name: Eden Giselle Silva
- Country (sports): Great Britain
- Residence: Essex, England
- Born: 14 March 1996 (age 30) London, England
- Height: 1.75 m (5 ft 9 in)
- Plays: Right (two-handed backhand)
- Prize money: $396,468

Singles
- Career record: 233–232
- Career titles: 2 ITF
- Highest ranking: No. 298 (3 April 2023)

Grand Slam singles results
- Wimbledon: Q2 (2021)

Doubles
- Career record: 213–188
- Career titles: 1 WTA 125
- Highest ranking: No. 112 (21 October 2024)
- Current ranking: No. 177 (21 September 2026)

Grand Slam doubles results
- Wimbledon: 1R (2021, 2022, 2024, 2025, 2026)

Grand Slam mixed doubles results
- Wimbledon: QF (2019, 2025)
- Last updated on: 22 September 2026.

Eden Giselle Silva (born 14 March 1996) is a British tennis player of Russian and Sri Lankan descent who specializes in doubles. She has career-high WTA rankings of 112 in doubles and No. 298 in singles, achieved on 21 October 2024 and 3 April 2023, respectively.

== Career ==
Silva made her WTA Tour debut at the 2018 Dubai Tennis Championships in the doubles draw, partnering Lisa Ponomar. Partnering Evan Hoyt, she reached the mixed doubles quarterfinals at the 2019 Wimbledon Championships, where they lost to eventual champions Ivan Dodig and Latisha Chan. Silva made her singles WTA Tour debut as a qualifier at the 2021 Nottingham Open, losing in the first round to fellow Briton Tara Moore. Playing with Joshua Paris at the 2025 Wimbledon Championships, she reached the mixed doubles quarterfinals at the grass-court major for the second time. Teaming up with Freya Christie she won her first WTA 125 doubles title at the 2026 Ilkley Open, defeating Madeleine Brooks and Amelia Rajecki in the final.

== Personal life ==
Silva is from Gants Hill in East London. She has also done modelling work, after being scouted by an agency through Instagram.

== Grand Slam performance timelines ==
Key
W	F	SF	QF	#R	RR	Q#	DNQ	A	NH

(W) winner; (F) finalist; (SF) semifinalist; (QF) quarterfinalist; (#R) rounds 4, 3, 2, 1; (RR) round-robin stage; (Q#) qualification round; (DNQ) did not qualify; (A) absent; (NH) not held; (SR) strike rate (events won / competed); (W–L) win–loss record.
To avoid confusion and double counting, these charts are updated at the conclusion of a tournament or when the player's participation has ended.

== WTA 125 finals ==
=== Doubles: 2 (1 title, 1 runner-up) ===
Result	W–L	Date	Tournament	Surface	Partner	Opponents	Score
Loss	0–1	Jun 2025	Ilkley Trophy, United Kingdom	Grass	(Russia) Vitalia Diatchenko	(Netherlands) Isabelle Haverlag (Switzerland) Simona Waltert	1–6, 1–6
Win	1–1	Jun 2026	Ilkley Trophy, United Kingdom	Grass	(United Kingdom) Freya Christie	(United Kingdom) Madeleine Brooks (United Kingdom) Amelia Rajecki	1–6, 6–4, [10–7]

== ITF Circuit finals ==
=== Singles: 6 (2 titles, 4 runner-ups) ===
Legend W25 tournaments W10/15 tournaments	Finals by surface Hard (2–3) Carpet (0–1)

Result	W–L	Date	Tournament	Tier	Surface	Opponent	Score
Loss	0–1	May 2014	ITF Sharm El Sheikh, Egypt	10k	Hard	(United Kingdom) Katie Boulter	6–4, 4–6, 5–7
Loss	0–2	Sep 2016	ITF Nottingham, United Kingdom	10k	Hard	(France) Margot Yerolymos	5–7, 1–6
Loss	0–3	Apr 2017	ITF Óbidos, Portugal	15k	Carpet	(Spain) Nuria Párrizas Díaz	4–6, 3–6
Loss	0–4	Oct 2017	ITF Wirral, UK	15k	Hard (i)	(United Kingdom) Samantha Murray	2–6, 2–6
Win	1–4	Nov 2017	ITF Helsinki, Finland	15k	Hard (i)	(Switzerland) Tess Sugnaux	6–3, 1–6, 7–5
Win	2–4	Apr 2022	ITF Nottingham, UK	W25	Hard	(United States) Robin Montgomery	6–4, 6–4

=== Doubles: 33 (16 titles, 17 runner-ups) ===
Legend W100 tournaments W80 tournaments W60/75 tournaments W40/50 tournaments W25/35 tournaments W10/15 tournaments	Finals by surface Hard (15–15) Clay (1–2)

Result	W–L	Date	Tournament	Tier	Surface	Partner	Opponents	Score
Loss	0–1	Nov 2013	ITF Mumbai, India	15k	Hard	(Chinese Taipei) Hsu Ching-wen	(United States) Anamika Bhargava (United Kingdom) Emily Webley-Smith	4–6, 5–7
Win	1–1	Mar 2014	ITF Sharm El Sheikh, Egypt	10k	Hard	(United Kingdom) Emily Webley-Smith	(Czech Republic) Nikola Horáková (Japan) Akari Inoue	6–7 ^{(4)}, 6–4, [10–5]
Loss	1–2	Apr 2014	ITF Sharm El Sheikh	10k	Hard	(Japan) Yuka Mori	(United Kingdom) Harriet Dart (United Kingdom) Katy Dunne	4–6, 4–6
Loss	1–3	Sep 2014	ITF Antalya, Turkey	10k	Hard	(Japan) Yumi Nakano	(Japan) Akiko Omae (Japan) Kotomi Takahata	5–7, 2–6
Win	2–3	Sep 2014	ITF Sharm El Sheikh	10k	Hard	(Romania) Ioana Ducu	(Japan) Yui Saikai (Japan) Natsumi Yokota	6–2, 6–4
Loss	2–4	Sep 2014	ITF Sharm El Sheikh	10k	Hard	(Romania) Ioana Ducu	(United Kingdom) Harriet Dart (Turkey) Melis Sezer	5–7, 1–6
Loss	2–5	Oct 2014	ITF Sharm El Sheikh	10k	Hard	(United Kingdom) Harriet Dart	(India) Sharmada Balu (China) Wang Xiyao	5–7, 6–2, [9–11]
Win	3–5	Dec 2014	ITF Sharm El Sheikh	10k	Hard	(Netherlands) Rosalie van der Hoek	(Kazakhstan) Alexandra Grinchishina (Kazakhstan) Ekaterina Klyueva	6–4, 2–6, [10–5]
Win	4–5	Jul 2018	ITF Corroios, Portugal	15k	Hard	(Cambodia) Andrea Ka	(Portugal) Francisca Jorge (Spain) Maria Luque Moreno	3–6, 6–1, [10–5]
Loss	4–6	Oct 2018	ITF Cherbourg-en-Cotentin, France	25k	Hard (i)	(United Kingdom) Alicia Barnett	(Poland) Katarzyna Piter (Czech Republic) Barbora Štefková	2–6, 1–6
Loss	4–7	Mar 2019	Open de Seine-et-Marne, France	W60	Hard (i)	(United Kingdom) Sarah Beth Grey	(United Kingdom) Harriet Dart (Netherlands) Lesley Kerkhove	3–6, 2–6
Win	5–7	May 2019	ITF Les Franqueses del Vallès, Spain	W60	Hard	(France) Jessika Ponchet	(United Kingdom) Jodie Burrage (United Kingdom) Olivia Nicholls	6–3, 6–4
Win	6–7	Jul 2019	ITF Palmela, Portugal	W25	Hard	(United Kingdom) Sarah Beth Grey	(France) Estelle Cascino (Bulgaria) Julia Terziyska	7–5, 6–2
Win	7–7	Aug 2019	GB Pro-Series Foxhill, UK	W25	Hard	(United Kingdom) Sarah Beth Grey	(United Kingdom) Naiktha Bains (India) Ankita Raina	6–2, 7–5
Loss	7–8	Aug 2019	Jinan Open, China	W60	Hard	(United Kingdom) Samantha Murray	(China) Yuan Yue (China) Zheng Wushuang	6–1, 4–6, [7–10]
Loss	7–9	Feb 2021	ITF Potchefstroom, South Africa	W25	Hard	(United Kingdom) Naomi Broady	(Netherlands) Lesley Pattinama Kerkhove (Netherlands) Bibiane Schoofs	6–4, 3–6, [6–10]
Loss	7–10	May 2021	Open Saint-Gaudens, France	W60	Hard	(Belgium) Kimberley Zimmermann	(France) Estelle Cascino (France) Jessika Ponchet	6–0, 5–7, [7–10]
Loss	7–11	Sep 2021	Montreux Ladies Open, Switzerland	W60	Clay	(Switzerland) Conny Perrin	(France) Estelle Cascino (Italy) Camilla Rosatello	6–7^{(4)}, 4–6
Win	8–11	Sep 2021	ITF Santarém, Portugal	W25	Hard	(Belgium) Marie Benoît	(United Kingdom) Alicia Barnett (United Kingdom) Olivia Nicholls	7–5, 6–1
Loss	8–12	Oct 2021	ITF Les Franqueses del Vallès, Spain	W80+H	Hard	(Switzerland) Susan Bandecchi	(Russia) Irina Khromacheva (Australia) Arina Rodionova	6–2, 3–6, [6–10]
Win	9–12	Nov 2022	ITF Saint-Étienne, France	W25	Hard (i)	(Switzerland) Conny Perrin	(Russia) Ekaterina Kazionova (Russia) Ekaterina Makarova	6–4, 4–6, [10–6]
Loss	9–13	Jan 2023	ITF Sunderland, UK	W60	Hard (i)	(Belgium) Magali Kempen	(United Kingdom) Freya Christie (United Kingdom) Ali Collins	3–6, 6–7^{(5)}
Win	10–13	Mar 2023	ITF Bangalore, India	W25	Hard	(Bosnia and Herzegovina) Dea Herdželaš	(Portugal) Francisca Jorge (Portugal) Matilde Jorge	3–6, 6–4, [10–7]
Loss	10–14	Mar 2023	ITF Bangalore, India	W40	Hard	(Greece) Valentini Grammatikopoulou	(Portugal) Francisca Jorge (Portugal) Matilde Jorge	7–5, 0–6, [3–10]
Loss	10–15	Apr 2023	Zaragoza Open, Spain	W80	Clay	(United States) Asia Muhammad	(France) Diane Parry (Netherlands) Arantxa Rus	1–6, 6–4, [5–10]
Loss	10–16	Aug 2023	Aberto da República, Brazil	W80	Hard	(Ukraine) Valeriya Strakhova	(Brazil) Carolina Alves (Argentina) Julia Riera	2–6, 3–6
Win	11–16	Nov 2023	Calgary Challenger, Canada	W60+H	Hard (i)	(United Kingdom) Sarah Beth Grey	(United States) Hanna Chang (Serbia) Katarina Jokić	6–4, 6–4
Loss	11–17	Feb 2024	Open de l'Isère, France	W75	Hard (i)	(United Kingdom) Sarah Beth Grey	(United Kingdom) Emily Appleton (United Kingdom) Freya Christie	6–3, 1–6, [9–11]
Win	12–17	Mar 2024	Branik Maribor Open, Slovenia	W75	Hard (i)	Anastasia Tikhonova	(Thailand) Luksika Kumkhum (Thailand) Peangtarn Plipuech	7–5, 6–3
Win	13–17	Apr 2026	ITF Roehampton, United Kingdom	W50	Hard	(United Kingdom) Freya Christie	(United Kingdom) Emily Appleton (Slovakia) Viktória Hrunčáková	7–6^{(7)}, 3–6, [10–6]
Win	14–17	Apr 2026	ITF Nottingham, United Kingdom	W35	Hard	(United Kingdom) Freya Christie	(Czech Republic) Aneta Laboutková (Slovenia) Kristina Novak	6–1, 6–0
Win	15–17	Jun 2026	Internazionali di Caserta, Italy	W75	Clay	(United Kingdom) Freya Christie	(Spain) Yvonne Cavallé Reimers (Brazil) Laura Pigossi	3–6, 6–4, [10–4]
Win	16–17	Oct 2026	ITF Wrexham, UK	W100	Hard (i)	(United Kingdom) Freya Christie	(Japan) Hiroko Kuwata (India) Ankita Raina	6–2, 6–3
