= 2013 Aegon GB Pro-Series Barnstaple =

- Date: 28 October–3 November
- Edition: 6th
- Category: ITF Women's Circuit
- Prize money: $75,000
- Surface: Hard (indoor)
- Location: Barnstaple, United Kingdom

Champions

Singles
- (Russia) Marta Sirotkina

Doubles
- (United Kingdom) Naomi Broady / (Czech Republic) Kristýna Plíšková
← 2012 ·	Aegon GB Pro-Series Barnstaple	· 2014 →

The 2013 Aegon GB Pro-Series Barnstaple was a professional tennis tournament played on indoor hard courts. It was the sixth edition of the tournament which was part of the 2013 ITF Women's Circuit, offering a total of $75,000 in prize money. It took place in Barnstaple, United Kingdom, on 28 October–3 November 2013.

== WTA entrants ==
=== Seeds ===
Country	Player	Rank^{1}	Seed
GER	Annika Beck	48	1
USA	Alison Riske	58	2
SRB	Vesna Dolonc	103	3
GBR	Johanna Konta	112	4
SLO	Tadeja Majerič	117	5
GBR	Heather Watson	133	6
CZE	Kristýna Plíšková	136	7
LIE	Stephanie Vogt	141	8

- ^{1} Rankings as of 21 October 2013

=== Other entrants ===
The following players received wildcards into the singles main draw:

- (United Kingdom) Naomi Broady
- (United Kingdom) Melanie South
- (United Kingdom) Emily Webley-Smith
- (United Kingdom) Jade Windley

The following players received entry from the qualifying draw:

- (United States) Bernarda Pera
- (United Kingdom) Anna Smith
- (Lithuania) Lina Stančiūtė
- (Netherlands) Eva Wacanno

The following player received entry by a lucky loser spot:

- (Slovakia) Karin Morgošová

The following player received entry by a junior exempt:

- (Czech Republic) Kateřina Siniaková

== Champions ==
=== Singles ===
- (Russia) Marta Sirotkina def. (Czech Republic) Kristýna Plíšková 6–7^{(5–7)}, 6–3, 7–6^{(8–6)}

=== Doubles ===
- (United Kingdom) Naomi Broady / (Czech Republic) Kristýna Plíšková def. (Romania) Raluca Olaru / (Austria) Tamira Paszek 6–3, 3–6, [10–5]
