= 2011 Aegon GB Pro-Series Barnstaple =

- Date: 24–30 October
- Edition: 4th
- Surface: Hard (indoor)
- Location: Barnstaple, Great Britain

Champions

Singles
- (United Kingdom) Anne Keothavong

Doubles
- (Czech Republic) Eva Birnerová / (United Kingdom) Anne Keothavong
- Aegon GB Pro-Series Barnstaple

The 2011 Aegon GB Pro-Series Barnstaple was a professional tennis tournament played on hard courts. It was the fourth edition of the tournament which was part of the 2011 ITF Women's Circuit. It took place in Barnstaple, Great Britain between 23 and 29 October 2011.

== WTA entrants ==
=== Seeds ===
Country	Player	Rank^{1}	Seed
GER	Mona Barthel	74	1
GBR	Heather Watson	87	2
GBR	Anne Keothavong	93	3
CZE	Andrea Hlaváčková	98	4
ROU	Alexandra Cadanțu	104	5
CZE	Eva Birnerová	105	6
AUS	Anastasia Rodionova	109	7
NED	Michaëlla Krajicek	114	8

- ^{1} Rankings are as of October 17, 2011.

=== Other entrants ===
The following players received wildcards into the singles main draw:

- (United Kingdom) Naomi Broady
- (United Kingdom) Amanda Elliott
- (United Kingdom) Anna Fitzpatrick
- (United Kingdom) Tara Moore

The following players received entry from the qualifying draw:

- (Poland) Marta Domachowska
- (Australia) Johanna Konta
- (Slovakia) Kristína Kučová
- (Russia) Marta Sirotkina

The following player received entry from a Lucky loser spot:

- (Portugal) Maria João Köhler

== Champions ==
=== Singles ===
(United Kingdom) Anne Keothavong def. (Poland) Marta Domachowska, 6–1, 6–3

=== Doubles ===
(Czech Republic) Eva Birnerová / (United Kingdom) Anne Keothavong def. (Austria) Sandra Klemenschits / (Germany) Tatjana Malek, 7–5, 6–1
