= 2014 Open Saint-Gaudens Midi-Pyrénées – Singles =

Singles
- 2014 Open Saint-Gaudens Midi-Pyrénées

Final
- Champion: (Montenegro) Danka Kovinić
- Runner-up: (France) Pauline Parmentier
- Score: 6–1, 6–2

Events
Singles	Doubles
← 2013 ·	Open Saint-Gaudens Midi-Pyrénées	· 2015 →

Paula Ormaechea was the defending champion, having won the event in 2013, but decided to compete at the Internazionali BNL d'Italia instead.

Danka Kovinić won the tournament, defeating Pauline Parmentier in the final, 6–1, 6–2.

== Seeds ==
1. (Canada) Sharon Fichman (first round)
2. (United Kingdom) Johanna Konta (semifinals)
3. (Ukraine) Maryna Zanevska (first round)
4. (France) Claire Feuerstein (quarterfinals)
5. (Montenegro) Danka Kovinić (champion)
6. (Romania) Alexandra Dulgheru (second round)
7. (Paraguay) Verónica Cepede Royg (first round)
8. (Turkey) Çağla Büyükakçay (second round)

== Main draw ==
=== Key ===
- Q = Qualifier
- WC = Wild card
- LL = Lucky loser
- Alt = Alternate
- SE = Special exempt
- PR = Protected ranking
- ITF = ITF entry
- JE = Junior exempt
- w/o = Walkover
- r = Retired
- d = Defaulted
- SR = Special ranking

=== Finals ===
Semifinals
JE	(Croatia) Ana Konjuh	2	0
5	(Montenegro) Danka Kovinić	6	6
(France) Pauline Parmentier	6	5	7
2	(United Kingdom) Johanna Konta	4	7	5

Final
5	(Montenegro) Danka Kovinić	6	6
(France) Pauline Parmentier	1	2

=== Top half ===
First round
1	(Canada) S Fichman	5	2
(Italy) A Brianti	7	6
(Liechtenstein) S Vogt	7	6
Q	(Georgia (country)) E Gorgodze	5	3
(United States) A Kiick	1	2
JE	(Croatia) A Konjuh	6	6
(Ukraine) K Kozlova	6	7^{7}
7	(Paraguay) V Cepede Royg	3	6^{2}
4	(France) C Feuerstein	3	6	6
WC	(France) A Hesse	6	3	3
(Czech Republic) E Birnerová	6	7^{8}
(United States) N Gibbs	4	6^{6}
Q	(France) F Ferro	1	6	6
(Ukraine) A Vasylyeva	6	3	3
(Argentina) M Irigoyen	0	2
5	(Montenegro) D Kovinić	6	6

Second round
(Italy) A Brianti	6	7^{7}
(Liechtenstein) S Vogt	4	6^{0}
JE	(Croatia) A Konjuh	5	6	6
(Ukraine) K Kozlova	7	0	2
4	(France) C Feuerstein	6	0
(Czech Republic) E Birnerová	2	0^{r}
Q	(France) F Ferro	3	3
5	(Montenegro) D Kovinić	6	6

Quarterfinals
(Italy) A Brianti	1	6	2
JE	(Croatia) A Konjuh	6	3	6
4	(France) C Feuerstein	6^{3}	4
5	(Montenegro) D Kovinić	7^{7}	6

Semifinals
JE	(Croatia) A Konjuh	2	0
5	(Montenegro) D Kovinić	6	6

=== Bottom half ===
First round
8	(Turkey) Ç Büyükakçay	5	6	6
WC	(France) S Foretz Gacon	7	3	2
(Japan) R Ozaki	5	6	2
(France) P Parmentier	7	2	6
WC	(France) J Suvrijn	6^{5}	1
Q	(Peru) B Botto	7^{7}	6
(Ukraine) L Tsurenko	6	6
3	(Ukraine) M Zanevska	2	3
6	(Romania) A Dulgheru	7	6
(Kazakhstan) Y Putintseva	5	2
(Russia) M Sirotkina	6	6^{5}	6
Q	(Uzbekistan) N Abduraimova	3	7^{7}	2
WC	(Israel) D Khazaniuk	3	5
LL	(France) M Georges	6	7
(Ukraine) L Kichenok	4	3
2	(United Kingdom) J Konta	6	6

Second round
8	(Turkey) Ç Büyükakçay	4	2
(France) P Parmentier	6	6
Q	(Peru) B Botto	6	0
(Ukraine) L Tsurenko	4	0^{r}
6	(Romania) A Dulgheru	4	5
(Russia) M Sirotkina	6	7
LL	(France) M Georges	3	4
2	(United Kingdom) J Konta	6	6

Quarterfinals
(France) P Parmentier	6	1
Q	(Peru) B Botto	2	0^{r}
(Russia) M Sirotkina	6	2	0
2	(United Kingdom) J Konta	2	6	6

Semifinals
(France) P Parmentier	6	5	7
2	(United Kingdom) J Konta	4	7	5
