= 2011 Aegon GB Pro-Series Barnstaple – Singles =

Singles
- 2011 Aegon GB Pro-Series Barnstaple

Final
- Champion: (United Kingdom) Anne Keothavong
- Runner-up: (Poland) Marta Domachowska
- Score: 6–1, 6–3

Events
| Singles | Doubles |
| ← 2010 · | Aegon GB Pro-Series Barnstaple | · 2012 → |

Alison Riske was the defending champion, but lost in the first round to Andrea Hlaváčková.

Anne Keothavong won the title defeating Marta Domachowska in the final 6–1, 6–3.

== Seeds ==
1. (Germany) Mona Barthel (semifinals)
2. (United Kingdom) Heather Watson (second round)
3. (United Kingdom) Anne Keothavong (champion)
4. (Czech Republic) Andrea Hlaváčková (second round)
5. (Romania) Alexandra Cadanțu (first round, retired)
6. (Czech Republic) Eva Birnerová (first round)
7. (Australia) Anastasia Rodionova (first round)
8. (Netherlands) Michaëlla Krajicek (quarterfinals)

== Main draw ==
=== Key ===
- Q = Qualifier
- WC = Wild card
- LL = Lucky loser
- Alt = Alternate
- SE = Special exempt
- PR = Protected ranking
- ITF = ITF entry
- JE = Junior exempt
- w/o = Walkover
- r = Retired
- d = Defaulted
- SR = Special ranking

=== Finals ===
Semifinals
1 | (Germany) Mona Barthel | 3 | 6^{5}
3 | (United Kingdom) Anne Keothavong | 6 | 7^{7}
Q | (Poland) Marta Domachowska | 7^{7} | 2 | 6
(Russia) Ekaterina Bychkova | 6^{3} | 6 | 3

Final
3 | (United Kingdom) Anne Keothavong | 6 | 6
Q | (Poland) Marta Domachowska | 1 | 3

=== Top half ===
First round
1 | (Germany) M Barthel | 6 | 6
(Italy) K Knapp | 3 | 3
(Luxembourg) M Minella | 4 | 7^{8} | 6
(France) C Garcia | 6 | 6^{6} | 4
(Austria) Y Meusburger | 6 | 6
WC | (United Kingdom) A Fitzpatrick | 3 | 3
(Germany) T Malek | 1 | 1
8 | (Netherlands) M Krajicek | 6 | 6
3 | (United Kingdom) A Keothavong | 6 | 6
(Netherlands) K Bertens | 2 | 4
(Spain) A Parra Santonja | 6^{3} | 4
(United States) J Craybas | 7^{7} | 6
(Switzerland) S Vögele | 6 | 5 | 6
Q | (Slovakia) K Kučová | 1 | 7 | 2
(Bulgaria) E Kostova | 3 | 6 | 6
6 | (Czech Republic) E Birnerová | 6 | 4 | 4

Second round
1 | (Germany) M Barthel | 6 | 7
(Luxembourg) M Minella | 1 | 5
(Austria) Y Meusburger | 2 | 1
8 | (Netherlands) M Krajicek | 6 | 6
3 | (United Kingdom) A Keothavong | 6 | 6
(United States) J Craybas | 2 | 0
(Switzerland) S Vögele | 6 | 6
(Bulgaria) E Kostova | 4 | 3

Quarterfinals
1 | (Germany) M Barthel | 6 | 6
8 | (Netherlands) M Krajicek | 4 | 3
3 | (United Kingdom) A Keothavong | 6 | 7^{7}
(Switzerland) S Vögele | 3 | 6^{4}

Semifinals
1 | (Germany) M Barthel | 3 | 6^{5}
3 | (United Kingdom) A Keothavong | 6 | 7^{7}

=== Bottom half ===
First round
5 | (Romania) A Cadanțu | 1 | 0 | r
LL | (Portugal) MJ Köhler | 6 | 3
(Germany) K Wörle | 4 | 3
WC | (United Kingdom) T Moore | 6 | 6
Q | (Poland) M Domachowska | 6 | 6
(Ukraine) O Savchuk | 3 | 4
(United States) A Riske | 2 | 4
4 | (Czech Republic) A Hlaváčková | 6 | 6
7 | (Australia) A Rodionova | 7^{8} | 4 | 6^{5}
WC | (United Kingdom) N Broady | 6^{6} | 6 | 7^{7}
(Russia) E Bychkova | 6 | 6
Q | (Russia) M Sirotkina | 3 | 2
(United Kingdom) L Robson | 3 | 3
Q | (Australia) J Konta | 6 | 2 | r
WC | (United Kingdom) A Elliott | 0 | 1
2 | (United Kingdom) H Watson | 6 | 6

Second round
LL | (Portugal) MJ Köhler | 7^{8} | 6
WC | (United Kingdom) T Moore | 6^{6} | 3
Q | (Poland) M Domachowska | 3 | 6 | 6
4 | (Czech Republic) A Hlaváčková | 6 | 4 | 3
WC | (United Kingdom) N Broady | 3 | 7^{7} | 4
(Russia) E Bychkova | 6 | 6^{4} | 6
(United Kingdom) L Robson | 6 | 3 | 6
2 | (United Kingdom) H Watson | 1 | 6 | 3

Quarterfinals
LL | (Portugal) MJ Köhler | 6 | 2 | 2
Q | (Poland) M Domachowska | 2 | 6 | 6
(Russia) E Bychkova | 6 | 6
(United Kingdom) L Robson | 4 | 4

Semifinals
Q | (Poland) M Domachowska | 7^{7} | 2 | 6
(Russia) E Bychkova | 6^{3} | 6 | 3
