= 2011 Aegon GB Pro-Series Barnstaple – Doubles =

Doubles
- 2011 Aegon GB Pro-Series Barnstaple

Final
- Champions: (Czech Republic) Eva Birnerová (United Kingdom) Anne Keothavong
- Runners-up: (Austria) Sandra Klemenschits (Germany) Tatjana Malek
- Score: 7–5, 6–1

Events
Singles	Doubles
← 2010 ·	Aegon GB Pro-Series Barnstaple	· 2012 →

Andrea Hlaváčková and Michaëlla Krajicek were the defending champions, but Hlaváčková chose not to participate. Krajicek competed with Caroline Garcia, but lost in the semifinals to Eva Birnerová and Anne Keothavong.

Eva Birnerová and Anne Keothavong won the title defeating Sandra Klemenschits and Tatjana Malek in the final 7–5, 6–1.

== Seeds ==
1. (Austria) Sandra Klemenschits / (Germany) Tatjana Malek (final)
2. (Czech Republic) Eva Birnerová / (United Kingdom) Anne Keothavong (champions)
3. (Finland) Emma Laine / (Germany) Kathrin Wörle (quarterfinals)
4. (Portugal) Maria João Koehler / (Hungary) Katalin Marosi (quarterfinals)

== Draw ==
=== Key ===
- Q = Qualifier
- WC = Wild card
- LL = Lucky loser
- Alt = Alternate
- SE = Special exempt
- PR = Protected ranking
- ITF = ITF entry
- JE = Junior exempt
- w/o = Walkover
- r = Retired
- d = Defaulted
- SR = Special ranking

=== Draw ===
First round
(United Kingdom) A Fitzpatrick (United Kingdom) T Moore	0	5
(Russia) E Bychkova (United States) J Craybas	6	7
(Bulgaria) E Kostova (Poland) B Sobaszkiewicz	w/o
(United Kingdom) A Elliott (Australia) J Konta
(Luxembourg) M Minella (Switzerland) S Vögele	6^{6}	4
(France) C Garcia (Netherlands) M Krajicek	7^{8}	6
(United Kingdom) L Robson (United Kingdom) H Watson	4	6	[9]
4	(Portugal) MJ Koehler (Hungary) K Marosi	6	2	[11]
(Netherlands) K Bertens (Denmark) M Ejdesgaard	2	6	[12]
(Ukraine) T Arefyeva (Russia) M Sirotkina	6	3	[10]

Quarterfinals
1	(Austria) S Klemenschits (Germany) T Malek	2	6	[11]
(Russia) E Bychkova (United States) J Craybas	6	3	[9]
3	(Finland) E Laine (Germany) K Wörle	3	6	[2]
(Bulgaria) E Kostova (Poland) B Sobaszkiewicz	6	0	[10]
(France) C Garcia (Netherlands) M Krajicek	6	7^{7}
4	(Portugal) MJ Koehler (Hungary) K Marosi	4	6^{4}
(Netherlands) K Bertens (Denmark) M Ejdesgaard	6	6^{5}	[6]
2	(Czech Republic) E Birnerová (United Kingdom) A Keothavong	3	7^{7}	[10]

Semifinals
1	(Austria) S Klemenschits (Germany) T Malek	6	6
(Bulgaria) E Kostova (Poland) B Sobaszkiewicz	2	4
(France) C Garcia (Netherlands) M Krajicek	5	4
2	(Czech Republic) E Birnerová (United Kingdom) A Keothavong	7	6

Finals
1	(Austria) S Klemenschits (Germany) T Malek	5	1
2	(Czech Republic) E Birnerová (United Kingdom) A Keothavong	7	6
