= 2013 Aegon GB Pro-Series Barnstaple – Singles =

Singles
- 2013 Aegon GB Pro-Series Barnstaple

Final
- Champion: (Russia) Marta Sirotkina
- Runner-up: (Czech Republic) Kristýna Plíšková
- Score: 6–7^{(5–7)}, 6–3, 7–6^{(8–6)}

Events
Singles	Doubles
← 2012 ·	Aegon GB Pro-Series Barnstaple	· 2014 →

Annika Beck was the defending champion, having won the event in 2012, but retired after losing the first set of her semifinal against Kristýna Plíšková.

Marta Sirotkina won the tournament, defeating Plíšková in the final, 6–7^{(5–7)}, 6–3, 7–6^{(8–6)}.

== Seeds ==
1. (Germany) Annika Beck (semifinals; retired)
2. (United States) Alison Riske (quarterfinals)
3. (Serbia) Vesna Dolonc (second round)
4. (United Kingdom) Johanna Konta (semifinals)
5. (Slovenia) Tadeja Majerič (second round)
6. (United Kingdom) Heather Watson (quarterfinals; retired)
7. (Czech Republic) Kristýna Plíšková (final)
8. (Liechtenstein) Stephanie Vogt (second round)

== Main draw ==
=== Key ===
- Q = Qualifier
- WC = Wild card
- LL = Lucky loser
- Alt = Alternate
- SE = Special exempt
- PR = Protected ranking
- ITF = ITF entry
- JE = Junior exempt
- w/o = Walkover
- r = Retired
- d = Defaulted
- SR = Special ranking

=== Finals ===
Semifinals
1	(Germany) Annika Beck	3	0^{r}
7	(Czech Republic) Kristýna Plíšková	6	0
4	(United Kingdom) Johanna Konta	6	6^{7}	6^{5}
(Russia) Marta Sirotkina	3	7^{9}	7^{7}

Final
7	(Czech Republic) Kristýna Plíšková	7^{7}	3	6^{6}
(Russia) Marta Sirotkina	6^{5}	6	7^{8}

=== Top half ===
First round
1	(Germany) A Beck	6	6
(Italy) G Gatto-Monticone	1	4
Q	(Lithuania) L Stančiūtė	6^{8}	6	3
Q	(Netherlands) E Wacanno	7^{10}	3	6
(Czech Republic) R Voráčová	2	6	2
WC	(United Kingdom) N Broady	6	4	6
(Italy) A Brianti	2	3
8	(Liechtenstein) S Vogt	6	6
3	(Serbia) V Dolonc	6	6
(Czech Republic) K Vaňková	1	3
WC	(United Kingdom) M South	4	1
JE	(Czech Republic) K Siniaková	6	6
(Romania) A Mitu	6^{3}	7^{7}	4
(Austria) T Paszek	7^{7}	6^{2}	6
(Czech Republic) E Birnerová	5	4
7	(Czech Republic) Kr Plíšková	7	6

Second round
1	(Germany) A Beck	6	6
Q	(Netherlands) E Wacanno	2	3
WC	(United Kingdom) N Broady	6	6
8	(Liechtenstein) S Vogt	3	2
3	(Serbia) V Dolonc	6^{4}	4
JE	(Czech Republic) K Siniaková	7^{7}	6
(Austria) T Paszek	1	4
7	(Czech Republic) Kr Plíšková	6	6

Quarterfinals
1	(Germany) A Beck	6	6
WC	(United Kingdom) N Broady	4	3
JE	(Czech Republic) K Siniaková	5	3
7	(Czech Republic) Kr Plíšková	7	6

Semifinals
1	(Germany) A Beck	3	0^{r}
7	(Czech Republic) Kr Plíšková	6	0

=== Bottom half ===
First round
6	(United Kingdom) H Watson	6	6
(Slovakia) K Kučová	2	1
WC	(United Kingdom) J Windley	2	5
(Croatia) A Vrljić	6	7
(United Kingdom) T Moore	6	6
(Latvia) D Marcinkēviča	1	2
WC	(United Kingdom) E Webley-Smith	2	1
4	(United Kingdom) J Konta	6	6
5	(Slovenia) T Majerič	7^{7}	6
Q	(United Kingdom) A Smith	6^{3}	4
(Russia) M Sirotkina	6	6
Q	(United States) B Pera	3	2
(Switzerland) T Bacsinszky	5	7^{9}	6
(Germany) K Barrois	7	6^{7}	4
LL	(Slovakia) K Morgošová	2	0
2	(United States) A Riske	6	6

Second round
6	(United Kingdom) H Watson	6	5	6
(Croatia) A Vrljić	4	7	2
(United Kingdom) T Moore	4	4
4	(United Kingdom) J Konta	6	6
5	(Slovenia) T Majerič	3	6^{1}
(Russia) M Sirotkina	6	7^{7}
(Switzerland) T Bacsinszky	4	6^{6}
2	(United States) A Riske	6	7^{8}

Quarterfinals
6	(United Kingdom) H Watson	0^{r}
4	(United Kingdom) J Konta	4
(Russia) M Sirotkina	6	6
2	(United States) A Riske	4	2

Semifinals
4	(United Kingdom) J Konta	6	6^{7}	6^{5}
(Russia) M Sirotkina	3	7^{9}	7^{7}
