= 2015 Open Engie Saint-Gaudens Midi-Pyrénées – Singles =

Singles
- 2015 Open Engie Saint-Gaudens Midi-Pyrénées

Final
- Champion: (Spain) María Teresa Torró Flor
- Runner-up: (Slovakia) Jana Čepelová
- Score: 6–1, 6–0

Events
Singles	Doubles
← 2014 ·	Open Engie Saint-Gaudens Midi-Pyrénées	· 2016 →

Danka Kovinić was the defending champion, but she lost in the first round to Tessah Andrianjafitrimo.

María Teresa Torró Flor won the title, defeating Jana Čepelová in the final, 6–1, 6–0.

== Seeds ==
1. (Brazil) Teliana Pereira (quarterfinals; defaulted^{1})
2. (Montenegro) Danka Kovinić (first round)
3. (Poland) Magda Linette (semifinals)
4. (China) Zhu Lin (first round)
5. (Colombia) Mariana Duque (second round)
6. (Russia) Elizaveta Kulichkova (second round)
7. (Spain) Lourdes Domínguez Lino (quarterfinals)
8. (Slovakia) Jana Čepelová (final)
- ^{1} Pereira was defaulted after the first set for throwing her racquet into the crowd

== Main draw ==
=== Key ===
- Q = Qualifier
- WC = Wild card
- LL = Lucky loser
- Alt = Alternate
- SE = Special exempt
- PR = Protected ranking
- ITF = ITF entry
- JE = Junior exempt
- w/o = Walkover
- r = Retired
- d = Defaulted
- SR = Special ranking

=== Finals ===
Semifinals
8	(Slovakia) Jana Čepelová	3	6	6
(Belarus) Aliaksandra Sasnovich	6	3	2
3	(Poland) Magda Linette	1	3
(Spain) María Teresa Torró Flor	6	6

Final
8	(Slovakia) Jana Čepelová	1	0
(Spain) María Teresa Torró Flor	6	6

=== Top half ===
First round
1	(Brazil) T Pereira	6	6
WC	(Russia) M Sirotkina	4	1
(Japan) M Eguchi	4	7^{8}	3
(Japan) H Kuwata	6	6^{6}	6
Q	(United States) N Melichar	3	1
Q	(France) F Ferro	6	6
(Japan) R Ozaki	5	6^{4}
8	(Slovakia) J Čepelová	7	7^{7}
4	(China) L Zhu	6^{4}	2
(Slovakia) K Kučová	7^{7}	6
(Belarus) A Sasnovich	6	4	6
(Israel) J Glushko	2	6	4
LL	(Croatia) D Vekić	6	7^{7}
LL	(Uzbekistan) A Amanmuradova	1	6^{2}
(Israel) S Pe'er	3	1
7	(Spain) L Domínguez Lino	6	6

Second round
1	(Brazil) T Pereira	6	6
(Japan) H Kuwata	0	2
Q	(France) F Ferro	2	3
8	(Slovakia) J Čepelová	6	6
(Slovakia) K Kučová	3	6	1
(Belarus) A Sasnovich	6	4	6
LL	(Croatia) D Vekić	1	0^{r}
7	(Spain) L Domínguez Lino	6	2

Quarterfinals
1	(Brazil) T Pereira	6^{5}	0^{d}
8	(Slovakia) J Čepelová	7^{7}	0
(Belarus) A Sasnovich	7	0	6
7	(Spain) L Domínguez Lino	5	6	1

Semifinals
8	(Slovakia) J Čepelová	3	6	6
(Belarus) A Sasnovich	6	3	2

=== Bottom half ===
First round
6	(Russia) E Kulichkova	6	7
WC	(France) I Ramialison	4	5
WC	(France) A Hesse	4	6	7
(Uzbekistan) N Abduraimova	6	4	5
(China) Y Wang	7^{7}	4	6
(Romania) S Cîrstea	6^{1}	6	2
(Austria) T Paszek	0	1
3	(Poland) M Linette	6	6
5	(Colombia) M Duque	6	6
(Brazil) B Haddad Maia	1	3
(Spain) MT Torró Flor	6	6
Q	(Paraguay) V Cepede Royg	3	2
Q	(Australia) O Rogowska	6	5	1
(United Kingdom) J Konta	2	7	6
WC	(France) T Andrianjafitrimo	4	6	7
2	(Montenegro) D Kovinić	6	4	5

Second round
6	(Russia) E Kulichkova	3	5
WC	(France) A Hesse	6	7
(China) Y Wang	2	4
3	(Poland) M Linette	6	6
5	(Colombia) M Duque	4	6	6^{6}
(Spain) MT Torró Flor	6	1	7^{8}
(United Kingdom) J Konta	6	6
WC	(France) T Andrianjafitrimo	2	3

Quarterfinals
WC	(France) A Hesse	6^{5}	3
3	(Poland) M Linette	7^{7}	6
(Spain) MT Torró Flor	4	7^{7}	6
(United Kingdom) J Konta	6	6^{4}	2

Semifinals
3	(Poland) M Linette	1	3
(Spain) MT Torró Flor	6	6
