= 2016 Open Engie Saint-Gaudens Midi-Pyrénées – Singles =

Singles
- 2016 Open Engie Saint-Gaudens Midi-Pyrénées

Final
- Champion: (Russia) Irina Khromacheva
- Runner-up: (Greece) Maria Sakkari
- Score: 1–6, 7–6^{(7–3)}, 6–1

Events
Singles	Doubles
← 2015 ·	Open Engie Saint-Gaudens Midi-Pyrénées	· 2017 →

María Teresa Torró Flor was the defending champion, but chose not to participate.

Irina Khromacheva won the title, defeating Maria Sakkari in the final, 1–6, 7–6^{(7–3)}, 6–1.

== Seeds ==
1. (Spain) Lourdes Domínguez Lino (second round)
2. (Greece) Maria Sakkari (final)
3. (Austria) Tamira Paszek (second round)
4. (Switzerland) Viktorija Golubic (quarterfinals)
5. (Switzerland) Romina Oprandi (withdrew)
6. (Japan) Miyu Kato (first round)
7. (Belgium) Ysaline Bonaventure (first round)
8. (Switzerland) Amra Sadiković (quarterfinals)

== Main draw ==
=== Key ===
- Q = Qualifier
- WC = Wild card
- LL = Lucky loser
- Alt = Alternate
- SE = Special exempt
- PR = Protected ranking
- ITF = ITF entry
- JE = Junior exempt
- w/o = Walkover
- r = Retired
- d = Defaulted
- SR = Special ranking

=== Finals ===
Semifinals
(Russia) Irina Khromacheva	7^{7}	6
Q	(United Kingdom) Amanda Carreras	6^{5}	1
(Brazil) Paula Cristina Gonçalves	1	2
2	(Greece) Maria Sakkari	6	6

Final
(Russia) Irina Khromacheva	1	7^{7}	6
2	(Greece) Maria Sakkari	6	6^{3}	1

=== Top half ===
First round
1	(Spain) L Domínguez Lino	6	6
(France) A Hesse	1	3
(China) Z Yang	6^{0}	4
(Russia) I Khromacheva	7^{7}	6
(China) L Zhu	6^{4}	5
(Paraguay) V Cepede Royg	7^{7}	7
WC	(France) V Muntean	3	6	6
7	(Belgium) Y Bonaventure	6	2	4
4	(Switzerland) V Golubic	6	7^{9}
Q	(Brazil) B Haddad Maia	3	6^{7}
(France) F Ferro	4	1
WC	(Israel) D Khazaniuk	6	6
(Australia) Ar Rodionova	2	3
Q	(United Kingdom) A Carreras	6	6
(Spain) S Sorribes Tormo	5	4
LL	(France) M Arcangioli	7	6

Second round
1	(Spain) L Domínguez Lino	4	1
(Russia) I Khromacheva	6	6
(Paraguay) V Cepede Royg	5	6	6
WC	(France) V Muntean	7	2	1
4	(Switzerland) V Golubic	3	6	6
WC	(Israel) D Khazaniuk	6	4	1
Q	(United Kingdom) A Carreras	6	6
LL	(France) M Arcangioli	3	3

Quarterfinals
(Russia) I Khromacheva	6	6
(Paraguay) V Cepede Royg	1	2
4	(Switzerland) V Golubic	6	1	5
Q	(United Kingdom) A Carreras	2	6	7

Semifinals
(Russia) I Khromacheva	7^{7}	6
Q	(United Kingdom) A Carreras	6^{5}	1

=== Bottom half ===
First round
6	(Japan) M Kato	3	3
PR	(United States) M Oudin	6	6
(Brazil) PC Gonçalves	6	2	6
(France) M Georges	2	6	1
Q	(France) A Albié	6^{4}	1^{r}
Q	(Russia) N Vikhlyantseva	7^{7}	2
WC	(France) E Salas	1	1
3	(Austria) T Paszek	6	6
8	(Switzerland) A Sadiković	6	6
(China) Y Zhang	3	4
(Serbia) I Jorović	2	6	6
(France) M Johansson	6	3	2
(Luxembourg) M Minella	4	7^{7}	6
LL	(Czech Republic) R Voráčová	6	6^{5}	0
WC	(Spain) A Martí Riembau	2	0
2	(Greece) M Sakkari	6	6

Second round
PR	(United States) M Oudin	6	4	5
(Brazil) PC Gonçalves	1	6	7
Q	(Russia) N Vikhlyantseva	6	6
3	(Austria) T Paszek	3	4
8	(Switzerland) A Sadiković	6	6
(Serbia) I Jorović	4	3
(Luxembourg) M Minella	3	4
2	(Greece) M Sakkari	6	6

Quarterfinals
(Brazil) PC Gonçalves	5	7^{8}	6
Q	(Russia) N Vikhlyantseva	7	6^{6}	3
8	(Switzerland) A Sadiković	4	5
2	(Greece) M Sakkari	6	7

Semifinals
(Brazil) PC Gonçalves	1	2
2	(Greece) M Sakkari	6	6
