= 2012 Open Saint-Gaudens Midi-Pyrénées – Doubles =

Doubles
- 2012 Open Saint-Gaudens Midi-Pyrénées

Final
- Champions: (Serbia) Vesna Dolonc (Russia) Irina Khromacheva
- Runners-up: (United Kingdom) Naomi Broady (Israel) Julia Glushko
- Score: 6–2, 6–0

Events
Singles	Doubles
← 2011 ·	Open Saint-Gaudens Midi-Pyrénées	· 2013 →

Caroline Garcia and Aurélie Védy were the defending champions, but both players chose not to participate.

Vesna Dolonc and Irina Khromacheva won the title, defeating Naomi Broady and Julia Glushko in the final, 6–2, 6–0.

== Seeds ==
1. (Bosnia and Herzegovina) Mervana Jugić-Salkić / (Austria) Sandra Klemenschits (semifinals)
2. (Romania) Edina Gallovits-Hall / (France) Kristina Mladenovic (first round)
3. (Spain) Leticia Costas-Moreira / (Spain) Inés Ferrer Suárez (first round)
4. (United States) Julia Cohen / (Australia) Daniella Jeflea (first round)

== Draw ==
=== Key ===
- Q = Qualifier
- WC = Wild card
- LL = Lucky loser
- Alt = Alternate
- SE = Special exempt
- PR = Protected ranking
- ITF = ITF entry
- JE = Junior exempt
- w/o = Walkover
- r = Retired
- d = Defaulted
- SR = Special ranking

First round
(France) C Feuerstein (France) V Larrière	6	6
(Luxembourg) A Kremer (Slovenia) P Rampre	4	4
4	(United States) J Cohen (Australia) D Jeflea	3	5
(Denmark) M Ejdesgaard (United States) M Oudin	6	7
(France) I Brémond (France) S Lefèvre	0	4
(Serbia) V Dolonc (Russia) I Khromacheva	6	6
(United States) I Falconi (United Kingdom) H Watson	6^{4}	6	[7]
(United Kingdom) N Broady (Israel) J Glushko	7^{7}	0	[10]
(Poland) M Domachowska (Japan) E Sema	6	6
3	(Spain) L Costas (Spain) I Ferrer Suárez	4	4
(Switzerland) A Sadiković (Russia) V Savinykh	6	6
(France) M Georges (France) J Ginier	3	4
(Netherlands) R Hogenkamp (Netherlands) A Rus	6	2	[10]
2	(Romania) E Gallovits-Hall (France) K Mladenovic	4	6	[8]

Quarterfinals
1	(Bosnia and Herzegovina) M Jugić-Salkić (Austria) S Klemenschits	2	6	[10]
(France) C Feuerstein (France) V Larrière	6	3	[6]
(Denmark) M Ejdesgaard (United States) M Oudin	2	2
(Serbia) V Dolonc (Russia) I Khromacheva	6	6
(United Kingdom) N Broady (Israel) J Glushko	6	6
(Poland) M Domachowska (Japan) E Sema	2	4
(Switzerland) A Sadiković (Russia) V Savinykh	6	6
(Netherlands) R Hogenkamp (Netherlands) A Rus	3	4

Semifinals
1	(Bosnia and Herzegovina) M Jugić-Salkić (Austria) S Klemenschits	6	4	[7]
(Serbia) V Dolonc (Russia) I Khromacheva	3	6	[10]
(United Kingdom) N Broady (Israel) J Glushko	4	7^{7}	[10]
(Switzerland) A Sadiković (Russia) V Savinykh	6	6^{5}	[5]

Finals
(Serbia) V Dolonc (Russia) I Khromacheva	6	6
(United Kingdom) N Broady (Israel) J Glushko	2	0
