= 2013 Aegon GB Pro-Series Barnstaple – Doubles =

Tennis tournament

Doubles
- 2013 Aegon GB Pro-Series Barnstaple

Final
- Champions: (United Kingdom) Naomi Broady (Czech Republic) Kristýna Plíšková
- Runners-up: (Romania) Raluca Olaru (Austria) Tamira Paszek
- Score: 6–3, 3–6, [10–5]

Events
Singles	Doubles
← 2012 ·	Aegon GB Pro-Series Barnstaple	· 2014 →

Akgul Amanmuradova and Vesna Dolonc were the defending champions, having won the event in 2012, but both players decided not to participate in 2013.

Naomi Broady and Kristýna Plíšková won the tournament, defeating Raluca Olaru and Tamira Paszek, 6–3, 3–6, [10–5].

== Seeds ==
1. (Czech Republic) Eva Birnerová / (Czech Republic) Renata Voráčová (semifinals)
2. (Romania) Raluca Olaru / (Austria) Tamira Paszek (final)
3. (Germany) Kristina Barrois / (Croatia) Ana Vrljić (quarterfinals)
4. (United Kingdom) Naomi Broady / (Czech Republic) Kristýna Plíšková (champions)

== Draw ==
=== Key ===
- Q = Qualifier
- WC = Wild card
- LL = Lucky loser
- Alt = Alternate
- SE = Special exempt
- PR = Protected ranking
- ITF = ITF entry
- JE = Junior exempt
- w/o = Walkover
- r = Retired
- d = Defaulted
- SR = Special ranking

First round
1	(Czech Republic) E Birnerová (Czech Republic) R Voráčová	6	6
(Austria) S Klemenschits (United States) A Riske	4	4
WC	(United Kingdom) J Rae (United Kingdom) A Smith	4	6	[10]
(United Kingdom) N Slater (Liechtenstein) S Vogt	6	2	[5]
4	(United Kingdom) N Broady (Czech Republic) Kr Plíšková	6	6
(Romania) E Bogdan (United Kingdom) E Webley-Smith	2	3
(Latvia) D Marcinkēviča (Czech Republic) K Vaňková	6	6
WC	(United Kingdom) L Brown (United Kingdom) A Fitzpatrick	2	2
(United Kingdom) J Konta (United Kingdom) H Watson	6	6
(Slovenia) T Majerič (Romania) A Mitu	3	2
(Italy) G Gatto-Monticone (Italy) C Rosatello	3	7	[5]
3	(Germany) K Barrois (Croatia) A Vrljić	6	5	[10]
(United Kingdom) M South (United Kingdom) J Windley	3	4
(Netherlands) D Schuurs (Netherlands) E Wacanno	6	6
WC	(Germany) A Beck (Czech Republic) H Birnerová	6^{5}	4
2	(Romania) R Olaru (Austria) T Paszek	7^{7}	6

Quarterfinals
1	(Czech Republic) E Birnerová (Czech Republic) R Voráčová	6	6
WC	(United Kingdom) J Rae (United Kingdom) A Smith	1	4
4	(United Kingdom) N Broady (Czech Republic) Kr Plíšková	6	6
(Latvia) D Marcinkēviča (Czech Republic) K Vaňková	2	1
(United Kingdom) J Konta (United Kingdom) H Watson	3	7^{7}	[11]
3	(Germany) K Barrois (Croatia) A Vrljić	6	6^{5}	[9]
(Netherlands) D Schuurs (Netherlands) E Wacanno	6	2	[4]
2	(Romania) R Olaru (Austria) T Paszek	2	6	[10]

Semifinals
1	(Czech Republic) E Birnerová (Czech Republic) R Voráčová	4	5
4	(United Kingdom) N Broady (Czech Republic) Kr Plíšková	6	7
(United Kingdom) J Konta (United Kingdom) H Watson	5	4
2	(Romania) R Olaru (Austria) T Paszek	7	6

Final
4	(United Kingdom) N Broady (Czech Republic) Kr Plíšková	6	3	[10]
2	(Romania) R Olaru (Austria) T Paszek	3	6	[5]
