= 2012 President's Cup – Women's doubles =

Women's doubles
- 2012 President's Cup (tennis)

Final
- Champions: (Georgia (country)) Oksana Kalashnikova (Russia) Marta Sirotkina
- Runners-up: (Ukraine) Lyudmyla Kichenok (Ukraine) Nadiya Kichenok
- Score: 3–6, 6–4, [10–2]

Events
Singles	men	women
Doubles	men	women
- President's Cup (tennis)

The 2012 President's Cup Women's doubles was a professional tennis tournament played on outdoor hard courts in Astana, Kazakhstan.

Vitalia Diatchenko and Galina Voskoboeva were the defending champions, but both chose not to participate.

Oksana Kalashnikova and Marta Sirotkina won the title, defeating Lyudmyla Kichenok and Nadiya Kichenok 3–6, 6–4, [10–2] in the final.

== Seeds ==
1. (Ukraine) Lyudmyla Kichenok / (Ukraine) Nadiya Kichenok (final)
2. (France) Stéphanie Foretz Gacon / (Germany) Kathrin Wörle (semifinals)
3. (China) Liu Wanting / (China) Sun Shengnan (first round)
4. (Georgia (country)) Oksana Kalashnikova / (Russia) Marta Sirotkina (champions)

== Draw ==
Key

- Q = Qualifier
- WC = Wild card
- LL = Lucky loser
- Alt = Alternate
- ITF = ITF entry
- PR = Protected ranking
- SR = Special ranking
- SE = Special exempt
- JE = Junior exempt
- JR = Junior Accelerator Programme entrant
- CO = College Accelerator Programme entrant
- NG = Next Gen Accelerator Program entrant
- w/o = Walkover
- r = Retired
- d = Defaulted

=== Draw ===
First round
1	(Ukraine) L Kichenok (Ukraine) N Kichenok	6	6
(Russia) E Bychkova (Kyrgyzstan) K Palkina	2	1
(Russia) A Artamonova (Russia) P Monova	2	3
(Ukraine) V Kapshay (Russia) E Yashina	6	6
3	(China) W Liu (China) S Sun	4	3
(Thailand) L Kumkhum (Thailand) V Wongteanchai	6	6
(Belarus) K Milevskaya (Russia) E Pashkova
(South Korea) S-h Hee (Japan) M Ninomiya	w/o
Alt	(Luxembourg) A Kremer (Lithuania) L Stančiūtė	2	3
WC	(Kazakhstan) A Danilina (Kazakhstan) Z Khairudinova	6	6
WC	(Kazakhstan) E Klyueva (Kazakhstan) A Yepisheva	2	0
4	(Georgia (country)) O Kalashnikova (Russia) M Sirotkina	6	6
(Turkey) Ç Büyükakçay (Belarus) L Marozava	w/o
(Slovenia) T Majerič (Bulgaria) A Naydenova
(Poland) P Kania (Russia) K Lykina	4	2
2	(France) S Foretz Gacon (Germany) K Wörle	6	6

Quarterfinals
1	(Ukraine) L Kichenok (Ukraine) N Kichenok	6	6
(Ukraine) V Kapshay (Russia) E Yashina	1	0
(Thailand) L Kumkhum (Thailand) V Wongteanchai	1	6^{3}
(South Korea) S-h Hee (Japan) M Ninomiya	6	7^{7}
WC	(Kazakhstan) A Danilina (Kazakhstan) Z Khairudinova	1	2
4	(Georgia (country)) O Kalashnikova (Russia) M Sirotkina	6	6
(Turkey) Ç Büyükakçay (Belarus) L Marozava	6	3	[7]
2	(France) S Foretz Gacon (Germany) K Wörle	3	6	[10]

Semifinals
1	(Ukraine) L Kichenok (Ukraine) N Kichenok	6	6
(South Korea) S-h Hee (Japan) M Ninomiya	4	1
4	(Georgia (country)) O Kalashnikova (Russia) M Sirotkina	7	4	[10]
2	(France) S Foretz Gacon (Germany) K Wörle	5	6	[2]

Finals
1	(Ukraine) L Kichenok (Ukraine) N Kichenok	6	4	[2]
4	(Georgia (country)) O Kalashnikova (Russia) M Sirotkina	3	6	[10]
