= 2013 Open Saint-Gaudens Midi-Pyrénées =

- Date: 13–19 May
- Edition: 17th
- Category: ITF Women's Circuit
- Prize money: $50,000+H
- Surface: Clay
- Location: Saint-Gaudens, France

Champions

Singles
- (Argentina) Paula Ormaechea

Doubles
- (Israel) Julia Glushko / (Argentina) Paula Ormaechea
← 2012 ·	Open Saint-Gaudens Midi-Pyrénées	· 2014 →

The 2013 Open Saint-Gaudens Midi-Pyrénées was a professional tennis tournament played on outdoor clay courts. It was the 17th edition of the tournament which was part of the 2013 ITF Women's Circuit, offering a total of $50,000+H in prize money. It took place in Saint-Gaudens, France, on 13–19 May 2013.

== Singles entrants ==
=== Seeds ===
Country	Player	Rank^{1}	Seed
NED	Arantxa Rus	87	1
TPE	Chang Kai-chen	121	2
USA	Jessica Pegula	125	3
CAN	Sharon Fichman	126	4
BRA	Teliana Pereira	129	5
USA	Vania King	131	6
SLO	Polona Hercog	134	7
FRA	Claire Feuerstein	137	8

- ^{1} Rankings as of 6 May 2013

=== Other entrants ===
The following players received wildcards into the singles main draw:

- (Israel) Deniz Khazaniuk
- (France) Victoria Larrière
- (France) Alizé Lim
- (France) Aravane Rezaï

The following players received entry from the qualifying draw:

- (United Kingdom) Elena Baltacha
- (Germany) Anna-Lena Friedsam
- (France) Myrtille Georges
- (Belgium) Alison Van Uytvanck

The following players received entry into the singles main draw as lucky losers:

- (France) Séverine Beltrame
- (Russia) Yuliya Kalabina

== Champions ==
=== Singles ===
- (Argentina) Paula Ormaechea def. (Germany) Dinah Pfizenmaier 6–3, 3–6, 6–4

=== Doubles ===
- (Israel) Julia Glushko / (Argentina) Paula Ormaechea def. (Canada) Stéphanie Dubois / (Japan) Kurumi Nara 7–5, 7–6^{(13–11)}
