= 2012 Open Saint-Gaudens Midi-Pyrénées =

- Date: 14–20 May
- Edition: 16th
- Category: ITF Women's Circuit
- Prize money: $50,000+H
- Surface: Clay
- Location: Saint-Gaudens, France

Champions

Singles
- (Colombia) Mariana Duque

Doubles
- (Serbia) Vesna Dolonc / (Russia) Irina Khromacheva
← 2011 ·	Open Saint-Gaudens Midi-Pyrénées	· 2013 →

The 2012 Open Saint-Gaudens Midi-Pyrénées was a professional tennis tournament played on outdoor clay courts. It was the 16th edition of the tournament which was part of the 2012 ITF Women's Circuit. It took place in Saint-Gaudens, France, on 14–20 May 2012.

== Singles entrants ==
=== Seeds ===
Country	Player	Rank^{1}	Seed
RUS	Alexandra Panova	79	1
ROU	Edina Gallovits-Hall	85	2
NED	Arantxa Rus	87	3
USA	Irina Falconi	100	4
GBR	Heather Watson	110	5
HUN	Melinda Czink	122	6
RUS	Valeria Savinykh	125	7
GBR	Laura Robson	126	8

- ^{1} Rankings as of 7 May 2012

=== Other entrants ===
The following players received wildcards into the singles main draw:

- (France) Jessica Ginier
- (France) Myrtille Georges
- (France) Victoria Larrière
- (Germany) Tatjana Malek

The following players received entry from the qualifying draw:

- (United Kingdom) Naomi Broady
- (Netherlands) Richèl Hogenkamp
- (Bosnia and Herzegovina) Mervana Jugić-Salkić
- (United States) Melanie Oudin

The following players received entry as lucky losers:

- (Spain) Leticia Costas
- (Spain) Inés Ferrer Suárez

The following players received entry by a Junior Exempt:

- (Russia) Irina Khromacheva

== Champions ==
=== Singles ===
- (Colombia) Mariana Duque def. (France) Claire Feuerstein 4–6, 6–3, 6–2

=== Doubles ===
- (Serbia) Vesna Dolonc / (Russia) Irina Khromacheva def. (United Kingdom) Naomi Broady / (Israel) Julia Glushko 6–2, 6–0
