= 2015 Open Engie Saint-Gaudens Midi-Pyrénées =

- Date: 11–17 May
- Edition: 19th
- Category: ITF Women's Circuit
- Prize money: $50,000+H
- Surface: Clay
- Location: Saint-Gaudens, France

Champions

Singles
- (Spain) María Teresa Torró Flor

Doubles
- (Colombia) Mariana Duque / (Israel) Julia Glushko
← 2014 ·	Open Engie Saint-Gaudens Midi-Pyrénées	· 2016 →

The 2015 Open Engie Saint-Gaudens Midi-Pyrénées was a professional tennis tournament played on outdoor clay courts. It was the nineteenth edition of the tournament and part of the 2015 ITF Women's Circuit, offering a total of $50,000+H in prize money. It took place in Saint-Gaudens, France, on 11–17 May 2015.

== Singles main draw entrants ==
=== Seeds ===
Country	Player	Rank^{1}	Seed
BRA	Teliana Pereira	75	1
MNE	Danka Kovinić	95	2
POL	Magda Linette	105	3
CHN	Zhu Lin	107	4
COL	Mariana Duque	110	5
RUS	Elizaveta Kulichkova	111	6
ESP	Lourdes Domínguez Lino	113	7
SVK	Jana Čepelová	116	8

- ^{1} Rankings as of 4 May 2015

=== Other entrants ===
The following players received wildcards into the singles main draw:

- (France) Tessah Andrianjafitrimo
- (France) Amandine Hesse
- (France) Irina Ramialison
- (Russia) Marta Sirotkina

The following players received entry from the qualifying draw:

- (Paraguay) Verónica Cepede Royg
- (France) Fiona Ferro
- (United States) Nicole Melichar
- (Australia) Olivia Rogowska

The following players received entry by a lucky loser spot:

- (Uzbekistan) Akgul Amanmuradova
- (Croatia) Donna Vekić

== Champions ==
=== Singles ===
- (Spain) María Teresa Torró Flor def. (Slovakia) Jana Čepelová, 6–1, 6–0

=== Doubles ===
- (Colombia) Mariana Duque / (Israel) Julia Glushko def. (Brazil) Beatriz Haddad Maia / (United States) Nicole Melichar, 1–6, 7–6^{(7–5)}, [10–4]
