= 2012 Open Saint-Gaudens Midi-Pyrénées – Singles =

Singles
- 2012 Open Saint-Gaudens Midi-Pyrénées

Final
- Champion: (Colombia) Mariana Duque Mariño
- Runner-up: (France) Claire Feuerstein
- Score: 4–6, 6–3, 6–2

Events
| Singles | Doubles |
| ← 2011 · | Open Saint-Gaudens Midi-Pyrénées | · 2013 → |

Anastasia Pivovarova was the defending champion, but chose not to participate.

Mariana Duque Mariño won the title, defeating Claire Feuerstein in the final, 4–6, 6–3, 6–2.

== Seeds ==
1. (Russia) Alexandra Panova (second round)
2. (Romania) Edina Gallovits-Hall (second round)
3. (Netherlands) Arantxa Rus (second round)
4. (United States) Irina Falconi (first round)
5. (United Kingdom) Heather Watson (first round)
6. (Hungary) Melinda Czink (first round)
7. (Russia) Valeria Savinykh (semifinals)
8. (Japan) Erika Sema (first round)

== Main draw ==
=== Key ===
- Q = Qualifier
- WC = Wild card
- LL = Lucky loser
- Alt = Alternate
- SE = Special exempt
- PR = Protected ranking
- ITF = ITF entry
- JE = Junior exempt
- w/o = Walkover
- r = Retired
- d = Defaulted
- SR = Special ranking

=== Finals ===
Semifinals
(France) Claire Feuerstein | 6 | 6
7 | (Russia) Valeria Savinykh | 3 | 0
(Colombia) Mariana Duque Mariño | 6 | 7^{11}
(France) Aravane Rezaï | 1 | 6^{9}

Final
(France) Claire Feuerstein | 6 | 3 | 2
(Colombia) Mariana Duque Mariño | 4 | 6 | 6

=== Top half ===
First round
1 | (Russia) A Panova | 6 | 4 | 7^{7}
(Serbia) V Dolonc | 2 | 6 | 6^{5}
(Slovenia) P Rampre | 3 | 6 | 5
(France) C Feuerstein | 6 | 1 | 7
LL | (Spain) I Ferrer Suárez | 6 | 6
WC | (France) J Ginier | 1 | 4
(France) K Mladenovic | 6 | 6
5 | (United Kingdom) H Watson | 2 | 1
4 | (United States) I Falconi | 4 | 6^{3}
WC | (Germany) T Malek | 6 | 7^{7}
LL | (Spain) L Costas | 3 | 1
(United States) J Cohen | 6 | 6
(France) I Brémond | 6 | 4 | 2
Q | (Bosnia and Herzegovina) M Jugić-Salkić | 3 | 6 | 6
Q | (United Kingdom) N Broady | 6 | 1 | 4
7 | (Russia) V Savinykh | 3 | 6 | 6

Second round
1 | (Russia) A Panova | 2 | 5
(France) C Feuerstein | 6 | 7
LL | (Spain) I Ferrer Suárez | 4 | 6 | 1
(France) K Mladenovic | 6 | 4 | 1^{r}
WC | (Germany) T Malek | 3 | 4
(United States) J Cohen | 6 | 6
Q | (Bosnia and Herzegovina) M Jugić-Salkić | 4 | 6 | 5
7 | (Russia) V Savinykh | 6 | 2 | 7

Quarterfinals
(France) C Feuerstein | 6 | 6
LL | (Spain) I Ferrer Suárez | 3 | 4
(United States) J Cohen | 2 | 1
7 | (Russia) V Savinykh | 6 | 6

Semifinals
(France) C Feuerstein | 6 | 6
7 | (Russia) V Savinykh | 3 | 0

=== Bottom half ===
First round
8 | (Japan) E Sema | 1 | 2
(Poland) M Domachowska | 6 | 6
(Colombia) M Duque Mariño | 6 | 6
WC | (France) V Larrière | 3 | 2
(Bulgaria) E Kostova | 6 | 3 | 4
JE | (Russia) I Khromacheva | 2 | 6 | 6
(Ukraine) Y Beygelzimer | 3 | 4
3 | (Netherlands) A Rus | 6 | 6
6 | (Hungary) M Czink | 4 | 1
(France) A Rezaï | 6 | 6
Q | (Netherlands) R Hogenkamp | 7 | 6
(Ukraine) E Svitolina | 5 | 3
Q | (United States) M Oudin | 6 | 2 | 5
(Netherlands) B Schoofs | 3 | 6 | 7
WC | (France) M Georges | 4 | 3
2 | (Romania) E Gallovits-Hall | 6 | 6

Second round
(Poland) M Domachowska | 2 | 5
(Colombia) M Duque Mariño | 6 | 7
JE | (Russia) I Khromacheva | 3 | 6 | 6
3 | (Netherlands) A Rus | 6 | 3 | 3
(France) A Rezaï | 6 | 6
Q | (Netherlands) R Hogenkamp | 2 | 2
(Netherlands) B Schoofs | 6 | 6
2 | (Romania) E Gallovits-Hall | 4 | 0

Quarterfinals
(Colombia) M Duque Mariño | 7^{7} | 6
JE | (Russia) I Khromacheva | 6^{2} | 4
(France) A Rezaï | 7 | 6
(Netherlands) B Schoofs | 5 | 2

Semifinals
(Colombia) M Duque Mariño | 6 | 7^{11}
(France) A Rezaï | 1 | 6^{9}
