= 2016 Open Engie Saint-Gaudens Midi-Pyrénées – Doubles =

Doubles
- 2016 Open Engie Saint-Gaudens Midi-Pyrénées

Final
- Champions: (Netherlands) Demi Schuurs (Czech Republic) Renata Voráčová
- Runners-up: (Germany) Nicola Geuer (Switzerland) Viktorija Golubic
- Score: 6–1, 6–2

Events
Singles	Doubles
← 2015 ·	Open Engie Saint-Gaudens Midi-Pyrénées	· 2017 →

Mariana Duque and Julia Glushko were the defending champions, but both players chose not to participate.

Demi Schuurs and Renata Voráčová won the title, defeating Nicola Geuer and Viktorija Golubic in the final, 6–1, 6–2.

== Seeds ==
1. (Belgium) Ysaline Bonaventure / (Japan) Miyu Kato (quarterfinals, withdrew)
2. (Netherlands) Demi Schuurs / (Czech Republic) Renata Voráčová (champions)
3. (Paraguay) Verónica Cepede Royg / (Brazil) Paula Cristina Gonçalves (semifinals)
4. (Russia) Irina Khromacheva / (Luxembourg) Mandy Minella (quarterfinals)

== Draw ==
=== Key ===
- Q = Qualifier
- WC = Wild card
- LL = Lucky loser
- Alt = Alternate
- SE = Special exempt
- PR = Protected ranking
- ITF = ITF entry
- JE = Junior exempt
- w/o = Walkover
- r = Retired
- d = Defaulted
- SR = Special ranking

First round
(Australia) J Moore (India) P Thombare	2	7^{10}	[10]
(Argentina) T Búa (Ukraine) A Fomina	6	6^{8}	[7]
(Germany) N Geuer (Switzerland) V Golubic	7	6
(Bosnia and Herzegovina) E Burgić Bucko (France) V Muntean	5	3
(Brazil) B Haddad Maia (Austria) T Paszek	0	6^{2}
(China) Z Yang (China) L Zhu	6	7^{7}
(Israel) D Khazaniuk (United States) M Oudin	6	6
(France) F Ferro (France) M Georges	1	4

Quarterfinals
1	(Belgium) Y Bonaventure (Japan) M Kato
(Australia) J Moore (India) P Thombare	w/o
4	(Russia) I Khromacheva (Luxembourg) M Minella	4	5
(Germany) N Geuer (Switzerland) V Golubic	6	7
(China) Z Yang (China) L Zhu	7^{7}	4	[8]
3	(Paraguay) V Cepede Royg (Brazil) PC Gonçalves	6^{4}	6	[10]
(Israel) D Khazaniuk (United States) M Oudin	6^{3}	6	[1]
2	(Netherlands) D Schuurs (Czech Republic) R Voráčová	7^{7}	3	[10]

Semifinals
(Australia) J Moore (India) P Thombare	7	1	[7]
(Germany) N Geuer (Switzerland) V Golubic	5	6	[10]
3	(Paraguay) V Cepede Royg (Brazil) PC Gonçalves	6^{1}	6^{1}
2	(Netherlands) D Schuurs (Czech Republic) R Voráčová	7^{7}	7^{7}

Final
(Germany) N Geuer (Switzerland) V Golubic	1	2
2	(Netherlands) D Schuurs (Czech Republic) R Voráčová	6	6
