= 2012 President's Cup – Women's singles =

Women's singles
- 2012 President's Cup (tennis)

Final
- Champion: (Portugal) Maria João Koehler
- Runner-up: (Russia) Marta Sirotkina
- Score: 7–5, 6–2

Events
Singles	men	women
Doubles	men	women
- President's Cup (tennis)

The 2012 President's Cup Women's singles was a professional tennis tournament played on outdoor hard courts in Astana, Kazakhstan.

Vitalia Diatchenko would be the defending champion, but chose not to participate.

Maria João Koehler won the title defeating Marta Sirotkina in the final 7–5, 6–2.

== Seeds ==
1. (France) Stéphanie Foretz Gacon (first round)
2. (Kazakhstan) Sesil Karatantcheva (withdrew)
3. (Kazakhstan) Yulia Putintseva (second round)
4. (Germany) Dinah Pfizenmaier (quarterfinals)
5. (Japan) Kurumi Nara (first round)
6. (Russia) Ekaterina Bychkova (quarterfinals)
7. (Portugal) Maria João Koehler (champion)
8. (Russia) Marta Sirotkina (final)

== Draw ==
Key

- Q = Qualifier
- WC = Wild card
- LL = Lucky loser
- Alt = Alternate
- ITF = ITF entry
- PR = Protected ranking
- SR = Special ranking
- SE = Special exempt
- JE = Junior exempt
- JR = Junior Accelerator Programme entrant
- CO = College Accelerator Programme entrant
- NG = Next Gen Accelerator Program entrant
- w/o = Walkover
- r = Retired
- d = Defaulted

=== Finals ===
Semifinals
LL	(Poland) Paula Kania	1	2
7	(Portugal) Maria João Koehler	6	6
Q	(Georgia (country)) Sofia Shapatava	2	0
8	(Russia) Marta Sirotkina	6	6

Final
7	(Portugal) Maria João Koehler	7	6
8	(Russia) Marta Sirotkina	5	2

=== Top half ===
First round
1	(France) S Foretz Gacon	6	6^{4}	3
LL	(Poland) P Kania	3	7^{7}	6
(Hong Kong) L Zhang	6	7
(Ukraine) V Kapshay	2	5
WC	(Kazakhstan) A Danilina	4	7^{7}	6
(South Korea) S-h Han	6	6^{3}	2
LL	(Russia) A Artamonova	3	1
6	(Russia) E Bychkova	6	6
3	(Kazakhstan) Y Putintseva	6	6
(Russia) E Ivanova	3	0
(Turkey) Ç Büyükakçay	6	6
SR	(Georgia (country)) O Kalashnikova	4	4
(Thailand) N Luangnam	2	3
Q	(Russia) K Lykina	6	6
(Thailand) V Wongteanchai	4	2
7	(Portugal) MJ Koehler	6	6

Second round
LL	(Poland) P Kania	6	3	6
(Hong Kong) L Zhang	1	6	4
WC	(Kazakhstan) A Danilina	4	0
6	(Russia) E Bychkova	6	6
3	(Kazakhstan) Y Putintseva	5	6^{6}
(Turkey) Ç Büyükakçay	7	7^{8}
Q	(Russia) K Lykina	6	4	6^{1}
7	(Portugal) MJ Koehler	4	6	7^{7}

Quarterfinals
LL	(Poland) P Kania	6	6
6	(Russia) E Bychkova	3	1
(Turkey) Ç Büyükakçay	3	4
7	(Portugal) MJ Koehler	6	6

Semifinals
LL	(Poland) P Kania	1	2
7	(Portugal) MJ Koehler	6	6

=== Bottom half ===
First round
5	(Japan) K Nara	5	2
Q	(Georgia (country)) S Shapatava	7	6
(Ukraine) L Kichenok	6	6
WC	(Kazakhstan) E Klyueva	0	0
(Bulgaria) A Naydenova	0	0
SR	(Kyrgyzstan) K Palkina	6	6
WC	(Kazakhstan) A Yepisheva	1	2
4	(Germany) D Pfizenmaier	6	6
8	(Russia) M Sirotkina	4	7	6
LL	(Ukraine) N Kichenok	6	5	3
(Lithuania) L Stančiūtė	6	2	6
LL	(Belarus) S Pirazhenka	2	6	3
Q	(Thailand) L Kumkhum	6	6
(Ukraine) V Ivakhnenko	1	1
(Germany) K Wörle	4	3
Q	(China) S Sun	6	6

Second round
Q	(Georgia (country)) S Shapatava	6	6
(Ukraine) L Kichenok	3	4
SR	(Kyrgyzstan) K Palkina	7	6^{3}	2
4	(Germany) D Pfizenmaier	5	7^{7}	6
8	(Russia) M Sirotkina	6	7^{7}
(Lithuania) L Stančiūtė	2	6^{5}
Q	(Thailand) L Kumkhum	6	6^{4}	6
Q	(China) S Sun	2	7^{7}	4

Quarterfinals
Q	(Georgia (country)) S Shapatava	6	7^{7}
4	(Germany) D Pfizenmaier	4	6^{5}
8	(Russia) M Sirotkina	6	6
Q	(Thailand) L Kumkhum	4	2

Semifinals
Q	(Georgia (country)) S Shapatava	2	0
8	(Russia) M Sirotkina	6	6
