= 2013 Open Saint-Gaudens Midi-Pyrénées – Singles =

Singles
- 2013 Open Saint-Gaudens Midi-Pyrénées

Final
- Champion: (Argentina) Paula Ormaechea
- Runner-up: (Germany) Dinah Pfizenmaier
- Score: 6–3, 3–6, 6–4

Events
Singles	Doubles
← 2012 ·	Open Saint-Gaudens Midi-Pyrénées	· 2014 →

Mariana Duque was the defending champion, having won the event in 2012, but decided not to defend her title.

Paula Ormaechea won the title, defeating Dinah Pfizenmaier in the final, 6–3, 3–6, 6–4.

== Seeds ==
1. (Netherlands) Arantxa Rus (first round)
2. (Chinese Taipei) Chang Kai-chen (first round)
3. (United States) Jessica Pegula (withdrew)
4. (Canada) Sharon Fichman (quarterfinals)
5. (Brazil) Teliana Pereira (quarterfinals)
6. (United States) Vania King (semifinals)
7. (Slovenia) Polona Hercog (second round)
8. (France) Claire Feuerstein (semifinals)

== Main draw ==
=== Key ===
- Q = Qualifier
- WC = Wild card
- LL = Lucky loser
- Alt = Alternate
- SE = Special exempt
- PR = Protected ranking
- ITF = ITF entry
- JE = Junior exempt
- w/o = Walkover
- r = Retired
- d = Defaulted
- SR = Special ranking

=== Finals ===
Semifinals
(Argentina) Paula Ormaechea	6	6
6	(United States) Vania King	3	1
(Germany) Dinah Pfizenmaier	5	6	7^{7}
8	(France) Claire Feuerstein	7	4	6^{2}

Final
(Argentina) Paula Ormaechea	6	3	6
(Germany) Dinah Pfizenmaier	3	6	4

=== Top half ===
First round
1	(Netherlands) A Rus	3	4
(Russia) E Bychkova	6	6
(Slovenia) T Majerič	2	6^{2}
(Argentina) P Ormaechea	6	7^{7}
Q	(United Kingdom) E Baltacha	2	6	6
SE	(Ukraine) M Zanevska	6	3	1
WC	(Israel) D Khazaniuk	2	1
5	(Brazil) T Pereira	6	6
4	(Canada) S Fichman	7	6
(Turkey) Ç Büyükakçay	5	0
Q	(Belgium) A Van Uytvanck	6	7^{7}
(Russia) D Gavrilova	1	6^{2}
WC	(France) A Lim	6	6
(United States) G Min	0	3
LL	(France) S Beltrame	4	3
6	(United States) V King	6	6

Second round
(Russia) E Bychkova	3	6^{3}
(Argentina) P Ormaechea	6	7^{7}
Q	(United Kingdom) E Baltacha	4	6^{4}
5	(Brazil) T Pereira	6	7^{7}
4	(Canada) S Fichman	6	6
Q	(Belgium) A Van Uytvanck	3	4
WC	(France) A Lim	2	5
6	(United States) V King	6	7

Quarterfinals
(Argentina) P Ormaechea	6^{4}	6	6
5	(Brazil) T Pereira	7^{7}	2	2
4	(Canada) S Fichman	6	4	6^{5}
6	(United States) V King	2	6	7^{7}

Semifinals
(Argentina) P Ormaechea	6	6
6	(United States) V King	3	1

=== Bottom half ===
First round
7	(Slovenia) P Hercog	6	6
WC	(France) V Larrière	0	2
(Japan) K Nara	6	2	3
Q	(Germany) A-L Friedsam	3	6	6
WC	(France) A Rezaï	1	1^{r}
(Germany) D Pfizenmaier	6	3
(Canada) S Dubois	6	2	6^{5}
LL	(Russia) Y Kalabina	4	6	7^{7}
8	(France) C Feuerstein	6	6
(France) J Coin	2	0
(Russia) A Panova	6^{4}	6	6
Q	(France) M Georges	7^{7}	3	4
(Israel) J Glushko	6	3	4
(Russia) V Solovyeva	4	6	6
(France) I Pavlovic	6	7^{7}
2	(Chinese Taipei) K-c Chang	4	6^{5}

Second round
7	(Slovenia) P Hercog	6	0	5
Q	(Germany) A-L Friedsam	3	6	7
(Germany) D Pfizenmaier	7	6
LL	(Russia) Y Kalabina	5	2
8	(France) C Feuerstein	6	6
(Russia) A Panova	1	1
(Russia) V Solovyeva	7	0
(France) I Pavlovic	5	0^{r}

Quarterfinals
Q	(Germany) A-L Friedsam	6^{2}	1
(Germany) D Pfizenmaier	7^{7}	6
8	(France) C Feuerstein	7	6
(Russia) V Solovyeva	5	3

Semifinals
(Germany) D Pfizenmaier	5	6	7^{7}
8	(France) C Feuerstein	7	4	6^{2}
