= 2014 Open Saint-Gaudens Midi-Pyrénées =

- Date: 12–18 May
- Edition: 18th
- Category: ITF Women's Circuit
- Prize money: $50,000+H
- Surface: Clay
- Location: Saint-Gaudens, Haute-Garonne, France

Champions

Singles
- (Montenegro) Danka Kovinić

Doubles
- (Paraguay) Verónica Cepede Royg / (Argentina) María Irigoyen
← 2013 ·	Open Saint-Gaudens Midi-Pyrénées	· 2015 →

The 2014 Open Saint-Gaudens Midi-Pyrénées was a professional tennis tournament played on outdoor clay courts. It was the eighteenth edition of the tournament and part of the 2014 ITF Women's Circuit, offering a total of $50,000+H in prize money. It took place in Saint-Gaudens, Haute-Garonne, France, on 12–18 May 2014.

== Singles main draw entrants ==
=== Seeds ===
Country	Player	Rank^{1}	Seed
CAN	Sharon Fichman	90	1
GBR	Johanna Konta	114	2
UKR	Maryna Zanevska	123	3
FRA	Claire Feuerstein	124	4
MNE	Danka Kovinić	133	5
ROU	Alexandra Dulgheru	139	6
PAR	Verónica Cepede Royg	140	7
TUR	Çağla Büyükakçay	149	8

- ^{1} Rankings as of 5 May 2014

=== Other entrants ===
The following players received wildcards into the singles main draw:

- (France) Amandine Hesse
- (France) Stéphanie Foretz Gacon
- (Israel) Deniz Khazaniuk
- (France) Jade Suvrijn

The following players received entry from the qualifying draw:

- (Uzbekistan) Nigina Abduraimova
- (Peru) Bianca Botto
- (France) Fiona Ferro
- (Georgia (country)) Ekaterine Gorgodze

The following player received entry into the singles main draw as a lucky loser:

- (France) Myrtille Georges

The following player received entry with a junior exempt:

- (Croatia) Ana Konjuh

== Champions ==
=== Singles ===
- (Montenegro) Danka Kovinić def. (France) Pauline Parmentier 6–1, 6–2

=== Doubles ===
- (Paraguay) Verónica Cepede Royg / (Argentina) María Irigoyen def. (Canada) Sharon Fichman / (United Kingdom) Johanna Konta 7–5, 6–3
