= 2013 Open Saint-Gaudens Midi-Pyrénées – Doubles =

Doubles
- 2013 Open Saint-Gaudens Midi-Pyrénées

Final
- Champions: (Israel) Julia Glushko (Argentina) Paula Ormaechea
- Runners-up: (Canada) Stéphanie Dubois (Japan) Kurumi Nara
- Score: 7–5, 7–6^{(13–11)}

Events
| Singles | Doubles |
| ← 2012 · | Open Saint-Gaudens Midi-Pyrénées | · 2014 → |

Vesna Dolonc and Irina Khromacheva were the defending champions, having won the event in 2012, but both players chose not to defend their title. Dolonc played instead at the 2013 Sparta Prague Open.

Julia Glushko and Paula Ormaechea won the title, defeating Stéphanie Dubois and Kurumi Nara in the final, 7–5, 7–6^{(13–11)}.

== Seeds ==
1. (Spain) Inés Ferrer Suárez / (Brazil) Teliana Pereira (semifinals)
2. (Canada) Sharon Fichman / (United States) Jessica Pegula (withdrew)
3. (Russia) Valeria Solovyeva / (Ukraine) Maryna Zanevska (quarterfinals; retired)
4. (Israel) Julia Glushko / (Argentina) Paula Ormaechea (champions)

== Draw ==
=== Key ===
- Q = Qualifier
- WC = Wild card
- LL = Lucky loser
- Alt = Alternate
- SE = Special exempt
- PR = Protected ranking
- ITF = ITF entry
- JE = Junior exempt
- w/o = Walkover
- r = Retired
- d = Defaulted
- SR = Special ranking

First round
(France) A Hesse (France) I Ramialison | 7 | 6
(Russia) E Bychkova (Russia) M Kondratieva | 5 | 4
4 | (Israel) J Glushko (Argentina) P Ormaechea | 6 | 6
(Russia) J Kushnereva (Russia) S Patakhonova | 0 | 0
(Turkey) Ç Büyükakçay (Germany) A-L Friedsam | 5 | 7^{7} | [7]
(Italy) N Clerico (Czech Republic) N Fraňková | 7 | 6^{5} | [10]
(Canada) S Dubois (Japan) K Nara | 6 | 6
(France) C Feuerstein (France) V Larrière | 2 | 2
(France) S Benamar (France) C Sibille | 6 | 2 | [7]
(France) A Lim (France) A Rezaï | 3 | 6 | [10]

Quarterfinals
1 | (Spain) I Ferrer Suárez (Brazil) T Pereira | 4 | 6 | [10]
(France) A Hesse (France) I Ramialison | 6 | 0 | [7]
4 | (Israel) J Glushko (Argentina) P Ormaechea | 7^{7} | 7^{7}
(Italy) N Clerico (Czech Republic) N Fraňková | 6^{5} | 6^{4}
(Canada) S Dubois (Japan) K Nara | 2
3 | (Russia) V Solovyeva (Ukraine) M Zanevska | 0^{r}
(France) A Lim (France) A Rezaï | w/o
2 | (Canada) S Fichman (United States) J Pegula

Semifinals
1 | (Spain) I Ferrer Suárez (Brazil) T Pereira | 4 | 6 | [10]
4 | (Israel) J Glushko (Argentina) P Ormaechea | 6 | 2 | [12]
(Canada) S Dubois (Japan) K Nara | w/o
(France) A Lim (France) A Rezaï

Final
4 | (Israel) J Glushko (Argentina) P Ormaechea | 7 | 7^{13}
(Canada) S Dubois (Japan) K Nara | 5 | 6^{11}
