= 2011 Open GDF Suez – Singles qualifying =

This article displays the qualifying draw of the 2011 Open GDF Suez.

== Players ==
=== Seeds ===
1. (Czech Republic) Sandra Záhlavová (second round)
2. (Russia) Vesna Manasieva (qualified)
3. (Italy) Maria Elena Camerin (second round)
4. (Australia) Jelena Dokic (qualified)
5. (Belarus) Darya Kustova (first round)
6. (Russia) Ekaterina Bychkova (first round)
7. (France) Stéphanie Cohen-Aloro (qualifying competition, lucky loser)
8. (France) Anaïs Laurendon (withdrew)

=== Qualifiers ===
1. (Slovakia) Kristína Kučová
2. (Russia) Vesna Manasieva
3. (Croatia) Ana Vrljić
4. (Australia) Jelena Dokic

=== Lucky losers ===
1. (France) Stéphanie Cohen-Aloro

== Qualifying draw ==
=== First qualifier ===
First round
1	(Czech Republic) Sandra Záhlavová	7	7
(France) Nathalie Piquion	6^{1}	5
(Slovakia) Kristína Kučová	6	6
(Germany) Julia Schruff	4	2
(Georgia (country)) Margalita Chakhnashvili	4	2
(France) Séverine Beltrame	6	6
(Belarus) Iryna Kuryanovich	6	6
5	(Belarus) Darya Kustova	2	0

Second round
1	(Czech Republic) Sandra Záhlavová	5	4
(Slovakia) Kristína Kučová	7	6
(France) Séverine Beltrame	2	6^{8}
(Belarus) Iryna Kuryanovich	6	7

Qualifying competition
(Slovakia) Kristína Kučová	2	6	6
(Belarus) Iryna Kuryanovich	6	4	4

=== Second qualifier ===
First round
2	(Russia) Vesna Manasieva	7	3	6
(France) Audrey Bergot	6^{4}	6	2
(Austria) Tina Schiechtl	1	0^{r}
(France) Alizé Lim	6	0
(Finland) Emma Laine	6	6
(United States) Abigail Spears	4	1
(Ukraine) Veronika Kapshay	6^{7}	2
WC	(Tunisia) Selima Sfar	7	6

Second round
2	(Russia) Vesna Manasieva	6	7
(France) Alizé Lim	4	6^{5}
(Finland) Emma Laine	6^{5}	7	6
WC	(Tunisia) Selima Sfar	7	6^{0}	4

Qualifying competition
2	(Russia) Vesna Manasieva	7	6
(Finland) Emma Laine	6^{3}	2

=== Third qualifier ===
First round
3	(Italy) Maria Elena Camerin	6	6
WC	(France) Myrtille Georges	3	3
WC	(France) Estelle Guisard	3	0
(Croatia) Ana Vrljić	6	6
(Croatia) Ivana Lisjak	4	7	4
(Austria) Nikola Hofmanova	6	5	6
(Ukraine) Maryna Zanevska	3	6	4
7	(France) Stéphanie Cohen-Aloro	6	3	6

Second round
3	(Italy) Maria Elena Camerin	1	4
(Croatia) Ana Vrljić	6	6
(Austria) Nikola Hofmanova	3	3
7	(France) Stéphanie Cohen-Aloro	6	6

Qualifying competition
(Croatia) Ana Vrljić	6	6
7	(France) Stéphanie Cohen-Aloro	2	4

=== Fourth qualifier ===
First round
4	(Australia) Jelena Dokic	4	6	6
WC	(Ukraine) Elina Svitolina	6	0	3
(Georgia (country)) Sofia Shapatava	1	3
(Slovakia) Lenka Juríková	6	6
WC	(France) Chloé Paquet	3	5
(Slovakia) Michaela Pochabová	6	7
WC	(France) Elixane Lechemia	6	3	6
6	(Russia) Ekaterina Bychkova	3	6	4

Second round
4	(Australia) Jelena Dokic	6	6
(Slovakia) Lenka Juríková	2	1
(Slovakia) Michaela Pochabová	5	1
WC	(France) Elixane Lechemia	7	6

Qualifying competition
4	(Australia) Jelena Dokic	6	6
WC	(France) Elixane Lechemia	4	4
