= 2012 President's Cup (tennis) =

- Date: July 23–29
- Edition: 6th (men) / 4th (women)
- Surface: Hard
- Location: Astana, Kazakhstan

Champions

Men's singles
- (Russia) Evgeny Donskoy

Women's singles
- (Portugal) Maria João Koehler

Men's doubles
- (Russia) Konstantin Kravchuk / (Ukraine) Denys Molchanov

Women's doubles
- (Georgia (country)) Oksana Kalashnikova / (Russia) Marta Sirotkina
- President's Cup (tennis)

The 2012 President's Cup was a professional tennis tournament played on outdoor hard courts. It was the sixth edition of the tournament for men and the 4th edition for women, and is part of the 2012 ATP Challenger Tour and the 2012 ITF Women's Circuit. It took place in Astana, Kazakhstan between 23 and 29 July 2012.

== ATP singles main-draw entrants ==
=== Seeds ===
| Country | Player | Rank^{1} | Seed |
|---|---|---|---|
| GER | Cedrik-Marcel Stebe | 83 | 1 |
| SVK | Karol Beck | 103 | 2 |
| KAZ | Andrey Golubev | 145 | 3 |
| TUR | Marsel İlhan | 160 | 4 |
| RUS | Evgeny Donskoy | 199 | 5 |
| RUS | Konstantin Kravchuk | 207 | 6 |
| IND | Yuki Bhambri | 218 | 7 |
| SVK | Kamil Čapkovič | 226 | 8 |

- ^{1} Rankings are as of July 16, 2012.

=== Other entrants ===
The following players received wildcards into the singles main draw:

- (Kazakhstan) Alexey Kedryuk
- (Kazakhstan) Serizhan Yessenbekov
- (Kazakhstan) Denis Yevseyev

The following players received entry from the qualifying draw:

- (Uzbekistan) Sarvar Ikramov
- (Belarus) Dzmitry Zhyrmont
- (Israel) Tal Eros
- (Belarus) Yaraslav Shyla

The following players received entry as a lucky loser:

- (Kyrgyzstan) Daniiar Duldaev

== WTA singles main-draw entrants ==
=== Seeds ===
| Country | Player | Rank^{1} | Seed |
|---|---|---|---|
| FRA | Stéphanie Foretz Gacon | 82 | 1 |
| KAZ | Sesil Karatantcheva | 105 | 2 |
| KAZ | Yulia Putintseva | 120 | 3 |
| GER | Dinah Pfizenmaier | 129 | 4 |
| JPN | Kurumi Nara | 151 | 5 |
| RUS | Ekaterina Bychkova | 163 | 6 |
| POR | Maria João Koehler | 176 | 7 |
| RUS | Marta Sirotkina | 183 | 8 |

- Rankings are as of July 16, 2012.

=== Other entrants ===
The following players received wildcards into the singles main draw:

- (Kazakhstan) Anna Danilina
- (Kazakhstan) Ekaterina Klyueva
- (Kazakhstan) Anastasiya Yepisheva

The following players received entry from the qualifying draw:

- (Thailand) Luksika Kumkhum
- (Russia) Ksenia Lykina
- (Georgia (country)) Sofia Shapatava
- (China) Sun Shengnan

The following players received entry by a lucky loser spot:

- (Russia) Alexandra Artamonova
- (Poland) Paula Kania
- (Ukraine) Nadiia Kichenok
- (Belarus) Sviatlana Pirazhenka

== Champions ==
=== Men's singles ===
- (Russia) Evgeny Donskoy def. (Turkey) Marsel İlhan, 6–3, 6–4

=== Women's singles ===
- (Portugal) Maria João Koehler def. (Russia) Marta Sirotkina, 7–5, 6–2

=== Men's doubles ===
- (Russia) Konstantin Kravchuk / (Ukraine) Denys Molchanov def. (Slovakia) Karol Beck / (Slovakia) Kamil Čapkovič, 6–4, 6–3

=== Women's doubles ===
- (Georgia (country)) Oksana Kalashnikova / (Russia) Marta Sirotkina def. (Ukraine) Lyudmyla Kichenok / (Ukraine) Nadiia Kichenok, 3–6, 6–4, [10–2]
