= 2014 Open Saint-Gaudens Midi-Pyrénées – Doubles =

Doubles
- 2014 Open Saint-Gaudens Midi-Pyrénées

Final
- Champions: (Paraguay) Verónica Cepede Royg (Argentina) María Irigoyen
- Runners-up: (Canada) Sharon Fichman (United Kingdom) Johanna Konta
- Score: 7–5, 6–3

Events
Singles	Doubles
← 2013 ·	Open Saint-Gaudens Midi-Pyrénées	· 2015 →

Julia Glushko and Paula Ormaechea were the defending champions, having won the event in 2013, but both players chose to participate at the Internazionali BNL d'Italia instead.

Verónica Cepede Royg and María Irigoyen won the title, defeating Sharon Fichman and Johanna Konta in the final, 7–5, 6–3.

== Seeds ==
1. (Paraguay) Verónica Cepede Royg / (Argentina) María Irigoyen (champions)
2. (Ukraine) Lyudmyla Kichenok / (Ukraine) Kateryna Kozlova (quarterfinals)
3. (France) Stéphanie Foretz Gacon / (France) Amandine Hesse (first round)
4. (Georgia (country)) Sofia Shapatava / (Ukraine) Anastasiya Vasylyeva (quarterfinals)

== Draw ==
=== Key ===
- Q = Qualifier
- WC = Wild card
- LL = Lucky loser
- Alt = Alternate
- SE = Special exempt
- PR = Protected ranking
- ITF = ITF entry
- JE = Junior exempt
- w/o = Walkover
- r = Retired
- d = Defaulted
- SR = Special ranking

First round
(Ukraine) A Fomina (Czech Republic) N Fraňková	4	6	[10]
WC	(Romania) A Dulgheru (Italy) G Sanesi	6	4	[4]
4	(Georgia (country)) S Shapatava (Ukraine) A Vasylyeva	6	5	[10]
(Chile) C Costa Melgar (Georgia (country)) E Gorgodze	0	7	[4]
(United Kingdom) N Slater (Australia) K Wlodarczak	6	6
WC	(Israel) D Khazaniuk (France) J Suvrijn	4	2
(France) C Sibille (China) Y Xu	5	6	[4]
(United States) A Kiick (United States) N Pluskota	7	3	[10]
(Canada) S Fichman (United Kingdom) J Konta	6	3	[11]
3	(France) S Foretz Gacon (France) A Hesse	4	6	[9]
(Italy) A Brianti (Spain) I Ferrer Suárez	0	3
(Argentina) T Búa (Chile) D Seguel	6	6
(Montenegro) D Kovinić (Brazil) L Pigossi	1	7^{7}	[7]
2	(Ukraine) L Kichenok (Ukraine) K Kozlova	6	6^{4}	[10]

Quarterfinals
1	(Paraguay) V Cepede Royg (Argentina) M Irigoyen	6	6
(Ukraine) A Fomina (Czech Republic) N Fraňková	3	4
4	(Georgia (country)) S Shapatava (Ukraine) A Vasylyeva	3	2
(United Kingdom) N Slater (Australia) K Wlodarczak	6	6
(United States) A Kiick (United States) N Pluskota	2	4
(Canada) S Fichman (United Kingdom) J Konta	6	6
(Argentina) T Búa (Chile) D Seguel	7	7^{7}
2	(Ukraine) L Kichenok (Ukraine) K Kozlova	5	6^{5}

Semifinals
1	(Paraguay) V Cepede Royg (Argentina) M Irigoyen	6	6
(United Kingdom) N Slater (Australia) K Wlodarczak	2	3
(Canada) S Fichman (United Kingdom) J Konta	6	6
(Argentina) T Búa (Chile) D Seguel	4	4

Final
1	(Paraguay) V Cepede Royg (Argentina) M Irigoyen	7	6
(Canada) S Fichman (United Kingdom) J Konta	5	3
