= 2012 President's Cup – Men's singles =

Men's singles
- 2012 President's Cup (tennis)

Final
- Champion: (Russia) Evgeny Donskoy
- Runner-up: (Turkey) Marsel İlhan
- Score: 6–3, 6–4

Events
Singles	men	women
Doubles	men	women
- President's Cup (tennis)

Mikhail Kukushkin was the defending champion but decided not to participate.
Evgeny Donskoy won the title, defeating Marsel İlhan 6–3, 6–4 in the final.

== Seeds ==
1. (Germany) Cedrik-Marcel Stebe (second round)
2. (Slovakia) Karol Beck (semifinals)
3. (Kazakhstan) Andrey Golubev (second round)
4. (Turkey) Marsel İlhan (final)
5. (Russia) Evgeny Donskoy (champion)
6. (Russia) Konstantin Kravchuk (first round)
7. (India) Yuki Bhambri (quarterfinals)
8. (Slovakia) Kamil Čapkovič (first round)

== Draw ==
Key

- Q = Qualifier
- WC = Wild card
- LL = Lucky loser
- Alt = Alternate
- ITF = ITF entry
- PR = Protected ranking
- SR = Special ranking
- SE = Special exempt
- JE = Junior exempt
- JR = Junior Accelerator Programme entrant
- CO = College Accelerator Programme entrant
- NG = Next Gen Accelerator Program entrant
- w/o = Walkover
- r = Retired
- d = Defaulted

=== Finals ===
Semifinals
5	(Russia) Evgeny Donskoy	6	6
(Australia) Brydan Klein	3	4
4	(Turkey) Marsel İlhan	6	6
2	(Slovakia) Karol Beck	2	4

Final
5	(Russia) Evgeny Donskoy	6	6
4	(Turkey) Marsel İlhan	3	4

=== Top half ===
First round
1	(Germany) C-M Stebe	6	7^{7}
(Croatia) N Mektić	3	6^{4}
(France) F Martin	4	6^{4}
(Ukraine) O Nedovyesov	6	7^{7}
Q	(Uzbekistan) S Ikramov	6	4	1
(Russia) A Kumantsov	3	6	6
(Switzerland) S Bohli	7^{7}	3	4
5	(Russia) E Donskoy	6^{4}	6	6
3	(Kazakhstan) A Golubev	6	7
(Russia) E Kirillov	4	5
(Australia) B Klein	6	6
Q	(Belarus) D Zhyrmont	2	3
(Kazakhstan) Y Schukin	6	6
LL	(Kyrgyzstan) D Duldaev	1	0
(Ukraine) I Marchenko	7	6
8	(Slovakia) K Čapkovič	5	2

Second round
1	(Germany) C-M Stebe	6^{4}	7	4
(Ukraine) O Nedovyesov	7^{7}	5	6
(Russia) A Kumantsov	6	4	0^{r}
5	(Russia) E Donskoy	1	6	1
3	(Kazakhstan) A Golubev	6^{3}	3
(Australia) B Klein	7^{7}	6
(Kazakhstan) Y Schukin	6	3	1
(Ukraine) I Marchenko	3	6	6

Quarterfinals
(Ukraine) O Nedovyesov	7^{7}	4	4
5	(Russia) E Donskoy	6^{6}	6	6
(Australia) B Klein	4	6	7
(Ukraine) I Marchenko	6	3	5

Semifinals
5	(Russia) E Donskoy	6	6
(Australia) B Klein	3	4

=== Bottom half ===
First round
6	(Russia) K Kravchuk	3	5
(Czech Republic) Michal Konečný	6	7
WC	(Kazakhstan) D Yevseyev	4	7	6
Q	(Israel) Tal Eros	6	5	2
Q	(Belarus) Y Shyla	6^{5}	6	6
(Croatia) T Androić	7^{7}	2	3
(Ukraine) D Molchanov	4	6^{5}
4	(Turkey) M İlhan	6	7^{7}
7	(India) Y Bhambri	6	6
WC	(Kazakhstan) Serizhan Yessenbekov	0	2
WC	(Kazakhstan) A Kedryuk	1	2
(Uzbekistan) F Dustov	6	6
(Croatia) D Marcan	6	6^{2}	6
(Russia) V Baluda	2	7^{7}	0
(Russia) D Matsukevitch	6	3	3
2	(Slovakia) K Beck	4	6	6

Second round
(Czech Republic) Michal Konečný	6	7^{8}
WC	(Kazakhstan) D Yevseyev	4	6^{6}
Q	(Belarus) Y Shyla	4	6^{3}
4	(Turkey) M İlhan	6	7^{7}
7	(India) Y Bhambri	6	7
(Uzbekistan) F Dustov	3	5
(Croatia) D Marcan	4	4
2	(Slovakia) K Beck	6	6

Quarterfinals
(Czech Republic) Michal Konečný	2	5
4	(Turkey) M İlhan	6	7
7	(India) Y Bhambri	2	6^{3}
2	(Slovakia) K Beck	6	7^{7}

Semifinals
4	(Turkey) M İlhan	6	6
2	(Slovakia) K Beck	2	4
