= 2012 Aegon GB Pro-Series Barnstaple =

- Date: 29 October–4 November
- Edition: 5th
- Surface: Hard (indoor)
- Location: Barnstaple, England

Champions

Singles
- (Germany) Annika Beck

Doubles
- (Uzbekistan) Akgul Amanmuradova / (Serbia) Vesna Dolonc
- Aegon GB Pro-Series Barnstaple

The 2012 Aegon GB Pro-Series Barnstaple was a professional tennis tournament played on indoor hard courts. It was the fifth edition of the tournament which was part of the 2012 ITF Women's Circuit. It took place in Barnstaple, England, on 29 October–4 November 2012.

== WTA entrants ==
=== Seeds ===
Country	Player	Rank^{1}	Seed
SUI	Romina Oprandi	58	1
RUS	Nina Bratchikova	89	2
GBR	Anne Keothavong	99	3
SVK	Jana Čepelová	107	4
GER	Annika Beck	112	5
GRE	Eleni Daniilidou	119	6
POR	Maria João Koehler	124	7
SRB	Vesna Dolonc	127	8

- ^{1} Rankings are as of 22 October 2012.

=== Other entrants ===
The following players received wildcards into the singles main draw:

- (United Kingdom) Sabrina Bamburac
- (United Kingdom) Laura Deigman
- (United Kingdom) Amanda Elliott
- (United Kingdom) Emily Webley-Smith

The following players received entry from the qualifying draw:

- (Denmark) Karen Barbat
- (Russia) Mayya Katsitadze
- (France) Constance Sibille
- (Czech Republic) Kateřina Vaňková

== Champions ==
=== Singles ===
- (Germany) Annika Beck def. (Greece) Eleni Daniilidou 6–7^{(1–7)}, 6–2, 6–2

=== Doubles ===
- (Uzbekistan) Akgul Amanmuradova / (Serbia) Vesna Dolonc def. (Latvia) Diāna Marcinkēviča / (Belarus) Aliaksandra Sasnovich 6–3, 6–1
