= 2012 President's Cup – Men's doubles =

Men's doubles
- 2012 President's Cup (tennis)

Final
- Champions: (Russia) Konstantin Kravchuk (Ukraine) Denys Molchanov
- Runners-up: (Slovakia) Karol Beck (Slovakia) Kamil Čapkovič
- Score: 6–4, 6–3

Events
Singles	men	women
Doubles	men	women
- President's Cup (tennis)

Konstantin Kravchuk and Denys Molchanov successfully defended their title, defeating Karol Beck and Kamil Čapkovič 6–4, 6–3 in the final.

== Seeds ==
1. (Russia) Konstantin Kravchuk / (Ukraine) Denys Molchanov (champions)
2. (Kazakhstan) Andrey Golubev / (Kazakhstan) Yuri Schukin (quarterfinals)
3. (India) Yuki Bhambri / (India) Divij Sharan (semifinals)
4. (Republic of Ireland) James Cluskey / (France) Fabrice Martin (semifinals)

== Draw ==
Key

- Q = Qualifier
- WC = Wild card
- LL = Lucky loser
- Alt = Alternate
- ITF = ITF entry
- PR = Protected ranking
- SR = Special ranking
- SE = Special exempt
- JE = Junior exempt
- JR = Junior Accelerator Programme entrant
- CO = College Accelerator Programme entrant
- NG = Next Gen Accelerator Program entrant
- w/o = Walkover
- r = Retired
- d = Defaulted

=== Draw ===
First round
1	(Russia) K Kravchuk (Ukraine) D Molchanov	6	6
WC	(Kazakhstan) Danjil Braun (Kazakhstan) Kairat Kosherov	0	1
(Czech Republic) Michal Konečný (Russia) A Kumantsov	7	6^{5}	[7]
(Croatia) D Marcan (Croatia) N Mektić	5	7^{7}	[10]
4	(Republic of Ireland) J CLuskey (France) F Martin	6	7^{7}
(Kazakhstan) A Kedryuk (Kazakhstan) Sergei Krotiouk	3	6^{1}
Alt	(Belarus) Y Shyla (Belarus) D Zhyrmont	6	3	[10]
(Croatia) T Androić (Russia) Vitaliy Kachanovskiy	4	6	[8]
(Turkey) M İlhan (Russia) D Matsukevitch	w/o
(Russia) E Donskoy (Russia) E Kirillov
(Belarus) E Gerasimov (Kazakhstan) D Yevseyev	4	6^{2}
3	(India) Y Bhambri (India) D Sharan	6	7^{7}
(Slovakia) K Beck (Slovakia) K Čapkovič	7^{7}	6
(Australia) B Klein (Ukraine) O Nedovyesov	6^{2}	3
WC	(Kazakhstan) S Abdukhalikov (Kazakhstan) Kaysar Bekimov	0	0
2	(Kazakhstan) A Golubev (Kazakhstan) Y Schukin	6	6

Quarterfinals
1	(Russia) K Kravchuk (Ukraine) D Molchanov	6	1	[10]
(Croatia) D Marcan (Croatia) N Mektić	4	6	[3]
4	(Republic of Ireland) J Cluskey (France) F Martin	4	6	[10]
Alt	(Belarus) Y Shyla (Belarus) D Zhyrmont	6	4	[8]
(Turkey) M İlhan (Russia) D Matsukevitch	4	4
3	(India) Y Bhambri (India) D Sharan	6	6
(Slovakia) K Beck (Slovakia) K Čapkovič	4	7^{7}	[10]
2	(Kazakhstan) A Golubev (Kazakhstan) Y Schukin	6	6^{2}	[6]

Semifinals
1	(Russia) K Kravchuk (Ukraine) D Molchanov	6	3	[10]
4	(Republic of Ireland) J Cluskey (France) F Martin	3	6	[4]
3	(India) Y Bhambri (India) D Sharan	3	4
(Slovakia) K Beck (Slovakia) K Čapkovič	6	6

Final
1	(Russia) K Kravchuk (Ukraine) D Molchanov	6	6
(Slovakia) K Beck (Slovakia) K Čapkovič	4	3
