= 2016 Open Engie Saint-Gaudens Midi-Pyrénées =

- Date: 9–15 May
- Edition: 20th
- Category: ITF Women's Circuit
- Prize money: $50,000+H
- Surface: Clay
- Location: Saint-Gaudens, France

Champions

Singles
- (Russia) Irina Khromacheva

Doubles
- (Netherlands) Demi Schuurs / (Czech Republic) Renata Voráčová
← 2015 ·	Open Engie Saint-Gaudens Midi-Pyrénées	· 2017 →

The 2016 Open Engie Saint-Gaudens Midi-Pyrénées was a professional tennis tournament played on outdoor clay courts. It was the twentieth edition of the tournament and part of the 2016 ITF Women's Circuit, offering a total of $50,000+H in prize money. It took place in Saint-Gaudens, France, on 9–15 May 2016.

== Singles main draw entrants ==
=== Seeds ===
Country	Player	Rank^{1}	Seed
ESP	Lourdes Domínguez Lino	111	1
GRE	Maria Sakkari	117	2
AUT	Tamira Paszek	124	3
SUI	Viktorija Golubic	132	4
~~SUI~~	~~Romina Oprandi~~	~~138~~	~~5~~
JPN	Miyu Kato	146	6
BEL	Ysaline Bonaventure	148	7
SUI	Amra Sadiković	151	8

- ^{1} Rankings as of 2 May 2016.

=== Other entrants ===
The following players received wildcards into the singles main draw:

- (Israel) Deniz Khazaniuk
- (Spain) Ariadna Martí Riembau
- (France) Victoria Muntean
- (France) Emmanuelle Salas

The following players received entry from the qualifying draw:

- (France) Audrey Albié
- (United Kingdom) Amanda Carreras
- (Brazil) Beatriz Haddad Maia
- (Russia) Natalia Vikhlyantseva

The following player received entry by a lucky loser spot:

- (France) Manon Arcangioli
- (Czech Republic) Renata Voráčová

The following player received entry by a protected ranking:

- (United States) Melanie Oudin

== Champions ==
=== Singles ===
- (Russia) Irina Khromacheva def. (Greece) Maria Sakkari, 1–6, 7–6^{(7–3)}, 6–1

=== Doubles ===
- (Netherlands) Demi Schuurs / (Czech Republic) Renata Voráčová def. (Germany) Nicola Geuer / (Switzerland) Viktorija Golubic, 6–1, 6–2
