= 2015 Open Engie Saint-Gaudens Midi-Pyrénées – Doubles =

Doubles
- 2015 Open Engie Saint-Gaudens Midi-Pyrénées

Final
- Champions: (Colombia) Mariana Duque (Israel) Julia Glushko
- Runners-up: (Brazil) Beatriz Haddad Maia (United States) Nicole Melichar
- Score: 1–6, 7–6^{(7–5)}, [10–4]

Events
Singles	Doubles
← 2014 ·	Open Engie Saint-Gaudens Midi-Pyrénées	· 2016 →

Verónica Cepede Royg and María Irigoyen were the defending champions, but Irigoyen chose not to participate. Cepede Royg partners Danka Kovinić, but lost in the quarterfinals to Mariana Duque and Julia Glushko.

Mariana Duque and Julia Glushko won the title, defeating Beatriz Haddad Maia and Nicole Melichar in the final, 1–6, 7–6^{(7–5)}, [10–4].

== Seeds ==
1. (Chinese Taipei) Chuang Chia-jung / (China) Wang Yafan (quarterfinals)
2. (Brazil) Beatriz Haddad Maia / (United States) Nicole Melichar (finals)
3. (Slovakia) Jana Čepelová / (Georgia (country)) Oksana Kalashnikova (semifinals)
4. (Paraguay) Verónica Cepede Royg / (Montenegro) Danka Kovinić (quarterfinals)

== Draw ==
=== Key ===
- Q = Qualifier
- WC = Wild card
- LL = Lucky loser
- Alt = Alternate
- SE = Special exempt
- PR = Protected ranking
- ITF = ITF entry
- JE = Junior exempt
- w/o = Walkover
- r = Retired
- d = Defaulted
- SR = Special ranking

First round
(Canada) S Fichman (United Kingdom) J Konta	6	6
(Japan) H Kuwata (China) L Zhu	4	1
(Colombia) M Duque (Israel) J Glushko	6	6
(Russia) E Kulichkova (Austria) T Paszek	3	2
(Argentina) T Búa (Chile) D Seguel	6	4	[8]
(Denmark) K Barbat (Switzerland) L Michel	3	6	[10]
(Russia) O Doroshina (Belarus) L Marozava	5	6	[11]
(France) I Ramialison (France) C Sibille	7	2	[13]

Quarterfinals
1	(Chinese Taipei) C-j Chuang (China) Y Wang	4	2
(Canada) S Fichman (United Kingdom) J Konta	6	6
4	(Paraguay) V Cepede Royg (Montenegro) D Kovinić	1	6	[11]
(Colombia) M Duque (Israel) J Glushko	6	1	[13]
(Denmark) K Barbat (Switzerland) L Michel	3	2
3	(Slovakia) J Čepelová (Georgia (country)) O Kalashnikova	6	6
(France) I Ramialison (France) C Sibille	1	3
2	(Brazil) B Haddad Maia (United States) N Melichar	6	6

Semifinals
(Canada) S Fichman (United Kingdom) J Konta	3	4
(Colombia) M Duque (Israel) J Glushko	6	6
3	(Slovakia) J Čepelová (Georgia (country)) O Kalashnikova	5	3
2	(Brazil) B Haddad Maia (United States) N Melichar	7	6

Final
(Colombia) M Duque (Israel) J Glushko	1	7^{7}	[10]
2	(Brazil) B Haddad Maia (United States) N Melichar	6	6^{5}	[4]
