= 2012 Aegon GB Pro-Series Barnstaple – Singles =

Singles
- 2012 Aegon GB Pro-Series Barnstaple

Final
- Champion: (Germany) Annika Beck
- Runner-up: (Greece) Eleni Daniilidou
- Score: 6–7^{(1–7)}, 6–2, 6–2

Events
Singles	Doubles
- Aegon GB Pro-Series Barnstaple

Anne Keothavong was the defending champion, but lost in the second round to French qualifier Constance Sibille.

Annika Beck won the title, defeating Eleni Daniilidou in the final, 6–7^{(1–7)}, 6–2, 6–2.

== Seeds ==
1. (Switzerland) Romina Oprandi (second round)
2. (Russia) Nina Bratchikova (second round)
3. (United Kingdom) Anne Keothavong (second round)
4. (Slovakia) Jana Čepelová (first round)
5. (Germany) Annika Beck (champion)
6. (Greece) Eleni Daniilidou (final)
7. (Portugal) Maria João Koehler (second round)
8. (Serbia) Vesna Dolonc (semifinals)

== Main draw ==
Key

- Q = Qualifier
- WC = Wild card
- LL = Lucky loser
- Alt = Alternate
- ITF = ITF entry
- PR = Protected ranking
- SR = Special ranking
- SE = Special exempt
- JE = Junior exempt
- JR = Junior Accelerator Programme entrant
- CO = College Accelerator Programme entrant
- NG = Next Gen Accelerator Program entrant
- w/o = Walkover
- r = Retired
- d = Defaulted

=== Finals ===
Semifinals
6	(Greece) Eleni Daniilidou	6	6^{2}	7^{7}
8	(Serbia) Vesna Dolonc	3	7^{7}	6^{4}
Q	(France) Constance Sibille	3	1
5	(Germany) Annika Beck	6	6

Final
6	(Greece) Eleni Daniilidou	7^{7}	2	2
5	(Germany) Annika Beck	6^{1}	6	6

=== Top half ===
First round
1	(Switzerland) R Oprandi	7^{7}	6
(Kazakhstan) A Danilina	6^{3}	4
(Bulgaria) E Kostova	1	3
(United States) M Brengle	6	6
(Croatia) T Mrdeža	1	5
(Russia) E Bychkova	6	7
(Poland) M Domachowska	4	2
6	(Greece) E Daniilidou	6	6
4	(Slovakia) J Čepelová	3	6	3
(United Kingdom) T Moore	6	2	6
(United States) J Craybas	3	6	3
(Russia) M Sirotkina	6	3	6
WC	(United Kingdom) E Webley-Smith	4	1
(Netherlands) L Kerkhove	6	6
(Uzbekistan) A Amanmuradova	3	2
8	(Serbia) V Dolonc	6	6

Second round
1	(Switzerland) R Oprandi	6^{3}	1
(United States) M Brengle	7^{7}	6
(Russia) E Bychkova	7^{8}	1	4
6	(Greece) E Daniilidou	6^{6}	6	6
(United Kingdom) T Moore	2	5
(Russia) M Sirotkina	6	7
(Netherlands) L Kerkhove	4	2
8	(Serbia) V Dolonc	6	6

Quarterfinals
(United States) M Brengle	3	6	3
6	(Greece) E Daniilidou	6	2	6
(Russia) M Sirotkina	3	4
8	(Serbia) V Dolonc	6	6

Semifinals
6	(Greece) E Daniilidou	6	6^{2}	7^{7}
8	(Serbia) V Dolonc	3	7^{7}	6^{4}

=== Bottom half ===
First round
7	(Portugal) MJ Koehler	6	6
Q	(Denmark) K Barbat	2	2
WC	(United Kingdom) A Elliott	6	2	2
(Czech Republic) E Birnerová	4	6	6
WC	(United Kingdom) S Bamburac	0	3
Q	(France) C Sibille	6	6
(Latvia) D Marcinkēviča	4	4
3	(United Kingdom) A Keothavong	6	6
5	(Germany) A Beck	6	6
(United Kingdom) L Whybourn	4	2
WC	(United Kingdom) L Deigman	1	2
Q	(Czech Republic) K Vaňková	6	6
(United Kingdom) N Broady	6	6
(Lithuania) L Stančiūtė	3	3
Q	(Russia) M Katsitadze	5	2
2	(Russia) N Bratchikova	7	6

Second round
7	(Portugal) MJ Koehler	3	6	0
(Czech Republic) E Birnerová	6	3	6
Q	(France) C Sibille	3	6	7^{7}
3	(United Kingdom) A Keothavong	6	3	6^{5}
5	(Germany) A Beck	6	6
Q	(Czech Republic) K Vaňková	2	1
(United Kingdom) N Broady	4	6	6
2	(Russia) N Bratchikova	6	4	1

Quarterfinals
(Czech Republic) E Birnerová	4	4
Q	(France) C Sibille	6	6
5	(Germany) A Beck	6	7^{7}
(United Kingdom) N Broady	2	6^{2}

Semifinals
Q	(France) C Sibille	3	1
5	(Germany) A Beck	6	6
