= 2012 Aegon GB Pro-Series Barnstaple – Doubles =

Doubles
- 2012 Aegon GB Pro-Series Barnstaple

Final
- Champions: (Uzbekistan) Akgul Amanmuradova (Serbia) Vesna Dolonc
- Runners-up: (Latvia) Diāna Marcinkēviča (Belarus) Aliaksandra Sasnovich
- Score: 6–3, 6–1

Events
Singles	Doubles
- Aegon GB Pro-Series Barnstaple

Eva Birnerová and Anne Keothavong were the defending champions, but Birnerová chose not to participate. Keothavong partnered up with Tara Moore, but they lost in the semifinals to top seeded Akgul Amanmuradova and Vesna Dolonc. Amanmuradova and Dolonc won the title, defeating Diāna Marcinkēviča and Aliaksandra Sasnovich in the final, 6–3, 6–1.

== Seeds ==
1. (Uzbekistan) Akgul Amanmuradova / (Serbia) Vesna Dolonc (champions)
2. (Austria) Sandra Klemenschits / (Switzerland) Romina Oprandi (semifinals)
3. (Portugal) Maria João Koehler / (Russia) Marta Sirotkina (first round)
4. (United States) Madison Brengle / (Bulgaria) Elitsa Kostova (quarterfinals)

== Draw ==
Key

- Q = Qualifier
- WC = Wild card
- LL = Lucky loser
- Alt = Alternate
- ITF = ITF entry
- PR = Protected ranking
- SR = Special ranking
- SE = Special exempt
- JE = Junior exempt
- JR = Junior Accelerator Programme entrant
- CO = College Accelerator Programme entrant
- NG = Next Gen Accelerator Program entrant
- w/o = Walkover
- r = Retired
- d = Defaulted

First round
1	(Uzbekistan) A Amanmuradova (Serbia) V Dolonc	6	6
(Italy) N Clerico (Croatia) T Mrdeža	0	3
(Russia) E Bychkova (Lithuania) L Stančiūtė	6	6
(Netherlands) L Kerkhove (France) C Sibille	2	2
4	(United States) M Brengle (Bulgaria) E Kostova	6	4	[10]
(Kazakhstan) A Danilina (Russia) M Katsitadze	2	6	[8]
(Denmark) K Barbat (United Kingdom) A Elliott	3	2
(United Kingdom) A Keothavong (United Kingdom) T Moore	6	6
(Republic of Ireland) A Bowtell (United Kingdom) L Brown	3	5
(United Kingdom) A Fitzpatrick (United Kingdom) J Windley	6	7
(Latvia) D Marcinkēviča (Belarus) A Sasnovich	5	6	[10]
3	(Portugal) MJ Koehler (Russia) M Sirotkina	7	2	[6]
(United Kingdom) S Bamburac (United Kingdom) L Deigman	2	2
(Czech Republic) H Birnerová (United Kingdom) E Webley-Smith	6	6
(United Kingdom) A Watts (United Kingdom) S Watts	0	1
2	(Austria) S Klemenschits (Switzerland) R Oprandi	6	6

Quarterfinals
1	(Uzbekistan) A Amanmuradova (Serbia) V Dolonc	6	6
(Russia) E Bychkova (Lithuania) L Stančiūtė	1	2
4	(United States) M Brengle (Bulgaria) E Kostova	2	3
(United Kingdom) A Keothavong (United Kingdom) T Moore	6	6
(United Kingdom) A Fitzpatrick (United Kingdom) J Windley	6	6^{4}	[4]
(Latvia) D Marcinkēviča (Belarus) A Sasnovich	3	7^{7}	[10]
(Czech Republic) H Birnerová (United Kingdom) E Webley-Smith	3	1
2	(Austria) S Klemenschits (Switzerland) R Oprandi	6	6

Semifinals
1	(Uzbekistan) A Amanmuradova (Serbia) V Dolonc	6	6
(United Kingdom) A Keothavong (United Kingdom) T Moore	0	2
(Latvia) D Marcinkēviča (Belarus) A Sasnovich	1	7	[10]
2	(Austria) S Klemenschits (Switzerland) R Oprandi	6	5	[5]

Finals
1	(Uzbekistan) A Amanmuradova (Serbia) V Dolonc	6	6
(Latvia) D Marcinkēviča (Belarus) A Sasnovich	3	1
