= Aegon GB Pro-Series Barnstaple =

ITF Women's Tour
- Event name: Barnstaple
- Location: Barnstaple, United Kingdom
- Venue: Tarka Tennis Centre
- Category: ITF Women's Circuit
- Surface: Hard (indoor)
- Draw: 32S/32Q/16D
- Prize money: $25,000
- Website: Official website

The Aegon GB Pro-Series Barnstaple was a tournament for professional female tennis players played on indoor hardcourts. The event was classified as a $25,000 ITF Women's Circuit tournament. It was held in Barnstaple, England, from 2008 to 2015. In 2014 the event was downgraded from a $75K tournament to a $25K.

== Past finals ==
=== Singles ===
Year	Champion	Runner-up	Score
2015	(Czech Republic) Kristýna Plíšková	(Germany) Nina Zander	6–3, 6–2
2014	(Germany) Carina Witthöft	(Switzerland) Viktorija Golubic	6–2, 6–4
2013	(Russia) Marta Sirotkina	(Czech Republic) Kristýna Plíšková	6–7^{(5–7)}, 6–3, 7–6^{(8–6)}
2012	(Germany) Annika Beck	(Greece) Eleni Daniilidou	6–7^{(1–7)}, 6–2, 6–2
2011	(United Kingdom) Anne Keothavong	(Poland) Marta Domachowska	6–1, 6–3
2010	(United States) Alison Riske	(Sweden) Johanna Larsson	6–2, 6–0
2009	(Sweden) Johanna Larsson	(France) Pauline Parmentier	6–2, 6–2
2008	(United Kingdom) Anne Keothavong	(Italy) Alberta Brianti	6–4, 6–2

=== Doubles ===
Year	Champions	Runners-up	Score
2015	(France) Stéphanie Foretz (Croatia) Ana Vrljić	(United Kingdom) Naomi Broady (Russia) Ekaterina Bychkova	6–2, 5–7, [10–7]
2014	(France) Alizé Lim (Germany) Carina Witthöft	(Switzerland) Viktorija Golubic (Latvia) Diāna Marcinkēviča	6–2, 6–1
2013	(United Kingdom) Naomi Broady (Czech Republic) Kristýna Plíšková	(Romania) Raluca Olaru (Austria) Tamira Paszek	6–3, 3–6, [10–5]
2012	(Uzbekistan) Akgul Amanmuradova (Serbia) Vesna Dolonc	(Latvia) Diāna Marcinkēviča (Belarus) Aliaksandra Sasnovich	6–3, 6–1
2011	(Czech Republic) Eva Birnerová (United Kingdom) Anne Keothavong	(Austria) Sandra Klemenschits (Germany) Tatjana Malek	7–5, 6–1
2010	(Czech Republic) Andrea Hlaváčková (Netherlands) Michaëlla Krajicek	(Austria) Sandra Klemenschits (Germany) Tatjana Malek	7–6^{(7–4)}, 6–2
2009	(Sweden) Johanna Larsson (United Kingdom) Anna Smith	(South Africa) Kelly Anderson (Finland) Emma Laine	6–4, 7–5
2008	(South Africa) Kelly Anderson (Finland) Emma Laine	(Argentina) Erica Krauth (Sweden) Hanna Nooni	6–2, 6–3
