= Myrtille Georges =

French tennis player (born 1990)

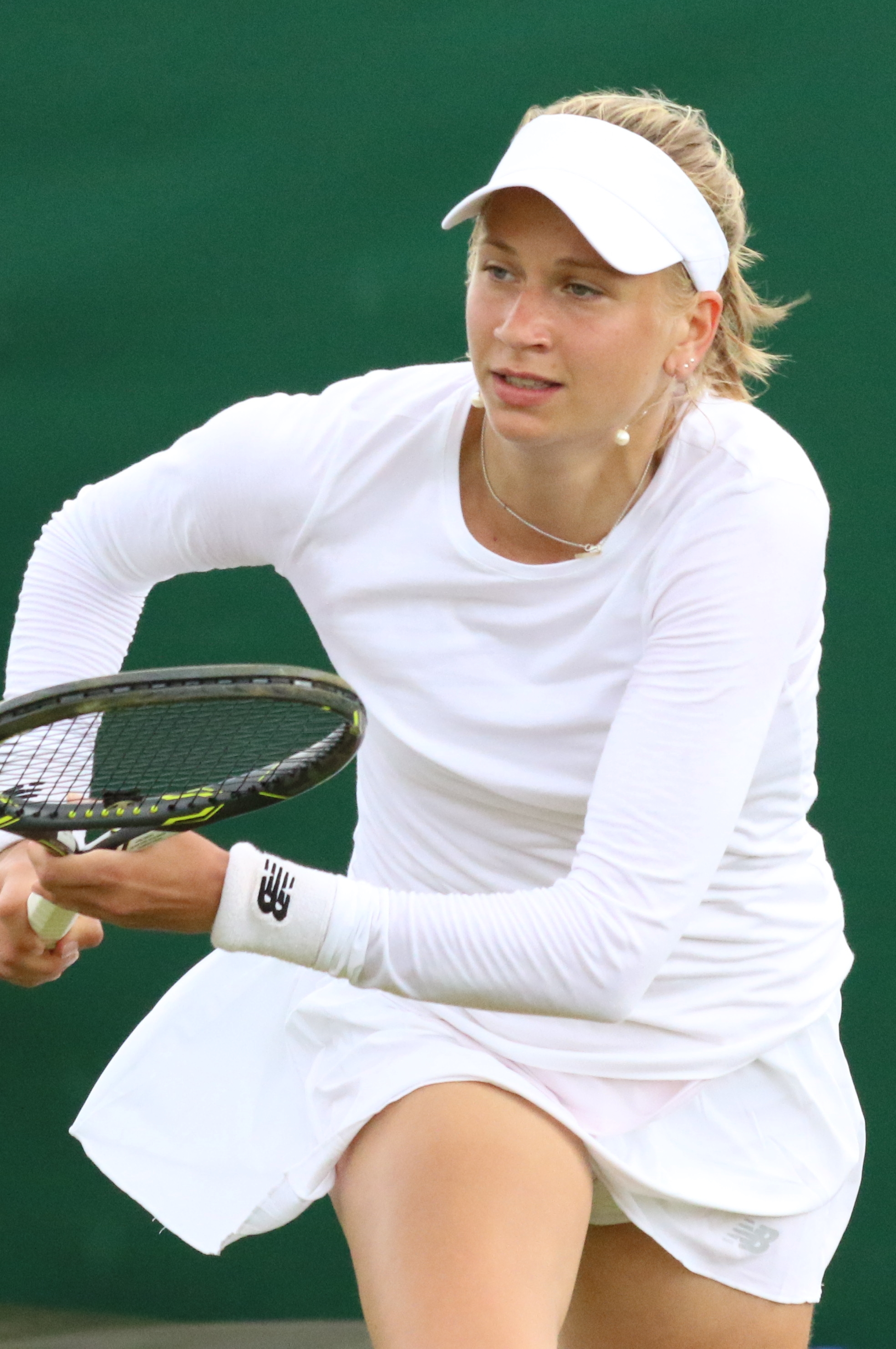
- Georges at the 2016 Wimbledon qualifying
- Country (sports): France
- Residence: Osny, France
- Born: 21 December 1990 (age 35) Granville, France
- Height: 1.74 m (5 ft 9 in)
- Retired: 2020
- Plays: Right (two-handed backhand)
- Prize money: US$ 516,845

Singles
- Career record: 375–317
- Career titles: 9 ITF
- Highest ranking: No. 168 (18 July 2016)

Grand Slam singles results
- Australian Open: 1R (2017)
- French Open: 2R (2016)
- Wimbledon: Q3 (2017)
- US Open: Q3 (2016)

Doubles
- Career record: 90–113
- Career titles: 6 ITF
- Highest ranking: No. 287 (21 August 2017)

Grand Slam doubles results
- French Open: 2R (2017)

Grand Slam mixed doubles results
- French Open: 1R (2017)

Myrtille Georges (French pronunciation: [miʁtij ʒɔʁʒ]; born 21 December 1990) is a French former tennis player.

She has career-high WTA rankings of 168 in singles (achieved on 18 July 2016) and 287 in doubles (21 August 2017). She won nine singles titles and six doubles titles on the ITF Women's World Tennis Tour.

== Career ==
Georges made her debut on the ITF Women's Circuit in November 2006 at a $10k event in Le Havre; she only played in the singles draw and was eliminated in the second round of qualifying. Her next stop was in November 2007 at a $50k tournament in Deauville, France (it was the only tournament that she played in 2007); she only played the singles event and was eliminated in the qualifying first round.

In 2008, she played the singles events of five tournaments (all of them in France and four of them in the last four months of the year) on the ITF Circuit.

From 2009 onwards, Georges started to play more regularly; she played in the singles events of 23 tournaments on the 2009 ITF Circuit.

She made her WTA Tour doubles debut at the 2010 Internationaux de Strasbourg, after receiving a main-draw wildcard; she and her partner Émilie Bacquet lost in the first round to the top-seeded pair of Chuang Chia-jung and Lucie Hradecká, 1–6, 3–6.

Georges made her WTA Tour singles debut at the 2011 Open GdF Suez also thanks to a wildcard; she lost in the first round of qualifying to Maria-Elena Camerin, 3–6, 3–6.

She made her singles major main-draw debut at the 2016 French Open, after being handed a wildcard. Georges had been eliminated in the first or second singles qualifying rounds of the French Open for four consecutive years, from 2012 (the year of her major singles debut) to 2015. In the first round of the 2016 French Open, she defeated world No. 67, Christina McHale, in three sets to register her first career-win over a player ranked in the top 100 of the WTA singles rankings, before losing in the second round to fourth seed Garbiñe Muguruza, 2–6, 0–6 in 53 minutes.

She announced her retirement from professional tennis in September 2020.

== Grand Slam performance timeline ==
Key
W	F	SF	QF	#R	RR	Q#	DNQ	A	NH

(W) winner; (F) finalist; (SF) semifinalist; (QF) quarterfinalist; (#R) rounds 4, 3, 2, 1; (RR) round-robin stage; (Q#) qualification round; (DNQ) did not qualify; (A) absent; (NH) not held; (SR) strike rate (events won / competed); (W–L) win–loss record.

=== Singles ===
Tournament	2012	2013	2014	2015	2016	2017	2018	2019	2020	W–L
Australian Open	A	A	A	A	A	1R	Q1	Q1	A	0–1
French Open	Q1	Q1	Q2	Q1	2R	1R	1R	Q1	A	1–3
Wimbledon	A	A	A	A	Q1	Q3	A	Q1	NH	0–0
US Open	A	A	A	A	Q3	Q1	Q1	A	A	0–0
Win–loss	0–0	0–0	0–0	0–0	1–1	0–2	0–1	0–0	0–0	1–4

== ITF Circuit finals ==
=== Singles: 23 (9 titles, 14 runner-ups) ===
Legend $60,000 tournaments $25,000 tournaments $10/15,000 tournaments	Finals by surface Hard (5–7) Clay (4–7)

Result	W–L	Date	Tournament	Tier	Surface	Opponent	Score
Loss	0–1	Aug 2010	ITF Bree, Belgium	10,000	Clay	(Russia) Valeria Solovieva	7–5, 4–6, 3–6
Win	1–1	Sep 2011	ITF Apeldoorn, Netherlands	10,000	Clay	(Netherlands) Lesley Kerkhove	7–5, 6–4
Loss	1–2	Nov 2011	ITF Loughborough, United Kingdom	10,000	Hard (i)	(United Kingdom) Tara Moore	6–7^{(5)}, 7–5, 4–6
Win	2–2	Apr 2012	ITF Le Havre, France	10,000	Clay (i)	(Belgium) Ysaline Bonaventure	5–7, 7–5, 6–0
Loss	2–3	Apr 2012	ITF San Severo, Italy	10,000	Clay	(Italy) Anastasia Grymalska	6–4, 1–6, 1–6
Loss	2–4	Aug 2012	ITF Rebecq, Belgium	25,000	Clay	(Belgium) Kirsten Flipkens	2–6, 1–6
Loss	2–5	Jan 2013	GB Pro-Series Glasgow, UK	10,000	Hard (i)	(United Kingdom) Tara Moore	4–6, 1–6
Loss	2–6	Aug 2013	ITF Braunschweig, Germany	15,000	Clay	(Germany) Kristina Barrois	6–4, 2–6, 3–6
Loss	2–7	Jan 2014	GB Pro-Series Glasgow, UK	10,000	Hard (i)	(United Kingdom) Tara Moore	3–6, 1–6
Win	3–7	Jan 2015	ITF Port El Kantaoui, Tunisia	10,000	Hard	(France) Estelle Cascino	6–4, 6–2
Win	4–7	Mar 2015	ITF Port El Kantaoui, Tunisia	10,000	Hard	(Bulgaria) Isabella Shinikova	6–4, 6–0
Loss	4–8	Aug 2015	ITF Koksijde, Belgium	25,000	Clay	(Netherlands) Kiki Bertens	6–3, 2–6, 3–6
Win	5–8	Sep 2015	ITF Barcelona, Spain	15,000	Clay	(Spain) Georgina García Pérez	6–3, 7–6^{(3)}
Win	6–8	Feb 2016	Open de l'Isère, France	25,000	Hard (i)	(Netherlands) Indy de Vroome	7–6^{(4)}, 6–2
Win	7–8	May 2017	ITF La Marsa, Tunisia	25,000	Clay	(Russia) Alexandra Panova	6–1, 6–1
Win	8–8	Oct 2017	ITF Cherbourg-en-Cotentin, France	25,000	Hard (i)	(France) Audrey Albié	6–4, 3–6, 7–5
Loss	8–9	Oct 2017	Open de Touraine, France	25,000	Hard (i)	(Czech Republic) Tereza Smitková	3–6, 5–7
Loss	8–10	Feb 2018	ITF Perth, Australia	25,000	Hard	(United Kingdom) Gabriella Taylor	2–6, 5–7
Loss	8–11	Apr 2018	ITF Pula, Italy	25,000	Clay	(Slovenia) Tamara Zidanšek	1–6, 6–7^{(4)}
Loss	8–12	Jun 2018	ITF Périgueux, France	25,000	Clay	(Argentina) Nadia Podoroska	2–6, 0–6
Loss	8–13	Oct 2018	Open de Touraine, France	25,000	Hard (i)	(France) Chloé Paquet	6–7^{(5)}, 2–6
Win	9–13	Mar 2019	ITF Mâcon, France	25,000	Hard (i)	(Netherlands) Lesley Kerkhove	6–3, 6–3
Loss	9–14	Jul 2019	ITF Porto, Portugal	25,000	Hard	(Spain) Eva Guerrero Álvarez	4–6, 7–6^{(4)}, 3–6

=== Doubles: 9 (6 titles, 3 runner-ups) ===
Result	No.	Date	Tournament	Surface	Partner	Opponents	Score
Win	1.	Aug 2010	ITF Rebecq, Belgium	Clay	(France) Émilie Bacquet	(Netherlands) Kika Hogendoorn (Belgium) Elke Lemmens	6–3, 4–6, [11–9]
Win	2.	Apr 2012	ITF Le Havre, France	Clay (i)	(France) Céline Ghesquière	(France) Manon Arcangioli (France) Kinnie Laisné	6–4, 6–2
Win	3.	Jul 2012	Open Porte du Hainaut, France	Clay	(France) Céline Ghesquière	(Slovakia) Michaela Hončová (Bulgaria) Isabella Shinikova	6–4, 6–2
Loss	1.	Aug 2012	ITF Koksijde, Belgium	Clay	(France) Céline Ghesquière	(Romania) Diana Buzean (Netherlands) Daniëlle Harmsen	6–3, 3–6, [5–10]
Win	4.	Jan 2015	ITF Port El Kantaoui, Tunisia	Hard	(France) Céline Ghesquière	(Czech Republic) Kristýna Hrabalová (Czech Republic) Vendula Žovincová	6–7^{(6)}, 6–2, [10–5]
Win	5.	Mar2015	ITF Port El Kantaoui, Tunisia	Hard	(Bulgaria) Isabella Shinikova	(South Africa) Chanel Simmonds (Belgium) Magali Kempen	1–6, 6–4, [10–2]
Loss	2.	Oct 2019	ITF Cherbourg, France	Hard (i)	(Belgium) Kimberley Zimmermann	(United Kingdom) Naomi Broady (United Kingdom) Samantha Murray	3–6, 2–6
Win	6.	Feb 2020	GB Pro-Series Glasgow, UK	Hard (i)	(Belgium) Kimberley Zimmermann	(Belgium) Lara Salden (Denmark) Clara Tauson	7–6^{(2)}, 7–6^{(5)}
Loss	3.	May 2026	ITF Reichstett, France	Clay	(France) Evita Ramirez	(France) Liv Boulard (France) Milena Ciocan	4–6, 3–6
