= Marta Sirotkina =

Russian tennis player

Marta Sirotkina Марта Сироткина
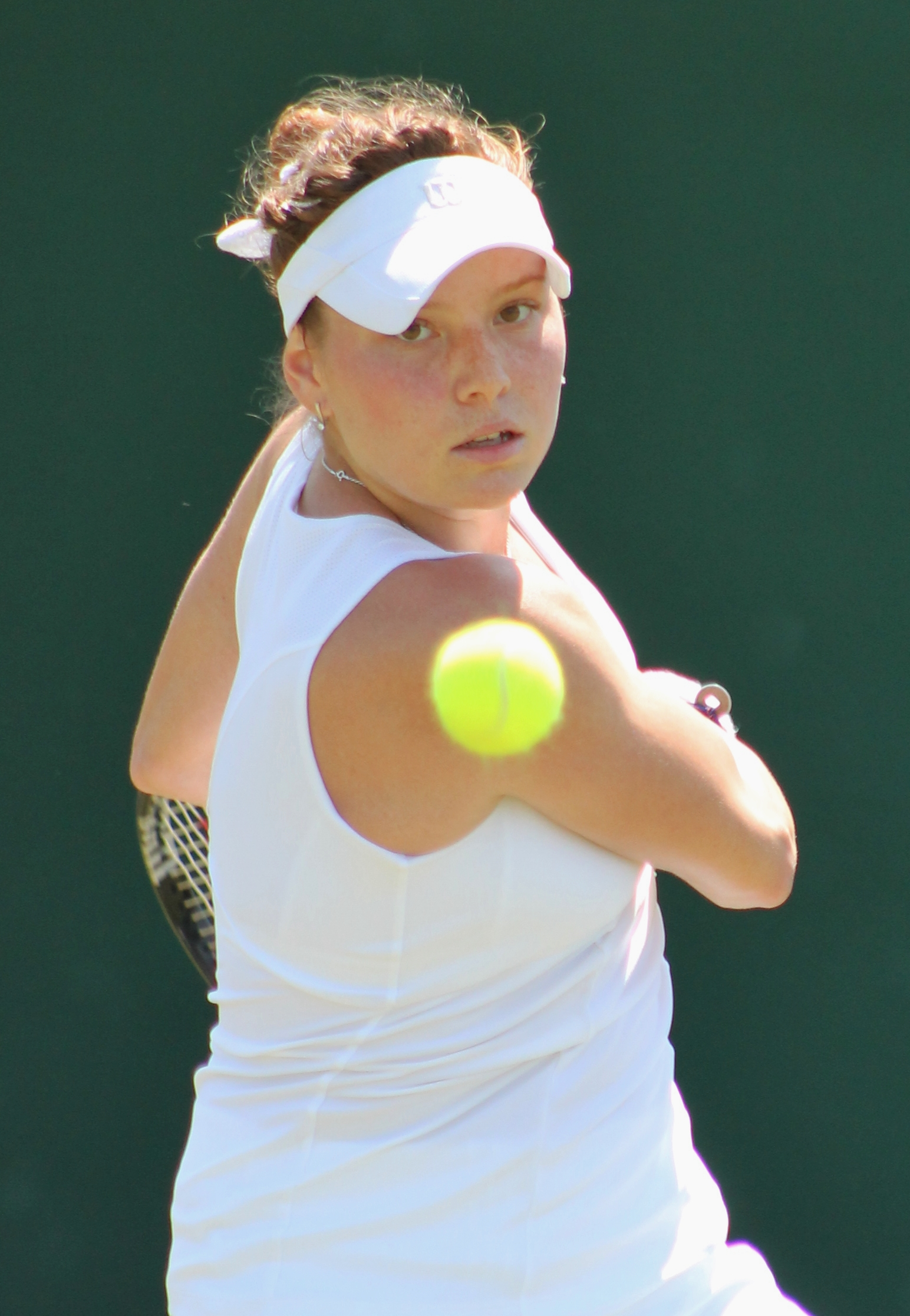
- At the 2014 Wimbledon qualifying
- Country (sports): Russia
- Residence: Moscow
- Born: 22 March 1991 (age 35) Moscow, Russian SFSR, Soviet Union
- Height: 1.70 m (5 ft 7 in)
- Turned pro: 2007
- Retired: 2015
- Plays: Right (two-handed backhand)
- Prize money: US$218,747

Singles
- Career record: 234–140
- Career titles: 12 ITF
- Highest ranking: No. 115 (25 February 2013)

Grand Slam singles results
- Australian Open: Q3 (2013, 2014)
- French Open: Q1 (2014)
- Wimbledon: Q3 (2012)
- US Open: Q1 (2012, 2013)

Doubles
- Career record: 119–67
- Career titles: 12 ITF
- Highest ranking: No. 141 (18 February 2013)

Marta Aleksandrovna Sirotkina (Russian: Марта Александровна Сироткина, born 22 March 1991) is a former Russian tennis player. Her career-high singles ranking is world No. 115, which she reached on 25 February 2013. In doubles, she peaked at No. 141 in February 2013.

== Career highlights ==
Apart from professional success on the ITF Circuit (over her career she won 12 singles and 12 doubles titles), Sirotkina won bronze medals in the Moscow Winter Championships (singles and doubles) in 2009, later winning the gold medal in Russian Championships. She also won silver medals in the Moscow Championships and gold in the "Cup of Russia" doubles tournament.

=== 2011 ===
Sirotkina won three ITF titles in singles in 2011, two $10k tournaments in Bath, Somerset, and Antalya, Turkey, and a $25k tournament in Bangkok, Thailand.

She began 2011 with a bang in Bath, beating the top seed on way to capturing the Aegon Pro Series $10k title, while in the $25k event the following week she beat two higher ranked players to make the main draw where she destroyed former world top-20 star Anna-Lena Grönefeld before falling in the quarterfinals to Claire Feuerstein.

Sirotkina competed in the $25k Foxhills event on 11 July 2011, seeded fifth. Sirotkina defeated Daneika Borthwick in the first round and Samantha Murray in the second round. In the quarterfinals, she was defeated by the top seed Vitalia Diatchenko.

She participated in the Tatarstan Open in singles and in doubles. Ksenia Lykina was her doubles partner. In the first round of the singles, Sirotkina defeated Valeria Solovyeva. In the second round, she lost to the third seed, Anastasiya Yakimova. In the doubles, she and Lykina lost to the second seeds, Ekaterina Ivanova and Andreja Klepač, in the semifinals, after defeating the fourth seeds, Tetyana Arefyeva and Eugeniya Pashkova in the first round and Natela Dzalamidze and Mandy Minella in the quarterfinals.

Sirotkina competed in the 2011 Summer Universiade in both singles and doubles. In singles, she lost in the third round to eventual bronze-medalist Yoo Mi. Sirotkina partnered with Ksenia Lykina in the doubles and they won the bronze medal.

She competed in the singles qualifying of the Tashkent Open, seeded No. 4, and defeated Viktoriya Karmenova, and in the second round Lyudmyla Kichenok. In the final round, she lost to Aleksandra Krunić.

== Personal life ==
Marta completed her studies at the Moscow Institute for Sports and Fitness Studies. She was funded by a sports-academic scholarship from the Yeltsin Fund. As well as her native Russian she speaks English and Spanish, having attended the Spanish Immersion High School in Moscow. She has one older brother, and she likes playing on hardcourt surfaces but her favourite surface is grass.

In October 2010, Hiberno International and Marta signed a long term management agreement which saw Marta undergo an intensive training camp in the Republic of Ireland at the Tennis Ireland BNP-Paribas National Academy in Dublin under the guidance of her manager Alan Moore and the Internationally respected Garry Cahill (former Ireland Fed Cup team captain and former Ireland Davis Cup team captain).

She lives in London with her partner, former Junior US Open champion Oliver Golding.

== ITF Circuit finals ==
Legend
$100,000 tournaments
$75,000 tournaments
$50,000 tournaments
$25,000 tournaments
$10,000 tournaments

=== Singles: 20 (12 titles, 8 runner-ups) ===
Result	No.	Date	Tournament	Tier	Surface	Opponent	Score
Loss	1.	Nov 2009	ITF Stockholm, Sweden	10,000	Hard (i)	(Ukraine) Lyudmyla Kichenok	3–6, 3–6
Win	1.	Apr 2010	ITF Ain Sukhna, Egypt	10,000	Clay	(Georgia (country)) Ekaterine Gorgodze	6–3, 6–1
Win	2.	Sep 2010	ITF Madrid, Spain	10,000	Hard	(United Kingdom) Naomi Broady	4–6, 6–4, 6–4
Win	3.	Nov 2010	ITF Antalya, Turkey	10,000	Hard	(Slovakia) Martina Balogová	6–2, 6–0
Win	4.	Dec 2010	ITF Dubai, United Arab Emirates	10,000	Hard	(Romania) Mihaela Buzărnescu	6–0, 6–0
Win	5.	Mar 2011	GB Pro-Series Bath, UK	10,000	Hard (i)	(Italy) Giulia Gatto-Monticone	w/o
Win	6.	Apr 2011	ITF Antalya, Turkey	10,000	Hard	(Russia) Yana Buchina	6–1, 6–0
Loss	2.	May 2011	ITF Bukhara, Uzbekistan	25,000	Hard	(Austria) Nikola Hofmanova	4–6, 5–7
Win	7.	Jun 2011	ITF Bangkok, Thailand	25,000	Hard	(Thailand) Luksika Kumkhum	6–4, 6–3
Win	8.	Feb 2012	ITF Linköping, Sweden	10,000	Hard (i)	(Serbia) Milana Špremo	6–1, 6–3
Win	9.	Apr 2012	ITF Phuket, Thailand	25,000	Hard	(France) Claire Feuerstein	7–5, 7–6^{(6)}
Win	10.	May 2012	ITF Karuizawa, Japan	25,000	Grass	(Japan) Junri Namigata	6–4, 2–6, 6–4
Loss	3.	Jul 2012	President's Cup, Kazakhstan	100,000	Hard	(Portugal) Maria João Koehler	5–7, 2–6
Loss	4.	Feb 2013	ITF Eilat, Israel	75,000	Hard	(Ukraine) Elina Svitolina	3–6, 6–3, 5–7
Loss	5.	Aug 2013	Tatarstan Open, Russia	50,000	Hard	(Germany) Anna-Lena Friedsam	2–6, 3–6
Loss	6.	Sep 2013	GB Pro-Series Shrewsbury, UK	25,000	Hard	(Belgium) Alison Van Uytvanck	5–7, 1–6
Win	11.	Nov 2013	GB Pro-Series Barnstaple, UK	75,000	Hard (i)	(Czech Republic) Kristýna Plíšková	6–7^{(5)}, 6–3, 7–6^{(6)}
Loss	7.	Dec 2013	Ankara Cup, Turkey	50,000	Hard (i)	(Russia) Vitalia Diatchenko	7–6, 4–6, 4–6
Win	12.	Aug 2014	ITF Woking, United Kingdom	25,000	Hard	(Romania) Ana Bogdan	7–5, 6–3
Loss	8.	Feb 2015	ITF Sunderland, UK	10,000	Hard (i)	(Republic of Ireland) Amy Bowtell	4–6, 3–6

=== Doubles: 17 (12 titles, 5 runner-ups) ===
Result	No.	Date	Tournament	Surface	Partner	Opponents	Score
Win	1.	17 May 2009	ITF St. Petersburg, Russia	Hard (i)	(Russia) Yuliya Kalabina	(Russia) Avgusta Tsybysheva (Russia) Maria Zharkova	6–1, 6–2
Loss	1.	23 May 2009	ITF Moscow, Russia	Clay	(Russia) Yuliya Kalabina	(Russia) Maria Kondratieva (Russia) Arina Rodionova	5–7, 1–6
Win	2.	5 June 2009	ITF Bukhara, Uzbekistan	Hard	(Sweden) Anna Brazhnikova	(Kyrgyzstan) Ksenia Palkina (Russia) Arina Rodionova	3–6, 6–4, [11–9]
Win	3.	11 April 2010	ITF Ain Sukhna, Egypt	Clay	(Sweden) Anna Brazhnikova	(France) Audrey Bergot (South Africa) Chanel Simmonds	6–3, 6–3
Loss	2.	29 May 2010	Grado Tennis Cup, Italy	Clay	(Russia) Karina Pimkina	(China) Han Xinyun (China) Lu Jingjing	6–1, 4–6, [8–10]
Loss	3.	11 September 2010	ITF Madrid, Spain	Hard	(United Kingdom) Jennifer Ren	(United Kingdom) Naomi Broady (United Kingdom) Emily Webley-Smith	2–6, 3–6
Win	4.	30 October 2010	ITF Istanbul, Turkey	Hard	(Georgia (country)) Oksana Kalashnikova	(Russia) Ekaterina Bychkova (France) Iryna Brémond	6–3, 6–1
Win	5.	6 November 2010	ITF Antalya, Turkey	Hard	(Uzbekistan) Nigina Abduraimova	(Russia) Julia Samuseva (Russia) Ekaterina Yakovleva	3–6, 6–1, [10–7]
Win	6.	13 November 2010	ITF Antalya, Turkey	Hard	(Czech Republic) Nikola Fraňková	(Russia) Daria Salnikova (United Kingdom) Nicola Slater	3–6, 7–5, [10–5]
Loss	4.	24 April 2011	ITF Antalya, Turkey	Hard	(Russia) Maria Zharkova	(Romania) Laura-Ioana Andrei (Poland) Sylwia Zagórska	1–6, 6–7^{(0)}
Loss	5.	18 February 2012	ITF Linköping, Sweden	Hard (i)	(Russia) Margarita Lazareva	(Germany) Dejana Raickovic (Germany) Alina Wessel	6–1, 3–6, [8–10]
Win	7.	25 February 2012	ITF Moscow, Russia	Hard (i)	(Georgia (country)) Oksana Kalashnikova	(Russia) Tatiana Kotelnikova (Belarus) Lidziya Marozava	7–6, 4–6, [11–9]
Win	8.	24 March 2012	ITF Phuket, Thailand	Hard	(Russia) Natela Dzalamidze	(Chinese Taipei) Chan Chin-wei (China) Zheng Saisai	6–4, 6–1
Win	9.	21 April 2012	ITF Namangan, Uzbekistan	Hard	(Georgia (country)) Oksana Kalashnikova	(United Kingdom) Naomi Broady (Poland) Paula Kania	6–2, 7–5
Win	10.	28 July 2012	President's Cup, Kazakhstan	Hard	(Georgia (country)) Oksana Kalashnikova	(Ukraine) Lyudmyla Kichenok (Ukraine) Nadiia Kichenok	3–6, 6–4, [10–2]
Win	11.	15 July 2013	ITF Woking, UK	Hard	(United Kingdom) Tara Moore	(Japan) Kanae Hisami (Japan) Mari Tanaka	4–6, 6–1, [10–7]
Win	12.	8 March 2014	ITF Preston, UK	Hard (i)	(United Kingdom) Tara Moore	(Switzerland) Timea Bacsinszky (Germany) Kristina Barrois	3–6, 6–1, [13–11]
