= 2023 Open International Féminin de Montpellier =

Tennis tournament

- Date: 3–9 July 2023
- Edition: 17th
- Category: ITF Women's World Tennis Tour
- Prize money: $60,000
- Surface: Clay / Outdoor
- Location: Montpellier, France

Champions

Singles
- (France) Clara Burel

Doubles
- Amina Anshba / Sofya Lansere
← 2022 ·	Open International Féminin de Montpellier	· 2024 →

The 2023 Open International Féminin de Montpellier was a professional tennis tournament played on outdoor clay courts. It was the seventeenth edition of the tournament, which was part of the 2023 ITF Women's World Tennis Tour. It took place in Montpellier, France, between 3 and 9 July 2023.

== Champions ==
=== Singles ===
- (France) Clara Burel def. (Australia) Astra Sharma, 6–3, 7–5

=== Doubles ===
- Amina Anshba / Sofya Lansere def. (Germany) Julia Lohoff / (Romania) Andreea Mitu, 6–3, 6–4

== Singles main draw entrants ==
=== Seeds ===
Country	Player	Rank	Seed
FRA	Clara Burel	104	1
FRA	Océane Dodin	112	2
	Anastasia Pavlyuchenkova	118	3
ARG	María Lourdes Carlé	141	4
ARG	Julia Riera	150	5
SVK	Rebecca Šramková	174	6
FRA	Elsa Jacquemot	180	7
AND	Victoria Jiménez Kasintseva	182	8

- Rankings are as of 26 June 2023.

=== Other entrants ===
The following players received wildcards into the singles main draw:

- (France) Loïs Boisson
- (France) Clara Burel
- (France) Elsa Jacquemot
- (France) Amandine Monnot

The following players received entry from the qualifying draw:

- (France) Estelle Cascino
- (Algeria) Inès Ibbou
- (France) Sarah Iliev
- (France) Astrid Lew Yan Foon
- (France) Jenny Lim
- (Romania) Andreea Mitu
- (France) Lucie Nguyen Tan
- (Chile) Daniela Seguel
