= 2023 Open International Féminin de Montpellier – Doubles =

Doubles
- 2023 Open International Féminin de Montpellier

Final
- Champions: Amina Anshba; Sofya Lansere
- Runners-up: (Germany) Julia Lohoff (Romania) Andreea Mitu
- Score: 6–3, 6–4

Events
| Singles | Doubles |
| ← 2022 · | Open International Féminin de Montpellier | · 2024 → |

Andrea Gámiz and Andrea Lázaro García were the defending champions but chose not to participate.

Amina Anshba and Sofya Lansere won the title, defeating Julia Lohoff and Andreea Mitu in the final, 6–3, 6–4.

== Seeds ==
1. Amina Anshba / Sofya Lansere (champions)
2. (France) Estelle Cascino / (Australia) Astra Sharma (semifinals)
3. (Germany) Julia Lohoff / (Romania) Andreea Mitu (final)
4. (Croatia) Mariana Dražić / (Bosnia and Herzegovina) Anita Wagner (quarterfinals)

== Draw ==
=== Key ===
- Q = Qualifier
- WC = Wild card
- LL = Lucky loser
- Alt = Alternate
- SE = Special exempt
- PR = Protected ranking
- ITF = ITF entry
- JE = Junior exempt
- w/o = Walkover
- r = Retired
- d = Defaulted
- SR = Special ranking

First round
1 | A Anshba; S Lansere | 6 | 6
(France) E Inisan (France) H Mohamed | 0 | 0
(India) V Shinde; A Zolotareva | 6 | 6
(Australia) A Osborne (Brazil) R Pereira | 2 | 3
4 | (Croatia) M Dražić (Bosnia and Herzegovina) A Wagner | 7 | 6
(Algeria) I Ibbou; A Ureke | 5 | 1
(France) T Andrianjafitrimo (France) F Ferro | 6 | 6
(France) L Pawlak (France) TS Rakotomanga Rajaonah | 1 | 3
T Prozorova; A Tikhonova | 2 | 6 | [8]
(Argentina) ML Carlé (Argentina) J Riera | 6 | 1 | [10]
(France) O Babel (France) S Iliev | 4 | 4
3 | (Germany) J Lohoff (Romania) A Mitu | 6 | 6
(France) E Jacquemot; M Timofeeva | 4 | 3
(France) L Nguyen Tan (Greece) S Sakellaridi | 6 | 6
(France) A Lew Yan Foon (France) J Lim | 4 | 2
2 | (France) E Cascino (Australia) A Sharma | 6 | 6

Quarterfinals
1 | A Anshba; S Lansere | 6 | 3 | [10]
(India) V Shinde; A Zolotareva | 3 | 6 | [8]
4 | (Croatia) M Dražić (Bosnia and Herzegovina) A Wagner | 1 | 4
(France) T Andrianjafitrimo (France) F Ferro | 6 | 6
(Argentina) ML Carlé (Argentina) J Riera | 5 | 3
3 | (Germany) J Lohoff (Romania) A Mitu | 7 | 6
(France) L Nguyen Tan (Greece) S Sakellaridi | 6^{4} | 1
2 | (France) E Cascino (Australia) A Sharma | 7^{7} | 6

Semifinals
1 | A Anshba; S Lansere | w/o
(France) T Andrianjafitrimo (France) F Ferro
3 | (Germany) J Lohoff (Romania) A Mitu | 6 | 1 | [10]
2 | (France) E Cascino (Australia) A Sharma | 3 | 6 | [6]

Final
1 | A Anshba; S Lansere | 6 | 6
3 | (Germany) J Lohoff (Romania) A Mitu | 3 | 4
