= 2022 Open International Féminin de Montpellier =

Tennis tournament

- Date: 27 June–3 July 2022
- Edition: 16th
- Category: ITF Women's World Tennis Tour
- Prize money: $60,000
- Surface: Clay / Outdoor
- Location: Montpellier, France

Champions

Singles
- Oksana Selekhmeteva

Doubles
- (Venezuela) Andrea Gámiz / (Spain) Andrea Lázaro García
← 2021 ·	Open International Féminin de Montpellier	· 2023 →

The 2022 Open International Féminin de Montpellier was a professional tennis tournament played on outdoor clay courts. It was the sixteenth edition of the tournament which was part of the 2022 ITF Women's World Tennis Tour. It took place in Montpellier, France between 27 June and 3 July 2022.

== Champions ==
=== Singles ===
- Oksana Selekhmeteva def. (Ukraine) Kateryna Baindl, 6–3, 5–7, 7–5

=== Doubles ===
- (Venezuela) Andrea Gámiz / (Spain) Andrea Lázaro García def. (France) Estelle Cascino / Irina Khromacheva, 6–4, 2–6, [13–11]

== Singles main draw entrants ==
=== Seeds ===
Country	Player	Rank^{1}	Seed
	Varvara Gracheva	69	1
	Anna Blinkova	122	2
ESP	Cristina Bucșa	131	3
UKR	Kateryna Baindl	149	4
	Erika Andreeva	166	5
FRA	Elsa Jacquemot	173	6
	Oksana Selekhmeteva	179	7
JPN	Moyuka Uchijima	180	8

- ^{1} Rankings are as of 20 June 2022.

=== Other entrants ===
The following players received wildcards into the singles main draw:

- (France) Yaroslava Bartashevich
- (France) Lucie Nguyen Tan
- (France) Alice Robbe
- (France) Margot Yerolymos

The following player received entry using a protected ranking:

- (Ukraine) Kateryna Baindl

The following players received entry from the qualifying draw:

- Mirra Andreeva
- (France) Sara Cakarevic
- (Venezuela) Andrea Gámiz
- (Australia) Alexandra Osborne
- (France) Alice Ramé
- (Romania) Ioana Loredana Roșca
- (France) Margaux Rouvroy
- Diana Shnaider

The following player received entry as a lucky loser:

- (France) Léa Tholey
