= 2021 Open Montpellier Méditerranée Métropole Hérault =

Tennis tournament

- Date: 28 June–4 July 2021
- Edition: 15th
- Category: ITF Women's World Tennis Tour
- Prize money: $60,000
- Surface: Clay
- Location: Montpellier, France

Champions

Singles
- (Ukraine) Anhelina Kalinina

Doubles
- (France) Estelle Cascino / (Italy) Camilla Rosatello
← 2019 ·	Open Montpellier Méditerranée Métropole Hérault	· 2022 →

The 2021 Open Montpellier Méditerranée Métropole Hérault is a professional women's tennis tournament played on outdoor clay courts. It is the fifteenth edition of the tournament which is part of the 2021 ITF Women's World Tennis Tour. It takes place in Montpellier, France between 28 June and 4 July 2021.

== Singles main-draw entrants ==
=== Seeds ===
Country	Player	Rank^{1}	Seed
FRA	Océane Dodin	114	1
EGY	Mayar Sherif	117	2
UKR	Anhelina Kalinina	125	3
FRA	Harmony Tan	132	4
AUS	Maddison Inglis	140	5
USA	Francesca Di Lorenzo	155	6
ESP	Cristina Bucșa	166	7
USA	Grace Min	179	8

- ^{1} Rankings are as of 21 June 2021.

=== Other entrants ===
The following players received wildcards into the singles main draw:

- (France) Salma Djoubri
- (France) Léolia Jeanjean
- (France) Carole Monnet

The following player received entry using a protected ranking:

- (China) Yuan Yue

The following player received entry as a junior exempt:

- (France) Diane Parry

The following player received entry as a special exempt:

- (France) Elsa Jacquemot

The following players received entry from the qualifying draw:

- (Russia) Valentina Ivakhnenko
- (Spain) Guiomar Maristany
- (Germany) Yana Morderger
- (Japan) Yuriko Lily Miyazaki
- (Burundi) Sada Nahimana
- (Russia) Oksana Selekhmeteva
- (Italy) Dalila Spiteri
- (France) Margot Yerolymos

== Champions ==
=== Singles ===
- (Ukraine) Anhelina Kalinina def. (Egypt) Mayar Sherif, 6–2, 6–3

=== Doubles ===
- (France) Estelle Cascino / (Italy) Camilla Rosatello def. (Chinese Taipei) Liang En-shuo / (China) Yuan Yue, 6–3, 6–2
