= 2023 Open International Féminin de Montpellier – Singles =

Singles
- 2023 Open International Féminin de Montpellier

Final
- Champion: (France) Clara Burel
- Runner-up: (Australia) Astra Sharma
- Score: 6–3, 7–5

Events
Singles	Doubles
← 2022 ·	Open International Féminin de Montpellier	· 2024 →

Oksana Selekhmeteva was the defending champion but chose not to participate.

Clara Burel won the title, defeating Astra Sharma in the final, 6–3, 7–5.

== Seeds ==
1. (France) Clara Burel (champion)
2. (France) Océane Dodin (second round)
3. Anastasia Pavlyuchenkova (quarterfinals)
4. (Argentina) María Lourdes Carlé (second round)
5. (Argentina) Julia Riera (semifinals)
6. (Slovakia) Rebecca Šramková (second round)
7. (France) Elsa Jacquemot (first round)
8. (Andorra) Victoria Jiménez Kasintseva (first round)

== Draw ==
=== Key ===
- Q = Qualifier
- WC = Wild card
- LL = Lucky loser
- Alt = Alternate
- SE = Special exempt
- PR = Protected ranking
- ITF = ITF entry
- JE = Junior exempt
- w/o = Walkover
- r = Retired
- d = Defaulted
- SR = Special ranking

=== Finals ===
Semifinals
1/WC	(France) Clara Burel	6	6
(Greece) Sapfo Sakellaridi	0	2
5	(Argentina) Julia Riera	0	7^{7}	3
(Australia) Astra Sharma	6	6^{5}	6

Final
1/WC	(France) Clara Burel	6	7
(Australia) Astra Sharma	3	5

=== Top half ===
First round
1/WC	(France) C Burel	6	6
T Prozorova	1	1
(France) M Rouvroy	6	7
Q	(France) S Iliev	1	5
(France) C Monnet	7	6
A Tikhonova	5	1
Q	(Chile) D Seguel	6	3	3
6	(Slovakia) R Šramková	2	6	6
4	(Argentina) ML Carlé	6	6
(France) T Andrianjafitrimo	3	1
(Ukraine) K Volodko	4	3
Q	(Romania) A Mitu	6	6
Q	(France) A Lew Yan Foon	4	6	6
Q	(Algeria) I Ibbou	6	4	2
(Greece) S Sakellaridi	2	6	6
7/WC	(France) E Jacquemot	6	3	4

Second round
1/WC	(France) C Burel	6	6
(France) M Rouvroy	2	2
(France) C Monnet	7^{7}	7^{7}
6	(Slovakia) R Šramková	6^{2}	6^{2}
4	(Argentina) ML Carlé	6	3	1
Q	(Romania) A Mitu	1	6	6
Q	(France) A Lew Yan Foon	4	2
(Greece) S Sakellaridi	6	6

Quarterfinals
1/WC	(France) C Burel	3	6	6
(France) C Monnet	6	3	4
Q	(Romania) A Mitu
(Greece) S Sakellaridi	w/o

Semifinals
1/WC	(France) C Burel	6	6
(Greece) S Sakellaridi	0	2

=== Bottom half ===
First round
5	(Argentina) J Riera	6	6
Q	(France) E Cascino	0	1
WC	(France) A Monnot	6^{6}	6	4
(Czech Republic) B Palicová	7^{8}	4	6
WC	(France) L Boisson	3	4
(France) F Ferro	6	6
M Timofeeva	3	3
3	A Pavlyuchenkova	6	6
8	(Andorra) V Jiménez Kasintseva	1	6	5
(Australia) A Sharma	6	3	7
A Anshba	6	7
Q	(France) L Nguyen Tan	4	5
Q	(France) J Lim	3	6	6
S Lansere	6	2	3
A Zolotareva	4	1
2	(France) O Dodin	6	6

Second round
5	(Argentina) J Riera	6	6
(Czech Republic) B Palicová	3	4
(France) F Ferro	6	2	3
3	A Pavlyuchenkova	2	6	6
(Australia) A Sharma	7	6
A Anshba	5	3
Q	(France) J Lim	1	6	6
2	(France) O Dodin	6	3	3

Quarterfinals
5	(Argentina) J Riera	6^{4}	6	6
3	A Pavlyuchenkova	7^{7}	4	3
(Australia) A Sharma	6	6
Q	(France) J Lim	0	2

Semifinals
5	(Argentina) J Riera	0	7^{7}	3
(Australia) A Sharma	6	6^{5}	6
