= 2022 Open International Féminin de Montpellier – Doubles =

Doubles
- 2022 Open International Féminin de Montpellier

Final
- Champions: (Venezuela) Andrea Gámiz (Spain) Andrea Lázaro García
- Runners-up: (France) Estelle Cascino; Irina Khromacheva
- Score: 6–4, 2–6, [13–11]

Events
Singles	Doubles
← 2021 ·	Open International Féminin de Montpellier	· 2023 →

Estelle Cascino and Camilla Rosatello were the defending champions but Rosatello chose not to participate.

Cascino partnered alongside Irina Khromacheva, but lost in the final to Andrea Gámiz and Andrea Lázaro García, 6–4, 2–6, [13–11].

== Seeds ==
1. (Brazil) Carolina Alves / (Argentina) María Lourdes Carlé (semifinals)
2. (France) Estelle Cascino / Irina Khromacheva (final)
3. (Venezuela) Andrea Gámiz / (Spain) Andrea Lázaro García (champions)
4. (Australia) Alexandra Osborne / (Indonesia) Jessy Rompies (semifinals)

== Draw ==
=== Key ===
- Q = Qualifier
- WC = Wild card
- LL = Lucky loser
- Alt = Alternate
- SE = Special exempt
- PR = Protected ranking
- ITF = ITF entry
- JE = Junior exempt
- w/o = Walkover
- r = Retired
- d = Defaulted
- SR = Special ranking

=== Draw ===
First round
(France) O Babel (France) L Nguyen Tan	6	6
(Argentina) J Estable (Brazil) R Pereira	2	3
3	(Venezuela) A Gámiz (Spain) A Lázaro García	7	6
(Spain) C Bucșa (China) Jin Lu	5	2
(United States) F Di Lorenzo (United States) G Min	6^{3}	2^{r}
(Burundi) S Nahimana (France) A Robbe	7^{7}	1
(United Kingdom) A Collins (Latvia) D Vismane	7^{7}	6
(France) E Jacquemot (Romania) IL Roșca	6^{4}	3
(France) L Pawlak (Greece) S Sakellaridi	4	0
4	(Australia) A Osborne (Indonesia) J Rompies	6	6
(United Kingdom) E Appleton (Japan) M Uchijima	3	6	[6]
(Germany) T Morderger (Germany) Y Morderger	6	3	[10]
O Selekhmeteva; D Shnaider	7^{7}	4	[4]
2	(France) E Cascino; I Khromacheva	6^{3}	6	[10]

Quarterfinals
1	(Brazil) C Alves (Argentina) ML Carlé	6	7
(France) O Babel (France) L Nguyen Tan	4	5
3	(Venezuela) A Gámiz (Spain) A Lázaro García	6	6
(Burundi) S Nahimana (France) A Robbe	4	1
(United Kingdom) A Collins (Latvia) D Vismane	6^{2}	4
4	(Australia) A Osborne (Indonesia) J Rompies	7^{7}	6
(Germany) T Morderger (Germany) Y Morderger	1	1
2	(France) E Cascino; I Khromacheva	6	6

Semifinals
1	(Brazil) C Alves (Argentina) ML Carlé	2	6^{9}
3	(Venezuela) A Gámiz (Spain) A Lázaro García	6	7^{11}
4	(Australia) A Osborne (Indonesia) J Rompies	3	4
2	(France) E Cascino; I Khromacheva	6	6

Final
3	(Venezuela) A Gámiz (Spain) A Lázaro García	6	2	[13]
2	(France) E Cascino; I Khromacheva	4	6	[11]
