= 2021 Open Montpellier Méditerranée Métropole Hérault – Singles =

Singles
- 2021 Open Montpellier Méditerranée Métropole Hérault

Final
- Champion: (Ukraine) Anhelina Kalinina
- Runner-up: (Egypt) Mayar Sherif
- Score: 6–2, 6–3

Events
| Singles | Doubles |
| ← 2019 · | Open Montpellier Méditerranée Métropole Hérault | · 2022 → |

Varvara Gracheva was the defending champion but chose to compete at Wimbledon instead.

Anhelina Kalinina won the title, defeating Mayar Sherif in the final, 6–2, 6–3.

== Seeds ==
1. (France) Océane Dodin (quarterfinals)
2. (Egypt) Mayar Sherif (final)
3. (Ukraine) Anhelina Kalinina (champion)
4. (France) Harmony Tan (second round, retired)
5. (Australia) Maddison Inglis (second round)
6. (United States) Francesca Di Lorenzo (first round)
7. (Spain) Cristina Bucșa (semifinals)
8. (United States) Grace Min (first round)

== Draw ==
=== Key ===
- Q = Qualifier
- WC = Wild card
- LL = Lucky loser
- Alt = Alternate
- SE = Special exempt
- PR = Protected ranking
- ITF = ITF entry
- JE = Junior exempt
- w/o = Walkover
- r = Retired
- d = Defaulted
- SR = Special ranking

=== Finals ===
Semifinals
(China) Zheng Qinwen | 1 | 6 | 2
3 | (Ukraine) Anhelina Kalinina | 6 | 4 | 6
7 | (Spain) Cristina Bucșa | 3 | 4
2 | (Egypt) Mayar Sherif | 6 | 6

Final
3 | (Ukraine) Anhelina Kalinina | 6 | 6
2 | (Egypt) Mayar Sherif | 2 | 3

=== Top half ===
First round
1 | (France) O Dodin | 7 | 6
Q | (France) M Yerolymos | 5 | 2
Q | (Italy) D Spiteri | 4 | 6^{4}
(Romania) I Fetecău | 6 | 7^{7}
Q | (Germany) Y Morderger | 7 | 6
WC | (France) L Jeanjean | 5 | 4
(China) Q Zheng | 6 | 6
8 | (United States) G Min | 4 | 3
3 | (Ukraine) A Kalinina | 6 | 7
JE | (France) D Parry | 1 | 5
Q | (Japan) YL Miyazaki | 2 | 6 | 6
SE | (France) E Jacquemot | 6 | 3 | 0
(Chile) D Seguel | 6 | 4 | 0
(Italy) M Di Giuseppe | 4 | 6 | 6
PR | (China) Y Yuan | 7^{7} | 3 | 2
5 | (Australia) M Inglis | 6^{5} | 6 | 6

Second round
1 | (France) O Dodin | 6 | 2 | 6
(Romania) I Fetecău | 4 | 6 | 0
Q | (Germany) Y Morderger | 3 | 2
(China) Q Zheng | 6 | 6
3 | (Ukraine) A Kalinina | 6 | 6
Q | (Japan) YL Miyazaki | 2 | 2
(Italy) M Di Giuseppe | 7^{7} | 6
5 | (Australia) M Inglis | 6^{3} | 1

Quarterfinals
1 | (France) O Dodin | 5 | 1
(China) Q Zheng | 7 | 6
3 | (Ukraine) A Kalinina | 6 | 6
(Italy) M Di Giuseppe | 2 | 3

Semifinals
(China) Q Zheng | 1 | 6 | 2
3 | (Ukraine) A Kalinina | 6 | 4 | 6

=== Bottom half ===
First round
7 | (Spain) C Bucșa | 6 | 7
(France) A Hesse | 4 | 5
(Romania) E-G Ruse | 6 | 6
(China) Jia Lu | 4 | 2
(United States) J Loeb | 7^{7} | 6^{3} | 4
Q | (Burundi) S Nahimana | 6^{4} | 7^{7} | 6
(Norway) U Eikeri | 2 | 1
4 | (France) H Tan | 6 | 6
6 | (United States) F Di Lorenzo | 1 | 4
(France) T Andrianjafitrimo | 6 | 6
Q | (Russia) O Selekhmeteva | 6 | 6
WC | (France) S Djoubri | 3 | 4
Q | (Russia) V Ivakhnenko | 6 | 6
WC | (France) C Monnet | 2 | 4
Q | (Spain) G Maristany | 6^{10} | 4
2 | (Egypt) M Sherif | 7^{12} | 6

Second round
7 | (Spain) C Bucșa | 7^{7} | 7^{7}
(Romania) E-G Ruse | 6^{2} | 6^{5}
Q | (Burundi) S Nahimana | 6 | 1
4 | (France) H Tan | 2 | 0^{r}
(France) T Andrianjafitrimo | 2 | 1
Q | (Russia) O Selekhmeteva | 6 | 6
Q | (Russia) V Ivakhnenko | 6 | 2 | 3
2 | (Egypt) M Sherif | 1 | 6 | 6

Quarterfinals
7 | (Spain) C Bucșa | 6 | 6
Q | (Burundi) S Nahimana | 1 | 2
Q | (Russia) O Selekhmeteva | 3 | 3
2 | (Egypt) M Sherif | 6 | 6

Semifinals
7 | (Spain) C Bucșa | 3 | 4
2 | (Egypt) M Sherif | 6 | 6
