= 2024 Open International Féminin de Montpellier =

Tennis tournament

- Date: 1–7 July 2024
- Edition: 18th
- Category: ITF Women's World Tennis Tour
- Prize money: $60,000
- Surface: Clay / Outdoor
- Location: Montpellier, France

Champions

Singles
- (Poland) Maja Chwalińska

Doubles
- (Croatia) Mariana Dražić / Iryna Shymanovich
- Open International Féminin de Montpellier

The 2024 Open International Féminin de Montpellier was a professional tennis tournament played on outdoor clay courts. It was the eighteenth edition of the tournament, which was part of the 2024 ITF Women's World Tennis Tour. It took place in Montpellier, France, between 1 and 7 July 2024.

== Champions ==
=== Singles ===
- (Poland) Maja Chwalińska def. Oksana Selekhmeteva, 6–3, 6–2

=== Doubles ===
- (Croatia) Mariana Dražić / Iryna Shymanovich def. Elena Pridankina / Ekaterina Yashina, 1–6, 6–4, [10–8]

== Singles main draw entrants ==
=== Seeds ===
| Country | Player | Rank | Seed |
|---|---|---|---|
| LAT | Darja Semeņistaja | 107 | 1 |
| BRA | Laura Pigossi | 108 | 2 |
| JPN | Mai Hontama | 109 | 3 |
| AUS | Astra Sharma | 139 | 4 |
| ESP | Nuria Párrizas Díaz | 166 | 5 |
| JPN | Sara Saito | 169 | 6 |
| CRO | Lucija Ćirić Bagarić | 170 | 7 |
| GER | Noma Noha Akugue | 179 | 8 |

- Rankings are as of 24 June 2024.

=== Other entrants ===
The following players received wildcards into the singles main draw:

- (France) Amandine Hesse
- (France) Tiantsoa Sarah Rakotomanga Rajaonah
- (France) Margaux Rouvroy
- Oksana Selekhmeteva

The following players received entry through special exempts:

- (France) Emma Léné
- (France) Alice Tubello

The following players received entry from the qualifying draw:

- (France) Audrey Albié
- (United States) Jessie Aney
- (Andorra) Victoria Jiménez Kasintseva
- (France) Jenny Lim
- (Lithuania) Justina Mikulskytė
- Elena Pridankina
- (France) Alice Ramé
- Iryna Shymanovich

The following player received entry as a lucky loser:

- (France) Émeline Dartron
