= 2021 Open Montpellier Méditerranée Métropole Hérault – Doubles =

Doubles
- 2021 Open Montpellier Méditerranée Métropole Hérault

Final
- Champions: (France) Estelle Cascino (Italy) Camilla Rosatello
- Runners-up: (Chinese Taipei) Liang En-shuo (China) Yuan Yue
- Score: 6–3, 6–2

Events
Singles	Doubles
← 2019 ·	Open Montpellier Méditerranée Métropole Hérault	· 2022 →

Marina Melnikova and Eva Wacanno were the defending champions but chose not to participate.

Estelle Cascino and Camilla Rosatello won the title, defeating Liang En-shuo and Yuan Yue in the final, 6–3, 6–2.

== Seeds ==
1. (Switzerland) Xenia Knoll / (Romania) Elena-Gabriela Ruse (first round)
2. (Norway) Ulrikke Eikeri / (Egypt) Mayar Sherif (quarterfinals)
3. (Australia) Maddison Inglis / (New Zealand) Erin Routliffe (semifinals)
4. (France) Estelle Cascino / (Italy) Camilla Rosatello (champions)

== Draw ==
=== Key ===
- Q = Qualifier
- WC = Wild card
- LL = Lucky loser
- Alt = Alternate
- SE = Special exempt
- PR = Protected ranking
- ITF = ITF entry
- JE = Junior exempt
- w/o = Walkover
- r = Retired
- d = Defaulted
- SR = Special ranking

=== Draw ===
First round
1	(Switzerland) X Knoll (Romania) E-G Ruse	7^{8}	3	[1]
(United Kingdom) E Appleton (Japan) YL Miyazaki	6^{6}	6	[10]
(Ukraine) M Kostiuk (France) H Mohamed	2	4
(Romania) I Fetecău (France) M Partaud	6	6
4	(France) E Cascino (Italy) C Rosatello	6	6
(France) L Pawlak (France) TS Rakotomanga Rajaonah	2	4
(France) A Hesse (France) L Jeanjean	3	6	[14]
(France) C Monnet (Italy) D Spiteri	6	2	[12]
(France) E Jacquemot (Russia) O Selekhmeteva	4	6	[9]
(Germany) T Morderger (Germany) Y Morderger	6	1	[11]
(France) E Mazzoni (France) J Mazzoni	0	0
3	(Australia) M Inglis (New Zealand) E Routliffe	6	6
(United States) F Di Lorenzo (United States) J Loeb	2	4
(Chinese Taipei) E-s Liang (China) Y Yuan	6	6
(Russia) A Fomina (Russia) V Ivakhnenko	1	3
2	(Norway) U Eikeri (Egypt) M Sherif	6	6

Quarterfinals
(United Kingdom) E Appleton (Japan) YL Miyazaki	6	6
(Romania) I Fetecău (France) M Partaud	2	3
4	(France) E Cascino (Italy) C Rosatello	3	6	[10]
(France) A Hesse (France) L Jeanjean	6	1	[8]
(Germany) T Morderger (Germany) Y Morderger	0	6	[2]
3	(Australia) M Inglis (New Zealand) E Routliffe	6	4	[10]
(Chinese Taipei) E-s Liang (China) Y Yuan	6	6
2	(Norway) U Eikeri (Egypt) M Sherif	4	2

Semifinals
(United Kingdom) E Appleton (Japan) YL Miyazaki	5	4
4	(France) E Cascino (Italy) C Rosatello	7	6
3	(Australia) M Inglis (New Zealand) E Routliffe	1	3
(Chinese Taipei) E-s Liang (China) Y Yuan	6	6

Final
4	(France) E Cascino (Italy) C Rosatello	6	6
(Chinese Taipei) E-s Liang (China) Y Yuan	3	2
