= 2015 Open Montpellier Méditerranée Métropole Hérault =

- Date: 15–21 June
- Edition: 10th
- Category: ITF Women's Circuit
- Prize money: $50,000+H
- Surface: Clay
- Location: Montpellier, France

Champions

Singles
- (Spain) Lourdes Domínguez Lino

Doubles
- (Argentina) María Irigoyen / (Czech Republic) Barbora Krejčíková
Open Montpellier Méditerranée Métropole Hérault

The 2015 Open Montpellier Méditerranée Métropole Hérault was a professional tennis tournament played on outdoor clay courts. It was the tenth edition of the tournament and part of the 2015 ITF Women's Circuit, offering a total of $50,000+H in prize money. It took place in Montpellier, France, on 15–21 June 2015.

== Singles main draw entrants ==
=== Seeds ===
Country	Player	Rank^{1}	Seed
ESP	Lourdes Domínguez Lino	101	1
ESP	Sílvia Soler Espinosa	104	2
FRA	Pauline Parmentier	112	3
NED	Richèl Hogenkamp	122	4
NED	Kiki Bertens	132	5
GER	Laura Siegemund	135	6
CZE	Barbora Krejčíková	140	7
RUS	Alexandra Panova	146	8

- ^{1} Rankings as of 8 June 2015

=== Other entrants ===
The following players received wildcards into the singles main draw:

- (France) Kinnie Laisné
- (France) Sherazad Reix
- (France) Constance Sibille
- (France) Jade Suvrijn

The following players received entry from the qualifying draw:

- (France) Myrtille Georges
- (Serbia) Ivana Jorović
- (Spain) Cristina Sánchez Quintanar
- (Russia) Natalia Vikhlyantseva

The following player received entry by a protected ranking:

- (Russia) Victoria Kan

== Champions ==
=== Singles ===
- (Spain) Lourdes Domínguez Lino def. (Spain) Sílvia Soler Espinosa, 6–4, 6–3

=== Doubles ===
- (Argentina) María Irigoyen / (Czech Republic) Barbora Krejčíková def. (Germany) Laura Siegemund / (Czech Republic) Renata Voráčová, 6–4, 6–2
