= 2015 Open Montpellier Méditerranée Métropole Hérault – Singles =

Singles
- 2015 Open Montpellier Méditerranée Métropole Hérault

Final
- Champion: (Spain) Lourdes Domínguez Lino
- Runner-up: (Spain) Sílvia Soler Espinosa
- Score: 6–4, 6–3

Events
Singles	Doubles
Open Montpellier Méditerranée Métropole Hérault

Elitsa Kostova was the defending champion, but lost in the first round to Pauline Parmentier.

Top seed Lourdes Domínguez Lino won the title, defeating second seed Sílvia Soler Espinosa in an all-Spanish final, 6–4, 6–3.

== Seeds ==
1. (Spain) Lourdes Domínguez Lino (champion)
2. (Spain) Sílvia Soler Espinosa (final)
3. (France) Pauline Parmentier (quarterfinals)
4. (Netherlands) Richèl Hogenkamp (semifinals)
5. (Netherlands) Kiki Bertens (quarterfinals; retired)
6. (Germany) Laura Siegemund (semifinals)
7. (Czech Republic) Barbora Krejčíková (first round)
8. (Russia) Alexandra Panova (second round)

== Main draw ==
=== Key ===
- Q = Qualifier
- WC = Wild card
- LL = Lucky loser
- Alt = Alternate
- SE = Special exempt
- PR = Protected ranking
- ITF = ITF entry
- JE = Junior exempt
- w/o = Walkover
- r = Retired
- d = Defaulted
- SR = Special ranking

=== Finals ===
Semifinals
1	(Spain) Lourdes Domínguez Lino	7^{9}	6
4	(Netherlands) Richèl Hogenkamp	6^{7}	2
6	(Germany) Laura Siegemund	6	3	1
2	(Spain) Sílvia Soler Espinosa	0	6	6

Final
1	(Spain) Lourdes Domínguez Lino	6	6
2	(Spain) Sílvia Soler Espinosa	4	3

=== Top half ===
First round
1	(Spain) L Domínguez Lino	6	6
(United States) A Kiick	4	1
(Argentina) F Molinero	3	2
(Mexico) M Zacarías	6	6
(France) J Coin	6	3	3
(Russia) M Melnikova	3	6	6
Q	(Spain) C Sánchez Quintanar	0	1
5	(Netherlands) K Bertens	6	6
4	(Netherlands) R Hogenkamp	6	2	6
(Romania) S Cîrstea	4	6	0
(Spain) L Pous Tió	6	6
Q	(Serbia) I Jorović	3	2
WC	(France) C Sibille	6	6
(Argentina) P Ormaechea	2	4
(Argentina) M Irigoyen	7^{7}	6
7	(Czech Republic) B Krejčíková	6^{3}	3

Second round
1	(Spain) L Domínguez Lino	6	5	6
(Mexico) M Zacarías	2	7	3
(Russia) M Melnikova	4	7^{8}	1
5	(Netherlands) K Bertens	6	6^{6}	6
4	(Netherlands) R Hogenkamp	6	7
(Spain) L Pous Tió	2	5
WC	(France) C Sibille	6	6
(Argentina) M Irigoyen	4	4

Quarterfinals
1	(Spain) L Domínguez Lino	6	1
5	(Netherlands) K Bertens	3	0^{r}
4	(Netherlands) R Hogenkamp	7	6
WC	(France) C Sibille	5	1

Semifinals
1	(Spain) L Domínguez Lino	7^{9}	6
4	(Netherlands) R Hogenkamp	6^{7}	2

=== Bottom half ===
First round
6	(Germany) L Siegemund	6	6
PR	(Russia) V Kan	0	1
WC	(France) J Suvrijn	2	6	3
(Spain) MT Torró Flor	6	3	6
WC	(France) K Lasiné	7	4	4
(Netherlands) L Kerkhove	5	6	6
(Bulgaria) E Kostova	2	2
3	(France) P Parmentier	6	6
8	(Russia) A Panova	2	6	6
(France) I Ramialison	6	1	2
(Croatia) J Fett	5	1
Q	(Russia) N Vikhlyantseva	7	6
(Czech Republic) R Voráčová	5	3
Q	(France) M Georges	7	6
WC	(France) S Reix	6^{3}	7	5
2	(Spain) S Soler Espinosa	7^{7}	5	7

Second round
6	(Germany) L Siegemund	6	6
(Spain) MT Torró Flor	2	3
(Netherlands) L Kerkhove	5	3
3	(France) P Parmentier	7	6
8	(Russia) A Panova	3	3
Q	(Russia) N Vikhlyantseva	6	6
Q	(France) M Georges	1	4
2	(Spain) S Soler Espinosa	6	6

Quarterfinals
6	(Germany) L Siegemund	6	7
3	(France) P Parmentier	2	5
Q	(Russia) N Vikhlyantseva	3	3
2	(Spain) S Soler Espinosa	6	6

Semifinals
6	(Germany) L Siegemund	6	3	1
2	(Spain) S Soler Espinosa	0	6	6
