= 2024 Open International Féminin de Montpellier – Singles =

Singles
- 2024 Open International Féminin de Montpellier

Final
- Champion: (Poland) Maja Chwalińska
- Runner-up: Oksana Selekhmeteva
- Score: 6–3, 6–2

Events
Singles	Doubles
← 2023 ·	Open International Féminin de Montpellier	· 2025 →

Clara Burel was the defending champion but chose to compete at Wimbledon instead.

Maja Chwalińska won the title, defeating Oksana Selekhmeteva in the final; 6–3, 6–2

== Seeds ==
1. (Latvia) Darja Semeņistaja (second round)
2. (Brazil) Laura Pigossi (second round)
3. (Japan) Mai Hontama (first round)
4. (Australia) Astra Sharma (first round)
5. (Spain) Nuria Párrizas Díaz (quarterfinals)
6. (Japan) Sara Saito (semifinals)
7. (Croatia) Lucija Ćirić Bagarić (second round)
8. (Germany) Noma Noha Akugue (first round)

== Draw ==
=== Key ===
- Q = Qualifier
- WC = Wild card
- LL = Lucky loser
- Alt = Alternate
- SE = Special exempt
- PR = Protected ranking
- ITF = ITF entry
- JE = Junior exempt
- w/o = Walkover
- r = Retired
- d = Defaulted
- SR = Special ranking

=== Finals ===
Semifinals
WC	Oksana Selekhmeteva	7^{13}	3
(Switzerland) Jil Teichmann	6^{11}	2^{r}
(Poland) Maja Chwalińska	7^{7}	6
6	(Japan) Sara Saito	6^{5}	3

Final
WC	Oksana Selekhmeteva	3	2
(Poland) Maja Chwalińska	6	6

=== Top half ===
First round
1	(Latvia) D Semeņistaja	6	6
LL	(France) É Dartron	1	1
(Belgium) M Benoît	6	2	7
(France) S Janicijevic	2	6	5
Q	(Andorra) V Jiménez Kasintseva	3	6	2
WC	O Selekhmeteva	6	4	6
(Ukraine) A Soboleva	4	6	2
7	(Croatia) L Ćirić Bagarić	6	3	6
3	(Japan) M Hontama	2	3
(Switzerland) J Teichmann	6	6
WC	(France) M Rouvroy	6	4	5
Q	E Pridankina	1	6	7
(France) C Monnet	6	4	6
Q	(United States) J Aney	0	6	1
SE	(France) A Tubello	0	2
5	(Spain) N Párrizas Díaz	6	6

Second round
1	(Latvia) D Semeņistaja	3	2
(Belgium) M Benoît	6	6
WC	O Selekhmeteva	6	6^{2}	6
7	(Croatia) L Ćirić Bagarić	3	7^{7}	4
(Switzerland) J Teichmann	6	6
Q	E Pridankina	3	2
(France) C Monnet	3	4
5	(Spain) N Párrizas Díaz	6	6

Quarterfinals
(Belgium) M Benoît	3	6	5
WC	O Selekhmeteva	6	3	7
(Switzerland) J Teichmann	6	7
5	(Spain) N Párrizas Díaz	3	5

Semifinals
WC	O Selekhmeteva	7^{13}	3
(Switzerland) J Teichmann	6^{11}	2^{r}

=== Bottom half ===
First round
8	(Germany) N Noha Akugue	6^{2}	6	5
SE	(France) E Léné	7^{7}	3	7
(Poland) M Chwalińska	6^{7}	6	6
(Romania) A Mitu	7^{9}	3	1
Q	(France) J Lim	3	2
Q	(Lithuania) J Mikulskytė	6	6
Q	(France) A Albié	6	0	7
4	(Australia) A Sharma	2	6	5
6	(Japan) S Saito	6	6
WC	(France) A Hesse	3	4
(United States) L Chirico	4	3
Q	(France) A Ramé	6	6
(Cyprus) R Șerban	6	7^{7}
WC	(France) TS Rakotomanga Rajaonah	0	6^{2}
Q	I Shymanovich	1	3
2	(Brazil) L Pigossi	6	6

Second round
SE	(France) E Léné	3	0
(Poland) M Chwalińska	6	6
Q	(Lithuania) J Mikulskytė	6	4	6
Q	(France) A Albié	3	6	4
6	(Japan) S Saito	6	6
Q	(France) A Ramé	3	0
(Cyprus) R Șerban	4	6	6
2	(Brazil) L Pigossi	6	2	2

Quarterfinals
(Poland) M Chwalińska	6	6
Q	(Lithuania) J Mikulskytė	2	4
6	(Japan) S Saito	6	4	6
(Cyprus) R Șerban	4	6	4

Semifinals
(Poland) M Chwalińska	7^{7}	6
6	(Japan) S Saito	6^{5}	3
