= 2015 Open Montpellier Méditerranée Métropole Hérault – Doubles =

Doubles
- 2015 Open Montpellier Méditerranée Métropole Hérault

Final
- Champions: (Argentina) María Irigoyen (Czech Republic) Barbora Krejčíková
- Runners-up: (Germany) Laura Siegemund (Czech Republic) Renata Voráčová
- Score: 6–4, 6–2

Events
Singles	Doubles
← 2014 ·	Open Montpellier Méditerranée Métropole Hérault	· 2016 →

Inés Ferrer Suárez and Sara Sorribes Tormo were the defending champions, but both players chose not to participate.

María Irigoyen and Barbora Krejčíková won the title, defeating Laura Siegemund and Renata Voráčová in the final, 6–4, 6–2.

== Seeds ==
1. (Germany) Laura Siegemund / (Czech Republic) Renata Voráčová (final)
2. (Argentina) María Irigoyen / (Czech Republic) Barbora Krejčíková (champions)
3. (France) Amandine Hesse / (Bulgaria) Elitsa Kostova (semifinals)
4. (Argentina) Tatiana Búa / (France) Laura Thorpe (first round)

== Draw ==
=== Key ===
- Q = Qualifier
- WC = Wild card
- LL = Lucky loser
- Alt = Alternate
- SE = Special exempt
- PR = Protected ranking
- ITF = ITF entry
- JE = Junior exempt
- w/o = Walkover
- r = Retired
- d = Defaulted
- SR = Special ranking

First round
1	(Germany) L Siegemund (Czech Republic) R Voráčová	6	6
(France) I Ramialison (France) C Sibille	2	1
(Mexico) V Rodríguez (Mexico) M Zacarías	6	5	[10]
(Netherlands) R Hogenkamp (Netherlands) L Kerkhove	2	7	[5]
4	(Argentina) T Búa (France) L Thorpe	4	4
(Russia) M Melnikova (Spain) L Pous Tió	6	6
(Venezuela) A Gámiz (Argentina) F Molinero	6	6
WC	(France) M Georges (France) C Ghesquière	2	4
(Spain) A Fernández Rabener (Argentina) G Pérez Rojas	7	6
WC	(France) A Bacquié (France) C Touly	5	2
(Austria) S Klemenschits (Argentina) P Ormaechea	1	3
3	(France) A Hesse (Bulgaria) E Kostova	6	6
WC	(France) J Jullien (France) J Suvrijn	0	3
(Paraguay) M González (France) S Reix	6	6
(Croatia) J Fett (Croatia) A Lekaj	4	2
2	(Argentina) M Irigoyen (Czech Republic) B Krejčíková	6	6

Quarterfinals
1	(Germany) L Siegemund (Czech Republic) R Voráčová	4	6	[10]
(Mexico) V Rodríguez (Mexico) M Zacarías	6	1	[2]
(Russia) M Melnikova (Spain) L Pous Tió	6	4	[10]
(Venezuela) A Gámiz (Argentina) F Molinero	1	6	[5]
(Spain) A Fernández Rabener (Argentina) G Pérez Rojas	5	1
3	(France) A Hesse (Bulgaria) E Kostova	7	6
(Paraguay) M González (France) S Reix	6	2	[12]
2	(Argentina) M Irigoyen (Czech Republic) B Krejčíková	0	6	[14]

Semifinals
1	(Germany) L Siegemund (Czech Republic) R Voráčová	6^{4}	6	[10]
(Russia) M Melnikova (Spain) L Pous Tió	7^{7}	3	[7]
3	(France) A Hesse (Bulgaria) E Kostova	2	4
2	(Argentina) M Irigoyen (Czech Republic) B Krejčíková	6	6

Final
1	(Germany) L Siegemund (Czech Republic) R Voráčová	4	2
2	(Argentina) M Irigoyen (Czech Republic) B Krejčíková	6	6
