= 2022 Open International Féminin de Montpellier – Singles =

Singles
- 2022 Open International Féminin de Montpellier

Final
- Champion: Oksana Selekhmeteva
- Runner-up: (Ukraine) Kateryna Baindl
- Score: 6–3, 5–7, 7–5

Events
Singles	Doubles
← 2021 ·	Open International Féminin de Montpellier	· 2023 →

Anhelina Kalinina was the defending champion but chose to participate at Wimbledon instead.

Oksana Selekhmeteva won the title, defeating Kateryna Baindl in the final, 6–3, 5–7, 7–5.

== Seeds ==
1. Varvara Gracheva (first round)
2. Anna Blinkova (first round)
3. (Spain) Cristina Bucșa (quarterfinals)
4. (Ukraine) Kateryna Baindl (final)
5. Erika Andreeva (first round)
6. (France) Elsa Jacquemot (second round)
7. Oksana Selekhmeteva (champion)
8. (Japan) Moyuka Uchijima (quarterfinals)

== Draw ==
=== Key ===
- Q = Qualifier
- WC = Wild card
- LL = Lucky loser
- Alt = Alternate
- SE = Special exempt
- PR = Protected ranking
- ITF = ITF entry
- JE = Junior exempt
- w/o = Walkover
- r = Retired
- d = Defaulted
- SR = Special ranking

=== Finals ===
Semifinals
(Brazil) Carolina Alves	2	2
4/PR	(Ukraine) Kateryna Baindl	6	6
7	Oksana Selekhmeteva	6	7^{8}
(Argentina) María Lourdes Carlé	2	6^{6}

Final
4/PR	(Ukraine) Kateryna Baindl	3	7	5
7	Oksana Selekhmeteva	6	5	7

=== Top half ===
First round
1	V Gracheva	5	4
(Latvia) D Vismane	7	6
Q	(France) A Ramé	0	4
(Brazil) C Alves	6	6
Q	(Australia) A Osborne	2	1
Q	(France) M Rouvroy	6	6
(United States) F Di Lorenzo	6	6
5	E Andreeva	2	2
4/PR	(Ukraine) K Baindl	6	6
Q	(France) S Cakarevic	2	2
(Switzerland) S Vögele	6	6^{7}	1
(United States) G Min	2	7^{9}	6
WC	(France) Y Bartashevich	6	4	6
(United States) E Kalieva	2	6	2
(France) C Monnet	0	4
8	(Japan) M Uchijima	6	6

Second round
(Latvia) D Vismane	6	2	5
(Brazil) C Alves	4	6	7
Q	(France) M Rouvroy	4	4
(United States) F Di Lorenzo	6	6
4/PR	(Ukraine) K Baindl	7	7
(United States) G Min	5	5
WC	(France) Y Bartashevich	0	1
8	(Japan) M Uchijima	6	6

Quarterfinals
(Brazil) C Alves	4	7^{7}	6
(United States) F Di Lorenzo	6	6^{5}	4
4/PR	(Ukraine) K Baindl	7^{7}	6
8	(Japan) M Uchijima	6^{4}	1

Semifinals
(Brazil) C Alves	2	2
4/PR	(Ukraine) K Baindl	6	6

=== Bottom half ===
First round
7	O Selekhmeteva	6	6
WC	(France) M Yerolymos	1	1
Q	M Andreeva	6	6
LL	(France) L Tholey	1	2
WC	(France) L Nguyen Tan	3	1
(Burundi) S Nahimana	6	6
Q	(Venezuela) A Gámiz	4	1
3	(Spain) C Bucșa	6	6
6	(France) E Jacquemot	2	6	6
(Spain) A Lázaro García	6	0	4
WC	(France) A Robbe	3	0
(Argentina) ML Carlé	6	6
Q	(Romania) IL Roșca	3	4
(Australia) O Gadecki	6	6
Q	D Shnaider	6	5	6
2	A Blinkova	1	7	3

Second round
7	O Selekhmeteva	6	3	7
Q	M Andreeva	1	6	5
(Burundi) S Nahimana	4	1
3	(Spain) C Bucșa	6	6
6	(France) E Jacquemot	5	6^{7}
(Argentina) ML Carlé	7	7^{9}
(Australia) O Gadecki	6	6
Q	D Shnaider	3	3

Quarterfinals
7	O Selekhmeteva	6	6
3	(Spain) C Bucșa	4	3
(Argentina) ML Carlé	1	6	6
(Australia) O Gadecki	6	4	4

Semifinals
7	O Selekhmeteva	6	7^{8}
(Argentina) ML Carlé	2	6^{6}
