= 2024 Open International Féminin de Montpellier – Doubles =

Doubles
- 2024 Open International Féminin de Montpellier

Final
- Champions: (Croatia) Mariana Dražić; Iryna Shymanovich
- Runners-up: Elena Pridankina; Ekaterina Yashina
- Score: 1–6, 6–4, [10–8]

Events
Singles	Doubles
- Open International Féminin de Montpellier

Amina Anshba and Sofya Lansere were the defending champions but chose not to participate.

Mariana Dražić and Iryna Shymanovich won the title, defeating Elena Pridankina and Ekaterina Yashina in the final, 1–6, 6–4, [10–8].

== Seeds ==
1. (China) Tang Qianhui / (Chinese Taipei) Tsao Chia-yi (quarterfinals)
2. (United States) Jessie Aney / (Germany) Lena Papadakis (quarterfinals)
3. (Romania) Andreea Mitu / (Latvia) Darja Semeņistaja (first round)
4. (United States) Carmen Corley / (United States) Ivana Corley (first round)

== Draw ==
Key

- Q = Qualifier
- WC = Wild card
- LL = Lucky loser
- Alt = Alternate
- ITF = ITF entry
- PR = Protected ranking
- SR = Special ranking
- SE = Special exempt
- JE = Junior exempt
- JR = Junior Accelerator Programme entrant
- CO = College Accelerator Programme entrant
- NG = Next Gen Accelerator Program entrant
- w/o = Walkover
- r = Retired
- d = Defaulted

First round
1	(China) Q Tang (Chinese Taipei) C-y Tsao	6	6
(France) M Rouvroy (France) A Zenbi	2	1
(France) S Biolay (France) M Leclercq	4	5
E Pridankina; E Yashina	6	7
3	(Romania) A Mitu (Latvia) D Semeņistaja	6	2	[11]
(United Kingdom) M Brooks (Lithuania) J Mikulskytė	4	6	[13]
(France) J Lim (India) V Shinde	2	5
(France) A Hesse (France) S Janicijevic	6	7
(United Kingdom) L John-Baptiste (Australia) A Osborne	1	1
(Algeria) I Ibbou (Burundi) S Nahimana	6	6
(France) A Albié (France) E Léné	6	7^{7}
4	(United States) C Corley (United States) I Corley	2	6^{4}
(Croatia) M Dražić; I Shymanovich	3	7^{7}	[10]
(Netherlands) I Haverlag (United States) C Rosca	6	6^{3}	[5]
(France) É Dartron (France) TS Rakotomanga Rajaonah	2	4
2	(United States) J Aney (Germany) L Papadakis	6	6

Quarterfinals
1	(China) Q Tang (Chinese Taipei) C-y Tsao	7^{7}	0	[7]
E Pridankina; E Yashina	6^{4}	6	[10]
(United Kingdom) M Brooks (Lithuania) J Mikulskytė	4	1
(France) A Hesse (France) S Janicijevic	6	6
(Algeria) I Ibbou (Burundi) S Nahimana	7^{7}	6^{5}	[10]
(France) A Albié (France) E Léné	6^{3}	7^{7}	[3]
(Croatia) M Dražić; I Shymanovich	7^{7}	1	[12]
2	(United States) J Aney (Germany) L Papadakis	6^{2}	6	[10]

Semifinals
E Pridankina; E Yashina	6	6
(France) A Hesse (France) S Janicijevic	4	4
(Algeria) I Ibbou (Burundi) S Nahimana	6^{6}	1
(Croatia) M Dražić; I Shymanovich	7^{8}	6

Final
E Pridankina; E Yashina	6	4	[8]
(Croatia) M Dražić; I Shymanovich	1	6	[10]
