= Mariana Dražić =

Croatian tennis player (born 1995)

- Country (sports): Croatia
- Born: 8 January 1995 (age 31) Makarska, Croatia
- Plays: Right (two-handed backhand)
- Prize money: $91,189

Singles
- Career record: 172–199
- Career titles: 0
- Highest ranking: No. 692 (28 November 2016)

Doubles
- Career record: 250–220
- Career titles: 19 ITF
- Highest ranking: No. 226 (18 September 2023)
- Current ranking: No. 445 (16 November 2026)
- Last updated on: 20 November 2026.

Mariana Dražić (born 8 January 1995) is a Croatian tennis player who has specialized in doubles since 2024.

Dražić has a career-high doubles ranking of 226, achieved on 18 September 2023. She has won 19 doubles titles on the ITF Women's Circuit.

Dražić made her WTA Tour main-draw debut at the 2023 Jasmin Open, partnering with Latvian player Darja Semeņistaja.

== Personal life ==
Dražić was born in Makarska. She started to practice in Brela at the small tennis club at the age of eight. Her father Darko Dražić is a former football player, member of first Croatian national team back in 1990, and Hajduk Split legend and first captain in independent Croatia. Her sister Antonia is a tennis referee.

== ITF Circuit finals ==
=== Doubles: 40 (19 titles, 21 runner-ups) ===
Legend W75 tournaments (1–0) W40/50 tournaments (0–2) W25/35 tournaments (2–2) W10/15 tournaments (16–17)	Finals by surface Hard (5–7) Clay (14–14)

Result	W–L	Date	Tournament	Tier	Surface	Partner	Opponents	Score
Win	1–0	Sep 2015	ITF Bol, Croatia	W10	Clay	(North Macedonia) Lina Gjorcheska	(Germany) Julia Wachaczyk (Netherlands) Mandy Wagemaker	7–6^{(5)}, 6–3
Loss	1–1	Jun 2016	ITF Antalya, Turkey	W10	Hard	(Russia) Daria Lodikova	(France) Caroline Roméo (Ukraine) Alyona Sotnikova	3–6, 3–6
Loss	1–2	Aug 2016	ITF St. Pölten, Austria	W10	Clay	(Austria) Janina Toljan	(Poland) Justyna Jegiołka (Hungary) Vanda Lukács	4–6, 6–4, [9–11]
Loss	1–3	Sep 2016	ITF Melilla, Spain	W10	Clay	(Romania) Cristina Adamescu	(France) Fiona Codino (Belgium) Mathilde Devits	6–7^{(2)}, 7–5, [5–10]
Win	2–3	Sep 2016	ITF Melilla, Spain	W10	Clay	(Hungary) Panna Udvardy	(Italy) Marianna Natali (Germany) Lisa Ponomar	6–1, 2–0 ret.
Win	3–3	Oct 2016	ITF Bol, Croatia	W10	Clay	(Hungary) Rebeka Stolmár	(Croatia) Lea Bošković (Norway) Malene Helgø	7–6^{(5)}, 7–6^{(5)}
Loss	3–4	Oct 2016	ITF Bol, Croatia	W10	Clay	(Croatia) Ani Mijačika	(Croatia) Lea Bošković (Slovenia) Kaja Juvan	6–4, 5–7, [4–10]
Loss	3–5	May 2017	ITF Antalya, Turkey	W15	Clay	(Uzbekistan) Arina Folts	(Denmark) Emilie Francati (United States) Dasha Ivanova	2–6, 4–6
Loss	3–6	May 2017	ITF Antalya, Turkey	W15	Clay	(Denmark) Emilie Francati	(Romania) Georgia Crăciun (Romania) Ilona Georgiana Ghioroaie	2–6, 4–6
Win	4–6	Sep 2017	ITF Shymkent, Kazakhstan	W15	Clay	(Kyrgyzstan) Ksenia Palkina	(Kazakhstan) Dariya Detkovskaya (Kazakhstan) Zhibek Kulambayeva	7–5, 3–6, [10–8]
Win	5–6	Sep 2017	ITF Shymkent, Kazakhstan	W15	Clay	(Kyrgyzstan) Ksenia Palkina	(Kazakhstan) Dariya Detkovskaya (Kazakhstan) Zhibek Kulambayeva	7–5, 6–2
Loss	5–7	Oct 2017	ITF Hammamet, Tunisia	W15	Clay	(Bulgaria) Isabella Shinikova	(Croatia) Lea Bošković (France) Yasmine Mansouri	6–1, 4–6, [6–10]
Win	6–7	Nov 2017	ITF Beni Mellal, Morocco	W15	Clay	(Romania) Oana Georgeta Simion	(Italy) Federica Arcidiacono (Spain) Olga Parres Azcoitia	6–4, 6–2
Loss	6–8	Nov 2017	ITF Agadir, Morocco	W15	Clay	(Romania) Oana Georgeta Simion	(Austria) Pia König (Italy) Miriana Tona	6–4, 6–7^{(5)}, [8–10]
Win	7–8	Jun 2018	ITF Sassuolo, Italy	W15	Clay	(Italy) Maria Masini	(Serbia) Mihaela Đaković (Italy) Beatrice Torelli	6–4, 6–2
Loss	7–9	Jul 2018	ITF Almaty, Kazakhstan	W15	Hard	(Russia) Valeriya Zeleva	(Czech Republic) Anastasia Dețiuc (Kyrgyzstan) Ksenia Palkina	6–7^{(3)}, 4–6
Loss	7–10	Jan 2019	ITF Sharm El Sheikh, Egypt	W15	Hard	(Norway) Malene Helgø	(Czech Republic) Anastasia Dețiuc (Finland) Oona Orpana	0–6, 4–6
Win	8–10	Feb 2019	ITF Sharm El Sheikh, Egypt	W15	Hard	(Norway) Malene Helgø	(Netherlands) Merel Hoedt (Netherlands) Noa Liauw a Fong	6–4, 6–3
Win	9–10	Feb 2019	ITF Sharm El Sheikh, Egypt	W15	Hard	(Sweden) Linnéa Malmqvist	(Russia) Ulyana Ayzatulina (Russia) Alina Silich	7–5, 6–3
Loss	9–11	Mar 2019	ITF Sharm El Sheikh, Egypt	W15	Hard	(Ukraine) Marianna Zakarlyuk	(Russia) Angelina Gabueva (Belarus) Shalimar Talbi	4–6, 4–6
Win	10–11	Aug 2019	ITF Vrnjačka Banja, Serbia	W15	Clay	(Lithuania) Justina Mikulskytė	(Czech Republic) Kristýna Hrabalová (Slovakia) Laura Svatíková	6–2, 7–6^{(5)}
Win	11–11	Oct 2019	ITF Antalya, Turkey	W15	Hard	(North Macedonia) Lina Gjorcheska	(Netherlands) Eva Vedder (Netherlands) Stéphanie Visscher	7–5, 4–6, [10–7]
Win	12–11	Dec 2019	ITF Monastir, Tunisia	W15	Hard	(Norway) Malene Helgø	(Spain) Yvonne Cavallé Reimers (Serbia) Bojana Marinković	7–6^{(4)}, 6–0
Win	13–11	Feb 2021	ITF Antalya, Turkey	W15	Clay	(Romania) Oana Georgeta Simion	(Spain) Jéssica Bouzas Maneiro (Netherlands) Lexie Stevens	4–6, 6–3, [12–10]
Win	14–11	Jun 2021	ITF Monastir, Tunisia	W15	Hard	(Uzbekistan) Sabina Sharipova	(Japan) Saki Imamura (South Korea) Shin Ji-ho	6–7^{(1)}, 6–4, [10–0]
Loss	14–12	Jun 2021	ITF Monastir, Tunisia	W15	Hard	(Netherlands) Noa Liauw a Fong	(United States) Anastasia Nefedova (Czech Republic) Laetitia Pulchartová	5–7, 2–6
Loss	14–13	Jul 2021	ITF Monastir, Tunisia	W15	Hard	(United States) Anastasia Nefedova	(France) Tiphanie Fiquet (Czech Republic) Akvilė Paražinskaitė	5–7, 6–4, [8–10]
Loss	14–14	Nov 2021	ITF Monastir, Tunisia	W15	Hard	(Germany) Julia Middendorf	(France) Yasmine Mansouri (Serbia) Elena Milovanović	6–7^{(4)}, 0–6
Loss	14–15	Dec 2021	ITF Antalya, Turkiye	W15	Clay	(Israel) Jazmín Ortenzi	(Russia) Ksenia Laskutova (Hungary) Amarissa Tóth	4–6, 2–6
Win	15–15	Feb 2022	ITF Antalya, Turkiye	W15	Clay	(Germany) Katharina Hobgarski	(Italy) Angelica Moratelli (Hungary) Amarissa Tóth	7–5, 6–4
Loss	15–16	Sep 2022	ITF Casablanca, Morocco	W15	Clay	Aleksandra Pospelova	(Finland) Laura Hietaranta (Netherlands) Stéphanie Visscher	6–1, 5–7, [8–10]
Win	16–16	Dec 2022	ITF Antalya, Turkiye	W15	Clay	(Hungary) Amarissa Tóth	(Greece) Eleni Christofi; Anna Ureke	1–6, 7–5, [10–4]
Loss	16–17	Dec 2022	ITF Antalya, Turkiye	W15	Clay	(Hungary) Amarissa Tóth	Yana Karpovich; Daria Lodikova	5–7, 2–6
Win	17–17	Apr 2023	ITF Santa Margherita di Pula, Italy	W25	Clay	Anastasia Gasanova	(Kazakhstan) Zhibek Kulambayeva (Greece) Sapfo Sakellaridi	7–5, 6–4
Loss	17–18	May 2023	ITF Otočec, Slovenia	W40	Clay	(United Kingdom) Emily Webley-Smith	(Czech Republic) Dominika Šalková (Slovenia) Veronika Erjavec	5–7, 3–6
Loss	17–19	Aug 2023	ITF Trieste, Italy	W25	Clay	Anastasia Gasanova	(Slovenia) Nika Radišić (Bosnia and Herzegovina) Anita Wagner	1–6, 1–6
Win	18–19	Jun 2024	ITF Périgueux, France	W35	Clay	Alevtina Ibragimova	(France) Émeline Dartron (France) Jenny Lim	7–5, 2–6, [10–5]
Win	19–19	Jul 2024	Open de Montpellier, France	W75	Clay	Iryna Shymanovich	Elena Pridankina; Ekaterina Yashina	1–6, 6–4, [10–8]
Loss	19–20	May 2025	ITF Bol, Croatia	W35	Clay	Anastasia Gasanova	(Romania) Ilinca Amariei (Brazil) Ana Candiotto	6–7^{(7)}, 2–6
Loss	19–21	Aug 2025	ITF Koksijde, Belgium	W50	Clay	(Italy) Anastasia Abbagnato	(Belgium) Magali Kempen (Czech Republic) Anna Sisková	6–7^{(5)}, 7–5, [6–10]
