= Julia Lohoff =

German tennis player

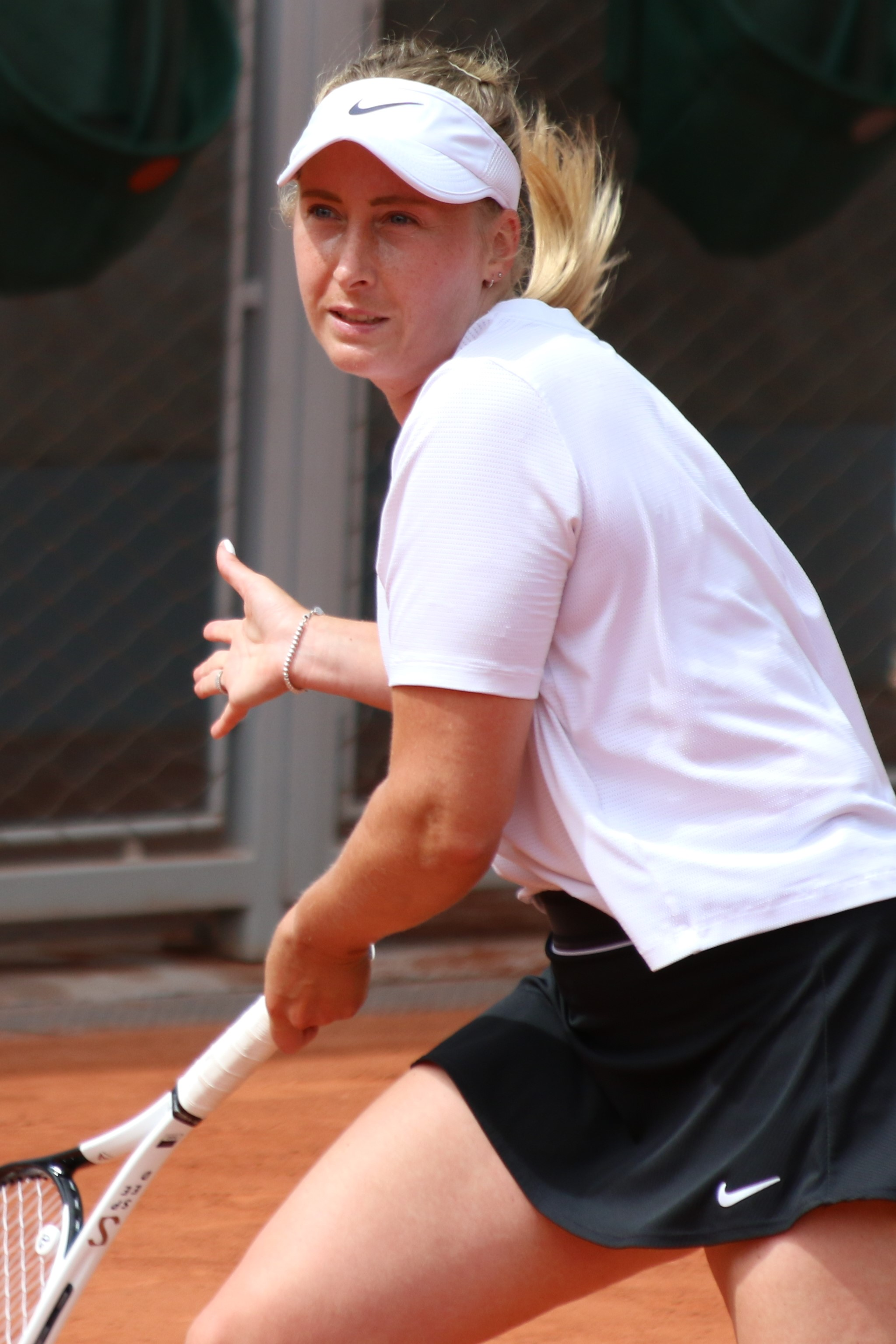
- Lohoff at the 2022 French Open
- Country (sports): Germany
- Born: 13 April 1994 (age 32) Bielefeld, Germany
- Height: 1.66 m (5 ft 5 in)
- Plays: Left-handed (two-handed backhand)
- Prize money: $290,816

Singles
- Career record: 213–178
- Career titles: 0
- Highest ranking: No. 338 (3 April 2017)

Doubles
- Career record: 317–209
- Career titles: 1
- Highest ranking: No. 61 (28 February 2022)

Grand Slam doubles results
- Australian Open: 1R (2022)
- French Open: 1R (2020, 2021, 2022)
- Wimbledon: 2R (2021)
- US Open: 1R (2021)

Julia Lohoff (née Wachaczyk; born 13 April 1994) is a German inactive tennis player. She is a doubles specialist who reached a career-high doubles ranking by the WTA of 61, achieved in February 2022.

Lohoff has won one WTA Tour doubles title, at the 2020 WTA Lyon Open along with one title on the WTA Challenger Tour. She has also won nine singles titles and 33 doubles titles on the ITF Circuit.

== Personal life ==
Since mid-2021, she is married to Tim Lohoff, a biologist and PhD student based in England.

== Doubles performance timeline ==
Key
W	F	SF	QF	#R	RR	Q#	DNQ	A	NH

(W) winner; (F) finalist; (SF) semifinalist; (QF) quarterfinalist; (#R) rounds 4, 3, 2, 1; (RR) round-robin stage; (Q#) qualification round; (DNQ) did not qualify; (A) absent; (NH) not held; (SR) strike rate (events won / competed); (W–L) win–loss record.
To avoid confusion and double counting, these charts are updated at the conclusion of a tournament or when the player's participation has ended.

Only WTA Tour and Grand Slam tournament results are considered in the career statistics.

Current through the 2024 WTA Tour.

Tournament	2018	2019	2020	2021	2022	2023	2024	SR	W–L
Grand Slam tournaments
Australian Open	A	A	A	A	1R	A	A	0 / 1	0–1
French Open	A	A	1R	1R	1R	A	A	0 / 3	0–3
Wimbledon	A	A	NH	2R	1R	A	A	0 / 2	1–2
US Open	A	A	A	1R	A	A	A	0 / 1	0–1
Win–loss	0–0	0–0	0–1	1–3	0–3	0–0	0–0	0 / 7	1–7
WTA 1000 tournaments
Indian Wells Open	A	A	NH	1R	A	A	A	0 / 1	0–1
Madrid Open	A	A	NH	A	1R	A	A	0 / 1	0–1
Canadian Open	A	A	NH	1R	A	A	A	0 / 1	0–1
Career statistics
Tournaments	1	1	5	23	18	5	2	55	
Titles	0	0	1	0	0	0	0	1	
Finals	0	0	1	0	0	0	0	1	
Overall win–loss	0–1	0–1	4–4	17–23	3–18	3–4	0–2	27–53	
Year-end ranking	285	238	115	72	144	142	186	34%	

== WTA Tour finals ==
=== Doubles: 1 (title) ===
Legend WTA 500 International / WTA 250 (1–0)	Finals by surface Hard (1–0) Clay (0–0)

Result	W–L	Date	Tournament	Tier	Surface	Partner	Opponents	Score
Win	1–0	Mar 2020	Lyon Open, France	International	Hard (i)	(Romania) Laura Ioana Paar	(Netherlands) Lesley Pattinama Kerkhove (Netherlands) Bibiane Schoofs	7–5, 6–4

== WTA 125 finals ==
=== Doubles: 2 (1 title, 1 runner-up) ===
Result	W–L	Date	Tournament	Surface	Partner	Opponents	Score
Win	1–0	Nov 2023	Copa Colina, Chile	Clay	(Switzerland) Conny Perrin	(Peru) Lucciana Pérez Alarcón (Chile) Daniela Seguel	7–6^{(7–4)}, 6–2
Loss	1–1	Nov 2023	Brasil Tennis Cup, Brazil	Clay	(Switzerland) Conny Perrin	(Italy) Sara Errani (France) Léolia Jeanjean	5–7, 6–3, [7–10]

== ITF Circuit finals ==
=== Singles: 12 (9 titles, 3 runner-ups) ===
Legend $25,000 tournaments $10/15,000 tournaments (9–3)	Finals by surface Hard (7–3) Clay (2–0)

Result	W–L	Date	Tournament	Tier	Surface	Opponent	Score
Win	1–0	Aug 2013	ITF Ratingen, Germany	10,000	Clay	(Germany) Tamara Korpatsch	6–3, 4–6, 6–4
Win	2–0	Jun 2015	ITF Amarante, Portugal	10,000	Hard	(Italy) Cristiana Ferrando	7–5, 6–4
Win	3–0	Aug 2015	Bursa Cup, Turkey	10,000	Hard	(Turkey) Melis Sezer	6–4, 6–4
Win	4–0	Feb 2016	ITF Sharm El Sheikh, Egypt	10,000	Hard	(Russia) Sofya Zhuk	4–6, 6–4, 6–3
Win	5–0	May 2016	ITF Sharm El Sheikh, Egypt	10,000	Hard	(United Kingdom) Samantha Murray	6–3, 6–4
Win	6–0	Jul 2016	ITF Savitaipale, Finland	10,000	Clay	(Italy) Georgia Brescia	6–4, 6–1
Win	7–0	Nov 2016	ITF Sharm El Sheikh, Egypt	10,000	Hard	(Ukraine) Angelina Shakhraychuk	7–5, 6–1
Loss	7–1	Nov 2016	ITF Sharm El Sheikh, Egypt	10,000	Hard	(Germany) Sarah-Rebecca Sekulic	6–7^{(8–10)}, 4–6
Loss	7–2	Mar 2017	ITF Sharm El Sheikh, Egypt	15,000	Hard	(United Kingdom) Katie Swan	4–6, 5–7
Win	8–2	Mar 2017	ITF Sharm El Sheikh, Egypt	15,000	Hard	(United Kingdom) Jodie Burrage	2–6, 6–3, 6–2
Loss	8–3	Nov 2017	ITF Sharm El Sheikh, Egypt	15,000	Hard	(Italy) Lucia Bronzetti	1–6, 2–6
Win	9–3	Mar 2019	ITF Sharm El Sheikh, Egypt	15,000	Hard	(Netherlands) Indy de Vroome	6–3, 6–2

=== Doubles: 54 (33 titles, 21 runner-ups) ===
Legend $100,000 tournaments (0–1) $80,000 tournaments (1–0) $60,000 tournaments (4–2) $25,000 tournaments (8–8) $10/15,000 tournaments (20–10)	Finals by surface Hard (17–6) Clay (15–13) Carpet (1–2)

Result	W–L	Date	Tournament	Tier	Surface	Partner	Opponents	Score
Loss	0–1	Aug 2010	ITF Enschede, Netherlands	10,000	Clay	(Germany) Carolin Daniels	(Poland) Olga Brózda (Poland) Natalia Kołat	1–6, 3–6
Win	1–1	Sep 2011	ITF Plovdiv, Bulgaria	10,000	Clay	(Germany) Dinah Pfizenmaier	(Switzerland) Clelia Melena (Italy) Stefania Rubini	6–4, 7–5
Win	2–1	Jul 2013	ITF Tampere, Finland	10,000	Clay	(Germany) Nina Zander	(Finland) Emma Laine (Finland) Piia Suomalainen	6–4, 6–4
Loss	2–2	Sep 2013	ITF Huy, Belgium	10,000	Clay	(Germany) Nina Zander	(Germany) Franziska König (Australia) Karolina Wlodarczak	2–6, 4–6
Loss	2–3	Oct 2013	ITF Antalya, Turkey	10,000	Clay	(Belarus) Sviatlana Pirazhenka	(Austria) Pia König (Poland) Barbara Sobaszkiewicz	1–6, 4–6
Loss	2–4	Nov 2013	ITF Manchester, United Kingdom	10,000	Hard (i)	(Netherlands) Eva Wacanno	(United Kingdom) Jocelyn Rae (United Kingdom) Anna Smith	1–6, 4–6
Loss	2–5	Jun 2014	ITF Rome, Italy	10,000	Clay	(Germany) Luisa Marie Huber	(Switzerland) Lisa Sabino (Italy) Alice Savoretti	7–6^{(7–3)}, 5–7, [5–10]
Loss	2–6	Sep 2014	ITF Bol, Croatia	10,000	Clay	(Netherlands) Gabriela van de Graaf	(Slovakia) Vivien Juhászová (Slovakia) Barbara Kötelešová	6–2, 1–6, [7–10]
Win	3–6	Nov 2014	ITF Heraklion, Greece	10,000	Hard	(Poland) Natalia Siedliska	(Bosnia and Herzegovina) Anita Husarić (France) Marine Partaud	6–2, 6–7^{(2–7)}, [10–6]
Win	4–6	Aug 2015	Bursa Cup, Turkey	10,000	Hard	(Germany) Nora Niedmers	(Germany) Katharina Hering (United Kingdom) Mirabelle Njoze	6–1, 6–1
Win	5–6	Aug 2015	ITF İzmir, Turkey	10,000	Hard	(Germany) Nora Niedmers	(Turkey) Ayla Aksu (Uzbekistan) Arina Folts	7–6^{(7–4)}, 6–4
Win	6–6	Sep 2015	ITF Bol, Croatia	10,000	Clay	(Czech Republic) Lenka Kunčíková	(Switzerland) Karin Kennel (Croatia) Iva Primorac	6–3, 4–6, [10–6]
Loss	6–7	Sep 2015	ITF Bol, Croatia	10,000	Clay	(Netherlands) Mandy Wagemaker	(Croatia) Mariana Dražić (North Macedonia) Lina Gjorcheska	6–7^{(5–7)}, 3–6
Win	7–7	Oct 2015	ITF Heraklion, Greece	10,000	Hard	(Ukraine) Veronika Kapshay	(France) Estelle Cascino (Spain) María Martínez Martínez	6–2, 6–4
Win	8–7	Nov 2015	ITF El Kantaoui, Tunisia	10,000	Hard	(Russia) Margarita Lazareva	(Hungary) Bianka Békefi (Hungary) Szabina Szlavikovics	6–4, 6–4
Win	9–7	Feb 2016	ITF Sharm El Sheikh, Egypt	10,000	Hard	(Germany) Nora Niedmers	(Egypt) Ola Abou Zekry (Kazakhstan) Kamila Kerimbayeva	6–2, 6–2
Loss	9–8	Feb 2016	ITF Sharm El Sheikh, Egypt	10,000	Hard	(Germany) Nora Niedmers	(Belgium) Britt Geukens (Romania) Oana Georgeta Simion	6–2, 3–6, [7–10]
Win	10–8	Apr 2016	ITF Sharm El Sheikh, Egypt	10,000	Hard	(Austria) Melanie Klaffner	(United Kingdom) Katie Boulter (Ukraine) Oleksandra Korashvili	6–4, 2–6, [13–11]
Win	11–8	Jun 2016	ITF Kaltenkirchen, Germany	10,000	Clay	(Germany) Katharina Hobgarski	(Hungary) Bianka Békefi (Ecuador) Charlotte Römer	6–4, 6–2
Loss	11–9	Jun 2016	ITF Middelburg, Netherlands	25,000	Clay	(Greece) Valentini Grammatikopoulou	(Netherlands) Quirine Lemoine (Netherlands) Eva Wacanno	3–6, 5–7
Win	12–9	Jul 2016	ITF Tampere, Finland	10,000	Clay	(Finland) Emma Laine	(Finland) Mia Eklund (Germany) Katharina Hering	6–2, 6–3
Win	13–9	Nov 2016	ITF Sharm El Sheikh, Egypt	10,000	Hard	(Bulgaria) Julia Terziyska	(Hungary) Bianka Békefi (Hungary) Szabina Szlavikovics	6–4, 4–6, [10–1]
Win	14–9	Nov 2016	ITF Sharm El Sheikh, Egypt	10,000	Hard	(Serbia) Barbara Bonić	(Romania) Elena–Teodora Cadar (Belgium) Britt Geukens	7–5, 4–6, [10–6]
Loss	14–10	Feb 2017	ITF Edgbaston, United Kingdom	15,000	Hard (i)	(Norway) Melanie Stokke	(United Kingdom) Sarah Beth Grey (United Kingdom) Olivia Nicholls	3–6, 7–5, [7–10]
Win	15–10	Mar 2017	ITF Sharm El Sheikh, Egypt	15,000	Hard	(Ukraine) Veronika Kapshay	(Turkey) Pemra Özgen (Croatia) Ana Vrljić	6–4, 2–6, [10–5]
Loss	15–11	Jun 2017	ITF Hammamet, Tunisia	15,000	Clay	(France) Victoria Muntean	(Slovakia) Barbara Kötelesová (Sweden) Kajsa Rinaldo Persson	6–7^{(5–7)}, 6–4, [7–10]
Loss	15–12	Jul 2017	ITF Lund, Sweden	25,000	Clay	(Romania) Laura Ioana Andrei	(Sweden) Ida Jarlskog (Sweden) Fanny Östlund	2–6, 7–6^{(7–4)}, [12–14]
Win	16–12	Jul 2017	Reinert Open Versmold, Germany	60,000	Clay	(Germany) Katharina Gerlach	(Japan) Misa Eguchi (Japan) Akiko Omae	4–6, 6–1, [10–7]
Win	17–12	Jul 2017	ITF Aschaffenburg, Germany	25,000	Clay	(Germany) Katharina Hobgarski	(United States) Yuki Kristina Chiang (Germany) Lisa Ponomar	6–3, 2–6, [10–3]
Win	18–12	Aug 2017	ITF Chiswick, United Kingdom	25,000	Hard	(Romania) Laura Ioana Andrei	(United Kingdom) Katy Dunne (Bulgaria) Elitsa Kostova	7–5, 7–5
Win	19–12	Nov 2017	ITF Sharm El Sheikh, Egypt	15,000	Hard	(Denmark) Emilie Francati	(Sweden) Linnéa Malmqvist (Hungary) Naomi Totka	7–6^{(8–6)}, 6–7^{(7–9)}, [10–3]
Win	20–12	Nov 2017	ITF Sharm El Sheikh, Egypt	15,000	Hard	(Germany) Romy Kölzer	(Poland) Paulina Czarnik (China) Wang Danni	6–3, 7–5
Loss	20–13	Jun 2018	ITF Óbidos, Portugal	25,000	Carpet	(Romania) Laura–Ioana Andrei	(Russia) Amina Anshba (Georgia (country)) Sofia Shapatava	7–6^{(7–4)}, 0–6, [9–11]
Win	21–13	Jun 2018	Bredeney Ladies Open, Germany	25,000	Clay	(Germany) Katharina Gerlach	(Latvia) Diāna Marcinkēviča (South Africa) Chanel Simmonds	6–4, 2–6, [10–6]
Win	22–13	Aug 2018	ITF Braunschweig, Germany	25,000	Clay	(Czech Republic) Anastasia Zarycká	(Sweden) Cornelia Lister (Latvia) Diāna Marcinkēviča	6–4, 3–6, [11–9]
Win	23–13	Jan 2019	ITF Stuttgart, Germany	15,000	Hard (i)	(Romania) Laura Ioana Paar	(Luxembourg) Eléonora Molinaro (Latvia) Daniela Vismane	7–5, 6–0
Win	24–13	Mar 2019	ITF Sharm El Sheikh, Egypt	15,000	Hard	(Austria) Melanie Klaffner	(Netherlands) Merel Hoedt (Netherlands) Noa Liauw a Fong	6–2, 6–2
Win	25–13	Mar 2019	ITF Sharm El Sheikh, Egypt	15,000	Hard	(Russia) Angelina Gabueva	(Sweden) Linnea Malmqvist (Russia) Alina Silich	7–5, 7–6^{(7–5)}
Loss	25–14	Jun 2019	Open de Montpellier, France	25,000	Clay	(Uzbekistan) Albina Khabibulina	(Russia) Marina Melnikova (Netherlands) Eva Wacanno	6–4, 4–6, [3–10]
Win	26–14	Jul 2019	ITF Horb, Germany	25,000	Clay	(Germany) Katharina Gerlach	(Uzbekistan) Albina Khabibulina (Georgia (country)) Sofia Shapatava	6–1, 6–3
Loss	26–15	Sep 2019	ITF Frýdek-Místek, Czech Republic	25,000	Clay	(Romania) Oana Georgeta Simion	(Croatia) Lea Bošković (Greece) Despina Papamichail	3–6, 2–6
Loss	26–16	Sep 2019	ITF Roehampton, United Kingdom	25,000	Hard	(Germany) Sarah-Rebecca Sekulic	(United Kingdom) Anna Smith (United Kingdom) Samantha Murray Sharan	4–6, 3–6
Win	27–16	Oct 2019	ITF Seville, Spain	25,000	Clay	(Belgium) Marie Benoît	(Spain) Eva Guerrero Álvarez (Netherlands) Arantxa Rus	6–0, 6–7^{(3–7)}, [10–4]
Win	28–16	Nov 2019	ITF Pétange, Luxembourg	25,000	Hard (i)	(Romania) Laura Ioana Paar	(Poland) Katarzyna Piter (Netherlands) Arantxa Rus	7–6^{(13–11)}, 1–6, [11–9]
Loss	28–17	Nov 2019	ITF Saint–Étienne, France	25,000	Hard (i)	(Spain) Cristina Bucșa	(Russia) Marina Melnikova (Romania) Laura Ioana Paar	3–6, 7–6^{(9–7)}, [9–11]
Loss	28–18	Feb 2020	Grenoble Open, France	25,000	Hard (i)	(United Kingdom) Samantha Murray Sharan	(France) Amandine Hesse (France) Elixane Lechemia	3–6, 6–4, [11–13]
Win	29–18	Sep 2020	Open de Cagnes-sur-Mer, France	80,000	Clay	(United Kingdom) Samantha Murray Sharan	(Poland) Paula Kania (Poland) Katarzyna Piter	7–5, 6–2
Win	30–18	Feb 2021	AK Ladies Open, Germany	25,000	Carpet (i)	(Poland) Paula Kania-Choduń	(Switzerland) Viktorija Golubic (Switzerland) Ylena In-Albon	7–6^{(7–5)}, 6–4
Win	31–18	Sep 2022	ITF Prague Open, Czech Republic	60,000	Clay	(France) Elixane Lechemia	(Czech Republic) Linda Klimovičová (Czech Republic) Dominika Šalková	7–5, 7–5
Win	32–18	Apr 2023	Chiasso Open, Switzerland	60,000	Clay	(United Kingdom) Emily Appleton	(Romania) Andreea Mitu (Argentina) Nadia Podoroska	6–1, 6–2
Loss	32–19	May 2023	Wiesbaden Open, Germany	100,000	Clay	(United Kingdom) Emily Appleton	(Australia) Jaimee Fourlis (Australia) Olivia Gadecki	1–6, 4–6
Win	33–19	May 2023	Grado Tennis Cup, Italy	60,000	Clay	(United Kingdom) Emily Appleton	Sofya Lansere (Czech Republic) Anna Sisková	3–6, 6–4, [11–9]
Loss	33–20	Jul 2023	Open de Montpellier, France	60,000	Clay	(Romania) Andreea Mitu	Amina Anshba; Sofya Lansere	3–6, 4–6
Loss	33–21	Feb 2024	AK Ladies Open, Germany	60,000	Carpet (i)	(Switzerland) Conny Perrin	(Poland) Maja Chwalińska (Czech Republic) Jesika Malečková	4–6, 5–7
