= Estelle Cascino =

French tennis player (born 1996)

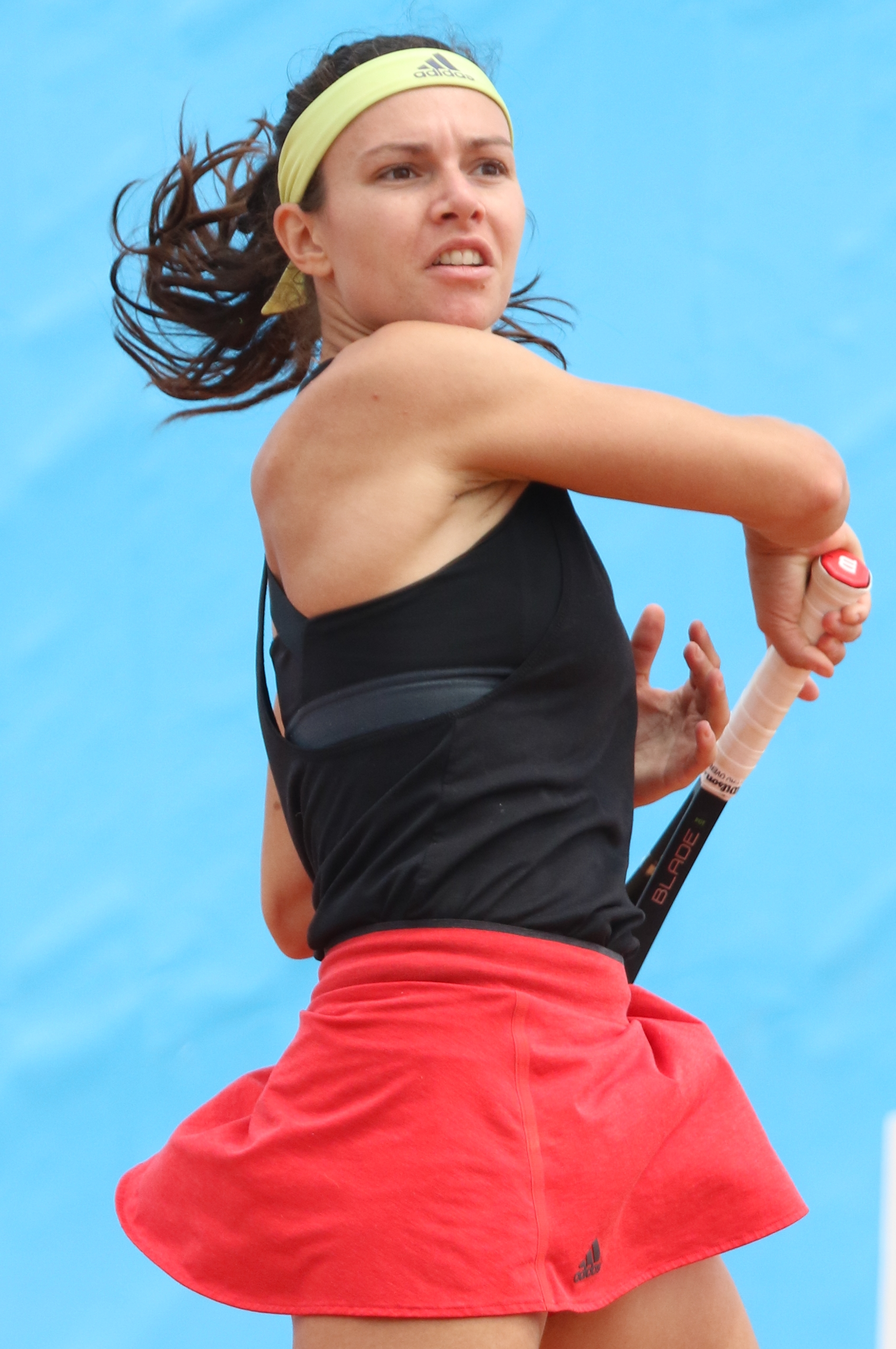
- Cascino at the 2021 Open de Biarritz
- Country (sports): France
- Born: 13 March 1996 (age 30) Marseille, France
- Height: 1.66 m (5 ft 5 in)
- Plays: Right (two-handed backhand)
- Prize money: $307,295

Singles
- Career record: 262–221
- Career titles: 4 ITF
- Highest ranking: No. 406 (25 December 2017)

Grand Slam singles results
- French Open: Q1 (2013, 2014, 2022)

Doubles
- Career record: 305–197
- Career titles: 4 WTA 125, 27 ITF
- Highest ranking: No. 102 (20 April 2026)
- Current ranking: No. 106 (19 October 2026)

Grand Slam doubles results
- French Open: 1R (2019, 2021, 2022, 2023, 2024, 2025, 2026)

Grand Slam mixed doubles results
- French Open: 2R (2025)
- Last updated on: 23 October 2026.

Estelle Cascino (born 13 March 1996) is a French tennis player. She has career-high WTA rankings of 102 in doubles and of 406 in singles. She has won four WTA 125 doubles titles as well as 27 titles in doubles and four in singles on the ITF Women's Circuit.

== Career ==
Cascino made her major main-draw debut at the 2019 French Open, after receiving a wildcard for the doubles tournament, partnering Elixane Lechemia.

She again received a wildcard from the 2023 French Open, partnering Carole Monnet. She also received a wildcard for her mixed doubles debut at the event, partnering with Dan Added.

Partnering Monnet, she received another wildcard in 2024 for the French Open.

Partnering with Feng Shuo, Cascino won her first WTA 125 doubles title at the 2025 Palermo Ladies Open, defeating Momoko Kobori and Ayano Shimizu in the final.

== Grand Slam performance timelines ==
Key
W	F	SF	QF	#R	RR	Q#	DNQ	A	NH

(W) winner; (F) finalist; (SF) semifinalist; (QF) quarterfinalist; (#R) rounds 4, 3, 2, 1; (RR) round-robin stage; (Q#) qualification round; (DNQ) did not qualify; (A) absent; (NH) not held; (SR) strike rate (events won / competed); (W–L) win–loss record.
To avoid confusion and double counting, these charts are updated at the conclusion of a tournament or when the player's participation has ended.

=== Singles ===
Tournament	2013	2014	...	2022	W–L
Australian Open	A	A		A	0–0
French Open	Q1	Q1		Q1	0–0
Wimbledon	A	A		A	0–0
US Open	A	A		A	0–0
Win–Loss	0–0	0–0		0–0	0–0

=== Doubles ===
Tournament	2019	2020	2021	2022	2023	2024	2025	2026	W–L
Australian Open	A	A	A	A	A	A	A	A	0–0
French Open	1R	A	1R	1R	1R	1R	1R	1R	0–7
Wimbledon	A	NH	A	A	A	A	A	A	0–0
US Open	A	A	A	A	A	A	A	A	0–0
Win–Loss	0–1	0–0	0–1	0–1	0–1	0–1	0–1	0–1	0–7

== WTA 125 finals ==
=== Doubles: 10 (4 titles, 6 runner-ups) ===
Result	W–L	Date	Tournament	Surface	Partner	Opponents	Score
Loss	0–1	Dec 2021	Open de Limoges, France	Hard (i)	(France) Jessika Ponchet	(Romania) Monica Niculescu (Russia) Vera Zvonareva	4–6, 4–6
Loss	0–2	May 2022	Open de Saint-Malo, France	Clay	(France) Jessika Ponchet	(Japan) Eri Hozumi (Japan) Makoto Ninomiya	6–7^{(1)}, 1–6
Loss	0–3	May 2024	Open de Saint-Malo, France	Clay	(France) Carole Monnet	(Russia) Amina Anshba (Czech Republic) Anastasia Dețiuc	6–7^{(7)}, 6–2, [5–10]
Win	1–3	Jul 2025	Palermo Ladies Open, Italy	Clay	(China) Feng Shuo	(Japan) Momoko Kobori (Japan) Ayano Shimizu	6–2, 6–7^{(7)}, [10–7]
Win	2–3	Mar 2026	Antalya Challenger, Turkey	Clay	(Argentina) Nicole Fossa Huergo	(Czech Republic) Jesika Malečková (Czech Republic) Miriam Škoch	7–5, 7–6^{(6)}
Loss	2–4	Jun 2026	Foggia Open, Italy	Clay	(Slovenia) Nika Radišić	(Chinese Taipei) Cho I-hsuan (Chinese Taipei) Cho Yi-tsen	6–4, 3–6, [4–10]
Win	3–4	Jul 2026	Contrexéville Open, France	Clay	(Argentina) Nicole Fossa Huergo	(Spain) Yvonne Cavallé Reimers (Brazil) Laura Pigossi	6–7^{(3)}, 6–2, [10–6]
Win	4–4	Jul 2026	ATV Open di Roma, Italy	Clay	(China) Feng Shuo	(Croatia) Lucija Ćirić Bagarić (Slovenia) Nika Radišić	6–4, 6–4
Loss	4–5	Sep 2026	Montreux Ladies Open, Switzerland	Clay	(China) Feng Shuo	(Argentina) Nicole Fossa Huergo (Czech Republic) Lucie Havlíčková	3–6, 7–6^{(4)}, [8–10]
Loss	4–6	Sep 2026	Ljubljana Open, Slovenia	Clay	(China) Feng Shuo	(Croatia) Lucija Ćirić Bagarić (Italy) Angelica Moratelli	7–6^{(4)}, 4–6, [5–10]

== ITF Circuit finals ==
=== Singles: 12 (4 titles, 8 runner-ups) ===
Legend
$10/15,000 tournaments (4–8)

Result	W–L	Date	Tournament	Tier	Surface	Opponent	Score
Loss	0–1	Nov 2012	ITF Guimarães, Portugal	10,000	Hard	(France) Léa Tholey	3–6, 1–6
Loss	0–2	Dec 2012	ITF Potchefstroom, South Africa	10,000	Hard	(Madagascar) Zarah Razafimahatratra	6–7^{(5)}, 0–6
Loss	0–3	Mar 2014	ITF Pula, Italy	10,000	Clay	(Italy) Alice Balducci	3–6, 7–5, 3–6
Loss	0–4	Jan 2015	ITF Port El Kantaoui, Tunisia	10,000	Hard	(France) Myrtille Georges	4–6, 2–6
Win	1–4	Apr 2016	ITF Sharm El Sheikh, Egypt	10,000	Hard	(Russia) Anastasia Pribylova	6–2, 5–7, 6–3
Loss	1–5	Jun 2016	ITF Réunion, France	10,000	Hard	(Netherlands) Chayenne Ewijk	6–1, 4–6, 2–6
Win	2–5	Jun 2016	ITF Grand-Baie, Mauritius	10,000	Hard	(India) Kyra Shroff	3–6, 6–1, 6–3
Loss	2–6	Jan 2017	ITF Saint Martin, France	15,000	Hard	(France) Priscilla Heise	2–6, 2–6
Win	3–6	Jun 2017	ITF Herzliya, Israel	15,000	Hard	(Russia) Marta Paigina	3–6, 7–5, 4–1 ret.
Loss	3–7	Jul 2017	ITF Tel Aviv, Israel	15,000	Hard	(Greece) Despina Papamichail	6–7^{(4)}, 3–6
Loss	3–8	Feb 2019	ITF Monastir, Tunisia	W15	Hard	(France) Lou Brouleau	6–3, 0–6, 3–6
Win	4–8	May 2019	ITF Tabarka, Tunisia	W15	Clay	(France) Léa Tholey	7–6^{(3)}, 7–6^{(3)}

=== Doubles: 51 (27 titles, 24 runner-ups) ===
Legend
W100 tournaments (1–3)
W80 tournaments (0–1)
W60/75 tournaments (9–7)
W40/50 tournaments (0–1)
W25/35 tournaments (7–7)
W10/15 tournaments (10–5)

Result	W–L	Date	Tournament	Tier	Surface	Partner	Opponents	Score
Win	1–0	Jan 2013	ITF Saint Martin, France	10k	Hard	(France) Léa Tholey	(United States) Erin Clark (Canada) Sonja Molnar	6–3, 6–3
Loss	1–1	Jan 2013	ITF Le Gosier, France	10k	Hard	(France) Léa Tholey	(United States) Noelle Hickey (United States) Kady Pooler	0–6, 6–1, [7–10]
Win	2–1	Mar 2013	ITF Le Havre, France	10k	Clay (i)	(Bulgaria) Isabella Shinikova	(Germany) Dejana Raickovic (Germany) Laura Schaeder	0–6, 7–5, [10–5]
Win	3–1	Apr 2013	ITF Les Franqueses del Vallès, Spain	10k	Hard	(Netherlands) Dide Beijer	(Sweden) Cornelia Lister (Italy) Sara Sussarello	6–4, 6–7^{(0)}, [10–6]
Win	4–1	Mar 2014	ITF Antalya, Turkey	10k	Clay	(Czech Republic) Martina Kubičíková	(Italy) Martina Caregaro (Italy) Anna Floris	6–7^{(2)}, 6–2, [10–7]
Win	5–1	Mar 2014	ITF Antalya, Turkey	10k	Clay	(Japan) Mana Ayukawa	(Slovakia) Lenka Juríková (Austria) Janina Toljan	7–5, 7–5
Win	6–1	Jan 2015	ITF Port El Kantaoui, Tunisia	10k	Hard	(Bulgaria) Isabella Shinikova	(Czech Republic) Kristýna Hrabalová (Czech Republic) Vendula Žovincová	7–6^{(3)}, 6–0
Win	7–1	Apr 2015	ITF Port El Kantaoui, Tunisia	10k	Hard	(France) Alice Bacquié	(France) Audrey Albié (France) Carla Touly	6–3, 4–6, [10–5]
Loss	7–2	Oct 2015	ITF Heraklion, Greece	10k	Hard	(Spain) María Martínez Martínez	(Ukraine) Veronika Kapshay (Germany) Julia Wachaczyk	2–6, 4–6
Loss	7–3	Jul 2016	ITF Saint-Gervais, France	10k	Clay	(Oman) Fatma Al-Nabhani	(Australia) Abbie Myers (Australia) Ellen Perez	6–7^{(5)}, 2–6
Win	8–3	Aug 2016	ITF Sezze, Italy	10k	Clay	(India) Kyra Shroff	(Italy) Beatrice Lombardo (France) Carla Touly	6–2, 6–2
Loss	8–4	Oct 2016	ITF Chișinău, Moldova	10k	Clay	(India) Kyra Shroff	(Ukraine) Veronika Kapshay (Ukraine) Angelina Shakhraychuk	3–6, 6–3, [4–10]
Win	9–4	Jul 2017	ITF Tel Aviv, Israel	15k	Hard	(India) Kyra Shroff	(Sweden) Linnéa Malmqvist (Australia) Alexandra Walters	6–2, 6–4
Loss	9–5	Jul 2017	Tampere Open, Finland	15k	Clay	(Belgium) Marie Benoît	(Russia) Anna Iakovleva (Ukraine) Gyulnara Nazarova	w/o
Loss	9–6	Feb 2018	Grenoble Open, France	25k	Hard (i)	(France) Elixane Lechemia	(Switzerland) Amra Sadiković (Netherlands) Eva Wacanno	6–4, 1–6, [6–10]
Win	10–6	Jun 2018	ITF Madrid, Spain	15k	Clay	(Italy) Giorgia Marchetti	(United States) Jessica Ho (Ukraine) Yuliya Lysa	2–6, 6–4, [10–7]
Loss	10–7	Oct 2018	Lagos Open, Nigeria	25k	Hard	(Israel) Deniz Khazaniuk	(Slovakia) Tereza Mihalíková (Bulgaria) Julia Terziyska	7–6^{(4)}, 2–6, [7–10]
Win	11–7	Nov 2018	Open Nantes Atlantique, France	25k	Hard (i)	(France) Elixane Lechemia	(Uzbekistan) Akgul Amanmuradova (Russia) Alina Silich	7–5, 6–4
Win	12–7	Feb 2019	Grenoble Open, France	W25	Hard (i)	(France) Elixane Lechemia	(Romania) Andreea Mitu (Romania) Elena-Gabriela Ruse	6–2, 6–2
Win	13–7	Apr 2019	ITF Calvi, France	W25	Hard	(France) Elixane Lechemia	(Russia) Ekaterina Kazionova (Sweden) Linnéa Malmqvist	6–3, 6–2
Loss	13–8	Jul 2019	ITF Palmela, Portugal	W25	Hard	(Bulgaria) Julia Terziyska	(United Kingdom) Sarah Beth Grey (United Kingdom) Eden Silva	5–7, 2–6
Win	14–8	Jul 2019	ITF Porto, Portugal	W25	Hard	(Bulgaria) Julia Terziyska	(Sweden) Jacqueline Cabaj Awad (Portugal) Inês Murta	7–6^{(0)}, 6–3
Win	15–8	Sep 2019	ITF Pula, Italy	W25	Clay	(Italy) Giorgia Marchetti	(Ukraine) Ganna Poznikhirenko (United States) Chiara Scholl	6–4, 6–3
Loss	15–9	Feb 2020	ITF Mâcon, France	W25	Hard (i)	(Romania) Miriam Bulgaru	(France) Audrey Albié (France) Marine Partaud	6–3, 6–7^{(3)}, [10–12]
Loss	15–10	Feb 2021	ITF Poitiers, France	W25	Hard (i)	(Australia) Seone Mendez	(Italy) Federica di Sarra (Italy) Camilla Rosatello	4–6, 3–6
Win	16–10	May 2021	Open Saint-Gaudens, France	W60	Clay	(France) Jessika Ponchet	(United Kingdom) Eden Silva (Belgium) Kimberley Zimmermann	0–6, 7–5, [10–7]
Win	17–10	Jun 2021	Open de Montpellier, France	W60	Clay	(Italy) Camilla Rosatello	(Chinese Taipei) Liang En-shuo (China) Yuan Yue	6–3, 6–2
Win	18–10	Sep 2021	Montreux Ladies Open, Switzerland	W60	Clay	(Italy) Camilla Rosatello	(Switzerland) Conny Perrin (United Kingdom) Eden Silva	7–6^{(4)}, 6–4
Loss	18–11	Oct 2021	ITF Le Neubourg, France	W80+H	Hard	(United Kingdom) Sarah Beth Grey	(United States) Robin Anderson (France) Amandine Hesse	3–6, 6–7^{(2)}
Loss	18–12	Oct 2021	ITF Cherbourg-en-Cotentin, France	W25+H	Hard (i)	(Italy) Camilla Rosatello	(United Kingdom) Sarah Beth Grey (Netherlands) Arianne Hartono	3–6, 2–6
Win	19–12	Jan 2022	Open Andrézieux-Bouthéon, France	W60	Hard (i)	(France) Jessika Ponchet	(United Kingdom) Alicia Barnett (United Kingdom) Olivia Nicholls	6–4, 6–1
Loss	19–13	Apr 2022	ITF Calvi, France	W25+H	Hard	(France) Jessika Ponchet	(Russia) Sofya Lansere (Ukraine) Valeriya Strakhova	4–6, 6–7^{(5)}
Win	20–13	Apr 2022	ITF Monastir, Tunisia	W25	Hard	(France) Jessika Ponchet	(Russia) Polina Kudermetova (Russia) Sofya Lansere	6–0, 4–6, [10–7]
Loss	20–14	Jul 2022	Open de Montpellier, France	W60	Clay	(Russia) Irina Khromacheva	(Ecuador) Andrea Gámiz (Spain) Andrea Lázaro García	4–6, 6–2, [11–13]
Loss	20–15	Jul 2022	ATV Open di Roma, Italy	W60+H	Clay	(Italy) Camilla Rosatello	(Ecuador) Andrea Gámiz (Netherlands) Eva Vedder	5–7, 6–2, [11–13]
Loss	20–16	Apr 2023	ITF Calvi, France	W40	Hard	(India) Ankita Raina	(United Kingdom) Naiktha Bains (United Kingdom) Maia Lumsden	4–6, 6–3, [7–10]
Loss	20–17	May 2023	Empire Slovak Open, Slovakia	W100	Clay	(Netherlands) Suzan Lamens	(Russia) Amina Anshba (Czech Republic) Anastasia Dețiuc	3–6, 6–4, [4–10]
Loss	20–18	Jul 2023	Open Araba en Femenino, Spain	W100	Hard	(Latvia) Diāna Marcinkēviča	(United Kingdom) Alicia Barnett (United Kingdom) Olivia Nicholls	3–6, 4–6
Loss	20–19	Aug 2023	Internacional de Barcelona, Spain	W60	Hard	(Latvia) Diāna Marcinkēviča	(India) Prarthana Thombare (Russia) Anastasia Tikhonova	6–3, 1–6, [7–10]
Win	21–19	Aug 2023	ITF Leipzig, Germany	W25+H	Clay	(Australia) Seone Mendez	(Russia) Julia Avdeeva (Romania) Arina Vasilescu	6–2, 6–7^{(4)}, [10–8]
Loss	21–20	Aug 2023	Collonge-Bellerive Open, Switzerland	W60	Clay	(Latvia) Diāna Marcinkēviča	(Switzerland) Conny Perrin (Czech Republic) Anna Sisková	6–7^{(4)}, 1–6
Win	22–20	Nov 2023	Bratislava Open, Slovakia	W60	Hard (i)	(Czech Republic) Jesika Malečková	(Czech Republic) Denisa Hindová (Czech Republic) Karolína Kubáňová	6–3, 6–2
Loss	22–21	Dec 2023	Trnava Indoor, Slovakia	W60	Hard (i)	(Czech Republic) Jesika Malečková	(Slovakia) Natália Kročková (Slovakia) Tereza Mihalíková	6–7^{(7)}, 5–7
Win	23–21	Mar 2024	Open de Seine-et-Marne, France	W75	Hard (i)	(Philippines) Alex Eala	(United Kingdom) Maia Lumsden (France) Jessika Ponchet	7–5, 7–6^{(4)}
Loss	23–22	May 2024	Open Saint-Gaudens, Franse	W75+H	Clay	(France) Carole Monnet	(France) Émeline Dartron (France) Tiantsoa Rakotomanga Rajaonah	3–6, 6–1, [10–12]
Loss	23–23	Jun 2024	Open de Biarritz, France	W100	Clay	(France) Carole Monnet	(Romania) Irina Bara (Romania) Andreea Mitu	3–6, 6–3, [7–10]
Win	24–23	Jul 2024	Open Araba en Femenino, Spain	W100	Hard	(Philippines) Alex Eala	(Bulgaria) Lia Karatancheva (Latvia) Darja Semeņistaja	6–3, 2–6, [10–4]
Win	25–23	Sep 2024	Ladies Open Vienna, Austria	W75	Clay	(United Kingdom) Emily Appleton	(Ukraine) Maryna Kolb (Ukraine) Nadiia Kolb	6–4, 7–6^{(1)}
Win	26–23	May 2025	Empire Slovak Open, Slovakia	W75	Clay	(France) Carole Monnet	(Netherlands) Arianne Hartono (India) Prarthana Thombare	6–2, 6–2
Win	27–23	Jun 2025	ITF Bucharest, Romania	W75	Clay	(Romania) Patricia Maria Țig	(India) Riya Bhatia (Burundi) Sada Nahimana	4–6, 6–3, [10–6]
Loss	27–24	Oct 2026	Internationaux Féminins de la Vienne, Franse	W75	Hard (i)	(China) Feng Shuo	(Portugal) Francisca Jorge (Portugal) Matilde Jorge	2–6, 6–7^{(6)}
