= Open International Féminin de Montpellier =

Tennis tournament

- 2024 Open International Féminin de Montpellier

ITF Women's Tour
- Event name: Open International Féminin de Montpellier (2022–); Open Montpellier Méditerranée Métropole Hérault (2006–21)
- Location: Montpellier, France
- Venue: ASCH Tennis
- Category: ITF Women's Circuit
- Surface: Clay
- Draw: 32S/32Q/16D
- Prize money: $60,000
- Website: Official website

The Open International Féminin de Montpellier is a tournament for professional female tennis players played on outdoor clay courts. The event is classified as a $60,000 ITF Circuit event and has been held in Montpellier, France, since 2006.

== Past finals ==
=== Singles ===
Year	Champion	Runner-up	Score
2024	(Poland) Maja Chwalińska	Oksana Selekhmeteva	6–3, 6–2
2023	(France) Clara Burel	(Australia) Astra Sharma	6–3, 7–5
2022	Oksana Selekhmeteva	(Ukraine) Kateryna Baindl	6–3, 5–7, 7–5
2021	(Ukraine) Anhelina Kalinina	(Egypt) Mayar Sherif	6–2, 6–3
2020	Tournament cancelled due to the COVID-19 pandemic		
2019	(Russia) Varvara Gracheva	(United States) Elizabeth Halbauer	6–4, 6–2
2018	(France) Fiona Ferro	(Argentina) Catalina Pella	6–4, 6–3
2017	(Romania) Alexandra Dulgheru	(France) Shérazad Reix	6–2, 6–2
2016	(Switzerland) Jil Teichmann	(Paraguay) Montserrat González	6–2, 7–6^{(8–6)}
2015	(Spain) Lourdes Domínguez Lino	(Spain) Sílvia Soler Espinosa	6–4, 6–3
2014	(Bulgaria) Elitsa Kostova	(Ukraine) Sofiya Kovalets	7–5, 6–1
2013	(Croatia) Ana Konjuh	(Russia) Irina Khromacheva	6–3, 6–1
2012	(France) Séverine Beltrame	(Colombia) Catalina Castaño	6–2, 7–6^{(7–4)}
2011	(Netherlands) Bibiane Schoofs	(Spain) Leticia Costas	6–4, 6–4
2010	(France) Mathilde Johansson	(France) Claire de Gubernatis	5–7, 6–4, 6–2
2009	(France) Anaïs Laurendon	(Argentina) María Emilia Salerni	6–3, 6–2
2008	(Argentina) Verónica Spiegel	(China) Lu Jingjing	7–6^{(7–5)}, 6–4
2007	(Italy) Gabriella Polito	(France) Camille Sapène	6–2, 1–6, 6–1
2006	(France) Olivia Sanchez	(France) Stéphanie Vongsouthi	6–7^{(6–8)}, 6–0, 6–0

=== Doubles ===
Year	Champions	Runners-up	Score
2024	(Croatia) Mariana Dražić; Iryna Shymanovich	Elena Pridankina; Ekaterina Yashina	1–6, 6–4, [10–8]
2023	Amina Anshba; Sofya Lansere	(Germany) Julia Lohoff (Romania) Andreea Mitu	6–3, 6–4
2022	(Venezuela) Andrea Gámiz (Spain) Andrea Lázaro García	(France) Estelle Cascino; Irina Khromacheva	6–4, 2–6, [13–11]
2021	(France) Estelle Cascino (Italy) Camilla Rosatello	(Chinese Taipei) Liang En-shuo (China) Yuan Yue	6–3, 6–2
2020	Tournament cancelled due to the COVID-19 pandemic		
2019	(Russia) Marina Melnikova (Netherlands) Eva Wacanno	(Uzbekistan) Albina Khabibulina (Germany) Julia Wachaczyk	4–6, 6–4, [10–3]
2018	(France) Elixane Lechemia (France) Alice Ramé	(Brazil) Carolina Meligeni Alves (Italy) Martina Colmegna	6–7^{(5–7)}, 6–2, [10–6]
2017	(Japan) Momoko Kobori (Japan) Ayano Shimizu	(Brazil) Laura Pigossi (Mexico) Victoria Rodríguez	6–3, 4–6, [10–7]
2016	(India) Prarthana Thombare (Netherlands) Eva Wacanno	(Spain) Lourdes Domínguez Lino (Switzerland) Jil Teichmann	7–5, 2–6, [11–9]
2015	(Argentina) María Irigoyen (Czech Republic) Barbora Krejčíková	(Germany) Laura Siegemund (Czech Republic) Renata Voráčová	6–4, 6–2
2014	(Spain) Inés Ferrer Suárez (Spain) Sara Sorribes Tormo	(Chinese Taipei) Hsu Chieh-yu (Bulgaria) Elitsa Kostova	2–6, 6–3, [12–10]
2013	(Russia) Irina Khromacheva (Czech Republic) Renata Voráčová	(Spain) Inés Ferrer Suárez (Brazil) Paula Cristina Gonçalves	6–1, 6–4
2012	(France) Séverine Beltrame (France) Laura Thorpe	(Argentina) Mailen Auroux (Argentina) María Irigoyen	4–6, 6–4, [10–6]
2011	(Brazil) Paula Cristina Gonçalves (Ukraine) Maryna Zanevska	(Spain) Inés Ferrer Suárez (Romania) Mădălina Gojnea	6–4, 7–5
2010	(China) Lu Jingjing (Germany) Laura Siegemund	(France) Amandine Hesse (Ukraine) Lyudmyla Kichenok	6–4, 6–2
2009	(Ukraine) Yuliya Beygelzimer (Germany) Laura Siegemund	(Switzerland) Stefania Boffa (United States) Story Tweedie-Yates	6–4, 6–1
2008	(China) Lu Jingjing (Argentina) Verónica Spiegel	(France) Shérazad Benamar (France) Charlotte Rodier	7–5, 6–7^{(5–7)}, [10–7]
2007	(France) Émilie Bacquet (France) Nadège Vergos	(Belarus) Tatsiana Kapshay (Ukraine) Kateryna Polunina	5–7, 6–4, 6–3
2006	(France) Claire Jalade (France) Amandine Singla	(France) Marie-Perrine Baudouin (France) Anaïs Laurendon	4–6, 6–3, 6–1
