= Oksana Selekhmeteva =

Spanish tennis player (born 2003)

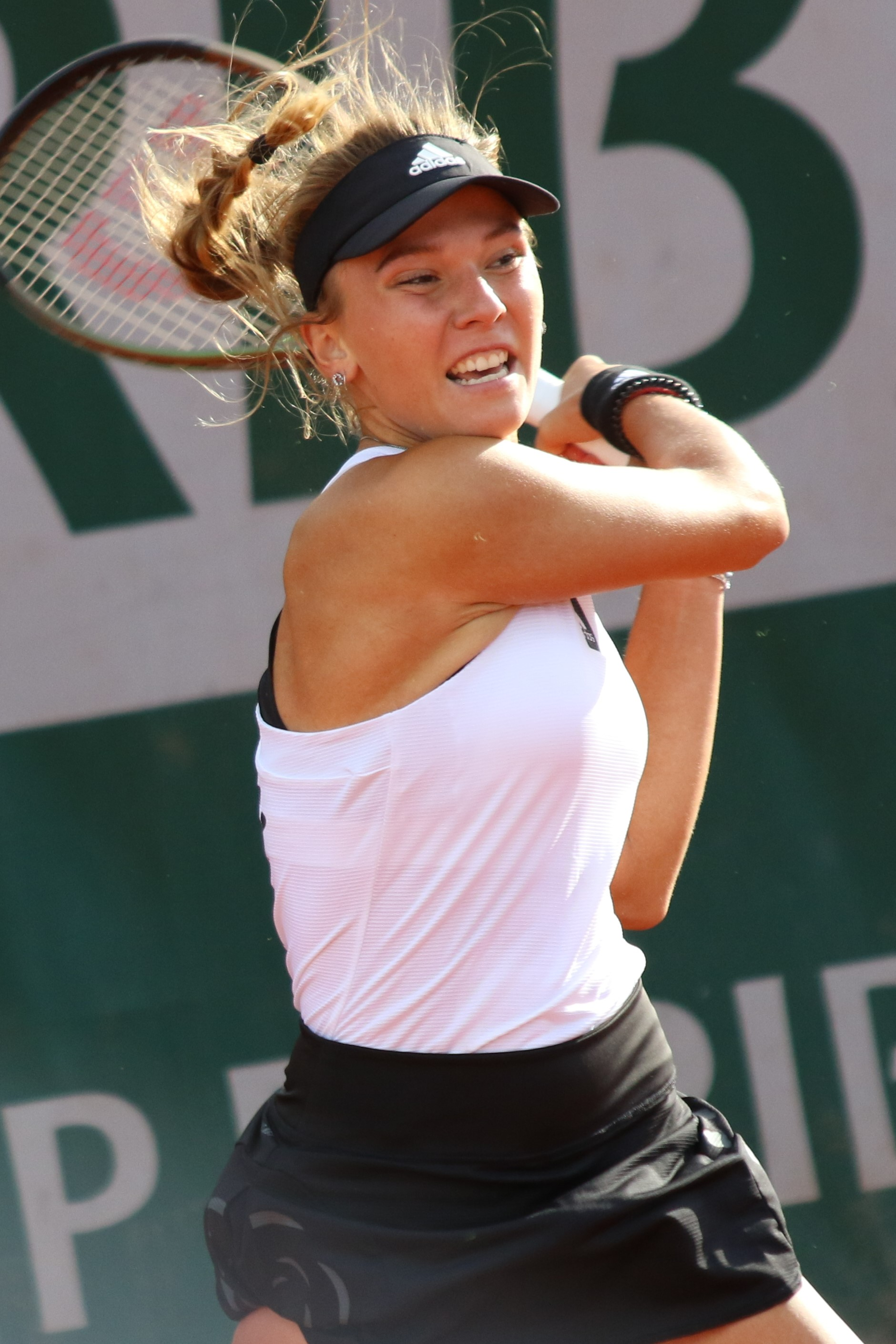
- Selekhmeteva at the 2022 French Open
- Full name: Oksana Olegovna Selekhmeteva
- Country (sports): Russia (2018–2026); Spain (2026–)
- Residence: Barcelona, Spain
- Born: 13 January 2003 (age 23) Kamenka, Penza Oblast, Russia
- Height: 1.70 m (5 ft 7 in)
- Turned pro: 2019
- Plays: Left-handed (two-handed backhand)
- Coach: Diego Dinomo
- Prize money: $1,686,032

Singles
- Career record: 231–132
- Career titles: 2 WTA 125
- Highest ranking: No. 71 (2 March 2026)
- Current ranking: No. 101 (19 October 2026)

Grand Slam singles results
- Australian Open: 3R (2026)
- French Open: 1R (2022, 2025, 2026)
- Wimbledon: 2R (2026)
- US Open: 2R (2026)

Doubles
- Career record: 74–36
- Career titles: 1 WTA 125
- Highest ranking: No. 150 (11 July 2022)
- Current ranking: No. 248 (19 October 2026)

Grand Slam doubles results
- French Open: 2R (2026)
- Last updated on: 23 October 2026.

Oksana Olegovna Selekhmeteva (Russian: Окса́на Оле́говна Селехме́тьева; Russian pronunciation: [ɐˈksanə sʲɪlʲɪˈxmʲetʲɪ̯ɪvə]; born 13 January 2003) is a Russian-born Spanish tennis player. She has a career-high singles ranking by the WTA of No. 71, achieved on 2 March 2026, and a best doubles ranking of No. 150, reached on 11 July 2022.

Selekhmeteva won two junior Grand Slam titles in doubles – the 2019 US Open and 2021 French Open. She also reached the final of the 2019 Wimbledon girls' doubles tournament.

== Juniors ==
As a junior, Selekhmeteva posted a 78–44 win–loss record in singles and 83–31 in doubles, and reached as high as world No. 7 in the combined junior rankings in January 2021.

She won two junior Grand Slam doubles titles (each on a different surface) with two different partners – 2019 US Open with Kamilla Bartone and 2021 French Open with Alexandra Eala. She also finished runner-up at the 2019 Wimbledon Championships, partnering with Bartone.

She competed for the Russian team at the 2018 Summer Youth Olympics, reaching quarterfinals as an unseeded player and being the only player to win a set off eventual gold medalist, Kaja Juvan.

=== Grand Slam performance ===
==== Singles ====
- Australian Open: 1R (2020)
- French Open: SF (2021)
- Wimbledon: 2R (2019)
- US Open: SF (2019)

==== Doubles ====
- Australian Open: QF (2020)
- French Open: W (2021)
- Wimbledon: F (2019)
- US Open: W (2019)

== Professional ==
=== 2018–2019: ITF Circuit & WTA Tour debuts ===
In 2018, Selekhmeteva competed in her first professional tournament at the $15k event in Sant Cugat, qualifying for the main draw defeating two top 800 oppositions despite being unranked. It was her only professional tournament of the year.

She played more ITF tournaments in 2019 while simultaneously competing in the junior events. She made her WTA Tour debut at the St. Petersburg Trophy but lost to world No. 194, Magdalena Fręch, in a tight three-setter. She then backed it up with her first quarterfinal at the $25k level, defeating third seed Olga Ianchuk to reach the quarterfinals at the RWB Ladies Cup.

She competed in her second tour tournament at the Kremlin Cup having received another wildcard into the qualifying draw. This time, she lost to good friend Polina Kudermetova, in straight sets.

Selekhmeteva ended the year ranked 781, having accumulated a 10–8 win–loss record at the professional level.

=== 2020: First doubles title ===
She had to wait until September to reach her first singles quarterfinal of the year at the $25k event in Marbella after the tour was halted due to the COVID-19 pandemic. Her first professional ITF title came at the same tournament, alongside Alina Charaeva. She reached another $25k quarterfinal in Las Palmas, Gran Canaria, this time defeating top 300 players Daniela Seguel and Amandine Hesse.

Selekhmeteva ended the year with a 17–8 win–loss record in singles, and three doubles titles (14–1 win–loss).

=== 2021: First ITF Circuit singles title, top 250 ===
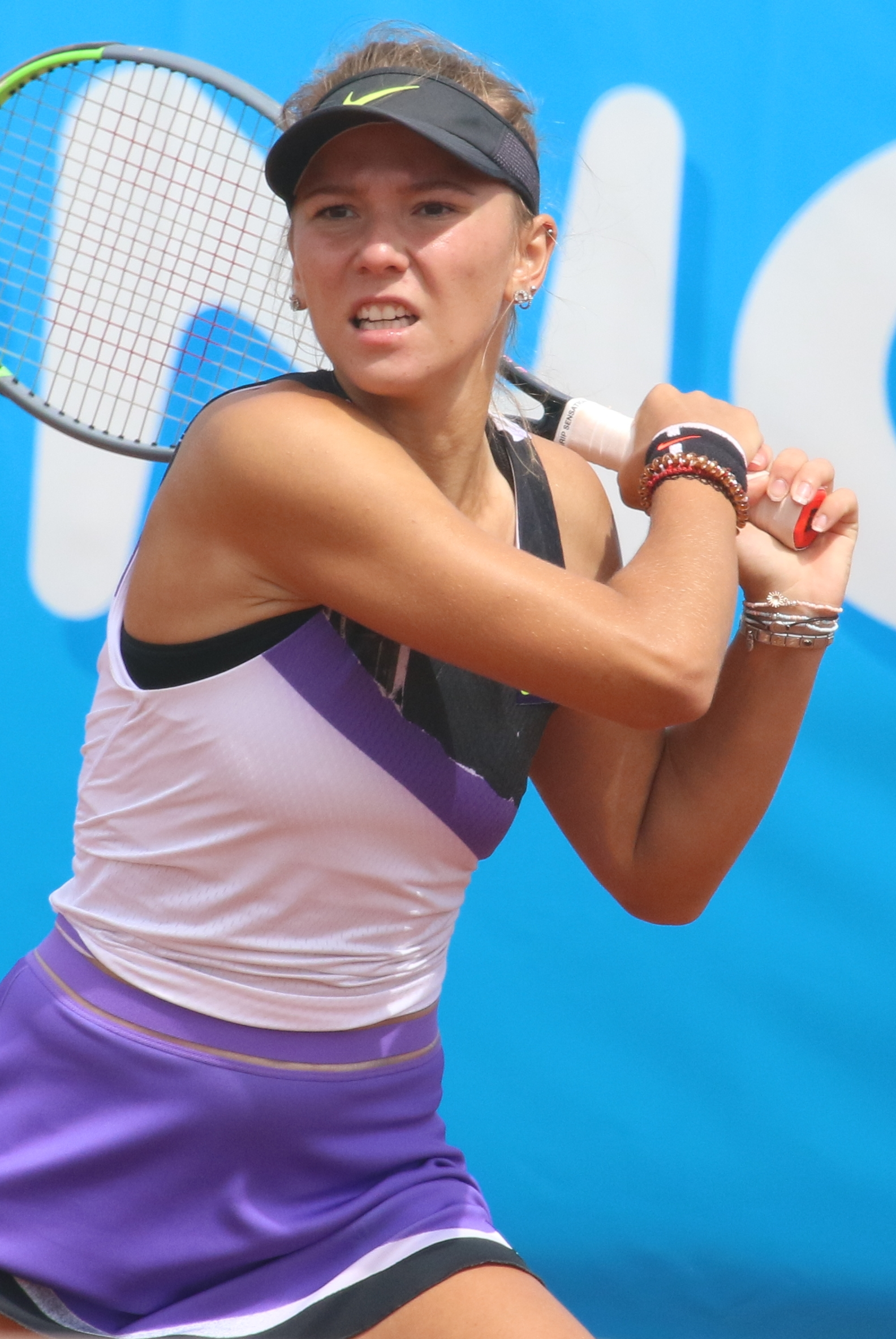
Selekhmeteva in 2021

Selekhmeteva reached her first professional singles final at the $15k event in Manacor, defeating good friend Alex Eala along the way. She defeated Suzan Lamens in straight sets in the final. In doubles, she enjoyed a 19-match winning streak which started from 2020, picking up two titles in Manacor alongside Ángela Fita Boluda.

After reaching the semifinals of the French Open in the junior tournament and winning the doubles title alongside Eala, she concentrated on her professional career and did not play any more junior events. Her first event after was the $60k Open de Montpellier, reaching the biggest quarterfinal of her career after losing just 15 games, including qualifying. She lost to second seed Mayar Sherif, in straight sets. She entered the $100k Cotrexéville Open, where she qualified for the main draw and earned the biggest win of her career over world No. 98, Martina Trevisan, Roland Garros quarterfinalist a year ago, in the first round. Three consecutive great runs ended with a runner-up result at the $60k Open de Biarritz, winning six consecutive matches in straight sets from qualifying to reach her biggest career final. She lost to top seed Francesca Jones in the final, but won the doubles title alongside Kamilla Bartone. With these results, Selekhmeteva cracked the top 400 for the first time in her career.

Despite having a month's break, Selekhmeteva returned to reach yet another $60k quarterfinal, this time at the ITF Maspalomas where she fell to Sherif once again, though this time she won a set. She also won the biggest doubles title of her career at this tournament with Elina Avanesyan. She continued to achieve good results, making the singles semifinals at the $80k Open de Valencia, earning two top 200 wins in the process despite needing to qualify for the main draw. Her run ended in the hands of the eventual champion Trevisan. Another doubles final followed, this time partnering Ángela Fita Boluda.

She then reached semifinals of the $80k Le Neubourg event, losing to Anna Bondár in straight sets. By virtue of her results, Selekhmeteva received a wild card into the qualifying draw of the Kremlin Cup where she stunned Arina Rodionova for her first WTA tournament match win. She sealed a spot in her first WTA Tour main draw, defeating Diana Shnaider in straight sets. In the first round, she faced world No. 32, Veronika Kudermetova, in the biggest match of her career, but fell in an entertaining three-set battle.

=== 2022–2025: Major & top 100 debuts, WTA 125 title ===
Selekhmeteva went through qualifying at the 2022 French Open to make her Grand Slam tournament main-draw debut, losing in the first round to Kaja Juvan. She also qualified for the 2023 Australian Open and lost again in the first round.

As a qualifier, she recorded her first WTA Tour main-draw wins in two years, to reach the quarterfinals at the 2024 Prague Open with wins over Barbora Palicová and Kathinka von Deichmann, before losing to Laura Samson in three sets. As a result, she returned to the top 200 on the rankings on 29 July 2024 moving up 50 positions.

Selekhmeteva qualified for the 2025 French Open after three years absence, defeating Lola Radivojević in the last qualifying round. She lost to Markéta Vondroušová in the first round. Selekhmeteva qualified for the 2025 US Open for the first time, defeating Ayana Akli in the last round, before losing to eventual quarterfinalist Markéta Vondroušová in the main draw.

In September 2025, Selekhmeteva won her first WTA 125 title at the Open Internacional de San Sebastián with straight sets victory over Anouk Koevermans in the final. The following month, she claimed her second title at this level by winning the Internazionali di Rovereto, defeating Lucrezia Stefanini in the final. As a result, she reached the top 100 in the WTA singles rankings on 27 October 2025.

=== 2026: Top 100, nationality change to Spain ===
Selekhmeteva secured a direct entry into the 2026 Australian Open beating Paula Badosa in the second round, before losing to Jessica Pegula in the third.

Shortly before the start of the 2026 French Open, Selekhmeteva switched her country of allegiance in tennis from Russia to Spain.

== Performance timeline ==
Key
W	F	SF	QF	#R	RR	Q#	P#	DNQ	A	Z#	PO	G	S	B	NMS	NTI	P	NH

(W) winner; (F) finalist; (SF) semifinalist; (QF) quarterfinalist; (#R) rounds 4, 3, 2, 1; (RR) round-robin stage; (Q#) qualification round; (P#) preliminary round; (DNQ) did not qualify; (A) absent; (Z#) Davis/Fed Cup Zonal Group (with number indication) or (PO) play-off; (G) gold, (S) silver or (B) bronze Olympic/Paralympic medal; (NMS) not a Masters tournament; (NTI) not a Tier I tournament; (P) postponed; (NH) not held; (SR) strike rate (events won / competed); (W–L) win–loss record.
To avoid confusion and double counting, these charts are updated at the conclusion of a tournament or when the player's participation has ended.

Only main-draw results are included in win–loss records.

=== Singles ===
Current through the 2026 US Open.

Tournament	2021	2022	2023	2024	2025	2026	SR	W–L	Win %
Grand Slam tournaments
Australian Open	A	A	1R	A	Q3	3R	0 / 2	2–2	
French Open	A	1R	Q1	Q3	1R	1R	0 / 3	0–3	
Wimbledon	A	A	A	Q2	Q2	2R	0 / 1	1–1	
US Open	A	Q1	A	Q1	1R	2R	0 / 2	1–2	
Win–loss	0–0	0–1	0–1	0–0	0–2	4–4	0 / 8	4–8	
WTA 1000 tournaments
Qatar Open	NTI	A	NTI		A	A	0 / 0	0–0	
Dubai Championships	A	NTI	A	A	A	A	0 / 0	0–0	
Indian Wells Open	A	A	A	A	A	1R	0 / 1	0–1	
Miami Open	A	A	A	A	A	2R	0 / 1	1–1	
Madrid Open	A	A	A	A	Q1	1R	0 / 1	0–1	
Italian Open	A	A	A	A	A	1R	0 / 1	0–1	
Canadian Open	A	A	A	A	A	Q1	0 / 0	0–0	
Cincinnati Open	A	A	A	A	A	Q2	0 / 0	0–0	
China Open	NH		A	A	A		0 / 0	0–0	
Wuhan Open	NH			A	A		0 / 0	0–0	
Career statistics
Tournaments	1	4	1	1	2	8	Career total: 9		
Overall win–loss	0–1	3–4	0–1	2–1	0–2	5–9	0 / 18	10–18	
Year-end ranking	226	174	419	176	97		$1,686,032		

== WTA 125 finals ==
=== Singles: 3 (2 titles, 1 runner-up) ===
Result	W–L	Date	Tournament	Surface	Opponent	Score
Loss	0–1	Jul 2025	ATV Roma Open, Italy	Clay	(Croatia) Petra Marčinko	3–6, 6–4, 3–6
Win	1–1	Sep 2025	Open de San Sebastián, Spain	Clay	(Netherlands) Anouk Koevermans	6–0, 6–4
Win	2–1	Oct 2025	Internazionali di Rovereto, Italy	Hard (i)	(Italy) Lucrezia Stefanini	6–1, 6–1

=== Doubles: 1 (title) ===
Result	Date	Tournament	Surface	Partner	Opponents	Score
Win	Sep 2025	Montreux Ladies Open, Switzerland	Clay	(Switzerland) Simona Waltert	(Netherlands) Arantxa Rus (Romania) Anca Todoni	6–4, 6–1

== ITF Circuit finals ==
=== Singles: 5 (3 titles, 2 runner-ups) ===
Legend W60/75 tournaments (2–2) W15 tournaments (1–0)	Finals by surface Hard (1–0) Clay (2–2)

Result	W–L	Date	Tournament	Tier	Surface	Opponent	Score
Win	1–0	Feb 2021	ITF Manacor, Spain	W15	Hard	(Netherlands) Suzan Lamens	6–3, 6–2
Loss	1–1	Jul 2021	Open de Biarritz, France	W60	Clay	(United Kingdom) Francesca Jones	4–6, 6–7^{(4)}
Win	2–1	Jul 2022	Open de Montpellier, France	W60	Clay	(Ukraine) Kateryna Baindl	6–3, 5–7, 7–5
Loss	2–2	Jul 2024	Open de Montpellier, France	W75	Clay	(Poland) Maja Chwalińska	3–6, 2–6
Win	3–2	Jul 2024	ATV Roma Open, Italy	W75	Clay	(North Macedonia) Lina Gjorcheska	6–1, 7–6^{(3)}

=== Doubles: 14 (8 titles, 6 runner-ups) ===
Legend W80 tournaments (0–1) W60 tournaments (3–3) W25 tournaments (1–1) W15 tournaments (4–1)	Finals by surface Hard (3–2) Clay (5–4)

Result	W–L	Date	Tournament	Tier	Surface	Partner	Opponents	Score
Win	1–0	Sep 2020	ITF Marbella, Spain	W25	Clay	(Russia) Alina Charaeva	(Romania) Miriam Bulgaru (France) Victoria Muntean	6–3, 6–2
Win	2–0	Oct 2020	ITF Platja d'Aro, Spain	W15	Clay	(Russia) Alina Charaeva	(Spain) Alba Carrillo Marín (Spain) Júlia Payola	5–7, 6–1, [10–5]
Win	3–0	Dec 2020	ITF Madrid, Spain	W15	Clay (i)	(Spain) Ángela Fita Boluda	(Chile) Bárbara Gatica (Brazil) Rebeca Pereira	7–6^{(4)}, 1–6, [10–5]
Win	4–0	Jan 2021	ITF Manacor, Spain	W15	Hard	(Spain) Ángela Fita Boluda	(Switzerland) Ylena In-Albon (Switzerland) Valentina Ryser	6–1, 4–6, [10–5]
Loss	4–1	Jan 2021	ITF Manacor, Spain	W15	Hard	(Spain) Ángela Fita Boluda	(Switzerland) Ylena In-Albon (Italy) Camilla Rosatello	6–7^{(3)}, 7–6^{(9)}, [5–10]
Win	5–1	Mar 2021	ITF Manacor, Spain	W15	Hard	(Spain) Ángela Fita Boluda	(Switzerland) Ylena In-Albon (Spain) Rebeka Masarova	6–2, 5–7, [10–8]
Loss	5–2	May 2021	ITF Platja d'Aro, Spain	W25	Clay	(Philippines) Alex Eala	(Romania) Oana Georgeta Simion (Lithuania) Justina Mikulskytė	3–6, 5–7
Win	6–2	Jul 2021	Open de Biarritz, France	W60	Clay	(Latvia) Daniela Vismane	(United Kingdom) Sarah Beth Grey (Belgium) Magali Kempen	6–3, 7–6^{(5)}
Win	7–2	Aug 2021	ITF Tour Gran Canaria, Spain	W60	Clay	(Russia) Elina Avanesyan	(Netherlands) Arianne Hartono (Australia) Olivia Tjandramulia	7–5, 6–2
Loss	7–3	Sep 2021	Internacional de Valencia, Spain	W80	Clay	(Spain) Ángela Fita Boluda	(Belgium) Ysaline Bonaventure (Georgia (country)) Ekaterine Gorgodze	2–6, 6–2, [6–10]
Loss	7–4	Apr 2022	Open de Seine-et-Marne, France	W60	Hard (i)	(Russia) Sofya Lansere	(Netherlands) Isabelle Haverlag (Lithuania) Justina Mikulskytė	4–6, 2–6
Loss	7–5	Apr 2022	Bellinzona Ladies Open, Switzerland	W60	Clay	(Switzerland) Xenia Knoll	(United Kingdom) Alicia Barnett (United Kingdom) Olivia Nicholls	7–6^{(7)}, 4–6, [7–10]
Loss	7–6	Apr 2022	Chiasso Open, Switzerland	W60	Clay	(Spain) Aliona Bolsova	(Czech Republic) Anastasia Dețiuc (Czech Republic) Miriam Kolodziejová	3–6, 6–1, [8–10]
Win	8–6	Jan 2023	Open Andrézieux-Bouthéon, France	W60	Hard (i)	(Russia) Sofya Lansere	(Switzerland) Conny Perrin (Belarus) Iryna Shymanovich	6–3, 6–0

=== Junior Grand Slam tournament finals ===
==== Doubles: 3 (2 titles, 1 runner-up) ====
Result	Year	Tournament	Surface	Partner	Opponents	Score
Loss	2019	Wimbledon	Grass	(Latvia) Kamilla Bartone	(United States) Savannah Broadus (United States) Abigail Forbes	5–7, 7–5, 2–6
Win	2019	US Open	Hard	(Latvia) Kamilla Bartone	(France) Aubane Droguet (France) Séléna Janicijevic	7–5, 7–6^{(8–6)}
Win	2021	French Open	Clay	(Philippines) Alex Eala	(Russia) Maria Bondarenko (Hungary) Amarissa Tóth	6–0, 7–5
