= 2015 Aegon Ilkley Trophy – Women's doubles =

Women's doubles
- 2015 Aegon Ilkley Trophy

Final
- Champions: (Romania) Raluca Olaru (China) Xu Yifan
- Runners-up: (Belgium) An-Sophie Mestach (Netherlands) Demi Schuurs
- Score: 6–3, 6–4

Events
| Singles | men | women |
| Doubles | men | women |
| ← 2014 · | Aegon Ilkley Trophy | · 2016 → |

This was the first edition of the tournament on the 2015 ITF Women's Circuit.

Raluca Olaru and Xu Yifan won the inaugural title, defeating An-Sophie Mestach and Demi Schuurs in the final, 6–3, 6–4.

== Seeds ==
1. (Zimbabwe) Cara Black / (United States) Lisa Raymond (semifinals)
2. (Chinese Taipei) Chuang Chia-jung / (China) Liang Chen (first round)
3. (Japan) Kimiko Date-Krumm / (Luxembourg) Mandy Minella (semifinals)
4. (Romania) Raluca Olaru / (China) Xu Yifan (champions)

== Draw ==
=== Key ===
- Q = Qualifier
- WC = Wild card
- LL = Lucky loser
- Alt = Alternate
- SE = Special exempt
- PR = Protected ranking
- ITF = ITF entry
- JE = Junior exempt
- w/o = Walkover
- r = Retired
- d = Defaulted
- SR = Special ranking

First round
1 | (Zimbabwe) C Black (United States) L Raymond | 6 | 6
WC | (Brazil) PC Gonçalves (Brazil) B Haddad Maia | 3 | 4
(Ukraine) Y Beygelzimer (Ukraine) O Savchuk | 3 | 4
(Japan) S Aoyama (China) Y Wang | 6 | 6
4 | (Romania) R Olaru (China) Y Xu | 6 | 6
(Paraguay) V Cepede Royg (Liechtenstein) S Vogt | 0 | 3
(Japan) E Hozumi (Japan) J Namigata | 5 | 6 | [0]
(France) S Foretz (Israel) S Pe'er | 7 | 1 | [10]
(Chinese Taipei) C-w Chan (Georgia (country)) O Kalashnikova | 7^{7} | 7
WC | (Germany) A Beck (Germany) A-L Friedsam | 6^{3} | 5
WC | (United Kingdom) T Moore (United Kingdom) N Slater | 6 | 5 | [9]
3 | (Japan) K Date-Krumm (Luxembourg) M Minella | 4 | 7 | [11]
(Slovakia) J Husárová (Poland) P Kania | 2 | 6 | [10]
(Belgium) A-S Mestach (Netherlands) D Schuurs | 6 | 3 | [12]
(United States) N Melichar (Ukraine) M Zanevska | 6 | 6
2 | (Chinese Taipei) C-j Chuang (China) C Liang | 4 | 4

Quarterfinals
1 | (Zimbabwe) C Black (United States) L Raymond | 6 | 6
(Japan) S Aoyama (China) Y Wang | 4 | 3
4 | (Romania) R Olaru (China) Y Xu | 6 | 6
(France) S Foretz (Israel) S Pe'er | 4 | 4
(Chinese Taipei) C-w Chan (Georgia (country)) O Kalashnikova | 7^{7} | 4 | [10]
3 | (Japan) K Date-Krumm (Luxembourg) M Minella | 6^{4} | 6 | [12]
(Belgium) A-S Mestach (Netherlands) D Schuurs | 6 | 6
(United States) N Melichar (Ukraine) M Zanevska | 4 | 2

Semifinals
1 | (Zimbabwe) C Black (United States) L Raymond | 6 | 3 | [6]
4 | (Romania) R Olaru (China) Y Xu | 4 | 6 | [10]
3 | (Japan) K Date-Krumm (Luxembourg) M Minella | 5 | 6 | [8]
(Belgium) A-S Mestach (Netherlands) D Schuurs | 7 | 2 | [10]

Final
4 | (Romania) R Olaru (China) Y Xu | 6 | 6
(Belgium) A-S Mestach (Netherlands) D Schuurs | 3 | 4
