= 2015 Aegon Ilkley Trophy – Women's singles =

Women's singles
- 2015 Aegon Ilkley Trophy

Final
- Champion: (Germany) Anna-Lena Friedsam
- Runner-up: (Poland) Magda Linette
- Score: 5–7, 6–3, 6–1

Events
Singles	men	women
Doubles	men	women
← 2014 ·	Aegon Ilkley Trophy	· 2016 →

This was the first edition of the tournament in the 2015 ITF Women's Circuit.

Anna-Lena Friedsam won the inaugural title, defeating Magda Linette in the final, 5–7, 6–3, 6–1.

== Seeds ==
1. (Germany) Annika Beck (quarterfinals)
2. (Czech Republic) Denisa Allertová (semifinals, retired)
3. (Russia) Vitalia Diatchenko (first round, retired)
4. (Germany) Anna-Lena Friedsam (champion)
5. (Poland) Magda Linette (final)
6. (Belgium) An-Sophie Mestach (first round)
7. (China) Wang Qiang (quarterfinals)
8. (Israel) Shahar Pe'er (second round)

== Main draw ==
=== Key ===
- Q = Qualifier
- WC = Wild card
- LL = Lucky loser
- Alt = Alternate
- ITF = ITF entry
- PR = Protected ranking
- SR = Special ranking
- SE = Special exempt
- JE = Junior exempt
- JR = Junior Accelerator Programme entrant
- CO = College Accelerator Programme entrant
- NG = Next Gen Accelerator Program entrant
- w/o = Walkover
- r = Retired
- d = Defaulted

=== Finals ===
Semifinals
5	(Poland) Magda Linette	6	2	7
Q	(Estonia) Anett Kontaveit	4	6	5
4	(Germany) Anna-Lena Friedsam	4
2	(Czech Republic) Denisa Allertová	5^{r}

Final
5	(Poland) Magda Linette	7	3	1
4	(Germany) Anna-Lena Friedsam	5	6	6

=== Top half ===
First round
1	(Germany) A Beck	6	6^{4}	7
(Israel) J Glushko	0	7^{7}	5
WC	(United Kingdom) K Dunne	1	3
Q	(France) S Foretz	6	6
(Japan) E Hozumi	2	3
(Thailand) L Kumkhum	6	6
WC	(United Kingdom) G Taylor	6	2	2
5	(Poland) M Linette	1	6	6
3	(Russia) V Diatchenko	0^{r}
(Latvia) J Ostapenko	5
Q	(Estonia) A Kontaveit	6^{8}	6	6
(China) L Zhu	7^{10}	1	0
Q	(Paraguay) V Cepede Royg	4	6^{4}
(China) Y Wang	6	7^{7}
(Belarus) O Govortsova	2	5
8	(Israel) S Pe'er	6	7

Second round
1	(Germany) A Beck	6	7^{7}
Q	(France) S Foretz	4	6^{3}
(Thailand) L Kumkhum	3	2
5	(Poland) M Linette	6	6
(Latvia) J Ostapenko	1	2
Q	(Estonia) A Kontaveit	6	6
(China) Y Wang	6	6
8	(Israel) S Pe'er	3	1

Quarterfinals
1	(Germany) A Beck	6	6^{5}	3
5	(Poland) M Linette	0	7^{7}	6
Q	(Estonia) A Kontaveit	6	6
(China) Y Wang	3	2

Semifinals
5	(Poland) M Linette	6	2	7
Q	(Estonia) A Kontaveit	4	6	5

=== Bottom half ===
First round
7	(China) Q Wang	6	5	6
WC	(United Kingdom) JA Burrage	2	7	2
WC	(United Kingdom) T Moore	3	4
(Japan) M Eguchi	6	6
(Poland) P Kania	5	6	6
(Ukraine) Y Beygelzimer	7	3	3
(Belarus) A Sasnovich	3	4
4	(Germany) A-L Friedsam	6	6
6	(Belgium) A-S Mestach	4	5
Q	(Austria) T Paszek	6	7
(China) S Zhang	0	1
(United States) S Vickery	6	6
(France) O Dodin	6	4	2
(Japan) K Date-Krumm	4	6	6
(Japan) N Hibino	2	3
2	(Czech Republic) D Allertová	6	6

Second round
7	(China) Q Wang	7^{7}	6^{5}	6
(Japan) M Eguchi	6^{5}	7^{7}	1
(Poland) P Kania	5	7^{7}	4
4	(Germany) A-L Friedsam	7	6^{5}	6
Q	(Austria) T Paszek	6	6
(United States) S Vickery	0	2
(Japan) K Date-Krumm	2	2
2	(Czech Republic) D Allertová	6	6

Quarterfinals
7	(China) Q Wang	5	4
4	(Germany) A-L Friedsam	7	6
Q	(Austria) T Paszek	5	2
2	(Czech Republic) D Allertová	7	6

Semifinals
4	(Germany) A-L Friedsam	4
2	(Czech Republic) D Allertová	5^{r}
