= 2015 Aegon Ilkley Trophy =

- Date: 15–21 June
- Edition: 1st
- Category: ATP Challenger Tour; ITF Women's Circuit
- Prize money: €42,500 (ATP) $50,000+H (ITF)
- Surface: Grass
- Location: Ilkley, United Kingdom

Champions

Men's singles
- (United States) Denis Kudla

Women's singles
- (Germany) Anna-Lena Friedsam

Men's doubles
- (New Zealand) Marcus Daniell / (Brazil) Marcelo Demoliner

Women's doubles
- (Romania) Raluca Olaru / (China) Xu Yifan
Aegon Ilkley Trophy	· 2016 →

The 2015 Aegon Ilkley Trophy was a professional tennis tournament played on outdoor grass courts. It was the first edition of the tournament and part of the 2015 ATP Challenger Tour and 2015 ITF Women's Circuit, offering a total of €42,500 (ATP) and $50,000+H (ITF) in prize money. It took place in Ilkley, United Kingdom, on 15–21 June 2015.

== Men's singles main draw entrants ==
=== Seeds ===
Country	Player	Rank^{1}	Seed
TUN	Malek Jaziri	80	1
ISR	Dudi Sela	85	2
SLO	Blaž Rola	96	3
RUS	Andrey Kuznetsov	99	4
BEL	Kimmer Coppejans	103	5
ESP	Adrián Menéndez-Maceiras	111	6
CRO	Ivan Dodig	115	7
AUS	John Millman	118	8

- ^{1} Rankings as of 8 June 2015

=== Other entrants ===
The following players received wildcards into the singles main draw:

- (United Kingdom) Luke Bambridge
- (United Kingdom) Joshua Milton
- (United Kingdom) Cameron Norrie
- (United Kingdom) Marcus Willis

The following players received entry as a special exempt into the singles main draw:

- (Australia) Matthew Ebden

The following players used protected entry to gain entry into the singles main draw:

- (Croatia) Ante Pavić

The following players received entry as an alternate into the singles main draw:

- (Japan) Yoshihito Nishioka

The following players received entry from the qualifying draw:

- (Bosnia and Herzegovina) Mirza Bašić
- (Australia) Alex Bolt
- (Australia) Luke Saville
- (Slovenia) Grega Žemlja

== Women's singles main draw entrants ==
=== Seeds ===
Country	Player	Rank^{1}	Seed
GER	Annika Beck	69	1
CZE	Denisa Allertová	77	2
RUS	Vitalia Diatchenko	86	3
GER	Anna-Lena Friedsam	97	4
POL	Magda Linette	102	5
BEL	An-Sophie Mestach	108	6
CHN	Wang Qiang	109	7
ISR	Shahar Pe'er	113	8

- ^{1} Rankings as of 8 June 2015

=== Other entrants ===
The following players received wildcards into the singles main draw:

- (United Kingdom) Jodie Anna Burrage
- (United Kingdom) Katy Dunne
- (United Kingdom) Tara Moore
- (United Kingdom) Gabriella Taylor

The following players received entry from the qualifying draw:

- (Paraguay) Verónica Cepede Royg
- (France) Stéphanie Foretz
- (Estonia) Anett Kontaveit
- (Austria) Tamira Paszek

== Champions ==
=== Men's singles ===
- (United States) Denis Kudla def. (Australia) Matthew Ebden, 6–3, 6–4

=== Women's singles ===
- (Germany) Anna-Lena Friedsam def. (Poland) Magda Linette, 5–7, 6–3, 6–1

=== Men's doubles ===
- (New Zealand) Marcus Daniell / (Brazil) Marcelo Demoliner def. (United Kingdom) Ken Skupski / (United Kingdom) Neal Skupski, 7–6^{(7–3)}, 6–4

=== Women's doubles ===
- (Romania) Raluca Olaru / (China) Xu Yifan def. (Belgium) An-Sophie Mestach / (Netherlands) Demi Schuurs, 6–3, 6–4
