= 2015 ITF Men's Circuit (January–March) =

This article includes the 2015 ITF Men's Circuit tournaments which occurred between January and March 2015.

== Point distribution ==
Tournament Category	W	F	SF	QF	R16	R32
Futures 15,000+H	35	20	10	4	1	0
Futures 15,000	27	15	8	3	1	0
Futures 10,000+H	27	15	8	3	1	0
Futures 10,000	18	10	6	2	1	0

== Key ==
$15,000 tournaments
$10,000 tournaments

== Month ==
=== January ===
Week of	Tournament	Winner	Runners-up	Semifinalists	Quarterfinalists
January 5	United States F2 Futures; Los Angeles, United States; Hard $15,000; Singles and Doubles Draw	(United States) Mitchell Krueger; 6–1, 6–2	(United States) Jason Jung	(United States) Taylor Harry Fritz (Bulgaria) Dimitar Kutrovsky	(United States) Stefan Kozlov (United Kingdom) Alexander Ward (Denmark) Frederik Nielsen (United States) Nathan Ponwith
January 5	United States F2 Futures; Los Angeles, United States; Hard $15,000; Singles and Doubles Draw	(Bulgaria) Dimitar Kutrovsky (United States) Dennis Novikov; 4–6, 6–1, [10–4]	(Republic of Ireland) James Cluskey (Denmark) Frederik Nielsen	(United States) Taylor Harry Fritz (Bulgaria) Dimitar Kutrovsky	(United States) Stefan Kozlov (United Kingdom) Alexander Ward (Denmark) Frederik Nielsen (United States) Nathan Ponwith
January 5	Germany F1 Futures; Schwieberdingen, Germany; Carpet (indoor) $10,000; Singles and Doubles Draw	(France) Mick Lescure; 2–6, 6–1, 6–2	(Belarus) Ilya Ivashka	(Belarus) Uladzimir Ignatik (France) Tom Jomby	(Germany) Johannes Härteis (United States) Peter Kobelt (Germany) Yannick Maden (Germany) Lukas Rüpke
January 5	Germany F1 Futures; Schwieberdingen, Germany; Carpet (indoor) $10,000; Singles and Doubles Draw	(Germany) Fabian Fallert (Germany) Florian Fallert; 6–4, 6–3	(Romania) Victor Vlad Cornea (Switzerland) Henri Laaksonen	(Belarus) Uladzimir Ignatik (France) Tom Jomby	(Germany) Johannes Härteis (United States) Peter Kobelt (Germany) Yannick Maden (Germany) Lukas Rüpke
January 5	Turkey F1 Futures; Antalya, Turkey; Hard $10,000; Singles and Doubles Draw	(Japan) Shuichi Sekiguchi; 6–7^{(7–9)}, 6–4, 6–3	(France) Hugo Nys	(Russia) Alexey Vatutin (Italy) Riccardo Bellotti	(Turkey) Cem İlkel (Brazil) José Pereira (Russia) Timur Kiuamov (Austria) Dennis Novak
January 5	Turkey F1 Futures; Antalya, Turkey; Hard $10,000; Singles and Doubles Draw	(Japan) Arata Onozawa (Japan) Shuichi Sekiguchi; 6–3, 1–6, [10–5]	(Turkey) Cem İlkel (Turkey) Efe Yurtacan	(Russia) Alexey Vatutin (Italy) Riccardo Bellotti	(Turkey) Cem İlkel (Brazil) José Pereira (Russia) Timur Kiuamov (Austria) Dennis Novak
January 5	United States F1 Futures; Plantation, United States; Clay $10,000; Singles and Doubles Draw	(Sweden) Christian Lindell; 7–5, 6–0	(Germany) Julian Lenz	(United States) Deiton Baughman (Ecuador) Gonzalo Escobar	(Sweden) Markus Eriksson (United States) Jeff Dadamo (China) Wang Chuhan (Colombia) Nicolás Barrientos
January 5	United States F1 Futures; Plantation, United States; Clay $10,000; Singles and Doubles Draw	(Monaco) Romain Arneodo (Monaco) Benjamin Balleret; 6–7^{(3–7)}, 6–3, [10–7]	(Sweden) Markus Eriksson (Sweden) Patrik Rosenholm	(United States) Deiton Baughman (Ecuador) Gonzalo Escobar	(Sweden) Markus Eriksson (United States) Jeff Dadamo (China) Wang Chuhan (Colombia) Nicolás Barrientos
January 12	United States F4 Futures; Long Beach, United States; Outdoor $15,000; Singles and Doubles Draw	(Zimbabwe) Takanyi Garanganga; 6–7^{(5–7)}, 6–3, 6–4	(Denmark) Frederik Nielsen	(United States) Alexander Sarkissian (United States) Jason Jung	(United States) Stefan Kozlov (United States) Mico Santiago (United States) Mitchell Krueger (Germany) Yannick Hanfmann
January 12	United States F4 Futures; Long Beach, United States; Outdoor $15,000; Singles and Doubles Draw	(United States) Nicolas Meister (United States) Eric Quigley; 6–3, 6–2	(Bulgaria) Dimitar Kutrovsky (United States) Dennis Novikov	(United States) Alexander Sarkissian (United States) Jason Jung	(United States) Stefan Kozlov (United States) Mico Santiago (United States) Mitchell Krueger (Germany) Yannick Hanfmann
January 12	Egypt F1 Futures; Cairo, Egypt; Clay $10,000; Singles and Doubles Draw	(Czech Republic) Dušan Lojda; 6–4, 0–6, 7–5	(Slovakia) Adrian Partl	(Spain) Marcos Giraldi Requena (Italy) Walter Trusendi	(Belgium) Jeroen Vanneste (Argentina) Matías Zukas (Czech Republic) Michal Konečný (Poland) Paweł Ciaś
January 12	Egypt F1 Futures; Cairo, Egypt; Clay $10,000; Singles and Doubles Draw	(Italy) Walter Trusendi (Italy) Matteo Volante; 6–1, 6–4	(Poland) Paweł Ciaś (Poland) Maciej Nowak	(Spain) Marcos Giraldi Requena (Italy) Walter Trusendi	(Belgium) Jeroen Vanneste (Argentina) Matías Zukas (Czech Republic) Michal Konečný (Poland) Paweł Ciaś
January 12	France F1 Futures; Bagnoles-de-l'Orne, France; Clay (indoor) $10,000+H; Singles and Doubles Draw	(France) Yannick Thivant; 6–1, 6–0	(France) Gleb Sakharov	(Belgium) Alexandre Folie (France) Calvin Hemery	(France) Joffrey de Schepper (France) Alexandre Sidorenko (Spain) Jaume Munar (France) Medy Chettar
January 12	France F1 Futures; Bagnoles-de-l'Orne, France; Clay (indoor) $10,000+H; Singles and Doubles Draw	(France) Dorian Descloix (France) Gleb Sakharov; 6–4, 6–2	(France) Quentin Halys (France) Alexandre Sidorenko	(Belgium) Alexandre Folie (France) Calvin Hemery	(France) Joffrey de Schepper (France) Alexandre Sidorenko (Spain) Jaume Munar (France) Medy Chettar
January 12	Germany F2 Futures; Stuttgart, Germany; Hard (indoor) $10,000; Singles and Doubles Draw	(Germany) Maximilian Marterer; 6–4, 4–6, 7–5	(Belarus) Uladzimir Ignatik	(Croatia) Filip Veger (France) Sébastien Boltz	(Germany) Richard Becker (Ukraine) Vadym Ursu (France) Mick Lescure (Switzerland) Henri Laaksonen
January 12	Germany F2 Futures; Stuttgart, Germany; Hard (indoor) $10,000; Singles and Doubles Draw	(France) Tom Jomby (France) Mick Lescure; 7–6^{(7–4)}, 6–4	(Germany) Kevin Krawietz (Germany) Maximilian Marterer	(Croatia) Filip Veger (France) Sébastien Boltz	(Germany) Richard Becker (Ukraine) Vadym Ursu (France) Mick Lescure (Switzerland) Henri Laaksonen
January 12	Iran F1 Futures; Kish, Iran; Clay $10,000; Singles and Doubles Draw	(Spain) Carlos Boluda Purkiss; 6–4, 6–0	(Romania) Vasile Antonescu	(France) Martin Vaïsse (Croatia) Franjo Raspudić	(Romania) Andrei Stefan Apostol (France) Jérôme Inzerillo (Ukraine) Vadim Alekseenko (North Macedonia) Tomislav Jotovski
January 12	Iran F1 Futures; Kish, Iran; Clay $10,000; Singles and Doubles Draw	(Romania) Vasile Antonescu (Romania) Luca George Tatomir; 6–4, 3–6, [10–4]	(Spain) Carlos Boluda Purkiss (Spain) Miguel Semmler	(France) Martin Vaïsse (Croatia) Franjo Raspudić	(Romania) Andrei Stefan Apostol (France) Jérôme Inzerillo (Ukraine) Vadim Alekseenko (North Macedonia) Tomislav Jotovski
January 12	Tunisia F1 Futures; Port El Kantaoui, Tunisia; Hard $10,000; Singles and Doubles Draw	(Spain) Mario Vilella Martínez; 6–4, 6–2	(France) Yannick Jankovits	(France) Rémi Boutillier (Poland) Andriej Kapaś	(Italy) Stefano Napolitano (Italy) Salvatore Caruso (France) Thibault Venturino (Poland) Marcin Gawron
January 12	Tunisia F1 Futures; Port El Kantaoui, Tunisia; Hard $10,000; Singles and Doubles Draw	(France) Rémi Boutillier (France) Élie Rousset; 7–5, 6–4	(France) Hugo Grenier (France) Yannick Jankovits	(France) Rémi Boutillier (Poland) Andriej Kapaś	(Italy) Stefano Napolitano (Italy) Salvatore Caruso (France) Thibault Venturino (Poland) Marcin Gawron
January 12	Turkey F2 Futures; Antalya, Turkey; Hard $10,000; Singles and Doubles Draw	(Brazil) José Pereira; 6–4, 6–3	(Russia) Alexey Vatutin	(Brazil) Wilson Leite (Ukraine) Artem Smirnov	(Turkey) Cem İlkel (Italy) Riccardo Bellotti (South Korea) Lee Duck-hee (South Korea) Kim Cheong-eui
January 12	Turkey F2 Futures; Antalya, Turkey; Hard $10,000; Singles and Doubles Draw	(Ukraine) Artem Smirnov (Ukraine) Volodymyr Uzhylovskyi; 6–3, 6–0	(South Korea) Kim Cheong-eui (China) Li Zhe	(Brazil) Wilson Leite (Ukraine) Artem Smirnov	(Turkey) Cem İlkel (Italy) Riccardo Bellotti (South Korea) Lee Duck-hee (South Korea) Kim Cheong-eui
January 12	United States F3 Futures; Sunrise, United States; Clay $10,000; Singles and Doubles Draw	(United States) Deiton Baughman; 3–6, 7–6^{(7–5)}, 6–4	(Monaco) Benjamin Balleret	(France) Samuel Bensoussan (United States) Frances Tiafoe	(South Korea) Kim Young-seok (Mexico) Daniel Garza (United States) Connor Smith (Sweden) Markus Eriksson
January 12	United States F3 Futures; Sunrise, United States; Clay $10,000; Singles and Doubles Draw	(Monaco) Romain Arneodo (Monaco) Benjamin Balleret; 6–2, 7–5	(Ecuador) Emilio Gómez (United States) Connor Smith	(France) Samuel Bensoussan (United States) Frances Tiafoe	(South Korea) Kim Young-seok (Mexico) Daniel Garza (United States) Connor Smith (Sweden) Markus Eriksson
January 19	Germany F3 Futures; Kaarst, Germany; Carpet (indoor) $15,000	(Germany) Maximilian Marterer; 7–6^{(7–5)}, 6–4	(Czech Republic) Marek Michalička	(Germany) Daniel Brands (Croatia) Filip Veger	(Belarus) Uladzimir Ignatik (Germany) Yannick Maden (Switzerland) Henri Laaksonen (Germany) Florian Fallert
January 19	Germany F3 Futures; Kaarst, Germany; Carpet (indoor) $15,000	(Netherlands) Sander Arends (Poland) Adam Majchrowicz; 6–3, 6–4	(Netherlands) Wesley Koolhof (Netherlands) Matwé Middelkoop	(Germany) Daniel Brands (Croatia) Filip Veger	(Belarus) Uladzimir Ignatik (Germany) Yannick Maden (Switzerland) Henri Laaksonen (Germany) Florian Fallert
January 19	Kazakhstan F1 Futures; Astana, Kazakhstan; Hard (indoor) $15,000	(Russia) Mikhail Elgin; 6–4, 6–4	(Uzbekistan) Sanjar Fayziev	(Moldova) Maxim Dubarenco (Russia) Evgeny Elistratov	(Kazakhstan) Dmitry Popko (Russia) Karen Khachanov (Belarus) Ilya Ivashka (Russia) Anton Zaitcev
January 19	Kazakhstan F1 Futures; Astana, Kazakhstan; Hard (indoor) $15,000	(Belarus) Yaraslav Shyla (Belarus) Andrei Vasilevski; 3–6, 7–6^{(7–2)}, [10–4]	(Russia) Mikhail Elgin (Russia) Karen Khachanov	(Moldova) Maxim Dubarenco (Russia) Evgeny Elistratov	(Kazakhstan) Dmitry Popko (Russia) Karen Khachanov (Belarus) Ilya Ivashka (Russia) Anton Zaitcev
January 19	Egypt F2 Futures; Cairo, Egypt; Clay $10,000	(Egypt) Mohamed Safwat; 7–5, 6–3	(Poland) Kamil Majchrzak	(South Korea) Na Jung-woong (Belgium) Jeroen Vanneste	(Spain) Javier Martí (Slovakia) Adrian Partl (Hungary) André Biró (Italy) Gianluca Naso
January 19	Egypt F2 Futures; Cairo, Egypt; Clay $10,000	(France) Maxime Janvier (Poland) Kamil Majchrzak; 6–2, 6–2	(South Korea) Na Jung-woong (South Korea) Yun Jae-won	(South Korea) Na Jung-woong (Belgium) Jeroen Vanneste	(Spain) Javier Martí (Slovakia) Adrian Partl (Hungary) André Biró (Italy) Gianluca Naso
January 19	France F2 Futures; Bressuire, France; Hard (indoor) $10,000+H	(France) Benoît Paire; 6–3, 0–6, 6–2	(France) Maxime Teixeira	(France) Hugo Nys (France) Alexandre Sidorenko	(France) Laurent Rochette (France) Grégoire Jacq (France) Vincent Stouff (France) Grégoire Barrère
January 19	France F2 Futures; Bressuire, France; Hard (indoor) $10,000+H	(France) Fabrice Martin (India) Purav Raja; 6–3, 6–2	(United States) Kevin King (United Kingdom) David Rice	(France) Hugo Nys (France) Alexandre Sidorenko	(France) Laurent Rochette (France) Grégoire Jacq (France) Vincent Stouff (France) Grégoire Barrère
January 19	Great Britain F1 Futures; Sheffield, Great Britain; Hard (indoor) $10,000	(United Kingdom) Daniel Smethurst; 6–4, 6–4	(United Kingdom) Daniel Cox	(United Kingdom) Tom Farquharson (United Kingdom) Marcus Willis	(United Kingdom) Joshua Milton (Germany) Pirmin Hänle (France) Nicolas Rosenzweig (United Kingdom) James Marsalek
January 19	Great Britain F1 Futures; Sheffield, Great Britain; Hard (indoor) $10,000	(Sweden) Isak Arvidsson (Finland) Micke Kontinen; 6–4, 5–7, [10–6]	(United Kingdom) Luke Bambridge (United Kingdom) Andrew Bettles	(United Kingdom) Tom Farquharson (United Kingdom) Marcus Willis	(United Kingdom) Joshua Milton (Germany) Pirmin Hänle (France) Nicolas Rosenzweig (United Kingdom) James Marsalek
January 19	Iran F2 Futures; Kish, Iran; Clay $10,000	(Austria) Michael Linzer; 4–6, 6–4, 7–6^{(7–5)}	(France) Alexis Musialek	(Spain) Carlos Boluda-Purkiss (Croatia) Franjo Raspudić	(Romania) Vasile Antonescu (Italy) Marco Bortolotti (Romania) Luca George Tatomir (Ukraine) Vadim Alekseenko
January 19	Iran F2 Futures; Kish, Iran; Clay $10,000	(Italy) Marco Bortolotti (Poland) Arkadiusz Kocyła; 5–7, 6–3 [11–9]	(Spain) Carlos Boluda-Purkiss (Spain) Miguel Semmler	(Spain) Carlos Boluda-Purkiss (Croatia) Franjo Raspudić	(Romania) Vasile Antonescu (Italy) Marco Bortolotti (Romania) Luca George Tatomir (Ukraine) Vadim Alekseenko
January 19	Tunisia F2 Futures; Port El Kantaoui, Tunisia; Hard $10,000	(Serbia) Danilo Petrović; 6–4, 6–4	(Italy) Salvatore Caruso	(Italy) Stefano Napolitano (France) Élie Rousset	(France) Yannick Jankovits (Serbia) Petar Čonkić (Poland) Andriej Kapaś (Lithuania) Lukas Mugevičius
January 19	Tunisia F2 Futures; Port El Kantaoui, Tunisia; Hard $10,000	(Italy) Claudio Grassi (Italy) Matteo Volante; 6–7^{(6–8)}, 6–3, [10–8]	(Poland) Marcin Gawron (Poland) Andriej Kapaś	(Italy) Stefano Napolitano (France) Élie Rousset	(France) Yannick Jankovits (Serbia) Petar Čonkić (Poland) Andriej Kapaś (Lithuania) Lukas Mugevičius
January 19	Turkey F3 Futures; Antalya, Turkey; Hard $10,000	(Netherlands) Miliaan Niesten; 6–1, 2–6, 6–3	(Brazil) José Pereira	(Turkey) Cem İlkel (Italy) Riccardo Bellotti	(South Africa) Ruan Roelofse (Slovenia) Mike Urbanija (France) Gleb Sakharov (China) Zhe Li
January 19	Turkey F3 Futures; Antalya, Turkey; Hard $10,000	(Austria) Lucas Miedler (Austria) Maximilian Neuchrist; 6–4, 6–4	(China) Li Zhe (South Africa) Ruan Roelofse	(Turkey) Cem İlkel (Italy) Riccardo Bellotti	(South Africa) Ruan Roelofse (Slovenia) Mike Urbanija (France) Gleb Sakharov (China) Zhe Li
January 19	United States F5 Futures; Weston, United States; Clay $10,000	(Monaco) Benjamin Balleret; 7–5, 6–4	(United States) Frances Tiafoe	(Sweden) Markus Eriksson (Barbados) Darian King	(United States) Tommy Paul (Monaco) Romain Arneodo (Spain) Carlos Gómez-Herrera (United States) Greg Ouellette
January 19	United States F5 Futures; Weston, United States; Clay $10,000	(Monaco) Romain Arneodo (Monaco) Benjamin Balleret; 7–5, 7–6^{(7–2)}	(El Salvador) Marcelo Arévalo (Venezuela) Luis David Martínez	(Sweden) Markus Eriksson (Barbados) Darian King	(United States) Tommy Paul (Monaco) Romain Arneodo (Spain) Carlos Gómez-Herrera (United States) Greg Ouellette
January 26	Egypt F3 Futures; Cairo, Egypt; Clay $15,000	(Serbia) Laslo Djere; 6–3, 7–5	(Poland) Kamil Majchrzak	(Austria) Dennis Novak (Czech Republic) Dušan Lojda	(Egypt) Mohamed Safwat (Egypt) Karim-Mohamed Maamoun (Slovakia) Ivo Klec (Croatia) Nino Serdarušić
January 26	Egypt F3 Futures; Cairo, Egypt; Clay $15,000	(Egypt) Karim-Mohamed Maamoun (Syria) Issam Haitham Taweel; 6–2, 6–3	(Serbia) Ilija Vučić (France) Tak Khunn Wang	(Austria) Dennis Novak (Czech Republic) Dušan Lojda	(Egypt) Mohamed Safwat (Egypt) Karim-Mohamed Maamoun (Slovakia) Ivo Klec (Croatia) Nino Serdarušić
January 26	Germany F4 Futures; Nußloch, Germany; Carpet (indoor) $15,000	(Belgium) Ruben Bemelmans; 6–3, 6–7^{(2–7)}, 7–6^{(7–5)}	(Germany) Maximilian Marterer	(Germany) Daniel Masur (Germany) Florian Fallert	(Germany) Johannes Härteis (Czech Republic) Marek Michalička (Switzerland) Henri Laaksonen (Germany) Peter Torebko
January 26	Germany F4 Futures; Nußloch, Germany; Carpet (indoor) $15,000	(Netherlands) Sander Arends (Poland) Adam Majchrowicz; 6–4, 3–6, [10–5]	(Germany) Denis Kapric (Germany) Lukas Rüpke	(Germany) Daniel Masur (Germany) Florian Fallert	(Germany) Johannes Härteis (Czech Republic) Marek Michalička (Switzerland) Henri Laaksonen (Germany) Peter Torebko
January 26	Kazakhstan F2 Futures; Astana, Kazakhstan; Hard (indoor) $15,000	(Russia) Mikhail Elgin; 3–6, 6–4, 7–6^{(7–5)}	(Belarus) Dzmitry Zhyrmont	(Uzbekistan) Sanjar Fayziev (Russia) Denis Matsukevich	(Russia) Evgenii Tiurnev (Belarus) Ilya Ivashka (Moldova) Maxim Dubarenco (Belarus) Yaraslav Shyla
January 26	Kazakhstan F2 Futures; Astana, Kazakhstan; Hard (indoor) $15,000	(Belarus) Yaraslav Shyla (Belarus) Andrei Vasilevski; 7–6^{(7–5)}, 7–6^{(7–5)}	(Russia) Evgenii Tiurnev (Russia) Anton Zaitcev	(Uzbekistan) Sanjar Fayziev (Russia) Denis Matsukevich	(Russia) Evgenii Tiurnev (Belarus) Ilya Ivashka (Moldova) Maxim Dubarenco (Belarus) Yaraslav Shyla
January 26	France F3 Futures; Feucherolles, France; Hard (Indoor) $10,000+H	(Canada) Filip Peliwo; 6–2, 6–4	(Netherlands) Antal van der Duim	(France) David Guez (France) Sébastien Boltz	(France) Grégoire Jacq (Lithuania) Laurynas Grigelis (France) Tristan Lamasine (France) Grégoire Barrère
January 26	France F3 Futures; Feucherolles, France; Hard (Indoor) $10,000+H	(Netherlands) Wesley Koolhof (Netherlands) Matwé Middelkoop; 6–3, 6–4	(Belgium) Maxime Authom (Belgium) Yannick Mertens	(France) David Guez (France) Sébastien Boltz	(France) Grégoire Jacq (Lithuania) Laurynas Grigelis (France) Tristan Lamasine (France) Grégoire Barrère
January 26	Great Britain F2 Futures; Sunderland, Great Britain; Hard (indoor) $10,000	(United Kingdom) Daniel Cox; 7–6^{(10–8)}, 6–3	(United Kingdom) Alexander Ward	(France) Matthieu Roy (United Kingdom) James Marsalek	(France) Quentin Halys (United States) Michael Grant (United Kingdom) Joshua Milton (United Kingdom) Daniel Smethurst
January 26	Great Britain F2 Futures; Sunderland, Great Britain; Hard (indoor) $10,000	(United Kingdom) Lewis Burton (United Kingdom) Marcus Willis; 6–3, 6–2	(Sweden) Isak Arvidsson (Finland) Micke Kontinen	(France) Matthieu Roy (United Kingdom) James Marsalek	(France) Quentin Halys (United States) Michael Grant (United Kingdom) Joshua Milton (United Kingdom) Daniel Smethurst
January 26	Iran F3 Futures; Kish, Iran; Clay $10,000	(France) Alexis Musialek; 7–5, 6–0	(Romania) Vasile Antonescu	(Ukraine) Vadim Alekseenko (Spain) Carlos Boluda-Purkiss	(France) Martin Vaïsse (Croatia) Mateo Faber (France) Jérôme Inzerillo (Italy) Marco Bortolotti
January 26	Iran F3 Futures; Kish, Iran; Clay $10,000	(Italy) Marco Bortolotti (Poland) Arkadiusz Kocyła; 7–6^{(7–5)}, 6–3	(Romania) Andrei Stefan Apostol (Romania) Alexandru Jecan	(Ukraine) Vadim Alekseenko (Spain) Carlos Boluda-Purkiss	(France) Martin Vaïsse (Croatia) Mateo Faber (France) Jérôme Inzerillo (Italy) Marco Bortolotti
January 26	Spain F1 Futures; Castelldefels, Spain; Clay $10,000	(Poland) Grzegorz Panfil; 6–2, 4–6, 6–4	(France) Maxime Hamou	(Spain) Rubén Ramírez Hidalgo (Spain) Gerard Granollers	(Morocco) Lamine Ouahab (Spain) Ricardo Ojeda Lara (Italy) Lorenzo Giustino (Spain) Pol Toledo Bagué
January 26	Spain F1 Futures; Castelldefels, Spain; Clay $10,000	(Spain) Sergio Martos Gornés (Spain) Pol Toledo Bagué; 6–2, 6–3	(Australia) Jake Eames (Portugal) Gonçalo Oliveira	(Spain) Rubén Ramírez Hidalgo (Spain) Gerard Granollers	(Morocco) Lamine Ouahab (Spain) Ricardo Ojeda Lara (Italy) Lorenzo Giustino (Spain) Pol Toledo Bagué
January 26	Tunisia F3 Futures; Port El Kantaoui, Tunisia; Hard $10,000	(Spain) Mario Vilella Martínez; 6–7^{(4–7)}, 6–4, 7–6^{(7–2)}	(Spain) Jaime Pulgar-García	(Italy) Salvatore Caruso (Luxembourg) Ugo Nastasi	(Portugal) Romain Barbosa (Italy) Antonio Massara (Italy) Pietro Rondoni (Japan) Yusuke Watanuki
January 26	Tunisia F3 Futures; Port El Kantaoui, Tunisia; Hard $10,000	(Italy) Riccardo Ghedin (Italy) Claudio Grassi; 4–6, 7–6^{(7–2)}, [10–4]	(Bulgaria) Alexandar Lazov (Russia) Daniil Medvedev	(Italy) Salvatore Caruso (Luxembourg) Ugo Nastasi	(Portugal) Romain Barbosa (Italy) Antonio Massara (Italy) Pietro Rondoni (Japan) Yusuke Watanuki
January 26	Turkey F4 Futures; Antalya, Turkey; Hard $10,000	(Brazil) José Pereira; 7–5, 4–6, 6–2	(Italy) Riccardo Bellotti	(Venezuela) Ricardo Rodríguez (France) Théo Fournerie	(Russia) Aleksandr Vasilenko (France) Gleb Sakharov (Slovenia) Mike Urbanija (Austria) Maximilian Neuchrist
January 26	Turkey F4 Futures; Antalya, Turkey; Hard $10,000	(China) Zhe Li (South Africa) Ruan Roelofse; 6–3, 4–6, [10–2]	(Germany) Jan Choinski (Germany) Kevin Krawietz	(Venezuela) Ricardo Rodríguez (France) Théo Fournerie	(Russia) Aleksandr Vasilenko (France) Gleb Sakharov (Slovenia) Mike Urbanija (Austria) Maximilian Neuchrist
January 26	United States F6 Futures; Palm Coast, United States; Clay $10,000	(Monaco) Benjamin Balleret; 6–4, 6–4	(Argentina) Patricio Heras	(United States) Tommy Paul (United States) Connor Smith	(El Salvador) Marcelo Arévalo (Italy) Gianluigi Quinzi (United States) Frances Tiafoe (United States) Reilly Opelka
January 26	United States F6 Futures; Palm Coast, United States; Clay $10,000	(Monaco) Romain Arneodo (Monaco) Benjamin Balleret; 7–5, 7–6^{(7–3)}	(Sweden) Markus Eriksson (Sweden) Patrik Rosenholm	(United States) Tommy Paul (United States) Connor Smith	(El Salvador) Marcelo Arévalo (Italy) Gianluigi Quinzi (United States) Frances Tiafoe (United States) Reilly Opelka

=== February ===
Week of	Tournament	Winner	Runners-up	Semifinalists	Quarterfinalists
February 2	Egypt F4 Futures; Sharm El Sheikh, Egypt; Hard $10,000	(Austria) Dennis Novak; 2–6, 6–3, 7–6^{(8–6)}	(Czech Republic) Jaroslav Pospíšil	(Italy) Stefano Travaglia (Chinese Taipei) Chen Ti	(Egypt) Karim-Mohamed Maamoun (Egypt) Mohamed Safwat (Italy) Walter Trusendi (Australia) Jarryd Chaplin
February 2	Egypt F4 Futures; Sharm El Sheikh, Egypt; Hard $10,000	(Serbia) Ivan Bjelica (Croatia) Matija Pecotić; 6–3, 6–2	(Chinese Taipei) Chen Ti (Italy) Stefano Travaglia	(Italy) Stefano Travaglia (Chinese Taipei) Chen Ti	(Egypt) Karim-Mohamed Maamoun (Egypt) Mohamed Safwat (Italy) Walter Trusendi (Australia) Jarryd Chaplin
February 2	Spain F2 Futures; Peguera, Spain; Clay $10,000	(Italy) Gianluca Naso; 6–4, 6–4	(Argentina) Pedro Cachin	(Austria) Nicolas Reissig (Spain) Pol Toledo Bagué	(Spain) Carlos Taberner (Italy) Lorenzo Giustino (Spain) Juan Lizariturry (France) Jordan Ubiergo
February 2	Spain F2 Futures; Peguera, Spain; Clay $10,000	(Spain) Sergio Martos Gornés (Spain) Pol Toledo Bagué; 6–7^{(5–7)}, 6–3, [10–8]	(Spain) Juan-Samuel Arauzo-Martínez (Germany) Jean-Marc Werner	(Austria) Nicolas Reissig (Spain) Pol Toledo Bagué	(Spain) Carlos Taberner (Italy) Lorenzo Giustino (Spain) Juan Lizariturry (France) Jordan Ubiergo
February 2	Sri Lanka F1 Futures; Colombo, Sri Lanka; Clay $10,000	(Portugal) Rui Machado; 6–3, 6–3	(Czech Republic) Jan Šátral	(Serbia) Miljan Zekić (Germany) Jonas Lütjen	(Spain) José Checa Calvo (India) Sumit Nagal (United States) Andre Dome (Chinese Taipei) Huang Liang-chi
February 2	Sri Lanka F1 Futures; Colombo, Sri Lanka; Clay $10,000	(Germany) Daniel Altmaier (Germany) Tom Schönenberg; 6–7^{(6–8)}, 6–3, [11–9]	(Spain) José Checa Calvo (Portugal) Rui Machado	(Serbia) Miljan Zekić (Germany) Jonas Lütjen	(Spain) José Checa Calvo (India) Sumit Nagal (United States) Andre Dome (Chinese Taipei) Huang Liang-chi
February 2	Tunisia F4 Futures; Port El Kantaoui, Tunisia; Hard $10,000	(Germany) Peter Heller; 7–5, 7–6^{(8–6)}	(Spain) Gerard Granollers	(Belgium) Arthur De Greef (Italy) Gianluca Mager	(Serbia) Marko Tepavac (Portugal) Frederico Ferreira Silva (Spain) Jaime Pulgar-García (Spain) Oriol Roca Batalla
February 2	Tunisia F4 Futures; Port El Kantaoui, Tunisia; Hard $10,000	(Germany) Peter Heller (Austria) Dominic Weidinger; 6–3, 6–3	(Bulgaria) Alexandar Lazov (Russia) Daniil Medvedev	(Belgium) Arthur De Greef (Italy) Gianluca Mager	(Serbia) Marko Tepavac (Portugal) Frederico Ferreira Silva (Spain) Jaime Pulgar-García (Spain) Oriol Roca Batalla
February 2	Turkey F5 Futures; Antalya, Turkey; Hard $10,000	(Italy) Riccardo Bellotti; 7–6^{(7–2)}, 7–5	(Serbia) Nikola Milojević	(Germany) Kevin Krawietz (Venezuela) Ricardo Rodríguez	(China) Bai Yan (Mexico) Lucas Gómez (China) Zhe Li (Italy) Patrick Prader
February 2	Turkey F5 Futures; Antalya, Turkey; Hard $10,000	(Bulgaria) Dimitar Kuzmanov (Venezuela) Ricardo Rodríguez; 2–6, 6–3, [10–8]	(Israel) Dekel Bar (Mexico) Lucas Gómez	(Germany) Kevin Krawietz (Venezuela) Ricardo Rodríguez	(China) Bai Yan (Mexico) Lucas Gómez (China) Zhe Li (Italy) Patrick Prader
February 9	Egypt F5 Futures; Sharm El Sheikh, Egypt; Hard $10,000	(Austria) Dennis Novak; 6–7^{(5–7)}, 6–3, 7–6^{(7–2)}	(Czech Republic) Jaroslav Pospíšil	(Croatia) Matija Pecotić (Serbia) Ivan Bjelica	(Egypt) Karim-Mohamed Maamoun (Turkey) Anıl Yüksel (Turkey) Barış Ergüden (South Korea) Na Jung-woong
February 9	Egypt F5 Futures; Sharm El Sheikh, Egypt; Hard $10,000	(Czech Republic) Dominik Kellovský (Czech Republic) Jaroslav Pospíšil; 6–4, 6–4	(Egypt) Sherif Sabry (Germany) George von Massow	(Croatia) Matija Pecotić (Serbia) Ivan Bjelica	(Egypt) Karim-Mohamed Maamoun (Turkey) Anıl Yüksel (Turkey) Barış Ergüden (South Korea) Na Jung-woong
February 9	Guatemala F1 Futures; Guatemala City, Guatemala; Hard $10,000	(El Salvador) Marcelo Arévalo; 6–3, 6–1	(Guatemala) Christopher Díaz Figueroa	(Peru) Jorge Brian Panta (Costa Rica) Julián Saborío	(Mexico) Luis Patiño (Argentina) Nicolás Alberto Arreche (Mexico) Kevin Jack Carpenter (Colombia) Felipe Mantilla
February 9	Guatemala F1 Futures; Guatemala City, Guatemala; Hard $10,000	(Mexico) Hans Hach Verdugo (Mexico) Manuel Sánchez; 6–3, 6–2	(Mexico) Kevin Jack Carpenter (United States) Collin Johns	(Peru) Jorge Brian Panta (Costa Rica) Julián Saborío	(Mexico) Luis Patiño (Argentina) Nicolás Alberto Arreche (Mexico) Kevin Jack Carpenter (Colombia) Felipe Mantilla
February 9	Spain F3 Futures; Peguera, Spain; Clay $10,000	(France) Maxime Hamou; 6–2, 6–7^{(4–7)}, 7–5	(Spain) Albert Alcaraz Ivorra	(Argentina) Pedro Cachin (Spain) Marc Giner	(Spain) Juan-Samuel Arauzo-Martínez (France) Julien Obry (Austria) Nicolas Reissig (Italy) Lorenzo Giustino
February 9	Spain F3 Futures; Peguera, Spain; Clay $10,000	(Spain) Jaume Munar (Italy) Gianluca Naso; 3–6, 6–4, [10–1]	(Spain) Marc Fornell (Spain) Marco Neubau	(Argentina) Pedro Cachin (Spain) Marc Giner	(Spain) Juan-Samuel Arauzo-Martínez (France) Julien Obry (Austria) Nicolas Reissig (Italy) Lorenzo Giustino
February 9	Sri Lanka F2 Futures; Colombo, Sri Lanka; Clay $10,000	(Portugal) Rui Machado; 6–2, 6–1	(Serbia) Miljan Zekić	(Germany) Jonas Lütjen (India) Mohit Mayur Jayaprakash	(France) Laurent Recouderc (South Korea) Lee Duck-hee (Belgium) Sander Gillé (France) Michael Bois
February 9	Sri Lanka F2 Futures; Colombo, Sri Lanka; Clay $10,000	(Czech Republic) Libor Salaba (Czech Republic) Jan Šátral; 6–2, 4–6, [11–9]	(Belgium) Sander Gillé (Chinese Taipei) Huang Liang-chi	(Germany) Jonas Lütjen (India) Mohit Mayur Jayaprakash	(France) Laurent Recouderc (South Korea) Lee Duck-hee (Belgium) Sander Gillé (France) Michael Bois
February 9	Tunisia F5 Futures; Port El Kantaoui, Tunisia; Hard $10,000	(France) Mathias Bourgue; 2–6, 6–4, 7–6^{(10–8)}	(Belgium) Arthur De Greef	(Spain) Oriol Roca Batalla (Slovakia) Patrik Fabian	(Norway) Viktor Durasovic (Japan) Takashi Saito (Croatia) Matej Sabanov (Bulgaria) Alexandar Lazov
February 9	Tunisia F5 Futures; Port El Kantaoui, Tunisia; Hard $10,000	(Italy) Pietro Licciardi (Canada) Filip Peliwo; 7–6^{(7–4)}, 7–6^{(7–5)}	(Japan) Hiroyasu Ehara (Japan) Takashi Saito	(Spain) Oriol Roca Batalla (Slovakia) Patrik Fabian	(Norway) Viktor Durasovic (Japan) Takashi Saito (Croatia) Matej Sabanov (Bulgaria) Alexandar Lazov
February 9	Turkey F6 Futures; Antalya, Turkey; Hard $10,000	(Netherlands) Miliaan Niesten; 6–2, 6–3	(Bulgaria) Dimitar Kuzmanov	(Belgium) Jonas Merckx (Latvia) Mārtiņš Podžus	(China) Bai Yan (China) Cao Zhaoyi (Germany) Marc Sieber (United States) Adam El Mihdawy
February 9	Turkey F6 Futures; Antalya, Turkey; Hard $10,000	(South Africa) Ruan Roelofse (South Africa) Tucker Vorster; 6–3, 2–6, [10–7]	(France) Gleb Sakharov (Austria) Tristan-Samuel Weissborn	(Belgium) Jonas Merckx (Latvia) Mārtiņš Podžus	(China) Bai Yan (China) Cao Zhaoyi (Germany) Marc Sieber (United States) Adam El Mihdawy
February 9	United States F7 Futures; Sunrise, United States; Clay $10,000	(Italy) Gianluigi Quinzi; 6–4, 6–4	(Argentina) Federico Coria	(Barbados) Darian King (Czech Republic) Dušan Lojda	(Brazil) Thales Turini (Argentina) Alan Kohen (United States) Jesse Witten (Germany) Yannick Maden
February 9	United States F7 Futures; Sunrise, United States; Clay $10,000	(United States) Cătălin-Ionuț Gârd (Barbados) Darian King; 6–2, 6–1	(China) Li Yuanfeng (United States) Wil Spencer	(Barbados) Darian King (Czech Republic) Dušan Lojda	(Brazil) Thales Turini (Argentina) Alan Kohen (United States) Jesse Witten (Germany) Yannick Maden
February 16	Chile F1 Futures; Viña del Mar, Chile; Clay $15,000	(Chile) Juan Carlos Sáez; 4–6, 7–6^{(7–4)}, 6–2	(Chile) Jorge Aguilar	(Spain) Javier Martí (Argentina) Valentín Flórez	(Argentina) Gonzalo Villanueva (Brazil) Tiago Lopes (Brazil) Daniel Dutra da Silva (Brazil) Ricardo Hocevar
February 16	Chile F1 Futures; Viña del Mar, Chile; Clay $15,000	(Brazil) Ricardo Hocevar (Brazil) Tiago Lopes; 6–2, 6–3	(Brazil) Fernando Romboli (Brazil) Caio Silva	(Spain) Javier Martí (Argentina) Valentín Flórez	(Argentina) Gonzalo Villanueva (Brazil) Tiago Lopes (Brazil) Daniel Dutra da Silva (Brazil) Ricardo Hocevar
February 16	Iran F4 Futures; Kish, Iran; Hard $15,000	(France) Jules Marie; 6–1, 6–4	(Slovenia) Grega Žemlja	(Netherlands) Boy Westerhof (Belarus) Ilya Ivashka	(Slovenia) Mike Urbanija (Switzerland) Luca Margaroli (Netherlands) Tallon Griekspoor (France) Mathias Bourgue
February 16	Iran F4 Futures; Kish, Iran; Hard $15,000	(Serbia) Ilija Vučić (Netherlands) Boy Westerhof; 6–3, 7–5	(France) Jérôme Inzerillo (France) Jules Marie	(Netherlands) Boy Westerhof (Belarus) Ilya Ivashka	(Slovenia) Mike Urbanija (Switzerland) Luca Margaroli (Netherlands) Tallon Griekspoor (France) Mathias Bourgue
February 16	Italy F1 Futures; Sondrio, Italy; Hard (indoor) $15,000	(Lithuania) Laurynas Grigelis; 6–7^{(7–9)}, 6–3, 7–5	(France) Quentin Halys	(Netherlands) Niels Lootsma (Belarus) Dzmitry Zhyrmont	(Italy) Lorenzo Sonego (France) Grégoire Barrère (Italy) Edoardo Eremin (Slovakia) Adrian Sikora
February 16	Italy F1 Futures; Sondrio, Italy; Hard (indoor) $15,000	(Italy) Francesco Borgo (Lithuania) Laurynas Grigelis; 6–2, 3–6, [10–7]	(Netherlands) Sander Arends (Netherlands) Niels Lootsma	(Netherlands) Niels Lootsma (Belarus) Dzmitry Zhyrmont	(Italy) Lorenzo Sonego (France) Grégoire Barrère (Italy) Edoardo Eremin (Slovakia) Adrian Sikora
February 16	Egypt F6 Futures; Sharm El Sheikh, Egypt; Hard $10,000	(Czech Republic) Jaroslav Pospíšil; 6–4, 6–4	(Serbia) Nikola Milojević	(Turkey) Cem İlkel (Croatia) Matija Pecotić	(Austria) Maximilian Neuchrist (Switzerland) Sandro Ehrat (Austria) David Pichler (Turkey) Barış Ergüden
February 16	Egypt F6 Futures; Sharm El Sheikh, Egypt; Hard $10,000	(Turkey) Cem İlkel (Turkey) Anıl Yüksel; 6–7^{(1–7)}, 6–3, [10–7]	(Austria) Lucas Miedler (Austria) Maximilian Neuchrist	(Turkey) Cem İlkel (Croatia) Matija Pecotić	(Austria) Maximilian Neuchrist (Switzerland) Sandro Ehrat (Austria) David Pichler (Turkey) Barış Ergüden
February 16	El Salvador F1 Futures; Santa Tecla, El Salvador; Clay $10,000	(Venezuela) David Souto; 6–1, 6–2	(El Salvador) Marcelo Arévalo	(Ecuador) Iván Endara (Argentina) Eduardo Agustín Torre	(Argentina) Matías Franco Descotte (Bolivia) Federico Zeballos (Mexico) Hans Hach Verdugo (Peru) Juan Pablo Varillas
February 16	El Salvador F1 Futures; Santa Tecla, El Salvador; Clay $10,000	(El Salvador) Marcelo Arévalo (Venezuela) Luis David Martínez; 6–4, 6–4	(South Africa) Keith-Patrick Crowley (Mexico) Hans Hach Verdugo	(Ecuador) Iván Endara (Argentina) Eduardo Agustín Torre	(Argentina) Matías Franco Descotte (Bolivia) Federico Zeballos (Mexico) Hans Hach Verdugo (Peru) Juan Pablo Varillas
February 16	Spain F4 Futures; Murcia, Spain; Hard $10,000	(Spain) Rubén Ramírez Hidalgo; 7–6^{(7–4)}, 2–6, 6–3	(Brazil) Rafael Camilo	(France) Julien Obry (Italy) Lorenzo Giustino	(Finland) Micke Kontinen (Spain) Pedro Domínguez Alonso (Spain) José Checa Calvo (Spain) Oriol Roca Batalla
February 16	Spain F4 Futures; Murcia, Spain; Hard $10,000	(Spain) Jaume Munar (Spain) Oriol Roca Batalla; 6–1, 7–6^{(7–4)}	(Russia) Ivan Gakhov (Spain) Miguel Ángel López Jaén	(France) Julien Obry (Italy) Lorenzo Giustino	(Finland) Micke Kontinen (Spain) Pedro Domínguez Alonso (Spain) José Checa Calvo (Spain) Oriol Roca Batalla
February 16	Sri Lanka F3 Futures; Colombo, Sri Lanka; Clay $10,000	(Portugal) Rui Machado; 6–0, 6–3	(Serbia) Miljan Zekić	(South Korea) Lee Duck-hee (Czech Republic) Jan Šátral	(Chinese Taipei) Huang Liang-chi (France) Laurent Recouderc (India) Vinayak Sharma Kaza (United Kingdom) Andrew Bettles
February 16	Sri Lanka F3 Futures; Colombo, Sri Lanka; Clay $10,000	(Serbia) Miljan Zekić (Serbia) Arsenije Zlatanović; 6–2, 6–4	(United States) Andre Dome (New Zealand) Ben McLachlan	(South Korea) Lee Duck-hee (Czech Republic) Jan Šátral	(Chinese Taipei) Huang Liang-chi (France) Laurent Recouderc (India) Vinayak Sharma Kaza (United Kingdom) Andrew Bettles
February 16	Tunisia F6 Futures; Port El Kantaoui, Tunisia; Hard $10,000	(Italy) Erik Crepaldi; 4–6, 7–6^{(7–4)}, 6–0	(Belgium) Yannik Reuter	(Italy) Riccardo Sinicropi (Italy) Pietro Rondoni	(Slovenia) Patrik Fabian (United Kingdom) Scott Clayton (Morocco) Yassine Idmbarek (Germany) Peter Heller
February 16	Tunisia F6 Futures; Port El Kantaoui, Tunisia; Hard $10,000	(France) Tom Jomby (France) Mick Lescure; 6–4, 6–3	(Belgium) Yannik Reuter (United Kingdom) David Rice	(Italy) Riccardo Sinicropi (Italy) Pietro Rondoni	(Slovenia) Patrik Fabian (United Kingdom) Scott Clayton (Morocco) Yassine Idmbarek (Germany) Peter Heller
February 16	Turkey F7 Futures; Antalya, Turkey; Hard $10,000	(Bulgaria) Dimitar Kuzmanov; 7–5, 6–3	(Germany) Marc Sieber	(France) Gleb Sakharov (Romania) Dragoș Dima	(Czech Republic) Robin Staněk (South Africa) Ruan Roelofse (Germany) Cedrik-Marcel Stebe (Latvia) Mārtiņš Podžus
February 16	Turkey F7 Futures; Antalya, Turkey; Hard $10,000	(Ukraine) Marat Deviatiarov (Austria) Tristan-Samuel Weissborn; 7–6^{(7–5)}, 6–2	(South Africa) Ruan Roelofse (South Africa) Tucker Vorster	(France) Gleb Sakharov (Romania) Dragoș Dima	(Czech Republic) Robin Staněk (South Africa) Ruan Roelofse (Germany) Cedrik-Marcel Stebe (Latvia) Mārtiņš Podžus
February 16	United States F8 Futures; Plantation, United States; Clay $10,000	(Argentina) Patricio Heras; 6–4, 6–2	(Brazil) João Menezes	(Monaco) Benjamin Balleret (Brazil) Orlando Luz	(Japan) Naoki Nakagawa (Belgium) Alexandre Folie (United States) Tommy Paul (United States) Cătălin-Ionuț Gârd
February 16	United States F8 Futures; Plantation, United States; Clay $10,000	(United States) Cătălin-Ionuț Gârd (Barbados) Darian King; 6–2, 6–4	(Argentina) Juan Ignacio Galarza (Argentina) Patricio Heras	(Monaco) Benjamin Balleret (Brazil) Orlando Luz	(Japan) Naoki Nakagawa (Belgium) Alexandre Folie (United States) Tommy Paul (United States) Cătălin-Ionuț Gârd
February 23	Australia F1 Futures; Adelaide, Australia; Hard $15,000	(United Kingdom) Brydan Klein; 6–4, 6–7^{(3–7)}, 6–2	(Australia) Omar Jasika	(Australia) Jacob Grills (United States) Alexander Sarkissian	(Australia) Matthew Barton (Australia) Matt Reid (Australia) Gavin van Peperzeel (Australia) Maverick Banes
February 23	Australia F1 Futures; Adelaide, Australia; Hard $15,000	(Australia) Carsten Ball (Australia) Matt Reid; 6–4, 6–3	(Australia) Steven de Waard (Australia) Christopher O'Connell	(Australia) Jacob Grills (United States) Alexander Sarkissian	(Australia) Matthew Barton (Australia) Matt Reid (Australia) Gavin van Peperzeel (Australia) Maverick Banes
February 23	Chile F2 Futures; Viña del Mar, Chile; Clay $15,000	(Spain) Javier Martí; 6–4, 6–1	(Chile) Bastián Malla	(Peru) Duilio Beretta (Spain) Jordi Samper Montaña	(Argentina) Juan Ignacio Ameal (Chile) Jorge Aguilar (Uruguay) Martín Cuevas (Brazil) Daniel Dutra da Silva
February 23	Chile F2 Futures; Viña del Mar, Chile; Clay $15,000	(Chile) Jorge Aguilar (Chile) Hans Podlipnik; 6–4, 7–6^{(7–5)}	(Uruguay) Martín Cuevas (Argentina) Nicolás Kicker	(Peru) Duilio Beretta (Spain) Jordi Samper Montaña	(Argentina) Juan Ignacio Ameal (Chile) Jorge Aguilar (Uruguay) Martín Cuevas (Brazil) Daniel Dutra da Silva
February 23	Iran F5 Futures; Kish, Iran; Hard $15,000	(Slovenia) Grega Žemlja; 6–3, 6–3	(France) Jules Marie	(Belarus) Artur Dubinski (Belarus) Ilya Ivashka	(Netherlands) Boy Westerhof (France) Jérôme Inzerillo (Serbia) Ilija Vučić (France) Mathias Bourgue
February 23	Iran F5 Futures; Kish, Iran; Hard $15,000	(France) Jérôme Inzerillo (France) Jules Marie; 6–3, 6–4	(Venezuela) Jordi Muñoz Abreu (Netherlands) Mark Vervoort	(Belarus) Artur Dubinski (Belarus) Ilya Ivashka	(Netherlands) Boy Westerhof (France) Jérôme Inzerillo (Serbia) Ilija Vučić (France) Mathias Bourgue
February 23	Italy F2 Futures; Trento, Italy; Carpet (indoor) $15,000	(Canada) Philip Bester; 3–6, 7–5, 6–3	(France) Quentin Halys	(Croatia) Viktor Galović (Belarus) Dzmitry Zhyrmont	(Republic of Ireland) Sam Barry (Italy) Lorenzo Frigerio (Italy) Matteo Trevisan (France) Grégoire Barrère
February 23	Italy F2 Futures; Trento, Italy; Carpet (indoor) $15,000	(Netherlands) Sander Arends (Netherlands) Niels Lootsma; 7–6^{(7–2)}, 6–4	(Republic of Ireland) Sam Barry (Croatia) Viktor Galović	(Croatia) Viktor Galović (Belarus) Dzmitry Zhyrmont	(Republic of Ireland) Sam Barry (Italy) Lorenzo Frigerio (Italy) Matteo Trevisan (France) Grégoire Barrère
February 23	Egypt F7 Futures; Sharm El Sheikh, Egypt; Hard $10,000	(Serbia) Marko Tepavac; 6–3, 6–2	(Finland) Henrik Sillanpää	(Czech Republic) Jaroslav Pospíšil (Austria) Pascal Brunner	(Egypt) Sherif Sabry (Austria) Maximilian Neuchrist (United Kingdom) Richard Gabb (Egypt) Karim-Mohamed Maamoun
February 23	Egypt F7 Futures; Sharm El Sheikh, Egypt; Hard $10,000	(Austria) Lucas Miedler (Austria) Maximilian Neuchrist; 6–1, 6–2	(Ukraine) Dmytro Badanov (Russia) Dmitry Surchenko	(Czech Republic) Jaroslav Pospíšil (Austria) Pascal Brunner	(Egypt) Sherif Sabry (Austria) Maximilian Neuchrist (United Kingdom) Richard Gabb (Egypt) Karim-Mohamed Maamoun
February 23	Panama F1 Futures; Panama City, Panama; Clay $10,000	(Barbados) Darian King; 6–2, 6–2	(Austria) Bastian Trinker	(Chile) Julio Peralta (Ecuador) Iván Endara	(Venezuela) David Souto (Japan) Ryusei Makiguchi (Guatemala) Christopher Díaz Figueroa (Colombia) Juan Sebastián Gómez
February 23	Panama F1 Futures; Panama City, Panama; Clay $10,000	(Barbados) Darian King (Chile) Julio Peralta; Walkover	(Ecuador) Iván Endara (Argentina) Eduardo Agustín Torre	(Chile) Julio Peralta (Ecuador) Iván Endara	(Venezuela) David Souto (Japan) Ryusei Makiguchi (Guatemala) Christopher Díaz Figueroa (Colombia) Juan Sebastián Gómez
February 23	Portugal F1 Futures; Vale do Lobo, Portugal; Hard $10,000	(France) Rémi Boutillier; 6–4, 6–4	(Portugal) Rui Machado	(Croatia) Mate Pavić (Spain) Pablo Vivero González	(Germany) Daniel Masur (United Kingdom) Alexander Ward (France) Jordan Ubiergo (Spain) David Vega Hernández
February 23	Portugal F1 Futures; Vale do Lobo, Portugal; Hard $10,000	(Portugal) Romain Barbosa (Portugal) Leonardo Tavares; 3–6, 6–3, [10–6]	(Spain) Juan-Samuel Arauzo-Martínez (Spain) Iván Arenas-Gualda	(Croatia) Mate Pavić (Spain) Pablo Vivero González	(Germany) Daniel Masur (United Kingdom) Alexander Ward (France) Jordan Ubiergo (Spain) David Vega Hernández
February 23	Spain F5 Futures; Cartagena, Spain; Clay $10,000	(Finland) Micke Kontinen; 3–6, 7–6^{(7–2)}, 6–4	(Spain) Rubén Ramírez Hidalgo	(Spain) Gerard Granollers (France) Maxime Chazal	(Spain) Ricardo Ojeda Lara (Italy) Marco Bortolotti (Spain) Sergio Martos Gornés (France) Corentin Moutet
February 23	Spain F5 Futures; Cartagena, Spain; Clay $10,000	(Russia) Alexander Igoshin (Spain) Sergio Martos Gornés; 6–2, 4–6, [11–9]	(Spain) Eduard Esteve Lobato (Germany) Jean-Marc Werner	(Spain) Gerard Granollers (France) Maxime Chazal	(Spain) Ricardo Ojeda Lara (Italy) Marco Bortolotti (Spain) Sergio Martos Gornés (France) Corentin Moutet
February 23	Tunisia F7 Futures; Port El Kantaoui, Tunisia; Hard $10,000	(Norway) Viktor Durasovic; 2–6, 6–4, 6–0	(France) Yannick Jankovits	(Belgium) Arthur De Greef (France) Romain Bauvy	(Italy) Erik Crepaldi (Czech Republic) Petr Michnev (France) Jonathan Kanar (France) Tom Jomby
February 23	Tunisia F7 Futures; Port El Kantaoui, Tunisia; Hard $10,000	(France) Tom Jomby (France) Mick Lescure; 6–2, 6–4	(Italy) Claudio Fortuna (Italy) Omar Giacalone	(Belgium) Arthur De Greef (France) Romain Bauvy	(Italy) Erik Crepaldi (Czech Republic) Petr Michnev (France) Jonathan Kanar (France) Tom Jomby
February 23	Turkey F8 Futures; Antalya, Turkey; Hard $10,000	(Czech Republic) Michal Konečný; 6–3, 6–3	(United States) Peter Kobelt	(Czech Republic) Adam Pavlásek (Sweden) Jonathan Mridha	(Germany) Cedrik-Marcel Stebe (Switzerland) Raphael Baltensperger (South Africa) Tucker Vorster (Sweden) Daniel Windahl
February 23	Turkey F8 Futures; Antalya, Turkey; Hard $10,000	(South Africa) Ruan Roelofse (South Africa) Tucker Vorster; 6–7^{(5–7)}, 7–6^{(7–4)}, [12–10]	(Ukraine) Marat Deviatiarov (Austria) Tristan-Samuel Weissborn	(Czech Republic) Adam Pavlásek (Sweden) Jonathan Mridha	(Germany) Cedrik-Marcel Stebe (Switzerland) Raphael Baltensperger (South Africa) Tucker Vorster (Sweden) Daniel Windahl
February 23	United States F9 Futures; Sunrise, United States; Clay $10,000	(Netherlands) Antal van der Duim; 6–4, 5–7, 6–0	(Brazil) Thales Turini	(Germany) Yannick Maden (United States) Jean-Yves Aubone	(Argentina) Facundo Mena (United States) Connor Smith (Belgium) Alexandre Folie (United States) Dennis Uspensky
February 23	United States F9 Futures; Sunrise, United States; Clay $10,000	(Brazil) Rafael Matos (Brazil) João Menezes; 7–5, 2–6, [10–5]	(Brazil) Bruno Sant'Anna (Brazil) Thales Turini	(Germany) Yannick Maden (United States) Jean-Yves Aubone	(Argentina) Facundo Mena (United States) Connor Smith (Belgium) Alexandre Folie (United States) Dennis Uspensky

=== March ===
Week of	Tournament	Winner	Runners-up	Semifinalists	Quarterfinalists
March 2	Australia F2 Futures; Port Pirie, Australia; Hard $15,000	(Australia) Matthew Barton; 6–3, 6–4	(United States) Alexander Sarkissian	(Australia) Daniel Hobart (Australia) Matt Reid	(United Kingdom) Brydan Klein (Australia) Gavin van Peperzeel (Australia) Christopher O'Connell (Australia) Harry Bourchier
March 2	Australia F2 Futures; Port Pirie, Australia; Hard $15,000	(Australia) Carsten Ball (Australia) Matt Reid; 5–7, 7–6^{(7–1)}, 10–7	(Australia) Steven de Waard (Australia) Jacob Grills	(Australia) Daniel Hobart (Australia) Matt Reid	(United Kingdom) Brydan Klein (Australia) Gavin van Peperzeel (Australia) Christopher O'Connell (Australia) Harry Bourchier
March 2	Canada F1 Futures; Gatineau, Canada; Hard (indoor) $15,000	(United States) Tennys Sandgren; 6–3, 7–6^{(9–7)}	(Canada) Philip Bester	(United States) Nicolas Meister (United States) Daniel Nguyen	(United States) Jarmere Jenkins (United Kingdom) Daniel Smethurst (Canada) Martin Beran (Bulgaria) Dimitar Kutrovsky
March 2	Canada F1 Futures; Gatineau, Canada; Hard (indoor) $15,000	(Belgium) Germain Gigounon (United Kingdom) Daniel Smethurst; 6–4, 6–4	(United States) Kevin King (South Africa) Dean O'Brien	(United States) Nicolas Meister (United States) Daniel Nguyen	(United States) Jarmere Jenkins (United Kingdom) Daniel Smethurst (Canada) Martin Beran (Bulgaria) Dimitar Kutrovsky
March 2	France F4 Futures; Lille, France; Hard (indoor) $15,000	(Russia) Karen Khachanov; 6–1, 6–4	(France) Rudy Coco	(France) Quentin Halys (France) Constant Lestienne	(France) Corentin Denolly (France) Jonathan Eysseric (Germany) Florian Fallert (Belgium) Yannick Mertens
March 2	France F4 Futures; Lille, France; Hard (indoor) $15,000	(Belgium) Yannick Mertens (Netherlands) Boy Westerhof; 6–4, 6–4	(France) Jonathan Eysseric (France) Constant Lestienne	(France) Quentin Halys (France) Constant Lestienne	(France) Corentin Denolly (France) Jonathan Eysseric (Germany) Florian Fallert (Belgium) Yannick Mertens
March 2	Croatia F3 Futures; Umag, Croatia; Clay $10,000	(Italy) Gianluca Naso; 7–5, 6–4	(Poland) Grzegorz Panfil	(Croatia) Antonio Šančić (Italy) Nicola Ghedin	(Romania) Petru-Alexandru Luncanu (Montenegro) Ljubomir Čelebić (Spain) Juan Lizariturry (Czech Republic) Michal Schmid
March 2	Croatia F3 Futures; Umag, Croatia; Clay $10,000	(Italy) Marco Bortolotti (Spain) Juan Lizariturry; 6–3, 7–6^{(8–6)}	(Croatia) Tomislav Draganja (Croatia) Antonio Šančić	(Croatia) Antonio Šančić (Italy) Nicola Ghedin	(Romania) Petru-Alexandru Luncanu (Montenegro) Ljubomir Čelebić (Spain) Juan Lizariturry (Czech Republic) Michal Schmid
March 2	Egypt F8 Futures; Sharm El Sheikh, Egypt; Hard $10,000	(Ukraine) Dmytro Badanov; 6–4, 6–4	(Serbia) Marko Tepavac	(Serbia) Nikola Milojević (France) Théo Fournerie	(Austria) Dennis Novak (Russia) Alexey Vatutin (Sweden) Milos Sekulic (Slovakia) Ivo Klec
March 2	Egypt F8 Futures; Sharm El Sheikh, Egypt; Hard $10,000	(United Kingdom) Scott Clayton (United Kingdom) Richard Gabb; 6–2, 6–4	(France) Louis Tessa (Spain) Bernabé Zapata Miralles	(Serbia) Nikola Milojević (France) Théo Fournerie	(Austria) Dennis Novak (Russia) Alexey Vatutin (Sweden) Milos Sekulic (Slovakia) Ivo Klec
March 2	India F1 Futures; Chandigarh, India; Hard $10,000	(Spain) Enrique López Pérez; 6–2, 6–3	(India) Karunuday Singh	(India) Jeevan Nedunchezhiyan (Italy) Riccardo Ghedin	(South Korea) Kim Jae-hwan (India) Sasikumar Mukund (Spain) David Pérez Sanz (Chinese Taipei) Chen Ti
March 2	India F1 Futures; Chandigarh, India; Hard $10,000	(India) Jeevan Nedunchezhiyan (India) Vijay Sundar Prashanth; 6–3, 6–4	(Spain) Enrique López Pérez (Spain) David Pérez Sanz	(India) Jeevan Nedunchezhiyan (Italy) Riccardo Ghedin	(South Korea) Kim Jae-hwan (India) Sasikumar Mukund (Spain) David Pérez Sanz (Chinese Taipei) Chen Ti
March 2	Nicaragua F1 Futures; Managua, Nicaragua; Hard $10,000	(Mexico) Hans Hach Verdugo; 6–4, 6–3	(Colombia) Juan Sebastián Gómez	(Japan) Kaichi Uchida (Peru) Jorge Panta	(Argentina) Sebastian Exequiel Pini (Argentina) Nicolás Alberto Arreche (United States) Collin Johns (Brazil) Wilson Leite
March 2	Nicaragua F1 Futures; Managua, Nicaragua; Hard $10,000	(Colombia) Juan Sebastián Gómez (Chile) Julio Peralta; 6–3, 6–3	(South Africa) Keith-Patrick Crowley (Mexico) Hans Hach Verdugo	(Japan) Kaichi Uchida (Peru) Jorge Panta	(Argentina) Sebastian Exequiel Pini (Argentina) Nicolás Alberto Arreche (United States) Collin Johns (Brazil) Wilson Leite
March 2	Portugal F2 Futures; Faro, Portugal; Hard $10,000	(Croatia) Mate Pavić; 7–6^{(7–4)}, 6–3	(Spain) Georgi Rumenov Payakov	(Portugal) Pedro Sousa (Spain) Iván Arenas-Gualda	(France) Rémi Boutillier (United Kingdom) Alexander Ward (Spain) Ricardo Ojeda Lara (Portugal) Frederico Gil
March 2	Portugal F2 Futures; Faro, Portugal; Hard $10,000	(Portugal) Nuno Deus (Portugal) Frederico Gil; 6–3, 5–7, [16–14]	(Spain) Juan-Samuel Arauzo-Martínez (Spain) Iván Arenas-Gualda	(Portugal) Pedro Sousa (Spain) Iván Arenas-Gualda	(France) Rémi Boutillier (United Kingdom) Alexander Ward (Spain) Ricardo Ojeda Lara (Portugal) Frederico Gil
March 2	Tunisia F8 Futures; Port El Kantaoui, Tunisia; Hard $10,000	(Italy) Erik Crepaldi; 6–4, 2–6, 7–6^{(7–1)}	(United Kingdom) David Rice	(Italy) Omar Giacalone (Norway) Viktor Durasovic	(Germany) Lennart Zynga (Croatia) Viktor Galović (Belarus) Yaraslav Shyla (France) Yannick Jankovits
March 2	Tunisia F8 Futures; Port El Kantaoui, Tunisia; Hard $10,000	(Belarus) Yaraslav Shyla (Belarus) Andrei Vasilevski; 6–3, 4–6, [10–6]	(Italy) Claudio Grassi (United Kingdom) David Rice	(Italy) Omar Giacalone (Norway) Viktor Durasovic	(Germany) Lennart Zynga (Croatia) Viktor Galović (Belarus) Yaraslav Shyla (France) Yannick Jankovits
March 2	Turkey F9 Futures; Antalya, Turkey; Clay $10,000	(Spain) Oriol Roca Batalla; 7–5, 7–6^{(7–2)}	(Brazil) José Pereira	(Serbia) Miljan Zekić (Austria) Nicolas Reissig	(France) Maxime Chazal (Italy) Riccardo Sinicropi (Spain) Mario Vilella Martínez (Brazil) Leonardo Kirche
March 2	Turkey F9 Futures; Antalya, Turkey; Clay $10,000	(Spain) José Checa Calvo (Spain) Oriol Roca Batalla; 7–6^{(7–4)}, 6–3	(Austria) Lukas Jastraunig (Austria) Nicolas Reissig	(Serbia) Miljan Zekić (Austria) Nicolas Reissig	(France) Maxime Chazal (Italy) Riccardo Sinicropi (Spain) Mario Vilella Martínez (Brazil) Leonardo Kirche
March 9	Australia F3 Futures; Mildura, Australia; Grass $15,000	(Australia) Matthew Barton; 6–4, 6–2	(Australia) Harry Bourchier	(United Kingdom) Brydan Klein (Australia) Dane Propoggia	(United States) Alexander Sarkissian (Australia) Thomas Fancutt (Australia) Oliver Anderson (Australia) Ryan Agar
March 9	Australia F3 Futures; Mildura, Australia; Grass $15,000	(Australia) Carsten Ball (Australia) Matt Reid; 6–2, 6–3	(Australia) Ryan Agar (Australia) Matthew Barton	(United Kingdom) Brydan Klein (Australia) Dane Propoggia	(United States) Alexander Sarkissian (Australia) Thomas Fancutt (Australia) Oliver Anderson (Australia) Ryan Agar
March 9	Canada F2 Futures; Sherbrooke, Canada; Hard (indoor) $15,000	(United Kingdom) Edward Corrie; 3–6, 6–1, 6–3	(United States) Tennys Sandgren	(United States) Eric Quigley (Belgium) Germain Gigounon	(United Kingdom) Daniel Smethurst (Italy) Matteo Donati (Canada) Filip Peliwo (United States) Kevin King
March 9	Canada F2 Futures; Sherbrooke, Canada; Hard (indoor) $15,000	(United States) Kevin King (South Africa) Dean O'Brien; 6–4, 2–6, [10–5]	(United Kingdom) Edward Corrie (United Kingdom) Daniel Smethurst	(United States) Eric Quigley (Belgium) Germain Gigounon	(United Kingdom) Daniel Smethurst (Italy) Matteo Donati (Canada) Filip Peliwo (United States) Kevin King
March 9	Switzerland F1 Futures; Trimbach; Carpet (indoor) $15,000	(Germany) Daniel Brands; 6–3, 6–3	(Russia) Kirill Dmitriev	(Germany) Johannes Härteis (Germany) Elmar Ejupovic	(Switzerland) Yann Marti (Switzerland) Oliver Mrose (Germany) Moritz Baumann (Netherlands) Jelle Sels
March 9	Switzerland F1 Futures; Trimbach; Carpet (indoor) $15,000	(Poland) Adam Majchrowicz (Italy) Matteo Volante; 6–2, 6–4	(Germany) Moritz Baumann (Germany) Florian Fallert	(Germany) Johannes Härteis (Germany) Elmar Ejupovic	(Switzerland) Yann Marti (Switzerland) Oliver Mrose (Germany) Moritz Baumann (Netherlands) Jelle Sels
March 9	Argentina F1 Futures; Guaymallén, Argentina; Clay $10,000	(Argentina) Nicolás Kicker; 6–3, 6–4	(Argentina) Juan Ignacio Galarza	(Argentina) Tomás Lipovšek Puches (Argentina) Juan Pablo Paz	(Japan) Ryusei Makiguchi (Argentina) Hernán Casanova (Argentina) Francisco Bahamonde (Argentina) Federico Coria
March 9	Argentina F1 Futures; Guaymallén, Argentina; Clay $10,000	(Argentina) Nicolás Kicker (Argentina) Mateo Nicolás Martínez; 6–4, 6–7^{(5–7)}, [10–7]	(Switzerland) Jacob Kahoun (Brazil) João Pedro Sorgi	(Argentina) Tomás Lipovšek Puches (Argentina) Juan Pablo Paz	(Japan) Ryusei Makiguchi (Argentina) Hernán Casanova (Argentina) Francisco Bahamonde (Argentina) Federico Coria
March 9	Croatia F4 Futures; Poreč, Croatia; Clay $10,000	(Italy) Matteo Trevisan; 6–0, 6–2	(Serbia) Ivan Bjelica	(Romania) Petru-Alexandru Luncanu (Czech Republic) Dominik Süč	(Czech Republic) Zdeněk Kolář (Croatia) Dino Marcan (Czech Republic) Michal Schmid (Belgium) Arthur De Greef
March 9	Croatia F4 Futures; Poreč, Croatia; Clay $10,000	(Sweden) Markus Eriksson (Sweden) Christian Lindell; 6–1, 6–4	(Romania) Alexandru-Daniel Carpen (Croatia) Tomislav Draganja	(Romania) Petru-Alexandru Luncanu (Czech Republic) Dominik Süč	(Czech Republic) Zdeněk Kolář (Croatia) Dino Marcan (Czech Republic) Michal Schmid (Belgium) Arthur De Greef
March 9	Egypt F9 Futures; Sharm El Sheikh, Egypt; Hard $10,000	(Czech Republic) Jan Šátral; 6–3, 6–4	(Egypt) Mohamed Safwat	(Spain) Íñigo Cervantes Huegun (Greece) Alexandros Jakupovic	(United Kingdom) Scott Clayton (Ukraine) Dmytro Badanov (Russia) Alexandr Igoshin (Switzerland) Jannis Liniger
March 9	Egypt F9 Futures; Sharm El Sheikh, Egypt; Hard $10,000	(Poland) Karol Drzewiecki (Poland) Maciej Smoła; 6–3, 4–6, [10–4]	(Spain) Íñigo Cervantes Huegun (Netherlands) Mark Vervoort	(Spain) Íñigo Cervantes Huegun (Greece) Alexandros Jakupovic	(United Kingdom) Scott Clayton (Ukraine) Dmytro Badanov (Russia) Alexandr Igoshin (Switzerland) Jannis Liniger
March 9	France F5 Futures; Toulouse, France; Hard (indoor) $10,000	(Russia) Karen Khachanov; 6–4, 6–1	(France) Fabien Reboul	(France) Benjamin Bonzi (France) Jonathan Eysseric	(France) Alexandre Sidorenko (France) Maxime Teixeira (France) Hugo Nys (France) Grégoire Barrère
March 9	France F5 Futures; Toulouse, France; Hard (indoor) $10,000	(France) Romain Bauvy (France) Yanaïs Laurent; 6–3, 7–6^{(7–4)}	(France) Hugo Nys (France) Alexandre Sidorenko	(France) Benjamin Bonzi (France) Jonathan Eysseric	(France) Alexandre Sidorenko (France) Maxime Teixeira (France) Hugo Nys (France) Grégoire Barrère
March 9	India F2 Futures; Bhimavaram, India; Hard $10,000+H	(India) Jeevan Nedunchezhiyan; 7–6^{(9–7)}, 6–1	(Spain) David Pérez Sanz	(India) Ramkumar Ramanathan (India) Sriram Balaji	(India) Sumit Nagal (India) Vinayak Sharma Kaza (India) Mohit Mayur Jayaprakash (India) Ranjeet Virali-Murugesan
March 9	India F2 Futures; Bhimavaram, India; Hard $10,000+H	(India) Sriram Balaji (India) Vishnu Vardhan; 6–7^{(5–7)}, 6–3, [10–6]	(India) Ramkumar Ramanathan (India) Ranjeet Virali-Murugesan	(India) Ramkumar Ramanathan (India) Sriram Balaji	(India) Sumit Nagal (India) Vinayak Sharma Kaza (India) Mohit Mayur Jayaprakash (India) Ranjeet Virali-Murugesan
March 9	Israel F1 Futures; Herzliya, Israel; Hard $10,000	(Russia) Evgeny Karlovskiy; 6–7^{(4–7)}, 6–1, 6–2	(France) Martin Vaïsse	(Belarus) Ilya Ivashka (Russia) Alexander Rumyantsev	(Czech Republic) Michal Konečný (Germany) Kevin Krawietz (Italy) Alessandro Bega (Sweden) Patrik Rosenholm
March 9	Israel F1 Futures; Herzliya, Israel; Hard $10,000	(United States) Matt Seeberger (United States) Cameron Silverman; 6–2, 6–2	(France) Jérôme Inzerillo (France) Martin Vaïsse	(Belarus) Ilya Ivashka (Russia) Alexander Rumyantsev	(Czech Republic) Michal Konečný (Germany) Kevin Krawietz (Italy) Alessandro Bega (Sweden) Patrik Rosenholm
March 9	Japan F1 Futures; Nishitama, Japan; Hard $10,000	(Japan) Takuto Niki; 6–3, ret.	(Japan) Yuya Kibi	(Japan) Yuichi Ito (South Korea) Lee Duck-hee	(Australia) Jarryd Chaplin (Italy) Luca Pancaldi (Japan) Gengo Kikuchi (Japan) Ken Onishi
March 9	Japan F1 Futures; Nishitama, Japan; Hard $10,000	(Japan) Yuya Kibi (Japan) Takuto Niki; 6–3, 3–6, [11–9]	(Japan) Yuichi Ito (Japan) Arata Onozawa	(Japan) Yuichi Ito (South Korea) Lee Duck-hee	(Australia) Jarryd Chaplin (Italy) Luca Pancaldi (Japan) Gengo Kikuchi (Japan) Ken Onishi
March 9	Portugal F3 Futures; Loulé, Portugal; Hard $10,000	(Portugal) Rui Machado; 6–4, 7–6^{(8–6)}	(Belgium) Yannick Mertens	(Portugal) Frederico Ferreira Silva (Spain) David Vega Hernández	(Germany) Daniel Masur (Spain) Georgi Rumenov Payakov (Portugal) Nuno Deus (Croatia) Mate Pavić
March 9	Portugal F3 Futures; Loulé, Portugal; Hard $10,000	(Portugal) Romain Barbosa (Portugal) Leonardo Tavares; 6–1, 4–6, [12–10]	(Portugal) João Domingues (Spain) David Vega Hernández	(Portugal) Frederico Ferreira Silva (Spain) David Vega Hernández	(Germany) Daniel Masur (Spain) Georgi Rumenov Payakov (Portugal) Nuno Deus (Croatia) Mate Pavić
March 9	Tunisia F9 Futures; Port El Kantaoui, Tunisia; Hard $10,000	(Italy) Thomas Fabbiano; 6–3, 6–4	(Brazil) Henrique Cunha	(France) Antoine Hoang (France) Sébastien Boltz	(Italy) Giacomo Oradini (Belgium) Yannik Reuter (Poland) Paweł Ciaś (Italy) Stefano Napolitano
March 9	Tunisia F9 Futures; Port El Kantaoui, Tunisia; Hard $10,000	(Germany) Peter Heller (Belgium) Yannik Reuter; 7–5, 6–1	(Tunisia) Anis Ghorbel (Tunisia) Majed Kilani	(France) Antoine Hoang (France) Sébastien Boltz	(Italy) Giacomo Oradini (Belgium) Yannik Reuter (Poland) Paweł Ciaś (Italy) Stefano Napolitano
March 9	Turkey F10 Futures; Antalya, Turkey; Clay $10,000	(Brazil) Leonardo Kirche; 2–6, 7–6^{(7–2)}, 7–6^{(7–5)}	(Spain) Oriol Roca Batalla	(France) Maxime Chazal (Brazil) José Pereira	(Sweden) Mikael Ymer (Germany) Nico Matic (Germany) Tom Schönenberg (Brazil) Rafael Camilo
March 9	Turkey F10 Futures; Antalya, Turkey; Clay $10,000	(Spain) Marc Fornell (Spain) Marco Neubau; 6–4, 6–2	(Brazil) Rafael Camilo (Brazil) Eduardo Russi Assumpção	(France) Maxime Chazal (Brazil) José Pereira	(Sweden) Mikael Ymer (Germany) Nico Matic (Germany) Tom Schönenberg (Brazil) Rafael Camilo
March 16	France F6 Futures; Poitiers, France; Hard (indoor) $15,000+H	(France) Quentin Halys; 7–5, 6–1	(France) David Guez	(France) Jonathan Eysseric (France) Sadio Doumbia	(Belgium) Julien Dubail (France) Lucas Poullain (France) Maxime Quinqueneau (France) Constant Lestienne
March 16	France F6 Futures; Poitiers, France; Hard (indoor) $15,000+H	(France) Grégoire Burquier (France) Alexandre Sidorenko; 6–4, 6–2	(France) Grégoire Jacq (France) Constant Lestienne	(France) Jonathan Eysseric (France) Sadio Doumbia	(Belgium) Julien Dubail (France) Lucas Poullain (France) Maxime Quinqueneau (France) Constant Lestienne
March 16	Great Britain F4 Futures; Wirral, Great Britain; Hard (indoor) $15,000	(Belgium) Yannick Mertens; 6–2, 6–4	(Croatia) Matija Pecotić	(United Kingdom) Daniel Cox (Netherlands) Boy Westerhof	(United Kingdom) Neil Pauffley (United Kingdom) Marcus Willis (Netherlands) Niels Lootsma (Italy) Salvatore Caruso
March 16	Great Britain F4 Futures; Wirral, Great Britain; Hard (indoor) $15,000	(Netherlands) Antal van der Duim (Netherlands) Boy Westerhof; 6–2, 4–6, [10–2]	(United Kingdom) Daniel Cox (United Kingdom) David Rice	(United Kingdom) Daniel Cox (Netherlands) Boy Westerhof	(United Kingdom) Neil Pauffley (United Kingdom) Marcus Willis (Netherlands) Niels Lootsma (Italy) Salvatore Caruso
March 16	Switzerland F2 Futures; Taverne, Switzerland; Carpet (indoor) $15,000	(Czech Republic) Jan Mertl; 6–2, 7–5	(Switzerland) Enzo Sommer	(France) Yannick Jankovits (Germany) Florian Fallert	(Germany) Pirmin Hänle (Russia) Kirill Dmitriev (Italy) Erik Crepaldi (Italy) Claudio Grassi
March 16	Switzerland F2 Futures; Taverne, Switzerland; Carpet (indoor) $15,000	(Germany) Pirmin Hänle (France) Yannick Jankovits; 3–6, 7–6^{(7–2)}, [10–5]	(Czech Republic) Jan Blecha (Czech Republic) Jan Mertl	(France) Yannick Jankovits (Germany) Florian Fallert	(Germany) Pirmin Hänle (Russia) Kirill Dmitriev (Italy) Erik Crepaldi (Italy) Claudio Grassi
March 16	United States F10 Futures; Bakersfield, United States; Hard $15,000	(United States) Frances Tiafoe; 6–1, 6–2	(France) Maxime Tabatruong	(Ecuador) Emilio Gómez (United States) Connor Farren	(Brazil) Fabiano de Paula (Barbados) Darian King (United States) Tommy Paul (United States) Walker Duncan
March 16	United States F10 Futures; Bakersfield, United States; Hard $15,000	(United States) Sekou Bangoura (Barbados) Darian King; 6–4, 4–6, [10–7]	(United States) Mitchell Krueger (United States) Connor Smith	(Ecuador) Emilio Gómez (United States) Connor Farren	(Brazil) Fabiano de Paula (Barbados) Darian King (United States) Tommy Paul (United States) Walker Duncan
March 16	Argentina F2 Futures; Mendoza, Argentina; Clay $10,000	(Dominican Republic) José Hernández; 4–6, 6–2, 6–3	(Chile) Hans Podlipnik	(Argentina) Hernán Casanova (Argentina) Andrés Molteni	(Argentina) Federico Coria (Chile) Bastián Malla (Peru) Juan Pablo Varillas (Chile) Guillermo Rivera Aránguiz
March 16	Argentina F2 Futures; Mendoza, Argentina; Clay $10,000	(Argentina) Juan Ignacio Galarza (Argentina) Tomás Lipovšek Puches; 4–6, 6–2, [10–8]	(Argentina) Francisco Bahamonde (Argentina) Federico Coria	(Argentina) Hernán Casanova (Argentina) Andrés Molteni	(Argentina) Federico Coria (Chile) Bastián Malla (Peru) Juan Pablo Varillas (Chile) Guillermo Rivera Aránguiz
March 16	Croatia F5 Futures; Pula, Croatia; Clay $10,000	(Italy) Riccardo Bellotti; 7–5, 6–4	(France) Mathias Bourgue	(Romania) Vasile Antonescu (Czech Republic) Zdeněk Kolář	(Croatia) Antonio Šančić (Serbia) Laslo Djere (Sweden) Christian Lindell (Belgium) Arthur De Greef
March 16	Croatia F5 Futures; Pula, Croatia; Clay $10,000	(Croatia) Ivan Sabanov (Croatia) Matej Sabanov; 4–6, 6–0, [10–7]	(Czech Republic) Zdeněk Kolář (Czech Republic) Dominik Süč	(Romania) Vasile Antonescu (Czech Republic) Zdeněk Kolář	(Croatia) Antonio Šančić (Serbia) Laslo Djere (Sweden) Christian Lindell (Belgium) Arthur De Greef
March 16	Egypt F10 Futures; Sharm El Sheikh, Egypt; Hard $10,000	(Egypt) Mohamed Safwat; 6–3, 6–7^{(2–7)}, 5–0 retired	(Czech Republic) Jaroslav Pospíšil	(Czech Republic) Jan Šátral (Spain) Íñigo Cervantes Huegun	(Serbia) Danilo Petrović (Sweden) Milos Sekulic (Ukraine) Dmytro Badanov (Poland) Maciej Smoła
March 16	Egypt F10 Futures; Sharm El Sheikh, Egypt; Hard $10,000	(Czech Republic) Roman Jebavý (Czech Republic) Jaroslav Pospíšil; 6–4, 6–3	(Czech Republic) Libor Salaba (Czech Republic) Jan Šátral	(Czech Republic) Jan Šátral (Spain) Íñigo Cervantes Huegun	(Serbia) Danilo Petrović (Sweden) Milos Sekulic (Ukraine) Dmytro Badanov (Poland) Maciej Smoła
March 16	India F3 Futures; Tiruchirappalli, India; Clay $10,000	(India) Vijay Sundar Prashanth; 6–3, 6–4	(India) Ramkumar Ramanathan	(Russia) Ivan Gakhov (India) Sriram Balaji	(France) Yannick Thivant (India) Jeevan Nedunchezhiyan (India) Ranjeet Virali-Murugesan (Argentina) Matías Franco Descotte
March 16	India F3 Futures; Tiruchirappalli, India; Clay $10,000	(India) Arun Prakash Rajagopalan (India) Ramkumar Ramanathan; 3–6, 6–2, [10–6]	(India) Anvit Bendre (India) Akash Wagh	(Russia) Ivan Gakhov (India) Sriram Balaji	(France) Yannick Thivant (India) Jeevan Nedunchezhiyan (India) Ranjeet Virali-Murugesan (Argentina) Matías Franco Descotte
March 16	Israel F2 Futures; Herzliya, Israel; Hard $10,000	(Italy) Stefano Napolitano; 4–6, 6–4, 6–4	(Czech Republic) Michal Konečný	(Germany) Robin Kern (Israel) Bar Tzuf Botzer	(Russia) Evgeny Karlovskiy (United States) Raleigh Smith (Belgium) Joran Vliegen (France) Martin Vaïsse
March 16	Israel F2 Futures; Herzliya, Israel; Hard $10,000	(South Africa) Ruan Roelofse (United States) Matt Seeberger; 2–6, 6–4, [12–10]	(United States) Cameron Silverman (United States) Raleigh Smith	(Germany) Robin Kern (Israel) Bar Tzuf Botzer	(Russia) Evgeny Karlovskiy (United States) Raleigh Smith (Belgium) Joran Vliegen (France) Martin Vaïsse
March 16	Japan F2 Futures; Nishitōkyō, Japan; Hard $10,000	(Japan) Takuto Niki; 6–7^{(4–7)}, 6–4, 6–2	(Japan) Shintaro Imai	(Japan) Hiroyasu Ehara (Chinese Taipei) Yi Chu-huan	(Japan) Masaki Sasai (South Korea) Lee Duck-hee (Italy) Pietro Licciardi (Japan) Makoto Ochi
March 16	Japan F2 Futures; Nishitōkyō, Japan; Hard $10,000	(Japan) Yuichi Ito (Chinese Taipei) Yi Chu-huan; 6–3, 3–6, [12–10]	(Japan) Shintaro Imai (Japan) Yuhei Kono	(Japan) Hiroyasu Ehara (Chinese Taipei) Yi Chu-huan	(Japan) Masaki Sasai (South Korea) Lee Duck-hee (Italy) Pietro Licciardi (Japan) Makoto Ochi
March 16	Morocco F1 Futures; Casablanca, Morocco; Clay $10,000	(Morocco) Lamine Ouahab; 6–3, 6–3	(Spain) Javier Martí	(Finland) Micke Kontinen (France) Maxime Hamou	(Morocco) Yassine Idmbarek (France) Samuel Bensoussan (Ukraine) Gleb Alekseenko (Italy) Daniele Capecchi
March 16	Morocco F1 Futures; Casablanca, Morocco; Clay $10,000	(Monaco) Romain Arneodo (France) Florent Diep; 6–3, 6–7^{(2–7)}, [10–8]	(France) Samuel Bensoussan (Germany) Yannick Maden	(Finland) Micke Kontinen (France) Maxime Hamou	(Morocco) Yassine Idmbarek (France) Samuel Bensoussan (Ukraine) Gleb Alekseenko (Italy) Daniele Capecchi
March 16	Tunisia F10 Futures; Port El Kantaoui, Tunisia; Hard $10,000	(Italy) Thomas Fabbiano; 7–6^{(7–2)}, 4–6, 6–1	(Bulgaria) Alexandar Lazov	(Italy) Lorenzo Giustino (France) Calvin Hemery	(Czech Republic) Adam Pavlásek (Monaco) Benjamin Balleret (Spain) Pol Toledo Bagué (Germany) Peter Heller
March 16	Tunisia F10 Futures; Port El Kantaoui, Tunisia; Hard $10,000	(Italy) Thomas Fabbiano (Italy) Giorgio Portaluri; 6–2, 7–6^{(7–3)}	(Monaco) Benjamin Balleret (France) Hugo Nys	(Italy) Lorenzo Giustino (France) Calvin Hemery	(Czech Republic) Adam Pavlásek (Monaco) Benjamin Balleret (Spain) Pol Toledo Bagué (Germany) Peter Heller
March 16	Turkey F11 Futures; Antalya, Turkey; Hard $10,000	(Venezuela) Ricardo Rodríguez; 6–3, 6–0	(Germany) Marc Sieber	(Bulgaria) Dimitar Kuzmanov (Italy) Edoardo Eremin	(Austria) Tristan-Samuel Weissborn (China) Zhang Zhizhen (Brazil) José Pereira (Italy) Matteo Berrettini
March 16	Turkey F11 Futures; Antalya, Turkey; Hard $10,000	(Bulgaria) Dimitar Kuzmanov (Venezuela) Ricardo Rodríguez; 6–4, 6–1	(Spain) Marc Fornell (Spain) Marco Neubau	(Bulgaria) Dimitar Kuzmanov (Italy) Edoardo Eremin	(Austria) Tristan-Samuel Weissborn (China) Zhang Zhizhen (Brazil) José Pereira (Italy) Matteo Berrettini
March 23	Australia F4 Futures; Melbourne, Australia; Clay $15,000	(Australia) Jordan Thompson; 6–1, 7–5	(New Zealand) Jose Rubin Statham	(Romania) Victor Crivoi (Australia) Dane Propoggia	(Australia) Matt Reid (Australia) Gavin van Peperzeel (Australia) Harry Bourchier (Germany) Peter Torebko
March 23	Australia F4 Futures; Melbourne, Australia; Clay $15,000	(Australia) Jordan Thompson (Australia) Andrew Whittington; 6–2, 7–6^{(7–5)}	(Australia) Steven de Waard (Australia) Marc Polmans	(Romania) Victor Crivoi (Australia) Dane Propoggia	(Australia) Matt Reid (Australia) Gavin van Peperzeel (Australia) Harry Bourchier (Germany) Peter Torebko
March 23	Great Britain F5 Futures; Shrewsbury, Great Britain; Hard (indoor) $15,000	(France) Quentin Halys; 6–4, 3–6, 6–3	(United Kingdom) Daniel Cox	(Italy) Salvatore Caruso (Germany) Jan Choinski	(Austria) Maximilian Neuchrist (United Kingdom) David Rice (United Kingdom) Joshua Milton (United Kingdom) Tom Farquharson
March 23	Great Britain F5 Futures; Shrewsbury, Great Britain; Hard (indoor) $15,000	(United Kingdom) Luke Bambridge (United Kingdom) Scott Clayton; 7–6^{(7–3)}, 6–4	(United Kingdom) Sean Thornley (United Kingdom) Marcus Willis	(Italy) Salvatore Caruso (Germany) Jan Choinski	(Austria) Maximilian Neuchrist (United Kingdom) David Rice (United Kingdom) Joshua Milton (United Kingdom) Tom Farquharson
March 23	United States F11 Futures; Calabasas, United States; Hard $15,000	(United States) Dennis Novikov; 7–6^{(7–4)}, 7–6^{(8–6)}	(United States) Frances Tiafoe	(United States) Jason Jung (United States) Mackenzie McDonald	(United States) Taylor Harry Fritz (United States) Mitchell Krueger (United States) Clay Thompson (Ecuador) Giovanni Lapentti
March 23	United States F11 Futures; Calabasas, United States; Hard $15,000	(United States) Oscar Fabian Matthews (United States) Jeremy Hunter Nicholas; 6–1, 2–6, [10–6]	(Norway) Adrian Forberg Skogeng (United States) Wil Spencer	(United States) Jason Jung (United States) Mackenzie McDonald	(United States) Taylor Harry Fritz (United States) Mitchell Krueger (United States) Clay Thompson (Ecuador) Giovanni Lapentti
March 23	Argentina F3 Futures; Olavarria, Argentina; Clay $10,000	(Dominican Republic) José Hernández; 6–0, 6–1	(Argentina) Federico Coria	(Argentina) Tomás Lipovšek Puches (Argentina) Nicolás Kicker	(Argentina) Juan Pablo Paz (Argentina) Mateo Nicolás Martínez (Argentina) Gonzalo Villanueva (Argentina) Franco Agamenone
March 23	Argentina F3 Futures; Olavarria, Argentina; Clay $10,000	(Brazil) Eduardo Dischinger (Brazil) Thales Turini; 3–6, 6–4, [13–11]	(Brazil) André Miele (Brazil) Alexandre Tsuchiya	(Argentina) Tomás Lipovšek Puches (Argentina) Nicolás Kicker	(Argentina) Juan Pablo Paz (Argentina) Mateo Nicolás Martínez (Argentina) Gonzalo Villanueva (Argentina) Franco Agamenone
March 23	Bahrain F1 Futures; Manama, Bahrain; Hard $10,000	(Germany) Tobias Simon; 7–6^{(7–2)}, 1–6, 6–3	(Netherlands) Scott Griekspoor	(Belgium) Jonas Merckx (Italy) Stefano Napolitano	(Serbia) Marko Tepavac (Slovenia) Tom Kočevar-Dešman (Italy) Matteo Marfia (United States) Matt Seeberger
March 23	Bahrain F1 Futures; Manama, Bahrain; Hard $10,000	(Czech Republic) Dominik Kellovský (Slovenia) Tom Kočevar-Dešman; 7–6^{(7–4)}, 4–6, [10–7]	(South Africa) Ruan Roelofse (United States) Matt Seeberger	(Belgium) Jonas Merckx (Italy) Stefano Napolitano	(Serbia) Marko Tepavac (Slovenia) Tom Kočevar-Dešman (Italy) Matteo Marfia (United States) Matt Seeberger
March 23	Croatia F6 Futures; Rovinj, Croatia; Clay $10,000	(Czech Republic) Dušan Lojda; 7–6^{(9–7)}, 1–6, 6–4	(France) Mathias Bourgue	(Czech Republic) Zdeněk Kolář (Italy) Riccardo Bellotti	(Serbia) Ivan Bjelica (Slovenia) Mike Urbanija (Italy) Matteo Trevisan (North Macedonia) Tomislav Jotovski
March 23	Croatia F6 Futures; Rovinj, Croatia; Clay $10,000	(Croatia) Dino Marcan (Croatia) Antonio Šančić; 6–3, 7–5	(Italy) Federico Gaio (Italy) Matteo Trevisan	(Czech Republic) Zdeněk Kolář (Italy) Riccardo Bellotti	(Serbia) Ivan Bjelica (Slovenia) Mike Urbanija (Italy) Matteo Trevisan (North Macedonia) Tomislav Jotovski
March 23	Egypt F11 Futures; Sharm El Sheikh, Egypt; Hard $10,000	(Czech Republic) Jaroslav Pospíšil; 6–7^{(6–8)}, 6–3, 7–6^{(7–5)}	(Egypt) Mohamed Safwat	(Austria) Christian Trubrig (Austria) Lucas Miedler	(Egypt) Karim-Mohamed Maamoun (Serbia) Danilo Petrović (Czech Republic) Jan Šátral (Czech Republic) Roman Jebavý
March 23	Egypt F11 Futures; Sharm El Sheikh, Egypt; Hard $10,000	(Czech Republic) Roman Jebavý (Czech Republic) Jaroslav Pospíšil; 6–4, 6–2	(Czech Republic) Libor Salaba (Czech Republic) Jan Šátral	(Austria) Christian Trubrig (Austria) Lucas Miedler	(Egypt) Karim-Mohamed Maamoun (Serbia) Danilo Petrović (Czech Republic) Jan Šátral (Czech Republic) Roman Jebavý
March 23	France F7 Futures; Saint-Raphaël, France; Hard (indoor) $10,000	(France) Yanaïs Laurent; 6–2, 6–2	(France) Constant Lestienne	(France) Alexandre Sidorenko (France) Antoine Escoffier	(Belgium) Julien Dubail (France) Thomas Grinberg (Italy) Gianluca Mager (Belgium) Alexandre Folie
March 23	France F7 Futures; Saint-Raphaël, France; Hard (indoor) $10,000	(France) Yannick Jankovits (France) Alexandre Sidorenko; 6–1, 6–4	(Italy) Erik Crepaldi (Italy) Gianluca Mager	(France) Alexandre Sidorenko (France) Antoine Escoffier	(Belgium) Julien Dubail (France) Thomas Grinberg (Italy) Gianluca Mager (Belgium) Alexandre Folie
March 23	Greece F1 Futures; Heraklion, Greece; Hard $10,000	(Ukraine) Vladyslav Manafov; 6–1, 4–6, 7–5	(Czech Republic) Václav Šafránek	(Greece) Konstantinos Economidis (Serbia) Denis Bejtulahi	(Serbia) Nikola Milojević (Czech Republic) Robin Staněk (France) Jérôme Inzerillo (Italy) Alessandro Bega
March 23	Greece F1 Futures; Heraklion, Greece; Hard $10,000	(Greece) Alexandros Jakupovic (Russia) Markos Kalovelonis; 6–4, 6–2	(Romania) Patrick Grigoriu (Romania) Costin Pavăl	(Greece) Konstantinos Economidis (Serbia) Denis Bejtulahi	(Serbia) Nikola Milojević (Czech Republic) Robin Staněk (France) Jérôme Inzerillo (Italy) Alessandro Bega
March 23	India F4 Futures; Chennai, India; Clay $10,000	(India) Vijay Sundar Prashanth; 6–3, 3–6, 7–6^{(8–6)}	(Russia) Ivan Gakhov	(India) Ranjeet Virali-Murugesan (India) Sriram Balaji	(India) Saketh Myneni (Switzerland) Antoine-Michel Alexeev (Argentina) Matías Franco Descotte (France) Yannick Thivant
March 23	India F4 Futures; Chennai, India; Clay $10,000	(India) Chandril Sood (India) Lakshit Sood; 4–6, 7–5, [15–13]	(India) Sriram Balaji (India) Ranjeet Virali-Murugesan	(India) Ranjeet Virali-Murugesan (India) Sriram Balaji	(India) Saketh Myneni (Switzerland) Antoine-Michel Alexeev (Argentina) Matías Franco Descotte (France) Yannick Thivant
March 23	Israel F3 Futures; Ramat HaSharon, Israel; Hard $10,000	(Sweden) Isak Arvidsson; 4–6, 6–3, 6–4	(Israel) Noam Okun	(United Kingdom) Liam Broady (Poland) Andriej Kapaś	(Israel) Ben Patael (Republic of Ireland) Sam Barry (Israel) Tal Goldengoren (Italy) Claudio Fortuna
March 23	Israel F3 Futures; Ramat HaSharon, Israel; Hard $10,000	(Poland) Andriej Kapaś (Slovakia) Adrian Sikora; 7–6^{(7–3)}, 7–5	(United States) Jean-Yves Aubone (United Kingdom) Liam Broady	(United Kingdom) Liam Broady (Poland) Andriej Kapaś	(Israel) Ben Patael (Republic of Ireland) Sam Barry (Israel) Tal Goldengoren (Italy) Claudio Fortuna
March 23	Japan F3 Futures; Kōfu, Japan; Hard $10,000	(South Korea) Lim Yong-kyu; 7–6^{(8–6)}, 6–3	(Japan) Yasutaka Uchiyama	(China) Wu Di (Japan) Akira Santillan	(Japan) Yuichi Ito (Japan) Shuichi Sekiguchi (Japan) Naoki Nakagawa (Japan) Takuto Niki
March 23	Japan F3 Futures; Kōfu, Japan; Hard $10,000	(China) Gao Xin (China) Li Zhe; 6–0, 6–7^{(4–7)}, [10–1]	(Japan) Takashi Saito (Japan) Yusuke Watanuki	(China) Wu Di (Japan) Akira Santillan	(Japan) Yuichi Ito (Japan) Shuichi Sekiguchi (Japan) Naoki Nakagawa (Japan) Takuto Niki
March 23	Morocco F2 Futures; Casablanca, Morocco; Clay $10,000	(Morocco) Lamine Ouahab; 6–0, 7–6^{(7–3)}	(France) Maxime Hamou	(Spain) Marc Giner (Portugal) João Domingues	(Switzerland) Henri Laaksonen (Germany) Nico Matic (Poland) Maciej Rajski (Portugal) Frederico Ferreira Silva
March 23	Morocco F2 Futures; Casablanca, Morocco; Clay $10,000	(Portugal) Gonçalo Falcao (Portugal) Frederico Gil; 7–5, 6–1	(Germany) Jean-Marc Werner (Spain) Marc Giner	(Spain) Marc Giner (Portugal) João Domingues	(Switzerland) Henri Laaksonen (Germany) Nico Matic (Poland) Maciej Rajski (Portugal) Frederico Ferreira Silva
March 23	Spain F6 Futures; Madrid, Spain; Hard $10,000	(Belgium) Yannick Mertens; 4–6, 6–1, 6–2	(Spain) Jaime Pulgar-García	(Spain) Roberto Ortega Olmedo (Spain) Oriol Roca Batalla	(Spain) Iván Arenas-Gualda (Spain) Juan-Samuel Arauzo-Martínez (France) Fabien Reboul (Spain) José Checa Calvo
March 23	Spain F6 Futures; Madrid, Spain; Hard $10,000	(Spain) Jaume Munar (Spain) Oriol Roca Batalla; 6–3, 6–1	(Portugal) Nuno Deus (Portugal) Henrique Sousa	(Spain) Roberto Ortega Olmedo (Spain) Oriol Roca Batalla	(Spain) Iván Arenas-Gualda (Spain) Juan-Samuel Arauzo-Martínez (France) Fabien Reboul (Spain) José Checa Calvo
March 23	Tunisia F11 Futures; Port El Kantaoui, Tunisia; Hard $10,000	(Italy) Thomas Fabbiano; 6–3, 6–1	(Bulgaria) Alexandar Lazov	(United States) Eduardo Nava (Italy) Lorenzo Giustino	(Spain) Mario Vilella Martínez (Monaco) Benjamin Balleret (France) Hugo Nys (Venezuela) Jordi Muñoz Abreu
March 23	Tunisia F11 Futures; Port El Kantaoui, Tunisia; Hard $10,000	(Monaco) Benjamin Balleret (France) Hugo Nys; 7–5, 2–6, [10–4]	(Belgium) Clément Geens (Belgium) Omar Salman	(United States) Eduardo Nava (Italy) Lorenzo Giustino	(Spain) Mario Vilella Martínez (Monaco) Benjamin Balleret (France) Hugo Nys (Venezuela) Jordi Muñoz Abreu
March 23	Turkey F12 Futures; Antalya, Turkey; Hard $10,000	(Bulgaria) Dimitar Kuzmanov; 2–6, 6–0, 6–3	(Serbia) Miki Janković	(Spain) Enrique López Pérez (Russia) Kirill Dmitriev	(Italy) Gianluca Di Nicola (Italy) Filippo Baldi (Venezuela) Ricardo Rodríguez (Austria) Tristan-Samuel Weissborn
March 23	Turkey F12 Futures; Antalya, Turkey; Hard $10,000	(Italy) Filippo Baldi (Italy) Matteo Berrettini; 6–7^{(3–7)}, 6–2, [10–0]	(Italy) Edoardo Eremin (Italy) Lorenzo Sonego	(Spain) Enrique López Pérez (Russia) Kirill Dmitriev	(Italy) Gianluca Di Nicola (Italy) Filippo Baldi (Venezuela) Ricardo Rodríguez (Austria) Tristan-Samuel Weissborn
March 30	Australia F5 Futures; Mornington, Australia; Clay $15,000	(New Zealand) Jose Rubin Statham; 2–6, 6–3, 6–4	(Australia) Matthew Barton	(Australia) Alex Bolt (Germany) Peter Torebko	(Australia) Jarryd Maher (Australia) Gavin van Peperzeel (Australia) Andrew Whittington (Australia) Luke Saville
March 30	Australia F5 Futures; Mornington, Australia; Clay $15,000	(Australia) Steven de Waard (Australia) Marc Polmans; 7–6^{(8–6)}, 6–1	(Australia) Matthew Barton (Germany) Peter Torebko	(Australia) Alex Bolt (Germany) Peter Torebko	(Australia) Jarryd Maher (Australia) Gavin van Peperzeel (Australia) Andrew Whittington (Australia) Luke Saville
March 30	China F1 Futures; Anning, China; Clay $10,000	(Chinese Taipei) Yang Tsung-hua; 7–6^{(7–3)}, 6–4	(Netherlands) Boy Westerhof	(Spain) Enrique López Pérez (Chinese Taipei) Huang Liang-chi	(China) Zhou Shenghao (China) Bai Yan (South Korea) Kim Cheong-eui (China) Ouyang Bowen
March 30	China F1 Futures; Anning, China; Clay $10,000	(Chinese Taipei) Huang Liang-chi (Spain) Enrique López Pérez; 6–3, 4–6, [10–7]	(China) Bai Yan (Chinese Taipei) Yang Tsung-hua	(Spain) Enrique López Pérez (Chinese Taipei) Huang Liang-chi	(China) Zhou Shenghao (China) Bai Yan (South Korea) Kim Cheong-eui (China) Ouyang Bowen
March 30	Croatia F7 Futures; Vrsar, Croatia; Clay $10,000	(Italy) Riccardo Bellotti; 6–4, 3–6, 6–4	(Italy) Federico Gaio	(Croatia) Borut Puc (Czech Republic) Dušan Lojda	(Slovenia) Mike Urbanija (Serbia) Ivan Bjelica (Italy) Nicola Ghedin (Austria) Pascal Brunner
March 30	Croatia F7 Futures; Vrsar, Croatia; Clay $10,000	(Croatia) Ivan Sabanov (Croatia) Matej Sabanov; 6–7^{(3–7)}, 6–4, [10–8]	(Romania) Alexandru-Daniel Carpen (Croatia) Tomislav Draganja	(Croatia) Borut Puc (Czech Republic) Dušan Lojda	(Slovenia) Mike Urbanija (Serbia) Ivan Bjelica (Italy) Nicola Ghedin (Austria) Pascal Brunner
March 30	Egypt F12 Futures; Sharm El Sheikh, Egypt; Hard $10,000	(South Africa) Tucker Vorster; 4–6, 6–3, 6–2	(Czech Republic) Libor Salaba	(Egypt) Karim-Mohamed Maamoun (Czech Republic) Roman Jebavý	(Serbia) Danilo Petrović (Egypt) Sherif Sabry (Czech Republic) Michal Konečný (Egypt) Karim Hossam
March 30	Egypt F12 Futures; Sharm El Sheikh, Egypt; Hard $10,000	(Czech Republic) Roman Jebavý (Czech Republic) Libor Salaba; 3–6, 6–3, [10–8]	(Serbia) Danilo Petrović (Serbia) Ilija Vučić	(Egypt) Karim-Mohamed Maamoun (Czech Republic) Roman Jebavý	(Serbia) Danilo Petrović (Egypt) Sherif Sabry (Czech Republic) Michal Konečný (Egypt) Karim Hossam
March 30	Greece F2 Futures; Heraklion, Greece; Hard $10,000	(Serbia) Peđa Krstin; 6–4, 7–6^{(7–3)}	(Serbia) Nikola Milojević	(Germany) Mats Moraing (Czech Republic) Robin Staněk	(Ukraine) Vladyslav Manafov (Greece) Stefanos Tsitsipas (Belarus) Maxim Dubarenco (Sweden) Mikael Ymer
March 30	Greece F2 Futures; Heraklion, Greece; Hard $10,000	(Greece) Alexandros Jakupovic (Russia) Markos Kalovelonis; 2–6, 7–5, [10–5]	(Romania) Patrick Grigoriu (Romania) Costin Pavăl	(Germany) Mats Moraing (Czech Republic) Robin Staněk	(Ukraine) Vladyslav Manafov (Greece) Stefanos Tsitsipas (Belarus) Maxim Dubarenco (Sweden) Mikael Ymer
March 30	Indonesia F1 Futures; Tarakan, Indonesia; Hard (indoor) $10,000	(Indonesia) Christopher Rungkat; 7–6^{(7–2)}, 1–6, 6–1	(New Zealand) Finn Tearney	(France) Thomas Bréchemier (Thailand) Jirat Navasirisomboon	(South Korea) Kim Jae-hwan (Australia) Darren Polkinghorne (Indonesia) Aditya Hari Sasongko (Vietnam) Lý Hoàng Nam
March 30	Indonesia F1 Futures; Tarakan, Indonesia; Hard (indoor) $10,000	(United States) Matt Seeberger (New Zealand) Finn Tearney; 6–2, 1–6, [10–8]	(Japan) Toshihide Matsui (Indonesia) Christopher Rungkat	(France) Thomas Bréchemier (Thailand) Jirat Navasirisomboon	(South Korea) Kim Jae-hwan (Australia) Darren Polkinghorne (Indonesia) Aditya Hari Sasongko (Vietnam) Lý Hoàng Nam
March 30	Italy F3 Futures; Pula, Italy; Clay $10,000	(Italy) Gianluca Naso; 0–6, 6–4, 6–4	(France) Corentin Moutet	(Spain) Juan Lizariturry (Italy) Riccardo Sinicropi	(Italy) Alessandro Colella (Germany) Florian Fallert (Italy) Gianluca Mager (Italy) Omar Giacalone
March 30	Italy F3 Futures; Pula, Italy; Clay $10,000	(Italy) Omar Giacalone (Italy) Matteo Volante; 7–5, 6–4	(Italy) Francesco Borgo (Italy) Gianluca Naso	(Spain) Juan Lizariturry (Italy) Riccardo Sinicropi	(Italy) Alessandro Colella (Germany) Florian Fallert (Italy) Gianluca Mager (Italy) Omar Giacalone
March 30	Japan F4 Futures; Tsukuba, Japan; Hard $10,000+H	(Japan) Yasutaka Uchiyama; 6–1, 6–2	(Japan) Takuto Niki	(Japan) Hiroyasu Ehara (China) Li Zhe	(Japan) Kento Takeuchi (Japan) Yusuke Watanuki (Japan) Shuichi Sekiguchi (South Korea) Lim Yong-kyu
March 30	Japan F4 Futures; Tsukuba, Japan; Hard $10,000+H	(Japan) Shintaro Imai (Japan) Takuto Niki; 6–2, 6–4	(Australia) Jarryd Chaplin (New Zealand) Ben McLachlan	(Japan) Hiroyasu Ehara (China) Li Zhe	(Japan) Kento Takeuchi (Japan) Yusuke Watanuki (Japan) Shuichi Sekiguchi (South Korea) Lim Yong-kyu
March 30	Morocco F3 Futures; Safi, Morocco; Clay $10,000	(Morocco) Lamine Ouahab; 7–6^{(7–4)}, 6–3	(Spain) Marc Giner	(Portugal) Frederico Ferreira Silva (Portugal) Pedro Sousa	(France) Maxime Chazal (Russia) Alexey Vatutin (Finland) Micke Kontinen (Portugal) João Domingues
March 30	Morocco F3 Futures; Safi, Morocco; Clay $10,000	(France) Maxime Chazal (France) Florent Diep; 7–6^{(7–5)}, 6–2	(Portugal) Gonçalo Falcao (Portugal) Frederico Gil	(Portugal) Frederico Ferreira Silva (Portugal) Pedro Sousa	(France) Maxime Chazal (Russia) Alexey Vatutin (Finland) Micke Kontinen (Portugal) João Domingues
March 30	Qatar F1 Futures; Doha, Qatar; Hard $10,000	(Czech Republic) Jaroslav Pospíšil; 6–0, 7–5	(Portugal) Rui Machado	(Serbia) Marko Tepavac (United Kingdom) James Marsalek	(Belgium) Jonas Merckx (Russia) Kirill Dmitriev (Netherlands) Scott Griekspoor (United Kingdom) David Rice
March 30	Qatar F1 Futures; Doha, Qatar; Hard $10,000	(United Kingdom) James Marsalek (United Kingdom) David Rice; 4–6, 6–4, [10–4]	(Czech Republic) Dominik Kellovský (Czech Republic) Jaroslav Pospíšil	(Serbia) Marko Tepavac (United Kingdom) James Marsalek	(Belgium) Jonas Merckx (Russia) Kirill Dmitriev (Netherlands) Scott Griekspoor (United Kingdom) David Rice
March 30	Spain F7 Futures; Alcalá de Henares, Spain; Hard $10,000	(Spain) José Checa Calvo; 3–6, 6–4, 6–3	(Spain) Georgi Rumenov Payakov	(Spain) Javier Pulgar-García (Spain) Roberto Ortega Olmedo	(Spain) Albert Alcaraz Ivorra (Spain) Miguel Semmler (Portugal) Nuno Deus (Spain) Jorge Hernando Ruano
March 30	Spain F7 Futures; Alcalá de Henares, Spain; Hard $10,000	(Spain) Iván Arenas-Gualda (Spain) Roberto Ortega Olmedo; 3–6, 6–4, [10–6]	(Spain) Juan-Samuel Arauzo-Martínez (Spain) Javier Pulgar-García	(Spain) Javier Pulgar-García (Spain) Roberto Ortega Olmedo	(Spain) Albert Alcaraz Ivorra (Spain) Miguel Semmler (Portugal) Nuno Deus (Spain) Jorge Hernando Ruano
March 30	Tunisia F12 Futures; Port El Kantaoui, Tunisia; Hard $10,000	(Belgium) Clément Geens; 3–6, 6–4, 7–5	(Belgium) Yannick Mertens	(Norway) Viktor Durasovic (Spain) David Pérez Sanz	(Belgium) Omar Salman (France) Théo Fournerie (Russia) Daniil Medvedev (United States) Eduardo Nava
March 30	Tunisia F12 Futures; Port El Kantaoui, Tunisia; Hard $10,000	(Belgium) Julien Cagnina (Belgium) Jeroen Vanneste; 3–6, 6–4, [10–7]	(Spain) David Pérez Sanz (Spain) Jaume Pla Malfeito	(Norway) Viktor Durasovic (Spain) David Pérez Sanz	(Belgium) Omar Salman (France) Théo Fournerie (Russia) Daniil Medvedev (United States) Eduardo Nava
March 30	Turkey F13 Futures; Antalya, Turkey; Hard $10,000	(Austria) Dennis Novak; 6–3, 6–3	(Bosnia and Herzegovina) Tomislav Brkić	(India) Ramkumar Ramanathan (Serbia) Miki Janković	(France) Maxime Janvier (Venezuela) Ricardo Rodríguez (Turkey) Barış Ergüden (Italy) Claudio Fortuna
March 30	Turkey F13 Futures; Antalya, Turkey; Hard $10,000	(United States) Cameron Silverman (United States) Raleigh Smith; 4–6, 6–3, [10–8]	(Turkey) Sarp Ağabigün (Turkey) Efe Yurtacan	(India) Ramkumar Ramanathan (Serbia) Miki Janković	(France) Maxime Janvier (Venezuela) Ricardo Rodríguez (Turkey) Barış Ergüden (Italy) Claudio Fortuna
