= 2015 Aegon Ilkley Trophy – Men's singles =

Men's singles
- 2015 Aegon Ilkley Trophy

Final
- Champion: (United States) Denis Kudla
- Runner-up: (Australia) Matthew Ebden
- Score: 6–3, 6–4

Events
Singles	men	women
Doubles	men	women
- Aegon Ilkley Trophy

This is the first edition of the tournament.

Denis Kudla won the tournament, defeating Matthew Ebden in the final, 6–3, 6–4.

== Seeds ==
1. (Tunisia) Malek Jaziri (second round)
2. (Israel) Dudi Sela (quarterfinals)
3. (Slovenia) Blaž Rola (second round)
4. (Russia) Andrey Kuznetsov (quarterfinals)
5. (Belgium) Kimmer Coppejans (first round)
6. (Spain) Adrián Menéndez-Maceiras (first round)
7. (Croatia) Ivan Dodig (semifinals)
8. (Australia) John Millman (first round)

== Draw ==
Key

- Q = Qualifier
- WC = Wild card
- LL = Lucky loser
- Alt = Alternate
- ITF = ITF entry
- PR = Protected ranking
- SR = Special ranking
- SE = Special exempt
- JE = Junior exempt
- JR = Junior Accelerator Programme entrant
- CO = College Accelerator Programme entrant
- NG = Next Gen Accelerator Program entrant
- w/o = Walkover
- r = Retired
- d = Defaulted

=== Finals ===
Semifinals
(United States) Denis Kudla	6	7^{7}
(Republic of Ireland) James McGee	2	6^{5}
SE	(Australia) Matthew Ebden	6	6
7	(Croatia) Ivan Dodig	1	2

Final
(United States) Denis Kudla	6	6
SE	(Australia) Matthew Ebden	3	4

=== Top half ===
First round
1	(Tunisia) M Jaziri	6	6
(United Kingdom) L Broady	4	4
(Argentina) G Andreozzi	6	3	1
(United States) D Kudla	4	6	6
PR	(Croatia) A Pavić	7^{7}	4	7^{7}
(Australia) J-P Smith	6^{5}	6	6^{5}
Q	(Bosnia and Herzegovina) M Bašić	4	6	6
5	(Belgium) K Coppejans	6	3	4
3	(Slovenia) B Rola	6	7^{8}
(Belgium) M Authom	3	6^{6}
WC	(United Kingdom) L Bambridge	2	6^{6}
(Republic of Ireland) J McGee	6	7^{8}
(India) Y Bhambri	6	6
WC	(United Kingdom) C Norrie	1	0
WC	(United Kingdom) J Milton	1	7^{7}	6
6	(Spain) A Menéndez-Maceiras	6	6^{5}	4

Second round
1	(Tunisia) M Jaziri	4	2
(United States) D Kudla	6	6
PR	(Croatia) A Pavić	4	4
Q	(Bosnia and Herzegovina) M Bašić	6	6
3	(Slovenia) B Rola	5	5
(Republic of Ireland) J McGee	7	7
(India) Y Bhambri	6^{5}	6	3
WC	(United Kingdom) J Milton	7^{7}	4	6

Quarterfinals
(United States) D Kudla	6	5	6
Q	(Bosnia and Herzegovina) M Bašić	3	7	1
(Republic of Ireland) J McGee	6	6
WC	(United Kingdom) J Milton	3	3

Semifinals
(United States) D Kudla	6	7^{7}
(Republic of Ireland) J McGee	2	6^{5}

=== Bottom half ===
First round
8	(Australia) J Millman	1	4
SE	(Australia) M Ebden	6	6
(Chinese Taipei) J Wang	6	6
Q	(Australia) L Saville	3	3
(Belgium) N Desein	5	4
Alt	(Japan) Y Nishioka	7	6
(Poland) M Przysiężny	3	3
4	(Russia) A Kuznetsov	6	6
7	(Croatia) I Dodig	7^{7}	7^{7}
(Russia) A Karatsev	6^{4}	6^{4}
(Japan) H Moriya	2	0
Q	(Australia) A Bolt	6	6
WC	(United Kingdom) M Willis	6^{8}	4
Q	(Slovenia) G Žemlja	7^{10}	6
(Sweden) E Ymer	6	4	3
2	(Israel) D Sela	4	6	6

Second round
SE	(Australia) M Ebden	6	6
(Chinese Taipei) J Wang	3	1
Alt	(Japan) Y Nishioka	6^{2}	3
4	(Russia) A Kuznetsov	7^{7}	6
7	(Croatia) I Dodig	6	6
Q	(Australia) A Bolt	2	4
Q	(Slovenia) G Žemlja	7	1	6^{3}
2	(Israel) D Sela	5	6	7^{7}

Quarterfinals
SE	(Australia) M Ebden	7	6
4	(Russia) A Kuznetsov	5	3
7	(Croatia) I Dodig	7^{7}	6
2	(Israel) D Sela	6^{4}	4

Semifinals
SE	(Australia) M Ebden	6	6
7	(Croatia) I Dodig	1	2
