= 2015 Aegon Ilkley Trophy – Men's doubles =

Men's doubles
- 2015 Aegon Ilkley Trophy

Final
- Champion: (New Zealand) Marcus Daniell (Brazil) Marcelo Demoliner
- Runner-up: (United Kingdom) Ken Skupski (United Kingdom) Neal Skupski
- Score: 7–6^{(7–3)}, 6–4

Events
Singles	men	women
Doubles	men	women
Aegon Ilkley Trophy	· 2016 →

This was the first edition of the tournament since 2008.

Marcus Daniell and Marcelo Demoliner won the tournament, defeating Ken and Neal Skupski in the final, 7–6^{(7–3)}, 6–4.

== Seeds ==
1. (Croatia) Mate Pavić / (New Zealand) Michael Venus (first round)
2. (Australia) Rameez Junaid / (Canada) Adil Shamasdin (quarterfinals)
3. (New Zealand) Marcus Daniell / (Brazil) Marcelo Demoliner (champions)
4. (Germany) Martin Emmrich / (Sweden) Andreas Siljeström (semifinals)

== Draw ==
=== Key ===
- Q = Qualifier
- WC = Wild card
- LL = Lucky loser
- Alt = Alternate
- SE = Special exempt
- PR = Protected ranking
- ITF = ITF entry
- JE = Junior exempt
- w/o = Walkover
- r = Retired
- d = Defaulted
- SR = Special ranking

=== Draw ===
First round
1	(Croatia) M Pavić (New Zealand) M Venus	6^{4}	6^{6}
WC	(United Kingdom) K Skupski (United Kingdom) N Skupski	7^{7}	7^{8}
(China) M Gong (India) D Sharan	2	3
(Slovenia) B Rola (United States) C Buchanan	6	6
4	(Germany) M Emmrich (Sweden) A Siljeström	6	6
(Australia) J Millman (Australia) A Whittington	3	4
WC	(United Kingdom) L Broady (United Kingdom) J Milton	4	4
(Russia) A Kuznetsov (Spain) A Menéndez-Maceiras	6	6
(France) F Martin (India) P Raja	4	6^{6}
WC	(United Kingdom) S Thornley (United Kingdom) D Walsh	6	7^{8}
(Mexico) C Ramírez (Australia) J-P Smith	6^{3}	4
3	(New Zealand) M Daniell (Brazil) M Demoliner	7^{7}	6
(Sweden) J Brunström (Netherlands) M Middelkoop	4	6	[10]
(India) S Devvarman (Philippines) T Huey	6	3	[4]
(Israel) D Sela (Chinese Taipei) J Wang	6^{4}	2
2	(Australia) R Junaid (Canada) A Shamasdin	7^{7}	6

Quarterfinals
WC	(United Kingdom) K Skupski (United Kingdom) N Skupski	6	6
(Slovenia) B Rola (United States) C Buchanan	2	4
4	(Germany) M Emmrich (Sweden) A Siljeström	7^{7}	4	[10]
(Russia) A Kuznetsov (Spain) A Menéndez-Maceiras	6^{2}	6	[5]
WC	(United Kingdom) S Thornley (United Kingdom) D Walsh	7^{7}	3	[2]
3	(New Zealand) M Daniell (Brazil) M Demoliner	6^{2}	6	[10]
(Sweden) J Brunström (Netherlands) M Middelkoop	6^{3}	6	[10]
2	(Australia) R Junaid (Canada) A Shamasdin	7^{7}	4	[8]

Semifinals
WC	(United Kingdom) K Skupski (United Kingdom) N Skupski	3	6	[10]
4	(Germany) M Emmrich (Sweden) A Siljeström	6	3	[4]
3	(New Zealand) M Daniell (Brazil) M Demoliner	7^{7}	6
(Sweden) J Brunström (Netherlands) M Middelkoop	6^{4}	3

Final
WC	(United Kingdom) K Skupski (United Kingdom) N Skupski	6^{3}	4
3	(New Zealand) M Daniell (Brazil) M Demoliner	7^{7}	6
