= 2015 ITF Men's Circuit =

International tennis circuit

Details
- Duration: 5 January 2015 – 27 December 2015
- Edition: 18th
- Tournaments: 693
- Categories: $15,000 tournaments (184) $10,000 tournaments (509)

Achievements (singles)
- Most titles: (Italy) Riccardo Bellotti (7)

The 2015 ITF Men's Circuit is the 2015 edition of the entry level tour for men's professional tennis, and is the third tier tennis tour below the Association of Tennis Professionals, World Tour and Challenger Tour. It is organised by the International Tennis Federation (ITF) who additionally organizes the ITF Women's Circuit which is an entry-level tour for women's professional tennis. Tournaments are organized to offer either $10,000 or $15,000 in prize money and tournaments which offering hospitality to players competing in the main draw give additional ranking points which are valid under the ATP ranking system, and are to be organized by a national association or approved by the ITF Men's Circuit Committee.

The tournaments are played on a rectangular flat surface, commonly referred to as a tennis court. The dimension of a tennis court are defined and regulated by the ITF and the court is 23.78 meters (78.0 feet) long, 10.97 meters (36.0 feet) wide. Its width is 8.23 meters (27.0 feet) for singles matches and 10.97 meters (36.0 feet) for doubles matches. Tennis is played on a variety of surfaces and each surface has its own characteristics which affect the playing style of the game. There are four main types of courts depending on the materials used for the court surface, clay, hard, grass and carpet courts with the ITF classifying five different pace settings ranging from slow to fast.

== Participating host nations ==
- Algeria (ALG)
- Argentina (ARG)
- Australia (AUS)
- Austria (AUT)
- Bahrain (BHR)
- Belarus (BLR)
- Belgium (BEL)
- Bolivia (BOL)
- Bosnia and Herzegovina (BIH)
- Brazil (BRA)
- Bulgaria (BUL)
- Cambodia (CAM)
- Canada (CAN)
- Chile (CHI)
- China (CHN)
- Chinese Taipei (TPE)
- Colombia (COL)
- Cyprus (CYP)
- Czech Republic (CZE)
- Dominican Republic (DOM)
- Egypt (EGY)
- El Salvador (SLV)
- Estonia (EST)
- Finland (FIN)
- France (FRA)
- Gabon (GAB)
- Georgia (GEO)
- Germany (GER)
- Great Britain (GBR)
- Greece (GRE)
- Guam (GUM)
- Guatemala (GUA)
- Honduras (HON)
- Hong Kong (HKG)
- India (IND)
- Indonesia (INA)
- Iran (IRN)
- Ireland (IRL)
- Israel (ISR)
- Italy (ITA)
- Japan (JPN)
- Kazakhstan (KAZ)
- Kuwait (KUW)
- Latvia (LAT)
- Lebanon (LIB)
- Lithuania (LTU)
- Morocco (MAR)
- Mexico (MEX)
- Mozambique (MOZ)
- Netherlands (NED)
- Nicaragua (NCA)
- Nigeria (NGR)
- Norway (NOR)
- Panama (PAN)
- Philippines (PHI)
- Poland (POL)
- Portugal (POR)
- Qatar (QAT)
- Romania (ROU)
- Russia (RUS)
- Serbia (SRB)
- Slovenia (SLO)
- South Africa (RSA)
- South Korea (KOR)
- Spain (ESP)
- Sri Lanka (SRI)
- Sweden (SWE)
- Switzerland (SUI)
- Thailand (THA)
- Tunisia (TUN)
- Turkey (TUR)
- Ukraine (UKR)
- United States (USA)
- Uzbekistan (UZB)
- Venezuela (VEN)
- Zimbabwe (ZIM)

Countries that hosted a tournament in 2015, but did not in 2014.

- Indonesia (INA)
- Lebanon (LIB)
- Panama (PAN)
- Sri Lanka (SRI)

== Schedule ==
=== Key ===
$15,000 tournaments
$10,000 tournaments

=== January–March ===
No.	January				February				March				
No.	5	12	19	26	2	9	16	23	2	9	16	23	30
1	USA F2	USA F4	GER F3	EGY F3	EGY F4	EGY F5	CHI F1	AUS F1	AUS F2	AUS F3	FRA F6	AUS F4	AUS F5
2	GER F1	EGY F1	KAZ F1	GER F4	ESP F2	GUA F1	IRN F4	CHI F2	CAN F1	CAN F2	GBR F4	GBR F5	CHN F1
3	TUR F1	FRA F1	EGY F2	KAZ F2	SRI F1	ESP F3	ITA F1	IRN F5	FRA F4	SUI F1	SUI F2	USA F11	CRO F7
4	USA F1	GER F2	FRA F2	FRA F3	TUN F4	SRI F2	EGY F6	ITA F2	CRO F3	ARG F1	USA F10	ARG F3	EGY F12
5		IRN F1	GBR F1	GBR F2	TUR F5	TUN F5	SLV F1	EGY F7	EGY F8	CRO F4	ARG F2	BHR F1	GRE F2
6		TUN F1	IRN F2	IRN F3		TUR F6	ESP F4	PAN F1	IND F1	EGY F9	CRO F5	CRO F6	INA F1
7		TUR F2	TUN F2	ESP F1		USA F7	SRI F3	POR F1	NCA F1	FRA F5	EGY F10	EGY F11	ITA F3
8		USA F3	TUR F3	TUN F3			TUN F6	ESP F5	POR F2	IND F2	IND F3	FRA F7	JPN F4
9			USA F5	TUR F4			TUR F7	TUN F7	TUN F8	ISR F1	ISR F2	GRE F1	MAR F3
10				USA F6			USA F8	TUR F8	TUR F9	JPN F1	JPN F2	IND F4	QAT F1
11								USA F9		POR F3	MAR F1	ISR F3	ESP F7
12										TUN F9	TUN F10	JPN F3	TUN F12
13										TUR F10	TUR F11	MAR F2	TUR F13
14												ESP F6	
15												TUN F11	
16												TUR F12	

=== April–June ===
No.	April				May				June				
No.	6	13	20	27	4	11	18	25	1	8	15	22	29
1	CHI F3	CHI F4	CHN F4	FRA F9	NGR F2	MEX F3	KOR F1	ARG F7	CHN F7	BIH F5	ITA F14	CAN F3	CAN F4
2	USA F12	USA F13	FRA F8	KAZ F4	ALG F1	ALG F2	MEX F4	CHN F6	LIB F1	LIB F2	NED F1	CHN F8	CHN F9
3	UZB F1	UZB F2	KAZ F3	MEX F1	ARG F4	ARG F5	ALG F3	KOR F2	UZB F3	UZB F4	RUS F4	CZE F4	COL F4
4	CHN F2	CHN F3	ESP F10	NGR F1	CRO F8	BIH F1	ARG F6	ROU F4	USA F16A	USA F16B	THA F4	FRA F11	CZE F5
5	EGY F13	EGY F14	CHI F5	EGY F16	EGY F17	COL F1	BIH F2	RUS F1	BIH F4	BEL F1	BEL F2	NED F2	FRA F12
6	GRE F3	GRE F4	EGY F15	GRE F6	ISR F5	CRO F9	CHN F5	BIH F3	CRO F12	BRA F1	BRA F2	ESP F18	ITA F16
7	INA F2	INA F3	GRE F5	ISR F4	ITA F8	CZE F1	COL F2	COL F3	EGY F21	BUL F1	BUL F2	THA F5	NED F3
8	ITA F4	ITA F5	ITA F6	ITA F7	MEX F2	EGY F18	CRO F10	CRO F11	GEO F4	CRO F13	EGY F23	USA F19	ROU F7
9	QAT F2	QAT F3	THA F1	ESP F11	POR F4	GEO F1	CZE F2	CZE F3	IND F7	EGY F22	FRA F10	AUT F1	USA F21
10	ESP F8	ESP F9	TUN F15	SWE F1	ROU F1	ISR F6	EGY F19	EGY F20	ISR F7	GEO F5	HKG F2	BEL F3	AUT F2
11	TUN F13	TUN F14	TUR F16	THA F2	ESP F12	ITA F9	GEO F2	GEO F3	ITA F12	HKG F1	IND F8	BRA F3	BEL F4
12	TUR F14	TUR F15		TUR F17	SWE F2	POR F5	IND F5	GUM F1	JPN F5	ISR F8	ISR F9	BUL F3	GER F5
13				USA F14	THA F3	ROU F2	ITA F10	IND F6	MEX F5	ITA F13	JPN F7	HKG F3	IND F10
14					TUR F18	ESP F13	POR F6	ITA F11	MOZ F1	JPN F6	MEX F7	IND F9	ESP F19
15					USA F15	SWE F3	ROU F3	POR F7	POR F8	MEX F6	ROU F5	ITA F15	TUR F26
16						TUR F19	ESP F14	ESP F15	RUS F2	MOZ F2	SRB F2	JPN F8	USA F20
17						UKR F1	TUR F20	TUR F21	SLO F1	RUS F3	SLO F3	MEX F8	ZIM F3
18						USA F16	UKR F2	UKR F3	ESP F16	SRB F1	ESP F17	ROU F6	
19									TUR F22	SLO F2	TUR F24	SRB F3	
20										TUR F23	USA F17	TUR F25	
21											ZIM F1	USA F18	
22												ZIM F2	

=== July–September ===
No.	July				August					September			
No.	6	13	20	27	3	10	17	24	31	7	14	21	28
1	COL F5	CHN F10	CAN F5	BEL F8	CHN F12	ARG F8	BLR F2	BRA F5	BEL F13	CAN F9	CAN F10	CAN F11	AUS F6
2	CZE F6	FRA F14	CHN F11	CAN F6	COL F7	BLR F1	BRA F4	CAN F7	CAN F8	FRA F17	FRA F18	EGY F32	POR F12
3	FRA F13	GER F7	IRL F1	COL F6	ITA F21	CHN F13	TPE F1	TPE F2	GAB F2	GBR F9	ARG F12	FRA F19	SWE F5
4	GBR F6	GBR F7	USA F22	FRA F16	RUS F5	ITA F22	ITA F23	GAB F1	GBR F8	RUS F8	BOL F2	ESP F30	ARG F14
5	ITA F17	ITA F18	AUT F5	ITA F20	THA F6	ROU F12	NED F5	ITA F24	RUS F7	ESP F28	CRO F16	SWE F4	CRO F18
6	NED F4	AUT F4	BEL F7	USA F23	USA F24	RUS F6	POL F2	NED F6	AUT F10	ARG F11	EGY F31	ARG F13	EGY F33
7	AUT F3	BEL F6	FRA F15	AUT F6	BEL F9	THA F7	ARG F9	POL F3	CRO F14	BEL F14	IND F14	BOL F3	FRA F20
8	BEL F5	POR F9	GER F8	EGY F24	EGY F25	USA F25	AUT F8	ARG F10	EGY F29	BOL F1	IRI F9	CRO F17	GER F14
9	GER F6	ROU F9	LTU F1	EST F1	FIN F1	AUT F7	BEL F11	AUT F9	IND F12	CRO F15	ITA F27	IND F15	ITA F29
10	ROU F8	SRB F5	POR F10	GER F9	GER F10	BEL F10	EGY F27	BEL F12	IRI F7	EGY F30	SRB F12	ITA F28	ESP F31
11	SRB F4	ESP F21	ROU F10	POR F11	LAT F1	EGY F26	FIN F3	EGY F28	ISR F11	IND F13	ESP F29	SRB F13	TUN F25
12	ESP F20	TUR F28	SRB F6	SRB F7	SVK F4	FIN F2	GER F12	GER F13	ITA F25	IRI F8	TUN F23	TUN F24	TUR F39
13	TUR F27		SVK F2	SVK F3	ESP F24	GER F11	KOR F4	IND F11	KOR F6	ISR F12	TUR F37	TUR F38	UKR F4
14			ESP F22	ESP F23	TUN F17	KOR F3	ROU F13	ISR F10	POL F4	ITA F26	USA F26	USA F27	USA F28
15			TUR F29	TUN F16	TUR F31	POL F1	SRB F9	KOR F5	ROU F15	KOR F7			
16				TUR F30		SRB F8	ESP F26	ROU F14	SUI F5	POL F5			
17						ESP F25	SUI F3	SRB F10	TUN F21	SRB F11			
18						TUN F18	TUN F19	SUI F4	TUR F35	TUN F22			
19						TUR F32	TUR F33	TUN F20		TUR F36			
20								TUR F34					

=== October–December ===
No.	October				November					December		
No.	5	12	19	26	2	9	16	23	30	7	14	21
1	AUS F7	AUS F8	AUS F9	COL F8	COL F9	AUS F10	AUS F11	CZE F7	CZE F8	DOM F2	DOM F3	TUR F52
2	FRA F21	BLR F3	BLR F4	VEN F1	GBR F10	BRA F8	BRA F9	THA F8	DOM F1	NGR F3	NGR F4	
3	KAZ F5	FRA F22	FRA F23	BRA F6	VEN F2	GBR F11	CYP F1	USA F34	THA F9	CAM F3	CHI F10	
4	PHI F1	KAZ F6	EGY F36	EGY F37	BRA F7	VEN F3	EGY F40	CAM F1	USA F35	CHI F9	QAT F6	
5	POR F13	PHI F2	GER F17	EST F2	EGY F38	EGY F39	ESA F2	CYP F2	CAM F2	EGY F43	TUN F36	
6	USA F29	USA F30	GRE F8	GER F18	EST F3	EST F4	IND F16	EGY F41	CHI F8	IND F19	TUR F50	
7	CHI F6	CHI F7	ISR F14	GRE F9	GRE F10	GRE F11	KUW F2	GUA F2	CYP F3	ISR F18		
8	EGY F34	CRO F19	ITA F32	ISR F15	ITA F34	KUW F1	MAR F5	IND F17	EGY F42	QAT F5		
9	GER F15	EGY F35	NOR F1	ITA F33	NOR F3	MAR F4	PER F4	ISR F16	HON F1	TUN F35		
10	ITA F30	GER F16	ESP F34	NOR F2	RSA F1	RSA F2	RSA F3	KUW F3	IND F18	TUR F49		
11	ESP F32	GRE F7	TUN F28	TUN F29	TUN F30	TUN F31	TUN F32	MAR F6	ISR F17			
12	TUN F26	ISR F13	TUR F42	TUR F43	TUR F44	TUR F45	TUR F46	PER F5	PER F6			
13	TUR F40	ITA F31			USA F31	USA F32	USA F33	TUN F33	QAT F4			
14	UKR F5	ESP F33						TUR F47	TUN F34			
15		TUN F27							TUR F48			
16		TUR F41										
17		UKR F6										

== Point distribution ==
Tournament Category	W	F	SF	QF	R16	R32
Futures 15,000+H	35	20	10	4	1	0
Futures 15,000	27	15	8	3	1	0
Futures 10,000+H	27	15	8	3	1	0
Futures 10,000	18	10	6	2	1	0
