= 2015 ITF Women's Circuit =

Details
- Duration: 5 January 2015 – 27 December 2015
- Tournaments: 176

Achievements (singles)
- Most titles: (Bulgaria) Isabella Shinikova (8)
- Most finals: (Bulgaria) Isabella Shinikova (10)

The 2015 ITF Women's Circuit is the 2015 edition of the second-tier tour for women's professional tennis. It is organised by the International Tennis Federation and is a tier below the WTA Tour. The ITF Women's Circuit includes tournaments with prize money ranging from $10,000 up to $100,000.

== Ranking points distribution ==
Description	W	F	SF	QF	R16	R32	Q	Q3	Q2	Q1
ITF $100,000+H (S)	150	90	55	28	14	1	6	4	1	–
ITF $100,000+H (D)	150	90	55	28	1	–	–	–	–	–
ITF $100,000 (S)	140	85	50	25	13	1	6	4	1	–
ITF $100,000 (D)	140	85	50	25	1	–	–	–	–	–
ITF $75,000+H (S)	130	80	48	24	12	1	5	3	1	–
ITF $75,000+H (D)	130	80	48	24	1	–	–	–	–	–
ITF $75,000 (S)	115	70	42	21	10	1	5	3	1	–
ITF $75,000 (D)	115	70	42	21	1	–	–	–	–	–
ITF $50,000+H (S)	100	60	36	18	9	1	5	3	1	–
ITF $50,000+H (D)	100	60	36	18	1	–	–	–	–	–
ITF $50,000 (S)	80	48	29	15	8	1	5	3	1	–
ITF $50,000 (D)	80	48	29	15	1	–	–	–	–	–
ITF $25,000+H (S)	60	36	22	11	6	1	2	–	–	–
ITF $25,000+H (D)	60	36	22	11	1	–	–	–	–	–
ITF $25,000 (S)	50	30	18	9	5	1	1	–	–	–
ITF $25,000 (D)	50	30	18	9	1	–	–	–	–	–
ITF $15,000 (S)	25	15	9	5	1	–	–	–	–	–
ITF $15,000 (D)	25	15	9	1	0	–	–	–	–	–
ITF $10,000 (S)	12	7	4	2	1	–	–	–	–	–
ITF $10,000 (D)	12	7	4	1	0	–	–	–	–	–

"+H" indicates that hospitality is provided.

== Retirements ==
Player	Born	Highest singles/doubles ranking	ITF titles in singles+doubles	Reason
(United Kingdom) Jade Curtis	2 May 1990	325/230	0+4	—
(Italy) Nicole Clerico	8 March 1983	381/171	0+27	—
(Austria) Stefanie Haidner	18 November 1977	232/165	0+18	—
(Chinese Taipei) Hwang I-hsuan	21 September 1988	266/137	0+10	—
(Germany) Sabine Klaschka	8 August 1980	133/271	2+1	—
(Romania) Magda Mihalache	6 July 1981	179/120	5+12	—
(Venezuela) Gabriela Paz	30 September 1991	230/299	8+3	—
(Estonia) Margit Rüütel	4 September 1983	162/192	6+7	—
(Ukraine) Yevgenia Savranska	20 February 1984	172/191	8+11	—
(Japan) Yurika Sema	25 December 1986	142/150	3+14	—
(Romania) Delia Sescioreanu	16 March 1986	145/235	5+2	—
(Lithuania) Lina Stančiūtė	7 February 1986	197/138	4+3	—
(Spain) Beatriz García Vidagany	17 November 1988	146/148	2+4	—
(Japan) Tomoko Yonemura	7 January 1982	148/144	7+11	—

== Comebacks ==
Player	Born	Highest singles/doubles ranking	ITF titles in singles+doubles
(Germany) Sarah Gronert	6 July 1986	164/NR	9+1
(China) Liu Wanting	16 February 1989	310/110	0+13
(China) Lu Jingjing	5 May 1989	178/105	3+11
(Switzerland) Amra Sadiković	6 May 1989	179/148	8+11

== See also ==
- 2015 WTA Tour
- 2015 WTA 125K series
- 2015 ATP World Tour
- 2015 ATP Challenger Tour
- 2015 ITF Men's Circuit
