= 2022 Ilkley Trophy =

Tennis tournament

- Date: 13–19 June 2022
- Edition: 6th
- Category: ATP Challenger Tour 125; ITF Women's World Tennis Tour
- Prize money: €134,920 (men) $100,000 (women)
- Surface: Grass / Outdoor
- Location: Ilkley, United Kingdom

Champions

Men's singles
- (Belgium) Zizou Bergs

Women's singles
- (Hungary) Dalma Gálfi

Men's doubles
- (United Kingdom) Julian Cash / (United Kingdom) Henry Patten

Women's doubles
- (Australia) Lizette Cabrera / (South Korea) Jang Su-jeong
- Ilkley Trophy

The 2022 Ilkley Trophy was a professional tennis tournament played on outdoor grass courts. It was the 6th edition of the tournament which was part of the 2022 ATP Challenger 125 and the 2022 ITF Women's World Tennis Tour. It took place in Ilkley, United Kingdom between 13 and 19 June 2022.

== Champions ==
=== Men's singles ===
- (Belgium) Zizou Bergs def. (United States) Jack Sock 7–6^{(9–7)}, 2–6, 7–6^{(8–6)}.

=== Men's doubles ===
- (United Kingdom) Julian Cash / (United Kingdom) Henry Patten def. (India) Ramkumar Ramanathan / (Australia) John-Patrick Smith 7–5, 6–4.

=== Women's singles ===
- (Hungary) Dalma Gálfi def. (United Kingdom) Jodie Burrage, 7–5, 4–6, 6–3

=== Women's doubles ===
- (Australia) Lizette Cabrera / (South Korea) Jang Su-jeong def. (United Kingdom) Naiktha Bains / (United Kingdom) Maia Lumsden, 6–7^{(7–9)}, 6–0, [11–9]

== Men's singles main-draw entrants ==
=== Seeds ===
Country	Player	Rank^{1}	Seed
AUS	Jordan Thompson	74	1
CZE	Jiří Veselý	76	2
SUI	Henri Laaksonen	89	3
AUS	John Millman	93	4
USA	Jack Sock	110	5
ESP	Fernando Verdasco	118	6
~~AUS~~	~~Jason Kubler~~	~~119~~	~~7~~
AUT	Jurij Rodionov	129	8

- ^{1} Rankings are as of 6 June 2022.

=== Other entrants ===
The following players received wildcards into the main draw:

- (United Kingdom) Arthur Fery
- (United Kingdom) Felix Gill
- (United Kingdom) Aidan McHugh

The following players received entry into the singles main draw as special exempts:

- (Australia) Jordan Thompson
- (Netherlands) ~~Tim van Rijthoven~~

The following player received entry into the singles main draw using a protected ranking:

- (Austria) Sebastian Ofner

The following players received entry from the qualifying draw:

- (Belgium) Zizou Bergs
- (United Kingdom) Charles Broom
- (Netherlands) Gijs Brouwer
- (United Kingdom) Daniel Cox
- (Australia) Rinky Hijikata
- (Germany) Daniel Masur

The following players received entry as lucky losers:

- (Croatia) Borna Gojo
- (Australia) Alexei Popyrin

== Women's singles main draw entrants ==
=== Seeds ===
Country	Player	Rank^{1}	Seed
HUN	Dalma Gálfi	99	1
FRA	Kristina Mladenovic	119	2
USA	Katie Volynets	123	3
UKR	Daria Snigur	130	4
JPN	Mai Hontama	133	5
SWE	Mirjam Björklund	134	6
USA	Robin Anderson	137	7
FRA	Tessah Andrianjafitrimo	141	8

- ^{1} Rankings are as of 6 June 2022.

=== Other entrants ===
The following players received wildcards into the singles main draw:

- (United Kingdom) Jodie Burrage
- (United Kingdom) Sonay Kartal
- (United Kingdom) Yuriko Miyazaki
- (United Kingdom) Mingge Xu

The following player received entry into the singles main draw using a protected ranking:

- (Belgium) Yanina Wickmayer

The following players received entry from the qualifying draw:

- (United Kingdom) Anna Brogan
- (Australia) Priscilla Hon
- (United States) Danielle Lao
- (United Kingdom) Maia Lumsden
- (Latvia) Diāna Marcinkēviča
- (Luxembourg) Mandy Minella
- (United Kingdom) Ranah Stoiber
- (Indonesia) Aldila Sutjiadi
