= 2023 Ilkley Trophy – Women's doubles =

Women's doubles
- 2023 Ilkley Trophy

Final
- Champions: (Japan) Nao Hibino (Serbia) Natalija Stevanović
- Runners-up: (Poland) Maja Chwalińska (Czech Republic) Jesika Malečková
- Score: 7–6^{(12–10)}, 7–6^{(7–5)}

Events
Singles	men	women
Doubles	men	women
← 2022 ·	Ilkley Trophy	· 2024 →

Lizette Cabrera and Jang Su-jeong were the defending champions but chose not to participate.

Nao Hibino and Natalija Stevanović won the title, defeating Maja Chwalińska and Jesika Malečková in the final, 7–6^{(12–10)}, 7–6^{(7–5)}.

== Seeds ==
1. (United States) Sophie Chang / (United States) Quinn Gleason (quarterfinals)
2. (Netherlands) Arianne Hartono / (Australia) Olivia Tjandramulia (first round)
3. (Japan) Mai Hontama / (Japan) Moyuka Uchijima (first round)
4. Alena Fomina-Klotz / (Germany) Julia Lohoff (first round)

== Draw ==
=== Key ===
- Q = Qualifier
- WC = Wild card
- LL = Lucky loser
- Alt = Alternate
- SE = Special exempt
- PR = Protected ranking
- ITF = ITF entry
- JE = Junior exempt
- w/o = Walkover
- r = Retired
- d = Defaulted
- SR = Special ranking

First round
1	(United States) S Chang (United States) Q Gleason	7	4	[10]
(Uzbekistan) N Abduraimova (India) A Raina	5	6	[7]
WC	(United Kingdom) I Lacy (United Kingdom) M Xu	2	3
(Poland) M Chwalińska (Czech Republic) J Malečková	6	6
3	(Japan) M Hontama (Japan) M Uchijima	4	4
(Indonesia) J Rompies (India) P Thombare	6	6
(Sweden) M Björklund (Spain) A Bolsova	6	6
WC	(United Kingdom) L John-Baptiste (United Kingdom) Y Miyazaki	3	0
WC	(United Kingdom) M Brooks (United Kingdom) H Hutchinson	7	6
(Australia) O Gadecki (United Kingdom) E Silva	5	0
(Greece) V Grammatikopoulou (Switzerland) S Waltert	6	7^{7}
4	A Fomina-Klotz (Germany) J Lohoff	4	6^{3}
(Japan) N Hibino (Serbia) N Stevanović	6	6
(Germany) T Korpatsch (United Kingdom) E Webley-Smith	0	4
(France) E Jacquemot (Cyprus) R Șerban	6^{5}	6	[10]
2	(Netherlands) A Hartono (Australia) O Tjandramulia	7^{7}	4	[2]

Quarterfinals
1	(United States) S Chang (United States) Q Gleason	6	6^{4}	[7]
(Poland) M Chwalińska (Czech Republic) J Malečková	4	7^{7}	[10]
(Indonesia) J Rompies (India) P Thombare	w/o
(Sweden) M Björklund (Spain) A Bolsova
WC	(United Kingdom) M Brooks (United Kingdom) H Hutchinson	1	6	[10]
(Greece) V Grammatikopoulou (Switzerland) S Waltert	6	1	[6]
(Japan) N Hibino (Serbia) N Stevanović	2	7^{7}	[10]
(France) E Jacquemot (Cyprus) R Șerban	6	6^{5}	[8]

Semifinals
(Poland) M Chwalińska (Czech Republic) J Malečková	6	7
(Indonesia) J Rompies (India) P Thombare	2	5
WC	(United Kingdom) M Brooks (United Kingdom) H Hutchinson	4	2
(Japan) N Hibino (Serbia) N Stevanović	6	6

Final
(Poland) M Chwalińska (Czech Republic) J Malečková	6^{10}	6^{5}
(Japan) N Hibino (Serbia) N Stevanović	7^{12}	7^{7}
