= 2024 Ilkley Trophy – Women's singles =

Women's singles
- 2024 Ilkley Trophy

Final
- Champion: (Canada) Rebecca Marino
- Runner-up: (France) Jessika Ponchet
- Score: 4–6, 6–1, 6–4

Events
Singles	men	women
Doubles	men	women
← 2023 ·	Ilkley Trophy	· 2025 →

Mirjam Björklund was the defending champion, but chose not to participate.

Rebecca Marino won the title after defeating Jessika Ponchet 4–6, 6–1, 6–4 in the final.

== Seeds ==
1. (China) Bai Zhuoxuan (first round, retired)
2. (Japan) Mai Hontama (first round)
3. (France) Chloé Paquet (second round)
4. (United States) McCartney Kessler (first round)
5. (Ukraine) Daria Snigur (quarterfinals)
6. (Australia) Taylah Preston (second round)
7. (Netherlands) Arianne Hartono (first round)
8. (United Kingdom) Lily Miyazaki (second round)

== Draw ==
=== Key ===
- Q = Qualifier
- WC = Wild card
- LL = Lucky loser
- Alt = Alternate
- ITF = ITF entry
- PR = Protected ranking
- SR = Special ranking
- SE = Special exempt
- JE = Junior exempt
- JR = Junior Accelerator Programme entrant
- CO = College Accelerator Programme entrant
- NG = Next Gen Accelerator Program entrant
- w/o = Walkover
- r = Retired
- d = Defaulted

=== Finals ===
Semifinals
(Australia) Kimberly Birrell	5	6	4
(Canada) Rebecca Marino	7	4	6
(France) Elsa Jacquemot	3	6	3
(France) Jessika Ponchet	6	3	6

Final
(Canada) Rebecca Marino	4	6	6
(France) Jessika Ponchet	6	1	4

=== Top half ===
First round
1	(China) Z Bai	7^{8}	2	0^{r}
(Australia) K Birrell	6^{6}	6	4
Q	(Georgia (country)) M Bolkvadze	6	4	5
Q	(France) H Tan	4	6	7
Q	(Australia) D Aiava	3	6^{4}
WC	(United Kingdom) S Kartal	6	7^{7}
(Romania) E-G Ruse	6	6^{7}	6^{3}
8	(United Kingdom) L Miyazaki	2	7^{9}	7^{7}
4	(United States) M Kessler	6	3	3
(Canada) R Marino	4	6	6
JE	(Slovakia) R Jamrichová	6	5	6^{5}
Q	(United Kingdom) R Stoiber	4	7	7^{7}
Q	(Australia) M Joint	6	3	7^{10}
(Switzerland) S Waltert	1	6	6^{8}
Q	(Turkey) İ Öz	2	1
5	(Ukraine) D Snigur	6	6

Second round
(Australia) K Birrell	6	6
Q	(France) H Tan	4	3
WC	(United Kingdom) S Kartal	6	6
8	(United Kingdom) L Miyazaki	2	4
(Canada) R Marino	6	7^{7}
Q	(United Kingdom) R Stoiber	1	6^{0}
Q	(Australia) M Joint	4	2
5	(Ukraine) D Snigur	6	6

Quarterfinals
(Australia) K Birrell	7^{7}	7
WC	(United Kingdom) S Kartal	6^{4}	5
(Canada) R Marino	6	6
5	(Ukraine) D Snigur	3	3

Semifinals
(Australia) K Birrell	5	6	4
(Canada) R Marino	7	4	6

=== Bottom half ===
First round
6	(Australia) T Preston	4	7	6
(United States) E Mandlik	6	5	1
(Poland) K Kawa	1	3
(Canada) M Stakusic	6	6
(Spain) N Párrizas Díaz	6	2	3
(France) E Jacquemot	3	6	6
WC	(United Kingdom) H Klugman	2	6^{6}
3	(France) C Paquet	6	7^{8}
7	(Netherlands) A Hartono	6^{5}	7	2
Q	(United Kingdom) E McDonald	7^{7}	5	6
Q	(Thailand) L Tararudee	6	6
WC	(United Kingdom) M Xu	1	4
(Ukraine) K Baindl	2	3
(France) J Ponchet	6	6
WC	(United Kingdom) A Banks	6	6
2	(Japan) M Hontama	1	2

Second round
6	(Australia) T Preston	1	2
(Canada) M Stakusic	6	6
(France) E Jacquemot	6	7
3	(France) C Paquet	3	5
Q	(United Kingdom) E McDonald	6^{5}	6	6
Q	(Thailand) L Tararudee	7^{7}	4	1
(France) J Ponchet	4	6	6
WC	(United Kingdom) A Banks	6	3	4

Quarterfinals
(Canada) M Stakusic	4	6^{3}
(France) E Jacquemot	6	7^{7}
Q	(United Kingdom) E McDonald	5	1
(France) J Ponchet	7	6

Semifinals
(France) E Jacquemot	3	6	3
(France) J Ponchet	6	3	6
