= 2023 Ilkley Trophy =

- Date: 18–24 June 2023
- Edition: 7th
- Category: ATP Challenger Tour 125; ITF Women's World Tennis Tour
- Surface: Grass / Outdoor
- Location: Ilkley, United Kingdom

Champions

Men's singles
- (Australia) Jason Kubler

Women's singles
- (Sweden) Mirjam Björklund

Men's doubles
- (Ecuador) Gonzalo Escobar / (Kazakhstan) Aleksandr Nedovyesov

Women's doubles
- (Japan) Nao Hibino / (Serbia) Natalija Stevanović
- Ilkley Trophy

The 2023 Ilkley Trophy was a professional tennis tournament played on outdoor grass courts. It was the 7th edition of the tournament which was part of the 2023 ATP Challenger 125 and the 2023 ITF Women's World Tennis Tour. It took place in Ilkley, United Kingdom between 18 and 24 June 2023.

== Champions ==
=== Men's singles ===
- (Australia) Jason Kubler def. (Austria) Sebastian Ofner 6–4, 6–4.

=== Men's doubles ===
- (Ecuador) Gonzalo Escobar / (Kazakhstan) Aleksandr Nedovyesov def. (United States) Robert Galloway / (Australia) John-Patrick Smith 2–6, 7–5, [11–9].

=== Women's singles ===
- (Sweden) Mirjam Björklund def. (United States) Emma Navarro, 6–4, 7–5

=== Women's doubles ===
- (Japan) Nao Hibino / (Serbia) Natalija Stevanović def. (Poland) Maja Chwalińska / (Czech Republic) Jesika Malečková, 7–6^{(12–10)}, 7–6^{(7–5)}

== Men's singles main-draw entrants ==
=== Seeds ===
| Country | Player | Rank^{1} | Seed |
|---|---|---|---|
| POR | Nuno Borges | 73 | 1 |
| ~~SVK~~ | ~~Alex Molčan~~ | ~~80~~ | ~~2~~ |
| AUT | Sebastian Ofner | 81 | 3 |
| AUS | Jason Kubler | 97 | 4 |
| AUT | Jurij Rodionov | 114 | 5 |
| SUI | Dominic Stricker | 117 | 6 |
| USA | Aleksandar Kovacevic | 119 | 7 |
| JPN | Yosuke Watanuki | 121 | 8 |

- ^{1} Rankings are as of 12 June 2023.

=== Other entrants ===
The following players received wildcards into the main draw:

- (United Kingdom) Johannus Monday
- (United Kingdom) Toby Samuel
- (United Kingdom) Harry Wendelken

The following players received entry into the singles main draw as special exempts:

- (France) Arthur Cazaux
- (Switzerland) Alexander Ritschard

The following players received entry from the qualifying draw:

- (Italy) Mattia Bellucci
- (Australia) Alex Bolt
- (United Kingdom) Charles Broom
- (France) Laurent Lokoli
- (Serbia) Hamad Međedović
- (China) Shang Juncheng

The following player received entry as a lucky loser:

- (Japan) Sho Shimabukuro

== Women's singles main-draw entrants ==
=== Seeds ===
| Country | Player | Rank^{1} | Seed |
|---|---|---|---|
| USA | Emma Navarro | 68 | 1 |
| SVK | Anna Karolína Schmiedlová | 74 | 2 |
| HUN | Dalma Gálfi | 98 | 3 |
| SUI | Simona Waltert | 107 | 4 |
| ESP | Aliona Bolsova | 112 | 5 |
| ~~USA~~ | ~~Kayla Day~~ | ~~116~~ | ~~6~~ |
| JPN | Nao Hibino | 119 | 7 |
| GER | Tamara Korpatsch | 124 | 8 |

- ^{1} Rankings are as of 12 June 2023.

=== Other entrants ===
The following players received wildcards into the main draw:

- (United Kingdom) Anna Brogan
- (United Kingdom) Sonay Kartal
- (United Kingdom) Isabelle Lacy
- (United Kingdom) Yuriko Miyazaki

The following player received entry into the singles main draw using a special ranking:

- (Poland) Maja Chwalińska

The following players received entry from the qualifying draw:

- (Colombia) Emiliana Arango
- (China) Bai Zhuoxuan
- (Chinese Taipei) Joanna Garland
- (Netherlands) Arianne Hartono
- (France) Carole Monnet
- (Netherlands) Lesley Pattinama Kerkhove
- (India) Ankita Raina
- (United States) Katrina Scott

The following player received entry as a lucky loser:

- (Australia) Maddison Inglis
