= 2024 Ilkley Trophy – Women's doubles =

Women's doubles
- 2024 Ilkley Trophy

Final
- Champions: (France) Kristina Mladenovic (Romania) Elena-Gabriela Ruse
- Runners-up: (United States) Quinn Gleason (China) Tang Qianhui
- Score: 6–2, 6–2

Events
Singles	men	women
Doubles	men	women
← 2023 ·	Ilkley Trophy	· 2025 →

Nao Hibino and Natalija Stevanović were the defending champions but chose not to participate.

Kristina Mladenovic and Elena-Gabriela Ruse won the title, defeating Quinn Gleason and Tang Qianhui in the final, 6–2, 6–2.

== Seeds ==
1. (France) Kristina Mladenovic / (Romania) Elena-Gabriela Ruse (champions)
2. (United States) Quinn Gleason / (China) Tang Qianhui (final)
3. (France) Jessika Ponchet / (Netherlands) Bibiane Schoofs (first round)
4. (United States) Sophie Chang / (United States) Alana Smith (first round)

== Draw ==
Key

- Q = Qualifier
- WC = Wild card
- LL = Lucky loser
- Alt = Alternate
- ITF = ITF entry
- PR = Protected ranking
- SR = Special ranking
- SE = Special exempt
- JE = Junior exempt
- JR = Junior Accelerator Programme entrant
- CO = College Accelerator Programme entrant
- NG = Next Gen Accelerator Program entrant
- w/o = Walkover
- r = Retired
- d = Defaulted

First round
1	(France) K Mladenovic (Romania) E-G Ruse	6	6
(Australia) D Aiava (Australia) M Joint	4	4
(Netherlands) A Hartono (India) P Thombare	6	7
WC	(United Kingdom) B Black (United Kingdom) S Pethybridge	2	5
3	(France) J Ponchet (Netherlands) B Schoofs	3	6	[3]
V Diatchenko; I Shymanovich	6	3	[10]
(Netherlands) I Haverlag (United States) A Rogers	3	5
(United States) E Mandlik (Spain) N Párrizas Díaz	6	7
WC	(United Kingdom) L John-Baptiste (United Kingdom) G Roach	7^{7}	4	[13]
WC	(United Kingdom) M Brooks (United Kingdom) M Xu	6^{3}	6	[11]
(United States) C Corley (United States) I Corley	6	6^{5}	[10]
4	(United States) S Chang (United States) A Smith	3	7^{7}	[3]
(France) E Jacquemot (France) C Paquet	4	4
(United States) M Kessler (United States) C Rosca	6	6
(United States) A Li (Canada) R Marino	5	6	[7]
2	(United States) Q Gleason (China) Q Tang	7	4	[10]

Quarterfinals
1	(France) K Mladenovic (Romania) E-G Ruse	6	3	[10]
(Netherlands) A Hartono (India) P Thombare	4	6	[7]
V Diatchenko; I Shymanovich	6	6
(United States) E Mandlik (Spain) N Párrizas Díaz	4	3
WC	(United Kingdom) L John-Baptiste (United Kingdom) G Roach	3	5
(United States) C Corley (United States) I Corley	6	7
(United States) M Kessler (United States) C Rosca	2	2
2	(United States) Q Gleason (China) Q Tang	6	6

Semifinals
1	(France) K Mladenovic (Romania) E-G Ruse	6	6
V Diatchenko; I Shymanovich	2	0
(United States) C Corley (United States) I Corley	4	6	[10]
2	(United States) Q Gleason (China) Q Tang	6	3	[12]

Final
1	(France) K Mladenovic (Romania) E-G Ruse	6	6
2	(United States) Q Gleason (China) Q Tang	2	2
