= 2024 Ilkley Trophy =

- Date: 17–22 June 2024
- Edition: 8th
- Category: ATP Challenger Tour 125; ITF Women's World Tennis Tour
- Surface: Grass / Outdoor
- Location: Ilkley, United Kingdom

Champions

Men's singles
- (Belgium) David Goffin

Women's singles
- (Canada) Rebecca Marino

Men's doubles
- (United States) Evan King / (United States) Reese Stalder

Women's doubles
- (France) Kristina Mladenovic / (Romania) Elena-Gabriela Ruse
- Ilkley Trophy

The 2024 Ilkley Trophy was a professional tennis tournament played on outdoor grass courts. It was the 8th edition of the tournament which was part of the 2024 ATP Challenger 125 and the 2024 ITF Women's World Tennis Tour. It took place in Ilkley, United Kingdom between 17 and 22 June 2024.

== Champions ==
=== Men's singles ===
- (Belgium) David Goffin def. (France) Harold Mayot 6–4, 6–2.

=== Men's doubles ===
- (United States) Evan King / (United States) Reese Stalder def. (United States) Christian Harrison / (France) Fabrice Martin 6–3, 3–6, [10–6].

=== Women's singles ===
- (Canada) Rebecca Marino def. (France) Jessika Ponchet 4–6, 6–1, 6–4

=== Women's doubles ===
- (France) Kristina Mladenovic / (Romania) Elena-Gabriela Ruse def. (United States) Quinn Gleason / (China) Tang Qianhui, 6–2, 6–2

== Men's singles main-draw entrants ==
=== Seeds ===
Country	Player	Rank^{1}	Seed
FRA	Hugo Gaston	82	1
RSA	Lloyd Harris	98	2
FRA	Grégoire Barrère	103	3
BEL	David Goffin	109	4
CHI	Cristian Garín	115	5
FRA	Richard Gasquet	116	6
USA	Zachary Svajda	123	7
ITA	Stefano Napolitano	125	8

- ^{1} Rankings are as of 10 June 2024.

=== Other entrants ===
The following players received wildcards into the main draw:

- (United Kingdom) Arthur Fery
- (United Kingdom) Felix Gill
- (United Kingdom) Ryan Peniston

The following players received entry into the singles main draw as special exempts:

- (Italy) Mattia Bellucci
- (United Kingdom) Charles Broom

The following players received entry from the qualifying draw:

- (Chile) Tomás Barrios Vera
- (France) Benjamin Bonzi
- (United States) Maxime Cressy
- (Canada) Gabriel Diallo
- (United States) Denis Kudla
- (Kazakhstan) Beibit Zhukayev

== Women's singles main-draw entrants ==
=== Seeds ===
Country	Player	Rank^{1}	Seed
CHN	Bai Zhuoxuan	93	1
JPN	Mai Hontama	113	2
FRA	Chloé Paquet	121	3
USA	McCartney Kessler	123	4
UKR	Daria Snigur	127	5
AUS	Taylah Preston	142	6
NED	Arianne Hartono	144	7
GBR	Lily Miyazaki	145	8

- ^{1} Rankings are as of 10 June 2024.

=== Other entrants ===
The following players received wildcards into the main draw:

- (United Kingdom) Amarni Banks
- (United Kingdom) Sonay Kartal
- (United Kingdom) Hannah Klugman
- (United Kingdom) Mingge Xu

The following player received entry into the singles main draw as junior exempts:

- (Slovakia) Renáta Jamrichová

The following players received entry from the qualifying draw:

- (Australia) Destanee Aiava
- (Georgia (country)) Mariam Bolkvadze
- (Australia) Maya Joint
- (United Kingdom) Ella McDonald
- (Turkey) İpek Öz
- (United Kingdom) Ranah Stoiber
- (France) Harmony Tan
- (Thailand) Lanlana Tararudee
