= 2022 Ilkley Trophy – Men's doubles =

Men's doubles
- 2022 Ilkley Trophy

Final
- Champions: (United Kingdom) Julian Cash (United Kingdom) Henry Patten
- Runners-up: (India) Ramkumar Ramanathan (Australia) John-Patrick Smith
- Score: 7–5, 6–4

Events
Singles	men	women
Doubles	men	women
← 2019 ·	Ilkley Trophy	· 2023 →

Santiago González and Aisam-ul-Haq Qureshi were the defending champions but chose not to defend their title.

Julian Cash and Henry Patten won the title after defeating Ramkumar Ramanathan and John-Patrick Smith 7–5, 6–4 in the final.

== Seeds ==
1. (France) Fabrice Martin / (Monaco) Hugo Nys (semifinals)
2. (Mexico) Hans Hach Verdugo / (Austria) Philipp Oswald (first round)
3. (Portugal) Nuno Borges / (Portugal) Francisco Cabral (first round)
4. (Italy) Andrea Vavassori / (Poland) Szymon Walków (first round)

== Draw ==
=== Key ===
- Q = Qualifier
- WC = Wild card
- LL = Lucky loser
- Alt = Alternate
- SE = Special exempt
- PR = Protected ranking
- ITF = ITF entry
- JE = Junior exempt
- w/o = Walkover
- r = Retired
- d = Defaulted
- SR = Special ranking

First round
1	(France) F Martin (Monaco) H Nys	6	7
(Canada) V Pospisil (Italy) A Seppi	3	5
(Germany) D Masur (Austria) J Rodionov	6	4	[10]
PR	(Australia) A Harris (Australia) J Millman	3	6	[8]
3	(Portugal) N Borges (Portugal) F Cabral	6^{5}	5
WC	(United Kingdom) J Cash (United Kingdom) H Patten	7^{7}	7
(Switzerland) H Laaksonen (Switzerland) A Ritschard	6	5	[7]
(United States) N Monroe (United States) M Schnur	3	7	[10]
(Australia) J Kubler (Australia) L Saville	7	7^{7}
(Netherlands) G Brouwer (Netherlands) J de Jong	5	6^{3}
(India) R Ramanathan (Australia) J-P Smith	7^{7}	6
4	(Italy) A Vavassori (Poland) S Walków	6^{4}	2
(France) C Lestienne (France) L Pouille	6	6
(India) D Sharan (New Zealand) A Sitak	4	3
WC	(United Kingdom) L Johnson (United Kingdom) A McHugh	6	6^{3}	[10]
2	(Mexico) H Hach Verdugo (Austria) P Oswald	3	7^{7}	[2]

Quarterfinals
1	(France) F Martin (Monaco) H Nys	6	6
(Germany) D Masur (Austria) J Rodionov	3	4
WC	(United Kingdom) J Cash (United Kingdom) H Patten	6	6
(United States) N Monroe (United States) M Schnur	2	1
(Australia) J Kubler (Australia) L Saville	4	4
(India) R Ramanathan (Australia) J-P Smith	6	6
(France) C Lestienne (France) L Pouille	4	6	[7]
WC	(United Kingdom) L Johnson (United Kingdom) A McHugh	6	4	[10]

Semifinals
1	(France) F Martin (Monaco) H Nys	7^{7}	3	[5]
WC	(United Kingdom) J Cash (United Kingdom) H Patten	6^{3}	6	[10]
(India) R Ramanathan (Australia) J-P Smith	6	7^{7}
WC	(United Kingdom) L Johnson (United Kingdom) A McHugh	3	6^{5}

Final
WC	(United Kingdom) J Cash (United Kingdom) H Patten	7	6
(India) R Ramanathan (Australia) J-P Smith	5	4
