= 2017 Aegon Ilkley Trophy =

- Date: 19–25 June
- Edition: 3rd
- Category: ATP Challenger Tour; ITF Women's Circuit
- Surface: Grass
- Location: Ilkley, United Kingdom

Champions

Men's singles
- (Hungary) Márton Fucsovics

Women's singles
- (Slovakia) Magdaléna Rybáriková

Men's doubles
- (India) Leander Paes / (Canada) Adil Shamasdin

Women's doubles
- (Russia) Anna Blinkova / (Russia) Alla Kudryavtseva
| ← 2016 · | Aegon Ilkley Trophy | · 2018 → |

The 2017 Aegon Ilkley Trophy was a professional tennis tournament played on outdoor grass courts. It was the third edition of the tournament for both men and women. It was part of the 2017 ATP Challenger Tour and the 2017 ITF Women's Circuit. It took place in Ilkley, United Kingdom, on 19–25 June 2017.

== Men's singles main draw entrants ==
=== Seeds ===
| Country | Player | Rank^{1} | Seed |
|---|---|---|---|
| DOM | Víctor Estrella Burgos | 87 | 1 |
| SVK | Norbert Gombos | 89 | 2 |
| RUS | Evgeny Donskoy | 95 | 3 |
| USA | Tennys Sandgren | 100 | 4 |
| JPN | Go Soeda | 108 | 5 |
| BAR | Darian King | 113 | 6 |
| RUS | Konstantin Kravchuk | 115 | 7 |
| UKR | Illya Marchenko | 121 | 8 |

- ^{1} Rankings as of 12 June 2017.

=== Other entrants ===
The following players received wildcards into the singles main draw:

- (United Kingdom) Jay Clarke
- (United Kingdom) Lloyd Glasspool
- (United Kingdom) Brydan Klein
- (United Kingdom) Marcus Willis

The following player received entry into the singles main draw using a protected ranking:

- (India) Yuki Bhambri

The following players received entry into the singles main draw as special exempts:

- (Australia) Sam Groth
- (Italy) Gianluigi Quinzi

The following players received entry from the qualifying draw:

- (Australia) Alex Bolt
- (Australia) Alex De Minaur
- (Australia) Matthew Ebden
- (United States) Dennis Novikov

== Women's singles main draw entrants ==
=== Seeds ===
| Country | Player | Rank^{1} | Seed |
|---|---|---|---|
| FRA | Océane Dodin | 46 | 1 |
| SUI | Viktorija Golubic | 69 | 2 |
| ~~RUS~~ | ~~Ekaterina Alexandrova~~ | ~~76~~ | ~~3~~ |
| RUS | Evgeniya Rodina | 80 | 4 |
| USA | Madison Brengle | 83 | 5 |
| GER | Andrea Petkovic | 84 | 6 |
| USA | Julia Boserup | 87 | 7 |
| JPN | Kurumi Nara | 89 | 8 |

- ^{1} Rankings as of 12 June 2017.

=== Other entrants ===
The following player received a wildcard into the singles main draw:

- (United Kingdom) Freya Christie
- (United Kingdom) Harriet Dart
- (United Kingdom) Laura Robson
- (United Kingdom) Gabriella Taylor

The following player received entry into the singles main draw using a protected ranking:

- (Slovakia) Magdaléna Rybáriková

The following player received entry into the singles main draw as a special exempt:

- (Kazakhstan) Zarina Diyas

The following players received entry from the qualifying draw:

- (United States) Caroline Dolehide
- (Russia) Natela Dzalamidze
- (New Zealand) Marina Erakovic
- (United States) Maria Sanchez

The following player received entry as a lucky loser:

- (Italy) Jasmine Paolini

== Champions ==
=== Men's singles ===
- (Hungary) Márton Fucsovics def. (Australia) Alex Bolt 6–1, 6–4.

=== Women's singles ===
- (Slovakia) Magdaléna Rybáriková def. (Belgium) Alison Van Uytvanck, 7–5, 7–6^{(7–3)}

=== Men's doubles ===
- (India) Leander Paes / (Canada) Adil Shamasdin def. (United Kingdom) Brydan Klein / (United Kingdom) Joe Salisbury 6–2, 2–6, [10–8].

=== Women's doubles ===
- (Russia) Anna Blinkova / (Russia) Alla Kudryavtseva def. (Poland) Paula Kania / (Belgium) Maryna Zanevska, 6–1, 6–4
