= 2022 Ilkley Trophy – Women's doubles =

Women's doubles
- 2022 Ilkley Trophy

Final
- Champions: (Australia) Lizette Cabrera (South Korea) Jang Su-jeong
- Runners-up: (United Kingdom) Naiktha Bains (United Kingdom) Maia Lumsden
- Score: 6–7^{(7–9)}, 6–0, [11–9]

Events
Singles	men	women
Doubles	men	women
← 2019 ·	Ilkley Trophy	· 2023 →

Beatriz Haddad Maia and Luisa Stefani were the defending champions but chose not to participate.

Lizette Cabrera and Jang Su-jeong won the title, defeating Naiktha Bains and Maia Lumsden in the final, 6–7^{(7–9)}, 6–0, [11–9].

== Seeds ==
1. (United States) Emina Bektas / (Indonesia) Aldila Sutjiadi (quarterfinals)
2. (France) Estelle Cascino / (France) Jessika Ponchet (semifinals)
3. (United States) Robin Anderson / (Netherlands) Arianne Hartono (first round)
4. (Brazil) Ingrid Gamarra Martins / (United Kingdom) Emily Webley-Smith (quarterfinals)

== Draw ==
=== Key ===
- Q = Qualifier
- WC = Wild card
- LL = Lucky loser
- Alt = Alternate
- ITF = ITF entry
- PR = Protected ranking
- SR = Special ranking
- SE = Special exempt
- JE = Junior exempt
- JR = Junior Accelerator Programme entrant
- CO = College Accelerator Programme entrant
- NG = Next Gen Accelerator Program entrant
- w/o = Walkover
- r = Retired
- d = Defaulted

=== Draw ===
First round
1	(United States) E Bektas (Indonesia) A Sutjiadi	6	6
(Sweden) M Björklund (United States) J Loeb	2	2
(Japan) Y Naito (Japan) M Uchijima	6^{6}	1
(Australia) L Cabrera (South Korea) S-j Jang	7^{8}	6
3	(United States) R Anderson (Netherlands) A Hartono	6	4	[9]
WC	(United Kingdom) S Kartal (United Kingdom) N Miller	4	6	[11]
(Greece) V Grammatikopoulou (Australia) P Hon	6^{5}	7	[4]
(Australia) Ar Rodionova (Belgium) Y Wickmayer	7^{7}	5	[10]
WC	(United Kingdom) N Bains (United Kingdom) M Lumsden	2	6	[10]
WC	(United Kingdom) R Stoiber (United Kingdom) M Xu	6	4	[8]
(Japan) M Hontama (United States) E Kalieva	6^{3}	1
4	(Brazil) I Gamarra Martins (United Kingdom) E Webley-Smith	7^{7}	6
(France) T Andrianjafitrimo (France) E Jacquemot	7^{7}	6^{4}	[7]
(United States) C McHale (United States) K Volynets	6^{0}	7^{7}	[10]
(Poland) M Chwalińska (Serbia) N Stevanović	6^{2}	6^{4}
2	(France) E Cascino (France) J Ponchet	7^{7}	7^{7}

Quarterfinals
1	(United States) E Bektas (Indonesia) A Sutjiadi	3	4
(Australia) L Cabrera (South Korea) S-j Jang	6	6
WC	(United Kingdom) S Kartal (United Kingdom) N Miller	6	2
(Australia) Ar Rodionova (Belgium) Y Wickmayer	3	1^{r}
WC	(United Kingdom) N Bains (United Kingdom) M Lumsden	2	6	[11]
4	(Brazil) I Gamarra Martins (United Kingdom) E Webley-Smith	6	3	[9]
(United States) C McHale (United States) K Volynets	3	3
2	(France) E Cascino (France) J Ponchet	6	6

Semifinals
(Australia) L Cabrera (South Korea) S-j Jang	7	6
WC	(United Kingdom) S Kartal (United Kingdom) N Miller	5	4
WC	(United Kingdom) N Bains (United Kingdom) M Lumsden	7	6
2	(France) E Cascino (France) J Ponchet	5	1

Final
(Australia) L Cabrera (South Korea) S-j Jang	6^{7}	6	[11]
WC	(United Kingdom) N Bains (United Kingdom) M Lumsden	7^{9}	0	[9]
