= 2016 Aegon Ilkley Trophy =

- Date: 13–19 June
- Edition: 2nd
- Category: ATP Challenger Tour; ITF Women's Circuit
- Prize money: €42,500 (ATP) $50,000 (ITF)
- Surface: Grass
- Location: Ilkley, United Kingdom

Champions

Men's singles
- (Chinese Taipei) Lu Yen-hsun

Women's singles
- (Russia) Evgeniya Rodina

Men's doubles
- (Netherlands) Wesley Koolhof / (Netherlands) Matwé Middelkoop

Women's doubles
- (China) Yang Zhaoxuan / (China) Zhang Kailin
← 2015 ·	Aegon Ilkley Trophy	· 2017 →

The 2016 Aegon Ilkley Trophy was a professional tennis tournament played on outdoor grass courts. It was the second edition of the tournament for both men and women. It was part of the 2016 ATP Challenger Tour and the 2016 ITF Women's Circuit, offering a total prize money of €42,500 for men and $50,000 for women. It took place in Ilkley, United Kingdom, on 13–19 June 2016.

== Men's singles main draw entrants ==
=== Seeds ===
Country	Player	Rank^{1}	Seed
AUS	Jordan Thompson	90	1
TPE	Lu Yen-hsun	97	2
USA	Bjorn Fratangelo	99	3
NED	Igor Sijsling	118	4
USA	Tim Smyczek	123	5
BIH	Mirza Bašić	130	6
SUI	Marco Chiudinelli	131	7
USA	Austin Krajicek	135	8

- ^{1} Rankings as of 6 June 2016.

=== Other entrants ===
The following players received wildcards into the singles main draw:

- (United Kingdom) Liam Broady
- (United Kingdom) Lloyd Glasspool
- (United Kingdom) Brydan Klein
- (United Kingdom) Jonny O'Mara

The following player received entry as a special exemption into the singles main draw:

- (Romania) Marius Copil

The following players received entry from the qualifying draw:

- (Australia) Matthew Barton
- (Russia) Daniil Medvedev
- (Spain) Adrián Menéndez-Maceiras
- (Poland) Michał Przysiężny

== Women's singles main draw entrants ==
=== Seeds ===
Country	Player	Rank^{1}	Seed
CHN	Zhang Kailin	115	1
RUS	Evgeniya Rodina	120	2
RUS	Irina Khromacheva	121	3
CHN	Han Xinyun	123	4
CHN	Duan Yingying	131	5
NED	Richèl Hogenkamp	134	6
UKR	Maryna Zanevska	138	7
SRB	Ivana Jorović	145	8

- ^{1} Rankings as of 6 June 2016.

=== Other entrants ===
The following player received a wildcard into the singles main draw:

- (United Kingdom) Emily Appleton
- (Australia) ~~Ashleigh Barty~~ (withdrew)
- (United Kingdom) Freya Christie
- (United Kingdom) Samantha Murray

The following players received entry from the qualifying draw:

- (Australia) Jaimee Fourlis
- (Tunisia) Ons Jabeur
- (United States) Sanaz Marand
- (Slovakia) Rebecca Šramková

The following player received entry by a lucky loser spot:

- (Australia) Alison Bai

The following player received entry by a protected ranking:

- (Portugal) Michelle Larcher de Brito
- (Croatia) Tereza Mrdeža

The following player received entry by a special exemption:

- (France) Stéphanie Foretz

== Champions ==
=== Men's singles ===
- (Chinese Taipei) Lu Yen-hsun def. (France) Vincent Millot, 7–6^{(7–4)}, 6–2

=== Women's singles ===
- (Russia) Evgeniya Rodina def. (Slovakia) Rebecca Šramková, 6–4, 6–4

=== Men's doubles ===
- (Netherlands) Wesley Koolhof / (Netherlands) Matwé Middelkoop def. (Brazil) Marcelo Demoliner / (Pakistan) Aisam-ul-Haq Qureshi, 7–6^{(7–5)}, 0–6, [10–8]

=== Women's doubles ===
- (China) Yang Zhaoxuan / (China) Zhang Kailin def. (Belgium) An-Sophie Mestach / (Australia) Storm Sanders, 6–3, 7–6^{(7–5)}
