= 2022 Ilkley Trophy – Women's singles =

Women's singles
- 2022 Ilkley Trophy

Final
- Champion: (Hungary) Dalma Gálfi
- Runner-up: (United Kingdom) Jodie Burrage
- Score: 7–5, 4–6, 6–3

Events
Singles	men	women
Doubles	men	women
← 2019 ·	Ilkley Trophy	· 2023 →

Monica Niculescu was the defending champion but chose not to participate.

Dalma Gálfi won the title, defeating Jodie Burrage in the final, 7–5, 4–6, 6–3.

== Seeds ==
1. (Hungary) Dalma Gálfi (champion)
2. (France) Kristina Mladenovic (first round)
3. (United States) Katie Volynets (semifinals)
4. (Ukraine) Daria Snigur (quarterfinals)
5. (Japan) Mai Hontama (second round)
6. (Sweden) Mirjam Björklund (first round)
7. (United States) Robin Anderson (second round)
8. (France) Tessah Andrianjafitrimo (first round)

== Draw ==
=== Key ===
- Q = Qualifier
- WC = Wild card
- LL = Lucky loser
- Alt = Alternate
- ITF = ITF entry
- PR = Protected ranking
- SR = Special ranking
- SE = Special exempt
- JE = Junior exempt
- JR = Junior Accelerator Programme entrant
- CO = College Accelerator Programme entrant
- NG = Next Gen Accelerator Program entrant
- w/o = Walkover
- r = Retired
- d = Defaulted

=== Finals ===
Semifinals
1	(Hungary) Dalma Gálfi	6	3	7^{7}
3	(United States) Katie Volynets	3	6	6^{4}
WC	(United Kingdom) Jodie Burrage	7^{7}	7^{7}
WC	(United Kingdom) Sonay Kartal	6^{4}	6^{1}

Final
1	(Hungary) Dalma Gálfi	7	4	6
WC	(United Kingdom) Jodie Burrage	5	6	3

=== Top half ===
First round
1	(Hungary) D Gálfi	6	6
(United States) C Dolehide	3	4
WC	(United Kingdom) M Xu	2	2
PR	(Belgium) Y Wickmayer	6	6
(Australia) L Cabrera	1	7	3
Q	(Luxembourg) M Minella	6	5	6
(Japan) M Uchijima	4	2
7	(United States) R Anderson	6	6
3	(United States) K Volynets	3	6	6
Q	(United Kingdom) A Brogan	6	2	2
(South Korea) S-j Jang	6	2	2
Q	(Indonesia) A Sutjiadi	4	6	6
(France) J Ponchet	6	2	4
Q	(Australia) P Hon	4	6	6
(Poland) M Chwalińska	6	6
6	(Sweden) M Björklund	4	1

Second round
1	(Hungary) D Gálfi	6	6
PR	(Belgium) Y Wickmayer	4	3
Q	(Luxembourg) M Minella	6	6
7	(United States) R Anderson	2	3
3	(United States) K Volynets	6	6
Q	(Indonesia) A Sutjiadi	3	4
Q	(Australia) P Hon	3	5
(Poland) M Chwalińska	6	7

Quarterfinals
1	(Hungary) D Gálfi	7^{7}	5	6
Q	(Luxembourg) M Minella	6^{3}	7	4
3	(United States) K Volynets	6	7
(Poland) M Chwalińska	1	5

Semifinals
1	(Hungary) D Gálfi	6	3	7^{7}
3	(United States) K Volynets	3	6	6^{4}

=== Bottom half ===
First round
5	(Japan) M Hontama	6	6
Q	(Latvia) D Marcinkēviča	3	4
WC	(United Kingdom) J Burrage	6	7
(Australia) Ar Rodionova	3	5
(United States) J Loeb	6^{5}	3
Q	(United Kingdom) R Stoiber	7^{7}	6
(Greece) V Grammatikopoulou	3	3
4	(Ukraine) D Snigur	6	6
8	(France) T Andrianjafitrimo	4	4
Q	(United States) D Lao	6	6
Q	(United Kingdom) M Lumsden	3	2
(Switzerland) S Waltert	6	6
(Netherlands) A Hartono	3	7^{7}	2
WC	(United Kingdom) S Kartal	6	6^{1}	6
WC	(United Kingdom) Y Miyazaki	6^{4}	6	6
2	(France) K Mladenovic	7^{7}	4	4

Second round
5	(Japan) M Hontama	3	2
WC	(United Kingdom) J Burrage	6	6
Q	(United Kingdom) R Stoiber	2	6	2
4	(Ukraine) D Snigur	6	2	6
(United States) D Lao	4	5
(Switzerland) S Waltert	6	7
WC	(United Kingdom) S Kartal	3	6	6
WC	(United Kingdom) Y Miyazaki	6	3	3

Quarterfinals
WC	(United Kingdom) J Burrage	6	6
4	(Ukraine) D Snigur	2	3
(Switzerland) S Waltert	2	3
WC	(United Kingdom) S Kartal	6	6

Semifinals
WC	(United Kingdom) J Burrage	7^{7}	7^{7}
WC	(United Kingdom) S Kartal	6^{4}	6^{1}
