= 2022 Ilkley Trophy – Men's singles =

Men's singles
- 2022 Ilkley Trophy

Final
- Champion: (Belgium) Zizou Bergs
- Runner-up: (United States) Jack Sock
- Score: 7–6^{(9–7)}, 2–6, 7–6^{(8–6)}

Events
Singles	men	women
Doubles	men	women
← 2019 ·	Ilkley Trophy	· 2023 →

Dominik Koepfer was the defending champion but chose not to defend his title.

Zizou Bergs won the title after defeating Jack Sock 7–6^{(9–7)}, 2–6, 7–6^{(8–6)} in the final.

== Seeds ==
1. (Australia) Jordan Thompson (first round)
2. (Czech Republic) Jiří Veselý (quarterfinals)
3. (Switzerland) Henri Laaksonen (first round)
4. (Australia) John Millman (second round)
5. (United States) Jack Sock (final)
6. (Spain) Fernando Verdasco (second round)
7. (Australia) Jason Kubler (withdrew)
8. (Austria) Jurij Rodionov (first round)

== Draw ==
=== Key ===
- Q = Qualifier
- WC = Wild card
- LL = Lucky loser
- Alt = Alternate
- SE = Special exempt
- PR = Protected ranking
- ITF = ITF entry
- JE = Junior exempt
- w/o = Walkover
- r = Retired
- d = Defaulted
- SR = Special ranking

=== Finals ===
Semifinals
Q	(Belgium) Zizou Bergs	6	7
LL	(Australia) Alexei Popyrin	2	5
(France) Constant Lestienne	5	6	4
5	(United States) Jack Sock	7	2	6

Final
Q	(Belgium) Zizou Bergs	7^{9}	2	7^{8}
5	(United States) Jack Sock	6^{7}	6	6^{6}

=== Top half ===
First round
1/SE	(Australia) J Thompson	4	5
(Portugal) N Borges	6	7
(Italy) A Seppi	6	6
Q	(Australia) R Hijikata	4	1
Q	(United Kingdom) C Broom	6^{1}	6^{1}
Q	(United Kingdom) D Cox	7^{7}	7^{7}
Q	(Belgium) Z Bergs	5	7	6
8	(Austria) J Rodionov	7	5	2
4	(Australia) J Millman	6	6
WC	(United Kingdom) F Gill	3	3
Q	(Netherlands) G Brouwer	7	6
(France) L Pouille	5	4
PR	(Austria) S Ofner	7^{10}	6
(Netherlands) J de Jong	6^{8}	3
LL	(Croatia) B Gojo	6^{5}	6^{6}
LL	(Australia) A Popyrin	7^{7}	7^{8}

Second round
(Portugal) N Borges	4	5
(Italy) A Seppi	6	7
Q	(United Kingdom) D Cox	6^{2}	4
Q	(Belgium) Z Bergs	7^{7}	6
4	(Australia) J Millman	4	2
Q	(Netherlands) G Brouwer	6	6
PR	(Austria) S Ofner	7^{7}	6^{4}	6^{5}
LL	(Australia) A Popyrin	6^{2}	7^{7}	7^{7}

Quarterfinals
(Italy) A Seppi	2	7	3
Q	(Belgium) Z Bergs	6	5	6
Q	(Netherlands) G Brouwer	0	5
LL	(Australia) A Popyrin	6	7

Semifinals
Q	(Belgium) Z Bergs	6	7
LL	(Australia) A Popyrin	2	5

=== Bottom half ===
First round
6	(Spain) F Verdasco	6	0
(Kazakhstan) M Kukushkin	0	0^{r}
(France) C Lestienne	4	7	6
WC	(United Kingdom) A Fery	6	5	3
(Canada) V Pospisil	6	6
WC	(United Kingdom) A McHugh	3	4
(France) P-H Herbert	6	6
3	(Switzerland) H Laaksonen	4	2
5	(United States) J Sock	6	6
(United States) M Mmoh	3	3
(United States) E Escobedo	7^{12}	3	3
Q	(Germany) D Masur	6^{10}	6	6
(France) H Grenier	7^{7}	7
(India) R Ramanathan	6^{3}	5
(Turkey) A Çelikbilek	6^{3}	1
2	(Czech Republic) J Veselý	7^{7}	6

Second round
6	(Spain) F Verdasco	3	5
(France) C Lestienne	6	7
(Canada) V Pospisil	3	6^{2}
(France) P-H Herbert	6	7^{7}
5	(United States) J Sock	6	7^{7}
Q	(Germany) D Masur	2	6^{4}
(France) H Grenier	3	7^{7}	3
2	(Czech Republic) J Veselý	6	6^{5}	6

Quarterfinals
(France) C Lestienne	6	2	2
(France) P-H Herbert	4	6	3^{r}
5	(United States) J Sock	7^{7}	3	7^{7}
2	(Czech Republic) J Veselý	6^{4}	6	6^{3}

Semifinals
(France) C Lestienne	5	6	4
5	(United States) J Sock	7	2	6
