= 2017 Aegon Ilkley Trophy – Men's doubles =

Men's doubles
- 2017 Aegon Ilkley Trophy

Final
- Champions: (India) Leander Paes (Canada) Adil Shamasdin
- Runners-up: (United Kingdom) Brydan Klein (United Kingdom) Joe Salisbury
- Score: 6–2, 2–6, [10–8]

Events
Singles	men	women
Doubles	men	women
← 2016 ·	Aegon Ilkley Trophy	· 2018 →

Wesley Koolhof and Matwé Middelkoop were the defending champions but chose not to defend their title.

Leander Paes and Adil Shamasdin won the title after defeating Brydan Klein and Joe Salisbury 6–2, 2–6, [10–8] in the final.

== Seeds ==
1. (India) Leander Paes / (Canada) Adil Shamasdin (champions)
2. (India) Purav Raja / (India) Divij Sharan (quarterfinals)
3. (Israel) Jonathan Erlich / (Austria) Philipp Oswald (first round)
4. (United States) Scott Lipsky / (New Zealand) Artem Sitak (first round)

== Draw ==
=== Key ===
- Q = Qualifier
- WC = Wild card
- LL = Lucky loser
- Alt = Alternate
- SE = Special exempt
- PR = Protected ranking
- ITF = ITF entry
- JE = Junior exempt
- w/o = Walkover
- r = Retired
- d = Defaulted
- SR = Special ranking

First round
1	(India) L Paes (Canada) A Shamasdin	4	6	[12]
(Australia) M Reid (Australia) J-P Smith	6	3	[10]
(Peru) S Galdós (India) J Nedunchezhiyan	6^{6}	6^{5}
(Chile) H Podlipnik-Castillo (Belarus) A Vasilevski	7^{8}	7^{7}
3	(Israel) J Erlich (Austria) P Oswald	4	5
WC	(United Kingdom) J Clarke (United Kingdom) M Willis	6	7
Alt	(Slovakia) N Gombos (Ukraine) I Marchenko	3	2
PR	(Australia) J Millman (Australia) L Saville	6	6
WC	(United Kingdom) B Klein (United Kingdom) J Salisbury	6	7^{7}
(United States) T Sandgren (Sweden) A Siljeström	4	6^{4}
(Australia) M Polmans (Australia) A Whittington	6	7^{12}
4	(United States) S Lipsky (New Zealand) A Sitak	3	6^{10}
WC	(United Kingdom) K Skupski (United Kingdom) N Skupski	7^{7}	3	[4]
(Thailand) Sa Ratiwatana (Thailand) So Ratiwatana	6^{5}	6	[10]
(Dominican Republic) V Estrella Burgos (Barbados) D King	2	4
2	(India) P Raja (India) D Sharan	6	6

Quarterfinals
1	(India) L Paes (Canada) A Shamasdin	7^{7}	6
(Chile) H Podlipnik-Castillo (Belarus) A Vasilevski	6^{1}	2
WC	(United Kingdom) J Clarke (United Kingdom) M Willis	3	7^{7}	[8]
PR	(Australia) J Millman (Australia) L Saville	6	6^{5}	[10]
WC	(United Kingdom) B Klein (United Kingdom) J Salisbury	6	7^{7}
(Australia) M Polmans (Australia) A Whittington	2	6^{3}
(Thailand) Sa Ratiwatana (Thailand) So Ratiwatana	6	6
2	(India) P Raja (India) D Sharan	2	4

Semifinals
1	(India) L Paes (Canada) A Shamasdin	6	7^{7}
PR	(Australia) J Millman (Australia) L Saville	4	6^{2}
WC	(United Kingdom) B Klein (United Kingdom) J Salisbury	6	3	[10]
(Thailand) Sa Ratiwatana (Thailand) So Ratiwatana	3	6	[6]

Final
1	(India) L Paes (Canada) A Shamasdin	6	2	[10]
WC	(United Kingdom) B Klein (United Kingdom) J Salisbury	2	6	[8]
