= 2023 Ilkley Trophy – Women's singles =

Women's singles
- 2023 Ilkley Trophy

Final
- Champion: (Sweden) Mirjam Björklund
- Runner-up: (United States) Emma Navarro
- Score: 6–4, 7–5

Events
Singles	men	women
Doubles	men	women
← 2022 ·	Ilkley Trophy	· 2024 →

Mirjam Björklund won the title, defeating Emma Navarro in the final, 6–4, 7–5.

Dalma Gálfi was the defending champion, but lost in the semifinals to Björklund.

== Seeds ==
1. (United States) Emma Navarro (final)
2. (Slovakia) Anna Karolína Schmiedlová (first round)
3. (Hungary) Dalma Gálfi (semifinals)
4. (Switzerland) Simona Waltert (first round)
5. (Spain) Aliona Bolsova (quarterfinals)
6. (United States) Kayla Day (withdrew)
7. (Japan) Nao Hibino (quarterfinals)
8. (Germany) Tamara Korpatsch (first round)

== Draw ==
=== Key ===
- Q = Qualifier
- WC = Wild card
- LL = Lucky loser
- Alt = Alternate
- SE = Special exempt
- PR = Protected ranking
- ITF = ITF entry
- JE = Junior exempt
- w/o = Walkover
- r = Retired
- d = Defaulted
- SR = Special ranking

=== Finals ===
Semifinals
1	(United States) Emma Navarro	6	6
WC	(United Kingdom) Sonay Kartal	2	1
3	(Hungary) Dalma Gálfi	6^{5}	6	3
(Sweden) Mirjam Björklund	7^{7}	2	6

Final
1	(United States) Emma Navarro	4	5
(Sweden) Mirjam Björklund	6	7

=== Top half ===
First round
1	(United States) E Navarro	6	6
(Canada) K Sebov	4	3
(Japan) H Sakatsume	7^{8}	7
Q	(Chinese Taipei) J Garland	6^{6}	5
Q	(Netherlands) A Hartono	3	6	6^{3}
SR	(Poland) M Chwalińska	6	1	7^{7}
(Greece) V Grammatikopoulou	5	1
7	(Japan) N Hibino	7	6
4	(Switzerland) S Waltert	1	0
WC	(United Kingdom) S Kartal	6	6
LL	(Australia) M Inglis	2	2
(France) E Jacquemot	6	6
WC	(United Kingdom) I Lacy	2	6	6
(Switzerland) V Golubic	6	4	3
WC	(United Kingdom) Y Miyazaki	7^{7}	4	1
5	(Spain) A Bolsova	6^{5}	6	6

Second round
1	(United States) E Navarro	6	6
(Japan) H Sakatsume	4	1
SR	(Poland) M Chwalińska	1	3
7	(Japan) N Hibino	6	6
WC	(United Kingdom) S Kartal	7	6
(France) E Jacquemot	5	1
WC	(United Kingdom) I Lacy	6	5	6^{3}
5	(Spain) A Bolsova	4	7	7^{7}

Quarterfinals
1	(United States) E Navarro	6	7
7	(Japan) N Hibino	1	5
WC	(United Kingdom) S Kartal	6	6
5	(Spain) A Bolsova	3	3

Semifinals
1	(United States) E Navarro	6	6
WC	(United Kingdom) S Kartal	2	1

=== Bottom half ===
First round
Q	(France) C Monnet	3	6	6
Q	(China) Z Bai	6	4	1
Q	(Netherlands) L Pattinama Kerkhove	4	5
Q	(Colombia) E Arango	6	7
Q	(United States) K Scott	7	3	6
WC	(United Kingdom) A Brogan	5	6	1
(Japan) M Uchijima	3	3
3	(Hungary) D Gálfi	6	6
8	(Germany) T Korpatsch	3	5
Q	(India) A Raina	6	7
(United States) A Li	2	2
(Sweden) M Björklund	6	6
(United States) S Vickery	6	6^{5}	6
(Australia) O Gadecki	3	7^{7}	0
(Ukraine) D Snigur	6	6
2	(Slovakia) AK Schmiedlová	3	1

Second round
Q	(France) C Monnet	0	1
Q	(Colombia) E Arango	6	6
Q	(United States) K Scott	3	6	4
3	(Hungary) D Gálfi	6	3	6
Q	(India) A Raina	2	1
(Sweden) M Björklund	6	6
(United States) S Vickery	2	4
(Ukraine) D Snigur	6	6

Quarterfinals
Q	(Colombia) E Arango	6	3	6^{5}
3	(Hungary) D Gálfi	2	6	7^{7}
(Sweden) M Björklund	4
(Ukraine) D Snigur	0^{r}

Semifinals
3	(Hungary) D Gálfi	6^{5}	6	3
(Sweden) M Björklund	7^{7}	2	6
