= 2016 Aegon Ilkley Trophy – Men's singles =

Men's singles
- 2016 Aegon Ilkley Trophy

Final
- Champion: (Chinese Taipei) Lu Yen-hsun
- Runner-up: (France) Vincent Millot
- Score: 7–6^{(7–4)}, 6–2

Events
| Singles | men | women |
| Doubles | men | women |
| ← 2015 · | Aegon Ilkley Trophy | · 2017 → |

Denis Kudla was the defending champion, but chose not to defend his title.

Lu Yen-hsun won the title after defeating Vincent Millot 7–6^{(7–4)}, 6–2 in the final.

== Seeds ==
1. (Australia) Jordan Thompson (quarterfinals)
2. (Chinese Taipei) Lu Yen-hsun (champion)
3. (United States) Bjorn Fratangelo (second round)
4. (Netherlands) Igor Sijsling (first round)
5. (United States) Tim Smyczek (second round)
6. (Bosnia and Herzegovina) Mirza Bašić (first round)
7. (Switzerland) Marco Chiudinelli (first round)
8. (United States) Austin Krajicek (first round)

== Draw ==
=== Key ===
- Q = Qualifier
- WC = Wild card
- LL = Lucky loser
- Alt = Alternate
- ITF = ITF entry
- PR = Protected ranking
- SR = Special ranking
- SE = Special exempt
- JE = Junior exempt
- JR = Junior Accelerator Programme entrant
- CO = College Accelerator Programme entrant
- NG = Next Gen Accelerator Program entrant
- w/o = Walkover
- r = Retired
- d = Defaulted

=== Finals ===
Semifinals
(France) Vincent Millot | 3 | 7^{8} | 6
WC | (United Kingdom) Brydan Klein | 6 | 6^{6} | 4
Q | (Poland) Michał Przysiężny | 6^{4} | 1
2 | (Chinese Taipei) Lu Yen-hsun | 7^{7} | 6

Final
(France) Vincent Millot | 6^{4} | 2
2 | (Chinese Taipei) Lu Yen-hsun | 7^{7} | 6

=== Top half ===
First round
1 | (Australia) J Thompson | 7^{7} | 6
WC | (United Kingdom) J O'Mara | 6^{5} | 2
(Colombia) A Falla | 6 | 7
Q | (Spain) A Menéndez-Maceiras | 2 | 5
(France) V Millot | 7 | 6
(Japan) G Soeda | 5 | 4
(United States) D Novikov | 6 | 6
8 | (United States) A Krajicek | 0 | 4
4 | (Netherlands) I Sijsling | 4 | 6^{5}
WC | (United Kingdom) B Klein | 6 | 7^{7}
WC | (United Kingdom) L Broady | 2 | 6 | 4
(Slovenia) G Žemlja | 6 | 3 | 6
(Estonia) J Zopp | 6^{4} | 3
Q | (Russia) D Medvedev | 7^{7} | 6
(United States) R Harrison | 6 | 7
6 | (Bosnia and Herzegovina) M Bašić | 4 | 5

Second round
1 | (Australia) J Thompson | 6 | 6
(Colombia) A Falla | 4 | 1
(France) V Millot | 6 | 6
(United States) D Novikov | 4 | 2
WC | (United Kingdom) B Klein | 6^{4} | 6 | 6
(Slovenia) G Žemlja | 7^{7} | 2 | 3
Q | (Russia) D Medvedev | 7^{7} | 4 | 4
(United States) R Harrison | 6^{4} | 6 | 6

Quarterfinals
1 | (Australia) J Thompson | 6 | 2 | 3
(France) V Millot | 4 | 6 | 6
WC | (United Kingdom) B Klein | 6 | 3 | 7
(United States) R Harrison | 4 | 6 | 5

Semifinals
(France) V Millot | 3 | 7^{8} | 6
WC | (United Kingdom) B Klein | 6 | 6^{6} | 4

=== Bottom half ===
First round
5 | (United States) T Smyczek | 6 | 6
(Australia) L Saville | 4 | 4
Q | (Australia) M Barton | 4 | 3
(France) Q Halys | 6 | 6
Q | (Poland) M Przysiężny | 6^{5} | 6 | 6
WC | (United Kingdom) L Glasspool | 7^{7} | 3 | 3
(Colombia) E Struvay | 5 | 1
3 | (United States) B Fratangelo | 7 | 6
7 | (Switzerland) M Chiudinelli | 4 | 4
(Croatia) F Škugor | 6 | 6
(China) D Wu | 3 | 1
(Argentina) R Olivo | 6 | 6
(Australia) J-P Smith | 6 | 6
(United States) A Sarkissian | 4 | 4
SE | (Romania) M Copil | 6^{4} | 7^{7} | 4
2 | (Chinese Taipei) Y-h Lu | 7^{7} | 6^{3} | 6

Second round
5 | (United States) T Smyczek | 6 | 3 | 5
(France) Q Halys | 2 | 6 | 7
Q | (Poland) M Przysiężny | 7^{8} | 6
3 | (United States) B Fratangelo | 6^{6} | 4
(Croatia) F Škugor | 6^{5} | 7^{7} | 1
(Argentina) R Olivo | 7^{7} | 6^{2} | 6
(Australia) J-P Smith | 3 | 7^{11} | 3
2 | (Chinese Taipei) Y-h Lu | 6 | 6^{9} | 6

Quarterfinals
(France) Q Halys | 3 | 6 | 2
Q | (Poland) M Przysiężny | 6 | 4 | 6
(Argentina) R Olivo | 2 | 4
2 | (Chinese Taipei) Y-h Lu | 6 | 6

Semifinals
Q | (Poland) M Przysiężny | 6^{4} | 1
2 | (Chinese Taipei) Y-h Lu | 7^{7} | 6
