= 2017 Aegon Ilkley Trophy – Women's singles =

Women's singles
- 2017 Aegon Ilkley Trophy

Final
- Champion: (Slovakia) Magdaléna Rybáriková
- Runner-up: (Belgium) Alison Van Uytvanck
- Score: 7–5, 7–6^{(7–3)}

Events
Singles	men	women
Doubles	men	women
← 2016 ·	Aegon Ilkley Trophy	· 2018 →

Evgeniya Rodina was the defending champion, but lost in the first round to Denisa Allertová.

Magdaléna Rybáriková won the title, defeating Alison Van Uytvanck in the final, 7–5, 7–6^{(7–3)}.

== Seeds ==
1. (France) Océane Dodin (first round)
2. (Switzerland) Viktorija Golubic (second round)
3. (Russia) Ekaterina Alexandrova (withdrew)
4. (Russia) Evgeniya Rodina (first round)
5. (United States) Madison Brengle (quarterfinals)
6. (Germany) Andrea Petkovic (semifinals)
7. (United States) Julia Boserup (first round)
8. (Japan) Kurumi Nara (first round)

== Draw ==
=== Key ===
- Q = Qualifier
- WC = Wild card
- LL = Lucky loser
- Alt = Alternate
- ITF = ITF entry
- PR = Protected ranking
- SR = Special ranking
- SE = Special exempt
- JE = Junior exempt
- JR = Junior Accelerator Programme entrant
- CO = College Accelerator Programme entrant
- NG = Next Gen Accelerator Program entrant
- w/o = Walkover
- r = Retired
- d = Defaulted

=== Finals ===
Semifinals
(Belgium) Alison Van Uytvanck	6	6
Q	(New Zealand) Marina Erakovic	4	2
6	(Germany) Andrea Petkovic	3	3
PR	(Slovakia) Magdaléna Rybáriková	6	6

Final
(Belgium) Alison Van Uytvanck	5	6^{3}
PR	(Slovakia) Magdaléna Rybáriková	7	7^{7}

=== Top half ===
First round
1	(France) O Dodin	6	4	6^{3}
SE	(Kazakhstan) Z Diyas	2	6	7^{7}
Q	(United States) C Dolehide	3	3
(Belgium) A Van Uytvanck	6	6
WC	(United Kingdom) H Dart	4	0
(Greece) M Sakkari	6	6
(Chinese Taipei) K-c Chang	4	6	6
7	(United States) J Boserup	6	0	2
4	(Russia) E Rodina	6^{4}	4
(Czech Republic) D Allertová	7^{7}	6
Q	(New Zealand) M Erakovic	6	7^{7}
(China) L Zhu	3	6^{3}
(Russia) A Blinkova	6	6^{5}	1
WC	(United Kingdom) L Robson	4	7^{7}	6
(Belgium) M Zanevska	6	6
8	(Japan) K Nara	2	2

Second round
SE	(Kazakhstan) Z Diyas	5	7^{7}	1
(Belgium) A Van Uytvanck	7	6^{4}	6
(Greece) M Sakkari	3	6	7^{7}
(Chinese Taipei) K-c Chang	6	3	6^{4}
(Czech Republic) D Allertová	2	4
Q	(New Zealand) M Erakovic	6	6
WC	(United Kingdom) L Robson	6	3	3
(Belgium) M Zanevska	3	6	6

Quarterfinals
(Belgium) A Van Uytvanck	6^{5}	6	3
(Greece) M Sakkari	7^{7}	4	0^{r}
Q	(New Zealand) M Erakovic	5	6	6
(Belgium) M Zanevska	7	3	4

Semifinals
(Belgium) A Van Uytvanck	6	6
Q	(New Zealand) M Erakovic	4	2

=== Bottom half ===
First round
6	(Germany) A Petkovic	6	6
WC	(United Kingdom) F Christie	3	2
Q	(United States) M Sanchez	7^{7}	6
(China) X Han	6^{3}	4
(Serbia) A Krunić	6	1	6^{6}
(Germany) T Maria	1	6	7^{8}
(Belarus) A Sabalenka	6	5	6^{2}
LL	(Italy) J Paolini	4	7	7^{7}
5	(United States) M Brengle	6	6
(South Korea) S-j Jang	4	3
(United States) A Muhammad	6	6
Q	(Russia) N Dzalamidze	2	2
PR	(Slovakia) M Rybáriková	6	2	6
WC	(United Kingdom) G Taylor	4	6	4
(Slovakia) K Kučová	5	6	4
2	(Switzerland) V Golubic	7	3	6

Second round
6	(Germany) A Petkovic	2	6	7^{7}
Q	(United States) M Sanchez	6	2	6^{4}
(Germany) T Maria	6	6
LL	(Italy) J Paolini	2	4
5	(United States) M Brengle	6	6
(United States) A Muhammad	4	3
PR	(Slovakia) M Rybáriková	6	6
2	(Switzerland) V Golubic	4	3

Quarterfinals
6	(Germany) A Petkovic	6	6
(Germany) T Maria	3	3
5	(United States) M Brengle	7^{7}	1	2
PR	(Slovakia) M Rybáriková	6^{2}	6	6

Semifinals
6	(Germany) A Petkovic	3	3
PR	(Slovakia) M Rybáriková	6	6
