= 2024 Ilkley Trophy – Men's singles =

Men's singles
- 2024 Ilkley Trophy

Final
- Champion: (Belgium) David Goffin
- Runner-up: (France) Harold Mayot
- Score: 6–4, 6–2

Events
Singles	men	women
Doubles	men	women
← 2023 ·	Ilkley Trophy	· 2025 →

Jason Kubler was the defending champion but chose not to defend his title.

David Goffin won the title after defeating Harold Mayot 6–4, 6–2 in the final.

== Seeds ==
1. (France) Hugo Gaston (first round)
2. (South Africa) Lloyd Harris (quarterfinals)
3. (France) Grégoire Barrère (second round)
4. (Belgium) David Goffin (champion)
5. (Chile) Cristian Garín (first round)
6. (France) Richard Gasquet (second round)
7. (United States) Zachary Svajda (semifinals)
8. (Italy) Stefano Napolitano (second round)

== Draw ==
=== Key ===
- Q = Qualifier
- WC = Wild card
- LL = Lucky loser
- Alt = Alternate
- ITF = ITF entry
- PR = Protected ranking
- SR = Special ranking
- SE = Special exempt
- JE = Junior exempt
- JR = Junior Accelerator Programme entrant
- CO = College Accelerator Programme entrant
- NG = Next Gen Accelerator Program entrant
- w/o = Walkover
- r = Retired
- d = Defaulted

=== Finals ===
Semifinals
7	(United States) Zachary Svajda	5	7^{7}	3
4	(Belgium) David Goffin	7	6^{3}	6
Q	(France) Benjamin Bonzi	6	3	2
(France) Harold Mayot	2	6	6

Final
4	(Belgium) David Goffin	6	6
(France) Harold Mayot	4	2

=== Top half ===
First round
1	(France) H Gaston	6^{4}	7^{7}	3
Q	(Chile) T Barrios Vera	7^{7}	6^{5}	6
WC	(United Kingdom) R Peniston	3	4
(Slovakia) L Klein	6	6
SE	(United Kingdom) C Broom	7^{7}	6
(Kazakhstan) M Kukushkin	6^{2}	1
Q	(United States) M Cressy	5	6^{3}
7	(United States) Z Svajda	7	7^{7}
4	(Belgium) D Goffin	7	6
(Austria) J Rodionov	5	3
WC	(United Kingdom) F Gill	3	7^{7}	1
(Switzerland) D Stricker	6	6^{3}	6
Q	(Kazakhstan) B Zhukayev	7^{7}	2	6^{5}
(Moldova) R Albot	6^{4}	6	7^{7}
(France) T Atmane	7^{7}	4	6
5	(Chile) C Garín	6^{4}	6	2

Second round
Q	(Chile) T Barrios Vera	6	6^{2}	4
(Slovakia) L Klein	2	7^{7}	6
SE	(United Kingdom) C Broom	6	3	2
7	(United States) Z Svajda	3	6	6
4	(Belgium) D Goffin	7^{7}	7^{7}
(Switzerland) D Stricker	6^{2}	6^{2}
(Moldova) R Albot	6^{4}	2
(France) T Atmane	7^{7}	6

Quarterfinals
(Slovakia) L Klein	4	6	1
7	(United States) Z Svajda	6	4	6
4	(Belgium) D Goffin	6	6
(France) T Atmane	3	4

Semifinals
7	(United States) Z Svajda	5	7^{7}	3
4	(Belgium) D Goffin	7	6^{3}	6

=== Bottom half ===
First round
8	(Italy) S Napolitano	6	6
(Hong Kong) C Wong	4	4
Q	(France) B Bonzi	7^{7}	7^{7}
Q	(United States) D Kudla	6^{5}	6^{5}
Q	(Canada) G Diallo	5	7	3
(France) T Droguet	7	5	6
(Portugal) H Rocha	7^{7}	3	2
3	(France) G Barrère	6^{2}	6	6
6	(France) R Gasquet	4	7^{7}	6
SE	(Italy) M Bellucci	6	6^{2}	4
(France) H Mayot	7	6
(United States) E Nava	5	4
WC	(United Kingdom) A Fery	6	7^{7}
(Croatia) D Ajduković	4	6^{2}
(Brazil) F Meligeni Alves	4	2
2	(South Africa) L Harris	6	6

Second round
8	(Italy) S Napolitano	1	4
Q	(France) B Bonzi	6	6
(France) T Droguet	7^{7}	6
3	(France) G Barrère	6^{2}	4
6	(France) R Gasquet	6^{3}	2
(France) H Mayot	7^{7}	6
WC	(United Kingdom) A Fery	4	6^{5}
2	(South Africa) L Harris	6	7^{7}

Quarterfinals
Q	(France) B Bonzi	7^{7}	6
(France) T Droguet	6^{5}	4
(France) H Mayot	6	6
2	(South Africa) L Harris	3	2

Semifinals
Q	(France) B Bonzi	6	3	2
(France) H Mayot	2	6	6
