= 2017 Aegon Ilkley Trophy – Women's doubles =

Women's doubles
- 2017 Aegon Ilkley Trophy

Final
- Champion: (Russia) Anna Blinkova (Russia) Alla Kudryavtseva
- Runner-up: (Poland) Paula Kania (Belgium) Maryna Zanevska
- Score: 6–1, 6–4

Events
Singles	men	women
Doubles	men	women
← 2016 ·	Aegon Ilkley Trophy	· 2018 →

Yang Zhaoxuan and Zhang Kailin were the defending champions, but both players chose not to participate.

Anna Blinkova and Alla Kudryavtseva won the title, defeating Paula Kania and Maryna Zanevska in the final 6–1, 6–4.

== Seeds ==
1. (Switzerland) Viktorija Golubic / (United States) Asia Muhammad (quarterfinals)
2. (Russia) Natela Dzalamidze / (Serbia) Aleksandra Krunić (first round)
3. (United Kingdom) Jocelyn Rae / (United States) Maria Sanchez (semifinals)
4. (China) Han Xinyun / (China) Zhu Lin (quarterfinals)

== Draw ==
=== Key ===
- Q = Qualifier
- WC = Wild card
- LL = Lucky loser
- Alt = Alternate
- SE = Special exempt
- PR = Protected ranking
- ITF = ITF entry
- JE = Junior exempt
- w/o = Walkover
- r = Retired
- d = Defaulted
- SR = Special ranking

First round
1	(Switzerland) V Golubic (United States) A Muhammad	6	3	[10]
(Australia) M Adamczak (Australia) S Sanders	3	6	[4]
(Croatia) P Martić (Germany) A Petkovic	6	6
(Netherlands) L Kerkhove (Belarus) L Marozava	3	4
4	(China) X Han (China) L Zhu	6	6
(United States) A Weinhold (United States) C Whoriskey	1	4
(United States) K Ahn (Australia) L Cabrera	2	4
(Russia) A Blinkova (Russia) A Kudryavtseva	6	6
(United Kingdom) S Anane (United Kingdom) N Hillyer	3	2
(Australia) Ar Rodionova (Russia) V Savinykh	6	6
(United Kingdom) A Pitak (United Kingdom) K Pitak	0	0
3	(United Kingdom) J Rae (United States) M Sanchez	6	6
(Greece) V Grammatikopoulou (Sweden) C Lister	6	6
(Chinese Taipei) K-c Chang (Japan) A Omae	4	4
(Poland) P Kania (Belgium) M Zanevska	3	6	[10]
2	(Russia) N Dzalamidze (Serbia) A Krunić	6	2	[8]

Quarterfinals
1	(Switzerland) V Golubic (United States) A Muhammad	2	1
(Croatia) P Martić (Germany) A Petkovic	6	6
4	(China) X Han (China) L Zhu	3	3
(Russia) A Blinkova (Russia) A Kudryavtseva	6	6
(Australia) Ar Rodionova (Russia) V Savinykh	4	4
3	(United Kingdom) J Rae (United States) M Sanchez	6	6
(Greece) V Grammatikopoulou (Sweden) C Lister	3	6^{5}
(Poland) P Kania (Belgium) M Zanevska	6	7^{7}

Semifinals
(Croatia) P Martić (Germany) A Petkovic	6^{4}	4
(Russia) A Blinkova (Russia) A Kudryavtseva	7^{7}	6
3	(United Kingdom) J Rae (United States) M Sanchez	3	3
(Poland) P Kania (Belgium) M Zanevska	6	6

Final
(Russia) A Blinkova (Russia) A Kudryavtseva	6	6
(Poland) P Kania (Belgium) M Zanevska	1	4
