= 2016 Aegon Ilkley Trophy – Men's doubles =

Defending champions

Men's doubles
- 2016 Aegon Ilkley Trophy

Final
- Champions: (Netherlands) Wesley Koolhof (Netherlands) Matwé Middelkoop
- Runners-up: (Brazil) Marcelo Demoliner (Pakistan) Aisam-ul-Haq Qureshi
- Score: 7–6^{(7–5)}, 0–6, [10–8]

Events
| Singles | men | women |
| Doubles | men | women |
| ← 2015 · | Aegon Ilkley Trophy | · 2017 → |

Marcus Daniell and Marcelo Demoliner were the defending champions, but played with different partners. Daniell partnered Dennis Novikov while Demoliner played with Aisam-ul-Haq Qureshi. Daniell lost in the first round to Johan Brunström and Andreas Siljeström. Demoliner also failed to defend his title, losing in the final to Wesley Koolhof and Matwé Middelkoop 7–6^{(7–5)}, 0–6, [10–8].

== Seeds ==
1. (Netherlands) Wesley Koolhof / (Netherlands) Matwé Middelkoop (champions)
2. (Brazil) Marcelo Demoliner / (Pakistan) Aisam-ul-Haq Qureshi (final)
3. (Sweden) Johan Brunström / (Sweden) Andreas Siljeström (semifinals)
4. (United Kingdom) Jonathan Marray / (Canada) Adil Shamasdin (quarterfinals)

== Draw ==
=== Key ===
- Q = Qualifier
- WC = Wild card
- LL = Lucky loser
- Alt = Alternate
- SE = Special exempt
- PR = Protected ranking
- ITF = ITF entry
- JE = Junior exempt
- w/o = Walkover
- r = Retired
- d = Defaulted
- SR = Special ranking

First round
1 | (Netherlands) W Koolhof (Netherlands) M Middelkoop | 4 | 7^{7} | [10]
(Peru) S Galdós (India) J Nedunchezhiyan | 6 | 6^{3} | [5]
(Thailand) Sa Ratiwatana (Thailand) So Ratiwatana | 7 | 6
(China) Y Bai (Italy) R Ghedin | 5 | 4
4 | (United Kingdom) J Marray (Canada) A Shamasdin | 7^{7} | 7^{7}
(Switzerland) M Chiudinelli (Croatia) F Škugor | 6^{1} | 6^{2}
WC | (United Kingdom) L Glasspool (United Kingdom) B Klein | 6^{5} | 7^{7} | [10]
WC | (United Kingdom) L Broady (United Kingdom) D Walsh | 7^{7} | 6^{3} | [4]
(Belgium) R Bemelmans (Australia) R Junaid | 4 | 6 | [6]
(United States) R Harrison (United States) A Krajicek | 6 | 3 | [10]
(New Zealand) M Daniell (United States) D Novikov | 6^{5} | 6^{1}
3 | (Sweden) J Brunström (Sweden) A Siljeström | 7^{7} | 7^{7}
(India) P Raja (India) D Sharan | 6 | 6
(Bosnia and Herzegovina) M Bašić (Chinese Taipei) C-p Hsieh | 1 | 3
(Netherlands) S Arends (Austria) T-S Weissborn | 6^{5} | 4
2 | (Brazil) M Demoliner (Pakistan) A-u-H Qureshi | 7^{7} | 6

Quarterfinals
1 | (Netherlands) W Koolhof (Netherlands) M Middelkoop | 6 | 6
(Thailand) Sa Ratiwatana (Thailand) So Ratiwatana | 3 | 4
4 | (United Kingdom) J Marray (Canada) A Shamasdin | 7 | 4 | [8]
WC | (United Kingdom) L Glasspool (United Kingdom) B Klein | 5 | 6 | [10]
(United States) R Harrison (United States) A Krajicek | 7^{7} | 6^{3} | [7]
3 | (Sweden) J Brunström (Sweden) A Siljeström | 6^{5} | 7^{7} | [10]
(India) P Raja (India) D Sharan | 5 | 4
2 | (Brazil) M Demoliner (Pakistan) A-u-H Qureshi | 7 | 6

Semifinals
1 | (Netherlands) W Koolhof (Netherlands) M Middelkoop | 6 | 6^{5} | [10]
WC | (United Kingdom) L Glasspool (United Kingdom) B Klein | 3 | 7^{7} | [2]
3 | (Sweden) J Brunström (Sweden) A Siljeström | 3 | 6^{3}
2 | (Brazil) M Demoliner (Pakistan) A-u-H Qureshi | 6 | 7^{7}

Final
1 | (Netherlands) W Koolhof (Netherlands) M Middelkoop | 7^{7} | 0 | [10]
2 | (Brazil) M Demoliner (Pakistan) A-u-H Qureshi | 6^{5} | 6 | [8]
