= 2024 Ilkley Trophy – Men's doubles =

Men's doubles
- 2024 Ilkley Trophy

Final
- Champions: (United States) Evan King (United States) Reese Stalder
- Runners-up: (United States) Christian Harrison (France) Fabrice Martin
- Score: 6–3, 3–6, [10–6]

Events
Singles	men	women
Doubles	men	women
- Ilkley Trophy

Gonzalo Escobar and Aleksandr Nedovyesov were the defending champions but chose not to defend their title.

Evan King and Reese Stalder won the title after defeating Christian Harrison and Fabrice Martin 6–3, 3–6, [10–6] in the final.

== Seeds ==
1. (Colombia) Nicolás Barrientos / (Portugal) Francisco Cabral (semifinals)
2. (India) Sriram Balaji / (United Kingdom) Luke Johnson (quarterfinals)
3. (France) Grégoire Jacq / (Tunisia) Skander Mansouri (first round)
4. (United States) Evan King / (United States) Reese Stalder (champions)

== Draw ==
Key

- Q = Qualifier
- WC = Wild card
- LL = Lucky loser
- Alt = Alternate
- ITF = ITF entry
- PR = Protected ranking
- SR = Special ranking
- SE = Special exempt
- JE = Junior exempt
- JR = Junior Accelerator Programme entrant
- CO = College Accelerator Programme entrant
- NG = Next Gen Accelerator Program entrant
- w/o = Walkover
- r = Retired
- d = Defaulted

=== Draw ===
First round
1	(Colombia) N Barrientos (Portugal) F Cabral	6^{2}	6	[10]
(India) RC Bollipalli (India) N Kaliyanda Poonacha	7^{7}	3	[8]
(Australia) T Schoolkate (Australia) J-P Smith	6	6
WC	(United Kingdom) J Clarke (United Kingdom) M Willis	4	4
4	(United States) E King (United States) R Stalder	7	6
(Chile) T Barrios Vera (Chile) C Garín	5	3
(India) A Chandrasekar (India) A Kadhe	4	6^{6}
(Sweden) A Göransson (Netherlands) S Verbeek	6	7^{8}
(Netherlands) S Arends (Netherlands) D Pel	6	3	[10]
(France) T Arribagé (France) M Martineau	4	6	[6]
(United States) C Harrison (France) F Martin	6	6^{5}	[10]
3	(France) G Jacq (Tunisia) S Mansouri	3	7^{7}	[8]
PR	(New Zealand) M Daniell (Netherlands) M Middelkoop	6	6
Alt	(United Kingdom) J Paris (United Kingdom) R Peniston	4	4
(India) J Nedunchezhiyan (India) VS Prashanth	3	5
2	(India) S Balaji (United Kingdom) L Johnson	6	7

Quarterfinals
1	(Colombia) N Barrientos (Portugal) F Cabral	7^{7}	6^{5}	[13]
(Australia) T Schoolkate (Australia) J-P Smith	6^{5}	7^{7}	[11]
4	(United States) E King (United States) R Stalder	7^{7}	6
(Sweden) A Göransson (Netherlands) S Verbeek	6^{1}	2
(Netherlands) S Arends (Netherlands) D Pel	5	3
(United States) C Harrison (France) F Martin	7	6
PR	(New Zealand) M Daniell (Netherlands) M Middelkoop	7^{7}	6
2	(India) S Balaji (United Kingdom) L Johnson	6^{3}	4

Semifinals
1	(Colombia) N Barrientos (Portugal) F Cabral	6^{4}	4
4	(United States) E King (United States) R Stalder	7^{7}	6
(United States) C Harrison (France) F Martin	3	6	[11]
PR	(New Zealand) M Daniell (Netherlands) M Middelkoop	6	2	[9]

Final
4	(United States) E King (United States) R Stalder	6	3	[10]
(United States) C Harrison (France) F Martin	3	6	[6]
