= Brooke Black =

British tennis player (born 2007)

- Country (sports): United Kingdom
- Born: 20 November 2007 (age 18) London, England, UK
- Prize money: $21,788

Singles
- Career record: 32–41
- Highest ranking: No. 708 (3 November 2025)
- Current ranking: No. 806 (29 June 2026)

Doubles
- Career record: 26–25
- Career titles: 2 ITF
- Highest ranking: No. 432 (24 August 2026)
- Current ranking: No. 437 (31 August 2026)
- Last updated on: 9 September 2026.

Brooke Anna Black (born 20 November 2007) is a British tennis player. She has a career-high doubles ranking by the WTA of No. 432, achieved on 24 August 2026.

== Early life and education ==
Black was born in London and comes from a family of tennis players. She is the daughter of Wayne Black and Irina Selyutina, the niece of Byron Black and Cara Black, and granddaughter of Don Black.

Black was educated at Teddington School. In 2026 she enrolled at the University of Florida.

== Career ==
In October 2025, Black and playing partner Reina Gotō won the doubles championship title at the W35 Darwin tennis tournament in Australia, part of the 2025 ITF World Tour, defeating Australian pairing Elicia Kim and Jizelle Sibai in straight sets.

In July 2026, playing on the ITF Tennis Tour, she reached the ladies doubles final at the W50 Nottingham tournament alongside Angella Okutoyi; they won via walkover from Victoria Allen and Amelia Rajecki.

== Personal ==
Black speaks Russian in addition to English.

== ITF Circuit finals ==
=== Doubles: 5 (2 titles, 3 runner-ups) ===
Legend W50 tournaments (1–0) W35 tournaments (1–3)	Finals by surface Hard (2–3)

Result	W–L	Date	Tournament	Tier	Surface	Partner	Opponents	Score
Loss	0–1	May 2025	ITF Nottingham, United Kingdom	W35	Hard	(United Kingdom) Daniela Piani	(United Kingdom) Naiktha Bains (United Kingdom) Holly Hutchinson	3–6, 3–6
Loss	0–2	Sep 2025	Darwin International, Australia	W35	Hard	(Japan) Reina Goto	(New Zealand) Monique Barry (Australia) Gabriella Da Silva-Fick	3–6, 6–7^{(7)}
Win	1–2	Oct 2025	Darwin International, Australia	W35	Hard	(Japan) Reina Goto	(Australia) Elicia Kim (Australia) Jizelle Sibai	6–3, 6–2
Win	2–2	Jul 2026	ITF Nottingham, United Kingdom	W50	Hard	(Kenya) Angella Okutoyi	(United Kingdom) Victoria Allen (United Kingdom) Amelia Rajecki	walkover
Loss	2–3	Aug 2026	ITF Roehampton, United Kingdom	W35	Hard	(Kenya) Angella Okutoyi	(United Kingdom) Emily Appleton (United Kingdom) Ella McDonald	5–7, 6–7^{(2)}
