= 2016 Aegon Ilkley Trophy – Women's doubles =

Women's doubles
- 2016 Aegon Ilkley Trophy

Final
- Champions: (China) Yang Zhaoxuan (China) Zhang Kailin
- Runners-up: (Belgium) An-Sophie Mestach (Australia) Storm Sanders
- Score: 6–3, 7–6^{(7–5)}

Events
Singles	men	women
Doubles	men	women
← 2015 ·	Aegon Ilkley Trophy	· 2017 →

Raluca Olaru and Xu Yifan were the defending champions, but both players chose not to participate.

Yang Zhaoxuan and Zhang Kailin won the title, defeating An-Sophie Mestach and Storm Sanders in the final, 6–3, 7–6^{(7–5)}.

== Seeds ==
1. (China) Han Xinyun / (China) Wang Yafan (semifinals)
2. (United Kingdom) Jocelyn Rae / (United Kingdom) Anna Smith (quarterfinals)
3. (Japan) Shuko Aoyama / (Japan) Makoto Ninomiya (first round)
4. (China) Yang Zhaoxuan / (China) Zhang Kailin (champions)

== Draw ==
=== Key ===
- Q = Qualifier
- WC = Wild card
- LL = Lucky loser
- Alt = Alternate
- SE = Special exempt
- PR = Protected ranking
- ITF = ITF entry
- JE = Junior exempt
- w/o = Walkover
- r = Retired
- d = Defaulted
- SR = Special ranking

First round
1	(China) X Han (China) Y Wang	7	6
(France) S Foretz (France) A Hesse	5	4
WC	(United Kingdom) A Gibson (United Kingdom) SB Grey	6	1	[4]
(Croatia) P Martić (United States) M Sanchez	3	6	[10]
4	(China) Z Yang (China) K Zhang	7^{7}	6
WC	(United Kingdom) E Appleton (Australia) J Fourlis	6^{2}	3
(Netherlands) R Hogenkamp (Netherlands) L Kerkhove	6^{5}	4
(Japan) H Kuwata (United States) J Pegula	7^{7}	6
(United States) S Marand (United States) M Oudin	4	6	[6]
(Netherlands) C Burger (Argentina) C Pella	6	1	[10]
(Russia) I Khromacheva (Ukraine) M Zanevska	7	6
3	(Japan) S Aoyama (Japan) M Ninomiya	5	4
(Belgium) A-S Mestach (Australia) S Sanders	6	6
(Poland) P Kania (Russia) E Rodina	4	4
(United States) N Melichar (China) L Zhu	4	4
2	(United Kingdom) J Rae (United Kingdom) A Smith	6	6

Quarterfinals
1	(China) X Han (China) Y Wang	6	6
(Croatia) P Martić (United States) M Sanchez	2	3
4	(China) Z Yang (China) K Zhang	6	6
(Japan) H Kuwata (United States) J Pegula	2	4
(Netherlands) C Burger (Argentina) C Pella	4	4
(Russia) I Khromacheva (Ukraine) M Zanevska	6	6
(Belgium) A-S Mestach (Australia) S Sanders	5	6	[10]
2	(United Kingdom) J Rae (United Kingdom) A Smith	7	4	[5]

Semifinals
1	(China) X Han (China) Y Wang	6	4	[8]
4	(China) Z Yang (China) K Zhang	1	6	[10]
(Russia) I Khromacheva (Ukraine) M Zanevska	3^{r}
(Belgium) A-S Mestach (Australia) S Sanders	4

Final
4	(China) Z Yang (China) K Zhang	6	7^{7}
(Belgium) A-S Mestach (Australia) S Sanders	3	6^{5}
