= 2016 Aegon Ilkley Trophy – Women's singles =

Women's singles
- 2016 Aegon Ilkley Trophy

Final
- Champion: (Russia) Evgeniya Rodina
- Runner-up: (Slovakia) Rebecca Šramková
- Score: 6–4, 6–4

Events
Singles	men	women
Doubles	men	women
← 2015 ·	Aegon Ilkley Trophy	· 2017 →

Anna-Lena Friedsam was the defending champion but chose to participate in Mallorca instead.

Evgeniya Rodina won the title, defeating Rebecca Šramková in the final, 6–4, 6–4.

== Seeds ==
1. (China) Zhang Kailin (second round)
2. (Russia) Evgeniya Rodina (champion)
3. (Russia) Irina Khromacheva (first round)
4. (China) Han Xinyun (first round)
5. (China) Duan Yingying (quarterfinals)
6. (Netherlands) Richèl Hogenkamp (quarterfinals)
7. (Ukraine) Maryna Zanevska (second round)
8. (Serbia) Ivana Jorović (second round)

== Main draw ==
=== Key ===
- Q = Qualifier
- WC = Wild card
- LL = Lucky loser
- Alt = Alternate
- ITF = ITF entry
- PR = Protected ranking
- SR = Special ranking
- SE = Special exempt
- JE = Junior exempt
- JR = Junior Accelerator Programme entrant
- CO = College Accelerator Programme entrant
- NG = Next Gen Accelerator Program entrant
- w/o = Walkover
- r = Retired
- d = Defaulted

=== Finals ===
Semifinals
PR	(Portugal) Michelle Larcher de Brito	6^{3}	6^{7}
Q	(Slovakia) Rebecca Šramková	7^{7}	7^{9}
(Japan) Mayo Hibi	5	1
2	(Russia) Evgeniya Rodina	7	6

Final
Q	(Slovakia) Rebecca Šramková	4	4
2	(Russia) Evgeniya Rodina	6	6

=== Top half ===
First round
1	(China) K Zhang	7^{7}	7
(United States) J Pegula	6^{4}	5
PR	(Portugal) M Larcher de Brito	1	6	6
(Thailand) L Kumkhum	6	4	4
(Croatia) P Martić	4	7^{7}	6
SE	(France) S Foretz	6	6^{4}	3
WC	(United Kingdom) F Christie	4	5
5	(China) Y Duan	6	7
4	(China) X Han	1	6	2
(Chinese Taipei) K-c Chang	6	4	6
Q	(Tunisia) O Jabeur	6	6
(Poland) P Kania	4	1
Q	(Slovakia) R Šramková	6	5	7
(China) Y Wang	4	7	5
(Japan) H Kuwata	6	4	3
7	(Ukraine) M Zanevska	2	6	6

Second round
1	(China) K Zhang	6	3	3
PR	(Portugal) M Larcher de Brito	1	6	6
(Croatia) P Martić	3	5
5	(China) Y Duan	6	7
(Chinese Taipei) K-c Chang	7^{7}	6
Q	(Tunisia) O Jabeur	6^{0}	4
Q	(Slovakia) R Šramková	4	7^{7}	6
7	(Ukraine) M Zanevska	6	6^{5}	4

Quarterfinals
PR	(Portugal) M Larcher de Brito	6	6
5	(China) Y Duan	1	2
(Chinese Taipei) K-c Chang	4	1
Q	(Slovakia) R Šramková	6	6

Semifinals
PR	(Portugal) M Larcher de Brito	6^{3}	6^{7}
Q	(Slovakia) R Šramková	7^{7}	7^{9}

=== Bottom half ===
First round
8	(Serbia) I Jorović	7	6
Q	(United States) S Marand	5	2
(Japan) M Hibi	6	6
PR	(Croatia) T Mrdeža	0	2
Q	(Australia) J Fourlis	3	2
(France) A Hesse	6	6
(China) L Zhu	0	6	7^{7}
3	(Russia) I Khromacheva	6	4	6^{2}
6	(Netherlands) R Hogenkamp	6	5	6
(Belgium) A-S Mestach	1	7	3
WC	(United Kingdom) E Appleton	6	3	2
(Netherlands) C Burger	2	6	6
(Netherlands) L Kerkhove	7	3	5
WC	(United Kingdom) S Murray	5	6	7
LL	(Australia) A Bai	3	2
2	(Russia) E Rodina	6	6

Second round
8	(Serbia) I Jorović	1	4
(Japan) M Hibi	6	6
(France) A Hesse	6	6
(China) L Zhu	2	2
6	(Netherlands) R Hogenkamp	4	6	6
(Netherlands) C Burger	6	4	3
WC	(United Kingdom) S Murray	4	3
2	(Russia) E Rodina	6	6

Quarterfinals
(Japan) M Hibi	1	6	6
(France) A Hesse	6	3	2
6	(Netherlands) R Hogenkamp	0	2
2	(Russia) E Rodina	6	6

Semifinals
(Japan) M Hibi	5	1
2	(Russia) E Rodina	7	6
