= 2023 Ilkley Trophy – Men's singles =

Men's singles
- 2023 Ilkley Trophy

Final
- Champion: (Australia) Jason Kubler
- Runner-up: (Austria) Sebastian Ofner
- Score: 6–4, 6–4

Events
Singles	men	women
Doubles	men	women
← 2022 ·	Ilkley Trophy	· 2024 →

Zizou Bergs was the defending champion but lost in the second round to Denis Kudla.

Jason Kubler won the title after defeating Sebastian Ofner 6–4, 6–4 in the final.

== Seeds ==
1. (Portugal) Nuno Borges (first round)
2. (Slovakia) Alex Molčan (withdrew)
3. (Austria) Sebastian Ofner (final)
4. (Australia) Jason Kubler (champion)
5. (Austria) Jurij Rodionov (first round)
6. (Switzerland) Dominic Stricker (first round, retired)
7. (United States) Aleksandar Kovacevic (first round)
8. (Japan) Yosuke Watanuki (first round)

== Draw ==
=== Key ===
- Q = Qualifier
- WC = Wild card
- LL = Lucky loser
- Alt = Alternate
- ITF = ITF entry
- PR = Protected ranking
- SR = Special ranking
- SE = Special exempt
- JE = Junior exempt
- JR = Junior Accelerator Programme entrant
- CO = College Accelerator Programme entrant
- NG = Next Gen Accelerator Program entrant
- w/o = Walkover
- r = Retired
- d = Defaulted

=== Finals ===
Semifinals
SE	(France) Arthur Cazaux	6	3	1
4	(Australia) Jason Kubler	4	6	6
3	(Austria) Sebastian Ofner	6	6
(Hungary) Zsombor Piros	3	0

Final
4	(Australia) Jason Kubler	6	6
3	(Austria) Sebastian Ofner	4	4

=== Top half ===
First round
1	(Portugal) N Borges	6	3	4
(Argentina) TA Tirante	4	6	6
(Canada) G Diallo	3	6^{1}
SE	(France) A Cazaux	6	7^{7}
LL	(Japan) S Shimabukuro	6	6^{2}	6
WC	(United Kingdom) H Wendelken	2	7^{7}	2
(Australia) R Hijikata	7^{10}	7
8	(Japan) Y Watanuki	6^{8}	5
4	(Australia) J Kubler	6	6^{3}	6
SE	(Switzerland) A Ritschard	3	7^{7}	3
Q	(Italy) M Bellucci	4	6	6
(Slovakia) L Klein	6	4	4
(Ecuador) E Gómez	3	6^{2}
Q	(China) J Shang	6	7^{7}
(Belgium) D Goffin	7	1
6	(Switzerland) D Stricker	5	3^{r}

Second round
(Argentina) TA Tirante	1	1^{r}
SE	(France) A Cazaux	6	3
LL	(Japan) S Shimabukuro	3	6	6
(Australia) R Hijikata	6	4	3
4	(Australia) J Kubler	4	6	6
Q	(Italy) M Bellucci	6	3	4
Q	(China) J Shang	6	6^{1}	6
(Belgium) D Goffin	1	7^{7}	4

Quarterfinals
SE	(France) A Cazaux	6	1
LL	(Japan) S Shimabukuro	1	0^{r}
4	(Australia) J Kubler	6	6
Q	(China) J Shang	3	4

Semifinals
SE	(France) A Cazaux	6	3	1
4	(Australia) J Kubler	4	6	6

=== Bottom half ===
First round
5	(Austria) J Rodionov	6^{1}	6	1
(Belgium) Z Bergs	7^{7}	4	6
(United States) D Kudla	6	7^{7}
Q	(Serbia) H Međedović	3	6^{5}
(Finland) O Virtanen	7^{7}	7
(Slovakia) N Gombos	6^{2}	5
Q	(France) L Lokoli	3	2
3	(Austria) S Ofner	6	6
7	(United States) A Kovacevic	7^{11}	3	6^{7}
(Hungary) Z Piros	6^{9}	6	7^{9}
WC	(United Kingdom) T Samuel	6	6^{6}	5
Q	(Australia) A Bolt	2	7^{8}	7
(Italy) R Brancaccio	6	6
WC	(United Kingdom) J Monday	3	3
(Netherlands) G Brouwer	6^{5}	2
Q	(United Kingdom) C Broom	7^{7}	6

Second round
(Belgium) Z Bergs	2	5
(United States) D Kudla	6	7
(Finland) O Virtanen	4	6	4
3	(Austria) S Ofner	6	1	6
(Hungary) Z Piros	6	1	6
Q	(Australia) A Bolt	4	6	3
(Italy) R Brancaccio	1	4
Q	(United Kingdom) C Broom	6	6

Quarterfinals
(United States) D Kudla	2	2
3	(Austria) S Ofner	6	6
(Hungary) Z Piros	6^{3}	6	7^{7}
Q	(United Kingdom) C Broom	7^{7}	3	6^{2}

Semifinals
3	(Austria) S Ofner	6	6
(Hungary) Z Piros	3	0
