= 2017 Aegon Ilkley Trophy – Men's singles =

Men's singles
- 2017 Aegon Ilkley Trophy

Final
- Champion: (Hungary) Márton Fucsovics
- Runner-up: (Australia) Alex Bolt
- Score: 6–1, 6–4

Events
Singles	men	women
Doubles	men	women
← 2016 ·	Aegon Ilkley Trophy	· 2018 →

Lu Yen-hsun was the defending champion, but chose not to defend his title.

Márton Fucsovics won the title after defeating Alex Bolt 6–1, 6–4 in the final.

== Seeds ==
1. (Dominican Republic) Víctor Estrella Burgos (first round)
2. (Slovakia) Norbert Gombos (second round)
3. (Russia) Evgeny Donskoy (semifinals)
4. (United States) Tennys Sandgren (first round)
5. (Japan) Go Soeda (first round)
6. (Barbados) Darian King (first round)
7. (Russia) Konstantin Kravchuk (second round)
8. (Ukraine) Illya Marchenko (second round)

== Draw ==
=== Key ===
- Q = Qualifier
- WC = Wild card
- LL = Lucky loser
- Alt = Alternate
- ITF = ITF entry
- PR = Protected ranking
- SR = Special ranking
- SE = Special exempt
- JE = Junior exempt
- JR = Junior Accelerator Programme entrant
- CO = College Accelerator Programme entrant
- NG = Next Gen Accelerator Program entrant
- w/o = Walkover
- r = Retired
- d = Defaulted

=== Finals ===
Semifinals
(Hungary) Márton Fucsovics	7	7^{7}
3	(Russia) Evgeny Donskoy	5	6^{3}
SE	(Australia) Sam Groth	4	4
Q	(Australia) Alex Bolt	6	6

Final
(Hungary) Márton Fucsovics	6	6
Q	(Australia) Alex Bolt	1	4

=== Top half ===
First round
1	(Dominican Republic) V Estrella Burgos	6	4	0
(Hungary) M Fucsovics	4	6	6
(Australia) J Millman	7^{7}	6
(Austria) J Melzer	6^{3}	4
Q	(Australia) A De Minaur	3	6^{0}
WC	(United Kingdom) J Clarke	6	7^{7}
(France) P-H Mathieu	2	0^{r}
8	(Ukraine) I Marchenko	6	1
3	(Russia) E Donskoy	6^{4}	6	7
(Germany) P Gojowczyk	7^{7}	4	5
(Argentina) M Trungelliti	6^{3}	6	6
WC	(United Kingdom) L Glasspool	7^{7}	4	2
PR	(India) Y Bhambri	6^{4}	7^{9}	6
(Canada) P Polansky	7^{7}	6^{7}	3
(United States) T Fritz	6	6
5	(Japan) G Soeda	3	4

Second round
(Hungary) M Fucsovics	6	2	6
(Australia) J Millman	3	6	2
WC	(United Kingdom) J Clarke	6	7^{8}
8	(Ukraine) I Marchenko	4	6^{6}
3	(Russia) E Donskoy	4	7^{7}	6
(Argentina) M Trungelliti	6	6^{1}	3
PR	(India) Y Bhambri	6	6^{3}	3
(United States) T Fritz	1	7^{7}	6

Quarterfinals
(Hungary) M Fucsovics	6	6
WC	(United Kingdom) J Clarke	3	4
3	(Russia) E Donskoy	7^{7}	6
(United States) T Fritz	6^{3}	4

Semifinals
(Hungary) M Fucsovics	7	7^{7}
3	(Russia) E Donskoy	5	6^{3}

=== Bottom half ===
First round
6	(Barbados) D King	5	4
SE	(Australia) S Groth	7	6
WC	(United Kingdom) M Willis	1	7^{7}	6
Q	(Australia) M Ebden	6	6^{5}	4
(Bosnia and Herzegovina) M Bašić	4	6^{2}
(France) V Millot	6	7^{7}
(United States) B Fratangelo	6	7
4	(United States) T Sandgren	1	5
7	(Russia) K Kravchuk	2	7^{7}	7^{7}
(Spain) A Menéndez-Maceiras	6	6^{4}	6^{3}
Q	(United States) D Novikov	6	6^{5}	4
(France) Q Halys	4	7^{7}	6
SE	(Italy) G Quinzi	1	4
Q	(Australia) A Bolt	6	6
WC	(United Kingdom) B Klein	6	6^{5}	4
2	(Slovakia) N Gombos	1	7^{7}	6

Second round
SE	(Australia) S Groth	5	7^{7}	6
WC	(United Kingdom) M Willis	7	6^{2}	3
(France) V Millot	1	3
(United States) B Fratangelo	6	6
7	(Russia) K Kravchuk	7^{7}	6^{4}	6^{3}
(France) Q Halys	6^{4}	7^{7}	7^{7}
Q	(Australia) A Bolt	6	7^{7}
2	(Slovakia) N Gombos	4	6^{5}

Quarterfinals
SE	(Australia) S Groth	7^{7}	6
(United States) B Fratangelo	6^{5}	4
(France) Q Halys	4	2
Q	(Australia) A Bolt	6	6

Semifinals
SE	(Australia) S Groth	4	4
Q	(Australia) A Bolt	6	6
