= 2023 Ilkley Trophy – Men's doubles =

Men's doubles
- 2023 Ilkley Trophy

Final
- Champions: (Ecuador) Gonzalo Escobar (Kazakhstan) Aleksandr Nedovyesov
- Runners-up: (United States) Robert Galloway (Australia) John-Patrick Smith
- Score: 2–6, 7–5, [11–9]

Events
Singles	men	women
Doubles	men	women
- Ilkley Trophy

Julian Cash and Henry Patten were the defending champions but chose not to defend their title.

Gonzalo Escobar and Aleksandr Nedovyesov won the title after defeating Robert Galloway and John-Patrick Smith 2–6, 7–5, [11–9] in the final.

== Seeds ==
1. (Ecuador) Gonzalo Escobar / (Kazakhstan) Aleksandr Nedovyesov (champions)
2. (Portugal) Francisco Cabral / (Netherlands) Bart Stevens (first round)
3. (United States) Robert Galloway / (Australia) John-Patrick Smith (final)
4. (Netherlands) Sander Arends / (Netherlands) David Pel (quarterfinals)

== Draw ==
Key

- Q = Qualifier
- WC = Wild card
- LL = Lucky loser
- Alt = Alternate
- ITF = ITF entry
- PR = Protected ranking
- SR = Special ranking
- SE = Special exempt
- JE = Junior exempt
- JR = Junior Accelerator Programme entrant
- CO = College Accelerator Programme entrant
- NG = Next Gen Accelerator Program entrant
- w/o = Walkover
- r = Retired
- d = Defaulted

First round
1	(Ecuador) G Escobar (Kazakhstan) A Nedovyesov	6	6
(Australia) A Harris (Australia) L Saville	2	4
WC	(United Kingdom) T Samuel (United Kingdom) C Thomson	3	6^{4}
(Germany) C Frantzen (Germany) H Jebens	6	7^{7}
4	(Netherlands) S Arends (Netherlands) D Pel	6	6
(India) P Raja (India) D Sharan	3	3
(Belgium) R Collignon (Belgium) G Onclin	6	5	[5]
(Belgium) Z Bergs (Belgium) J De Loore	3	7	[10]
WC	(United Kingdom) J Fearnley (United Kingdom) J Monday	6	5	[4]
(Netherlands) G Brouwer (Netherlands) J de Jong	3	7	[10]
(Canada) G Diallo (United States) A Kovacevic	4	4
3	(United States) R Galloway (Australia) J-P Smith	6	6
(India) A Chandrasekar (India) VS Prashanth	w/o
(Italy) F Agamenone (Argentina) TA Tirante
(India) S Balaji (Pakistan) A-u-H Qureshi	6	7^{7}
2	(Portugal) F Cabral (Netherlands) B Stevens	3	6^{4}

Quarterfinals
1	(Ecuador) G Escobar (Kazakhstan) A Nedovyesov	6	3	[10]
(Germany) C Frantzen (Germany) H Jebens	4	6	[4]
4	(Netherlands) S Arends (Netherlands) D Pel	6	5	[9]
(Belgium) Z Bergs (Belgium) J De Loore	3	7	[11]
(Netherlands) G Brouwer (Netherlands) J de Jong	3	6^{1}
3	(United States) R Galloway (Australia) J-P Smith	6	7^{7}
(India) A Chandrasekar (India) VS Prashanth	6^{5}	6^{4}
(India) S Balaji (Pakistan) A-u-H Qureshi	7^{7}	7^{7}

Semifinals
1	(Ecuador) G Escobar (Kazakhstan) A Nedovyesov	6^{3}	7	[10]
(Belgium) Z Bergs (Belgium) J De Loore	7^{7}	5	[5]
3	(United States) R Galloway (Australia) J-P Smith	1	6	[10]
(India) S Balaji (Pakistan) A-u-H Qureshi	6	3	[6]

Final
1	(Ecuador) G Escobar (Kazakhstan) A Nedovyesov	2	7	[11]
3	(United States) R Galloway (Australia) J-P Smith	6	5	[9]
