= Ella McDonald =

British tennis player (born 2005)

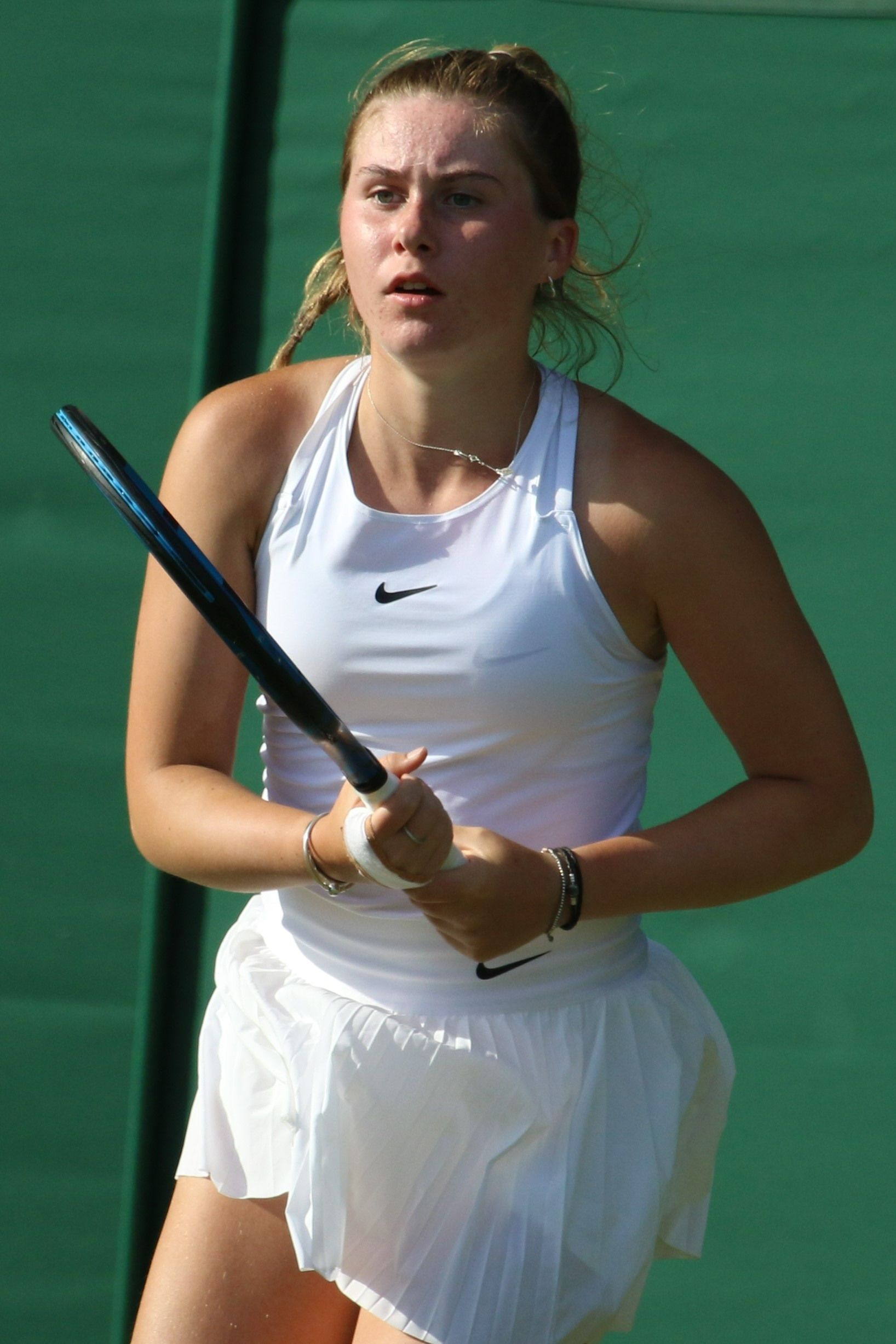
- McDonald, 2022 in Wimbledon
- Country (sports): Great Britain
- Born: 4 August 2005 (age 21)
- Plays: Left-handed
- Prize money: $162,729

Singles
- Career record: 101–85
- Career titles: 3 ITF
- Highest ranking: No. 352 (26 May 2025)
- Current ranking: No. 462 (31 August 2026)

Grand Slam singles results
- Wimbledon: Q1 (2022, 2025, 2026)

Doubles
- Career record: 90–32
- Career titles: 14 ITF
- Highest ranking: No. 160 (16 February 2026)
- Current ranking: No. 262 (31 August 2026)

Grand Slam doubles results
- Wimbledon: 2R (2025)
- Last updated on: 9 September 2026.

Ella McDonald (born 4 August 2005) is a British tennis player.

== Career ==
Given a wildcard into qualifying at the 2022 Wimbledon Championships, McDonald pushed veteran American Coco Vandeweghe to a third set tie-break.

=== 2023 ===
McDonald started 2023 in the British team at the United Cup alongside Cameron Norrie, Harriet Dart, Dan Evans, Katie Swan, Jan Choinski, Jonny O'Mara and Ranah Stoiber.

McDonald won her first ITF World Tour title in February 2023. She won the women's doubles alongside Maia Lumsden at the W25 Glasgow event held at the Stirling National Academy against Dominika Salkova and Anna Sisková. It was Lumsden and McDonald's debut tournament as a pair.

=== 2024 ===
In January, partnered with Finland's Laura Hietaranta, she won the Sunderland ITF doubles title in straight sets against Julie Belgraver and Katarina Stresnakova to win back-to-back 35k doubles titles.

At the 2024 Ilkley Trophy, she defeated Arianne Hartono in three sets and reached the quarterfinals with a win over Lanlana Tararudee, before losing to Jessika Ponchet.

She defeated world No. 50, Ana Bogdan, in three sets in qualifying at the 2024 Eastbourne International. Playing with Holly Hutchinson, she won the ladies doubles at the Roehampton W35 in August to claim their third trophy in four tournaments.

She won final of the women's doubles at the W50 Funchal tournament in Portugal in November alongside compatriot Holly Hutchinson, when they defeated Martyna Kubka and Sarah Beth Grey in the semifinal, before defeating Riya Bhatia and Polina Iatchenko in the final.

=== 2025 ===
Alongside Mingge Xu, she won the final of the women's doubles at the Wrexham Open in Wales in October 2025, when they defeated Valentina Ryser and Amarni Banks.

== Personal life ==
McDonald is from Preston, Lancashire. She is the daughter of Joanna McDonald and former professional footballer Neil McDonald. She has two siblings.

== ITF Circuit finals ==
=== Singles: 5 (4 titles, 1 runner-up) ===
Legend W35 tournaments (1–0) W35 tournaments (0–1) W15 tournaments (3–0)	Finals by surface Hard (4–1)

Result	W-L	Date	Tournament	Tier	Surface	Opponent	Score
Win	1–0	May 2024	ITF Monastir, Tunisia	W15	Hard	Daria Khomutsianskaya	6–4, 6–2
Win	2–0	Jul 2024	ITF Bissy-Chambéry, France	W15	Hard	Ekaterina Ovcharenko	6–0, 6–1
Win	3–0	May 2025	ITF Monastir, Tunisia	W15	Hard	(Ukraine) Kateryna Lazarenko	6–3, 6–2
Loss	3–1	Aug 2026	ITF Roehampton, United Kingdom	W35	Hard	(United Kingdom) Amelia Rajecki	0–6, 2–6
Win	4–1	Oct 2026	ITF Austin, United States	W50	Hard	(United States) Madison Brengle	7–5, 6–1

=== Doubles: 16 (15 titles, 1 runner-up) ===
Legend
W50 tournaments
W25/35 tournaments
W15 tournaments

Result	W–L	Date	Tournament	Tier	Surface	Partner	Opponents	Score
Win	1–0	Feb 2023	GB Pro-Series Glasgow, United Kingdom	W25	Hard (i)	(United Kingdom) Maia Lumsden	(Czech Republic) Dominika Šalková (Czech Republic) Anna Sisková	3–6, 6–1, [13–11]
Win	2–0	Jan 2024	GB Pro-Series Loughborough, UK	W35	Hard (i)	(United States) Liv Hovde	(United Kingdom) Alicia Barnett (United Kingdom) Sarah Beth Grey	4–6, 6–2, [10–7]
Win	3–0	Jan 2024	GB Pro-Series Sunderland, UK	W35	Hard (i)	(Finland) Laura Hietaranta	(France) Julie Belgraver (Slovakia) Katarína Strešnaková	6–4, 6–1
Win	4–0	May 2024	ITF Nottingham, UK	W35	Hard	(United Kingdom) Holly Hutchinson	(United Kingdom) Ali Collins (United Kingdom) Lauryn John-Baptiste	7–6^{(4)}, 7–6^{(5)}
Win	5–0	May 2024	ITF Monastir, Tunisia	W15	Hard	(United Kingdom) Talia Neilson-Gatenby	(China) Jiayu Xu (China) Zhang Ying	6–4, 6–2
Win	6–0	Jun 2024	ITF Madrid, Spain	W15	Clay	(United Kingdom) Holly Hutchinson	(Brazil) Ana Candiotto (Peru) Anastasia Iamachkine	6–4, 6–1
Win	7–0	Aug 2024	ITF Roehampton, UK	W35	Hard	(United Kingdom) Holly Hutchinson	(Australia) Gabriella Da Silva Fick (France) Alice Robbe	6–2, 3–6, [10–3]
Loss	7–1	Oct 2024	GB Pro-Series Loughborough, UK	W35	Hard (i)	(United Kingdom) Ranah Stoiber	(Greece) Valentini Grammatikopoulou (Estonia) Elena Malõgina	walkover
Win	8–1	Nov 2024	ITF Funchal, Portugal	W50	Hard	(United Kingdom) Holly Hutchinson	(India) Riya Bhatia (Russia) Polina Iatcenko	3–6, 6–2, [10–8]
Win	9–1	Mar 2025	ITF Helsinki, Finland	W35	Hard (i)	(Finland) Laura Hietaranta	(Turkey) Ayla Aksu (Poland) Martyna Kubka	6–3, 6–4
Win	10–1	Mar 2025	ITF Santo Domingo, Dominican Republic	W50	Hard	(United Kingdom) Holly Hutchinson	(United States) Carmen Corley (United States) Maribella Zamarripa	6–1, 6–4
Win	11–1	Apr 2025	ITF Santa Margherita di Pula, Italy	W35	Clay	(Finland) Laura Hietaranta	(Italy) Anastasia Bertacchi (Italy) Viola Turini	6–2, 6–3
Win	12–1	Nov 2025	ITF Funchal, Portugal	W50	Hard	(United Kingdom) Holly Hutchinson	(Belgium) Polina Bakhmutkina (Germany) Mina Hodzic	6–2, 4–6, [10–8]
Win	13–1	Jul 2026	ITF Dublin, Ireland	W50	Carpet	(United Kingdom) Amelia Rajecki	(United Kingdom) Alicia Dudeney (Poland) Zuzanna Pawlikowska	6–2, 6–1
Win	14–1	Aug 2026	ITF Roehampton, UK	W35	Hard	(United Kingdom) Emily Appleton	(United Kingdom) Brooke Black (Kenya) Angella Okutoyi	7–5, 7–6^{(2)}
Win	15–1	Oct 2026	ITF Austin, USA	W50	Hard	(United States) Kylie Collins	(United States) Ashley Lahey (Canada) Alexandra Vagramov	6–0, 6–1
