= Holly Hutchinson (tennis) =

British tennis player (born 1997)

- Country (sports): Great Britain
- Born: 11 September 1997 (age 28)
- Plays: Right-handed
- College: Old Dominion University
- Prize money: $30,605

Singles
- Career record: 72–90
- Highest ranking: No. 916 (21 April 2025)
- Current ranking: No. 1,032 (27 October 2025)

Doubles
- Career record: 80–57
- Career titles: 9 ITF
- Highest ranking: No. 258 (26 May 2025)
- Current ranking: No. 311 (27 October 2025)
- Last updated on: 27 October 2025.

Holly Hutchinson (born 11 September 1997) is a British tennis player.

== Career ==
She played her last junior match at the 2015 Wimbledon girls' doubles alongside Georgina Axon, losing 6-0 6-2 to Canadian duo Bianca Andreescu and Katherine Sebov.

Playing with Ella McDonald she won the ladies doubles at the Roehampton W35 in August 2024, to claim their third trophy in four tournaments. She won the final of the women’s doubles at the W50 Funchal tournament in Portugal in a November 2024 alongside compatriot McDonald, beating Martyna Kubka and Sarah Beth Grey in the semi final before defeating Riya Bhatia and Polina Iatcenko.

== ITF Circuit finals ==
=== Doubles: 12 (8 titles, 4 runner–ups) ===
Legend
W50 tournaments
W25/35 tournaments
W15 tournaments

Result	W–L	Date	Tournament	Tier	Surface	Partner	Opponents	Score
Loss	0–1	Jul 2023	ITF Cantanhede, Portugal	W25	Carpet	(United Kingdom) Madeleine Brooks	(Portugal) Francisca Jorge (Portugal) Matilde Jorge	3–6, 3–6
Loss	0–2	Jul 2023	ITF Roehampton, United Kingdom	W25	Hard	(United Kingdom) Madeleine Brooks	(India) Rutuja Bhosale (United Kingdom) Sarah Beth Grey	6–0, 4–6, [4–10]
Win	1–2	Jan 2024	ITF Monastir, Tunisia	W15	Hard	(Germany) Laura Böhner	(Netherlands) Rikke de Koning (Netherlands) Marente Sijbesma	6–4, 7–6^{(4)}
Win	2–2	Mar 2024	ITF Sharm El Sheikh, Egypt	W15	Hard	(France) Julie Belgraver	(Romania) Karola Bejenaru (South Korea) Jeong Bo-young	7–6^{(4)}, 3–6, [10–7]
Win	3–2	May 2024	ITF Nottingham, United Kingdom	W35	Hard	(United Kingdom) Ella McDonald	(United Kingdom) Ali Collins (United Kingdom) Lauryn John-Baptiste	7–6^{(4)}, 7–6^{(5)}
Win	4–2	Jun 2024	ITF Madrid, Spain	W15	Clay	(United Kingdom) Ella McDonald	(Brazil) Ana Candiotto (Peru) Anastasia Iamachkine	6–4, 6–1
Win	5–2	Aug 2024	ITF Roehampton, United Kingdom	W35	Hard	(United Kingdom) Ella McDonald	(Australia) Gabriella Da Silva Fick (France) Alice Robbe	6–2, 3–6, [10–3]
Win	6–2	Nov 2024	ITF Funchal, Portugal	W50	Hard	(United Kingdom) Ella McDonald	(India) Riya Bhatia; Polina Iatcenko	3–6, 6–2, [10–8]
Win	7–2	Mar 2025	ITF Santo Domingo, Dominican Republic	W50	Hard	(United Kingdom) Ella McDonald	(United States) Carmen Corley (United States) Maribella Zamarripa	6–1, 6–4
Win	8–2	Apr 2025	ITF Nottingham, United Kingdom	W35	Hard	(United Kingdom) Naiktha Bains	(United Kingdom) Brooke Black (United Kingdom) Daniela Piani	6–3, 6–3
Loss	8–3	Apr 2025	ITF Nottingham, United Kingdom	W35	Hard	(United Kingdom) Naiktha Bains	(France) Alice Robbe (Kosovo) Arlinda Rushiti	6–3, 4–6, [5–10]
Loss	8–4	Jul 2025	ITF Nottingham, United Kingdom	W50	Hard	(United Kingdom) Naiktha Bains	(United Kingdom) Victoria Allen (United States) Amelia Rajecki	4–6, 6–4, [6–10]
Win	9–4	Nov 2025	ITF Funchal, Portugal	W50	Hard	(United Kingdom) Ella McDonald	(Belgium) Polina Bakhmutkina (Germany) Mina Hodzic	6–2, 4–6, [10–8]

== Personal life ==
She is from Middlesex, England and attended Old Dominion University in the United States.
