= Ilkley Trophy =

Tennis tournament on grass courts

Lexus Ilkley Open
- 2026 Ilkley Open
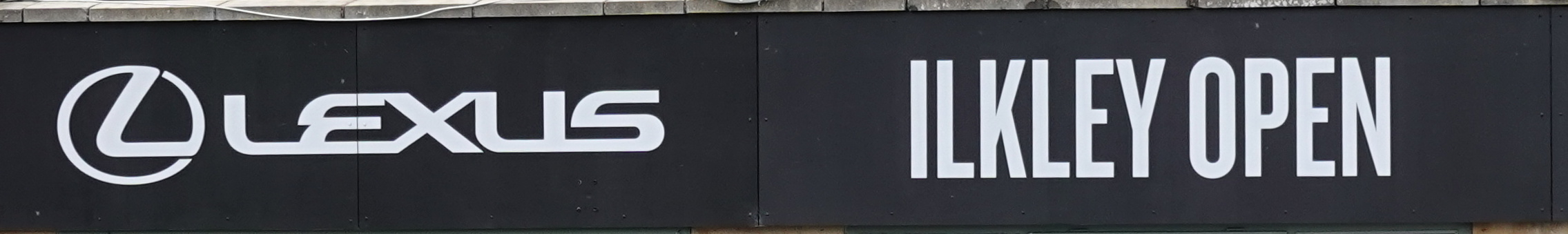

Tournament information
- Event name: Lexus Ilkley Open (2025-), Lexus Ilkley Trophy (2023–2024), Ilkley Trophy (2019-2022); Fuzion 100 Ilkley Trophy (2018); Aegon Ilkley Trophy (2015–17)
- Location: Ilkley, United Kingdom
- Venue: Ilkley Lawn Tennis and Squash Club
- Surface: Grass
- Website: Website

Current champions (2026)
- Men's singles: (China) Bu Yunchaokete
- Women's singles: (United States) Ashlyn Krueger
- Men's doubles: (United Kingdom) David Stevenson / (United Kingdom) Marcus Willis
- Women's doubles: (United Kingdom) Freya Christie / (United Kingdom) Eden Silva
ATP Tour
- Category: ATP Challenger Tour 125
- Draw: 32S / 32Q / 16D
- Prize money: €203,900
WTA Tour
- Category: WTA 125
- Draw: 32S / 24Q / 16D
- Prize money: $225,000

The Lexus Ilkley Open (previously named as the Ilkley Trophy, Fuzion 100 Ilkley Trophy and the Aegon Ilkley Trophy) is a professional tennis tournament played on grass courts. It is classified as a WTA 125 (since 2025) and an ATP Challenger 125 event. It has been held in Ilkley, United Kingdom, since 2015. The 2020 edition of the tournament was cancelled due to the COVID-19 pandemic and the 2021 edition was held in Nottingham instead because of the pandemic, but from 2022 on both legs of the tournament have been held.

== Past finals ==
=== Men's singles ===
Year	Champion	Runner-up	Score
2026	(China) Bu Yunchaokete	(United Kingdom) Jacob Fearnley	6–3, 7–6^{(7–1)}
2025	(Australia) Tristan Schoolkate	(United Kingdom) Jack Pinnington Jones	6–7^{(8–10)}, 6–4, 6–3
2024	(Belgium) David Goffin	(France) Harold Mayot	6–4, 6–2
2023	(Australia) Jason Kubler	(Austria) Sebastian Ofner	6–4, 6–4
2022	(Belgium) Zizou Bergs	(United States) Jack Sock	7–6^{(9–7)}, 2–6, 7–6^{(8–6)}
2021	Not held (Transferred to Nottingham)		
2020	Tournament cancelled due to the COVID-19 pandemic		
2019	(Germany) Dominik Köpfer	(Austria) Dennis Novak	3–6, 6–3, 7–6^{(7–5)}
2018	(Ukraine) Sergiy Stakhovsky	(Germany) Oscar Otte	6–4, 6–4
2017	(Hungary) Márton Fucsovics	(Australia) Alex Bolt	6–1, 6–4
2016	(Chinese Taipei) Lu Yen-hsun	(France) Vincent Millot	7–6^{(7–4)}, 6–2
2015	(United States) Denis Kudla	(Australia) Matthew Ebden	6–3, 6–4

=== Men's doubles ===
Year	Champions	Runners-up	Score
2026	(United Kingdom) David Stevenson (United Kingdom) Marcus Willis	(India) Rithvik Choudary Bollipalli (United States) Trey Hilderbrand	7–6^{(7–5)}, 6–3
2025	(Ecuador) Diego Hidalgo (United States) Patrik Trhac	(United Kingdom) Charles Broom (United Kingdom) Ben Jones	6–3, 6–7^{(8–10)}, [10–7]
2024	(United States) Evan King (United States) Reese Stalder	(United States) Christian Harrison (France) Fabrice Martin	6–3, 3–6, [10–6]
2023	(Ecuador) Gonzalo Escobar (Kazakhstan) Aleksandr Nedovyesov	(United States) Robert Galloway (Australia) John-Patrick Smith	2–6, 7–5, [11–9]
2022	(United Kingdom) Julian Cash (United Kingdom) Henry Patten	(India) Ramkumar Ramanathan (Australia) John-Patrick Smith	7–5, 6–4
2021	Not held (Transferred to Nottingham)		
2020	Tournament cancelled due to the COVID-19 pandemic		
2019	(Mexico) Santiago González (Pakistan) Aisam-ul-Haq Qureshi	(New Zealand) Marcus Daniell (India) Leander Paes	6–3, 6–4
2018	(United States) Austin Krajicek (India) Jeevan Nedunchezhiyan	(Germany) Kevin Krawietz (Germany) Andreas Mies	6–3, 6–3
2017	(India) Leander Paes (Canada) Adil Shamasdin	(United Kingdom) Brydan Klein (United Kingdom) Joe Salisbury	6–2, 2–6, [10–8]
2016	(Netherlands) Wesley Koolhof (Netherlands) Matwé Middelkoop	(Brazil) Marcelo Demoliner (Pakistan) Aisam-ul-Haq Qureshi	7–6^{(7–5)}, 0–6, [10–8]
2015	(New Zealand) Marcus Daniell (Brazil) Marcelo Demoliner	(United Kingdom) Ken Skupski (United Kingdom) Neal Skupski	7–6^{(7–3)}, 6–4

=== Women's singles ===
Year	Champion	Runner-up	Score
2026	(United States) Ashlyn Krueger	(Switzerland) Céline Naef	7–5, 6–2
2025	(United States) Iva Jovic	(Canada) Rebecca Marino	6–1, 6–3
↑ WTA 125 ↑
2024	(Canada) Rebecca Marino	(France) Jessika Ponchet	4–6, 6–1, 6–4
2023	(Sweden) Mirjam Björklund	(United States) Emma Navarro	6–4, 7–5
2022	(Hungary) Dalma Gálfi	(United Kingdom) Jodie Burrage	7–5, 4–6, 6–3
2021	Not held (Transferred to Nottingham)		
2020	Tournament cancelled due to the COVID-19 pandemic		
2019	(Romania) Monica Niculescu	(Hungary) Tímea Babos	6–2, 4–6, 6–3
2018	(Czech Republic) Tereza Smitková	(Ukraine) Dayana Yastremska	7–6^{(7–2)}, 3–6, 7–6^{(7–4)}
2017	(Slovakia) Magdaléna Rybáriková	(Belgium) Alison Van Uytvanck	7–5, 7–6^{(7–3)}
2016	(Russia) Evgeniya Rodina	(Slovakia) Rebecca Šramková	6–4, 6–4
2015	(Germany) Anna-Lena Friedsam	(Poland) Magda Linette	5–7, 6–3, 6–1

=== Women's doubles ===
Year	Champions	Runners-up	Score
2026	(United Kingdom) Freya Christie (United Kingdom) Eden Silva	(United Kingdom) Madeleine Brooks (United Kingdom) Amelia Rajecki	1–6, 6–4, [10–7]
2025	(Netherlands) Isabelle Haverlag (Switzerland) Simona Waltert	Vitalia Diatchenko (United Kingdom) Eden Silva	6–1, 6–1
↑ WTA 125 ↑
2024	(France) Kristina Mladenovic (Romania) Elena-Gabriela Ruse	(United States) Quinn Gleason (China) Tang Qianhui	6–2, 6–2
2023	(Japan) Nao Hibino (Serbia) Natalija Stevanović	(Poland) Maja Chwalińska (Czech Republic) Jesika Malečková	7–6^{(12–10)}, 7–6^{(7–5)}
2022	(Australia) Lizette Cabrera (South Korea) Jang Su-jeong	(United Kingdom) Naiktha Bains (United Kingdom) Maia Lumsden	6–7^{(7–9)}, 6–0, [11–9]
2021	Not held (Transferred to Nottingham)		
2020	Tournament cancelled due to the COVID-19 pandemic		
2019	(Brazil) Beatriz Haddad Maia (Brazil) Luisa Stefani	(Australia) Ellen Perez (Australia) Arina Rodionova	6–4, 6–7^{(5–7)}, [10–4]
2018	(United States) Asia Muhammad (United States) Maria Sanchez	(Russia) Natela Dzalamidze (Kazakhstan) Galina Voskoboeva	4–6, 6–3, [10–1]
2017	(Russia) Anna Blinkova (Russia) Alla Kudryavtseva	(Poland) Paula Kania (Belgium) Maryna Zanevska	6–1, 6–4
2016	(China) Yang Zhaoxuan (China) Zhang Kailin	(Belgium) An-Sophie Mestach (Australia) Storm Sanders	6–3, 7–6^{(7–5)}
2015	(Romania) Raluca Olaru (China) Xu Yifan	(Belgium) An-Sophie Mestach (Netherlands) Demi Schuurs	6–3, 6–4

== See also ==
- Defunct Ikley tournament
- List of tennis tournaments
