= Mirjam Björklund =

Swedish tennis player (born 1998)

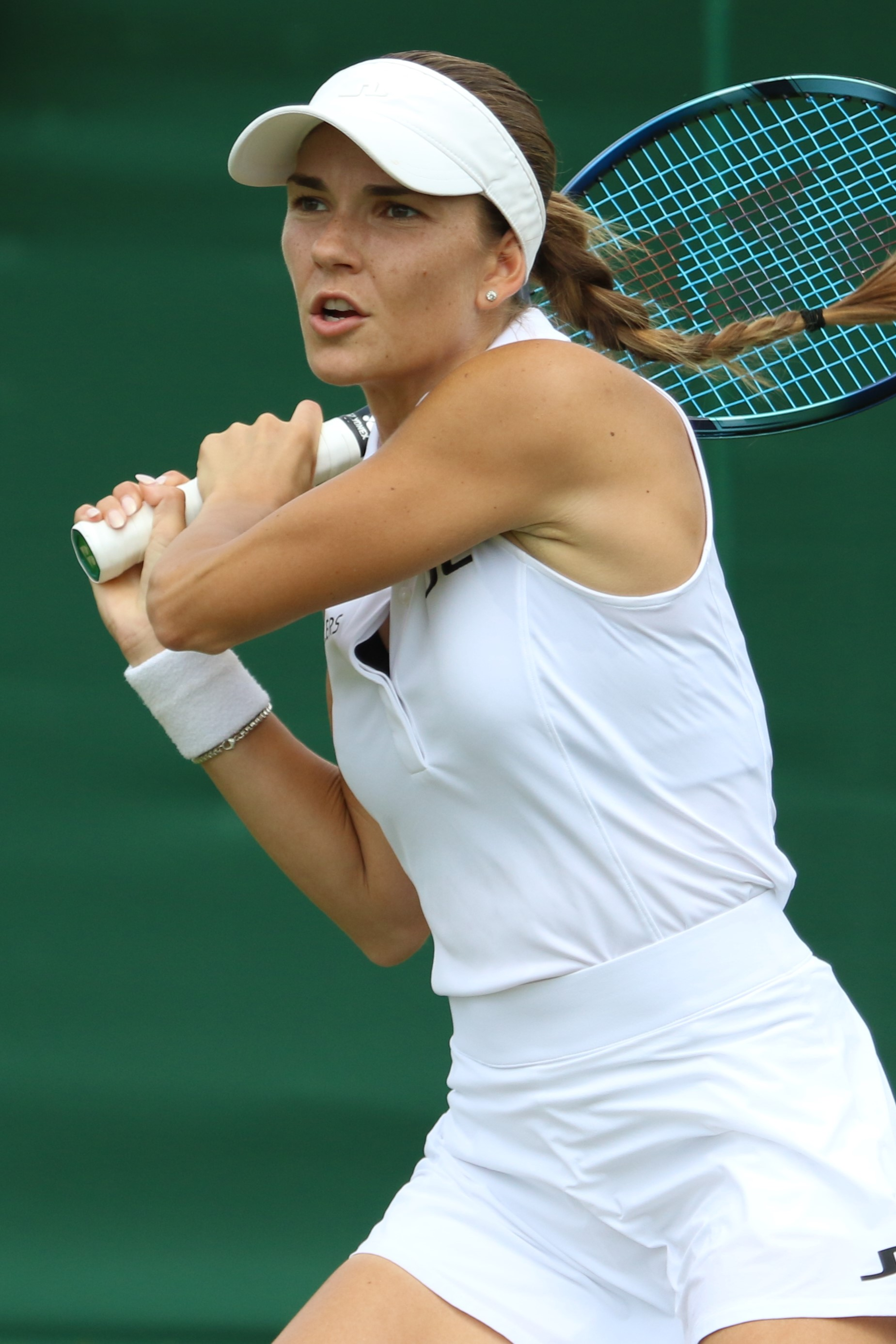
- Björklund at the 2023 Wimbledon Championships
- Full name: Mirjam Shapovalova (née Björklund)
- Country (sports): Sweden
- Residence: Stockholm, Sweden, Nassau, Bahamas
- Born: 29 July 1998 (age 28) Stockholm
- Height: 1.70 m (5 ft 7 in)
- Turned pro: 2017
- Retired: 2025
- Plays: Right (two-handed backhand)
- Prize money: $722,670
- Official website: mirjambjorklund.com

Singles
- Career record: 215–144
- Career titles: 10 ITF
- Highest ranking: No. 123 (20 June 2022)

Grand Slam singles results
- Australian Open: Q3 (2022)
- French Open: 1R (2022)
- Wimbledon: 1R (2022)
- US Open: 1R (2023)

Doubles
- Career record: 45–39
- Career titles: 1 WTA Challenger, 2 ITF
- Highest ranking: No. 281 (31 January 2022)

Team competitions
- Fed Cup: 3–3

Mirjam Shapovalova (née Björklund) (born 29 July 1998) is a Swedish former professional tennis player. Her career-high singles ranking by the WTA was No. 123, achieved on 20 June 2022. She reached a highest doubles ranking of No. 281 on 31 January 2022. She won one doubles title on the WTA Challenger Tour as well as ten titles in singles and two in doubles on the ITF Women's Circuit.

== Career ==
Björklund made her WTA Tour main-draw debut at the 2017 Swedish Open, where she played Kateryna Kozlova in the first round.

At the 2022 French Open, she qualified to make her major tournament debut but lost to fellow qualifier Donna Vekić in the first round.

Björklund qualified for her second major in a row at the 2022 Wimbledon Championships where she faced world No. 2 Ons Jabeur in the first round.

She qualified for her first WTA 1000 tournament at the 2023 Miami Open, defeating world No. 71 Jasmine Paolini in the first round, before losing to world No. 22 Jeļena Ostapenko in the second round.

Björklund won the biggest title of her career to date, and first on grass, at the W100 2023 Ilkley Trophy, defeating the top seed, Emma Navarro, in the final.

She qualified for her third major tournament at the 2023 US Open, and was beaten in the first round by 32nd seed, Elise Mertens, in a third set tiebreaker.

Given a wildcard entry into the 2024 Swedish Open, Björklund lost in the first round to Darja Semeņistaja in straight sets.

She announced her retirement from professional tennis in September 2025, citing surgery to remove a cyst in her neck as the catalyst for her decision.

== Personal life ==
Björklund started in June 2019 dating Canadian tennis player Denis Shapovalov. In July 2023, they announced their engagement. In September 2025 they were married in Greece. She started coaching Shapovalov in February 2026, after his split from his previous coach, Mikael Tillström.

She has one sister and is of Spanish descent through her mother.

== Performance timeline ==
Key
W	F	SF	QF	#R	RR	Q#	DNQ	A	NH

(W) winner; (F) finalist; (SF) semifinalist; (QF) quarterfinalist; (#R) rounds 4, 3, 2, 1; (RR) round-robin stage; (Q#) qualification round; (DNQ) did not qualify; (A) absent; (NH) not held; (SR) strike rate (events won / competed); (W–L) win–loss record.
To avoid confusion and double counting, these charts are updated at the conclusion of a tournament or when the player's participation has ended.

Only main-draw results in WTA Tour, Grand Slam tournaments, Billie Jean King Cup, United Cup, Hopman Cup and Olympic Games are included in win–loss records.

=== Singles ===
Current through the 2025 Australian Open.

Tournament	2017	2018	2019	2020	2021	2022	2023	2024	2025	SR	W–L
Grand Slam tournaments
Australian Open	A	A	A	A	A	Q3	Q2	A	Q2	0 / 0	0–0
French Open	A	A	A	A	A	1R	Q3	A	A	0 / 1	0–1
Wimbledon	A	A	A	NH	A	1R	Q1	A	A	0 / 1	0–1
US Open	A	A	A	A	A	Q2	1R	Q2	A	0 / 1	0–1
Win–Loss	0–0	0–0	0–0	0–0	0–0	0–2	0–1	0–0	0–0	0 / 3	0–3
National representation
Billie Jean King Cup (Note: Formerly known as Fed Cup until 2020.)	A	Z1	POZ1	Z1 (Note: Edition is split into the two years due to COVID-19.)		A	A	A		0 / 0	2–2
WTA 1000 tournaments
Dubai / Qatar Open (Note: The first Premier 5 event of the year has switched back and forth between the Dubai Tennis Championships and the Qatar Ladies Open since 2009. Dubai was classified as a Premier 5 event from 2009 to 2011 before being succeeded by Doha for the 2012–2014 period. In 2015, Dubai regained its Premier 5 status while Doha was demoted to Premier status. The Premier 5 tournaments were reclassified as WTA 1000 tournaments in 2021.)	A	A	A	A	A	Q1	A	A	A	0 / 0	0–0
Indian Wells Open	A	A	A	NH	A	A	Q1	A	Q2	0 / 0	0–0
Miami Open	A	A	A	NH	Q1	Q1	2R	A	Q1	0 / 1	1–1
Madrid Open	A	A	A	NH	A	A	Q1	A	Q1	0 / 0	0–0
Italian Open	A	A	A	A	A	A	Q1	A	A	0 / 0	0–0
Canadian Open	A	A	A	NH	A	A	Q1	Q1	A	0 / 0	0–0
Cincinnati Open	A	A	A	A	A	A	A	A	A	0 / 0	0–0
Guadalajara Open	NH					A	A	A	-	0 / 0	0–0
China Open	A	A	A	NH			A	A	-	0 / 0	0–0
Wuhan Open	A	A	A	NH				A	-	0 / 0	0–0
Win–Loss	0–0	0–0	0–0	0–0	0–0	0–0	1–1	0–0	0–0	0 / 1	1–1
Career statistics
	2017	2018	2019	2020	2021	2022	2023	2024	2025	SR	W–L
Tournaments	1	0	0 (Note: During the season, she did not play in the main draw of any tour-level tournaments. However, she played at the Billie Jean King Cup, which is not counted as a played tournament but matches counted.)	0	0	5	5	0	0	Career total: 11	
Titles	0	0	0	0	0	0	0	0	0	Career total: 0	
Finals	0	0	0	0	0	0	0	0	0	Career total: 0	
Overall win-loss	0–1	0–0	1–0	0–0	1–2	2–5	4–5	0–0	0–0	0 / 11	8–13
Year-end ranking	613	419	320	313	207	153	163	757	754	$722,670	

== WTA 125 finals ==
=== Doubles: 1 (title) ===
Result	Date	Tournament	Surface	Partner	Opponents	Score
Win	Jul 2021	Swedish Open, Sweden	Clay	(Switzerland) Leonie Küng	(Slovakia) Tereza Mihalíková (Russia) Kamilla Rakhimova	5–7, 6–3, [10–5]

== ITF Circuit finals ==
=== Singles: 14 (10 titles, 4 runner-ups) ===
Legend $100,000 tournaments $60,000 tournaments $25,000 tournaments $15,000 tournaments	Finals by surface Hard (3–1) Clay (6–3) Grass (1–0)

Result	W–L	Date	Tournament	Tier	Surface	Opponent	Score
Win	1–0	Jul 2017	ITF Knokke, Belgium	15,000	Clay	(France) Marie Témin	6–3, 6–4
Loss	1–1	Jul 2017	ITF Brussels, Belgium	15,000	Clay	(Mexico) Ana Sofía Sánchez	6–3, 4–6, 1–6
Loss	1–2	May 2018	ITF Gothenburg, Sweden	15,000	Clay	(United States) Raveena Kingsley	2–6, 4–6
Win	2–2	Jul 2018	ITF Brussels, Belgium	15,000	Clay	(Germany) Julyette Steur	7–5, 6–1
Win	3–2	Jan 2019	ITF Monastir, Tunisia	15,000	Hard	(Kazakhstan) Gozal Ainitdinova	6–2, 7–5
Win	4–2	Feb 2019	ITF Monastir, Tunisia	15,000	Hard	(Greece) Despina Papamichail	1–6, 7–6^{(3)}, 6–3
Win	5–2	Mar 2019	ITF Tabarka, Tunisia	15,000	Clay	(Slovakia) Chantal Škamlová	6–3, 6–2
Win	6–2	May 2019	ITF Pula, Italy	25,000	Clay	(Brazil) Gabriela Cé	6–3, 7–6^{(3)}
Win	7–2	Aug 2021	ITF Koksijde, Belgium	25,000	Clay	(Bosnia and Herzegovina) Dea Herdzelas	7–6^{(6)}, 6–3
Loss	7–3	Sep 2021	ITF Trieste, Italy	25,000	Clay	(Croatia) Tara Würth	6–3, 4–6, 5–7
Win	8–3	Sep 2021	ITF Austin, United States	25,000	Hard	(United States) Kayla Day	2–6, 6–2, 6–2
Win	9–3	Apr 2022	ITF Orlando Pro, United States	25,000	Clay	(Romania) Alexandra Cadanțu-Ignatik	6–3, 6–4
Loss	9–4	Aug 2022	Bronx Open, United States	60,000	Hard	Kamilla Rakhimova	2–6, 3–6
Win	10–4	Jun 2023	Ilkley Trophy, United Kingdom	100,000	Grass	(United States) Emma Navarro	6–4, 7–5

=== Doubles: 5 (2 titles, 3 runner-ups) ===
Legend
$60,000 tournaments
$25,000 tournaments
$10/15,000 tournaments

Result	W–L	Date	Tournament	Tier	Surface	Partner	Opponents	Score
Loss	0–1	Oct 2016	ITF Stockholm, Sweden	10,000	Hard (i)	(Sweden) Brenda Njuki	(Romania) Laura-Ioana Andrei (Germany) Anna Klasen	2–6, 2–6
Win	1–1	Nov 2017	ITF Hammamet, Tunisia	15,000	Clay	(Netherlands) Lexie Stevens	(Italy) Beatrice Lombardo (Italy) Gaia Squarcialupi	6–3, 6–0
Loss	1–2	Aug 2018	ITF Las Palmas de Gran Canaria, Spain	25,000	Clay	(United Kingdom) Emily Arbuthnott	(Netherlands) Quirine Lemoine (Netherlands) Eva Wacanno	6–7^{(6)}, 1–6
Loss	1–3	Aug 2021	Reinert Open, Germany	60,000	Clay	(Australia) Jaimee Fourlis	(Kazakhstan) Anna Danilina (Ukraine) Valeriya Strakhova	6–4, 5–7, [4–10]
Win	2–3	Oct 2021	ITF Redding, United States	25,000	Hard	(United Kingdom) Katie Swan	(Slovenia) Dalila Jakupović (China) Lu Jiajing	6–3, 1–6, [10–3]
