= 2026 Jingshan Tennis Open – Women's singles =

Women's singles
- 2026 Jingshan Tennis Open

Final
- Champion: Alexandra Shubladze
- Runner-up: (Spain) Jéssica Bouzas Maneiro
- Score: 6–3, 6–2

Events
Singles	men	women
Doubles	men	women
- Jingshan Tennis Open

Alexandra Shubladze won the title, defeating Jéssica Bouzas Maneiro 6–3, 6–2 in the final.

Lulu Sun was the reigning champion, but did not participate this year.

== Seeds ==
1. (Spain) Jéssica Bouzas Maneiro (final)
2. (France) Fiona Ferro (second round, retired)
3. (Australia) Emerson Jones (semifinals)
4. (Italy) Tyra Caterina Grant (first round)
5. (Belgium) Sofia Costoulas (second round)
6. Alexandra Shubladze (champion)
7. Alevtina Ibragimova (second round)
8. (Spain) Sara Sorribes Tormo (quarterfinals)

== Draw ==
Key

- Q = Qualifier
- WC = Wild card
- LL = Lucky loser
- Alt = Alternate
- ITF = ITF entry
- PR = Protected ranking
- SR = Special ranking
- SE = Special exempt
- JE = Junior exempt
- JR = Junior Accelerator Programme entrant
- CO = College Accelerator Programme entrant
- NG = Next Gen Accelerator Program entrant
- w/o = Walkover
- r = Retired
- d = Defaulted

=== Finals ===
Semifinals
1	(Spain) Jéssica Bouzas Maneiro	6	6
Aliona Falei	3	3
3	(Australia) Emerson Jones	5	4
6	Alexandra Shubladze	7	6

Final
1	(Spain) Jéssica Bouzas Maneiro	3	2
6	Alexandra Shubladze	6	6

=== Top half ===
First round
1	(Spain) J Bouzas Maneiro	6	4
(China) F Tian	3	1^{r}
Q	(United Kingdom) A Rajecki	4	6	6^{1}
WC	(China) Yu Wang	6	3	7^{7}
(Ukraine) K Zavatska	3	0
S Lansere	6	6
PR	(France) K Mladenovic	2	5
5	(Belgium) S Costoulas	6	7
4	(Italy) TC Grant	4	1
A Falei	6	6
Q	K Sidorova	6	6
D Egorova	3	4
(Japan) M Yamaguchi	1	3
Q	(China) W Zheng	6	6
(Slovakia) V Morvayová	0	6	6^{1}
8	(Spain) S Sorribes Tormo	6	2	7^{7}

Second round
1	(Spain) J Bouzas Maneiro	6	6
WC	(China) Yu Wang	0	2
S Lansere	6	6
5	(Belgium) S Costoulas	3	4
A Falei	4	7^{7}	6
Q	K Sidorova	6	6^{2}	4
Q	(China) W Zheng	6	2	3
8	(Spain) S Sorribes Tormo	4	6	6

Quarterfinals
1	(Spain) J Bouzas Maneiro	6	6
S Lansere	2	2
A Falei	6	6
8	(Spain) S Sorribes Tormo	4	2

Semifinals
1	(Spain) J Bouzas Maneiro	6	6
A Falei	3	3

=== Bottom half ===
First round
7	A Ibragimova	3	6	7
D Khamutsianskaya	6	4	5
(Japan) K Okamura	6	6
WC	(China) R Wu	2	4
(Japan) S Saito	2	3
WC	(China) C Zhu	6	6
(Japan) H Kaji	2	4
3	(Australia) E Jones	6	6
6	A Shubladze	7	6
(Japan) R Saigo	5	3
(China) Jia Lu	6	6
(Japan) H Kinoshita	4	3
WC	(China) S Wei	6	1	7^{8}
Q	(China) Y Huang	3	6	6^{6}
(China) Y Yang	4	6	1
2	(France) F Ferro	6	2	6

Second round
7	A Ibragimova	7^{9}	1	3
(Japan) K Okamura	6^{7}	6	6
WC	(China) C Zhu	1	4
3	(Australia) E Jones	6	6
6	A Shubladze	6	6
(China) Jia Lu	0	2
WC	(China) S Wei	6	2
2	(France) F Ferro	1	0^{r}

Quarterfinals
(Japan) K Okamura	6^{4}	6^{3}
3	(Australia) E Jones	7^{7}	7^{7}
6	A Shubladze	6^{3}	6	6
WC	(China) S Wei	7^{7}	3	2

Semifinals
3	(Australia) E Jones	5	4
6	A Shubladze	7	6

== Qualifying ==
=== Seeds ===
1. (Indonesia) Priska Nugroho (qualifying competition)
2. (United Kingdom) Amelia Rajecki (qualified)
3. (China) Wang Jiaqi (qualifying competition)
4. Kristiana Sidorova (qualified)
5. (Japan) Natsumi Kawaguchi (first round)
6. (China) Yuan Chengyiyi (qualifying competition)
7. (China) Huang Yujia (qualified)
8. (China) Zheng Wushuang (qualified)

=== Qualifiers ===
1. (China) Huang Yujia
2. (United Kingdom) Amelia Rajecki
3. (China) Zheng Wushuang
4. Kristiana Sidorova

=== Qualifying draw ===
==== First qualifier ====
First round				Qualifying competition
				1	(Indonesia) Priska Nugroho	4	5
				7	(China) Huang Yujia	6	7
	Ekaterina Yashina	2	2	7	(China) Huang Yujia	6	7
7	(China) Huang Yujia	6	6

==== Second qualifier ====
First round
2	(United Kingdom) Amelia Rajecki	6	1	6
(Japan) Hiroko Kuwata	1	6	1
(Slovenia) Nika Radišić	2	3
6	(China) Yuan Chengyiyi	6	6

Qualifying competition
2	(United Kingdom) Amelia Rajecki	6	7
6	(China) Yuan Chengyiyi	3	5

==== Third qualifier ====
First round
3	(China) Wang Jiaqi	7	7
(China) Zhang Ying	5	5
Polina Leykina	2	2
8	(China) Zheng Wushuang	6	6

Qualifying competition
3	(China) Wang Jiaqi	2	6^{2}
8	(China) Zheng Wushuang	6	7^{7}

==== Fourth qualifier ====
First round
4	Kristiana Sidorova	3	6	6
(Kazakhstan) Aruzhan Sagandykova	6	2	1
(China) Guo Meiqi	6	6
5	(Japan) Natsumi Kawaguchi	0	3

Qualifying competition
4	Kristiana Sidorova	6	6
(China) Guo Meiqi	3	4
