= 2025 Ilkley Open – Women's doubles =

Women's doubles
- 2025 Ilkley Open

Final
- Champions: (Netherlands) Isabelle Haverlag (Switzerland) Simona Waltert
- Runners-up: Vitalia Diatchenko (United Kingdom) Eden Silva
- Score: 6–1, 6–1

Events
Singles	men	women
Doubles	men	women
← 2024 ·	Ilkley Trophy	· 2026 →

Isabelle Haverlag and Simona Waltert won the title, defeating Vitalia Diatchenko and Eden Silva 6–1, 6–1 in the final.

Kristina Mladenovic and Elena-Gabriela Ruse were the reigning champions, but Mladenovic did not participate this year and Ruse chose to compete in s'Hertogenbosch instead.

== Seeds ==
1. (United Kingdom) Harriet Dart / (United Kingdom) Maia Lumsden (semifinals)
2. (United Kingdom) Madeleine Brooks / (Australia) Petra Hule (first round)
3. (Netherlands) Isabelle Haverlag / (Switzerland) Simona Waltert (champions)
4. (United Kingdom) Alicia Barnett / (France) Elixane Lechemia (first round)

== Draw ==
=== Key ===
- Q = Qualifier
- WC = Wild card
- LL = Lucky loser
- Alt = Alternate
- ITF = ITF entry
- PR = Protected ranking
- SR = Special ranking
- SE = Special exempt
- JE = Junior exempt
- JR = Junior Accelerator Programme entrant
- CO = College Accelerator Programme entrant
- NG = Next Gen Accelerator Program entrant
- w/o = Walkover
- r = Retired
- d = Defaulted

=== Draw ===
First round
1	(United Kingdom) H Dart (United Kingdom) M Lumsden	7^{7}	6
WC	(United Kingdom) H Hutchinson (United Kingdom) E McDonald	6^{3}	0
(United States) C Corley (United States) I Corley	2	6^{5}
(United Kingdom) E Appleton (Canada) R Marino	6	7^{7}
4	(United Kingdom) A Barnett (France) E Lechemia	3	6^{4}
(Canada) K Cross (United States) A Smith	6	7^{7}
(Algeria) I Ibbou (Switzerland) N Karamoko	6^{6}	6	[7]
V Diatchenko (United Kingdom) E Silva	7^{8}	2	[10]
(France) D Parry (Ukraine) Y Starodubtseva	6	6
WC	(United Kingdom) A Banks (United Kingdom) R Stoiber	3	1
(Australia) O Gadecki (France) L Jeanjean	6	0	[6]
3	(Netherlands) I Haverlag (Switzerland) S Waltert	3	6	[10]
(France) E Jacquemot (United States) V Lepchenko	6	6
(United Kingdom) A Rajecki (United Kingdom) M Xu	4	1
(United Kingdom) N Bains (United Kingdom) T Moore	6^{2}	6	[10]
2	(United Kingdom) M Brooks (Australia) P Hule	7^{7}	3	[4]

Quarterfinals
1	(United Kingdom) H Dart (United Kingdom) M Lumsden	6	6
(United Kingdom) E Appleton (Canada) R Marino	4	3
(Canada) K Cross (United States) A Smith	3	6^{7}
V Diatchenko (United Kingdom) E Silva	6	7^{9}
(France) D Parry (Ukraine) Y Starodubtseva
3	(Netherlands) I Haverlag (Switzerland) S Waltert	w/o
(France) E Jacquemot (United States) V Lepchenko	6	4	[10]
(United Kingdom) N Bains (United Kingdom) T Moore	4	6	[6]

Semifinals
1	(United Kingdom) H Dart (United Kingdom) M Lumsden	4	3
V Diatchenko (United Kingdom) E Silva	6	6
3	(Netherlands) I Haverlag (Switzerland) S Waltert	6	6
(France) E Jacquemot (United States) V Lepchenko	2	2

Final
V Diatchenko (United Kingdom) E Silva	1	1
3	(Netherlands) I Haverlag (Switzerland) S Waltert	6	6
