= 2026 Jingshan Tennis Open =

- Date: 28 September–4 October
- Edition: 2nd
- Category: WTA 125; ATP Challenger 100
- Prize money: $177,000 (men) $115,000 (women)
- Surface: Hard
- Location: Jingshan, China

Champions

Men's singles
- (South Africa) Lloyd Harris

Women's singles
- Alexandra Shubladze

Men's doubles
- (Ecuador) Gonzalo Escobar / (India) Niki Kaliyanda Poonacha

Women's doubles
- (United Kingdom) Madeleine Brooks / (United Kingdom) Amelia Rajecki
- Jingshan Tennis Open

The 2026 Jingshan Tennis Open was a professional tennis tournament played on outdoor hardcourts. It was the second edition of the tournament and part of the 2026 WTA 125 tournaments and the 2026 ATP Challenger Tour. It took place at the Jingshan International Tennis Tournament Center in Jingshan, China between 28 September and 4 October 2026.

== Men's singles main-draw entrants ==
=== Seeds ===
Country	Player	Rank^{1}	Seed
USA	Michael Zheng	92	1
AUS	Dane Sweeny	110	2
CZE	Dalibor Svrčina	128	3
GRE	Stefanos Sakellaridis	134	4
FRA	Alexandre Müller	135	5
RSA	Lloyd Harris	136	6
AUS	Alex Bolt	165	7
ITA	Federico Cinà	170	8

- ^{1} Rankings are as of 21 September 2026.

=== Other entrants ===
The following players received wildcards into the singles main draw:

- (China) Liu Hanyi
- (China) Zeng Yaojie
- (United States) Michael Zheng

The following players received entry into the singles main draw as alternates:

- (Japan) Masamichi Imamura
- Semen Pankin
- (Japan) Yuta Shimizu
- (France) Arthur Weber

The following players received entry from the qualifying draw:

- (France) Térence Atmane
- (Italy) Mattia Bellucci
- (Australia) Omar Jasika
- Marat Sharipov
- (Australia) Adam Walton
- (United States) Evan Zhu

== Women's singles main-draw entrants ==
=== Seeds ===
Country	Player	Rank^{1}	Seed
ESP	Jéssica Bouzas Maneiro	93	1
FRA	Fiona Ferro	107	2
AUS	Emerson Jones	133	3
ITA	Tyra Caterina Grant	150	4
BEL	Sofia Costoulas	152	5
	Alexandra Shubladze	158	6
	Alevtina Ibragimova	166	7
ESP	Sara Sorribes Tormo	188	8

- ^{1} Rankings are as of 21 September 2026.

=== Other entrants ===
The following players received wildcards into the singles main draw:

- (China) Wang Yuhan
- (China) Wei Sijia
- (China) Wu Ruxi
- (China) Zhu Chenting

The following player received entry using a protected ranking:

- (France) Kristina Mladenovic

The following players received entry from the qualifying draw:

- (China) Huang Yujia
- (United Kingdom) Amelia Rajecki
- Kristiana Sidorova
- (China) Zheng Wushuang

=== Withdrawals ===
Before the tournament

- (Australia) Lizette Cabrera → replaced by Daria Egorova
- (United States) Hina Inoue → replaced by (China) Lu Jiajing
- (United States) Claire Liu → replaced by (China) Yang Yidi

=== Retirements ===
- (France) Fiona Ferro
- (China) Tian Fangran

== Women's doubles entrants ==
=== Seeds ===
Country	Player	Country	Player	Rank	Seed
CZE	Anastasia Dețiuc		Irina Khromacheva	117	1
JPN	Makoto Ninomiya	SLO	Nika Radišić	139	2
JPN	Eri Hozumi	ESP	Sara Sorribes Tormo	169	3
TPE	Cho I-hsuan	TPE	Cho Yi-tsen	184	4

- Rankings as of 21 September 2026.

=== Other entrants ===
The following pair received a wildcard into the doubles main draw:

- (China) Guo Meiqi / (China) Yang Yidi

=== Retirement ===
- (China) Feng Shuo / (China) Tian Fangran

== Champions ==
=== Men's singles ===
- (South Africa) Lloyd Harris def. (Italy) Mattia Bellucci 1–6, 6–3, 7–6^{(7–4)}.

=== Women's singles ===
- Alexandra Shubladze def. (Spain) Jéssica Bouzas Maneiro 6–3, 6–2

=== Men's doubles ===
- (Ecuador) Gonzalo Escobar / (India) Niki Kaliyanda Poonacha def. (Mexico) Miguel Ángel Reyes-Varela / (United States) Reese Stalder 7–5, 6–2.

=== Women's doubles ===
- (United Kingdom) Madeleine Brooks / (United Kingdom) Amelia Rajecki def. Sofya Lansere / Alexandra Shubladze 6–7^{(5–7)}, 7–6^{(7–1)}, [10–6]
