= 2026 Shimadzu All Japan Indoor Tennis Championships – Doubles =

Doubles
- 2026 Shimadzu All Japan Indoor Tennis Championships

Final
- Champions: (Belgium) Sofia Costoulas; Sofya Lansere
- Runners-up: (Japan) Hayu Kinoshita (Japan) Sara Saito
- Score: 6–2, 6–4

Events
| Singles | Doubles |
- Shimadzu All Japan Indoor Tennis Championships

Saki Imamura and Park So-hyun were the defending champions but Imamura chose not to participate. Park partnered Tian Fangran, but lost in the first round to Hayu Kinoshita and Sara Saito.

Sofia Costoulas and Sofya Lansere won the title, defeating Kinoshita and Saito 6–2, 6–4 in the final.

== Seeds ==
1. (Japan) Momoko Kobori / (Japan) Ayano Shimizu (withdrew)
2. (Chinese Taipei) Cho I-hsuan / (Chinese Taipei) Cho Yi-tsen (first round)
3. (Japan) Mana Ayukawa / (Japan) Kanako Morisaki (semifinals)
4. (Japan) Hiroko Kuwata / (Japan) Ikumi Yamazaki (quarterfinals)

== Draw ==
Key

- Q = Qualifier
- WC = Wild card
- LL = Lucky loser
- Alt = Alternate
- ITF = ITF entry
- PR = Protected ranking
- SR = Special ranking
- SE = Special exempt
- JE = Junior exempt
- JR = Junior Accelerator Programme entrant
- CO = College Accelerator Programme entrant
- NG = Next Gen Accelerator Program entrant
- w/o = Walkover
- r = Retired
- d = Defaulted

=== Draw ===
First round
Alt | (Japan) Y Hosoki (Japan) N Katsumi | 5 | 3
WC | (Japan) A Nagata (Japan) H Sato | 7 | 6
(Belgium) S Costoulas; S Lansere | 2 | 6 | [10]
(Chinese Taipei) Y-h Lee (China) Y Zhang | 6 | 4 | [8]
3 | (Japan) M Ayukawa (Japan) K Morisaki | 6 | 4 | [13]
(Japan) N Kawaguchi (China) Y Yang | 3 | 6 | [11]
(Japan) K Okamura (Thailand) P Plipuech | w/o
(China) Z Bai (China) Y Ma
(South Korea) S-h Park (China) F Tian | 3 | 6 | [8]
(Japan) H Kinoshita (Japan) S Saito | 6 | 4 | [10]
WC | (Japan) N Suzuki (Japan) K Tsutsumi | 3 | 2
4 | (Japan) H Kuwata (Japan) I Yamazaki | 6 | 6
(Japan) M Matsuda (Japan) E Shimizu | 3 | 4
WC | (Japan) R Tsuda (Japan) K Yoshida | 6 | 6
(Cyprus) R Șerban (Liechtenstein) K von Deichmann | 3 | 7^{7} | [10]
2 | (Chinese Taipei) I-h Cho (Chinese Taipei) Y-t Cho | 6 | 6^{5} | [1]

Quarterfinals
WC | (Japan) A Nagata (Japan) H Sato | 6 | 3 | [10]
(Belgium) S Costoulas; S Lansere | 3 | 6 | [12]
3 | (Japan) M Ayukawa (Japan) K Morisaki | w/o
(Japan) K Okamura (Thailand) P Plipuech
(Japan) H Kinoshita (Japan) S Saito | 6 | 6
4 | (Japan) H Kuwata (Japan) I Yamazaki | 4 | 4
WC | (Japan) R Tsuda (Japan) K Yoshida | 6 | 7
(Cyprus) R Șerban (Liechtenstein) K von Deichmann | 3 | 5

Semifinals
(Belgium) S Costoulas; S Lansere | 4 | 6 | [10]
3 | (Japan) M Ayukawa (Japan) K Morisaki | 6 | 2 | [8]
(Japan) H Kinoshita (Japan) S Saito | 5 | 6 | [10]
WC | (Japan) R Tsuda (Japan) K Yoshida | 7 | 2 | [7]

Final
(Belgium) S Costoulas; S Lansere | 6 | 6
(Japan) H Kinoshita (Japan) S Saito | 2 | 4
