= 2025 Ilkley Open =

- Date: 9–15 June 2025
- Edition: 9th
- Category: ATP Challenger Tour 125; WTA 125 tournaments
- Surface: Grass / Outdoor
- Location: Ilkley, United Kingdom

Champions

Men's singles
- (Australia) Tristan Schoolkate

Women's singles
- (United States) Iva Jovic

Men's doubles
- (Ecuador) Diego Hidalgo / (United States) Patrik Trhac

Women's doubles
- (Netherlands) Isabelle Haverlag / (Switzerland) Simona Waltert
- Ilkley Open

The 2025 Lexus Ilkley Open was a tennis tournament played on outdoor grass courts. It was the ninth edition of the tournament, which was part of the 2025 ATP Challenger 125 and the 2025 WTA 125 tournaments (upgraded from ITF status in previous years). It took place in Ilkley, United Kingdom between 9 and 15 June 2025.

== ATP singles main-draw entrants ==
=== Seeds ===
| Country | Player | Rank^{1} | Seed |
|---|---|---|---|
| POL | Kamil Majchrzak | 96 | 1 |
| USA | Brandon Holt | 101 | 2 |
| GBR | Billy Harris | 102 | 3 |
| CRO | Marin Čilić | 104 | 4 |
| USA | Christopher Eubanks | 105 | 5 |
| FRA | Térence Atmane | 121 | 6 |
| AUS | Tristan Schoolkate | 128 | 7 |
| ESP | Martín Landaluce | 145 | 8 |

- ^{1} Rankings are as of 26 May 2025.

=== Other entrants ===
The following players received wildcards into the singles main draw:

- (United Kingdom) Jay Clarke
- (United Kingdom) Jack Pinnington Jones
- (United Kingdom) Henry Searle

The following players received entry into the singles main draw using a protected ranking:

- (South Africa) Lloyd Harris
- (Switzerland) Leandro Riedi

The following player received entry into the singles main draw as a special exempt:

- (United States) Colton Smith

The following player received entry into the singles main draw as an alternate:

- (Australia) Alex Bolt

The following players received entry from the qualifying draw:

- (United States) Murphy Cassone
- (United Kingdom) Oliver Crawford
- (Croatia) Borna Gojo
- (United Kingdom) Paul Jubb
- (United Kingdom) Johannus Monday
- (United States) Zachary Svajda

== WTA singles main draw entrants ==
=== Seeds ===
| Country | Player | Rank^{1} | Seed |
|---|---|---|---|
| PHI | Alexandra Eala | 73 | 1 |
| SUI | Viktorija Golubic | 78 | 2 |
| UKR | Yuliia Starodubtseva | 81 | 3 |
| AUS | Olivia Gadecki | 91 | 4 |
| FRA | Diane Parry | 93 | 5 |
| FRA | Léolia Jeanjean | 100 | 6 |
| CRO | Antonia Ružić | 101 | 7 |
| CAN | Rebecca Marino | 106 | 8 |

- ^{1} Rankings are as of 26 May 2025.

=== Other entrants ===
The following players received wildcards into the main draw:

- (United Kingdom) Emily Appleton
- (United Kingdom) Amarni Banks
- (United Kingdom) Ranah Stoiber
- (United Kingdom) Mingge Xu

The following player received entry using a protected ranking:

- (Croatia) Ana Konjuh

The following players received entry from the qualifying draw:

- (Australia) Lizette Cabrera
- (United Kingdom) Ella McDonald
- (Switzerland) Céline Naef
- (Japan) Kyōka Okamura
- (United Kingdom) Amelia Rajecki
- (Switzerland) Valentina Ryser

=== Withdrawals ===
- (China) Bai Zhuoxuan → replaced by (Italy) Lucrezia Stefanini
- (Romania) Sorana Cîrstea → replaced by (Switzerland) Simona Waltert
- (Australia) Maya Joint → replaced by (Ukraine) Daria Snigur
- (Thailand) Mananchaya Sawangkaew → replaced by (Japan) Sara Saito
- (Canada) Marina Stakusic → replaced by (Croatia) Ana Konjuh

== WTA doubles main draw entrants ==
=== Seeds ===
| Country | Player | Country | Player | Rank^{1} | Seed |
|---|---|---|---|---|---|
| GBR | Harriet Dart | GBR | Maia Lumsden | 141 | 1 |
| GBR | Madeleine Brooks | AUS | Petra Hule | 240 | 2 |
| NED | Isabelle Haverlag | SUI | Simona Waltert | 293 | 3 |
| GBR | Alicia Barnett | FRA | Elixane Lechemia | 302 | 4 |

- ^{1} Rankings are as of 26 May 2025.

=== Other entrants ===
The following pairs received wildcards into the doubles main draw:

- (United Kingdom) Amarni Banks / (United Kingdom) Ranah Stoiber
- (United Kingdom) Holly Hutchinson / (United Kingdom) Ella McDonald

== Champions ==
=== Men's singles ===
- (Australia) Tristan Schoolkate def. (United Kingdom) Jack Pinnington Jones 6–7^{(8–10)}, 6–4, 6–3.

=== Women's singles ===
- (United States) Iva Jovic def. (Canada) Rebecca Marino 6–1, 6–3

=== Men's doubles ===
- (Ecuador) Diego Hidalgo / (United States) Patrik Trhac def. (United Kingdom) Charles Broom / (United Kingdom) Ben Jones 6–3, 6–7^{(8–10)}, [10–7].

=== Women's doubles ===
- (Netherlands) Isabelle Haverlag / (Switzerland) Simona Waltert def. Vitalia Diatchenko / (United Kingdom) Eden Silva 6–1, 6–1
