= 2025 Ilkley Open – Men's doubles =

Men's doubles
- 2025 Ilkley Open

Final
- Champions: (Ecuador) Diego Hidalgo (United States) Patrik Trhac
- Runners-up: (United Kingdom) Charles Broom (United Kingdom) Ben Jones
- Score: 6–3, 6–7^{(8–10)}, [10–7]

Events
Singles	men	women
Doubles	men	women
← 2024 ·	Ilkley Open	· 2026 →

Evan King and Reese Stalder were the defending champions but only Stalder chose to defend his title, partnering Blake Bayldon. They lost in the first round to Niki Kaliyanda Poonacha and Jeevan Nedunchezhiyan.

Diego Hidalgo and Patrik Trhac won the title after defeating Charles Broom and Ben Jones 6–3, 6–7^{(8–10)}, [10–7] in the final.

== Seeds ==
1. (Ecuador) Diego Hidalgo / (United States) Patrik Trhac (champions)
2. (Spain) Sergio Martos Gornés / (India) Vijay Sundar Prashanth (first round)
3. (United Kingdom) Joshua Paris / (Japan) Takeru Yuzuki (semifinals)
4. (Australia) Blake Bayldon / (United States) Reese Stalder (first round)

== Draw ==
=== Key ===
- Q = Qualifier
- WC = Wild card
- LL = Lucky loser
- Alt = Alternate
- ITF = ITF entry
- PR = Protected ranking
- SR = Special ranking
- SE = Special exempt
- JE = Junior exempt
- JR = Junior Accelerator Programme entrant
- CO = College Accelerator Programme entrant
- NG = Next Gen Accelerator Program entrant
- w/o = Walkover
- r = Retired
- d = Defaulted

=== Draw ===
First round
1	(Ecuador) D Hidalgo (United States) P Trhac	6	7^{10}
(United States) C Eubanks (Hong Kong) C Wong	2	6^{8}
PR	(Switzerland) L Riedi (Japan) Y Watanuki	4	4
(India) A Chandrasekar (India) R Ramanathan	6	6
3	(United Kingdom) J Paris (Japan) T Yuzuki	6	6
(Canada) C Harper (Japan) J Trotter	3	4
(France) H Mayot (Australia) T Schoolkate	6	7^{11}
(Lithuania) E Butvilas (Spain) M Landaluce	3	6^{9}
WC	(United Kingdom) C Broom (United Kingdom) B Jones	1	7^{7}	[10]
WC	(United Kingdom) L Maxted (United Kingdom) C Thomson	6	6^{5}	[5]
(India) N Kaliyanda Poonacha (India) J Nedunchezhiyan	6	6
4	(Australia) B Bayldon (United States) R Stalder	2	4
(United Kingdom) J Monday (United Kingdom) D Stevenson	3	7	[8]
Alt	(Kazakhstan) M Kukushkin (India) D Sharan	6	5	[10]
(Lebanon) H Habib (United States) T Hilderbrand	6	7^{7}
2	(Spain) S Martos Gornés (India) VS Prashanth	4	6^{4}

Quarterfinals
1	(Ecuador) D Hidalgo (United States) P Trhac	7	6
(India) A Chandrasekar (India) R Ramanathan	5	4
3	(United Kingdom) J Paris (Japan) T Yuzuki	6	3	[10]
(France) H Mayot (Australia) T Schoolkate	4	6	[8]
WC	(United Kingdom) C Broom (United Kingdom) B Jones	6	6
(India) N Kaliyanda Poonacha (India) J Nedunchezhiyan	4	4
Alt	(Kazakhstan) M Kukushkin (India) D Sharan	7	4	[8]
(Lebanon) H Habib (United States) T Hilderbrand	5	6	[10]

Semifinals
1	(Ecuador) D Hidalgo (United States) P Trhac	7	6
3	(United Kingdom) J Paris (Japan) T Yuzuki	5	4
WC	(United Kingdom) C Broom (United Kingdom) B Jones	6	7^{7}
(Lebanon) H Habib (United States) T Hilderbrand	2	6^{3}

Final
1	(Ecuador) D Hidalgo (United States) P Trhac	6	6^{8}	[10]
WC	(United Kingdom) C Broom (United Kingdom) B Jones	3	7^{10}	[7]
