= 2026 Shimadzu All Japan Indoor Tennis Championships – Singles =

Singles
- 2026 Shimadzu All Japan Indoor Tennis Championships

Final
- Champion: (Japan) Hayu Kinoshita
- Runner-up: (Japan) Ena Shibahara
- Score: 7–5, 6–1

Events
Singles	Doubles
- Shimadzu All Japan Indoor Tennis Championships

Sara Saito was the defending champion, but lost in the first round to Ena Shibahara.

Hayu Kinoshita won the title, defeating Shibahara 7–5, 6–1 in the final.

== Seeds ==
1. (China) Zhu Lin (first round, retired)
2. (Belgium) Sofia Costoulas (first round)
3. (Australia) Taylah Preston (second round)
4. (China) Ma Yexin (semifinals)
5. (South Korea) Ku Yeon-woo (first round)
6. (United States) Claire Liu (second round)
7. (Liechtenstein) Kathinka von Deichmann (semifinals)
8. (Japan) Ena Shibahara (final)

== Draw ==
Key

- Q = Qualifier
- WC = Wild card
- LL = Lucky loser
- Alt = Alternate
- ITF = ITF entry
- PR = Protected ranking
- SR = Special ranking
- SE = Special exempt
- JE = Junior exempt
- JR = Junior Accelerator Programme entrant
- CO = College Accelerator Programme entrant
- NG = Next Gen Accelerator Program entrant
- w/o = Walkover
- r = Retired
- d = Defaulted

=== Finals ===
Semifinals
8	(Japan) Ena Shibahara	6	7^{7}
4	(China) Ma Yexin	3	6^{3}
7	(Liechtenstein) Kathinka von Deichmann	3	4
Q	(Japan) Hayu Kinoshita	6	6

Final
8	(Japan) Ena Shibahara	5	1
Q	(Japan) Hayu Kinoshita	7	6

=== Top half ===
First round
1	(China) L Zhu	6^{2}	0^{r}
(China) F Tian	7^{7}	0
(Japan) H Abe	3	1
(Japan) H Kaji	6	6
WC	(Japan) K Hayasaka	6	6
(Japan) M Kuramochi	2	1
(Japan) S Saito	3	6	3
8	(Japan) E Shibahara	6	3	6
4	(China) Y Ma	6	6
(United States) L Ma	3	4
WC	(Japan) I Yamazaki	2	6	6
LL	(Japan) S Nishimoto	6	0	2
WC	(Japan) H Kuwata	5	5
Q	(Japan) E Koike	7	7
Q	(China) Z Bai	6	5	4
6	(United States) C Liu	0	7	6

Second round
(China) F Tian	6	5	3
(Japan) H Kaji	3	7	6
WC	(Japan) K Hayasaka	6	4	3
8	(Japan) E Shibahara	4	6	6
4	(China) Y Ma	6	6
WC	(Japan) I Yamazaki	4	4
Q	(Japan) E Koike	6	7^{7}
6	(United States) C Liu	2	6^{5}

Quarterfinals
(Japan) H Kaji	6	2	6^{3}
8	(Japan) E Shibahara	2	6	7^{7}
4	(China) Y Ma	7^{8}	6
Q	(Japan) E Koike	6^{6}	4

Semifinals
8	(Japan) E Shibahara	6	7^{7}
4	(China) Y Ma	3	6^{3}

=== Bottom half ===
First round
7	(Liechtenstein) K von Deichmann	7^{7}	3	6
Q	(Japan) E Shimizu	6^{1}	6	4
(Cyprus) R Șerban	4	6	6
Q	(India) S Yamalapalli	6	1	3
Q	(China) Y Yang	6	6
(Slovakia) V Morvayová	4	2
(Japan) R Saigo	4	4
3	(Australia) T Preston	6	6
5	(South Korea) Y-w Ku	3	5
Q	(Japan) H Kinoshita	6	7
(South Korea) S-h Park	2	6	6
Q	(Japan) R Matsuda	6	3	4
Q	(Japan) N Kawaguchi	6	7
(Japan) M Yamaguchi	3	5
(Japan) K Okamura	6	7^{7}
2	(Belgium) S Costoulas	4	6^{5}

Second round
7	(Liechtenstein) K von Deichmann	3	6	6
(Cyprus) R Șerban	6	3	2
Q	(China) Y Yang	7	6^{2}	6
3	(Australia) T Preston	5	7^{7}	4
Q	(Japan) H Kinoshita	4	7	7^{9}
(South Korea) S-h Park	6	5	6^{7}
Q	(Japan) N Kawaguchi	6	6
(Japan) K Okamura	3	2

Quarterfinals
7	(Liechtenstein) K von Deichmann	7^{7}	6^{3}	6
Q	(China) Y Yang	6^{4}	7^{7}	4
Q	(Japan) H Kinoshita	6	6
Q	(Japan) N Kawaguchi	2	2

Semifinals
7	(Liechtenstein) K von Deichmann	3	4
Q	(Japan) H Kinoshita	6	6
