= 2025 Ilkley Open – Women's singles =

Women's singles
- 2025 Ilkley Open

Final
- Champion: (United States) Iva Jovic
- Runner-up: (Canada) Rebecca Marino
- Score: 6–1, 6–3

Events
Singles	men	women
Doubles	men	women
- Ilkley Trophy

Iva Jovic defeated defending champion Rebecca Marino in the final, 6–1, 6–3, to win the women's singles title at the 2025 Ilkley Open.

== Seeds ==
1. (Philippines) Alexandra Eala (quarterfinals)
2. (Switzerland) Viktorija Golubic (semifinals)
3. (Ukraine) Yuliia Starodubtseva (first round)
4. (Australia) Olivia Gadecki (first round)
5. (France) Diane Parry (quarterfinals)
6. (France) Léolia Jeanjean (first round)
7. (Croatia) Antonia Ružić (second round)
8. (Canada) Rebecca Marino (final)

== Draw ==
Key

- Q = Qualifier
- WC = Wild card
- LL = Lucky loser
- Alt = Alternate
- ITF = ITF entry
- PR = Protected ranking
- SR = Special ranking
- SE = Special exempt
- JE = Junior exempt
- JR = Junior Accelerator Programme entrant
- CO = College Accelerator Programme entrant
- NG = Next Gen Accelerator Program entrant
- w/o = Walkover
- r = Retired
- d = Defaulted

=== Finals ===
Semifinals
8	(Canada) Rebecca Marino	6	4	6
Q	(Switzerland) Céline Naef	3	6	2
(United States) Iva Jovic	6	6
2	(Switzerland) Viktorija Golubic	0	3

Final
8	(Canada) Rebecca Marino	1	3
(United States) Iva Jovic	6	6

=== Top half ===
First round
1	(Philippines) A Eala	7^{7}	6
Q	(Australia) L Cabrera	6^{4}	3
(Japan) S Saito	0	4
Q	(Switzerland) V Ryser	6	6
WC	(United Kingdom) E Appleton	3	6	6
(Switzerland) S Waltert	6	4	3
(France) J Ponchet	4	4
8	(Canada) R Marino	6	6
4	(Australia) O Gadecki	4	6^{2}
WC	(United Kingdom) A Banks	6	7^{7}
PR	(Croatia) A Konjuh	3	3
WC	(United Kingdom) M Xu	6	6
Q	(Japan) K Okamura	3	5
Q	(Switzerland) C Naef	6	7
Q	(United Kingdom) E McDonald	3	6	4
7	(Croatia) A Ružić	6	3	6

Second round
1	(Philippines) A Eala	6	6
Q	(Switzerland) V Ryser	1	2
WC	(United Kingdom) E Appleton	6	4	3
8	(Canada) R Marino	2	6	6
WC	(United Kingdom) A Banks	6	6
WC	(United Kingdom) M Xu	2	1
Q	(Switzerland) C Naef	6^{5}	6	6
7	(Croatia) A Ružić	7^{7}	1	2

Quarterfinals
1	(Philippines) A Eala	6	0	6^{4}
8	(Canada) R Marino	1	6	7^{7}
WC	(United Kingdom) A Banks	7	4	4
Q	(Switzerland) C Naef	5	6	6

Semifinals
8	(Canada) R Marino	6	4	6
Q	(Switzerland) C Naef	3	6	2

=== Bottom half ===
First round
6	(France) L Jeanjean	5	4
(United States) V Lepchenko	7	6
(Switzerland) R Masarova	6	3	4
(United States) I Jovic	3	6	6
(United States) W Osuigwe	5	2
(Australia) T Gibson	7	6
(Ukraine) D Snigur	3	6	6
3	(Ukraine) Y Starodubtseva	6	0	0
5	(France) D Parry	6	7
WC	(United Kingdom) R Stoiber	1	5
(United Kingdom) H Dart	6	6
Q	(United Kingdom) A Rajecki	4	3
(China) S Wei	4	4
(France) E Jacquemot	6	6
(Italy) L Stefanini	4	7	3
2	(Switzerland) V Golubic	6	5	6

Second round
(United States) V Lepchenko	3	7^{7}	0
(United States) I Jovic	6	6^{2}	6
(Australia) T Gibson	7	7^{7}
(Ukraine) D Snigur	5	6^{3}
5	(France) D Parry	6	7
(United Kingdom) H Dart	3	5
(France) E Jacquemot	1	6	2
2	(Switzerland) V Golubic	6	3	6

Quarterfinals
(United States) I Jovic	6	3	6
(Australia) T Gibson	3	6	3
5	(France) D Parry	1	3
2	(Switzerland) V Golubic	6	6

Semifinals
(United States) I Jovic	6	6
2	(Switzerland) V Golubic	0	3

== Qualifying ==
=== Seeds ===
1. (France) Manon Léonard (first round)
2. (Japan) Kyōka Okamura (qualified)
3. (Switzerland) Céline Naef (qualified)
4. (Poland) Linda Klimovičová (qualifying competition)
5. (Japan) Sayaka Ishii (qualifying competition)
6. (Australia) Lizette Cabrera (qualified)
7. (Canada) Kayla Cross (qualifying competition)
8. (Switzerland) Leonie Küng (first round)
9. (Switzerland) Valentina Ryser (qualified)
10. (China) Shi Han (qualifying competition)
11. (Japan) Himeno Sakatsume (qualifying competition)
12. (Sweden) Kajsa Rinaldo Persson (first round)

=== Qualifiers ===
1. (United Kingdom) Ella McDonald
2. (Japan) Kyōka Okamura
3. (Switzerland) Céline Naef
4. (United Kingdom) Amelia Rajecki
5. (Switzerland) Valentina Ryser
6. (Australia) Lizette Cabrera

=== Qualifying draw ===
==== First qualifier ====
First round
1	(France) Manon Léonard	3	4
(United Kingdom) Ella McDonald	6	6
(United Kingdom) Naiktha Bains	4	6	1
10	(China) Shi Han	6	2	6

Qualifying competition
(United Kingdom) Ella McDonald	6	6
10	(China) Shi Han	3	1

==== Second qualifier ====
First round
2	(Japan) Kyōka Okamura	3	6	7
Vitalia Diatchenko	6	3	5
(United States) Kayla Day	4	5
11	(Japan) Himeno Sakatsume	6	7

Qualifying competition
2	(Japan) Kyōka Okamura	6	2	7
11	(Japan) Himeno Sakatsume	4	6	5

==== Third qualifier ====
First round
3	(Switzerland) Céline Naef	6	6
WC	(United Kingdom) Ruby Cooling	4	2
WC	(United Kingdom) Freya Christie	2	4
7	(Canada) Kayla Cross	6	6

Qualifying competition
3	(Switzerland) Céline Naef	6	3	7
7	(Canada) Kayla Cross	1	6	5

==== Fourth qualifier ====
First round
4	(Poland) Linda Klimovičová	6	6
(Australia) Petra Hule	4	3
(United Kingdom) Amelia Rajecki	6	6
12	(Sweden) Kajsa Rinaldo Persson	3	2

Qualifying competition
4	(Poland) Linda Klimovičová	7^{9}	6^{5}	3
(United Kingdom) Amelia Rajecki	6^{7}	7^{7}	6

==== Fifth qualifier ====
First round
5	(Japan) Sayaka Ishii	6	1	6
(United States) Alana Smith	1	6	2
WC	(United Kingdom) Allegra Korpanec Davies	0	2
9	(Switzerland) Valentina Ryser	6	6

Qualifying competition
5	(Japan) Sayaka Ishii	4	5
9	(Switzerland) Valentina Ryser	6	7

==== Sixth qualifier ====
First round
6	(Australia) Lizette Cabrera	6	6
WC	(United Kingdom) Flora Johnson	2	2
(Czech Republic) Tereza Martincová	6	6
8	(Switzerland) Leonie Küng	4	1

Qualifying competition
6	(Australia) Lizette Cabrera	6	7
(Czech Republic) Tereza Martincová	1	5
