= 2026 Ilkley Open – Women's doubles =

Women's doubles
- 2026 Ilkley Open

Final
- Champions: (United Kingdom) Freya Christie (United Kingdom) Eden Silva
- Runners-up: (United Kingdom) Madeleine Brooks (United Kingdom) Amelia Rajecki
- Score: 1–6, 6–4, [10–7]

Events
Singles	men	women
Doubles	men	women
- Ilkley Open

Isabelle Haverlag and Simona Waltert were the reigning champions but Waltert did not participate and Haverlag chose to compete in s'Hertogenbosch instead.

Freya Christie and Eden Silva won the title, defeating Madeleine Brooks and Amelia Rajecki 1–6, 6–4, [10–7] in the final.

== Seeds ==
1. Maria Kozyreva / Iryna Shymanovich (first round)
2. (United Kingdom) Emily Appleton / Elena Pridankina (quarterfinals)
3. (China) Feng Shuo / (Japan) Momoko Kobori (first round)
4. (United Kingdom) Madeleine Brooks / (United Kingdom) Amelia Rajecki (final)

== Draw ==
Key

- Q = Qualifier
- WC = Wild card
- LL = Lucky loser
- Alt = Alternate
- ITF = ITF entry
- PR = Protected ranking
- SR = Special ranking
- SE = Special exempt
- JE = Junior exempt
- JR = Junior Accelerator Programme entrant
- CO = College Accelerator Programme entrant
- NG = Next Gen Accelerator Program entrant
- w/o = Walkover
- r = Retired
- d = Defaulted

First round
1	M Kozyreva; I Shymanovich	6	3	[9]
(Australia) E Jones (Ukraine) V Podrez	4	6	[11]
(United Kingdom) E Adeshina (United Kingdom) V Allen	5	2
(Czech Republic) L Fruhvirtová; A Korneeva	7	6
3	(China) S Feng (Japan) M Kobori	1	6	[6]
(United Kingdom) A Barnett (United Kingdom) S Murray Sharan	6	2	[10]
(United Kingdom) F Christie (United Kingdom) E Silva	4	6	[10]
(Canada) K Cross (United Kingdom) E McDonald	6	2	[5]
(Austria) S Kraus (Czech Republic) V Valdmannová
Alt	(United Kingdom) K Swan (Czech Republic) D Vidmanova	w/o
(United States) I Corley (United States) C Ngounoue	5	6	[7]
4	(United Kingdom) M Brooks (United Kingdom) A Rajecki	7	0	[10]
(United States) C Harrison (Australia) A Osborne	7	6
(Japan) H Kuwata (Thailand) M Sawangkaew	5	4
WC	(United Kingdom) A Dudeney (United Kingdom) M Xu	4	4
2	(United Kingdom) E Appleton; E Pridankina	6	6

Quarterfinals
(Australia) E Jones (Ukraine) V Podrez	4	6	[8]
(Czech Republic) L Fruhvirtová; A Korneeva	6	4	[10]
(United Kingdom) A Barnett (United Kingdom) S Murray Sharan	4	2
(United Kingdom) F Christie (United Kingdom) E Silva	6	6
Alt	(United Kingdom) K Swan (Czech Republic) D Vidmanova	4	6	[8]
4	(United Kingdom) M Brooks (United Kingdom) A Rajecki	6	3	[10]
(United States) C Harrison (Australia) A Osborne	7^{9}	2	[10]
2	(United Kingdom) E Appleton; E Pridankina	6^{7}	6	[4]

Semifinals
(Czech Republic) L Fruhvirtová; A Korneeva	4	4
(United Kingdom) F Christie (United Kingdom) E Silva	6	6
4	(United Kingdom) M Brooks (United Kingdom) A Rajecki	3	6	[10]
(United States) C Harrison (Australia) A Osborne	6	0	[6]

Final
(United Kingdom) F Christie (United Kingdom) E Silva	1	6	[10]
4	(United Kingdom) M Brooks (United Kingdom) A Rajecki	6	4	[7]
