= 2025 Ilkley Open – Men's singles =

Men's singles
- 2025 Ilkley Open

Final
- Champion: (Australia) Tristan Schoolkate
- Runner-up: (United Kingdom) Jack Pinnington Jones
- Score: 6–7^{(8–10)}, 6–4, 6–3

Events
Singles	men	women
Doubles	men	women
← 2024 ·	Ilkley Open	· 2026 →

David Goffin was the defending champion but chose not to defend his title.

Tristan Schoolkate won the title after defeating Jack Pinnington Jones 6–7^{(8–10)}, 6–4, 6–3 in the final.

== Seeds ==
1. (Poland) Kamil Majchrzak (first round)
2. (United States) Brandon Holt (first round)
3. (United Kingdom) Billy Harris (second round)
4. (Croatia) Marin Čilić (second round)
5. (United States) Christopher Eubanks (first round)
6. (France) Térence Atmane (first round)
7. (Australia) Tristan Schoolkate (champion)
8. (Spain) Martín Landaluce (quarterfinals)

== Draw ==
=== Key ===
- Q = Qualifier
- WC = Wild card
- LL = Lucky loser
- Alt = Alternate
- ITF = ITF entry
- PR = Protected ranking
- SR = Special ranking
- SE = Special exempt
- JE = Junior exempt
- JR = Junior Accelerator Programme entrant
- CO = College Accelerator Programme entrant
- NG = Next Gen Accelerator Program entrant
- w/o = Walkover
- r = Retired
- d = Defaulted

=== Finals ===
Semifinals
7	(Australia) Tristan Schoolkate	6	7^{8}
Q	(United States) Zachary Svajda	4	6^{6}
WC	(United Kingdom) Jack Pinnington Jones	7^{7}	6
(Japan) Shintaro Mochizuki	6^{5}	4

Final
7	(Australia) Tristan Schoolkate	6^{8}	6	6
WC	(United Kingdom) Jack Pinnington Jones	7^{10}	4	3

=== Top half ===
First round
1	(Poland) K Majchrzak	4	4
(Japan) S Shimabukuro	6	6
(Japan) J Trotter	6	6
(Luxembourg) C Rodesch	1	4
WC	(United Kingdom) H Searle	6	6
(Hong Kong) C Wong	3	2
(France) H Mayot	6	5	5
7	(Australia) T Schoolkate	3	7	7
4	(Croatia) M Čilić	6	7^{8}
Q	(United Kingdom) P Jubb	3	6^{6}
Alt	(Australia) A Bolt	7^{7}	6^{5}	5
Q	(United States) Z Svajda	6^{5}	7^{7}	7
PR	(Switzerland) L Riedi	6	6
WC	(United Kingdom) J Clarke	3	2
Q	(United States) M Cassone	6	6
5	(United States) C Eubanks	4	3

Second round
(Japan) S Shimabukuro	6	4	6
(Japan) J Trotter	3	6	4
WC	(United Kingdom) H Searle	6	1	4
7	(Australia) T Schoolkate	2	6	6
4	(Croatia) M Čilić	3	4
Q	(United States) Z Svajda	6	6
PR	(Switzerland) L Riedi	6	6
Q	(United States) M Cassone	4	3

Quarterfinals
(Japan) S Shimabukuro	6	3	6^{4}
7	(Australia) T Schoolkate	3	6	7^{7}
Q	(United States) Z Svajda	7^{10}	4	7
PR	(Switzerland) L Riedi	6^{8}	6	5

Semifinals
7	(Australia) T Schoolkate	6	7^{8}
Q	(United States) Z Svajda	4	6^{6}

=== Bottom half ===
First round
8	(Spain) M Landaluce	6	6^{3}	6
(Lebanon) H Habib	4	7^{7}	3
(France) U Blanchet	2	2
PR	(South Africa) L Harris	6	6
(Kazakhstan) M Kukushkin	2	5
WC	(United Kingdom) J Pinnington Jones	6	7
Q	(Croatia) B Gojo	2	3
3	(United Kingdom) B Harris	6	6
6	(France) T Atmane	6^{4}	3
Q	(United Kingdom) J Monday	7^{7}	6
(Japan) S Mochizuki	6	3	6
SE	(United States) C Smith	4	6	2
(United States) J Brooksby	7^{7}	6
(Japan) Y Watanuki	6^{5}	3
Q	(United Kingdom) O Crawford	6	6^{2}	7^{7}
2	(United States) B Holt	3	7^{7}	6^{5}

Second round
8	(Spain) M Landaluce	6	6
PR	(South Africa) L Harris	3	0
WC	(United Kingdom) J Pinnington Jones	7^{7}	4	6
3	(United Kingdom) B Harris	6^{4}	6	3
Q	(United Kingdom) J Monday	4	7^{7}	3
(Japan) S Mochizuki	6	6^{5}	6
(United States) J Brooksby	4	5
Q	(United Kingdom) O Crawford	6	7

Quarterfinals
8	(Spain) M Landaluce	5	2
WC	(United Kingdom) J Pinnington Jones	7	6
(Japan) S Mochizuki	6	6
Q	(United Kingdom) O Crawford	4	2

Semifinals
WC	(United Kingdom) J Pinnington Jones	7^{7}	6
(Japan) S Mochizuki	6^{5}	4
