= 2026 Ilkley Open – Women's singles =

Women's singles
- 2026 Ilkley Open

Final
- Champion: (United States) Ashlyn Krueger
- Runner-up: (Switzerland) Céline Naef
- Score: 7–5, 6–2

Events
Singles	men	women
Doubles	men	women
- Ilkley Trophy

Iva Jovic was the reigning champion, but chose to compete at Queen's Club instead.

Ashlyn Krueger won the title after defeating Céline Naef 7–5, 6–2 in the final.

== Seeds ==
1. (Switzerland) Viktorija Golubic (second round)
2. (Thailand) Lanlana Tararudee (second round)
3. (Austria) Sinja Kraus (second round)
4. (Czech Republic) Darja Vidmanova (semifinals)
5. (New Zealand) Lulu Sun (second round)
6. (Hungary) Dalma Gálfi (second round)
7. Alina Korneeva (first round)
8. (United States) Ashlyn Krueger (champion)

== Draw ==
Key

- Q = Qualifier
- WC = Wild card
- LL = Lucky loser
- Alt = Alternate
- ITF = ITF entry
- PR = Protected ranking
- SR = Special ranking
- SE = Special exempt
- JE = Junior exempt
- JR = Junior Accelerator Programme entrant
- CO = College Accelerator Programme entrant
- NG = Next Gen Accelerator Program entrant
- w/o = Walkover
- r = Retired
- d = Defaulted

=== Finals ===
Semifinals
8	(United States) Ashlyn Krueger	6	3	6
4	(Czech Republic) Darja Vidmanova	4	6	4
(United States) Mary Stoiana	6	3	4
Q	(Switzerland) Céline Naef	1	6	6

Final
8	(United States) Ashlyn Krueger	7	6
Q	(Switzerland) Céline Naef	5	2

=== Top half ===
First round
1	(Switzerland) V Golubic	6	6
WC	(United Kingdom) D Britton	3	3
Q	(Czech Republic) T Martincová	5	2
WC	(United Kingdom) K Swan	7	6
WC	(United Kingdom) A Dudeney	6	6
(Japan) H Sakatsume	4	3
(United States) E Kalieva	2	2
8	(United States) A Krueger	6	6
4	(Czech Republic) D Vidmanova	6^{6}	7^{12}	6
(Czech Republic) L Fruhvirtová	7^{8}	6^{10}	2
(Italy) L Stefanini	6	6
Q	(Czech Republic) V Valdmannová	4	3
WC	(United Kingdom) M Xu	6	4	1
(United States) E Mandlik	4	6	6
(Australia) E Jones	6^{6}	7^{7}	5
6	(Hungary) D Gálfi	7^{8}	6^{2}	7

Second round
1	(Switzerland) V Golubic	4	6^{5}
WC	(United Kingdom) K Swan	6	7^{7}
WC	(United Kingdom) A Dudeney	4	6	2
8	(United States) A Krueger	6	3	6
4	(Czech Republic) D Vidmanova	6	6
(Italy) L Stefanini	2	1
(United States) E Mandlik	6	6
6	(Hungary) D Gálfi	4	4

Quarterfinals
WC	(United Kingdom) K Swan	1	0^{r}
8	(United States) A Krueger	6	0
4	(Czech Republic) D Vidmanova	6^{2}	6	7^{7}
(United States) E Mandlik	7^{7}	3	6^{2}

Semifinals
8	(United States) A Krueger	6	3	6
4	(Czech Republic) D Vidmanova	4	6	4

=== Bottom half ===
First round
5	(New Zealand) L Sun	2	6	6
Q	(United Kingdom) E McDonald	6	2	2
(United States) K Day	5	4
(United States) M Stoiana	7	6
(Ukraine) V Podrez	4	2
T Prozorova	6	6
(Poland) L Klimovičová	2	3
3	(Austria) S Kraus	6	6
7	A Korneeva	4	5
Q	(Switzerland) C Naef	6	7
(Thailand) M Sawangkaew	6^{3}	0
(United States) A Urhobo	7^{7}	6
(Australia) T Preston	6	3	1
Q	(France) H Tan	4	6	6
Q	I Shymanovich	6^{6}	6^{5}
2	(Thailand) L Tararudee	7^{8}	7^{7}

Second round
5	(New Zealand) L Sun	2	3
(United States) M Stoiana	6	6
T Prozorova	6	6
3	(Austria) S Kraus	4	3
Q	(Switzerland) C Naef	6	6
(United States) A Urhobo	3	4
Q	(France) H Tan	6	7^{7}
2	(Thailand) L Tararudee	2	6^{3}

Quarterfinals
(United States) M Stoiana	7	6
T Prozorova	5	1
Q	(Switzerland) C Naef	7^{8}	6
Q	(France) H Tan	6^{6}	3

Semifinals
(United States) M Stoiana	6	3	4
Q	(Switzerland) C Naef	1	6	6

== Qualifying ==
=== Seeds ===
1. Iryna Shymanovich (qualified)
2. (Canada) Kayla Cross (qualifying competition)
3. (Czech Republic) Vendula Valdmannová (qualified)
4. (Switzerland) Céline Naef (qualified)
5. Elena Pridankina (first round)
6. (France) Harmony Tan (qualified)
7. (Czech Republic) Tereza Martincová (qualified)
8. (United States) Clervie Ngounoue (qualifying competition)
9. (Japan) Momoko Kobori (qualifying competition)
10. (United Kingdom) Naiktha Bains (first round)
11. (United Kingdom) Emily Appleton (qualifying competition)
12. (United Kingdom) Victoria Allen (first round)

=== Qualifiers ===
1. Iryna Shymanovich
2. (Czech Republic) Tereza Martincová
3. (Czech Republic) Vendula Valdmannová
4. (Switzerland) Céline Naef
5. (United Kingdom) Ella McDonald
6. (France) Harmony Tan

=== Qualifying draw ===
==== First qualifier ====
First round
1	Iryna Shymanovich	6	6
WC	(United Kingdom) Savannah Dada-Mascoll	0	4
Maria Kozyreva	6^{1}	2
8	(United States) Clervie Ngounoue	7^{7}	6

Qualifying competition
1	Iryna Shymanovich	6	6
8	(United States) Clervie Ngounoue	3	3

==== Second qualifier ====
First round
2	(Canada) Kayla Cross	6	6
WC	(United Kingdom) Megan Knight	1	1
(United Kingdom) Brooke Black	4	1
7	(Czech Republic) Tereza Martincová	6	6

Qualifying competition
2	(Canada) Kayla Cross	3	4
7	(Czech Republic) Tereza Martincová	6	6

==== Third qualifier ====
First round
3	(Czech Republic) Vendula Valdmannová	6	6
(Japan) Sayaka Ishii	3	1
WC	(United Kingdom) Edie Griffiths	2	7^{11}	7
10	(United Kingdom) Naiktha Bains	6	6^{9}	5

Qualifying competition
3	(Czech Republic) Vendula Valdmannová	6	6
WC	(United Kingdom) Edie Griffiths	2	2

==== Fourth qualifier ====
First round
4	(Switzerland) Céline Naef	6	6
(Japan) Hiroko Kuwata	1	4
(United Kingdom) Katy Dunne	5	2
9	(Japan) Momoko Kobori	7	6

Qualifying competition
4	(Switzerland) Céline Naef	7	7
9	(Japan) Momoko Kobori	5	5

==== Fifth qualifier ====
First round
5	Elena Pridankina	6	1	4
(United Kingdom) Ella McDonald	1	6	6
(United Kingdom) Ranah Stoiber	6	6
12	(United Kingdom) Victoria Allen	3	4

Qualifying competition
(United Kingdom) Ella McDonald	6	6
(United Kingdom) Ranah Stoiber	2	4

==== Sixth qualifier ====
First round
6	(France) Harmony Tan	6	6
(United Kingdom) Amelia Rajecki	4	4
(United Kingdom) Tegan Bush	6	1	2
11	(United Kingdom) Emily Appleton	3	6	6

Qualifying competition
6	(France) Harmony Tan	7	6
11	(United Kingdom) Emily Appleton	5	3
