= 2026 Jingshan Tennis Open – Men's doubles =

Men's doubles
- 2026 Jingshan Tennis Open

Final
- Champions: (Ecuador) Gonzalo Escobar (India) Niki Kaliyanda Poonacha
- Runners-up: (Mexico) Miguel Ángel Reyes-Varela (United States) Reese Stalder
- Score: 7–5, 6–2

Events
Singles	men	women
Doubles	men	women
- Jingshan Tennis Open

Anirudh Chandrasekar and Reese Stalder were the defending champions but only Stalder chose to defend his title, partnering Miguel Ángel Reyes-Varela. He lost in the final to Gonzalo Escobar and Niki Kaliyanda Poonacha.

Escobar and Kaliyanda Poonacha won the title after defeating Reyes-Varela and Stalder 7–5, 6–2 in the final.

== Seeds ==
1. (United States) Ryan Seggerman / (Netherlands) Bart Stevens (semifinals)
2. (United States) Nathaniel Lammons / (United States) Jackson Withrow (semifinals)
3. (Mexico) Miguel Ángel Reyes-Varela / (United States) Reese Stalder (final)
4. (Ecuador) Gonzalo Escobar / (India) Niki Kaliyanda Poonacha (champions)

== Draw ==
Key

- Q = Qualifier
- WC = Wild card
- LL = Lucky loser
- Alt = Alternate
- ITF = ITF entry
- PR = Protected ranking
- SR = Special ranking
- SE = Special exempt
- JE = Junior exempt
- JR = Junior Accelerator Programme entrant
- CO = College Accelerator Programme entrant
- NG = Next Gen Accelerator Program entrant
- w/o = Walkover
- r = Retired
- d = Defaulted

First round
1	(United States) R Seggerman (Netherlands) B Stevens	7^{7}	6
(Australia) B Bayldon (Australia) C Puttergill	6^{2}	3
(Australia) T Fancutt (Australia) B Tomic	6^{5}	6	[6]
(Australia) A Bolt (Australia) A Walton	7^{7}	3	[10]
4	(Ecuador) G Escobar (India) N Kaliyanda Poonacha	6	6
WC	(China) Xia Zhiheng (China) Zeng Yaojie	1	1
P Bar Biryukov (Kazakhstan) G Lomakin	5	4
(Malaysia) Mitsuki Wei Kang Leong (Greece) S Sakellaridis	7	6
(India) S Banthia (New Zealand) A Rai	1	2
(France) A Müller (France) L Pavlovic	6	6
(Japan) M Imamura (Japan) N Tajima	6	1	[6]
3	(Mexico) M Reyes-Varela (United States) R Stalder	4	6	[10]
(South Africa) L Harris (Chinese Taipei) C-p Hsieh	6^{5}	7	[10]
(Turkey) Y Erel; I Liutarevich	7^{7}	5	[6]
S Betov; M Sharipov	5	2
2	(United States) N Lammons (United States) J Withrow	7	6

Quarterfinals
1	(United States) R Seggerman (Netherlands) B Stevens	w/o
(Australia) A Bolt (Australia) A Walton
4	(Ecuador) G Escobar (India) N Kaliyanda Poonacha	w/o
(Malaysia) MWK Leong (Greece) S Sakellaridis
(France) A Müller (France) L Pavlovic
3	(Mexico) M Reyes-Varela (United States) R Stalder	w/o
(South Africa) L Harris (Chinese Taipei) C-p Hsieh
2	(United States) N Lammons (United States) J Withrow	w/o

Semifinals
1	(United States) R Seggerman (Netherlands) B Stevens	7^{7}	5	[5]
4	(Ecuador) G Escobar (India) N Kaliyanda Poonacha	6^{4}	7	[10]
3	(Mexico) M Reyes-Varela (United States) R Stalder	5	7	[10]
2	(United States) N Lammons (United States) J Withrow	7	5	[8]

Final
4	(Ecuador) G Escobar (India) N Kaliyanda Poonacha	7	6
3	(Mexico) M Reyes-Varela (United States) R Stalder	5	2
