= Jingshan Tennis Open =

Tennis tournament in China

- 2026 Jingshan Tennis Open

Tournament information
- Event name: HuBei Bank Jingshan Tennis Open (2025)
- Location: Jingshan, China
- Venue: Jingshan International Tennis Tournament Center
- Surface: Hard
- Draw: 32S/16Q/16D
- Prize money: $177,000 (men) $115,000 (women)

Current champions (2026)
- Men's singles: (South Africa) Lloyd Harris
- Women's singles: Alexandra Shubladze
- Men's doubles: (Ecuador) Gonzalo Escobar (India) Niki Kaliyanda Poonacha
- Women's doubles: (United Kingdom) Madeleine Brooks (United Kingdom) Amelia Rajecki
ATP Tour
- Category: ATP Challenger 100
WTA Tour
- Category: WTA 125

The Jingshan Tennis Open (Chinese: 京山网球公开赛; pinyin: Jīngshān Wǎngqiú Gōngkāi Sài) is a tournament for professional tennis players played on outdoor hardcourts. The event is classified as a WTA 125 and an ATP Challenger Tour tournament and is held at the Jingshan International Tennis Tournament Center in Jingshan, Hubei, China.

== Past finals ==
=== Women's singles ===
Year	Champion	Runner-up	Score
2026	Alexandra Shubladze	(Spain) Jéssica Bouzas Maneiro	6–3, 6–2
2025	(New Zealand) Lulu Sun	(China) Ma Yexin	6–4, 6–2

=== Women's doubles ===
Year	Champions	Runners-up	Score
2026	(United Kingdom) Madeleine Brooks (United Kingdom) Amelia Rajecki	Sofya Lansere; Alexandra Shubladze	6–7^{(5–7)}, 7–6^{(7–1)}, [10–6]
2025	(Hong Kong) Eudice Chong (Chinese Taipei) Liang En-shuo	(Chinese Taipei) Lee Ya-hsin (Hong Kong) Cody Wong Hong-yi	7–6^{(7–4)}, 6–2

=== Men's singles ===
Year	Champion	Runner-up	Score
2026	(South Africa) Lloyd Harris	(Italy) Mattia Bellucci	1–6, 6–3, 7–6^{(7–4)}
2025	(United States) Eliot Spizzirri	(Australia) Alex Bolt	6–4, 6–4

=== Men's doubles ===
Year	Champions	Runners-up	Score
2026	(Ecuador) Gonzalo Escobar (India) Niki Kaliyanda Poonacha	(Mexico) Miguel Ángel Reyes-Varela (United States) Reese Stalder	7–5, 6–2
2025	(India) Anirudh Chandrasekar (United States) Reese Stalder	(Chinese Taipei) Huang Tsung-hao (South Korea) Park Ui-sung	6–2, 2–6, [10–7]
