= Alexandra Shubladze =

Russian tennis player (born 2005)

- Shubladze at the 2026 Wimbledon Championships
- Full name: Alexandra Alexandrovna Shubladze
- Country (sports): Russia
- Born: 6 September 2005 (age 21) Rostov-on-Don, Russia
- Plays: Right-handed
- Prize money: $188,024

Singles
- Career record: 184–60
- Career titles: 1 WTA 125
- Highest ranking: No. 127 (9 November 2026)
- Current ranking: No. 127 (9 November 2026)

Grand Slam singles results
- Wimbledon: Q1 (2026)
- US Open: Q2 (2026)

Doubles
- Career record: 81–34
- Career titles: 9 ITF
- Highest ranking: No. 223 (19 October 2026)
- Current ranking: No. 225 (9 November 2026)
- Last updated on: 9 November 2026.

Alexandra Alexandrovna Shubladze (Russian: Александра Александровна Шубладзе, born 6 September 2005) is a Russian tennis player. She has career-high WTA rankings of No. 127 in singles, achieved on 9 November 2026 and No. 223 in doubles, achieved on 19 October 2026.

Shubladze has won one WTA 125 title.

== Career ==
=== 2022-2025: Turned pro, first ITF titles ===
Starting in 2022, Shubladze began building her career on the Junior Circuit and lower-level ITF World Tour. In 2023, she won her first professional singles titles, claiming three W15 tournaments in Tbilisi, Fiano Romano and Sharm El Sheikh. In 2024, she captured two more singles titles and reached the final of the ITF tournament in Guiyang, China. In 2025, she won three ITF singles titles including tournaments in Kuršumlijska Banja, Reims and Istanbul.

=== 2026: First WTA 125 title, WTA Tour debut semifinal ===
She won her first WTA 125 singles title at Jingshan Open, defeating Jéssica Bouzas Maneiro in the final.

== WTA 125 finals ==
=== Singles: 1 (title) ===
Result	W–L	Date	Tournament	Surface	Opponent	Score
Win	1–0	Sep 2026	Jingshan Open, China	Hard	(Spain) Jéssica Bouzas Maneiro	6–3, 6–2

=== Doubles: 2 (runner-ups) ===
Result	W–L	Date	Tournament	Surface	Partner	Opponents	Score
Loss	0–1	Jul 2026	ENKA Ladies Open, Turkey	Hard	Tatiana Prozorova	(Japan) Ena Shibahara; Vera Zvonareva	3–6, 6–3, [8–10]
Loss	0–2	Sep 2026	Jingshan Tennis Open, China	Hard	Sofya Lansere	(United Kingdom) Madeleine Brooks (United Kingdom) Amelia Rajecki	7–6^{(7–5)}, 6–7^{(1–7)}, [6–10]

== ITF Circuit finals ==
=== Singles: 18 (13 titles, 5 runner-ups) ===
Legend W75 tournaments W50 tournaments W35 tournaments W15 tournaments	Finals by surface Hard (8–2) Clay (5–3)

Result	W–L	Date	Tournament	Tier	Surface	Opponent	Score
Loss	0–1	Jan 2023	ITF Antalya, Turkiye	W15	Clay	(Ukraine) Anastasiya Soboleva	2–6, 1–6
Win	1–1	Aug 2023	ITF Tbilisi, Georgia	W15	Hard	(Cyprus) Daria Frayman	6–4, 6–3
Win	2–1	Sep 2023	ITF Fiano Romano, Italy	W15	Clay	(Italy) Enola Chiesa	6–7^{(5)}, 6–2, 6–1
Win	3–1	Oct 2023	ITF Sharm El Sheikh, Egypt	W15	Hard	Ekaterina Shalimova	6–3, 7–5
Win	4–1	Apr 2024	Antalya, Turkiye	W15	Clay	(Germany) Chantal Sauvant	6–2, 6–1
Win	5–1	Jun 2024	ITF Kuršumlijska Banja, Serbia	W15	Clay	(Serbia) Natalija Senić	6–2, 1–0 ret.
Loss	5–2	Jul 2024	President's Cup, Kazakhstan	W35	Hard	Tatiana Prozorova	5–7, 7–6^{(5)}, 1–6
Loss	5–3	Sep 2024	ITF Guiyang, China	W50	Hard	(United States) Hina Inoue	6–7^{(4)}, 1–6
Loss	5–4	Jun 2025	ITF Kuršumlijska Banja, Serbia	W15	Clay	Anastasia Zolotareva	5–7, 6–2, 5–7
Win	6–4	Aug 2025	ITF Kuršumlijska Banja, Serbia	W15	Clay	(Denmark) Rebecca Mortensen	6–1, 6–4
Win	7–4	Oct 2025	ITF Reims, France	W35	Hard (i)	(Ukraine) Veronika Podrez	6–4, 6–4
Win	8–4	Nov 2025	ITF Istanbul, Turkiye	W35	Hard	(Croatia) Lea Bošković	6–2, 6–2
Win	9–4	Feb 2026	ITF Antalya, Turkiye	W35	Clay	(Argentina) Luisina Giovannini	6–4, 6–4
Loss	9–5	Apr 2026	Kunming Open, China	W35	Clay	Anastasia Zolotareva	6–2, 2–6, 6–7^{(5)}
Win	10–5	Apr 2026	ITF Lopota, Georgia	W75	Hard	(United States) Vivian Wolff	6–3, 6–1
Win	11–5	May 2026	ITF Wuning, China	W35	Hard	(China) Yang Yidi	6–2, 6–3
Win	12–5	May 2026	ITF Wuning, China	W35	Hard	(United States) Hina Inoue	6–4, 6–1
Win	13–5	Sep 2026	ITF Guiyang, China	W50	Hard	(China) Ren Yufei	6–2, 6–3

=== Doubles: 13 (9 titles, 4 runner-ups) ===
Legend W50 tournaments (2–1) W25/35 tournaments (2–1) W15 tournaments (5–2)	Finals by surface Hard (1–3) Clay (8–1)

Result	W–L	Date	Tournament	Tier	Surface	Partner	Opponents	Score
Win	1–0	May 2023	ITF Antalya, Turkiye	W15	Clay	Alevtina Ibragimova	(Turkey) Leyla Elmas (Turkey) Başak Eraydın	6–4, 1–6, [10–3]
Loss	1–1	Nov 2023	ITF Sharm El Sheikh, Egypt	W15	Hard	(Austria) Tamara Kostic	(Serbia) Darja Suvirdjonkova; Daria Zelinskaya	5–7, 6–2, [11–13]
Win	2–1	Jan 2024	ITF Antalya, Turkiye	W50	Clay	Anastasiia Gureva	(Spain) Ángela Fita Boluda (Latvia) Daniela Vismane	6–3, 6–2
Win	3–1	Jun 2024	ITF Kuršumlijska Banja, Serbia	W15	Clay	Ksenia Laskutova	(Australia) Kaylah McPhee (Poland) Zuzanna Pawlikowska	6–4, 7–5
Loss	3–2	Jun 2024	ITF Kuršumlijska Banja	W15	Hard	Ksenia Laskutova	(Serbia) Natalija Senić (Serbia) Anja Stanković	6–7^{(5)}, 6–7^{(4)}
Loss	3–3	Apr 2025	ITF Lopota, Georgia	W50	Hard	(India) Shrivalli Bhamidipaty	(India) Rutuja Bhosale (New Zealand) Paige Hourigan	3–6, 2–6
Win	4–3	Jun 2025	ITF Kuršumlijska Banja	W15	Clay	Anastasia Zolotareva	Alina Yuneva; Valeriya Yushchenko	6–3, 6–2
Win	5–3	Aug 2025	ITF Kuršumlijska Banja	W15	Clay	Sofya Lansere	Ekaterina Agureeva (Moldova) Eva Zabolotnaia	6–1, 6–2
Win	6–3	Aug 2025	ITF Kuršumlijska Banja	W35	Clay	Ksenia Zaytseva	(Germany) Katharina Hobgarski (Greece) Martha Matoula	6–2, 6–1
Win	7–3	Sep 2025	ITF Kuršumlijska Banja	W15	Clay	Rada Zolotareva	Felitsata Dorofeeva-Rybas (Serbia) Lana Virc	6–2, 6–2
Loss	7–4	Jan 2026	ITF Antalya, Turkiye	W35	Clay	Daria Lodikova	(Croatia) Lucija Ćirić Bagarić (Italy) Francesca Pace	6–4, 3–6, [10–12]
Win	8–4	Mar 2026	ITF Maanshan, China	W50	Hard (i)	Sofya Lansere	(Chinese Taipei) Lee Ya-hsin (Hong Kong) Cody Wong	7–6^{(6)}, 6–2
Win	9–4	Apr 2026	Kunming Open, China	W35	Clay	Sofya Lansere	(South Korea) Shin Ji-ho (Uzbekistan) Sevil Yuldasheva	7–6^{(4)}, 6–1
