= 2026 Ilkley Open – Men's singles =

Men's singles
- 2026 Ilkley Open

Final
- Champion: (China) Bu Yunchaokete
- Runner-up: (United Kingdom) Jacob Fearnley
- Score: 6–3, 7–6^{(7–1)}

Events
Singles	men	women
Doubles	men	women
- Ilkley Open

Tristan Schoolkate was the defending champion but lost in the second round to Oliver Tarvet.

Bu Yunchaokete won the title after defeating Jacob Fearnley 6–3, 7–6^{(7–1)} in the final.

== Seeds ==
1. (Portugal) Henrique Rocha (second round)
2. (Switzerland) Leandro Riedi (second round, withdrew)
3. (Norway) Nicolai Budkov Kjær (first round)
4. (Australia) Tristan Schoolkate (second round)
5. (United Kingdom) Jacob Fearnley (final)
6. (Italy) Francesco Maestrelli (first round)
7. (Australia) Dane Sweeny (semifinals)
8. (United Kingdom) Jack Pinnington Jones (second round)

== Draw ==
Key

- Q = Qualifier
- WC = Wild card
- LL = Lucky loser
- Alt = Alternate
- ITF = ITF entry
- PR = Protected ranking
- SR = Special ranking
- SE = Special exempt
- JE = Junior exempt
- JR = Junior Accelerator Programme entrant
- CO = College Accelerator Programme entrant
- NG = Next Gen Accelerator Program entrant
- w/o = Walkover
- r = Retired
- d = Defaulted

=== Finals ===
Semifinals
5	(United Kingdom) Jacob Fearnley	6	6^{4}	6
Q	(Italy) Filippo Romano	3	7^{7}	4
7	(Australia) Dane Sweeny	6^{4}	6^{6}
Alt	(China) Bu Yunchaokete	7^{7}	7^{8}

Final
5	(United Kingdom) Jacob Fearnley	3	6^{1}
Alt	(China) Bu Yunchaokete	6	7^{7}

=== Top half ===
First round
1	(Portugal) H Rocha	6	6
Q	(United Kingdom) C Broom	2	2
NG	(United States) Dar Blanch	7^{7}	4	6
(Australia) C O'Connell	6^{4}	6	3
(Australia) A Bolt	4	4
Q	(United States) K Smith	6	6
(Italy) L Nardi	6	0	3
5	(United Kingdom) J Fearnley	4	6	6
4	(Australia) T Schoolkate	6	3	6
Q	(United Kingdom) P Jubb	4	6	3
(France) U Blanchet	3	3
WC	(United Kingdom) O Tarvet	6	6
WC	(United Kingdom) F Gill	6^{4}	6	1
Q	(Italy) F Romano	7^{7}	4	6
WC	(United Kingdom) H Wendelken	4	4
8	(United Kingdom) J Pinnington Jones	6	6

Second round
1	(Portugal) H Rocha	6^{4}	6	3
NG	(United States) Dar Blanch	7^{7}	1	6
Q	(United States) K Smith	6	5	4
5	(United Kingdom) J Fearnley	4	7	6
4	(Australia) T Schoolkate	3	2
WC	(United Kingdom) O Tarvet	6	6
Q	(Italy) F Romano	7	5	6
8	(United Kingdom) J Pinnington Jones	5	7	3

Quarterfinals
NG	(United States) Dar Blanch	6^{4}	6^{6}
5	(United Kingdom) J Fearnley	7^{7}	7^{8}
WC	(United Kingdom) O Tarvet	6^{2}	6	1
Q	(Italy) F Romano	7^{7}	0	6

Semifinals
5	(United Kingdom) J Fearnley	6	6^{4}	6
Q	(Italy) F Romano	3	7^{7}	4

=== Bottom half ===
First round
7	(Australia) D Sweeny	6	6
Q	(United Kingdom) Oliver Okonkwo	4	4
(United Kingdom) B Harris	6^{5}	6	7^{15}
Alt	(France) C Chidekh	7^{7}	4	6^{13}
(France) K Jacquet	6	6^{10}	4
(United Kingdom) T Samuel	1	7^{12}	6
(Denmark) A Holmgren	6	7^{7}
3	(Norway) N Budkov Kjær	0	6^{4}
6	(Italy) F Maestrelli	6^{4}	6	1
(France) A Géa	7^{7}	3	6
LL	(Estonia) M Lajal	4	6	7^{7}
(United States) M Zheng	6	4	6^{5}
Alt	(China) Y Bu	7^{9}	7
(Luxembourg) C Rodesch	6^{7}	5
Q	(United Kingdom) H Stewart	1	6	3
2	(Switzerland) L Riedi	6	3	6

Second round
7	(Australia) D Sweeny	6	7^{7}
(United Kingdom) B Harris	4	6^{5}
(United Kingdom) T Samuel	6	6
(Denmark) A Holmgren	3	3
(France) A Géa	3	6	3
LL	(Estonia) M Lajal	6	3	6
Alt	(China) Y Bu	w/o
2	(Switzerland) L Riedi

Quarterfinals
7	(Australia) D Sweeny	5	6	6
(United Kingdom) T Samuel	7	2	3
LL	(Estonia) M Lajal	4	1
Alt	(China) Y Bu	6	6

Semifinals
7	(Australia) D Sweeny	6^{4}	6^{6}
Alt	(China) Y Bu	7^{7}	7^{8}
