= 2026 Jingshan Tennis Open – Men's singles =

Men's singles
- 2026 Jingshan Tennis Open

Final
- Champion: (South Africa) Lloyd Harris
- Runner-up: (Italy) Mattia Bellucci
- Score: 1–6, 6–3, 7–6^{(7–4)}

Events
Singles	men	women
Doubles	men	women
- Jingshan Tennis Open

Eliot Spizzirri was the defending champion but chose not to defend his title.

Lloyd Harris won the title after defeating Mattia Bellucci 1–6, 6–3, 7–6^{(7–4)} in the final.

== Seeds ==
1. (United States) Michael Zheng (second round)
2. (Australia) Dane Sweeny (quarterfinals)
3. (Czech Republic) Dalibor Svrčina (first round)
4. (Greece) Stefanos Sakellaridis (first round)
5. (France) Alexandre Müller (first round)
6. (South Africa) Lloyd Harris (champion)
7. (Australia) Alex Bolt (semifinals, retired)
8. (Italy) Federico Cinà (quarterfinals)

== Draw ==
Key

- Q = Qualifier
- WC = Wild card
- LL = Lucky loser
- Alt = Alternate
- ITF = ITF entry
- PR = Protected ranking
- SR = Special ranking
- SE = Special exempt
- JE = Junior exempt
- JR = Junior Accelerator Programme entrant
- CO = College Accelerator Programme entrant
- NG = Next Gen Accelerator Program entrant
- w/o = Walkover
- r = Retired
- d = Defaulted

=== Finals ===
Semifinals
(Turkey) Yankı Erel	4	4
Q	(Italy) Mattia Bellucci	6	6
6	(South Africa) Lloyd Harris	5	7^{7}	0
7	(Australia) Alex Bolt	7	6^{2}	0^{r}

Final
Q	(Italy) Mattia Bellucci	6	3	6^{4}
6	(South Africa) Lloyd Harris	1	6	7^{7}

=== Top half ===
First round
1/WC	(United States) M Zheng	7^{7}	6
WC	(China) Zeng Yaojie	6^{3}	1
Alt	(France) A Weber	4	2
(Turkey) Y Erel	6	6
(Sweden) E Ymer	4	7	5
Q	(France) T Atmane	6	5	5^{r}
(Australia) J McCabe	2	3
8	(Italy) F Cinà	6	6
4	(Greece) S Sakellaridis	6^{11}	2
Alt	(Japan) Y Shimizu	7^{13}	6
(Australia) B Tomic	6	6^{8}	6
(China) F Sun	4	7^{10}	3
Q	(Australia) A Walton	6	6
(France) M Kouamé	1	4
Q	(Italy) M Bellucci	6	6
5	(France) A Müller	0	3

Second round
1/WC	(United States) M Zheng	1	6^{5}
(Turkey) Y Erel	6	7^{7}
(Sweden) E Ymer	6	3	4
8	(Italy) F Cinà	3	6	6
Alt	(Japan) Y Shimizu	7	2	6^{5}
(Australia) B Tomic	5	6	7^{7}
Q	(Australia) A Walton	5	2
Q	(Italy) M Bellucci	7	6

Quarterfinals
(Turkey) Y Erel	7	7^{7}
8	(Italy) F Cinà	5	6^{3}
(Australia) B Tomic
Q	(Italy) M Bellucci	w/o

Semifinals
(Turkey) Y Erel	4	4
Q	(Italy) M Bellucci	6	6

=== Bottom half ===
First round
6	(South Africa) L Harris	6	6
(Canada) A Galarneau	2	3
(Japan) A Santillan	2	4
(France) L Pavlovic	6	6
(Australia) Matthew Dellavedova	4	3
(United States) Andre Ilagan	6	6
Q	M Sharipov	3	6	6
3	(Czech Republic) D Svrčina	6	3	1
7	(Australia) A Bolt	6	6
Alt	Semen Pankin	3	2
Q	(United States) E Zhu	6	6
WC	(China) Liu Hanyi	3	4
Alt	(Japan) M Imamura	5	4
P Bar Biryukov	7	6
Q	(Australia) O Jasika	2	6	3
2	(Australia) D Sweeny	6	3	6

Second round
6	(South Africa) L Harris	6	6
(France) L Pavlovic	2	3
(United States) A Ilagan	6	7^{7}
Q	M Sharipov	2	6^{5}
7	(Australia) A Bolt	6^{6}	6	6
Q	(United States) E Zhu	7^{8}	4	2
P Bar Biryukov	4	1
2	(Australia) D Sweeny	6	6

Quarterfinals
6	(South Africa) L Harris	7	6
(United States) A Ilagan	5	1
7	(Australia) A Bolt	6	7^{7}
2	(Australia) D Sweeny	3	6^{3}

Semifinals
6	(South Africa) L Harris	5	7^{7}	0
7	(Australia) A Bolt	7	6^{2}	0^{r}
