= 2026 Ilkley Open – Men's doubles =

Men's doubles
- 2026 Ilkley Open

Final
- Champions: (United Kingdom) David Stevenson (United Kingdom) Marcus Willis
- Runners-up: (India) Rithvik Choudary Bollipalli (United States) Trey Hilderbrand
- Score: 7–6^{(7–5)}, 6–3

Events
Singles	men	women
Doubles	men	women
- Ilkley Open

Diego Hidalgo and Patrik Trhac were the defending champions but chose not to defend their title.

David Stevenson and Marcus Willis won the title after defeating Rithvik Choudary Bollipalli and Trey Hilderbrand 7–6^{(7–5)}, 6–3 in the final.

== Seeds ==
1. (United States) Mac Kiger / (United States) Reese Stalder (first round)
2. (New Zealand) Finn Reynolds / (New Zealand) James Watt (quarterfinals)
3. (Colombia) Nicolás Barrientos / (Uruguay) Ariel Behar (first round)
4. (Ecuador) Gonzalo Escobar / (United States) Benjamin Kittay (semifinals)

== Draw ==
Key

- Q = Qualifier
- WC = Wild card
- LL = Lucky loser
- Alt = Alternate
- ITF = ITF entry
- PR = Protected ranking
- SR = Special ranking
- SE = Special exempt
- JE = Junior exempt
- JR = Junior Accelerator Programme entrant
- CO = College Accelerator Programme entrant
- NG = Next Gen Accelerator Program entrant
- w/o = Walkover
- r = Retired
- d = Defaulted

First round
1	(United States) M Kiger (United States) R Stalder	3	3
(India) RC Bollipalli (United States) T Hilderbrand	6	6
(Australia) B Bayldon (Australia) T Schoolkate	1	6^{2}
WC	(United Kingdom) F Bass (United Kingdom) S Duncan	6	7^{7}
4	(Ecuador) G Escobar (United States) B Kittay	7^{9}	0
(Switzerland) L Riedi (Portugal) H Rocha	6^{7}	0^{r}
(Chinese Taipei) R Ho (Japan) R Noguchi	3	5
(Italy) F Maestrelli (Italy) F Romano	6	7
(India) A Chandrasekar (Japan) T Yuzuki	6^{4}	5
(United Kingdom) D Stevenson (United Kingdom) M Willis	7^{7}	7
(France) U Blanchet (France) K Jacquet	6	6
3	(Colombia) N Barrientos (Uruguay) A Behar	3	4
(United Kingdom) B Jones (United Kingdom) J Paris	6	6^{3}	[8]
(Denmark) A Holmgren (India) VS Prashanth	2	7^{7}	[10]
WC	(United Kingdom) A Gray (United Kingdom) T Samuel	3	4
2	(New Zealand) F Reynolds (New Zealand) J Watt	6	6

Quarterfinals
(India) RC Bollipalli (United States) T Hilderbrand	7	7
WC	(United Kingdom) F Bass (United Kingdom) S Duncan	5	5
4	(Ecuador) G Escobar (United States) B Kittay	3	6	[10]
(Italy) F Maestrelli (Italy) F Romano	6	4	[7]
(United Kingdom) D Stevenson (United Kingdom) M Willis	6^{4}	7^{7}	[14]
(France) U Blanchet (France) K Jacquet	7^{7}	6^{2}	[12]
(Denmark) A Holmgren (India) VS Prashanth	3	6	[15]
2	(New Zealand) F Reynolds (New Zealand) J Watt	6	3	[13]

Semifinals
(India) RC Bollipalli (United States) T Hilderbrand	7	7
4	(Ecuador) G Escobar (United States) B Kittay	5	5
(United Kingdom) D Stevenson (United Kingdom) M Willis	7^{7}	7^{7}
(Denmark) A Holmgren (India) VS Prashanth	6^{5}	6^{2}

Final
(India) RC Bollipalli (United States) T Hilderbrand	6^{5}	3
(United Kingdom) D Stevenson (United Kingdom) M Willis	7^{7}	6
