= 2026 Jingshan Tennis Open – Women's doubles =

Women's doubles
- 2026 Jingshan Tennis Open

Final
- Champions: (United Kingdom) Madeleine Brooks (United Kingdom) Amelia Rajecki
- Runners-up: Sofya Lansere; Alexandra Shubladze
- Score: 6–7^{(5–7)}, 7–6^{(7–1)}, [10–6]

Events
| Singles | men | women |
| Doubles | men | women |
- Jingshan Tennis Open

Madeleine Brooks and Amelia Rajecki won the title, defeating Sofya Lansere and Alexandra Shubladze 6–7^{(5–7)}, 7–6^{(7–1)}, [10–6] in the final.

Eudice Chong and Liang En-shuo were the reigning champions, but both chose to participate at the Asian Games.

== Seeds ==
1. (Czech Republic) Anastasia Dețiuc / Irina Khromacheva (quarterfinals)
2. (Japan) Makoto Ninomiya / (Slovenia) Nika Radišić (first round)
3. (Japan) Eri Hozumi / (Spain) Sara Sorribes Tormo (first round)
4. (Chinese Taipei) Cho I-hsuan / (Chinese Taipei) Cho Yi-tsen (first round)

== Draw ==
Key

- Q = Qualifier
- WC = Wild card
- LL = Lucky loser
- Alt = Alternate
- ITF = ITF entry
- PR = Protected ranking
- SR = Special ranking
- SE = Special exempt
- JE = Junior exempt
- JR = Junior Accelerator Programme entrant
- CO = College Accelerator Programme entrant
- NG = Next Gen Accelerator Program entrant
- w/o = Walkover
- r = Retired
- d = Defaulted

First round
1 | (Czech Republic) A Dețiuc; I Khromacheva | 6 | 6
(Belgium) S Costoulas (Brazil) I Martins | 2 | 4
(Chinese Taipei) Y-h Lee (China) Q Ye | 5 | 6 | [10]
WC | (China) M Guo (China) Y Yang | 7 | 2 | [4]
3 | (Japan) E Hozumi (Spain) S Sorribes Tormo | 6 | 6^{5} | [2]
(China) Y Huang (Japan) N Kawaguchi | 4 | 7^{7} | [10]
S Lansere; A Shubladze | 2
(China) S Feng (China) F Tian | 0^{r}
(Japan) H Kuwata (China) W Zheng | 7^{7} | 6
(Indonesia) P Nugroho; E Yashina | 6^{3} | 1
(Chinese Taipei) Y-y Li (China) Y Zhang | 6 | 6
4 | (Chinese Taipei) I-h Cho (Chinese Taipei) Y-t Cho | 2 | 3
D Egorova; A Ibragimova | 6^{5} | 4
(Italy) TC Grant (Australia) E Jones | 7^{7} | 6
(United Kingdom) M Brooks (United Kingdom) A Rajecki | 7^{7} | 6
2 | (Japan) M Ninomiya (Slovenia) N Radišić | 6^{5} | 0

Quarterfinals
1 | (Czech Republic) A Dețiuc; I Khromacheva | 4 | 5
(Chinese Taipei) Y-h Lee (China) Q Ye | 6 | 7
(China) Y Huang (Japan) N Kawaguchi | 6 | 3 | [7]
S Lansere; A Shubladze | 2 | 6 | [10]
(Japan) H Kuwata (China) W Zheng | 6 | 5 | [12]
(Chinese Taipei) Y-y Li (China) Y Zhang | 4 | 7 | [14]
(Italy) TC Grant (Australia) E Jones | 2 | 2
(United Kingdom) M Brooks (United Kingdom) A Rajecki | 6 | 6

Semifinals
(Chinese Taipei) Y-h Lee (China) Q Ye | 6^{5} | 1
S Lansere; A Shubladze | 7^{7} | 6
(Chinese Taipei) Y-y Li (China) Y Zhang | 3 | 6 | [10]
(United Kingdom) M Brooks (United Kingdom) A Rajecki | 6 | 3 | [12]

Final
S Lansere; A Shubladze | 7^{7} | 6^{1} | [6]
(United Kingdom) M Brooks (United Kingdom) A Rajecki | 6^{5} | 7^{7} | [10]
