= 2026 Shimadzu All Japan Indoor Tennis Championships =

Tennis tournament

- Date: 9–15 March 2026
- Edition: 5th
- Category: ITF Women's World Tennis Tour
- Prize money: $60,000
- Surface: Hard / Indoor
- Location: Kyoto, Japan

2025 Champions

Singles
- (Japan) Sara Saito

Doubles
- (Japan) Saki Imamura / (South Korea) Park So-hyun
- Shimadzu All Japan Indoor Tennis Championships

The 2026 Shimadzu All Japan Indoor Tennis Championships was a professional tennis tournament played on outdoor hard courts. It was the fifth edition of the tournament which was part of the 2026 ITF Women's World Tennis Tour. It took place in Kyoto, Japan between 9 and 15 March 2026.

== Champions ==
=== Singles ===
- (Japan) Hayu Kinoshita vs. (Japan) Ena Shibahara 7–5, 6–1

=== Doubles ===
- (Belgium) Sofia Costoulas / Sofya Lansere vs. (Japan) Hayu Kinoshita / (Japan) Sara Saito 6–2, 6–4

== Singles main draw entrants ==
=== Seeds ===
Country	Player	Rank^{1}	Seed
CHN	Zhu Lin	139	1
BEL	Sofia Costoulas	140	2
AUS	Taylah Preston	149	3
CHN	Ma Yexin	186	4
KOR	Ku Yeon-woo	195	5
USA	Claire Liu	205	6
LIE	Kathinka von Deichmann	229	7
JPN	Ena Shibahara	241	8

- ^{1} Rankings are as of 2 March 2026.

=== Other entrants ===
The following players received wildcards into the singles main draw:

- (Japan) Kurea Hayasaka
- (Japan) Hiroko Kuwata
- (Japan) Ikumi Yamazaki

The following players received entry from the qualifying draw:

- (China) Bai Zhuoxuan
- (Japan) Natsumi Kawaguchi
- (Japan) Hayu Kinoshita
- (Japan) Ena Koike
- (Japan) Rinko Matsuda
- (Japan) Eri Shimizu
- (India) Sahaja Yamalapalli
- (China) Yang Yidi

The following player received entry as a lucky loser:

- (Japan) Sera Nishimoto
