= 2026 Ilkley Open =

- Date: 8–14 June 2026
- Edition: 10th
- Category: ATP Challenger Tour 125; WTA 125 tournaments
- Surface: Grass / Outdoor
- Location: Ilkley, United Kingdom

Champions

Men's singles
- (China) Bu Yunchaokete

Women's singles
- (United States) Ashlyn Krueger

Men's doubles
- (United Kingdom) David Stevenson / (United Kingdom) Marcus Willis

Women's doubles
- (United Kingdom) Freya Christie / (United Kingdom) Eden Silva
- Ilkley Open

The 2026 Lexus Ilkley Open was a professional tennis tournament played on outdoor grass courts. It was the tenth edition of the tournament, which was part of the 2026 ATP Challenger 125 and the 2026 WTA 125 tournaments. It took place in Ilkley, United Kingdom between 8 and 14 June 2026.

== ATP singles main-draw entrants ==
=== Seeds ===
Country	Player	Rank^{1}	Seed
POR	Henrique Rocha	119	1
SUI	Leandro Riedi	120	2
NOR	Nicolai Budkov Kjær	121	3
AUS	Tristan Schoolkate	123	4
GBR	Jacob Fearnley	125	5
ITA	Francesco Maestrelli	128	6
AUS	Dane Sweeny	131	7
GBR	Jack Pinnington Jones	132	8

- ^{1} Rankings are as of 25 May 2026.

=== Other entrants ===
The following players received wildcards into the singles main draw:

- (United Kingdom) Felix Gill
- (United Kingdom) Oliver Tarvet
- (United Kingdom) Harry Wendelken

The following player received entry into the singles main draw through the Next Gen Accelerator programme:

- (United States) Darwin Blanch

The following players received entry into the singles main draw as alternates:

- (China) Bu Yunchaokete
- (France) Clément Chidekh

The following players received entry from the qualifying draw:

- (United Kingdom) Charles Broom
- (United Kingdom) Paul Jubb
- (United Kingdom) Oliver Okonkwo
- (Italy) Filippo Romano
- (United States) Keegan Smith
- (United Kingdom) Hamish Stewart

The following player received entry as a lucky loser:

- (Estonia) Mark Lajal

== WTA singles main draw entrants ==
=== Seeds ===
Country	Player	Rank^{1}	Seed
SUI	Viktorija Golubic	82	1
THA	Lanlana Tararudee	97	2
AUT	Sinja Kraus	98	3
CZE	Darja Vidmanova	101	4
NZL	Lulu Sun	109	5
HUN	Dalma Gálfi	115	6
	Alina Korneeva	117	7
USA	Ashlyn Krueger	120	2

- ^{1} Rankings are as of 25 May 2026.

=== Other entrants ===
The following players received wildcards into the main draw:

- (United Kingdom) Daniella Britton
- (United Kingdom) Alicia Dudeney
- (United Kingdom) Katie Swan
- (United Kingdom) Mimi Xu

The following players received entry from the qualifying draw:

- (Czech Republic) Tereza Martincová
- (United Kingdom) Ella McDonald
- (Switzerland) Céline Naef
- Iryna Shymanovich
- (France) Harmony Tan
- (Czech Republic) Vendula Valdmannová

=== Withdrawals ===
Before the tournament

- (Poland) Maja Chwalińska → replaced by (United States) Akasha Urhobo
- (Canada) Marina Stakusic → replaced by Tatiana Prozorova
- (Austria) Lilli Tagger → replaced by (United States) Elizabeth Mandlik

=== Retirement ===
- (United Kingdom) Katie Swan (neck injury)

== WTA doubles main draw entrants ==
=== Seeds ===
Country	Player	Country	Player	Rank^{1}	Seed
	Maria Kozyreva		Iryna Shymanovich	125	1
GBR	Emily Appleton		Elena Pridankina	178	2
CHN	Feng Shuo	JPN	Momoko Kobori	191	3
GBR	Madeleine Brooks	GBR	Amelia Rajecki	270	4

- ^{1} Rankings are as of 25 May 2026.

=== Other entrants ===
The following pair received wildcard into the doubles main draw:

- (United Kingdom) Alicia Dudeney / (United Kingdom) Mingge Xu

=== Withdrawals ===
Before the tournament

- (United States) Kayla Day / (United States) Mary Stoiana → replaced by (United Kingdom) Katie Swan / (Czech Republic) Darja Vidmanova

During the tournament

- (Austria) Sinja Kraus / (Czech Republic) Vendula Valdmannová (Valdmannová - right shoulder injury)

== Champions ==
=== Men's singles ===
- (China) Bu Yunchaokete def. (United Kingdom) Jacob Fearnley 6–3, 7–6^{(7–1)}.

=== Women's singles ===
- (United States) Ashlyn Krueger def. (Switzerland) Céline Naef 7–5, 6–2

=== Men's doubles ===
- (United Kingdom) David Stevenson / (United Kingdom) Marcus Willis def. (India) Rithvik Choudary Bollipalli / (United States) Trey Hilderbrand 7–6^{(7–5)}, 6–3.

=== Women's doubles ===
- (United Kingdom) Freya Christie / (United Kingdom) Eden Silva def. (United Kingdom) Madeleine Brooks / (United Kingdom) Amelia Rajecki 1–6, 6–4, [10–7]
