= Sofya Lansere =

Russian tennis player (born 2000)

Sofya Lansere Софья Лансере
- Full name: Sofya Yevgenyevna Lansere
- Country (sports): Russia
- Born: 29 September 2000 (age 26) Moscow, Russia
- Prize money: US$ 307,927

Singles
- Career record: 235–192
- Career titles: 1 WTA 125, 4 ITF
- Highest ranking: No. 195 (9 November 2026)
- Current ranking: No. 195 (9 November 2026)

Grand Slam singles results
- Australian Open: Q1 (2024)

Doubles
- Career record: 196–127
- Career titles: 1 WTA 125, 18 ITF
- Highest ranking: No. 119 (14 August 2023)
- Current ranking: No. 122 (9 November 2026)
- Last updated on: 9 November 2026.

Sofya Yevgenyevna Lansere (Russian: Софья Евгеньевна Лансере, IPA: [ˈsofʲɪ̯ə ɫən⁽ʲ⁾sʲɪˈrɛ]; born 29 September 2000) is a Russian tennis player. She has a career-high singles ranking of world No. 195, achieved on 9 November 2026. On 14 August 2023, she peaked at No. 119 in the WTA doubles rankings.

== Early life and family ==
Sofya Lansere is a great-great-granddaughter of Russian animal sculptor of French origin Evgueni (or Eugène) Lanceray and a great-granddaugher of Russian painter Eugene Lanceray. She is also a great-grandniece of Russian painter Zinaida Serebriakova and Russian architect Nikolay Lanceray.

She has a sister, Maria, who is one year her senior. As of 2021, Maria was studying at the New Economic School, Skolkovo.

== Career ==
Lansere made her WTA Tour main-draw debut at the 2018 Moscow River Cup in the doubles tournament, partnering with Elena Rybakina.

She made her first main-draw singles appearance at the 2023 Palermo Ladies Open, where she made it through to the second round thanks to the retirement due to injury of Olga Danilović, before losing to third seed Mayar Sherif.

Having qualified for the 2023 Hong Kong Open, Lansere defeated wildcard entrant Cody Wong, but lost in round two against third seed Elise Mertens.

She won her first WTA 125 singles title at 2026 Angola Ladies Open, defeating Anna Blinkova in the final.

== WTA 125 finals ==
=== Singles: 1 (1 title) ===
Result	W–L	Date	Tournament	Surface	Opponent	Score
Win	1–0	Nov 2026	Angola Ladies Open, Angola	Hard	(France) Anna Blinkova	5–7, 6–1, 6–4

=== Doubles: 2 (1 title, 1 runner-up) ===
Result	W–L	Date	Tournament	Surface	Partner	Opponents	Score
Win	1–0	Apr 2026	Huzhou Open, China	Clay	(Russia) Anastasia Zolotareva	(Japan) Hiroko Kuwata (Chinese Taipei) Li Yu-yun	6–4, 6–1
Loss	1–1	Sep 2026	Jingshan Tennis Open, China	Hard	Alexandra Shubladze	(United Kingdom) Madeleine Brooks (United Kingdom) Amelia Rajecki	7–6^{(7–5)}, 6–7^{(1–7)}, [6–10]

== ITF Circuit finals ==
=== Singles: 9 (4 titles, 5 runner-ups) ===
Legend W100 tournaments (0–1) W60 tournaments (0–1) W25 tournaments (3–1) W15 tournaments (1–2)	Finals by surface Hard (4–5)

Result	W–L	Date	Tournament	Tier	Surface	Opponent	Score
Loss	0–1	Feb 2018	Trnava Indoor, Slovakia	W15	Hard (i)	(Moldova) Anastasia Dețiuc	7–5, 0–6, 3–6
Win	1–1	May 2019	Khimki Cup, Russia	W25	Hard (i)	(Bosnia and Herzegovina) Dea Herdželaš	6–1, 4–6, 6–3
Win	2–1	Feb 2020	Trnava Indoor, Slovakia	W25	Hard (i)	(North Macedonia) Lina Gjorcheska	6–2, 6–3
Loss	2–2	Feb 2020	Trnava Indoor 2, Slovakia	W25	Hard (i)	(Romania) Jaqueline Cristian	1–6, 2–4 ret.
Win	3–2	Sep 2023	ITF Kyoto, Japan	W25	Hard (i)	(Japan) Hiroko Kuwata	6–0, 6–1
Loss	3–3	Nov 2023	Bratislava Open, Slovakia	W60	Hard (i)	(Germany) Ella Seidel	4–6, 6–7^{(4)}
Win	4–3	Jun 2025	ITF Ma'anshan, China	W15	Hard (i)	(Sweden) Tiana Tian Deng	6–1, 6–0
Loss	4–4	Nov 2025	ITF Szabolcsveresmart, Hungary	W15	Hard (i)	(Czech Republic) Ivana Šebestová	5–7, 4–6
Loss	4–5	Mar 2026	Jin'an Open, China	W100	Hard	(China) You Xiaodi	4–6, 7–6^{(2)}, 4–6

=== Doubles: 32 (18 titles, 14 runner-ups) ===
Legend W60/75 tournaments (6–5) W40/50 tournaments (2–1) W25/35 tournaments (8–6) W15 tournaments (2–2)	Finals by surface Hard (13–9) Clay (5–5)

Result	W–L	Date	Tournament	Tier	Surface	Partner	Opponents	Score
Loss	0–1	Aug 2017	ITF Moscow, Russia	W15	Clay	(Russia) Aleksandra Kuznetsova	(Belarus) Ilona Kremen (Belarus) Iryna Shymanovich	2–6, 0–6
Loss	0–2	Jun 2018	Fergana Challenger, Uzbekistan	W25	Hard	(Russia) Kamilla Rakhimova	(Russia) Anastasia Frolova (Russia) Ekaterina Yashina	1–6, 6–7^{(4)}
Win	1–2	Mar 2019	ITF Moscow, Russia	W25	Hard (i)	(Kazakhstan) Elena Rybakina	(Ukraine) Ganna Poznikhirenko (Germany) Vivian Heisen	1–6, 6–3, [10–4]
Loss	1–3	May 2019	ITF Khimki, Russia	W25	Hard (i)	(Russia) Anastasia Frolova	(United Kingdom) Freya Christie (Russia) Ekaterina Yashina	3–6, 3–6
Loss	1–4	May 2019	Open Saint-Gaudens, France	W60	Clay	(Russia) Anna Kalinskaya	(Italy) Martina di Giuseppe (Italy) Giulia Gatto-Monticone	1–6, 1–6
Win	2–4	Sep 2019	Meitar Open, Israel	W60	Hard	(Russia) Kamilla Rakhimova	(Russia) Anastasia Gasanova (Ukraine) Valeriya Strakhova	4–6, 6–4, [10–3]
Win	3–4	Feb 2020	ITF Moscow, Russia	W25	Hard (i)	(Russia) Kamilla Rakhimova	(Russia) Natela Dzalamidze (Greece) Valentini Grammatikopoulou	6–1, 3–6, [10–6]
Loss	3–5	Apr 2021	ITF Oeiras, Portugal	W25	Clay	(Russia) Natela Dzalamidze	(Netherlands) Suzan Lamens (Russia) Marina Melnikova	3–6, 1–6
Loss	3–6	Apr 2022	Open de Seine-et-Marne, France	W60	Hard (i)	(Russia) Oksana Selekhmeteva	(Netherlands) Isabelle Haverlag (Lithuania) Justina Mikulskytė	4–6, 2–6
Win	4–6	Apr 2022	ITF Calvi, France	W25+H	Hard	(Ukraine) Valeriya Strakhova	(France) Estelle Cascino (France) Jessika Ponchet	6–4, 7–6^{(5)}
Loss	4–7	Apr 2022	ITF Monastir, Tunisia	W25	Hard	(Russia) Polina Kudermetova	(France) Estelle Cascino (France) Jessika Ponchet	0–6, 6–4, [7–10]
Loss	4–8	Jun 2022	ITF Tbilisi, Georgia	W25	Hard	(Russia) Polina Kudermetova	(Russia) Angelina Gabueva (Russia) Anastasia Zakharova	4–6, 3–6
Win	5–8	Jun 2022	ITF Ra'anana, Israel	W25	Hard	(Russia) Maria Timofeeva	(Romania) Elena-Teodora Cadar (Hungary) Fanny Stollár	6–3, 7–6^{(5)}
Loss	5–9	Sep 2022	ITF Almaty, Kazakhstan	W25	Clay	(Russia) Amina Anshba	(Russia) Ekaterina Yashina (Kazakhstan) Zhibek Kulambayeva	6–7^{(4)}, 7–5, [8–10]
Win	6–9	Oct 2022	Trnava Indoor, Slovakia	W60	Hard (i)	(Slovakia) Rebecca Šramková	(Chinese Taipei) Lee Pei-chi (Chinese Taipei) Wu Fang-hsien	4–6, 6–2, [11–9]
Win	7–9	Jan 2023	Open Andrézieux-Bouthéon, France	W60	Hard (i)	(Russia) Oksana Selekhmeteva	(Switzerland) Conny Perrin (Belarus) Iryna Shymanovich	6–3, 6–0
Loss	7–10	Feb 2023	Open de l'Isère, France	W60	Hard (i)	(Russia) Maria Timofeeva	(United Kingdom) Freya Christie (United Kingdom) Ali Collins	4–6, 3–6
Win	8–10	Mar 2023	Branik Maribor Open, Slovenia	W40	Hard (i)	(Russia) Anastasia Tikhonova	(Romania) Irina Bara (Romania) Andreea Mitu	6–3, 6–2
Win	9–10	May 2023	Open Saint-Gaudens, France	W60	Clay	(Czech Republic) Anna Sisková	(Colombia) María Herazo González (United States) Adriana Reami	6–0, 3–6, [10–6]
Loss	9–11	May 2023	Grado Tennis Cup, Italy	W60	Clay	(Czech Republic) Anna Sisková	(United Kingdom) Emily Appleton (Germany) Julia Lohoff	6–3, 4–6, [9–11]
Win	10–11	Jun 2023	ITF Kuršumlijska Banja, Serbia	W25	Clay	(Greece) Valentini Grammatikopoulou	(Argentina) Jazmin Ortenzi (Russia) Ekaterina Reyngold	6–3, 6–2
Win	11–11	Jul 2023	Open de Montpellier, France	W60	Clay	(Russia) Amina Anshba	(Germany) Julia Lohoff (Romania) Andreea Mitu	6–3, 6–4
Win	12–11	Oct 2024	ITF Huzhou, China	W35	Hard	(Russia) Ekaterina Shalimova	(China) Xiao Zhenghua (China) Ye Qiuyu	6–2, 6–3
Win	13–11	Oct 2024	ITF Qiandaohu, China	W35	Hard	(Russia) Ekaterina Shalimova	(China) Xun Fangying (China) Zhang Ying	4–6, 6–4, [10–5]
Win	14–11	May 2025	ITF Maanshan, China	W15	Hard (i)	(Kazakhstan) Sandugash Kenzhibayeva	(China) Guo Meiqi (Thailand) Peangtarn Plipuech	6–3, 3–6, [10–8]
Loss	14–12	Jun 2025	ITF Maanshan, China	W15	Hard (i)	(Kazakhstan) Sandugash Kenzhibayeva	(Thailand) Peangtarn Plipuech (China) Wang Jiaqi	7–6^{(6)}, 4–6, [4–10]
Win	15–12	Aug 2025	ITF Kuršumlijska Banja, Serbia	W15	Clay	(Russia) Alexandra Shubladze	(Russia) Ekaterina Agureeva (Moldova) Eva Zabolotnaia	6–1, 6–2
Loss	15–13	Sep 2025	ITF Le Neubourg, France	W75	Hard	(Russia) Polina Iatcenko	(United Kingdom) Naiktha Bains (India) Rutuja Bhosale	2–6, 6–1, [6–10]
Loss	15–14	Nov 2025	Trnava Indoor, Slovakia	W50	Hard (i)	(Czech Republic) Ivana Šebestová	(United Kingdom) Alicia Dudeney (Estonia) Elena Malõgina	6–3, 3–6, [6–10]
Win	16–14	Mar 2026	All Japan Indoors	W75	Hard (i)	(Belgium) Sofia Costoulas	(Japan) Hayu Kinoshita (Japan) Sara Saito	6–2, 6–4
Win	17–14	Mar 2026	ITF Maanshan, China	W50	Hard (i)	(Russia) Alexandra Shubladze	(Chinese Taipei) Lee Ya-hsin (Hong Kong) Cody Wong	7–6^{(6)}, 6–2
Win	18–14	Apr 2026	Kunming Open, China	W35	Clay	(Russia) Alexandra Shubladze	(South Korea) Shin Ji-ho (Uzbekistan) Sevil Yuldasheva	7–6^{(4)}, 6–1
