= Hayu Kinoshita =

Japanese tennis player (born 2006)

Hayu Kinoshita 木下 晴結
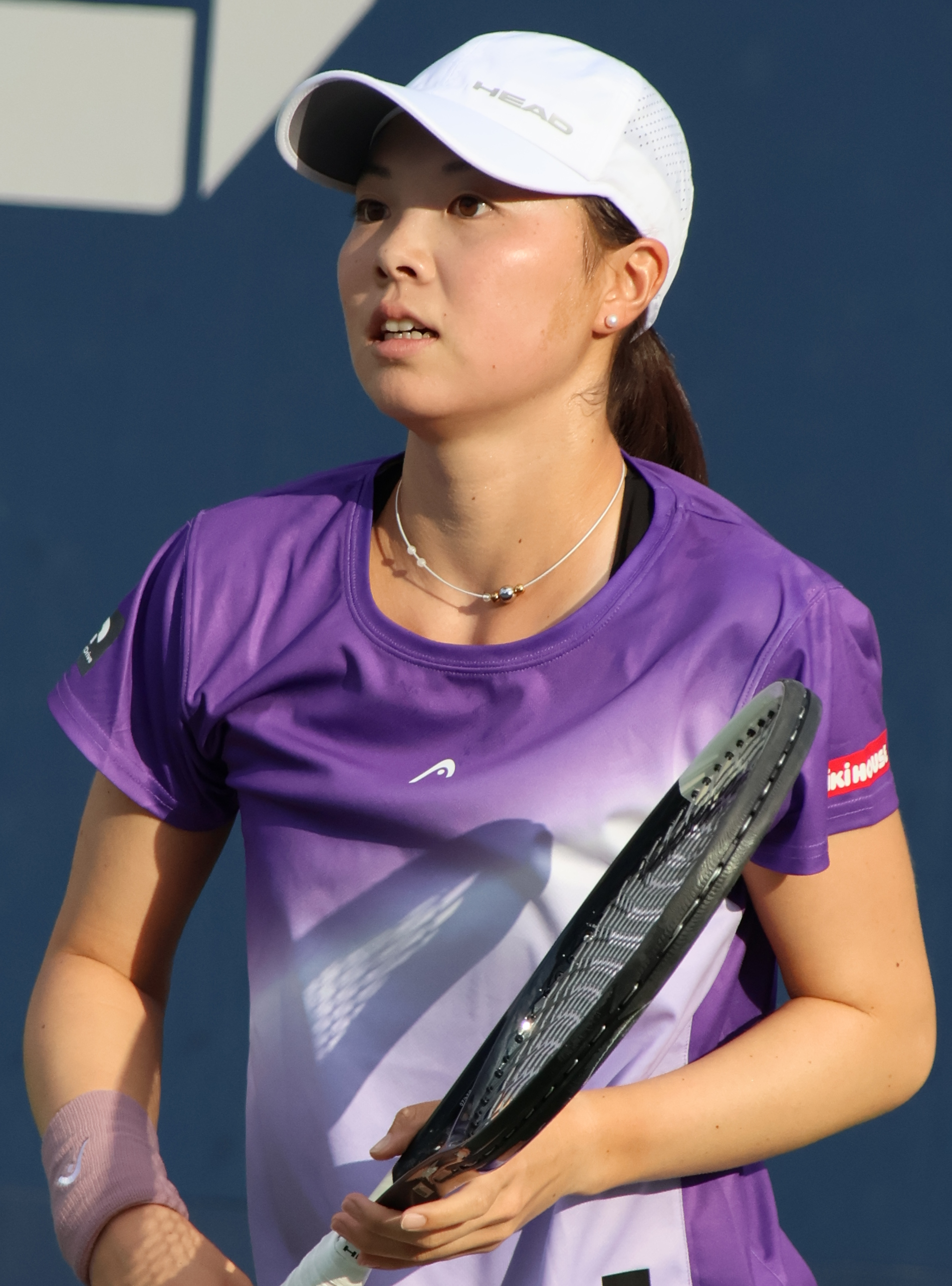
- Kinoshita at the 2026 US Open
- Country (sports): Japan
- Born: 27 October 2006 (age 19) Osaka Prefecture, Japan
- Plays: Right (two-handed backhand)
- Prize money: $78,379

Singles
- Career record: 113–76
- Career titles: 3 ITF
- Highest ranking: No. 212 (25 May 2026)
- Current ranking: No. 227 (22 June 2026)

Grand Slam singles results
- Wimbledon: Q2 (2026)
- US Open: Q1 (2026)

Doubles
- Career record: 46–42
- Career titles: 3 ITF
- Highest ranking: No. 294 (22 June 2026)
- Current ranking: No. 294 (22 June 2026)
- Last updated on: 25 June 2026.

Hayu Kinoshita (木下 晴結, Kinoshita Hayu; born 27 October 2006) is a Japanese tennis player. She has career-high WTA rankings of No. 212 in singles and 294 in doubles.

Kinoshita and her partner Wakana Sonobe received a wildcard for the doubles main draw of the WTA 250 2025 Japan Women's Open and were defeated by Natsumi Kawaguchi and Sara Saito in the first round.

== ITF Circuit finals ==
=== Singles: 6 (3 titles, 3 runner-ups) ===
Legend W75 tournaments (1–0) W25/35 tournaments (1–1) W15 tournaments (1–2)	Finals by surface Hard (3–2) Grass (0–1)

Result	W–L	Date	Tournament	Tier	Surface	Opponent	Score
Loss	0–1	Oct 2022	ITF Makinohara, Japan	W25	Grass	(Japan) Ikumi Yamazaki	5–7, 4–6
Loss	0–2	Mar 2025	ITF Maanshan, China	W15	Hard	Daria Egorova	6–7^{(3)}, 4–6
Loss	0–3	May 2025	ITF Toyama, Japan	W15	Hard	(United States) Carol Young Suh Lee	6–3, 1–6, 3–6
Win	1–3	May 2025	ITF Fukui, Japan	W15	Hard	(Japan) Mio Mushika	6–1, 6–4
Win	2–3	Mar 2026	All Japan Indoors Kyoto, Japan	W75	Hard (i)	(Japan) Ena Shibahara	7–5, 6–1
Win	3–3	Apr 2026	ITF Miyazaki, Japan	W35	Hard	(United States) Hanna Chang	6–4, 7–6^{(11)}

=== Doubles: 8 (3 titles, 5 runner-ups) ===
Legend W75 tournaments (1–1) W50 tournaments (0–1) W35 tournaments (1–1) W15 tournaments (1–2)	Finals by surface Hard (3–4) Clay (0–1)

Result	W–L	Date	Tournament	Tier	Surface	Partner	Opponents	Score
Win	1–0	May 2024	ITF Nova Gorica, Slovenia	W15	Hard	(Montenegro) Tea Nikčević	(Latvia) Margarita Ignatjeva (Czech Republic) Karolína Vlčková	4–6, 7–6^{(1)}, [7–10]
Loss	1–1	Sep 2024	ITF Kyoto, Japan	W35	Hard	(Japan) Yukina Saigo	(Japan) Anri Nagata (Japan) Ikumi Yamazaki	4–6, 5–7
Loss	1–2	Jan 2025	ITF Monastir, Tunisia	W15	Hard	Ksenia Zaytseva	(Japan) Hiromi Abe (Japan) Mayuka Aikawa	3–6, 0–6
Loss	1–3	May 2025	ITF Toyama, Japan	W15	Hard	(Japan) Honoka Kobayashi	(United States) Carol Young Suh Lee (South Korea) Wi Hwi-won	6–7^{(2)}, 2–6
Win	2–3	Sep 2025	ITF Wagga Wagga, Australia	W35	Hard	(Chinese Taipei) Yang Ya-yi	(Japan) Erika Sema (New Zealand) Elyse Tse	6–1, 3–6, [10–8]
Loss	2–4	Nov 2025	Yokohama Challenger, Japan	W50	Clay	(Japan) Natsumi Kawaguchi	(China) Dang Yiming (China) You Xiaodi	2–6, 6–3, [4–10]
Win	3–4	Feb 2026	Queensland International, Australia	W75	Hard	(China) Zhang Ying	(Australia) Petra Hule (Australia) Elena Micic	7–6^{(5)}, 7–5
Loss	3–5	Mar 2026	All Japan Indoors Kyoto, Japan	W75	Hard (i)	(Japan) Sara Saito	(Belgium) Sofia Costoulas; Sofya Lansere	2–6, 4–6
