= Madeleine Brooks =

British tennis player (born 1997)

- Country (sports): United Kingdom
- Born: 9 March 1997 (age 29) Norfolk, England
- Plays: Right (two-handed backhand)
- Prize money: $81,470

Singles
- Career record: 1–3
- Career titles: 0

Doubles
- Career record: 148–103
- Career titles: 1 WTA 125, 8 ITF
- Highest ranking: No. 104 (20 July 2026)
- Current ranking: No. 108 (10 August 2026)

Grand Slam doubles results
- Wimbledon: 1R (2026)
- Last updated on: 19 August 2026.

Madeleine Brooks (born 9 March 1997) is a British tennis player who specialises in doubles. She has won eight titles in doubles on the ITF Circuit. Brooks has a career-high doubles ranking by the WTA of 104, achieved on 20 July 2026.

== College years ==
Before turning professional, Brooks attended the University of North Florida, having received a full scholarship.

== Career ==
=== Professional ===
Partnering Sarah Beth Grey, Brooks won her first tournament on the ITF Women's World Tennis Tour in May 2024, at the W75 Kurume Cup in Japan.

Alongside Alicia Barnett, she made her WTA Tour debut at the 2024 Thailand Open 2 where they reached the semifinals, before losing to Anna Danilina and Irina Khromacheva

Playing with Isabelle Haverlag, Brooks won her fourth doubles title of 2024 at the W75 Trnava Indoor in Slovakia, reaching a new career-high ranking of 127 on 2 December 2024, as a result.

Teaming up with Amelia Rajecki, she won her first WTA 125 title at the 2026 Jingshan Open, defeating Sofya Lansere and Alexandra Shubladze in the final.

== WTA 125 finals ==
=== Doubles: 4 (1 title, 3 runner-ups) ===
Result	W–L	Date	Tournament	Surface	Partner	Opponents	Score
Loss	0–1	Sep 2025	Caldas da Rainha Open, Portugal	Hard	Anastasia Tikhonova	(United Kingdom) Harriet Dart (United Kingdom) Maia Lumsden	0–6, 3–6
Loss	0–2	Jun 2026	Ilkley Trophy, United Kingdom	Grass	(United Kingdom) Amelia Rajecki	(United Kingdom) Freya Christie (United Kingdom) Eden Silva	6–1, 4–6, [7–10]
Win	1–2	Sep 2026	Jingshan Tennis Open, China	Hard	(United Kingdom) Amelia Rajecki	Sofya Lansere; Alexandra Shubladze	6–7^{(5–7)}, 7–6^{(7–1)}, [10–6]
Loss	1–3	Oct 2026	Courmayeur Ladies Open, Italy	Hard (i)	(Sweden) Lisa Zaar	(United States) Catherine Harrison (United States) Dalayna Hewitt	4–6, 4–6

== ITF Circuit finals ==
=== Doubles: 20 (8 titles, 12 runner-ups) ===
Legend
W100 tournaments
W75 tournaments
W50 tournaments
W25/35 tournaments

Result	W–L	Date	Tournament	Tier	Surface	Partner	Opponents	Score
Loss	0–1	Jul 2023	ITF Cantanhede, Portugal	W25	Carpet	(United Kingdom) Holly Hutchinson	(Portugal) Francisca Jorge (Portugal) Matilde Jorge	3–6, 3–6
Loss	0–2	Jul 2023	ITF Roehampton, UK	W25	Hard	(United Kingdom) Holly Hutchinson	(India) Rutuja Bhosale (United Kingdom) Sarah Beth Grey	6–0, 4–6, [4–10]
Loss	0–3	Jan 2024	ITF Monastir, Tunisia	W35	Hard	(United Kingdom) Katy Dunne	(Slovakia) Katarína Kužmová (Slovakia) Nina Vargová	4–6, 3–6
Loss	0–4	Feb 2024	ITF Mâcon, France	W50	Hard (i)	(Netherlands) Isabelle Haverlag	(Italy) Silvia Ambrosio (Germany) Lena Papadakis	7–5, 5–7, [7–10]
Loss	0–5	Apr 2024	ITF Kashiwa, Japan	W50	Hard	(Hong Kong) Eudice Chong	(India) Ankita Raina (Chinese Taipei) Tsao Chia-yi	4–6, 4–6
Loss	0–6	Apr 2024	ITF Shenzhen, China	W50	Hard	(Hong Kong) Eudice Chong	(Netherlands) Arianne Hartono (India) Prarthana Thombare	3–6, 2–6
Win	1–6	May 2024	Kurume Cup, Japan	W75	Carpet	(United Kingdom) Sarah Beth Grey	(Japan) Momoko Kobori (Japan) Ayano Shimizu	6–4, 6–0
Win	2–6	May 2024	ITF Montemor-o-Novo, Portugal	W50	Hard	(Hong Kong) Eudice Chong	(Switzerland) Leonie Küng; Evialina Laskevich	6–4, 6–4
Loss	2–7	Jul 2024	Figueira da Foz Open, Portugal	W100	Hard	(United Kingdom) Sarah Beth Grey	(Japan) Sayaka Ishii (Japan) Naho Sato	6–7^{(1)}, 5–7
Win	3–7	Oct 2024	Hamburg Ladies Cup, Germany	W75	Hard (i)	(Netherlands) Isabelle Haverlag	(India) Riya Bhatia (Netherlands) Lian Tran	6–3, 6–2
Win	4–7	Nov 2024	Trnava Indoor, Slovakia	W75	Hard (i)	(Netherlands) Isabelle Haverlag	(Czech Republic) Anastasia Dețiuc (Czech Republic) Aneta Kučmová	7–6^{(5)}, 6–1
Loss	4–8	Mar 2025	ITF Târgu Mureș, Romania	W75	Hard (i)	(Lithuania) Justina Mikulskytė	(Italy) Camilla Rosatello (Serbia) Nina Stojanović	6–7^{(1)}, 2–6
Win	5–8	May 2025	ITF Pelham, United States	W50	Clay	(Australia) Petra Hule	(Spain) Alicia Herrero Liñana (United States) Anna Rogers	6–4, 7–6^{(4)}
Loss	5–9	Jul 2025	ITF Gran Canaria, Spain	W100	Clay	(Hong Kong) Eudice Chong	(Belgium) Magali Kempen (Czech Republic) Anna Sisková	2–6, 3–6
Loss	5–10	Sep 2025	Ladies Open Vienna, Austria	W75	Clay	(Slovenia) Dalila Jakupović	(Poland) Gina Feistel (Poland) Marcelina Podlińska	6–2, 6–7^{(3)}, [8–10]
Win	6–10	Jan 2026	ITF Leszno, Poland	W75	Hard (i)	(United Kingdom) Amelia Rajecki	(United Kingdom) Mika Stojsavljevic (Czech Republic) Vendula Valdmannová	7–6^{(2)}, 7–6^{(6)}
Loss	6–11	Feb 2026	Prague Open, Czechia	W75	Hard (i)	(United Kingdom) Amelia Rajecki	(Czech Republic) Alena Kovačková (Czech Republic) Jana Kovačková	4–6, 3–6
Loss	6–12	Mar 2026	Open de Seine-et-Marne, France	W50	Hard (i)	(United Kingdom) Amelia Rajecki	(United Kingdom) Mika Stojsavljevic (Czech Republic) Vendula Valdmannová	6–7^{(4)}, 6–4, [4–10]
Win	7–12	May 2026	Slovak Open, Slovakia	W75	Clay	(Romania) Irina Bara	(Poland) Martyna Kubka (Lithuania) Justina Mikulskytė	7–5, 6–2
Win	8–12	Aug 2026	ITF Leiria, Portugal	W50	Hard	(United Kingdom) Amelia Rajecki	(Switzerland) Chelsea Fontenel (Netherlands) Stéphanie Visscher	6–4, 7–6^{(7–1)}
