= Amelia Rajecki =

British tennis player (born 2002)

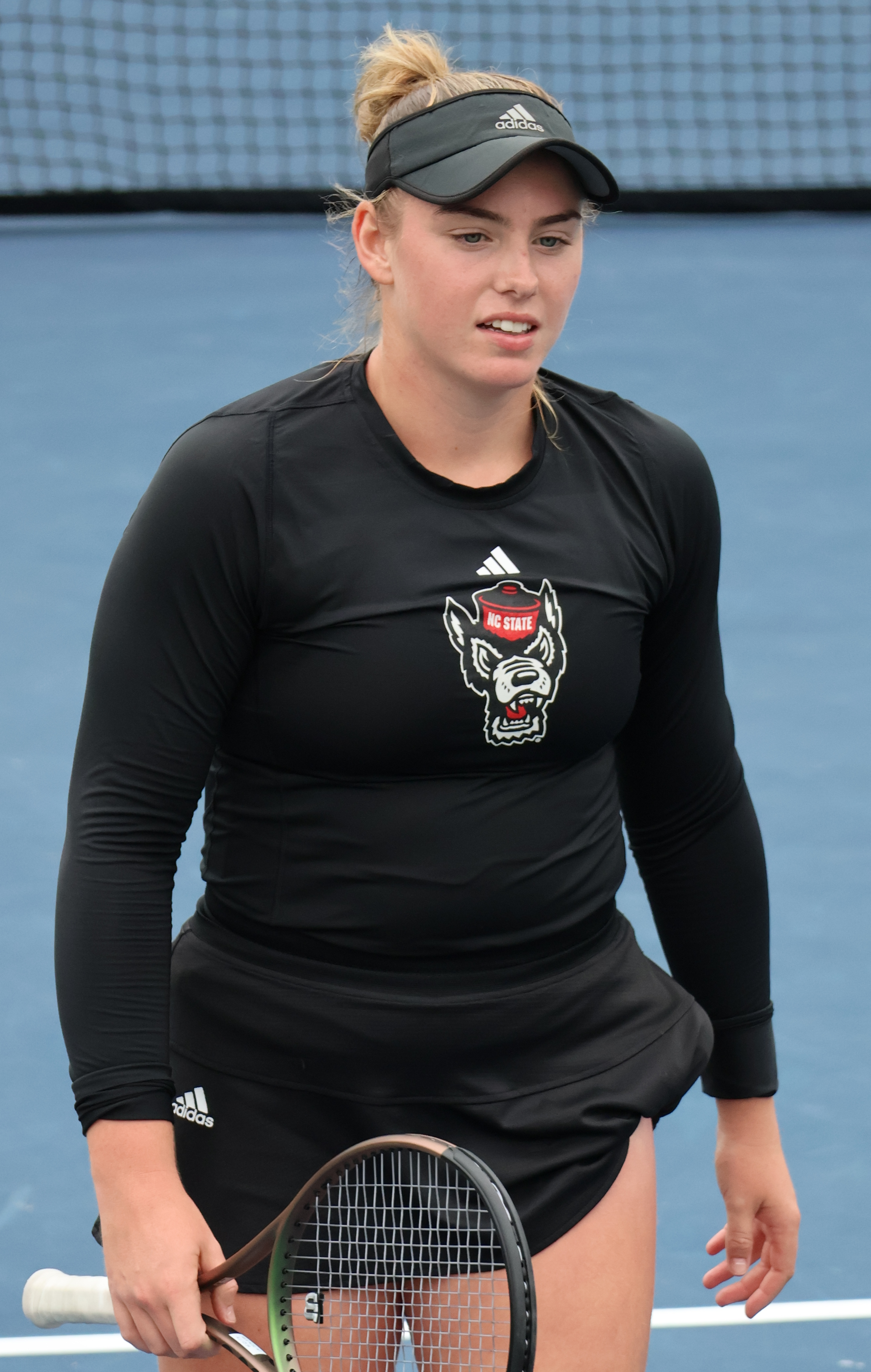
- Rajecki with NC State in 2023
- Country (sports): United Kingdom
- Born: 3 June 2002 (age 24) Nottingham, England
- Height: 1.73 m (5 ft 8 in)
- Plays: Right (two-handed backhand)
- College: NC State
- Prize money: $186,840

Singles
- Career record: 100–87
- Career titles: 2 ITF
- Highest ranking: No. 367 (10 August 2026)
- Current ranking: No. 381 (26 October 2026)

Grand Slam singles results
- Wimbledon: Q1 (2024, 2025, 2026)

Doubles
- Career record: 119–48
- Career titles: 2 WTA 125, 13 ITF
- Highest ranking: No. 121 (12 October 2026)
- Current ranking: No. 134 (26 October 2026)

Grand Slam doubles results
- Wimbledon: 1R (2024, 2026)
- Last updated on: 29 October 2026.

Amelia Rajecki (born 3 June 2002) is a British professional tennis player. She has a career-high singles ranking by the WTA of 367, reached on 10 August 2026. Her career-high doubles ranking is world No. 121, achieved on 12 October 2026. Rajecki has won two WTA 125 doubles titles with two singles titlea and 13 doubles titles on the ITF Circuit.

== Early life ==
Rajecki was raised in Nottingham. She won the British Tour Masters in 2022.

== College years ==
Rajecki began playing for the Wolfpack at North Carolina State University in 2020–21. In her junior year in 2022–23, she set the program record of singles wins in a season with 40 wins and 11 losses. She contributed to NC State winning their first ACC conference title in 2023, defeating Carson Tanguilig of North Carolina in the final. At the 2023 NCAA Championships, where NC State lost to North Carolina in the team final, Rajecki beat No. 1 seed, Fiona Crawley of North Carolina, in the singles bracket, with her run to the semifinals enough to secure All-American honours for herself. She was ranked No. 2 nationally in singles at the end of her senior year in 2024, being named the ITA National Senior Player of the Year, and again reached the semifinals of the NCAA singles tournament.

== Professional ==
Ranked No. 884, Rajecki reached her first WTA Tour main draw at the grass-court 2024 Birmingham Classic defeating Wang Yafan and Katie Volynets in the qualifying rounds. She lost her first-round match to former NC State teammate, Diana Shnaider. Partnering with Mimi Xu, Rajecki won the doubles title at the W100 Shrewsbury event in October 2024, defeating fellow Britons Hannah Klugman and Ranah Stoiber in the final.

Teaming with Kayla Cross, she won her first WTA 125 doubles title at the 2025 Abierto Tampico, defeating Weronika Falkowska and Kristina Novak in the final.

Partnering with Madeleine Brooks, Rajecki won her second WTA 125 doubles title at the 2026 Jingshan Open, defeating Sofya Lansere and Alexandra Shubladze in the final.

== WTA 125 finals ==
=== Doubles: 3 (2 titles, 1 runner-up) ===
Result	W–L	Date	Tournament	Surface	Partner	Opponents	Score
Win	1–0	Oct 2025	Abierto Tampico, Mexico	Hard	(Canada) Kayla Cross	(Poland) Weronika Falkowska (Slovenia) Kristina Novak	6–4, 6–3
Loss	1–1	Jun 2026	Ilkley Open, United Kingdom	Grass	(United Kingdom) Madeleine Brooks	(United Kingdom) Freya Christie (United Kingdom) Eden Silva	6–1, 4–6, [7–10]
Win	2–1	Sep 2026	Jingshan Open, China	Hard	(United Kingdom) Madeleine Brooks	Sofya Lansere; Alexandra Shubladze	6–7^{(5)}, 7–6^{(1)}, [10–6]

== ITF Circuit finals ==
=== Singles: 6 (2 titles, 4 runner-ups) ===
Legend W50 tournaments (0–1) W35 tournaments (1–2) W15 tournaments (1–1)	Finals by surface Hard (2–3) Carpet (0–1)

Result	W–L	Date	Tournament	Tier	Surface	Opponent	Score
Win	1–0	Nov 2022	ITF Santo Domingo, Dominican Republic	W15	Hard	(United States) Victoria Hu	6–3, 6–1
Loss	1–1	Sep 2024	ITF Trnava, Slovakia	W15	Hard (i)	(Slovakia) Nina Vargová	1–6, 6–3, 3–6
Loss	1–2	Jan 2025	GB Pro-Series Sunderland, United Kingdom	W35	Hard (i)	(Czech Republic) Nikola Bartůňková	4–6, 6–3, 3–6
Loss	1–3	Feb 2026	ITF Sheffield, United Kingdom	W35	Hard (i)	(Slovakia) Katarína Kužmová	6–1, 5–7, 3–6
Loss	1–4	Jul 2026	ITF Dublin, Ireland	W50	Carpet	(Czech Republic) Vendula Valdmannová	1–6, 6–7^{(4)}
Win	2–4	Aug 2026	ITF Roehampton, United Kingdom	W35	Hard	(United Kingdom) Ella McDonald	6–0, 6–2

=== Doubles: 20 (13 titles, 7 runner-ups) ===
Legend W100 tournaments (1–0) W80 tournaments (1–0) W75 tournaments (1–2) W50 tournaments (4–2) W35 tournaments (4–1) W15 tournaments (2–2)	Finals by surface Hard (12–6) Carpet (1–0)

Result	W–L	Date	Tournament	Tier	Surface	Partner	Opponents	Score
Win	1–0	Nov 2022	ITF Santo Domingo, Dominican Republic	W15	Hard	(United Kingdom) Nell Miller	(United States) Brittany Collens (Canada) Louise Kwong	7–5, 6–1
Win	2–0	Oct 2023	Tyler Pro Challenge, United States	W80	Hard	(United States) Abigail Rencheli	(United States) Anna Rogers (United States) Alana Smith	7–5, 4–6, [16–14]
Win	3–0	Jul 2024	ITF Nottingham, United Kingdom	W50	Hard	(United Kingdom) Naiktha Bains	(United Kingdom) Katie Swan (United Kingdom) Mimi Xu	1–6, 6–4, [10–8]
Win	4–0	Oct 2024	GB Pro-Series Shrewsbury, UK	W100	Hard (i)	(United Kingdom) Mimi Xu	(United Kingdom) Hannah Klugman (United Kingdom) Ranah Stoiber	6–4, 6–1
Loss	4–1	Jan 2025	ITF Oslo, Norway	W15	Hard (i)	(Slovakia) Katarína Strešnáková	(Sweden) Linea Bajraliu (Netherlands) Joy de Zeeuw	3–6, 0–6
Win	5–1	Jan 2025	GB Pro-Series Sunderland, UK	W35	Hard (i)	(United States) Anna Rogers	(South Korea) Park So-hyun (Hong Kong) Cody Wong	2–6, 6–3, [10–8]
Loss	5–2	Apr 2025	ITF Sharm El Sheikh, Egypt	W15	Hard	(United Kingdom) Ranah Stoiber	(Kosovo) Arlinda Rushiti (Luxembourg) Marie Weckerle	2–6, 3–6
Win	6–2	Jul 2025	ITF Nottingham, UK	W50	Hard	(United Kingdom) Victoria Allen	(United Kingdom) Naiktha Bains (United Kingdom) Holly Hutchinson	6–4, 4–6, [10–6]
Win	7–2	Jul 2025	ITF Roehampton, UK	W35	Hard	(United Kingdom) Alicia Dudeney	(Japan) Rinko Matsuda (Japan) Eri Shimizu	6–1, 6–4
Win	8–2	Jan 2026	ITF Oslo, Norway	W15	Hard (i)	(Slovakia) Katarína Kužmová	(Norway) Matylda Burylo (Germany) Ann Akasha Ceuca	6–4, 6–2
Win	9–2	Jan 2026	ITF Leszno, Poland	W75	Hard (i)	(United Kingdom) Madeleine Brooks	(United Kingdom) Mika Stojsavljevic (Czech Republic) Vendula Valdmannová	7–6^{(2)}, 7–6^{(6)}
Win	10–2	Feb 2026	ITF Sheffield, UK	W35	Hard (i)	(United Kingdom) Lauryn John-Baptiste	(United Kingdom) Alicia Dudeney (Slovakia) Katarína Kužmová	4–6, 6–3, [10–8]
Loss	10–3	Feb 2026	Prague Open, Czech Republic	W75	Hard (i)	(United Kingdom) Madeleine Brooks	(Czech Republic) Alena Kovačková (Czech Republic) Jana Kovačková	4–6, 3–6
Loss	10–4	Mar 2026	Open de Seine-et-Marne, France	W50	Hard (i)	(United Kingdom) Madeleine Brooks	(United Kingdom) Mika Stojsavljevic (Czech Republic) Vendula Valdmannová	6–7^{(4)}, 6–4, [4–10]
Loss	10–5	May 2026	ITF Nottingham, UK	W35	Hard	(United Kingdom) Victoria Allen	(United Kingdom) Freya Christie (Slovenia) Kristina Novak	4–6, 2–6
Loss	10–6	Jul 2026	ITF Nottingham, UK	W50	Hard	(United Kingdom) Victoria Allen	(United Kingdom) Brooke Black (Kenya) Angella Okutoyi	walkover
Win	11–6	Jul 2026	ITF Dublin, Ireland	W50	Carpet	(United Kingdom) Ella McDonald	(United Kingdom) Alicia Dudeney (Poland) Zuzanna Pawlikowska	6–2, 6–1
Win	12–6	Aug 2026	ITF Leiria, Portugal	W50	Hard	(United Kingdom) Madeleine Brooks	(Switzerland) Chelsea Fontenel (Netherlands) Stéphanie Visscher	6–4, 7–6^{(1)}
Win	13–6	Sep 2026	ITF Kyoto, Japan	W35	Hard (i)	(Japan) Hiromi Abe	(Japan) Sayaka Ishii (Japan) Kanon Sawashiro	3–6, 6–2, [10–7]
Loss	13–7	Oct 2026	GB Pro-Series Glasgow, UK	W75	Hard (i)	(Estonia) Elena Malygina	(United Kingdom) Savannah Dada-Mascoll (Kenya) Angella Okutoyi	3–6, 3–6
