= 2018 Fuzion 100 Ilkley Trophy – Women's singles =

Women's singles
- 2018 Fuzion 100 Ilkley Trophy

Final
- Champion: (Czech Republic) Tereza Smitková
- Runner-up: (Ukraine) Dayana Yastremska
- Score: 7–6^{(7–2)}, 3–6, 7–6^{(7–4)}

Events
Singles	men	women
Doubles	men	women
← 2017 ·	Ilkley Trophy	· 2019 →

Magdaléna Rybáriková was the defending champion, but chose to compete in Birmingham instead.

Tereza Smitková won the title, defeating Dayana Yastremska in the final, 7–6^{(7–2)}, 3–6, 7–6^{(7–4)}.

== Seeds ==
1. (Estonia) Kaia Kanepi (quarterfinals)
2. (Switzerland) Belinda Bencic (first round, retired)
3. (Thailand) Luksika Kumkhum (second round)
4. (Switzerland) Viktorija Golubic (first round)
5. (Netherlands) Arantxa Rus (first round)
6. (United States) Nicole Gibbs (first round)
7. (Russia) Ekaterina Alexandrova (semifinals)
8. (Spain) Sara Sorribes Tormo (first round)

== Draw ==
=== Key ===
- Q = Qualifier
- WC = Wild card
- LL = Lucky loser
- Alt = Alternate
- ITF = ITF entry
- PR = Protected ranking
- SR = Special ranking
- SE = Special exempt
- JE = Junior exempt
- JR = Junior Accelerator Programme entrant
- CO = College Accelerator Programme entrant
- NG = Next Gen Accelerator Program entrant
- w/o = Walkover
- r = Retired
- d = Defaulted

=== Finals ===
Semifinals
7	(Russia) Ekaterina Alexandrova	4	3
(Ukraine) Dayana Yastremska	6	6
Q	(Czech Republic) Tereza Smitková	6	6
Q	(Papua New Guinea) Abigail Tere-Apisah	2	1

Final
(Ukraine) Dayana Yastremska	6^{2}	6	6^{4}
Q	(Czech Republic) Tereza Smitková	7^{7}	3	7^{7}

=== Top half ===
First round
1	(Estonia) K Kanepi	6	6
WC	(United Kingdom) M Lumsden	3	2
(Germany) M Barthel	0	6^{3}
(United States) I Falconi	6	7^{7}
(Bulgaria) V Tomova	4	4
(United States) J Loeb	6	6
Q	(United States) M Sanchez	6^{3}	2
7	(Russia) E Alexandrova	7^{7}	6
3	(Thailand) L Kumkhum	4	6	6
WC	(United Kingdom) K Swan	6	3	4
WC	(United Kingdom) G Taylor	1	3
(Ukraine) D Yastremska	6	6
WC	(United Kingdom) H Dart	6	6
(Netherlands) R Hogenkamp	3	0
(Russia) A Kalinskaya	6	6
5	(Netherlands) A Rus	0	4

Second round
1	(Estonia) K Kanepi	3	6	6
(United States) I Falconi	6	1	2
(United States) J Loeb	2	5
7	(Russia) E Alexandrova	6	7
3	(Thailand) L Kumkhum	5	4
(Ukraine) D Yastremska	7	6
WC	(United Kingdom) H Dart	6	6
(Russia) A Kalinskaya	4	1

Quarterfinals
1	(Estonia) K Kanepi	6	4	6^{4}
7	(Russia) E Alexandrova	3	6	7^{7}
(Ukraine) D Yastremska	7	6^{4}	6
WC	(United Kingdom) H Dart	5	7^{7}	3

Semifinals
7	(Russia) E Alexandrova	4	3
(Ukraine) D Yastremska	6	6

=== Bottom half ===
First round
8	(Spain) S Sorribes Tormo	0	6^{3}
(United States) L Davis	6	7^{7}
(Italy) D Chiesa	5	6^{6}
Q	(Czech Republic) T Smitková	7	7^{8}
(Japan) E Hozumi	7^{7}	7^{7}
(Czech Republic) M Bouzková	6^{5}	6^{4}
(Tunisia) O Jabeur	6	6
4	(Switzerland) V Golubic	4	3
6	(United States) N Gibbs	6	3	0
(Russia) E Rodina	2	6	6
LL	(Australia) N Bains	6^{7}	2
Q	(Canada) B Andreescu	7^{9}	6
(Australia) Ar Rodionova	6	6
(Russia) I Khromacheva	0	3
Q	(Papua New Guinea) A Tere-Apisah	6	2
2	(Switzerland) B Bencic	2	0^{r}

Second round
(United States) L Davis	3	1
Q	(Czech Republic) T Smitková	6	6
(Japan) E Hozumi	3	0
(Tunisia) O Jabeur	6	6
(Russia) E Rodina	6	6
Q	(Canada) B Andreescu	3	2
(Australia) Ar Rodionova	2	3
Q	(Papua New Guinea) A Tere-Apisah	6	6

Quarterfinals
Q	(Czech Republic) T Smitková	6	3	6
(Tunisia) O Jabeur	1	6	3
(Russia) E Rodina	1	3
Q	(Papua New Guinea) A Tere-Apisah	6	6

Semifinals
Q	(Czech Republic) T Smitková	6	6
Q	(Papua New Guinea) A Tere-Apisah	2	1
