= 2018 Fuzion 100 Ilkley Trophy – Women's doubles =

Women's doubles
- 2018 Fuzion 100 Ilkley Trophy

Final
- Champions: (United States) Asia Muhammad (United States) Maria Sanchez
- Runners-up: (Russia) Natela Dzalamidze (Kazakhstan) Galina Voskoboeva
- Score: 4–6, 6–3, [10–1]

Events
Singles	men	women
Doubles	men	women
← 2017 ·	Ilkley Trophy	· 2019 →

Anna Blinkova and Alla Kudryavtseva were the defending champions, but both players chose to participate in different tournaments. Blinkova chose to participate at Mallorca, while Kudryavtseva chose to compete at Birmingham.

Asia Muhammad and Maria Sanchez won the title, defeating Natela Dzalamidze and Galina Voskoboeva in the final, 4–6, 6–3, [10–1].

== Seeds ==
1. (Russia) Irina Khromacheva / (Australia) Arina Rodionova (quarterfinals)
2. (Japan) Eri Hozumi / (Thailand) Luksika Kumkhum (semifinals)
3. (Chile) Alexa Guarachi / (Australia) Ellen Perez (first round)
4. (Russia) Valeria Savinykh / (Russia) Yana Sizikova (semifinals)

== Draw ==
=== Key ===
- Q = Qualifier
- WC = Wild card
- LL = Lucky loser
- Alt = Alternate
- SE = Special exempt
- PR = Protected ranking
- ITF = ITF entry
- JE = Junior exempt
- w/o = Walkover
- r = Retired
- d = Defaulted
- SR = Special ranking

=== Draw ===
First round
1	(Russia) I Khromacheva (Australia) Ar Rodionova	6	6
(United States) S Chang (United States) A Mueller	0	4
(Netherlands) A Rus (Mexico) R Zarazúa	2	3
(United States) A Muhammad (United States) M Sanchez	6	6
4	(Russia) V Savinykh (Russia) Y Sizikova	7^{7}	7^{7}
(Australia) N Bains (Papua New Guinea) A Tere-Apisah	6^{3}	6^{0}
(Japan) R Fujiwara (India) P Thombare	7	6^{6}	[10]
(United States) D Krawczyk (United States) I Neel	5	7^{8}	[7]
(Russia) N Dzalamidze (Kazakhstan) G Voskoboeva	6^{3}	6	[10]
WC	(United Kingdom) D Daley (United Kingdom) L Holtum	7^{7}	3	[5]
(United States) J Loeb (Belgium) A-S Mestach	4	6	[10]
3	(Chile) A Guarachi (Australia) E Perez	6	3	[8]
WC	(Switzerland) B Bencic (Netherlands) B Schoofs
WC	(United Kingdom) O Nicholls (United Kingdom) G Taylor	w/o
(Russia) A Kalinskaya (Russia) E Rodina	6	6^{4}	[4]
2	(Japan) E Hozumi (Thailand) L Kumkhum	2	7^{7}	[10]

Quarterfinals
1	(Russia) I Khromacheva (Australia) Ar Rodionova	3	4
(United States) A Muhammad (United States) M Sanchez	6	6
4	(Russia) V Savinykh (Russia) Y Sizikova	6	5	[10]
(Japan) R Fujiwara (India) P Thombare	4	7	[8]
(Russia) N Dzalamidze (Kazakhstan) G Voskoboeva	6	6
(United States) J Loeb (Belgium) A-S Mestach	1	3
WC	(United Kingdom) O Nicholls (United Kingdom) G Taylor	1	6	[3]
2	(Japan) E Hozumi (Thailand) L Kumkhum	6	4	[10]

Semifinals
(United States) A Muhammad (United States) M Sanchez	7	6
4	(Russia) V Savinykh (Russia) Y Sizikova	5	4
(Russia) N Dzalamidze (Kazakhstan) G Voskoboeva	4	7^{7}	[10]
2	(Japan) E Hozumi (Thailand) L Kumkhum	6	6^{2}	[7]

Final
(United States) A Muhammad (United States) M Sanchez	4	6	[10]
(Russia) N Dzalamidze (Kazakhstan) G Voskoboeva	6	3	[1]
