= 2018 Fuzion 100 Ilkley Trophy =

- Date: 18–24 June
- Edition: 4th
- Category: ATP Challenger Tour; ITF Women's Circuit
- Prize money: €127,000 (ATP) $100,000 (ITF)
- Surface: Grass
- Location: Ilkley, United Kingdom

Champions

Men's singles
- (Ukraine) Sergiy Stakhovsky

Women's singles
- (Czech Republic) Tereza Smitková

Men's doubles
- (United States) Austin Krajicek / (India) Jeevan Nedunchezhiyan

Women's doubles
- (United States) Asia Muhammad / (United States) Maria Sanchez
← 2017 ·	Ilkley Trophy	· 2019 →

The 2018 Fuzion 100 Ilkley Trophy was a professional tennis tournament played on outdoor grass courts. It was the fourth edition of the tournament and was part of the 2018 ATP Challenger Tour and the 2018 ITF Women's Circuit. It took place in Ilkley, United Kingdom, on 18–24 June 2018.

== Men's singles main draw entrants ==
=== Seeds ===
Country	Player	Rank^{1}	Seed
AUS	Jordan Thompson	95	1
EST	Jürgen Zopp	107	2
ITA	Thomas Fabbiano	111	3
BLR	Ilya Ivashka	115	4
CAN	Peter Polansky	119	5
IND	Ramkumar Ramanathan	128	6
USA	Michael Mmoh	132	7
UKR	Sergiy Stakhovsky	133	8

- ^{1} Rankings as of 11 June 2018.

=== Other entrants ===
The following players received wildcards into the singles main draw:

- (United Kingdom) Jack Draper
- (United Kingdom) George Loffhagen
- (United Kingdom) Aiden McHugh
- (United Kingdom) Alexander Ward

The following player received entry into the singles main draw as a special exempt:

- (Belarus) Ilya Ivashka

The following player received entry into the singles main draw as an alternate:

- (Estonia) Jürgen Zopp

The following players received entry from the qualifying draw:

- (Poland) Kamil Majchrzak
- (Japan) Hiroki Moriya
- (United States) Noah Rubin
- (Australia) Akira Santillan

== Women's singles main draw entrants ==
=== Seeds ===
Country	Player	Rank^{1}	Seed
EST	Kaia Kanepi	43	1
SUI	Belinda Bencic	61	2
THA	Luksika Kumkhum	94	3
SUI	Viktorija Golubic	99	4
NED	Arantxa Rus	100	5
USA	Nicole Gibbs	109	6
RUS	Ekaterina Alexandrova	110	7
ESP	Sara Sorribes Tormo	114	8

- ^{1} Rankings as of 11 June 2018.

=== Other entrants ===
The following players received a wildcard into the singles main draw:

- (United Kingdom) Harriet Dart
- (United Kingdom) Maia Lumsden
- (United Kingdom) Katie Swan
- (United Kingdom) Gabriella Taylor

The following players received entry from the qualifying draw:

- (Canada) Bianca Andreescu
- (United States) Maria Sanchez
- (Czech Republic) Tereza Smitková
- (Papua New Guinea) Abigail Tere-Apisah

The following player received entry as a Lucky Loser:

- (Australia) Naiktha Bains

== Champions ==
=== Men's singles ===
- (Ukraine) Sergiy Stakhovsky def. (Germany) Oscar Otte 6–4, 6–4.

=== Women's singles ===
- (Czech Republic) Tereza Smitková def. (Ukraine) Dayana Yastremska, 7–6^{(7–2)}, 3–6, 7–6^{(7–4)}

=== Men's doubles ===
- (United States) Austin Krajicek / (India) Jeevan Nedunchezhiyan def. (Germany) Kevin Krawietz / (Germany) Andreas Mies 6–3, 6–3.

=== Women's doubles ===
- (United States) Asia Muhammad / (United States) Maria Sanchez def. (Russia) Natela Dzalamidze / (Kazakhstan) Galina Voskoboeva, 4–6, 6–3, [10–1]
