= 2019 Ilkley Trophy – Men's doubles =

Men's doubles
- 2019 Ilkley Trophy

Final
- Champions: (Mexico) Santiago González (Pakistan) Aisam-ul-Haq Qureshi
- Runners-up: (New Zealand) Marcus Daniell (India) Leander Paes
- Score: 6–3, 6–4

Events
Singles	men	women
Doubles	men	women
← 2018 ·	Ilkley Trophy	· 2022 →

Austin Krajicek and Jeevan Nedunchezhiyan were the defending champions but only Nedunchezhiyan chose to defend his title, partnering Purav Raja. Nedunchezhiyan lost in the semifinals to Marcus Daniell and Leander Paes.

Santiago González and Aisam-ul-Haq Qureshi won the title after defeating Daniell and Paes 6–3, 6–4 in the final.

== Seeds ==
1. (Mexico) Santiago González / (Pakistan) Aisam-ul-Haq Qureshi (champions)
2. (New Zealand) Marcus Daniell / (India) Leander Paes (final)
3. (Chinese Taipei) Hsieh Cheng-peng / (Indonesia) Christopher Rungkat (first round)
4. (India) Jeevan Nedunchezhiyan / (India) Purav Raja (semifinals)

== Draw ==
=== Key ===
- Q = Qualifier
- WC = Wild card
- LL = Lucky loser
- Alt = Alternate
- SE = Special exempt
- PR = Protected ranking
- ITF = ITF entry
- JE = Junior exempt
- w/o = Walkover
- r = Retired
- d = Defaulted
- SR = Special ranking

First round
1	(Mexico) S González (Pakistan) A-u-H Qureshi	6	6
(Chinese Taipei) J Jung (Brazil) T Monteiro	3	1
(United States) N Monroe (Spain) D Vega Hernández	5	6	[10]
(China) M Gong (China) Ze Zhang	7	4	[8]
3	(Chinese Taipei) C-p Hsieh (Indonesia) C Rungkat	7^{8}	1	[5]
(Australia) A Bolt (Australia) M Purcell	6^{6}	6	[10]
(India) S Balaji (United States) J Cerretani	1	5
(Romania) M Copil (France) U Humbert	6	7
(Netherlands) S Arends (Netherlands) D Pel	6	6
Alt	(Italy) S Caruso (Italy) G Mager	0	2
WC	(United Kingdom) L Broady (United Kingdom) S Clayton	6^{6}	3
4	(India) J Nedunchezhiyan (India) P Raja	7^{8}	6
(Australia) M Reid (Australia) J-P Smith	6	6
WC	(United Kingdom) P Jubb (United Kingdom) R Peniston	1	1
WC	(United Kingdom) J Choinski (United Kingdom) E Hoyt	2	6	[7]
2	(New Zealand) M Daniell (India) L Paes	6	3	[10]

Quarterfinals
1	(Mexico) S González (Pakistan) A-u-H Qureshi	6^{3}	6	[10]
(United States) N Monroe (Spain) D Vega Hernández	7^{7}	4	[6]
(Australia) A Bolt (Australia) M Purcell	3	3
(Romania) M Copil (France) U Humbert	6	6
(Netherlands) S Arends (Netherlands) D Pel	4	6	[4]
4	(India) J Nedunchezhiyan (India) P Raja	6	2	[10]
(Australia) M Reid (Australia) J-P Smith	7^{7}	6^{3}	[7]
2	(New Zealand) M Daniell (India) L Paes	6^{4}	7^{7}	[10]

Semifinals
1	(Mexico) S González (Pakistan) A-u-H Qureshi	6	4	[10]
(Romania) M Copil (France) U Humbert	0	6	[4]
4	(India) J Nedunchezhiyan (India) P Raja	3	6^{4}
2	(New Zealand) M Daniell (India) L Paes	6	7^{7}

Final
1	(Mexico) S González (Pakistan) A-u-H Qureshi	6	6
2	(New Zealand) M Daniell (India) L Paes	3	4
