= 2018 Birmingham Classic – Singles =

Singles
- 2018 Birmingham Classic

Final
- Champion: (Czech Republic) Petra Kvitová
- Runner-up: (Slovakia) Magdaléna Rybáriková
- Score: 4–6, 6–1, 6–2

Details
- Draw: 32 (4 Q / 3 WC )
- Seeds: 8

Events
Singles	Doubles
← 2017 ·	Birmingham Classic	· 2019 →

Petra Kvitová was the defending champion, and successfully defended her title, defeating Magdaléna Rybáriková in the final, 4–6, 6–1, 6–2.

== Seeds ==
1. (Spain) Garbiñe Muguruza (second round)
2. (Ukraine) Elina Svitolina (quarterfinals)
3. (Czech Republic) Karolína Plíšková (first round)
4. (Czech Republic) Petra Kvitová (champion)
5. (Germany) Julia Görges (quarterfinals)
6. (Russia) Daria Kasatkina (second round)
7. (Belgium) Elise Mertens (first round)
8. (United States) CoCo Vandeweghe (first round)

== Draw ==
=== Key ===
- Q = Qualifier
- WC = Wild card
- LL = Lucky loser
- Alt = Alternate
- ITF = ITF entry
- PR = Protected ranking
- SR = Special ranking
- SE = Special exempt
- JE = Junior exempt
- JR = Junior Accelerator Programme entrant
- CO = College Accelerator Programme entrant
- NG = Next Gen Accelerator Program entrant
- w/o = Walkover
- r = Retired
- d = Defaulted

=== Finals ===
Semifinals
(Czech Republic) Barbora Strýcová	6^{1}	4
(Slovakia) Magdaléna Rybáriková	7^{7}	6
4	(Czech Republic) Petra Kvitová	6	6
(Romania) Mihaela Buzărnescu	3	2

Final
(Slovakia) Magdaléna Rybáriková	6	1	2
4	(Czech Republic) Petra Kvitová	4	6	6

=== Top half ===
First round
1	(Spain) G Muguruza	6	6
(Russia) A Pavlyuchenkova	1	2
Q	(United States) J Brady	6	5	3
(Czech Republic) B Strýcová	3	7	6
(Ukraine) L Tsurenko	7^{7}	7
WC	(United Kingdom) H Watson	6^{2}	5
Q	(Czech Republic) Kr Plíšková	6	5	4
6	(Russia) D Kasatkina	3	7	6
3	(Czech Republic) Ka Plíšková	2	3
(Slovakia) M Rybáriková	6	6
(Czech Republic) K Siniaková	6	2	4
(France) K Mladenovic	1	6	6
WC	(United Kingdom) K Boulter	1	2
(Japan) N Osaka	6	6
Q	(Slovenia) D Jakupović	3	7^{9}	6
7	(Belgium) E Mertens	6	6^{7}	1

Second round
1	(Spain) G Muguruza	2	4
(Czech Republic) B Strýcová	6	6
(Ukraine) L Tsurenko	1	6	6
6	(Russia) D Kasatkina	6	3	3
(Slovakia) M Rybáriková	3	6	6
(France) K Mladenovic	6	2	1
(Japan) N Osaka	3	0^{r}
Q	(Slovenia) D Jakupović	6	0

Quarterfinals
(Czech Republic) B Strýcová	7	3
(Ukraine) L Tsurenko	5	0^{r}
(Slovakia) M Rybáriková	6	6
Q	(Slovenia) D Jakupović	2	4

Semifinals
(Czech Republic) B Strýcová	6^{1}	4
(Slovakia) M Rybáriková	7^{7}	6

=== Bottom half ===
First round
5	(Germany) J Görges	6	6
(Greece) M Sakkari	4	4
Q	(France) O Dodin	4	3
(Australia) A Barty	6	6
(Slovakia) D Cibulková	3	6^{6}
(Australia) D Gavrilova	6	7^{8}
(United Kingdom) J Konta	3	4
4	(Czech Republic) P Kvitová	6	6
8	(United States) C Vandeweghe	3	2
(Croatia) P Martić	6	6
(Hungary) T Babos	3	6	0
(Romania) M Buzărnescu	6	4	6
(France) A Cornet	5	6	6
(Russia) E Makarova	7	4	1
(Croatia) D Vekić	1	6	1
2/WC	(Ukraine) E Svitolina	6	3	6

Second round
5	(Germany) J Görges	7^{8}	6
(Australia) A Barty	6^{6}	3
(Australia) D Gavrilova	2	2
4	(Czech Republic) P Kvitová	6	6
(Croatia) P Martić	6	3	2
(Romania) M Buzărnescu	4	6	6
(France) A Cornet	4	2
2/WC	(Ukraine) E Svitolina	6	6

Quarterfinals
5	(Germany) J Görges	1	4
4	(Czech Republic) P Kvitová	6	6
(Romania) M Buzărnescu	6	6
2/WC	(Ukraine) E Svitolina	3	2

Semifinals
4	(Czech Republic) P Kvitová	6	6
(Romania) M Buzărnescu	3	2

== Qualifying ==
=== Seeds ===
1. (Italy) Camila Giorgi (second round)
2. (Kazakhstan) Yulia Putintseva (withdrew)
3. (United States) Bernarda Pera (qualifying competition)
4. (Czech Republic) Kristýna Plíšková (qualified)
5. (United States) Jennifer Brady (qualified)
6. (United States) Sachia Vickery (second round)
7. (Belarus) Vera Lapko (second round)
8. (Russia) Natalia Vikhlyantseva (first round)

=== Qualifiers ===
1. (France) Océane Dodin
2. (United States) Jennifer Brady
3. (Slovenia) Dalila Jakupović
4. (Czech Republic) Kristýna Plíšková

=== Draw ===
==== First qualifier ====
First round
1	(Italy) Camila Giorgi	6	7^{7}
(Japan) Kurumi Nara	4	6^{1}
WC	(United Kingdom) Samantha Murray	3	5
(France) Océane Dodin	6	7
WC	(United Kingdom) Jodie Burrage	7^{7}	6
PR	(Serbia) Bojana Jovanovski Petrović	6^{5}	3
WC	(United Kingdom) Katy Dunne	0	6	6
8	(Russia) Natalia Vikhlyantseva	6	2	2

Second round
1	(Italy) Camila Giorgi	7^{7}	6^{2}	4
(France) Océane Dodin	6^{4}	7^{7}	6
WC	(United Kingdom) Jodie Burrage	5	3
WC	(United Kingdom) Katy Dunne	7	6

Qualifying competition
(France) Océane Dodin	6	6
WC	(United Kingdom) Katy Dunne	2	4

==== Second qualifier ====
First round
Alt	(India) Ankita Raina	3	6	4
(Australia) Priscilla Hon	6	3	6
(United States) Caroline Dolehide	5	4
(Canada) Eugenie Bouchard	7	6
(Hungary) Fanny Stollár	2	6^{10}
(United States) Kristie Ahn	6	7^{12}
(Czech Republic) Denisa Allertová	6	4	6^{3}
5	(United States) Jennifer Brady	4	6	7^{7}

Second round
(Australia) Priscilla Hon	3	4
(Canada) Eugenie Bouchard	6	6
(United States) Kristie Ahn	3	6^{4}
5	(United States) Jennifer Brady	6	7^{7}

Qualifying competition
(Canada) Eugenie Bouchard	6^{7}	6	4
5	(United States) Jennifer Brady	7^{9}	4	6

==== Third qualifier ====
First round
3	(United States) Bernarda Pera	6	6
(Paraguay) Verónica Cepede Royg	2	4
WC	(United Kingdom) Tara Moore	0	5
(Ukraine) Kateryna Bondarenko	6	7
(Italy) Jasmine Paolini	6^{5}	6	6^{6}
(Slovenia) Dalila Jakupović	7^{7}	4	7^{8}
(Germany) Tamara Korpatsch	1	0
6	(United States) Sachia Vickery	6	6

Second round
3	(United States) Bernarda Pera	6	7^{7}
(Ukraine) Kateryna Bondarenko	4	6^{5}
(Slovenia) Dalila Jakupović	7^{7}	7
6	(United States) Sachia Vickery	6^{3}	5

Qualifying competition
3	(United States) Bernarda Pera	3	4
(Slovenia) Dalila Jakupović	6	6

==== Fourth qualifier ====
First round
4	(Czech Republic) Kristýna Plíšková	6	7^{7}
(Romania) Alexandra Cadanțu	2	6^{1}
(Russia) Sofya Zhuk	6	7
(Bulgaria) Sesil Karatantcheva	4	5
(Canada) Françoise Abanda	0	4
(Switzerland) Conny Perrin	6	6
PR	(United States) Jessica Pegula	3	1
7	(Belarus) Vera Lapko	6	6

Second round
4	(Czech Republic) Kristýna Plíšková	6	6
(Russia) Sofya Zhuk	1	2
(Switzerland) Conny Perrin	0	6	6
7	(Belarus) Vera Lapko	6	2	2

Qualifying competition
4	(Czech Republic) Kristýna Plíšková	7^{7}	6
(Switzerland) Conny Perrin	6^{2}	4
