= 2019 Ilkley Trophy =

- Date: 17–23 June 2019
- Edition: 5th
- Category: ITF Women's World Tennis Tour
- Prize money: €137,560 (men) $100,000 (women)
- Surface: Grass
- Location: Ilkley, United Kingdom

Champions

Men's singles
- (Germany) Dominik Koepfer

Women's singles
- (Romania) Monica Niculescu

Men's doubles
- (Mexico) Santiago González / (Pakistan) Aisam-ul-Haq Qureshi

Women's doubles
- (Brazil) Beatriz Haddad Maia / (Brazil) Luisa Stefani
← 2018 ·	Ilkley Trophy	· 2022 →

The 2019 Ilkley Trophy was a professional tennis tournament played on outdoor grass courts. It was the fifth edition of the tournament which was part of the 2019 ATP Challenger Tour and the 2019 ITF Women's World Tennis Tour. It took place in Ilkley, United Kingdom between 17 and 23 June 2019.

== Men's singles main-draw entrants ==
=== Seeds ===
Country	Player	Rank^{1}	Seed
AUS	Jordan Thompson	62	1
FRA	Ugo Humbert	64	2
ROU	Marius Copil	80	3
UZB	Denis Istomin	96	4
GER	Yannick Maden	99	5
ESP	Marcel Granollers	105	6
CZE	Jiří Veselý	107	7
BRA	Thiago Monteiro	109	8
AUT	Dennis Novak	113	9
POL	Kamil Majchrzak	115	10
FRA	Grégoire Barrère	116	11
TPE	Jason Jung	117	12
FRA	Antoine Hoang	118	13
ITA	Salvatore Caruso	122	14
SWE	Mikael Ymer	123	15
ITA	Gianluca Mager	128	16

- ^{1} Rankings are as of 10 June 2019.

=== Other entrants ===
The following players received wildcards into the main draw:

- (United Kingdom) Liam Broady
- (United Kingdom) Jan Choinski
- (United Kingdom) Evan Hoyt
- (United Kingdom) Paul Jubb
- (United Kingdom) Ryan Peniston

The following player received entry into the singles main draw as an alternate:

- (Japan) Go Soeda

The following players received entry from the qualifying draw:

- (Croatia) Viktor Galović
- (United Kingdom) Brydan Klein

The following player received entry as a lucky loser:

- (Russia) Evgeny Karlovskiy

== Women's singles main-draw entrants ==
=== Seeds ===
Country	Player	Rank^{1}	Seed
SVK	Magdaléna Rybáriková	81	1
FRA	Pauline Parmentier	82	2
RUS	Anna Blinkova	89	3
POL	Magda Linette	96	4
USA	Madison Brengle	98	5
SRB	Ivana Jorović	104	6
CHN	Zhu Lin	106	7
THA	Luksika Kumkhum	107	8

- ^{1} Rankings are as of 10 June 2019.

=== Other entrants ===
The following players received wildcards into the singles main draw:

- (United Kingdom) Maia Lumsden
- (United Kingdom) Katie Swan
- (United Kingdom) Gabriella Taylor

The following players received entry from the qualifying draw:

- (United States) Robin Anderson
- (Paraguay) Verónica Cepede Royg
- (Slovakia) Jana Čepelová
- (Italy) Martina Di Giuseppe
- (Netherlands) Lesley Kerkhove
- (Ukraine) Marta Kostyuk

== Champions ==
=== Men's singles ===
- (Germany) Dominik Köpfer def. (Austria) Dennis Novak 3–6, 6–3, 7–6^{(7–5)}.

=== Women's singles ===
- (Romania) Monica Niculescu def. (Hungary) Tímea Babos, 6–2, 4–6, 6–3

=== Men's doubles ===
- (Mexico) Santiago González / (Pakistan) Aisam-ul-Haq Qureshi def. (New Zealand) Marcus Daniell / (India) Leander Paes 6–3, 6–4.

=== Women's doubles ===
- (Brazil) Beatriz Haddad Maia / (Brazil) Luisa Stefani def. (Australia) Ellen Perez / (Australia) Arina Rodionova, 6–4, 6–7^{(5–7)}, [10–4]
