= 2018 Fuzion 100 Ilkley Trophy – Men's singles =

Men's singles
- 2018 Fuzion 100 Ilkley Trophy

Final
- Champion: (Ukraine) Sergiy Stakhovsky
- Runner-up: (Germany) Oscar Otte
- Score: 6–4, 6–4

Events
Singles	men	women
Doubles	men	women
← 2017 ·	Fuzion 100 Ilkley Trophy	· 2019 →

Márton Fucsovics was the defending champion but chose not to defend his title.

Sergiy Stakhovsky won the title after defeating Oscar Otte 6–4, 6–4 in the final.

== Seeds ==
1. (Australia) Jordan Thompson (quarterfinals)
2. (Estonia) Jürgen Zopp (second round)
3. (Italy) Thomas Fabbiano (quarterfinals)
4. (Belarus) Ilya Ivashka (first round)
5. (Canada) Peter Polansky (quarterfinals)
6. (India) Ramkumar Ramanathan (first round)
7. (United States) Michael Mmoh (semifinals)
8. (Ukraine) Sergiy Stakhovsky (champion)

== Draw ==
=== Key ===
- Q = Qualifier
- WC = Wild card
- LL = Lucky loser
- Alt = Alternate
- ITF = ITF entry
- PR = Protected ranking
- SR = Special ranking
- SE = Special exempt
- JE = Junior exempt
- JR = Junior Accelerator Programme entrant
- CO = College Accelerator Programme entrant
- NG = Next Gen Accelerator Program entrant
- w/o = Walkover
- r = Retired
- d = Defaulted

=== Finals ===
Semifinals
8	(Ukraine) Sergiy Stakhovsky	6	7
7	(United States) Michael Mmoh	4	5
(Australia) Jason Kubler	0	5
(Germany) Oscar Otte	6	7

Final
8	(Ukraine) Sergiy Stakhovsky	6	6
(Germany) Oscar Otte	4	4

=== Top half ===
First round
1	(Australia) J Thompson	7^{9}	6
Q	(Poland) K Majchrzak	6^{7}	2
WC	(United Kingdom) G Loffhagen	1	4
Q	(Japan) H Moriya	6	6
(United States) K King	6	3	7^{7}
(Slovakia) N Gombos	3	6	6^{5}
(United Kingdom) L Broady	6	6^{2}	2
8	(Ukraine) S Stakhovsky	1	7^{7}	6
3	(Italy) T Fabbiano	6	6
WC	(United Kingdom) A Ward	3	3
(Kazakhstan) A Bublik	6	6
WC	(United Kingdom) A McHugh	3	4
(Chinese Taipei) J Jung	5	3
(Italy) S Travaglia	7	6
(El Salvador) M Arévalo	6	1	2
7	(United States) M Mmoh	3	6	6

Second round
1	(Australia) J Thompson	6	6
Q	(Japan) H Moriya	2	2
(United States) K King	4	0
8	(Ukraine) S Stakhovsky	6	6
3	(Italy) T Fabbiano	6^{4}	6	6
(Kazakhstan) A Bublik	7^{7}	3	2
(Italy) S Travaglia	2	6	3
7	(United States) M Mmoh	6	2	6

Quarterfinals
1	(Australia) J Thompson	4	4
8	(Ukraine) S Stakhovsky	6	6
3	(Italy) T Fabbiano	1	2
7	(United States) M Mmoh	6	6

Semifinals
8	(Ukraine) S Stakhovsky	6	7
7	(United States) M Mmoh	4	5

=== Bottom half ===
First round
5	(Canada) P Polansky	6	6^{6}	6
Q	(Australia) A Santillan	2	7^{8}	1
(Japan) T Ito	6	6^{3}	6
(United States) B Klahn	4	7^{7}	3
(United States) D Young	4	6^{3}
(Australia) J Kubler	6	7^{7}
Q	(United States) N Rubin	6	6
4/SE	(Belarus) I Ivashka	2	4
6	(India) R Ramanathan	5	3
(Austria) S Ofner	7	6
(Barbados) D King	6	6
WC	(United Kingdom) J Draper	4	2
(Spain) A Menéndez Maceiras	6^{6}	7^{10}	4
(Germany) O Otte	7^{8}	6^{8}	6
(Germany) M Moraing	6^{6}	4
2/Alt	(Estonia) J Zopp	7^{8}	6

Second round
5	(Canada) P Polansky	6	6
(Japan) T Ito	2	4
(Australia) J Kubler	6	3	6
Q	(United States) N Rubin	1	6	4
(Austria) S Ofner	6^{5}	4
(Barbados) D King	7^{7}	6
(Germany) O Otte	7^{7}	6
2/Alt	(Estonia) J Zopp	6^{3}	3

Quarterfinals
5	(Canada) P Polansky	6	6^{3}	2
(Australia) J Kubler	3	7^{7}	6
(Barbados) D King	4	6	1
(Germany) O Otte	6	4	6

Semifinals
(Australia) J Kubler	0	5
(Germany) O Otte	6	7
