= Danielle Collins =

American tennis player (born 1993)

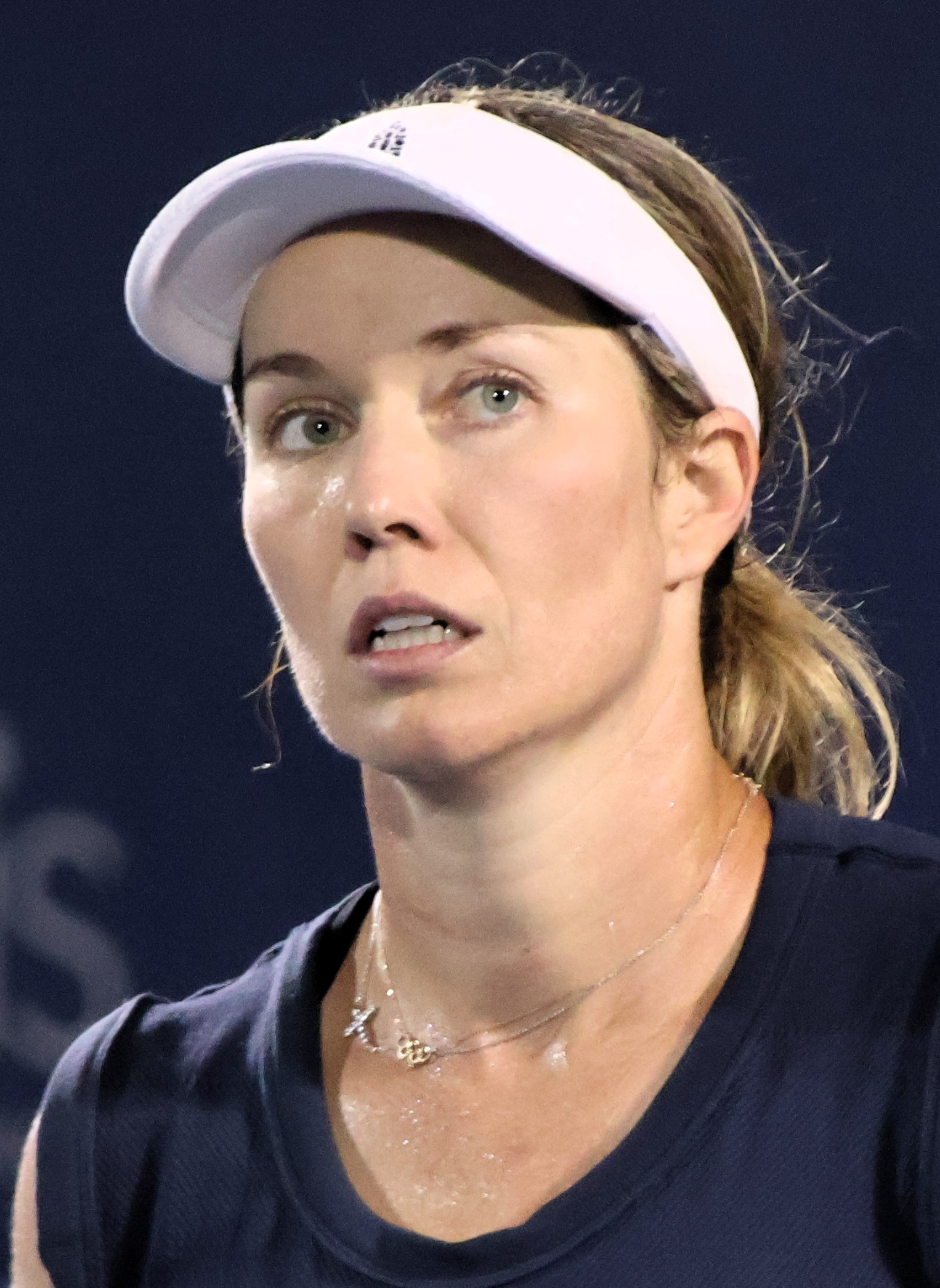
- Collins in 2025
- Full name: Danielle Rose Collins
- Country (sports): United States
- Born: December 13, 1993 (age 32) St. Petersburg, Florida
- Height: 5 ft 10 in (178 cm)
- Turned pro: 2016
- Plays: Right-handed (two-handed backhand)
- College: Florida (2012–2013); Virginia (2013–2016)
- Prize money: $10,271,733

Singles
- Career record: 283–170
- Career titles: 4
- Highest ranking: No. 7 (July 11, 2022)

Grand Slam singles results
- Australian Open: F (2022)
- French Open: QF (2020)
- Wimbledon: 4R (2024)
- US Open: 4R (2022)

Other tournaments
- Olympic Games: QF (2024)

Doubles
- Career record: 32–36
- Career titles: 1
- Highest ranking: No. 79 (October 9, 2023)

Grand Slam doubles results
- Australian Open: 3R (2022)
- French Open: 2R (2019)
- Wimbledon: SF (2022)
- US Open: 3R (2019)

Other doubles tournaments
- Olympic Games: 2R (2024)

Grand Slam mixed doubles results
- US Open: SF (2025)

Team competitions
- Fed Cup: F (2018), record 7–4
- Last updated on: August 10, 2026.

Danielle Rose Collins (born December 13, 1993) is an American inactive tennis player. She has career-high WTA rankings of No. 7 in singles and No. 79 in doubles. Collins has won four singles titles, including a WTA 1000 title at the 2024 Miami Open, and one doubles title. She contested a major singles final at the 2022 Australian Open.

Collins played collegiate tennis at the University of Virginia and won the NCAA singles title twice, during her sophomore and senior years in 2014 and 2016. She finished her career with Virginia as the top-ranked collegiate player. Having first established herself on the WTA Tour when she reached the semifinals of the 2018 Miami Open as a qualifier, her breakthrough came at the 2019 Australian Open where she advanced to the semifinals, defeating world No. 2 Angelique Kerber en route. She won her first WTA Tour title in 2021 at the Palermo Ladies Open. She followed with an Australian Open final, and after initially announcing 2024 would mark her final season, Collins went on a run of form that included the Miami Open title.

== Personal life ==
Collins is the daughter of Walter and Cathy Collins. She is of Dutch descent on her mother's side through her grandmother. Collins graduated from Northeast High School, St. Petersburg, Florida, in 2012. She trained at the Isla Del Sol Yacht & Country Club in St. Petersburg for six years and IMG Academy from 2010 to 2012. She was considered the No. 2 recruit of the class of 2012, and she received a scholarship from the University of Florida.

Collins endured a persistent back injury in the end of the 2025 season and posted she will sit out the start of the 2026 season for her physical recovery.

== Career ==
=== College years ===
Collins played one season of college tennis for the Florida Gators, going 24–8 in singles. She then transferred to the University of Virginia.

During her career with the Virginia Cavaliers, Collins posted a cumulative record of 101–20. Named to the All-ACC first team in all three seasons, she helped Virginia win consecutive ACC Championships in 2014 and 2015. At the NCAA Championships, she became the first Cavalier to the win the singles title in 2014 and became the seventh two-time champion in 2016. She finished her college career in 2016 as the nation's top-ranked player and received the Honda Sports Award for tennis.

Collins graduated from Virginia with a bachelor's degree in media studies and business. She returned to the University of Florida for graduate school to earn a master's degree in sports management in a program partnering with the WTA.

=== 2009–2012: ITF Circuit ===
In 2009, Collins played her first events on the ITF Women's Circuit. She won her first singles title in 2011.

=== 2013–2017: WTA Tour debut, turning pro ===
She did not play any professional matches in 2013 and 2015 while she was playing college tennis at Virginia.

Collins made her WTA Tour main-draw debut as a wildcard player at the 2014 US Open in the Arthur Ashe Stadium, where she forced second seed Simona Halep to a third-setter in the first round.

In mid-2016, she turned fully professional. During her time on the ITF Circuit, she won four singles titles.

=== 2018: Breakthrough and top 50 ===
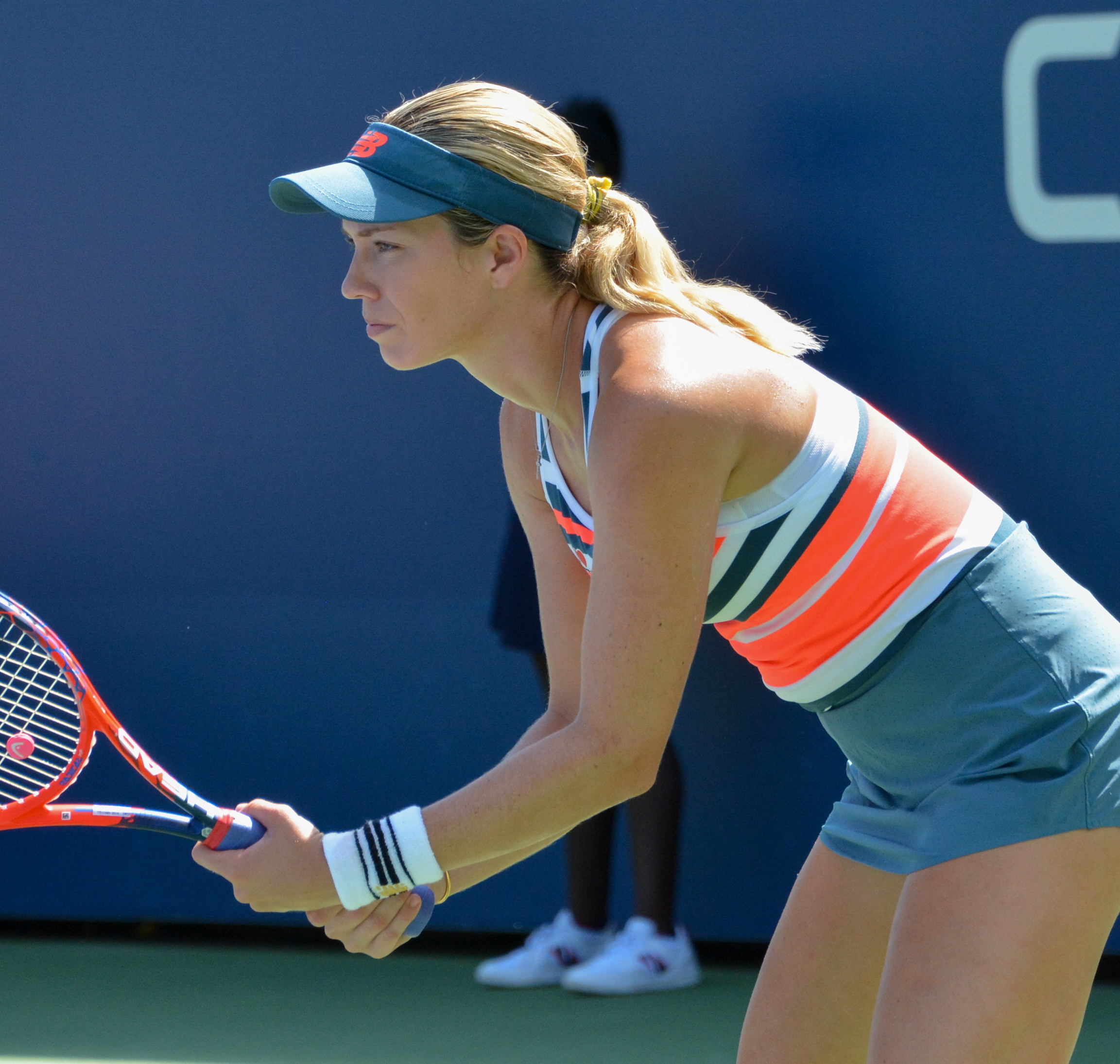
Collins at the 2018 US Open

Collins started the year reaching the final round of qualifying at the Australian Open, before being outclassed by Denisa Allertová, in two sets.

However, she received a wildcard at the WTA 125 tournament at Newport Beach and claimed the title there, which saw her rise to a career-high ranking of No. 120 at that time.

Another impressive run at another WTA 125 tournament, this time in Indian Wells, saw her reach the quarterfinals and thus earn a wildcard for the Indian Wells Open, a Premier Mandatory tournament that also takes place there. There, she won her first WTA Tour match, defeating compatriot Taylor Townsend, before beating world No. 14, Madison Keys, in straight sets, followed by a victory over Sofya Zhuk. Although her run ended in the fourth round against former world No. 6, Carla Suárez Navarro, Collins made her top-100 debut, jumping from No. 117 to 93. Getting through the qualifying rounds at the Miami Open, Collins beat world No. 37, Irina-Camelia Begu, in straight sets, before upsetting two-time major semifinalist CoCo Vandeweghe, in three sets. Victories over Donna Vekić and Monica Puig followed, before she earned the biggest victory of her career, beating her idol, former world No. 1 and seven-time Grand Slam champion, Venus Williams, who was the eighth-ranked player coming into their encounter. With this win, she became the first qualifier ever to reach the semifinals at the Miami Open. She then faced sixth-seeded Jeļena Ostapenko and lost in straight sets, despite having a set point in the first set. After making it to the quarterfinals in Monterrey, Collins broke into the top 50 for the first time.

Collins won back-to-back main-draw matches at only two other tournaments the rest of the season, reaching the third round of the Eastbourne International and the semifinals in San Jose (both Premier-level events) and lost in the opening round at the remaining three Grand Slams. Nonetheless, she finished the year ranked No. 36 in the world, more than 100 spots above her previous best year-end ranking.

=== 2019: Australian Open semifinal, top 25 ===
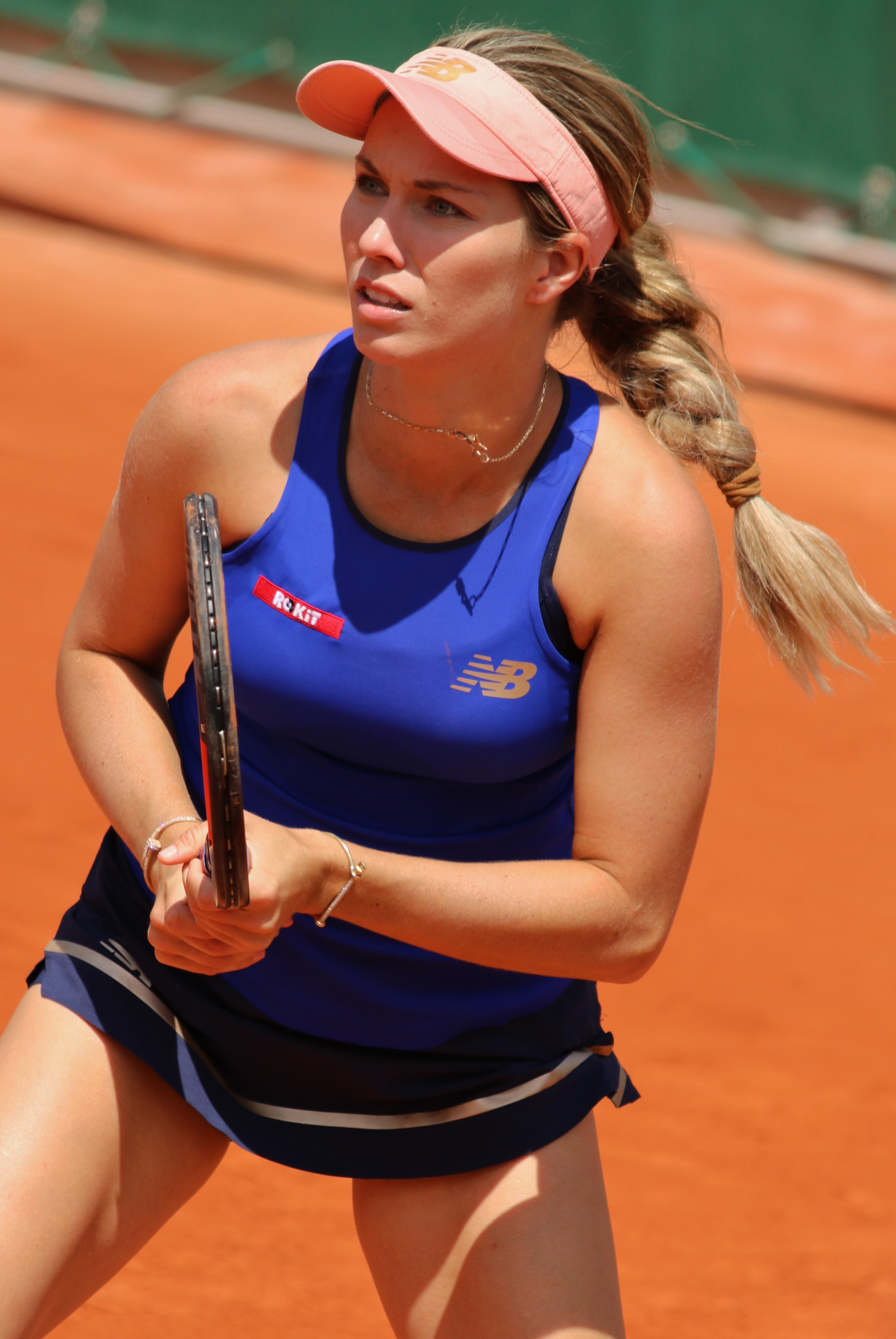
Collins at the 2019 French Open

Her rise continued at the Australian Open. Prior to the tournament, she had never won a match at a major event. After upsetting 14th seed Julia Görges in a tough first-round match, Collins won her next three matches in straight sets; first against Sachia Vickery, then against 19th seed Caroline Garcia. In the round of 16, Collins pulled off the biggest upset of the tournament, dominating the second seed and three-time major champion Angelique Kerber, in straight sets. She thus reached the quarterfinals, where she defeated Anastasia Pavlyuchenkova in three sets. In the semifinals, she lost to eighth seed Petra Kvitová, in two sets. Collins rose to a career-high ranking of No. 23 on January 28, 2019, following the tournament.

She also recorded wins at all the other major events, reaching the second round at the French Open and US Open as well as the third round at Wimbledon. She achieved her best-ever Grand Slam doubles result at Wimbledon, reaching the quarterfinals with Bethanie Mattek-Sands. Collins struggled outside of the majors though, reaching the quarterfinals at just one tournament (the Charleston Open). In December, she won the Hawaii Open, an exhibition tournament, upon the withdrawal of her finals opponent Angelique Kerber. Collins finished the year ranked world No. 31.

At the end of 2019, Collins revealed that she was suffering from rheumatoid arthritis, similar to Caroline Wozniacki.

=== 2020: French Open quarterfinalist ===
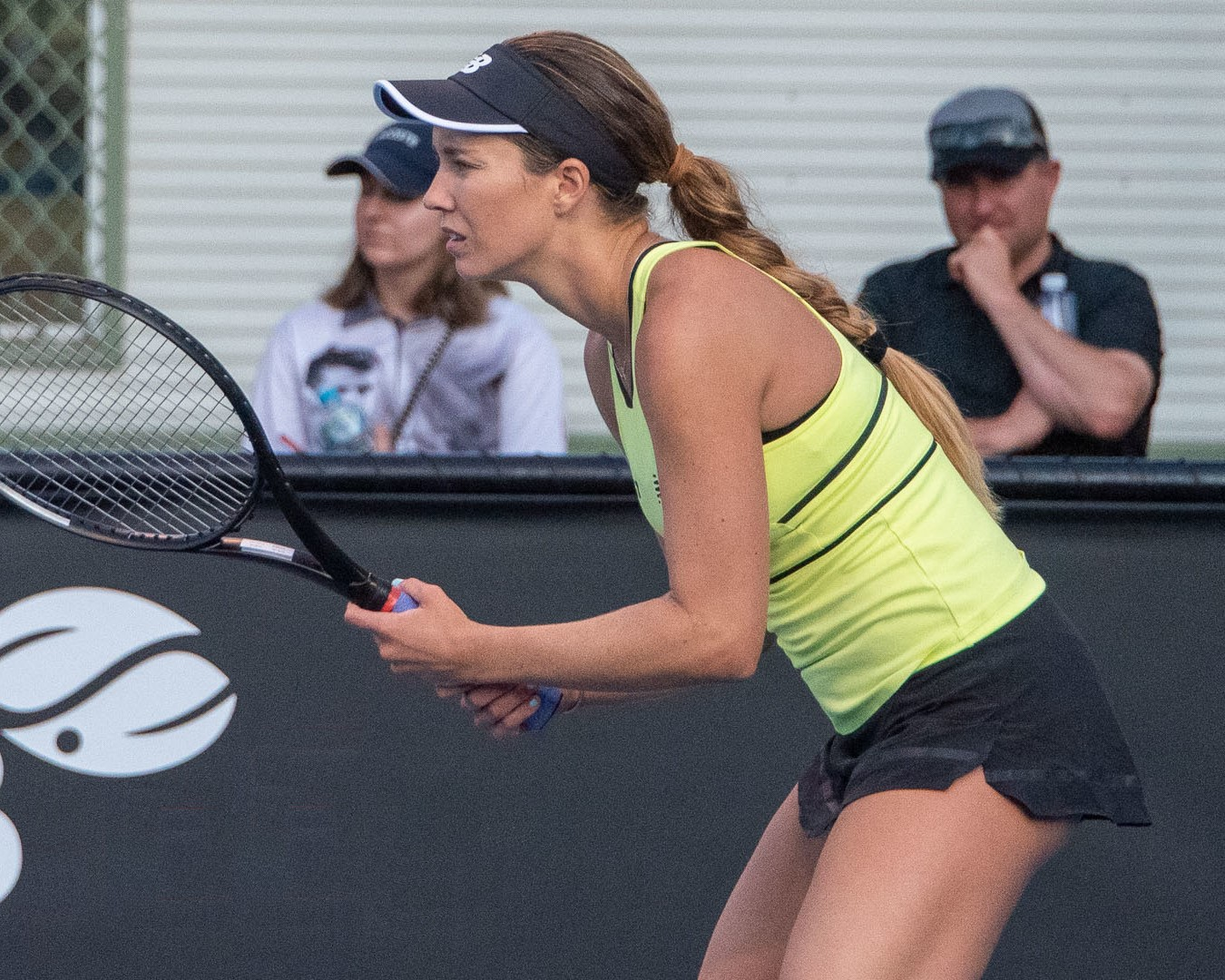
Collins at the 2020 Australian Open

Collins began 2020 with three wins over top-15 opponents. She defeated world No. 5, Elina Svitolina, in the first round at the Brisbane International, before falling to world No. 13, Madison Keys, in straight sets in the quarterfinals. The following week at the Adelaide International, she defeated No. 15 Sofia Kenin in the second round, and then No. 7 Belinda Bencic in the quarterfinals. Collins fell to world No. 1, Ashleigh Barty, in three sets in the semifinals. She lost in the second round to Yulia Putintseva at the Australian Open, and dropped outside the top 50 due to failing to defend her semifinalist points.

Due to the six-month shutdown of the WTA Tour caused by the COVID-19 pandemic, Collins did not play again after the Australian Open until August. She lost in the opening round of her first two tournaments back, to Jil Teichmann at the Western & Southern Open and Anett Kontaveit at the US Open. However, Collins rebounded at the French Open where she reached her second career major quarterfinal. Along the way, she upset two-time Grand Slam champion and former world No. 1, Garbiñe Muguruza, in the third round (handing the Spaniard her earliest exit from Roland Garros since 2013) as well as 30th seed Ons Jabeur, both in three sets. Her run ultimately came to an end against compatriot and reigning Australian Open champion, Sofia Kenin, in a match that for both players was their fourth three-setter of five matches.

=== 2021: First WTA Tour title, return to top 30 ===
Collins was sidelined for the first half of the season with debilitating pain in her back. She was diagnosed with endometriosis and proceeded to have a "tennis ball-sized" cyst removed. In addition to that surgery, Collins was also taking medication for rheumatoid arthritis.

Collins won her first WTA Tour title at the Palermo Ladies Open, defeating Elena-Gabriela Ruse in straight sets in the final. The following month, she won her second WTA title at the Silicon Valley Classic, defeating Daria Kasatkina in three sets. The Silicon Valley Classic win marked her first WTA 500 title. As a result, she reentered the top 30 at world No. 28, on August 9, 2021.

She continued her win streak at the Canadian Open. She beat Jil Teichmann in the first round, and went on to defeat sixth seed Simona Halep in the second. Her 12-match win streak eventually came to an end in the third round, after losing to compatriot Jessica Pegula, in three sets. At the US Open, she reached the third round for the first time after defeating former world No. 6, Carla Suárez Navarro, and Kaja Juvan. She lost her third-round match to Aryna Sabalenka, in straight sets.

In her next two tournaments, Collins reached the quarterfinals in Chicago and the third round in Indian Wells before concluding her season in Linz, where she was forced to retire in her semifinal match against compatriot Alison Riske due to a shoulder injury. Nonetheless, Collins finished the year ranked inside the top 30 for the first time, at No. 29.

=== 2022: Major finalist, world No. 7, American No. 1 ===
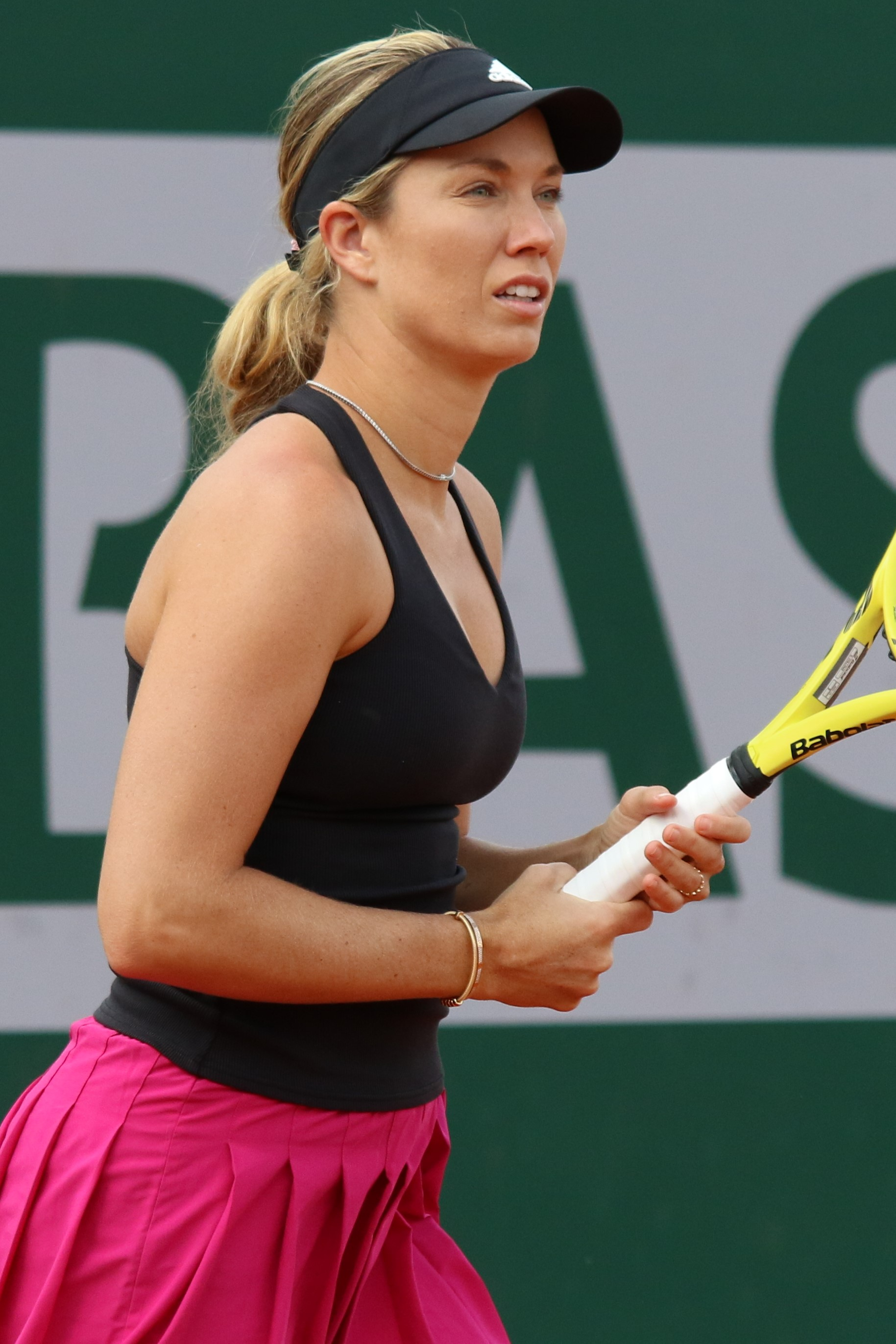
Collins at the 2022 French Open

At the Australian Open, Collins reached the semifinals for the second time, after defeating 19th seed Elise Mertens to become the third American woman in the quarterfinals. It was the second year in a row that three Americans have featured at this stage of the tournament. In the quarterfinals, she beat Alizé Cornet in straight sets. She defeated Iga Świątek also in straight sets in the semifinals to advance to her first Grand Slam final, where she faced world No. 1, Ashleigh Barty. Świątek said that Collins hits "the fastest ball I have ever played against in a match." In the final, Collins lost in straight sets despite being 5–1 up in the second set. As a result of her performance, Collins made her top-10 debut and became the American No. 1 female player. At the French Open, she lost to fellow American Shelby Rogers, in straight sets, in the second round. In Wimbledon, Collins lost in the first round to Marie Bouzková, in three sets. At the same tournament, partnering Desirae Krawczyk, she reached the quarterfinals for a second time and then the semifinals for the first time at a major in doubles in her career.

Seeded 19th at the US Open, she reached the round of 16 for the first time upon defeating two-time US Open champion Naomi Osaka, Cristina Bucșa, and Alizé Cornet. In the fourth round, she lost to world No. 6 and eventual semifinalist Aryna Sabalenka in three sets.

=== 2023: First WTA Tour doubles title ===
Collins started her 2023 season in Adelaide. Seeded fifth at the first tournament, she lost in the first round to Elena Rybakina, in three sets. Seeded 10th at the second tournament, she reached the quarterfinals where she was defeated by sixth seed and world No. 9, Veronika Kudermetova, in three sets, despite having five match points during the match. Seeded 13th as the prior year's finalist at the Australian Open, she beat Anna Kalinskaya in the first round. In the second round, she outlasted Karolína Muchová in a two-hour-and-56-minute three-set marathon match. In the third round, she lost to 22nd seed and eventual finalist, Elena Rybakina, in three sets. Due to not defending her finalist points earned in 2022, Collins's ranking fell from 11 to 40 after the Australian Open.

In the beginning of February, at the Abu Dhabi Open, Collins was defeated in the first round by fifth seed and world No. 12, Jeļena Ostapenko, in three sets. At the Qatar Ladies Open, she suffered a second-round thrashing at the hands of defending champion, world No. 1, and eventual champion, Iga Świątek, winning only one game. In Dubai, she fell in the first round to 17-year-old Linda Fruhvirtová. Seeded fourth at the inaugural edition of the ATX Open in Austin, Texas she reached the semifinals where she lost to eighth seed, Marta Kostyuk, who would end up winning her first WTA Tour singles title. At the Indian Wells Open, she was defeated in the first round by lucky loser Dalma Gálfi. Seeded 30th at the Miami Open, she lost in the third round to third seed Jessica Pegula.

Collins started her clay-court season in April at the Charleston Open. Seeded 13th, she lost in the first round to Shelby Rogers. In doubles, she won her first WTA Tour doubles title alongside compatriot Desirae Krawczyk, beating top seeds Giuliana Olmos and Ena Shibahara in the final. She withdrew from both the Madrid Open and the Italian Open. Returning to action at the French Open, she was defeated in the first round by third seed Jessica Pegula.

=== 2024: Two titles, top 10, retirement U-turn ===
After her loss to world No. 1, Iga Świątek, at the Australian Open, Collins announced that 2024 would be her last year of playing professional tennis.

At the Abu Dhabi Open where she qualified for the main draw, she defeated former No. 1, wildcard entrant Naomi Osaka, in straight sets. The following week, she also qualified for the WTA 1000 Qatar Ladies Open and reached the quarterfinals, defeating 13th seed Veronika Kudermetova, and Czechs Marie Bouzková and Kateřina Siniaková. In the quarterfinals, Collins lost to Anastasia Pavlyuchenkova in straight sets. In Indian Wells, Collins defeated Russian qualifier Erika Andreeva and then lost to Iga Świątek in the second round.

In Miami, she reached the quarterfinals for the third time at this tournament, with wins over Bernarda Pera, Russians 30th seed Anastasia Potapova and Elina Avanesyan, and 19th seed Sorana Cirstea. She reached her second career WTA 1000 semifinal (after 2018 Miami) with a straight-set win against Caroline Garcia, increasing the head-to-head to 4–0. In the semifinals, she then defeated 14th seed Ekaterina Alexandrova, also in straight sets, to advance to her first WTA 1000 final. Ranked No. 53, she became the second lowest-ranked finalist in Miami behind only Naomi Osaka, and the fourth-oldest first-time WTA 1000 finalist since the category was introduced in 2009. She secured her inaugural WTA 1000 title with a decisive victory in straight sets over Elena Rybakina, the fourth seed and previous year's runner-up. This historic win marked her as the lowest-ranked champion, only the second unseeded woman to achieve the feat, and the third woman to claim her maiden singles title in Miami after turning 30 years old, following Chris Evert (1986) and Petra Kvitová (2023), since the tournament's inception in 1985. Additionally, she joined the champions list as the sixth American to triumph in Miami. As a result, she returned to the top 25 in the rankings, at No. 22.

Unseeded again at the Charleston Open, she defeated Paula Badosa, and second seed and defending champion Ons Jabeur. Next, she defeated Sloane Stephens (her second match in one day), 11th seed Elise Mertens, and world No. 7 and third seed, Maria Sakkari, all in straight sets, to reach the final, extending her record to 12 consecutive match wins. She lifted her second straight singles trophy in two weeks and fourth overall, defeating fourth seed Daria Kasatkina in straight sets. This marked her 22nd win since the beginning of the season, and tied her for the most wins with Świątek and Rybakina. She became the first player to win back-to-back titles in Miami and Charleston since Serena Williams in 2013. With the title, she returned to the top 15 on April 8, 2024.

In Madrid, Collins continued her winning streak to 15 matches, securing victories over qualifiers Olga Danilović and Jaqueline Cristian. However, her streak ended in the fourth round when she was defeated by world No. 2, Aryna Sabalenka, in three sets. Seeded 13th at the Italian Open, she reached her maiden WTA 1000 clay-court semifinal without dropping a set, with wins over Anna Blinkova by retirement, 22nd seed Caroline Garcia, Irina-Camelia Begu and 24th seed Victoria Azarenka. Her run was once again halted by Aryna Sabalenka, this time in straight sets. At the WTA 500 in Strasbourg, she advanced to her third final of the season, defeating Kateřina Siniaková, Clara Burel, and Anhelina Kalinina. In an All-American final, she lost to fourth seed Madison Keys in straight sets. As a result, she returned to the top 10 for the first time since August 2022. At the French Open, she was upset in the second round by qualifier Olga Danilović.

Seeded 11th at Wimbledon, she defeated Clara Tauson, Dalma Gálfi and 20th seed Beatriz Haddad Maia to reach the round-of-16 at the grass-court major for the first time before losing to eventual champion Barbora Krejčíková.

Collins reached the quarterfinals at the Paris Olympics but retired due to injury while trailing in the third set of her match with world number one Iga Świątek.

At the US Open, she lost in the first round to Caroline Dolehide. Collins also lost her opening match at the Guadalajara Open to Olivia Gadecki.

In October, Collins announced she had changed her mind about retiring and would play on in 2025.

=== 2025: Strasbourg semifinal ===
Collins defeated qualifiers Daria Snigur and Destanee Aiava to reach the third round at the Australian Open, where she lost to 10th seed and eventual champion Madison Keys.

In March, seeking to defend her title at the Miami Open, she overcame Sorana Cîrstea and qualifier Rebeka Masarova, before losing to world No.1 and eventual champion, Aryna Sabalenka.

At the Charleston Open, again as defending champion and seeded seventh, Collins reached the quarterfinals with wins over Robin Montgomery and 11th seed Jeļena Ostapenko, before losing in the last eight to top seed Jessica Pegula, in three sets.

In May at the Strasbourg Open, she defeated Sofia Kenin and wildcard entrant Emma Raducanu, before being given a walkover into the semifinals when her scheduled opponent, Anna Kalinskaya, withdrew due to injury. Collins lost in the last four to eighth seed Liudmila Samsonova.

Now ranked outside the world's top-32 and therefore unseeded, Collins reached the third round at Wimbledon, at which point she lost to eighth seed and eventual champion Iga Świątek, in straight sets.

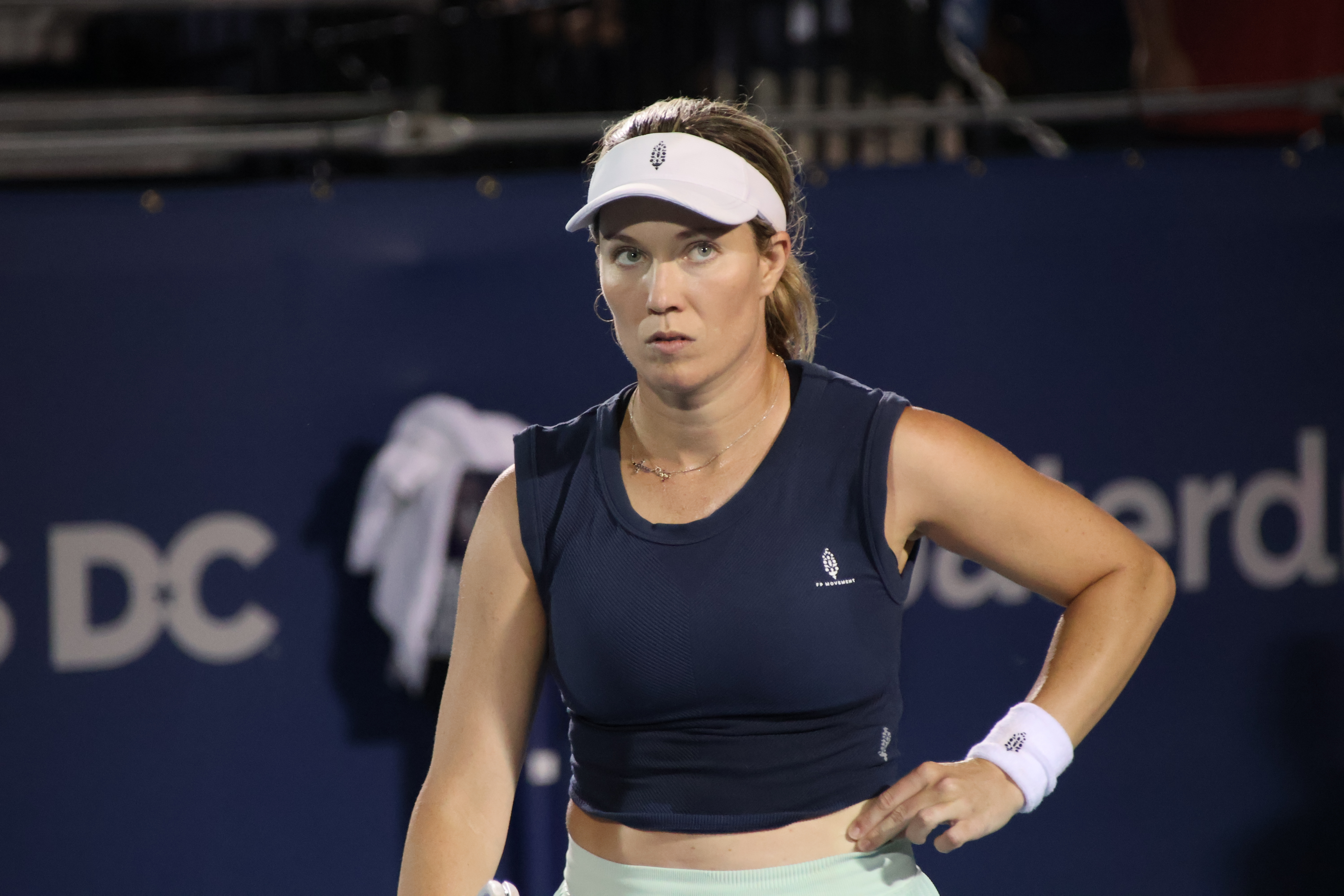
Collins at the 2025 DC Open

At the US Open, she lost in the first round to Jaqueline Cristian, in straight sets.

== World TeamTennis ==
Collins played her first season with World TeamTennis in 2019 with Billie Jean King's Philadelphia Freedoms. She started the 2020 season on the Orlando Storm roster which began July 12, but was dismissed from the league after leaving the state and breaching COVID-19 safety protocols.

== Playing style ==
Collins employs a highly aggressive playing style that has been described as "fearless," "ferocious," and "fun to watch."

== Career statistics ==
=== Grand Slam tournament performance timelines ===
Key
W	F	SF	QF	#R	RR	Q#	P#	DNQ	A	Z#	PO	G	S	B	NMS	NTI	P	NH

(W) winner; (F) finalist; (SF) semifinalist; (QF) quarterfinalist; (#R) rounds 4, 3, 2, 1; (RR) round-robin stage; (Q#) qualification round; (P#) preliminary round; (DNQ) did not qualify; (A) absent; (Z#) Davis/Fed Cup Zonal Group (with number indication) or (PO) play-off; (G) gold, (S) silver or (B) bronze Olympic/Paralympic medal; (NMS) not a Masters tournament; (NTI) not a Tier I tournament; (P) postponed; (NH) not held; (SR) strike rate (events won / competed); (W–L) win–loss record.
To avoid confusion and double counting, these charts are updated at the conclusion of a tournament or when the player's participation has ended.

==== Singles ====
Current through the 2025 US Open.

Tournament	2014	2015	2016	2017	2018	2019	2020	2021	2022	2023	2024	2025	SR	W–L	Win %
Australian Open	A	A	A	A	Q3	SF	2R	2R	F	3R	2R	3R	0 / 7	18–7	72%
French Open	A	A	A	A	1R	2R	QF	3R	2R	1R	2R	2R	0 / 8	10–8	56%
Wimbledon	A	A	A	Q1	1R	3R	NH	2R	1R	2R	4R	3R	0 / 7	9–7	56%
US Open	1R	A	1R	Q1	1R	2R	1R	3R	4R	2R	1R	1R	0 / 10	7–10	41%
Win–loss	0–1	0–0	0–1	0–0	0–3	9–4	5–3	6–4	10–4	4–4	5–4	5–4	0 / 32	44–32	58%

==== Doubles ====
Tournament	2018	2019	2020	2021	2022	2023	2024	2025	SR	W–L	Win%
Australian Open	A	1R	2R (Note: Withdrew before second-round match. Not counted as a loss.)	A	3R	1R	1R	1R	0 / 6	3–5	38%
French Open	A	2R	A	1R	1R	1R	A	A	0 / 4	1–4	20%
Wimbledon	1R	QF	NH	A	SF	1R	A	A	0 / 4	6–4	60%
US Open	2R	3R	A	A	A	2R	A	A	0 / 3	4–3	57%
Win–loss	1–2	5–4	1–0	0–1	6–3	1–4	0–1	0–1	0 / 17	14–16	47%

=== Grand Slam tournament finals ===
==== Singles: 1 (runner-up) ====
Result	Year	Tournament	Surface	Opponent	Score
Loss	2022	Australian Open	Hard	(Australia) Ashleigh Barty	3–6, 6–7^{(2–7)}
