= 2018 Fuzion 100 Ilkley Trophy – Men's doubles =

Men's doubles
- 2018 Fuzion 100 Ilkley Trophy

Final
- Champions: (United States) Austin Krajicek (India) Jeevan Nedunchezhiyan
- Runners-up: (Germany) Kevin Krawietz (Germany) Andreas Mies
- Score: 6–3, 6–3

Events
Singles	men	women
Doubles	men	women
← 2017 ·	Fuzion 100 Ilkley Trophy	· 2019 →

Leander Paes and Adil Shamasdin were the defending champions but chose not to defend their title.

Austin Krajicek and Jeevan Nedunchezhiyan won the title after defeating Kevin Krawietz and Andreas Mies 6–3, 6–3 in the final.

== Seeds ==
1. (El Salvador) Marcelo Arévalo / (Chile) Hans Podlipnik-Castillo (first round)
2. (Argentina) Andrés Molteni / (Mexico) Miguel Ángel Reyes-Varela (first round)
3. (India) Purav Raja / (Australia) John-Patrick Smith (quarterfinals)
4. (France) Jonathan Eysseric / (France) Hugo Nys (quarterfinals)

== Draw ==
=== Key ===
- Q = Qualifier
- WC = Wild card
- LL = Lucky loser
- Alt = Alternate
- SE = Special exempt
- PR = Protected ranking
- ITF = ITF entry
- JE = Junior exempt
- w/o = Walkover
- r = Retired
- d = Defaulted
- SR = Special ranking

First round
1	(El Salvador) M Arévalo (Chile) H Podlipnik-Castillo	3	3
(Denmark) F Nielsen (United Kingdom) J Salisbury	6	6
(United States) A Krajicek (India) J Nedunchezhiyan	6	6
(Poland) H Hurkacz (United States) E King	4	4
3	(India) P Raja (Australia) J-P Smith	6	6
(Canada) P Polansky (Australia) M Reid	1	4
(Thailand) Sa Ratiwatana (Thailand) So Ratiwatana	6^{6}	4
WC	(United Kingdom) L Broady (United Kingdom) S Clayton	7^{8}	6
(India) S Balaji (India) V Vardhan	4	6	[10]
(United Kingdom) L Bambridge (United Kingdom) J O'Mara	6	3	[7]
WC	(United Kingdom) Jack Findel-Hawkins (United Kingdom) L Johnson	6^{4}	6^{3}
4	(France) J Eysseric (France) H Nys	7^{7}	7^{7}
(Australia) A Bolt (Australia) J Thompson	6^{7}	6	[6]
(Belarus) A Bury (Chinese Taipei) H-y Peng	7^{9}	3	[10]
(Germany) K Krawietz (Germany) A Mies	6	7^{11}
2	(Argentina) A Molteni (Mexico) MÁ Reyes-Varela	4	6^{9}

Quarterfinals
(Denmark) F Nielsen (United Kingdom) J Salisbury	3	6^{7}
(United States) A Krajicek (India) J Nedunchezhiyan	6	7^{9}
3	(India) P Raja (Australia) J-P Smith	3	6^{6}
WC	(United Kingdom) L Broady (United Kingdom) S Clayton	6	7^{8}
(India) S Balaji (India) V Vardhan	6	7^{7}
4	(France) J Eysseric (France) H Nys	3	6^{4}
(Belarus) A Bury (Chinese Taipei) H-y Peng	6^{9}	7^{11}	[9]
(Germany) K Krawietz (Germany) A Mies	7^{11}	6^{9}	[11]

Semifinals
(United States) A Krajicek (India) J Nedunchezhiyan	7	6
WC	(United Kingdom) L Broady (United Kingdom) S Clayton	5	3
(India) S Balaji (India) V Vardhan	6^{2}	6^{4}
(Germany) K Krawietz (Germany) A Mies	7^{7}	7^{7}

Final
(United States) A Krajicek (India) J Nedunchezhiyan	6	6
(Germany) K Krawietz (Germany) A Mies	3	3
