= 2018 Birmingham Classic – Doubles =

Doubles
- 2018 Birmingham Classic

Final
- Champions: (Hungary) Tímea Babos (France) Kristina Mladenovic
- Runners-up: (Belgium) Elise Mertens (Netherlands) Demi Schuurs
- Score: 4–6, 6–3, [10–8]

Details
- Draw: 16 (2WC)
- Seeds: 4

Events
Singles	Doubles
- Birmingham Classic

Ashleigh Barty and Casey Dellacqua were the defending champions, but Dellacqua retired from professional tennis in February 2018. Barty played alongside CoCo Vandeweghe, but lost in the first round to Tímea Babos and Kristina Mladenovic.

Babos and Mladenovic went on to win the title, defeating Elise Mertens and Demi Schuurs in the final, 4–6, 6–3, [10–8].

== Seeds ==
1. (Hungary) Tímea Babos / (France) Kristina Mladenovic (champions)
2. (Czech Republic) Andrea Sestini Hlaváčková / (Czech Republic) Barbora Strýcová (first round)
3. (Chinese Taipei) Latisha Chan / (Canada) Gabriela Dabrowski (first round)
4. (Czech Republic) Barbora Krejčíková / (Czech Republic) Kateřina Siniaková (semifinals)

== Draw ==
Key

- Q = Qualifier
- WC = Wild card
- LL = Lucky loser
- Alt = Alternate
- ITF = ITF entry
- PR = Protected ranking
- SR = Special ranking
- SE = Special exempt
- JE = Junior exempt
- JR = Junior Accelerator Programme entrant
- CO = College Accelerator Programme entrant
- NG = Next Gen Accelerator Program entrant
- w/o = Walkover
- r = Retired
- d = Defaulted

=== Draw ===
First round
1	(Hungary) T Babos (France) K Mladenovic	7^{7}	6
(Australia) A Barty (United States) C Vandeweghe	6^{4}	3
WC	(Canada) E Bouchard (Slovakia) D Cibulková	6	2	[8]
(United States) V King (Slovenia) K Srebotnik	2	6	[10]
4	(Czech Republic) B Krejčíková (Czech Republic) K Siniaková	6	6
(Germany) J Görges (Czech Republic) Ka Plíšková	4	4
(Ukraine) L Kichenok (Russia) A Kudryavtseva	3	6	[4]
WC	(United Kingdom) K Boulter (United Kingdom) H Watson	6	4	[10]
(Japan) S Aoyama (Romania) R Olaru	3	6	[7]
(Belgium) E Mertens (Netherlands) D Schuurs	6	2	[10]
(Chinese Taipei) H-c Chan (China) Z Yang	6	3	[10]
3	(Chinese Taipei) L Chan (Canada) G Dabrowski	4	6	[5]
(United States) N Melichar (Czech Republic) K Peschke	7^{7}	6
(United States) R Atawo (Germany) A-L Grönefeld	6^{3}	2
(Russia) D Kasatkina (Spain) G Muguruza	2	6	[10]
2	(Czech Republic) A Sestini Hlaváčková (Czech Republic) B Strýcová	6	4	[7]

Quarterfinals
1	(Hungary) T Babos (France) K Mladenovic	6	7
(United States) V King (Slovenia) K Srebotnik	4	5
4	(Czech Republic) B Krejčíková (Czech Republic) K Siniaková	6	6
WC	(United Kingdom) K Boulter (United Kingdom) H Watson	2	0
(Belgium) E Mertens (Netherlands) D Schuurs	6	7^{7}
(Chinese Taipei) H-c Chan (China) Z Yang	3	6^{3}
(United States) N Melichar (Czech Republic) K Peschke	1	7^{7}	[14]
(Russia) D Kasatkina (Spain) G Muguruza	6	6^{5}	[12]

Semifinals
1	(Hungary) T Babos (France) K Mladenovic	7	7^{8}
4	(Czech Republic) B Krejčíková (Czech Republic) K Siniaková	5	6^{6}
(Belgium) E Mertens (Netherlands) D Schuurs	6	2	[10]
(United States) N Melichar (Czech Republic) K Peschke	3	6	[7]

Final
1	(Hungary) T Babos (France) K Mladenovic	4	6	[10]
(Belgium) E Mertens (Netherlands) D Schuurs	6	3	[8]
