= 2018 WTA Premier tournaments =

Set of elite women's tennis tournaments

The 2018 WTA Premier tournaments are 21 of the tennis tournaments on the 2018 WTA Tour. The WTA Tour is the elite tour for women's professional tennis. The WTA Premier tournaments rank below the Grand Slam events and above the WTA International tournaments. They are divided into three levels: Premier Mandatory (Indian Wells, Miami, Madrid and Beijing), Premier 5 (Doha, Rome, Canada, Cincinnati and Wuhan), and Premier (12 tournaments in Europe, United States and Australia).

== Schedule ==
=== Premier ===
Week of	Tournament	Champions	Runners-up	Semifinalists	Quarterfinalists	Ref
1 January	Brisbane International; Brisbane, Australia	(Ukraine) Elina Svitolina; 6–2, 6–1	(Belarus) Aliaksandra Sasnovich	(Latvia) Anastasija Sevastova (Czech Republic) Karolína Plíšková	(Serbia) Aleksandra Krunić (France) Alizé Cornet (United Kingdom) Johanna Konta (Estonia) Kaia Kanepi	
1 January	Brisbane International; Brisbane, Australia	(Netherlands) Kiki Bertens (Netherlands) Demi Schuurs; 7–5, 6–2	(Slovenia) Andreja Klepač (Spain) María José Martínez Sánchez	(Latvia) Anastasija Sevastova (Czech Republic) Karolína Plíšková	(Serbia) Aleksandra Krunić (France) Alizé Cornet (United Kingdom) Johanna Konta (Estonia) Kaia Kanepi	
8 January	Sydney International; Sydney, Australia	(Germany) Angelique Kerber; 6–4, 6–4	(Australia) Ashleigh Barty	(Australia) Daria Gavrilova (Italy) Camila Giorgi	(Spain) Garbiñe Muguruza (Czech Republic) Barbora Strýcová (Poland) Agnieszka Radwańska (Slovakia) Dominika Cibulková	
8 January	Sydney International; Sydney, Australia	(Canada) Gabriela Dabrowski (China) Xu Yifan; 6–3, 6–1	(Chinese Taipei) Latisha Chan (Czech Republic) Andrea Sestini Hlaváčková	(Australia) Daria Gavrilova (Italy) Camila Giorgi	(Spain) Garbiñe Muguruza (Czech Republic) Barbora Strýcová (Poland) Agnieszka Radwańska (Slovakia) Dominika Cibulková	
29 January	St. Petersburg Ladies' Trophy; St. Petersburg, Russia	(Czech Republic) Petra Kvitová; 6–1, 6–2	(France) Kristina Mladenovic	(Russia) Daria Kasatkina (Germany) Julia Görges	(Denmark) Caroline Wozniacki (Czech Republic) Kateřina Siniaková (Russia) Elena Rybakina (Latvia) Jeļena Ostapenko	
29 January	St. Petersburg Ladies' Trophy; St. Petersburg, Russia	(Switzerland) Timea Bacsinszky (Russia) Vera Zvonareva; 2–6, 6–1, [10–3]	(Russia) Alla Kudryavtseva (Slovenia) Katarina Srebotnik	(Russia) Daria Kasatkina (Germany) Julia Görges	(Denmark) Caroline Wozniacki (Czech Republic) Kateřina Siniaková (Russia) Elena Rybakina (Latvia) Jeļena Ostapenko	
19 February	Dubai Tennis Championships; Dubai, UAE	(Ukraine) Elina Svitolina; 6–4, 6–0	(Russia) Daria Kasatkina	(Germany) Angelique Kerber (Spain) Garbiñe Muguruza	(Japan) Naomi Osaka (Czech Republic) Karolína Plíšková (Russia) Elena Vesnina (France) Caroline Garcia	
19 February	Dubai Tennis Championships; Dubai, UAE	(Chinese Taipei) Chan Hao-ching (China) Yang Zhaoxuan; 4–6, 6–2, [10–6]	(Chinese Taipei) Hsieh Su-wei (China) Peng Shuai	(Germany) Angelique Kerber (Spain) Garbiñe Muguruza	(Japan) Naomi Osaka (Czech Republic) Karolína Plíšková (Russia) Elena Vesnina (France) Caroline Garcia	
2 April	Volvo Car Open; Charleston, USA	(Netherlands) Kiki Bertens; 6–2, 6–1	(Germany) Julia Görges	(United States) Madison Keys (Latvia) Anastasija Sevastova	(France) Alizé Cornet (United States) Bernarda Pera (Russia) Daria Kasatkina (Czech Republic) Kristýna Plíšková	
2 April	Volvo Car Open; Charleston, USA	(Russia) Alla Kudryavtseva (Slovenia) Katarina Srebotnik; 6–3, 6–3	(Slovenia) Andreja Klepač (Spain) María José Martínez Sánchez	(United States) Madison Keys (Latvia) Anastasija Sevastova	(France) Alizé Cornet (United States) Bernarda Pera (Russia) Daria Kasatkina (Czech Republic) Kristýna Plíšková	
23 April	Porsche Tennis Grand Prix; Stuttgart, Germany	(Czech Republic) Karolína Plíšková; 7–6^{(7–2)}, 6–4	(United States) CoCo Vandeweghe	(France) Caroline Garcia (Estonia) Anett Kontaveit	(Romania) Simona Halep (Ukraine) Elina Svitolina (Latvia) Jeļena Ostapenko (Russia) Anastasia Pavlyuchenkova	
23 April	Porsche Tennis Grand Prix; Stuttgart, Germany	(United States) Raquel Atawo (Germany) Anna-Lena Grönefeld; 6–4, 6–7^{(5–7)}, [10–5]	(United States) Nicole Melichar (Czech Republic) Květa Peschke	(France) Caroline Garcia (Estonia) Anett Kontaveit	(Romania) Simona Halep (Ukraine) Elina Svitolina (Latvia) Jeļena Ostapenko (Russia) Anastasia Pavlyuchenkova	
18 June	Birmingham Classic; Birmingham, UK	(Czech Republic) Petra Kvitová; 4–6, 6–1, 6–2	(Slovakia) Magdaléna Rybáriková	(Czech Republic) Barbora Strýcová (Romania) Mihaela Buzărnescu	(Ukraine) Lesia Tsurenko (Slovenia) Dalila Jakupović (Germany) Julia Görges (Ukraine) Elina Svitolina	
18 June	Birmingham Classic; Birmingham, UK	(Hungary) Tímea Babos (France) Kristina Mladenovic; 4–6, 6–3, [10–8]	(Belgium) Elise Mertens (Netherlands) Demi Schuurs	(Czech Republic) Barbora Strýcová (Romania) Mihaela Buzărnescu	(Ukraine) Lesia Tsurenko (Slovenia) Dalila Jakupović (Germany) Julia Görges (Ukraine) Elina Svitolina	
25 June	Eastbourne International; Eastbourne, UK	(Denmark) Caroline Wozniacki; 7–5, 7–6^{(7–5)}	(Belarus) Aryna Sabalenka	(Germany) Angelique Kerber (Poland) Agnieszka Radwańska	(Australia) Ashleigh Barty (Russia) Daria Kasatkina (Latvia) Jeļena Ostapenko (Czech Republic) Karolína Plíšková	
25 June	Eastbourne International; Eastbourne, UK	(Canada) Gabriela Dabrowski (China) Xu Yifan; 6–3, 7–5	(Romania) Irina-Camelia Begu (Romania) Mihaela Buzărnescu	(Germany) Angelique Kerber (Poland) Agnieszka Radwańska	(Australia) Ashleigh Barty (Russia) Daria Kasatkina (Latvia) Jeļena Ostapenko (Czech Republic) Karolína Plíšková	
30 July	Silicon Valley Classic; San Jose, USA	(Romania) Mihaela Buzărnescu; 6–1, 6–0	(Greece) Maria Sakkari	(United States) Danielle Collins (Belgium) Elise Mertens	(Belarus) Victoria Azarenka (United States) Venus Williams (United Kingdom) Johanna Konta (Australia) Ajla Tomljanović	
30 July	Silicon Valley Classic; San Jose, USA	(Chinese Taipei) Latisha Chan (Czech Republic) Květa Peschke; 6–4, 6–1	(Ukraine) Lyudmyla Kichenok (Ukraine) Nadiia Kichenok	(United States) Danielle Collins (Belgium) Elise Mertens	(Belarus) Victoria Azarenka (United States) Venus Williams (United Kingdom) Johanna Konta (Australia) Ajla Tomljanović	
20 August	Connecticut Open; New Haven, USA	(Belarus) Aryna Sabalenka; 6–1, 6–4	(Spain) Carla Suárez Navarro	(Germany) Julia Görges (Puerto Rico) Monica Puig	(Switzerland) Belinda Bencic (Russia) Ekaterina Makarova (Czech Republic) Petra Kvitová (France) Caroline Garcia	
20 August	Connecticut Open; New Haven, USA	(Czech Republic) Andrea Sestini Hlaváčková (Czech Republic) Barbora Strýcová; 6–4, 6–7^{(7–9)}, [10–4]	(Chinese Taipei) Hsieh Su-wei (Germany) Laura Siegemund	(Germany) Julia Görges (Puerto Rico) Monica Puig	(Switzerland) Belinda Bencic (Russia) Ekaterina Makarova (Czech Republic) Petra Kvitová (France) Caroline Garcia	
17 September	Toray Pan Pacific Open; Tokyo, Japan	(Czech Republic) Karolína Plíšková; 6–4, 6–4	(Japan) Naomi Osaka	(Italy) Camila Giorgi (Croatia) Donna Vekić	(Belarus) Victoria Azarenka (Czech Republic) Barbora Strýcová (United States) Alison Riske (France) Caroline Garcia	
17 September	Toray Pan Pacific Open; Tokyo, Japan	(Japan) Miyu Kato (Japan) Makoto Ninomiya; 6–4, 6–4	(Czech Republic) Andrea Sestini Hlaváčková (Czech Republic) Barbora Strýcová	(Italy) Camila Giorgi (Croatia) Donna Vekić	(Belarus) Victoria Azarenka (Czech Republic) Barbora Strýcová (United States) Alison Riske (France) Caroline Garcia	
15 October	Kremlin Cup; Moscow, Russia	(Russia) Daria Kasatkina; 2–6, 7–6^{(7–3)}, 6–4	(Tunisia) Ons Jabeur	(United Kingdom) Johanna Konta (Latvia) Anastasija Sevastova	(Russia) Anastasia Pavlyuchenkova (Belarus) Aliaksandra Sasnovich (Estonia) Anett Kontaveit (Russia) Vera Zvonareva	
15 October	Kremlin Cup; Moscow, Russia	(Russia) Alexandra Panova (Germany) Laura Siegemund; 6–2, 7–6^{(7–2)}	(Croatia) Darija Jurak (Romania) Raluca Olaru	(United Kingdom) Johanna Konta (Latvia) Anastasija Sevastova	(Russia) Anastasia Pavlyuchenkova (Belarus) Aliaksandra Sasnovich (Estonia) Anett Kontaveit (Russia) Vera Zvonareva	
