= 2019 Ilkley Trophy – Women's doubles =

Women's doubles
- 2019 Ilkley Trophy

Final
- Champions: (Brazil) Beatriz Haddad Maia (Brazil) Luisa Stefani
- Runners-up: (Australia) Ellen Perez (Australia) Arina Rodionova
- Score: 6–4, 6–7^{(5–7)}, [10–4]

Events
Singles	men	women
Doubles	men	women
← 2018 ·	Ilkley Trophy	· 2022 →

Asia Muhammad and Maria Sanchez were the defending champions, but lost in the semifinals to Ellen Perez and Arina Rodionova.

Beatriz Haddad Maia and Luisa Stefani won the title, defeating Perez and Rodionova 6–4, 6–7^{(5–7)}, [10–4], in the final.

== Seeds ==
1. (Romania) Irina-Camelia Begu / (Romania) Monica Niculescu (quarterfinals, withdrew)
2. (United States) Asia Muhammad / (United States) Maria Sanchez (semifinals)
3. (Australia) Ellen Perez / (Australia) Arina Rodionova (final)
4. (Russia) Anna Blinkova / (China) Peng Shuai (semifinals)

== Draw ==
=== Key ===
- Q = Qualifier
- WC = Wild card
- LL = Lucky loser
- Alt = Alternate
- SE = Special exempt
- PR = Protected ranking
- ITF = ITF entry
- JE = Junior exempt
- w/o = Walkover
- r = Retired
- d = Defaulted
- SR = Special ranking

=== Draw ===
First round
1	(Romania) I-C Begu (Romania) M Niculescu	4	6	[11]
(Netherlands) L Kerkhove (United States) W Osuigwe	6	4	[9]
WC	(United Kingdom) N Bains (United Kingdom) M Lumsden	3	6	[7]
(Brazil) B Haddad Maia (Brazil) L Stefani	6	2	[10]
4	(Russia) A Blinkova (China) S Peng	6	6
(Japan) N Hibino (Belgium) Y Wickmayer	4	2
(Canada) S Fichman (Russia) V Savinykh	3	2
(China) Y Duan (China) L Zhu	6	6
(China) X Jiang (China) Q Tang	6^{2}	3
(Sweden) C Lister (Switzerland) C Perrin	7^{7}	6
(United States) C Dolehide (United States) E Shibahara	1	3
3	(Australia) E Perez (Australia) Ar Rodionova	6	6
(Serbia) O Danilović (Serbia) I Jorović	4	6	[4]
(United States) M Brengle (United States) I Neel	6	4	[10]
WC	(United Kingdom) O Nicholls (United Kingdom) K Swan	6	4	[8]
2	(United States) A Muhammad (United States) M Sanchez	2	6	[10]

Quarterfinals
1	(Romania) I-C Begu (Romania) M Niculescu
(Brazil) B Haddad Maia (Brazil) L Stefani	w/o
4	(Russia) A Blinkova (China) S Peng	w/o
(China) Y Duan (China) L Zhu
(Sweden) C Lister (Switzerland) C Perrin	5	0
3	(Australia) E Perez (Australia) Ar Rodionova	7	6
(United States) M Brengle (United States) I Neel	4	6^{4}
2	(United States) A Muhammad (United States) M Sanchez	6	7^{7}

Semifinals
(Brazil) B Haddad Maia (Brazil) L Stefani	7^{7}	6
4	(Russia) A Blinkova (China) S Peng	6^{4}	3
3	(Australia) E Perez (Australia) Ar Rodionova	6	6^{4}	[10]
2	(United States) A Muhammad (United States) M Sanchez	2	7^{7}	[7]

Final
(Brazil) B Haddad Maia (Brazil) L Stefani	6	6^{5}	[10]
3	(Australia) E Perez (Australia) Ar Rodionova	4	7^{7}	[4]
