= 2019 Ilkley Trophy – Women's singles =

Women's singles
- 2019 Ilkley Trophy

Final
- Champion: (Romania) Monica Niculescu
- Runner-up: (Hungary) Tímea Babos
- Score: 6–2, 4–6, 6–3

Events
Singles	men	women
Doubles	men	women
← 2018 ·	Ilkley Trophy	· 2022 →

Tereza Smitková was the defending champion but lost in the quarterfinals to Monica Niculescu.

Niculescu went on to win the title, defeating Tímea Babos in the final, 6–2, 4–6, 6–3.

== Seeds ==
1. (Slovakia) Magdaléna Rybáriková (second round)
2. (France) Pauline Parmentier (first round)
3. (Russia) Anna Blinkova (quarterfinals)
4. (Poland) Magda Linette (second round)
5. (United States) Madison Brengle (first round)
6. (Serbia) Ivana Jorović (first round)
7. (China) Zhu Lin (second round)
8. (Thailand) Luksika Kumkhum (first round)

== Draw ==
=== Key ===
- Q = Qualifier
- WC = Wild card
- LL = Lucky loser
- Alt = Alternate
- SE = Special exempt
- PR = Protected ranking
- ITF = ITF entry
- JE = Junior exempt
- w/o = Walkover
- r = Retired
- d = Defaulted
- SR = Special ranking

=== Finals ===
Semifinals
(Hungary) Tímea Babos	7	6
(Netherlands) Bibiane Schoofs	5	3
Q	(Slovakia) Jana Čepelová	4	6	4
(Romania) Monica Niculescu	6	0	6

Final
(Hungary) Tímea Babos	2	6	3
(Romania) Monica Niculescu	6	4	6

=== Top half ===
First round
1	(Slovakia) M Rybáriková	7^{7}	6
(Switzerland) C Perrin	6^{5}	2
(Brazil) B Haddad Maia	7	6
(United States) A Li	5	2
(Hungary) T Babos	6	7^{7}
Q	(Netherlands) L Kerkhove	3	6^{4}
(United States) W Osuigwe	4	3
7	(China) L Zhu	6	6
3	(Russia) A Blinkova	6	6
(Romania) I-C Begu	2	3
(Serbia) O Danilović	7^{9}	2	4
Q	(Italy) M Di Giuseppe	6^{7}	6	6
(Belgium) Y Wickmayer	6	4	6
(China) S Peng	1	6	1
(Netherlands) B Schoofs	1	7^{7}	6
5	(United States) M Brengle	6	6^{5}	3

Second round
1	(Slovakia) M Rybáriková	5	5
(Brazil) B Haddad Maia	7	7
(Hungary) T Babos	6	6
7	(China) L Zhu	1	0
3	(Russia) A Blinkova	3	6	6
Q	(Italy) M Di Giuseppe	6	3	4
(Belgium) Y Wickmayer	2	6^{6}
(Netherlands) B Schoofs	6	7^{8}

Quarterfinals
(Brazil) B Haddad Maia	6^{9}	6	4
(Hungary) T Babos	7^{11}	4	6
3	(Russia) A Blinkova	6	6^{4}	4
(Netherlands) B Schoofs	4	7^{7}	6

Semifinals
(Hungary) T Babos	7	6
(Netherlands) B Schoofs	5	3

=== Bottom half ===
First round
6	(Serbia) I Jorović	4	4
Q	(Slovakia) J Čepelová	6	6
(Russia) V Flink	6	6
WC	(United Kingdom) M Lumsden	3	1
(China) Xiy Wang	6	2	2
Q	(Paraguay) V Cepede Royg	4	6	6
(Japan) N Hibino	4	6	4
4	(Poland) M Linette	6	3	6
8	(Thailand) L Kumkhum	6	3	3
(Romania) M Niculescu	1	6	6
Q	(United States) R Anderson	4	7^{7}	6
Q	(Ukraine) M Kostyuk	6	6^{0}	2
WC	(United Kingdom) G Taylor	3	5
(Czech Republic) T Smitková	6	7
WC	(United Kingdom) K Swan	7^{7}	6
2	(France) P Parmentier	6^{4}	4

Second round
Q	(Slovakia) J Čepelová	6	6
(Russia) V Flink	4	1
Q	(Paraguay) V Cepede Royg	7	6
4	(Poland) M Linette	5	3
(Romania) M Niculescu	3	6	6
Q	(United States) R Anderson	6	1	2
(Czech Republic) T Smitková	3	6	7
WC	(United Kingdom) K Swan	6	4	5

Quarterfinals
Q	(Slovakia) J Čepelová	6	7^{7}
Q	(Paraguay) V Cepede Royg	4	6^{3}
(Romania) M Niculescu	6	6
(Czech Republic) T Smitková	4	3

Semifinals
Q	(Slovakia) J Čepelová	4	6	4
(Romania) M Niculescu	6	0	6
