= 2019 Ilkley Trophy – Men's singles =

Men's singles
- 2019 Ilkley Trophy

Final
- Champion: (Germany) Dominik Köpfer
- Runner-up: (Austria) Dennis Novak
- Score: 3–6, 6–3, 7–6^{(7–5)}

Events
Singles	men	women
Doubles	men	women
← 2018 ·	Ilkley Trophy	· 2022 →

Sergiy Stakhovsky was the defending champion but chose not to defend his title.

Dominik Köpfer won the title after defeating Dennis Novak 3–6, 6–3, 7–6^{(7–5)} in the final.

== Seeds ==
All seeds receive a bye into the second round.

1. (Australia) Jordan Thompson (withdrew)
2. (France) Ugo Humbert (quarterfinals)
3. (Romania) Marius Copil (third round)
4. (Uzbekistan) Denis Istomin (second round)
5. (Germany) Yannick Maden (second round)
6. (Spain) Marcel Granollers (quarterfinals)
7. (Czech Republic) Jiří Veselý (third round)
8. (Brazil) Thiago Monteiro (second round)
9. (Austria) Dennis Novak (final)
10. (Poland) Kamil Majchrzak (semifinals)
11. (France) Grégoire Barrère (third round)
12. (Chinese Taipei) Jason Jung (third round)
13. (France) Antoine Hoang (quarterfinals)
14. (Italy) Salvatore Caruso (second round)
15. (Sweden) Mikael Ymer (third round)
16. (Italy) Gianluca Mager (second round)

== Draw ==
=== Key ===
- Q = Qualifier
- WC = Wild card
- LL = Lucky loser
- Alt = Alternate
- ITF = ITF entry
- PR = Protected ranking
- SR = Special ranking
- SE = Special exempt
- JE = Junior exempt
- JR = Junior Accelerator Programme entrant
- CO = College Accelerator Programme entrant
- NG = Next Gen Accelerator Program entrant
- w/o = Walkover
- r = Retired
- d = Defaulted

=== Finals ===
Quarterfinals
13	(France) Antoine Hoang	3	7	4
10	(Poland) Kamil Majchrzak	6	5	6
(Czech Republic) Lukáš Rosol	7^{11}	3	4
9	(Austria) Dennis Novak	6^{9}	6	6
6	(Spain) Marcel Granollers	5	4
Alt	(Japan) Go Soeda	7	6
(Germany) Dominik Köpfer	6	6
2	(France) Ugo Humbert	4	3

Semifinals
10	(Poland) Kamil Majchrzak	7^{7}	6^{3}	3
9	(Austria) Dennis Novak	6^{1}	7^{7}	6
Alt	(Japan) Go Soeda	4	1
(Germany) Dominik Köpfer	6	6

Final
9	(Austria) Dennis Novak	6	3	6^{5}
(Germany) Dominik Köpfer	3	6	7^{7}

=== Top half ===
==== Section 1 ====
First round
(Japan) T Ito	7^{7}	3	4
(Belgium) R Bemelmans	6^{4}	6	6
(Slovakia) L Lacko	6	6
(Spain) A Menéndez Maceiras	3	4
(Spain) G García López	1	6^{5}
(Japan) Y Sugita	6	7^{7}
(United States) B Fratangelo	7	6
WC	(United Kingdom) R Peniston	5	4

Second round
LL	(Russia) E Karlovskiy	4	1
(Belgium) R Bemelmans	6	6
(Slovakia) L Lacko	3	5
13	(France) A Hoang	6	7
10	(Poland) K Majchrzak	7^{7}	6
(Japan) Y Sugita	6^{1}	3
(United States) B Fratangelo	1	4
7	(Czech Republic) J Veselý	6	6

Third round
(Belgium) R Bemelmans	1	1
13	(France) A Hoang	6	6
10	(Poland) K Majchrzak	6	6
7	(Czech Republic) J Veselý	3	3

Quarterfinals
13	(France) A Hoang	3	7	4
10	(Poland) K Majchrzak	6	5	6

==== Section 2 ====
First round
(Czech Republic) L Rosol	6^{8}	6	7^{7}
(Austria) S Ofner	7^{10}	3	6^{2}
WC	(United Kingdom) J Choinski	6	5	2
Q	(United Kingdom) B Klein	2	7	6
(Australia) J Kubler	6	6
(Germany) O Otte	4	2
(Belarus) E Gerasimov	7^{7}	3	2
WC	(United Kingdom) P Jubb	6^{5}	6	6

Second round
4	(Uzbekistan) D Istomin	3	6	4
(Czech Republic) L Rosol	6	4	6
Q	(United Kingdom) B Klein	3	1
15	(Sweden) M Ymer	6	6
9	(Austria) D Novak	7^{7}	6
(Australia) J Kubler	6^{5}	3
WC	(United Kingdom) P Jubb	4	6	6
8	(Brazil) T Monteiro	6	3	2

Third round
(Czech Republic) L Rosol	6	7^{7}
15	(Sweden) M Ymer	3	6^{4}
9	(Austria) D Novak	6	6
WC	(United Kingdom) P Jubb	3	2

Quarterfinals
(Czech Republic) L Rosol	7^{11}	3	4
9	(Austria) D Novak	6^{9}	6	6

=== Bottom half ===
==== Section 3 ====
First round
(United States) M Giron	6	6
(Italy) F Baldi	1	4
(Australia) J Duckworth	6	6
(Slovakia) F Horanský	1	2
Alt	(Japan) G Soeda	7^{7}	7^{10}
Q	(Croatia) V Galović	6^{4}	6^{8}
(United States) M Krueger	6	7^{7}
(Ecuador) E Gómez	3	6^{2}

Second round
6	(Spain) M Granollers	6	6
(United States) M Giron	4	3
(Australia) J Duckworth	6^{3}	3
11	(France) G Barrère	7^{7}	6
14	(Italy) S Caruso	6	1	4
Alt	(Japan) G Soeda	0	6	6
(United States) M Krueger	6^{5}	6^{4}
3	(Romania) M Copil	7^{7}	7^{7}

Third round
6	(Spain) M Granollers	6	3	7
11	(France) G Barrère	2	6	5
Alt	(Japan) G Soeda	7^{7}	6
3	(Romania) M Copil	6^{5}	3

Quarterfinals
6	(Spain) M Granollers	5	4
Alt	(Japan) G Soeda	7	6

==== Section 4 ====
First round
(Australia) M Polmans	6^{1}	3
(Germany) D Köpfer	7^{7}	6
(Russia) E Donskoy	3	6^{11}
(Australia) A Bolt	6	7^{13}
(South Korea) S-w Kwon	6	6
WC	(United Kingdom) E Hoyt	0	4
WC	(United Kingdom) L Broady	6^{5}	2
(Italy) S Napolitano	7^{7}	6

Second round
5	(Germany) Y Maden	2	4
(Germany) D Köpfer	6	6
(Australia) A Bolt	6^{2}	1
12	(Chinese Taipei) J Jung	7^{7}	6
16	(Italy) G Mager	6	2	0
(South Korea) S-w Kwon	4	6	6
(Italy) S Napolitano	6	4	0
2	(France) U Humbert	4	6	6

Third round
(Germany) D Köpfer	7^{8}	6
12	(Chinese Taipei) J Jung	6^{6}	4
(South Korea) S-w Kwon	2	5
2	(France) U Humbert	6	7

Quarterfinals
(Germany) D Köpfer	6	6
2	(France) U Humbert	4	3
