= 2018 Birmingham Classic =

- Date: 18–24 June
- Edition: 37th
- Category: WTA Premier
- Draw: 32S / 16D
- Prize money: $846,000
- Surface: Grass
- Location: Birmingham, United Kingdom
- Venue: Edgbaston Priory Club

Champions

Singles
- (Czech Republic) Petra Kvitová

Doubles
- (Hungary) Tímea Babos / (France) Kristina Mladenovic
| ← 2017 · | Birmingham Classic | · 2019 → |

The 2018 Birmingham Classic (also known as the Nature Valley Classic for sponsorship reasons) was a women's tennis tournament played on outdoor grass courts. It was the 37th edition of the event, and a Premier tournament on the 2018 WTA Tour. It was contested at the Edgbaston Priory Club in Birmingham, United Kingdom, 18 - 24 June 2018. Petra Kvitová successfully defended its 2017 singles title.

== Points and prize money ==
=== Point distribution ===
| Event | W | F | SF | QF | Round of 16 | Round of 32^{1} | Q | Q3 | Q2 | Q1 |
| Singles | 470 | 305 | 185 | 100 | 55 | 1 | 25 | 18 | 13 | 1 |
| Doubles | 470 | 305 | 185 | 100 | 1 | — | — | — | — | — |

=== Prize money ===
| Event | W | F | SF | QF | Round of 16 | Round of 32 | Q3 | Q2 | Q1 |
| Singles | $163,085 | $86,840 | $46,345 | $24,880 | $13,311 | $6,398 | $3,791 | $2,021 | $1,122 |
| Doubles * | $50,876 | $27,155 | $14,845 | $7,562 | $4,098 | — | — | — | — |

_{^{1}Qualifiers prize money is also the round of 32 prize money.}
_{*per team}

== Singles main draw entrants ==
=== Seeds ===
| Country | Player | Rank^{1} | Seed |
|---|---|---|---|
| ESP | Garbiñe Muguruza | 3 | 1 |
| UKR | Elina Svitolina | 5 | 2 |
| CZE | Karolína Plíšková | 7 | 3 |
| CZE | Petra Kvitová | 8 | 4 |
| GER | Julia Görges | 13 | 5 |
| RUS | Daria Kasatkina | 14 | 6 |
| BEL | Elise Mertens | 15 | 7 |
| USA | CoCo Vandeweghe | 16 | 8 |

- ^{1} Rankings as of June 11, 2018.

=== Other entrants ===
The following players received wildcards into the main draw:

- (United Kingdom) Katie Boulter
- (Ukraine) Elina Svitolina
- (United Kingdom) Heather Watson

The following players received entry from the qualifying draw:

- (France) Océane Dodin
- (United States) Jennifer Brady
- (Slovenia) Dalila Jakupović
- (Czech Republic) Kristýna Plíšková

=== Withdrawals ===
Before the tournament

- (United States) Madison Keys → replaced by (Croatia) Donna Vekić

== Doubles main draw entrants ==
=== Seeds ===
| Country | Player | Country | Player | Rank^{1} | Seed |
|---|---|---|---|---|---|
| HUN | Tímea Babos | FRA | Kristina Mladenovic | 12 | 1 |
| CZE | Andrea Sestini Hlaváčková | CZE | Barbora Strýcová | 12 | 2 |
| TPE | Latisha Chan | CAN | Gabriela Dabrowski | 15 | 3 |
| CZE | Barbora Krejčíková | CZE | Kateřina Siniaková | 17 | 4 |

- ^{1} Rankings as of June 11, 2018.

=== Other entrants ===
The following pair received a wildcard into the doubles main draw:

- (Canada) Eugenie Bouchard / (Slovakia) Dominika Cibulková
- (United Kingdom) Katie Boulter / (United Kingdom) Heather Watson

== Finals ==
=== Singles ===
- (Czech Republic) Petra Kvitová defeated (Slovakia) Magdaléna Rybáriková, 4–6, 6–1, 6–2

=== Doubles ===
- (Hungary) Tímea Babos / (France) Kristina Mladenovic defeated (Belgium) Elise Mertens / (Netherlands) Demi Schuurs, 4–6, 6–3, [10–8]
