= 2020 ITF Women's World Tennis Tour (July–September) =

The 2020 ITF Women's World Tennis Tour is the 2020 edition of the second tier tour for women's professional tennis. It is organised by the International Tennis Federation and is a tier below the WTA Tour. The ITF Women's World Tennis Tour includes tournaments with prize money ranging from $15,000 up to $100,000.

The tour restarted on 17 August having been suspended since 13 March due to the COVID-19 pandemic.

== Key ==
Category
W100 tournaments
W80 tournaments
W60 tournaments
W25 tournaments
W15 tournaments

== Month ==
=== July ===
No tournaments held due to the coronavirus pandemic

=== August ===
| Week of | Tournament | Winner | Runners-up | Semifinalists | Quarterfinalists |
|---|---|---|---|---|---|
| August 3 | Tournaments cancelled due to the coronavirus pandemic | | | | |
| August 10 | Tournaments cancelled due to the coronavirus pandemic | | | | |
| August 17 | Oeiras, Portugal; Clay; W15; Singles and Doubles Draws | (Denmark) Clara Tauson; 6–3, 6–2 | (Spain) María Gutiérrez Carrasco | (United Kingdom) Amanda Carreras (France) Alice Ramé | (Spain) Cristina Bucșa (China) Zheng Qinwen (Spain) Eva Guerrero Álvarez (Russia) Anastasiya Komardina |
| August 17 | Oeiras, Portugal; Clay; W15; Singles and Doubles Draws | (Spain) Eva Guerrero Álvarez (France) Diane Parry; 7–6^{(7–1)}, 6–0 | (Portugal) Francisca Jorge (Spain) Olga Parres Azcoitia | (United Kingdom) Amanda Carreras (France) Alice Ramé | (Spain) Cristina Bucșa (China) Zheng Qinwen (Spain) Eva Guerrero Álvarez (Russia) Anastasiya Komardina |
| August 24 | Internazionali di Tennis del Friuli Venezia Giulia; Cordenons, Italy; Clay; W15; Singles and Doubles Draws | (China) Zheng Qinwen; 6–1, 6–0 | (Austria) Mira Antonitsch | (Italy) Federica Di Sarra (Germany) Alexandra Vecic | (Italy) Martina Caregaro (Italy) Melania Delai (Germany) Anja Wildgruber (Slovenia) Tina Cvetkovič |
| August 24 | Internazionali di Tennis del Friuli Venezia Giulia; Cordenons, Italy; Clay; W15; Singles and Doubles Draws | (Italy) Martina Colmegna (Italy) Federica Di Sarra; 6–2, 7–6^{(9–7)} | (Italy) Angelica Moratelli (Slovenia) Nika Radišić | (Italy) Federica Di Sarra (Germany) Alexandra Vecic | (Italy) Martina Caregaro (Italy) Melania Delai (Germany) Anja Wildgruber (Slovenia) Tina Cvetkovič |
| August 24 | Alkmaar, Netherlands; Clay; W15; Singles and Doubles Draws | (Netherlands) Cindy Burger; 6–1, 6–4 | (Germany) Noma Noha Akugue | (France) Marine Partaud (Germany) Nastasja Schunk | (Germany) Sina Herrmann (Norway) Malene Helgø (France) Sara Cakarevic (Germany) Lena Ruppert |
| August 24 | Alkmaar, Netherlands; Clay; W15; Singles and Doubles Draws | (Netherlands) Suzan Lamens (France) Marine Partaud; 7–5, 7–6^{(7–3)} | (Netherlands) Eva Vedder (Netherlands) Stéphanie Visscher | (France) Marine Partaud (Germany) Nastasja Schunk | (Germany) Sina Herrmann (Norway) Malene Helgø (France) Sara Cakarevic (Germany) Lena Ruppert |
| August 31 | Montemor-o-Novo, Portugal; Hard; W25; Singles and Doubles Draws | (Brazil) Beatriz Haddad Maia; 6–1, 6–4 | (United Kingdom) Jodie Burrage | (Romania) Ioana Loredana Roșca (Switzerland) Ylena In-Albon | (Russia) Daria Mishina (United Kingdom) Maia Lumsden (Spain) Marina Bassols Ribera (Italy) Angelica Moratelli |
| August 31 | Montemor-o-Novo, Portugal; Hard; W25; Singles and Doubles Draws | (Spain) Marina Bassols Ribera (Romania) Ioana Loredana Roșca; 7–6^{(7–5)}, 4–6, [10–6] | (United Kingdom) Jodie Burrage (United Kingdom) Olivia Nicholls | (Romania) Ioana Loredana Roșca (Switzerland) Ylena In-Albon | (Russia) Daria Mishina (United Kingdom) Maia Lumsden (Spain) Marina Bassols Ribera (Italy) Angelica Moratelli |
| August 31 | Marbella, Spain; Clay; W25; Singles and Doubles Draws | (China) Zheng Qinwen; 4–6, 6–4, 6–4 | (Russia) Alina Charaeva | (Czech Republic) Aneta Laboutková (Spain) Yvonne Cavallé Reimers | (Spain) Leyre Romero Gormaz (Russia) Oksana Selekhmeteva (France) Alice Ramé (Romania) Miriam Bulgaru |
| August 31 | Marbella, Spain; Clay; W25; Singles and Doubles Draws | (Russia) Alina Charaeva (Russia) Oksana Selekhmeteva; 6–3, 6–2 | (Romania) Miriam Bulgaru (France) Victoria Muntean | (Czech Republic) Aneta Laboutková (Spain) Yvonne Cavallé Reimers | (Spain) Leyre Romero Gormaz (Russia) Oksana Selekhmeteva (France) Alice Ramé (Romania) Miriam Bulgaru |
| August 31 | Trieste, Italy; Clay; W15; Singles and Doubles Draws | (Italy) Federica Di Sarra; 6–0, 6–1 | (Italy) Camilla Rosatello | (Italy) Lucia Bronzetti (Italy) Dalila Spiteri | (Czech Republic) Michaela Bayerlová (Germany) Alexandra Vecic (Latvia) Daniela Vismane (Italy) Nuria Brancaccio |
| August 31 | Trieste, Italy; Clay; W15; Singles and Doubles Draws | (Colombia) Yuliana Lizarazo (Italy) Aurora Zantedeschi; 6–2, 6–3 | (Italy) Melania Delai (Italy) Lisa Pigato | (Italy) Lucia Bronzetti (Italy) Dalila Spiteri | (Czech Republic) Michaela Bayerlová (Germany) Alexandra Vecic (Latvia) Daniela Vismane (Italy) Nuria Brancaccio |
| August 31 | Otočec, Slovenia; Clay; W15; Singles and Doubles Draws | (Slovenia) Živa Falkner; 6–0, 7–6^{(8–6)} | (Slovenia) Tina Cvetkovič | (Italy) Nicole Fossa Huergo (Germany) Nastasja Schunk | (Slovenia) Manca Pislak (Slovakia) Romana Čisovská (Germany) Sina Herrmann (Hungary) Vanda Lukács |
| August 31 | Otočec, Slovenia; Clay; W15; Singles and Doubles Draws | (Slovenia) Tina Cvetkovič (Slovenia) Pia Lovrič; 6–3, 6–1 | (Hungary) Dorka Drahota-Szabó (Hungary) Adrienn Nagy | (Italy) Nicole Fossa Huergo (Germany) Nastasja Schunk | (Slovenia) Manca Pislak (Slovakia) Romana Čisovská (Germany) Sina Herrmann (Hungary) Vanda Lukács |

=== September ===
| Week of | Tournament | Winner | Runners-up | Semifinalists | Quarterfinalists |
|---|---|---|---|---|---|
| September 7 | L'Open 35 de Saint-Malo; Saint-Malo, France; Clay; W60+H; Singles Draw – Doubles Draw | (Argentina) Nadia Podoroska; 4–6, 7–5, 6–2 | (Spain) Cristina Bucșa | (Colombia) Camila Osorio (Poland) Magdalena Fręch | (France) Océane Dodin (France) Clara Burel (United States) Varvara Lepchenko (Spain) Eva Guerrero Álvarez |
| September 7 | L'Open 35 de Saint-Malo; Saint-Malo, France; Clay; W60+H; Singles Draw – Doubles Draw | (Poland) Paula Kania (Poland) Katarzyna Piter; 6–2, 6–4 | (Poland) Magdalena Fręch (Switzerland) Viktorija Golubic | (Colombia) Camila Osorio (Poland) Magdalena Fręch | (France) Océane Dodin (France) Clara Burel (United States) Varvara Lepchenko (Spain) Eva Guerrero Álvarez |
| September 7 | Prague, Czech Republic; Clay; W25; Singles and Doubles Draws | (Slovakia) Jana Čepelová; 6–4, 7–6^{(7–4)} | (Mexico) Renata Zarazúa | (Japan) Yuki Naito (Romania) Oana Georgeta Simion | (Czech Republic) Barbora Krejčíková (Czech Republic) Johana Marková (Czech Republic) Jesika Malečková (Netherlands) Suzan Lamens |
| September 7 | Prague, Czech Republic; Clay; W25; Singles and Doubles Draws | (Czech Republic) Anastasia Dețiuc (Czech Republic) Johana Marková; 6–2, 6–1 | (United States) Sofia Sewing (United States) Katie Volynets | (Japan) Yuki Naito (Romania) Oana Georgeta Simion | (Czech Republic) Barbora Krejčíková (Czech Republic) Johana Marková (Czech Republic) Jesika Malečková (Netherlands) Suzan Lamens |
| September 7 | Tarvisio, Italy; Clay; W25; Singles and Doubles Draws | (Italy) Federica Di Sarra; 3–6, 6–3, 6–4 | (Belgium) Maryna Zanevska | (United Kingdom) Francesca Jones (Liechtenstein) Kathinka von Deichmann | (Croatia) Lea Bošković (Belgium) Marie Benoît (Austria) Julia Grabher (France) Tessah Andrianjafitrimo |
| September 7 | Tarvisio, Italy; Clay; W25; Singles and Doubles Draws | (Belgium) Marie Benoît (Romania) Alexandra Cadanțu; 6–1, 6–3 | (Hungary) Anna Bondár (Argentina) Paula Ormaechea | (United Kingdom) Francesca Jones (Liechtenstein) Kathinka von Deichmann | (Croatia) Lea Bošković (Belgium) Marie Benoît (Austria) Julia Grabher (France) Tessah Andrianjafitrimo |
| September 7 | Figueira da Foz, Portugal; Hard; W25+H; Singles and Doubles Draws | (Spain) Georgina García Pérez; 6–7^{(10–12)}, 7–5, 6–4 | (Brazil) Beatriz Haddad Maia | (Denmark) Clara Tauson (Spain) Andrea Lázaro García | (United Kingdom) Maia Lumsden (Spain) Marina Bassols Ribera (Egypt) Sandra Samir (Italy) Lucrezia Stefanini |
| September 7 | Figueira da Foz, Portugal; Hard; W25+H; Singles and Doubles Draws | (Brazil) Ingrid Gamarra Martins (Brazil) Beatriz Haddad Maia; 7–5, 6–1 | (Sweden) Jacqueline Cabaj Awad (Portugal) Inês Murta | (Denmark) Clara Tauson (Spain) Andrea Lázaro García | (United Kingdom) Maia Lumsden (Spain) Marina Bassols Ribera (Egypt) Sandra Samir (Italy) Lucrezia Stefanini |
| September 7 | Varna, Bulgaria; Clay; W15; Singles and Doubles Draws | (Norway) Malene Helgø; 6–7^{(1–7)}, 6–3, 6–3 | (Switzerland) Sebastianna Scilipoti | (Bulgaria) Gergana Topalova (Bulgaria) Petia Arshinkova | (Romania) Ioana Loredana Roșca (Germany) Chantal Sauvant (Romania) Elena-Teodora Cadar (Turkey) Özlem Uslu |
| September 7 | Varna, Bulgaria; Clay; W15; Singles and Doubles Draws | (Romania) Cristina Dinu (Romania) Ioana Loredana Roșca; 6–4, 3–6, [10–7] | (Romania) Oana Gavrilă (Romania) Andreea Roșca | (Bulgaria) Gergana Topalova (Bulgaria) Petia Arshinkova | (Romania) Ioana Loredana Roșca (Germany) Chantal Sauvant (Romania) Elena-Teodora Cadar (Turkey) Özlem Uslu |
| September 7 | Saint-Palais-sur-Mer, France; Clay; W15; Singles and Doubles Draws | (Sweden) Caijsa Hennemann; 3–6, 6–3, 7–6^{(8–6)} | (Hungary) Dorka Drahota-Szabó | (Netherlands) Lexie Stevens (Hungary) Adrienn Nagy | (France) Océane Babel (Switzerland) Nina Stadler (Austria) Tamira Paszek (Belgium) Vicky Van de Peer |
| September 7 | Saint-Palais-sur-Mer, France; Clay; W15; Singles and Doubles Draws | (France) Yasmine Mansouri (France) Lucie Wargnier; 6–0, 6–3 | (France) Anaëlle Leclercq (France) Lucie Nguyen Tan | (Netherlands) Lexie Stevens (Hungary) Adrienn Nagy | (France) Océane Babel (Switzerland) Nina Stadler (Austria) Tamira Paszek (Belgium) Vicky Van de Peer |
September 14
| September 14 | Open de Cagnes-sur-Mer; Cagnes-sur-Mer, France; Clay; W80; Singles Draw – Doubles Draw | (Spain) Sara Sorribes Tormo; 6–3, 6–4 | (Romania) Irina Bara | (Bulgaria) Viktoriya Tomova (Russia) Varvara Gracheva | (Switzerland) Viktorija Golubic (Australia) Daria Gavrilova (France) Océane Dodin (Australia) Lizette Cabrera |
| September 14 | Open de Cagnes-sur-Mer; Cagnes-sur-Mer, France; Clay; W80; Singles Draw – Doubles Draw | (United Kingdom) Samantha Murray Sharan (Germany) Julia Wachaczyk; 7–5, 6–2 | (Poland) Paula Kania (Poland) Katarzyna Piter | (Bulgaria) Viktoriya Tomova (Russia) Varvara Gracheva | (Switzerland) Viktorija Golubic (Australia) Daria Gavrilova (France) Océane Dodin (Australia) Lizette Cabrera |
| September 14 | Zagreb Ladies Open; Zagreb, Croatia; Clay; W25; Singles and Doubles Draws | (Croatia) Ana Konjuh; 6–4, 6–2 | (Croatia) Tereza Mrdeža | (Romania) Andreea Roșca (Russia) Kamilla Rakhimova | (Serbia) Dejana Radanović (United Kingdom) Francesca Jones (Sweden) Mirjam Björklund (France) Amandine Hesse |
| September 14 | Zagreb Ladies Open; Zagreb, Croatia; Clay; W25; Singles and Doubles Draws | (Croatia) Silvia Njirić (Serbia) Dejana Radanović; 4–6, 7–5, [10–8] | (Greece) Valentini Grammatikopoulou (Mexico) Ana Sofía Sánchez | (Romania) Andreea Roșca (Russia) Kamilla Rakhimova | (Serbia) Dejana Radanović (United Kingdom) Francesca Jones (Sweden) Mirjam Björklund (France) Amandine Hesse |
| September 14 | Frýdek-Místek, Czech Republic; Clay; W25; Singles and Doubles Draws | (China) Zheng Qinwen; 3–6, 6–4, 6–0 | (Romania) Gabriela Talabă | (Czech Republic) Miriam Kolodziejová (Cyprus) Raluca Șerban | (Czech Republic) Barbora Krejčíková (Slovenia) Nina Potočnik (Netherlands) Cindy Burger (Czech Republic) Johana Marková |
| September 14 | Frýdek-Místek, Czech Republic; Clay; W25; Singles and Doubles Draws | (Czech Republic) Anastasia Dețiuc (Czech Republic) Johana Marková; 6–1, 6–4 | (Czech Republic) Miriam Kolodziejová (Czech Republic) Jesika Malečková | (Czech Republic) Miriam Kolodziejová (Cyprus) Raluca Șerban | (Czech Republic) Barbora Krejčíková (Slovenia) Nina Potočnik (Netherlands) Cindy Burger (Czech Republic) Johana Marková |
| September 14 | Grado, Italy; Clay; W25; Singles and Doubles Draws | (Germany) Sina Herrmann; 6–4, 7–5 | (Belgium) Lara Salden | (Italy) Lisa Pigato (Romania) Alexandra Cadanțu | (Hungary) Anna Bondár (Slovenia) Dalila Jakupović (Italy) Stefania Rubini (Austria) Julia Grabher |
| September 14 | Grado, Italy; Clay; W25; Singles and Doubles Draws | (Hungary) Anna Bondár (Hungary) Fanny Stollár; 7–5, 6–2 | (Italy) Federica Di Sarra (Italy) Camilla Rosatello | (Italy) Lisa Pigato (Romania) Alexandra Cadanțu | (Hungary) Anna Bondár (Slovenia) Dalila Jakupović (Italy) Stefania Rubini (Austria) Julia Grabher |
| September 14 | Santarém, Portugal; Hard; W15; Singles and Doubles Draws | (Brazil) Beatriz Haddad Maia; 6–0, 6–0 | (Poland) Martyna Kubka | (Chile) Bárbara Gatica (France) Océane Babel | (Brazil) Ingrid Gamarra Martins (Belgium) Magali Kempen (Slovakia) Viktória Morvayová (Lithuania) Justina Mikulskytė |
| September 14 | Santarém, Portugal; Hard; W15; Singles and Doubles Draws | (Portugal) Francisca Jorge (Spain) Olga Parres Azcoitia; 6–2, 6–3 | (Poland) Martyna Kubka (Ukraine) Valeriya Strakhova | (Chile) Bárbara Gatica (France) Océane Babel | (Brazil) Ingrid Gamarra Martins (Belgium) Magali Kempen (Slovakia) Viktória Morvayová (Lithuania) Justina Mikulskytė |
| September 14 | Melilla, Spain; Clay; W15; Singles and Doubles Draws | (United Kingdom) Matilda Mutavdzic; 6–2, 7–5 | (Spain) Yvonne Cavallé Reimers | (Brazil) Laura Pigossi (Andorra) Victoria Jiménez Kasintseva | (Spain) Leyre Romero Gormaz (Estonia) Maria Lota Kaul (Spain) Lucía Cortez Llorca (Russia) Alina Charaeva |
| September 14 | Melilla, Spain; Clay; W15; Singles and Doubles Draws | (Spain) Yvonne Cavallé Reimers (Spain) Ángela Fita Boluda; 7–6^{(7–1)}, 6–4 | (Sweden) Caijsa Hennemann (Czech Republic) Anna Sisková | (Brazil) Laura Pigossi (Andorra) Victoria Jiménez Kasintseva | (Spain) Leyre Romero Gormaz (Estonia) Maria Lota Kaul (Spain) Lucía Cortez Llorca (Russia) Alina Charaeva |
| September 14 | Monastir, Tunisia; Hard; W15; Singles and Doubles Draws | (Belarus) Shalimar Talbi; 2–6, 7–5, 6–4 | (Belarus) Anna Kubareva | (Netherlands) Lian Tran (Belarus) Yuliya Hatouka | (Czech Republic) Tereza Dejnožková (Tunisia) Chiraz Bechri (United States) Zoe Howard (Switzerland) Lulu Sun |
| September 14 | Monastir, Tunisia; Hard; W15; Singles and Doubles Draws | (Belarus) Yuliya Hatouka (Belarus) Anna Kubareva; 2–6, 7–5, [10–6] | (Denmark) Olivia Gram (Latvia) Darja Semenistaja | (Netherlands) Lian Tran (Belarus) Yuliya Hatouka | (Czech Republic) Tereza Dejnožková (Tunisia) Chiraz Bechri (United States) Zoe Howard (Switzerland) Lulu Sun |
| September 21 | Přerov, Czech Republic; Clay; W25; Singles and Doubles Draws | (United States) Grace Min; 6–3, 0–6, 7–5 | (Spain) Georgina García Pérez | (Greece) Valentini Grammatikopoulou (Czech Republic) Miriam Kolodziejová | (Czech Republic) Jesika Malečková (Netherlands) Suzan Lamens (Czech Republic) Aneta Laboutková (Germany) Jule Niemeier |
| September 21 | Přerov, Czech Republic; Clay; W25; Singles and Doubles Draws | (Slovakia) Chantal Škamlová (Czech Republic) Tereza Smitková; 7–6^{(7–5)}, 7–6^{(7–4)} | (Romania) Nicoleta Dascălu (Cyprus) Raluca Șerban | (Greece) Valentini Grammatikopoulou (Czech Republic) Miriam Kolodziejová | (Czech Republic) Jesika Malečková (Netherlands) Suzan Lamens (Czech Republic) Aneta Laboutková (Germany) Jule Niemeier |
| September 21 | Porto, Portugal; Hard; W15; Singles and Doubles Draws | (Brazil) Beatriz Haddad Maia; 6–3, 6–2 | (Brazil) Ingrid Gamarra Martins | (Spain) Marina Bassols Ribera (Finland) Anastasia Kulikova | (United Kingdom) Katy Dunne (Japan) Yuriko Lily Miyazaki (Ukraine) Valeriya Strakhova (France) Océane Babel |
| September 21 | Porto, Portugal; Hard; W15; Singles and Doubles Draws | (Brazil) Carolina Alves (Spain) Marina Bassols Ribera; 6–3, 4–6, [10–7] | (Spain) Júlia Payola (Japan) Himeno Sakatsume | (Spain) Marina Bassols Ribera (Finland) Anastasia Kulikova | (United Kingdom) Katy Dunne (Japan) Yuriko Lily Miyazaki (Ukraine) Valeriya Strakhova (France) Océane Babel |
| September 21 | Monastir, Tunisia; Hard; W15; Singles and Doubles Draws | (Belarus) Yuliya Hatouka; 6–3, 6–2 | (Belarus) Shalimar Talbi | (Belarus) Anna Kubareva (Russia) Darya Astakhova | (Switzerland) Lulu Sun (France) Alice Robbe (Italy) Chiara Catini (Russia) Anastasia Sukhotina |
| September 21 | Monastir, Tunisia; Hard; W15; Singles and Doubles Draws | (Czech Republic) Laetitia Pulchartová (Latvia) Darja Semenistaja; 6–2, 6–7^{(8–10)}, [10–5] | (Russia) Darya Astakhova (Russia) Anastasia Sukhotina | (Belarus) Anna Kubareva (Russia) Darya Astakhova | (Switzerland) Lulu Sun (France) Alice Robbe (Italy) Chiara Catini (Russia) Anastasia Sukhotina |
| September 28 | Porto, Portugal; Hard; W25; Singles and Doubles Draws | (Spain) Georgina García Pérez; 1–6, 6–4, 6–3 | (Portugal) Francisca Jorge | (Brazil) Beatriz Haddad Maia (Spain) Cristina Bucșa | (United Kingdom) Katy Dunne (Germany) Jule Niemeier (Spain) Andrea Lázaro García (Switzerland) Susan Bandecchi |
| September 28 | Porto, Portugal; Hard; W25; Singles and Doubles Draws | (United States) Jamie Loeb (Mexico) Ana Sofía Sánchez; 2–6, 6–3, [10–8] | (Croatia) Jana Fett (New Zealand) Erin Routliffe | (Brazil) Beatriz Haddad Maia (Spain) Cristina Bucșa | (United Kingdom) Katy Dunne (Germany) Jule Niemeier (Spain) Andrea Lázaro García (Switzerland) Susan Bandecchi |
| September 28 | Monastir, Tunisia; Hard; W15; Singles and Doubles Draws | (Belarus) Shalimar Talbi; 6–2, 6–3 | (Russia) Darya Astakhova | (Switzerland) Lulu Sun (Argentina) María Lourdes Carlé | (Latvia) Darja Semenistaja (Italy) Chiara Catini (France) Alice Robbe (Russia) Ekaterina Vishnevskaya |
| September 28 | Monastir, Tunisia; Hard; W15; Singles and Doubles Draws | (Russia) Darya Astakhova (Latvia) Darja Semenistaja; 6–4, 6–3 | (Argentina) María Lourdes Carlé (Denmark) Olivia Gram | (Switzerland) Lulu Sun (Argentina) María Lourdes Carlé | (Latvia) Darja Semenistaja (Italy) Chiara Catini (France) Alice Robbe (Russia) Ekaterina Vishnevskaya |
