= 2021 L'Open 35 de Saint-Malo =

- Date: 3–9 May 2021
- Edition: 26th
- Category: WTA 125
- Prize money: $115,000
- Surface: Clay
- Location: Saint-Malo, France

Champions

Singles
- (Switzerland) Viktorija Golubic

Doubles
- (United States) Kaitlyn Christian / (United States) Sabrina Santamaria
← 2020 ·	L'Open 35 de Saint-Malo	· 2022 →

The 2021 L'Open 35 de Saint-Malo was a professional tennis tournament played on outdoor clay courts. It was the twenty-sixth edition of the tournament and its first as part of the 2021 edition of the WTA 125K series. It took place in Saint-Malo, France between 3 and 9 May 2021.

== Singles main-draw entrants ==
=== Seeds ===
Country	Player	Rank^{1}	Seed
FRA	Alizé Cornet	60	1
SWE	Rebecca Peterson	61	2
BEL	Alison Van Uytvanck	68	3
SLO	Tamara Zidanšek	80	4
SUI	Viktorija Golubic	84	5
NED	Arantxa Rus	85	6
SRB	Nina Stojanović	88	7
USA	Christina McHale	90	8

- ^{1} Rankings are as of 26 April 2021.

=== Other entrants ===
The following players received wildcards into the singles main draw:

- (France) Clara Burel
- (France) Elsa Jacquemot
- (France) Diane Parry
- (France) Harmony Tan

The following players received entry from the qualifying draw:

- (France) Tessah Andrianjafitrimo
- (Brazil) Luisa Stefani
- (Denmark) Clara Tauson
- (Bulgaria) Viktoriya Tomova

The following player received entry as a lucky loser:

- (France) Amandine Hesse

=== Withdrawals ===
Before the tournament

- (Spain) Paula Badosa → replaced by (Belgium) Greet Minnen
- (Romania) Irina-Camelia Begu → replaced by (Spain) Aliona Bolsova
- (Russia) Anna Blinkova → replaced by (Russia) Varvara Gracheva
- (United States) Lauren Davis → replaced by (Italy) Martina Trevisan
- (Kazakhstan) Zarina Diyas → replaced by (Russia) Anna Kalinskaya
- (Japan) Misaki Doi → replaced by (Slovakia) Anna Karolína Schmiedlová
- (France) Caroline Garcia → replaced by (Belarus) Aliaksandra Sasnovich
- (Italy) Camila Giorgi → replaced by (Ukraine) Kateryna Kozlova
- (Slovenia) Polona Hercog → replaced by (France) Océane Dodin
- (Japan) Nao Hibino → replaced by (France) Amandine Hesse
- (Estonia) Kaia Kanepi → replaced by (Czech Republic) Tereza Martincová
- (Montenegro) Danka Kovinić → replaced by (Italy) Jasmine Paolini
- (Germany) Laura Siegemund → replaced by (China) Wang Xiyu

== Doubles main-draw entrants ==
=== Seeds ===
Country	Player	Country	Player	Rank^{1}	Seed
USA	Hayley Carter	BRA	Luisa Stefani	53	1
USA	Kaitlyn Christian	USA	Sabrina Santamaria	129	2
RUS	Anna Kalinskaya	RUS	Yana Sizikova	174	3
BLR	Lidziya Marozava	ROU	Andreea Mitu	196	4

- ^{1} Rankings as of April 26, 2021.

== Champions ==
=== Singles ===
- (Switzerland) Viktorija Golubic def. (Italy) Jasmine Paolini, 6–1, 6–3

=== Doubles ===
- (United States) Kaitlyn Christian / (United States) Sabrina Santamaria def. (United States) Hayley Carter / (Brazil) Luisa Stefani, 7–6^{(7–4)}, 4–6, [10–5]
