= 2019 L'Open 35 de Saint-Malo =

- Date: 16–22 September 2019
- Edition: 24th
- Category: ITF Women's World Tennis Tour
- Prize money: $60,000+H
- Surface: Clay
- Location: Saint-Malo, France

Champions

Singles
- (Russia) Varvara Gracheva

Doubles
- (Georgia (country)) Ekaterine Gorgodze / (Belgium) Maryna Zanevska
← 2018 ·	L'Open 35 de Saint-Malo	· 2020 →

The 2019 L'Open 35 de Saint-Malo was a professional tennis tournament played on outdoor clay courts. It was the twenty-fourth edition of the tournament which was part of the 2019 ITF Women's World Tennis Tour. It took place in Saint-Malo, France between 16 and 22 September 2019.

== Singles main-draw entrants ==
=== Seeds ===
Country	Player	Rank^{1}	Seed
FRA	Pauline Parmentier	82	1
ESP	Aliona Bolsova	91	2
RUS	Natalia Vikhlyantseva	97	3
GER	Tamara Korpatsch	111	4
PAR	Verónica Cepede Royg	148	5
LUX	Mandy Minella	149	6
ITA	Giulia Gatto-Monticone	158	7
USA	Allie Kiick	161	8

- ^{1} Rankings are as of 9 September 2019.

=== Other entrants ===
The following players received wildcards into the singles main draw:

- (France) Tessah Andrianjafitrimo
- (France) Lou Brouleau
- (France) Alice Ramé
- (Belgium) Maryna Zanevska

The following players received entry from the qualifying draw:

- (France) Audrey Albié
- (Spain) Eva Guerrero Álvarez
- (Spain) Guiomar Maristany
- (Luxembourg) Eléonora Molinaro
- (Chile) Daniela Seguel
- (Germany) Stephanie Wagner
- (France) Lucie Wargnier
- (France) Margot Yerolymos

== Champions ==
=== Singles ===
- (Russia) Varvara Gracheva def. (Ukraine) Marta Kostyuk, 6–3, 6–2

=== Doubles ===
- (Georgia (country)) Ekaterine Gorgodze / (Belgium) Maryna Zanevska def. (Spain) Aliona Bolsova / (Croatia) Tereza Mrdeža, 6–7^{(8–10)}, 7–5, [10–8]
