= 2021 L'Open 35 de Saint-Malo – Singles =

Singles
- 2021 L'Open 35 de Saint-Malo

Final
- Champion: (Switzerland) Viktorija Golubic
- Runner-up: (Italy) Jasmine Paolini
- Score: 6–1, 6–3

Events
Singles	Doubles
← 2020 ·	L'Open 35 de Saint-Malo	· 2022 →

Nadia Podoroska was the defending champion but chose not to participate.

Viktorija Golubic won the title, defeating Jasmine Paolini in the final, 6–1, 6–3.

== Seeds ==
1. (France) Alizé Cornet (first round)
2. (Sweden) Rebecca Peterson (quarterfinals)
3. (Belgium) Alison Van Uytvanck (first round)
4. (Slovenia) Tamara Zidanšek (second round)
5. (Switzerland) Viktorija Golubic (champion)
6. (Netherlands) Arantxa Rus (second round)
7. (Serbia) Nina Stojanović (second round)
8. (United States) Christina McHale (first round)

== Draw ==
=== Key ===
- Q = Qualifier
- WC = Wild card
- LL = Lucky loser
- Alt = Alternate
- SE = Special exempt
- PR = Protected ranking
- ITF = ITF entry
- JE = Junior exempt
- w/o = Walkover
- r = Retired
- d = Defaulted
- SR = Special ranking

=== Finals ===
Semifinals
WC	(France) Harmony Tan	6^{4}	3
5	(Switzerland) Viktorija Golubic	7^{7}	6
(Italy) Jasmine Paolini	6	6
(Russia) Varvara Gracheva	3	1

Final
5	(Switzerland) Viktorija Golubic	6	6
(Italy) Jasmine Paolini	1	3

=== Top half ===
First round
1	(France) A Cornet	5	7^{10}	1
(France) O Dodin	7	6^{8}	6
(Spain) A Bolsova	6	6
(Italy) M Trevisan	2	4
WC	(France) H Tan	6	4	6
(China) Y Wang	4	6	3
(Russia) M Gasparyan	7^{7}	1	4
6	(Netherlands) A Rus	6^{4}	6	6
4	(Slovenia) T Zidanšek	6^{1}	6	6
(Czech Republic) T Martincová	7^{7}	2	1
(Belarus) A Sasnovich	7	0	7
Q	(France) T Andrianjafitrimo	5	6	5
Q	(Brazil) L Stefani	4	6	4
(Belgium) G Minnen	6	3	6
WC	(France) C Burel	2	6^{4}
5	(Switzerland) V Golubic	6	7^{7}

Second round
(France) O Dodin	7	5	5
(Spain) A Bolsova	5	7	7
WC	(France) H Tan	6	6
6	(Netherlands) A Rus	4	2
4	(Slovenia) T Zidanšek	6^{3}	3
(Belarus) A Sasnovich	7^{7}	6
(Belgium) G Minnen	4	6	6^{2}
5	(Switzerland) V Golubic	6	4	7^{7}

Quarterfinals
(Spain) A Bolsova	6^{3}	0
WC	(France) H Tan	7^{7}	6
(Belarus) A Sasnovich	1	0
5	(Switzerland) V Golubic	6	6

Semifinals
WC	(France) H Tan	6^{4}	3
5	(Switzerland) V Golubic	7^{7}	6

=== Bottom half ===
First round
7	(Serbia) N Stojanović	6	1	6
(Switzerland) S Vögele	3	6	4
WC	(France) E Jacquemot	5	7	2
(Italy) J Paolini	7	5	6
(Ukraine) K Kozlova	6	6
WC	(France) D Parry	2	3
(Slovakia) AK Schmiedlová	2	7	6
3	(Belgium) A Van Uytvanck	6	5	3
8	(United States) C McHale	4	6	2
Q	(Bulgaria) V Tomova	6	2	6
Q	(Denmark) C Tauson	6	3	3
(Russia) V Gracheva	3	6	6
LL	(France) A Hesse	0	6	2
(Russia) A Kalinskaya	6	4	6
(China) Xiy Wang	6	4	5
2	(Sweden) R Peterson	4	6	7

Second round
7	(Serbia) N Stojanović	6	2	1
(Italy) J Paolini	4	6	6
(Ukraine) K Kozlova	3	7	4
(Slovakia) AK Schmiedlová	6	5	6
Q	(Bulgaria) V Tomova	4	5^{r}
(Russia) V Gracheva	6	5
(Russia) A Kalinskaya	6	4	0^{r}
2	(Sweden) R Peterson	4	6	4

Quarterfinals
(Italy) J Paolini	6	7
(Slovakia) AK Schmiedlová	3	5
(Russia) V Gracheva	6	6
2	(Sweden) R Peterson	4	0

Semifinals
(Italy) J Paolini	6	6
(Russia) V Gracheva	3	1

== Qualifying ==
=== Seeds ===
1. (Denmark) Clara Tauson (qualified)
2. (Bulgaria) Viktoriya Tomova (qualified)
3. (China) Wang Xiyu (moved to main draw)
4. (Ukraine) Kateryna Kozlova (moved to main draw)
5. (Switzerland) Leonie Küng (first round)
6. (Japan) Kurumi Nara (first round)
7. (France) Tessah Andrianjafitrimo (qualified)
8. (France) Amandine Hesse (qualifying competition, lucky loser)

=== Qualifiers ===
1. (Denmark) Clara Tauson
2. (Bulgaria) Viktoriya Tomova
3. (Brazil) Luisa Stefani
4. (France) Tessah Andrianjafitrimo

=== Lucky loser ===
1. (France) Amandine Hesse

=== Draw ===
==== First qualifier ====
First round				Qualifying competition
				1	(Denmark) Clara Tauson	6	6
				8	(France) Amandine Hesse	2	4
	(Germany) Julia Wachaczyk	4	1	8	(France) Amandine Hesse	2	4
8	(France) Amandine Hesse	6	6

==== Second qualifier ====
First round					Qualifying competition
					2	(Bulgaria) Viktoriya Tomova	4	7	6
						(Germany) Vivian Heisen	6	5	1
	(Germany) Vivian Heisen	3	6	6		(Germany) Vivian Heisen	6	5	1
5	(Switzerland) Leonie Küng	6	4	2

==== Third qualifier ====
First round					Qualifying competition
					Bye
					(Brazil) Luisa Stefani
	(Brazil) Luisa Stefani	6	1	6	(Brazil) Luisa Stefani
6	(Japan) Kurumi Nara	1	6	4

==== Fourth qualifier ====
First round					Qualifying competition
						(United Kingdom) Emily Webley-Smith	6	2	4
					7	(France) Tessah Andrianjafitrimo	2	6	6
	(Russia) Yana Sizikova	6	0	5	7	(France) Tessah Andrianjafitrimo	2	6	6
7	(France) Tessah Andrianjafitrimo	4	6	7
