= 2019 L'Open 35 de Saint-Malo – Singles =

Singles
- 2019 L'Open 35 de Saint-Malo

Final
- Champion: (Russia) Varvara Gracheva
- Runner-up: (Ukraine) Marta Kostyuk
- Score: 6–3, 6–2

Events
Singles	Doubles
← 2018 ·	L'Open 35 de Saint-Malo	· 2020 →

Liudmila Samsonova was the defending champion, but chose to participate in Osaka instead.

Varvara Gracheva won the title, defeating Marta Kostyuk in the final, 6–3, 6–2.

== Seeds ==
1. (France) Pauline Parmentier (first round)
2. (Spain) Aliona Bolsova (second round)
3. (Russia) Natalia Vikhlyantseva (semifinals, retired)
4. (Germany) Tamara Korpatsch (first round)
5. (Paraguay) Verónica Cepede Royg (semifinals)
6. (Luxembourg) Mandy Minella (first round)
7. (Italy) Giulia Gatto-Monticone (second round)
8. (United States) Allie Kiick (first round)

== Draw ==
=== Key ===
- Q = Qualifier
- WC = Wild card
- LL = Lucky loser
- Alt = Alternate
- SE = Special exempt
- PR = Protected ranking
- ITF = ITF entry
- JE = Junior exempt
- w/o = Walkover
- r = Retired
- d = Defaulted
- SR = Special ranking

=== Finals ===
Semifinals
(Ukraine) Marta Kostyuk	6	6
5	(Paraguay) Verónica Cepede Royg	4	2
3	(Russia) Natalia Vikhlyantseva	3	2^{r}
(Russia) Varvara Gracheva	6	5

Final
(Ukraine) Marta Kostyuk	3	2
(Russia) Varvara Gracheva	6	6

=== Top half ===
First round
1	(France) P Parmentier	5	4
WC	(France) T Andrianjafitrimo	7	6
WC	(Belgium) M Zanevska	7	6
WC	(France) A Ramé	5	4
(Ukraine) M Kostyuk	6	6
Q	(Spain) G Maristany	3	1
Q	(France) M Yerolymos	6	6
8	(United States) A Kiick	3	3
4	(Germany) T Korpatsch	5	3
(Romania) I Bara	7	6
Q	(Luxembourg) E Molinaro	2	1
(Slovakia) R Šramková	6	6
(Georgia (country)) E Gorgodze	7	4	0
(Spain) C Bucșa	5	6	6
WC	(France) L Brouleau	4	2
5	(Paraguay) V Cepede Royg	6	6

Second round
WC	(France) T Andrianjafitrimo	5	7^{7}	2
WC	(Belgium) M Zanevska	7	6^{3}	6
(Ukraine) M Kostyuk	6	6
Q	(France) M Yerolymos	1	4
(Romania) I Bara	6^{5}	6	6
(Slovakia) R Šramková	7^{7}	1	4
(Spain) C Bucșa	4	5
5	(Paraguay) V Cepede Royg	6	7

Quarterfinals
WC	(Belgium) M Zanevska	6^{5}	1
(Ukraine) M Kostyuk	7^{7}	6
(Romania) I Bara	3	1
5	(Paraguay) V Cepede Royg	6	6

Semifinals
(Ukraine) M Kostyuk	6	6
5	(Paraguay) V Cepede Royg	4	2

=== Bottom half ===
First round
7	(Italy) G Gatto-Monticone	3	7	7
(Latvia) D Marcinkēviča	6	5	5
Q	(France) A Albié	1	2
(France) J Ponchet	6	6
(France) A Hesse	6	4	3
(Hungary) D Gálfi	4	6	6
(Italy) M Di Giuseppe	4	6^{6}
3	(Russia) N Vikhlyantseva	6	7^{8}
6	(Luxembourg) M Minella	6^{1}	6	5
Q	(Spain) E Guerrero Álvarez	7^{7}	3	7
(Croatia) T Mrdeža	6	6
Q	(Germany) S Wagner	2	4
Q	(France) L Wargnier	3	0
(Russia) V Gracheva	6	6
Q	(Chile) D Seguel	3	2
2	(Spain) A Bolsova	6	6

Second round
7	(Italy) G Gatto-Monticone	5	6	5
(France) J Ponchet	7	2	7
(Hungary) D Gálfi	0	0
3	(Russia) N Vikhlyantseva	6	6
Q	(Spain) E Guerrero Álvarez	7^{7}	2	7
(Croatia) T Mrdeža	6^{5}	6	5
(Russia) V Gracheva	6	6
2	(Spain) A Bolsova	3	1

Quarterfinals
(France) J Ponchet	4	4
3	(Russia) N Vikhlyantseva	6	6
Q	(Spain) E Guerrero Álvarez	3	2
(Russia) V Gracheva	6	6

Semifinals
3	(Russia) N Vikhlyantseva	3	2^{r}
(Russia) V Gracheva	6	5
