= Zheng Qinwen career statistics =

Chinese tennis player's statistics

Career finals
Discipline	Type	Won	Lost	Total
Singles	Grand Slam	0	1	1
Singles	WTA Finals	0	1	1
Singles	WTA Elite	0	1	1
Singles	WTA 1000	1	1	2
Singles	WTA 500	2	1	3
Singles	WTA 250	2	0	2
Singles	Olympics	1	0	1
Singles	Total	6	5	11
Doubles	Grand Slam	–	–	–
Doubles	WTA Finals	–	–	–
Doubles	WTA Elite	–	–	–
Doubles	WTA 1000	–	–	–
Doubles	WTA 500	–	–	–
Doubles	WTA 250	–	–	–
Doubles	Olympics	–	–	–
Doubles	Total	–	–	–

The list covers the main career statistics of Chinese professional tennis player Zheng Qinwen.

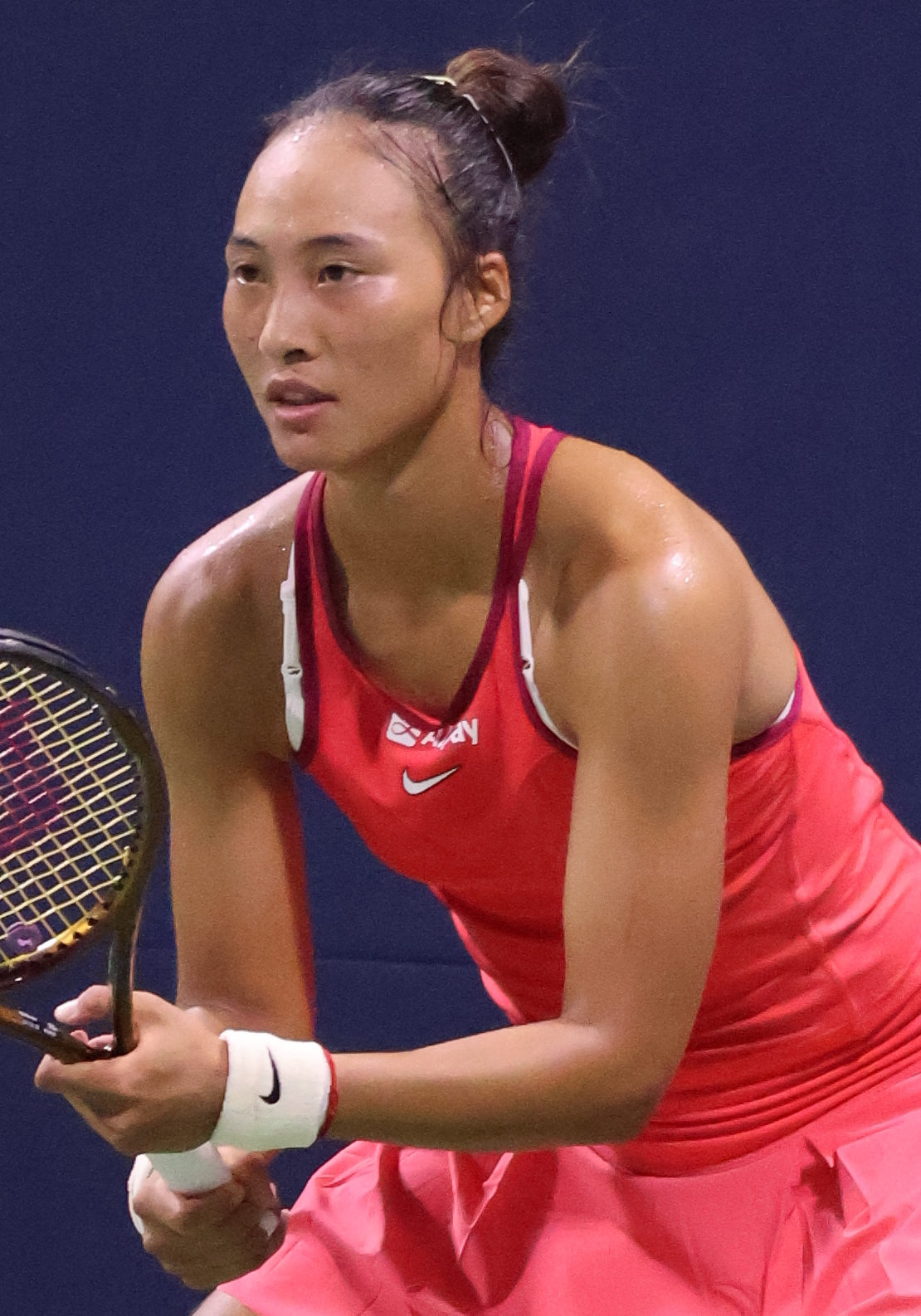
Zheng at the 2023 US Open.

== Performance timelines ==
Key
W	F	SF	QF	#R	RR	Q#	DNQ	A	NH

(W) winner; (F) finalist; (SF) semifinalist; (QF) quarterfinalist; (#R) rounds 4, 3, 2, 1; (RR) round-robin stage; (Q#) qualification round; (DNQ) did not qualify; (A) absent; (NH) not held; (SR) strike rate (events won / competed); (W–L) win–loss record.
To avoid confusion and double counting, these charts are updated at the conclusion of a tournament or when the player's participation has ended.

Only main-draw results in WTA Tour, Grand Slam tournaments, Billie Jean King Cup, United Cup, Hopman Cup and Olympic Games are included in win–loss records.

=== Singles ===
Current through the 2026 China Open.

Tournament	2021	2022	2023	2024	2025	2026	SR	W–L	Win %
Grand Slam tournaments
Australian Open	A	2R	2R	F	2R	A	0 / 4	9–4	69%
French Open	A	4R	2R	3R	QF	1R	0 / 5	10–5	67%
Wimbledon	A	3R	1R	1R	1R	1R	0 / 5	2–5	29%
US Open	A	3R	QF	QF	A	QF	0 / 4	14–4	78%
Win–loss	0–0	8–4	6–4	12–4	5–3	4–3	0 / 18	35–18	65%
Year-end championships
WTA Finals	DNQ			F	DNQ		0 / 1	3–2	60%
WTA Elite Trophy	Not Held		F	Not Held			0 / 1	3–1	75%
National representation
Summer Olympics	A	Not Held		G	Not Held		1 / 1	6–0	100%
Billie Jean King Cup	A (Note: Edition is split into two years due to COVID-19.)	PO	A	PO	A	QF	0 / 0	3–2	60%
WTA 1000 tournaments
Qatar Open	NTI	A	NTI	3R	2R	3R	0 / 3	3–3	50%
Dubai Championships	A	NTI	2R (Note: Withdrew during the tournament, not counted as a loss.)	QF	2R	A	0 / 3	3–2	60%
Indian Wells Open	A	2R	A	2R	QF	2R	0 / 4	4–4	50%
Miami Open	A	1R	4R	3R	QF	4R	0 / 5	8–5	62%
Madrid Open	A	1R	3R	2R	2R	3R	0 / 5	2–5	29%
Italian Open	A	A	QF	QF	SF	3R	0 / 4	12–4	75%
Canadian Open	A	QF	2R	A	A	Q1	0 / 3	4–3	57%
Cincinnati Open	A	A	3R	3R	A	A	0 / 2	3–2	60%
China Open	Not Held		1R	SF	3R	W	1 / 4	12–3	80%
Wuhan Open	Not Held			F	A	A	0 / 1	4–1	80%
Win–loss	0–0	4–4	10–6	16–9	11–7	14–5	1 / 33	55–31	64%
Career statistics
	2021	2022	2023	2024	2025	2026	SR	W–L	Win %
Tournaments	3	17	22	20	12	14	Career total: 88		
Titles	0	0	2	3	0	1	Career total: 6		
Finals	0	1	3	6	0	1	Career total: 11		
Hard win–loss	0–2	16–11	24–12	32–12	8–6	17–6	3 / 51	97–49	66%
Clay win–loss	1–1	4–3	11–4	17–4	10–4	3–3	3 / 23	46–19	71%
Grass win–loss	0–0	2–3	0–3	1–2	2–2	2–4	0 / 14	7–14	33%
Overall win–loss	1–3	22–17	35–19	50–18	20–12	22–13	6 / 88	150–82	65%
Win %	25%	56%	65%	74%	63%	63%	Career total: 65%		
Year-end ranking (Note: 2018: WTA ranking - 933.)	143	25	15	5	24		$10,207,462		

== Grand Slam tournament finals ==
=== Singles: 1 (runner-up) ===
Result	Year	Tournament	Surface	Opponent	Score
Loss	2024	Australian Open	Hard	Aryna Sabalenka	3–6, 2–6

== Other significant finals ==
=== Year-end championships ===
==== Singles: 1 (runner-up) ====
Result	Year	Tournament	Surface	Opponent	Score
Loss	2024	WTA Finals, Saudi Arabia	Hard (i)	(United States) Coco Gauff	6–3, 4–6, 6–7^{(2–7)}

=== WTA 1000 tournaments ===
==== Singles: 2 (1 title, 1 runner-up) ====
Result	Year	Tournament	Surface	Opponent	Score
Loss	2024	Wuhan Open	Hard	Aryna Sabalenka	3–6, 7–5, 3–6
Win	2026	China Open	Hard	Mirra Andreeva	7–5, 6–4

=== Summer Olympics ===
==== Singles: 1 (gold medal) ====
Result	Year	Tournament	Surface	Opponent	Score
Gold	2024	Paris Olympics	Clay	(Croatia) Donna Vekić	6–2, 6–3

=== WTA Elite Trophy ===
==== Singles: 1 (runner-up) ====
Result	Year	Tournament	Surface	Opponent	Score
Loss	2023	Elite Trophy, China	Hard	(Brazil) Beatriz Haddad Maia	6–7^{(11–13)}, 6–7^{(4–7)}

== WTA Tour finals ==
=== Singles: 11 (6 titles, 5 runner-ups) ===
Legend Grand Slam (0–1) Olympics (1–0) WTA Finals (0–1) WTA Elite Trophy (0–1) WTA 1000 (1–1) WTA 500 (2–1) WTA 250 (2–0)	Finals by surface Hard (3–5) Clay (3–0)	Finals by setting Outdoor (6–4) Indoor (0–1)

Result	W–L	Date	Tournament	Tier	Surface	Opponent	Score
Loss	0–1	Sep 2022	Pan Pacific Open, Japan	WTA 500	Hard	Liudmila Samsonova	5–7, 5–7
Win	1–1	Jul 2023	Palermo Ladies Open, Italy	WTA 250	Clay	(Italy) Jasmine Paolini	6–4, 1–6, 6–1
Win	2–1	Oct 2023	Zhengzhou Open, China	WTA 500	Hard	(Czech Republic) Barbora Krejčíková	2–6, 6–2, 6–4
Loss	2–2	Oct 2023	WTA Elite Trophy, China	Elite	Hard	(Brazil) Beatriz Haddad Maia	6–7^{(11–13)}, 6–7^{(4–7)}
Loss	2–3	Jan 2024	Australian Open, Australia	Grand Slam	Hard	Aryna Sabalenka	3–6, 2–6
Win	3–3	Jul 2024	Palermo Ladies Open, Italy (2)	WTA 250	Clay	(Czech Republic) Karolína Muchová	6–4, 4–6, 6–2
Win	4–3	Aug 2024	Paris Olympics, France	Olympics	Clay	(Croatia) Donna Vekić	6–2, 6–3
Loss	4–4	Oct 2024	Wuhan Open, China	WTA 1000	Hard	Aryna Sabalenka	3–6, 7–5, 3–6
Win	5–4	Oct 2024	Pan Pacific Open, Japan	WTA 500	Hard	(United States) Sofia Kenin	7–6^{(7–5)}, 6–3
Loss	5–5	Nov 2024	WTA Finals, Saudi Arabia	Finals	Hard (i)	(United States) Coco Gauff	6–3, 4–6, 6–7^{(2–7)}
Win	6–5	Oct 2026	China Open, China	WTA 1000	Hard	Mirra Andreeva	7–5, 6–4

== WTA 125 finals ==
=== Singles: 1 (title) ===
Result	W–L	Date	Tournament	Surface	Opponent	Score
Win	1–0	Jun 2022	Internacional de Valencia, Spain	Clay	(China) Wang Xiyu	6–4, 4–6, 6–3

== ITF Circuit finals ==
=== Singles: 8 (8 titles) ===
Legend W60 tournaments (2–0) W25 tournaments (5–0) W15 tournaments (1–0)	Finals by surface Hard (4–0) Clay (4–0)

Result	W–L	Date	Tournament	Tier	Surface	Opponent	Score
Win	1–0	Aug 2020	Internazianali di Cordenons, Italy	W15	Clay	(Austria) Mira Antonitsch	6–1, 6–0
Win	2–0	Aug 2020	ITF Marbella, Spain	W25	Clay	(Russia) Alina Charaeva	4–6, 6–4, 6–4
Win	3–0	Sep 2020	ITF Frýdek-Místek, Czech Republic	W25	Clay	(Romania) Gabriela Talabă	3–6, 6–4, 6–0
Win	4–0	Dec 2020	ITF Selva Gardena, Italy	W25	Hard (i)	(Croatia) Lea Bošković	6–7^{(0–7)}, 6–0, 6–3
Win	5–0	Jan 2021	ITF Hamburg, Germany	W25	Hard (i)	(Czech Republic) Linda Fruhvirtová	6–2, 6–3
Win	6–0	Jun 2021	Macha Lake Open, Czech Republic	W60	Clay	(Serbia) Aleksandra Krunić	7–6^{(7–5)}, 6–3
Win	7–0	Nov 2021	ITF Funchal, Portugal	W25	Hard	(Italy) Martina Trevisan	6–3, 7–5
Win	8–0	Jan 2022	Orlando Pro, United States	W60	Hard	(United States) Christina McHale	6–0, 6–1

=== Junior Circuit finals ===
==== Singles: 8 (5 titles, 3 runner-ups) ====
Legend
Grade A (0–2)
Grade 1 (3–1)
Grade 2 (1–0)
Grade 4 (1–0)

Result	W–L	Date	Tournament	Tier	Surface	Opponent	Score
Win	1–0	Oct 2016	ITF Melaka, Malaysia	Grade 4	Hard	(Chinese Taipei) Lee Yang	6–4, 6–4
Loss	1–1	Jun 2017	ITF Offenbach, Germany	Grade 1	Clay	(United States) Victoria Flores	6–3, 2–6, 1–6
Win	2–1	Nov 2017	ITF Chuncheon, South Korea	Grade 2	Hard	(Chinese Taipei) Joanna Garland	6–2, 6–2
Win	3–1	Mar 2018	ITF Nonthaburi, Thailand	Grade 1	Hard	(Japan) Yuki Naito	6–3, 3–6, 7–5
Win	4–1	May 2018	ITF Santa Croce, Italy	Grade 1	Clay	(Poland) Stefania Rogozinska Dzik	5–7, 6–1, 6–2
Loss	4–2	Oct 2018	Osaka Mayor's Cup, Japan	Grade A	Hard	(Denmark) Clara Tauson	1–6, 0–6
Win	5–2	Dec 2018	ITF Bradenton, United States	Grade 1	Clay	(United States) Elizabeth Mandlik	6–7^{(5–7)}, 6–2, 6–2
Loss	5–3	Dec 2018	ITF Plantation, United States	Grade A	Clay	(United States) Coco Gauff	1–6, 6–3, 4–6

== Career Grand Slam statistics ==
=== Grand Slam tournament seedings ===
The tournaments won by Zheng are in boldface, and advanced into finals by Zheng are in italics.

Legend seeded No. 4–10 (0 / 6) seeded No. 11–32 (0 / 5) unseeded (0 / 5) qualifier (0 / 2)	Longest streak 6 5 3 1

Year	Australian Open	French Open	Wimbledon	US Open
2022	qualifier	unseeded	unseeded	unseeded
2023	29th	19th	24th	23rd
2024	12th (1)	8th	8th	7th
2025	5th	8th	5th	did not play
2026	did not play	unseeded	unseeded	qualifier

=== Best Grand Slam results details ===
Grand Slam winners are in boldface, and runner–ups in italics.

**Australian Open**
**2024 (12th)**
Round	Opponent	Rank	Score
1R	(United States) Ashlyn Krueger	76	3–6, 6–2, 6–3
2R	(United Kingdom) Katie Boulter	54	6–3, 6–3
3R	(China) Wang Yafan	94	6–4, 2–6, 7–6^{(10–8)}
4R	(France) Océane Dodin	95	6–0, 6–3
QF	Anna Kalinskaya	75	6–7^{(4–7)}, 6–3, 6–1
SF	(Ukraine) Dayana Yastremska (Q)	93	6–4, 6–4
F	**Aryna Sabalenka (2)**	2	3–6, 2–6

**Wimbledon**
**2022 (Unseeded)**
Round	Opponent	Rank	Score
1R	(United States) Sloane Stephens	47	7–6^{(7–1)}, 7–5
2R	(Belgium) Greet Minnen	88	6–4, 6–1
3R	**(Kazakhstan) Elena Rybakina (17)**	23	6–7^{(4–7)}, 5–7

**French Open**
**2025 (8th)**
Round	Opponent	Rank	Score
1R	Anastasia Pavlyuchenkova	50	6–4, 6–3
2R	(Colombia) Emiliana Arango	85	6–2, 6–3
3R	(Canada) Victoria Mboko (Q)	120	6–3, 6–4
4R	Liudmila Samsonova (19)	18	7–6^{(7–5)}, 1–6, 6–3
QF	Aryna Sabalenka (1)	**1**	6–7^{(3–7)}, 3–6

**US Open**
**2023 (23rd)**
Round	Opponent	Rank	Score
1R	(Argentina) Nadia Podoroska	70	6–1, 6–0
2R	(Estonia) Kaia Kanepi	133	6–2, 3–6, 6–2
3R	(Italy) Lucia Bronzetti	76	6–3, 4–6, 6–4
4R	(Tunisia) Ons Jabeur (5)	5	6–2, 6–4
QF	Aryna Sabalenka (2)	2	1–6, 4–6
**2024 (7th)**
Round	Opponent	Rank	Score
1R	(United States) Amanda Anisimova (WC)	49	4–6, 6–4, 6–2
2R	Erika Andreeva	89	6–7^{(3–7)}, 6–1, 6–2
3R	(Germany) Jule Niemeier	101	6–2, 6–1
4R	(Croatia) Donna Vekić (24)	24	7–6^{(7–2)}, 4–6, 6–2
QF	**Aryna Sabalenka (2)**	2	1–6, 2–6
**2026 (Qualifier)**
Round	Opponent	Rank	Score
Q1	(China) You Xiaodi	206	6–3, 6–2
Q2	(France) Clara Burel	416	6–1, 7–5
Q3	Elena Pridankina	186	6–4, 3–6, 6–0
1R	Kristina Liutova	125	4–6, 6–3, 6–1
2R	(Kazakhstan) Yulia Putintseva	84	6–4, 2–6, 6–1
3R	(United States) Madison Keys (22)	24	1–6, 7–6^{(7–3)}, 7–5
4R	(Poland) Iga Świątek (8)	8	7–5, 6–3
QF	**(Kazakhstan) Elena Rybakina (2)**	2	6–3, 1–6, 4–6

== Wins against top 10 players ==
- She has a 14–25 record against players who were, at the time the match was played, ranked in the top 10.

No.	Player	Rk	Event	Surface	Rd	Score	Rk	Years	Ref
1.	(Tunisia) Ons Jabeur	5	Canadian Open, Canada	Hard	2R	6–1, 2–1 ret.	51	2022	
2.	(Spain) Paula Badosa	4	Pan Pacific Open, Japan	Hard	2R	6–3, 6–2	36	2022	
3.	Daria Kasatkina	8	Abu Dhabi Open, United Arab Emirates	Hard	QF	6–1, 6–2	29	2023	
4.	(Tunisia) Ons Jabeur	5	US Open, United States	Hard	4R	6–2, 6–4	23	2023	
5.	(Greece) Maria Sakkari	6	Zhengzhou Open, China	Hard	2R	7–6^{(7–2)}, 6–3	24	2023	
6.	(Czech Republic) Markéta Vondroušová	7	United Cup, Australia	Hard	RR	6–1, 2–6, 6–1	15	2024	
7.	(Poland) Iga Świątek	1	Paris Olympics, France	Clay	SF	6–2, 7–5	7	2024	
8.	(Italy) Jasmine Paolini	6	Wuhan Open, China	Hard	QF	6–2, 3–6, 6–3	7	2024	
9.	(Kazakhstan) Elena Rybakina	5	WTA Finals, Saudi Arabia	Hard (i)	RR	7–6^{(7–4)}, 3–6, 6–1	7	2024	
10.	(Italy) Jasmine Paolini	4	WTA Finals, Saudi Arabia	Hard (i)	RR	6–1, 6–1	7	2024	
11.	Aryna Sabalenka	1	Italian Open, Italy	Clay	QF	6–4, 6–3	8	2025	
12.	(Poland) Iga Świątek	8	US Open, United States	Hard	4R	7–5, 6–3	121	2026	
13.	(Ukraine) Elina Svitolina	7	China Open, China	Hard	QF	6–3, 7–6^{(8–6)}	54	2026	
14.	Mirra Andreeva	5	China Open, China	Hard	F	7–5, 6–4	54	2026	

- Key: (Rk) first use, opponent rank; (Rd) round; (Rk) 2nd use, player rank; (Ref) reference; (F) final; (SF) semifinal; (QF) quarterfinal; (#R) rounds 4, 3, 2, 1; (RR) round-robin stage; (Q#) qualifying rounds or stages (3), 2, 1.

== Double bagel matches ==
(matches played by Zheng Qinwen that had the score of 6–0, 6–0)

Result	Year	W–L	Tournament	Tier	Surface	Opponent	vsRank	Round	Rank
Win	2018	1–0	ITF Nanjing, China	15,000	Hard	(China) Zhang Ziyu	n/a	Q1	n/a
Win	2021	2–0	Open Saint-Gaudens, France	60,000	Clay	(Russia) Ekaterina Makarova	544	Q1	254
Win	2023	3–0	Adelaide International 2, Australia	WTA 500	Hard	(Australia) Mia Repac	842	Q1	28
Win	2023	4–0	Palermo Ladies Open, Italy	WTA 250	Clay	(Italy) Sara Errani	112	1R	26
Win	2024	5–0	Billie Jean King Cup, China	Team	Clay	(India) Ankita Raina	255	Z1 RR	7
Win	2024	6–0	Summer Olympics, France	Olympics	Clay	(Italy) Sara Errani	91	1R	7

== Longest winning streaks ==
=== 12-match winning streak (2024) ===
#	Tournament	Tier	Start date	Surface	Rd	Opponent	Rk	Score
–	Wimbledon	Grand Slam	July 1, 2024	Grass	1R	(New Zealand) Lulu Sun (Q)	123	6–4, 2–6, 4–6
1	Palermo Ladies Open	WTA 250	July 15, 2024	Clay	1R	(Italy) Sara Errani	96	6–3, 6–2
2	Palermo Ladies Open	WTA 250	July 15, 2024	Clay	2R	(Croatia) Petra Martić	97	6–4, 6–4
3	Palermo Ladies Open	WTA 250	July 15, 2024	Clay	QF	(Romania) Jaqueline Cristian (7)	66	6–1, 6–1
4	Palermo Ladies Open	WTA 250	July 15, 2024	Clay	SF	(France) Diane Parry (4)	58	7–5, 6–4
5	Palermo Ladies Open	WTA 250	July 15, 2024	Clay	W	(Czech Republic) Karolína Muchová (2)	35	6–4, 4–6, 6–2
6	Paris Olympics	Olympics	July 27, 2024	Clay	1R	(Italy) Sara Errani	95	6–0, 6–0
7	Paris Olympics	Olympics	July 27, 2024	Clay	2R	(Netherlands) Arantxa Rus	62	6–2, 6–4
8	Paris Olympics	Olympics	July 27, 2024	Clay	3R	(United States) Emma Navarro (11)	15	6–7^{(7–9)}, 7–6^{(7–4)}, 6–1
9	Paris Olympics	Olympics	July 27, 2024	Clay	QF	(Germany) Angelique Kerber (PR)	212	6–7^{(4–7)}, 6–4, 7–6^{(8–6)}
10	Paris Olympics	Olympics	July 27, 2024	Clay	SF	(Poland) Iga Świątek (1)	1	6–2, 7–5
11	Paris Olympics	Olympics	July 27, 2024	Clay	W	(Croatia) Donna Vekić (13)	21	6–2, 6–3
12	Cincinnati Open	WTA 1000	August 13, 2024	Hard	2R	(Poland) Magdalena Fręch (Q)	50	6–1, 7–5
–	Cincinnati Open	WTA 1000	August 13, 2024	Hard	3R	Anastasia Pavlyuchenkova	28	5–7, 1–6
