= 2020 L'Open 35 de Saint-Malo – Singles =

Singles
- 2020 L'Open 35 de Saint-Malo

Final
- Champion: (Argentina) Nadia Podoroska
- Runner-up: (Spain) Cristina Bucșa
- Score: 4–6, 7–5, 6–2

Events
Singles	Doubles
← 2019 ·	L'Open 35 de Saint-Malo	· 2021 →

Varvara Gracheva was the defending champion but chose not to participate.

Nadia Podoroska won the title, defeating Cristina Bucșa in the final, 4–6, 7–5, 6–2.

== Seeds ==
1. (France) Océane Dodin (quarterfinals)
2. (Switzerland) Viktorija Golubic (second round)
3. (Ukraine) Anhelina Kalinina (second round)
4. (Spain) Lara Arruabarrena (first round)
5. (France) Pauline Parmentier (second round)
6. (Poland) Magdalena Fręch (semifinals)
7. (Romania) Irina Bara (first round)
8. (Argentina) Nadia Podoroska (champion)

== Draw ==
=== Key ===
- Q = Qualifier
- WC = Wild card
- LL = Lucky loser
- Alt = Alternate
- SE = Special exempt
- PR = Protected ranking
- ITF = ITF entry
- JE = Junior exempt
- w/o = Walkover
- r = Retired
- d = Defaulted
- SR = Special ranking

=== Finals ===
Semifinals
8	(Argentina) Nadia Podoroska	6	7
(Colombia) Camila Osorio	3	5
(Spain) Cristina Bucșa	7^{7}	3	6
6	(Poland) Magdalena Fręch	6^{5}	6	4

Final
8	(Argentina) Nadia Podoroska	4	7	6
(Spain) Cristina Bucșa	6	5	2

=== Top half ===
First round
1	(France) O Dodin	6	7^{8}
Q	(France) A Droguet	3	6^{6}
WC	(France) M Partaud	7	5	0^{r}
(Serbia) N Kostić	5	7	5
(France) H Tan	3	6	6
(Egypt) M Sherif	6	2	4
Q	(Latvia) D Marcinkēviča	6^{0}	5
8	(Argentina) N Podoroska	7^{7}	7
3	(Ukraine) A Kalinina	6	3	6
(Norway) U Eikeri	3	6	2
WC	(France) C Burel	6	6
Q	(United Kingdom) A Carreras	3	4
(Colombia) C Osorio	4	6	7
Q	(France) S Cakarevic	6	1	5
Q	(France) F Brugnone	2	1
5	(France) P Parmentier	6	6

Second round
1	(France) O Dodin	6	2	6
(Serbia) N Kostić	0	6	0
(France) H Tan	6^{5}	5
8	(Argentina) N Podoroska	7^{7}	7
3	(Ukraine) A Kalinina	0	4
WC	(France) C Burel	6	6
(Colombia) C Osorio	6	4	6
5	(France) P Parmentier	2	6	4

Quarterfinals
1	(France) O Dodin	6^{1}	3
8	(Argentina) N Podoroska	7^{7}	6
WC	(France) C Burel	1	3
(Colombia) C Osorio	6	6

Semifinals
8	(Argentina) N Podoroska	6	7
(Colombia) C Osorio	3	5

=== Bottom half ===
First round
7	(Romania) I Bara	6	6^{6}	4
(United States) V Lepchenko	4	7^{8}	6
(France) C Paquet	5	5
WC	(France) A Hesse	7	7
Q	(France) A Albié	3	2
WC	(France) M Yerolymos	6	6
(Spain) C Bucșa	4	6	7
4	(Spain) L Arruabarrena	6	3	5
6	(Poland) M Fręch	6	6
(Bulgaria) E Kostova	3	3
Q	(France) E Jacquemot	7	7
(Russia) A Komardina	5	5
(Spain) E Guerrero Álvarez	6	6
Q	(Malta) H Pellicano	0	2
(Chile) D Seguel	6^{3}	4
2	(Switzerland) V Golubic	7^{7}	6

Second round
(United States) V Lepchenko	6	6
WC	(France) A Hesse	3	1
WC	(France) M Yerolymos	4	0
(Spain) C Bucșa	6	6
6	(Poland) M Fręch	6	6
Q	(France) E Jacquemot	2	4
(Spain) E Guerrero Álvarez	1	6	7
2	(Switzerland) V Golubic	6	3	5

Quarterfinals
(United States) V Lepchenko	3	4
(Spain) C Bucșa	6	6
6	(Poland) M Fręch	6	7^{12}
(Spain) E Guerrero Álvarez	2	6^{10}

Semifinals
(Spain) C Bucșa	7^{7}	3	6
6	(Poland) M Fręch	6^{5}	6	4
