= 2019 L'Open 35 de Saint-Malo – Doubles =

Doubles
- 2019 L'Open 35 de Saint-Malo

Final
- Champions: (Georgia (country)) Ekaterine Gorgodze (Belgium) Maryna Zanevska
- Runners-up: (Spain) Aliona Bolsova (Croatia) Tereza Mrdeža
- Score: 6–7^{(8–10)}, 7–5, [10–8]

Events
Singles	Doubles
← 2018 ·	L'Open 35 de Saint-Malo	· 2020 →

Cristina Bucșa and María Fernanda Herazo were the defending champions, but Herazo chose not to participate. Bucșa partnered alongside Diāna Marcinkēviča, but lost in the quarterfinals to Lou Brouleau and Ioana Loredana Roșca.

Ekaterine Gorgodze and Maryna Zanevska won the title, defeating Aliona Bolsova and Tereza Mrdeža in the final, 6–7^{(8–10)}, 7–5, [10–8].

== Seeds ==
1. (Romania) Irina Bara / (Luxembourg) Mandy Minella (quarterfinals)
2. (Spain) Cristina Bucșa / (Latvia) Diāna Marcinkēviča (quarterfinals)
3. (Spain) Aliona Bolsova / (Croatia) Tereza Mrdeža (final)
4. (Hungary) Dalma Gálfi / (Russia) Natalia Vikhlyantseva (first round)

== Draw ==
=== Key ===
- Q = Qualifier
- WC = Wild card
- LL = Lucky loser
- Alt = Alternate
- SE = Special exempt
- PR = Protected ranking
- ITF = ITF entry
- JE = Junior exempt
- w/o = Walkover
- r = Retired
- d = Defaulted
- SR = Special ranking

=== Draw ===
First round
(Georgia (country)) E Gorgodze (Belgium) M Zanevska	6	6
(Spain) L Cortez Llorca (Spain) R Vicens Mas	0	2
4	(Hungary) D Gálfi (Russia) N Vikhlyantseva	6^{1}	6	[8]
(Spain) E Guerrero Álvarez (Spain) G Maristany	7^{7}	4	[10]
(Italy) M Di Giuseppe (Italy) G Gatto-Monticone	4	6	[6]
(Greece) E Kordolaimi (Lithuania) J Mikulskytė	6	2	[10]
(France) A Hesse (Chile) D Seguel	4	6	[10]
(Uzbekistan) A Khabibulina (Kyrgyzstan) K Palkina	6	2	[4]
(Germany) T Morderger (Germany) Y Morderger	5	3
3	(Spain) A Bolsova (Croatia) T Mrdeža	7	6
(France) L Brouleau (Romania) IL Roșca	6	6
(France) M Dury (France) M Partaud	2	4

Quarterfinals
1	(Romania) I Bara (Luxembourg) M Minella	3	6	[5]
(Georgia (country)) E Gorgodze (Belgium) M Zanevska	6	2	[10]
(Spain) E Guerrero Álvarez (Spain) G Maristany	6	6
(Greece) E Kordolaimi (Lithuania) J Mikulskytė	1	2
(France) A Hesse (Chile) D Seguel
3	(Spain) A Bolsova (Croatia) T Mrdeža	w/o
(France) L Brouleau (Romania) IL Roșca	6	6
2	(Spain) C Bucșa (Latvia) D Marcinkēviča	2	3

Semifinals
(Georgia (country)) E Gorgodze (Belgium) M Zanevska	6	6
(Spain) E Guerrero Álvarez (Spain) G Maristany	1	1
3	(Spain) A Bolsova (Croatia) T Mrdeža	3	6	[10]
(France) L Brouleau (Romania) IL Roșca	6	4	[3]

Final
(Georgia (country)) E Gorgodze (Belgium) M Zanevska	6^{8}	7	[10]
3	(Spain) A Bolsova (Croatia) T Mrdeža	7^{10}	5	[8]
