= 2021 L'Open 35 de Saint-Malo – Doubles =

Doubles
- 2021 L'Open 35 de Saint-Malo

Final
- Champions: (United States) Kaitlyn Christian (United States) Sabrina Santamaria
- Runners-up: (United States) Hayley Carter (Brazil) Luisa Stefani
- Score: 7–6^{(7–4)}, 4–6, [10–5]

Events
Singles	Doubles
← 2020 ·	L'Open 35 de Saint-Malo	· 2022 →

Paula Kania-Choduń and Katarzyna Piter were the defending champions but chose not to participate.

Kaitlyn Christian and Sabrina Santamaria won the title, defeating Hayley Carter and Luisa Stefani in the final, 7–6^{(7–4)}, 4–6, [10–5].

== Seeds ==
1. (United States) Hayley Carter / (Brazil) Luisa Stefani (final)
2. (United States) Kaitlyn Christian / (United States) Sabrina Santamaria (champions)
3. (Russia) Anna Kalinskaya / (Russia) Yana Sizikova (quarterfinals)
4. (Belarus) Lidziya Marozava / (Romania) Andreea Mitu (first round)

== Draw ==
=== Key ===
- Q = Qualifier
- WC = Wild card
- LL = Lucky loser
- Alt = Alternate
- SE = Special exempt
- PR = Protected ranking
- ITF = ITF entry
- JE = Junior exempt
- w/o = Walkover
- r = Retired
- d = Defaulted
- SR = Special ranking

=== Draw ===
First round
(Germany) V Heisen (Sweden) C Lister	7^{7}	6
(Switzerland) L Küng (Japan) K Nara	6^{4}	2
(Belgium) G Minnen (Belgium) A Van Uytvanck	0	6	[9]
(France) E Lechemia (Germany) J Wachaczyk	6	2	[11]
(Netherlands) A Rus (China) Xiy Wang	6	6
(France) A Hesse (France) H Tan	3	3
(Belarus) A Sasnovich (Denmark) C Tauson	2	6	[10]
4	(Belarus) L Marozava (Romania) A Mitu	6	4	[6]
(Georgia (country)) O Kalashnikova (Russia) A Kudryavtseva	6^{6}	6	[10]
(Spain) A Bolsova (United Kingdom) E Webley-Smith	7^{8}	2	[8]

Quarterfinals
1	(United States) H Carter (Brazil) L Stefani	6	6
(Germany) V Heisen (Sweden) C Lister	2	4
3	(Russia) A Kalinskaya (Russia) Y Sizikova	5	6	[8]
(France) E Lechemia (Germany) J Wachaczyk	7	2	[10]
(Netherlands) A Rus (China) Xiy Wang	3	3
(Belarus) A Sasnovich (Denmark) C Tauson	6	6
(Georgia (country)) O Kalashnikova (Russia) A Kudryavtseva	3	3
2	(United States) K Christian (United States) S Santamaria	6	6

Semifinals
1	(United States) H Carter (Brazil) L Stefani	6	6
(France) E Lechemia (Germany) J Wachaczyk	2	2
(Belarus) A Sasnovich (Denmark) C Tauson	6	4	[8]
2	(United States) K Christian (United States) S Santamaria	1	6	[10]

Final
1	(United States) H Carter (Brazil) L Stefani	6^{4}	6	[5]
2	(United States) K Christian (United States) S Santamaria	7^{7}	4	[10]
