= 2020 L'Open 35 de Saint-Malo =

- Date: 7–13 September 2020
- Edition: 25th
- Category: ITF Women's World Tennis Tour
- Prize money: $60,000+H
- Surface: Clay
- Location: Saint-Malo, France

Champions

Singles
- (Argentina) Nadia Podoroska

Doubles
- (Poland) Paula Kania / (Poland) Katarzyna Piter
← 2019 ·	L'Open 35 de Saint-Malo	· 2021 →

The 2020 L'Open 35 de Saint-Malo was a professional tennis tournament played on outdoor clay courts. It was the twenty-fifth edition of the tournament which was part of the 2020 ITF Women's World Tennis Tour. It took place in Saint-Malo, France between 7 and 13 September 2020.

== Singles main-draw entrants ==
=== Seeds ===
Country	Player	Rank^{1}	Seed
FRA	Océane Dodin	115	1
SUI	Viktorija Golubic	123	2
UKR	Anhelina Kalinina	145	3
ESP	Lara Arruabarrena	150	4
FRA	Pauline Parmentier	157	5
POL	Magdalena Fręch	158	6
ROU	Irina Bara	161	7
ARG	Nadia Podoroska	165	8

- ^{1} Rankings are as of 31 August 2020.

=== Other entrants ===
The following players received wildcards into the singles main draw:

- (France) Clara Burel
- (France) Amandine Hesse
- (France) Marine Partaud
- (France) Margot Yerolymos

The following players received entry from the qualifying draw:

- (France) Audrey Albié
- (France) Flavie Brugnone
- (France) Sara Cakarevic
- (United Kingdom) Amanda Carreras
- (France) Aubane Droguet
- (France) Elsa Jacquemot
- (Latvia) Diāna Marcinkēviča
- (Malta) Helene Pellicano

== Champions ==
=== Singles ===
- (Argentina) Nadia Podoroska def. (Spain) Cristina Bucșa, 4–6, 7–5, 6–2

=== Doubles ===
- (Poland) Paula Kania / (Poland) Katarzyna Piter def. (Poland) Magdalena Fręch / (Switzerland) Viktorija Golubic, 6–2, 6–4
