= Kaitlyn Christian =

American tennis player (born 1992)

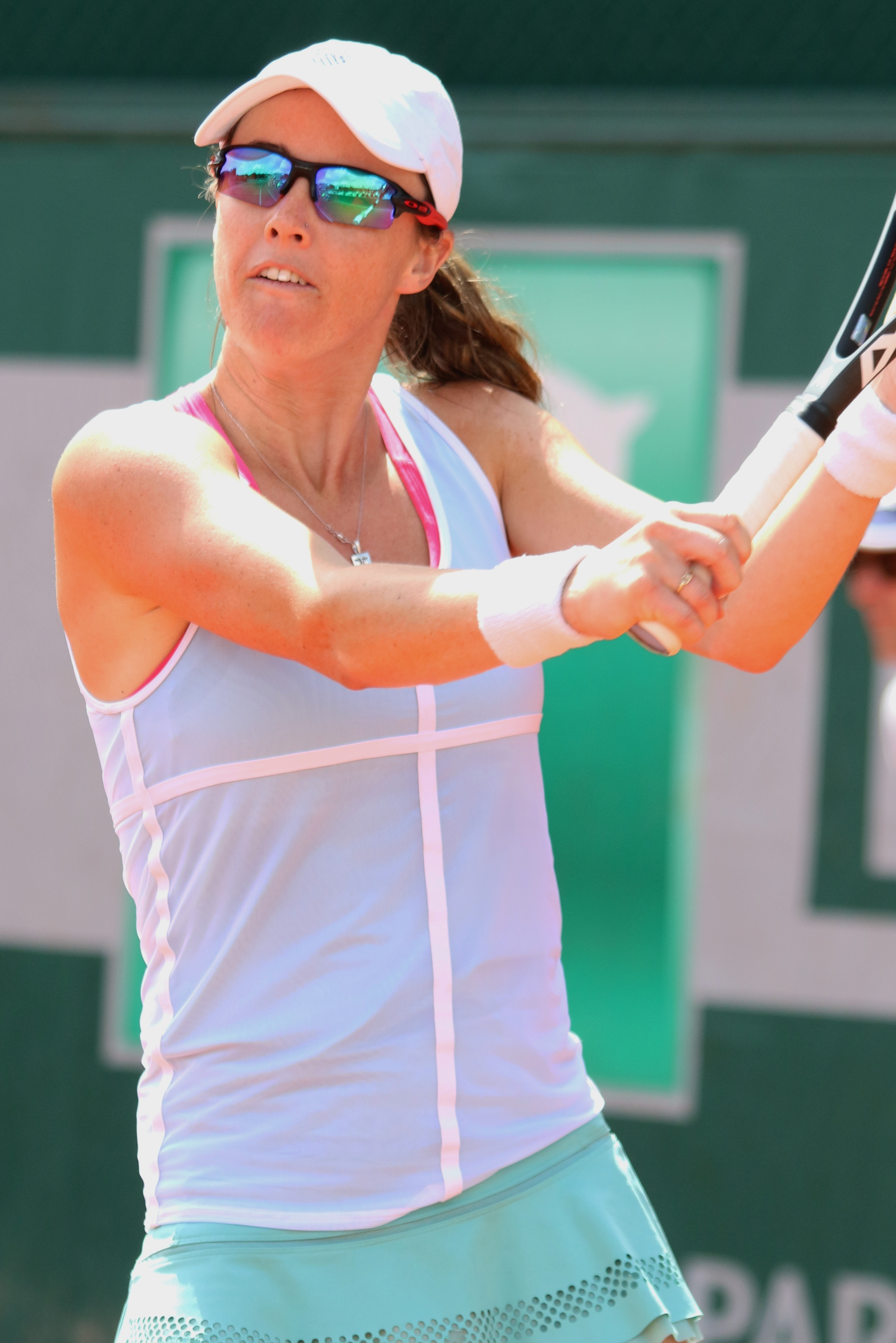
- Christian at the 2018 French Open
- Country (sports): United States
- Born: January 13, 1992 (age 34) Orange, California
- Height: 1.80 m (5 ft 11 in)
- Plays: Right (two-handed backhand)
- Prize money: $588,826

Singles
- Career record: 50–55
- Career titles: 0
- Highest ranking: No. 570 (September 25, 2017)

Doubles
- Career record: 183–197
- Career titles: 1 WTA, 1 WTA Challenger
- Highest ranking: No. 38 (February 25, 2019)

Grand Slam doubles results
- Australian Open: 3R (2019)
- French Open: 2R (2018, 2020, 2022)
- Wimbledon: 2R (2018, 2021)
- US Open: 2R (2022)

Grand Slam mixed doubles results
- Wimbledon: 1R (2022)
- US Open: 1R (2013, 2018)

Kaitlyn Christian (born January 13, 1992) is an American pickleball player and an inactive tennis player who specialized in doubles.

In tennis, she has a career-high doubles ranking of world No. 38, achieved in February 2019, and a best singles ranking of 570, reached in September 2017. Christian has won one doubles title on the WTA Tour and one doubles title on the WTA Challenger Tour, along with 14 titles (13 in doubles) on the ITF Circuit.

== Personal life ==
Christian was Emma Stone's body double as Billie Jean King in the 2017 film Battle of the Sexes, and she also is credited as portraying tennis player Kerry Melville in the film. She also portrayed tennis player Shaun Stafford in the 2021 film King Richard.

== Pickleball ==
Kaitlyn has mainly excelled at women's singles. As of March 2025, Kaitlyn is ranked third overall on the PPA tour in women's singles, with a career singles record of 55–25 across 23 professional tournaments, and a DUPR rating of 5.944 in the singles discipline.

== Tennis ==
Partnering with Sabrina Santamaria, Christian won her first WTA 125 doubles title at the 2021 Open de Saint-Malo, defeating Hayley Carter and Luisa Stefani in the final.

Having entered the tournament as alternates when second seeds Hailey Baptiste and Caty McNally withdrew, she won her biggest title in the doubles at the WTA 250 2022 Abierto Zapopan, playing with Lidziya Marozava and overcoming Wang Xinyu and Zhu Lin in the final.

=== Grand Slam doubles performance timeline ===
Key
W	F	SF	QF	#R	RR	Q#	DNQ	A	NH

(W) winner; (F) finalist; (SF) semifinalist; (QF) quarterfinalist; (#R) rounds 4, 3, 2, 1; (RR) round-robin stage; (Q#) qualification round; (DNQ) did not qualify; (A) absent; (NH) not held; (SR) strike rate (events won / competed); (W–L) win–loss record.
To avoid confusion and double counting, these charts are updated at the conclusion of a tournament or when the player's participation has ended.

Tournament	2015	...	2018	2019	2020	2021	2022	W–L
Australian Open	A		A	3R	2R	1R	1R	3–4
French Open	A		2R	1R	2R	1R	2R	3–5
Wimbledon	A		2R	1R	NH	2R	1R	2–4
US Open	1R		1R	1R	1R	1R	2R	1–6
Win–Loss	0–1		2–3	2–4	2–3	1–4	2–4	9–19

=== WTA Tour finals ===
==== Doubles: 6 (1 title, 5 runner-ups) ====
Legend Premier / WTA 500 (0–3) International / WTA 250 (1–2)	Finals by surface Hard (1–5)

Result	W–L	Date	Tournament	Tier	Surface	Partner	Opponents	Score
Loss	0–1	Mar 2018	Abierto Mexicano, Mexico	International	Hard	(United States) Sabrina Santamaria	(Germany) Tatjana Maria (United Kingdom) Heather Watson	5–7, 6–2, [2–10]
Loss	0–2	Oct 2019	Luxembourg Open	International	Hard (i)	(Chile) Alexa Guarachi	(United States) Coco Gauff (United States) Caty McNally	2–6, 2–6
Loss	0–3	Feb 2020	St. Petersburg Trophy, Russia	Premier	Hard (i)	(Chile) Alexa Guarachi	(Japan) Shuko Aoyama (Japan) Ena Shibahara	6–4, 0–6, [3–10]
Loss	0–4	Mar 2021	St. Petersburg Trophy, Russia	WTA 500	Hard (i)	(United States) Sabrina Santamaria	(Ukraine) Nadiia Kichenok (Romania) Raluca Olaru	6–2, 3–6, [8–10]
Loss	0–5	Sep 2021	Ostrava Open, Czech Republic	WTA 500	Hard (i)	(New Zealand) Erin Routliffe	(India) Sania Mirza (China) Zhang Shuai	3–6, 2–6
Win	1–5	Feb 2022	Abierto Zapopan, Mexico	WTA 250	Hard	(Belarus) Lidziya Marozava	(China) Wang Xinyu (China) Zhu Lin	7–5, 6–3

=== WTA 125 finals ===
==== Doubles: 1 (title) ====
Result	Date	Tournament	Surface	Partner	Opponents	Score
Win	May 2021	Open de Saint-Malo, France	Clay	(United States) Sabrina Santamaria	(United States) Hayley Carter (Brazil) Luisa Stefani	7–6^{(4)}, 4–6, [10–5]

=== ITF Circuit finals ===
==== Singles: 3 (1–2) ====
Legend $10,000 tournaments	Finals by surface Hard (1–2)

Result	No.	Date	Tournament	Tier	Surface	Opponent	Score
Loss	1.	Jul 2009	ITF Evansville, United States	10,000	Hard	(United States) Elizabeth Lumpkin	0–6, 2–6
Win	1.	Oct 2016	ITF Tarakan, Indonesia	10,000	Hard (i)	(Japan) Haruka Kaji	5–7, 6–3, 6–2
Loss	2.	Nov 2016	ITF Stellenbosch, South Africa	10,000	Hard	(South Africa) Chanel Simmonds	6–4, 3–6, 5–7

==== Doubles: 19 (13–6) ====
Legend $100,000 tournaments $80,000 tournaments $50/60,000 tournaments $25,000 tournaments $10,000 tournaments	Finals by surface Hard (11–4) Clay (2–2)

Result	No.	Date	Tournament	Tier	Surface	Partner	Opponents	Score
Win	1.	Jul 2009	ITF Atlanta, United States	10,000	Hard	(United States) Lindsey Nelson	(United States) Amanda Fink (United States) Yasmin Schnack	7–5, 7–6^{(2)}
Loss	1.	Jul 2009	ITF Evansville, US	10,000	Hard	(United States) Lindsey Nelson	(United States) Maria Sanchez (United States) Yasmin Schnack	6–4, 1–6, [4–10]
Win	2.	Jun 2010	ITF Mt. Pleasant, US	10,000	Clay	(United States) Caitlin Whoriskey	(Slovenia) Petra Rampre (United States) Shelby Rogers	6–4, 6–2
Loss	2.	Jun 2012	ITF Sacramento, US	50,000	Hard	(United States) Maria Sanchez	(United States) Yasmin Schnack (United States) Asia Muhammad	3–6, 6–7^{(4)}
Win	3.	Jul 2013	ITF Rimini, Italy	10,000	Clay	(United States) Sabrina Santamaria	(Italy) Giulia Gasparri (Switzerland) Lisa Sabino	6–2, 6–1
Win	4.	Feb 2015	ITF Surprise, US	25,000	Hard	(United States) Jacqueline Cako	(United Kingdom) Johanna Konta (United States) Maria Sanchez	6–4, 5–7, [10–7]
Win	5.	Mar 2015	ITF Metepec, Mexico	10,000	Hard	(Brazil) Maria Fernanda Alves	(Mexico) Victoria Rodríguez (Mexico) Marcela Zacarías	2–6, 6–1, [15–13]
Loss	3.	Jul 2015	Stockton Challenger, United States	50,000	Hard	(United States) Danielle Lao	(United States) Jamie Loeb (United States) Sanaz Marand	3–6, 4–6
Win	6.	Nov 2016	ITF Stellenbosch, South Africa	10,000	Hard	(South Africa) Chanel Simmonds	(Zimbabwe) Valeria Bhunu (Sweden) Linnea Malmqvist	6–0, 7–6^{(3)}
Loss	4.	May 2017	ITF Charleston Pro, United States	60,000	Clay	(United States) Sabrina Santamaria	(United States) Emina Bektas (Chile) Alexa Guarachi	7–5, 3–6, [5–10]
Win	7.	Jun 2017	ITF Sumter, US	25,000	Hard	(Mexico) Giuliana Olmos	(Australia) Ellen Perez (Brazil) Luisa Stefani	6–2, 3–6, [10–7]
Loss	5.	Sep 2017	Abierto Tampico, Mexico	100,000	Hard	(Mexico) Giuliana Olmos	(United States) Caroline Dolehide (Argentina) María Irigoyen	4–6, 4–6
Win	8.	Oct 2017	Templeton Open, US	60,000	Hard	(Mexico) Giuliana Olmos	(Switzerland) Viktorija Golubic (Switzerland) Amra Sadiković	7–5, 6–3
Win	9.	Oct 2017	Tennis Classic of Macon, United States	80,000	Hard	(United States) Sabrina Santamaria	(United States) Paula Cristina Gonçalves (United States) Sanaz Marand	6–1, 6–0
Win	10.	Feb 2018	Midland Tennis Classic, United States	100,000	Hard (i)	(United States) Sabrina Santamaria	(United States) Maria Sanchez (United States) Jessica Pegula	7–5, 4–6, [10–8]
Win	11.	Feb 2018	Rancho Santa Fe Open, United States	25,000	Hard	(United States) Sabrina Santamaria	(Czech Republic) Eva Hrdinová (United States) Taylor Townsend	6–7^{(6)}, 6–1, [10–6]
Win	12.	May 2018	Open de Cagnes-sur-Mer, France	100,000	Clay	(United States) Sabrina Santamaria	(Belarus) Vera Lapko (Kazakhstan) Galina Voskoboeva	2–6, 7–5, [10–7]
Loss	6.	Jul 2018	Budapest Ladies Open, Hungary	100,000	Clay	(Mexico) Giuliana Olmos	(Romania) Alexandra Cadanțu (Slovakia) Chantal Škamlová	1–6, 3–6
Win	13.	Mar 2022	Guanajuato Open, Mexico	60,000+H	Hard	(Belarus) Lidziya Marozava	(Russia) Anastasia Tikhonova (Latvia) Daniela Vismane	6–0, 6–2
