= 2020 L'Open 35 de Saint-Malo – Doubles =

Doubles
- 2020 L'Open 35 de Saint-Malo

Final
- Champions: (Poland) Paula Kania (Poland) Katarzyna Piter
- Runners-up: (Poland) Magdalena Fręch (Switzerland) Viktorija Golubic
- Score: 6–2, 6–4

Events
Singles	Doubles
← 2019 ·	L'Open 35 de Saint-Malo	· 2021 →

Ekaterine Gorgodze and Maryna Zanevska were the defending champions but chose not to participate.

Paula Kania and Katarzyna Piter won the title, defeating Magdalena Fręch and Viktorija Golubic in the final, 6–2, 6–4.

== Seeds ==
1. (Poland) Paula Kania / (Poland) Katarzyna Piter (champions)
2. (Norway) Ulrikke Eikeri / (Egypt) Mayar Sherif (quarterfinals, withdrew)
3. (Romania) Irina Bara / (Spain) Eva Guerrero Álvarez (quarterfinals)
4. (France) Amandine Hesse / (France) Harmony Tan (quarterfinals)

== Draw ==
=== Key ===
- Q = Qualifier
- WC = Wild card
- LL = Lucky loser
- Alt = Alternate
- SE = Special exempt
- PR = Protected ranking
- ITF = ITF entry
- JE = Junior exempt
- w/o = Walkover
- r = Retired
- d = Defaulted
- SR = Special ranking

=== Draw ===
First round
(France) C Burel (France) C Paquet	7^{7}	6
(Latvia) D Marcinkēviča (Chile) D Seguel	6^{1}	4
3	(Romania) I Bara (Spain) E Guerrero Álvarez	6	5	[10]
(Belarus) Y Hatouka (Belarus) A Kubareva	3	7	[8]
(Bulgaria) E Kostova (United States) V Lepchenko	6	6
(France) E Jacquemot (Russia) E Yashina	0	3
(Poland) M Fręch (Switzerland) V Golubic	6	6
(France) F Brugnone (Ukraine) M Kostiuk	2	2
(France) S Cakarevic (France) M Yerolymos	2	6	[4]
4	(France) A Hesse (France) H Tan	6	3	[10]
(France) E Mazzoni (France) J Mazzoni	0	1
(Spain) C Bucșa (Serbia) N Kostić	6	6
(France) A Albié (France) M Partaud	0	2
2	(Norway) U Eikeri (Egypt) M Sherif	6	6

Quarterfinals
1	(Poland) P Kania (Poland) K Piter	6	7
(France) C Burel (France) C Paquet	2	5
3	(Romania) I Bara (Spain) E Guerrero Álvarez	3	5
(Bulgaria) E Kostova (United States) V Lepchenko	6	7
(Poland) M Fręch (Switzerland) V Golubic	7^{7}	6^{5}	[10]
4	(France) A Hesse (France) H Tan	6^{2}	7^{7}	[4]
(Spain) C Bucșa (Serbia) N Kostić	w/o
2	(Norway) U Eikeri (Egypt) M Sherif

Semifinals
1	(Poland) P Kania (Poland) K Piter	6	7
(Bulgaria) E Kostova (United States) V Lepchenko	1	5
(Poland) M Fręch (Switzerland) V Golubic	3	6	[10]
(Spain) C Bucșa (Serbia) N Kostić	6	4	[8]

Final
1	(Poland) P Kania (Poland) K Piter	6	6
(Poland) M Fręch (Switzerland) V Golubic	2	4
