= Tereza Mrdeža =

Croatian tennis player (born 1990)

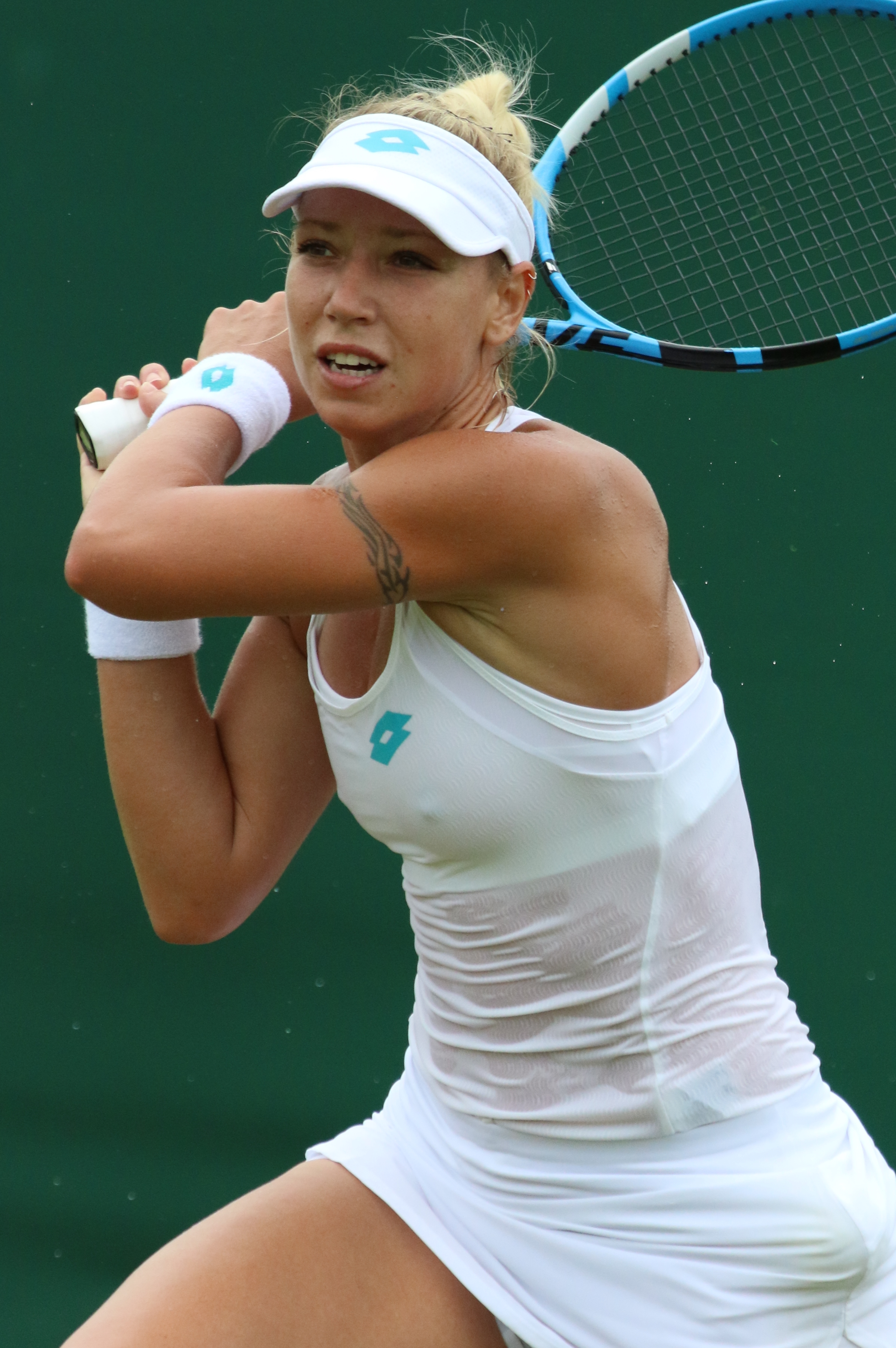
- Mrdeža at the 2019 Wimbledon qualifying
- Country (sports): Croatia
- Born: 14 November 1990 (age 35) Pula, SR Croatia, Yugoslavia
- Height: 1.73 m (5 ft 8 in)
- Turned pro: 2007
- Retired: 2026
- Plays: Right (two-handed backhand)
- Coach: Juraj Dusparić
- Prize money: US$ 622,996

Singles
- Career record: 419–302
- Career titles: 8 ITF
- Highest ranking: No. 150 (12 October 2015)

Grand Slam singles results
- Australian Open: Q3 (2013)
- French Open: Q3 (2015)
- Wimbledon: Q2 (2019)
- US Open: 1R (2015)

Doubles
- Career record: 108–112
- Career titles: 4 ITF
- Highest ranking: No. 163 (23 April 2018)

Tereza Mrdeža (born 14 November 1990) is a Croatian former professional tennis player.

She won eight titles in singles and four in doubles on the ITF Women's Circuit. On 12 October 2015, she achieved her best singles ranking of world No. 150. On 23 April 2018, she peaked at No. 163 in the doubles rankings.

Mrdeža made her Fed Cup debut in 2012. Playing for Croatia Fed Cup team, she has a win–loss record of 5–4.

She was inactive on tour from February 2023 until the 2026 Australian Open. Mrdeza retired from professional tennis in May 2026, having made her final appearance at the 2026 French Open.

== Grand Slam performance timeline ==
Key
W	F	SF	QF	#R	RR	Q#	DNQ	A	NH

(W) winner; (F) finalist; (SF) semifinalist; (QF) quarterfinalist; (#R) rounds 4, 3, 2, 1; (RR) round-robin stage; (Q#) qualification round; (DNQ) did not qualify; (A) absent; (NH) not held; (SR) strike rate (events won / competed); (W–L) win–loss record.
To avoid confusion and double counting, these charts are updated at the conclusion of a tournament or when the player's participation has ended.

== ITF Circuit finals ==
=== Singles: 26 (8 titles, 18 runner-ups) ===
Legend $50/60,000 tournaments $25,000 tournaments $10,000 tournaments	Finals by surface Hard (2–3) Clay (6–15)

Result	W–L	Date	Tournament	Tier	Surface	Opponent	Score
Loss	0–1	Apr 2007	ITF Bol, Croatia	10,000	Clay	(Sweden) Johanna Larsson	1–6, 3–6
Loss	0–2	May 2008	ITF Budva, Montenegro	10,000	Clay	(Hungary) Palma Kiraly	5–7, 1–6
Win	1–2	Jun 2008	ITF Sarajevo, Bosnia & Herzegovina	10,000	Clay	(Slovenia) Jasmina Kajtazovič	6–3, 6–0
Loss	1–3	Apr 2009	ITF Hvar, Croatia	10,000	Clay	(Poland) Karolina Kosińska	4–6, 3–6
Loss	1–4	Apr 2009	ITF Bol, Croatia	10,000	Clay	(Italy) Valentina Sulpizio	6–3, 3–6, 4–6
Loss	1–5	Jul 2009	ITF Kharkiv, Ukraine	25,000	Clay	(Australia) Monique Adamczak	7–5, 1–6, 4–6
Win	2–5	Oct 2011	ITF Umag, Croatia	10,000	Clay	(Slovakia) Zuzana Zlochová	7–6^{(2)}, 4–6, 6–2
Loss	2–6	Mar 2012	ITF Fort Walton Beach, United States	25,000	Hard	(United States) Madison Brengle	4–6, 6–3, 3–6
Loss	2–7	May 2012	Chiasso Open, Switzerland	25,000	Clay	(Switzerland) Amra Sadiković	3–6, 3–6
Loss	2–8	Jun 2012	ITF Rome, Italy	25,000	Clay	(Spain) María Teresa Torró Flor	3–6, 0–6
Loss	2–9	Jul 2012	ITF Les Contamines, France	25,000	Hard	(France) Séverine Beltrame	2–6, 2–6
Loss	2–10	Apr 2014	Chiasso Open, Switzerland	25,000	Clay	(Czech Republic) Lucie Hradecká	3–6, 6–7^{(4)}
Loss	2–11	Jun 2014	ITF La Marsa, Tunisia	25,000	Clay	(Venezuela) Andrea Gámiz	6–3, 0–6, 4–6
Win	3–11	Nov 2014	ITF Margaret River, Australia	25,000	Hard	(Sweden) Rebecca Peterson	6–3, 6–3
Loss	3–12	Feb 2015	Launceston International, Australia	50,000	Hard	(Russia) Daria Gavrilova	1–6, 2–6
Win	4–12	Sep 2015	ITF Monterrey, Mexico	25,000	Hard	(Chile) Alexa Guarachi	6–0, 6–7^{(2)}, 6–3
Loss	4–13	May 2016	ITF Tučepi, Croatia	10,000	Clay	(Croatia) Ani Mijačika	3–6, 6–1, 3–6
Win	5–13	May 2016	ITF Bol, Croatia	10,000	Clay	(Croatia) Tena Lukas	6–4, 0–6, 6–1
Win	6–13	Oct 2016	ITF Pula, Italy	25,000	Clay	(Netherlands) Cindy Burger	6–3, 6–4
Loss	6–14	May 2017	ITF Rome, Italy	25,000	Clay	(Austria) Julia Grabher	5–7, 0–6
Loss	6–15	Sep 2017	ITF Pula, Italy	25,000	Clay	(Venezuela) Andrea Gámiz	7–5, 5–7, 2–6
Loss	6–16	Oct 2017	ITF Pula, Italy	25,000	Clay	(Slovenia) Tamara Zidanšek	6–7^{(4)}, 5–7
Win	7–16	Sep 2018	Zagreb Ladies Open, Croatia	60,000	Clay	(Argentina) Paula Ormaechea	2–6, 6–4, 7–5
Win	8–16	Sep 2018	ITF Pula, Italy	25,000	Clay	(Czech Republic) Anastasia Zarycká	2–6, 7–5, 6–4
Loss	8–17	Jan 2020	ITF Vero Beach, United States	25,000	Clay	(Chile) Daniela Seguel	5–7, 4–6
Loss	8–18	Sep 2020	Zagreb Ladies Open, Croatia	25,000	Clay	(Croatia) Ana Konjuh	4–6, 2–6

=== Doubles: 15 (4 titles, 11 runner-ups) ===
Legend $50/60,000 tournaments $25,000 tournaments	Finals by surface Hard (0–2) Clay (4–9)

Result	W–L	Date	Tournament	Tier	Surface	Partner	Opponents	Score
Loss	0–1	May 2011	ITF Izmir, Turkey	25,000	Hard	(Romania) Mihaela Buzărnescu	(United Kingdom) Naomi Broady (United Kingdom) Lisa Whybourn	6–3, 6–7^{(4)}, [7–10]
Win	1–1	Nov 2011	ITF Asunción, Paraguay	25,000	Clay	(United States) Julia Cohen	(Argentina) Mailen Auroux (Argentina) María Irigoyen	6–3, 2–6, [10–5]
Win	2–1	Apr 2012	ITF Jackson, United States	25,000	Clay	(Russia) Elena Bovina	(Argentina) Mailen Auroux (Argentina) María Irigoyen	6–3, 6–3
Loss	2–2	May 2012	ITF Brescia, Italy	25,000	Clay	(Slovenia) Maša Zec Peškirič	(Italy) Corinna Dentoni (Latvia) Diāna Marcinkēviča	2–6, 1–6
Loss	2–3	Jul 2012	Contrexéville Open, France	50,000	Clay	(Croatia) Silvia Njirić	(Ukraine) Yuliya Beygelzimer (Czech Republic) Renata Voráčová	1–6, 1–6
Win	3–3	Apr 2017	ITF Pula, Italy	25,000	Clay	(Romania) Irina Bara	(France) Sara Cakarevic (Romania) Nicoleta Dascălu	6–4, 6–2
Loss	3–4	May 2017	ITF La Marsa, Tunisia	25,000	Clay	(Bosnia and Herzegovina) Dea Herdželaš	(Poland) Katarzyna Kawa (Bosnia and Herzegovina) Jasmina Tinjić	5–7, 4–6
Loss	3–5	Jun 2017	Grado Tennis Cup, Italy	25,000	Clay	(Switzerland) Conny Perrin	(Israel) Julia Glushko (Australia) Priscilla Hon	5–7, 2–6
Loss	3–6	Jun 2017	Hódmezővásárhely Open, Hungary	60,000	Clay	(Norway) Ulrikke Eikeri	(Japan) Kotomi Takahata (India) Prarthana Thombare	0–1 ret.
Loss	3–7	Aug 2017	ITF Leipzig, Germany	25,000	Clay	(India) Ankita Raina	(Russia) Valentyna Ivakhnenko (Belarus) Lidziya Marozava	2–6, 1–6
Win	4–7	Sep 2017	ITF Pula, Italy	25,000	Clay	(Italy) Claudia Giovine	(Brazil) Gabriela Cé (Argentina) Catalina Pella	6–3, 6–1
Loss	4–8	Oct 2017	ITF Pula, Italy	25,000	Clay	(Japan) Akiko Omae	(Romania) Elena Bogdan (Russia) Valeriya Solovyeva	6–7^{(7)}, 7–5, [9–11]
Loss	4–9	Jun 2018	ITF Padova, Italy	25,000	Clay	(Bosnia and Herzegovina) Dea Herdželaš	(Turkey) İpek Soylu (Czech Republic) Anastasia Zarycká	4–6, 1–6
Loss	4–10	Oct 2018	ITF Istanbul, Turkey	25,000	Hard (i)	(Serbia) Nina Stojanović	(Russia) Ekaterina Kazionova (Russia) Polina Monova	3–6, 7–6^{(5)}, [6–10]
Loss	4–11	Sep 2019	Open de Saint-Malo, France	60,000+H	Clay	(Spain) Aliona Bolsova	(Georgia (country)) Ekaterine Gorgodze (Belgium) Maryna Zanevska	7–6^{(8)}, 5–7, [8–10]

== Fed Cup/Billie Jean King Cup participation ==
=== Singles (1–3) ===
Edition	Stage	Date	Location	Against	Surface	Opponent	W/L	Score
2012	Z1 P/O	Feb 2012	Eilat (ISR)	Bosnia and Herzegovina	Hard	Jasmina Tinjić	W	1–0 ret.
2013	Z1 R/R	Feb 2013	Eilat (ISR)	Austria	Hard	Patricia Mayr-Achleitner	L	3–6, 5–7
2014	Z1 R/R	Feb 2014	Budapest (HUN)	Belgium	Hard (i)	Alison Van Uytvanck	L	4–6, 6–1, 2–6
2014	Z1 P/O	Feb 2014	Budapest (HUN)	Turkey	Hard (i)	İpek Soylu	L	4–6, 6–1, 0–6

=== Doubles (4–1) ===
Edition	Stage	Date	Location	Against	Surface	Partner	Opponents	W/L	Score
2012	Z1 R/R	Feb 2012	Eilat (ISR)	Luxembourg	Hard	Ani Mijačika	Anne Kremer; Claudine Schaul	W	6–1, 6–3
2013	Z1 R/R	Feb 2013	Eilat (ISR)	(Georgia (country)) Georgia	Hard	Darija Jurak	Sofia Shapatava; Ekaterine Gorgodze	W	6–3, 6–2
2013	Z1 R/R	Feb 2013	Eilat (ISR)	Belarus	Hard	Darija Jurak	Lidziya Marozava; Aliaksandra Sasnovich	W	7–6^{(2)}, 6–3
2014	Z1 R/R	Feb 2014	Budapest (HUN)	Belgium	Hard (i)	Darija Jurak	Alison Van Uytvanck; Yanina Wickmayer	L	6–0, 4–6, 4–6
2014	Z1 P/O	Feb 2014	Budapest (HUN)	Turkey	Hard (i)	Darija Jurak	Çağla Büyükakçay; İpek Soylu	W	7–6^{(4)}, 4–6, 6–3
