= L'Open 35 de Saint-Malo =

WTA 125K series
- Event name: L'Open 35 de Saint-Malo (2018–); L'Open Emeraude Solaire de Saint-Malo (2014–2017); Open GDF Suez de Bretagne (–2013)
- Location: Saint-Malo, France
- Venue: Tennis Club J.A Saint-Malo
- Category: WTA 125
- Surface: Clay
- Draw: 32S/16Q/16D
- Prize money: €100,000
- Website: Official website

Current champions (2026)
- Singles: (Japan) Moyuka Uchijima
- Doubles: (Netherlands) Isabelle Haverlag (United Kingdom) Maia Lumsden

The L'Open 35 de Saint-Malo is a French tournament for professional female tennis players played on outdoor clay courts. The event was upgraded from the ITF Women's Circuit to the WTA 125K series in 2021. It was held in Dinan between 1996 and 2007. The tournament has been held since 1996 and since 2008 in Saint-Malo.

== Past finals ==
=== Singles ===
| Year | Champion | Runner-up | Score |
|---|---|---|---|
| 2026 | (Japan) Moyuka Uchijima | (Czech Republic) Tereza Valentová | 6–7^{(2–7)}, 6–3, 6–1 |
| 2025 | (Japan) Naomi Osaka | (Slovenia) Kaja Juvan | 6–1, 7–5 |
| 2024 | (France) Loïs Boisson | (France) Chloé Paquet | 4–6, 7–6^{(7–3)}, 6–3 |
| 2023 | (United States) Sloane Stephens | (Belgium) Greet Minnen | 6–3, 6–4 |
| 2022 | (Brazil) Beatriz Haddad Maia | Anna Blinkova | 7–6^{(7–3)}, 6–3 |
| 2021 | (Switzerland) Viktorija Golubic | (Italy) Jasmine Paolini | 6–1, 6–3 |
⬆️ WTA $125,000 event ⬆️
| 2020 | (Argentina) Nadia Podoroska | (Spain) Cristina Bucșa | 4–6, 7–5, 6–2 |
| 2019 | (Russia) Varvara Gracheva | (Ukraine) Marta Kostyuk | 6–3, 6–2 |
| 2018 | (Russia) Liudmila Samsonova | (Ukraine) Katarina Zavatska | 6–0, 6–2 |
| 2017 | (Slovenia) Polona Hercog | (Latvia) Diāna Marcinkēviča | 6–3, 6–3 |
| 2016 | (Ukraine) Maryna Zanevska (2) | (Italy) Camilla Rosatello | 6–1, 6–3 |
| 2015 | (Russia) Daria Kasatkina | (Germany) Laura Siegemund | 7–5, 7–6^{(7–4)} |
| 2014 | (Germany) Carina Witthöft | (Italy) Alberta Brianti | 6–0, 6–1 |
| 2013 | (Brazil) Teliana Pereira | (France) Pauline Parmentier | 6–2, 6–1 |
| 2012 | (Ukraine) Maryna Zanevska | (Spain) Estrella Cabeza Candela | 6–2, 6–7^{(5–7)}, 6–0 |
| 2011 | (Romania) Sorana Cîrstea | (Spain) Sílvia Soler Espinosa | 6–2, 6–2 |
| 2010 | (Italy) Romina Oprandi | (France) Alizé Cornet | 6–2, 2–6, 6–2 |
| 2009 | (Spain) Arantxa Parra Santonja | (Romania) Alexandra Dulgheru | 6–4, 6–3 |
| 2008 | (France) Stéphanie Cohen-Aloro | (Croatia) Jelena Kostanić Tošić | 6–2, 7–5 |
| 2007 | (Slovenia) Maša Zec Peškirič | (Italy) Karin Knapp | 6–4, 6–2 |
| 2006 | (Switzerland) Timea Bacsinszky (2) | (Russia) Yaroslava Shvedova | 4–6, 7–5, 6–2 |
| 2005 | (Italy) Roberta Vinci | (Czech Republic) Zuzana Ondrášková | 7–5, 7–5 |
| 2004 | (Switzerland) Timea Bacsinszky | (Israel) Tzipi Obziler | 6–2, 6–1 |
| 2003 | (Czech Republic) Eva Birnerová | (Czech Republic) Zuzana Ondrášková | 1–6, 6–2, 6–3 |
| 2002 | (France) Émilie Loit (3) | (Czech Republic) Zuzana Ondrášková | 6–2, 7–5 |
| 2001 | (Netherlands) Seda Noorlander | (Romania) Cătălina Cristea | 6–4, 6–2 |
| 2000 | (Austria) Melanie Schnell | (Ukraine) Julia Vakulenko | 2–6, 6–1, 6–2 |
| 1999 | (Bulgaria) Lubomira Bacheva | (France) Stéphanie Foretz | 6–2, 2–6, 6–1 |
| 1998 | (France) Émilie Loit (2) | (France) Élodie Le Bescond | 6–1, 6–1 |
| 1997 | (France) Émilie Loit | (France) Emmanuelle Curutchet | 6–2, 7–6 |
| 1996 | (Tunisia) Selima Sfar | (France) Virginie Massart | 6–4, 7–6 |

=== Doubles ===
| Year | Champions | Runners-up | Score |
|---|---|---|---|
| 2026 | (Netherlands) Isabelle Haverlag (United Kingdom) Maia Lumsden (2) | (Chinese Taipei) Chan Hao-ching (United States) Ivana Corley | 6–4, 6–0 |
| 2025 | (United Kingdom) Maia Lumsden (Japan) Makoto Ninomiya (2) | (Georgia (country)) Oksana Kalashnikova (Italy) Angelica Moratelli | 7–5, 6–2 |
| 2024 | Amina Anshba (Czech Republic) Anastasia Dețiuc | (France) Estelle Cascino (France) Carole Monnet | 7–6^{(9–7)}, 2–6, [10–5] |
| 2023 | (Belgium) Greet Minnen (Netherlands) Bibiane Schoofs | (Norway) Ulrikke Eikeri (Japan) Eri Hozumi | 7–6^{(9–7)}, 7–6^{(7–3)} |
| 2022 | (Japan) Eri Hozumi (Japan) Makoto Ninomiya | (France) Estelle Cascino (France) Jessika Ponchet | 7–6^{(7–1)}, 6–1 |
| 2021 | (United States) Kaitlyn Christian (United States) Sabrina Santamaria | (United States) Hayley Carter (Brazil) Luisa Stefani | 7–6^{(7–4)}, 4–6, [10–5] |
⬆️ WTA $125,000 event ⬆️
| 2020 | (Poland) Paula Kania (Poland) Katarzyna Piter | (Poland) Magdalena Fręch (Switzerland) Viktorija Golubic | 6–2, 6–4 |
| 2019 | (Georgia (country)) Ekaterine Gorgodze (Belgium) Maryna Zanevska | (Spain) Aliona Bolsova (Croatia) Tereza Mrdeža | 6–7^{(8–10)}, 7–5, [10–8] |
| 2018 | (Spain) Cristina Bucșa (Colombia) María Fernanda Herazo | (Romania) Alexandra Cadanțu (Latvia) Diāna Marcinkēviča | 4–6, 6–1, [10–8] |
| 2017 | (Latvia) Diāna Marcinkēviča (2) (Chile) Daniela Seguel | (Romania) Irina Bara (Romania) Mihaela Buzărnescu | 6–3, 6–3 |
| 2016 | (North Macedonia) Lina Gjorcheska (Latvia) Diāna Marcinkēviča | (Romania) Alexandra Cadanțu (Romania) Jaqueline Cristian | 3–6, 6–3, [10–8] |
| 2015 | (Slovakia) Kristína Kučová (Latvia) Anastasija Sevastova | (Russia) Maria Marfutina (Russia) Natalia Vikhlyantseva | 6–7^{(1–7)}, 6–3, [10–5] |
| 2014 | (Italy) Giulia Gatto-Monticone (Italy) Anastasia Grymalska | (Argentina) Tatiana Búa (Spain) Beatriz García Vidagany | 6–3, 6–1 |
| 2013 | (Bulgaria) Elitsa Kostova (Argentina) Florencia Molinero | (Liechtenstein) Kathinka von Deichmann (Germany) Nina Zander | 6–2, 6–4 |
| 2012 | (Turkey) Pemra Özgen (Ukraine) Alyona Sotnikova | (Bulgaria) Aleksandrina Naydenova (Brazil) Teliana Pereira | 6–4, 7–6^{(8–6)} |
| 2011 | (Russia) Nina Bratchikova (Croatia) Darija Jurak (2) | (Sweden) Johanna Larsson (Germany) Jasmin Wöhr | 6–4, 6–2 |
| 2010 | (Czech Republic) Petra Cetkovská (Czech Republic) Lucie Hradecká | (Ukraine) Mariya Koryttseva (Romania) Ioana Raluca Olaru | 6–4, 6–2 |
| 2009 | (Switzerland) Timea Bacsinszky (Italy) Tathiana Garbin | (Slovenia) Andreja Klepač (France) Aurélie Védy | 6–3, retired |
| 2008 | (Spain) María José Martínez Sánchez (Spain) Arantxa Parra Santonja | (Czech Republic) Renata Voráčová (Belarus) Anastasiya Yakimova | 6–2, 6–1 |
| 2007 | (Germany) Angelique Kerber (Austria) Yvonne Meusburger | (France) Stéphanie Foretz (France) Aurélie Védy | 6–4, 6–7^{(6–8)}, 6–2 |
| 2006 | (Poland) Klaudia Jans (Slovakia) Henrieta Nagyová | (Romania) Mădălina Gojnea (Poland) Agnieszka Radwańska | 3–6, 6–2, 6–4 |
| 2005 | (Netherlands) Michaëlla Krajicek (Hungary) Ágnes Szávay | (Ukraine) Yuliya Beygelzimer (Germany) Sandra Klösel | 7–5, 7–5 |
| 2004 | (Croatia) Darija Jurak (Russia) Galina Voskoboeva | (Russia) Goulnara Fattakhetdinova (Russia) Anastasia Rodionova | 6–3, 6–2 |
| 2003 | (Czech Republic) Gabriela Navrátilová (Czech Republic) Michaela Paštiková | (Russia) Goulnara Fattakhetdinova (Russia) Galina Fokina | 1–6, 6–2, 6–3 |
| 2002 | (France) Caroline Dhenin (France) Émilie Loit | (Ukraine) Yuliya Beygelzimer (Belgium) Patty Van Acker | 6–3, 6–1 |
| 2001 | (Greece) Eleni Daniilidou (Germany) Caroline Schneider | (Germany) Vanessa Henke (Germany) Syna Schmidle | 6–3, 7–6^{(7–4)} |
| 2000 | (Germany) Vanessa Henke (Germany) Syna Schmidle | (France) Stéphanie Foretz (Belgium) Patty Van Acker | 6–7^{(2–7)}, 6–4, 6–2 |
| 1999 | (Slovakia) Janette Husárová (Hungary) Rita Kuti-Kis | (Spain) Rosa María Andrés Rodríguez (Spain) Mariam Ramón Climent | 6–4, 6–2 |
| 1998 | (France) Camille Pin (France) Aurélie Védy | (Italy) Tathiana Garbin (Romania) Oana Elena Golimbioschi | walkover |
| 1997 | (France) Cécile de Winne (France) Sophie Georges | (France) Émilie Loit (France) Laëtitia Sanchez | 7–5, 6–2 |
| 1996 | (Greece) Ariadne Katsouli (France) Bérangère Quillot | (Czech Republic) Pavlina Bartůňková (Russia) Alina Jidkova | 6–2, 6–2 |
