= Varvara Gracheva =

French tennis player (born 2000)

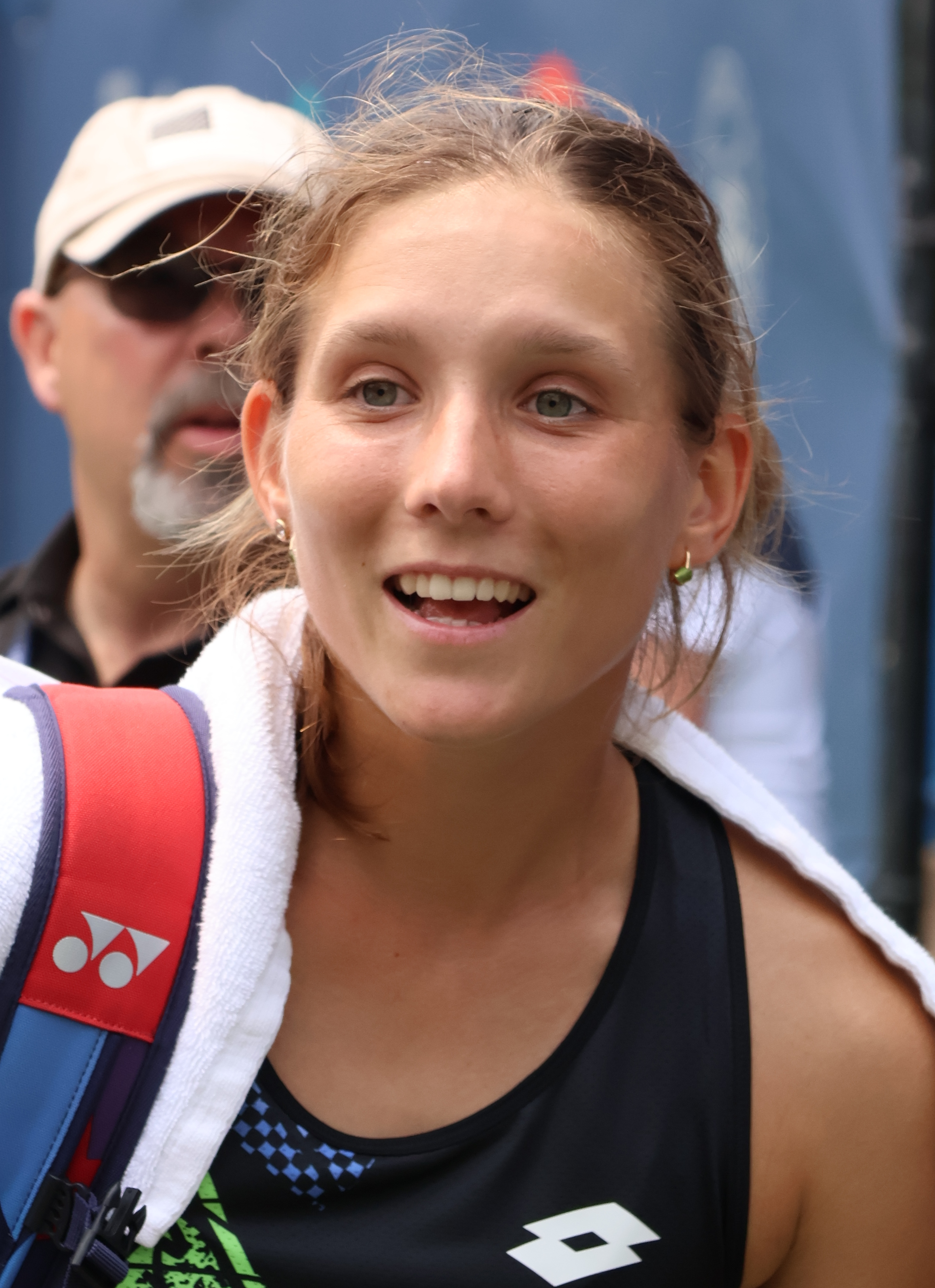
- Gracheva at the 2023 Washington Open
- Full name: Varvara Andreyevna Gracheva
- Native name: Варвара Андреевна Грачева
- Country (sports): Russia (2017–June 2023); France (June 2023–present)
- Born: 2 August 2000 (age 26) Moscow, Russia
- Height: 1.78 m (5 ft 10 in)
- Plays: Right-handed (two-handed backhand)
- Coach: Caleb Simms
- Prize money: US$ 4,291,230

Singles
- Career record: 304–223
- Career titles: 7 ITF
- Highest ranking: No. 39 (8 January 2024)
- Current ranking: No. 162 (28 September 2026)

Grand Slam singles results
- Australian Open: 3R (2023)
- French Open: 4R (2024)
- Wimbledon: 2R (2023, 2024)
- US Open: 3R (2020, 2021)

Other tournaments
- Olympic Games: 1R (2024)

Doubles
- Career record: 12–45
- Career titles: 0
- Highest ranking: No. 135 (21 March 2022)
- Current ranking: No. 1304 (28 September 2026)

Grand Slam doubles results
- Australian Open: 1R (2022, 2024, 2025)
- French Open: 2R (2020, 2021)
- Wimbledon: 3R (2021)
- US Open: 2R (2021)

Other doubles tournaments
- Olympic Games: 1R (2024)
- Last updated on: 9 October 2026.

Varvara Andreyevna Gracheva (Russian: Варвара Андреевна Грачёва, IPA: [vɐrˈvarə ɡrɐˈtɕɵvə]; born 2 August 2000) is a Russian-born French professional tennis player. Gracheva has a career-high WTA singles ranking of 39, achieved on 8 January 2024. She has won seven singles titles on the ITF World Tour.

== Early life ==
Varvara Gracheva was born on 2 August 2000 in Moscow, Russia. She was introduced to tennis by her mother, Natalia Kazakova, a tennis coach who trained her until the age of 14. Gracheva initially trained at the Meteor sports centre in nearby Zhukovsky, where limited tennis facilities prompted her to seek better training opportunities abroad.

Gracheva subsequently moved to Germany, where she trained with former professional tennis player Nina Bratchikova. At the age of 16, she relocated to Cannes, France, to continue her development at the Elite Tennis Center, founded by Jean-René Lisnard. Gracheva initially trained under Lisnard and later worked with Xavier Pujo.

== Career ==
=== 2016: Four juniors titles ===
Gracheva reached a career-high ranking of No. 19 in her junior career on 2 January 2016, winning four Grade-2 events.

=== 2017: Turning professional ===
Gracheva played her first professional events in 2017, starting off unranked but managed to reach a ranking of No. 647 by the end of the year, after reaching three consecutive $15k tournaments in Hammamet, Tunisia, defeating the likes of Fiona Ferro in the process.

=== 2018: Last junior year, top 500 ===
After defeating Sofia Shapatava to win a 15k tournament in Antalya, Turkey to begin her 2018 season, Gracheva returned to playing her final junior tournaments and did not compete on the ITF Circuit for six months. Nonetheless, she was able to reach her first 25k quarterfinal in Périgueux and made her top 500 debut in July as a result. Gracheva had three top 300 wins, including one over Maryna Zanevska in the qualifying rounds of the Dubai Tennis Challenge.

She ended the year with a 28–13 winning record on the professional tour as the world No. 447.

=== 2019: Rapid rise in the rankings, WTA Tour and top 125 debut ===
Despite a sluggish start to the year which saw Gracheva reach just one quarterfinal on hardcourts, she achieved good results on clay. Coming through the qualifying rounds at a 25k event in Chiasso, she won the biggest title thus far and entered the top 400 for the first time in her career. She followed it up with an upset over fifth seed and world No. 118, Nao Hibino, at the 80k Open de Cagnes-sur-Mer. Gracheva went on to win two 25k titles, the first in Caserta, Italy, and second at the Open Montpellier Méditerranée Métropole Hérault.

With her ranking qualifying her for some tournaments, she made her debut on the WTA Tour at the Ladies Open Lausanne, where she qualified for the main draw by defeating Julia Grabher in the final round, losing just two games. She lost to Han Xinyun in the first round, in straight sets. Gracheva then competed on hardcourts for the first time since April at the Washington Open, where she qualified once again. This time, she earned her first main draw win over Anna Blinkova in three sets, for her first top 100 win, and then fell to world No. 31, Hsieh Su-wei, in a final-set tiebreak. Nonetheless, she secured herself a top 200 debut.

Competing in a major event for the first time in her career, she advanced to the final qualifying round of the US Open beating Martina Trevisan and Danka Kovinić, in straight sets. She was defeated in the final round by Richèl Hogenkamp, in two tight sets.

Gracheva then returned onto clay, starting a 14-match winning streak with two consecutive titles at 60k events, the Open de Saint-Malo and the Open de Valencia. In Saint-Malo, she earned top 100 wins over Aliona Bolsova (who reached the fourth round at Roland Garros) and Natalia Vikhlyantseva before defeating Marta Kostyuk in the final. In Valencia, she dropped just 22 games all week and beat Tamara Korpatsch to win her second consecutive title. She reached a career-high ranking of world No. 121 after the tournament.

Playing at her home tournament, the Kremlin Cup, for the first time in her career, she qualified for the main draw and beat Ajla Tomljanović to reach the second round. She led Anastasia Pavlyuchenkova by a set and a break, but could not hold onto her lead as she fell in three sets.

She ended the year with a 70–26 record, ending the year as the world No. 105 despite starting the year as No. 447, and was labelled as one of the rising stars.

=== 2020: Consistency on WTA Tour, US Open 3rd round, top 100 ===
Gracheva reached the final round of qualifying at the Australian Open with wins over Chloé Paquet and Olga Danilović, but fell at the final hurdle to former world No. 45, Johanna Larsson. It was the beginning of a five-match losing streak for the Russian before the COVID-19 pandemic halted the 2020 WTA Tour. Nonetheless, she was able to make her top 100 debut on 2 March 2020, just in time before the suspension of the tournaments.

She was part of the first tournament of the WTA Tour's resumption, the Palermo Ladies Open, as the top seed in qualifying. She ended her losing streak with a win over local wildcard Matilde Paoletti, but was stunned by Martina Trevisan in the final qualifying round.

Gracheva finally made her main-draw debut at the US Open, and upset the higher-ranked Paula Badosa in straight sets to triumph on her main draw debut. In the second round, she pulled off one of the biggest comebacks in history by overturning a 1–6, 1–5 deficit against 30th seed Kristina Mladenovic, saving multiple match points to reach the third round for the first time in her career. Although she eventually lost to eighth seed Petra Martić in a tight contest in the third round, her performance made her receive the limelight.

Gracheva also made her French Open main-draw debut, but lost to eventual quarterfinalist and third seed, Elina Svitolina, in a straight-setter in the first round. Her year ended with a second-round appearance at the Upper Austria Ladies Linz, after defeating Katarina Zavatska in the first round.

She ended the year with a 10–14 win–loss record, three of those wins coming at WTA Tour main-draw level, and inside the top 100 for the first time in her career.

=== 2021: Full WTA Tour season & semifinal, top 80 ===
Gracheva was part of the contingent that travelled to Melbourne for the Australian Open, starting her season with a tough three-set win over Lizette Cabrera in the first round of the Yarra Valley Classic. She triumphed on her Australian Open main-draw debut defeating compatriot Anna Blinkova, before losing to another compatriot, Veronika Kudermetova, in the second round. Gracheva ended her journey in Australia with a second-round appearance at the Phillip Island Trophy, stunning former Grand Slam champion Sloane Stephens, in straight sets, before she lost to eventual champion Daria Kasatkina.

After a poor run of results, Gracheva reached the semifinals of the WTA 125 Open de Saint-Malo, upsetting second seed Rebecca Peterson in straight sets. She reached the third round of the French Open for the first time in her career, upsetting Camila Giorgi before losing in straight sets to Marta Kostyuk.

Her first grass-court tournaments ended in defeat at the Bad Homburg Open and the Wimbledon Championships, where she made her debut having not participated in the qualifying rounds previously.

At the Chicago Women's Open, Gracheva reached her first WTA Tour semifinal when she defeated fourth seed Tamara Zidanšek and upset eighth seed Marta Kostyuk in three sets, avenging her Roland Garros defeat. She was a set away from her maiden WTA Tour final, but could not hold onto her lead as she lost to Alizé Cornet, winning just one game after taking the opening set having played two matches a day.

She defended her points at the US Open, where she stunned 24th seed Paula Badosa (who would reach the top 10 two months later) in straight sets to reach the third round for the second consecutive year. Gracheva's run ended in the hands of 14th seed Anastasia Pavlyuchenkova, in straight sets.

The Russian reached her third quarterfinal of the year at the Astana Open as the seventh seed, defeating Kristýna Plíšková and Lesia Tsurenko in straight sets. At the Tenerife Ladies Open, she pulled off yet another big comeback, this time coming over the higher-ranked Sara Sorribes Tormo in the first round, after overturning a 1–5 final set deficit to prevail after more than 3 1/2 hours of action.

Gracheva ended the season with a semifinal appearance at the Open de Limoges, finishing the year inside the top 80 for the first time in her career.

=== 2022: Second French Open 3rd round, top 60 ===
Gracheva started into the year at the Melbourne Summer Set but was soundly beaten by Sorana Cîrstea without winning a game. Her poor run extended with a first-round exit at the Australian Open, falling to qualifier Lucia Bronzetti in three sets.

At the St. Petersburg Ladies' Trophy, she qualified for the main draw. At the Dubai Championships, she defeated Ajla Tomljanović in the first round, after also winning three qualifying rounds. As a result, she reached a new career-high ranking of No. 72 after the tournament.

She made the third round at the French Open for the second time in her career. As a result, she reached a new career-high ranking of No. 59, on 18 July 2022.

=== 2023: WTA Tour final & top-5 win, top 50 ===
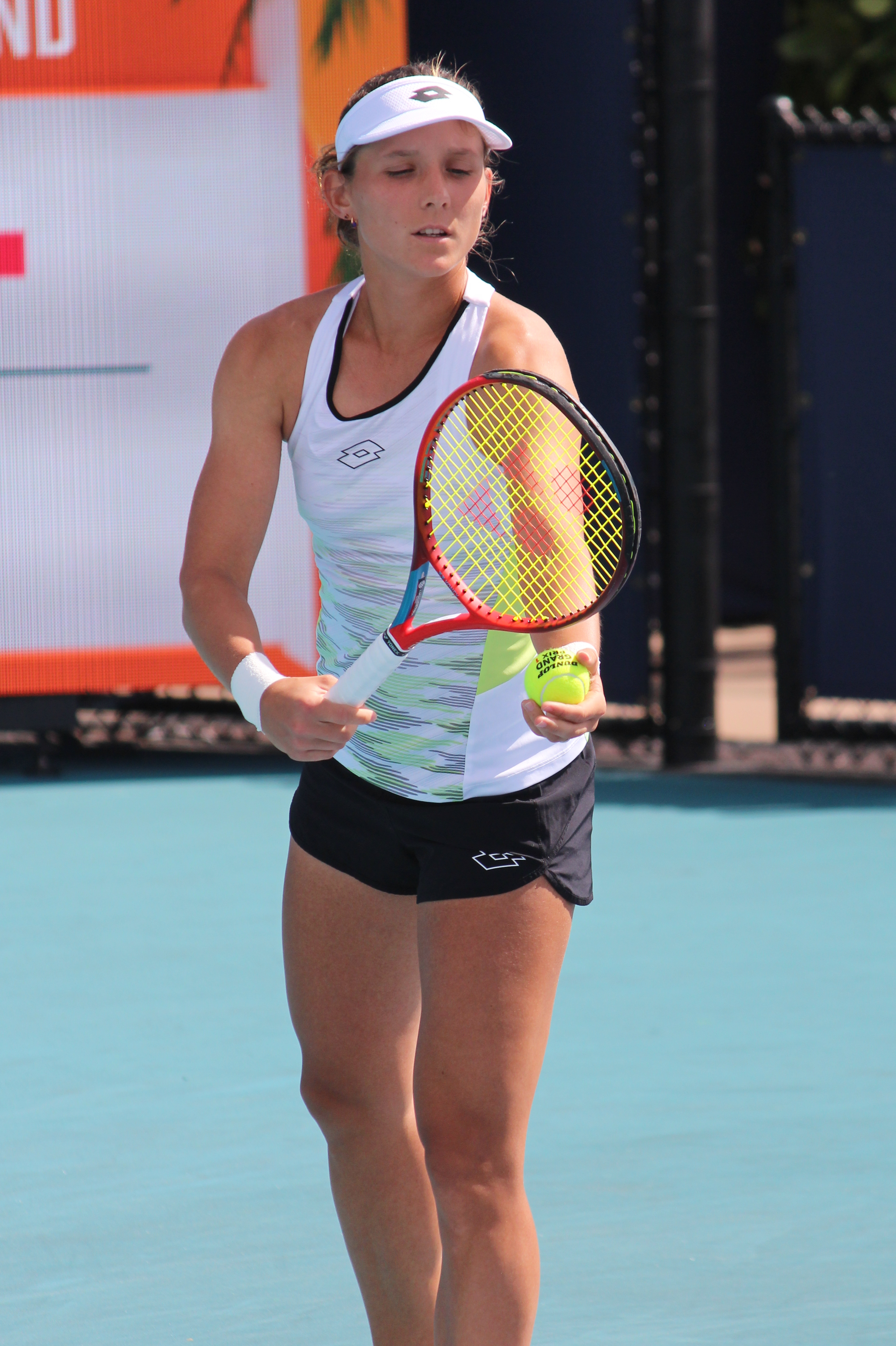
Gracheva at the 2023 Miami Open

She reached the Australian Open third round for the first time in her career by defeating eighth seed Daria Kasatkina, her first top-10 win, and Lucrezia Stefanini.

At the Mérida Open, she reached the round of 16 as a lucky loser defeating Tatjana Maria, before losing to Sloane Stephens. The following week, she reached the quarterfinals of the Texas Open defeating top seed Magda Linette and Anna Blinkova. Next, she defeated American fifth seed Sloane Stephens in the quarterfinals, and Katie Volynets in the semifinals to reach her first WTA Tour final. However, she lost to Ukrainian Marta Kostyuk, in straight sets.

She made her debut in Indian Wells as a qualifier and reached the fourth round for the first time in her career at the WTA 1000-level defeating qualifier Ysaline Bonaventure, 25th seed Petra Martić and again eighth seed compatriot, Daria Kasatkina, her second top-10 win in two months. At the Miami Open, again as a qualifier, she defeated fourth seed Ons Jabeur for her second top-10 win in two weeks and first in the top 5, and lucky loser Magdalena Fręch to reach back-to-back WTA 1000 fourth rounds. As a result, she moved into the top 50 at world No. 46 in the WTA singles rankings on 3 April 2023.

=== 2024: French Open fourth round and Olympic debut ===
Seeded eighth, Gracheva began the season by reaching the quarterfinals of the Auckland Open, defeating qualifiers Tereza Martincová and Lulu Sun before losing to top seed and eventual champion Coco Gauff.

In May, she reached the semifinals of the Trophée Clarins, a WTA 125 tournament in Paris, where she lost to Diana Shnaider. At the French Open, Gracheva reached the fourth round of a major for the first time, defeating sixth seed Maria Sakkari, Bernarda Pera and Irina-Camelia Begu before losing to Mirra Andreeva.

In July, Gracheva made her Olympic debut at the 2024 Summer Olympics in Paris, representing France in both singles and doubles. She lost in the opening round of the singles event to Beatriz Haddad Maia in three sets. In doubles, she partnered Clara Burel, losing their first-round match to Canadian pair Gabriela Dabrowski and Leylah Fernandez.

In October, seeded fourth, Gracheva reached the semifinals of the Hong Kong 125 Open, where she was defeated by sixth seed Clara Tauson. She finished the season ranked world No. 66 in singles.

=== 2025: Eastbourne semifinal and first WTA 1000 quarterfinal ===
Having qualified for the main draw at the Eastbourne Open in June, Gracheva defeated Camila Osorio and eighth seed Rebecca Šramková before advancing to the semifinals following the withdrawal of second seed Barbora Krejčíková due to a thigh injury. She lost in the semifinals to fellow qualifier Alexandra Eala, recording her best career result on grass.

In August, Gracheva qualified for the main draw of the Cincinnati Open and reached her first WTA 1000 quarterfinal. She defeated Katie Volynets, Sofia Kenin, 11th seed Karolína Muchová and fellow qualifier Ella Seidel before losing to Veronika Kudermetova in straight sets. Her performance allowed her to return to the world's top 100 on 18 August 2025.

Later that month, Gracheva reached the final qualifying round of the US Open, where she lost to Ena Shibahara. She finished the season ranked world No. 80.

=== 2026: Knee injury ===
Gracheva reached the second round of the Australian Open, defeating Viktorija Golubic before losing to fifth seed Elena Rybakina. In February, she qualified for the Qatar Open in Doha, where she defeated Laura Siegemund and ninth seed Linda Nosková to reach the fourth round, losing to Maria Sakkari. She reached a season-high singles ranking of world No. 56 on 23 February.

In late March, Gracheva suffered a rupture of the anterior cruciate ligament in her left knee during a training session on clay courts in Bradenton, Florida. The injury forced her to withdraw from France's 2026 Billie Jean King Cup squad and ruled her out of competition for an extended period.

In May, she underwent successful surgery in the United States to repair the injured ligament and began rehabilitation in Austin, Texas. She subsequently missed the French Open, Wimbledon and US Open. By late September, her singles ranking had fallen outside the world's top 150.

== National representation ==
Having lived in France for more than five years, she applied for French naturalization in early March 2023, a request which was accepted two months later. She obtained French nationality that June, and was approved to start representing France, after receiving her passport. Gracheva began that at the 2023 Bad Homburg Open.

== Performance timelines ==
Key
W	F	SF	QF	#R	RR	Q#	DNQ	A	NH

(W) winner; (F) finalist; (SF) semifinalist; (QF) quarterfinalist; (#R) rounds 4, 3, 2, 1; (RR) round-robin stage; (Q#) qualification round; (DNQ) did not qualify; (A) absent; (NH) not held; (SR) strike rate (events won / competed); (W–L) win–loss record.
To avoid confusion and double counting, these charts are updated at the conclusion of a tournament or when the player's participation has ended.

Only main-draw results in WTA Tour, Grand Slam tournaments, Billie Jean King Cup, United Cup, Hopman Cup and Olympic Games are included in win–loss records.

=== Singles ===
Current through the 2026 Miami Open.

Tournament	2019	2020	2021	2022	2023	2024	2025	2026	SR	W–L	Win%
Grand Slam tournaments
Australian Open	A	Q3	2R	1R	3R	2R	2R	2R	0 / 6	6–6	50%
French Open	A	1R	3R	3R	2R	4R	1R	A	0 / 6	8–6	57%
Wimbledon	A	NH	1R	A (Note: Suspended due to the ban of Russian and Belarusian athletes in light of the Russian invasion of Ukraine.)	2R	2R	1R	A	0 / 4	2–4	33%
US Open	Q3	3R	3R	1R	1R	1R	Q3	A	0 / 5	4–5	44%
Win–loss	0–0	2–2	5–4	2–3	4–4	5–4	1–3	1–1	0 / 21	20–21	49%
National representation
Summer Olympics	NH		A	NH		1R	NH		0 / 1	0–1	0%
WTA 1000
Qatar Open (Note: The first Premier 5 event of the year has switched back and forth between the Dubai Tennis Championships and the Qatar Ladies Open since 2009. Dubai was classified as a Premier 5 event from 2009 to 2011 before being succeeded by Doha for the 2012–2014 period. In 2015, Dubai regained its Premier 5 status while Doha was demoted to Premier status. The Premier 5 tournaments were reclassified as WTA 1000 tournaments in 2021.)	NMS	Q1	NMS	A	NMS	1R	Q2	3R	0 / 2	2–2	50%
Dubai	A	NMS	A	NMS	A	1R	A	2R	0 / 2	1–2	33%
Indian Wells Open	A	NH	A	A	4R	1R	2R	1R	0 / 4	4–4	50%
Miami Open	A	NH	Q2	A	4R	1R	1R	1R	0 / 4	3–4	43%
Madrid Open	A	NH	Q1	2R	1R	1R	1R	A	0 / 4	1–4	20%
Italian Open	A	A	A	A	1R	2R	1R	A	0 / 3	1–3	25%
Canadian Open	A	NH	A	A	1R	A	2R	A	0 / 2	1–2	33%
Cincinnati Open	A	Q1	A	Q1	2R	2R	QF	A	0 / 3	5–3	63%
Guadalajara Open	NH			A	A	NMS			0 / 0	0–0	–
Wuhan Open	A	NH				A	Q1		0 / 0	0–0	–
China Open	A	NH			2R	1R	Q1		0 / 2	1–2	33%
Win–loss	0–0	0–0	0–0	1–1	8–7	2–8	2–5		0 / 21	13–21	38%
Career statistics
	2019	2020	2021	2022	2023	2024	2025	2026	SR	W–L	Win%
Tournaments	3	4	21	18	22	25	9		Career total: 93		
Titles	0	0	0	0	0	0	0		Career total: 0		
Finals	0	0	0	0	1	0	0		Career total: 1		
Hard win–loss	2–2	3–2	12–13	4–7	17–14	11–16	3–6		0 / 44	41–44	48%
Clay win–loss	0–1	0–2	2–6	4–11	4–5	6–7	2–3		0 / 35	18–35	34%
Grass win–loss	0–0	0–0	0–2	0–0	3–3	1–2			0 / 7	4–7	36%
Overall win–loss	2–3	3–4	14–21	8–18	24–22	18–25	5–9		0 / 68	51–68	43%
Year-end ranking (Note: 2017: WTA ranking–882, 2018: WTA ranking–447.)	105	93	79	95	44	66	80		$2,675,201		

=== Doubles ===
Current through the 2023 Washington Open.

Tournament	2020	2021	2022	2023	SR	W–L	Win%
Grand Slam tournaments
Australian Open	A	A	1R	A	0 / 1	0–1	0%
French Open	2R	2R	1R	1R	0 / 4	2–4	33%
Wimbledon	NH	3R	A	1R	0 / 2	2–2	50%
US Open	A	2R	1R	1R	0 / 3	1–3	25%
Win–loss	1–1	4–3	0–3	0–3	0 / 10	5–10	33%
Career statistics
Tournaments	2	8	5	5	Career total: 20		
Overall win–loss	1–2	6–8	1–5	0–5	0 / 20	8–20	29%
Year-end ranking (Note: 2018: WTA ranking–1233, 2019: WTA ranking–n/a.)	481	149	554	903			

== WTA Tour finals ==
=== Singles: 1 (runner-up) ===
Legend WTA 250 (0–1)	Finals by surface Hard (0–1)

Result	W–L	Date	Tournament	Tier	Surface	Opponent	Score
Loss	0–1	Mar 2023	ATX Open, United States	WTA 250	Hard	(Ukraine) Marta Kostyuk	3–6, 5–7

== ITF Circuit finals ==
=== Singles: 9 (7 titles, 2 runner-ups) ===
Legend
$60,000 tournaments (2–0)
$25,000 tournaments (3–0)
$15,000 tournaments (2–2)

Result	W–L	Date	Tournament	Tier	Surface	Opponent	Score
Loss	0–1	Sep 2017	ITF Hammamet, Tunisia	15,000	Clay	(Algeria) Inès Ibbou	6–3, 6–7^{(4)}, 0–6
Loss	0–2	Nov 2017	ITF Hammamet, Tunisia	15,000	Clay	(Italy) Gaia Sanesi	3–6, 4–6
Win	1–2	Nov 2017	ITF Hammamet, Tunisia	15,000	Clay	(France) Fiona Ferro	6–4, 7–6^{(1)}
Win	2–2	Jan 2018	ITF Antalya, Turkey	15,000	Clay	(Georgia (country)) Sofia Shapatava	7–5, 6–0
Win	3–2	Apr 2019	Chiasso Open, Switzerland	25,000	Clay	(Romania) Jaqueline Cristian	6–4, 6–2
Win	4–2	May 2019	ITF Caserta, Italy	25,000	Clay	(Kazakhstan) Anna Danilina	6–3, 7–5
Win	5–2	Jun 2019	Open de Montpellier, France	25,000+H	Clay	(United States) Elizabeth Halbauer	6–4, 6–2
Win	6–2	Sep 2019	Open de Saint-Malo, France	60,000+H	Clay	(Ukraine) Marta Kostyuk	6–3, 6–2
Win	7–2	Sep 2019	Open de Valencia, Spain	60,000+H	Clay	(Germany) Tamara Korpatsch	3–6, 6–2, 6–0

== Head-to-head records ==
=== Wins against top-10 players ===
- Gracheva has a 3–7 record against players who were, at the time the match was played, ranked in the top 10.

#	Opponent	Rk	Event	Surface	Rd	Score	Rk	Ref
2023
1.	Daria Kasatkina	8	Australian Open	Hard	1R	6–1, 6–1	97	
2.	Daria Kasatkina	8	Indian Wells Open, US	Hard	3R	6–4, 6–4	66	
3.	(Tunisia) Ons Jabeur	5	Miami Open, US	Hard	2R	6–2, 6–2	54	
2024
4.	(Greece) Maria Sakkari	7	French Open, France	Clay	1R	3–6, 6–4, 6–3	88	

- Key: (Rk) first use, opponent rank; (Rd) round; (Rk) 2nd use, player rank; (Ref) reference; (F) final; (SF) semifinal; (QF) quarterfinal; (#R) rounds 4, 3, 2, 1; (RR) round-robin stage; (Q#) qualifying rounds or stages (3), 2, 1.
