= 2018 ITF Women's Circuit (April–June) =

The 2018 ITF Women's Circuit is the 2018 edition of the second-tier tour for women's professional tennis. It is organised by the International Tennis Federation and is a tier below the WTA Tour. The ITF Women's Circuit includes tournaments with prize money ranging from $15,000 up to $100,000.

== Key ==
Category
$100,000 tournaments
$80,000 tournaments
$60,000 tournaments
$25,000 tournaments
$15,000 tournaments

== Month ==
=== April ===
Week of	Tournament	Winner	Runners-up	Semifinalists	Quarterfinalists
April 2	Pula, Italy; Clay $25,000; Singles and doubles draws	(Slovenia) Tamara Zidanšek; 6–3, 6–1	(Italy) Anastasia Grymalska	(Czech Republic) Anastasia Zarycká (Slovakia) Michaela Hončová	(Germany) Katharina Hobgarski (Russia) Veronika Kudermetova (Netherlands) Quirine Lemoine (Slovakia) Chantal Škamlová
April 2	Pula, Italy; Clay $25,000; Singles and doubles draws	(Russia) Valeriya Solovyeva (Germany) Anna Zaja; 7–5, 6–3	(France) Manon Arcangioli (Slovakia) Chantal Škamlová	(Czech Republic) Anastasia Zarycká (Slovakia) Michaela Hončová	(Germany) Katharina Hobgarski (Russia) Veronika Kudermetova (Netherlands) Quirine Lemoine (Slovakia) Chantal Škamlová
April 2	Kashiwa, Japan; Hard $25,000; Singles and doubles draws	(Thailand) Luksika Kumkhum; 6–3, 7–6^{(7–4)}	(Canada) Bianca Andreescu	(Australia) Destanee Aiava (China) Zheng Saisai	(Japan) Mayo Hibi (China) Zhu Lin (South Korea) Jang Su-jeong (India) Ankita Raina
April 2	Kashiwa, Japan; Hard $25,000; Singles and doubles draws	(Japan) Kyōka Okamura (Japan) Ayaka Okuno; 6–2, 6–2	(South Korea) Han Na-lae (Japan) Robu Kajitani	(Australia) Destanee Aiava (China) Zheng Saisai	(Japan) Mayo Hibi (China) Zhu Lin (South Korea) Jang Su-jeong (India) Ankita Raina
April 2	Jackson, United States; Clay $25,000; Singles and doubles draws	(Ukraine) Anhelina Kalinina; 6–0, 6–1	(Italy) Gaia Sanesi	(United States) Katerina Stewart (United States) Whitney Osuigwe	(Germany) Sarah-Rebecca Sekulic (Belgium) Tamaryn Hendler (Chinese Taipei) Hsu Chieh-yu (Austria) Barbara Haas
April 2	Jackson, United States; Clay $25,000; Singles and doubles draws	(United States) Sanaz Marand (United States) Whitney Osuigwe; 6–1, 6–3	(Italy) Gaia Sanesi (South Africa) Chanel Simmonds	(United States) Katerina Stewart (United States) Whitney Osuigwe	(Germany) Sarah-Rebecca Sekulic (Belgium) Tamaryn Hendler (Chinese Taipei) Hsu Chieh-yu (Austria) Barbara Haas
April 2	Nanjing, China; Hard $15,000; Singles and doubles draws	(China) Gai Ao; 3–6, 6–4, 6–0	(China) You Xiaodi	(China) Ye Qiuyu (China) Cao Siqi	(United States) Amy Zhu (Indonesia) Aldila Sutjiadi (China) Feng Shuo (United Kingdom) Emma Raducanu
April 2	Nanjing, China; Hard $15,000; Singles and doubles draws	(China) Chen Jiahui (China) Zheng Wushuang; 7–6^{(7–2)}, 6–1	(China) Sun Xuliu (China) Zhao Qianqian	(China) Ye Qiuyu (China) Cao Siqi	(United States) Amy Zhu (Indonesia) Aldila Sutjiadi (China) Feng Shuo (United Kingdom) Emma Raducanu
April 2	Sharm El Sheikh, Egypt; Hard $15,000; Singles and doubles draws	(United Kingdom) Tara Moore; 6–0, 6–1	(Greece) Eleni Kordolaimi	(Bulgaria) Julia Terziyska (Russia) Angelina Gabueva	(India) Zeel Desai (Georgia (country)) Mariam Bolkvadze (Belgium) Britt Geukens (Belgium) Greet Minnen
April 2	Sharm El Sheikh, Egypt; Hard $15,000; Singles and doubles draws	(Belarus) Iryna Shymanovich (Bulgaria) Julia Terziyska; 6–3, 7–5	(Chinese Taipei) Chen Pei-hsuan (Chinese Taipei) Wu Fang-hsien	(Bulgaria) Julia Terziyska (Russia) Angelina Gabueva	(India) Zeel Desai (Georgia (country)) Mariam Bolkvadze (Belgium) Britt Geukens (Belgium) Greet Minnen
April 2	Hammamet, Tunisia; Clay $15,000; Singles and doubles draws	(Paraguay) Montserrat González; 2–6, 6–2, 6–2	(Croatia) Lea Bošković	(Sweden) Mirjam Björklund (Italy) Lucrezia Stefanini	(Australia) Seone Mendez (Ukraine) Maryna Chernyshova (Bulgaria) Isabella Shinikova (Egypt) Sandra Samir
April 2	Hammamet, Tunisia; Clay $15,000; Singles and doubles draws	(Hungary) Vanda Lukács (Germany) Natalia Siedliska; 6–4, 7–5	(Paraguay) Montserrat González (United States) Jessica Ho	(Sweden) Mirjam Björklund (Italy) Lucrezia Stefanini	(Australia) Seone Mendez (Ukraine) Maryna Chernyshova (Bulgaria) Isabella Shinikova (Egypt) Sandra Samir
April 2	Antalya, Turkey; Clay $15,000; Singles and doubles draws	(Russia) Varvara Flink; 6–4, 6–4	(Slovenia) Nina Potočnik	(Bulgaria) Petia Arshinkova (Belgium) Eliessa Vanlangendonck	(Romania) Arina Gabriela Vasilescu (Russia) Ekaterina Vishnevskaya (Russia) Anastasia Gasanova (Bosnia and Herzegovina) Dea Herdželaš
April 2	Antalya, Turkey; Clay $15,000; Singles and doubles draws	(Germany) Lisa-Marie Mätschke (Germany) Syna Schreiber; 6–3, 6–1	(Bulgaria) Petia Arshinkova (Bulgaria) Gebriela Mihaylova	(Bulgaria) Petia Arshinkova (Belgium) Eliessa Vanlangendonck	(Romania) Arina Gabriela Vasilescu (Russia) Ekaterina Vishnevskaya (Russia) Anastasia Gasanova (Bosnia and Herzegovina) Dea Herdželaš
April 9	Lale Cup; Istanbul, Turkey; Hard $60,000; Singles – Doubles	(Uzbekistan) Sabina Sharipova; 7–6^{(7–0)}, 6–4	(Russia) Elena Rybakina	(Russia) Olga Doroshina (Slovakia) Viktória Kužmová	(Serbia) Olga Danilović (Serbia) Natalija Kostić (Czech Republic) Tereza Smitková (Russia) Anastasia Potapova
April 9	Lale Cup; Istanbul, Turkey; Hard $60,000; Singles – Doubles	(Turkey) Ayla Aksu (United Kingdom) Harriet Dart; 6–4, 7–6^{(7–3)}	(Russia) Olga Doroshina (Russia) Anastasia Potapova	(Russia) Olga Doroshina (Slovakia) Viktória Kužmová	(Serbia) Olga Danilović (Serbia) Natalija Kostić (Czech Republic) Tereza Smitková (Russia) Anastasia Potapova
April 9	Space Coast Pro Tennis Classic; Indian Harbour Beach, United States; Clay $60,000; Singles – Doubles	(United States) Caroline Dolehide; 6–4, 7–5	(Romania) Irina Bara	(United States) Madison Brengle (United States) Taylor Townsend	(United States) Sophie Chang (Slovakia) Jana Čepelová (Canada) Françoise Abanda (Tunisia) Ons Jabeur
April 9	Space Coast Pro Tennis Classic; Indian Harbour Beach, United States; Clay $60,000; Singles – Doubles	(Romania) Irina Bara (Spain) Sílvia Soler Espinosa; 6–4, 6–2	(United States) Jessica Pegula (United States) Maria Sanchez	(United States) Madison Brengle (United States) Taylor Townsend	(United States) Sophie Chang (Slovakia) Jana Čepelová (Canada) Françoise Abanda (Tunisia) Ons Jabeur
April 9	Pula, Italy; Clay $25,000; Singles and doubles draws	(Slovenia) Tamara Zidanšek; 6–1, 7–6^{(7–4)}	(France) Myrtille Georges	(Russia) Polina Leykina (Netherlands) Bibiane Schoofs	(Argentina) Catalina Pella (Ukraine) Anastasiya Vasylyeva (Croatia) Tena Lukas (Romania) Cristina Dinu
April 9	Pula, Italy; Clay $25,000; Singles and doubles draws	(Netherlands) Bibiane Schoofs (Slovakia) Chantal Škamlová; 6–2, 3–6, [10–7]	(United States) Chiara Scholl (Bosnia and Herzegovina) Jelena Simić	(Russia) Polina Leykina (Netherlands) Bibiane Schoofs	(Argentina) Catalina Pella (Ukraine) Anastasiya Vasylyeva (Croatia) Tena Lukas (Romania) Cristina Dinu
April 9	Osaka, Japan; Hard $25,000; Singles and doubles draws	(Australia) Destanee Aiava; 6–3, 7–6^{(7–2)}	(Canada) Rebecca Marino	(Japan) Shiho Akita (South Korea) Han Na-lae	(Japan) Kurumi Nara (Japan) Junri Namigata (Russia) Ksenia Lykina (China) Wang Xinyu
April 9	Osaka, Japan; Hard $25,000; Singles and doubles draws	(South Korea) Choi Ji-hee (Thailand) Nicha Lertpitaksinchai; 6–3, 6–4	(Japan) Akiko Omae (Thailand) Peangtarn Plipuech	(Japan) Shiho Akita (South Korea) Han Na-lae	(Japan) Kurumi Nara (Japan) Junri Namigata (Russia) Ksenia Lykina (China) Wang Xinyu
April 9	Óbidos, Portugal; Carpet $25,000; Singles and doubles draws	(Serbia) Ivana Jorović; 6–1, 6–2	(Czech Republic) Miriam Kolodziejová	(Australia) Arina Rodionova (Russia) Anastasia Kulikova	(Italy) Stefania Rubini (Italy) Giulia Gatto-Monticone (Russia) Valeria Savinykh (United Kingdom) Katie Boulter
April 9	Óbidos, Portugal; Carpet $25,000; Singles and doubles draws	(United Kingdom) Sarah Beth Grey (United Kingdom) Olivia Nicholls; 4–6, 7–6^{(7–4)}, [10–6]	(Belgium) An-Sophie Mestach (Serbia) Nina Stojanović	(Australia) Arina Rodionova (Russia) Anastasia Kulikova	(Italy) Stefania Rubini (Italy) Giulia Gatto-Monticone (Russia) Valeria Savinykh (United Kingdom) Katie Boulter
April 9	Nana Trophy; Tunis, Tunisia; Clay $25,000; Singles and doubles draws	(Russia) Valentyna Ivakhnenko; 6–2, 6–2	(France) Chloé Paquet	(Italy) Anastasia Grymalska (France) Margot Yerolymos	(France) Alizé Lim (France) Shérazad Reix (France) Manon Arcangioli (France) Tessah Andrianjafitrimo
April 9	Nana Trophy; Tunis, Tunisia; Clay $25,000; Singles and doubles draws	(Ukraine) Maryna Chernyshova (Australia) Seone Mendez; 7–6^{(7–5)}, 6–4	(Russia) Amina Anshba (Italy) Anastasia Grymalska	(Italy) Anastasia Grymalska (France) Margot Yerolymos	(France) Alizé Lim (France) Shérazad Reix (France) Manon Arcangioli (France) Tessah Andrianjafitrimo
April 9	Pelham, United States; Clay $25,000; Singles and doubles draws	(Poland) Iga Świątek; 6–2, 6–0	(United States) Allie Kiick	(Chile) Alexa Guarachi (Spain) Aliona Bolsova Zadoinov	(United States) Maria Mateas (United States) Ashley Kratzer (Belgium) Tamaryn Hendler (Austria) Barbara Haas
April 9	Pelham, United States; Clay $25,000; Singles and doubles draws	(Chile) Alexa Guarachi (New Zealand) Erin Routliffe; 6–1, 6–2	(United States) Maria Mateas (Mexico) María José Portillo Ramírez	(Chile) Alexa Guarachi (Spain) Aliona Bolsova Zadoinov	(United States) Maria Mateas (United States) Ashley Kratzer (Belgium) Tamaryn Hendler (Austria) Barbara Haas
April 9	Sharm El Sheikh, Egypt; Hard $15,000; Singles and doubles draws	(Bulgaria) Julia Terziyska; 6–2, 4–6, 6–4	(United Kingdom) Tara Moore	(Georgia (country)) Mariam Bolkvadze (Greece) Eleni Kordolaimi	(Belarus) Iryna Shymanovich (United States) Shelby Talcott (India) Rutuja Bhosale (Germany) Caroline Werner
April 9	Sharm El Sheikh, Egypt; Hard $15,000; Singles and doubles draws	(Greece) Eleni Kordolaimi (United Kingdom) Tara Moore; 6–4, 6–1	(India) Rutuja Bhosale (India) Kanika Vaidya	(Georgia (country)) Mariam Bolkvadze (Greece) Eleni Kordolaimi	(Belarus) Iryna Shymanovich (United States) Shelby Talcott (India) Rutuja Bhosale (Germany) Caroline Werner
April 9	Shymkent, Kazakhstan; Clay $15,000; Singles and doubles draws	(Russia) Varvara Flink; 6–0, 2–6, 6–0	(Kazakhstan) Gozal Ainitdinova	(Uzbekistan) Nigina Abduraimova (China) Ma Yexin	(Belarus) Anna Kubareva (Russia) Ekaterina Vishnevskaya (Kazakhstan) Dariya Detkovskaya (Slovakia) Viktória Morvayová
April 9	Shymkent, Kazakhstan; Clay $15,000; Singles and doubles draws	(Russia) Daria Kruzhkova (Russia) Valeriya Pogrebnyak; 6–3, 5–7, [10–5]	(India) Kyra Shroff (India) Pranjala Yadlapalli	(Uzbekistan) Nigina Abduraimova (China) Ma Yexin	(Belarus) Anna Kubareva (Russia) Ekaterina Vishnevskaya (Kazakhstan) Dariya Detkovskaya (Slovakia) Viktória Morvayová
April 16	Hardee's Pro Classic; Dothan, United States; Clay $80,000; Singles – Doubles	(United States) Taylor Townsend; 6–2, 2–6, 6–1	(Colombia) Mariana Duque Mariño	(Bulgaria) Sesil Karatantcheva (United States) Francesca Di Lorenzo	(Australia) Lizette Cabrera (Spain) Sílvia Soler Espinosa (Austria) Barbara Haas (United States) Sofia Kenin
April 16	Hardee's Pro Classic; Dothan, United States; Clay $80,000; Singles – Doubles	(Chile) Alexa Guarachi (New Zealand) Erin Routliffe; 6–4, 2–6, [11–9]	(United States) Sofia Kenin (United States) Jamie Loeb	(Bulgaria) Sesil Karatantcheva (United States) Francesca Di Lorenzo	(Australia) Lizette Cabrera (Spain) Sílvia Soler Espinosa (Austria) Barbara Haas (United States) Sofia Kenin
April 16	Pula, Italy; Clay $25,000; Singles and doubles draws	(France) Manon Arcangioli; 2–6, 6–2, 6–4	(Italy) Martina Trevisan	(Croatia) Tereza Mrdeža (Mexico) Renata Zarazúa	(Czech Republic) Anastasia Zarycká (Australia) Ellen Perez (China) Xu Shilin (Argentina) Catalina Pella
April 16	Pula, Italy; Clay $25,000; Singles and doubles draws	(Australia) Naiktha Bains (United States) Chiara Scholl; 6–4, 7–5	(Belgium) Marie Benoît (China) Xu Shilin	(Croatia) Tereza Mrdeža (Mexico) Renata Zarazúa	(Czech Republic) Anastasia Zarycká (Australia) Ellen Perez (China) Xu Shilin (Argentina) Catalina Pella
April 16	Óbidos, Portugal; Carpet $25,000; Singles and doubles draws	(United Kingdom) Katie Boulter; 4–6, 6–3, 6–3	(Poland) Urszula Radwańska	(United Kingdom) Katie Swan (Italy) Giulia Gatto-Monticone	(Serbia) Ivana Jorović (Spain) Olga Sáez Larra (Spain) Estrella Cabeza Candela (Turkey) Pemra Özgen
April 16	Óbidos, Portugal; Carpet $25,000; Singles and doubles draws	(United Kingdom) Sarah Beth Grey (United Kingdom) Olivia Nicholls; 6–2, 6–1	(France) Jessika Ponchet (Ukraine) Ganna Poznikhirenko	(United Kingdom) Katie Swan (Italy) Giulia Gatto-Monticone	(Serbia) Ivana Jorović (Spain) Olga Sáez Larra (Spain) Estrella Cabeza Candela (Turkey) Pemra Özgen
April 16	Chiasso, Switzerland; Clay $25,000; Singles and doubles draws	(Netherlands) Cindy Burger; 6–7^{(4–7)}, 6–4, 6–3	(Romania) Raluca Georgiana Șerban	(Romania) Andreea Amalia Roșca (Ukraine) Katarina Zavatska	(Belgium) Maryna Zanevska (Italy) Anastasia Grymalska (Hungary) Dalma Gálfi (Switzerland) Ylena In-Albon
April 16	Chiasso, Switzerland; Clay $25,000; Singles and doubles draws	(Croatia) Darija Jurak (Australia) Jessica Moore; 7–6^{(8–6)}, 4–6, [10–8]	(Netherlands) Cindy Burger (Netherlands) Rosalie van der Hoek	(Romania) Andreea Amalia Roșca (Ukraine) Katarina Zavatska	(Belgium) Maryna Zanevska (Italy) Anastasia Grymalska (Hungary) Dalma Gálfi (Switzerland) Ylena In-Albon
April 16	Villa Dolores, Argentina; Clay $15,000; Singles and doubles draws	(United Kingdom) Francesca Jones; 4–6, 6–4, 6–2	(Argentina) Victoria Bosio	(Brazil) Thaisa Grana Pedretti (Brazil) Alice Garcia	(Chile) Fernanda Brito (Chile) Ivania Martinich (Brazil) Carolina Alves (Brazil) Nathaly Kurata
April 16	Villa Dolores, Argentina; Clay $15,000; Singles and doubles draws	(Chile) Bárbara Gatica (Brazil) Rebeca Pereira; 6–2, 6–4	(Argentina) Victoria Bosio (Argentina) Julieta Lara Estable	(Brazil) Thaisa Grana Pedretti (Brazil) Alice Garcia	(Chile) Fernanda Brito (Chile) Ivania Martinich (Brazil) Carolina Alves (Brazil) Nathaly Kurata
April 16	Sharm El Sheikh, Egypt; Hard $15,000; Singles and doubles draws	(Belarus) Iryna Shymanovich; 6–2, 6–1	(United States) Dasha Ivanova	(India) Sai Samhitha Chamarthi (Belarus) Shalimar Talbi	(Ukraine) Yuliya Lysa (Bulgaria) Julia Terziyska (United Kingdom) Alicia Barnett (Romania) Irina Fetecău
April 16	Sharm El Sheikh, Egypt; Hard $15,000; Singles and doubles draws	(Austria) Melanie Klaffner (Russia) Anna Morgina; 7–5, 6–1	(United Kingdom) Alicia Barnett (Bulgaria) Julia Terziyska	(India) Sai Samhitha Chamarthi (Belarus) Shalimar Talbi	(Ukraine) Yuliya Lysa (Bulgaria) Julia Terziyska (United Kingdom) Alicia Barnett (Romania) Irina Fetecău
April 16	Shymkent, Kazakhstan; Clay $15,000; Singles and doubles draws	(Russia) Varvara Flink; 6–0, 6–3	(Russia) Polina Golubovskaya	(Belarus) Vlada Zvereva (India) Pranjala Yadlapalli	(Russia) Ekaterina Makarova (China) Ma Yexin (Czech Republic) Anna Sisková (Moldova) Vitalia Stamat
April 16	Shymkent, Kazakhstan; Clay $15,000; Singles and doubles draws	(Kazakhstan) Dariya Detkovskaya (Kazakhstan) Zhibek Kulambayeva; 7–5, 6–4	(Russia) Polina Bakhmutkina (Russia) Daria Lodikova	(Belarus) Vlada Zvereva (India) Pranjala Yadlapalli	(Russia) Ekaterina Makarova (China) Ma Yexin (Czech Republic) Anna Sisková (Moldova) Vitalia Stamat
April 16	Hammamet, Tunisia; Clay $15,000; Singles and doubles draws	(France) Margot Yerolymos; 6–1, 6–2	(Russia) Amina Anshba	(France) Émeline Dartron (United States) Jessica Ho	(Slovenia) Pia Čuk (France) Alice Ramé (Romania) Andreea Ghițescu (Romania) Oana Gavrilă
April 16	Hammamet, Tunisia; Clay $15,000; Singles and doubles draws	(Russia) Amina Anshba (Russia) Maria Marfutina; 4–6, 6–2, [12–10]	(Ukraine) Maryna Chernyshova (Romania) Oana Gavrilă	(France) Émeline Dartron (United States) Jessica Ho	(Slovenia) Pia Čuk (France) Alice Ramé (Romania) Andreea Ghițescu (Romania) Oana Gavrilă
April 16	Antalya, Turkey; Clay $15,000; Singles and doubles draws	(Russia) Alexandra Panova; 6–2, 7–6^{(7–3)}	(Russia) Anastasia Pribylova	(Russia) Anna Pribylova (Italy) Federica Bilardo	(Turkey) İpek Soylu (Czech Republic) Magdaléna Pantůčková (Czech Republic) Johana Marková (Italy) Verena Meliss
April 16	Antalya, Turkey; Clay $15,000; Singles and doubles draws	(Japan) Haruna Arakawa (Italy) Federica Bilardo; 4–6, 6–4, [10–8]	(Russia) Kamilla Rakhimova (Czech Republic) Kateřina Vaňková	(Russia) Anna Pribylova (Italy) Federica Bilardo	(Turkey) İpek Soylu (Czech Republic) Magdaléna Pantůčková (Czech Republic) Johana Marková (Italy) Verena Meliss
April 23	Boyd Tinsley Clay Court Classic; Charlottesville, United States; Clay $80,000; Singles – Doubles	(Colombia) Mariana Duque Mariño; 0–6, 6–1, 6–2	(Ukraine) Anhelina Kalinina	(United States) Taylor Townsend (United States) Jennifer Brady	(Japan) Mari Osaka (Bulgaria) Sesil Karatantcheva (United States) Grace Min (United States) Katerina Stewart
April 23	Boyd Tinsley Clay Court Classic; Charlottesville, United States; Clay $80,000; Singles – Doubles	(United States) Sophie Chang (United States) Alexandra Mueller; 3–6, 6–4, [10–7]	(United States) Ashley Kratzer (United States) Whitney Osuigwe	(United States) Taylor Townsend (United States) Jennifer Brady	(Japan) Mari Osaka (Bulgaria) Sesil Karatantcheva (United States) Grace Min (United States) Katerina Stewart
April 23	Industrial Bank Cup; Quanzhou, China; Hard $60,000; Singles – Doubles	(China) Zheng Saisai; 6–3, 6–1	(China) Liu Fangzhou	(Thailand) Luksika Kumkhum (United Kingdom) Naomi Broady	(China) Lu Jiajing (United States) Danielle Lao (Belgium) Yanina Wickmayer (China) Han Xinyun
April 23	Industrial Bank Cup; Quanzhou, China; Hard $60,000; Singles – Doubles	(China) Han Xinyun (China) Ye Qiuyu; 7–6^{(7–3)}, 7–6^{(8–6)}	(China) Guo Hanyu (China) Wang Xinyu	(Thailand) Luksika Kumkhum (United Kingdom) Naomi Broady	(China) Lu Jiajing (United States) Danielle Lao (Belgium) Yanina Wickmayer (China) Han Xinyun
April 23	Wiesbaden, Germany; Clay $25,000; Singles and doubles draws	(Liechtenstein) Kathinka von Deichmann; 6–3, 6–2	(Ukraine) Katarina Zavatska	(France) Priscilla Heise (Spain) Olga Sáez Larra	(Belgium) Kimberley Zimmermann (Sweden) Cornelia Lister (Bulgaria) Isabella Shinikova (Serbia) Dejana Radanović
April 23	Wiesbaden, Germany; Clay $25,000; Singles and doubles draws	(Belgium) Hélène Scholsen (South Africa) Chanel Simmonds; 6–3, 2–6, [10–8]	(Sweden) Cornelia Lister (United States) Sabrina Santamaria	(France) Priscilla Heise (Spain) Olga Sáez Larra	(Belgium) Kimberley Zimmermann (Sweden) Cornelia Lister (Bulgaria) Isabella Shinikova (Serbia) Dejana Radanović
April 23	Pula, Italy; Clay $25,000; Singles and doubles draws	(Australia) Jaimee Fourlis; 6–4, 4–6, 6–0	(Italy) Anastasia Grymalska	(Italy) Martina Di Giuseppe (Argentina) Catalina Pella	(Italy) Georgia Brescia (Slovenia) Nina Potočnik (Switzerland) Ylena In-Albon (Italy) Ludmilla Samsonova
April 23	Pula, Italy; Clay $25,000; Singles and doubles draws	(Australia) Naiktha Bains (Netherlands) Rosalie van der Hoek; 6–2, 6–2	(Russia) Victoria Kan (Russia) Maria Zotova	(Italy) Martina Di Giuseppe (Argentina) Catalina Pella	(Italy) Georgia Brescia (Slovenia) Nina Potočnik (Switzerland) Ylena In-Albon (Italy) Ludmilla Samsonova
April 23	Óbidos, Portugal; Carpet $25,000; Singles and doubles draws	(Australia) Arina Rodionova; 6–3, 6–2	(Turkey) Pemra Özgen	(Poland) Urszula Radwańska (United Kingdom) Katie Swan	(Spain) Estrella Cabeza Candela (Turkey) Berfu Cengiz (United Kingdom) Sarah Beth Grey (Ukraine) Ganna Poznikhirenko
April 23	Óbidos, Portugal; Carpet $25,000; Singles and doubles draws	(Spain) Estrella Cabeza Candela (Spain) Ángela Fita Boluda; 7–6^{(7–3)}, 1–6, [10–6]	(United Kingdom) Freya Christie (Belgium) An-Sophie Mestach	(Poland) Urszula Radwańska (United Kingdom) Katie Swan	(Spain) Estrella Cabeza Candela (Turkey) Berfu Cengiz (United Kingdom) Sarah Beth Grey (Ukraine) Ganna Poznikhirenko
April 23	Qarshi, Uzbekistan; Hard $25,000; Singles and doubles draws	(Russia) Olga Doroshina; 6–2, 7–5	(Russia) Anastasia Gasanova	(India) Rutuja Bhosale (Russia) Margarita Gasparyan	(Russia) Ekaterina Yashina (Russia) Sofya Lansere (Ukraine) Valeriya Strakhova (Uzbekistan) Akgul Amanmuradova
April 23	Qarshi, Uzbekistan; Hard $25,000; Singles and doubles draws	(Uzbekistan) Nigina Abduraimova (Russia) Anastasia Frolova; 7–6^{(9–7)}, 6–1	(Russia) Anastasia Gasanova (Russia) Ekaterina Yashina	(India) Rutuja Bhosale (Russia) Margarita Gasparyan	(Russia) Ekaterina Yashina (Russia) Sofya Lansere (Ukraine) Valeriya Strakhova (Uzbekistan) Akgul Amanmuradova
April 23	Villa del Dique, Argentina; Clay $15,000; Singles and doubles draws	(Brazil) Thaisa Grana Pedretti; 6–0, 6–4	(Chile) Fernanda Brito	(Brazil) Carolina Alves (Chile) Bárbara Gatica	(Argentina) Victoria Bosio (United Kingdom) Francesca Jones (France) Caroline Roméo (Argentina) Carla Lucero
April 23	Villa del Dique, Argentina; Clay $15,000; Singles and doubles draws	(Brazil) Nathaly Kurata (Brazil) Eduarda Piai; 6–0, 6–4	(Chile) Fernanda Brito (Peru) Dominique Schaefer	(Brazil) Carolina Alves (Chile) Bárbara Gatica	(Argentina) Victoria Bosio (United Kingdom) Francesca Jones (France) Caroline Roméo (Argentina) Carla Lucero
April 23	Tučepi, Croatia; Clay $15,000; Singles and doubles draws	(Croatia) Lea Bošković; 1–6, 6–0, 6–4	(Croatia) Tena Lukas	(Croatia) Ani Mijačika (Bosnia and Herzegovina) Nefisa Berberović	(Czech Republic) Gabriela Pantůčková (Slovenia) Nika Radišič (Switzerland) Lara Michel (Croatia) Noa Krznarić
April 23	Tučepi, Croatia; Clay $15,000; Singles and doubles draws	(Bosnia and Herzegovina) Nefisa Berberović (Slovenia) Veronika Erjavec; 6–3, 6–3	(Croatia) Tena Lukas (Estonia) Saara Orav	(Croatia) Ani Mijačika (Bosnia and Herzegovina) Nefisa Berberović	(Czech Republic) Gabriela Pantůčková (Slovenia) Nika Radišič (Switzerland) Lara Michel (Croatia) Noa Krznarić
April 23	Cairo, Egypt; Clay $15,000; Singles and doubles draws	(Romania) Irina Fetecău; 6–1, 6–1	(Ecuador) Charlotte Römer	(Netherlands) Dominique Karregat (India) Snehadevi Reddy	(United States) Shelby Talcott (Argentina) Melany Solange Krywoj (Serbia) Bojana Marinković (Japan) Minami Akiyama
April 23	Cairo, Egypt; Clay $15,000; Singles and doubles draws	(Netherlands) Dominique Karregat (Spain) Nuria Párrizas Díaz; 6–2, 6–4	(United States) Madeleine Kobelt (United States) Shelby Talcott	(Netherlands) Dominique Karregat (India) Snehadevi Reddy	(United States) Shelby Talcott (Argentina) Melany Solange Krywoj (Serbia) Bojana Marinković (Japan) Minami Akiyama
April 23	Hammamet, Tunisia; Clay $15,000; Singles and doubles draws	(Romania) Ioana Loredana Roșca; 3–6, 6–3, 7–5	(Russia) Maria Marfutina	(France) Clara Burel (Spain) Claudia Hoste Ferrer	(Spain) Lucía Marzal Martínez (Switzerland) Nina Stadler (Italy) Michele Alexandra Zmău (Romania) Oana Gavrilă
April 23	Hammamet, Tunisia; Clay $15,000; Singles and doubles draws	(Romania) Oana Gavrilă (Russia) Maria Marfutina; 6–2, 6–2	(Japan) Mana Ayukawa (Switzerland) Nina Stadler	(France) Clara Burel (Spain) Claudia Hoste Ferrer	(Spain) Lucía Marzal Martínez (Switzerland) Nina Stadler (Italy) Michele Alexandra Zmău (Romania) Oana Gavrilă
April 23	Antalya, Turkey; Clay $15,000; Singles and doubles draws	(United States) Elizabeth Halbauer; 6–4, 6–2	(Romania) Oana Georgeta Simion	(Japan) Haruna Arakawa (Russia) Anastasia Pribylova	(Bulgaria) Julia Stamatova (Paraguay) Camila Giangreco Campiz (Bulgaria) Dia Evtimova (Czech Republic) Magdaléna Pantůčková
April 23	Antalya, Turkey; Clay $15,000; Singles and doubles draws	(Belarus) Ilona Kremen (Czech Republic) Kateřina Vaňková; 7–5, 6–0	(Czech Republic) Magdaléna Pantůčková (Belgium) Eliessa Vanlangendonck	(Japan) Haruna Arakawa (Russia) Anastasia Pribylova	(Bulgaria) Julia Stamatova (Paraguay) Camila Giangreco Campiz (Bulgaria) Dia Evtimova (Czech Republic) Magdaléna Pantůčková
April 30	O1 Properties Ladies Cup; Khimki, Russia; Hard (indoor) $100,000; Singles – Doubles	(Belarus) Vera Lapko; 6–1, 6–3	(Russia) Anastasia Potapova	(Romania) Monica Niculescu (Russia) Vitalia Diatchenko	(Serbia) Ivana Jorović (Israel) Deniz Khazaniuk (Serbia) Nina Stojanović (Israel) Julia Glushko
April 30	O1 Properties Ladies Cup; Khimki, Russia; Hard (indoor) $100,000; Singles – Doubles	(Russia) Olga Doroshina (Russia) Anastasiya Komardina; 6–1, 6–2	(Russia) Veronika Pepelyaeva (Russia) Anastasia Tikhonova	(Romania) Monica Niculescu (Russia) Vitalia Diatchenko	(Serbia) Ivana Jorović (Israel) Deniz Khazaniuk (Serbia) Nina Stojanović (Israel) Julia Glushko
April 30	Kangaroo Cup; Gifu, Japan; Hard $80,000; Singles – Doubles	(Japan) Kurumi Nara; 6–2, 7–6^{(7–4)}	(Japan) Moyuka Uchijima	(Japan) Nao Hibino (Australia) Abbie Myers	(United Kingdom) Harriet Dart (Japan) Miharu Imanishi (United Kingdom) Naomi Broady (Japan) Momoko Kobori
April 30	Kangaroo Cup; Gifu, Japan; Hard $80,000; Singles – Doubles	(Japan) Rika Fujiwara (Japan) Yuki Naito; 7–5, 6–4	(Russia) Ksenia Lykina (United Kingdom) Emily Webley-Smith	(Japan) Nao Hibino (Australia) Abbie Myers	(United Kingdom) Harriet Dart (Japan) Miharu Imanishi (United Kingdom) Naomi Broady (Japan) Momoko Kobori
April 30	LTP Charleston Pro Tennis; Charleston, United States; Clay $80,000; Singles – Doubles	(United States) Taylor Townsend; 6–0, 6–4	(United States) Madison Brengle	(Poland) Iga Świątek (United States) Katerina Stewart	(United States) Allie Kiick (United States) Irina Falconi (United States) Jamie Loeb (United States) Whitney Osuigwe
April 30	LTP Charleston Pro Tennis; Charleston, United States; Clay $80,000; Singles – Doubles	(Chile) Alexa Guarachi (New Zealand) Erin Routliffe; 6–1, 3–6, [10–5]	(United States) Louisa Chirico (United States) Allie Kiick	(Poland) Iga Świątek (United States) Katerina Stewart	(United States) Allie Kiick (United States) Irina Falconi (United States) Jamie Loeb (United States) Whitney Osuigwe
April 30	Tbilisi, Georgia; Hard $25,000; Singles and doubles draws	(Georgia (country)) Ekaterine Gorgodze; 6–4, 6–4	(Netherlands) Lesley Kerkhove	(Georgia (country)) Mariam Bolkvadze (Romania) Andreea Amalia Roșca	(Slovakia) Tereza Mihalíková (Bulgaria) Isabella Shinikova (Russia) Anastasia Frolova (Serbia) Bojana Jovanovski Petrović
April 30	Tbilisi, Georgia; Hard $25,000; Singles and doubles draws	(Slovakia) Tereza Mihalíková (Brazil) Laura Pigossi; 6–4, 6–1	(Belarus) Sviatlana Pirazhenka (Netherlands) Erika Vogelsang	(Georgia (country)) Mariam Bolkvadze (Romania) Andreea Amalia Roșca	(Slovakia) Tereza Mihalíková (Bulgaria) Isabella Shinikova (Russia) Anastasia Frolova (Serbia) Bojana Jovanovski Petrović
April 30	Balatonboglár, Hungary; Clay $25,000; Singles and doubles draws	(Slovenia) Kaja Juvan; 6–4, 6–1	(Romania) Raluca Georgiana Șerban	(Germany) Anna Zaja (Germany) Katharina Hobgarski	(Latvia) Daniela Vismane (Italy) Anna-Giulia Remondina (Romania) Miriam Bianca Bulgaru (France) Chloé Paquet
April 30	Balatonboglár, Hungary; Clay $25,000; Singles and doubles draws	(Hungary) Anna Bondár (Romania) Raluca Georgiana Șerban; 6–1, 7–6^{(7–2)}	(Hungary) Ágnes Bukta (Hungary) Dalma Gálfi	(Germany) Anna Zaja (Germany) Katharina Hobgarski	(Latvia) Daniela Vismane (Italy) Anna-Giulia Remondina (Romania) Miriam Bianca Bulgaru (France) Chloé Paquet
April 30	Cairo, Egypt; Clay $15,000; Singles and doubles draws	(Bulgaria) Gergana Topalova; 7–5, 7–6^{(7–3)}	(Spain) Nuria Párrizas Díaz	(India) Snehadevi Reddy (Bulgaria) Petia Arshinkova	(Sweden) Marina Yudanov (Austria) Marlies Szupper (Serbia) Bojana Marinković (Netherlands) Dominique Karregat
April 30	Cairo, Egypt; Clay $15,000; Singles and doubles draws	(Bulgaria) Petia Arshinkova (Bulgaria) Gergana Topalova; 4–6, 6–3, [10–4]	(India) Riya Bhatia (United States) Shelby Talcott	(India) Snehadevi Reddy (Bulgaria) Petia Arshinkova	(Sweden) Marina Yudanov (Austria) Marlies Szupper (Serbia) Bojana Marinković (Netherlands) Dominique Karregat
April 30	Akko, Israel; Hard $15,000; Singles and doubles draws	(Israel) Lina Glushko; 6–3, 6–3	(Germany) Caroline Werner	(Belarus) Anna Kubareva (United Kingdom) Emilie Lindh	(Israel) Nicole Nadel (Croatia) Iva Primorac (Romania) Elena-Teodora Cadar (France) Julia Vulpio
April 30	Akko, Israel; Hard $15,000; Singles and doubles draws	(United States) Madeleine Kobelt (Israel) Maya Tahan; 6–1, 6–3	(United States) Madison Bourguignon (United States) Aimee Tarun	(Belarus) Anna Kubareva (United Kingdom) Emilie Lindh	(Israel) Nicole Nadel (Croatia) Iva Primorac (Romania) Elena-Teodora Cadar (France) Julia Vulpio
April 30	Hua Hin, Thailand; Hard $15,000; Singles and doubles draws	(Thailand) Bunyawi Thamchaiwat; 6–1, 6–1	(Thailand) Nudnida Luangnam	(China) Ma Shuyue (India) Zeel Desai	(China) Zhang Ying (Indonesia) Aldila Sutjiadi (Slovakia) Zuzana Zlochová (China) Cai Xinyu
April 30	Hua Hin, Thailand; Hard $15,000; Singles and doubles draws	(India) Zeel Desai (Thailand) Bunyawi Thamchaiwat; 7–5, 6–1	(China) Sheng Yuqi (Indonesia) Aldila Sutjiadi	(China) Ma Shuyue (India) Zeel Desai	(China) Zhang Ying (Indonesia) Aldila Sutjiadi (Slovakia) Zuzana Zlochová (China) Cai Xinyu
April 30	Hammamet, Tunisia; Clay $15,000; Singles and doubles draws	(Slovenia) Pia Čuk; 6–3, 7–5	(Japan) Mana Ayukawa	(Romania) Ioana Loredana Roșca (France) Victoria Muntean	(Spain) Guiomar Maristany (Switzerland) Nina Stadler (Czech Republic) Dagmar Dudláková (Romania) Cristina Adamescu
April 30	Hammamet, Tunisia; Clay $15,000; Singles and doubles draws	(Romania) Cristina Adamescu (Romania) Ioana Loredana Roșca; 6–4, 6–3	(Japan) Mana Ayukawa (Spain) Alicia Herrero Liñana	(Romania) Ioana Loredana Roșca (France) Victoria Muntean	(Spain) Guiomar Maristany (Switzerland) Nina Stadler (Czech Republic) Dagmar Dudláková (Romania) Cristina Adamescu
April 30	Antalya, Turkey; Clay $15,000; Singles and doubles draws	(Colombia) María Fernanda Herazo; 6–4, 6–1	(Japan) Haruna Arakawa	(Bulgaria) Dia Evtimova (United States) Elizabeth Halbauer	(Paraguay) Camila Giangreco Campiz (China) Ni Ma Zhuoma (Netherlands) Lexie Stevens (Bulgaria) Julia Stamatova
April 30	Antalya, Turkey; Clay $15,000; Singles and doubles draws	(Japan) Haruna Arakawa (Belarus) Ilona Kremen; Walkover	(China) Ni Ma Zhuoma (China) You Mi Zhuoma	(Bulgaria) Dia Evtimova (United States) Elizabeth Halbauer	(Paraguay) Camila Giangreco Campiz (China) Ni Ma Zhuoma (Netherlands) Lexie Stevens (Bulgaria) Julia Stamatova

=== May ===
Week of	Tournament	Winner	Runners-up	Semifinalists	Quarterfinalists
May 7	Open de Cagnes-sur-Mer; Cagnes-sur-Mer, France; Clay $100,000; Singles – Doubles	(Sweden) Rebecca Peterson; 6–4, 7–5	(Ukraine) Dayana Yastremska	(Tunisia) Ons Jabeur (Germany) Andrea Petkovic	(Netherlands) Bibiane Schoofs (Chile) Daniela Seguel (Slovakia) Viktória Kužmová (Switzerland) Viktorija Golubic
May 7	Open de Cagnes-sur-Mer; Cagnes-sur-Mer, France; Clay $100,000; Singles – Doubles	(United States) Kaitlyn Christian (United States) Sabrina Santamaria; 2–6, 7–5, [10–7]	(Belarus) Vera Lapko (Kazakhstan) Galina Voskoboeva	(Tunisia) Ons Jabeur (Germany) Andrea Petkovic	(Netherlands) Bibiane Schoofs (Chile) Daniela Seguel (Slovakia) Viktória Kužmová (Switzerland) Viktorija Golubic
May 7	Jin'an Open; Lu'an, China; Hard $60,000; Singles – Doubles	(China) Zhu Lin; 6–0, 6–2	(China) Liu Fangzhou	(United Kingdom) Harriet Dart (China) Xun Fangying	(Japan) Mai Minokoshi (India) Karman Thandi (India) Ankita Raina (Japan) Erika Sema
May 7	Jin'an Open; Lu'an, China; Hard $60,000; Singles – Doubles	(United Kingdom) Harriet Dart (India) Ankita Raina; 6–3, 6–3	(China) Liu Fangzhou (China) Xun Fangying	(United Kingdom) Harriet Dart (China) Xun Fangying	(Japan) Mai Minokoshi (India) Karman Thandi (India) Ankita Raina (Japan) Erika Sema
May 7	Fukuoka International Women's Cup; Fukuoka, Japan; Carpet $60,000; Singles – Doubles	(United Kingdom) Katie Boulter; 5–7, 6–4, 6–2	(Russia) Ksenia Lykina	(Japan) Momoko Kobori (Australia) Arina Rodionova	(United Kingdom) Naomi Broady (Serbia) Ivana Jorović (United Kingdom) Katy Dunne (Japan) Rika Fujiwara
May 7	Fukuoka International Women's Cup; Fukuoka, Japan; Carpet $60,000; Singles – Doubles	(United Kingdom) Naomi Broady (United States) Asia Muhammad; 6–2, 6–0	(United Kingdom) Tara Moore (Switzerland) Amra Sadiković	(Japan) Momoko Kobori (Australia) Arina Rodionova	(United Kingdom) Naomi Broady (Serbia) Ivana Jorović (United Kingdom) Katy Dunne (Japan) Rika Fujiwara
May 7	Rome, Italy; Clay $25,000; Singles and doubles draws	(Italy) Martina Di Giuseppe; 7–5, 7–6^{(7–4)}	(Hungary) Fanny Stollár	(Israel) Julia Glushko (Czech Republic) Monika Kilnarová	(Czech Republic) Jesika Malečková (South Africa) Chanel Simmonds (Croatia) Tena Lukas (Mexico) Renata Zarazúa
May 7	Rome, Italy; Clay $25,000; Singles and doubles draws	(Switzerland) Conny Perrin (South Africa) Chanel Simmonds; 6–7^{(0–7)}, 6–1, [10–7]	(Chinese Taipei) Chen Pei-hsuan (Chinese Taipei) Wu Fang-hsien	(Israel) Julia Glushko (Czech Republic) Monika Kilnarová	(Czech Republic) Jesika Malečková (South Africa) Chanel Simmonds (Croatia) Tena Lukas (Mexico) Renata Zarazúa
May 7	Goyang, South Korea; Hard $25,000; Singles and doubles draws	(Japan) Mayo Hibi; 6–3, 6–3	(Chinese Taipei) Liang En-shuo	(South Korea) Choi Ji-hee (South Korea) Han Na-lae	(South Korea) Lee So-ra (Chinese Taipei) Lee Ya-hsuan (United Kingdom) Maia Lumsden (Hong Kong) Zhang Ling
May 7	Goyang, South Korea; Hard $25,000; Singles and doubles draws	(South Korea) Han Na-lae (South Korea) Lee So-ra; 6–2, 5–7, [10–2]	(Norway) Ulrikke Eikeri (Japan) Akiko Omae	(South Korea) Choi Ji-hee (South Korea) Han Na-lae	(South Korea) Lee So-ra (Chinese Taipei) Lee Ya-hsuan (United Kingdom) Maia Lumsden (Hong Kong) Zhang Ling
May 7	Torneo Conchita Martínez; Monzón, Spain; Hard $25,000; Singles and doubles draws	(United Kingdom) Katie Swan; 6–2, 6–3	(Spain) Aliona Bolsova Zadoinov	(Italy) Giulia Gatto-Monticone (Spain) Eva Guerrero Álvarez	(Czech Republic) Marie Bouzková (Russia) Margarita Gasparyan (Spain) Marina Bassols Ribera (India) Pranjala Yadlapalli
May 7	Torneo Conchita Martínez; Monzón, Spain; Hard $25,000; Singles and doubles draws	(Spain) Cristina Bucșa (Russia) Yana Sizikova; 6–2, 5–7, [10–8]	(United Kingdom) Sarah Beth Grey (United Kingdom) Olivia Nicholls	(Italy) Giulia Gatto-Monticone (Spain) Eva Guerrero Álvarez	(Czech Republic) Marie Bouzková (Russia) Margarita Gasparyan (Spain) Marina Bassols Ribera (India) Pranjala Yadlapalli
May 7	Cairo, Egypt; Clay $15,000; Singles and doubles draws	(Egypt) Sandra Samir; 6–0, 6–3	(United States) Shelby Talcott	(Egypt) Lamis Alhussein Abdel Aziz (Bulgaria) Gergana Topalova	(Argentina) Melany Solange Krywoj (India) Riya Bhatia (Bulgaria) Petia Arshinkova (Netherlands) Dominique Karregat
May 7	Cairo, Egypt; Clay $15,000; Singles and doubles draws	(Egypt) Lamis Alhussein Abdel Aziz (Canada) Maria Patrascu; 4–6, 6–3, [11–9]	(Egypt) Ola Abou Zekry (Egypt) Sandra Samir	(Egypt) Lamis Alhussein Abdel Aziz (Bulgaria) Gergana Topalova	(Argentina) Melany Solange Krywoj (India) Riya Bhatia (Bulgaria) Petia Arshinkova (Netherlands) Dominique Karregat
May 7	Kaposvár, Hungary; Clay $15,000; Singles and doubles draws	(Hungary) Anna Bondár; 6–4, 7–6^{(7–3)}	(Czech Republic) Aneta Kladivová	(Czech Republic) Kateřina Vaňková (Russia) Maria Marfutina	(Hungary) Adrienn Nagy (United States) Elysia Bolton (Slovenia) Nika Radišič (Hungary) Réka Luca Jani
May 7	Kaposvár, Hungary; Clay $15,000; Singles and doubles draws	(Hungary) Anna Bondár (Hungary) Panna Udvardy; 7–6^{(8–6)}, 6–1	(Ukraine) Yuliya Lysa (Russia) Maria Marfutina	(Czech Republic) Kateřina Vaňková (Russia) Maria Marfutina	(Hungary) Adrienn Nagy (United States) Elysia Bolton (Slovenia) Nika Radišič (Hungary) Réka Luca Jani
May 7	Sajur, Israel; Hard $15,000; Singles and doubles draws	(Romania) Ilona Georgiana Ghioroaie; 6–2, 6–2	(Turkey) Melis Sezer	(Romania) Elena-Teodora Cadar (Israel) Shelly Bereznyak	(Russia) Vasilisa Aponasenko (Russia) Margarita Lazareva (France) Julia Vulpio (Belarus) Sadafmoh Tolibova
May 7	Sajur, Israel; Hard $15,000; Singles and doubles draws	(United States) Madeleine Kobelt (Croatia) Iva Primorac; 6–3, 6–3	(Israel) Tamara Barad Itzhaki (Israel) Adva Dabah	(Romania) Elena-Teodora Cadar (Israel) Shelly Bereznyak	(Russia) Vasilisa Aponasenko (Russia) Margarita Lazareva (France) Julia Vulpio (Belarus) Sadafmoh Tolibova
May 7	Karlskrona, Sweden; Clay $15,000; Singles and doubles draws	(France) Irina Ramialison; 5–7, 7–5, 6–0	(Denmark) Karen Barritza	(Germany) Lisa Matviyenko (United Kingdom) Francesca Jones	(United States) Chanelle Van Nguyen (Sweden) Mirjam Björklund (Sweden) Molly Helgesson (Norway) Malene Helgø
May 7	Karlskrona, Sweden; Clay $15,000; Singles and doubles draws	(Romania) Cristina Adamescu (Romania) Andreea Ghițescu; 7–5, 7–5	(Norway) Astrid Wanja Brune Olsen (Norway) Malene Helgø	(Germany) Lisa Matviyenko (United Kingdom) Francesca Jones	(United States) Chanelle Van Nguyen (Sweden) Mirjam Björklund (Sweden) Molly Helgesson (Norway) Malene Helgø
May 7	Hua Hin, Thailand; Hard $15,000; Singles and doubles draws	(Thailand) Mananchaya Sawangkaew; 1–6, 7–6^{(7–3)}, 2–1 ret.	(Thailand) Bunyawi Thamchaiwat	(United States) Lorraine Guillermo (Slovakia) Zuzana Zlochová	(Indonesia) Aldila Sutjiadi (Thailand) Tamachan Momkoonthod (Thailand) Nudnida Luangnam (Thailand) Patcharin Cheapchandej
May 7	Hua Hin, Thailand; Hard $15,000; Singles and doubles draws	(China) Wang Danni (United States) Amy Zhu; 1–6, 6–4, [10–7]	(China) Sheng Yuqi (Indonesia) Aldila Sutjiadi	(United States) Lorraine Guillermo (Slovakia) Zuzana Zlochová	(Indonesia) Aldila Sutjiadi (Thailand) Tamachan Momkoonthod (Thailand) Nudnida Luangnam (Thailand) Patcharin Cheapchandej
May 7	Tacarigua, Trinidad and Tobago; Hard $15,000; Singles and doubles draws	(Mexico) María José Portillo Ramírez; 6–2, 6–2	(Mexico) Andrea Renée Villarreal	(Vietnam) Csilla Fodor (United States) Gail Brodsky	(United Kingdom) Emily Appleton (United States) Akilah James (Trinidad and Tobago) Yolande Leacock (Guatemala) Kirsten-Andrea Weedon
May 7	Tacarigua, Trinidad and Tobago; Hard $15,000; Singles and doubles draws	(United Kingdom) Emily Appleton (Mexico) María José Portillo Ramírez; 6–4, 6–3	(The Bahamas) Kerrie Cartwright (United States) Kariann Pierre-Louis	(Vietnam) Csilla Fodor (United States) Gail Brodsky	(United Kingdom) Emily Appleton (United States) Akilah James (Trinidad and Tobago) Yolande Leacock (Guatemala) Kirsten-Andrea Weedon
May 7	Hammamet, Tunisia; Clay $15,000; Singles and doubles draws	(Spain) Guiomar Maristany; 7–6^{(7–1)}, 6–3	(Russia) Victoria Kan	(Switzerland) Svenja Ochsner (Italy) Verena Hofer	(Romania) Denise-Antonela Stoica (Tunisia) Chiraz Bechri (Bolivia) Noelia Zeballos (Cambodia) Andrea Ka
May 7	Hammamet, Tunisia; Clay $15,000; Singles and doubles draws	(Italy) Verena Hofer (Cambodia) Andrea Ka; 1–6, 6–2, [10–8]	(Moldova) Vitalia Stamat (Russia) Maria Zotova	(Switzerland) Svenja Ochsner (Italy) Verena Hofer	(Romania) Denise-Antonela Stoica (Tunisia) Chiraz Bechri (Bolivia) Noelia Zeballos (Cambodia) Andrea Ka
May 7	Antalya, Turkey; Clay $15,000; Singles and doubles draws	(United States) Elizabeth Halbauer; 6–3, 6–1	(Georgia (country)) Mariam Bolkvadze	(Netherlands) Lexie Stevens (Ukraine) Marianna Zakarlyuk	(Russia) Aleksandra Pospelova (Belgium) Margaux Bovy (Finland) Piia Suomalainen (Belarus) Ilona Kremen
May 7	Antalya, Turkey; Clay $15,000; Singles and doubles draws	(Japan) Haruna Arakawa (Belarus) Ilona Kremen; 6–1, 6–0	(Romania) Alexandra Diana Braga (Romania) Oana Georgeta Simion	(Netherlands) Lexie Stevens (Ukraine) Marianna Zakarlyuk	(Russia) Aleksandra Pospelova (Belgium) Margaux Bovy (Finland) Piia Suomalainen (Belarus) Ilona Kremen
May 14	Empire Slovak Open; Trnava, Slovakia; Clay $100,000; Singles – Doubles	(Slovakia) Viktória Kužmová; 6–4, 1–6, 6–1	(Paraguay) Verónica Cepede Royg	(Russia) Ekaterina Alexandrova (Russia) Anna Blinkova	(Sweden) Johanna Larsson (Japan) Kurumi Nara (Czech Republic) Tereza Martincová (Ukraine) Anhelina Kalinina
May 14	Empire Slovak Open; Trnava, Slovakia; Clay $100,000; Singles – Doubles	(Australia) Jessica Moore (Kazakhstan) Galina Voskoboeva; 0–6, 6–3, [10–7]	(Switzerland) Xenia Knoll (United Kingdom) Anna Smith	(Russia) Ekaterina Alexandrova (Russia) Anna Blinkova	(Sweden) Johanna Larsson (Japan) Kurumi Nara (Czech Republic) Tereza Martincová (Ukraine) Anhelina Kalinina
May 14	Open Saint-Gaudens Occitanie; Saint-Gaudens, France; Clay $60,000; Singles – Doubles	(Belarus) Vera Lapko; 6–2, 6–4	(Netherlands) Quirine Lemoine	(Australia) Jaimee Fourlis (Netherlands) Arantxa Rus	(Ukraine) Katarina Zavatska (France) Shérazad Reix (Greece) Valentini Grammatikopoulou (Bulgaria) Viktoriya Tomova
May 14	Open Saint-Gaudens Occitanie; Saint-Gaudens, France; Clay $60,000; Singles – Doubles	(Australia) Naiktha Bains (United States) Francesca Di Lorenzo; 6–4, 1–6, [11–9]	(France) Manon Arcangioli (France) Shérazad Reix	(Australia) Jaimee Fourlis (Netherlands) Arantxa Rus	(Ukraine) Katarina Zavatska (France) Shérazad Reix (Greece) Valentini Grammatikopoulou (Bulgaria) Viktoriya Tomova
May 14	Kurume Cup; Kurume, Japan; Carpet $60,000; Singles – Doubles	(Japan) Ayano Shimizu; 6–3, 7–5	(Australia) Abbie Myers	(United Kingdom) Naomi Broady (Russia) Ksenia Lykina	(United Kingdom) Katy Dunne (Australia) Tammi Patterson (Japan) Haruka Kaji (Australia) Arina Rodionova
May 14	Kurume Cup; Kurume, Japan; Carpet $60,000; Singles – Doubles	(United Kingdom) Naomi Broady (United States) Asia Muhammad; 6–2, 6–4	(United Kingdom) Katy Dunne (Papua New Guinea) Abigail Tere-Apisah	(United Kingdom) Naomi Broady (Russia) Ksenia Lykina	(United Kingdom) Katy Dunne (Australia) Tammi Patterson (Japan) Haruka Kaji (Australia) Arina Rodionova
May 14	Wuhan City Vocational College Cup; Wuhan, China; Hard $25,000; Singles and doubles draws	(China) Lu Jiajing; 2–6, 6–4, 6–3	(China) Yuan Yue	(United Kingdom) Emily Webley-Smith (India) Rutuja Bhosale	(China) Ma Shuyue (China) Guo Hanyu (Oman) Fatma Al-Nabhani (China) Zheng Wushuang
May 14	Wuhan City Vocational College Cup; Wuhan, China; Hard $25,000; Singles and doubles draws	(Japan) Mai Minokoshi (Japan) Erika Sema; 6–4, 6–1	(China) Guo Hanyu (China) Zhang Ying	(United Kingdom) Emily Webley-Smith (India) Rutuja Bhosale	(China) Ma Shuyue (China) Guo Hanyu (Oman) Fatma Al-Nabhani (China) Zheng Wushuang
May 14	Incheon, South Korea; Hard $25,000; Singles and doubles draws	(Chinese Taipei) Liang En-shuo; 6–2, 0–6, 7–5	(South Korea) Han Na-lae	(South Korea) Lee So-ra (Turkey) Berfu Cengiz	(South Korea) Kim Da-bin (South Korea) Choi Ji-hee (Norway) Ulrikke Eikeri (Japan) Akiko Omae
May 14	Incheon, South Korea; Hard $25,000; Singles and doubles draws	(South Korea) Han Na-lae (South Korea) Kim Na-ri; 5–0, ret.	(Chinese Taipei) Chang Kai-chen (Chinese Taipei) Hsu Ching-wen	(South Korea) Lee So-ra (Turkey) Berfu Cengiz	(South Korea) Kim Da-bin (South Korea) Choi Ji-hee (Norway) Ulrikke Eikeri (Japan) Akiko Omae
May 14	La Bisbal d'Empordà, Spain; Clay $25,000+H; Singles and doubles draws	(Liechtenstein) Kathinka von Deichmann; 6–3, 3–6, 6–3	(Spain) Sara Sorribes Tormo	(Russia) Vitalia Diatchenko (Switzerland) Jil Teichmann	(Spain) Estrella Cabeza Candela (China) Wang Xiyu (Spain) Paula Badosa Gibert (Paraguay) Montserrat González
May 14	La Bisbal d'Empordà, Spain; Clay $25,000+H; Singles and doubles draws	(United States) Jamie Loeb (Mexico) Ana Sofía Sánchez; 6–3, 6–2	(Spain) Yvonne Cavallé Reimers (United States) Chiara Scholl	(Russia) Vitalia Diatchenko (Switzerland) Jil Teichmann	(Spain) Estrella Cabeza Candela (China) Wang Xiyu (Spain) Paula Badosa Gibert (Paraguay) Montserrat González
May 14	Tiberias, Israel; Hard $15,000; Singles and doubles draws	(United Kingdom) Emma Raducanu; 7–6^{(7–3)}, 6–4	(Belgium) Hélène Scholsen	(Romania) Elena-Teodora Cadar (Israel) Vlada Ekshibarova	(France) Fiona Codino (Russia) Vasilisa Aponasenko (Israel) Nicole Nadel (Czech Republic) Laetitia Pulchartová
May 14	Tiberias, Israel; Hard $15,000; Singles and doubles draws	(India) Riya Bhatia (United States) Madeleine Kobelt; 6–3, 6–2	(Israel) Shavit Kimchi (Israel) Maya Tahan	(Romania) Elena-Teodora Cadar (Israel) Vlada Ekshibarova	(France) Fiona Codino (Russia) Vasilisa Aponasenko (Israel) Nicole Nadel (Czech Republic) Laetitia Pulchartová
May 14	San Severo, Italy; Clay $15,000; Singles and doubles draws	(Greece) Despina Papamichail; 6–1, 6–2	(Switzerland) Simona Waltert	(Switzerland) Susan Bandecchi (Italy) Lucia Bronzetti	(Romania) Andreea Ghițescu (Germany) Jule Niemeier (Chinese Taipei) Chen Pei-hsuan (Italy) Giorgia Marchetti
May 14	San Severo, Italy; Clay $15,000; Singles and doubles draws	(Chinese Taipei) Chen Pei-hsuan (Chinese Taipei) Wu Fang-hsien; 6–3, 6–4	(Belarus) Sviatlana Pirazhenka (Georgia (country)) Sofia Shapatava	(Switzerland) Susan Bandecchi (Italy) Lucia Bronzetti	(Romania) Andreea Ghițescu (Germany) Jule Niemeier (Chinese Taipei) Chen Pei-hsuan (Italy) Giorgia Marchetti
May 14	Gothenburg, Sweden; Clay $15,000; Singles and doubles draws	(United States) Raveena Kingsley; 6–2, 6–4	(Sweden) Mirjam Björklund	(France) Irina Ramialison (United States) Chanelle Van Nguyen	(United Kingdom) Alice Gillan (Denmark) Clara Tauson (Denmark) Emilie Francati (France) Alice Ramé
May 14	Gothenburg, Sweden; Clay $15,000; Singles and doubles draws	(United Kingdom) Anna Popescu (Sweden) Marina Yudanov; 6–4, 6–2	(Lithuania) Joana Eidukonytė (Poland) Daria Kuczer	(France) Irina Ramialison (United States) Chanelle Van Nguyen	(United Kingdom) Alice Gillan (Denmark) Clara Tauson (Denmark) Emilie Francati (France) Alice Ramé
May 14	Hammamet, Tunisia; Clay $15,000; Singles and doubles draws	(Italy) Angelica Moratelli; 7–5, 7–5	(France) Jade Suvrijn	(France) Mathilde Armitano (France) Marie Témin	(Germany) Julyette Steur (Italy) Federica Prati (Germany) Yana Morderger (Italy) Lucrezia Stefanini
May 14	Hammamet, Tunisia; Clay $15,000; Singles and doubles draws	(Belgium) Marie Benoît (Italy) Angelica Moratelli; 6–3, 6–4	(Russia) Ulyana Ayzatulina (Germany) Julyette Steur	(France) Mathilde Armitano (France) Marie Témin	(Germany) Julyette Steur (Italy) Federica Prati (Germany) Yana Morderger (Italy) Lucrezia Stefanini
May 14	Antalya, Turkey; Clay $15,000; Singles and doubles draws	(Czech Republic) Magdaléna Pantůčková; 6–4, 6–1	(Georgia (country)) Mariam Bolkvadze	(Russia) Valeriya Yushchenko (Austria) Mira Antonitsch	(Croatia) Mariana Dražić (Romania) Cristina Ene (China) Ni Ma Zhuoma (Romania) Oana Georgeta Simion
May 14	Antalya, Turkey; Clay $15,000; Singles and doubles draws	(Japan) Haruna Arakawa (Czech Republic) Magdaléna Pantůčková; 7–5, 7–6^{(7–3)}	(Netherlands) Suzan Lamens (Romania) Arina Gabriela Vasilescu	(Russia) Valeriya Yushchenko (Austria) Mira Antonitsch	(Croatia) Mariana Dražić (Romania) Cristina Ene (China) Ni Ma Zhuoma (Romania) Oana Georgeta Simion
May 21	ITF Women's Circuit – Baotou; Baotou, China; Clay (indoor) $60,000; Singles – Doubles	(Serbia) Nina Stojanović; 6–0, 6–4	(China) Xu Shilin	(China) Zhang Kailin (China) Ma Shuyue	(China) Zheng Wushuang (Russia) Nika Kukharchuk (Japan) Mai Minokoshi (Romania) Andreea Amalia Roșca
May 21	ITF Women's Circuit – Baotou; Baotou, China; Clay (indoor) $60,000; Singles – Doubles	(Australia) Alison Bai (Bulgaria) Aleksandrina Naydenova; 6–4, 0–6, [10–6]	(Serbia) Natalija Kostić (Russia) Nika Kukharchuk	(China) Zhang Kailin (China) Ma Shuyue	(China) Zheng Wushuang (Russia) Nika Kukharchuk (Japan) Mai Minokoshi (Romania) Andreea Amalia Roșca
May 21	Caserta, Italy; Clay $25,000; Singles and doubles draws	(Belgium) Kimberley Zimmermann; 1–6, 7–5, 6–1	(Italy) Stefania Rubini	(Italy) Anastasia Grymalska (Belgium) Marie Benoît	(Italy) Ludmilla Samsonova (Germany) Laura Schaeder (Switzerland) Lisa Sabino (Netherlands) Cindy Burger
May 21	Caserta, Italy; Clay $25,000; Singles and doubles draws	(Chinese Taipei) Chen Pei-hsuan (Chinese Taipei) Wu Fang-hsien; 7–6^{(8–6)}, 6–3	(Australia) Jaimee Fourlis (Australia) Ellen Perez	(Italy) Anastasia Grymalska (Belgium) Marie Benoît	(Italy) Ludmilla Samsonova (Germany) Laura Schaeder (Switzerland) Lisa Sabino (Netherlands) Cindy Burger
May 21	Karuizawa, Japan; Carpet $25,000; Singles and doubles draws	(Japan) Momoko Kobori; 6–0, 6–2	(Japan) Miyabi Inoue	(Australia) Abbie Myers (Australia) Tammi Patterson	(Japan) Mei Yamaguchi (Japan) Sakura Hondo (Japan) Kanako Morisaki (United States) Asia Muhammad
May 21	Karuizawa, Japan; Carpet $25,000; Singles and doubles draws	(Japan) Momoko Kobori (Japan) Ayano Shimizu; 6–0, 6–3	(Japan) Chisa Hosonuma (Japan) Kanako Morisaki	(Australia) Abbie Myers (Australia) Tammi Patterson	(Japan) Mei Yamaguchi (Japan) Sakura Hondo (Japan) Kanako Morisaki (United States) Asia Muhammad
May 21	Changwon, South Korea; Hard $25,000; Singles and doubles draws	(Chinese Taipei) Lee Ya-hsuan; 0–6, 6–3, 6–0	(Russia) Varvara Flink	(South Korea) Jeong Su-nam (Norway) Ulrikke Eikeri	(South Korea) Choi Ji-hee (Japan) Risa Ozaki (South Korea) Lee So-ra (Mexico) Victoria Rodríguez
May 21	Changwon, South Korea; Hard $25,000; Singles and doubles draws	(South Korea) Kim Na-ri (South Korea) Lee So-ra; 6–1, 6–1	(South Korea) Kim Da-bin (South Korea) Yu Min-hwa	(South Korea) Jeong Su-nam (Norway) Ulrikke Eikeri	(South Korea) Choi Ji-hee (Japan) Risa Ozaki (South Korea) Lee So-ra (Mexico) Victoria Rodríguez
May 21	Les Franqueses del Vallès, Spain; Hard $25,000; Singles and doubles draws	(Spain) Paula Badosa Gibert; 6–4, 3–6, 6–2	(Russia) Margarita Gasparyan	(Romania) Raluca Georgiana Șerban (United Kingdom) Katie Swan	(Spain) Olga Sáez Larra (France) Elixane Lechemia (Mexico) Ana Sofía Sánchez (Australia) Seone Mendez
May 21	Les Franqueses del Vallès, Spain; Hard $25,000; Singles and doubles draws	(Mexico) Giuliana Olmos (Brazil) Laura Pigossi; 6–4, 6–4	(Romania) Raluca Georgiana Șerban (India) Pranjala Yadlapalli	(Romania) Raluca Georgiana Șerban (United Kingdom) Katie Swan	(Spain) Olga Sáez Larra (France) Elixane Lechemia (Mexico) Ana Sofía Sánchez (Australia) Seone Mendez
May 21	The Oaks Club Challenger; Osprey, United States; Clay $25,000; Singles and doubles draws	(Israel) Deniz Khazaniuk; 6–4, 4–6, [10–6]	(United States) Sophie Chang	(United States) Usue Maitane Arconada (United States) Ashley Kratzer	(United States) Hailey Baptiste (United States) Katerina Stewart (United States) Salma Ewing (United States) Allie Kiick
May 21	The Oaks Club Challenger; Osprey, United States; Clay $25,000; Singles and doubles draws	Doubles competition abandoned due to bad weather		(United States) Usue Maitane Arconada (United States) Ashley Kratzer	(United States) Hailey Baptiste (United States) Katerina Stewart (United States) Salma Ewing (United States) Allie Kiick
May 21	Oeiras, Portugal; Clay $15,000; Singles and doubles draws	(Switzerland) Ylena In-Albon; 7–5, ret.	(Belgium) Tamaryn Hendler	(France) Lucie Wargnier (Australia) Gabriella Da Silva-Fick	(Spain) Lucía Cortez Llorca (Spain) Lucía Marzal Martínez (Romania) Karola Patricia Bejenaru (Portugal) Maria João Koehler
May 21	Oeiras, Portugal; Clay $15,000; Singles and doubles draws	(Germany) Anna Klasen (Germany) Romy Kölzer; 6–3, 6–3	(Spain) Alba Carrillo Marín (Portugal) Cláudia Cianci	(France) Lucie Wargnier (Australia) Gabriella Da Silva-Fick	(Spain) Lucía Cortez Llorca (Spain) Lucía Marzal Martínez (Romania) Karola Patricia Bejenaru (Portugal) Maria João Koehler
May 21	Hammamet, Tunisia; Clay $15,000; Singles and doubles draws	(Italy) Angelica Moratelli; 6–3, 6–3	(Italy) Nastassja Burnett	(Greece) Eleni Kordolaimi (Germany) Tayisiya Morderger	(Greece) Danai Petroula (Canada) Petra Januskova (France) Marie Témin (Germany) Julyette Steur
May 21	Hammamet, Tunisia; Clay $15,000; Singles and doubles draws	(Canada) Petra Januskova (Germany) Julyette Steur; 6–0, 6–0	(United States) Brittany Collens (Germany) Celine Fritsch	(Greece) Eleni Kordolaimi (Germany) Tayisiya Morderger	(Greece) Danai Petroula (Canada) Petra Januskova (France) Marie Témin (Germany) Julyette Steur
May 21	Antalya, Turkey; Clay $15,000; Singles and doubles draws	(Belgium) Greet Minnen; 6–0, 6–1	(Bulgaria) Julia Stamatova	(Czech Republic) Magdaléna Pantůčková (Russia) Valeriya Yushchenko	(Belgium) Justine Pysson (Russia) Anna Pribylova (Russia) Angelina Zhuravleva (Georgia (country)) Mariam Bolkvadze
May 21	Antalya, Turkey; Clay $15,000; Singles and doubles draws	(Austria) Mira Antonitsch (Czech Republic) Johana Marková; 6–3, 7–5	(Japan) Haruna Arakawa (Czech Republic) Magdaléna Pantůčková	(Czech Republic) Magdaléna Pantůčková (Russia) Valeriya Yushchenko	(Belgium) Justine Pysson (Russia) Anna Pribylova (Russia) Angelina Zhuravleva (Georgia (country)) Mariam Bolkvadze
May 28	Luzhou, China; Hard $25,000; Singles and doubles draws	(China) Zhang Yuxuan; 6–2, 6–0	(China) Gai Ao	(China) You Xiaodi (Romania) Andreea Amalia Roșca	(China) Han Xinyun (Australia) Alison Bai (China) Cao Siqi (China) Lu Jingjing
May 28	Luzhou, China; Hard $25,000; Singles and doubles draws	(China) Han Xinyun (China) Lu Jingjing; 6–3, 6–3	(Australia) Alison Bai (Romania) Andreea Amalia Roșca	(China) You Xiaodi (Romania) Andreea Amalia Roșca	(China) Han Xinyun (Australia) Alison Bai (China) Cao Siqi (China) Lu Jingjing
May 28	Grado, Italy; Clay $25,000; Singles and doubles draws	(Turkey) Çağla Büyükakçay; 6–2, 6–2	(Italy) Martina Di Giuseppe	(Mexico) Renata Zarazúa (Spain) Sílvia Soler Espinosa	(Romania) Jaqueline Cristian (Ukraine) Katarina Zavatska (Belgium) Marie Benoît (Colombia) Camila Osorio
May 28	Grado, Italy; Clay $25,000; Singles and doubles draws	(Italy) Giorgia Marchetti (Italy) Alice Matteucci; 6–0, 6–4	(Australia) Naiktha Bains (Japan) Rika Fujiwara	(Mexico) Renata Zarazúa (Spain) Sílvia Soler Espinosa	(Romania) Jaqueline Cristian (Ukraine) Katarina Zavatska (Belgium) Marie Benoît (Colombia) Camila Osorio
May 28	Óbidos, Portugal; Carpet $25,000; Singles and doubles draws	(Poland) Katarzyna Kawa; 4–6, 7–5, 6–3	(Serbia) Dejana Radanović	(Switzerland) Ylena In-Albon (North Macedonia) Lina Gjorcheska	(Italy) Dalila Spiteri (Poland) Urszula Radwańska (Russia) Amina Anshba (Germany) Lena Rüffer
May 28	Óbidos, Portugal; Carpet $25,000; Singles and doubles draws	(Russia) Amina Anshba (Georgia (country)) Sofia Shapatava; 6–7^{(4–7)}, 6–0, [11–9]	(Romania) Laura-Ioana Andrei (Germany) Julia Wachaczyk	(Switzerland) Ylena In-Albon (North Macedonia) Lina Gjorcheska	(Italy) Dalila Spiteri (Poland) Urszula Radwańska (Russia) Amina Anshba (Germany) Lena Rüffer
May 28	Hua Hin, Thailand; Hard $25,000; Singles and doubles draws	(Israel) Julia Glushko; 6–2, 6–2	(Australia) Alexandra Bozovic	(Australia) Kaylah McPhee (China) Zhang Kailin	(India) Pranjala Yadlapalli (Thailand) Watsachol Sawatdee (China) Kang Jiaqi (Australia) Maddison Inglis
May 28	Hua Hin, Thailand; Hard $25,000; Singles and doubles draws	(Mexico) Victoria Rodríguez (New Zealand) Erin Routliffe; 7–5, 3–6, [10–6]	(Thailand) Nicha Lertpitaksinchai (Thailand) Peangtarn Plipuech	(Australia) Kaylah McPhee (China) Zhang Kailin	(India) Pranjala Yadlapalli (Thailand) Watsachol Sawatdee (China) Kang Jiaqi (Australia) Maddison Inglis
May 28	Naples, United States; Clay $25,000; Singles and doubles draws	(United States) Nicole Gibbs; 6–4, 6–4	(United States) Ashley Kratzer	(United States) Allie Kiick (United States) Robin Anderson	(Brazil) Paula Cristina Gonçalves (United States) Ann Li (United States) Hailey Baptiste (Israel) Deniz Khazaniuk
May 28	Naples, United States; Clay $25,000; Singles and doubles draws	(Kazakhstan) Anna Danilina (Australia) Genevieve Lorbergs; 6–3, 1–6, [11–9]	(United States) Rasheeda McAdoo (United States) Katerina Stewart	(United States) Allie Kiick (United States) Robin Anderson	(Brazil) Paula Cristina Gonçalves (United States) Ann Li (United States) Hailey Baptiste (Israel) Deniz Khazaniuk
May 28	Andijan, Uzbekistan; Hard $25,000; Singles and doubles draws	(Uzbekistan) Sabina Sharipova; 6–4, 6–2	(Slovenia) Kaja Juvan	(Belarus) Iryna Shymanovich (Kyrgyzstan) Ksenia Palkina	(Ukraine) Valeriya Strakhova (Russia) Varvara Flink (Bulgaria) Julia Terziyska (Russia) Valeriya Zeleva
May 28	Andijan, Uzbekistan; Hard $25,000; Singles and doubles draws	(Belarus) Ilona Kremen (Belarus) Iryna Shymanovich; 6–4, 6–4	(Russia) Anastasia Gasanova (Russia) Ekaterina Yashina	(Belarus) Iryna Shymanovich (Kyrgyzstan) Ksenia Palkina	(Ukraine) Valeriya Strakhova (Russia) Varvara Flink (Bulgaria) Julia Terziyska (Russia) Valeriya Zeleva
May 28	Niš, Serbia; Clay $15,000; Singles and doubles draws	(Czech Republic) Gabriela Horáčková; 7–5, 6–3	(Slovakia) Timea Jarušková	(Greece) Despina Papamichail (Brazil) Eduarda Piai	(Czech Republic) Gabriela Pantůčková (Brazil) Rebeca Pereira (Serbia) Barbara Bonić (Brazil) Nathaly Kurata
May 28	Niš, Serbia; Clay $15,000; Singles and doubles draws	(Australia) Masa Jovanovic (Australia) Jelena Stojanovic; 6–1, 7–6^{(7–2)}	(Romania) Gabriela Duca (Ukraine) Yuliya Lysa	(Greece) Despina Papamichail (Brazil) Eduarda Piai	(Czech Republic) Gabriela Pantůčková (Brazil) Rebeca Pereira (Serbia) Barbara Bonić (Brazil) Nathaly Kurata
May 28	Hammamet, Tunisia; Clay $15,000; Singles and doubles draws	(Slovenia) Pia Čuk; 7–5, 6–3	(Greece) Eleni Kordolaimi	(Belgium) Tamaryn Hendler (Germany) Katharina Hobgarski	(Belgium) Eliessa Vanlangendonck (France) Alice Ramé (Argentina) Paula Barañano (Netherlands) Merel Hoedt
May 28	Hammamet, Tunisia; Clay $15,000; Singles and doubles draws	(Greece) Eleni Kordolaimi (France) Alice Ramé; 6–2, 6–3	(Slovenia) Pia Čuk (Belgium) Eliessa Vanlangendonck	(Belgium) Tamaryn Hendler (Germany) Katharina Hobgarski	(Belgium) Eliessa Vanlangendonck (France) Alice Ramé (Argentina) Paula Barañano (Netherlands) Merel Hoedt
May 28	Antalya, Turkey; Clay $15,000; Singles and doubles draws	(Italy) Federica Bilardo; 6–1, 4–6, 6–1	(Bulgaria) Dia Evtimova	(Russia) Angelina Zhuravleva (Belgium) Greet Minnen	(Italy) Verena Meliss (Switzerland) Arlinda Rushiti (Bulgaria) Julia Stamatova (Turkey) Melis Sezer
May 28	Antalya, Turkey; Clay $15,000; Singles and doubles draws	(Bulgaria) Dia Evtimova (Russia) Angelina Zhuravleva; 7–5, 3–6, [14–12]	(Ukraine) Maryna Chernyshova (Turkey) Melis Sezer	(Russia) Angelina Zhuravleva (Belgium) Greet Minnen	(Italy) Verena Meliss (Switzerland) Arlinda Rushiti (Bulgaria) Julia Stamatova (Turkey) Melis Sezer

=== June ===
Week of	Tournament	Winner	Runners-up	Semifinalists	Quarterfinalists
June 4	Surbiton Trophy; Surbiton, United Kingdom; Grass $100,000; Singles – Doubles	(United States) Alison Riske; 6–2, 6–4	(Switzerland) Conny Perrin	(United Kingdom) Harriet Dart (Australia) Priscilla Hon	(United Kingdom) Gabriella Taylor (Belgium) Yanina Wickmayer (United Kingdom) Katie Boulter (United States) Kristie Ahn
June 4	Surbiton Trophy; Surbiton, United Kingdom; Grass $100,000; Singles – Doubles	(Australia) Jessica Moore (Australia) Ellen Perez; 4–6, 7–5, [10–3]	(Australia) Arina Rodionova (Belgium) Yanina Wickmayer	(United Kingdom) Harriet Dart (Australia) Priscilla Hon	(United Kingdom) Gabriella Taylor (Belgium) Yanina Wickmayer (United Kingdom) Katie Boulter (United States) Kristie Ahn
June 4	Internazionali Femminili di Brescia; Brescia, Italy; Clay $60,000; Singles – Doubles	(Estonia) Kaia Kanepi; 6–4, 6–3	(Italy) Martina Trevisan	(Italy) Anastasia Grymalska (United States) Francesca Di Lorenzo	(Georgia (country)) Ekaterine Gorgodze (Liechtenstein) Kathinka von Deichmann (Germany) Laura Siegemund (Romania) Alexandra Dulgheru
June 4	Internazionali Femminili di Brescia; Brescia, Italy; Clay $60,000; Singles – Doubles	(Romania) Cristina Dinu (Ukraine) Ganna Poznikhirenko; 6–3, 7–6^{(8–6)}	(Russia) Alexandra Panova (Russia) Anastasia Pribylova	(Italy) Anastasia Grymalska (United States) Francesca Di Lorenzo	(Georgia (country)) Ekaterine Gorgodze (Liechtenstein) Kathinka von Deichmann (Germany) Laura Siegemund (Romania) Alexandra Dulgheru
June 4	Changsha, China; Hard $25,000; Singles and doubles draws	(China) Han Xinyun; 7–5, 0–6, 6–4	(Australia) Alison Bai	(China) Guo Hanyu (China) Lu Jingjing	(China) Zhang Yuxuan (China) Xun Fangying (Japan) Erika Sema (China) Wei Zhanlan
June 4	Changsha, China; Hard $25,000; Singles and doubles draws	(China) Feng Shuo (China) Jiang Xinyu; 6–3, 4–6, [11–9]	(China) Han Xinyun (China) Zhang Ying	(China) Guo Hanyu (China) Lu Jingjing	(China) Zhang Yuxuan (China) Xun Fangying (Japan) Erika Sema (China) Wei Zhanlan
June 4	Staré Splavy, Czech Republic; Clay $25,000+H; Singles and doubles draws	(Czech Republic) Monika Kilnarová; 7–6^{(7–5)}, 6–3	(Slovakia) Rebecca Šramková	(Bulgaria) Elitsa Kostova (Bulgaria) Isabella Shinikova	(Croatia) Ani Mijačika (Poland) Maja Chwalińska (Belgium) Kimberley Zimmermann (Germany) Tayisiya Morderger
June 4	Staré Splavy, Czech Republic; Clay $25,000+H; Singles and doubles draws	(Russia) Maria Marfutina (Czech Republic) Anastasia Zarycká; 5–7, 6–1, [10–8]	(Czech Republic) Johana Marková (Germany) Sarah-Rebecca Sekulic	(Bulgaria) Elitsa Kostova (Bulgaria) Isabella Shinikova	(Croatia) Ani Mijačika (Poland) Maja Chwalińska (Belgium) Kimberley Zimmermann (Germany) Tayisiya Morderger
June 4	Óbidos, Portugal; Carpet $25,000; Singles and doubles draws	(Serbia) Dejana Radanović; 6–2, 6–1	(Italy) Giulia Gatto-Monticone	(Russia) Valeriya Solovyeva (Canada) Katherine Sebov	(Spain) Nuria Párrizas Díaz (Russia) Amina Anshba (Turkey) Berfu Cengiz (Georgia (country)) Sofia Shapatava
June 4	Óbidos, Portugal; Carpet $25,000; Singles and doubles draws	(Sweden) Linnéa Malmqvist (Italy) Angelica Moratelli; 7–5, 2–1, ret.	(Turkey) Berfu Cengiz (Australia) Sara Tomic	(Russia) Valeriya Solovyeva (Canada) Katherine Sebov	(Spain) Nuria Párrizas Díaz (Russia) Amina Anshba (Turkey) Berfu Cengiz (Georgia (country)) Sofia Shapatava
June 4	Singapore; Hard $25,000; Singles and doubles draws	(Japan) Hiroko Kuwata; 7–6^{(7–4)}, 6–0	(Serbia) Jovana Jakšić	(Japan) Misa Eguchi (Japan) Haruka Kaji	(Chinese Taipei) Lee Pei-chi (Japan) Mai Minokoshi (France) Priscilla Heise (South Korea) Kim Da-bin
June 4	Singapore; Hard $25,000; Singles and doubles draws	(Australia) Zoe Hives (Australia) Olivia Tjandramulia; 6–4, 4–6, [10–6]	(Japan) Miyabi Inoue (Japan) Junri Namigata	(Japan) Misa Eguchi (Japan) Haruka Kaji	(Chinese Taipei) Lee Pei-chi (Japan) Mai Minokoshi (France) Priscilla Heise (South Korea) Kim Da-bin
June 4	Hua Hin, Thailand; Hard $25,000; Singles and doubles draws	(Mexico) Victoria Rodríguez; 6–4, 6–1	(Israel) Julia Glushko	(India) Karman Thandi (Slovakia) Zuzana Zlochová	(China) Ma Shuyue (Japan) Risa Ozaki (Thailand) Peangtarn Plipuech (United States) Jacqueline Cako
June 4	Hua Hin, Thailand; Hard $25,000; Singles and doubles draws	(Mexico) Victoria Rodríguez (New Zealand) Erin Routliffe; 6–4, 6–4	(Japan) Mana Ayukawa (Switzerland) Nina Stadler	(India) Karman Thandi (Slovakia) Zuzana Zlochová	(China) Ma Shuyue (Japan) Risa Ozaki (Thailand) Peangtarn Plipuech (United States) Jacqueline Cako
June 4	Bethany Beach, United States; Clay $25,000; Singles and doubles draws	(United States) Grace Min; 6–4, 6–2	(United States) Katerina Stewart	(Romania) Gabriela Talabă (United States) Ashley Kratzer	(United States) Jessica Pegula (United States) Raveena Kingsley (United States) Robin Anderson (United States) Usue Maitane Arconada
June 4	Bethany Beach, United States; Clay $25,000; Singles and doubles draws	(United States) Robin Anderson (United States) Maegan Manasse; 2–6, 7–6^{(8–6)}, [10–3]	(United States) Quinn Gleason (United States) Sanaz Marand	(Romania) Gabriela Talabă (United States) Ashley Kratzer	(United States) Jessica Pegula (United States) Raveena Kingsley (United States) Robin Anderson (United States) Usue Maitane Arconada
June 4	Namangan, Uzbekistan; Hard $25,000; Singles and doubles draws	(Uzbekistan) Sabina Sharipova; 6–1, 6–1	(Belarus) Iryna Shymanovich	(Uzbekistan) Nigina Abduraimova (Slovenia) Kaja Juvan	(Russia) Anna Morgina (Bulgaria) Julia Terziyska (Russia) Olga Doroshina (Russia) Ksenia Lykina
June 4	Namangan, Uzbekistan; Hard $25,000; Singles and doubles draws	(Russia) Anastasia Gasanova (Russia) Ekaterina Yashina; 6–3, 6–1	(Russia) Anna Morgina (Bulgaria) Julia Terziyska	(Uzbekistan) Nigina Abduraimova (Slovenia) Kaja Juvan	(Russia) Anna Morgina (Bulgaria) Julia Terziyska (Russia) Olga Doroshina (Russia) Ksenia Lykina
June 4	Minsk, Belarus; Clay $15,000; Singles and doubles draws	(Belarus) Yuliya Hatouka; 4–6, 6–1, 6–0	(Belarus) Vlada Zvereva	(Czech Republic) Anna Sisková (Russia) Margarita Skryabina	(Turkey) Melis Sezer (Russia) Gyulnara Nazarova (Romania) Arina Gabriela Vasilescu (Russia) Daria Nazarkina
June 4	Minsk, Belarus; Clay $15,000; Singles and doubles draws	(Turkey) İpek Öz (Turkey) Melis Sezer; 6–1, 0–6, [10–8]	(Belarus) Anna Kubareva (Czech Republic) Anna Sisková	(Czech Republic) Anna Sisková (Russia) Margarita Skryabina	(Turkey) Melis Sezer (Russia) Gyulnara Nazarova (Romania) Arina Gabriela Vasilescu (Russia) Daria Nazarkina
June 4	Banja Luka, Bosnia and Herzegovina; Clay $15,000; Singles and doubles draws	(Czech Republic) Michaela Bayerlová; 6–2, 6–1	(Japan) Satsuki Takamura	(Ukraine) Marianna Zakarlyuk (Serbia) Milana Spremo	(Romania) Gabriela Duca (Slovakia) Jana Jablonovská (Croatia) Silvia Njirić (Turkey) Cemre Anıl
June 4	Banja Luka, Bosnia and Herzegovina; Clay $15,000; Singles and doubles draws	(Slovenia) Anja Gal (Slovenia) Sheila Glavaš; 7–6^{(7–5)}, 1–6, [10–6]	(Slovakia) Jana Jablonovská (Slovakia) Stella Kovačičová	(Ukraine) Marianna Zakarlyuk (Serbia) Milana Spremo	(Romania) Gabriela Duca (Slovakia) Jana Jablonovská (Croatia) Silvia Njirić (Turkey) Cemre Anıl
June 4	Tel Aviv, Israel; Hard $15,000; Singles and doubles draws	(Romania) Elena-Teodora Cadar; 3–6, 6–1, 6–4	(Israel) Nicole Nadel	(Belarus) Sadafmoh Tolibova (France) Fiona Codino	(Israel) Vlada Ekshibarova (Russia) Vasilisa Aponasenko (France) Lou Adler (Israel) Lina Glushko
June 4	Tel Aviv, Israel; Hard $15,000; Singles and doubles draws	(Romania) Elena-Teodora Cadar (Israel) Vlada Ekshibarova; 6–3, 3–6, [10–6]	(Israel) Shahar Biran (Czech Republic) Laetitia Pulchartová	(Belarus) Sadafmoh Tolibova (France) Fiona Codino	(Israel) Vlada Ekshibarova (Russia) Vasilisa Aponasenko (France) Lou Adler (Israel) Lina Glushko
June 4	Sangju, South Korea; Hard (indoor) $15,000; Singles and doubles draws	(Hong Kong) Wu Ho-ching; 7–5, 6–3	(Chinese Taipei) Lee Ya-hsuan	(China) Liu Chang (South Korea) Jeong Su-nam	(South Korea) Lee Eun-hye (Japan) Chisa Hosonuma (Japan) Kanako Morisaki (Japan) Ayaka Okuno
June 4	Sangju, South Korea; Hard (indoor) $15,000; Singles and doubles draws	(Chinese Taipei) Cho I-hsuan (China) Wang Danni; 7–5, 6–3	(Japan) Chisa Hosonuma (Japan) Kanako Morisaki	(China) Liu Chang (South Korea) Jeong Su-nam	(South Korea) Lee Eun-hye (Japan) Chisa Hosonuma (Japan) Kanako Morisaki (Japan) Ayaka Okuno
June 4	Madrid, Spain; Clay $15,000; Singles and doubles draws	(Italy) Giorgia Marchetti; 6–1, 2–6, 6–1	(France) Julie Gervais	(Spain) Guiomar Maristany (Spain) Marina Bassols Ribera	(France) Estelle Cascino (Spain) Ángela Fita Boluda (Spain) Noelia Bouzó Zanotti (Spain) María José Luque Moreno
June 4	Madrid, Spain; Clay $15,000; Singles and doubles draws	(France) Estelle Cascino (Italy) Giorgia Marchetti; 2–6, 6–4, [10–7]	(United States) Jessica Ho (Ukraine) Yuliya Lysa	(Spain) Guiomar Maristany (Spain) Marina Bassols Ribera	(France) Estelle Cascino (Spain) Ángela Fita Boluda (Spain) Noelia Bouzó Zanotti (Spain) María José Luque Moreno
June 4	Hammamet, Tunisia; Clay $15,000; Singles and doubles draws	(Greece) Eleni Kordolaimi; 6–1, 7–5	(France) Alice Ramé	(Italy) Verena Hofer (Slovenia) Pia Čuk	(Belgium) Eliessa Vanlangendonck (Italy) Veronica Napolitano (Spain) Claudia Hoste Ferrer (Algeria) Amira Benaïssa
June 4	Hammamet, Tunisia; Clay $15,000; Singles and doubles draws	(Greece) Eleni Kordolaimi (France) Alice Ramé; 6–2, 6–2	(Netherlands) Merel Hoedt (Belgium) Eliessa Vanlangendonck	(Italy) Verena Hofer (Slovenia) Pia Čuk	(Belgium) Eliessa Vanlangendonck (Italy) Veronica Napolitano (Spain) Claudia Hoste Ferrer (Algeria) Amira Benaïssa
June 4	Antalya, Turkey; Clay $15,000; Singles and doubles draws	(Ukraine) Daria Lopatetska; 6–2, 7–6^{(7–5)}	(Bulgaria) Julia Stamatova	(Russia) Angelina Zhuravleva (Belgium) Lara Salden	(India) Jennifer Luikham (Italy) Francesca Bullani (Turkey) İlay Yörük (Russia) Yulia Kulikova
June 4	Antalya, Turkey; Clay $15,000; Singles and doubles draws	(Russia) Yulia Kulikova (Russia) Anna Ureke; 6–4, 5–7, [10–6]	(Belgium) Margaux Bovy (Belgium) Lara Salden	(Russia) Angelina Zhuravleva (Belgium) Lara Salden	(India) Jennifer Luikham (Italy) Francesca Bullani (Turkey) İlay Yörük (Russia) Yulia Kulikova
June 11	Manchester Trophy; Manchester, United Kingdom; Grass $100,000; Singles – Doubles	(Tunisia) Ons Jabeur; 6–2, 6–1	(Spain) Sara Sorribes Tormo	(Russia) Evgeniya Rodina (Belgium) Ysaline Bonaventure	(Czech Republic) Marie Bouzková (Switzerland) Viktorija Golubic (Japan) Mayo Hibi (United Kingdom) Harriet Dart
June 11	Manchester Trophy; Manchester, United Kingdom; Grass $100,000; Singles – Doubles	(Thailand) Luksika Kumkhum (India) Prarthana Thombare; 7–6^{(7–5)}, 6–3	(United Kingdom) Naomi Broady (United States) Asia Muhammad	(Russia) Evgeniya Rodina (Belgium) Ysaline Bonaventure	(Czech Republic) Marie Bouzková (Switzerland) Viktorija Golubic (Japan) Mayo Hibi (United Kingdom) Harriet Dart
June 11	Hódmezővásárhely Ladies Open; Hódmezővásárhely, Hungary; Clay $60,000; Singles – Doubles	(Colombia) Mariana Duque Mariño; 4–6, 7–5, 6–2	(Romania) Irina Bara	(Turkey) Çağla Büyükakçay (Russia) Irina Khromacheva	(Russia) Valentyna Ivakhnenko (Ukraine) Anhelina Kalinina (Ukraine) Katarina Zavatska (Serbia) Nina Stojanović
June 11	Hódmezővásárhely Ladies Open; Hódmezővásárhely, Hungary; Clay $60,000; Singles – Doubles	(Hungary) Réka Luca Jani (Argentina) Nadia Podoroska; 6–4, 6–4	(Montenegro) Danka Kovinić (Serbia) Nina Stojanović	(Turkey) Çağla Büyükakçay (Russia) Irina Khromacheva	(Russia) Valentyna Ivakhnenko (Ukraine) Anhelina Kalinina (Ukraine) Katarina Zavatska (Serbia) Nina Stojanović
June 11	Bredeney Ladies Open; Essen, Germany; Clay $25,000; Singles and doubles draws	(Luxembourg) Mandy Minella; 7–5, 4–6, 6–4	(Netherlands) Cindy Burger	(Turkey) Pemra Özgen (Germany) Lena Rüffer	(Belgium) Kimberley Zimmermann (Brazil) Nathaly Kurata (Turkey) Başak Eraydın (Japan) Yuki Naito
June 11	Bredeney Ladies Open; Essen, Germany; Clay $25,000; Singles and doubles draws	(Germany) Katharina Gerlach (Germany) Julia Wachaczyk; 6–4, 2–6, [10–6]	(Latvia) Diāna Marcinkēviča (South Africa) Chanel Simmonds	(Turkey) Pemra Özgen (Germany) Lena Rüffer	(Belgium) Kimberley Zimmermann (Brazil) Nathaly Kurata (Turkey) Başak Eraydın (Japan) Yuki Naito
June 11	Padua, Italy; Clay $25,000; Singles and doubles draws	(France) Fiona Ferro; 7–5, 6–3	(Russia) Liudmila Samsonova	(Italy) Martina Di Giuseppe (Italy) Georgia Brescia	(Slovenia) Tamara Zidanšek (Croatia) Tereza Mrdeža (Brazil) Gabriela Cé (Italy) Tatiana Pieri
June 11	Padua, Italy; Clay $25,000; Singles and doubles draws	(Turkey) İpek Soylu (Czech Republic) Anastasia Zarycká; 6–4, 6–1	(Bosnia and Herzegovina) Dea Herdželaš (Croatia) Tereza Mrdeža	(Italy) Martina Di Giuseppe (Italy) Georgia Brescia	(Slovenia) Tamara Zidanšek (Croatia) Tereza Mrdeža (Brazil) Gabriela Cé (Italy) Tatiana Pieri
June 11	Kōfu, Japan; Hard $25,000; Singles and doubles draws	(Japan) Misaki Doi; 6–2, 6–3	(Japan) Lisa-Marie Rioux	(Japan) Shiori Fukuda (Japan) Mai Hontama	(Japan) Ayano Shimizu (Japan) Naho Sato (Chinese Taipei) Chang Kai-chen (Japan) Momoko Kobori
June 11	Kōfu, Japan; Hard $25,000; Singles and doubles draws	(Japan) Misaki Doi (Japan) Misa Eguchi; 6–3, 6–7^{(2–7)}, [10–8]	(Japan) Megumi Nishimoto (Japan) Kotomi Takahata	(Japan) Shiori Fukuda (Japan) Mai Hontama	(Japan) Ayano Shimizu (Japan) Naho Sato (Chinese Taipei) Chang Kai-chen (Japan) Momoko Kobori
June 11	Óbidos, Portugal; Carpet $25,000; Singles and doubles draws	(Serbia) Dejana Radanović; 6–3, 6–3	(Spain) Nuria Párrizas Díaz	(Turkey) Berfu Cengiz (New Zealand) Lulu Sun	(Argentina) Victoria Bosio (Italy) Giulia Gatto-Monticone (Switzerland) Lisa Sabino (Spain) Rosa Vicens Mas
June 11	Óbidos, Portugal; Carpet $25,000; Singles and doubles draws	(Italy) Giulia Gatto-Monticone (Italy) Giorgia Marchetti; 6–1, 6–1	(Spain) Nuria Párrizas Díaz (Germany) Caroline Werner	(Turkey) Berfu Cengiz (New Zealand) Lulu Sun	(Argentina) Victoria Bosio (Italy) Giulia Gatto-Monticone (Switzerland) Lisa Sabino (Spain) Rosa Vicens Mas
June 11	Singapore; Hard $25,000; Singles and doubles draws	(Israel) Julia Glushko; 1–6, 6–1, 6–4	(Japan) Risa Ozaki	(Japan) Junri Namigata (Japan) Haruka Kaji	(France) Tessah Andrianjafitrimo (South Korea) Han Na-lae (South Korea) Choi Ji-hee (Japan) Hiroko Kuwata
June 11	Singapore; Hard $25,000; Singles and doubles draws	(Japan) Haruka Kaji (Japan) Akiko Omae; 7–5, 6–2	(South Korea) Han Na-lae (South Korea) Lee So-ra	(Japan) Junri Namigata (Japan) Haruka Kaji	(France) Tessah Andrianjafitrimo (South Korea) Han Na-lae (South Korea) Choi Ji-hee (Japan) Hiroko Kuwata
June 11	Barcelona Women World Winner; Barcelona, Spain; Clay $25,000; Singles and doubles draws	(Spain) Estrella Cabeza Candela; 6–2, 6–3	(Spain) Aliona Bolsova Zadoinov	(France) Sara Cakarevic (Spain) Olga Sáez Larra	(Finland) Mia Eklund (Spain) Eva Guerrero Álvarez (Spain) Guiomar Maristany (France) Myrtille Georges
June 11	Barcelona Women World Winner; Barcelona, Spain; Clay $25,000; Singles and doubles draws	(United States) Jessica Ho (China) Wang Xiyu; 6–3, 6–1	(Brazil) Carolina Alves (France) Jade Suvrijn	(France) Sara Cakarevic (Spain) Olga Sáez Larra	(Finland) Mia Eklund (Spain) Eva Guerrero Álvarez (Spain) Guiomar Maristany (France) Myrtille Georges
June 11	Sumter, United States; Hard $25,000; Singles and doubles draws	(United States) Taylor Townsend; Walkover	(France) Alizé Lim	(United States) Gail Brodsky (United States) Ashley Lahey	(United States) Maria Mateas (United States) Hailey Baptiste (Mexico) Marcela Zacarías (United States) Robin Anderson
June 11	Sumter, United States; Hard $25,000; Singles and doubles draws	(Australia) Astra Sharma (Brazil) Luisa Stefani; 2–6, 6–3, [10–5]	(United States) Julia Elbaba (China) Xu Shilin	(United States) Gail Brodsky (United States) Ashley Lahey	(United States) Maria Mateas (United States) Hailey Baptiste (Mexico) Marcela Zacarías (United States) Robin Anderson
June 11	Minsk, Belarus; Clay $15,000; Singles and doubles draws	(Belarus) Katyarina Paulenka; 6–4, 6–3	(Belgium) Margaux Bovy	(Turkey) İpek Öz (Belarus) Shalimar Talbi	(Estonia) Elena Malõgina (Belarus) Anna Kubareva (Russia) Polina Bakhmutkina (Russia) Valeriya Yushchenko
June 11	Minsk, Belarus; Clay $15,000; Singles and doubles draws	(Turkey) İpek Öz (Turkey) Melis Sezer; 6–2, 4–6, [10–5]	(Belgium) Margaux Bovy (Russia) Angelina Zhuravleva	(Turkey) İpek Öz (Belarus) Shalimar Talbi	(Estonia) Elena Malõgina (Belarus) Anna Kubareva (Russia) Polina Bakhmutkina (Russia) Valeriya Yushchenko
June 11	Přerov, Czech Republic; Clay $15,000; Singles and doubles draws	(Czech Republic) Gabriela Pantůčková; 6–4, 6–0	(Czech Republic) Magdaléna Pantůčková	(Czech Republic) Diana Šumová (Russia) Maria Marfutina	(Belgium) Tamaryn Hendler (Russia) Yulia Kulikova (Czech Republic) Kateřina Vaňková (Slovakia) Jana Jablonovská
June 11	Přerov, Czech Republic; Clay $15,000; Singles and doubles draws	(Slovakia) Jana Jablonovská (Slovakia) Lenka Juríková; 2–6, 6–1, [10–6]	(Czech Republic) Karolína Kubáňová (Czech Republic) Laetitia Pulchartová	(Czech Republic) Diana Šumová (Russia) Maria Marfutina	(Belgium) Tamaryn Hendler (Russia) Yulia Kulikova (Czech Republic) Kateřina Vaňková (Slovakia) Jana Jablonovská
June 11	Infond Open; Maribor, Slovenia; Clay $15,000; Singles and doubles draws	(France) Irina Ramialison; 6–2, 6–7^{(3–7)}, 7–5	(China) Wang Xinyu	(Austria) Pia König (Russia) Victoria Kan	(Germany) Lara Schmidt (Australia) Nina Alibalić (Czech Republic) Michaela Bayerlová (Japan) Satsuki Takamura
June 11	Infond Open; Maribor, Slovenia; Clay $15,000; Singles and doubles draws	(Czech Republic) Michaela Bayerlová (Kosovo) Adrijana Lekaj; 7–6^{(7–2)}, 7–5	(France) Irina Ramialison (France) Constance Sibille	(Austria) Pia König (Russia) Victoria Kan	(Germany) Lara Schmidt (Australia) Nina Alibalić (Czech Republic) Michaela Bayerlová (Japan) Satsuki Takamura
June 11	Gyeongsan, South Korea; Hard $15,000; Singles and doubles draws	(United States) Hanna Chang; 6–4, 6–2	(Japan) Eri Shimizu	(Japan) Satsuki Koike (Hong Kong) Wu Ho-ching	(South Korea) Yea Hyo-jung (Kazakhstan) Zhibek Kulambayeva (South Korea) Jeong Su-nam (China) Liu Chang
June 11	Gyeongsan, South Korea; Hard $15,000; Singles and doubles draws	(South Korea) Kim Mi-ok (South Korea) Yu Min-hwa; 6–2, 1–6, [10–5]	(South Korea) Jung So-hee (South Korea) Park Sang-hee	(Japan) Satsuki Koike (Hong Kong) Wu Ho-ching	(South Korea) Yea Hyo-jung (Kazakhstan) Zhibek Kulambayeva (South Korea) Jeong Su-nam (China) Liu Chang
June 11	Hammamet, Tunisia; Clay $15,000; Singles and doubles draws	(Chile) Fernanda Brito; 6–2, ret.	(Germany) Natalia Siedliska	(France) Mallaurie Noël (Spain) Claudia Hoste Ferrer	(Netherlands) Merel Hoedt (Japan) Yuka Hosoki (Switzerland) Jessica Crivelletto (Argentina) Sofía Luini
June 11	Hammamet, Tunisia; Clay $15,000; Singles and doubles draws	(Chile) Fernanda Brito (Argentina) Sofía Luini; 6–3, 6–2	(Spain) Claudia Hoste Ferrer (France) Elixane Lechemia	(France) Mallaurie Noël (Spain) Claudia Hoste Ferrer	(Netherlands) Merel Hoedt (Japan) Yuka Hosoki (Switzerland) Jessica Crivelletto (Argentina) Sofía Luini
June 18	Ilkley Trophy; Ilkley, United Kingdom; Grass $100,000; Singles – Doubles	(Czech Republic) Tereza Smitková; 7–6^{(7–2)}, 3–6, 7–6^{(7–4)}	(Ukraine) Dayana Yastremska	(Russia) Ekaterina Alexandrova (Papua New Guinea) Abigail Tere-Apisah	(Estonia) Kaia Kanepi (United Kingdom) Harriet Dart (Tunisia) Ons Jabeur (Russia) Evgeniya Rodina
June 18	Ilkley Trophy; Ilkley, United Kingdom; Grass $100,000; Singles – Doubles	(United States) Asia Muhammad (United States) Maria Sanchez; 4–6, 6–3, [10–1]	(Russia) Natela Dzalamidze (Kazakhstan) Galina Voskoboeva	(Russia) Ekaterina Alexandrova (Papua New Guinea) Abigail Tere-Apisah	(Estonia) Kaia Kanepi (United Kingdom) Harriet Dart (Tunisia) Ons Jabeur (Russia) Evgeniya Rodina
June 18	Open Montpellier Méditerranée Métropole Hérault; Montpellier, France; Clay $25,000+H; Singles and doubles draws	(France) Fiona Ferro; 6–4, 6–3	(Argentina) Catalina Pella	(France) Shérazad Reix (France) Audrey Albié	(Italy) Cristiana Ferrando (France) Jessika Ponchet (France) Jade Suvrijn (France) Marine Partaud
June 18	Open Montpellier Méditerranée Métropole Hérault; Montpellier, France; Clay $25,000+H; Singles and doubles draws	(France) Elixane Lechemia (France) Alice Ramé; 6–7^{(5–7)}, 6–2, [10–6]	(Brazil) Carolina Alves (Italy) Martina Colmegna	(France) Shérazad Reix (France) Audrey Albié	(Italy) Cristiana Ferrando (France) Jessika Ponchet (France) Jade Suvrijn (France) Marine Partaud
June 18	Hong Kong; Hard $25,000; Singles and doubles draws	(India) Karman Thandi; 6–1, 6–2	(China) Lu Jiajing	(Hong Kong) Eudice Chong (Slovakia) Zuzana Zlochová	(France) Victoria Muntean (Japan) Mai Minokoshi (Serbia) Jovana Jakšić (Japan) Mai Hontama
June 18	Hong Kong; Hard $25,000; Singles and doubles draws	(Chinese Taipei) Lee Pei-chi (Indonesia) Jessy Rompies; 6–3, 6–4	(France) Victoria Muntean (India) Pranjala Yadlapalli	(Hong Kong) Eudice Chong (Slovakia) Zuzana Zlochová	(France) Victoria Muntean (Japan) Mai Minokoshi (Serbia) Jovana Jakšić (Japan) Mai Hontama
June 18	Daegu, South Korea; Hard $25,000; Singles and doubles draws	(South Korea) Han Na-lae; 5–2, ret.	(Japan) Misaki Doi	(Chinese Taipei) Hsu Ching-wen (Chinese Taipei) Chang Kai-chen	(South Korea) Jang Su-jeong (South Korea) Kim Na-ri (Australia) Olivia Tjandramulia (United States) Hanna Chang
June 18	Daegu, South Korea; Hard $25,000; Singles and doubles draws	(Chinese Taipei) Chang Kai-chen (Chinese Taipei) Hsu Ching-wen; 2–1, ret.	(Japan) Shiho Akita (Japan) Misaki Doi	(Chinese Taipei) Hsu Ching-wen (Chinese Taipei) Chang Kai-chen	(South Korea) Jang Su-jeong (South Korea) Kim Na-ri (Australia) Olivia Tjandramulia (United States) Hanna Chang
June 18	Madrid, Spain; Clay (indoor) $25,000; Singles and doubles draws	(France) Amandine Hesse; 7–6^{(7–3)}, 4–6, 7–5	(Italy) Martina Di Giuseppe	(Spain) Sílvia Soler Espinosa (Spain) Guiomar Maristany	(Spain) Marina Bassols Ribera (Paraguay) Montserrat González (Argentina) Nadia Podoroska (China) Wang Xiyu
June 18	Madrid, Spain; Clay (indoor) $25,000; Singles and doubles draws	(Paraguay) Montserrat González (China) Wang Xiyu; 6–4, 7–6^{(7–4)}	(Russia) Anastasia Pribylova (Romania) Raluca Georgiana Șerban	(Spain) Sílvia Soler Espinosa (Spain) Guiomar Maristany	(Spain) Marina Bassols Ribera (Paraguay) Montserrat González (Argentina) Nadia Podoroska (China) Wang Xiyu
June 18	Ystad, Sweden; Clay $25,000; Singles and doubles draws	(Slovenia) Kaja Juvan; 2–6, 7–5, 6–1	(Romania) Andreea Amalia Roșca	(Romania) Irina Bara (Kazakhstan) Anna Danilina	(Poland) Katarzyna Kawa (Germany) Romy Kölzer (Belgium) Marie Benoît (Norway) Ulrikke Eikeri
June 18	Ystad, Sweden; Clay $25,000; Singles and doubles draws	(United Kingdom) Emily Arbuthnott (Denmark) Emilie Francati; 6–2, 6–1	(Chinese Taipei) Chen Pei-hsuan (Chinese Taipei) Wu Fang-hsien	(Romania) Irina Bara (Kazakhstan) Anna Danilina	(Poland) Katarzyna Kawa (Germany) Romy Kölzer (Belgium) Marie Benoît (Norway) Ulrikke Eikeri
June 18	Klosters, Switzerland; Clay $25,000; Singles and doubles draws	(Czech Republic) Miriam Kolodziejová; 5–7, 6–4, 6–1	(Bulgaria) Isabella Shinikova	(Switzerland) Leonie Küng (Luxembourg) Mandy Minella	(Germany) Sarah-Rebecca Sekulic (Switzerland) Simona Waltert (Japan) Yuki Naito (Italy) Georgia Brescia
June 18	Klosters, Switzerland; Clay $25,000; Singles and doubles draws	(Uzbekistan) Akgul Amanmuradova (Georgia (country)) Ekaterine Gorgodze; 6–2, 6–3	(Czech Republic) Lucie Hradecká (Japan) Yuki Naito	(Switzerland) Leonie Küng (Luxembourg) Mandy Minella	(Germany) Sarah-Rebecca Sekulic (Switzerland) Simona Waltert (Japan) Yuki Naito (Italy) Georgia Brescia
June 18	Baton Rouge, United States; Hard $25,000; Singles and doubles draws	(Australia) Astra Sharma; 6–2, 6–1	(United States) Maria Mateas	(Russia) Nika Kukharchuk (United States) Ashley Lahey	(United States) Julia Elbaba (United States) Connie Ma (New Zealand) Paige Mary Hourigan (United States) Sanaz Marand
June 18	Baton Rouge, United States; Hard $25,000; Singles and doubles draws	(United States) Hayley Carter (United States) Ena Shibahara; 6–3, 6–4	(Australia) Astra Sharma (Romania) Gabriela Talabă	(Russia) Nika Kukharchuk (United States) Ashley Lahey	(United States) Julia Elbaba (United States) Connie Ma (New Zealand) Paige Mary Hourigan (United States) Sanaz Marand
June 18	Fergana Challenger; Fergana, Uzbekistan; Hard $25,000; Singles and doubles draws	(Uzbekistan) Nigina Abduraimova; 6–3, 2–0 ret.	(Russia) Anastasia Frolova	(Uzbekistan) Guzal Yusupova (Russia) Varvara Flink	(Uzbekistan) Sabina Sharipova (Russia) Sofya Lansere (Slovenia) Nastja Kolar (Russia) Olga Doroshina
June 18	Fergana Challenger; Fergana, Uzbekistan; Hard $25,000; Singles and doubles draws	(Russia) Anastasia Frolova (Russia) Ekaterina Yashina; 6–1, 7–6^{(7–4)}	(Russia) Sofya Lansere (Russia) Kamilla Rakhimova	(Uzbekistan) Guzal Yusupova (Russia) Varvara Flink	(Uzbekistan) Sabina Sharipova (Russia) Sofya Lansere (Slovenia) Nastja Kolar (Russia) Olga Doroshina
June 18	Victoria, Canada; Hard (indoor) $15,000; Singles and doubles draws	(United States) Gail Brodsky; 3–6, 6–2, 6–3	(United States) Maegan Manasse	(United States) Alexa Graham (United States) Pamela Montez	(United States) Amanda Rodgers (Canada) Layne Sleeth (United States) Brynn Boren (United States) Lorraine Guillermo
June 18	Victoria, Canada; Hard (indoor) $15,000; Singles and doubles draws	(United States) Brynn Boren (United States) Gail Brodsky; 6–1, 6–2	(United States) Safiya Carrington (United States) Alana Smith	(United States) Alexa Graham (United States) Pamela Montez	(United States) Amanda Rodgers (Canada) Layne Sleeth (United States) Brynn Boren (United States) Lorraine Guillermo
June 18	Kaltenkirchen, Germany; Clay $15,000; Singles and doubles draws	(Germany) Jule Niemeier; 7–5, 6–2	(Israel) Vlada Ekshibarova	(Germany) Anna Gabric (Germany) Chantal Sauvant	(Germany) Mina Hodzic (Russia) Yulia Kulikova (Germany) Anna Klasen (Germany) Lisa Ponomar
June 18	Kaltenkirchen, Germany; Clay $15,000; Singles and doubles draws	(Germany) Anna Gabric (Germany) Katharina Gerlach; 6–2, 5–7, [10–8]	(Israel) Vlada Ekshibarova (Belarus) Sviatlana Pirazhenka	(Germany) Anna Gabric (Germany) Chantal Sauvant	(Germany) Mina Hodzic (Russia) Yulia Kulikova (Germany) Anna Klasen (Germany) Lisa Ponomar
June 18	Kiryat Shmona, Israel; Hard $15,000; Singles and doubles draws	(Israel) Maya Tahan; 7–6^{(7–3)}, 7–5	(Israel) Nicole Nadel	(Israel) Shahar Biran (Croatia) Katja Milaš	(Romania) Elena-Teodora Cadar (Australia) Alexandra Walters (France) Fiona Codino (Israel) Shelly Bereznyak
June 18	Kiryat Shmona, Israel; Hard $15,000; Singles and doubles draws	(Poland) Paulina Jastrzębska (United Kingdom) Tiffany William; 7–5, 2–6, [17–15]	(Romania) Elena-Teodora Cadar (Australia) Alexandra Walters	(Israel) Shahar Biran (Croatia) Katja Milaš	(Romania) Elena-Teodora Cadar (Australia) Alexandra Walters (France) Fiona Codino (Israel) Shelly Bereznyak
June 18	Sassuolo, Italy; Clay $15,000; Singles and doubles draws	(Italy) Angelica Moratelli; 6–4, 6–3	(Germany) Anne Schäfer	(Switzerland) Susan Bandecchi (Hungary) Vanda Lukács	(United States) Alexa Noel (Italy) Monica Cappelletti (Italy) Giorgia Marchetti (Brazil) Gabriela Cé
June 18	Sassuolo, Italy; Clay $15,000; Singles and doubles draws	(Croatia) Mariana Dražić (Italy) Maria Masini; 6–4, 6–2	(Serbia) Mihaela Đaković (Italy) Beatrice Torelli	(Switzerland) Susan Bandecchi (Hungary) Vanda Lukács	(United States) Alexa Noel (Italy) Monica Cappelletti (Italy) Giorgia Marchetti (Brazil) Gabriela Cé
June 18	Amarante, Portugal; Hard $15,000; Singles and doubles draws	(Spain) Alba Carrillo Marín; 6–3, 6–2	(Romania) Cristina Ene	(Zimbabwe) Valeria Bhunu (France) Lou Brouleau	(India) Snehadevi Reddy (France) Théo Gravouil (United States) Madison Westby (Ukraine) Marianna Zakarlyuk
June 18	Amarante, Portugal; Hard $15,000; Singles and doubles draws	(Spain) Alba Carrillo Marín (Portugal) Inês Murta; 6–4, 6–2	(Romania) Karola Patricia Bejenaru (Portugal) Daniella Silva	(Zimbabwe) Valeria Bhunu (France) Lou Brouleau	(India) Snehadevi Reddy (France) Théo Gravouil (United States) Madison Westby (Ukraine) Marianna Zakarlyuk
June 18	Hammamet, Tunisia; Clay $15,000; Singles and doubles draws	(Chile) Fernanda Brito; 6–4, 6–2	(Germany) Katharina Hobgarski	(Spain) Irene Burillo Escorihuela (Bulgaria) Julia Stamatova	(Algeria) Inès Ibbou (Spain) Claudia Hoste Ferrer (Italy) Verena Hofer (Romania) Andreea Velcea
June 18	Hammamet, Tunisia; Clay $15,000; Singles and doubles draws	(Argentina) Paula Barañano (Chile) Fernanda Brito; 7–6^{(7–5)}, 6–4	(Spain) Irene Burillo Escorihuela (Spain) Claudia Hoste Ferrer	(Spain) Irene Burillo Escorihuela (Bulgaria) Julia Stamatova	(Algeria) Inès Ibbou (Spain) Claudia Hoste Ferrer (Italy) Verena Hofer (Romania) Andreea Velcea
June 25	Southsea Trophy; Southsea, United Kingdom; Grass $100,000+H; Singles – Doubles	(Belgium) Kirsten Flipkens; 6–4, 5–7, 6–3	(United Kingdom) Katie Boulter	(United States) Jennifer Brady (France) Pauline Parmentier	(Poland) Magda Linette (Slovakia) Anna Karolína Schmiedlová (Czech Republic) Renata Voráčová (Belarus) Vera Lapko
June 25	Southsea Trophy; Southsea, United Kingdom; Grass $100,000+H; Singles – Doubles	(Belgium) Kirsten Flipkens (Sweden) Johanna Larsson; 6–4, 3–6, [11–9]	(Poland) Alicja Rosolska (United States) Abigail Spears	(United States) Jennifer Brady (France) Pauline Parmentier	(Poland) Magda Linette (Slovakia) Anna Karolína Schmiedlová (Czech Republic) Renata Voráčová (Belarus) Vera Lapko
June 25	Périgueux, France; Clay $25,000; Singles and doubles draws	(Argentina) Nadia Podoroska; 6–2, 6–0	(France) Myrtille Georges	(France) Sara Cakarevic (Spain) Olga Sáez Larra	(Japan) Mari Osaka (Russia) Varvara Gracheva (France) Julie Gervais (France) Chloé Paquet
June 25	Périgueux, France; Clay $25,000; Singles and doubles draws	(Greece) Eleni Kordolaimi (France) Elixane Lechemia; 6–4, 3–6, [11–9]	(Spain) Cristina Bucșa (Colombia) María Fernanda Herazo	(France) Sara Cakarevic (Spain) Olga Sáez Larra	(Japan) Mari Osaka (Russia) Varvara Gracheva (France) Julie Gervais (France) Chloé Paquet
June 25	Stuttgart, Germany; Clay $25,000; Singles and doubles draws	(Luxembourg) Mandy Minella; 6–4, 4–6, 6–1	(Germany) Anna Zaja	(Hungary) Dalma Gálfi (Belgium) Marie Benoît	(Turkey) Pemra Özgen (Romania) Raluca Georgiana Șerban (Spain) Yvonne Cavallé Reimers (Luxembourg) Eléonora Molinaro
June 25	Stuttgart, Germany; Clay $25,000; Singles and doubles draws	(Romania) Irina Fetecău (Venezuela) Aymet Uzcátegui; 6–2, 3–6, [10–4]	(Bosnia and Herzegovina) Anita Husarić (Australia) Tammi Patterson	(Hungary) Dalma Gálfi (Belgium) Marie Benoît	(Turkey) Pemra Özgen (Romania) Raluca Georgiana Șerban (Spain) Yvonne Cavallé Reimers (Luxembourg) Eléonora Molinaro
June 25	Bella Cup; Toruń, Poland; Clay $25,000+H; Singles and doubles draws	(Czech Republic) Barbora Krejčíková; 7–5, 6–1	(Slovakia) Rebecca Šramková	(Poland) Katarzyna Kawa (Russia) Ksenia Laskutova	(Russia) Marina Melnikova (Poland) Maja Chwalińska (Russia) Sofya Golubovskaya (Slovakia) Michaela Hončová
June 25	Bella Cup; Toruń, Poland; Clay $25,000+H; Singles and doubles draws	(Poland) Maja Chwalińska (Poland) Katarzyna Kawa; 6–1, 6–4	(Uzbekistan) Albina Khabibulina (Belgium) Hélène Scholsen	(Poland) Katarzyna Kawa (Russia) Ksenia Laskutova	(Russia) Marina Melnikova (Poland) Maja Chwalińska (Russia) Sofya Golubovskaya (Slovakia) Michaela Hončová
June 25	Båstad, Sweden; Clay $25,000; Singles and doubles draws	(United States) Allie Kiick; 6–2, 6–1	(Bulgaria) Isabella Shinikova	(Norway) Ulrikke Eikeri (Sweden) Mirjam Björklund	(Greece) Despina Papamichail (Slovenia) Kaja Juvan (Italy) Giulia Gatto-Monticone (Italy) Martina Colmegna
June 25	Båstad, Sweden; Clay $25,000; Singles and doubles draws	(Chinese Taipei) Chen Pei-hsuan (Chinese Taipei) Wu Fang-hsien; 7–5, 1–6, [10–5]	(Kazakhstan) Anna Danilina (Switzerland) Karin Kennel	(Norway) Ulrikke Eikeri (Sweden) Mirjam Björklund	(Greece) Despina Papamichail (Slovenia) Kaja Juvan (Italy) Giulia Gatto-Monticone (Italy) Martina Colmegna
June 25	Jablonec nad Nisou, Czech Republic; Clay $15,000; Singles and doubles draws	(Russia) Victoria Kan; 6–4, 6–1	(Czech Republic) Magdaléna Pantůčková	(Czech Republic) Petra Krejsová (Czech Republic) Gabriela Pantůčková	(Czech Republic) Johana Marková (Russia) Anastasia Kharitonova (Czech Republic) Michaela Bayerlová (Poland) Marta Leśniak
June 25	Jablonec nad Nisou, Czech Republic; Clay $15,000; Singles and doubles draws	(Czech Republic) Michaela Bayerlová (Germany) Eva Marie Voracek; 7–5, 4–6, [13–11]	(Czech Republic) Radka Bužková (Czech Republic) Aneta Laboutková	(Czech Republic) Petra Krejsová (Czech Republic) Gabriela Pantůčková	(Czech Republic) Johana Marková (Russia) Anastasia Kharitonova (Czech Republic) Michaela Bayerlová (Poland) Marta Leśniak
June 25	Tarvisio, Italy; Clay $15,000; Singles and doubles draws	(Switzerland) Lisa Sabino; 6–3, 6–3	(Brazil) Thaisa Grana Pedretti	(Hungary) Réka Luca Jani (Slovenia) Kristina Novak	(Italy) Camilla Scala (Italy) Dalila Spiteri (Croatia) Ena Kajević (Italy) Monica Cappelletti
June 25	Tarvisio, Italy; Clay $15,000; Singles and doubles draws	(Italy) Camilla Abbate (Czech Republic) Laetitia Pulchartová; Walkover	(Italy) Maria Masini (Italy) Dalila Spiteri	(Hungary) Réka Luca Jani (Slovenia) Kristina Novak	(Italy) Camilla Scala (Italy) Dalila Spiteri (Croatia) Ena Kajević (Italy) Monica Cappelletti
June 25	Alkmaar, Netherlands; Clay $15,000; Singles and doubles draws	(Sweden) Marina Yudanov; 6–0, 6–2	(Belgium) Greet Minnen	(Belgium) Tamaryn Hendler (Croatia) Oleksandra Oliynykova	(Germany) Julyette Steur (Austria) Marlies Szupper (Netherlands) Dominique Karregat (Germany) Shaline-Doreen Pipa
June 25	Alkmaar, Netherlands; Clay $15,000; Singles and doubles draws	(Netherlands) Annick Melgers (Sweden) Marina Yudanov; 7–6^{(8–6)}, 6–4	(Germany) Franziska Kommer (Germany) Linda Puppendahl	(Belgium) Tamaryn Hendler (Croatia) Oleksandra Oliynykova	(Germany) Julyette Steur (Austria) Marlies Szupper (Netherlands) Dominique Karregat (Germany) Shaline-Doreen Pipa
June 25	Guimarães, Portugal; Hard $15,000; Singles and doubles draws	(Portugal) Maria João Koehler; 6–1, 3–6, 6–1	(India) Zeel Desai	(Japan) Yuriko Lily Miyazaki (Sweden) Jacqueline Cabaj Awad	(Spain) Alba Carrillo Marín (France) Théo Gravouil (Brazil) Alice Garcia (France) Mathilde Armitano
June 25	Guimarães, Portugal; Hard $15,000; Singles and doubles draws	(Romania) Karola Patricia Bejenaru (Sweden) Jacqueline Cabaj Awad; 6–1, 6–0	(India) Zeel Desai (Romania) Cristina Ene	(Japan) Yuriko Lily Miyazaki (Sweden) Jacqueline Cabaj Awad	(Spain) Alba Carrillo Marín (France) Théo Gravouil (Brazil) Alice Garcia (France) Mathilde Armitano
June 25	Curtea de Argeș, Romania; Clay $15,000; Singles and doubles draws	(Romania) Miriam Bianca Bulgaru; 6–4, 7–5	(Romania) Andreea Mitu	(Romania) Oana Georgeta Simion (United States) Elizabeth Mandlik	(Romania) Ilona Georgiana Ghioroaie (Bulgaria) Gebriela Mihaylova (Romania) Georgia Crăciun (Italy) Bianca Turati
June 25	Curtea de Argeș, Romania; Clay $15,000; Singles and doubles draws	(United States) Elizabeth Mandlik (Romania) Andreea Mitu; 6–4, 7–5	(Italy) Anna Turati (Italy) Bianca Turati	(Romania) Oana Georgeta Simion (United States) Elizabeth Mandlik	(Romania) Ilona Georgiana Ghioroaie (Bulgaria) Gebriela Mihaylova (Romania) Georgia Crăciun (Italy) Bianca Turati
June 25	Verbier, Switzerland; Clay $15,000; Singles and doubles draws	(Switzerland) Fiona Ganz; 3–6, 6–1, 6–4	(Switzerland) Nina Stadler	(Switzerland) Svenja Ochsner (Switzerland) Alina Granwehr	(Italy) Federica Di Sarra (Switzerland) Sandy Marti (Switzerland) Tess Sugnaux (France) Diana Martynov
June 25	Verbier, Switzerland; Clay $15,000; Singles and doubles draws	(Czech Republic) Gabriela Horáčková (Switzerland) Nina Stadler; 7–6^{(7–5)}, 6–7^{(3–7)}, [10–7]	(Italy) Martina Caregaro (Italy) Federica Di Sarra	(Switzerland) Svenja Ochsner (Switzerland) Alina Granwehr	(Italy) Federica Di Sarra (Switzerland) Sandy Marti (Switzerland) Tess Sugnaux (France) Diana Martynov
June 25	Hammamet, Tunisia; Clay $15,000; Singles and doubles draws	(Chile) Fernanda Brito; 6–1, 6–0	(Spain) Andrea Lázaro García	(Guatemala) Melissa Morales (Czech Republic) Anna Sisková	(Netherlands) Merel Hoedt (Serbia) Draginja Vuković (Italy) Verena Hofer (Spain) Irene Burillo Escorihuela
June 25	Hammamet, Tunisia; Clay $15,000; Singles and doubles draws	(Spain) Irene Burillo Escorihuela (Spain) Andrea Lázaro García; 6–4, 6–4	(Chile) Fernanda Brito (Guatemala) Melissa Morales	(Guatemala) Melissa Morales (Czech Republic) Anna Sisková	(Netherlands) Merel Hoedt (Serbia) Draginja Vuković (Italy) Verena Hofer (Spain) Irene Burillo Escorihuela
