= 2018 Internazionali Femminili di Brescia – Singles =

Singles
- 2018 Internazionali Femminili di Brescia

Final
- Champion: (Estonia) Kaia Kanepi
- Runner-up: (Italy) Martina Trevisan
- Score: 6–4, 6–3

Events
Singles	Doubles
← 2017 ·	Internazionali Femminili di Brescia	· 2019 →

Polona Hercog was the defending champion, but chose not to participate.

Kaia Kanepi won the title, defeating Martina Trevisan in the final, 6–4, 6–3.

== Seeds ==
1. (Estonia) Kaia Kanepi (champion)
2. (Romania) Alexandra Dulgheru (quarterfinals)
3. (Italy) Deborah Chiesa (first round)
4. (Liechtenstein) Kathinka von Deichmann (quarterfinals)
5. (Turkey) Çağla Büyükakçay (first round)
6. (Italy) Martina Trevisan (final)
7. (United States) Francesca Di Lorenzo (semifinals)
8. (United States) Kayla Day (first round)

== Draw ==
=== Key ===
- Q = Qualifier
- WC = Wild card
- LL = Lucky loser
- Alt = Alternate
- ITF = ITF entry
- PR = Protected ranking
- SR = Special ranking
- SE = Special exempt
- JE = Junior exempt
- JR = Junior Accelerator Programme entrant
- CO = College Accelerator Programme entrant
- NG = Next Gen Accelerator Program entrant
- w/o = Walkover
- r = Retired
- d = Defaulted

=== Finals ===
Semifinals
1/WC	(Estonia) Kaia Kanepi	6	6
(Italy) Anastasia Grymalska	2	0
6	(Italy) Martina Trevisan	6	6
7	(United States) Francesca Di Lorenzo	4	2

Final
1/WC	(Estonia) Kaia Kanepi	6	6
6	(Italy) Martina Trevisan	4	3

=== Top half ===
First round
1/WC	(Estonia) K Kanepi	6	6
(Italy) G Brescia	2	3
(Russia) E Rybakina	6	6
(Ukraine) K Zavatska	3	2
WC	(Italy) A Matteucci	4	6	6^{6}
(Georgia (country)) E Gorgodze	6	3	7^{8}
(Latvia) D Marcinkēviča	6	6
8	(United States) K Day	0	1
4	(Liechtenstein) K von Deichmann	3	6	6
(France) C Paquet	6	2	0
PR	(Hungary) RL Jani	1	7	6
PR	(United States) E Halbauer	6	5	1
(Italy) A Grymalska	6	6
(Turkey) İ Soylu	3	1
(Mexico) R Zarazúa	6	6^{7}	7
5	(Turkey) Ç Büyükakçay	4	7^{9}	5

Second round
1/WC	(Estonia) K Kanepi	6	6
(Russia) E Rybakina	2	2
(Georgia (country)) E Gorgodze	5
(Latvia) D Marcinkēviča	2^{r}
4	(Liechtenstein) K von Deichmann	6	7
PR	(Hungary) RL Jani	3	5
(Italy) A Grymalska	7^{7}	6
(Mexico) R Zarazúa	6^{4}	1

Quarterfinals
1/WC	(Estonia) K Kanepi	6	6
(Georgia (country)) E Gorgodze	1	1
4	(Liechtenstein) K von Deichmann	2	4
(Italy) A Grymalska	6	6

Semifinals
1/WC	(Estonia) K Kanepi	6	6
(Italy) A Grymalska	2	0

=== Bottom half ===
First round
6	(Italy) M Trevisan	6	6
WC	(Italy) L Stefanini	0	3
Q	(Italy) L Samsonova	6	7^{7}
Q	(Romania) N Dascălu	1	6^{4}
(Italy) J Pieri	6	6
(Ukraine) G Poznikhirenko	4	4
(Germany) L Siegemund	7	6
3	(Italy) D Chiesa	5	1
7	(United States) F Di Lorenzo	7	6
Q	(Poland) K Piter	5	1
PR	(Germany) A Schäfer	7^{7}	0
(Italy) C Rosatello	6^{2}	0^{r}
Q	(Brazil) N Kurata	3	7	6
(United States) L Chirico	6	5	3
WC	(Italy) S Rubini	3	4
2	(Romania) A Dulgheru	6	6

Second round
6	(Italy) M Trevisan	2	6	6
Q	(Italy) L Samsonova	6	3	4
(Italy) J Pieri	1	0
(Germany) L Siegemund	6	6
7	(United States) F Di Lorenzo	4	7^{7}	6
PR	(Germany) A Schäfer	6	6^{3}	0
Q	(Brazil) N Kurata	6	2	1
2	(Romania) A Dulgheru	3	6	6

Quarterfinals
6	(Italy) M Trevisan	6	1	6
(Germany) L Siegemund	0	6	3
7	(United States) F Di Lorenzo	6^{5}	6	7^{7}
2	(Romania) A Dulgheru	7^{7}	2	6^{3}

Semifinals
6	(Italy) M Trevisan	6	6
7	(United States) F Di Lorenzo	4	2
