= Hanna Poznikhirenko =

Ukrainian tennis player

Ganna Poznikhirenko
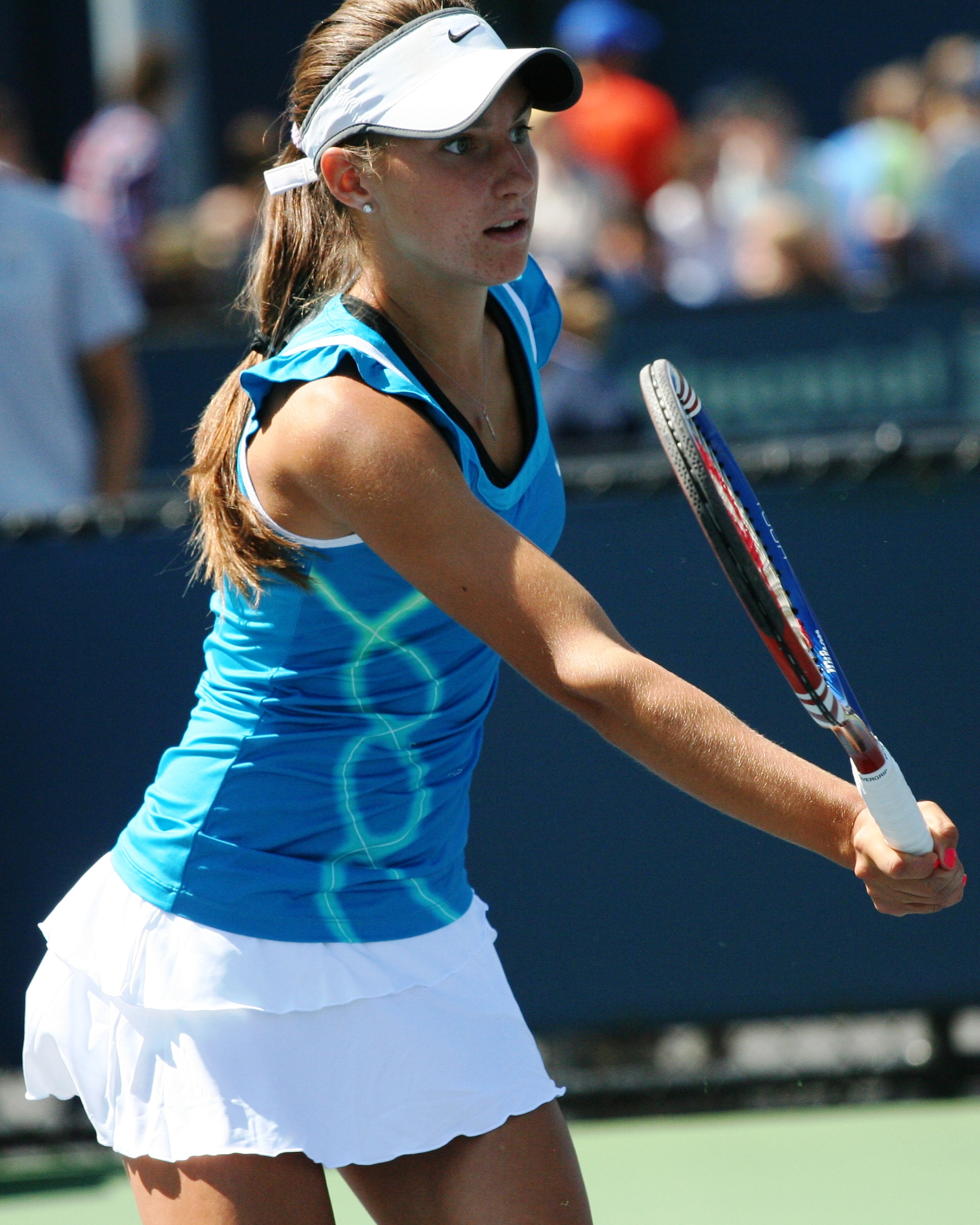
- Poznikhirenko at the 2010 US Open
- Full name: Ganna Serhiyivna Poznikhirenko
- Native name: Ганна Позніхіренко
- Country (sports): Ukraine
- Born: 8 April 1994 (age 32) Kyiv, Ukraine
- Plays: Right (two-handed backhand)
- Prize money: $124,356

Singles
- Career record: 293–195
- Career titles: 4 ITF
- Highest ranking: No. 255 (28 May 2018)

Doubles
- Career record: 146–128
- Career titles: 11 ITF
- Highest ranking: No. 214 (27 August 2018)

Hanna Serhiyivna Poznikhirenko (Ukrainian: Ганна Сергіївна Позніхіренко; born 8 April 1994) is an inactive Ukrainian tennis player. She has career-high WTA rankings of 255 in singles, achieved on 28 May 2018, and of 214 in doubles, reached on 27 August 2018.

== Career ==
During her career, Poznikhirenko has won four singles titles and eleven doubles titles on the ITF Women's World Tour.

She won her first $60k title in June 2018 at the Internazionali di Brescia in the doubles draw, partnering Cristina Dinu.

Since September 2023, Poznikhirenko has not competed on the pro tour.

== ITF Circuit finals ==
Legend
$60,000 tournaments
$25,000 tournaments
$15,000 tournaments
$10,000 tournaments

=== Singles: 11 (4 titles, 7 runner-ups) ===
Result	W–L	Date	Tournament	Tier	Surface	Opponent	Score
Loss	0–1	Nov 2011	ITF Antalya, Turkey	10k	Clay	(Serbia) Jovana Jakšić	4–6, 2–6
Win	1–1	Sep 2012	ITF Antalya, Turkey	10k	Hard	(Romania) Ana Bogdan	2–6, 7–5, 6–4
Loss	1–2	Nov 2012	ITF Antalya, Turkey	10k	Clay	(Serbia) Jovana Jakšić	2–6, 6–7^{(3)}
Loss	1–3	Jun 2015	ITF Minsk, Belarus	25k	Clay	(Russia) Daria Kasatkina	3–4 ret.
Loss	1–4	Jul 2016	ITF Pärnu, Estonia	10k	Clay	(Ukraine) Anastasia Zarycká	4–6, 6–4, 3–6
Loss	1–5	Jun 2017	Internazionali di Brescia, Italy	60k	Clay	(Slovenia) Polona Hercog	2–6, 5–7
Loss	1–6	Aug 2017	ITF Hódmezővásárhely, Hungary	25k	Clay	(Romania) Alexandra Dulgheru	5–7, 2–6
Loss	1–7	Mar 2019	ITF Moscow, Russia	W25	Hard (i)	(Kazakhstan) Elena Rybakina	5–7, 0–6
Win	2–7	Oct 2019	ITF Tabarka, Tunisia	W15	Clay	(Germany) Julyette Steur	2–6, 6–3, 6–4
Win	3–7	Nov 2019	ITF Tabarka, Tunisia	W15	Clay	(Germany) Julyette Steur	6–4, 6–1
Win	4–7	Oct 2020	ITF Sharm El Sheikh, Egypt	W15	Hard	(Egypt) Sandra Samir	6–2, 6–4

=== Doubles: 24 (11 titles, 13 runner-ups) ===
Result	W-L	Date	Tournament	Tier	Surface	Partner	Opponents	Score
Loss	0–1	Oct 2012	ITF Antalya, Turkey	10k	Clay	(Ukraine) Viktoriya Lushkova	(Romania) Alexandra Damaschin (Poland) Barbara Sobaszkiewicz	1–6, 6–3, [2–10]
Loss	0–2	Jul 2013	Přerov Cup, Czech Republic	10k	Clay	(Russia) Victoria Kan	(Czech Republic) Petra Krejsová (Czech Republic) Jesika Malečková	1–6, 6–4, [5–10]
Win	1–2	Aug 2013	ITF St. Petersburg, Russia	25k	Clay	(Russia) Victoria Kan	(Poland) Justyna Jegiołka (Thailand) Noppawan Lertcheewakarn	6–2, 6–0
Win	2–2	Apr 2014	ITF Namangan, Uzbekistan	25k	Hard	(Russia) Eugeniya Pashkova	(Venezuela) Andrea Gámiz (Russia) Yana Buchina	6–4, 6–1
Win	3–2	May 2016	ITF Hammamet, Tunisia	10k	Clay	(Serbia) Natalija Kostić	(France) Emmanuelle Girard (United Kingdom) Francesca Jones	6–4, 6–4
Loss	3–3	Jun 2016	ITF Moscow, Russia	25k	Clay	(Russia) Anna Morgina	(Russia) Natela Dzalamidze (Russia) Veronika Kudermetova	1–6, 2–6
Loss	3–4	Aug 2016	ITF Kharkiv, Ukraine	10k	Clay	(Belarus) Ilona Kremen	(Ukraine) Veronika Kapshay (Ukraine) Anastasiya Shoshyna	6–4, 4–6, [9–11]
Win	4–4	Sep 2016	ITF Bucha, Ukraine	10k	Clay	(Belarus) Ilona Kremen	(Ukraine) Veronika Kapshay (Ukraine) Anastasiya Shoshyna	6–3, 6–2
Loss	4–5	Mar 2017	ITF Gonesse, France	15k	Clay (i)	(Russia) Ekaterina Yashina	(Belarus) Ilona Kremen (Latvia) Diāna Marcinkēviča	1–6, 4–6
Win	5–5	Oct 2017	ITF Pula, Italy	25k	Clay	(Bosnia and Herzegovina) Jasmina Tinjić	(Germany) Tayisiya Morderger (Germany) Yana Morderger	6–4, 6–3
Loss	5–6	Nov 2017	ITF Pula, Italy	25k	Clay	(Italy) Anastasia Grymalska	(Italy) Claudia Giovine (Italy) Camilla Rosatello	2–6, 6–2, [7–10]
Loss	5–7	Apr 2018	ITF Óbidos, Portugal	25k	Carpet	(France) Jessika Ponchet	(United Kingdom) Sarah Beth Grey (United Kingdom) Olivia Nicholls	2–6, 1–6
Win	6–7	Jun 2018	Internazionali di Brescia, Italy	60k	Clay	(Romania) Cristina Dinu	(Russia) Alexandra Panova (Russia) Anastasia Pribylova	6–3, 7–6^{(6)}
Win	7–7	Aug 2018	ITF Leipzig, Germany	25k	Clay	(Romania) Cristina Dinu	(Czech Republic) Petra Krejsová (Czech Republic) Jesika Malečková	4–6, 6–0, [10–5]
Win	8–7	Jan 2019	Tatarstan Winter Cup, Russia	W25	Hard (i)	(Germany) Vivian Heisen	(Russia) Alena Fomina (Russia) Ekaterina Yashina	6–4, 6–3
Loss	8–8	Feb 2019	Trnava Indoor, Slovakia	W25	Hard (i)	(Slovakia) Michaela Hončová	(Bulgaria) Elitsa Kostova (Romania) Elena Bogdan	5–7, 6–7^{(5)}
Loss	8–9	Mar 2019	ITF Moscow, Russia	W25	Hard (i)	(Germany) Vivian Heisen	(Kazakhstan) Elena Rybakina (Russia) Sofya Lansere	6–1, 3–6, [4–10]
Loss	8–10	Aug 2019	ITF Penza, Russia	W25	Hard	(Russia) Anastasia Gasanova	(Russia) Vlada Koval (Russia) Kamilla Rakhimova	0–6, 3–6
Loss	8–11	Sep 2019	ITF Pula, Italy	W25	Clay	(United States) Chiara Scholl	(France) Estelle Cascino (Italy) Giorgia Marchetti	4–6, 3–6
Loss	8–12	Oct 2019	ITF Tabarka, Tunisia	W15	Clay	(Germany) Julyette Steur	(Bosnia and Herzegovina) Nefisa Berberović (Croatia) Silvia Njirić	6–7^{(5)}, 4–6
Win	9–12	Nov 2019	ITF Tabarka, Tunisia	W15	Clay	(Germany) Julyette Steur	(France) Yasmine Mansouri (Burundi) Sada Nahimana	7–6^{(9)}, 6–3
Loss	9–13	Feb 2020	Trnava Indoor, Slovakia	W25	Hard (i)	(Russia) Victoria Kan	(Czech Republic) Miriam Kolodziejová (Romania) Laura Ioana Paar	1–6, 1–6
Win	10–13	Oct 2022	ITF Redding, United States	W25	Hard	(United States) Rasheeda McAdoo	(United States) Alexa Glatch (Indonesia) Aldila Sutjiadi	7–6^{(3)}, 7–5
Win	11–13	May 2023	ITF Bethany Beach, United States	W25	Clay	(United States) Alexa Glatch	(United States) Victoria Osuigwe (South Africa) Gabriella Broadfoot	7–5, 7–5

Sporting positions
Preceded by (United States) Lauren Herring / (United States) Madison Keys	Orange Bowl Girls' Doubles Champion; 2011; With: (Russia) Victoria Kan	Succeeded by (United States) Gabrielle Andrews / (United States) Taylor Townsend
