= 2018 Internazionali Femminili di Brescia – Doubles =

Doubles
- 2018 Internazionali Femminili di Brescia

Final
- Champions: (Romania) Cristina Dinu (Ukraine) Ganna Poznikhirenko
- Runners-up: (Russia) Alexandra Panova (Russia) Anastasia Pribylova
- Score: 6–3, 7–6^{(8–6)}

Events
Singles	Doubles
← 2017 ·	Internazionali Femminili di Brescia	· 2019 →

Julia Glushko and Priscilla Hon were the defending champions, however Glushko chose to participate in Hua Hin, while Hon chose to participate in Surbiton.

Cristina Dinu and Ganna Poznikhirenko won the title, defeating Alexandra Panova and Anastasia Pribylova in the final, 6–3, 7–6^{(8–6)}.

== Seeds ==
1. (United States) Francesca Di Lorenzo / (Italy) Camilla Rosatello (first round)
2. (Romania) Cristina Dinu / (Ukraine) Ganna Poznikhirenko (champions)
3. (Georgia (country)) Ekaterine Gorgodze / (Italy) Anastasia Grymalska (semifinals)
4. (Italy) Claudia Giovine / (Hungary) Réka Luca Jani (quarterfinals)

== Draw ==
=== Key ===
- Q = Qualifier
- WC = Wild card
- LL = Lucky loser
- Alt = Alternate
- SE = Special exempt
- PR = Protected ranking
- ITF = ITF entry
- JE = Junior exempt
- w/o = Walkover
- r = Retired
- d = Defaulted
- SR = Special ranking

=== Draw ===
First round
1	(United States) F Di Lorenzo (Italy) C Rosatello	4	6	[6]
(Russia) A Panova (Russia) Ana Pribylova	6	2	[10]
(Italy) G Brescia (Brazil) G Cé	3	6	[4]
(Italy) L Bronzetti (Italy) A-G Remondina	6	4	[10]
4	(Italy) C Giovine (Hungary) RL Jani	6	6
(Chile) B Gatica (Brazil) R Pereira	2	3
WC	(Poland) E Duda (Russia) E Rybakina	1	3
(Spain) A Bolsova Zadoinov (United States) L Chirico	6	6
WC	(Italy) E Canovi (Italy) S Cicognani	0	1
(Italy) T Pieri (Italy) L Stefanini	6	6
(Italy) D Chiesa (Italy) A Matteucci	6	2	[5]
3	(Georgia (country)) E Gorgodze (Italy) A Grymalska	3	6	[10]
(Brazil) N Kurata (Brazil) E Piai	6^{3}	7^{7}	[10]
WC	(Italy) B Ivaldi (Italy) MA Zmău	7^{7}	6^{5}	[7]
(Brazil) C Alves (Brazil) TG Pedretti	2	4
2	(Romania) C Dinu (Ukraine) G Poznikhirenko	6	6

Quarterfinals
(Russia) A Panova (Russia) Ana Pribylova	6	6
(Italy) L Bronzetti (Italy) A-G Remondina	2	4
4	(Italy) C Giovine (Hungary) RL Jani	2	6^{6}
(Spain) A Bolsova Zadoinov (United States) L Chirico	6	7^{8}
(Italy) T Pieri (Italy) L Stefanini	6	2	[5]
3	(Georgia (country)) E Gorgodze (Italy) A Grymalska	2	6	[10]
(Brazil) N Kurata (Brazil) E Piai	6	1	[2]
2	(Romania) C Dinu (Ukraine) G Poznikhirenko	3	6	[10]

Semifinals
(Russia) A Panova (Russia) Ana Pribylova	5	6	[10]
(Spain) A Bolsova Zadoinov (United States) L Chirico	7	4	[7]
3	(Georgia (country)) E Gorgodze (Italy) A Grymalska	5	5
2	(Romania) C Dinu (Ukraine) G Poznikhirenko	7	7

Final
(Russia) A Panova (Russia) Ana Pribylova	3	6^{6}
2	(Romania) C Dinu (Ukraine) G Poznikhirenko	6	7^{8}
