= 2018 Internazionali Femminili di Brescia =

- Date: 4–10 June
- Edition: 11th
- Category: ITF Women's Circuit
- Prize money: $60,000
- Surface: Clay
- Location: Brescia, Italy

Champions

Singles
- (Estonia) Kaia Kanepi

Doubles
- (Romania) Cristina Dinu / (Ukraine) Ganna Poznikhirenko
- Internazionali Femminili di Brescia

The 2018 Internazionali Femminili di Brescia was a professional tennis tournament played on outdoor clay courts. It was the eleventh edition of the tournament and was part of the 2018 ITF Women's Circuit. It took place in Brescia, Italy, on 4–10 June 2018.

== Singles main draw entrants ==
=== Seeds ===
Country	Player	Rank^{1}	Seed
EST	Kaia Kanepi	52	1
ROU	Alexandra Dulgheru	159	2
ITA	Deborah Chiesa	161	3
LIE	Kathinka von Deichmann	171	4
TUR	Çağla Büyükakçay	181	5
ITA	Martina Trevisan	185	6
USA	Francesca Di Lorenzo	188	7
USA	Kayla Day	189	8

- ^{1} Rankings as of 28 May 2018.

=== Other entrants ===
The following players received a wildcard into the singles main draw:

- (Estonia) Kaia Kanepi
- (Italy) Alice Matteucci
- (Italy) Stefania Rubini
- (Italy) Lucrezia Stefanini

The following players received entry using protected rankings:

- (United States) Elizabeth Halbauer
- (Hungary) Réka Luca Jani
- (Germany) Anne Schäfer

The following players received entry from the qualifying draw:

- (Romania) Nicoleta Dascălu
- (Brazil) Nathaly Kurata
- (Poland) Katarzyna Piter
- (Italy) Ludmilla Samsonova

== Champions ==
=== Singles ===
- (Estonia) Kaia Kanepi def. (Italy) Martina Trevisan, 6–4, 6–3

=== Doubles ===
- (Romania) Cristina Dinu / (Ukraine) Ganna Poznikhirenko def. (Russia) Alexandra Panova / (Russia) Anastasia Pribylova, 6–3, 7–6^{(8–6)}
