= 2017 L'Open Emeraude Solaire de Saint-Malo =

- Date: 18–24 September
- Edition: 22nd
- Category: ITF Women's Circuit
- Prize money: $60,000+H
- Surface: Clay
- Location: Saint-Malo, France

Champions

Singles
- (Slovenia) Polona Hercog

Doubles
- (Latvia) Diāna Marcinkēviča / (Chile) Daniela Seguel
← 2016 ·	L'Open Emeraude Solaire de Saint-Malo	· 2018 →

The 2017 L'Open Emeraude Solaire de Saint-Malo was a professional tennis tournament played on outdoor clay courts. It was the twenty-second edition of the tournament and was part of the 2017 ITF Women's Circuit. It took place in Saint-Malo, France, on 18–24 September 2017.

== Singles main draw entrants ==
=== Seeds ===
Country	Player	Rank^{1}	Seed
ROU	Mihaela Buzărnescu	127	1
GER	Tamara Korpatsch	139	2
BUL	Viktoriya Tomova	158	3
ROU	Alexandra Cadanțu	162	4
ROU	Irina Bara	176	5
SLO	Polona Hercog	183	6
TUR	Çağla Büyükakçay	186	7
ESP	Sílvia Soler Espinosa	191	8

- ^{1} Rankings as of 11 September 2017.

=== Other entrants ===
The following players received a wildcard into the singles main draw:

- (France) Audrey Albié
- (France) Elixane Lechemia
- (France) Alizé Lim
- (France) Jessika Ponchet

The following players received entry from the qualifying draw:

- (Belgium) Marie Benoît
- (Greece) Eleni Kordolaimi
- (France) Irina Ramialison
- (Belgium) Kimberley Zimmermann

The following players received entry as lucky losers:

- (Spain) Yvonne Cavallé Reimers
- (Ukraine) Anastasiya Vasylyeva

== Champions ==
=== Singles ===
- (Slovenia) Polona Hercog def. (Latvia) Diāna Marcinkēviča, 6–3, 6–3

=== Doubles ===
- (Latvia) Diāna Marcinkēviča / (Chile) Daniela Seguel def. (Romania) Irina Bara / (Romania) Mihaela Buzărnescu, 6–3, 6–3
