= 2016 L'Open Emeraude Solaire de Saint-Malo =

- Date: 19–25 September
- Edition: 21st
- Category: ITF Women's Circuit
- Prize money: $50,000+H
- Surface: Clay
- Location: Saint-Malo, France

Champions

Singles
- (Ukraine) Maryna Zanevska

Doubles
- (North Macedonia) Lina Gjorcheska / (Latvia) Diāna Marcinkēviča
| ← 2015 · | L'Open Emeraude Solaire de Saint-Malo | · 2017 → |

The 2016 L'Open Emeraude Solaire de Saint-Malo was a professional tennis tournament played on outdoor clay courts. It was the 21st edition of the tournament and part of the 2016 ITF Women's Circuit, offering a total of $50,000+H in prize money. It took place in Saint-Malo, France, on 19–25 September 2016.

== Singles main draw entrants ==
=== Seeds ===
| Country | Player | Rank^{1} | Seed |
|---|---|---|---|
| ESP | Sílvia Soler Espinosa | 133 | 1 |
| AUT | Barbara Haas | 135 | 2 |
| NED | Cindy Burger | 139 | 3 |
| BUL | Isabella Shinikova | 145 | 4 |
| FRA | Virginie Razzano | 164 | 5 |
| FRA | Myrtille Georges | 182 | 6 |
| SRB | Nina Stojanović | 193 | 7 |
| UKR | Maryna Zanevska | 194 | 8 |

- ^{1} Rankings as of 12 September 2016.

=== Other entrants ===
The following player received a wildcard into the singles main draw:

- (France) Audrey Albié
- (France) Joséphine Boualem
- (France) Fiona Ferro
- (France) Esther Thébault

The following players received entry from the qualifying draw:

- (Brazil) Beatriz Haddad Maia
- (Greece) Eleni Kordolaimi
- (Italy) Alice Matteucci
- (Italy) Camilla Rosatello

The following player received entry by a lucky loser spot:

- (France) Harmony Tan

The following player received entry by a special exempt:

- (France) Chloé Paquet

The following player received entry by a protected ranking:

- (France) Claire Feuerstein

== Champions ==
=== Singles ===
- (Ukraine) Maryna Zanevska def. (Italy) Camilla Rosatello, 6–1, 6–3

=== Doubles ===
- (North Macedonia) Lina Gjorcheska / (Latvia) Diāna Marcinkēviča def. (Romania) Alexandra Cadanțu / (Romania) Jaqueline Cristian, 3–6, 6–3, [10–8]
