= 2019 Internazionali Femminili di Brescia =

- Date: 3–9 June 2019
- Edition: 12th
- Category: ITF Women's World Tennis Tour
- Prize money: $60,000
- Surface: Clay
- Location: Brescia, Italy

Champions

Singles
- (Italy) Jasmine Paolini

Doubles
- (Venezuela) Andrea Gámiz / (Brazil) Paula Cristina Gonçalves
← 2018 ·	Internazionali Femminili di Brescia	· 2022 →

The 2019 Internazionali Femminili di Brescia was a professional tennis tournament played on outdoor clay courts. It was the twelfth edition of the tournament which was part of the 2019 ITF Women's World Tennis Tour. It took place in Brescia, Italy between 3 and 9 June 2019.

== Singles main-draw entrants ==
=== Seeds ===
Country	Player	Rank^{1}	Seed
CHN	Wang Xiyu	133	1
SUI	Conny Perrin	140	2
USA	Francesca Di Lorenzo	154	3
ITA	Martina Trevisan	156	4
CHN	Han Xinyun	160	5
FRA	Chloé Paquet	166	6
BUL	Viktoriya Tomova	174	7
NED	Richèl Hogenkamp	177	8

- ^{1} Rankings are as of 27 May 2019.

=== Other entrants ===
The following players received wildcards into the singles main draw:

- (Italy) Deborah Chiesa
- (Italy) Elisabetta Cocciaretto
- (Italy) Sara Errani
- (Italy) Jessica Pieri

The following player received entry using a protected ranking:

- (Switzerland) Romina Oprandi

The following players received entry from the qualifying draw:

- (Italy) Lucia Bronzetti
- (Italy) Federica Di Sarra
- (France) Océane Dodin
- (Brazil) Paula Cristina Gonçalves
- (Austria) Julia Grabher
- (Italy) Dalila Spiteri

== Champions ==
=== Singles ===
- (Italy) Jasmine Paolini def. (Latvia) Diāna Marcinkēviča, 6–2, 6–1

=== Doubles ===
- (Venezuela) Andrea Gámiz / (Brazil) Paula Cristina Gonçalves def. (Italy) Anastasia Grymalska / (Italy) Giorgia Marchetti, 6–3, 4–6, [12–10]
