= 2022 Internazionali Femminili di Brescia =

Tennis tournament

- Date: 30 May–5 June 2022
- Edition: 13th
- Category: ITF Women's World Tennis Tour
- Prize money: $60,000
- Surface: Clay / Outdoor
- Location: Brescia, Italy

Champions

Singles
- (Spain) Ángela Fita Boluda

Doubles
- (Italy) Nuria Brancaccio / (Italy) Lisa Pigato
← 2019 ·	Internazionali Femminili di Brescia	· 2023 →

The 2022 Internazionali Femminili di Brescia was a professional tennis tournament played on outdoor clay courts. It was the thirteenth edition of the tournament which was part of the 2022 ITF Women's World Tennis Tour. It took place in Brescia, Italy between 30 May and 5 June 2022.

== Singles main draw entrants ==
=== Seeds ===
Country	Player	Rank^{1}	Seed
SUI	Ylena In-Albon	117	1
ESP	Rebeka Masarova	121	2
CHN	Yuan Yue	144	3
~~GER~~	~~Nastasja Schunk~~	~~165~~	~~4~~
GRE	Despina Papamichail	170	5
SUI	Stefanie Vögele	186	6
ITA	Sara Errani	194	7
~~CHI~~	~~Bárbara Gatica~~	~~208~~	~~8~~

- ^{1} Rankings are as of 23 May 2022.

=== Other entrants ===
The following players received wildcards into the singles main draw:

- (Italy) Gloria Ceschi
- (Italy) Melania Delai
- (Italy) Lisa Pigato
- (Italy) Angelica Raggi

The following players received entry from the qualifying draw:

- (France) Sara Cakarevic
- (Italy) Diletta Cherubini
- (Spain) Ángela Fita Boluda
- (Italy) Nicole Fossa Huergo
- (Colombia) Yuliana Lizarazo
- (Argentina) Jazmín Ortenzi
- (Bulgaria) Julia Terziyska
- (Italy) Aurora Zantedeschi

The following players received entry as lucky losers:

- (Italy) Nuria Brancaccio
- (Kazakhstan) Zhibek Kulambayeva

== Champions ==
=== Singles ===
- (Spain) Ángela Fita Boluda def. (Greece) Despina Papamichail, 6–2, 6–0

=== Doubles ===
- (Italy) Nuria Brancaccio / (Italy) Lisa Pigato def. (Kazakhstan) Zhibek Kulambayeva / (Latvia) Diāna Marcinkēviča, 6–4, 6–1
