= 2017 L'Open Emeraude Solaire de Saint-Malo – Doubles =

Doubles
- 2017 L'Open Emeraude Solaire de Saint-Malo

Final
- Champion: (Latvia) Diāna Marcinkēviča (Chile) Daniela Seguel
- Runner-up: (Romania) Irina Bara (Romania) Mihaela Buzărnescu
- Score: 6–3, 6–3

Events
Singles	Doubles
← 2016 ·	L'Open Emeraude Solaire de Saint-Malo	· 2018 →

Lina Gjorcheska and Diāna Marcinkēviča were the defending champions, but Gjorcheska chose not to participate.

Marcinkēviča chose to partner Daniela Seguel and successfully defended the title, defeating Irina Bara and Mihaela Buzărnescu 6–3, 6–3 in the final.

== Seeds ==
1. (Romania) Alexandra Cadanțu / (Spain) Sílvia Soler Espinosa (semifinals)
2. (Romania) Irina Bara / (Romania) Mihaela Buzărnescu (final)
3. (Latvia) Diāna Marcinkēviča / (Chile) Daniela Seguel (champions)
4. (Sweden) Cornelia Lister / (Spain) María Teresa Torró Flor (semifinals)

== Draw ==
=== Key ===
- Q = Qualifier
- WC = Wild card
- LL = Lucky loser
- Alt = Alternate
- SE = Special exempt
- PR = Protected ranking
- ITF = ITF entry
- JE = Junior exempt
- w/o = Walkover
- r = Retired
- d = Defaulted
- SR = Special ranking

First round
1	(Romania) A Cadanțu (Spain) S Soler Espinosa	6	6
(France) A Lim (Poland) K Piter	2	3
(Netherlands) B Schoofs (Bosnia and Herzegovina) J Tinjić	6	6
(France) C Thébault (France) E Thébault	1	1
3	(Latvia) D Marcinkēviča (Chile) D Seguel	6	6
(Belgium) D Kerfs (United States) C Scholl	4	1
(Netherlands) C Burger (France) M Partaud	6	6
(France) M Armitano (France) E Lechemia	4	3
WC	(France) A Albié (France) T Gravouil	2	4
(Belgium) M Benoît (Belgium) K Zimmermann	6	6
(France) F Ferro (France) C Paquet	6	4	[6]
4	(Sweden) C Lister (Spain) MT Torró Flor	4	6	[10]
(Spain) Y Cavallé Reimers (Ukraine) G Poznikhirenko	7	2	[10]
(Georgia (country)) S Shapatava (Ukraine) A Vasylyeva	5	6	[1]
(Greece) E Kordolaimi (Australia) S Mendez	6^{10}	2
2	(Romania) I Bara (Romania) M Buzărnescu	7^{12}	6

Quarterfinals
1	(Romania) A Cadanțu (Spain) S Soler Espinosa	7^{7}	1	[10]
(Netherlands) B Schoofs (Bosnia and Herzegovina) J Tinjić	6^{4}	6	[7]
3	(Latvia) D Marcinkēviča (Chile) D Seguel	7	6
(Netherlands) C Burger (France) M Partaud	5	2
(Belgium) M Benoît (Belgium) K Zimmermann
4	(Sweden) C Lister (Spain) MT Torró Flor	w/o
(Spain) Y Cavallé Reimers (Ukraine) G Poznikhirenko	3	1
2	(Romania) I Bara (Romania) M Buzărnescu	6	6

Semifinals
1	(Romania) A Cadanțu (Spain) S Soler Espinosa	3	4
3	(Latvia) D Marcinkēviča (Chile) D Seguel	6	6
4	(Sweden) C Lister (Spain) MT Torró Flor	3	1
2	(Romania) I Bara (Romania) M Buzărnescu	6	6

Final
3	(Latvia) D Marcinkēviča (Chile) D Seguel	6	6
2	(Romania) I Bara (Romania) M Buzărnescu	3	3
