= 2016 L'Open Emeraude Solaire de Saint-Malo – Doubles =

Doubles
- 2016 L'Open Emeraude Solaire de Saint-Malo

Final
- Champions: (North Macedonia) Lina Gjorcheska (Latvia) Diāna Marcinkēviča
- Runners-up: (Romania) Alexandra Cadanțu (Romania) Jaqueline Cristian
- Score: 3–6, 6–3, [10–8]

Events
Singles	Doubles
← 2015 ·	L'Open Emeraude Solaire de Saint-Malo	· 2017 →

Kristína Kučová and Anastasija Sevastova were the defending champions, but chose not to participate.

Lina Gjorcheska and Diāna Marcinkēviča won the title, defeating Alexandra Cadanțu and Jaqueline Cristian in the final, 3–6, 6–3, [10–8].

== Seeds ==
1. (India) Prarthana Thombare / (Ukraine) Maryna Zanevska (semifinals)
2. (Switzerland) Conny Perrin / (Bulgaria) Isabella Shinikova (first round)
3. (Belgium) Elyne Boeykens / (Germany) Nicola Geuer (quarterfinals)
4. (Sweden) Cornelia Lister / (Serbia) Nina Stojanović (first round)

== Draw ==
=== Key ===
- Q = Qualifier
- WC = Wild card
- LL = Lucky loser
- Alt = Alternate
- SE = Special exempt
- PR = Protected ranking
- ITF = ITF entry
- JE = Junior exempt
- w/o = Walkover
- r = Retired
- d = Defaulted
- SR = Special ranking

First round
(France) M Gheziel (France) L Lampla	1	1
(France) A Albié (France) H Tan	6	6
4	(Sweden) C Lister (Serbia) N Stojanović	6^{3}	6	[9]
(North Macedonia) L Gjorcheska (Latvia) D Marcinkēviča	7^{7}	4	[11]
(Spain) O Parres Azcoitia (Spain) O Sáez Larra	3	7^{8}	[14]
(Greece) E Kordolaimi (Russia) A Pribylova	6	6^{6}	[12]
(Russia) P Leykina (France) L Sarrazin	3	6^{1}
(Romania) A Cadanțu (Romania) J Cristian	6	7^{7}
(France) M Georges (France) M Partaud	1	0
3	(Belgium) E Boeykens (Germany) N Geuer	6	6
(France) F Ferro (France) C Paquet	5	6^{6}
(Italy) A Matteucci (Italy) C Rosatello	7	7^{8}
(Ukraine) A Fomina (Italy) A Grymalska	6	2	[10]
2	(Switzerland) C Perrin (Bulgaria) I Shinikova	3	6	[4]

Quarterfinals
1	(India) P Thombare (Ukraine) M Zanevska	6	6
(France) A Albié (France) H Tan	2	0
(North Macedonia) L Gjorcheska (Latvia) D Marcinkēviča	6	6
(Spain) O Parres Azcoitia (Spain) O Sáez Larra	1	3
(Romania) A Cadanțu (Romania) J Cristian	6	6
3	(Belgium) E Boeykens (Germany) N Geuer	3	2
(Italy) A Matteucci (Italy) C Rosatello	7^{7}	6
(Ukraine) A Fomina (Italy) A Grymalska	6^{2}	3

Semifinals
1	(India) P Thombare (Ukraine) M Zanevska	6^{4}	6^{5}
(North Macedonia) L Gjorcheska (Latvia) D Marcinkēviča	7^{7}	7^{7}
(Romania) A Cadanțu (Romania) J Cristian	6	7^{7}
(Italy) A Matteucci (Italy) C Rosatello	2	6^{5}

Final
(North Macedonia) L Gjorcheska (Latvia) D Marcinkēviča	3	6	[10]
(Romania) A Cadanțu (Romania) J Cristian	6	3	[8]
