= 2017 L'Open Emeraude Solaire de Saint-Malo – Singles =

Singles
- 2017 L'Open Emeraude Solaire de Saint-Malo

Final
- Champion: (Slovenia) Polona Hercog
- Runner-up: (Latvia) Diāna Marcinkēviča
- Score: 6–3, 6–3

Events
| Singles | Doubles |
| ← 2016 · | L'Open Emeraude Solaire de Saint-Malo | · 2018 → |

Maryna Zanevska was the defending champion, but chose not to participate.

Polona Hercog won the title, defeating Diāna Marcinkēviča in the final, 6–3, 6–3.

== Seeds ==
1. (Romania) Mihaela Buzărnescu (quarterfinals)
2. (Germany) Tamara Korpatsch (first round)
3. (Bulgaria) Viktoriya Tomova (first round)
4. (Romania) Alexandra Cadanțu (semifinals; retired)
5. (Romania) Irina Bara (second round)
6. (Slovenia) Polona Hercog (champion)
7. (Turkey) Çağla Büyükakçay (quarterfinals)
8. (Spain) Sílvia Soler Espinosa (first round)

== Draw ==
=== Key ===
- Q = Qualifier
- WC = Wild card
- LL = Lucky loser
- Alt = Alternate
- SE = Special exempt
- PR = Protected ranking
- ITF = ITF entry
- JE = Junior exempt
- w/o = Walkover
- r = Retired
- d = Defaulted
- SR = Special ranking

=== Finals ===
Semifinals
(Latvia) Diāna Marcinkēviča | 6 | 4
4 | (Romania) Alexandra Cadanțu | 1 | 2^{r}
(Russia) Valentyna Ivakhnenko | 1 | 1
6 | (Slovenia) Polona Hercog | 6 | 6

Final
(Latvia) Diāna Marcinkēviča | 3 | 3
6 | (Slovenia) Polona Hercog | 6 | 6

=== Top half ===
First round
1 | (Romania) M Buzărnescu | 6 | 6
WC | (France) J Ponchet | 4 | 0
Q | (Belgium) M Benoît | 2^{r}
(Switzerland) P Schnyder | 3
Q | (Greece) E Kordolaimi | 1 | 6 | 4
(Latvia) D Marcinkēviča | 6 | 1 | 6
WC | (France) A Lim | 3 | 6 | 6
8 | (Spain) S Soler Espinosa | 6 | 3 | 1
4 | (Romania) A Cadanțu | 6 | 6
LL | (Spain) Y Cavallé Reimers | 1 | 3
(France) C Paquet | 4 | 0
(Czech Republic) T Smitková | 6 | 6
(Georgia (country)) S Shapatava | 6^{3} | 4
(Chile) D Seguel | 7^{7} | 6
(France) F Ferro | 5 | 4
5 | (Romania) I Bara | 7 | 6

Second round
1 | (Romania) M Buzărnescu | 1 | 6 | 6
(Switzerland) P Schnyder | 6 | 2 | 3
(Latvia) D Marcinkēviča | 6 | 6
WC | (France) A Lim | 4 | 3
4 | (Romania) A Cadanțu | 1 | 6 | 7
(Czech Republic) T Smitková | 6 | 1 | 5
(Chile) D Seguel | 6 | 6
5 | (Romania) I Bara | 3 | 1

Quarterfinals
1 | (Romania) M Buzărnescu | 6 | 6^{3} | 4
(Latvia) D Marcinkēviča | 4 | 7^{7} | 6
4 | (Romania) A Cadanțu | 2 | 6 | 6
(Chile) D Seguel | 6 | 3 | 4

Semifinals
(Latvia) D Marcinkēviča | 6 | 4
4 | (Romania) A Cadanțu | 1 | 2^{r}

=== Bottom half ===
First round
7 | (Turkey) Ç Büyükakçay | 6^{8} | 6 | 7^{9}
(Ukraine) G Poznikhirenko | 7^{10} | 3 | 6^{7}
WC | (France) E Lechemia | 6^{5} | 6 | 2
LL | (Ukraine) A Vasylyeva | 7^{7} | 3 | 6
Q | (France) I Ramialison | 6^{5} | 7^{9} | 7
(Spain) MT Torró Flor | 7^{7} | 6^{7} | 5
(Russia) V Ivakhnenko | 0 | 6 | 6
3 | (Bulgaria) V Tomova | 6 | 2 | 4
6 | (Slovenia) P Hercog | 6 | 7^{7}
(Netherlands) B Schoofs | 1 | 6^{4}
(Netherlands) C Burger | 5 | 4
WC | (France) A Albié | 7 | 6
(Poland) K Piter | 2 | 6 | 2
(Australia) I Wallace | 6 | 2 | 6
Q | (Belgium) K Zimmermann | 6 | 6
2 | (Germany) T Korpatsch | 4 | 4

Second round
7 | (Turkey) Ç Büyükakçay | 6 | 6
LL | (Ukraine) A Vasylyeva | 4 | 2
Q | (France) I Ramialison | 6 | 3 | 5
(Russia) V Ivakhnenko | 4 | 6 | 7
6 | (Slovenia) P Hercog | 6 | 6
WC | (France) A Albié | 2 | 1
(Australia) I Wallace | 5 | 4
Q | (Belgium) K Zimmermann | 7 | 6

Quarterfinals
7 | (Turkey) Ç Büyükakçay | 7^{7} | 6^{2} | 1
(Russia) V Ivakhnenko | 6^{2} | 7^{7} | 6
6 | (Slovenia) P Hercog | 6 | 6
Q | (Belgium) K Zimmermann | 1 | 1

Semifinals
(Russia) V Ivakhnenko | 1 | 1
6 | (Slovenia) P Hercog | 6 | 6
