= 2022 Internazionali Femminili di Brescia – Singles =

Singles
- 2022 Internazionali Femminili di Brescia

Final
- Champion: (Spain) Ángela Fita Boluda
- Runner-up: (Greece) Despina Papamichail
- Score: 6–2, 6–0

Events
Singles	Doubles
← 2019 ·	Internazionali Femminili di Brescia	· 2023 →

Jasmine Paolini was the defending champion but chose not to participate.

Ángela Fita Boluda won the title, defeating Despina Papamichail in the final, 6–2, 6–0.

== Seeds ==
1. (Switzerland) Ylena In-Albon (quarterfinals)
2. (Spain) Rebeka Masarova (first round)
3. (China) Yuan Yue (second round, withdrew)
4. (Germany) Nastasja Schunk (withdrew)
5. (Greece) Despina Papamichail (final)
6. (Switzerland) Stefanie Vögele (second round)
7. (Italy) Sara Errani (quarterfinals)
8. (Chile) Bárbara Gatica (withdrew)

== Draw ==
=== Key ===
- Q = Qualifier
- WC = Wild card
- LL = Lucky loser
- Alt = Alternate
- SE = Special exempt
- PR = Protected ranking
- ITF = ITF entry
- JE = Junior exempt
- w/o = Walkover
- r = Retired
- d = Defaulted
- SR = Special ranking

=== Finals ===
Semifinals
Q	(Spain) Ángela Fita Boluda	6	6
Q	(Colombia) Yuliana Lizarazo	1	1
(Germany) Anna-Lena Friedsam	4	6	6^{4}
5	(Greece) Despina Papamichail	6	3	7^{7}

Final
Q	(Spain) Ángela Fita Boluda	6	6
5	(Greece) Despina Papamichail	2	0

=== Top half ===
First round
1	(Switzerland) Y In-Albon	6	7
(France) A Ramé	3	5
N Vikhlyantseva	7	6^{5}	6
(Romania) A Prisăcariu	5	7^{7}	4
Q	(Spain) Á Fita Boluda	6	6
Q	(Italy) N Fossa Huergo	2	0
WC	(Italy) L Pigato	6	2	3
6	(Switzerland) S Vögele	3	6	6
3	(China) Y Yuan	6	5	6
(Brazil) G Cé	4	7	4
Q	(Colombia) Y Lizarazo	6	6
(Italy) B Turati	3	1
Q	(Italy) D Cherubini	4	6	6^{2}
Q	(France) S Cakarevic	6	2	7^{7}
WC	(Italy) G Ceschi	3	3
7	(Italy) S Errani	6	6

Second round
1	(Switzerland) Y In-Albon	6	6
N Vikhlyantseva	2	3
Q	(Spain) Á Fita Boluda	6	6
6	(Switzerland) S Vögele	1	2
3	(China) Y Yuan
Q	(Colombia) Y Lizarazo	w/o
Q	(France) S Cakarevic	5	1
7	(Italy) S Errani	7	6

Quarterfinals
1	(Switzerland) Y In-Albon	6^{10}	5
Q	(Spain) Á Fita Boluda	7^{12}	7
Q	(Colombia) Y Lizarazo	6	3	7^{7}
7	(Italy) S Errani	1	6	6^{3}

Semifinals
Q	(Spain) Á Fita Boluda	6	6
Q	(Colombia) Y Lizarazo	1	1

=== Bottom half ===
First round
LL	(Italy) N Brancaccio	6	5	6
(Italy) F Di Sarra	0	7	1
(Germany) A-L Friedsam	6^{4}	6	6
WC	(Italy) M Delai	7^{7}	3	2
WC	(Italy) A Raggi	6	3	4
Q	(Bulgaria) J Terziyska	4	6	6
Q	(Italy) A Zantedeschi	6^{7}	6	7^{7}
LL	(Kazakhstan) Z Kulambayeva	7^{9}	2	6^{5}
5	(Greece) D Papamichail	6	3	6
(Norway) M Helgø	2	6	1
(Ukraine) K Zavatska	7	6
(Italy) M Di Giuseppe	5	4
(Latvia) D Marcinkēviča	4	6^{2}
Q	(Argentina) J Ortenzi	6	7^{7}
(Italy) C Rosatello	6	6
2	(Spain) R Masarova	1	3

Second round
LL	(Italy) N Brancaccio	4	6	3
(Germany) A-L Friedsam	6	3	6
Q	(Bulgaria) J Terziyska	6	6
Q	(Italy) A Zantedeschi	2	4
5	(Greece) D Papamichail	0	7	6
(Ukraine) K Zavatska	6	5	4
Q	(Argentina) J Ortenzi	7^{7}	2	6
(Italy) C Rosatello	6^{6}	6	4

Quarterfinals
(Germany) A-L Friedsam	6	6
Q	(Bulgaria) J Terziyska	4	4
5	(Greece) D Papamichail	5	6	6
Q	(Argentina) J Ortenzi	7	3	2

Semifinals
(Germany) A-L Friedsam	4	6	6^{4}
5	(Greece) D Papamichail	6	3	7^{7}
