= 2023 Internazionali Femminili di Brescia – Singles =

Singles
- 2023 Internazionali Femminili di Brescia

Final
- Champion: (Ukraine) Katarina Zavatska
- Runner-up: Yuliya Hatouka
- Score: 6–4, 6–2

Events
Singles	Doubles
← 2022 ·	Internazionali Femminili di Brescia	· 2024 →

Ángela Fita Boluda was the defending champion but lost in the semifinals to Yuliya Hatouka.

Katarina Zavatska won the title, defeating Hatouka in the final, 6–4, 6–2.

== Seeds ==
1. Polina Kudermetova (second round)
2. (Japan) Moyuka Uchijima (second round)
3. (Greece) Despina Papamichail (second round)
4. (Mexico) Marcela Zacarías (first round)
5. (United States) Ann Li (quarterfinals)
6. (Japan) Mai Hontama (quarterfinals)
7. (Argentina) Julia Riera (semifinals)
8. (Germany) Mona Barthel (first round)

== Draw ==
=== Key ===
- Q = Qualifier
- WC = Wild card
- LL = Lucky loser
- Alt = Alternate
- SE = Special exempt
- PR = Protected ranking
- ITF = ITF entry
- JE = Junior exempt
- w/o = Walkover
- r = Retired
- d = Defaulted
- SR = Special ranking

=== Finals ===
Semifinals
(Spain) Ángela Fita Boluda	4	6^{7}
Yuliya Hatouka	6	7^{9}
(Ukraine) Katarina Zavatska	6	6
7	(Argentina) Julia Riera	4	3

Final
Yuliya Hatouka	4	2
(Ukraine) Katarina Zavatska	6	6

=== Top half ===
First round
1	P Kudermetova	6	6
(Norway) M Helgø	1	4
WC	(Italy) S Rocchetti	1	2
(Spain) Á Fita Boluda	6	6
Q	(Italy) D Chiesa	3	6	4
(Czech Republic) L Havlíčková	6	4	6
S Lansere	1	3
5	(United States) A Li	6	6
3	(Greece) D Papamichail	6	6
Q	(Spain) C Hoste Ferrer	2	3
Q	(Italy) A Zantedeschi	6	4	6^{4}
Y Hatouka	4	6	7^{7}
(United States) W Osuigwe	3^{r}
(United States) L Chirico	5
(United States) H Baptiste	7^{7}	2	6
8	(Germany) M Barthel	6^{4}	6	4

Second round
1	P Kudermetova	4	1
(Spain) Á Fita Boluda	6	6
(Czech Republic) L Havlíčková	6	1	4
5	(United States) A Li	4	6	6
3	(Greece) D Papamichail	4	2
Y Hatouka	6	6
(United States) L Chirico	6^{1}	7^{7}	6
(United States) H Baptiste	7^{7}	6^{3}	4

Quarterfinals
(Spain) Á Fita Boluda	6	6
5	(United States) A Li	3	4
Y Hatouka	6	6
(United States) L Chirico	2	2

Semifinals
(Spain) Á Fita Boluda	4	6^{7}
Y Hatouka	6	7^{9}

=== Bottom half ===
First round
6	(Japan) M Hontama	7	6
WC	(Italy) J Ruggeri	5	4
WC	(Italy) G Pedone	6	6
WC	(Italy) G Ceschi	4	3
Q	(South Africa) I Kruger	2	7^{8}	4
(Ukraine) K Zavatska	6	6^{6}	6
Q	(Italy) T Pieri	7	6
4	(Mexico) M Zacarías	5	3
7	(Argentina) J Riera	6	6
(United States) F Di Lorenzo	4	1
Q	(Germany) A Schäfer	4	4
Q	(Estonia) E Malõgina	6	6
Q	(Germany) K Kanev	2	7^{7}	6
(Czech Republic) B Palicová	6	6^{5}	3
A Tikhonova	5	2
2	(Japan) M Uchijima	7	6

Second round
6	(Japan) M Hontama	6	6
WC	(Italy) G Pedone	1	1
(Ukraine) K Zavatska	6	6
Q	(Italy) T Pieri	2	0
7	(Argentina) J Riera	6	1
Q	(Estonia) E Malõgina	4	0^{r}
Q	(Germany) K Kanev	6	6
2	(Japan) M Uchijima	3	3

Quarterfinals
6	(Japan) M Hontama	4	6^{6}
(Ukraine) K Zavatska	6	7^{8}
7	(Argentina) J Riera	1	6	7^{7}
Q	(Germany) K Kanev	6	2	6^{3}

Semifinals
(Ukraine) K Zavatska	6	6
7	(Argentina) J Riera	4	3
