= 2023 Internazionali Femminili di Brescia =

Tennis tournament

- Date: 29 May–4 June 2023
- Edition: 14th
- Category: ITF Women's World Tennis Tour
- Prize money: $60,000
- Surface: Clay / Outdoor
- Location: Brescia, Italy

Champions

Singles
- (Ukraine) Katarina Zavatska

Doubles
- (Japan) Mai Hontama / (Japan) Moyuka Uchijima
← 2022 ·	Internazionali Femminili di Brescia	· 2024 →

The 2023 Internazionali Femminili di Brescia was a professional tennis tournament played on outdoor clay courts. It was the fourteenth edition of the tournament, which was part of the 2023 ITF Women's World Tennis Tour. It took place in Brescia, Italy, between 29 May and 4 June 2023.

== Champions ==
=== Singles ===
- (Ukraine) Katarina Zavatska def. Yuliya Hatouka, 6–4, 6–2

=== Doubles ===
- (Japan) Mai Hontama / (Japan) Moyuka Uchijima def. Alena Fomina-Klotz / (Australia) Olivia Tjandramulia, 6–1, 6–0

== Singles main draw entrants ==
=== Seeds ===
Country	Player	Rank	Seed
	Polina Kudermetova	142	1
JPN	Moyuka Uchijima	145	2
GRE	Despina Papamichail	157	3
MEX	Marcela Zacarías	185	4
USA	Ann Li	187	5
JPN	Mai Hontama	189	6
ARG	Julia Riera	195	7
GER	Mona Barthel	204	8

- Rankings are as of 22 May 2023.

=== Other entrants ===
The following players received wildcards into the singles main draw:

- (Italy) Gloria Ceschi
- (Italy) Georgia Pedone
- (Italy) Sofia Rocchetti
- (Italy) Jennifer Ruggeri

The following players received entry from the qualifying draw:

- (Italy) Deborah Chiesa
- (Spain) Claudia Hoste Ferrer
- (Germany) Kathleen Kanev
- (South Africa) Isabella Kruger
- (Estonia) Elena Malõgina
- (Italy) Tatiana Pieri
- (Germany) Anne Schäfer
- (Italy) Aurora Zantedeschi
