= 2018 L'Open 35 de Saint-Malo – Singles =

Singles
- 2018 L'Open 35 de Saint-Malo

Final
- Champion: (Russia) Liudmila Samsonova
- Runner-up: (Ukraine) Katarina Zavatska
- Score: 6–0, 6–2

Events
Singles	Doubles
← 2017 ·	L'Open 35 de Saint-Malo	· 2019 →

Polona Hercog was the defending champion, but chose not to participate.

Liudmila Samsonova won the title, defeating Katarina Zavatska in the final, 6–0, 6–2.

== Seeds ==
1. (Germany) Carina Witthöft (withdrew)
2. (Ukraine) Anhelina Kalinina (first round)
3. (Belgium) Ysaline Bonaventure (first round, retired)
4. (Uzbekistan) Sabina Sharipova (withdrew)
5. (Germany) Laura Siegemund (first round)
6. (Romania) Irina Bara (semifinals)
7. (Russia) Irina Khromacheva (first round)
8. (Paraguay) Verónica Cepede Royg (semifinals)
9. (Liechtenstein) Kathinka von Deichmann (quarterfinals)
10. (Czech Republic) Tereza Smitková (first round)

== Draw ==
=== Key ===
- Q = Qualifier
- WC = Wild card
- LL = Lucky loser
- Alt = Alternate
- SE = Special exempt
- PR = Protected ranking
- ITF = ITF entry
- JE = Junior exempt
- w/o = Walkover
- r = Retired
- d = Defaulted
- SR = Special ranking

=== Finals ===
Semifinals
(Ukraine) Katarina Zavatska	6^{5}	7^{7}	6
8	(Paraguay) Verónica Cepede Royg	7^{7}	6^{1}	3
Q	(Russia) Liudmila Samsonova	7^{7}	7
6	(Romania) Irina Bara	6^{4}	5

Final
(Ukraine) Katarina Zavatska	0	2
Q	(Russia) Liudmila Samsonova	6	6

=== Top half ===
First round
9	(Liechtenstein) K von Deichmann	6	6
(Chile) D Seguel	4	3
(Spain) A Bolsova Zadoinov	2	5
(Italy) J Paolini	6	7
(France) S Reix	1	5
(Ukraine) K Zavatska	6	7
(Slovakia) J Čepelová	5	6	6
7	(Russia) I Khromacheva	7	1	2
10	(Czech Republic) T Smitková	5	2
WC	(Switzerland) T Bacsinszky	7	6
(Croatia) T Mrdeža	6	6
WC	(France) C Burel	2	4
(Russia) V Ivakhnenko	1	6^{5}
(Italy) M Trevisan	6	7^{7}
LL	(Belgium) M Benoît	6^{4}	6^{4}
8	(Paraguay) V Cepede Royg	7^{7}	7^{7}

Second round
9	(Liechtenstein) K von Deichmann	6	6
(Italy) J Paolini	3	4
(Ukraine) K Zavatska	2	6	6
(Slovakia) J Čepelová	6	2	4
WC	(Switzerland) T Bacsinszky	6	6^{4}	6
(Croatia) T Mrdeža	0	7^{7}	3
(Italy) M Trevisan	2	5
8	(Paraguay) V Cepede Royg	6	7

Quarterfinals
9	(Liechtenstein) K von Deichmann	6^{5}	6	4
(Ukraine) K Zavatska	7^{7}	2	6
WC	(Switzerland) T Bacsinszky	6	3	3
8	(Paraguay) V Cepede Royg	2	6	6

Semifinals
(Ukraine) K Zavatska	6^{5}	7^{7}	6
8	(Paraguay) V Cepede Royg	7^{7}	6^{1}	3

=== Bottom half ===
First round
5	(Germany) L Siegemund	4	6	4
(Romania) A Cadanțu	6	4	6
Q	(France) M Témin	6^{3}	4
Q	(Latvia) D Marcinkēviča	7^{7}	6
Q	(Russia) L Samsonova	6	6
WC	(France) H Tan	2	1
(France) M Georges	7^{7}	2
3	(Belgium) Y Bonaventure	6^{5}	1^{r}
6	(Romania) I Bara	6	6
LL	(France) M Yerolymos	1	0
(Bulgaria) E Kostova	6^{5}	4
(Turkey) Ç Büyükakçay	7^{7}	6
(Georgia (country)) E Gorgodze	6	0	6
WC	(France) L Wargnier	3	6	3
Q	(Colombia) MF Herazo	6	7
2	(Ukraine) A Kalinina	4	5

Second round
(Romania) A Cadanțu	2	7	3
Q	(Latvia) D Marcinkēviča	6	5	6
Q	(Russia) L Samsonova	6^{5}	6	6
(France) M Georges	7^{7}	4	3
6	(Romania) I Bara	6	7
(Turkey) Ç Büyükakçay	2	5
(Georgia (country)) E Gorgodze	6	6
Q	(Colombia) MF Herazo	2	4

Quarterfinals
Q	(Latvia) D Marcinkēviča	5	6	2
Q	(Russia) L Samsonova	7	2	6
6	(Romania) I Bara	3	6	6
(Georgia (country)) E Gorgodze	6	1	4

Semifinals
Q	(Russia) L Samsonova	7^{7}	7
6	(Romania) I Bara	6^{4}	5
