= 2018 L'Open 35 de Saint-Malo =

- Date: 17–23 September
- Edition: 23rd
- Category: ITF Women's Circuit
- Prize money: $60,000+H
- Surface: Clay
- Location: Saint-Malo, France

Champions

Singles
- (Russia) Liudmila Samsonova

Doubles
- (Spain) Cristina Bucșa / (Colombia) María Fernanda Herazo
← 2017 ·	L'Open 35 de Saint-Malo	· 2019 →

The 2018 L'Open 35 de Saint-Malo was a professional tennis tournament played on outdoor clay courts. It was the twenty-third edition of the tournament and was part of the 2018 ITF Women's Circuit. It took place in Saint-Malo, France, on 17–23 September 2018.

== Singles main draw entrants ==
=== Seeds ===
Country	Player	Rank^{1}	Seed
~~GER~~	~~Carina Witthöft~~	~~92~~	~~1~~
UKR	Anhelina Kalinina	113	2
BEL	Ysaline Bonaventure	119	3
~~UZB~~	~~Sabina Sharipova~~	~~130~~	~~4~~
GER	Laura Siegemund	146	5
ROU	Irina Bara	150	6
RUS	Irina Khromacheva	154	7
PAR	Verónica Cepede Royg	157	8
LIE	Kathinka von Deichmann	159	9
CZE	Tereza Smitková	160	10

- ^{1} Rankings as of 10 September 2018.

=== Other entrants ===
The following players received a wildcard into the singles main draw:

- (Switzerland) Timea Bacsinszky
- (France) Clara Burel
- (France) Harmony Tan
- (France) Lucie Wargnier

The following players received entry from the qualifying draw:

- (Colombia) María Fernanda Herazo
- (Latvia) Diāna Marcinkēviča
- (Russia) Liudmila Samsonova
- (France) Marie Témin

The following players received entry as lucky losers:

- (Belgium) Marie Benoît
- (France) Margot Yerolymos

== Champions ==
=== Singles ===
- (Russia) Liudmila Samsonova def. (Ukraine) Katarina Zavatska, 6–0, 6–2

=== Doubles ===
- (Spain) Cristina Bucșa / (Colombia) María Fernanda Herazo def. (Romania) Alexandra Cadanțu / (Latvia) Diāna Marcinkēviča, 4–6, 6–1, [10–8]
