= 2016 L'Open Emeraude Solaire de Saint-Malo – Singles =

Singles
- 2016 L'Open Emeraude Solaire de Saint-Malo

Final
- Champion: (Ukraine) Maryna Zanevska
- Runner-up: (Italy) Camilla Rosatello
- Score: 6–1, 6–3

Events
Singles	Doubles
← 2015 ·	L'Open Emeraude Solaire de Saint-Malo	· 2017 →

Daria Kasatkina was the defending champion, but chose not to participate.

Maryna Zanevska won the title, defeating Camilla Rosatello in the final, 6–1, 6–3.

== Seeds ==
1. (Spain) Sílvia Soler Espinosa (semifinals)
2. (Austria) Barbara Haas (second round)
3. (Netherlands) Cindy Burger (second round)
4. (Bulgaria) Isabella Shinikova (first round)
5. (France) Virginie Razzano (first round, retired)
6. (France) Myrtille Georges (second round)
7. (Serbia) Nina Stojanović (quarterfinals)
8. (Ukraine) Maryna Zanevska (champion)

== Main draw ==
=== Key ===
- Q = Qualifier
- WC = Wild card
- LL = Lucky loser
- Alt = Alternate
- SE = Special exempt
- PR = Protected ranking
- ITF = ITF entry
- JE = Junior exempt
- w/o = Walkover
- r = Retired
- d = Defaulted
- SR = Special ranking

=== Finals ===
Semifinals
1	(Spain) Sílvia Soler Espinosa	2	2
8	(Ukraine) Maryna Zanevska	6	6
Q	(Italy) Camilla Rosatello	6	6
WC	(France) Fiona Ferro	0	0

Final
8	(Ukraine) Maryna Zanevska	6	6
Q	(Italy) Camilla Rosatello	1	3

=== Top half ===
First round
1	(Spain) S Soler Espinosa	6	7^{7}
(United Kingdom) A Carreras	0	6^{4}
(Chile) D Seguel	2	6	2
Q	(Brazil) B Haddad Maia	6	3	6
(Romania) A Cadanțu	6	6
WC	(France) A Albié	2	3
(Russia) V Flink	3	7	4
5	(France) V Razzano	6	5	1^{r}
3	(Netherlands) C Burger	6^{4}	6	7
(Switzerland) C Perrin	7^{7}	3	5
(Spain) O Sáez Larra	6	4	1
(Russia) V Kamenskaya	4	6	6
Q	(Greece) E Kordolaimi	6	5	3
Q	(Italy) A Matteucci	2	7	6
(North Macedonia) L Gjorcheska	4	0
8	(Ukraine) M Zanevska	6	6

Second round
1	(Spain) S Soler Espinosa	7^{7}	6
Q	(Brazil) B Haddad Maia	6^{4}	3
(Romania) A Cadanțu	3	3
(Russia) V Flink	6	6
3	(Netherlands) C Burger	3	6	6^{5}
(Russia) V Kamenskaya	6	2	7^{7}
Q	(Italy) A Matteucci	6	1	1
8	(Ukraine) M Zanevska	4	6	6

Quarterfinals
1	(Spain) S Soler Espinosa	6	6
(Russia) V Flink	3	2
(Russia) V Kamenskaya	6^{5}	2
8	(Ukraine) M Zanevska	7^{7}	6

Semifinals
1	(Spain) S Soler Espinosa	2	2
8	(Ukraine) M Zanevska	6	6

=== Bottom half ===
First round
6	(France) M Georges	6	3	6
(Italy) A Grymalska	4	6	3
Q	(Italy) C Rosatello	6	6
WC	(France) E Thébault	3	3
PR	(France) C Feuerstein	2	2
SE	(France) C Paquet	6	6
(Czech Republic) T Smitková	6	6
4	(Bulgaria) I Shinikova	0	1
7	(Serbia) N Stojanović	6	6
(Austria) J Grabher	3	3
(Czech Republic) J Malečková	6	6
WC	(France) J Boualem	4	0
LL	(France) H Tan	2	4
WC	(France) F Ferro	6	6
(Russia) P Leykina	0	0
2	(Austria) B Haas	6	6

Second round
6	(France) M Georges	6	4	6^{5}
Q	(Italy) C Rosatello	4	6	7^{7}
SE	(France) C Paquet	7	6
(Czech Republic) T Smitková	5	1
7	(Serbia) N Stojanović	6	3	6
(Czech Republic) J Malečková	2	6	4
WC	(France) F Ferro	6	4	6
2	(Austria) B Haas	0	6	1

Quarterfinals
Q	(Italy) C Rosatello	6	6
SE	(France) C Paquet	4	2
7	(Serbia) N Stojanović	7^{7}	6^{3}	1
WC	(France) F Ferro	6^{4}	7^{7}	6

Semifinals
Q	(Italy) C Rosatello	6	6
WC	(France) F Ferro	0	0
