= 2024 Internazionali Femminili di Brescia =

Tennis tournament

- Date: 27 May–2 June 2024
- Edition: 15th
- Category: ITF Women's World Tennis Tour
- Prize money: $60,000
- Surface: Clay / Outdoor
- Location: Brescia, Italy

Champions

Singles
- (Ukraine) Katarina Zavatska

Doubles
- (Spain) Yvonne Cavallé Reimers / (Italy) Aurora Zantedeschi
← 2023 ·	Internazionali Femminili di Brescia	· 2025 →

The 2024 Internazionali Femminili di Brescia was a professional tennis tournament play on outdoor clay courts. It was the fifteenth edition of the tournament, which was part of the 2024 ITF Women's World Tennis Tour. It took place in Brescia, Italy, between 27 May and 2 June 2024.

== Champions ==
=== Singles ===
- (Ukraine) Katarina Zavatska def. (United States) Varvara Lepchenko, 6–2, 6–3

=== Doubles ===
- (Spain) Yvonne Cavallé Reimers / (Italy) Aurora Zantedeschi def. (Kazakhstan) Zhibek Kulambayeva / Ekaterina Reyngold, 3–6, 7–5, [10–6]

== Singles main draw entrants ==
=== Seeds ===
Country	Player	Rank	Seed
CZE	Dominika Šalková	151	1
GER	Ella Seidel	161	2
SLO	Veronika Erjavec	168	3
UKR	Kateryna Baindl	169	4
	Polina Kudermetova	170	5
GER	Noma Noha Akugue	177	6
USA	Ann Li	178	7
TUR	İpek Öz	195	8

- Rankings are as of 20 May 2024.

=== Other entrants ===
The following players received wildcards into the singles main draw:

- (Italy) Jessica Pieri
- (Italy) Beatrice Ricci
- (Italy) Aurora Zantedeschi
- (China) Zheng Saisai

The following player received entry as a special exempt:

- (France) Sara Cakarevic

The following players received entry from the qualifying draw:

- (Italy) Anastasia Abbagnato
- (Brazil) Gabriela Cé
- (Italy) Federica Di Sarra
- (Spain) Ángela Fita Boluda
- (Italy) Nicole Fossa Huergo
- (Colombia) Yuliana Lizarazo
- (France) Alice Ramé
- Ekaterina Reyngold
