= 2019 Internazionali Femminili di Brescia – Singles =

Singles
- 2019 Internazionali Femminili di Brescia

Final
- Champion: (Italy) Jasmine Paolini
- Runner-up: (Latvia) Diāna Marcinkēviča
- Score: 6–2, 6–1

Events
Singles	Doubles
← 2018 ·	Internazionali Femminili di Brescia	· 2022 →

Kaia Kanepi was the defending champion, but chose not to participate.

Jasmine Paolini won the title, defeating Diāna Marcinkēviča in the final, 6–2, 6–1.

== Seeds ==
1. (China) Wang Xiyu (first round)
2. (Switzerland) Conny Perrin (first round)
3. (United States) Francesca Di Lorenzo (second round)
4. (Italy) Martina Trevisan (semifinals)
5. (China) Han Xinyun (first round)
6. (France) Chloé Paquet (first round)
7. (Bulgaria) Viktoriya Tomova (first round)
8. (Netherlands) Richèl Hogenkamp (first round)

== Draw ==
=== Key ===
- Q = Qualifier
- WC = Wild card
- LL = Lucky loser
- Alt = Alternate
- SE = Special exempt
- PR = Protected ranking
- ITF = ITF entry
- JE = Junior exempt
- w/o = Walkover
- r = Retired
- d = Defaulted
- SR = Special ranking

=== Finals ===
Semifinals
(Italy) Jasmine Paolini	6	6
4	(Italy) Martina Trevisan	3	0
WC	(Italy) Deborah Chiesa	7^{7}	6^{3}	6^{6}
(Latvia) Diāna Marcinkēviča	6^{5}	7^{7}	7^{8}

Final
(Italy) Jasmine Paolini	6	6
(Latvia) Diāna Marcinkēviča	2	1

=== Top half ===
First round
1	(China) Xiy Wang	4	4
WC	(Italy) E Cocciaretto	6	6
(Italy) J Paolini	2	6	6
(Bulgaria) I Shinikova	6	1	0
Q	(Brazil) PC Gonçalves	3	4
(Hungary) A Bondár	6	6
(Liechtenstein) K von Deichmann	6	6
6	(France) C Paquet	4	2
4	(Italy) M Trevisan	6	7
Q	(Italy) F Di Sarra	3	5
(Italy) M Di Giuseppe	7^{7}	6
WC	(Italy) J Pieri	6^{3}	2
(United States) L Chirico	4	6	6
Q	(Italy) L Bronzetti	6	3	1
Q	(France) O Dodin	6	6
5	(China) X Han	4	2

Second round
WC	(Italy) E Cocciaretto	4	6^{8}
(Italy) J Paolini	6	7^{10}
(Hungary) A Bondár	2	1
(Liechtenstein) K von Deichmann	6	6
4	(Italy) M Trevisan	6	6
(Italy) M Di Giuseppe	3	4
(United States) L Chirico	6	6
Q	(France) O Dodin	3	4

Quarterfinals
(Italy) J Paolini	4	6	6
(Liechtenstein) K von Deichmann	6	3	3
4	(Italy) M Trevisan	6	7
(United States) L Chirico	4	5

Semifinals
(Italy) J Paolini	6	6
4	(Italy) M Trevisan	3	0

=== Bottom half ===
First round
8	(Netherlands) R Hogenkamp	4	6	2
(Austria) B Haas	6	3	6
(Serbia) D Radanović	6	1	5
(Turkey) P Özgen	0	6	7
WC	(Italy) D Chiesa	0
PR	(Switzerland) R Oprandi	1^{r}
WC	(Italy) S Errani	2	7^{8}	3
3	(United States) F Di Lorenzo	6	6^{6}	6
7	(Bulgaria) V Tomova	6^{5}	6	4
(Latvia) D Marcinkēviča	7^{7}	2	6
(China) S Ma	4	4
Q	(Italy) D Spiteri	6	6
(Bulgaria) S Karatantcheva	1	5
(Australia) Z Hives	6	7
Q	(Austria) J Grabher	6	2	6
2	(Switzerland) C Perrin	2	6	1

Second round
(Austria) B Haas	6	6
(Turkey) P Özgen	4	2
WC	(Italy) D Chiesa	6	6
3	(United States) F Di Lorenzo	2	2
(Latvia) D Marcinkēviča	6	6
Q	(Italy) D Spiteri	4	3
(Australia) Z Hives	6	6
Q	(Austria) J Grabher	2	3

Quarterfinals
(Austria) B Haas	6^{2}	5
WC	(Italy) D Chiesa	7^{7}	7
(Latvia) D Marcinkēviča	3	6	7^{7}
(Australia) Z Hives	6	2	6^{5}

Semifinals
WC	(Italy) D Chiesa	7^{7}	6^{3}	6^{6}
(Latvia) D Marcinkēviča	6^{5}	7^{7}	7^{8}
