= 2023 Internazionali Femminili di Brescia – Doubles =

Doubles
- 2023 Internazionali Femminili di Brescia

Final
- Champions: (Japan) Mai Hontama (Japan) Moyuka Uchijima
- Runners-up: Alena Fomina-Klotz (Australia) Olivia Tjandramulia
- Score: 6–1, 6–0

Events
Singles	Doubles
← 2022 ·	Internazionali Femminili di Brescia	· 2024 →

Nuria Brancaccio and Lisa Pigato were the defending champions but Brancaccio chose not to participate. Pigato intended to partner alongside Georgia Pedone, but withdrew before their first round match with Yuliana Lizarazo and María Paulina Pérez.

Mai Hontama and Moyuka Uchijima won the title, defeating Alena Fomina-Klotz and Olivia Tjandramulia in the final, 6–1, 6–0.

== Seeds ==
1. Alena Fomina-Klotz / (Australia) Olivia Tjandramulia (final)
2. (Colombia) Yuliana Lizarazo / (Colombia) María Paulina Pérez (semifinals)
3. (Japan) Mai Hontama / (Japan) Moyuka Uchijima (champions)
4. Sofya Lansere / Anastasia Tikhonova (first round)

== Draw ==
=== Key ===
- Q = Qualifier
- WC = Wild card
- LL = Lucky loser
- Alt = Alternate
- SE = Special exempt
- PR = Protected ranking
- ITF = ITF entry
- JE = Junior exempt
- w/o = Walkover
- r = Retired
- d = Defaulted
- SR = Special ranking

First round
1	A Fomina-Klotz (Australia) O Tjandramulia	6	7^{7}
(Brazil) R Pereira (Argentina) J Riera	3	6^{3}
(Italy) C Catini (Italy) A Piangerelli	6^{2}	6	[10]
(Italy) V Ferrara (Italy) A Moratelli	7^{7}	3	[12]
4	S Lansere; A Tikhonova	6	4	[8]
(United States) Q Gleason (Estonia) E Malõgina	4	6	[10]
(Italy) C Gennaro (Italy) J Ruggeri	2	1
(Germany) A Klasen (Czech Republic) A Laboutková	6	6
(Czech Republic) B Palicová (Ukraine) K Zavatska
(Poland) M Kubka (Kazakhstan) Z Kulambayeva	w/o
(United States) F Di Lorenzo; P Kudermetova	6^{2}	3
3	(Japan) M Hontama (Japan) M Uchijima	7^{7}	6
(United States) H Baptiste (United States) W Osuigwe
(Greece) D Papamichail (Mexico) M Zacarías	w/o
(Italy) G Pedone (Italy) L Pigato
2	(Colombia) Y Lizarazo (Colombia) MP Pérez	w/o

Quarterfinals
1	A Fomina-Klotz (Australia) O Tjandramulia	6	6
(Italy) V Ferrara (Italy) A Moratelli	3	4
(United States) Q Gleason (Estonia) E Malõgina	7	4	[13]
(Germany) A Klasen (Czech Republic) A Laboutková	5	6	[15]
(Poland) M Kubka (Kazakhstan) Z Kulambayeva	4	4
3	(Japan) M Hontama (Japan) M Uchijima	6	6
(Greece) D Papamichail (Mexico) M Zacarías
2	(Colombia) Y Lizarazo (Colombia) MP Pérez	w/o

Semifinals
1	A Fomina-Klotz (Australia) O Tjandramulia	2	6	[10]
(Germany) A Klasen (Czech Republic) A Laboutková	6	3	[4]
3	(Japan) M Hontama (Japan) M Uchijima	7	6
2	(Colombia) Y Lizarazo (Colombia) MP Pérez	5	4

Final
1	A Fomina-Klotz (Australia) O Tjandramulia	1	0
3	(Japan) M Hontama (Japan) M Uchijima	6	6
