= 2019 Internazionali Femminili di Brescia – Doubles =

Doubles
- 2019 Internazionali Femminili di Brescia

Final
- Champions: (Venezuela) Andrea Gámiz (Brazil) Paula Cristina Gonçalves
- Runners-up: (Italy) Anastasia Grymalska (Italy) Giorgia Marchetti
- Score: 6–3, 4–6, [12–10]

Events
Singles	Doubles
← 2018 ·	Internazionali Femminili di Brescia	· 2022 →

Cristina Dinu and Ganna Poznikhirenko were the defending champions, but lost to Andrea Gámiz and Paula Cristina Gonçalves in the quarterfinals.

Gámiz and Gonçalves won the title, defeating Anastasia Grymalska and Giorgia Marchetti in the final, 6–3, 4–6, [12–10].

== Seeds ==
1. (France) Elixane Lechemia / (India) Prarthana Thombare (first round)
2. (Italy) Anastasia Grymalska / (Italy) Giorgia Marchetti (final)
3. (Romania) Cristina Dinu / (Ukraine) Ganna Poznikhirenko (quarterfinals)
4. (Hungary) Anna Bondár / (Hungary) Réka Luca Jani (semifinals)

== Draw ==
=== Key ===
- Q = Qualifier
- WC = Wild card
- LL = Lucky loser
- Alt = Alternate
- SE = Special exempt
- PR = Protected ranking
- ITF = ITF entry
- JE = Junior exempt
- w/o = Walkover
- r = Retired
- d = Defaulted
- SR = Special ranking

=== Draw ===
First round
1	(France) E Lechemia (India) P Thombare	4	6^{7}
(Italy) J Pieri (Italy) L Stefanini	6	7^{9}
(Italy) C Scala (Italy) M Spigarelli	1	3
(Italy) S Rubini (Italy) MV Viviani	6	6
3	(Romania) C Dinu (Ukraine) G Poznikhirenko	6	6
(Italy) E Cocciaretto (Spain) E Guerrero Álvarez	3	0
(Venezuela) A Gámiz (Brazil) PC Gonçalves	4	6	[10]
(Italy) D Chiesa (Italy) J Paolini	6	3	[7]
(United States) L Chirico (United States) F Di Lorenzo	7^{7}	3	[7]
(Italy) M Caregaro (Italy) F Di Sarra	6^{4}	6	[10]
(China) S Ma (Bulgaria) I Shinikova	6	6^{5}	[6]
4	(Hungary) A Bondár (Hungary) RL Jani	2	7^{7}	[10]
(Brazil) N Kurata (Italy) D Spiteri	1	6	[8]
(Italy) F Bilardo (Italy) T Pieri	6	3	[10]
(Switzerland) C Perrin (Serbia) D Radanović	2	2
2	(Italy) A Grymalska (Italy) G Marchetti	6	6

Quarterfinals
(Italy) J Pieri (Italy) L Stefanini	7	6
(Italy) S Rubini (Italy) MV Viviani	5	1
3	(Romania) C Dinu (Ukraine) G Poznikhirenko	6	2	[6]
(Venezuela) A Gámiz (Brazil) PC Gonçalves	1	6	[10]
(Italy) M Caregaro (Italy) F Di Sarra	4	3
4	(Hungary) A Bondár (Hungary) RL Jani	6	6
(Italy) F Bilardo (Italy) T Pieri	3	6^{5}
2	(Italy) A Grymalska (Italy) G Marchetti	6	7^{7}

Semifinals
(Italy) J Pieri (Italy) L Stefanini	6^{4}	2
(Venezuela) A Gámiz (Brazil) PC Gonçalves	7^{7}	6
4	(Hungary) A Bondár (Hungary) RL Jani	6^{5}	6	[9]
2	(Italy) A Grymalska (Italy) G Marchetti	7^{7}	2	[11]

Final
(Venezuela) A Gámiz (Brazil) PC Gonçalves	6	4	[12]
2	(Italy) A Grymalska (Italy) G Marchetti	3	6	[10]
