= 2018 L'Open 35 de Saint-Malo – Doubles =

Doubles
- 2018 L'Open 35 de Saint-Malo

Final
- Champions: (Spain) Cristina Bucșa (Colombia) María Fernanda Herazo
- Runners-up: (Romania) Alexandra Cadanțu (Latvia) Diāna Marcinkēviča
- Score: 4–6, 6–1, [10–8]

Events
Singles	Doubles
← 2017 ·	L'Open 35 de Saint-Malo	· 2019 →

Diāna Marcinkēviča and Daniela Seguel were the defending champions, but Seguel chose not to participate.

Marcinkēviča partnered alongside Alexandra Cadanțu, but lost in the final to Cristina Bucșa and María Fernanda Herazo, 4–6, 6–1, [10–8].

== Seeds ==
1. (Romania) Alexandra Cadanțu / (Latvia) Diāna Marcinkēviča (final)
2. (Romania) Irina Bara / (Russia) Valentyna Ivakhnenko (semifinals, withdrew)
3. (Paraguay) Verónica Cepede Royg / (Russia) Irina Khromacheva (semifinals)
4. (Spain) Cristina Bucșa / (Colombia) María Fernanda Herazo (champions)

== Draw ==
=== Key ===
- Q = Qualifier
- WC = Wild card
- LL = Lucky loser
- Alt = Alternate
- SE = Special exempt
- PR = Protected ranking
- ITF = ITF entry
- JE = Junior exempt
- w/o = Walkover
- r = Retired
- d = Defaulted
- SR = Special ranking

First round
(Brazil) N Kurata (Brazil) E Piai	1	5
(France) M Georges (France) H Tan	6	7

Quarterfinals
1	(Romania) A Cadanțu (Latvia) D Marcinkēviča	6	6
(Belgium) C Chantraine (Bulgaria) E Kostova	4	4
3	(Paraguay) V Cepede Royg (Russia) I Khromacheva	6	6
(France) C Sireix (France) L Wargnier	2	1
(France) M Georges (France) H Tan	2	3
4	(Spain) C Bucșa (Colombia) MF Herazo	6	6
(Spain) A Bolsova Zadoinov (Spain) G Maristany
2	(Romania) I Bara (Russia) V Ivakhnenko	w/o

Semifinals
1	(Romania) A Cadanțu (Latvia) D Marcinkēviča	6	6
3	(Paraguay) V Cepede Royg (Russia) I Khromacheva	1	2
4	(Spain) C Bucșa (Colombia) MF Herazo	w/o
2	(Romania) I Bara (Russia) V Ivakhnenko

Final
1	(Romania) A Cadanțu (Latvia) D Marcinkēviča	6	1	[8]
4	(Spain) C Bucșa (Colombia) MF Herazo	4	6	[10]
