= 2026 Internazionali Femminili di Brescia – Singles =

Singles
- 2026 Internazionali Femminili di Brescia

Final
- Champion: (Egypt) Mayar Sherif
- Runner-up: (China) Wang Xiyu
- Score: 6–4, 6–3

Events
Singles	Doubles
- Internazionali Femminili di Brescia

Mayar Sherif won the singles title at the 2026 Internazionali Femminili di Brescia, defeating Wang Xiyu in the final, 6–4, 6–3.

Kaja Juvan was the reigning champion, but chose to compete in Nottingham qualifying instead.

== Seeds ==
1. (China) Wang Xiyu (final)
2. (Latvia) Darja Semeņistaja (withdrew)
3. (Austria) Julia Grabher (second round)
4. (Egypt) Mayar Sherif (champion)
5. (Argentina) Jazmín Ortenzi (second round)
6. (France) Tiantsoa Rakotomanga Rajaonah (quarterfinals)
7. (China) You Xiaodi (first round)
8. (Argentina) Luisina Giovannini (quarterfinals)
9. (Italy) Nuria Brancaccio (first round)

== Draw ==
Key

- Q = Qualifier
- WC = Wild card
- LL = Lucky loser
- Alt = Alternate
- ITF = ITF entry
- PR = Protected ranking
- SR = Special ranking
- SE = Special exempt
- JE = Junior exempt
- JR = Junior Accelerator Programme entrant
- CO = College Accelerator Programme entrant
- NG = Next Gen Accelerator Program entrant
- w/o = Walkover
- r = Retired
- d = Defaulted

=== Finals ===
Semifinals
1	(China) Wang Xiyu	6	6
(Ukraine) Anastasiia Sobolieva	2	2
4	(Egypt) Mayar Sherif	6	6
(Bulgaria) Elizara Yaneva	3	3

Final
1	(China) Wang Xiyu	4	3
4	(Egypt) Mayar Sherif	6	6

=== Top half ===
First round
1	(China) Xiy Wang	6	6
(China) X Gao	3	0
(France) C Monnet	7	7^{7}
(Italy) M Trevisan	5	6^{5}
D Astakhova	2	6	6
LL	(Italy) N Basiletti	6	1	3
WC	(Italy) A Mazzola	7^{7}	1	4
8	(Argentina) L Giovannini	6^{3}	6	6
3	(Austria) J Grabher	6	6
Q	(France) C Paquet	2	2
(Liechtenstein) K von Deichmann	6	4	1
(Ukraine) A Sobolieva	4	6	6
WC	(Montenegro) D Kovinić	4	3
(Romania) M Bulgaru	6	6
(Spain) A Mintegi del Olmo	1	6	6
7	(China) X You	6	4	1

Second round
1	(China) Xiy Wang	6	6
(France) C Monnet	3	1
D Astakhova	3	1
8	(Argentina) L Giovannini	6	6
3	(Austria) J Grabher	2	6	5
(Ukraine) A Sobolieva	6	4	7
(Romania) M Bulgaru	4	2
(Spain) A Mintegi del Olmo	6	6

Quarterfinals
1	(China) Xiy Wang	6	6
8	(Argentina) L Giovannini	2	1
(Ukraine) A Sobolieva	7^{7}	6
(Spain) A Mintegi del Olmo	6^{4}	3

Semifinals
1	(China) Xiy Wang	6	6
(Ukraine) A Sobolieva	2	2

=== Bottom half ===
First round
6	(France) T Rakotomanga Rajaonah	6	6
WC	(Colombia) Y Lizarazo	0	2
Q	(Serbia) M Ristić	7	3	6
Q	(Italy) D Chiesa	5	6	4
Q	(Italy) J Ruggeri	1	6	6
(Romania) ER Bertea	6	4	1
(Cyprus) R Șerban	1	6^{5}
4	(Egypt) M Sherif	6	7^{7}
5	(Argentina) J Ortenzi	6	6
WC	(Italy) F Pace	3	3
(Bulgaria) E Yaneva	6	6
(Italy) G Pedone	3	3
(France) F Ferro	6	4	6
(Sweden) K Rinaldo Persson	2	6	3
(Georgia (country)) E Gorgodze	4	6	7^{7}
9	(Italy) N Brancaccio	6	2	6^{3}

Second round
6	(France) T Rakotomanga Rajaonah	6^{6}	6	6
Q	(Serbia) M Ristić	7^{8}	3	1
Q	(Italy) J Ruggeri	6	3	3
4	(Egypt) M Sherif	3	6	6
5	(Argentina) J Ortenzi	2	1
(Bulgaria) E Yaneva	6	6
(France) F Ferro	6^{3}	6	4
(Georgia (country)) E Gorgodze	7^{7}	2	6

Quarterfinals
6	(France) T Rakotomanga Rajaonah	2	2
4	(Egypt) M Sherif	6	6
(Bulgaria) E Yaneva	2	6	6
(Georgia (country)) E Gorgodze	6	1	2

Semifinals
4	(Egypt) M Sherif	6	6
(Bulgaria) E Yaneva	3	3

== Qualifying ==
=== Seeds ===
1. (Italy) Jennifer Ruggeri (qualified)
2. (Serbia) Mia Ristić (qualified)
3. (Czech Republic) Julie Štruplová (first round)
4. (France) Chloé Paquet (qualified)
5. (Italy) Noemi Basiletti (qualifying competition, lucky loser)
6. (Italy) Diletta Cherubini (first round)
7. (Hungary) Amarissa Tóth (qualifying competition)
8. (Italy) Deborah Chiesa (qualified)

=== Qualifiers ===
1. (Italy) Jennifer Ruggeri
2. (Serbia) Mia Ristić
3. (Italy) Deborah Chiesa
4. (France) Chloé Paquet

=== Lucky loser ===
1. (Italy) Noemi Basiletti

=== Qualifying draw ===
==== First qualifier ====
First round
1	(Italy) Jennifer Ruggeri	5	6	6
(Ukraine) Yelyzaveta Kotliar	7	2	4
(Italy) Tatiana Pieri	6	6^{4}	6
6	(Italy) Diletta Cherubini	1	7^{7}	3

Qualifying competition
1	(Italy) Jennifer Ruggeri	6	6
(Italy) Tatiana Pieri	4	2

==== Second qualifier ====
First round
2	(Serbia) Mia Ristić	6	6
(Italy) Verena Meliss	0	2
(Slovakia) Radka Zelníčková	3	5
5	(Italy) Noemi Basiletti	6	7

Qualifying competition
2	(Serbia) Mia Ristić	6	6
5	(Italy) Noemi Basiletti	2	3

==== Third qualifier ====
First round
3	(Czech Republic) Julie Štruplová	4	1
Ekaterina Kazionova	6	6
(Croatia) Lucija Ćirić Bagarić	0	2
8	(Italy) Deborah Chiesa	6	6

Qualifying competition
Ekaterina Kazionova	6	2	2
8	(Italy) Deborah Chiesa	3	6	6

==== Fourth qualifier ====
First round
4	(France) Chloé Paquet	7	6
(United States) Amy Zhu	5	1
(Belgium) Lara Salden	6^{6}	2^{r}
7	(Hungary) Amarissa Tóth	7^{8}	2

Qualifying competition
4	(France) Chloé Paquet	6	6
7	(Hungary) Amarissa Tóth	4	3
