= 2026 Internazionali Femminili di Brescia =

- Date: 15–21 June
- Edition: 17th
- Category: WTA 125
- Prize money: €100,000
- Surface: Clay / Outdoor
- Location: Brescia, Italy
- Venue: Circolo di Via Paolo Signorini 10

Champions

Singles
- (Egypt) Mayar Sherif

Doubles
- (Slovenia) Dalila Jakupović / (Slovenia) Nika Radišić
- Internazionali Femminili di Brescia

The 2026 Internazionali Femminili di Brescia was a professional women's tennis tournament played on outdoor clay courts. It was the seventeenth edition of the tournament, and first as a WTA 125 event which was also part of the 2026 WTA 125 Circuit, upgraded from the ITF Women's World Tennis Tour. It took place in Brescia, Italy, between 15 and 21 June 2026.

== Singles main draw entrants ==
=== Seeds ===
Country	Player	Rank	Seed
CHN	Wang Xiyu	100	1
~~LAT~~	~~Darja Semeņistaja~~	~~102~~	~~2~~
AUT	Julia Grabher	116	3
EGY	Mayar Sherif	118	4
ARG	Jazmín Ortenzi	159	5
FRA	Tiantsoa Rakotomanga Rajaonah	162	6
CHN	You Xiaodi	170	7
ARG	Luisina Giovannini	173	8
ITA	Nuria Brancaccio	177	9

- Rankings are as of 8 June 2026.

=== Other entrants ===
The following players received wildcards into the singles main draw:

- (Montenegro) Danka Kovinić
- (Colombia) Yuliana Lizarazo
- (Italy) Alessandra Mazzola
- (Italy) Francesca Pace

The following player received entry into the main draw through protected ranking:

- (Italy) Martina Trevisan

The following players received entry from the qualifying draw:

- (Italy) Deborah Chiesa
- (France) Chloé Paquet
- (Serbia) Mia Ristić
- (Italy) Jennifer Ruggeri

The following player received entry as a lucky loser:

- (Italy) Noemi Basiletti

=== Withdrawals ===
Before the tournament

- (Spain) Irene Burillo → replaced by (Spain) Ane Mintegi del Olmo
- (Belgium) Sofia Costoulas → replaced by (Liechtenstein) Kathinka von Deichmann
- (Slovenia) Polona Hercog → replaced by (Romania) Elena Ruxandra Bertea
- (Italy) Lisa Pigato → replaced by (Italy) Giorgia Pedone
- (Netherlands) Arantxa Rus → replaced by (Sweden) Kajsa Rinaldo Persson
- (Latvia) Darja Semeņistaja → replaced by (Italy) Noemi Basiletti (LL)
- (Slovakia) Rebecca Šramková → replaced by (Cyprus) Raluca Șerban
- Anastasia Zolotareva → replaced by Darya Asakhova

== Doubles main draw entrants ==
=== Seeds ===
Country	Player	Country	Player	Rank^{1}	Seed
TPE	Cho I-hsuan	TPE	Cho Yi-tsen	188	1
SLO	Dalila Jakupović	SLO	Nika Radišić	207	2
USA	Catherine Harrison	AUS	Alexandra Osborne	290	3
CRO	Lucija Ćirić Bagarić	ARG	Nicole Fossa Huergo	292	4

- ^{1} Rankings as of 8 June 2026.

=== Other entrants ===
The following pairs received a wildcard into the doubles main draw:

- (Italy) Noemi Basiletti / (Italy) Verena Meliss

=== Withdrawals ===
- Darya Astakhova / Ekaterina Kazionova (Astakhova - dizziness)

== Finals ==
=== Singles ===
- (Egypt) Mayar Sherif def. (China) Wang Xiyu 6–4, 6–3

=== Doubles ===
- (Slovenia) Dalila Jakupović / (Slovenia) Nika Radišić def. (Romania) Irina Bara / (Switzerland) Naïma Karamoko 6–4, 7–5
