= 2024 Internazionali Femminili di Brescia – Doubles =

Doubles
- 2024 Internazionali Femminili di Brescia

Final
- Champions: (Spain) Yvonne Cavallé Reimers (Italy) Aurora Zantedeschi
- Runners-up: (Kazakhstan) Zhibek Kulambayeva; Ekaterina Reyngold
- Score: 3–6, 7–5, [10–6]

Events
Singles	Doubles
← 2023 ·	Internazionali Femminili di Brescia	· 2025 →

Mai Hontama and Moyuka Uchijima are the defending champions but Hontama chose not to participate, and Uchijima chose to compete at the French Open instead.

Yvonne Cavallé Reimers and Aurora Zantedeschi won the title, defeating Zhibek Kulambayeva and Ekaterina Reyngold in the final, 3–6, 7–5, [10–6].

== Seeds ==
1. (Colombia) Yuliana Lizarazo / (Greece) Despina Papamichail (quarterfinals)
2. (United States) Jessie Aney / (Germany) Lena Papadakis (first round)
3. (United Kingdom) Ali Collins / (Colombia) María Paulina Pérez (first round)
4. (Germany) Noma Noha Akugue / (Germany) Ella Seidel (quarterfinals)

== Draw ==
=== Key ===
- Q = Qualifier
- WC = Wild card
- LL = Lucky loser
- Alt = Alternate
- SE = Special exempt
- PR = Protected ranking
- ITF = ITF entry
- JE = Junior exempt
- w/o = Walkover
- r = Retired
- d = Defaulted
- SR = Special ranking

First round
1	(Colombia) Y Lizarazo (Greece) D Papamichail	w/o
(Italy) M Giordano; K Laskutova
(Italy) S Rocchetti (China) S Zheng	2	0
(Spain) Y Cavallé Reimers (Italy) A Zantedeschi	6	6
4	(Germany) N Noha Akugue (Germany) E Seidel	w/o
(Italy) G Pedone (Italy) L Pigato
(Hungary) A Nagy; A Zyryanova	6	6
(Italy) G Greco Lucchina (Italy) C Odorizzi	2	2
(Georgia (country)) N Dzalamidze (Ukraine) K Zavatska	6^{5}	6	[7]
(Italy) N Fossa Huergo (India) V Shinde	7^{7}	2	[10]
(Italy) A Abbagnato (Italy) B Ricci	6	7
3	(United Kingdom) A Collins (Colombia) MP Pérez	4	5
A Ibragimova; E Pridankina	4	4
(Kazakhstan) Z Kulambayeva; E Reyngold	6	6
(Italy) N Brancaccio (Portugal) F Jorge	6	6
2	(United States) J Aney (Germany) L Papadakis	4	1

Quarterfinals
1	(Colombia) Y Lizarazo (Greece) D Papamichail	5	2
(Spain) Y Cavallé Reimers (Italy) A Zantedeschi	7	6
4	(Germany) N Noha Akugue (Germany) E Seidel	6^{3}	4
(Hungary) A Nagy; A Zyryanova	7^{7}	6
(Italy) N Fossa Huergo (India) V Shinde	2
(Italy) A Abbagnato (Italy) B Ricci	5^{r}
(Kazakhstan) Z Kulambayeva; E Reyngold	6	6
(Italy) N Brancaccio (Portugal) F Jorge	2	4

Semifinals
(Spain) Y Cavallé Reimers (Italy) A Zantedeschi	6	6
(Hungary) A Nagy; A Zyryanova	0	3
(Italy) N Fossa Huergo (India) V Shinde	2	5
(Kazakhstan) Z Kulambayeva; E Reyngold	6	7

Final
(Spain) Y Cavallé Reimers (Italy) A Zantedeschi	3	7	[10]
(Kazakhstan) Z Kulambayeva; E Reyngold	6	5	[6]
