= 2022 Internazionali Femminili di Brescia – Doubles =

Doubles
- 2022 Internazionali Femminili di Brescia

Final
- Champions: (Italy) Nuria Brancaccio (Italy) Lisa Pigato
- Runners-up: (Kazakhstan) Zhibek Kulambayeva (Latvia) Diāna Marcinkēviča
- Score: 6–4, 6–1

Events
Singles	Doubles
← 2019 ·	Internazionali Femminili di Brescia	· 2023 →

Andrea Gámiz and Paula Cristina Gonçalves were the defending champions but chose not to participate.

Nuria Brancaccio and Lisa Pigato won the title, defeating Zhibek Kulambayeva and Diāna Marcinkēviča in the final, 6–4, 6–1.

== Seeds ==
1. (Chile) Bárbara Gatica / (Brazil) Rebeca Pereira (quarterfinals, withdrew)
2. (Chinese Taipei) Hsieh Yu-chieh / (Switzerland) Xenia Knoll (quarterfinals)
3. (Romania) Andreea Prisăcariu / (Italy) Camilla Rosatello (semifinals)
4. (Netherlands) Isabelle Haverlag / (Poland) Martyna Kubka (quarterfinals)

== Draw ==
=== Key ===
- Q = Qualifier
- WC = Wild card
- LL = Lucky loser
- Alt = Alternate
- SE = Special exempt
- PR = Protected ranking
- ITF = ITF entry
- JE = Junior exempt
- w/o = Walkover
- r = Retired
- d = Defaulted
- SR = Special ranking

=== Draw ===
First round
(Serbia) T Čurović (Estonia) E Malõgina	4	5
(Italy) N Brancaccio (Italy) L Pigato	6	7
(Sweden) J Saner (Bulgaria) J Terziyska	7	6
(Italy) V Ferrara (Italy) D Valente	5	4
(Italy) N Fossa Huergo (Argentina) J Ortenzi	6	6
(Colombia) Y Lizarazo (Italy) A Zantedeschi	4	4
(Kazakhstan) Z Kulambayeva (Latvia) D Marcinkēviča	6	6
(Italy) M Delai (Italy) A Raggi	1	0

Quarterfinals
1	(Chile) B Gatica (Brazil) R Pereira
(Italy) N Brancaccio (Italy) L Pigato	w/o
4	(Netherlands) I Haverlag (Poland) M Kubka	2	7	[9]
(Sweden) J Saner (Bulgaria) J Terziyska	6	5	[11]
(Italy) N Fossa Huergo (Argentina) J Ortenzi	2	4
3	(Romania) A Prisăcariu (Italy) C Rosatello	6	6
(Kazakhstan) Z Kulambayeva (Latvia) D Marcinkēviča	4	7^{7}	[10]
2	(Chinese Taipei) Y-c Hsieh (Switzerland) X Knoll	6	6^{3}	[3]

Semifinals
(Italy) N Brancaccio (Italy) L Pigato	6	6
(Sweden) J Saner (Bulgaria) J Terziyska	2	1
3	(Romania) A Prisăcariu (Italy) C Rosatello	2	1
(Kazakhstan) Z Kulambayeva (Latvia) D Marcinkēviča	6	6

Final
(Italy) N Brancaccio (Italy) L Pigato	6	6
(Kazakhstan) Z Kulambayeva (Latvia) D Marcinkēviča	4	1
