= 2026 Internazionali Femminili di Brescia – Doubles =

Doubles
- 2026 Internazionali Femminili di Brescia

Final
- Champions: (Slovenia) Dalila Jakupović (Slovenia) Nika Radišić
- Runners-up: (Romania) Irina Bara (Switzerland) Naïma Karamoko
- Score: 6–4, 7–5

Events
Singles	Doubles
- Internazionali Femminili di Brescia

Maja Chwalińska and Sinja Kraus were the reigning champions, but did not participate this year.

Dalila Jakupović and Nika Radišić won the title, defeating Irina Bara and Naïma Karamoko 6–4, 7–5 in the final.

== Seeds ==
1. (Chinese Taipei) Cho I-hsuan / (Chinese Taipei) Cho Yi-tsen (semifinals)
2. (Slovenia) Dalila Jakupović / (Slovenia) Nika Radišić (champions)
3. (United States) Catherine Harrison / (Australia) Alexandra Osborne (quarterfinals)
4. (Croatia) Lucija Ćirić Bagarić / (Argentina) Nicole Fossa Huergo (semifinals)

== Draw ==
Key

- Q = Qualifier
- WC = Wild card
- LL = Lucky loser
- Alt = Alternate
- ITF = ITF entry
- PR = Protected ranking
- SR = Special ranking
- SE = Special exempt
- JE = Junior exempt
- JR = Junior Accelerator Programme entrant
- CO = College Accelerator Programme entrant
- NG = Next Gen Accelerator Program entrant
- w/o = Walkover
- r = Retired
- d = Defaulted

=== Draw ===
First round
1	(Chinese Taipei) I-h Cho (Chinese Taipei) Y-t Cho	6	6
(Spain) Y Cavallé Reimers (Belgium) L Salden	1	4
(Czech Republic) J Štruplová (Slovakia) R Zelníčková	4	6	[10]
(Czech Republic) A Kučmová (Czech Republic) A Laboutková	6	2	[5]
3	(United States) C Harrison (Australia) A Osborne	7	6
WC	(Italy) N Basiletti (Italy) V Meliss	5	2
(Romania) I Bara (Switzerland) N Karamoko	6	6
(Japan) H Kuwata (Netherlands) L Tran	3	2
(Australia) G Da Silva-Fick (Australia) T McGiffin	6	6
(United States) J Daniel (India) P Thombare	3	2
(China) Y Dang (China) X You	6	1	[9]
4	(Croatia) L Ćirić Bagarić (Argentina) N Fossa Huergo	1	6	[11]
D Astakhova; E Kazionova
(United States) R McAdoo (France) C Monnet	w/o
(Italy) A Moratelli (Italy) F Pace	3	2
2	(Slovenia) D Jakupović (Slovenia) N Radišić	6	6

Quarterfinals
1	(Chinese Taipei) I-h Cho (Chinese Taipei) Y-t Cho	6	7
(Czech Republic) J Štruplová (Slovakia) R Zelníčková	4	5
3	(United States) C Harrison (Australia) A Osborne	3	5
(Romania) I Bara (Switzerland) N Karamoko	6	7
(Australia) G Da Silva-Fick (Australia) T McGiffin	6	5	[10]
4	(Croatia) L Ćirić Bagarić (Argentina) N Fossa Huergo	3	7	[12]
(United States) R McAdoo (France) C Monnet	2	2
2	(Slovenia) D Jakupović (Slovenia) N Radišić	6	6

Semifinals
1	(Chinese Taipei) I-h Cho (Chinese Taipei) Y-t Cho	6	4	[6]
(Romania) I Bara (Switzerland) N Karamoko	2	6	[10]
4	(Croatia) L Ćirić Bagarić (Argentina) N Fossa Huergo	3	5
2	(Slovenia) D Jakupović (Slovenia) N Radišić	6	7

Final
(Romania) I Bara (Switzerland) N Karamoko	4	5
2	(Slovenia) D Jakupović (Slovenia) N Radišić	6	7
