= 2024 Internazionali Femminili di Brescia – Singles =

Singles
- 2024 Internazionali Femminili di Brescia

Final
- Champion: (Ukraine) Katarina Zavatska
- Runner-up: (United States) Varvara Lepchenko
- Score: 6–2, 6–3

Events
Singles	Doubles
- Internazionali Femminili di Brescia

Katarina Zavatska successfully defended her title, defeating Varvara Lepchenko in the final, 6–2, 6–3.

== Seeds ==
1. (Czech Republic) Dominika Šalková (second round)
2. (Germany) Ella Seidel (quarterfinals)
3. (Slovenia) Veronika Erjavec (second round, retired)
4. (Ukraine) Kateryna Baindl (quarterfinals)
5. Polina Kudermetova (semifinals)
6. (Germany) Noma Noha Akugue (second round)
7. (United States) Ann Li (semifinals)
8. (Turkey) İpek Öz (second round, retired)

== Draw ==
Key

- Q = Qualifier
- WC = Wild card
- LL = Lucky loser
- Alt = Alternate
- ITF = ITF entry
- PR = Protected ranking
- SR = Special ranking
- SE = Special exempt
- JE = Junior exempt
- JR = Junior Accelerator Programme entrant
- CO = College Accelerator Programme entrant
- NG = Next Gen Accelerator Program entrant
- w/o = Walkover
- r = Retired
- d = Defaulted

=== Finals ===
Semifinals
7	(United States) Ann Li	6^{6}	6	2
(United States) Varvara Lepchenko	7^{8}	3	6
(Ukraine) Katarina Zavatska	3	6	6
5	Polina Kudermetova	6	4	2

Final
(United States) Varvara Lepchenko	2	3
(Ukraine) Katarina Zavatska	6	6

=== Top half ===
First round
1	(Czech Republic) D Šalková	6	0
SE	(France) S Cakarevic	3	0^{r}
(Italy) N Brancaccio	6	1	6
(Portugal) F Jorge	4	6	4
Q	(Spain) Á Fita Boluda	6	6
WC	(Italy) J Pieri	0	1
Q	(Italy) F Di Sarra	4	6	3
7	(United States) A Li	6	1	6
3	(Slovenia) V Erjavec	6	6
(Israel) L Glushko	3	2
Q	E Reyngold	4	6	2
Q	(France) A Ramé	6	4	6
(United States) V Lepchenko	6	6
(Italy) G Pedone	0	3
WC	(Italy) A Zantedeschi	6^{5}	1
8	(Turkey) İ Öz	7^{7}	6

Second round
1	(Czech Republic) D Šalková	6	4	6^{3}
(Italy) N Brancaccio	4	6	7^{7}
Q	(Spain) Á Fita Boluda	3	0
7	(United States) A Li	6	6
3	(Slovenia) V Erjavec	3	6	0^{r}
Q	(France) A Ramé	6	1	0
(United States) V Lepchenko	6	3
8	(Turkey) İ Öz	1	1^{r}

Quarterfinals
(Italy) N Brancaccio	6	3	4
7	(United States) A Li	2	6	6
Q	(France) A Ramé	3	3
(United States) V Lepchenko	6	6

Semifinals
7	(United States) A Li	6^{6}	6	2
(United States) V Lepchenko	7^{8}	3	6

=== Bottom half ===
First round
6	(Germany) N Noha Akugue	6	7
E Pridankina	4	5
(Ukraine) K Zavatska	7	5	6
(Japan) S Saito	5	7	2
(United States) L Chirico	6	6
Q	(Brazil) G Cé	3	2
WC	(Italy) B Ricci	1	7^{7}	6^{8}
4	(Ukraine) K Baindl	6	6^{4}	7^{10}
5	P Kudermetova	7	6
Q	(Italy) N Fossa Huergo	5	0
Q	(Colombia) Y Lizarazo	4	2
(Italy) L Pigato	6	6
Q	(Italy) A Abbagnato	6	5	6
(Switzerland) Y In-Albon	4	7	2
WC	(China) S Zheng	2	0
2	(Germany) E Seidel	6	6

Second round
6	(Germany) N Noha Akugue	6	3	2
(Ukraine) K Zavatska	3	6	6
(United States) L Chirico	7^{7}	4	4
4	(Ukraine) K Baindl	6^{4}	6	6
5	P Kudermetova	6	6
(Italy) L Pigato	2	3
Q	(Italy) A Abbagnato	6	2	5
2	(Germany) E Seidel	3	6	7

Quarterfinals
(Ukraine) K Zavatska	2	7	6
4	(Ukraine) K Baindl	6	5	3
5	P Kudermetova	6	6
2	(Germany) E Seidel	2	1

Semifinals
(Ukraine) K Zavatska	3	6	6
5	P Kudermetova	6	4	2
