= Internazionali Femminili di Brescia =

- 2026 Internazionali Femminili di Brescia

WTA 125
- Location: Brescia, Italy
- Venue: TC Forza e Costanza
- Category: WTA 125
- Surface: Clay
- Draw: 32S/16Q/16D
- Prize money: €100,000
- Website: Official website

Current champions (2026)
- Singles: (Egypt) Mayar Sherif
- Doubles: (Slovenia) Dalila Jakupović (Slovenia) Nika Radišić

The Internazionali Femminili di Brescia is a tournament for professional female tennis players played on outdoor clay courts. The event is classified as a WTA 125 event since 2026 after being upgraded from $60,000 ITF Women's Circuit tournament and has been held in Brescia, Italy, since 2008.

== Past finals ==
=== Singles ===
Year	Champion	Runner-up	Score
2026	(Egypt) Mayar Sherif	(China) Wang Xiyu	6–4, 6–3
↑ WTA 125 ↑
2025	(Slovenia) Kaja Juvan	(Austria) Julia Grabher	7–6^{(7–1)}, 7–5
2024	(Ukraine) Katarina Zavatska (2)	(United States) Varvara Lepchenko	6–2, 6–3
2023	(Ukraine) Katarina Zavatska	Yuliya Hatouka	6–4, 6–2
2022	(Spain) Ángela Fita Boluda	(Greece) Despina Papamichail	6–2, 6–0
2020–21	Tournament cancelled due to the COVID-19 pandemic		
2019	(Italy) Jasmine Paolini	(Latvia) Diāna Marcinkēviča	6–2, 6–1
2018	(Estonia) Kaia Kanepi	(Italy) Martina Trevisan	6–4, 6–3
2017	(Slovenia) Polona Hercog	(Ukraine) Ganna Poznikhirenko	6–2, 7–5
2016	(Italy) Karin Knapp	(Czech Republic) Jesika Malečková	6–1, 6–2
2015	(Liechtenstein) Stephanie Vogt	(Venezuela) Andrea Gámiz	7–6^{(7–3)}, 6–4
2014	(Belarus) Aliaksandra Sasnovich	(Czech Republic) Renata Voráčová	6–4, 6–1
2013	(Switzerland) Viktorija Golubic	(Italy) Anastasia Grymalska	6–4, 6–4
2012	(Slovakia) Anna Karolína Schmiedlová	(Spain) Beatriz García Vidagany	6–3, 6–2
2011	(Ukraine) Irina Buryachok	(Italy) Giulia Gatto-Monticone	6–7^{(5–7)}, 6–2, 6–2
2010	(United Kingdom) Naomi Cavaday	(Czech Republic) Andrea Hlaváčková	6–2, 6–4
2009	(Ukraine) Irina Buryachok	(Italy) Anna Remondina	6–3, 6–3
2008	(Italy) Lisa Sabino	(Austria) Patricia Mayr	6–3, 6–3

=== Doubles ===
Year	Champions	Runners-up	Score
2026	(Slovenia) Dalila Jakupović (Slovenia) Nika Radišić	(Romania) Irina Bara (Switzerland) Naïma Karamoko	6–4, 7–5
↑ WTA 125 ↑
2025	(Poland) Maja Chwalińska (Austria) Sinja Kraus	(Czech Republic) Gabriela Knutson (Latvia) Darja Semeņistaja	6–0, 6–3
2024	(Spain) Yvonne Cavallé Reimers (Italy) Aurora Zantedeschi	(Kazakhstan) Zhibek Kulambayeva; Ekaterina Reyngold	3–6, 7–5, [10–6]
2023	(Japan) Mai Hontama (Japan) Moyuka Uchijima	Alena Fomina-Klotz (Australia) Olivia Tjandramulia	6–1, 6–0
2022	(Italy) Nuria Brancaccio (Italy) Lisa Pigato	(Kazakhstan) Zhibek Kulambayeva (Latvia) Diāna Marcinkēviča	6–4, 6–1
2020–21	Tournament cancelled due to the COVID-19 pandemic		
2019	(Venezuela) Andrea Gámiz (Brazil) Paula Cristina Gonçalves	(Italy) Anastasia Grymalska (Italy) Giorgia Marchetti	6–3, 4–6, [12–10]
2018	(Romania) Cristina Dinu (Ukraine) Ganna Poznikhirenko	(Russia) Alexandra Panova (Russia) Anastasia Pribylova	6–3, 7–6^{(8–6)}
2017	(Israel) Julia Glushko (Australia) Priscilla Hon	(Paraguay) Montserrat González (Belarus) Ilona Kremen	2–6, 7–6^{(7–4)}, [10–8]
2016	(Italy) Deborah Chiesa (Italy) Martina Colmegna	(Netherlands) Cindy Burger (Liechtenstein) Stephanie Vogt	6–3, 1–6, [12–10]
2015	(Germany) Laura Siegemund (Czech Republic) Renata Voráčová	(Argentina) María Irigoyen (Liechtenstein) Stephanie Vogt	6–2, 6–1
2014	(United States) Sanaz Marand (Argentina) Florencia Molinero	(United States) Louisa Chirico (United States) Asia Muhammad	6–4, 4–6, [10–8]
2013	(Australia) Monique Adamczak (Japan) Yurika Sema	(Hungary) Réka-Luca Jani (Russia) Irina Khromacheva	6–4, 7–5
2012	(Italy) Corinna Dentoni (Latvia) Diāna Marcinkēviča	(Croatia) Tereza Mrdeža (Slovenia) Maša Zec Peškirič	6–2, 6–1
2011	(Colombia) Karen Castiblanco (Brazil) Fernanda Hermenegildo	(Italy) Evelyn Mayr (Italy) Julia Mayr	4–6, 6–3, [10–6]
2010	(United Kingdom) Naomi Cavaday (Russia) Anastasia Pivovarova	(Belarus) Iryna Kuryanovich (Russia) Valeria Savinykh	6–3, 6–7^{(5–7)}, [10–8]
2009	(Ukraine) Irina Buryachok (Netherlands) Marlot Meddens	(Italy) Elena Pioppo (Italy) Lisa Sabino	6–4, 2–6, [14–12]
2008	(Italy) Elena Pioppo (Italy) Lisa Sabino	(Italy) Elisa Belleri (Italy) Agnese Zucchini	3–3 ret.
