= Eleni Kordolaimi =

Greek tennis player (born 1993)

Eleni Kordolaimi Ελένη Κορδολαίμη
- Country (sports): Greece
- Born: 7 March 1993 (age 32); Lamia
- Plays: Right (two-handed backhand)
- Prize money: $65,322

Singles
- Career record: 218–135
- Career titles: 5 ITF
- Highest ranking: No. 435 (10 December 2018)

Doubles
- Career record: 128–92
- Career titles: 11 ITF
- Highest ranking: No. 344 (16 July 2018)

Team competitions
- Fed Cup: 3–2

Eleni Kordolaimi (Greek: Ελένη Κορδολαίμη; born 7 March 1993) is a Greek tennis coach and former professional player.

== Career ==
Kordolaimi has career-high WTA rankings of 435 in singles, achieved on 10 December 2018, and 344 in doubles, set on 16 July 2018. In her career, she won five singles and eleven doubles titles on the ITF Circuit.

Playing for Greece Fed Cup team, Kordolaimi has a win–loss record of 3–2.

== ITF finals ==
=== Singles: 11 (5–6) ===
Legend $15,000 tournaments $10,000 tournaments	Finals by surface Hard (4–2) Clay (1–4)

Outcome	No.	Date	Tournament	Surface	Opponent	Score
Winner	1.	30 June 2014	ITF Sharm El Sheikh, Egypt	Hard	(United States) Jan Abaza	7–6^{(1)}, 3–6, 7–5
Winner	2.	10 July 2016	ITF Sharm El Sheikh, Egypt	Hard	(Romania) Ana Bianca Mihăilă	7–6^{(6)}, 6–3
Runner-up	1.	24 July 2016	ITF Sharm El Sheikh, Egypt	Hard	(Sweden) Brenda Njuki	4–6, 3–6
Runner-up	2.	24 December 2016	ITF Casablanca, Morocco	Clay	(Hungary) Panna Udvardy	4–6, 6–7^{(3)}
Runner-up	3.	4 June 2017	ITF Hammamet, Tunisia	Clay	(Italy) Lucrezia Stefanini	6–7^{(5)}, 2–6
Winner	3.	29 July 2017	ITF Sharm El Sheikh, Egypt	Hard	(Egypt) Mayar Sherif	6–4, 3–6, 6–2
Winner	4.	6 August 2017	ITF Sharm El Sheikh, Egypt	Hard	(Belarus) Nika Shytkouskaya	6–2, 6–3
Runner-up	4.	8 April 2018	ITF Hammamet, Tunisia	Clay	(United Kingdom) Tara Moore	0–6, 1–6
Runner-up	5.	3 June 2018	ITF Hammamet, Tunisia	Clay	(Slovenia) Pia Cuk	5–7, 3–6
Winner	5.	10 June 2018	ITF Hammamet, Tunisia	Clay	(France) Alice Rame	6–1, 7–5
Runner-up	6.	23 October 2022	ITF Monastir, Tunisia	Hard	(Belgium) Hanne Vandewinkel	3–6, 6–1, 1–6

=== Doubles: 24 (11–13) ===
Legend $25,000 tournaments $15,000 tournaments $10,000 tournaments	Finals by surface Hard (8–8) Clay (3–4) Grass (0–1)

Outcome	No.	Date	Tournament	Surface	Partner	Opponents	Score
Runner-up	1.	20 May 2013	ITF Athens, Greece	Hard	(Greece) Despoina Vogasari	(Belarus) Sviatlana Pirazhenka (Netherlands) Gabriela van de Graaf	6–1, 5–7, [7–10]
Winner	1.	31 May 2014	ITF Sharm El Sheikh, Egypt	Hard	(Sweden) Susanne Celik	(United Kingdom) Sabrina Bamburac (Spain) Arabela Fernandez Rabener	6–1, 7–6^{(2)}
Winner	2.	7 June 2014	ITF Sharm El Sheikh	Hard	(Sweden) Susanne Celik	(Romania) Elena-Teodora Cadar (Spain) Arabela Fernandez Rabener	7–5, 6–2
Runner-up	2.	6 July 2014	ITF Sharm El Sheikh	Hard	(Greece) Despoina Vogasari	(United States) Jan Abaza (Egypt) Ola Abou Zekry	4–6, 6–3, [7–10]
Runner-up	3.	31 May 2015	ITF Sharm El Sheikh	Hard	(Romania) Elena-Teodora Cadar	(Italy) Alice Matteucci (Greece) Despina Papamichail	3–6, 4–6
Runner-up	4.	28 June 2015	ITF Sharm El Sheikh	Hard	(Egypt) Ola Abou Zekry	(India) Prarthana Thombare (Netherlands) Eva Wacanno	4–6, 6–7^{(5)}
Runner-up	5.	5 July 2015	ITF Sharm El Sheikh	Hard	(Egypt) Ola Abou Zekry	(Germany) Luisa Marie Huber (Germany) Amalie Intert	2–6, 6–2, [7–10]
Runner-up	6.	13 February 2016	ITF Hammamet, Tunisia	Clay	(Moldova) Alexandra Perper	(Italy) Anastasia Grymalska (Belgium) Déborah Kerfs	w/o
Runner-up	7.	15 May 2016	ITF Sharm El Sheikh	Hard	(Sweden) Anette Munazova	(Russia) Anna Morgina (Australia) Sara Tomic	3–6, 2–6
Runner-up	8.	29 May 2016	ITF Sharm El Sheikh	Hard	(India) Eetee Maheta	(Egypt) Ola Abou Zekry (Ukraine) Kateryna Sliusar	2–6, 2–6
Runner-up	9.	3 July 2016	ITF Sharm El Sheikh	Hard	(Romania) Ana Bianca Mihăilă	(Egypt) Ola Abou Zekry (India) Sharmada Balu	6–2, 3–6, [5–10]
Winner	3.	10 July 2016	ITF Sharm El Sheikh	Hard	(Ukraine) Kateryna Sliusar	(United Kingdom) Mirabelle Njoze (India) Shweta Chandra Rana	6–2, 7–5
Winner	4.	31 July 2016	ITF Sharm El Sheikh	Hard	(India) Shweta Chandra Rana	(Egypt) Ola Abou Zekry (Ukraine) Kateryna Sliusar	4–6, 7–5, [10–5]
Runner-up	10.	18 February 2017	ITF Hammamet, Tunisia	Clay	(Belarus) Sviatlana Pirazhenka	(Slovakia) Vivien Juhászová (Kazakhstan) Kamila Kerimbayeva	6–3, 4–6, [8–10]
Runner-up	11.	17 July 2017	ITF Imola, Italy	Carpet	(Australia) Seone Mendez	(Spain) Estrella Cabeza Candela (Brazil) Paula Cristina Gonçalves	3–6, 6–1, [3–10]
Winner	5.	5 November 2017	ITF Sunderland, England	Hard (i)	(United Kingdom) Maia Lumsden	(United Kingdom) Alicia Barnett (United Kingdom) Sarah Beth Grey	2–6, 6–2, [11–9]
Runner-up	12.	15 December 2017	ITF Antalya, Turkey	Clay	(Bosnia and Herzegovina) Jasmina Tinjić	(Ukraine) Maryna Chernyshova (Russia) Alina Silich	3–6, 7–6^{(3)}, [8–10]
Runner-up	13.	16 March 2018	ITF São José dos Campos, Brazil	Clay	(Peru) Dominique Schaefer	(Brazil) Carolina Alves (Brazil) Thaisa Grana Pedretti	4–6, 1–6
Winner	6.	14 April 2018	ITF Sharm El Sheikh, Egypt	Hard	(United Kingdom) Tara Moore	(India) Rutuja Bhosale (India) Kanika Vaidya	6–4, 6–1
Winner	7.	2 June 2018	ITF Hammamet, Tunisia	Clay	(France) Alice Rame	(Slovenia) Pia Cuk (Belgium) Eliessa Vanlangendonck	6–3, 6–2
Winner	8.	9 June 2018	ITF Hammamet, Tunisia	Clay	(France) Alice Rame	(Netherlands) Merel Hoedt (Belgium) Eliessa Vanlangendonck	6–2, 6–2
Winner	9.	29 June 2018	ITF Périgueux, France	Clay	(France) Elixane Lechemia	(Spain) Cristina Bucșa (Colombia) María Herazo González	6–4, 3–6, [11–9]
Winner	10.	11 January 2019	ITF Fort-de-France, Martinique	Hard	(France) Alice Tubello	(United Kingdom) Emily Appleton (United States) Dalayna Hewitt	6–3, 5–7, [10–4]
Winner	11.	6 November 2022	ITF Monastir, Tunisia	Hard	(Egypt) Merna Refaat	(France) Océane Babel (France) Manon Léonard	6–3, 0–6, [10–8]
