= Diāna Marcinkēviča =

Latvian tennis player (born 1992)

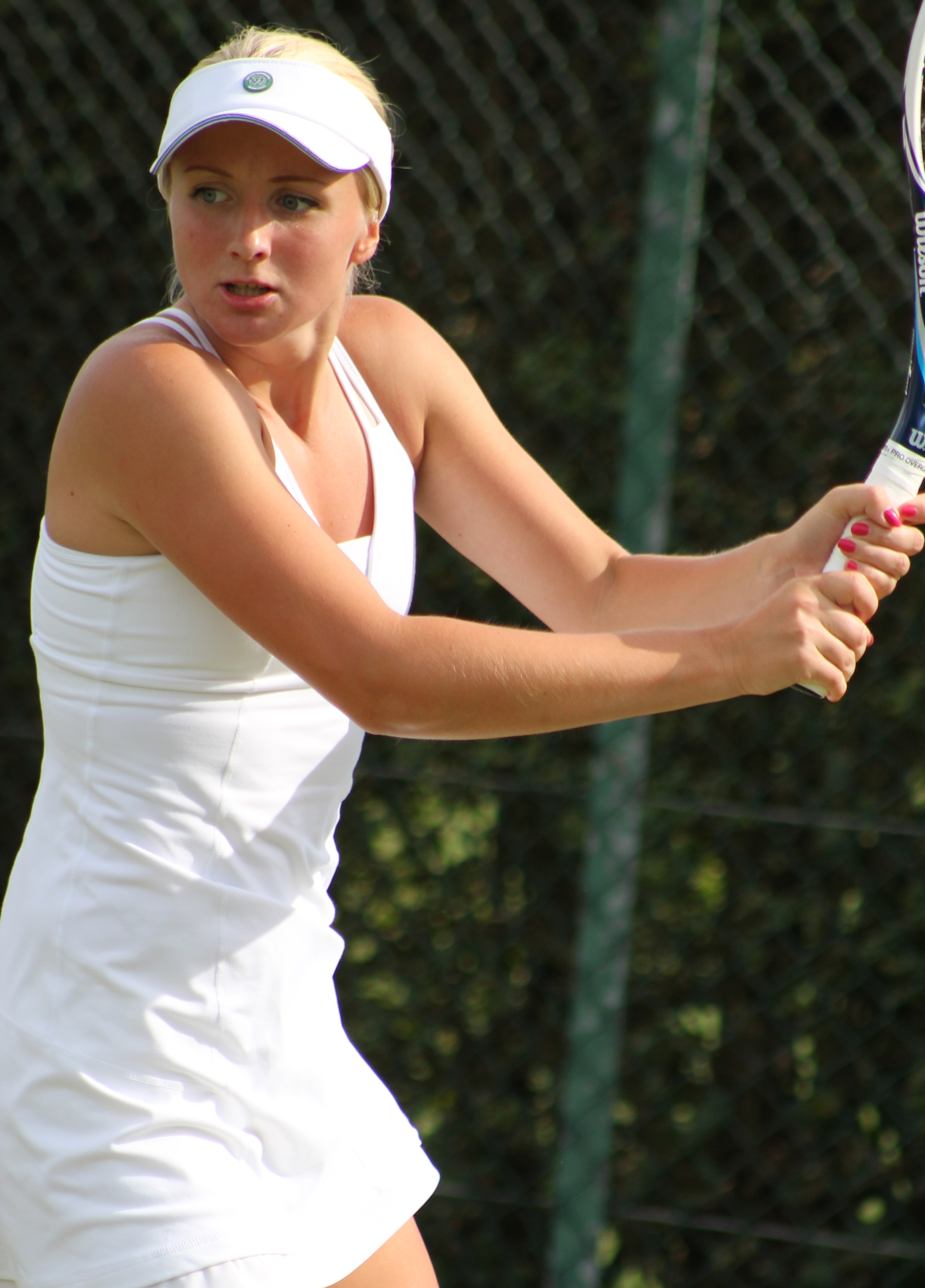
- At the 2014 Wimbledon qualifying tournament
- Country (sports): Latvia
- Born: 3 August 1992 (age 34) Riga, Latvia
- Height: 1.70 m (5 ft 7 in)
- Plays: Right (two-handed backhand)
- Prize money: $391,024

Singles
- Career record: 547–521
- Career titles: 8 ITF
- Highest ranking: No. 196 (28 April 2014)
- Current ranking: No. 891 (14 September 2026)

Grand Slam singles results
- Australian Open: Q1 (2014)
- French Open: Q1 (2014)
- Wimbledon: Q1 (2014)
- US Open: Q1 (2014, 2019)

Doubles
- Career record: 408–369
- Career titles: 31 ITF
- Highest ranking: No. 146 (26 May 2014)
- Current ranking: No. 978 (14 September 2026)

Team competitions
- Fed Cup: 24–32
- Last updated on: 15 September 2026.

Diāna Marcinkēviča,(born 3 August 1992) is a tennis player from Latvia.

Marcinkēviča has won eight singles and 31 doubles titles on the ITF Women's Circuit. On 28 April 2014, she reached her best singles ranking of world No. 196. On 26 May 2014, she peaked at No. 146 in the WTA doubles rankings.

Playing for Latvia Fed Cup team, she has a win–loss record of 24–32, as of August 2026.

== Career ==
Marcinkēviča recorded her first win on the WTA Tour as a wildcard entrant at the 2019 Baltic Open when she beat wildcard Kamilla Rakhimova, in straight sets.

== ITF Circuit finals ==
=== Singles: 21 (8 titles, 13 runner-ups) ===
Legend $60,000 tournaments (0–2) $25,000 tournaments (4–7) $10,000 tournaments (4–4)	Finals by surface Hard (7–8) Clay (1–4) Carpet (0–1)

Result	W–L	Date	Tournament	Tier	Surface	Opponent	Score
Win	1–0	Aug 2009	ITF Tallinn, Estonia	10k	Hard	(Belarus) Anna Orlik	2–6, 7–5, 7–6^{(9)}
Loss	1–1	Oct 2010	ITF Monastir, Tunisia	10k	Hard	(Slovakia) Jana Čepelová	2–6, 2–6
Loss	1–2	Mar 2011	ITF Fällanden, Switzerland	10k	Carpet (i)	(Switzerland) Myriam Casanova	3–6, 4–6
Win	2–2	May 2011	ITF Petroupoli, Greece	10k	Hard	(Greece) Despina Papamichail	5–7, 7–5, 6–3
Loss	2–3	Mar 2012	ITF Dijon, France	10k	Hard (i)	(Ukraine) Maryna Zanevska	4–6, 4–6
Loss	2–4	Jul 2012	ITF Woking, England	25k	Hard	(Germany) Sarah Gronert	2–6, 3–6
Win	3–4	Jul 2013	ITF Wrexham, Wales	25k	Hard	(Serbia) Jovana Jakšić	5–7, 7–5, 6–2
Loss	3–5	Aug 2013	ITF Fleurus, Belgium	25k	Clay	(Netherlands) Arantxa Rus	3–6, 2–6
Win	4–5	Oct 2014	ITF Victoria, Mexico	25k	Hard	(Spain) Paula Badosa	6–7^{(2)}, 6–3, 6–1
Loss	4–6	Apr 2016	ITF Heraklion, Greece	10k	Hard	(Italy) Nastassja Burnett	4–6, 6–7^{(4)}
Win	5–6	Apr 2016	ITF Heraklion, Greece	10k	Hard	(France) Sara Cakarevic	6–1, 6–3
Win	6–6	Dec 2016	ITF Solapur, India	10k	Hard	(Russia) Anastasia Gasanova	6–3, 7–6^{(4)}
Loss	6–7	Sep 2017	Open de Saint-Malo, France	60k+H	Clay	(Slovenia) Polona Hercog	3–6, 3–6
Win	7–7	Nov 2018	ITF Wirral, England	25k	Hard	(Netherlands) Arantxa Rus	7–6^{(2)}, 0–6, 7–6^{(4)}
Loss	7–8	Dec 2018	ITF Navi Mumbai, India	25k	Hard	(Austria) Barbara Haas	6–0, 3–6, 5–7
Loss	7–9	Jun 2019	Internazionali di Brescia, Italy	W60	Clay	(Italy) Jasmine Paolini	2–6, 1–6
Loss	7–10	Sep 2019	Verbier Open, Switzerland	W25	Clay	(Netherlands) Indy de Vroome	6–3, 3–6, 6–7^{(2)}
Loss	7–11	Dec 2021	ITF Pune, India	W25	Hard	(Japan) Moyuka Uchijima	2–6, 5–7
Loss	7–12	Dec 2021	ITF Navi Mumbai, India	W25	Hard	(Russia) Ekaterina Reyngold	3–6, 2–6
Win	8–12	Aug 2023	Verbier Open, Switzerland	W25	Clay	(Switzerland) Conny Perrin	6–3, 6–4>
Loss	8–13	Nov 2023	ITF Ortisei, Italy	W25	Hard (i)	(Germany) Mona Barthel	2–6, 7–6^{(6)}, 4–6

=== Doubles: 75 (31 titles, 44 runner-ups) ===
Legend $100,000 tournaments (0–2) $75,000 tournaments (0–1) $50/60,000 tournaments (2–7) $25/35,000 tournaments (16–28) $10/15,000 tournaments (13–6)	Finals by surface Hard (15–20) Clay (14–21) Carpet (2–3)

Result	W–L	Date	Tournament	Tier	Surface	Partner	Opponents	Score
Loss	0–1	Aug 2008	ITF Savitaipale, Finland	10,000	Clay	(Russia) Ekaterina Prozorova	(Denmark) Hanne Skak Jensen (Belgium) Davinia Lobbinger	1–6, 3–6
Win	1–1	Sep 2008	ITF Mytilene, Greece	10,000	Hard	(Russia) Renata Bakieva	(Greece) Eirini Georgatou (Australia) Jade Hopper	6–1, 6–3
Loss	1–2	Jul 2009	ITF Gaziantep, Turkey	10,000	Hard	(Ukraine) Yuliana Umanets	(Uzbekistan) Nigina Abduraimova (Australia) Jade Hopper	3–6, 7–6^{(6)}, [11–13]
Win	2–2	Aug 2009	ITF Savitaipale, Finland	10,000	Clay	(Belarus) Anna Orlik	(Denmark) Malou Ejdesgaard (Israel) Ester Masuri	4–6, 6–2, [10–5]
Win	3–2	Aug 2009	ITF Tallinn, Estonia	10,000	Hard	(Belarus) Anna Orlik	(Australia) Jade Hopper (South Africa) Lisa Marshall	6–1, 0–6, [10–7]
Win	4–2	Jul 2010	ITF Tampere, Finland	10,000	Clay	(Latvia) Irina Kuzmina	(France) Amandine Hesse (Czech Republic) Monika Tůmová	6–4, 6–2
Win	5–2	Aug 2010	ITF Savitaipale, Finland	10,000	Clay	(Russia) Alexandra Artamonova	(Norway) Nina Munch-Søgaard (Finland) Katariina Tuohimaa	6–2, 6–3
Win	6–2	Sep 2010	ITF Larissa, Greece	10,000	Hard	(Russia) Alexandra Artamonova	(Romania) Claudia-Gianina Dumitrescu (Russia) Diana Isaeva	6–1, 6–1
Loss	6–3	May 2011	ITF Petroupoli, Greece	10,000	Hard	(Russia) Alexandra Artamonova	(Germany) Kim Grajdek (Czech Republic) Zuzana Linhová	6–3, 3–6, [6–10]
Win	7–3	May 2011	ITF Rethymno, Greece	10,000	Hard	(Russia) Alexandra Artamonova	(United Kingdom) Anna Fitzpatrick (United Kingdom) Jade Windley	6–2, 6–3
Win	8–3	Jan 2012	ITF Sunderland, UK	25,000	Hard (i)	(Poland) Justyna Jegiołka	(Italy) Martina Caciotti (Italy) Anastasia Grymalska	6–4, 2–6, [10–6]
Win	9–3	Feb 2012	ITF Bron, France	10,000	Hard (i)	(Greece) Despina Papamichail	(Germany) Justine Ozga (Bulgaria) Isabella Shinikova	7–5, 7–5
Win	10–3	Mar 2012	ITF Dijon, France	10,000	Hard (i)	(Greece) Despina Papamichail	(Russia) Yana Sizikova (Belgium) Alison Van Uytvanck	7–5, 7–6^{(7)}
Win	11–3	May 2012	Internazionali di Brescia, Italy	25,000	Clay	(Italy) Corinna Dentoni	(Croatia) Tereza Mrdeža (Slovenia) Maša Zec Peškirič	6–2, 6–1
Loss	11–4	Aug 2012	ITF Charleroi, Belgium	25,000	Clay	(Belarus) Ilona Kremen	(France) Séverine Beltrame (France) Laura Thorpe	6–3, 4–6, [7–10]
Win	12–4	Sep 2012	ITF Clermont-Ferrand, France	25,000	Hard (i)	(Netherlands) Bibiane Schoofs	(United Kingdom) Samantha Murray (United Kingdom) Jade Windley	6–3, 6–0
Loss	12–5	Oct 2012	Open de Touraine, France	50,000	Hard (i)	(Poland) Justyna Jegiołka	(France) Séverine Beltrame (France) Julie Coin	5–7, 4–6
Win	13–5	Oct 2012	GB Pro-Series Glasgow, UK	25,000	Hard (i)	(Poland) Justyna Jegiołka	(Italy) Nicole Clerico (Germany) Anna Zaja	6–2, 6–1
Loss	13–6	Oct 2012	GB Pro-Series Barnstaple, UK	75,000	Hard (i)	(Belarus) Aliaksandra Sasnovich	(Uzbekistan) Akgul Amanmuradova (Serbia) Vesna Dolonc	3–6, 1–6
Win	14–6	Apr 2013	Chiasso Open, Switzerland	25,000	Clay	(Belarus) Aliaksandra Sasnovich	(Italy) Nicole Clerico (Italy) Giulia Gatto-Monticone	6–7^{(2)}, 6–4, [10–7]
Loss	14–7	May 2013	Grado Tennis Cup, Italy	25,000	Clay	(Switzerland) Viktorija Golubic	(Japan) Yurika Sema (China) Zhou Yimiao	6–1, 5–7, [7–10]
Loss	14–8	Jun 2013	ITF Lenzerheide, Switzerland	25,000	Clay	(Russia) Veronika Kudermetova	(Switzerland) Belinda Bencic (Czech Republic) Kateřina Siniaková	0–6, 2–6
Loss	14–9	Aug 2013	ITF Westende, Belgium	25,000	Hard	(Germany) Antonia Lottner	(Argentina) Tatiana Búa (Chile) Daniela Seguel	3–6, 7–5, [9–11]
Win	15–9	Aug 2013	ITF Fleurus, Belgium	25,000	Clay	(Russia) Irina Khromacheva	(Brazil) Gabriela Cé (Chile) Daniela Seguel	6–4, 6–3
Loss	15–10	Nov 2013	ITF Équeurdreville, France	25,000	Hard (i)	(Netherlands) Eva Wacanno	(Switzerland) Timea Bacsinszky (Germany) Kristina Barrois	4–6, 3–6
Loss	15–11	Nov 2013	ITF Zawada, Poland	25,000	Carpet (i)	(Poland) Justyna Jegiołka	(Czech Republic) Nikola Fraňková (Czech Republic) Tereza Smitková	1–6, 6–2, [8–10]
Loss	15–12	Dec 2013	ITF Navi Mumbai, India	25,000	Hard	(Georgia (country)) Oksana Kalashnikova	(United Kingdom) Jocelyn Rae (United Kingdom) Anna Smith	4–6, 6–7^{(5)}
Win	16–12	Apr 2014	Wiesbaden Open, Germany	25,000	Clay	(Switzerland) Viktorija Golubic	(Israel) Julia Glushko (Luxembourg) Mandy Minella	6–4, 6–3
Loss	16–13	Sep 2014	GB Pro-Series Barnstaple, UK	25,000	Hard (i)	(Switzerland) Viktorija Golubic	(France) Alizé Lim (Germany) Carina Witthöft	2–6, 1–6
Loss	16–14	Jul 2015	ITF Turin, Italy	25,000	Clay	(Sweden) Susanne Celik	(Switzerland) Xenia Knoll (Italy) Alice Matteucci	2–6, 5–7
Win	17–14	Jul 2015	ITF Aschaffenburg, Germany	25,000	Clay	(Ukraine) Alyona Sotnikova	(Ukraine) Alona Fomina (Ukraine) Sofiya Kovalets	3–6, 6–4, [10–5]
Loss	17–15	Oct 2015	ITF Florence, United States	25,000	Hard	(United States) Chiara Scholl	(Bosnia and Herzegovina) Ema Burgić Bucko (United States) Keri Wong	6–7^{(6)}, 1–6
Loss	17–16	Mar 2016	ITF Le Havre, France	10,000	Clay (i)	(Spain) Georgina García Pérez	(United States) Bernarda Pera (United States) Sabrina Santamaria	2–6, 2–6
Win	18–16	Sep 2016	Open de Saint-Malo, France	50,000+H	Clay	(North Macedonia) Lina Gjorcheska	(Romania) Alexandra Cadanțu (Romania) Jaqueline Cristian	3–6, 6–3, [10–8]
Win	19–16	Nov 2016	ITF Zawada, Poland	25,000	Carpet (i)	(Poland) Justyna Jegiołka	(Belarus) Ilona Kremen (Belarus) Vera Lapko	6–4, 7–5
Win	20–16	Mar 2017	ITF Mâcon, France	15,000	Hard (i)	(Belarus) Ilona Kremen	(Italy) Alice Matteucci (Italy) Camilla Rosatello	6–7^{(5)}, 7–6^{(1)}, [10–4]
Loss	20–17	Mar 2017	ITF Amiens, France	15,000	Clay (i)	(Belarus) Ilona Kremen	(Italy) Camilla Rosatello (Norway) Melanie Stokke	4–6, 1–6
Win	21–17	Mar 2017	ITF Gonesse, France	15,000	Clay (i)	(Belarus) Ilona Kremen	(Ukraine) Ganna Poznikhirenko (Russia) Ekaterina Yashina	6–1, 6–4
Win	22–17	Apr 2017	ITF Dijon, France	15,000	Hard (i)	(Switzerland) Rebeka Masarova	(France) Victoria Muntean (Ukraine) Anastasia Zarycká	6–4, 6–3
Loss	22–18	May 2017	Wiesbaden Open, Germany	25,000	Clay	(Switzerland) Rebeka Masarova	(Germany) Vivian Heisen (Australia) Storm Sanders	5–7, 7–5, [8–10]
Loss	22–19	May 2017	ITF Caserta, Italy	25,000	Clay	(Italy) Camilla Rosatello	(Italy) Deborah Chiesa (Italy) Martina Colmegna	6–7^{(5)}, 4–6
Loss	22–20	Aug 2017	ITF Braunschweig, Germany	25,000	Clay	(Russia) Anastasiya Komardina	(Sweden) Cornelia Lister (Spain) María Teresa Torró Flor	6–3, 6–7^{(5)}, [9–11]
Win	23–20	Sep 2017	ITF Balatonboglár, Hungary	25,000	Clay	(Russia) Irina Khromacheva	(Hungary) Ágnes Bukta (Slovakia) Vivien Juhászová	6–4, 6–3
Win	24–20	Sep 2017	Open de Saint-Malo, France (2)	60,000	Clay	(Chile) Daniela Seguel	(Romania) Irina Bara (Romania) Mihaela Buzărnescu	6–3, 6–3
Win	25–20	Dec 2017	ITF Navi Mumbai, India	25,000	Hard	(Spain) Georgina García Pérez	(India) Pranjala Yadlapalli (Slovenia) Tamara Zidanšek	6–0, 6–1
Win	26–20	Feb 2018	AK Ladies Open, Germany	25,000	Carpet (i)	(Poland) Katarzyna Piter	(Greece) Valentini Grammatikopoulou (Belgium) Maryna Zanevska	w/o
Loss	26–21	Mar 2018	ITF Mâcon, France	15,000	Hard (i)	(France) Manon Arcangioli	(France) Mathilde Armitano (France) Elixane Lechemia	1–6, 6–3, [8–10]
Loss	26–22	Jun 2018	Bredeney Ladies Open, Germany	25,000	Clay	(South Africa) Chanel Simmonds	(Germany) Katharina Gerlach (Germany) Julia Wachaczyk	4–6, 6–2, [6–10]
Loss	26–23	Aug 2018	ITF Braunschweig, Germany	25,000	Clay	(Sweden) Cornelia Lister	(Czech Republic) Anastasia Zarycká (Germany) Julia Wachaczyk	4–6, 6–3, [9–11]
Loss	26–24	Sep 2018	Open de Saint-Malo, France	60,000	Clay	(Romania) Alexandra Cadanțu	(Spain) Cristina Bucșa (Colombia) María Herazo González	6–4, 1–6, [8–10]
Loss	26–25	Oct 2018	ITF Óbidos, Portugal	25,000	Carpet	(Hungary) Panna Udvardy	(Serbia) Natalija Kostic (Japan) Akiko Omae	3–6, 6–4, [7–10]
Loss	26–26	Oct 2018	ITF Óbidos, Portugal	25,000	Carpet	(Spain) Cristina Bucșa	(Netherlands) Michaëlla Krajicek (United States) Ingrid Neel	2–6, 2–6
Loss	26–27	Jun 2019	ITF Périgueux, France	W25	Clay	(Colombia) María Herazo González	(Chile) Bárbara Gatica (Brazil) Rebeca Pereira	4–6, 2–6
Loss	26–28	Nov 2019	ITF Bhopal, India	W25	Hard	(Ukraine) Valeriya Strakhova	(India) Rutuja Bhosale (United Kingdom) Emily Webley-Smith	4–6, 5–7
Win	27–28	Jul 2021	ITF Contamines, France	W25	Hard	(United States) Chiara Scholl	(Argentina) María Carlé (Switzerland) Ylena In-Albon	3–6, 6–2, [10–7]
Loss	27–29	Aug 2021	Verbier Open, Switzerland	W25	Clay	(Russia) Maria Timofeeva	(Russia) Erika Andreeva (Russia) Ekaterina Makarova	6–7^{(2)}, 1–6
Win	28–29	Oct 2021	Lagos Ladies Open, Portugal	W25	Hard	(China) Yuan Yue	(Czech Republic) Miriam Kolodziejová (Czech Republic) Jesika Malečková	w/o
Win	29–29	Dec 2021	ITF Navi Mumbai, India	W25	Hard	(Kazakhstan) Zhibek Kulambayeva	(Kazakhstan) Anna Danilina (Ukraine) Valeriya Strakhova	6–3, 4–6, [10–6]
Loss	29–30	Mar 2022	ITF Le Havre, France	W25	Clay	(United States) Chiara Scholl	(Spain) Cristina Bucșa (Spain) Georgina García Pérez	4–6, 3–6
Loss	29–31	Jun 2022	Internazionali di Brescia, Italy	W60	Clay	(Kazakhstan) Zhibek Kulambayeva	(Italy) Nuria Brancaccio (Italy) Lisa Pigato	4–6, 1–6
Loss	29–32	Sep 2022	ITF Trieste, Italy	W25	Clay	(Croatia) Lucija Ćirić Bagarić	(Slovenia) Nika Radišić (China) Lu Jiajing	5–7, 6–3, [13–15]
Loss	29–33	Oct 2022	Trnava Indoor, Slovakia	W60	Hard (i)	(Switzerland) Conny Perrin	(Georgia (country)) Mariam Bolkvadze (United Kingdom) Maia Lumsden	2–6, 3–6
Win	30–33	Feb 2023	ITF Jhajjar, India	W15	Clay	(Sweden) Fanny Östlund	(India) Vaidehi Chaudhari (India) Zeel Desai	6–2, 6–1
Loss	30–34	Jun 2022	ITF Poertschach, Austria	W25	Clay	(Romania) Elena-Teodora Cadar	(Poland) Weronika Falkowska (United States) Sofia Sewing	1–6, 2–6
Loss	30–35	Jul 2023	Open Araba en Femenino, Spain	W100	Hard	(France) Estelle Cascino	(United Kingdom) Alicia Barnett (United Kingdom) Olivia Nicholls	3–6, 4–6
Loss	30–36	Jul 2023	ITF El Espinar, Spain	W25	Hard	(South Korea) Ku Yeon-woo	(United States) Rasheeda McAdoo (Australia) Alexandra Osborne	4–6, 3–6
Loss	30–37	Aug 2023	ITF Barcelona, Spain	W60	Hard	(France) Estelle Cascino	(India) Prarthana Thombare (Russia) Anastasia Tikhonova	6–3, 1–6, [7–10]
Loss	30–38	Aug 2023	Collonge-Bellerive Open, Switzerland	W60	Clay	(France) Estelle Cascino	(Switzerland) Conny Perrin (Czech Republic) Anna Sisková	6–7^{(4)}, 1–6
Loss	30–39	Oct 2023	ITF Faro, Portugal	W25	Hard	(Greece) Sapfo Sakellaridi	(Ukraine) Maryna Kolb (Ukraine) Nadiia Kolb	4–6, 3–6
Loss	30–40	Apr 2024	ITF Bujumbura, Burundi	W35	Clay	(Switzerland) Naïma Karamoko	(Latvia) Kamilla Bartone (Burundi) Sada Nahimana	6–4, 3–6, [7–10]
Loss	30–41	May 2024	ITF Platja d'Aro, Spain	W35	Clay	(Portugal) Matilde Jorge	(Greece) Eleni Christofi (Latvia) Daniela Vismane	4–6, 2–6
Loss	30–42	Jul 2024	Open Araba en Femenino, Spain	W100	Hard	(Bulgaria) Lia Karatancheva	(France) Estelle Cascino (Philippines) Alex Eala	3–6, 6–2, [4–10]
Win	31–42	Aug 2024	Verbier Open, Switzerland	W35	Clay	(United States) Haley Giavara	(Algeria) Inès Ibbou (Switzerland) Naïma Karamoko	2–6, 6–3, [10–7]
Loss	31–43	Oct 2024	ITF Faro, Portugal	W35	Hard	(Bulgaria) Lia Karatancheva	(Poland) Weronika Falkowska (Netherlands) Stéphanie Visscher	4–6, 6–2, [5–10]
Loss	31–44	Oct 2024	Open Nantes Atlantique, France	W50	Hard (i)	(Burundi) Sada Nahimana	(United States) Tyra Caterina Grant (Italy) Camilla Rosatello	2–6, 1–6
