= 2011 Open GDF Suez de Bretagne – Singles =

Singles
- 2011 Open GDF Suez de Bretagne

Final
- Champion: (Romania) Sorana Cîrstea
- Runner-up: (Spain) Silvia Soler-Espinosa
- Score: 6–2, 6–2

Events
Singles	Doubles
← 2010 ·	Open GDF Suez de Bretagne	· 2012 →

Romina Oprandi was the defending champion, but chose not to participate.
Sorana Cîrstea won the tournament by defeating Silvia Soler-Espinosa in the final 6–2, 6–2.

== Seeds ==
1. (Czech Republic) Lucie Hradecká (quarterfinals)
2. (Sweden) Johanna Larsson (quarterfinals)
3. (France) Mathilde Johansson (semifinals)
4. (Spain) Laura Pous Tió (quarterfinals)
5. (Romania) Sorana Cîrstea (champion)
6. (Austria) Patricia Mayr-Achleitner (first round, retired)
7. (France) Virginie Razzano (first round)
8. (Spain) Silvia Soler-Espinosa (final)

== Main draw ==
=== Key ===
- Q = Qualifier
- WC = Wild card
- LL = Lucky loser
- Alt = Alternate
- SE = Special exempt
- PR = Protected ranking
- ITF = ITF entry
- JE = Junior exempt
- w/o = Walkover
- r = Retired
- d = Defaulted
- SR = Special ranking

=== Finals ===
Semifinals
(Switzerland) Stefanie Vögele	7	5	1
5	(Romania) Sorana Cîrstea	5	7	6
3	(France) Mathilde Johansson	3	6^{6}
8	(Spain) Silvia Soler-Espinosa	6	7^{8}

Final
5	(Romania) Sorana Cîrstea	6	6
8	(Spain) Silvia Soler-Espinosa	2	2

=== Top half ===
First round
1	(Czech Republic) L Hradecká	6	6
(Czech Republic) S Záhlavová	1	1
(Spain) L Arruabarrena-Vecino	6	6
(Ukraine) O Savchuk	4	4
Q	(Netherlands) B Schoofs	4	7^{7}	3
(Switzerland) S Vögele	6	6^{4}	6
(Russia) E Ivanova	7^{7}	4	6
7	(France) V Razzano	6^{4}	6	3
4	(Spain) L Pous Tió	6	7
(Russia) N Bratchikova	4	5
(Romania) A Cadanțu	6	6
LL	(Colombia) C Castaño	0	2
LL	(Spain) E Fernández-Brugués	6	6
(Bulgaria) E Kostova	1	2
(Spain) E Cabeza Candela	7	0	1
5	(Romania) S Cîrstea	6	6	6

Second round
(Czech Republic) L Hradecká	6	6
(Spain) L Arruabarrena-Vecino	2	2
(Switzerland) S Vögele	6	6
(Russia) E Ivanova	1	4
4	(Spain) L Pous Tió	6	6
(Romania) A Cadanțu	2	4
LL	(Spain) E Fernández-Brugués	4	3
5	(Romania) S Cîrstea	6	6

Quarterfinals
1	(Czech Republic) L Hradecká	6	3	2
(Switzerland) S Vögele	4	6	6
4	(Spain) L Pous Tió	3	1
5	(Romania) S Cîrstea	6	6

Semifinals
(Switzerland) S Vögele	7	5	1
5	(Romania) S Cîrstea	5	7	6

=== Bottom half ===
First round
6	(Austria) P Mayr-Achleitner	3	0	r
(Canada) S Fichman	6	3
Q	(Colombia) M Duque	4	7	4
(Netherlands) K Bertens	6	5	6
Q	(Germany) S Werner	6	4	6
Q	(Germany) N Zander	4	6	3
(Poland) M Linette	4	6	4
3	(France) M Johansson	6	2	6
8	(Spain) S Soler-Espinosa	7	6
(Austria) Y Meusburger	6	2
WC	(France) A Bergot	6	6
WC	(France) A Lim	1	3
WC	(France) S Beltrame	6	6
(Georgia (country)) M Chakhnashvili	1	2
WC	(France) N Piquion	3	4
2	(Sweden) J Larsson	6	6

Second round
(Canada) S Fichman	4	4
(Netherlands) K Bertens	6	6
Q	(Germany) S Werner	6	1	2
3	(France) M Johansson	4	6	6
8	(Spain) S Soler-Espinosa	6	6
WC	(France) A Bergot	3	1
WC	(France) S Beltrame	2	2
2	(Sweden) J Larsson	6	6

Quarterfinals
(Netherlands) K Bertens	1	2
3	(France) M Johansson	6	6
8	(Spain) S Soler-Espinosa	6	7^{7}
2	(Sweden) J Larsson	3	6^{4}

Semifinals
3	(France) M Johansson	3	6^{6}
8	(Spain) S Soler-Espinosa	6	7^{8}
