= 2011 Open GDF Suez de Bretagne – Doubles =

Doubles
- 2011 Open GDF Suez de Bretagne

Final
- Champions: (Russia) Nina Bratchikova (Croatia) Darija Jurak
- Runners-up: (Sweden) Johanna Larsson (Germany) Jasmin Wöhr
- Score: 6–4, 6–2

Events
Singles	Doubles
← 2010 ·	Open GDF Suez de Bretagne	· 2012 →

Petra Cetkovská and Lucie Hradecká were the defending champions, but both players chose not to participate.

Nina Bratchikova and Darija Jurak won the title, defeating Johanna Larsson and Jasmin Wöhr in the final, 6–4, 6–2.

== Seeds ==
1. (Sweden) Johanna Larsson / (Germany) Jasmin Wöhr (final)
2. (Canada) Sharon Fichman / (Ukraine) Olga Savchuk (semifinals)
3. (Russia) Nina Bratchikova / (Croatia) Darija Jurak (champions)
4. (Austria) Sandra Klemenschits / (Switzerland) Stefanie Vögele (quarterfinals)

== Draw ==
=== Key ===
- Q = Qualifier
- WC = Wild card
- LL = Lucky loser
- Alt = Alternate
- SE = Special exempt
- PR = Protected ranking
- ITF = ITF entry
- JE = Junior exempt
- w/o = Walkover
- r = Retired
- d = Defaulted
- SR = Special ranking

First round
1	(Sweden) J Larsson (Germany) J Wöhr	6	6
(Romania) D Enache (Netherlands) D Harmsen	2	2
(Netherlands) K Bertens (Netherlands) B Schoofs	2	6^{4}
(Spain) L Arruabarrena Vecino (Russia) E Ivanova	6	7^{7}
4	(Austria) S Klemenschits (Switzerland) S Vögele	6	7
(Romania) L-I Andrei (Uzbekistan) A Khabibulina	2	5
(Spain) E Cabeza Candela (Georgia (country)) M Chakhnashvili	2	2
(Colombia) C Castaño (Colombia) M Duque Mariño	6	6
(Poland) M Linette (Bulgaria) I Shinikova	6	6
WC	(Russia) J Kushnereva (United States) A Riley	0	0
WC	(Bosnia and Herzegovina) J Kajtazovič (France) G Radovanovic	1	0
3	(Russia) N Bratchikova (Croatia) D Jurak	6	6
(France) A Bergot (Bulgaria) E Kostova	6	6
WC	(Italy) N Burnett (United States) J Elie	1	2
(France) A Lim (Germany) S Werner	5	2
2	(Canada) S Fichman (Ukraine) O Savchuk	7	6

Quarterfinals
1	(Sweden) J Larsson (Germany) J Wöhr	6	6
(Spain) L Arruabarrena Vecino (Russia) E Ivanova	4	3
4	(Austria) S Klemenschits (Switzerland) S Vögele	6	4	[8]
(Colombia) C Castaño (Colombia) M Duque Mariño	3	6	[10]
(Poland) M Linette (Bulgaria) I Shinikova	1	2
3	(Russia) N Bratchikova (Croatia) D Jurak	6	6
(France) A Bergot (Bulgaria) E Kostova	6^{13}	2
2	(Canada) S Fichman (Ukraine) O Savchuk	7^{15}	6

Semifinals
1	(Sweden) J Larsson (Germany) J Wöhr	6	7^{7}
(Colombia) C Castaño (Colombia) M Duque Mariño	1	6^{5}
3	(Russia) N Bratchikova (Croatia) D Jurak	6	6
2	(Canada) S Fichman (Ukraine) O Savchuk	2	4

Finals
1	(Sweden) J Larsson (Germany) J Wöhr	4	2
3	(Russia) N Bratchikova (Croatia) D Jurak	6	6
