= 2011 Open GDF Suez de Bretagne =

- Date: 19–25 September
- Edition: 12th
- Location: Saint-Malo, France

Champions

Singles
- (Romania) Sorana Cîrstea

Doubles
- (Russia) Nina Bratchikova / (Croatia) Darija Jurak
← 2010 ·	Open GDF Suez de Bretagne	· 2012 →

The 2011 Open GDF Suez de Bretagne was a professional tennis tournament played on clay courts. It was the twelfth edition of the tournament which was part of the 2011 ITF Women's Circuit. It took place in Saint-Malo, France between 19 and 25 September 2011.

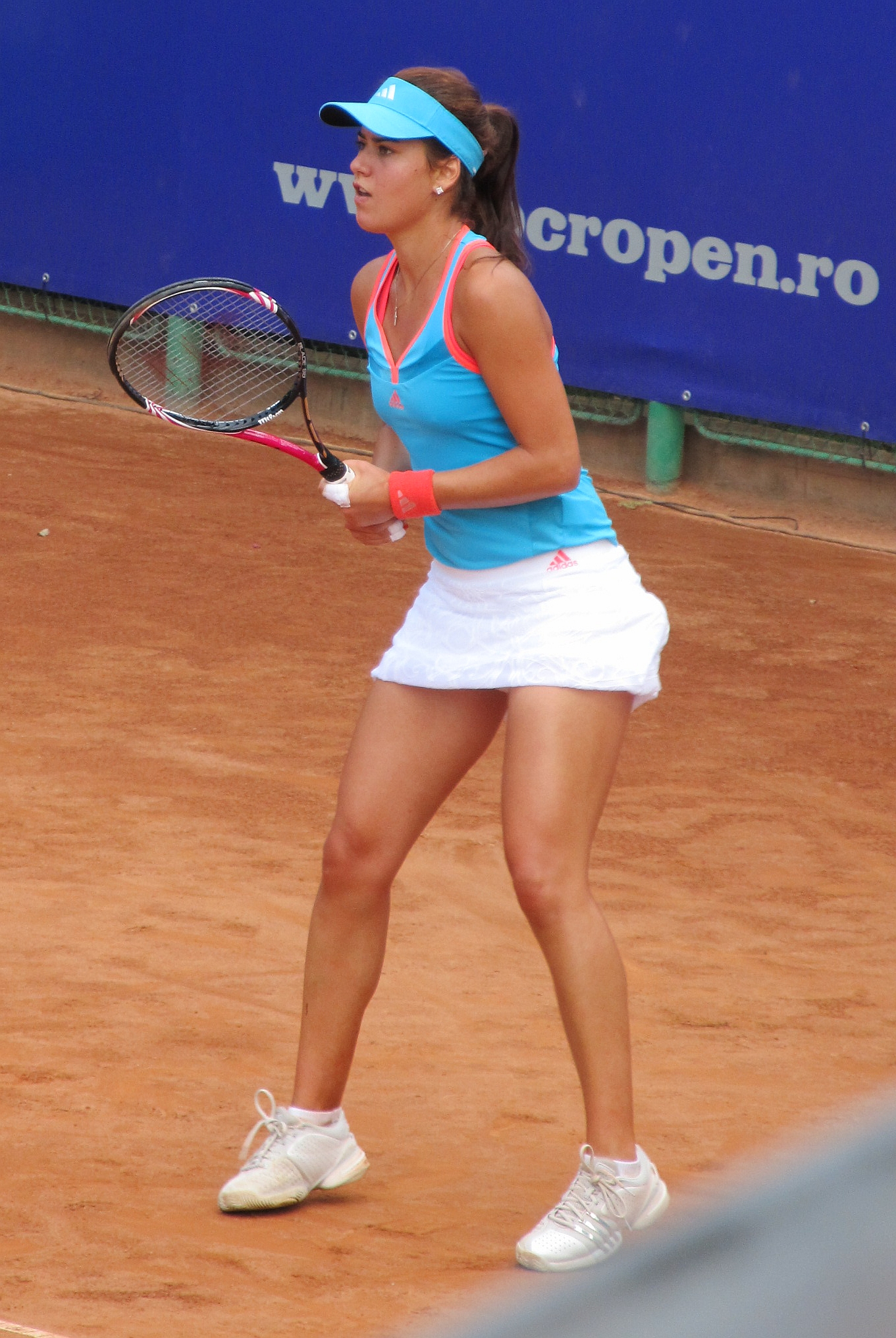
Romanian Sorana Cîrstea lifted the singles trophy

== WTA entrants ==
=== Seeds ===
Country	Player	Rank^{1}	Seed
CZE	Lucie Hradecká	51	1
SWE	Johanna Larsson	61	2
FRA	Mathilde Johansson	71	3
ESP	Laura Pous Tió	73	4
ROU	Sorana Cîrstea	92	5
AUT	Patricia Mayr-Achleitner	93	6
FRA	Virginie Razzano	98	7
ESP	Sílvia Soler Espinosa	110	8

- ^{1} Rankings are as of September 12, 2011.

=== Other entrants ===
The following players received wildcards into the singles main draw:

- (France) Séverine Beltrame
- (France) Audrey Bergot
- (France) Alizé Lim
- (France) Nathalie Piquion

The following players received entry from the qualifying draw:

- (Colombia) Mariana Duque
- (Netherlands) Bibiane Schoofs
- (Germany) Scarlett Werner
- (Germany) Nina Zander

The following players received entry by a lucky loser spot:

- (Colombia) Catalina Castaño
- (Spain) Eva Fernández-Brugués

== Champions ==
=== Singles ===
(Romania) Sorana Cîrstea def. (Spain) Sílvia Soler Espinosa, 6–2, 6–2

=== Doubles ===
(Russia) Nina Bratchikova / (Croatia) Darija Jurak def. (Sweden) Johanna Larsson / (Germany) Jasmin Wöhr, 6–4, 6–2
