= Sorana Cîrstea =

Romanian tennis player (born 1990)

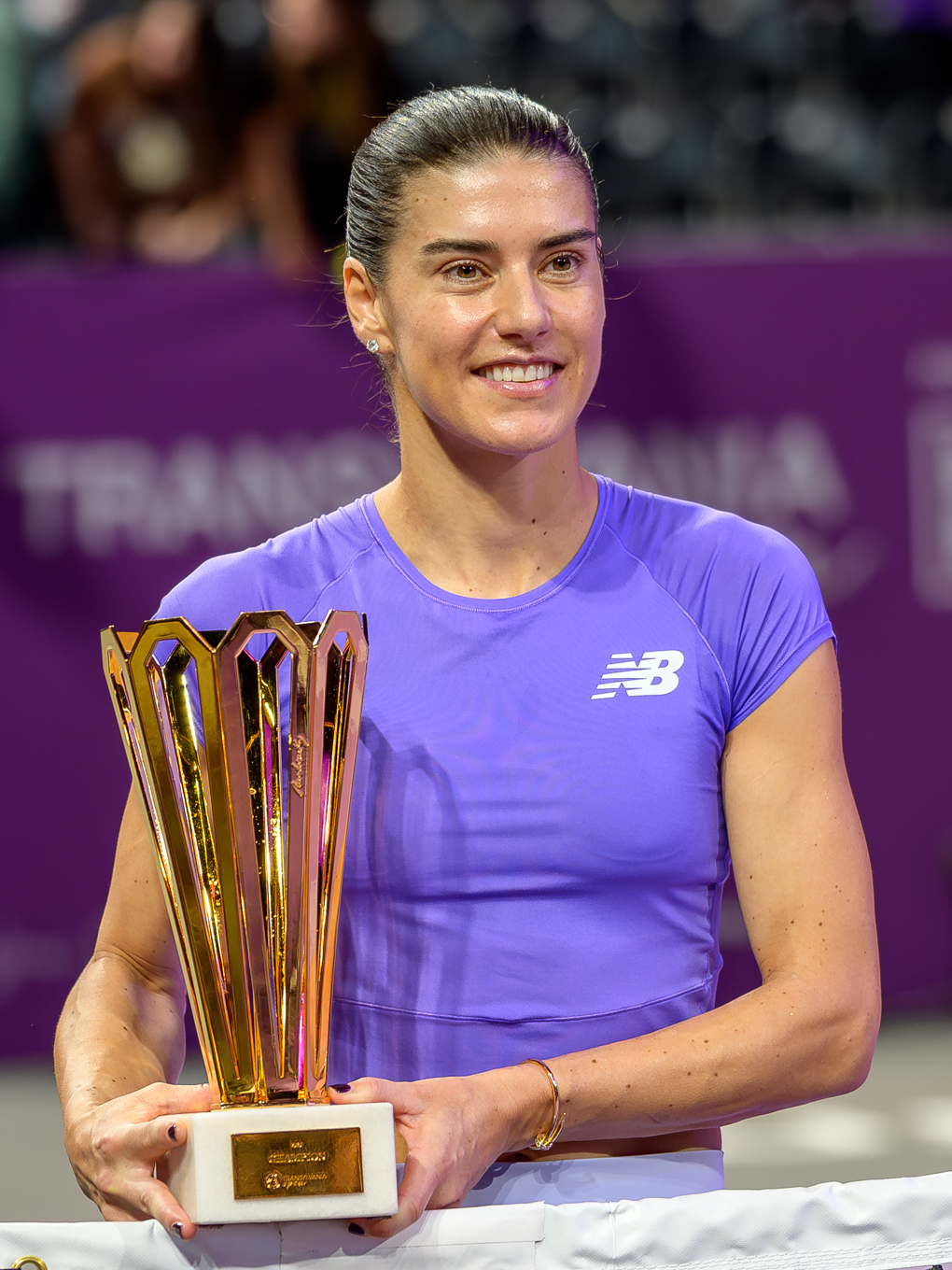
- Cîrstea at the 2026 Transylvania Open
- Country (sports): Romania
- Residence: Târgoviște, Romania
- Born: 7 April 1990 (age 36) Bucharest, Romania
- Height: 1.76 m (5 ft 9 in)
- Turned pro: 2006
- Retired: 2026
- Plays: Right-handed (two-handed backhand)
- Coach: Adrian Cruciat
- Prize money: $13,189,661

Singles
- Career record: 614–455
- Career titles: 4
- Highest ranking: No. 15 (14 September 2026)
- Current ranking: No. 16 (9 November 2026)

Grand Slam singles results
- Australian Open: 4R (2017, 2022)
- French Open: QF (2009, 2026)
- Wimbledon: 3R (2009, 2012, 2017, 2021, 2023, 2026)
- US Open: QF (2023)

Other tournaments
- Olympic Games: 1R (2008, 2012)

Doubles
- Career record: 165–135
- Career titles: 7
- Highest ranking: No. 35 (9 March 2009)
- Current ranking: No. 125 (9 November 2026)

Grand Slam doubles results
- Australian Open: 3R (2018)
- French Open: 3R (2008, 2018)
- Wimbledon: QF (2025)
- US Open: 3R (2009, 2017)

Other doubles tournaments
- Olympic Games: 1R (2012)

Team competitions
- Fed Cup: 16–13

Sorana Mihaela Cîrstea (Romanian pronunciation: [soˈrana ˈkɨrste̯a]; born 7 April 1990) is a Romanian former professional tennis player. She reached a career-high singles ranking of world No. 15 in September 2026, becoming the oldest player to debut in the singles top 15 in the WTA rankings. Cîrstea’s best results are reaching the quarterfinals at the 2009 and the 2026 French Opens and at the 2023 US Open. Her best doubles ranking is No. 35, achieved in 2009.

Cîrstea won four WTA Tour singles and seven doubles titles. Outside of the majors, her best achievements include reaching a WTA 1000 final in singles at the 2013 Rogers Cup and winning the 2025 Madrid Open doubles title with Anna Kalinskaya. Cîrstea reached the semifinals of a further three WTA 1000 events in singles. She recorded 25 career wins over top-10 players over the course of her career.

== Early and personal life ==
Sorana Cîrstea was born to Mihai and Liliana in Bucharest. She resides in Târgoviște, her parents' home town. She has a younger brother, Mihnea. Cîrstea was introduced to tennis at the age of four by her mother. Sorana's father owns an ice cream factory in Târgoviște. She has cited Steffi Graf and Roger Federer as her idols.

== Career ==
=== 2005–2006: Juniors and turning pro ===
Cîrstea is a former ITF Junior Circuit top-ten player, reaching a highest combined ranking of No. 6 in 2006. Her best results include a title in the 2005 German Junior Open (Grade 1), a tournament in which she was finalist the year before, defeating Erika Zanchetta in three sets in the final, and a runner-up place in the 2006 Trofeo Bonfiglio (Grade A), where she lost in the final to compatriot Ioana Raluca Olaru after having defeated the top-ranked world junior player Anastasia Pavlyuchenkova in the semifinals. She also made final appearances at the year-ending Grade-1 juniors tournaments, Eddie Herr International and Yucatán World Cup, in 2005 and 2006, and in the Opus Nottinghill International in 2006.

She turned professional in 2006 and ended the year at No. 353 in the WTA rankings.

=== 2007–2008: First WTA Tour title, top 40 ===
In April 2007, she reached the final of the Budapest Grand Prix, a Tier-III event, as a qualifier. All of her main draw matches went to three sets. She beat Martina Müller in the second round, Eleni Daniilidou in the quarterfinals and Karin Knapp in the semifinals before losing to Gisela Dulko in the final. She was the first Romanian to reach a WTA Tour final since Ruxandra Dragomir in June 2000. During her run, she beat two players ranked inside the top 40. The following month, Cîrstea played in the junior tournament of the 2007 French Open where she reached the doubles final with Alexa Glatch, losing to the third seeds Ksenia Milevskaya and Urszula Radwańska.

She competed for Romania in the women's singles at the 2008 Summer Olympics, losing in the first round to Shahar Pe'er. In October 2008, Cîrstea won her first WTA title in Tashkent by defeating fourth seed and world No. 64, Sabine Lisicki, in three sets. She also won her first two WTA titles in doubles that year. At the end of 2008, she was No. 36 in the WTA singles rankings and the No. 1 Romanian, aged only 18 years.

=== 2009: French Open quarterfinals ===
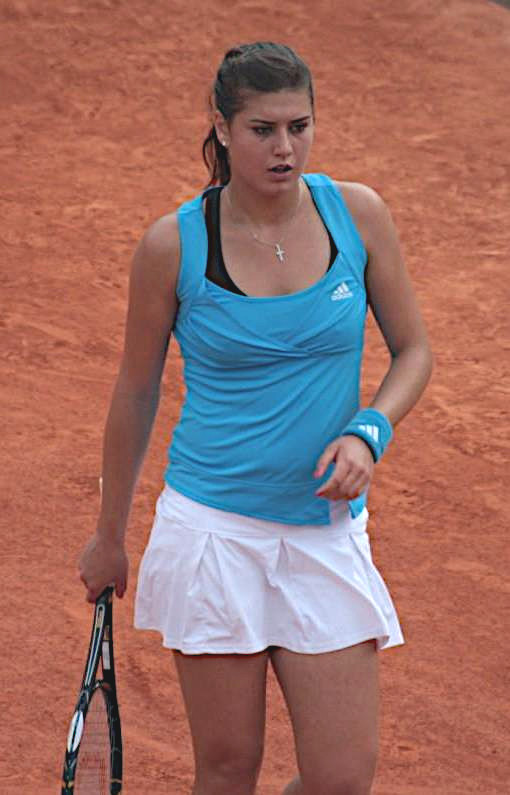
Cirstea at the 2009 French Open

Cîrstea began new season by losing to Dinara Safina at the Sydney International, in straight sets. In the doubles tournament, she partnered Vera Dushevina and reached the second round, defeating Kuznetsova/Petrova before losing to Black/Huber. At the Australian Open, she lost in the first singles round to Melinda Czink, but reached the second round of the doubles with Monica Niculescu, defeating Ditty/Gullickson and losing to Dechy/Santangelo.

Cîrstea lost in the first rounds of the Open GdF Suez and Dubai Championships, to Nathalie Dechy and Dominika Cibulková respectively. In doubles, she again partnered Monica Niculescu in Suez, reaching the semifinals before injury forced them to lose in a walkover to Peschke/Raymond. In Dubai, she partnered Arina Rodionova and they lost in the first round to Kirilenko/Radwańska. Cîrstea received a bye in the first round at Indian Wells, but lost in the second to Elena Vesnina. In the doubles tournament, she partnered Galina Voskoboeva and lost in the first round to Mattek-Sands/Washington. Cîrstea finished hardcourt season with a loss in the first round of the Miami Open to the qualifier Mariya Koryttseva. Her doubles effort in Miami with Caroline Wozniacki also ended in the first round, with a loss to Kuznetsova/Mauresmo.

Her clay-court season began at the inaugural Andalucia Tennis Experience in Marbella. She reached the semifinals, defeating Ioana Olaru, Andreja Klepač and Kaia Kanepi before losing to Carla Suárez Navarro. In the doubles, she partnered Ioana Olaru and they reached the quarterfinals, before losing to Hercog/Ulirova. At the Barcelona Ladies Open, Cîrstea lost in the first round of the singles tournament to Anastasiya Yakimova, but reached the finals of the doubles tournament with Andreja Klepač. They defeated Grönefeld/Senoglu, Ani/Voráčová, and Hlaváčková/Hradecká, before falling to Vives/Sanchez in the final. A week later, at Fes in Morocco, Cîrstea again lost in the first round of the singles tournament, to Lourdes Domínguez Lino, and again reached the finals of the doubles tournament, with Maria Kirilenko. Cîrstea/Kirilenko defeated Fernandez-Brugues/Thorpe, Czink/Keothavong, and Hercog/Olaru, before losing to Kleybanova/Makarova in three sets.

At the Estoril Open, Cîrstea reached the quarterfinals of the singles tournament, defeating Kimiko Date-Krumm and Maret Ani, before falling to the eventual champion Yanina Wickmayer. In the doubles, she again partnered Kirilenko, defeating Ivanova/Yakimova, before losing to Coin/Pelletier in the quarterfinals. At Madrid, she lost in the first rounds of both the singles and the doubles tournaments, falling to Alona Bondarenko in two sets in the singles, and partnering Vladimíra Uhlířová in the doubles to lose to Makarova/Kudrayvtseva in the super-tiebreaker.

Cîrstea then had her breakthrough tournament at the French Open. She began with wins over Carly Gullickson and an upset of the 21st seed Alizé Cornet to advance to the third round of a Grand Slam tournament for the first time. She then defeated her doubles partner Wozniacki, the tenth seed. Cîrstea continued her unlikely run with a three set upset over the fifth-seeded Jelena Janković to reach her first major quarterfinal, where she faced the 30th seed Sam Stosur, losing in straight sets. Her doubles effort with Wozniacki ended in the first round with a loss to Pennetta/Kirilenko.

At the Rosmalen Open in the Netherlands, she defeated Niculescu in three sets but lost in the second round to Yanina Wickmayer. She paired with Dinara Safina for the doubles tournament, defeating Grönefeld/Niculescu in the first round and losing to Errani/Pennetta in the second round. At Wimbledon, Cîrstea was seeded 28th. She defeated Edina Gallovits and Sania Mirza in the first two rounds, but lost to the eighth seed Victoria Azarenka in the third round. In the doubles, she once again partnered Wozniacki, but lost in the second round to Koryttseva/Poutchek. At the Swedish Open in Båstad, Cîrstea defeated the qualifier Johanna Larsson, before losing to Gisela Dulko in the second round. She and Wozniacki lost in the second round to Kondratieva/Lefevre. Two weeks later, Cîrstea lost in the first round of the Stanford Classic to Agnieszka Radwańska. Partnering Maria Kirilenko, she reached the semifinals of the doubles, defeating Granville/Gullickson and Coin/Pelletier, before losing to Chan/Niculescu.

Cîrstea had another improbable run at the LA Tennis Championships in August. She upset Wozniacki and Radwańska, despite Radwańska serving for the match in the third set, but lost to Stosur in the semifinals. Cîrstea/Wozniacki lost in the first round of the doubles to Chang/Yan. At the Cincinnati Open, she defeated Meghann Shaughnessy and Anna-Lena Grönefeld, before losing to the fourth seed Elena Dementieva, but achieved a career high ranking of No. 23. At the US Open, Cîrstea was seeded 24th. She defeated Ayumi Morita and Stéphanie Dubois before losing in the third round to the eventual finalist Wozniacki, the No. 9 seed and her doubles partner. Cîrstea/Wozniacki defeated Bammer/Schruff and Azarenka/Zvonareva before losing in the third round to the eventual champions, Williams/Williams. After the US Open, Cîrstea lost her next five matches, in the Korea Open, Pan Pacific Open, China Open, Linz Open and Kremlin Cup.

She finished 2009 ranked No. 43 in the world, with a 21–24 match record.

=== 2010: Struggles with form ===
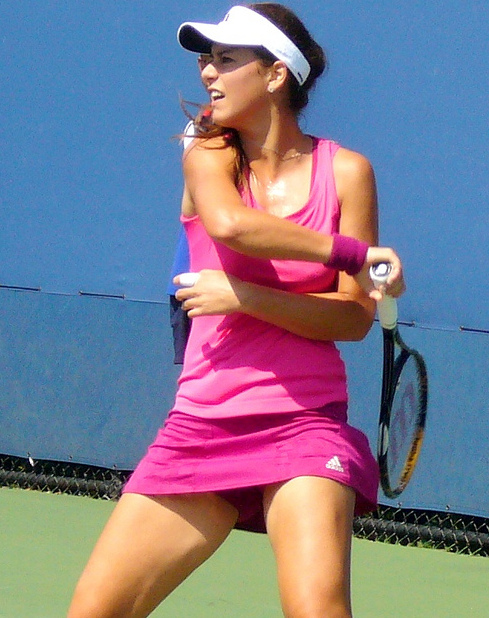
Cîrstea at the 2010 US Open

In the 2010 Hopman Cup in early January, Cîrstea played with Victor Hănescu. Romania were seeded sixth and finished last in their group, winning against the Australian team of Sam Stosur and Lleyton Hewitt, but losing to the Spains María José Martínez Sánchez and Tommy Robredo, the eventual champions, and the American team of Melanie Oudin and John Isner. Cîrstea posted a three-set win over Stosur and, with Hanescu, a two set win over Stosur and Hewitt. She lost in straight sets to Martínez Sánchez and Oudin.

She easily lost in the first round of the Hobart International to Peng Shuai. At the Australian Open, she defeated Olivia Rogowska, and lost in the second round to Alisa Kleybanova. She partnered with Anastasia Pavlyuchenkova in the doubles tournament, losing to Kirilenko/Radwańska in the first round.

Her next tournament was the Open GdF Suez in Paris, where she fell to Oudin. She lost in straight sets in the first rounds of the Dubai, Acapulco, and Monterrey tournaments, to Francesca Schiavone, Sharon Fichman, and Sara Errani, respectively. In Indian Wells, she reached the second round, first defeating Kaia Kanepi, before losing to Zheng Jie. Two weeks later at the Miami Open, Cîrstea defeated Michelle Larcher de Brito before losing in the second round to the third seed Venus Williams.

In the clay-court season, Cîrstea prevailed over the sixth seed Maria Kirilenko in the first round of the Andalucia Tennis Experience. She then lost in the second round to her fellow Romanian Simona Halep. At the Barcelona Open, she defeated Tamira Paszek, but lost in the second round to Iveta Benešová, in straight sets. Cîrstea was seeded second at the Estoril Open and defeated her compatriot Ioana Olaru in the first round and Larcher de Brito in the second. In the quarterfinals, she beat Arantxa Rus but fell to Arantxa Parra Santonja in the semifinals. In the doubles, she partnered Anabel Medina Garrigues to win the tournament, beating Peng/Zhang, Manasieva/Olaru and Diatchenko/Vedy. Cîrstea lost to Flavia Pennetta in three sets in the first round of the Madrid Open. Two weeks later, she qualified in Strasbourg, losing to Elena Baltacha in the first round.

At the French Open, she lost in the first round to the defending champion Svetlana Kuznetsova. At Eastbourne, she defeated Francesca Schiavone, losing in the second round to Kuznetsova in three sets. At Wimbledon, she was defeated by Petra Kvitová in the first round. At the Budapest Grand Prix, she lost in the first round to the qualifier Zuzana Ondrášková. She lost in the quarterfinals at the İstanbul Cup to Pavlyuchenkova and the Danish Open to Klára Zakopalová. In Cincinnati, she lost in the first round to Sybille Bammer. At the US Open, Cîrstea lost to Sofia Arvidsson. She ended the year as world No. 93 in the WTA rankings.

=== 2011: Doubles title, singles top 60 ===
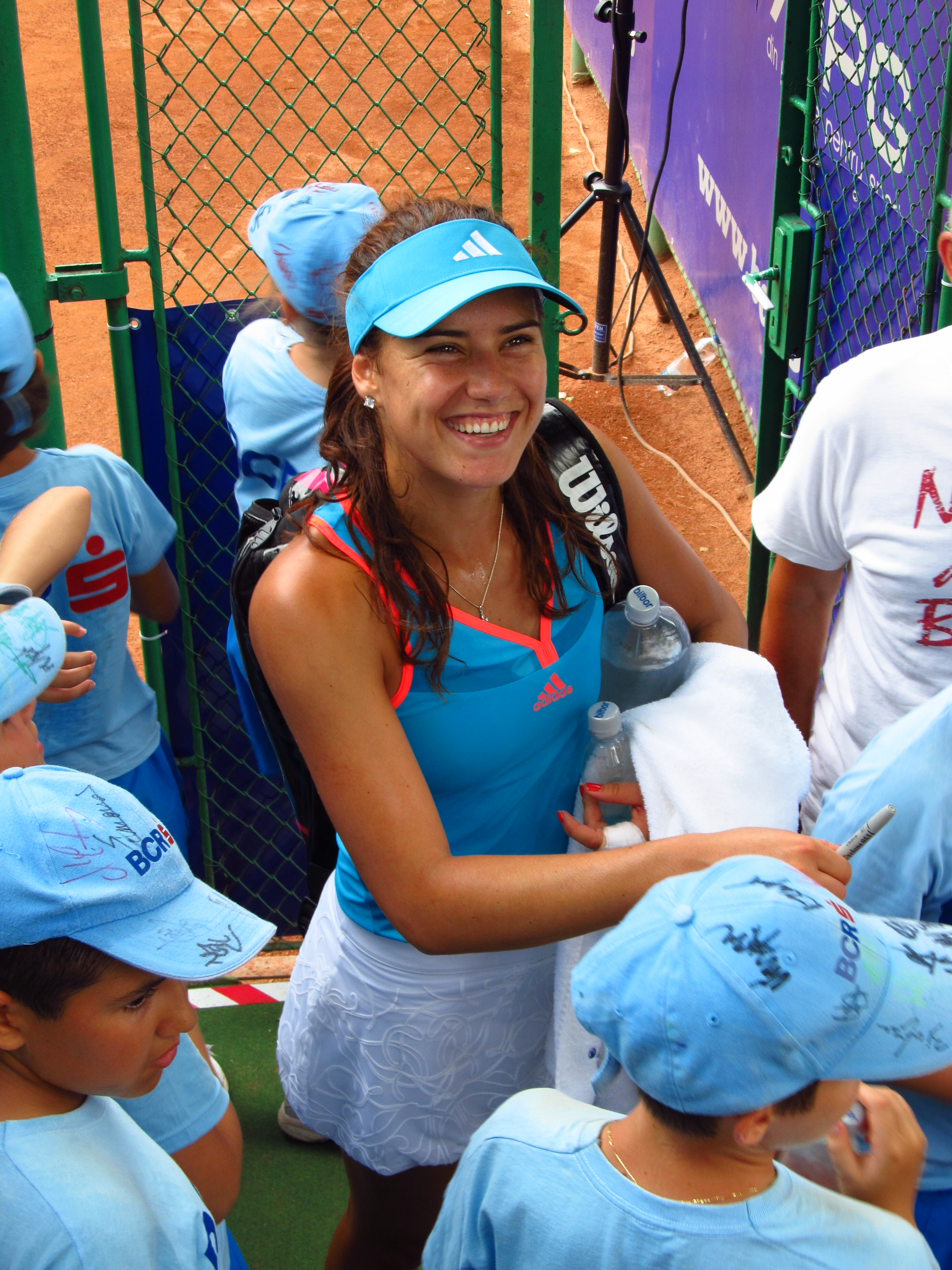
Cîrstea at the Romanian Open

At the Australian Open, Cîrstea defeated Mirjana Lučić before she was beaten by Shahar Pe'er in the second round. In the doubles tournament, she played with Lucie Šafářová and defeated the team of Sarah Borwell and Marie-Ève Pelletier, in three sets. In the second round they lost to Cara Black and Anastasia Rodionova.

In the U.S. National Indoor Championships, Cîrstea defeated Catherine Harrison in the first round, before losing to Shahar Pe'er in the second. In doubles, she and her partner Anastasia Pivovarova lost in the first round to Andrea Hlaváčková/Lucie Hradecká. At the Mexican Open, Cîrstea defeated Patricia Mayr-Achleitner but then lost to Laura Pous Tió. She played doubles again, now with Andreja Klepač as a partner. They won the first round by defeating Eleni Daniilidou/Jasmin Wöhr. They lost in the second round to Irina-Camelia Begu/Alexandra Panova. Cîrstea qualified in singles in Indian Wells. In the first round she lost to Alla Kudryavtseva. From the Miami Open, Sorana received a wildcard in singles, but lost in the first round to Zheng Jie.

At the Andalucia Tennis Experience, she lost in the first round to Sara Errani. She paired with Maria Elena Camerin for the doubles tournament defeating Alberta Brianti/Aurélie Védy. They lost in the second round to Errani/Vinci. In the following months, Sorana didn't have good results until she won Open de Cagnes-sur-Mer, a $100k tournament with a lot of top-100 players. She beat Patty Schnyder in the first round and compatriot Alexandra Dulgheru in the second of the French Open before losing to Li Na, in straight sets.

She then made it into the main draw at Wimbledon, where she lost in straight sets to Pauline Parmentier. Cîrstea played doubles again with Ayumi Morita of Japan defeating Chuang Chia-jung/Hsieh Su-wei. They won their second round against Sophie Lefèvre/Evgeniya Rodina. They lost in third round to Sabine Lisicki/Sam Stosur.

In Båstad at the 2011 Swedish Open, Cîrstea defeated Mirjana Lučić in the first round but lost in the second to Vesna Dolonc. At the Palermo Ladies Open, Sorana won her first round match against Andrea Hlaváčková. She lost then to Tsvetana Pironkova. At the ITF Bucharest, Cîrstea beat her compatriots Diana Enache and Mădălina Gojnea, before losing in the third round to Laura Pous Tió. She then played at the Carlsbad Open in California where she was beaten by CoCo Vandeweghe in a close match in the first round. Next tournament in Cincinnati, she qualified in singles for the main draw. In the first round she defeated Ksenia Pervak, but lost in the second to Jill Craybas in the third set tiebreaker.

In Dallas, at the inaugural edition of the Texas Tennis Open, Cîrstea beat Jarmila Gajdošová in the first round, in the second she lost to Aravane Rezaï. She played doubles for the first time with Alberta Brianti of Italy. In the first round they defeated Kateryna & Alona Bondarenko and in the second Andreja Klepač/Tatiana Poutchek. In the semifinal match, they beat Sofia Arvidsson/Casey Dellacqua in straight sets. They won their final match and the title by defeating Alizé Cornet/Pauline Parmentier. Cîrstea won her fourth career doubles title, while Brianti won her second. At the US Open, Cîrstea lost in the first round to Yanina Wickmayer. She paired with Ayumi Morita of Japan in doubles. They defeated Casey Dellacqua and Rennae Stubbs in the first round, but lost in the second to María José Martínez Sánchez and Anabel Medina Garrigues.

In Uzkebistan, she defeated Bojana Jovanovski and Aleksandra Krunić, but lost in the third round to Alla Kudryavtseva. Cîrstea played doubles too with Pauline Parmentier, but they lost in the first round to Iryna Brémond/Mandy Minella. Cîrstea won the title in the 2011 Open GDF Suez de Bretagne in Saint-Malo, France. She defeated Estrella Cabeza Candela, Eva Fernández Brugués, Laura Pous Tió and Stefanie Vögele, before beating Silvia Soler Espinosa in straight sets. At the Ladies Linz, Cîrstea played in the qualifying draw with great victories over Nikola Hofmanova and Silvia Soler Espinosa, before defeating Anastasia Rodionova 6–1, 6–2. In the main-draw rounds, she beat Tamira Paszek and Anastasia Pavlyuchenkova, the fourth seed of the tournament, before losing to Lucie Šafářová. In France, Cîrstea won a $50k tournament featuring top 100-players where she defeated Paula Ormaechea, Stefanie Vögele, Michaëlla Krajicek, Akgul Amanmuradova, and Sofia Arvidsson. At the end of the year, she returned to the top 60 in the singles rankings.

=== 2012: Ascent to top 30 ===
Cîrstea began 2012 ranked 60 in the world. Her first tournament at Auckland, she lost in the first round to Flavia Pennetta. In doubles, she partnered with Darija Jurak of Croatia; they lost their first-round match to Kristina Barrois/Anna-Lena Grönefeld. At Hobart, Cîrstea defeated Ksenia Pervak in the first and Bethanie Mattek-Sands in the second. In third round, Cîrstea lost to Angelique Kerber despite having two match points. In doubles, she paired again with Darija Jurak. They beat Kristina Barrois/Jasmin Wöhr in straight sets. Cîrstea/Jurak lost in second round to Irina-Camelia Begu/Monica Niculescu. At the Australian Open, Cîrstea eliminated sixth seed Sam Stosur. In the second round, she beat Urszula Radwańska before she lost to Sara Errani in a match tainted by an early back injury. In doubles, Sorana played with Lucie Šafářová again, but they lost to ninth seeds Grandin/Uhlířová.

At the Pattaya Open, Cîrstea was seeded seventh. She defeated Erika Sema in the first round and then Misaki Doi in the second by the same scoreline. In the quarterfinals, she defeated top seeded and world No. 8, Vera Zvonareva, who was forced to retire with a hip injury in the third set. She lost in the semifinals to Maria Kirilenko. In Doha, Cîrstea beat Jarmila Gajdošová in the first round. In the second round, she lost to third seed Samantha Stosur. Sorana paired with Anne Keothavong in doubles, but they lost in the first round to Anabel Medina Garrigues and Anastasia Pavlyuchenkova. At the Abierto de Monterrey, Cîrstea was the third seed in the tournament and received a wildcard in singles. In the first round, she beat Stefanie Vögele in three sets. Sorana lost in the second round to eventual champion Tímea Babos. Cîrstea was the 48th seed at the Indian Wells Open. She defeated Iveta Benešová in the first round, losing in the second to Agnieszka Radwańska. In Miami, she lost her first-round match to wildcard Heather Watson, in three sets.

At the Barcelona Ladies Open, her first tournament on clay, Sorana was the 47th seed. In the first round, she beat Polona Hercog after she retired due to dizziness. Sorana defeated Domínguez Lino in the second round. In the quarterfinals, Cîrstea beat Olga Govortsova but lost her first semifinal of the tournament to Dominika Cibulková. In Stuttgart at the Porsche Tennis Grand Prix, Cîrstea lost in the first round to Anna Chakvetadze. At the Portugal Open, she lost in the first round to Silvia Soler Espinosa. At the Madrid Open, Sorana upset seventh seed Marion Bartoli in the first round before she lost to Anabel Medina Garrigues. At the Internazionali d'Italia, Cîrstea defeated Jelena Janković in the first round and Sofia Arvidsson in the second before losing in three sets to Petra Kvitová. At Roland Garros, Sorana lost in the first round to Li Na. In doubles, she partnered with Ayumi Morita and they lost in first round to Pennetta/Schiavone due to Morita's retirement.

Cîrstea began her grass-court season at the Birmingham Classic. As the No. 10 seed, she lost in the first round to qualifier Melanie Oudin. In doubles, she partnered with Anne Keothavong and they lost in first round to Zhang Shuai/Zheng Jie. At the Eastbourne International, Cîrstea lost in the first round to defending champion No. 4 seed, Marion Bartoli. At Wimbledon, she defeated Pauline Parmentier in the first round, and beat 11th seed Li Na in the second but lost to Maria Kirilenko. In doubles, Cîrstea and Morita lost in the first round to Casey Dellacqua/Sam Stosur. She competed in the women's singles and doubles (with Simona Halep) at the 2012 Summer Olympics, but was eliminated in round one in both events.

At the Bank of the West Classic in San Jose, Sorana as the ninth seed beat Vania King and lucky loser Zheng Saisai. In the third round, she defeated third seed Dominika Cibulková, in three sets, but lost in the semifinals to Serena Williams. At the US Open, Cîrstea defeated 16th seed Sabine Lisicki, and in the second round, she lost to Anna Tatishvili in three sets. In Guangzhou, Cîrstea advanced to the semifinals, before losing to Laura Robson.

=== 2013: First Premier 5 final, top 25 ===
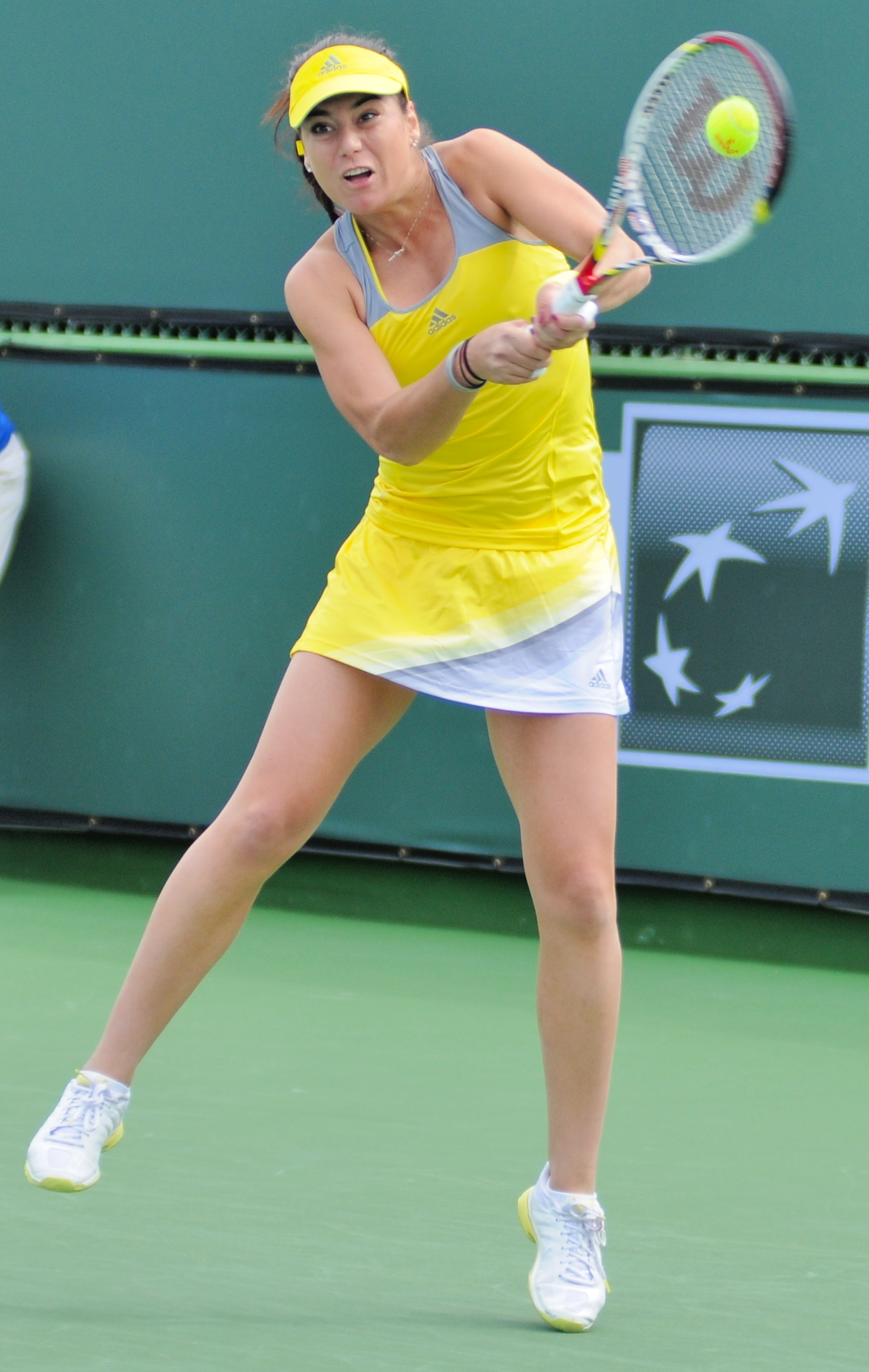
Cîrstea at the 2013 Indian Wells Open

Sorana began the year at the Auckland Open where she lost her opener to Heather Watson. The following week, she defeated Nina Bratchikova before losing to Lauren Davis in the second round at Hobart. Cîrstea reached the third round of the Australian Open losing to Li Na. She then followed it up with a semifinal showing at the Pattaya Open losing to eventual champion Maria Kirilenko. She then reached the third round at Indian Wells where she lost to Agnieszka Radwańska. At the Miami Open, Cîrstea made the fourth round by defeating Angelique Kerber in straight sets. She fell to Jelena Janković in the next round. At the French Open, she reached the third round losing to world No. 1 and eventual champion, Serena Williams. She then reached the quarterfinals of the Birmingham Classic falling to Donna Vekić. Cîrstea lost to Camila Giorgi in the second round at Wimbledon.

She began the US Open Series with a semifinal at the Stanford Classic losing to Dominika Cibulková and a quarterfinal at the Washington Open losing to Alizé Cornet. In the Rogers Cup en route to reaching her first final in five years, Cîrstea beat two former number-one players, Caroline Wozniacki and Jelena Janković, and former Grand Slam champions Petra Kvitová and Li Na. She lost to top-seeded Serena Williams in the final in two sets. She then withdrew from the Western & Southern Open citing a back injury, and later retired from her first round match at the New Haven Open while trailing against Pavlyuchenkova. She had reached now the 21st place in the WTA rankings.

At the US Open, she defeated qualifier Sharon Fichman, before then being upset by qualifier Kurumi Nara in the second round. Her next tournament was the Guangzhou International Open where she suffered another early-round loss, this time to Bojana Jovanovski. She advanced to the second round of the Pan Pacific Open, after beating Julia Görges. She then defeated Misaki Doi, before losing to Svetlana Kuznetsova in the third round. She then lost her opening matches at Beijing and Linz to Bojana Jovanovski and Patricia Mayr-Achleitner.

By the end of the year, she had lost her No. 1 Romanian position to rising star Simona Halep.

=== 2014: Injuries and Fed Cup success ===
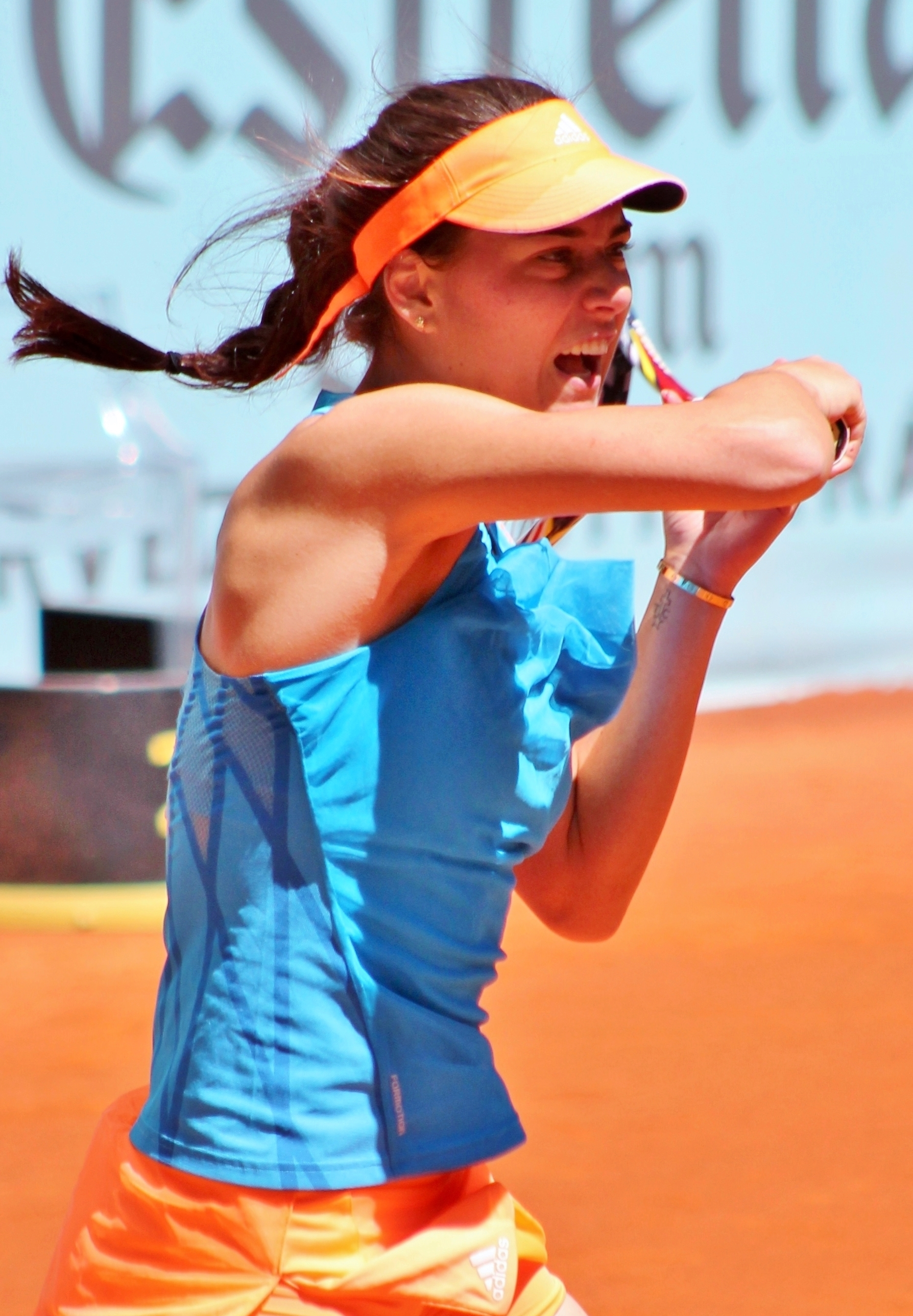
Cîrstea at the 2014 Madrid Open

Cîrstea began her 2014 season at the Auckland Open. Seeded fourth, she lost in the first round to qualifier Sharon Fichman. In Sydney, she was defeated in the first round by qualifier and eventual champion, Tsvetana Pironkova. Seeded 21st at the Australian Open, she fell in the first round to Marina Erakovic.

Seeded third at the Pattaya Open, Cîrstea got her first win of the season by beating Anna Karolína Schmiedlová in the first round. She ended up losing in the quarterfinals to eventual finalist Karolína Plíšková, despite having match points in the second set. At the Qatar Ladies Open, she was eliminated from the tournament in the second round by second seed Agnieszka Radwańska. The following week at the Dubai Championships, she defeated fourth seed, Sara Errani, in the second round. She was beaten in the quarterfinals by eighth seed and 2011 champion Wozniacki. Seeded 25th at Indian Wells, she lost in the second round to qualifier Camila Giorgi. Seeded 25th in Miami, she was defeated in the second round by Pironkova.

Cîrstea began her clay-court season at the Family Circle Cup in Charleston. Seeded eighth, she was ousted from the tournament in the second round by Teliana Pereira. At the Porsche Grand Prix in Stuttgart, she lost in the first round to German wildcard and 2011 champion, Julia Görges. Despite the poor form in WTA tournaments, in April, Cîrstea made a big contribution in 2014 Fed Cup World Group II Play-offs, helping Romania promote to World Group II after defeating Serbia 4–1, with Cîrstea winning both her ties against Ana Ivanovic and Bojana Jovanovski.

At the Stuttgart Open, she lost in the first round to German wildcard entrant Julia Görges. She took fifth seed Petra Kvitová to three sets in their opener at the Madrid Open. Then, Cîrstea succumbed to American qualifier Christina McHale in the first round at the Internazionali d'Italia. Cîrstea managed to end her losing streak at the French Open where she was the 26th seed. In the first round, she beat qualifier Aleksandra Wozniak and then Teliana Pereira. Cîrstea lost in the third round to sixth seed Jelena Janković.

At Wimbledon where Cîrstea was the 29th seed, she lost in the first round to young American qualifier Victoria Duval. As the top seed at the Baku Cup, she defeated Tunisian wildcard Ons Jabeur in the first round but then lost to eventual semifinalist Stefanie Vögele, in straight sets. Cîrstea was the eighth seed at the Washington Open and defeated Kiki Bertens in the first round but then lost to Bojana Jovanovski. At the Rogers Cup, she fell to 15th seed Lucie Šafářová in the first round failing to defend her finalist points from the year before. At the Cincinnati Open, she lost in the first round to ninth seed and eventual finalist Ivanovic. After Cincinnati, Cîrstea got a wildcard for qualifying at the Connecticut Open. In the first round of qualifying, Cîrstea beat Alison Van Uytvanck. In the second round of qualifying, she lost to seventh seed Kaia Kanepi, in three sets.

At the US Open, Cîrstea easily beat Heather Watson in the first round. In the second round, Cîrstea lost to seventh seed Eugenie Bouchard. At the Guangzhou International Open, she lost in the first round to qualifier Petra Martić. At the Wuhan Open, Cîrstea lost in the first round of qualifying to top seed Zarina Diyas. Cîrstea's final tournament of the year was the China Open where she fell in the first round of qualifying to ninth seed Ajla Tomljanović.

At the end of the year, Cîrstea claimed that she had persistent small injuries particularly afflicting her shoulder.

Cîrstea ended 2014 ranked 93 in her seventh straight top-100 season.

=== 2015: Loss of form ===
Cîrstea was scheduled to start her season off at the Shenzhen Open, but she withdrew due to a shoulder injury. Her first tournament of the year was the Australian Open where she lost in the first round to qualifier Alexandra Panova. As a result, Cîrstea fell out of the top 100 for the first time since 2008.

In February, Cîrstea competed at the Midland Tennis Classic, a $100k event in Michigan. As the second seed, she was defeated in the first round by Jessica Pegula. Cîrstea played at the Miami Open with a wildcard for the main draw, beaten in the first round by Christina McHale. She stayed in Florida to play at the USTA Pro Circuit Event in Osprey where she lost in the first round to Danka Kovinić, in straight sets.

Cîrstea competed next at the Copa Colsanitas where she suffered another first-round loss, this time at the hands of eighth seed Irina Falconi. However, partnering with Yaroslava Shvedova in doubles, she won her first match of the year by beating Mandy Minella/Olga Savchuk in the first round. Then they lost to the eventual champions Paula Cristina Gonçalves/Beatriz Haddad Maia in the quarterfinals. In May, Cîrstea traveled to France to compete at the Open Saint-Gaudens, a $60k event where she lost in the first round in three sets to Wang Yafan. With the French Open starting on Sunday, May 24th, Cîrstea traveled to Paris in order to qualify for the main draw. She won both of her qualifying matches but suffered a straight-sets loss in the final round of qualifying to Verónica Cepede Royg. Due to not qualifying for the French Open, Cîrstea broke her streak of main-draw appearances dating back to the 2008 Australian Open.

Cîrstea went to Italy to play at the Internazionali di Brescia, a $50k event. Even though she was the fourth seed, she was defeated in the first round by Italian qualifier Claudia Giovine. After the tournament in Brescia, Cîrstea stayed in Italy to compete at a $25k event in Padua. She easily won her first-round match over Giorgia Marchetti but then lost to qualifier Petra Uberalová. Next, Cîrstea went back to France to play the Open de Montpellier, a $50k+H event. Here, she lost in the first round to fourth seed Richèl Hogenkamp.

Trying to qualify for the main draw, Cîrstea played qualifying for the Wimbledon Championships. She won her first round over Naomi Osaka but then lost in the next round to fourth seed Sachia Vickery.

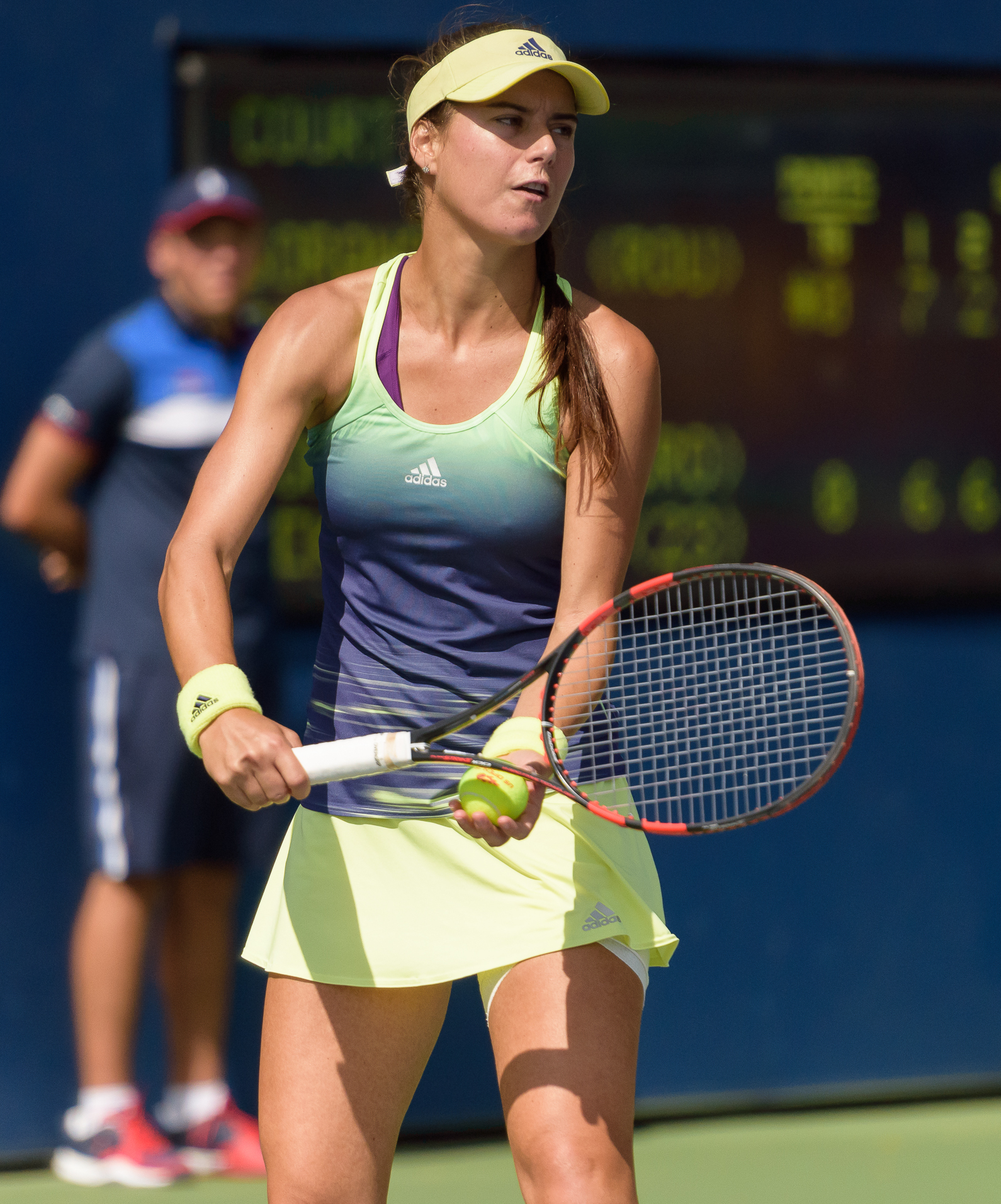
Cîrstea at the 2015 US Open Qualifying

Due to no success at Wimbledon, Cîrstea competed at the Lorraine Open 88, a $100k event in Contrexéville, France. She reached the quarterfinals beating fourth seed and compatriot Andreea Mitu and Donna Vekić. She was defeated in the quarterfinals by eighth seed and eventual finalist, Yulia Putintseva. Next, she traveled to her country to play at the Bucharest Open; she also was given a wildcard into the main draw. Cîrstea started the tournament with a straight-sets victory over Sesil Karatantcheva. In the second round, she lost to compatriot Andreea Mitu in three sets. At the Poznański Open, a $75k event in Sobota, Poland, Cîrstea suffered a straight-set loss in the second round to third seed Richèl Hogenkamp. The week of 10 August saw Cîrstea compete at the first edition of the Advantage Cars Prague Open, a $75k event. She beat Czech Tereza Martincová in the first round. In the second round, she lost a tough three-set match to wildcard Petra Cetkovská. Cîrstea failed to qualify for the US Open; she lost in the final round of qualifying to Mayo Hibi.

Cîrstea also fell in the first round of qualifying at the Japan Women's Open to third seed María Teresa Torró Flor. Her final tournament of the year was at the Ankara Cup, a $50k event in Turkey where she lost in the first round to fifth seed İpek Soylu.

Cîrstea ended the year ranked 244.

=== 2016: Madrid quarterfinals, top 100 ===
Cîrstea began the year as world No. 244. In January, she played at $25k tournaments in Guaruja and Bertioga, both Brazil. In Guaruja, she beat Oleksandra Korashvili, Rebecca Šramková, Jil Teichmann, and third seed Haddad Maia, before losing to Montserrat Gonzalez in three sets in the final. At Bertioga, she beat Sandra Zaniewska, Victoria Bosio, Jil Teichmann and Rebecca Šramková before beating Catalina Pella in the final. It was the first tournament win after a period of almost four years.

In February, Cîrstea returned to the WTA Tour by playing at the Rio Open. As a wildcard, she reached the semifinals with straight victories against Brazilian wildcard entrant Haddad Maia, fifth seed Polona Hercog, and third seed Danka Kovinić. Cîrstea lost in the semifinals to Shelby Rogers. Her performance moved her ranking from 199 to 153. Also in February, she played at a $25k tournament in São Paulo. She defeated Yvonne Cavallé Reimers, Martina Caregaro, and Jil Teichmann en route to the semifinals where she lost to Sara Sorribes Tormo.

In March, Cîrstea traveled to Miami to compete at the Miami Open. Receiving a wildcard for qualifying, she lost in the final round to 17th seed Francesca Schiavone. Also in March, Sorana played at the Engie Open, a $50k event in Croissy-Beaubourg, France. She defeated Elitsa Kostova, Josephine Boualem, and Andreea Mitu en route to the semifinals, where she lost to second seed Pauline Parmentier.

Cîrstea kicked off her clay-court season at the İstanbul Cup. Seeded fifth for qualifying, she made it to the main draw beating Turkish wildcards Pemra Özgen and Başak Eraydın. In the main draw, she upset third seed and defending champion Lesia Tsurenko in the first round. In the second round, she lost to eventual champion Çağla Büyükakçay. Cîrstea successfully qualified for the Prague Open defeating Karolína Beránková, Anastasiya Komardina, and Amandine Hesse. She lost in the first round in three sets to the fourth seed and eventual finalist Sam Stosur.

Receiving a wildcard for the Madrid Open, Cîrstea reached the quarterfinals beating Jelena Jankovic, Danka Kovinić and Laura Siegemund en route. In the quarterfinals, she faced Dominika Cibulková and lost in three sets. Cîrstea qualified for the French Open defeating Zhang Yuxuan, Jana Čepelová, and Elise Mertens. She lost in the first round to 18th seed Elina Svitolina.

Cîrstea started her grass-court season at the first edition of the Mallorca Open. Seeded second for qualifying, she won all of her matches to advance to the main draw beating Valentyna Ivakhnenko, Sesil Karatantcheva, and Mandy Minella. She advanced to the quarterfinals defeating fifth seed Yulia Putintseva and wild card Daniela Hantuchová. She lost in the quarterfinals to second seed Jelena Janković. Cîrstea played in her final tournament before Wimbledon at the Eastbourne International. She retired during her first round of qualifying match over seventh seed Varvara Lepchenko. At the Wimbledon Championships, Cîrstea was defeated in the first round by tenth seed and two-time Wimbledon champion Petra Kvitová.

After Wimbledon, Cîrstea played at the Reinert Open, a $50k event in Versmold, Germany. As the second seed, she made it to the semifinals beating qualifier Andrea Gámiz, Nadia Podoroska, and eighth seed Lesley Kerkhove. She lost her semifinal match to Antonia Lottner. Competing at the Swedish Open, Cîrstea lost in the first round to fourth seed Annika Beck.

Cîrstea played only two tournaments during the US Open Series. At the Western & Southern Open in Cincinnati, she lost in the final round of qualifying to seventh seed Alizé Cornet. At the Connecticut Open, she lost in the second round of qualifying to Louisa Chirico. Playing at the US Open, she lost in the first round to compatriot Ana Bogdan in three sets.

After the US Open, Cîrstea competed at the Open de Biarritz, a $100k event in France. As the second seed, she advanced to the semifinals where she lost to eighth seed Rebecca Šramková. During the last week of September, Cîrstea played at the Tashkent Open. As the seventh seed, she was defeated in the first round by Francesca Schiavone. Playing at the Generali Ladies Linz in Austria, Cîrstea upset sixth seed Kiki Bertens in the first round. She lost in the second round to French qualifier Océane Dodin. Her last WTA Tour event of the year was at the Luxembourg Open where she lost in the first round to qualifier Tereza Smitková.

Cîrstea's final two tournaments of the season were on the ITF Circuit. At the Internationaux de la Vienne in Poitiers, France, she lost in the first round to Anett Kontaveit. Playing her last tournament of 2016 at the Open de Limoges, she was defeated in the second round by Tamara Korpatsch. She ended the year ranked 81.

=== 2017: Australian Open fourth round ===
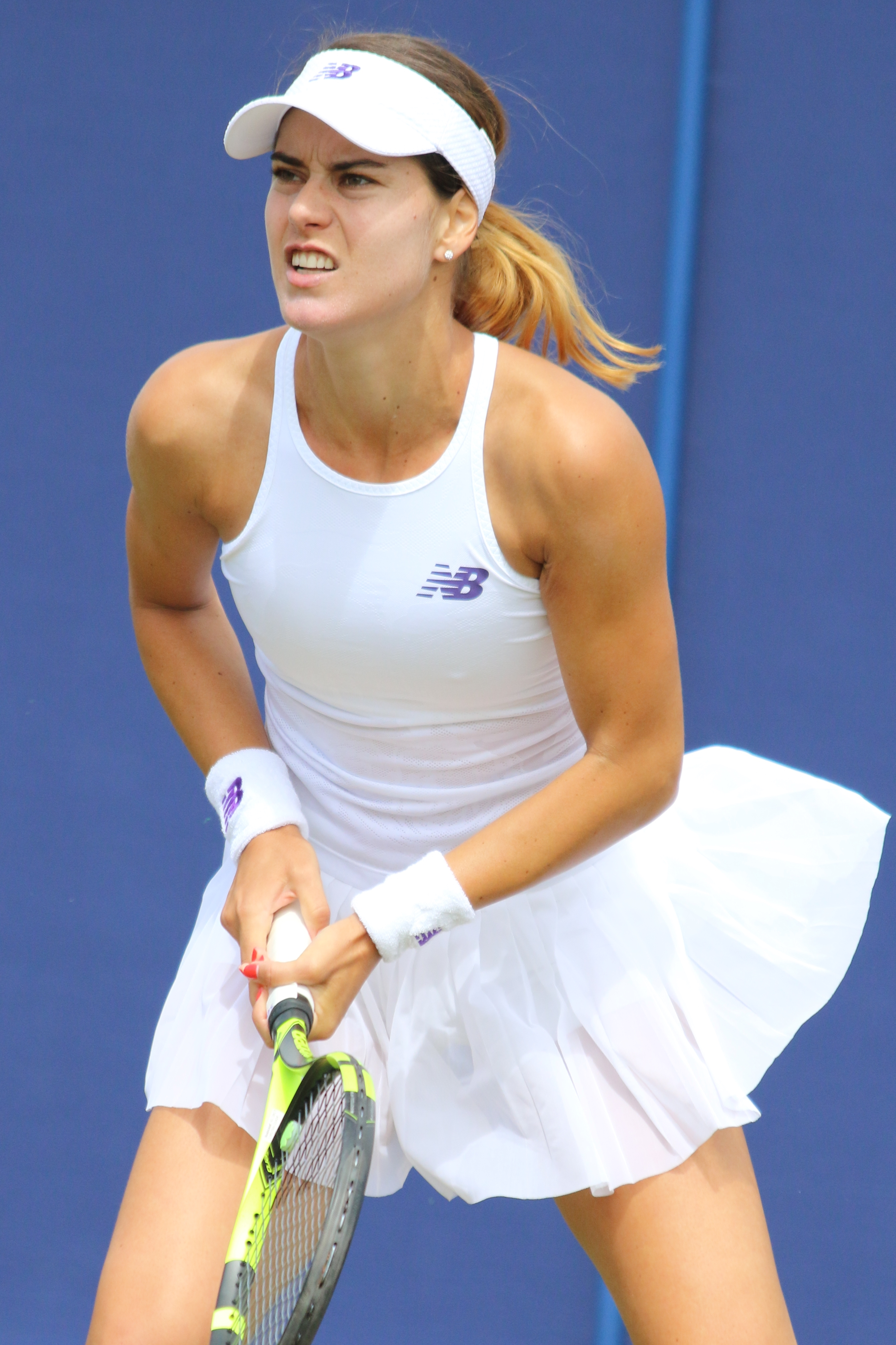
Cîrstea at the 2017 Eastbourne International

Cîrstea started her 2017 season at the Shenzhen Open. She defeated Kristína Kučová in the first round before losing to top seed and defending champion Agnieszka Radwańska in the second round. Cîrstea made it to the fourth round of the Australian Open for the first time in her career defeating Irina Khromacheva, tenth seed Carla Suárez Navarro, and Alison Riske in the first three rounds before losing to seventh seed Garbiñe Muguruza.

Her next tournament was the Taiwan Open. Cirstea retired midway through her first-round match against Risa Ozaki due to a left wrist injury. She returned from injury to be a part of the Romanian team at the Fed Cup World Group II against Belgium. She lost the second rubber against Yanina Wickmayer in a close three-setter which went on for 3 hours & 22 minutes. Even though Romania lost the tie against Belgium, she won her doubles match teaming up with Monica Niculescu.

After making first-round exits at the Hungarian Ladies Open and at Indian Wells, she won her first singles match in nearly two months against Monica Puig in the first round of the Miami Open. Cîrstea fell to Caroline Wozniacki in the third round. She made the quarterfinals of the Madrid Open where she lost to Kristina Mladenovic, and the semifinals of the Nuremberg Cup. At the French Open she lost to 21st seed Carla Suárez Navarro in the second round.

Her first tournament of the grass-court season was at Eastbourne, where she entered the main draw as a lucky loser following the withdrawal of CoCo Vandeweghe; she lost to Hsieh Su-wei in the final qualifying round. In the main draw, she defeated Kateřina Siniaková, before falling to the fifth seed Johanna Konta. Cîrstea reached the third round of Wimbledon, defeating 23rd seed Kiki Bertens in the first round, before bowing out to the eventual champion, Garbiñe Muguruza.

At Bucharest, she lost in the first round to compatriot Ana Bogdan, before entering the Rogers Cup in Toronto. Qualifying for the main draw, defeating Aleksandra Wozniak and Camila Giorgi, she was defeated in the first round by Caroline Garcia. She next lost in the first qualifying round of Cincinnati to Aleksandra Krunić, before entering the US Open. Defeating Lesley Pattinama Kerkhove in the first round, she fell to Jeļena Ostapenko in the second round.

At Seoul, Cîrstea defeated Misa Eguchi and Nicole Gibbs, before falling to Luksika Kumkhum. At Wuhan, she defeated Wang Yafan in the first round, before being defeated by Wang Qiang. At Beijing, she reached the quarterfinals, defeating Mona Barthel, Christina McHale, and Karolína Plíšková; the latter win was her first against a top ten opponent since 2014. She lost in the quarterfinal match against Ostapenko.

At Linz, she defeated Alison Van Uytvanck and Natalia Vikhlyantseva, before being defeated by Magdaléna Rybáriková. Her final tournament of the year was at Luxembourg, where she was defeated in the first round by Verónica Cepede Royg. She ended the year ranked No. 37.

=== 2018: Mixed results, rankings drop ===
Cîrstea's first tournament of the year was at Brisbane, where she defeated Jennifer Brady in the first round before losing to Anastasija Sevastova. At Hobart, she lost in the first round to Heather Watson, whilst at the Australian Open, she defeated Zarina Diyas in the first round, before falling to Lucie Šafářová.

She next entered St. Petersburg, where she lost in the first round to Dominika Cibulková; she next won her Fed Cup tie against Carol Zhao. She next competed in Doha, where she defeated Maria Sakkari and Elise Mertens, before falling to Garbiñe Muguruza. At Budapest, she lost in the first round to lucky loser Viktória Kužmová. At Indian Wells, she defeated compatriot Monica Niculescu in the first round, before falling to Venus Williams. In receipt of a first-round bye at Miami, she was defeated in the second round by Hsieh Su-wei.

At İstanbul, she lost in the first round to Yulia Putintseva, whilst at Madrid, she defeated Kateřina Siniaková, before losing to Daria Kasatkina. At Rome, she lost in the first round to qualifier Danielle Collins. At Nuremberg, she defeated Andrea Petkovic and Madison Brengle, before retiring from her quarterfinal match against Alison Riske. At the French Open, she lost in the first round to Daria Gavrilova.

Cîrstea's first grass-court tournament of the year was at Mallorca, where she lost in the first round to Johanna Larsson. Entering Eastbourne, she lost in the first round to Anastasia Pavlyuchenkova, whilst, at Wimbledon, she defeated Magdaléna Rybáriková, before losing to Evgeniya Rodina. At her home tournament in Bucharest, she reached the quarterfinals by defeating Çağla Büyükakçay and Maryna Zanevska, before falling to first seed and eventual champion Anastasija Sevastova.

At the Rogers Cup in Montreal, in a mirror of her results in Indian Wells, she defeated Monica Niculescu in the first round, before losing to Venus Williams. At Cincinnati, she defeated Vania King, before falling to Ajla Tomljanović. At the US Open, she defeated Alison Riske, before falling to Maria Sharapova.

Cîrstea failed to qualify for Wuhan, losing to Nicole Gibbs in the first qualifying round, and also failed to qualify for Beijing, losing in the final qualifying round to Polona Hercog. Gaining entry as a lucky loser following the withdrawal of Ashleigh Barty, she lost in the first round to Kiki Bertens. At Linz, she was defeated in the first round by Jil Teichmann. Her final event of the year was at the $100k tournament in Dubai, where she defeated Yuliya Hatouka, before falling to the eventual champion Peng Shuai. Cîrstea ended the year ranked No. 86.

=== 2019: First US Open third round in 10 years ===
Cîrstea's first tournament of the year was at the Shenzhen Open. She reached the quarterfinals where she lost to two-time finalist and eventual finalist, Alison Riske. Ranked 84 at the Australian Open, she was defeated in the first round by Rebecca Peterson.

At Doha, she was defeated in the first qualifying round by doubles specialist Shuko Aoyama. At Budapest, she defeated Anna Bondár and Aleksandra Krunić, before falling to Anastasia Potapova. At the Indian Wells Challenger, she received a first-round bye, before falling to Kristie Ahn in the second round. At the Indian Wells Open itself, she defeated Danielle Lao in the first round, before falling to Nao Hibino. She lost in the first round of the Miami Open to Laura Siegemund.

At Lugano, Cîrstea defeated Mona Barthel in the first round, before losing to the eventual champion Polona Hercog. At İstanbul, she defeated compatriot Irina Bara, before losing to Barbora Strýcová. At Madrid, she defeated Madison Keys in the first round, before falling to Caroline Garcia. She had a strong run to the semifinals of Nuremberg, defeating Kirsten Flipkens, Laura Ioana Paar, and Nina Stojanović, before falling to the eventual champion Yulia Putintseva. At the French Open, she defeated Kaja Juvan, before losing to Aliona Bolsova.

Cîrstea's next match was at Wimbledon, where she lost in the first round to Amanda Anisimova. At Båstad, where she was the top seed, she lost in the first round to Johanna Larsson. At Bucharest, she lost in the first round to compatriot Jaqueline Cristian. In Jūrmala, she was defeated in the first round by Valentina Ivakhnenko. She did not play another match until the US Open, where she defeated Kateřina Siniaková and Aliona Bolsova, before falling to Taylor Townsend.

At Hiroshima, she lost in the first round to Sara Sorribes Tormo. This was followed by a run to the final at Tashkent, the tournament she had won 11 years prior. She defeated Denisa Allertová, Ysaline Bonaventure, Danka Kovinić, and Katarina Zavatska, before losing in the final to Alison Van Uytvanck in three sets. At Luxembourg, she defeated Pauline Parmentier in the first round, before losing to the defending champion, Julia Görges. Her final tournament of the year was the 125k at Limoges, defeating Tatjana Maria and Sara Sorribes Tormo to reach the quarterfinals, where she lost to Nicole Gibbs. Cîrstea ended the year ranked No. 72.

=== 2020: Consecutive US Open third round ===
Cîrstea started her 2020 season at the Shenzhen Open. She lost in the first round to Chinese wildcard Wang Xiyu. Despite qualifying for the Hobart International, she withdrew from the tournament due to a left leg injury. Ranked 74 at the Australian Open, she beat 32nd seed, Barbora Strýcová, in the first round. She lost in the second round to Coco Gauff.

Getting past qualifying at the Dubai Championships, Cîrstea fell in the first round to Anett Kontaveit. In Doha, she was beaten in the first round by Elena Rybakina. The WTA tour was suspended from March through July due to the COVID-19 pandemic.

When the WTA resumed tournament play in August, Cîrstea played at the Palermo Ladies Open where she lost in the first round to Sara Errani, in three sets. At the Western & Southern Open in New York rather than Cincinnati, she was defeated in the final round of qualifying by Anna Kalinskaya.

Ranked No. 77 at the US Open, Cîrstea upset ninth seed, Johanna Konta, in the second round. She was eliminated from the tournament in the third round by 20th seed Karolína Muchová. Cîrstea suffered a first-round loss at the French Open to 14th seed Rybakina.

In October, Cîrstea competed at the first edition of the Ostrava Open. She lost in the first round of qualifying to Paula Badosa. At the 2020 Upper Austria Linz, she was defeated in the second round by qualifier Océane Dodin. Cîrstea's final tournament of the year was at the Dubai Tennis Challenge. She won her first singles title since January 2016 by beating fifth seed, Kateřina Siniaková, in the final. Cîrstea ended the year ranked 86.

=== 2021: Istanbul title, first top 10 win in four years ===
When Cîrstea landed in Australia for the Australian Open and she had to enter a hard quarantine as she travelled on a flight on which a fellow passenger tested positive for COVID-19. After this, she participated in the warm-up tournament designed for those players affected by this hard quarantine, the Grampians Trophy. There, she beat second seed, Belinda Bencic, in the second round. She fell in the quarterfinals to Ann Li. In this match against Li, Cîrstea was involved in an unusual incident where she requested a code violation from the umpire for coaching, as she was irritated by her coaches' repeated comments towards her.

At the Australian Open, she scored her first top 10 victory since 2017 by defeating ninth seed, three-time Grand Slam winner, and 2019 finalist, Petra Kvitová, in the second round. She lost in the third round to 19th seed Markéta Vondroušová.

Seeded sixth at the Lyon Open, Cîrstea lost in the first round to Nina Stojanović. In Dubai, she was defeated in the second round by 15th seed Anett Kontaveit. At the Miami Open, she fell in the second round to 22nd seed Kontaveit.

Cîrstea's first clay-court tournament of the year was at the İstanbul Cup. She reached her first final since Tashkent in 2019, and her first on clay since Budapest in 2007. She defeated top seed, Elise Mertens, in straight sets to claim her first title since 2008; she did so without dropping a set throughout the entire tournament. Following this victory, her ranking rose to No. 58, her highest ranking since October 2018. Playing in Madrid as a wildcard entrant, she was beaten in the first round by Jessica Pegula. At the Internationaux de Strasbourg, she reached her second final of the season; she lost to fifth seed Barbora Krejčíková. Ranked 54 at the French Open, she made it to the fourth round where she was ousted from the tournament by eventual semifinalist Tamara Zidanšek.

Cîrstea began her grass-court season at the German Open in Berlin. She lost in the first round to sixth seed Garbiñe Muguruza. Seeded sixth at the first edition of the Bad Homburg Open, she was defeated in the first round by Andrea Petkovic. Ranked 45 at Wimbledon, she stunned 12th seed, two-time Grand Slam winner, and former world No. 1, Victoria Azarenka, in the second round in three sets. She was eliminated in the third round by British wildcard Emma Raducanu.

In August, Cîrstea competed at the Canadian Open in Montreal where she lost in the second round to eighth seed Azarenka. At the Western & Southern Open in Cincinnati, she was defeated in the first round by eventual finalist Jil Teichmann. Seeded third at the first edition of the Chicago Women's Open, she was eliminated in the first round by Tereza Martincová. Ranked 39 at the US Open, she beat 29th seed, Veronika Kudermetova, in the first round. She then lost in the second round to Shelby Rogers.

Seeded fourth at the Slovenia Open, Cîrstea reached the quarterfinals where she lost to eventual champion Jasmine Paolini. At the Ostrava Open, she was defeated in the first round by eventual champion Kontaveit. Seeded 32nd at Indian Wells, she lost in the third round to fourth seed Elina Svitolina. Cîrstea ended the year ranked 38.

=== 2022: Australian Open fourth round ===
Cîrstea started her 2022 season at the first edition of the Melbourne Summer Set 2. Seeded fifth, she lost in the second round to eventual champion Amanda Anisimova. Seeded ninth at the Adelaide International 2, she was defeated in the first round by Anhelina Kalinina. Ranked No. 38 at the Australian Open, she beat 20th seed, Petra Kvitová, for the second straight year in the first round. She then beat 10th seed Anastasia Pavlyuchenkova, in the third round to reach the fourth round for the second time in her career. She ended up losing to seventh seed Iga Świątek, in three sets.

Cîrstea lost in the second round of the St. Petersburg Trophy to second seed and eventual champion, Anett Kontaveit. In Doha, she was eliminated from the tournament in the second round by fifth seed and two-time finalist, Garbiñe Muguruza. Seeded second at the Lyon Open, she was ousted in the semifinals by Dayana Yastremska. Seeded No. 26 in Indian Wells, she reached the fourth round where she lost to 24th seed and 2015 champion, Simona Halep. Seeded 24th at the Miami Open, she was defeated in the second round by Zhang Shuai.

Cîrstea began her clay-court season at the İstanbul Cup. Seeded second and the defending champion, she made it to the semifinals where she fell to third seed Veronika Kudermetova. In Madrid, she was beaten in the first round by Nuria Párrizas Díaz. At the Italian Open, she lost in the first round to ninth seed and eventual finalist, Ons Jabeur. Seeded third and last year finalist at the Internationaux de Strasbourg, she was defeated in the first round by qualifier, Ekaterina Makarova, in three sets. Seeded 26th at the French Open, she lost in the second round to 2018 finalist Sloane Stephens.

Cîrstea started her grass-court season at the Birmingham Classic seeded sixth and reached the semifinals where she fell to eighth seed Zhang Shuai. In Eastbourne, she retired during her first-round match against Anhelina Kalinina due to illness. Seeded 26th at Wimbledon, she lost in the second round to eventual semifinalist, Tatjana Maria. Seeded fourth at the Prague Open, she fell in her first-round match to qualifier Oksana Selekhmeteva.

Cîrstea began her US Open preparation in Cincinnati where she beat 12th seed Belinda Bencic in the first round. She lost in the second to eventual finalist Petra Kvitová. After the US Open, she hired former player Thomas Johansson to be her coach.

=== 2023: Miami semifinal, win over world No. 2 ===
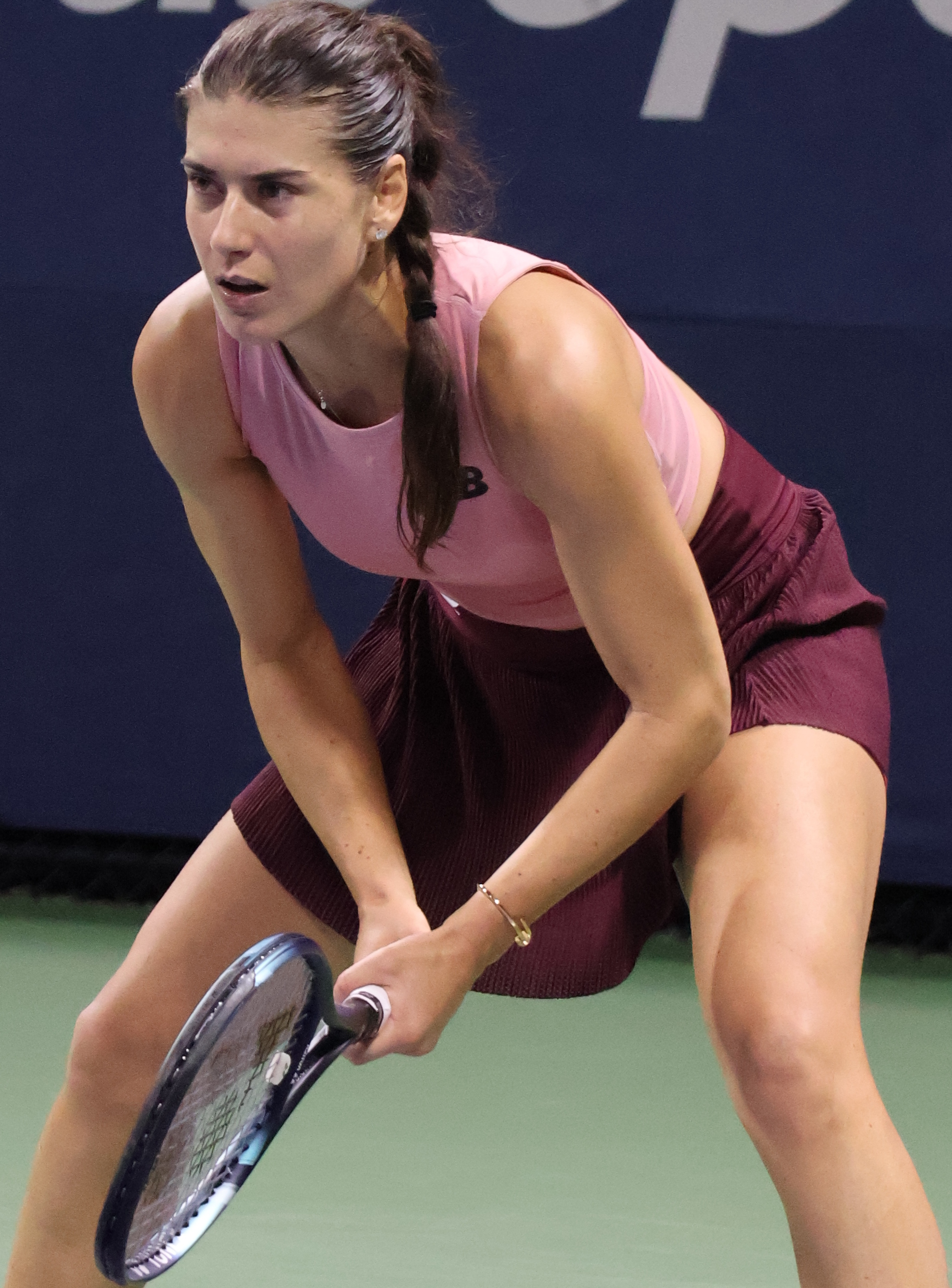
Cîrstea at the 2023 US Open

In Dubai, she defeated 11th seed Haddad Maia in the longest match of the season thus far lasting 3 hours and 29 minutes. Ranked No. 83 at the next WTA 1000 in Indian Wells, for a second consecutive year she reached the fourth round defeating Kimberly Birrell, 19th seed Madison Keys by walkover, and Bernarda Pera. Next she defeated fifth seed Caroline Garcia to reach her first quarterfinal at this level since 2017 and at this tournament and only her fifth overall. In the next WTA 1000 in Miami she defeated again fourth seed Caroline Garcia, her second top-5 win in two weeks, and Karolína Muchová to reach the fourth round and the first in Miami since 2013. Next, she defeated Markéta Vondroušová to reach back-to-back WTA 1000 quarterfinals. She reached the semifinals without dropping a set, only for a second time at the WTA 1000 level in a decade (after the 2013 Canadian Open final), defeating world No. 2, Aryna Sabalenka, for her biggest win in her career. She was the first player ranked outside the top 50 to win 9+ main-draw matches at the Sunshine Double in a single year: four in Indian Wells and five in Miami. As a result, she entered back into the top 50 a spot shy of the top 40. In May, Cîrstea defeated Elizabeth Mandlik in the final of the Catalonia Open to become the first ever champion in the inaugural edition of that WTA 125 tournament.

Seeded 30th at the US Open, Cîrstea reached the quarterfinal of a major for the second time, and 14 years after her first quarterfinal appearance at the 2009 French Open. Her run to the quarterfinals included wins over Kayla Day and Anna Kalinskaya before upsets over former major champion and No. 4 seed, Elena Rybakina, in the third round, and No. 15 seed Belinda Bencic in the round of 16. In her quarterfinal match, she fell to tenth seed and former French Open finalist Karolína Muchová in straight sets.

=== 2024–2025: Cleveland singles and Madrid doubles titles ===
At the 2024 Dubai Championships, Cîrstea reached the semifinals defeating Sofia Kenin, 13th seed Veronika Kudermetova, Donna Vekić and then seventh seed Markéta Vondroušová in a quarterfinal during which she saved six match points. She lost in the last four to eventual champion, Jasmine Paolini. A foot injury which required surgery meant she missed the second half of the 2024 season.

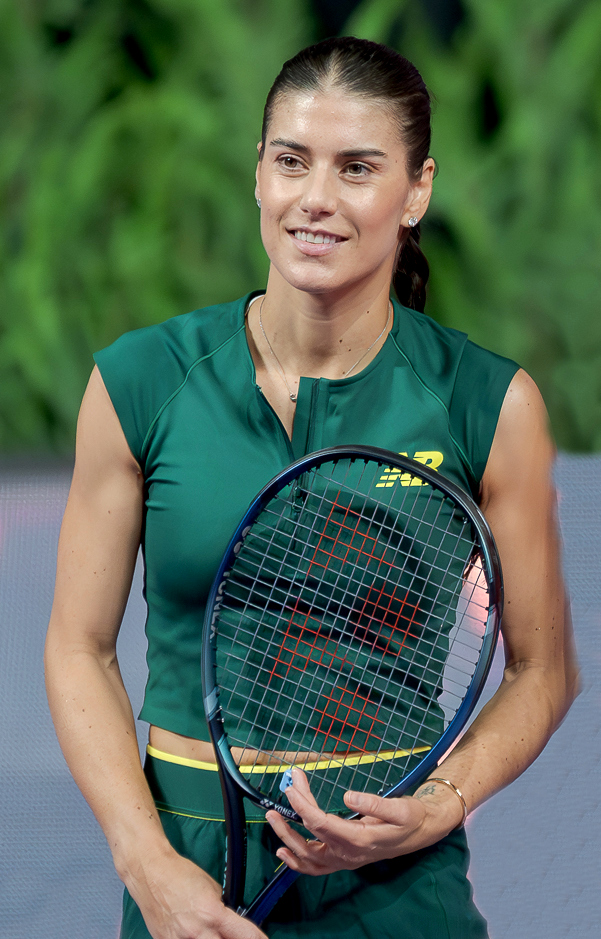
Sorana Cîrstea at the 2025 Transylvania Open

Given a wildcard entry, Cîrstea made it through to the quarterfinals at the 2025 Dubai Open, with wins over 10th seed Daria Kasatkina, qualifier Alycia Parks and eighth seed Emma Navarro, before losing to 14th seed Karolína Muchová. The following week, she reached the quarterfinals at the 2025 ATX Open, defeating Laura Siegemund and second seed Diana Shnaider. Her run was ended by fifth seed and eventual finalist McCartney Kessler.

Partnering with Kalinskaya, Cîrstea won her first WTA 1000 doubles title at the 2025 Madrid Open, defeating Kudermetova and Mertens in the final. She overcame Mihaela Buzărnescu, fifth seed Varvara Gracheva and María Lourdes Carlé to make it into the semifinals at the 2025 Iași Open, at which point she lost to sixth seed Jil Teichmann.

In August, at the Tennis in Cleveland, Cîrstea qualified for the main draw and defeated Moyuka Uchijima, Jil Teichmann, top seed Liudmila Samsonova and Anastasia Zakharova to reach the final, where she overcame Ann Li to win her third singles title and first in four years.

At the Japan Women's Open, wins over wildcard entrant Moyuka Uchijima, Katie Boulter and Viktorija Golubic saw Cîrstea make it through to the semifinals, at which point her run was ended by fourth seed and eventual champion, Leylah Fernandez. Seeded seventh at the Hong Kong Open, she defeated Dalma Gálfi and Ajla Tomljanović, before losing to second seed Leylah Fernandez for the second successive tournament, this time in the quarterfinals.

=== 2026: Farewell season, French Open QF, Wimbledon 3rd round, top 20 and career-high ===
In December 2025, Cîrstea confirmed that the 2026 WTA Tour would be her final season as a professional tennis player and that she planned to retire at the end of the year.

During the Australian Open, Cîrstea was involved in a tense post-match exchange with Naomi Osaka following her second-round defeat, when she expressed frustration over Osaka’s vocalisations between points. Cîrstea offered a notably frosty handshake at the net.

Entering the tournament seeded third, Cîrstea won the Transylvania Open, defeating top seed Emma Raducanu in the final. This was her fourth career singles title, and she won it without dropping a set.

In Dubai, Cîrstea reached the third round overcoming Aliaksandra Sasnovich and 10th seed Linda Nosková and thereby extending her winning match-streak to seven, before losing to Alexandra Eala.

She lost in the quarterfinals in Linz to top seed and eventual champion Mirra Andreeva. However, at the same tournament in doubles, she partnered with Zhang Shuai to win her seventh career doubles title, defeating Jesika Malečková and Miriam Škoch in the final.

At the Italian Open, she reached the quarterfinals for the first time at the event, becoming the oldest player ever to defeat a world No. 1 on clay courts, Aryna Sabalenka, and the oldest to do so from a set down on any surface and then defeated Linda Noskova, and Jelena Ostapenko to reach the semifinals, where she lost to third seed Coco Gauff. During her run to the last four, Cîrstea achieved a number of notable feats including becoming the third-oldest semifinalist in Rome in the Open Era (after Martina Navratilova and Billie Jean King), and also the third oldest in a WTA 1000 event behind Serena Williams (in 2019) and Venus Williams (in 2017, 2018). At 36 years and 32 days old, she became the oldest women’s player in the Open Era to record her first career win over a world No. 1. Following the tournament, Cîrstea also became the oldest women’s player to make their top 20 debut in WTA rankings history, at world No. 18.

At the French Open, Cîrstea reached her first quarterfinal at the event in 17 years, since 2009. With her third-round victory over Solana Sierra, she became the oldest woman in the Open Era to score a double bagel in a singles major main-draw match, overtaking Victoria Azarenka from the previous year. With her win over Wang Xiyu in the fourth round, Cîrstea set the longest gap between the first two quarterfinals at a women's singles major in the Open Era. In the last eight, her run was ended by eighth seed Mirra Andreeva.

At the Wimbledon Championships, Cîrstea opened her campaign with straight-set victories over Sára Bejlek and Kimberly Birrell to advance to the third round. She was then defeated by ninth seed and eventual champion Linda Nosková in a deciding-set tiebreak, ending her Wimbledon run in what was her farewell season on the WTA Tour.

She then lost in the Hong Kong Open against Alexandra Shubladze in the quarterfinals. This would be her final match on the tour.

== Playing style ==
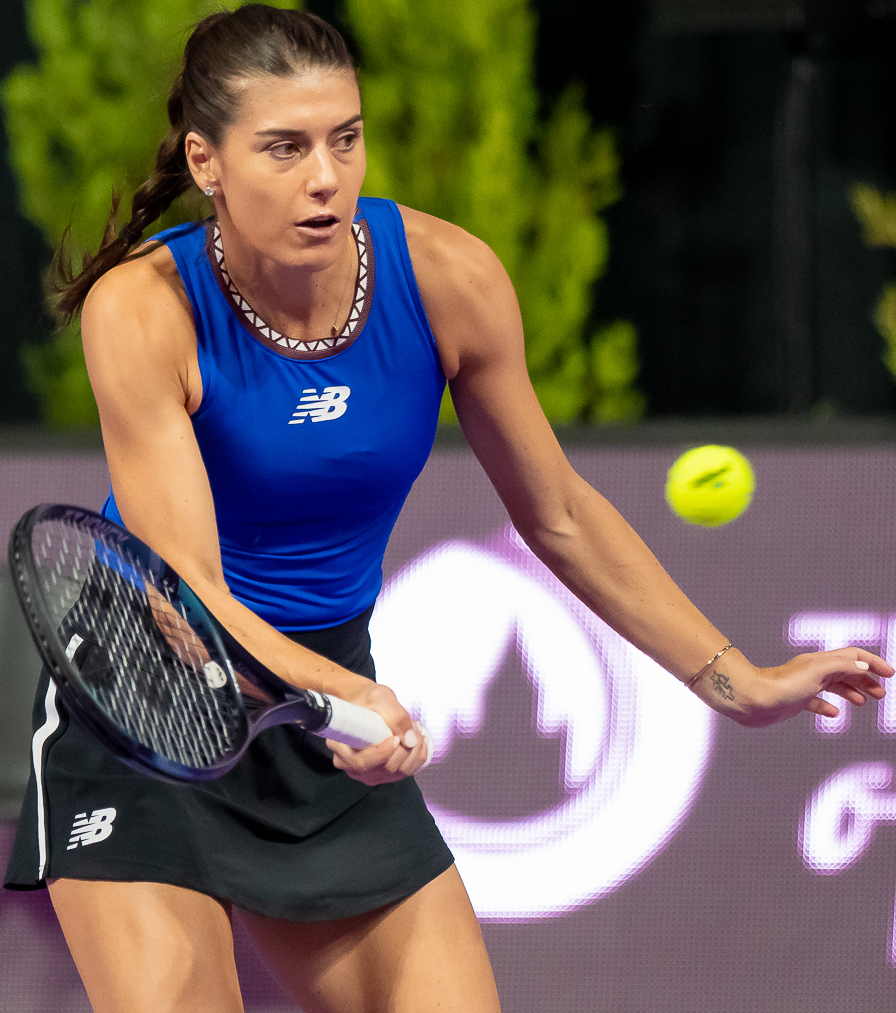
Cîrstea playing a volley

Cîrstea is an aggressive baseliner, whose game centers around her quick, flat, and powerful groundstrokes. As a result of her high-risk game style, she typically accumulates high numbers of both winners and unforced errors. Her backhand is her most reliable groundstroke, and she consistently hits winners with this shot, and, even when she does not aim specifically for the lines, her backhand penetrates deep into the court, allowing her to dictate play. Her forehand is hit very flat, allowing her to hit deep into the court with regularity, generate consistent power, and hit a large numbers of winners; her forehand is somewhat erratic, however, meaning that unforced errors do accumulate from this wing. Cîrstea is capable of generating sharp angles off both sides, producing winners. According to the Tennis Spy, her long stride means she covers ground while not appearing to move particularly quickly, allowing her to execute her game style excellently. As a doubles player, she is also a very solid volleyer, and likes to attack short balls with powerful swinging volleys. Her first serve is powerful, peaking at 109 mph (175 km/h), allowing her to serve aces and dictate play from the first stroke, however a tendency to take risks on her second serve does lead to an accumulation of double faults when nervous.

== Sponsorships ==
Between 2006 and 2016, Cîrstea was sponsored for clothing, apparel, and footwear by Adidas; since 2016, she has been sponsored by New Balance. Cîrstea has used numerous racquets throughout her professional career – until 2014, Cîrstea used Wilson racquets, specifically endorsing the Wilson Blade range of racquets. In 2015, Cîrstea used the Babolat Pure Strike racquet, before switching to the Pure Aero model between 2016 and 2019. Cîrstea later switched to the Yonex EZONE 100 racquet in 2019, and is still using this racquet currently.

== Career statistics ==
=== Grand Slam performance timelines ===
Key
W	F	SF	QF	#R	RR	Q#	P#	DNQ	A	Z#	PO	G	S	B	NMS	NTI	P	NH

(W) winner; (F) finalist; (SF) semifinalist; (QF) quarterfinalist; (#R) rounds 4, 3, 2, 1; (RR) round-robin stage; (Q#) qualification round; (P#) preliminary round; (DNQ) did not qualify; (A) absent; (Z#) Davis/Fed Cup Zonal Group (with number indication) or (PO) play-off; (G) gold, (S) silver or (B) bronze Olympic/Paralympic medal; (NMS) not a Masters tournament; (NTI) not a Tier I tournament; (P) postponed; (NH) not held; (SR) strike rate (events won / competed); (W–L) win–loss record.
To avoid confusion and double counting, these charts are updated at the conclusion of a tournament or when the player's participation has ended.

==== Singles ====
Tournament	2007	2008	2009	2010	2011	2012	2013	2014	2015	2016	2017	2018	2019	2020	2021	2022	2023	2024	2025	2026	SR	W–L
Australian Open	A	1R	1R	2R	2R	3R	3R	1R	1R	A	4R	2R	1R	2R	3R	4R	1R	1R	1R	2R	0 / 18	17–18
French Open	A	2R	QF	1R	3R	1R	3R	3R	Q3	1R	2R	1R	2R	1R	4R	2R	1R	1R	A	QF	0 / 17	21–17
Wimbledon	Q2	2R	3R	1R	1R	3R	2R	1R	Q2	1R	3R	2R	1R	NH	3R	2R	3R	1R	1R	3R	0 / 17	16–17
US Open	Q1	2R	3R	1R	1R	2R	2R	2R	Q3	1R	2R	2R	3R	3R	2R	2R	QF	A	2R	4R	0 / 17	22–17
Win–Loss	0–0	3–4	8–4	1–4	3–4	5–4	6–4	3–4	0–1	0–3	7–4	3–4	3–4	3–3	8–4	6–4	6–4	0–3	1–3	10–4	0 / 69	76–69

==== Doubles ====
Tournament	2008	2009	2010	2011	2012	2013	2014	…	2017	2018	2019	2020	2021	…	2024	2025	2026	SR	W–L
Australian Open	A	2R	1R	2R	1R	1R	1R		1R	3R	2R	A	A	A	1R	A	1R	0 / 11	5–11
French Open	3R	1R	1R	1R	1R	2R	1R		1R	3R	A	A	A	A	A	A	A	0 / 9	5–9
Wimbledon	2R	2R	A	3R	1R	1R	A		A	1R	2R	NH	A	A	A	QF	A	0 / 8	8–8
US Open	2R	3R	2R	2R	1R	1R	2R		3R	1R	A	A	A	A	A	1R	A	0 / 10	8–10
Win–Loss	4–3	4–4	1–3	4–4	0–4	1–4	1–3	0–0	2–3	4–4	2–2	0–0	0–0	0–0	0–1	3–2	0–1	0 / 38	26–38

=== WTA 1000 finals ===
==== Singles: 1 (runner-up) ====
Result	Year	Tournament	Surface	Opponent	Score
Loss	2013	Canadian Open	Hard	(United States) Serena Williams	2–6, 0–6

==== Doubles: 1 (title) ====
Result	Year	Tournament	Surface	Partner	Opponents	Score
Win	2025	Madrid Open	Clay	Anna Kalinskaya	Veronika Kudermetova (Belgium) Elise Mertens	6–7^{(10–12)}, 6–2, [12–10]
