= Audrey Bergot =

French tennis player

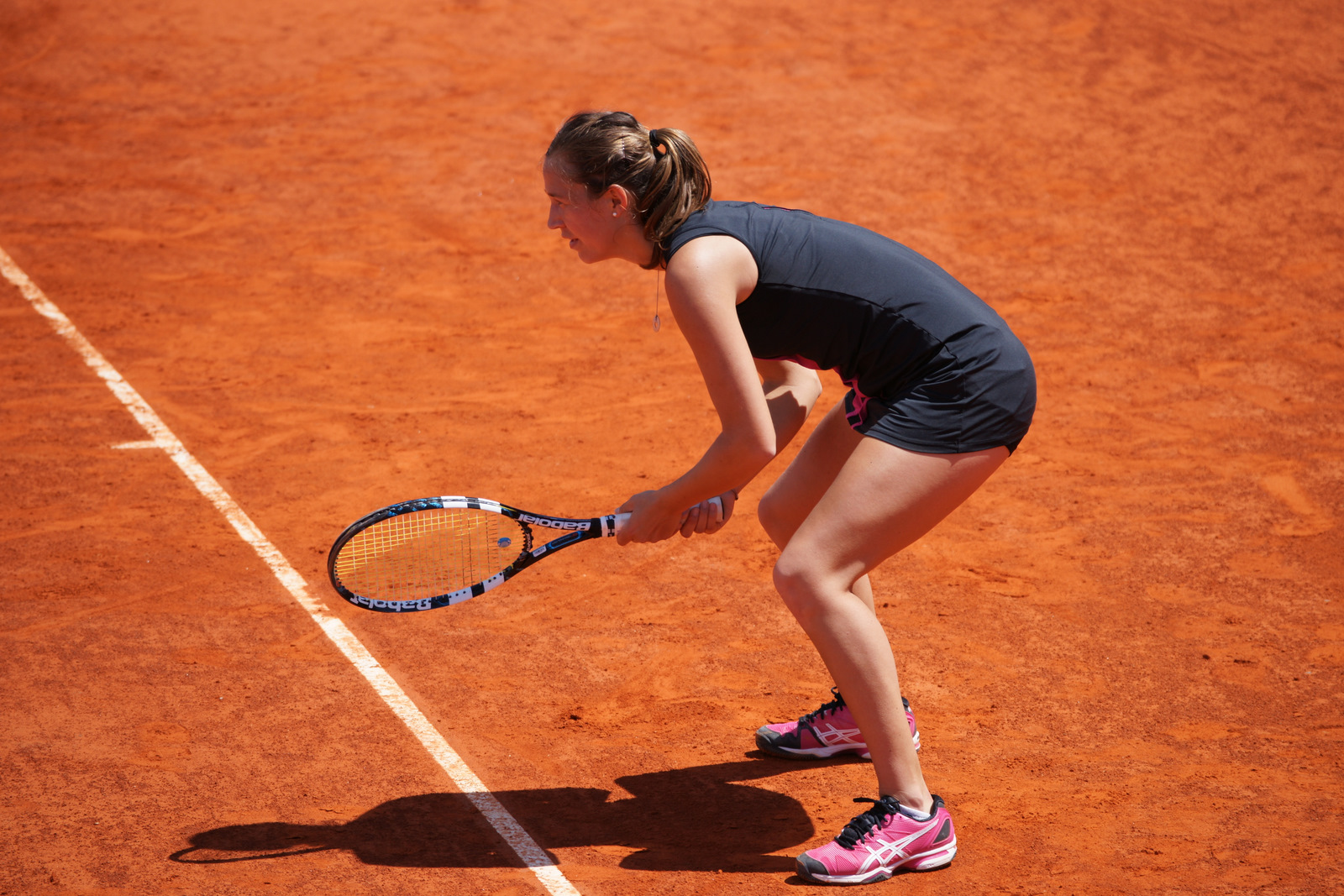
- Audrey Bergot at the 2012 Open de Cagnes-sur-Mer
- Country (sports): France
- Residence: Marcq-en-Barœul
- Born: 1 February 1985 (age 40) Lille
- Height: 1.75 m (5 ft 9 in)
- Turned pro: 2002
- Plays: Right (two-handed backhand)
- Prize money: $72,858

Singles
- Career record: 155–136
- Career titles: 1 ITF
- Highest ranking: No. 224 (21 March 2011)

Grand Slam singles results
- French Open: Q1 (2011)

Doubles
- Career record: 41–52
- Career titles: 2 ITF
- Highest ranking: No. 289 (2 May 2011)

Grand Slam doubles results
- French Open: 1R (2011)

Audrey Bergot (born 1 February 1985) is a former French tennis player.

Her highest WTA singles ranking is 224, which she reached on 21 March 2011. Her career-high in doubles is 289, achieved on 2 May 2011. Bergot won one singles title and two doubles titles on the ITF Women's Circuit in her career.

== ITF Circuit finals ==
$25,000 tournaments
$10,000 tournaments

=== Singles: 10 (1 title, 9 runner-ups) ===
Result	No.	Date	Tournament	Surface	Opponent	Score
Win	1.	24 September 2006	ITF Limoges, France	Hard (i)	(France) Constance Sibille	4–6, 6–4, 6–1
Loss	1.	25 March 2007	ITF Amiens, France	Clay (i)	(Brazil) Teliana Pereira	5–7, 6–3, 1–6
Loss	2.	23 September 2007	Open de Limoges, France	Hard (i)	(France) Anne-Laure Heitz	1–6, 1–6
Loss	3.	22 March 2009	ITF Amiens, France	Clay (i)	(France) Violette Huck	3–6, 4–6
Loss	4.	18 October 2009	ITF Clermont-Ferrand, France	Hard (i)	(Poland) Patrycja Sanduska	6–7^{(3)}, 1–6
Loss	5.	31 January 2010	ITF Kaarst, Germany	Carpet (i)	(Germany) Annika Beck	2–6, 5–7
Loss	6.	18 April 2010	ITF Cairo, Egypt	Clay	(Czech Republic) Renata Voráčová	3–6, 4–6
Loss	7.	20 June 2010	ITF Padua, Italy	Clay	(Romania) Liana Ungur	4–6, 4–6
Loss	8.	25 June 2011	ITF Périgueux, France	Clay	(France) Séverine Beltrame	4–6, 2–6
Loss	9.	25 March 2012	ITF Gonesse, France	Clay	(France) Iryna Brémond	6–7^{(2)}, 3–6

=== Doubles: 3 (2 titles, 1 runner-up) ===
Result	No.	Date	Tournament	Surface	Partner	Opponents	Score
Win	1.	4 October 2009	ITF Clermont-Ferrand, France	Hard (i)	(France) Andrea Ka	(Switzerland) Lucia Kovarčíková (Belgium) Davinia Lobbinger	6–2, 6–2
Win	2.	28 March 2010	ITF Gonesse, France	Clay (i)	(France) Iryna Brémond	(Brazil) Fernanda Faria (Brazil) Paula Cristina Gonçalves	6–3, 6–3
Loss	1.	11 April 2010	ITF Ain Sukhna, Egypt	Clay	(South Africa) Chanel Simmonds	(Sweden) Anna Brazhnikova (Russia) Marta Sirotkina	3–6, 3–6
